= 2022–23 Juventus FC season =

Italian football club season

Juventus
2022–23 season
- President: Andrea Agnelli (Note: Until 18 January 2023.); Gianluca Ferrero (Note: From 18 January 2023.)
- Head coach: Massimiliano Allegri
- Stadium: Juventus Stadium
- Serie A: 7th
- Coppa Italia: Semi-finals
- UEFA Champions League: Group stage
- UEFA Europa League: Semi-finals
- Top goalscorer: League: Dušan Vlahović (10); All: Dušan Vlahović (14)
- Highest home attendance: 41,089 vs Paris Saint-Germain (2 November 2022, Champions League)
- Lowest home attendance: 21,581 vs Lazio (2 February 2023, Coppa Italia)
- Average home league attendance: 37,672
- Biggest win: Juventus 4–0 Empoli
- Biggest defeat: Napoli 5–1 Juventus
Home colours	Away colours	Third colours

The 2022–23 season was Juventus Football Club's 125th season in existence and their 16th consecutive season in the top flight of Italian football. In addition to the domestic league, Juventus participated in this season's editions of the Coppa Italia, UEFA Champions League and UEFA Europa League.

On 20 January 2023, Juventus were deducted 15 points as punishment for capital gain violations. The decision, subjected to appeal, was reversed on 20 April 2023. On 22 May 2023, Juventus were deducted 10 points as punishment for capital gain violations.

== Players ==
=== Squad information ===
Players, appearances, goals and squad numbers last updated on 31 January 2023. Appearances and goals include league matches only.
Note: Flags indicate national team as has been defined under FIFA eligibility rules. Players may hold more than one non-FIFA nationality.

No.	Player	Nat.	Position(s)	Date of birth (age)	Signed in	Contract ends	Signed from	Transfer fee	Apps.	Goals
Goalkeepers
1	Wojciech Szczęsny	(Poland)	GK	18 April 1990 (aged 33)	2017	2024	(England) Arsenal	€12M	137	0
23	Carlo Pinsoglio	(Italy)	GK	16 March 1990 (aged 33)	2014	2025	(Italy) Vicenza	€0.7M	5	0
36	Mattia Perin	(Italy)	GK	10 November 1992 (aged 30)	2018	2025	(Italy) Genoa	€12M	14	0
Defenders
2	Mattia De Sciglio	(Italy)	RB / RWB / LB / LWB	20 October 1992 (aged 30)	2017	2025	(Italy) Milan	€12M	64	2
3	Bremer	(Brazil)	CB	18 March 1997 (aged 26)	2022	2027	(Italy) Torino	€41M	0	0
6	Danilo	(Brazil)	CB / RB / LB	15 July 1991 (aged 31)	2019	2025	(England) Manchester City	€37M	78	4
12	Alex Sandro	(Brazil)	LB / LWB	26 January 1991 (aged 32)	2015	2023	(Portugal) Porto	€26M	189	13
15	Federico Gatti	(Italy)	CB	24 June 1998 (aged 25)	2022	2026	(Italy) Frosinone	€5.4M	0	0
19	Leonardo Bonucci (c)	(Italy)	CB	1 May 1987 (aged 36)	2018	2024	(Italy) Milan	€35M	341	26
24	Daniele Rugani	(Italy)	CB	29 July 1994 (aged 28)	2015	2023	(Italy) Empoli	€3.5M	91	6
42	Tommaso Barbieri	(Italy)	LB / LWB	26 August 2002 (aged 20)	2020	2026	(Italy) Novara	€1.6M	0	0
Midfielders
5	Manuel Locatelli	(Italy)	CM	8 January 1998 (aged 25)	2021	2023	(Italy) Sassuolo (loan)	Free	31	3
10	Paul Pogba	(France)	CM	15 March 1993 (aged 30)	2022	2026	(England) Manchester United	Free	124	28
11	Juan Cuadrado	(Colombia)	RB / RWB / RW	26 May 1988 (aged 35)	2016	2023	(England) Chelsea	€25M	193	18
17	Filip Kostić	(Serbia)	LWB / LW	1 November 1992 (aged 30)	2022	2026	(Germany) Eintracht Frankfurt	€12M	0	0
20	Fabio Miretti	(Italy)	CM	3 August 2003 (aged 19)	2021	2026	(Italy) Youth Sector	N/A	6	0
25	Adrien Rabiot	(France)	CM	3 April 1995 (aged 28)	2019	2023	(France) Paris Saint-Germain	120M	94	5
32	Leandro Paredes	(Argentina)	CM	29 June 1994 (aged 29)	2022	2023	(France) Paris Saint-Germain (loan)	Free	0	0
44	Nicolò Fagioli	(Italy)	CM / AM	12 February 2001 (aged 22)	2020	2026	(Italy) Youth Sector	N/A	1	0
45	Enzo Barrenechea	(Argentina)	CM	11 May 2001 (aged 22)	2020	2026	(Italy) Youth Sector	N/A	0	0
Forwards
7	Federico Chiesa	(Italy)	AM / RW / LW	25 October 1997 (aged 25)	2020	2025	(Italy) Fiorentina	€40M	44	10
9	Dušan Vlahović	(Serbia)	ST	28 January 2000 (aged 23)	2022	2026	(Italy) Fiorentina	€70M	15	7
14	Arkadiusz Milik	(Poland)	ST	28 February 1994 (aged 29)	2022	2023	(France) Marseille (loan)	€7M	0	0
18	Moise Kean	(Italy)	ST	28 February 2000 (aged 23)	2021	2023	(England) Everton (loan)	€7M	48	12
21	Kaio Jorge	(Brazil)	ST	24 January 2002 (aged 21)	2021	2026	(Brazil) Santos	€1.5M	9	0
22	Ángel Di María	(Argentina)	AM / RW	14 February 1988 (aged 35)	2022	2023	(France) Paris Saint-Germain	Free	0	0
30	Matías Soulé	(Argentina)	RW / LW / AM	15 April 2003 (aged 20)	2021	2024	(Italy) Youth Sector	N/A	2	0
43	Samuel Iling-Junior	(England)	RW / LW / AM	4 October 2003 (aged 19)	2022	2025	(Italy) Youth Sector	N/A	0	0
Players transferred during the season
8	Weston McKennie	(United States)	CM	28 August 1998 (aged 24)	2020	2025	(Germany) Schalke 04	€22M	55	8
13	Nicolò Rovella	(Italy)	CM	4 December 2001 (aged 21)	2022	2024	(Italy) Genoa	€23.3M	3	0
28	Denis Zakaria	(Switzerland)	CM	20 November 1996 (aged 26)	2022	2026	(Germany) Borussia Mönchengladbach	€4.5M	9	1
33	Marley Aké	(France)	RW / AM	5 January 2001 (aged 22)	2021	2025	(France) Marseille	€8M	4	0

== Transfers ==
=== Summer 2022 ===
==== In ====
Date	Pos.	Player	Age	Moving from	Fee	Notes	Source
1 July 2022	DF	(Italy) Federico Gatti	24	(Italy) Frosinone	N/A	Return from loan	
1 July 2022	MF	(Italy) Nicolò Fagioli	21	(Italy) Cremonese	N/A	Return from loan	
1 July 2022	MF	(Italy) Nicolò Rovella	20	(Italy) Genoa	N/A	Return from loan	
8 July 2022	FW	(Argentina) Ángel Di María	34	(France) Paris Saint-Germain	Free	Free agent	
11 July 2022	MF	(France) Paul Pogba	29	(England) Manchester United	Free	Free agent	
20 July 2022	DF	(Brazil) Bremer	25	(Italy) Torino	€41M	€8M variables	
12 August 2022	MF	(Serbia) Filip Kostić	29	(Germany) Eintracht Frankfurt	€13M	€4.5M variables	
26 August 2022	FW	(Poland) Arkadiusz Milik	28	(France) Marseille	€0.9M	On loan until June 2023 with option to buy for €7M + €2.8M variables	
31 August 2022	MF	(Argentina) Leandro Paredes	28	(France) Paris Saint-Germain	N/A	On loan until June 2023 with option to buy for €22.6M + €3M variables or €2.5M without redeem	

==== Out ====
Date	Pos.	Player	Age	Moving to	Fee	Notes	Source
13 June 2022	DF	(Italy) Giorgio Chiellini	37	(United States) Los Angeles FC	Free	Released	
1 July 2022	FW	(Spain) Álvaro Morata	29	(Spain) Atlético Madrid	Free	End of loan	
10 July 2022	DF	(Belgium) Koni De Winter	20	(Italy) Empoli	N/A	On loan until June 2023	
15 July 2022	MF	(Italy) Federico Bernardeschi	28	(Canada) Toronto FC	Free	Released	
19 July 2022	DF	(Netherlands) Matthijs de Ligt	22	(Germany) Bayern Munich	€67M	€10M variables	
20 July 2022	FW	(Argentina) Paulo Dybala	28	(Italy) Roma	Free	Released	
1 August 2022	MF	(Wales) Aaron Ramsey	31	(France) Nice	Free	Released	
15 August 2022	DF	(Italy) Luca Pellegrini	23	(Germany) Eintracht Frankfurt	N/A	On loan until June 2023	
31 August 2022	MF	(Italy) Nicolò Rovella	20	(Italy) Monza	Free	On loan until June 2023	
1 September 2022	MF	(Brazil) Arthur	26	(England) Liverpool	€4.5M	On loan until June 2023 with option to buy for €37.5M	
2 September 2022	MF	(Switzerland) Denis Zakaria	25	(England) Chelsea	€3M	On loan until June 2023 with €1M variables and option to buy for €28M + €5M variables	

==== Other acquisitions ====
Date	Pos.	Player	Age	Moving from	Fee	Notes	Source
1 July 2022	MF	(Belgium) Daouda Peeters	23	(Belgium) Standard Liège	N/A	End of loan to play for Juventus Next Gen	
1 July 2022	FW	(Italy) Federico Chiesa	24	(Italy) Fiorentina	€42.5M	From loan to definitive purchase €7.4M variables	
1 July 2022	FW	(Portugal) Félix Correia	21	(Italy) Parma	N/A	End of loan to play for Juventus Next Gen	
12 July 2022	MF	(Turkey) Kenan Yıldız	17	(Germany) Bayern Munich	Free	To play for Juventus U19	
12 July 2022	FW	(Croatia) Ivano Srdoc	17	(Croatia) Rijeka	€1M	To play for Juventus U19	
14 July 2022	DF	(Italy) Andrea Cambiaso	22	(Italy) Genoa	€8.8M	€1.5M variables	
9 August 2022	MF	(Italy) Clemente Perotti	19	(Italy) Chisola	Undisclosed		
25 August 2022	MF	(Italy) Michele Besaggio	19	(Italy) Genoa	N/A	On loan with option to buy. To play for Juventus Next Gen	
26 August 2022	FW	(Italy) Tommaso Mancini	18	(Italy) Vicenza	€2M	To play for Juventus U19	
1 September 2022	MF	(Norway) Martin Palumbo	20	(Italy) Udinese	N/A	Renowal of loan to play for Juventus Next Gen with option to buy	

==== Other disposals ====
Date	Pos.	Player	Age	Moving to	Fee	Notes	Source
11 May 2022	FW	(Italy) Manuel Pisano	16	(Germany) Bayern Munich	Free	Released	
17 June 2022	DF	(Turkey) Merih Demiral	24	(Italy) Atalanta	€20M	Redeem after loan €2.5M variables	
18 June 2022	DF	(Austria) Ervin Omić	19	(Austria) Wolfsberger AC	Free	Expiration contract	
20 June 2022	DF	(Italy) Pietro Beruatto	23	(Italy) Pisa	€2.1M	Option to buy	
23 June 2022	DF	(Italy) Riccardo Capellini	22	(Italy) Benevento	Undisclosed		
30 June 2022	DF	(Italy) Alessandro Di Pardo	22	(Italy) Cagliari	N/A	On loan until June 2023 with option to buy	
1 July 2022	DF	(Italy) Filippo Delli Carri	23	(Italy) Como	Free	Released	
1 July 2022	FW	(Benin) Angel Chibozo	19	(France) Amiens	N/A	On loan until June 2023 with obligation to buy for €1M	
4 July 2022	MF	(Italy) Rolando Mandragora	25	(Italy) Fiorentina	€8.2M	€1M variables	
4 July 2022	FW	(Italy) Luca Zanimacchia	23	(Italy) Cremonese	€3M	Redeem after loan	
5 July 2022	GK	(Uruguay) Franco Israel	22	(Portugal) Sporting CP	€0.65M	Variables for future sale	
5 July 2022	MF	(Switzerland) Kristian Šekularac	18	(England) Fulham	Free	Released	
5 July 2022	FW	(Albania) Giacomo Vrioni	23	(United States) New England Revolution	€3.66M		
6 July 2022	FW	(Switzerland) Christopher Lungoyi	22	(Italy) Ascoli	N/A	On loan until June 2023	
7 July 2022	GK	(Italy) Mattia Del Favero	24	(Italy) Pro Patria	N/A	On loan until June 2023	
8 July 2022	DF	(Switzerland) Albian Hajdari	19	(Switzerland) Lugano	N/A	On loan until June 2023 with option to buy	
12 July 2022	MF	(Italy) Luca Clemenza	25	(Italy) Pescara	€0.175M	Redeem after loan	
12 July 2022	MF	(Italy) Hans Nicolussi	22	(Italy) Südtirol	N/A	On loan until June 2023	
13 July 2022	GK	(Italy) Stefano Gori	26	(Italy) Perugia	N/A	On loan until June 2023	
14 July 2022	GK	(Italy) Alessandro Siano	21	(Italy) Pontedera	Free	Released	
14 July 2022	DF	(Italy) Davide De Marino	22	(Italy) Pescara	N/A	On loan until June 2023 with option to buy	
14 July 2022	DF	(Romania) Radu Drăgușin	20	(Italy) Genoa	N/A	On loan until June 2023 with option to buy for €5.5M + 1.8M variables	
15 July 2022	DF	(Italy) Andrea Cambiaso	22	(Italy) Bologna	€1.97M	On loan until June 2023	
15 July 2022	DF	(Italy) Federico Savio	17	(Italy) Sampdoria	N/A	On loan until June 2023	
15 July 2022	MF	(Switzerland) Joël Ribeiro	19	(Switzerland) Lugano	Undisclosed		
17 July 2022	FW	(Italy) Matteo Brunori	27	(Italy) Palermo	€1.8M	€1.5M variables	
19 July 2022	DF	(Switzerland) Nikita Vlasenko	21	(Croatia) Rijeka	€1M		
19 July 2022	MF	(Italy) Simone Giacchino	19	(Italy) Piacenza	Free	Released	
20 July 2022	DF	(Italy) Matteo Anzolin	21	(Austria) Wolfsberger AC	Undisclosed		
21 July 2022	MF	(Italy) Giuseppe Leone	21	(Italy) Siena	Free	Released	
21 July 2022	MF	(Italy) Filippo Ranocchia	21	(Italy) Monza	N/A	On loan until June 2023 with option to buy	
1 August 2022	FW	(Spain) Alejandro Marqués	21	(Portugal) Estoril	N/A	On loan until June 2023	
2 August 2022	MF	(Cyprus) Grigoris Kastanos	24	(Italy) Salernitana	€0.3M	Redeem after loan	
9 August 2022	DF	(Brazil) David Wesley	22	(Brazil) Cruzeiro	€0.35M		
9 August 2022	MF	(Italy) Clemente Perotti	19	(Italy) Pro Patria	N/A	On loan until June 2023	
11 August 2022	DF	(Romania) Gabriele Boloca	21	(Italy) Seregno	Free	Released	
13 August 2022	DF	(Switzerland) Daniel Leo	22	(Italy) Foggia	N/A	On loan until June 2023	
18 August 2022	DF	(Italy) Luca Coccolo	24	(Italy) Cesena	Free	Released	
19 August 2022	DF	(Italy) Paolo Gozzi	21	(Italy) Genoa	Undisclosed	To play on loan to Cosenza	
24 August 2022	DF	(Italy) Erasmo Mulè	21	(Italy) Catanzaro	N/A	On loan until June 2023	
26 August 2022	FW	(Italy) Andrea Brighenti	34	(Italy) Trento	Free	Released	
1 September 2022	DF	(Italy) Filippo Fiumanò	19	(Italy) Montevarchi	N/A	On loan until June 2023	
1 September 2022	DF	(Italy) Gianluca Frabotta	23	(Italy) Frosinone	N/A	On loan until June 2023 with option to buy	
1 September 2022	DF	(Italy) Alessandro Minelli	23	(Italy) Virtus Francavilla	N/A	On loan until June 2023	
1 September 2022	MF	(Italy) Ferdinando Del Sole	24	(Italy) Potenza	N/A	On loan until June 2024	
1 September 2022	FW	(Croatia) Marko Pjaca	27	(Italy) Empoli	N/A	On loan until June 2023 with option to buy	

=== Winter 2022–23 ===
==== Out ====
Date	Pos.	Player	Age	Moving to	Fee	Notes	Source
30 January 2023	MF	(United States) Weston McKennie	24	(England) Leeds United	€1.25M	On loan until June 2023 and option to buy for €33M + €7M variables	
31 January 2023	FW	(France) Marley Aké	22	(France) Dijon	N/A	On loan until June 2023	

==== Other acquisitions ====
Date	Pos.	Player	Age	Moving from	Fee	Notes	Source
3 January 2023	FW	(Netherlands) Mohamed Ihattaren	20	(Netherlands) Ajax	N/A	End of loan	
23 January 2023	GK	(Italy) Gian Marco Crespi	21	(Italy) Crotone	N/A	On loan until June 2023 to play for Juventus Next Gen with option to buy	
31 January 2023	FW	(Italy) Gianmarco Di Biase	17	(Italy) Pistoiese	€0.35M	On loan to Pistoiese until June 2023	

==== Other disposals ====
Date	Pos.	Player	Age	Moving to	Fee	Notes	Source
3 January 2023	GK	(Hungary) Zsombor Senkó	19	(Hungary) Diósgyőri VTK	Undisclosed		
3 January 2023	DF	(Italy) Erasmo Mulè	23	(Italy) Monopoli	N/A	On loan until June 2023, after the interruption of loan with Catanzaro	
5 January 2023	MF	(Italy) Hans Nicolussi Caviglia	22	(Italy) Salernitana	N/A	On loan until June 2023 with option to buy for €8M, after the interruption of loan with Südtirol	
11 January 2023	DF	(Italy) Davide De Marino	22	(Italy) Virtus Francavilla	N/A	On loan until June 2023, after the interruption of loan with Pescara	
23 January 2023	DF	(Italy) Giuseppe Verduci	21	(Italy) Siena	Free	Released	
27 January 2023	MF	(Tunisia) Hamza Rafia	23	(Italy) Pescara	Free	Variables for future sale	
31 January 2023	DF	(Italy) Luca Pellegrini	23	(Italy) Lazio	N/A	On loan until June 2023 with option to buy for €15M, after the interruption of loan with Eintracht Frankfurt	
31 January 2023	MF	(Italy) Emanuele Zuelli	21	(Italy) Pisa	Undisclosed		
31 January 2023	FW	(Portugal) Félix Correia	22	(Portugal) Marítimo	N/A	On loan until June 2023	

== Pre-season and friendlies ==
17 July 2022 Friendly	Juventus	9–0	Pinerolo	Vinovo, Turin
10:30 CEST (UTC+2)	Di María; Zakaria; Kean; Soulé; Rabiot	Report		Stadium: Juventus Training Center

22 July 2022 Soccer Champions Tour	Juventus	2–0	Guadalajara	Paradise, United States
19:00 PDT (UTC−7)	Da Graca 10'; Cudrig (yellow card) 57'; Compagnon 80'	Report		Stadium: Allegiant Stadium; Attendance: 31,261; Referee: Daneon Parchment (Jamaica)

26 July 2022 Soccer Champions Tour	Barcelona	2–2	Juventus	Dallas, United States
19:30 CT (UTC−5)	Dembélé 34', 40'; Collado (yellow card) 78'	Report	Kean 39', 51'; Di María (yellow card) 74'; Barbieri (yellow card) 85'	Stadium: Cotton Bowl; Attendance: 58,127; Referee: Elton Garcia (United States)

30 July 2022 Soccer Champions Tour	Real Madrid	2–0	Juventus	Pasadena, United States
19:00 PDT (UTC−7)	Benzema 19' (pen.); Asensio 68', (yellow card) 81'	Report		Stadium: Rose Bowl; Attendance: 93,702; Referee: Michael Radchuk (United States)

4 August 2022 Friendly	Juventus	2–0	Juventus U23	Villar Perosa, Turin
17:00 CEST (UTC+2)	Locatelli 2'; Bonucci 16'	Report		Stadium: Stadio di Villar Perosa; Attendance: 3,000; Referee: Lorenzo Maggioni (Italy)
Note: The match was called off at the 49th minute due to the annual tradition of pitch invasion.

7 August 2022 Friendly	Juventus	0–4	Atlético Madrid	Vinovo, Turin (Note: The match was originally scheduled to be held in Tel Aviv, but was moved to Turin and played behind closed doors due to security concerns.)
18:00 CEST (UTC+2)		Report	Morata 10', 43', 52'; Félix (penalty missed) 40'; Cunha 90+1'	Stadium: Juventus Training Center; Attendance: 0 Referee: Paride Tremoleda (Italy)

17 December 2022 Friendly	Arsenal	0–2	Juventus	London, England
18:00 GMT (UTC+1)		Report	Xhaka 45+1' (o.g.); Holding 90+1' (o.g.)	Stadium: Emirates Stadium; Attendance: 25,000; Referee: David Coote (England)

22 December 2022 Friendly	Juventus	1–0	Rijeka	Turin, Italy
14:00 CET (UTC+1)	Kean 73'	Report	Vukčević (yellow card) 8'	Stadium: Juventus Stadium; Attendance: 0 (Note: The match was played behind closed doors.); Referee: Davide Ghersini (Italy)

30 December 2022 Friendly	Juventus	1–1	Standard Liège	Turin, Italy
14:30 CET (UTC+1)	Soulé 56' (pen.)	Report	Danilo 32' (o.g.)	Stadium: Juventus Stadium; Attendance: 9,096; Referee: Maria Sole Ferrieri Caputi (Italy)

== Competitions ==
=== Overview ===
Competition	First match	Last match	Starting round	Final position	Record							
Competition	First match	Last match	Starting round	Final position	Pld	W	D	L	GF	GA	GD	Win %
Serie A	15 August 2022	4 June 2023	Matchday 1	7th	38	22	6	10	56	33	+23	57.89
Coppa Italia	19 January 2023	26 April 2023	Round of 16	Semi-finals	4	2	1	1	4	3	+1	50.00
Champions League	6 September 2022	2 November 2022	Group stage	Group stage	6	1	0	5	9	13	−4	16.67
Europa League	16 February 2023	18 May 2023	Knockout round play-offs	Semi-finals	8	4	3	1	11	5	+6	50.00
Total					56	29	10	17	80	54	+26	51.79

Source: Soccerway

=== Serie A ===
==== League table ====
Pos	Team	Pld	W	D	L	GF	GA	GD	Pts	Qualification or relegation
5	Atalanta	38	19	7	12	66	48	+18	64	Qualification for the Europa League group stage (Note: Since the winners of the 2022–23 Coppa Italia, Inter Milan, qualified for the Champions League, the Europa League berth awarded to the Coppa Italia winners was passed to the sixth-placed team, and the Europa Conference League berth awarded to the sixth-placed team was passed to the seventh-placed team.)
6	Roma	38	18	9	11	50	38	+12	63	Qualification for the Europa League group stage
7	Juventus (Note: Juventus were excluded from UEFA competitions due to violation of UEFA's financial regulations.)	38	22	6	10	56	33	+23	62 (Note: Juventus were deducted 10 points as punishment for capital gain violations.)	
8	Fiorentina	38	15	11	12	53	43	+10	56	Qualification for the Εuropa Conference League play-off round
9	Bologna	38	14	12	12	53	49	+4	54	

Source: Serie A
Rules for classification: 1) Points; 2) Tiebreaker for Champions team and third relegated team; 3) Head-to-head points; 4) Head-to-head goal difference; 5) Goal difference; 6) Goals scored; 7) Draw. (Note: Head-to-head record is used only after all the matches between the teams in question have been played)

==== Results summary ====
Overall								Home						Away					
Pld	W	D	L	GF	GA	GD	Pts	W	D	L	GF	GA	GD	W	D	L	GF	GA	GD
38	22	6	10	56	33	+23	62	13	3	3	38	15	+23	9	3	7	18	18	0

Source: Serie A

==== Results by round ====
Round	1	2	3	4	5	6	7	8	9	10	11	12	13	14	15	16	17	18	19	20	21	22	23	24	25	26	27	28	29	30	31	32	33	34	35	36	37	38
Ground	H	A	H	H	A	H	A	H	A	A	H	A	H	A	H	A	H	A	H	H	A	H	A	H	A	H	A	H	A	A	H	A	H	A	H	A	H	A
Result	W	D	D	W	D	D	L	W	L	W	W	W	W	W	W	W	W	L	D	L	W	W	W	W	L	W	W	W	L	L	L	D	W	W	W	L	L	W
Position	2	4	8	5	7	8	8	7	8	8	8	7	5	4	3	3	2	3	10^{1}	13	10	9	7	7	7	7	7	7	7	7	3^{2}	3	3	2	2	7^{3}	7	7

Source: Serie A
A = Away; H = Home; W = Win; D = Draw; L = Loss
Notes:
- ^{1} Following matchday 18, Juventus were deducted 15 points as punishment for capital gain violations.
- ^{2} Following matchday 30, Juventus gained the deducted 15 points as punishment for capital gain violations.
- ^{3} Following matchday 35, Juventus were deducted 10 points as punishment for capital gain violations. The decision is subject to appeal.

==== Matches ====
The league fixtures were announced on 24 June 2022.

15 August 2022 1	Juventus	3–0	Sassuolo	Turin
20:45 CEST (UTC+2)	Locatelli (yellow card) 16'; Di María 26'; Vlahović 43' (pen.), 51'	Report	Thorstvedt (yellow card) 33'; Ferrari (yellow card) 41'; Matheus Henrique (yellow card) 69'	Stadium: Juventus Stadium; Attendance: 38,725; Referee: Antonio Rapuano

22 August 2022 2	Sampdoria	0–0	Juventus	Genoa
20:45 CEST (UTC+2)	Đuričić (yellow card) 42'; Léris (yellow card) 62'; Verre (yellow card) 87'	Report	Alex Sandro (yellow card) 45'; Rovella (yellow card) 90+1'	Stadium: Stadio Luigi Ferraris; Attendance: 27,573; Referee: Rosario Abisso

27 August 2022 3	Juventus	1–1	Roma	Turin
18:30 CEST (UTC+2)	Vlahović 2'; Locatelli (yellow card) 6'; Kostić (yellow card) 77'	Report	Cristante (yellow card) 41'; Abraham 69'; Çelik (yellow card) 90+5'	Stadium: Juventus Stadium; Attendance: 41,003; Referee: Massimiliano Irrati

31 August 2022 4	Juventus	2–0	Spezia	Turin
20:45 CEST (UTC+2)	Vlahović 9'; Milik 90+2'	Report	Bastoni (yellow card) 11'; Holm (yellow card) 73'	Stadium: Juventus Stadium; Attendance: 35,709; Referee: Andrea Colombo

3 September 2022 5	Fiorentina	1–1	Juventus	Florence
15:00 CEST (UTC+2)	Amrabat (yellow card) 15'; Kouamé 29'; Jović (penalty missed) 44'	Report	Milik 9'; Alex Sandro (yellow card) 33'; Locatelli (yellow card) 52'; Danilo (yellow card) 53'	Stadium: Stadio Artemio Franchi; Attendance: 36,550; Referee: Daniele Doveri

11 September 2022 6	Juventus	2–2	Salernitana	Turin
20:45 CEST (UTC+2)	Paredes (yellow card) 27'; Kean (yellow card) 32'; Bremer (yellow card) 45+4', (goal) 51'; Milik (yellow card) 83' (yellow-red card) 90+6'; Bonucci (penalty missed) 90+3, 90+3'; Cuadrado (red card) 90+9'	Report	Candreva 18'; Maggiore (yellow card) 38'; Piątek 45+5' (pen.), (yellow card) 55'; Fazio (yellow card) 53', (red card) 90+8'; Sepe (yellow card) 72'	Stadium: Juventus Stadium; Attendance: 35,097; Referee: Matteo Marcenaro

18 September 2022 7	Monza	1–0	Juventus	Monza
15:00 CEST (UTC+2)	Gytkjær 74'; Ciurria (yellow card) 89'; Rovella (yellow card) 90+1'	Report	Bremer (yellow card) 22'	Stadium: Stadio Brianteo; Attendance: 12,878; Referee: Fabio Maresca

2 October 2022 8	Juventus	3–0	Bologna	Turin
20:45 CEST (UTC+2)	Kostić 24'; Vlahović 59'; Milik 62'	Report	Sosa (yellow card) 90+2'	Stadium: Juventus Stadium; Attendance: 34,662; Referee: Rosario Abisso

8 October 2022 9	Milan	2–0	Juventus	Milan
18:00 CEST (UTC+2)	Tomori 45+1'; Brahim 54', (yellow card) 55'; Tonali (yellow card) 90+4'	Report	Cuadrado (yellow card) 26'; Paredes (yellow card) 90+4'; Kean (yellow card) 90+4'	Stadium: San Siro; Attendance: 75,530; Referee: Daniele Orsato

15 October 2022 10	Torino	0–1	Juventus	Turin
18:00 CEST (UTC+2)	Linetty (yellow card) 60'; Lazaro (yellow card) 90+4'	Report	Vlahović 74'	Stadium: Stadio Olimpico Grande Torino; Attendance: 22,269; Referee: Maurizio Mariani

21 October 2022 11	Juventus	4–0	Empoli	Turin
20:45 CEST (UTC+2)	Kean 8'; Cuadrado (yellow card) 36'; McKennie 56'; Rabiot (yellow card) 58', (goal) 82', 90+4'	Report	Satriano (yellow card) 58'; Haas (yellow card) 69'	Stadium: Juventus Stadium; Attendance: 37,771; Referee: Michael Fabbri

29 October 2022 12	Lecce	0–1	Juventus	Lecce
18:00 CEST (UTC+2)	Ceesay (yellow card) 59'; Pongračić (yellow card) 71'; Di Francesco (yellow card) 90+2'	Report	Miretti (yellow card) 13'; Cuadrado (yellow card) 17'; Milik (yellow card) 23'; Gatti (yellow card) 29'; Fagioli 73'; Iling-Junior (yellow card) 79'	Stadium: Stadio Via del mare Attendance: 25,860; Referee: Daniele Chiffi

6 November 2022 13	Juventus	2–0	Internazionale	Turin
20:45 CET (UTC+1)	Rabiot 52'; Danilo (yellow card) 77'; Fagioli 85'; Szczęsny (yellow card) 90'	Report	Çalhanoğlu (yellow card) 56'; Škriniar (yellow card) 68'	Stadium: Juventus Stadium; Attendance: 40,387; Referee: Daniele Doveri

10 November 2022 14	Hellas Verona	0–1	Juventus	Verona
18:30 CET (UTC+1)	Dawidowicz (yellow card) 55'; Đurić (yellow card) 57'; Veloso (yellow card) 77'	Report	Bonucci (yellow card) 6'; Kean 60'; Alex Sandro (yellow card) 81', (red card) 90+3'	Stadium: Stadio Marcantonio Bentegodi; Attendance: 21,934; Referee: Marco Di Bello

13 November 2022 15	Juventus	3–0	Lazio	Turin
20:45 CET (UTC+1)	Gatti (yellow card) 25'; Bremer (yellow card) 27'; Kean 43', 54'; Milik 90'	Report	Milinković-Savić (yellow card) 28'	Stadium: Juventus Stadium; Attendance: 38,729; Referee: Davide Massa

4 January 2023 16	Cremonese	0–1	Juventus	Cremona
18:30 CET (UTC+1)	Ferrari (yellow card) 55'; Dessers (yellow card) 67'; Meïté (yellow card) 70'; Valeri (yellow card) 89'; Lochoshvili (yellow card) 90+3'	Report	Rabiot (yellow card) 71'; Bremer (yellow card) 72'; Milik 90+1'; Kean (yellow card) 90+5'	Stadium: Stadio Giovanni Zini; Attendance: 14,896; Referee: Giovanni Ayroldi

7 January 2023 17	Juventus	1–0	Udinese	Turin
18:00 CET (UTC+1)	Locatelli (yellow card) 36'; Danilo 86'	Report	Success (yellow card) 54'; Bijol (yellow card) 67'	Stadium: Juventus Stadium; Attendance: 39,536; Referee: Matteo Marchetti

13 January 2023 18	Napoli	5–1	Juventus	Naples
20:45 CET (UTC+1)	Osimhen 14', 65'; Kvaratskhelia 39'; Rrahmani 55'; Elmas 72'	Report	Di María 42'; Danilo (yellow card) 44'	Stadium: Stadio Diego Armando Maradona; Attendance: 51,361; Referee: Daniele Doveri

22 January 2023 19	Juventus	3–3	Atalanta	Turin
20:45 CET (UTC+1)	Di María 25'; Milik 34'; Danilo 65'; Chiesa (yellow card) 90+3'	Report	Lookman 5', 53'; Mæhle 46'; Éderson (yellow card) 49'; Hateboer (yellow card) 90+3'	Stadium: Juventus Stadium; Attendance: 33,565; Referee: Livio Marinelli

29 January 2023 20	Juventus	0–2	Monza	Turin
15:00 CET (UTC+1)		Report	Ciurria 18'; Mota 39'; Caprari (yellow card) 69'; Sensi (yellow card) 78'	Stadium: Juventus Stadium; Attendance: 39,393; Referee: Gianluca Aureliano

7 February 2023 21	Salernitana	0–3	Juventus	Salerno
20:45 CET (UTC+1)	Vilhena (yellow card) 23'	Report	Rabiot (yellow card) 16'; Vlahović 26' (pen.), 47'; Kostić 45'	Stadium: Stadio Arechi; Attendance: 26,945; Referee: Antonio Rapuano

12 February 2023 22	Juventus	1–0	Fiorentina	Turin
18:00 CET (UTC+1)	Rabiot (yellow card) 2', (goal) 34'; Alex Sandro (yellow card) 19'; Bremer (yellow card) 85'; Kostić (yellow card) 88'; Kean (yellow card) 90+6'	Report	Duncan (yellow card) 31'; Bonaventura (yellow card) 48'	Stadium: Juventus Stadium; Attendance: 34,844; Referee: Michael Fabbri

19 February 2023 23	Spezia	0–2	Juventus	Spezia
18:00 CET (UTC+1)	Agudelo (yellow card) 16'; Reca (yellow card) 55'	Report	Locatelli (yellow card) 1'; Kean 32'; Fagioli (yellow card) 51'; Di María 66'	Stadium: Stadio Alberto Picco; Attendance: 11,767; Referee: Federico La Penna

28 February 2023 24	Juventus	4–2	Torino	Turin
20:45 CET (UTC+1)	Cuadrado 16'; Danilo 45+1'; Bremer 71'; Rabiot 81'	Report	Karamoh 2'; Sanabria 43'; Rodriguez (yellow card) 60'; Ricci (yellow card) 90+5'	Stadium: Juventus Stadium; Attendance: 37,806; Referee: Daniele Chiffi

5 March 2023 25	Roma	1–0	Juventus	Rome
20:45 CET (UTC+1)	Matić (yellow card) 33'; Mancini 53'; Cristante (yellow card) 58'; Spinazzola (yellow card) 63'	Report	Locatelli (yellow card) 31'; Kostić (yellow card) 75'; Kean (red card) 90'	Stadium: Stadio Olimpico; Attendance: 64,213; Referee: Fabio Maresca

12 March 2023 26	Juventus	4–2	Sampdoria	Turin
20:45 CET (UTC+1)	Bremer 11'; Rabiot 26', 64'; Fagioli (yellow card) 58'; Vlahović (penalty missed) 69'; Soulé 90+4'	Report	Augello 31'; Đuričić 32'; Rincón (yellow card) 39'	Stadium: Juventus Stadium; Attendance: 35,166; Referee: Alessandro Prontera

19 March 2023 27	Internazionale	0–1	Juventus	Milan
20:45 CET (UTC+1)	Barella (yellow card) 30'; Brozović (yellow card) 90+7'; D'Ambrosio (yellow card) 90+7', (red card) 90+7'	Report	Kostić 23'; Gatti (yellow card) 31'; Rabiot (yellow card) 71'; Danilo (yellow card) 88'; Paredes (yellow card) 90+1', (red card) 90+7'	Stadium: San Siro; Attendance: 75,224; Referee: Daniele Chiffi

1 April 2023 28	Juventus	1–0	Hellas Verona	Turin
20:45 CEST (UTC+2)	Kean 55', (yellow card) 59'	Report	Depaoli (yellow card) 44'; Gaich (yellow card) 58'	Stadium: Juventus Stadium; Attendance: 40,105; Referee: Matteo Marchetti

8 April 2023 29	Lazio	2–1	Juventus	Rome
20:45 CEST (UTC+2)	Milinković-Savić 38', (yellow card) 86'; Zaccagni 53'; Provedel (yellow card) 78'	Report	Bonucci (yellow card) 40'; Rabiot 42'; Alex Sandro (yellow card) 45'; Locatelli (yellow card) 45+3'; Cuadrado (yellow card) 51'; Miretti (yellow card) 90+5'	Stadium: Stadio Olimpico; Attendance: 59,000; Referee: Marco Di Bello

16 April 2023 30	Sassuolo	1–0	Juventus	Reggio Emilia
18:00 CEST (UTC+2)	Defrel 64'	Report	Chiesa (yellow card) 90+5'	Stadium: Mapei Stadium – Città del Tricolore; Attendance: 19,566; Referee: Antonio Rapuano

23 April 2023 31	Juventus	0–1	Napoli	Turin
20:45 CEST (UTC+2)	Locatelli (yellow card) 23'; Rabiot (yellow card) 40'; Fagioli (yellow card) 85'; Di María (yellow card) 89'	Report	Raspadori 90+3'; Zambo Anguissa (yellow card) 90+8'	Stadium: Juventus Stadium; Attendance: 39,839; Referee: Michael Fabbri

30 April 2023 32	Bologna	1–1	Juventus	Bologna
20:45 CEST (UTC+2)	Posch (yellow card) 3'; Orsolini 10' (pen.); Kyriakopoulos (yellow card) 42'	Report	Milik (penalty missed) 31', 61'; Rabiot (yellow card) 55'; Paredes (yellow card) 88'	Stadium: Stadio Renato Dall'Ara; Attendance: 30,071; Referee: Simone Sozza

3 May 2023 33	Juventus	2–1	Lecce	Turin
18:00 CEST (UTC+2)	Paredes 15', (yellow card) 55'; Vlahović 40'; Bremer (yellow card) 76'	Report	Ceesay 37' (pen.); Umititi (yellow card) 48'; Pezzella (yellow card) 61'	Stadium: Juventus Stadium; Attendance: 33,757; Referee: Francesco Fourneau

7 May 2023 34	Atalanta	0–2	Juventus	Bergamo
12:30 CEST (UTC+2)	Mæhle (yellow card) 90+1'	Report	Iling-Junior 56'; Rabiot (yellow card) 62'; Vlahović 90+8', (yellow card) 90+9'	Stadium: Stadio Atleti Azzurri d'Italia; Attendance: 19,570; Referee: Daniele Doveri

14 May 2023 35	Juventus	2–0	Cremonese	Turin
20:45 CEST (UTC+2)	Fagioli 55'; Cuadrado (yellow card) 63'; Danilo (yellow card) 66'; Bremer 79'	Report		Stadium: Juventus Stadium; Attendance: 39,439; Referee: Daniele Chiffi

22 May 2023 36	Empoli	4–1	Juventus	Empoli
20:45 CEST (UTC+2)	Caputo 18' (pen.), 48'; Luperto 21'; Parisi (yellow card) 55'; Bandinelli (yellow card) 66'; Piccoli 90+3'	Report	Rabiot (yellow card) 56'; Paredes (yellow card) 76'; Chiesa 85'	Stadium: Stadio Carlo Castellani; Attendance: 15,519; Referee: Giovanni Ayroldi

28 May 2023 37	Juventus	0–1	Milan	Turin
20:45 CEST (UTC+2)	Cuadrado (yellow card) 56'	Report	Messias (yellow card) 34'; Giroud 40'; Krunić (yellow card) 64'	Stadium: Juventus Stadium; Attendance: 40,231; Referee: Maurizio Mariani

4 June 2023 38	Udinese	0–1	Juventus	Udine
21:00 CEST (UTC+2)	Arselan (yellow card) 89'; Nestorovski (yellow card) 89'	Report	Gatti (yellow card) 39'; Chiesa 68'; Paredes (yellow card) 88'	Stadium: Stadio Friuli; Attendance: 23,266; Referee: Marco Guida

=== Coppa Italia ===
19 January 2023 Round of 16	Juventus	2–1	Monza	Turin
21:00 CET (UTC+1)	Kean 8'; Chiesa 78'	Report	Valoti 24'; Antov (yellow card) 59'; Rovella (yellow card) 62'	Stadium: Juventus Stadium; Attendance: 25,190; Referee: Ivano Pezzuto

2 February 2023 Quarter-finals	Juventus	1–0	Lazio	Turin
21:00 CET (UTC+1)	Bremer 44'; Cuadrado (yellow card) 65'; Perin (yellow card) 79'; Danilo (yellow card) 84'	Report	Zaccagni (yellow card) 68'	Stadium: Juventus Stadium; Attendance: 21,581; Referee: Fabio Maresca

4 April 2023 Semi-finals; First leg	Juventus	1–1	Internazionale	Turin
21:00 CEST (UTC+2)	Cuadrado 83', (yellow card) 90+5', (red card) 90+7'; Miretti (yellow card) 89'	Report	Brozović (yellow card) 41'; Lukaku (yellow card) 80' (yellow-red card) 90+5', (goal) 90+5' (pen.); Handanović (red card) 90+7'	Stadium: Juventus Stadium; Attendance: 39,021; Referee: Davide Massa

26 April 2023 Semi-finals; Second leg	Internazionale	1–0 (2–1 agg.)	Juventus	Milan
21:00 CEST (UTC+2)	Dimarco 15'; Mkhitaryan (yellow card) 90+2'	Report	Locatelli (yellow card) 59'	Stadium: San Siro; Attendance: 75,491; Referee: Daniele Doveri

=== UEFA Champions League ===
==== Group stage ====
The draw for the group stage was held on 25 August 2022.

Pos	Team	Pld	W	D	L	GF	GA	GD	Pts	Qualification	BEN	PAR	JUV	MHA
1	(Portugal) Benfica	6	4	2	0	16	7	+9	14 (Note: Tied on head-to-head results, overall goal difference and overall goals scored. Overall away goals scored: Benfica 9, Paris Saint-Germain 6.)	Advance to knockout phase	—	1–1	4–3	2–0
2	(France) Paris Saint-Germain	6	4	2	0	16	7	+9	14	Advance to knockout phase	1–1	—	2–1	7–2
3	(Italy) Juventus	6	1	0	5	9	13	−4	3 (Note: Tied on head-to-head results. Overall goal difference is used as the tiebreaker.)	Transfer to Europa League	1–2	1–2	—	3–1
4	(Israel) Maccabi Haifa	6	1	0	5	7	21	−14	3		1–6	1–3	2–0	—

Source: UEFA
Rules for classification: Group stage tiebreakers
Notes:

6 September 2022 1	Paris Saint-Germain (France)	2–1	(Italy) Juventus	Paris, France
21:00 CEST (UTC+02:00)	Mbappé 5', 22'; Ramos (yellow card) 25'; Verratti (yellow card) 65'	Report	Bremer (yellow card) 25'; Miretti (yellow card) 45+1'; McKennie 53'; Danilo (yellow card) 73'	Stadium: Parc des Princes; Attendance: 47,415; Referee: Anthony Taylor (England)

14 September 2022 2	Juventus (Italy)	1–2	(Portugal) Benfica	Turin, Italy
21:00 CEST (UTC+02:00)	Milik 4'; Miretti (yellow card) 42'; Perin (yellow card) 45'; Danilo (yellow card) 59'; Paredes (yellow card) 73'	Report	Bah (yellow card) 26'; João Mário 43' (pen.), (yellow card) 45'; Neres 55'; Florentino (yellow card) 85'	Stadium: Juventus Stadium; Attendance: 34,015; Referee: Felix Zwayer (Germany)

5 October 2022 3	Juventus (Italy)	3–1	(Israel) Maccabi Haifa	Turin, Italy
21:00 CEST (UTC+02:00)	Rabiot 35', 83'; Vlahović 50'; Alex Sandro (yellow card) 80'	Report	Tchibota (yellow card) 52'; David 75'	Stadium: Juventus Stadium; Attendance: 28,498; Referee: Sandro Schärer (Switzerland)

11 October 2022 4	Maccabi Haifa (Israel)	2–0	(Italy) Juventus	Haifa, Israel
18:45 IDT (UTC+03:00)	Atzili 7', 42'; Cornud (yellow card) 27'	Report	McKennie (yellow card) 45+3'; Locatelli (yellow card) 76'	Stadium: Sammy Ofer Stadium; Attendance: 30,074; Referee: Antonio Mateu Lahoz (Spain)

25 October 2022 5	Benfica (Portugal)	4–3	(Italy) Juventus	Lisbon, Portugal
21:00 WEST (UTC+02:00)	A. Silva 17'; João Mário 28' (pen.); R. Silva 35', 50'; Fernández (yellow card) 84'	Report	Kean 21'; Danilo (yellow card) 62'; Milik 77'; McKennie 79'	Stadium: Estádio da Luz; Attendance: 60,131; Referee: Srđan Jovanović (Serbia)

2 November 2022 6	Juventus (Italy)	1–2	(France) Paris Saint-Germain	Turin, Italy
21:00 CET (UTC+01:00)	Gatti (yellow card) 15'; Bonucci 39'; Milik (yellow card) 45+2'; Fagioli (yellow card) 76'	Report	Mbappé 13'; Mendes 69'; Verratti (yellow card) 85'	Stadium: Juventus Stadium; Attendance: 41,089; Referee: Carlos del Cerro Grande (Spain)

=== UEFA Europa League ===
==== Knockout phase ====
===== Knockout round play-offs =====
The draw for the knockout round play-offs was held on 7 November 2022.

16 February 2023 First leg	Juventus (Italy)	1–1	(France) Nantes	Turin, Italy
21:00 CET (UTC+01:00)	Vlahović 13'; Chiesa (yellow card) 54'; Danilo (yellow card) 75'	Report	Castelletto (yellow card) 45+1'; Mohamed (yellow card) 57'; Blas 60'; Corchia (yellow card) 90'	Stadium: Juventus Stadium; Attendance: 41,019; Referee: João Pinheiro (Portugal)

23 February 2023 Second leg	Nantes (France)	0–3 (1–4 agg.)	(Italy) Juventus	Nantes, France
18:45 CET (UTC+01:00)	Pallois (red card) 17'; Traoré (yellow card) 81'; Lafont (yellow card) 90+4'	Report	Di María 5', 20' (pen.), 78'; Cuadrado (yellow card) 87'	Stadium: Stade de la Beaujoire; Attendance: 34,420; Referee: José María Sánchez Martínez (Spain)

===== Round of 16 =====
The draw for the round of 16 was held on 24 February 2023.

9 March 2023 First leg	Juventus (Italy)	1–0	(Germany) SC Freiburg	Turin, Italy
21:00 CET (UTC+01:00)	Di María 53'; Bremer (yellow card) 72'; Bonucci (yellow card) 84'	Report	Ginter (yellow card) 24'; Höler (yellow card) 51'	Stadium: Juventus Stadium; Attendance: 37,474; Referee: Anastasios Sidiropoulos (Greece)

16 March 2023 Second leg	SC Freiburg (Germany)	0–2 (0–3 agg.)	(Italy) Juventus	Freiburg im Breisgau, Germany
18:45 CET (UTC+01:00)	Gulde (yellow card) 26' (yellow-red card) 44'; Höfler (yellow card) 44'; Sallai (yellow card) 87'	Report	Vlahović 45' (pen.), (yellow card) 56'; Iling-Junior (yellow card) 82'; Chiesa 90+5'	Stadium: Europa-Park Stadion; Attendance: 33,420; Referee: Serdar Gözübüyük (Netherlands)

===== Quarter-finals =====
The draw for the quarter-finals was held on 17 March 2023, 13:00 CET.

13 April 2023 First leg	Juventus (Italy)	1–0	(Portugal) Sporting CP	Turin, Italy
21:00 CEST (UTC+02:00)	Rabiot (yellow card) 24'; Vlahović (yellow card) 66'; Gatti 73'	Report	Inácio (yellow card) 20'	Stadium: Juventus Stadium; Attendance: 38,490; Referee: Halil Umut Meler (Turkey)

20 April 2023 Second leg	Sporting CP (Portugal)	1–1 (1–2 agg.)	(Italy) Juventus	Lisbon, Portugal
21:00 WEST (UTC+02:00)	Edwards 20' (pen.), (yellow card) 90+3'; Ugarte (yellow card) 24'	Report	Rabiot 9'; Gatti (yellow card) 83'; Pogba (yellow card) 89'	Stadium: Estádio José Alvalade; Attendance: 45,903; Referee: François Letexier (France)

===== Semi-finals =====
The draw for the semi-finals was held on 17 March 2023, 13:00 CET, after the quarter-final draw.

11 May 2023 First leg	Juventus (Italy)	1–1	(Spain) Sevilla	Turin, Italy
21:00 CEST (UTC+02:00)	Rabiot (yellow card) 43'; Locatelli (yellow card) 77'; Chiesa (yellow card) 79'; Gatti 90+7'	Report	En-Nesyri 26'; Rakitić (yellow card) 72'; Gil (yellow card) 78'; Badé (yellow card) 82'; Lamela (yellow card) 90+3'	Stadium: Juventus Stadium; Attendance: 34,816; Referee: Daniel Siebert (Germany)

18 May 2023 Second leg	Sevilla (Spain)	2–1 (a.e.t.) (3–2 agg.)	(Italy) Juventus	Seville, Spain
21:00 CEST (UTC+02:00)	Acuña (yellow card) 57' (yellow-red card) 115'; Suso 71', (yellow card) 117'; Lamela 95'; Montiel (yellow card) 120+4'	Report	Kean (yellow card) 11'; Vlahović 65'; Danilo (yellow card) 105'; Paredes (yellow card) 117'	Stadium: Ramón Sánchez Pizjuán; Attendance: 42,186; Referee: Danny Makkelie (Netherlands)

== Statistics ==
=== Appearances and goals ===
No.	Pos	Nat	Player	Total		Serie A		Coppa Italia		Champions League		Europa League	
No.	Pos	Nat	Player	Apps	Goals	Apps	Goals	Apps	Goals	Apps	Goals	Apps	Goals
Goalkeepers
1	GK	(Poland) POL	Wojciech Szczęsny	40	0	28	0	0	0	4	0	8	0
36	GK	(Italy) ITA	Mattia Perin	18	0	10+1	0	4	0	2	0	0+1	0
Defenders
2	DF	(Italy) ITA	Mattia De Sciglio	25	0	11+6	0	1+1	0	1+2	0	2+1	0
3	DF	(Brazil) BRA	Bremer	43	5	30	4	3	1	3	0	7	0
6	DF	(Brazil) BRA	Danilo	54	3	35+2	3	3+1	0	5	0	8	0
12	DF	(Brazil) BRA	Alex Sandro	37	0	21+4	0	2+1	0	2+2	0	5	0
15	DF	(Italy) ITA	Federico Gatti	27	2	16+2	0	2	0	2	0	3+2	2
19	DF	(Italy) ITA	Leonardo Bonucci	26	1	9+7	1	1	0	5+1	0	1+2	0
24	DF	(Italy) ITA	Daniele Rugani	11	0	6+3	0	1	0	1	0	0	0
42	DF	(Italy) ITA	Tommaso Barbieri	4	0	2+1	0	0	0	0+1	0	0	0
Midfielders
5	MF	(Italy) ITA	Manuel Locatelli	49	0	29+3	0	3+1	0	2+3	0	7+1	0
10	MF	(France) FRA	Paul Pogba	10	0	1+5	0	0+1	0	0	0	0+3	0
11	MF	(Colombia) COL	Juan Cuadrado	47	2	24+7	1	2	1	6	0	6+2	0
17	MF	(Serbia) SRB	Filip Kostić	54	3	33+4	3	3	0	5+1	0	5+3	0
20	MF	(Italy) ITA	Fabio Miretti	40	0	14+13	0	2+2	0	3+2	0	3+1	0
25	MF	(France) FRA	Adrien Rabiot	48	11	31+1	8	3	0	5	2	8	1
32	MF	(Argentina) ARG	Leandro Paredes	35	1	8+17	1	1+1	0	4	0	1+3	0
44	MF	(Italy) ITA	Nicolò Fagioli	37	3	17+9	3	3	0	1+1	0	4+2	0
45	MF	(Argentina) ARG	Enzo Barrenechea	5	0	3	0	0	0	0+1	0	0+1	0
Forwards
7	FW	(Italy) ITA	Federico Chiesa	33	4	6+15	2	2+2	1	0+1	0	3+4	1
9	FW	(Serbia) SRB	Dušan Vlahović	42	14	22+5	10	2	0	5	1	5+3	3
14	FW	(Poland) POL	Arkadiusz Milik	39	9	17+10	7	0+3	0	3+2	2	1+3	0
18	FW	(Italy) ITA	Moise Kean	40	8	11+17	6	1+1	1	1+4	1	3+2	0
22	FW	(Argentina) ARG	Ángel Di María	40	8	15+11	4	2+2	0	2+1	0	7	4
30	FW	(Argentina) ARG	Matías Soulé	19	1	4+9	1	1	0	0+3	0	0+2	0
43	FW	(England) ENG	Samuel Iling-Junior	18	1	1+11	1	1	0	0+1	0	1+3	0
Players transferred during the season
8	MF	(United States) USA	Weston McKennie	21	3	13+2	1	1	0	4+1	2	0	0
13	MF	(Italy) ITA	Nicolò Rovella	3	0	0+3	0	0	0	0	0	0	0
28	MF	(Switzerland) SUI	Denis Zakaria	2	0	1+1	0	0	0	0	0	0	0

=== Goalscorers ===
Rank	No.	Pos.	Player	Serie A	Coppa Italia	Champions League	Europa League	Total
1	9	FW	(Serbia) Dušan Vlahović	10	0	1	3	14
2	25	MF	(France) Adrien Rabiot	8	0	2	1	11
3	14	FW	(Poland) Arkadiusz Milik	7	0	2	0	9
4	18	FW	(Italy) Moise Kean	6	1	1	0	8
4	22	FW	(Argentina) Ángel Di María	4	0	0	4	8
6	3	DF	(Brazil) Bremer	4	1	0	0	5
7	7	FW	(Italy) Federico Chiesa	2	1	0	1	4
8	6	DF	(Brazil) Danilo	3	0	0	0	3
8	8	MF	(United States) Weston McKennie	1	0	2	0	3
8	17	MF	(Serbia) Filip Kostić	3	0	0	0	3
8	44	MF	(Italy) Nicolò Fagioli	3	0	0	0	3
12	11	MF	(Colombia) Juan Cuadrado	1	1	0	0	2
12	15	DF	(Italy) Federico Gatti	0	0	0	2	2
12	19	DF	(Italy) Leonardo Bonucci	1	0	1	0	2
15	30	FW	(Argentina) Matías Soulé	1	0	0	0	1
15	32	MF	(Argentina) Leandro Paredes	1	0	0	0	1
15	43	FW	(England) Samuel Iling-Junior	1	0	0	0	1
Totals				56	4	9	11	80

== See also ==
- 2022–23 Juventus Next Gen season
