= 2021–22 Juventus FC season =

Italian football club season

Juventus
2021–22 season
- Chairman: Andrea Agnelli
- Head coach: Massimiliano Allegri
- Stadium: Juventus Stadium
- Serie A: 4th
- Coppa Italia: Runners-up
- Supercoppa Italiana: Runners-up
- UEFA Champions League: Round of 16
- Top goalscorer: League: Paulo Dybala (10); All: Paulo Dybala (15)
- Highest home attendance: 40,515 vs Lazio (16 May 2022, Serie A)
- Lowest home attendance: 5,000 (Note: The total capacity of the stadium was established with a maximum limit of 5,000 attendance due to the COVID-19 pandemic in Italy.) vs Udinese (15 January 2022, Serie A); 5,000 vs Sampdoria (18 January 2022, Coppa Italia)
- Average home league attendance: 23,808 (Note: The average home league attendance is related to the total capacity of the stadium which was established from matchday 1 to 7 at 50%, from matchday 8 to 19 at 75%, on matchdays 20 and 21 at 50%, on matchdays 22 and 23 with a maximum limit of 5,000 attendance, from matchday 24 to 26 (one match) at 50%, and from matchday 27 to 30 at 75% due to the COVID-19 pandemic in Italy.)
- Biggest win: Malmö FF 0–3 Juventus; Juventus 4–1 Sampdoria
- Biggest defeat: Chelsea 4–0 Juventus
Home colours	Away colours	Third colours

The 2021–22 season was Juventus Football Club's 124th season in existence and the club's 15th consecutive season in the top flight of Italian football. In addition to the domestic league, Juventus participated in this season's edition of the Coppa Italia, the Supercoppa Italiana, and the UEFA Champions League.

Juventus finished the season trophyless for the first time since 2010–11.

== Season summary ==
=== Pre-season ===
On 11 May 2021, Gianluigi Buffon announced that he would leave Juventus at end of the previous season. On 28 May, Andrea Pirlo was sacked and Massimiliano Allegri was chosen in his place as team's coach. On 15 June, Juventus announced that Álvaro Morata's loan had been renewed.

=== July ===
On 24 July, Juventus played a friendly match against Serie C side Cesena, winning 3–1, through goals scored by Koni De Winter, Weston McKennie, and Matías Soulé. On 31 July, Juventus won their 11th Trofeo Luigi Berlusconi, winning 2–1 against Serie B side Monza at Stadio Brianteo through goals scored by Filippo Ranocchia in the 13th minute and Dejan Kulusevski in the 53rd minute.

=== August ===
On 2 August, Juventus announced that Giorgio Chiellini's contract had been renewed. On 8 August, Juventus played the Joan Gamper Trophy against Spanish La Liga side Barcelona at Johan Cruyff Stadium, losing 3–0. On 14 August, Juventus played a friendly match against Serie A side Atalanta, winning 3–1, thanks to goals scored by Paulo Dybala, Federico Bernardeschi, and Álvaro Morata. On 17 August, Juventus announced that Kaio Jorge's purchase had been officialised from Brazilian Série A side Santos. On 18 August, Juventus announced that Manuel Locatelli's purchase had been officialised from Serie A side Sassuolo. On 19 August, Juventus played the last pre-season friendly match against Serie C side Juventus U23, winning 3–0, through goals scored by Dybala, Morata, and Aaron Ramsey.

On 22 August, Juventus made their official season debut, drawing 2–2 against Udinese. Dybala scored after three minutes to the start and Juan Cuadrado doubled the result in the 23rd minute. In the 51st minute, the referee awarded a penalty kick after Juventus' goalkeeper Wojciech Szczęsny fouled Tolgay Arslan; Roberto Pereyra scored from the spot reducing the disadvantage. In the 83rd minute, Stefano Okaka scored the equalizing goal due to a Szczęsny mistake. On 28 August, Juventus lost 1–0 against Empoli in the second matchday due to a Leonardo Mancuso's goal in the 21st minute. On 31 August, Juventus announced that Cristiano Ronaldo had been sold to English Premier League side Manchester United, as well as Moise Kean's purchase from another English side, Everton.

=== September ===
On 14 September, Juventus made their debut in UEFA Champions League against Swedish side Malmö FF, winning 0–3. The match resulted in being the first season victory: in the 23rd minute, Alex Sandro scored the opening goal through a header from a Juan Cuadrado's cross; in the 45th minute, the captain Paulo Dybala scored his penalty caused by a foul on Álvaro Morata; one minute later, in the additional time, again Morata scored the third overall goal.

=== October ===
On 2 October, Juventus played the Derby della Mole against Torino side, winning 0–1. Manuel Locatelli scored the only goal late in the second half. The same result was achieved against Roma on 17 October; Moise Kean scored in the 16th minute.

On 24 October, Juventus played the Derby d'Italia against Internazionale, drawing 1–1: Paulo Dybala equalised the score on penalty late in the second half, after the first goal scored by Edin Džeko in the first period.

=== November ===
On 2 November, Juventus qualified to the knockout phase of the UEFA Champions League thanks to the 4–2 win against Russian side Zenit Saint Petersburg. Paulo Dybala scored twice, including a penalty, followed by other two goals scored by Federico Chiesa and Álvaro Morata, respectively. Zenit Saint Petersburg's goals were provided by Leonardo Bonucci's own goal and Sardar Azmoun.

=== December ===
On 8 December, Juventus achieved first position in the group stage of the UEFA Champions League with 15 points. Home win 1–0 against Malmö FF with the only goal scored by Moise Kean in the 18th minute and 3–3 between Zenit Saint Petersburg and Chelsea meant Juventus was seeded in the knockout phase round of 16 draw.

=== January ===
On 6 January, as the championship returned for its second leg, Juventus drew 1–1 against Napoli. Dries Mertens scored in the first half; his goal was equalized by Federico Chiesa in the second period. On 9 January, Juventus went against Roma, achieving a 4–3 comeback. In the first half, Tammy Abraham scored for Roma, followed by a Paulo Dybala's goal. In the second period, Henrikh Mkhitaryan put Roma in front, with Lorenzo Pellegrini scoring the third goal for the home team. In less than eights minutes, Juventus scored three times: Manuel Locatelli, Dejan Kulusevski and Mattia De Sciglio completed the comeback. Later in the second half, Matthijs de Ligt was sent off, costing a penalty, and offering Roma the chance to equalise the match, but Lorenzo Pellegrini's penalty was saved by Wojciech Szczęsny.

On 12 January 2022, Juventus played their 17th Supercoppa Italiana against Internazionale, losing 2–1 on extra time. Weston McKennie opened the score in the 25th minute, but Lautaro Martínez put Internazionale on level in the 35th minute by penalty. In the last additional minute in the second half on extra time Alexis Sánchez scored the decisive goal.

On 18 January, Juventus made the debut in Coppa Italia against Sampdoria, starting from Round of 16. The match ended with a 4–1 win to Juventus, which meant that they qualified for the quarter-finals. Juan Cuadrado, Daniele Rugani, Paulo Dybala and Álvaro Morata, on penalty, scored for the home team, while the only goal for Sampdoria was provided by Andrea Conti.

On 28 January, Juventus announced that Serbian forward Dušan Vlahović had been bought from Serie A side Fiorentina. On 31 January, Italian defender Federico Gatti was bought from Serie B side Frosinone. He was sent on loan to the same team until June 2022. Uruguayan midfielder Rodrigo Bentancur was sold to English Premier League side Tottenham Hotspur, along with Swedish midfielder Dejan Kulusevski, but on loan until June 2023 with obligation to buy. Swiss midfielder Denis Zakaria was bought from German Bundesliga side Borussia Mönchengladbach, and Welsh midfielder Aaron Ramsey was sent on loan to Scottish Premiership side Rangers until June 2022 with option to buy.

=== February ===
On 10 February, Juventus faced Sassuolo in the quarter-finals of the Coppa Italia, and won 2–1. Paulo Dybala scored in the third minute, with Hamed Traorè equalizing the score in the 24th minute. An own goal in favour of Juventus late in the second half permitted the home team to qualify for the semi-finals.

On 18 February, Juventus played the Derby della Mole return match against Torino, drawing 1–1. Matthijs de Ligt opened the score in the 13th minute, whose goal was put on level by Andrea Belotti in the 62nd minute.

On 22 February, Juventus restarted their campaign in the Champions League, going against Spanish La Liga side Villarreal in the Round of 16 first leg. The final score was 1–1: Dušan Vlahović put Juventus in front in the first minute, while in the second half Dani Parejo equalised the result.

=== March ===
On 2 March, Juventus went against Fiorentina in the semi-finals first leg of the Coppa Italia: thanks to a Lorenzo Venuti's own goal late in the second half Juventus won 1–0.

On 16 March, Juventus faced Spanish La Liga side Villarreal in the Champions League Round of 16 second leg, losing 3–0. Gerard Moreno, Pau Torres and Arnaut Danjuma secured Villarreal's qualification to the next round. Juventus were then eliminated from the competition with an aggregate score of 4–1.

=== April ===
On 3 April, Juventus played the return match of Derby d'Italia. It resulted in a 1–0 win for Internazionale: Hakan Çalhanoğlu scored on penalty in the additional time of the first half.

On 20 April, Juventus went against Fiorentina in the semi-finals second leg of the Coppa Italia, winning 2–0. Federico Bernardeschi and Danilo secured the qualification to the final with an aggregate score of 3–0.

=== May ===
On 11 May, Juventus played the final of the Coppa Italia in the Derby d'Italia against Internazionale. It ended after extra time, 2–4 in favour of Internazionale. Nicolò Barella opened the score in the seventh minute. In the second half, Alex Sandro in the 50th minute and Dušan Vlahović two minutes later put Juventus in front, before Hakan Çalhanoğlu equalised the score in 80th minute via a penalty. During the extra time, Ivan Perišić scored twice, in the 99th minute and a penalty in the 102nd minute.

On 21 May, Juventus faced Fiorentina for their last match of the season, losing 2–0. Juventus concluded the Serie A in the fourth place which meant they qualified for the 2022–23 UEFA Champions League, starting from the group stage phase.

== Players ==
=== Squad information ===
Players, appearances, goals and squad numbers last updated on 16 May 2022. Appearances and goals include league matches only.
Note: Flags indicate national team as has been defined under FIFA eligibility rules. Players may hold more than one non-FIFA nationality.

No.	Player	Nat.	Position(s)	Date of birth (age)	Signed in	Contract ends	Signed from	Transfer fee	Apps.	Goals
Goalkeepers
1	Wojciech Szczęsny	(Poland)	GK	18 April 1990 (aged 32)	2017	2024	(England) Arsenal	€12M	124	0
23	Carlo Pinsoglio	(Italy)	GK	16 March 1990 (aged 32)	2014	2023	(Italy) Youth Sector	N/A	4	0
36	Mattia Perin	(Italy)	GK	10 November 1992 (aged 29)	2018	2025	(Italy) Genoa	€12M	12	0
Defenders
2	Mattia De Sciglio	(Italy)	RB / RWB / LB / LWB	20 October 1992 (aged 29)	2017	2025	(Italy) Milan	€12M	55	2
3	Giorgio Chiellini (c)	(Italy)	CB	14 August 1984 (aged 37)	2005	2023	(Italy) Fiorentina	€7.4M	416	27
4	Matthijs de Ligt	(Netherlands)	CB	12 August 1999 (aged 22)	2019	2024	(Netherlands) Ajax	€75M	74	6
6	Danilo	(Brazil)	CB / RB / RWB	15 July 1991 (aged 30)	2019	2024	(England) Manchester City	€37M	67	3
11	Juan Cuadrado	(Colombia)	RB / RWB / RW	26 May 1988 (aged 34)	2016	2023	(England) Chelsea	€25M	181	19
12	Alex Sandro	(Brazil)	LB / LWB	26 January 1991 (aged 31)	2015	2023	(Portugal) Porto	€26M	180	13
17	Luca Pellegrini	(Italy)	LB / LWB	7 March 1999 (aged 23)	2019	2023	(Italy) Roma	€22M	9	0
19	Leonardo Bonucci	(Italy)	CB	1 May 1987 (aged 35)	2018	2024	(Italy) Milan	€35M	332	24
24	Daniele Rugani	(Italy)	CB	29 July 1994 (aged 27)	2015	2023	(Italy) Empoli	€3.5M	84	6
45	Koni De Winter	(Belgium)	CB / RB	12 June 2002 (aged 20)	2021	2024	(Italy) Youth Sector	N/A	0	0
Midfielders
5	Arthur	(Brazil)	CM	12 August 1996 (aged 25)	2020	2025	(Spain) Barcelona	€72M	31	1
14	Weston McKennie	(United States)	CM	28 August 1998 (aged 23)	2020	2025	(Germany) Schalke 04	€22M	51	8
20	Federico Bernardeschi	(Italy)	RW / LW / AM	16 February 1994 (aged 28)	2017	2022	(Italy) Fiorentina	€40M	124	8
22	Federico Chiesa	(Italy)	AM / RW	25 October 1997 (aged 24)	2020	2022	(Italy) Fiorentina (loan)	€10M	44	10
25	Adrien Rabiot	(France)	CM	3 April 1995 (aged 27)	2019	2023	(France) Paris Saint-Germain	Free	80	5
27	Manuel Locatelli	(Italy)	CM	8 January 1998 (aged 24)	2021	2023	(Italy) Sassuolo (loan)	Free	23	3
28	Denis Zakaria	(Switzerland)	CM	20 November 1996 (aged 25)	2022	2026	(Germany) Borussia Mönchengladbach	€4.5M	0	0
47	Fabio Miretti	(Italy)	CM	3 August 2003 (aged 18)	2021	2026	(Italy) Youth Sector	N/A	0	0
56	Martin Palumbo	(Norway)	CM	5 March 2002 (aged 20)	2021	2022	(Italy) Udinese (loan)	Free	0	0
Forwards
7	Dušan Vlahović	(Serbia)	ST	28 January 2000 (aged 22)	2022	2026	(Italy) Fiorentina	€70M	0	0
9	Álvaro Morata	(Spain)	ST	23 October 1992 (aged 29)	2020	2022	(Spain) Atlético Madrid (loan)	€10M	117	31
10	Paulo Dybala	(Argentina)	RW / AM / SS	15 November 1993 (aged 28)	2015	2022	(Italy) Palermo	€32M	198	79
18	Moise Kean	(Italy)	ST	28 February 2000 (aged 22)	2021	2023	(England) Everton (loan)	€7M	33	10
21	Kaio Jorge	(Brazil)	ST	24 January 2002 (aged 20)	2021	2026	(Brazil) Santos	€1.5M	9	0
38	Marley Aké	(France)	LW / AM	5 January 2001 (aged 21)	2021	2025	(France) Marseille	€8M	0	0
43	Marco Da Graca	(Italy)	ST	1 May 2002 (aged 20)	2020	2024	(Italy) Youth Sector	N/A	0	0
46	Matías Soulé	(Argentina)	RW / AM / SS	15 April 2003 (aged 19)	2021	2024	(Italy) Youth Sector	N/A	2	0
Players transferred during the season
7	Cristiano Ronaldo	(Portugal)	LW / ST	5 February 1985 (aged 37)	2018	2022	(Spain) Real Madrid	€100M^{a}	98	81
8	Aaron Ramsey	(Wales)	CM / AM	26 December 1990 (aged 31)	2019	2023	(England) Arsenal	Free	49	5
30	Rodrigo Bentancur	(Uruguay)	CM	25 June 1997 (aged 25)	2017	2024	(Argentina) Boca Juniors	€9.5M	133	2
44	Dejan Kulusevski	(Sweden)	CM / RW	25 April 2000 (aged 22)	2020	2024	(Italy) Atalanta	€35M	55	5

a. Additional costs of €12 million to be paid.

== Transfers ==
=== Summer 2021 ===
==== In ====
Date	Pos.	Player	Age	Moving from	Fee	Notes	Source
1 July 2021	GK	(Italy) Mattia Perin	28	(Italy) Genoa	Free	End of loan	
1 July 2021	DF	(Italy) Mattia De Sciglio	28	(France) Lyon	Free	End of loan	
1 July 2021	DF	(Italy) Luca Pellegrini	22	(Italy) Genoa	Free	End of loan	
1 July 2021	DF	(Italy) Daniele Rugani	26	(Italy) Cagliari	Free	End of loan	
1 July 2021	MF	(Italy) Hans Nicolussi	21	(Italy) Parma	Free	End of loan	
1 July 2021	FW	(Croatia) Marko Pjaca	26	(Italy) Genoa	Free	End of loan	
17 August 2021	FW	(Brazil) Kaio Jorge	19	(Brazil) Santos	€1.5M	€1.5M + €1M variables	
18 August 2021	MF	(Italy) Manuel Locatelli	23	(Italy) Sassuolo	Free	On loan with obligation to buy in 2023 for €25M + €12.5M variables	
31 August 2021	FW	(Italy) Moise Kean	21	(England) Everton	€7M	On loan with obligation to buy in 2023 for €28M + €3M variables	

==== Out ====
Date	Pos.	Player	Age	Moving to	Fee	Notes	Source
17 June 2021 (Note: The transfer was officialised before the opening of the summer transfer window on 1 July 2021.)	GK	(Italy) Gianluigi Buffon	43	(Italy) Parma	Free	End of contract	
9 July 2021	FW	(Albania) Giacomo Vrioni	22	(Austria) WSG Tirol	Free	On loan until June 2022	
27 July 2021	MF	(Italy) Alessandro Di Pardo	22	(Italy) Vicenza	Free	On loan until June 2022	
28 July 2021	FW	(Croatia) Marko Pjaca	26	(Italy) Torino	Free	On loan with option to buy for €7M	
30 July 2021	DF	(Italy) Gianluca Frabotta	22	(Italy) Hellas Verona	Free	On loan with option to buy	
6 August 2021	DF	(Turkey) Merih Demiral	23	(Italy) Atalanta	€3M	On loan with option to buy for €25M	
13 August 2021	FW	(Portugal) Félix Correia	20	(Italy) Parma	Free	On loan with option to buy	
31 August 2021	DF	(Romania) Radu Drăgușin	19	(Italy) Sampdoria	Free	On loan until June 2022	
31 August 2021	MF	(Italy) Nicolò Fagioli	20	(Italy) Cremonese	Free	On loan until June 2022	
31 August 2021	FW	(Portugal) Cristiano Ronaldo	36	(England) Manchester United	€15M	Variables for €8M	

==== Other acquisitions ====
Date	Pos.	Player	Age	Moving from	Fee	Notes	Source
3 March 2021	MF	(United States) Weston McKennie	22	(Germany) Schalke 04	€18.5M	From loan to definitive purchase	
4 May 2021	DF	(Netherlands) Dean Huijsen	16	(Spain) Málaga	€0.2M	To play with Juventus U17	
15 June 2021	FW	(Spain) Álvaro Morata	28	(Spain) Atlético Madrid	€10M	Loan renewal	
1 July 2021	FW	(Brazil) Douglas Costa	30	(Germany) Bayern Munich	Free	End of loan	
15 July 2021	DF	(Switzerland) Albian Hajdari	18	(Switzerland) Basel	Free	End of loan to play with Juventus U19	
29 July 2021	FW	(Italy) Nicolò Cudrig	18	(France) Monaco	Free	To play with Juventus U23	
30 July 2021	MF	(Italy) Alessandro Sersanti	19	(Italy) Fiorentina	Free	To play with Juventus U23	
9 August 2021	DF	(Italy) Fabrizio Poli	32	(Italy) Virtus Entella	Free	To play with Juventus U23	
9 August 2021	MF	(Italy) Emanuele Zuelli	19	(Italy) Chievo	Free	To play with Juventus U23	
10 August 2021	DF	(Bosnia and Herzegovina) Tarik Muharemović	18	(Austria) Wolfsberger AC	Free	To play with Juventus U19	
27 August 2021	MF	(Norway) Martin Palumbo	19	(Italy) Udinese	Free	On loan with option to buy to play with Juventus U23	
31 August 2021	MF	(Netherlands) Mohamed Ihattaren	19	(Netherlands) PSV Eindhoven	€5.5M		

==== Other disposals ====
Date	Pos.	Player	Age	Moving to	Fee	Notes	Source
21 May 2021	FW	(Brazil) Douglas Costa	30	(Brazil) Grêmio	Free	On loan until June 2022	
27 May 2021	DF	(Brazil) Lucas Rosa	21	(Spain) Valladolid	Free	End of contract	
22 June 2021	FW	(Italy) Marco Olivieri	21	(Italy) Lecce	Free	On loan with option to buy	
1 July 2021	GK	(Italy) Timothy Nocchi	30	N/A	Free	End of contract	
1 July 2021	DF	(Italy) Raffaele Alcibiade	31	N/A	Free	End of contract	
1 July 2021	MF	(Italy) Michele Troiano	36	N/A	Free	Retired	
9 July 2021	FW	(Italy) Luca Zanimacchia	22	(Italy) Cremonese	Free	On loan until June 2022	
14 July 2021	FW	(Denmark) Nikolai Baden Frederiksen	21	(Netherlands) Vitesse	€1.83M		
15 July 2021	DF	(Italy) Pietro Beruatto	22	(Italy) Pisa	Free	On loan with option to buy	
15 July 2021	MF	(Germany) Idrissa Touré	23	(Italy) Pisa	€1M		
20 July 2021	DF	(Italy) Riccardo Capellini	21	(Spain) Mirandés	Free	On loan until June 2022	
21 July 2021	GK	(Italy) Stefano Gori	25	(Italy) Como	Free	On loan until June 2022	
21 July 2021	DF	(Italy) Paolo Gozzi	20	(Spain) Fuenlabrada	Free	On loan with option to buy	
23 July 2021	DF	(Italy) Luca Coccolo	23	(Italy) SPAL	Free	On loan with option to buy	
3 August 2021	FW	(Italy) Ferdinando Del Sole	23	(Italy) Ancona	Free	On loan with option to buy	
6 August 2021	GK	(Italy) Mattia Del Favero	23	(Italy) Cosenza	Free	On loan with option to buy	
6 August 2021	DF	(Italy) Alessandro Minelli	22	(Italy) Cosenza	Free	On loan until June 2022	
6 August 2021	DF	(Argentina) Cristian Romero	23	(Italy) Atalanta	€16M	Redeem after loan	
9 August 2021	FW	(Italy) Matteo Brunori	26	(Italy) Palermo	Free	On loan until June 2022	
14 August 2021	MF	(Cyprus) Grigoris Kastanos	23	(Italy) Salernitana	Free	On loan with option to buy	
18 August 2021	DF	(Switzerland) Nikita Vlasenko	20	(Netherlands) Excelsior	Free	On loan until June 2022	
18 August 2021	MF	(Tunisia) Hamza Rafia	22	(Belgium) Standard Liège	Free	On loan with option to buy	
19 August 2021	MF	(Belgium) Daouda Peeters	22	(Belgium) Standard Liège	Free	On loan with option to buy	
21 August 2021	DF	(Italy) Erasmo Mulè	22	(Italy) Cesena	Free	On loan until June 2022	
25 August 2021	DF	(Italy) Giuseppe Verduci	19	(Italy) Grosseto	Free	On loan until June 2022	
25 August 2021	FW	(Italy) Mirco Lipari	19	(Italy) Juve Stabia	Free	On loan until June 2022	
26 August 2021	DF	(Italy) Dario Del Fabro	26	(Belgium) Seraing	Free	On loan until June 2022	
27 August 2021	FW	(Spain) Alejandro Marqués	21	(Spain) Mirandés	Free	On loan until June 2022	
31 August 2021	DF	(Italy) Filippo Delli Carri	22	(Italy) Salernitana	Free	On loan until June 2022	
31 August 2021	DF	(Brazil) Wesley	21	(Switzerland) Sion	Free	On loan until June 2022	
31 August 2021	MF	(Italy) Luca Clemenza	24	(Italy) Pescara	Free	On loan until June 2023	
31 August 2021	MF	(Netherlands) Mohamed Ihattaren	19	(Italy) Sampdoria	Free	On loan until June 2022	
31 August 2021	MF	(Italy) Filippo Ranocchia	20	(Italy) Vicenza	Free	On loan until June 2022	

=== Winter 2021–22 ===
==== In ====
Date	Pos.	Player	Age	Moving from	Fee	Notes	Source
28 January 2022	FW	(Serbia) Dušan Vlahović	22	(Italy) Fiorentina	€70M	Variables for €10M	
31 January 2022	MF	(Switzerland) Denis Zakaria	25	(Germany) Borussia Mönchengladbach	€4.5M	Plus €4.1M additional costs	

==== Out ====
Date	Pos.	Player	Age	Moving to	Fee	Notes	Source
31 January 2022	MF	(Uruguay) Rodrigo Bentancur	24	(England) Tottenham Hotspur	€19M	Variables for €6M	
31 January 2022	MF	(Sweden) Dejan Kulusevski	21	(England) Tottenham Hotspur	€10M	On loan until June 2023 with obligation to buy for €35M + €9M variables	
31 January 2022	MF	(Wales) Aaron Ramsey	31	(Scotland) Rangers	Free	On loan until June 2022 with option to buy for €6M	

==== Other acquisitions ====
Date	Pos.	Player	Age	Moving from	Fee	Notes	Source
11 January 2022	GK	(Italy) Mattia Del Favero	23	(Italy) Cosenza	Free	End of loan	
13 January 2022	DF	(Italy) Luca Coccolo	23	(Italy) SPAL	Free	End of loan	
14 January 2022	FW	(Switzerland) Christopher Lungoyi	21	(Switzerland) Lugano	Free	End of loan	
21 January 2022	DF	(Italy) Alessandro Minelli	22	(Italy) Cosenza	Free	End of loan	
21 January 2022	FW	(Italy) Simone Iocolano	32	(Italy) Lecco	Free	To play with Juventus U23	
27 January 2022	FW	(Italy) Mirco Lipari	19	(Italy) Juve Stabia	Free	End of loan to play with Juventus U23	
29 January 2022	MF	(Italy) Alessandro Di Pardo	22	(Italy) Vicenza	Free	End of loan	
29 January 2022	FW	(Italy) Marco Olivieri	22	(Italy) Lecce	Free	End of loan	
30 January 2022	MF	(Netherlands) Mohamed Ihattaren	19	(Italy) Sampdoria	Free	End of loan	
31 January 2022	GK	(Italy) Alessandro Siano	20	(Italy) Imolese	Free	To play with Juventus U23	
31 January 2022	DF	(Italy) Dario Del Fabro	26	(Belgium) Seraing	Free	End of loan	
31 January 2022	DF	(Romania) Radu Drăgușin	19	(Italy) Sampdoria	Free	End of loan	
31 January 2022	DF	(Italy) Federico Gatti	23	(Italy) Frosinone	€7.5M	€2.5M variables	
31 January 2022	DF	(Italy) Brando Moruzzi	18	(Italy) Sangiovannese	Free	On loan, to play with Juventus U19	
31 January 2022	DF	(Italy) Giuseppe Verduci	20	(Italy) Grosseto	Free	End of loan, to play with Juventus U23	
31 January 2022	MF	(Tunisia) Hamza Rafia	22	(Belgium) Standard Liège	Free	End of loan	

==== Other disposals ====
Date	Pos.	Player	Age	Moving to	Fee	Notes	Source
4 January 2022	DF	(Switzerland) Albian Hajdari	18	(Switzerland) Basel	Free	On loan until June 2022	
13 January 2022	DF	(Italy) Luca Coccolo	23	(Italy) Alessandria	Free	On loan until June 2022	
14 January 2022	FW	(Switzerland) Christopher Lungoyi	21	(Switzerland) St. Gallen	Free	On loan until June 2022	
21 January 2022	DF	(Italy) Alessandro Minelli	22	(Italy) Pro Vercelli	Free	On loan until June 2022 with option to buy	
29 January 2022	MF	(Italy) Alessandro Di Pardo	22	(Italy) Cosenza	Free	On loan until June 2022	
29 January 2022	FW	(Italy) Marco Olivieri	22	(Italy) Perugia	Free	On loan until June 2023 with option to buy for €3.5M	
30 January 2022	MF	(Netherlands) Mohamed Ihattaren	19	(Netherlands) Ajax	Free	On loan until December 2022 with option to buy for €2M	
31 January 2022	DF	(Italy) Francesco Coppola	16	(Italy) Pisa	Free	On loan until June 2022 with obligation to buy	
31 January 2022	DF	(Italy) Davide De Marino	21	(Italy) Pisa	Free	On loan until June 2022 with option to buy	
31 January 2022	DF	(Italy) Dario Del Fabro	26	(Italy) Cittadella	Free	On loan until June 2023	
31 January 2022	DF	(Romania) Radu Drăgușin	19	(Italy) Salernitana	Free	On loan until June 2022	
31 January 2022	DF	(Italy) Federico Gatti	23	(Italy) Frosinone	Free	On loan until June 2022	
31 January 2022	MF	(Tunisia) Hamza Rafia	22	(Italy) Cremonese	Free	On loan until June 2022	

== Pre-season and friendlies ==
Win Draw Loss Fixtures

24 July 2021 Friendly	Juventus	3–1	Cesena	Continassa, Turin
18:00 CEST (UTC+2)	De Winter 5', (yellow card) 8'; McKennie 34'; Soulé 66'	Report	Shpendi 36'	Stadium: Juventus Training Center; Attendance: About 400; Referee: Marco Ricci

31 July 2021 Trofeo Luigi Berlusconi	Monza	1–2	Juventus	Monza
21:00 CEST (UTC+2)	Caldirola (yellow card) 35'; D'Alessandro 87'	Report	Ranocchia 13'; Kulusevski 53'	Stadium: Stadio Brianteo; Attendance: About 1,000; Referee: Ivano Pezzuto

8 August 2021 Joan Gamper Trophy	Barcelona	3–0	Juventus	Barcelona
21:30 CEST (UTC+2)	Depay 3'; Braithwaite (yellow card) 35', (goal) 57'; Emerson (yellow card) 82'; Puig 90+2'	Report	McKennie (yellow card) 55'	Stadium: Johan Cruyff Stadium; Attendance: 2,924; Referee: César Soto Grado

14 August 2021 Friendly	Juventus	3–1	Atalanta	Turin
20:30 CEST (UTC+2)	Dybala 8'; Bernardeschi 39'; Morata 90+3'	Report	Muriel 18' (pen.); Djimsiti (yellow card) 57'	Stadium: Juventus Stadium; Attendance: 11,167; Referee: Rosario Abisso

19 August 2021 Friendly	Juventus	3–0	Juventus U23	Continassa, Turin
18:00 CEST (UTC+2)	Dybala 7'; Morata 26'; Ramsey 35'	Report		Stadium: Juventus Training Center; Attendance: About 400; Referee: Michele Giordano

9 October 2021 Friendly	Juventus	2–1	Alessandria	Continassa, Turin
11:00 CEST (UTC+2)	Maressa 40'; Chibozo 90+4'	Report	Corazza 90'	Stadium: Juventus Training Center; Attendance: About 400; Referee: Andrea Felis

14 October 2021 Friendly	Juventus	7–0	Chieri	Continassa, Turin
	Kean (x2); Soulé (x2); Kulusevski; Compagnon; Aké	Report		Stadium: Juventus Training Center; Attendance: About 200

13 November 2021 Friendly	Juventus	11–0	Pianese	Continassa, Turin
	Kean (x4); Kaio Jorge (x3); Zuelli (x2); Arthur; Compagnon	Report		Stadium: Juventus Training Center; Attendance: About 200

== Competitions ==
=== Overview ===
Competition	First match	Last match	Starting round	Final position	Record							
Competition	First match	Last match	Starting round	Final position	Pld	W	D	L	GF	GA	GD	Win %
Serie A	22 August 2021	21 May 2022	Matchday 1	4th	38	20	10	8	57	37	+20	52.63
Coppa Italia	18 January 2022	11 May 2022	Round of 16	Runners-up	5	4	0	1	11	6	+5	80.00
Supercoppa Italiana	12 January 2022		Final	Runners-up	1	0	0	1	1	2	−1	0.00
Champions League	14 September 2021	16 March 2022	Group stage	Round of 16	8	5	1	2	11	10	+1	62.50
Total					52	29	11	12	80	55	+25	55.77

Source: Competitions

=== Serie A ===
==== League table ====
Pos	Team	Pld	W	D	L	GF	GA	GD	Pts	Qualification or relegation
2	Inter Milan	38	25	9	4	84	32	+52	84	Qualification for the Champions League group stage
3	Napoli	38	24	7	7	74	31	+43	79	Qualification for the Champions League group stage
4	Juventus	38	20	10	8	57	37	+20	70	Qualification for the Champions League group stage
5	Lazio	38	18	10	10	77	58	+19	64	Qualification for the Europa League group stage (Note: Since the winners of the 2021–22 Coppa Italia, Inter Milan, qualified for the Champions League, the Europa League berth awarded to the Coppa Italia winners was passed to the sixth-placed team, and the Europa Conference League berth awarded to the sixth-placed team was passed to the seventh-placed team.)
6	Roma	38	18	9	11	59	43	+16	63	Qualification for the Europa League group stage

Source: Serie A
Rules for classification: 1) Points; 2) Head-to-head points; 3) Head-to-head goal difference; 4) Goal difference; 5) Goals scored; 6) Draw. (Note: Head-to-head record is used only after all the matches between the teams in question have been played)

==== Results summary ====
Overall								Home						Away					
Pld	W	D	L	GF	GA	GD	Pts	W	D	L	GF	GA	GD	W	D	L	GF	GA	GD
38	20	10	8	57	37	+20	70	10	5	4	25	14	+11	10	5	4	32	23	+9

Source: Serie A

==== Results by round ====
Round	1	2	3	4	5	6	7	8	9	10	11	12	13	14	15	16	17	18	19	20	21	22	23	24	25	26	27	28	29	30	31	32	33	34	35	36	37	38
Ground	A	H	A	H	A	H	A	H	A	H	A	H	A	H	A	H	A	A	H	H	A	H	A	H	A	H	A	H	A	H	H	A	H	A	H	A	H	A
Result	D	L	L	D	W	W	W	W	D	L	L	W	W	L	W	W	D	W	W	D	W	W	D	W	D	D	W	W	W	W	L	W	D	W	W	L	D	L
Position	10	12	16	18	12	10	7	7	6	7	9	8	8	7	7	5	7	7	5	5	5	5	5	4	4	4	4	4	4	4	4	4	4	4	4	4	4	4

Source: Serie A
A = Away; H = Home; W = Win; D = Draw; L = Loss

==== Matches ====
The league fixtures were announced on 14 July 2021.

22 August 2021 1	Udinese	2–2	Juventus	Udine
18:30 CEST (UTC+2)	Pereyra 51' (pen.); Walace (yellow card) 76'; Deulofeu 83'	Report	Dybala 3'; Cuadrado 23'; Szczęsny (yellow card) 50'; Kulusevski (yellow card) 88'; Ronaldo (yellow card) 90+5'	Stadium: Stadio Friuli; Attendance: 9,660 (Note: The total capacity of the stadium was established at 50% due to the COVID-19 pandemic in Italy.); Referee: Ivano Pezzuto

28 August 2021 2	Juventus	0–1	Empoli	Turin
20:45 CEST (UTC+2)	Bernardeschi (yellow card) 81'; Danilo (yellow card) 89'	Report	Mancuso 21'; Stojanović (yellow card) 32'; Cutrone (yellow card) 44'; Ismajli (yellow card) 56'	Stadium: Juventus Stadium; Attendance: 17,584; Referee: Davide Ghersini

11 September 2021 3	Napoli	2–1	Juventus	Naples
18:00 CEST (UTC+2)	Elmas (yellow card) 31'; Politano 57'; Koulibaly 85'; Lozano (yellow card) 88'	Report	Morata 10'; Locatelli (yellow card) 45'	Stadium: Stadio San Paolo; Attendance: 16,331; Referee: Massimiliano Irrati

19 September 2021 4	Juventus	1–1	Milan	Turin
20:45 CEST (UTC+2)	Morata 4'; Dybala (yellow card) 65'	Report	Tonali (yellow card) 65'; Rebić 76'	Stadium: Juventus Stadium; Attendance: 18,785; Referee: Daniele Doveri

22 September 2021 5	Spezia	2–3	Juventus	La Spezia
18:30 CEST (UTC+2)	Gyasi 33'; Antiste 49'; Nikolaou (yellow card) 85'; Nzola (yellow card) 90+4'	Report	Kean 28'; Chiesa 66'; De Ligt 72'; Morata (yellow card) 90+2'	Stadium: Stadio Alberto Picco; Attendance: 5,700; Referee: Gianluca Aureliano

26 September 2021 6	Juventus	3–2	Sampdoria	Turin
12:30 CEST (UTC+2)	Dybala 10'; Bonucci 43' (pen.), (yellow card) 84'; Bentancur (yellow card) 53'; Locatelli 57'; Cuadrado (yellow card) 66'; Kean (yellow card) 86'	Report	Thorsby (yellow card) 28'; Murru (yellow card) 41'; Yoshida 44'; Ekdal (yellow card) 45+3'; Candreva 83'	Stadium: Juventus Stadium; Attendance: 15,381; Referee: Giovanni Ayroldi

2 October 2021 7	Torino	0–1	Juventus	Turin
18:00 CEST (UTC+2)	Sanabria (yellow card) 56'; Lukić (yellow card) 62'; Mandragora (yellow card) 65'	Report	Chiellini (yellow card) 82'; Locatelli 86'	Stadium: Stadio Olimpico Grande Torino; Attendance: 12,073; Referee: Paolo Valeri

17 October 2021 8	Juventus	1–0	Roma	Turin
20:45 CEST (UTC+2)	Kean 16'; Szczęsny (yellow card) 42'; De Sciglio (yellow card) 49'; Danilo (yellow card) 87'	Report	Veretout (penalty missed) 44'; Abraham (yellow card) 45+3'; El Shaarawy (yellow card) 70'; Shomurodov (yellow card) 85'; Mancini (yellow card) 89'; Karsdorp (yellow card) 90+3'	Stadium: Juventus Stadium; Attendance: 20,239 (Note: The total capacity of the stadium was established at 75% due to the COVID-19 pandemic in Italy.); Referee: Daniele Orsato

24 October 2021 9	Internazionale	1–1	Juventus	Milan
20:45 CEST (UTC+2)	Džeko 17'; Barella (yellow card) 40'; Perišić (yellow card) 71'	Report	Alex Sandro (yellow card) 44'; Dybala 89' (pen.); Chiellini (yellow card) 90+5'	Stadium: San Siro; Attendance: 56,532; Referee: Maurizio Mariani

27 October 2021 10	Juventus	1–2	Sassuolo	Turin
18:30 CEST (UTC+2)	Cuadrado (yellow card) 63'; McKennie 76'	Report	Defrel (yellow card) 30'; Frattesi 44'; Berardi (yellow card) 58'; Rogério (yellow card) 61'; Traorè (yellow card) 72'; Müldür (yellow card) 86'; Lopez 90+5'	Stadium: Juventus Stadium; Attendance: 18,288; Referee: Juan Luca Sacchi

30 October 2021 11	Hellas Verona	2–1	Juventus	Verona
18:00 CEST (UTC+2)	Simeone 11', 14'; Lazović (yellow card) 27'; Casale (yellow card) 57'; Faraoni (yellow card) 61'; Günter (yellow card) 76'	Report	Danilo (yellow card) 29'; Arthur (yellow card) 61'; Morata (yellow card) 77'; McKennie 80'	Stadium: Stadio Marcantonio Bentegodi; Attendance: 22,314; Referee: Livio Marinelli

6 November 2021 12	Juventus	1–0	Fiorentina	Turin
18:00 CET (UTC+1)	Danilo (yellow card) 45+2'; Rugani (yellow card) 88'; Cuadrado 90+1'	Report	Martínez Quarta (yellow card) 26'; Milenković (yellow card) 66' (yellow-red card) 73'; Nastasić (yellow card) 82'	Stadium: Juventus Stadium; Attendance: 29,501; Referee: Simone Sozza

20 November 2021 13	Lazio	0–2	Juventus	Rome
18:00 CET (UTC+1)	Hysaj (yellow card) 43'; Reina (yellow card) 81'; Luis Alberto (yellow card) 82'	Report	Bonucci 23' (pen.), 83' (pen.); Cuadrado (yellow card) 28'	Stadium: Stadio Olimpico; Attendance: About 45,000; Referee: Marco Di Bello

27 November 2021 14	Juventus	0–1	Atalanta	Turin
18:00 CET (UTC+1)	Cuadrado (yellow card) 50'; Rabiot (yellow card) 66'; Bernardeschi (yellow card) 79'; Locatelli (yellow card) 88'	Report	Zapata 28'; Freuler (yellow card) 32'; Malinovskyi (yellow card) 37'; Zappacosta (yellow card) 43'; Demiral (yellow card) 70'; Djimsiti (yellow card) 85'	Stadium: Juventus Stadium; Attendance: 29,886; Referee: Giovanni Ayroldi

30 November 2021 15	Salernitana	0–2	Juventus	Salerno
20:45 CET (UTC+1)	Gagliolo (yellow card) 25'	Report	Dybala 21', (penalty missed) 90+5; Locatelli (yellow card) 60'; Morata 70'	Stadium: Stadio Arechi; Attendance: About 19,500; Referee: Francesco Fourneau

5 December 2021 16	Juventus	2–0	Genoa	Turin
20:45 CET (UTC+1)	Cuadrado 9'; Pellegrini (yellow card) 34'; Morata (yellow card) 72'; Kean (yellow card) 74'; Dybala 82'	Report	Cambiaso (yellow card) 50'	Stadium: Juventus Stadium; Attendance: 18,458; Referee: Daniele Chiffi

11 December 2021 17	Venezia	1–1	Juventus	Venice
18:00 CET (UTC+1)	Modolo (yellow card) 41'; Caldara (yellow card) 51'; Aramu 55'; Ampadu (yellow card) 62'; Kiyine (yellow card) 90'	Report	Pellegrini (yellow card) 16'; Morata 32'; Bernardeschi (yellow card) 62'	Stadium: Stadio Pier Luigi Penzo; Attendance: 8,350; Referee: Paolo Valeri

18 December 2021 18	Bologna	0–2	Juventus	Bologna
18:00 CET (UTC+1)	Domínguez (yellow card) 29'	Report	Morata 6'; McKennie (yellow card) 29'; Cuadrado 69'	Stadium: Stadio Renato Dall'Ara; Attendance: 22,394; Referee: Daniele Orsato

21 December 2021 19	Juventus	2–0	Cagliari	Turin
20:45 CET (UTC+1)	Kean 40'; Bernardeschi 83'	Report	Carboni (yellow card) 24'; Dalbert (yellow card) 35'; Pavoletti (yellow card) 85'	Stadium: Juventus Stadium; Attendance: 11,197; Referee: Federico Dionisi

6 January 2022 20	Juventus	1–1	Napoli	Turin
20:45 CET (UTC+1)	Alex Sandro (yellow card) 44'; Chiesa 54'; Dybala (yellow card) 90+7'	Report	Mertens 23'; Demme (yellow card) 87'	Stadium: Juventus Stadium; Attendance: 19,301; Referee: Simone Sozza

9 January 2022 21	Roma	3–4	Juventus	Rome
18:30 CET (UTC+1)	Abraham 11'; Mkhitaryan 48'; Veretout (yellow card) 50'; Ibañez (yellow card) 51'; Pellegrini 53', (penalty missed) 83; Cristante (yellow card) 76'	Report	Dybala 18'; Cuadrado (yellow card) 45+3'; De Ligt (yellow card) 52' (yellow-red card) 81'; Locatelli (yellow card) 65', (goal) 70'; Kulusevski 72'; De Sciglio 77'	Stadium: Stadio Olimpico; Attendance: 33,178; Referee: Davide Massa

15 January 2022 22	Juventus	2–0	Udinese	Turin
20:45 CET (UTC+1)	Dybala 19'; Arthur (yellow card) 23'; McKennie 79'	Report	Soppy (yellow card) 34'; Zeegelaar (yellow card) 77'	Stadium: Juventus Stadium; Attendance: 5,000; Referee: Antonio Giua

23 January 2022 23	Milan	0–0	Juventus	Milan
20:45 CET (UTC+1)	Leão (yellow card) 12'; Messias (yellow card) 42'	Report	Locatelli (yellow card) 9'; Kean (yellow card) 89'	Stadium: San Siro; Attendance: 5,000; Referee: Marco Di Bello (Note: Originally, the referee appointed for the match was Daniele Orsato.)

6 February 2022 24	Juventus	2–0	Hellas Verona	Turin
20:45 CET (UTC+1)	Vlahović 13'; Morata (yellow card) 58'; Zakaria 61'	Report	Depaoli (yellow card) 17'	Stadium: Juventus Stadium; Attendance: 17,016; Referee: Luca Massimi

13 February 2022 25	Atalanta	1–1	Juventus	Bergamo
20:45 CET (UTC+1)	Djimsiti (yellow card) 36'; Hateboer (yellow card) 36'; Malinovskyi 76'	Report	Danilo (yellow card) 38', (goal) 90+2'; Vlahović (yellow card) 42'; De Ligt (yellow card) 75'	Stadium: Gewiss Stadium; Attendance: 9,731; Referee: Maurizio Mariani

18 February 2022 26	Juventus	1–1	Torino	Turin
20:45 CET (UTC+1)	De Ligt 13'; Cuadrado (yellow card) 73'	Report	Belotti 62'; Lukić (yellow card) 82'; Mandragora (yellow card) 90'	Stadium: Juventus Stadium; Attendance: 20,132; Referee: Davide Massa

26 February 2022 27	Empoli	2–3	Juventus	Empoli
18:05 CET (UTC+1) (Note: The match, originally scheduled to kick-off at 18:00 CET (UTC+1), started five minutes late to underline the serious humanitarian situation in Ukraine due to the Russian invasion of Ukraine.)	Żurkowski 40'; Ismajli (yellow card) 51'; Parisi (yellow card) 73'; La Mantia 76'	Report	Kean 32'; Vlahović 45+2', 66'	Stadium: Stadio Carlo Castellani; Attendance: 11,890; Referee: Fabio Maresca

6 March 2022 28	Juventus	1–0	Spezia	Turin
18:00 CET (UTC+1)	Morata 21'; Vlahović (yellow card) 57'; Pellegrini (yellow card) 61'; Bernardeschi (yellow card) 68'	Report	Erlić (yellow card) 54'; Bourabia (yellow card) 90+4'	Stadium: Juventus Stadium; Attendance: 26,475; Referee: Francesco Fourneau

12 March 2022 29	Sampdoria	1–3	Juventus	Genoa
18:00 CET (UTC+1)	Candreva (penalty missed) 74'; Sabiri 84'	Report	Yoshida 23' (o.g.); Morata 34' (pen.), 88'; Rabiot (yellow card) 49'; Pellegrini (yellow card) 82'	Stadium: Stadio Luigi Ferraris; Attendance: 16,644; Referee: Paolo Valeri

20 March 2022 30	Juventus	2–0	Salernitana	Turin
15:00 CET (UTC+1)	Dybala 5'; Vlahović 29'; Pellegrini (yellow card) 40'; Danilo (yellow card) 82'; Rabiot (yellow card) 85'	Report	Coulibaly (yellow card) 24'; Verdi (yellow card) 68'	Stadium: Juventus Stadium; Attendance: 29,186; Referee: Giovanni Ayroldi

3 April 2022 31	Juventus	0–1	Internazionale	Turin
20:45 CEST (UTC+2)	Rabiot (yellow card) 15'; Locatelli (yellow card) 27'; Morata (yellow card) 45+1'; Cuadrado (yellow card) 45+4'	Report	Martínez (yellow card) 2'; Škriniar (yellow card) 45+4'; Çalhanoğlu 45+5' (pen.), (yellow card) 76'; Perišić (yellow card) 75'	Stadium: Juventus Stadium; Attendance: 40,093; Referee: Massimiliano Irrati

9 April 2022 32	Cagliari	1–2	Juventus	Cagliari
20:45 CEST (UTC+2)	João Pedro 10'; Lykogiannis (yellow card) 53'	Report	De Ligt 45'; Vlahović 75'	Stadium: Unipol Domus; Attendance: 13,437; Referee: Daniele Chiffi

16 April 2022 33	Juventus	1–1	Bologna	Turin
18:30 CEST (UTC+2)	Cuadrado (yellow card) 31'; Vlahović 90+5'	Report	Theate (yellow card) 13'; Svanberg (yellow card) 18'; Arnautović (yellow card) 41', (goal) 52'; Soumaoro (red card) 84'; Medel (yellow card) 84' (yellow-red card) 84'	Stadium: Juventus Stadium; Attendance: 36,107; Referee: Juan Luca Sacchi

25 April 2022 34	Sassuolo	1–2	Juventus	Reggio Emilia
20:45 CEST (UTC+2)	Raspadori 39'; Lopez (yellow card) 45+2'; Scamacca (yellow card) 50'	Report	Dybala 45'; De Sciglio (yellow card) 62'; Kean 88', (yellow card) 90'	Stadium: Mapei Stadium – Città del Tricolore; Attendance: 17,838; Referee: Fabio Maresca

1 May 2022 35	Juventus	2–1	Venezia	Turin
12:30 CEST (UTC+2)	Bonucci 7', 76'; Zakaria (yellow card) 25'; Pellegrini (yellow card) 45+1'; Alex Sandro (yellow card) 63'	Report	Kiyine (yellow card) 56'; Aramu (yellow card) 61', (goal) 71'; Haps (yellow card) 78'	Stadium: Juventus Stadium; Attendance: 39,203; Referee: Alessandro Prontera

6 May 2022 36	Genoa	2–1	Juventus	Genoa
21:00 CEST (UTC+2)	Melegoni (yellow card) 43'; Badelj (yellow card) 78'; Guðmundsson 87'; Criscito 90+6' (pen.)	Report	Dybala (yellow card) 29', (goal) 48'; Rugani (yellow card) 34'; Arthur (yellow card) 44'	Stadium: Stadio Luigi Ferraris; Attendance: 18,762; Referee: Simone Sozza

16 May 2022 37	Juventus	2–2	Lazio	Turin
20:45 CEST (UTC+2)	Vlahović 10'; Morata 36'; Bernardeschi (yellow card) 45+2'; Cuadrado (yellow card) 68'; Aké (yellow card) 80'	Report	Acerbi (yellow card) 41'; Alex Sandro 51' (o.g.); Milinković-Savić (yellow card) 83', (goal) 90+6'; Patric (yellow card) 90'	Stadium: Juventus Stadium; Attendance: 40,515; Referee: Giovanni Ayroldi

21 May 2022 38	Fiorentina	2–0	Juventus	Florence
20:45 CEST (UTC+2)	Igor (yellow card) 44'; Duncan 45+1'; Venuti (yellow card) 56'; Amrabat (yellow card) 70'; González 90+2' (pen.)	Report	Kean (yellow card) 44'; Rabiot (yellow card) 56'; De Ligt (yellow card) 84'	Stadium: Stadio Artemio Franchi; Attendance: 34,831; Referee: Daniele Chiffi

=== Coppa Italia ===
18 January 2022 Round of 16	Juventus	4–1	Sampdoria	Turin
21:00 CET (UTC+1)	Cuadrado 25'; Rugani 52'; Dybala 67'; Morata 77' (pen.); Alex Sandro (yellow card) 79'	Report	Conti 63'; Rincón (yellow card) 85'; Vieira (yellow card) 88'	Stadium: Juventus Stadium; Attendance: 5,000; Referee: Francesco Fourneau

10 February 2022 Quarter-finals	Juventus	2–1	Sassuolo	Turin
21:00 CET (UTC+1)	Dybala 3'; Ruan 88' (o.g.)	Report	Traorè 24', (yellow card) 58'; Matheus Henrique (yellow card) 68'	Stadium: Juventus Stadium; Attendance: 16,111; Referee: Livio Marinelli

2 March 2022 Semi-finals; First leg	Fiorentina	0–1	Juventus	Florence
21:00 CET (UTC+1)	Bonaventura (yellow card) 71'; Milenković (yellow card) 72'; Torreira (yellow card) 90'	Report	Pellegrini (yellow card) 57'; De Sciglio (yellow card) 79'; Venuti 90+1' (o.g.)	Stadium: Stadio Artemio Franchi; Attendance: 28,039; Referee: Marco Guida

20 April 2022 Semi-finals; Second leg	Juventus	2–0 (3–0 agg.)	Fiorentina	Turin
21:00 CEST (UTC+2)	Bernardeschi 32'; De Sciglio (yellow card) 45+2'; Danilo 90+4'	Report	Martínez Quarta (yellow card) 72'	Stadium: Juventus Stadium; Attendance: 32,109; Referee: Daniele Doveri

11 May 2022 Final	Juventus	2–4 (a.e.t.)	Internazionale	Rome
21:00 CEST (UTC+2)	Alex Sandro 50'; Vlahović 52'; Locatelli (yellow card) 90+2'	Report	Barella 7'; Brozović (yellow card) 55'; Çalhanoğlu 80' (pen.); Perišić 99' (pen.), 102'; Vidal (yellow card) 119'	Stadium: Stadio Olimpico; Attendance: 67,944; Referee: Paolo Valeri

=== Supercoppa Italiana ===
12 January 2022 Final	Internazionale	2–1 (a.e.t.)	Juventus	Milan
21:00 CET (UTC+1)	Martínez 35' (pen.); Džeko (yellow card) 60'; Correa (yellow card) 106'; Vidal (yellow card) 118'; Sánchez 120+1'	Report	McKennie 25'; Bernardeschi (yellow card) 43'; Dybala (yellow card) 105'; Rugani (yellow card) 109'	Stadium: San Siro; Attendance: 29,696; Referee: Daniele Doveri

=== UEFA Champions League ===
==== Group stage ====
The draw for the group stage was held on 26 August 2021.

Pos	Team	Pld	W	D	L	GF	GA	GD	Pts	Qualification	JUV	CHE	ZEN	MAL
1	(Italy) Juventus	6	5	0	1	10	6	+4	15	Advance to knockout phase	—	1–0	4–2	1–0
2	(England) Chelsea	6	4	1	1	13	4	+9	13	Advance to knockout phase	4–0	—	1–0	4–0
3	(Russia) Zenit Saint Petersburg	6	1	2	3	10	10	0	5	Transfer to Europa League	0–1	3–3	—	4–0
4	(Sweden) Malmö FF	6	0	1	5	1	14	−13	1		0–3	0–1	1–1	—

Source: UEFA
Rules for classification: Group stage tiebreakers

14 September 2021 1	Malmö FF (Sweden)	0–3	(Italy) Juventus	Malmö, Sweden
21:00 CEST (UTC+02:00)	Brorsson (yellow card) 39'; Nielsen (yellow card) 43'	Report	Alex Sandro 23'; Dybala 45' (pen.); Morata 45+1'; De Ligt (yellow card) 58'	Stadium: Stadion; Attendance: 5,832; Referee: Artur Soares Dias (Portugal)

29 September 2021 2	Juventus (Italy)	1–0	(England) Chelsea	Turin, Italy
21:00 CEST (UTC+02:00)	Chiesa 46'; Cuadrado (yellow card) 89'	Report	Alonso (yellow card) 18'; Ziyech (yellow card) 61'; Rüdiger (yellow card) 65'	Stadium: Juventus Stadium; Attendance: 19,934; Referee: Jesús Gil Manzano (Spain)

20 October 2021 3	Zenit Saint Petersburg (Russia)	0–1	(Italy) Juventus	Saint Petersburg, Russia
22:00 MSK (UTC+03:00)	Barrios (yellow card) 30'; Karavayev (yellow card) 46'	Report	Arthur (yellow card) 60'; Kulusevski 86'; Ramsey (yellow card) 90+4'	Stadium: Krestovsky Stadium; Attendance: 18,717; Referee: Sandro Schärer (Switzerland)

2 November 2021 4	Juventus (Italy)	4–2	(Russia) Zenit Saint Petersburg	Turin, Italy
21:00 CET (UTC+01:00)	Dybala 11', 58' (pen.); Locatelli (yellow card) 68'; Chiesa 74'; Morata 82'; Kulusevski (yellow card) 89'	Report	Bonucci 26' (o.g.); Lovren (yellow card) 54'; Azmoun 90+2'	Stadium: Juventus Stadium; Attendance: 20,053; Referee: Alejandro Hernández Hernández (Spain)

23 November 2021 5	Chelsea (England)	4–0	(Italy) Juventus	London, England
20:00 GMT (UTC±00:00)	Chalobah 25'; James 55'; Hudson-Odoi 58'; Werner 90+5'	Report	Cuadrado (yellow card) 23'	Stadium: Stamford Bridge; Attendance: 39,513; Referee: Srđan Jovanović (Serbia)

8 December 2021 6	Juventus (Italy)	1–0	(Sweden) Malmö FF	Turin, Italy
18:45 CET (UTC+01:00)	Kean 18'; Rabiot (yellow card) 90'	Report	Čolak (yellow card) 49'; Innocent (yellow card) 68'; Peña (yellow card) 80'	Stadium: Juventus Stadium; Attendance: 17,501; Referee: Irfan Peljto (Bosnia and Herzegovina)

==== Knockout phase ====
===== Round of 16 =====
The draw for the round of 16 was held on 13 December 2021.

22 February 2022 First leg	Villarreal (Spain)	1–1	(Italy) Juventus	Villarreal, Spain
21:00 CET (UTC+01:00)	Parejo 66'; Rulli (yellow card) 73'	Report	Vlahović 1'; Rabiot (yellow card) 73'	Stadium: Estadio de la Cerámica; Attendance: 17,686; Referee: Daniel Siebert (Germany)

16 March 2022 Second leg	Juventus (Italy)	0–3 (1–4 agg.)	(Spain) Villarreal	Turin, Italy
21:00 CET (UTC+01:00)	De Ligt (yellow card) 90'	Report	Gerard 78' (pen.); Torres 85'; Danjuma 90+2' (pen.)	Stadium: Juventus Stadium; Attendance: 30,385; Referee: Szymon Marciniak (Poland)

== Statistics ==
=== Appearances and goals ===
No.	Pos	Nat	Player	Total		Serie A		Coppa Italia		Supercoppa Italiana		Champions League	
No.	Pos	Nat	Player	Apps	Goals	Apps	Goals	Apps	Goals	Apps	Goals	Apps	Goals
Goalkeepers
1	GK	(Poland) POL	Wojciech Szczęsny	40	0	33	0	0	0	0	0	7	0
23	GK	(Italy) ITA	Carlo Pinsoglio	1	0	0+1	0	0	0	0	0	0	0
36	GK	(Italy) ITA	Mattia Perin	12	0	5	0	5	0	1	0	1	0
Defenders
2	DF	(Italy) ITA	Mattia De Sciglio	29	1	13+7	1	4	0	1	0	3+1	0
3	DF	(Italy) ITA	Giorgio Chiellini	26	0	16+5	0	1+2	0	1	0	0+1	0
4	DF	(Netherlands) NED	Matthijs de Ligt	42	3	29+2	3	4	0	0	0	7	0
6	DF	(Brazil) BRA	Danilo	31	2	22	1	4	1	0	0	5	0
11	DF	(Colombia) COL	Juan Cuadrado	45	5	28+5	4	3+2	1	0	0	5+2	0
12	DF	(Brazil) BRA	Alex Sandro	40	2	17+11	0	4	1	1	0	7	1
17	DF	(Italy) ITA	Luca Pellegrini	21	0	15+3	0	1+1	0	0	0	0+1	0
19	DF	(Italy) ITA	Leonardo Bonucci	34	5	22+2	5	2+1	0	0	0	6+1	0
24	DF	(Italy) ITA	Daniele Rugani	18	1	9+3	0	1	1	1	0	2+2	0
45	DF	(Belgium) BEL	Koni De Winter	2	0	0	0	0	0	0	0	1+1	0
Midfielders
5	MF	(Brazil) BRA	Arthur	31	0	11+9	0	3+1	0	0+1	0	2+4	0
14	MF	(United States) USA	Weston McKennie	29	4	15+6	3	1	0	1	1	4+2	0
20	MF	(Italy) ITA	Federico Bernardeschi	36	2	16+12	1	2	1	1	0	4+1	0
22	MF	(Italy) ITA	Federico Chiesa	18	4	11+3	2	0	0	0	0	4	2
25	MF	(France) FRA	Adrien Rabiot	45	0	28+4	0	4+1	0	1	0	6+1	0
27	MF	(Italy) ITA	Manuel Locatelli	43	3	23+8	3	2+2	0	1	0	7	0
28	MF	(Switzerland) SUI	Denis Zakaria	13	1	6+3	1	3	0	0	0	0+1	0
47	MF	(Italy) ITA	Fabio Miretti	7	0	4+2	0	0	0	0	0	0+1	0
56	MF	(Norway) NOR	Martin Palumbo	1	0	0+1	0	0	0	0	0	0	0
Forwards
7	FW	(Serbia) SRB	Dušan Vlahović	21	9	12+3	7	4	1	0	0	2	1
9	FW	(Spain) ESP	Álvaro Morata	48	12	26+9	9	2+3	1	1	0	6+1	2
10	FW	(Argentina) ARG	Paulo Dybala	39	15	26+3	10	2+2	2	0+1	0	3+2	3
18	FW	(Italy) ITA	Moise Kean	42	6	12+20	5	1+2	0	0+1	0	1+5	1
21	FW	(Brazil) BRA	Kaio Jorge	11	0	0+9	0	0+2	0	0	0	0	0
38	FW	(France) FRA	Marley Aké	6	0	0+4	0	1+1	0	0	0	0	0
43	FW	(Italy) ITA	Marco Da Graca	1	0	0	0	0	0	0	0	0+1	0
46	FW	(Argentina) ARG	Matías Soulé	2	0	0+2	0	0	0	0	0	0	0
Players transferred during the season
7	FW	(Portugal) POR	Cristiano Ronaldo	1	0	0+1	0	0	0	0	0	0	0
8	MF	(Wales) WAL	Aaron Ramsey	5	0	1+2	0	0	0	0	0	0+2	0
30	MF	(Uruguay) URU	Rodrigo Bentancur	26	0	13+6	0	0+1	0	0+1	0	5	0
44	MF	(Sweden) SWE	Dejan Kulusevski	27	2	5+15	1	1	0	1	0	0+5	1

Source: Competitions

Last updated: 21 May 2022

=== Goalscorers ===
Rank	No.	Pos.	Player	Serie A	Coppa Italia	Supercoppa	Champions League	Total
1	10	FW	(Argentina) Paulo Dybala	10	2	0	3	15
2	9	FW	(Spain) Álvaro Morata	9	1	0	2	12
3	7	FW	(Serbia) Dušan Vlahović	7	1	0	1	9
4	18	FW	(Italy) Moise Kean	5	0	0	1	6
5	11	DF	(Colombia) Juan Cuadrado	4	1	0	0	5
5	19	DF	(Italy) Leonardo Bonucci	5	0	0	0	5
7	14	MF	(United States) Weston McKennie	3	0	1	0	4
7	22	MF	(Italy) Federico Chiesa	2	0	0	2	4
9	4	DF	(Netherlands) Matthijs de Ligt	3	0	0	0	3
9	27	MF	(Italy) Manuel Locatelli	3	0	0	0	3
11	6	DF	(Brazil) Danilo	1	1	0	0	2
11	12	DF	(Brazil) Alex Sandro	0	1	0	1	2
11	20	MF	(Italy) Federico Bernardeschi	1	1	0	0	2
11	44	MF	(Sweden) Dejan Kulusevski	1	0	0	1	2
14	2	DF	(Italy) Mattia De Sciglio	1	0	0	0	1
14	24	DF	(Italy) Daniele Rugani	0	1	0	0	1
14	28	MF	(Switzerland) Denis Zakaria	1	0	0	0	1
Own goals				1	2	0	0	3
Totals				57	11	1	11	80

Last updated: 21 May 2022

== See also ==
- 2021–22 Juventus F.C. Under-23 season
- 2021–22 Juventus F.C. (women) season
