= Adrien Rabiot =

French footballer (born 1995)

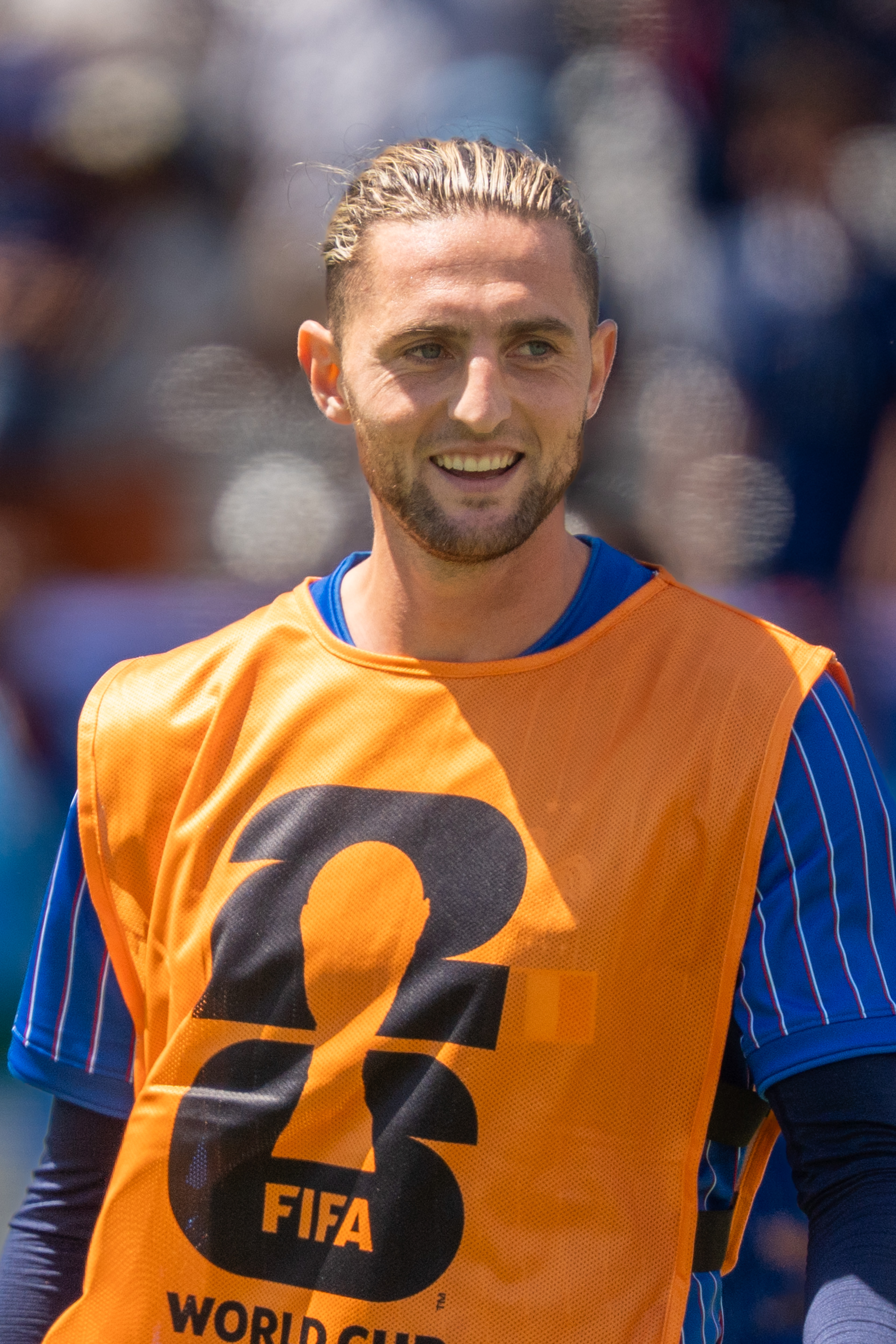
- Rabiot with France in 2026

Personal information
- Full name: Adrien Thibault Marie Rabiot
- Date of birth: 3 April 1995 (age 31)
- Place of birth: Saint-Maurice, Val-de-Marne, France
- Height: 1.91 m (6 ft 3 in)
- Position: Midfielder

Team information
- Current team: AC Milan
- Number: 12

Youth career
- 2001–2003: Créteil
- 2003–2004: Alfortville
- 2004–2008: Créteil
- 2008: Manchester City
- 2009–2010: Pau
- 2009–2010: Pôle Espoirs Castelmaurou
- 2010–2012: Paris Saint-Germain

Senior career*
Years	Team	Apps	(Gls)
2012–2014	Paris Saint-Germain II	9	(0)
2012–2019	Paris Saint-Germain	150	(13)
2013	→ Toulouse II (loan)	2	(1)
2013	→ Toulouse (loan)	13	(1)
2019–2024	Juventus	157	(18)
2024–2025	Marseille	30	(9)
2025–	AC Milan	39	(11)

International career^{‡}
2010	France U16	2	(0)
2011–2012	France U17	5	(0)
2012	France U18	1	(1)
2012–2013	France U19	20	(4)
2014	France U20	6	(0)
2013–2016	France U21	19	(2)
2016–	France	71	(7)
Medal record
Representing France
Men's football
FIFA World Cup
Runner-up	2022 Qatar
UEFA European Championship
Third place	UEFA Euro 2024
UEFA Nations League
Winner	2021 Italy
Third place	2025 Germany
UEFA European Under-19 Championship
Runner-up	2013 Lithuania
- * Club domestic league appearances and goals as of 21:07, 22 November 2026 (UTC) ‡ National team caps and goals as of 22:22, 15 November 2026 (UTC)

Adrien Thibault Marie Rabiot (French pronunciation: [adʁijɛ̃ tibo maʁi ʁabjo]; born 3 April 1995) is a French professional footballer who plays as a midfielder for Serie A club AC Milan and the France national team.

Rabiot spent most of his early career with Paris Saint-Germain, making his debut with the first team in 2012 and winning eighteen major honours, including five Ligue 1 titles and a domestic treble in the 2015–16 and 2017–18 seasons. In 2019, Rabiot signed for Juventus on a free transfer, winning the Serie A title during his first season with the club and the Coppa Italia in his second and fifth. After a season at Marseille, he signed for AC Milan in 2025.

Rabiot was capped 53 times for France at youth level, and made his debut for the senior team in 2016. He took part in UEFA Euro 2020, the 2022 FIFA World Cup (reaching the final), Euro 2024 and the 2026 World Cup.

== Club career ==
=== Paris Saint-Germain ===
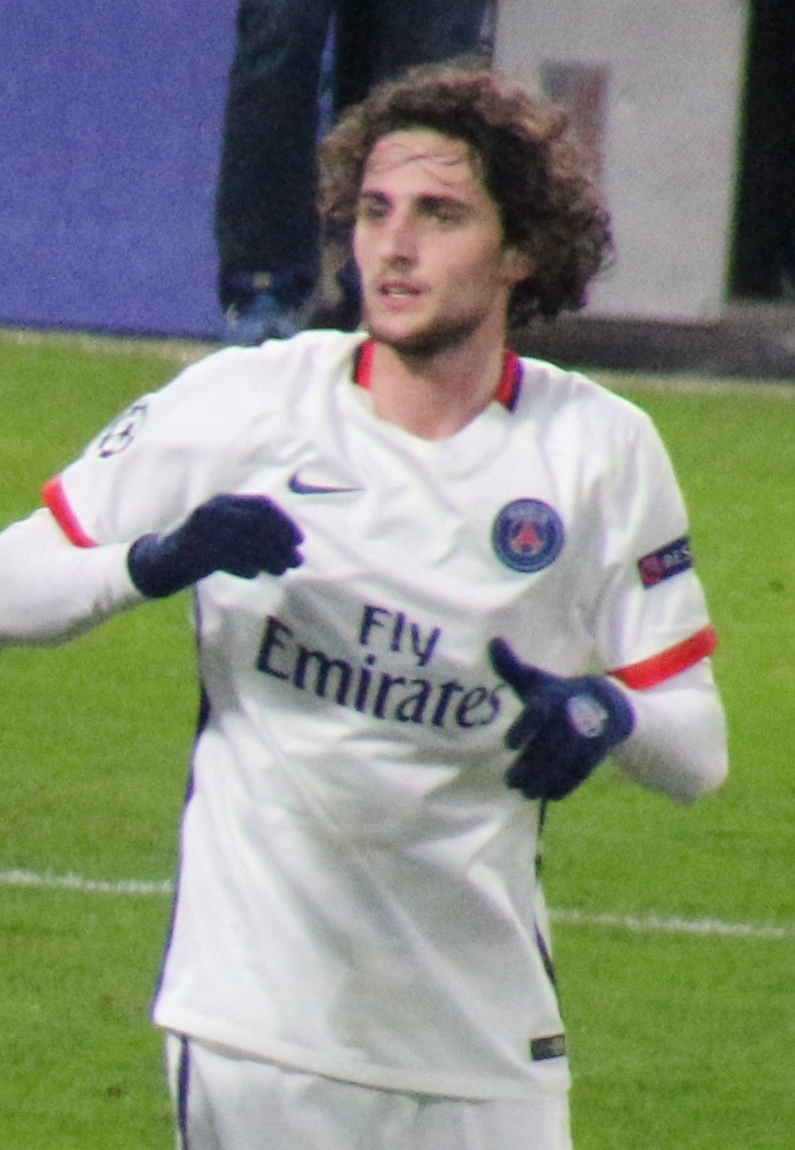
Rabiot playing for Paris Saint-Germain in 2016

Rabiot was born in Saint-Maurice, Val-de-Marne. He played youth football for several teams, including two spells at Créteil and a few months at Manchester City. On 2 July 2012, after excelling at the Camp des Loges, he signed his first professional contract agreeing to a three-year deal with Paris Saint-Germain.

Rabiot was promoted to the senior team by manager Carlo Ancelotti ahead of the 2012–13 season. In the club's pre-season he started in the penalty shootout defeat to Barcelona, and, on 26 August, played his first game in Ligue 1, a 0–0 home draw against Bordeaux.

Rabiot made his UEFA Champions League debut on 6 November 2012, playing during injury time in a 4–0 group stage home win over Dinamo Zagreb. In January of the following year he was loaned to fellow league side Toulouse, scoring his first professional goal on 9 March 2013 which was the game's only goal at Brest, from 25 yards.

Returning to PSG, Rabiot contributed with 46 matches and six goals combined as the team won back-to-back domestic leagues from 2013 to 2015, but seemed to be on the verge of leaving the club as his mother Véronique acted as his main advisor during negotiations for a better contract. He started the 2015–16 campaign by getting sent off for two yellow cards after only 29 minutes, in the opening fixture against Lille (eventual away 1–0 win).

Rabiot scored his first goal in European competition on 25 November 2015 to open a 5–0 Champions League group win at Malmö, and repeated the feat the following 9 March in a 2–1 victory over Chelsea at Stamford Bridge, sending PSG into the quarter-finals (4–2 on aggregate). Four days later, he scored in a 9–0 routing at bottom team Troyes that sealed the league title with eight matches remaining.

On 23 April 2016, Rabiot was sent off in the final of the Coupe de la Ligue, a 2–1 win over Lille. The following two seasons combined, he scored four times from 60 appearances and conquered the national championship in 2017–18. In late October 2018, both Rabiot and Kylian Mbappé were dropped from the starting XI by newly appointed manager Thomas Tuchel after they arrived late to a pre-match meeting. The following January, after refusing to renew his contract and failing to appear for the first team since the previous month, the former midfielder was forced to train with the reserves.

On 14 March 2019, Rabiot was suspended by PSG until the end of the month for going to a nightclub after a 3–1 loss to Manchester United in the Champions League round of 16 which knocked them out of the competition, and for liking an Instagram post by Patrice Evra celebrating United's win.

=== Juventus ===
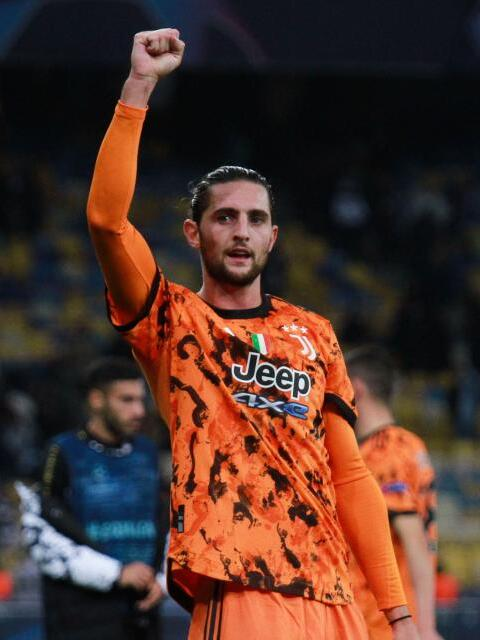
Rabiot playing for Juventus in 2020

On 1 July 2019, Rabiot signed for Italian champions Juventus on a free transfer. He made his league debut for the club on 24 August, in the team's opening match of the 2019–20 Serie A season, coming on as a second-half substitute for Sami Khedira, in a 1–0 away win over Parma. He scored his first goal for the club on 7 July 2020 – the opening goal in a 4–2 away loss to Milan in Serie A – with a "spectacular finish from the edge of the box – after running with the ball from his own half."

On 9 March 2021, he scored his first Champions League goal with Juventus in a 3–2 win after extra-time against Porto in the 2020–21 UEFA Champions League round of 16; however, Juventus were eliminated on away goals. On 27 June 2023, he signed a one-year contract extension with the club until 2024. On 30 December, he scored the winning goal in a 1–0 victory over Roma.

He left Juventus in July 2024.

=== Marseille ===
On 17 September 2024, Rabiot signed for French side Marseille on a free transfer.

On 19 August 2025, the club announced that Rabiot, alongside teammate Jonathan Rowe, had been placed on the transfer list due to "unacceptable behavior in the locker room" following Marseille's 1–0 loss away to Rennes. Their altercation was described as an "English pub fight" by manager Roberto De Zerbi, and as "extremely violent" by president Pablo Longoria.

=== AC Milan ===
On 1 September 2025, Rabiot returned to Serie A, joining AC Milan on a three-year deal. He scored his first goal for the club in an away game against Torino on 8 December and made the score 2–1 in an eventual 2–3 comeback win.

== International career ==
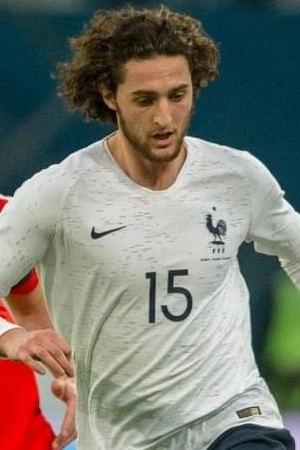
Rabiot playing for France in 2018

Rabiot was a member of the France U19 side that reached the final of the 2013 UEFA European Under-19 Championship in Lithuania, losing out to Serbia.

On 13 August 2013, aged just 18, Rabiot made his first appearance for the French under-21 team, starting in a 0–0 friendly draw with Germany in Freiburg. He was on standby for the full side's UEFA Euro 2016 squad, but did not make the final cut.

Rabiot made his senior debut for France on 15 November 2016 against Ivory Coast, starting and being replaced by Thomas Lemar after 78 minutes of the 0–0 friendly home draw, due to a hamstring injury. On 17 May 2018, he was put on the reserve list by manager Didier Deschamps for the 2018 FIFA World Cup squad. However, he controversially refused to be put on the standby list, emailing the coach and saying he would not "be able to follow the training programme". French Football Federation president Noël Le Graët commented: "He made a bad decision. He penalises himself and sanctions himself alone."

On 18 May 2021, Rabiot was included in France's 26-man squad for UEFA Euro 2020. He came on as an emergency left-back in the final group game against Portugal due to injuries to Lucas Hernández and Lucas Digne, and retained a starting role as a left wing-back in an untested 3–5–2 formation against Switzerland in the last 16; his side lost in a penalty shoot-out after a 3–3 draw.

Rabiot playing for France at the 2026 FIFA World Cup

On 13 November, Rabiot scored his first international goal in an 8–0 home win over Kazakhstan, which allowed France to qualify for the 2022 FIFA World Cup.

On 22 November 2022, Rabiot scored France's first goal of the 2022 World Cup in a 4–1 win group stage against Australia. He started in the final against Argentina, but was substituted off in extra time; France were defeated 4–2 on penalties following a 3–3 draw.

Rabiot was selected to play in UEFA Euro 2024, playing in five matches. Before France's semi-final against eventual champions Spain, Rabiot sparked controversy over his comments regarding highly-regarded Spanish youngster Lamine Yamal by saying, "...to play the final of a Euro, he'll need to show much more than he has until now." Yamal scored a goal in the match, helping Spain win 2–1 against France and celebrated by yelling "Speak now!" to the camera.

On 14 May 2026, Rabiot was selected in the 26-man squad for the 2026 FIFA World Cup. Rabiot and the rest of the squad went on to finish in fourth place after losing to England in the bronze medal match.

== Style of play ==
He is a complete player, I have rarely seen someone so strong both physically and technically.

— Andrea Pirlo

He is a left-footed midfielder who combines good technique with impressive physical qualities. Rabiot was regarded as a promising player in his youth. He is known for being mobile, hard-working, quick in possession, and for his ability to make late attacking runs off the ball into the penalty box, courtesy of his skilled movement; he is also a composed passer, who possesses good link-up play and dribbling skills in close spaces, which enables him to create chances for teammates. A modern, well-rounded, and versatile player, with good defensive skills, he is also known for being capable of playing in several different midfield positions, including in a deep, creative holding role as a number 6 in front of the defence (however not his favored role), as a box-to-box midfielder, on the right flank, and even as an advanced midfield playmaker, although he usually plays as a left–sided offensive-minded central midfielder, known as the mezzala role in Italian football jargon, which is his preferred position. His Juventus manager Massimiliano Allegri has also deployed him as a left winger on occasion. Despite his talent and ability, however, he has come under criticism in the media over his behaviour off the pitch, and has also been accused in the media of lacking professionalism, as well as having a poor attitude and a difficult character, which has led him to have conflicts with several of his managers. In addition to his usual roles in midfield, he has also been used as a makeshift full-back or wing-back on occasion.

== Career statistics ==
=== Club ===
As of match played 22 November 2026

Appearances and goals by club, season and competition
Club	Season	League			National cup (Note: Includes Coupe de France, Coppa Italia)		League cup (Note: Includes Coupe de la Ligue)		Europe		Other		Total	
Club	Season	Division	Apps	Goals	Apps	Goals	Apps	Goals	Apps	Goals	Apps	Goals	Apps	Goals
Paris Saint-Germain II	2011–12	CFA	4	0	—		—		—		—		4	0
Paris Saint-Germain II	2012–13	CFA	1	0	—		—		—		—		1	0
Paris Saint-Germain II	2014–15	CFA	4	0	—		—		—		—		4	0
Paris Saint-Germain II	Total		9	0	—		—		—		—		9	0
Paris Saint-Germain	2012–13	Ligue 1	6	0	1	0	1	0	1 (Note: Appearance(s) in UEFA Champions League)	0	—		9	0
Paris Saint-Germain	2013–14	Ligue 1	25	2	1	0	2	1	6	0	0	0	34	3
Paris Saint-Germain	2014–15	Ligue 1	21	4	5	0	3	0	4	0	0	0	33	4
Paris Saint-Germain	2015–16	Ligue 1	24	1	6	1	4	1	7	3	1 (Note: Appearance in Trophée des Champions)	0	42	6
Paris Saint-Germain	2016–17	Ligue 1	27	3	4	1	3	0	5	0	0	0	39	4
Paris Saint-Germain	2017–18	Ligue 1	33	1	5	1	3	1	8	1	1	1	50	5
Paris Saint-Germain	2018–19	Ligue 1	14	2	0	0	0	0	5	0	1	0	20	2
Paris Saint-Germain	Total		150	13	22	3	16	3	36	4	3	1	227	24
Toulouse II (loan)	2012–13	CFA 2	2	1	—		—		—		—		2	1
Toulouse (loan)	2012–13	Ligue 1	13	1	—		—		—		—		13	1
Juventus	2019–20	Serie A	28	1	4	0	—		5	0	0	0	37	1
Juventus	2020–21	Serie A	34	4	5	0	—		7	1	1 (Note: Appearance in Supercoppa Italiana)	0	47	5
Juventus	2021–22	Serie A	32	0	5	0	—		7	0	1	0	45	0
Juventus	2022–23	Serie A	32	8	3	0	—		13 (Note: Five appearances and two goals in UEFA Champions League, eight appearances and one goal in UEFA Europa League)	3	—		48	11
Juventus	2023–24	Serie A	31	5	4	0	—		—		—		35	5
Juventus	Total		157	18	21	0	—		32	4	2	0	212	22
Marseille	2024–25	Ligue 1	29	9	2	1	—		—		—		31	10
Marseille	2025–26	Ligue 1	1	0	—		—		—		—		1	0
Marseille	Total		30	9	2	1	—		—		—		32	10
AC Milan	2025–26	Serie A	29	6	2	0	—		—		1	0	32	6
AC Milan	2026–27	Serie A	10	5	0	0	—		4 (Note: Appearance(s) in UEFA Europa League)	0	—		14	5
AC Milan	Total		39	11	2	0	—		4	0	1	0	46	11
Career total			400	53	47	4	16	3	72	8	6	1	541	69

=== International ===
As of match played 15 November 2026

Appearances and goals by national team and year
National team	Year	Apps	Goals
France	2016	1	0
France	2017	4	0
France	2018	1	0
France	2020	5	0
France	2021	13	1
France	2022	11	2
France	2023	7	1
France	2024	8	2
France	2025	6	1
France	2026	15	0
Total		71	7

As of match played 18 July 2026
France score listed first, score column indicates score after each Rabiot goal

List of international goals scored by Adrien Rabiot
No.	Date	Venue	Cap	Opponent	Score	Result	Competition	Ref.
1	13 November 2021	Parc des Princes, Paris, France	23	Kazakhstan	6–0	8–0	2022 FIFA World Cup qualification	
2	6 June 2022	Stadion Poljud, Split, Croatia	28	Croatia	1–0	1–1	2022–23 UEFA Nations League A	
3	22 November 2022	Al Janoub Stadium, Al Wakrah, Qatar	30	Australia	1–1	4–1	2022 FIFA World Cup	
4	18 November 2023	Allianz Riviera, Nice, France	41	Gibraltar	8–0	14–0	UEFA Euro 2024 qualifying	
5	17 November 2024	San Siro, Milan, Italy	50	Italy	1–0	3–1	2024–25 UEFA Nations League A	
6	17 November 2024	San Siro, Milan, Italy	50	Italy	3–1	3–1	2024–25 UEFA Nations League A	
7	10 October 2025	Parc des Princes, Paris, France	56	Azerbaijan	2–0	3–0	2026 FIFA World Cup qualification	

== Honours ==
Paris Saint-Germain

- Ligue 1: 2013–14, 2014–15, 2015–16, 2017–18, 2018–19
- Coupe de France: 2014–15, 2015–16, 2016–17, 2017–18
- Coupe de la Ligue: 2013–14, 2014–15, 2015–16, 2016–17, 2017–18
- Trophée des Champions: 2015, 2016, 2017, 2018

Juventus

- Serie A: 2019–20
- Coppa Italia: 2020–21, 2023–24
- Supercoppa Italiana: 2020

France U19

- UEFA European Under-19 Championship runner-up: 2013

France

- UEFA Nations League: 2020–21; third place: 2024–25
- FIFA World Cup runner-up: 2022

Individual

- UEFA European Under-19 Championship Team of the Tournament: 2013
- EA Sports Serie A Team of the Season: 2022–23, 2025–26
- Marseille Player of the Season: 2024–25
