= Mattia Del Favero =

Italian footballer (born 1998)

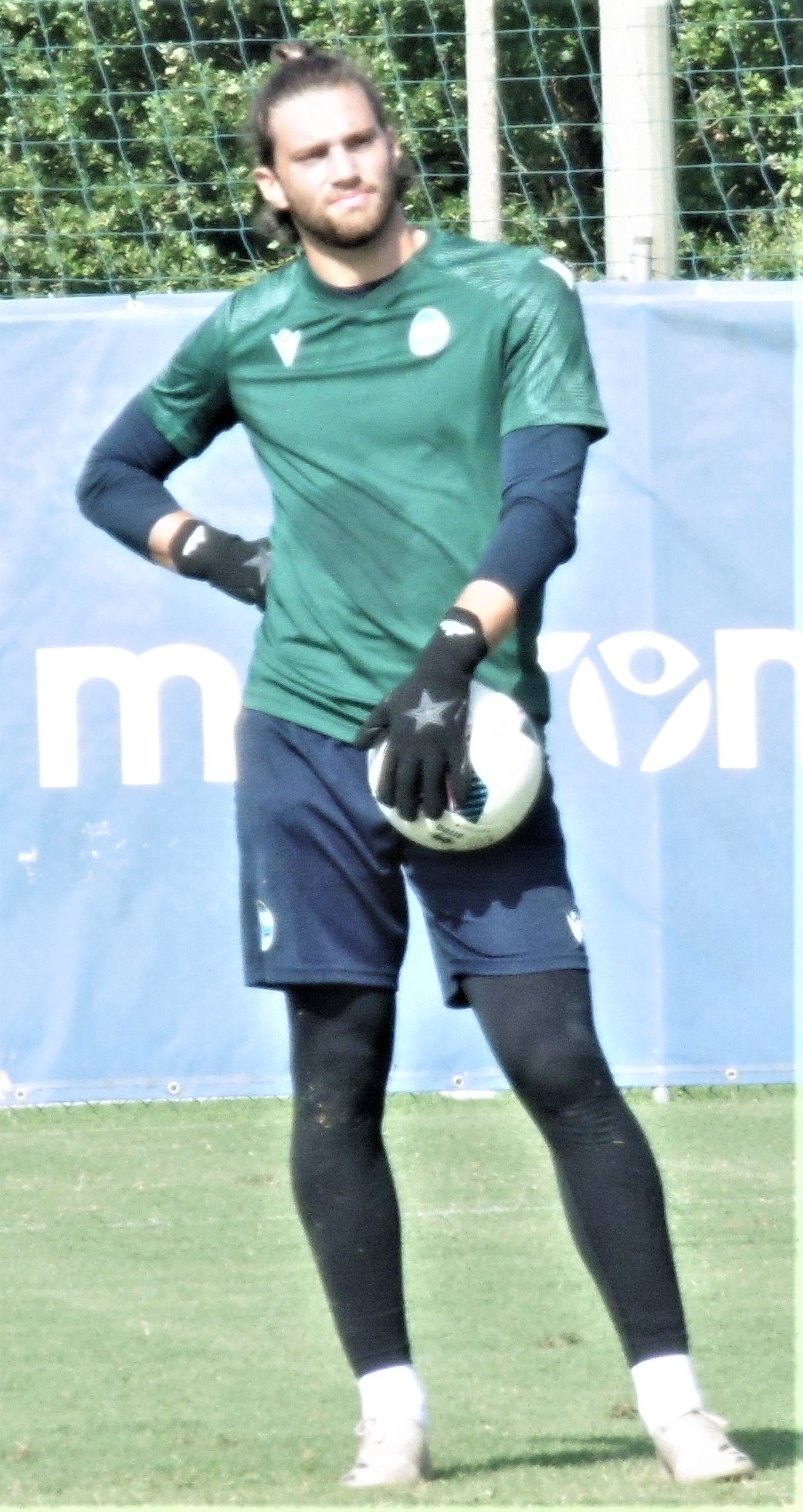

Personal information
- Date of birth: 5 June 1998 (age 28)
- Place of birth: Florence, Italy
- Height: 1.93 m (6 ft 4 in)
- Position: Goalkeeper

Team information
- Current team: Pro Vercelli
- Number: 77

Youth career
- –2014: Prato
- 2013–2014: → Juventus (loan)
- 2014–2018: Juventus

Senior career*
Years	Team	Apps	(Gls)
2018–2023	Juventus	0	(0)
2018–2019	→ Juventus U23 (res.)	23	(0)
2019–2020	→ Piacenza (loan)	16	(0)
2020–2021	→ Pescara (loan)	0	(0)
2021–2022	→ Cosenza (loan)	0	(0)
2022–2023	→ Pro Patria (loan)	35	(0)
2023–2024	SPAL	7	(0)
2024–2025	Taranto	19	(0)
2025	Osijek	0	(0)
2026–	Pro Vercelli	5	(0)

International career^{‡}
2013–2014	Italy U16	6	(0)
2015–2016	Italy U18	6	(0)
2016–2017	Italy U19	10	(0)
2017–2018	Italy U20	1	(0)
2020	Italy U21	1	(0)
- * Club domestic league appearances and goals as of 30 April 2026 ‡ National team caps and goals as of 3 September 2020

Mattia Del Favero (born 5 June 1998) is an Italian professional footballer who plays as a goalkeeper for Serie C Group A club Pro Vercelli.

== Club career ==
He first appeared on the bench for Juventus as the third goalkeeper on 30 May 2015 in a game against Verona. He appeared several more times on the bench during the 2016–17 and 2017–18 seasons, but did not make any game appearances for the squad.

He made his Serie C debut for Juventus U23 on 16 September 2018 in a game against Alessandria.

On 22 July 2019, he joined Serie C club Piacenza on loan.

On 10 September 2020 he joined Pescara on loan.

On 6 August 2021, he joined Cosenza on loan. Del Favero, due to an injury at his shoulder did not play any match.

On 11 January 2022, Juventus announced the termination of the loan one year early.

On 7 July 2022, he was loaned to Pro Patria.

On 1 August 2023, Del Favero signed a two-year contract with SPAL.

In August 2024, Del Favero signed for Taranto on a permanent deal.

On 4 February 2025, Del Favero joined Osijek in Croatia.

== International career ==
He made his debut with the Italy U21 on 3 September 2020, in a friendly match won 2–1 against Slovenia.

== Honours ==
Juventus

- Supercoppa Italiana: 2018

== Career statistics ==
As of match played 30 September 2020

Appearances and goals by club, season and competition
Club	Season	League			Coppa Italia		Other		Total	
Club	Season	Division	Apps	Goals	Apps	Goals	Apps	Goals	Apps	Goals
Juventus	2018–19	Serie A	0	0	0	0	0	0	0	0
Juventus	2021–22	Serie A	0	0	0	0	0	0	0	0
Juventus	Total		0	0	0	0	0	0	0	0
Juventus U23 (res.)	2018–19	Serie C	23	0	—		0	0	23	0
Piacenza (loan)	2019–20	Serie C	16	0	2	0	0	0	18	0
Pescara (loan)	2020–21	Serie B	0	0	1	0	0	0	1	0
Cosenza (loan)	2021–22	Serie B	0	0	0	0	0	0	0	0
Pro Patria (loan)	2022–23	Serie C	0	0	—		0	0	0	0
Career total			39	0	3	0	0	0	42	0
