= Alessandro Minelli (footballer, born 1999) =

Italian footballer

Personal information
- Date of birth: 23 July 1999 (age 27)
- Place of birth: Monza, Italy
- Height: 1.93 m (6 ft 4 in)
- Position: Defender

Team information
- Current team: Giugliano

Youth career
- 2016–2018: Inter Milan
- 2017–2018: → Pescara (loan)

Senior career*
Years	Team	Apps	(Gls)
2015–2016	Olginatese	8	(0)
2018–2019	Rende	21	(1)
2019–2020	Parma	0	(0)
2019	→ Rende (loan)	8	(0)
2019–2020	→ Trapani (loan)	1	(0)
2020–2024	Juventus	0	(0)
2020–2021	→ Bari (loan)	17	(0)
2021–2022	→ Cosenza (loan)	3	(0)
2022	→ Pro Vercelli (loan)	16	(0)
2022–2023	→ Virtus Francavilla (loan)	26	(1)
2023–2024	→ Pro Patria (loan)	26	(0)
2024–	Giugliano	29	(2)
2025–2026	→ Foggia (loan)	25	(1)
- * Club domestic league appearances and goals as of 1 May 2026

Alessandro Minelli (born 23 July 1999) is an Italian professional footballer who plays as a defender for Serie C Group C club Giugliano.

== Club career ==
=== Early career ===
He started his senior career in Serie D with Olginatese in the 2015–16 season. For the next two seasons he played for the Under-19 squads of Inter Milan and Pescara.

=== Rende ===
On 19 July 2018, he signed his first professional contract with Serie C club Rende for a two-year term. He made his Serie C debut for Rende on 16 September 2018 in a game against Paganese, as a starter.

=== Parma ===
==== Loan to Rende ====
On 30 January 2019, he signed a 4.5-year contract with Parma and was loaned back to Rende until the end of the 2018–19 season.

==== Loan to Trapani ====
On 2 September 2019, he joined Serie B club Trapani on loan.

=== Juventus ===
On 31 January 2020, Parma terminated his loan to Trapani early and sold his rights to Juventus.

==== Loans ====
On 4 September 2020, he joined Bari on loan with an option to purchase.

On 6 August 2021, he joined Cosenza on loan.

On 21 January 2022, he moved on a new loan to Pro Vercelli in Serie C.

On 1 September 2022, Minelli was loaned by Virtus Francavilla.

=== Giugliano ===
On 22 August 2024, Minelli signed a two-year contract with Giugliano.

== Honours and achievements ==
=== Club ===
Juventus U23

- Coppa Italia Serie C: 2019–20
