= Luca Coccolo =

Italian footballer (born 1998)

Personal information
- Date of birth: 23 February 1998 (age 28)
- Place of birth: Cirié, Italy
- Height: 1.87 m (6 ft 2 in)
- Position: Defender

Team information
- Current team: Pro Vercelli
- Number: 3

Youth career
- Juventus

Senior career*
Years	Team	Apps	(Gls)
2017–2022	Juventus	0	(0)
2017–2018	→ Perugia (loan)	0	(0)
2018	→ Prato (loan)	6	(0)
2018–2021	→ Juventus U23 (res.)	65	(0)
2021	→ Cremonese (loan)	3	(0)
2021–2022	→ SPAL (loan)	4	(0)
2022	→ Alessandria (loan)	7	(0)
2022–2024	Cesena	15	(0)
2024–2025	Torres	7	(0)
2025	→ Pro Patria (loan)	15	(0)
2025–	Pro Vercelli	36	(1)

International career^{‡}
2015	Italy U17	5	(0)
- * Club domestic league appearances and goals as of 30 April 2026 ‡ National team caps and goals as of 19:07, 7 March 2018 (UTC)

Luca Coccolo (born 23 February 1998) is an Italian professional footballer who plays as defender for Serie C Group A club Pro Vercelli.

== Club career ==
On 26 January 2021, Coccolo joined Cremonese on loan. On 23 June 2021, he moved to SPAL on loan. On 13 January 2022, he moved on a new loan to Alessandria.

On 13 July 2024, Coccolo signed with Torres.

== Honours ==
Juventus U23

- Coppa Italia Serie C: 2019–20
