= 2026–27 Juventus FC season =

Italian football club season

Juventus
2026–27 season
- Chairman: Gianluca Ferrero
- Head coach: Luciano Spalletti
- Stadium: Juventus Stadium
- Serie A: 6th
- Coppa Italia: Round of 16
- UEFA Europa League: League phase
- Top goalscorer: League: Bremer (3); All: Randal Kolo Muani; Nick Woltemade (5 each)
- Highest home attendance: 41,691 vs Napoli (1 November 2026, Serie A)
- Lowest home attendance: 40,271 vs Parma (29 August 2026, Serie A)
- Average home league attendance: 41,000
- Biggest win: Juventus 5–0 NEC
- Biggest defeat: Juventus 0–3 Lazio
Home colours	Away colours	Third colours
- All statistics correct as of 22 November 2026.

The 2026–27 season is Juventus Football Club's 129th season in existence and their 20th consecutive season in the top flight of Italian football. In addition to the domestic league, Juventus is participating in the Coppa Italia and the UEFA Europa League.

== Players ==
=== Squad information ===
Players, appearances, goals and squad numbers last updated on 1 November 2026. Appearances and goals include all official competition matches.
Note: Flags indicate national team as has been defined under FIFA eligibility rules. Players may hold more than one non-FIFA nationality.

No.	Player	Nat.	Position(s)	Date of birth (age)	Signed in	Contract ends	Signed from	Transfer fee	Apps.	Goals
Goalkeepers
1	Kamil Grabara	(Poland)	GK	8 January 1999 (age 27)	2026	2027	(Germany) Wolfsburg	€0.7M (loan)	0	0
23	Carlo Pinsoglio	(Italy)	GK	16 March 1990 (age 36)	2014	2027	(Italy) Vicenza	€0.7M	6	0
25	Guglielmo Vicario	(Italy)	GK	7 October 1996 (age 30)	2026	2027	(England) Tottenham Hotspur	Free (loan)	10	0
33	Neto	(Brazil)	GK	19 July 1989 (age 37)	2026	2027	(Brazil) Botafogo	Free	22	0
Defenders
2	Zeki Çelik	(Turkey)	RB / RWB / LB / LWB / CB	17 February 1997 (age 29)	2026	2029	(Italy) Roma	Free	6	1
3	Bremer	(Brazil)	CB	18 March 1997 (age 29)	2022	2029	(Italy) Torino	€41M	132	14
4	Federico Gatti	(Italy)	CB	24 June 1998 (age 28)	2022	2030	(Italy) Frosinone	€5.4M	142	11
6	Lloyd Kelly	(England)	CB / LB	6 October 1998 (age 28)	2025	2029	(England) Newcastle	€17.2M	71	2
15	Pierre Kalulu	(France)	CB / RB	5 June 2000 (age 26)	2024	2029	(Italy) Milan	€14.3M	102	3
20	Andrea Cambiaso	(Italy)	RB / RWB / LB / LWB	20 February 2000 (age 26)	2022	2029	(Italy) Genoa	€8.8M	141	8
24	Daniele Rugani	(Italy)	CB	29 July 1994 (age 32)	2015	2028	(Italy) Empoli	€3.5M	157	11
26	Jhon Lucumí	(Colombia)	CB	26 June 1998 (age 28)	2026	2030	(Italy) Bologna	€19.5M	9	0
32	Juan Cabal	(Colombia)	CB / LB	8 January 2001 (age 25)	2024	2029	(Italy) Hellas Verona	€12.8M	31	2
Midfielders
5	Manuel Locatelli (c)	(Italy)	CM / DM	8 January 1998 (age 28)	2021	2030	(Italy) Sassuolo	€30M	232	9
8	Teun Koopmeiners	(Netherlands)	CM / DM / AM	28 February 1998 (age 28)	2024	2029	(Italy) Atalanta	€54.7M	98	8
12	Douglas Luiz	(Brazil)	CM	9 May 1998 (age 28)	2024	2029	(England) Aston Villa	€50M	37	1
17	Kerim Alajbegović	(Bosnia and Herzegovina)	AM/LW	21 September 2007 (age 19)	2026	2031	(Germany) Bayer Leverkusen	€32M	9	1
19	Khéphren Thuram	(France)	CM	26 March 2001 (age 25)	2024	2029	(France) Nice	€20M	96	9
22	Weston McKennie	(United States)	CM / RB / RWB	28 August 1998 (age 28)	2020	2030	(Germany) Schalke 04	€22M	239	28
29	Pape Matar Sarr	(Senegal)	CM / AM	14 September 2002 (age 24)	2026	2027	(England) Tottenham Hotspur	€2.8M (loan)	6	0
31	Nico González	(Argentina)	AM / RW / LW	6 April 1998 (age 28)	2024	2030	(Italy) Fiorentina	€28.1M	46	6
41	Augusto Owusu	(Italy)	CM / DM	28 January 2005 (age 21)	2024	2028	(Italy) Youth Sector	N/A	0	0
Forwards
7	Francisco Conceição	(Portugal)	RW / LW	14 December 2002 (age 23)	2024	2030	(Portugal) Porto	€32M	88	12
9	Randal Kolo Muani	(France)	ST	5 December 1998 (age 27)	2026	2031	(France) Paris Saint-Germain	€41.2M	32	12
10	Kenan Yıldız	(Turkey)	AM	4 May 2005 (age 21)	2023	2030	(Italy) Youth Sector	N/A	132	27
11	Edon Zhegrova	(Kosovo)	RW / LW	31 March 1999 (age 27)	2025	2030	(France) Lille	€15.5M	33	0
13	Jérémie Boga	(Ivory Coast)	LW / AM	3 January 1997 (age 29)	2026	2029	(France) Nice	€4.8M	24	5
14	Arkadiusz Milik	(Poland)	ST	28 February 1994 (age 32)	2022	2027	(France) Marseille	€6.3M	77	17
18	Jeff Ekhator	(Italy)	ST / RW	11 November 2006 (age 20)	2026	2031	(Italy) Genoa	€16.4M	0	0
27	Nick Woltemade	(Germany)	ST / AM	14 February 2002 (age 24)	2026	2027	(England) Newcastle United	€3.6M (loan)	8	2
45	Justin Oboavwoduo	(England)	ST	23 August 2006 (age 20)	2026	2028	(England) Manchester City	Free	0	0
Players transferred during the season
1	Mattia Perin	(Italy)	GK	10 November 1992 (age 34)	2018	2027	(Italy) Genoa	€12M	70	0
16	Michele Di Gregorio	(Italy)	GK	27 July 1997 (age 29)	2024	2029	(Italy) Monza	€14.3M	84	0
21	Fabio Miretti	(Italy)	CM / AM	3 August 2003 (age 23)	2021	2028	(Italy) Youth Sector	N/A	106	3
30	Jonathan David	(Canada)	ST	16 February 2000 (age 26)	2025	2030	(France) Lille	Free	47	8

== Transfers ==
=== Summer 2026 ===
==== In ====
Date	Pos.	Player	Age	Moving from	Fee	Notes	Source
1 July 2026	DF	(Italy) Daniele Rugani	31	(Italy) Fiorentina	—N/a	End of loan	
1 July 2026	MF	(Brazil) Douglas Luiz	28	(England) Aston Villa	—N/a	End of loan	
1 July 2026	MF	(Argentina) Nico González	28	(Spain) Atlético Madrid	—N/a	End of loan	
1 July 2026	FW	(Italy) Jeff Ekhator	19	(Italy) Genoa	€16.4M	Variables for €2M and for future sale	
16 July 2026	DF	(Turkey) Zeki Çelik	29	(Italy) Roma	Free	End of contract	
2 August 2026	MF	(Bosnia and Herzegovina) Kerim Alajbegović	18	(Germany) Bayer Leverkusen	€32M	Variables for €5M	
2 August 2026	FW	(France) Randal Kolo Muani	27	(France) Paris Saint Germain	€41.2M	Variables for €12M	
17 August 2026	DF	(Colombia) Jhon Lucumí	28	(Italy) Bologna	€20.1M	Variables for €2M	
18 August 2026	GK	(Italy) Guglielmo Vicario	29	(England) Tottenham Hotspur	—N/a	On loan until June 2027 with option to buy for €8M and variables for €2M	
25 August 2026	GK	(Poland) Kamil Grabara	27	(Germany) VfL Wolfsburg	€0.7M	On loan until June 2027 with option to buy for €11.5M and variables for €0.3M	
1 September 2026	MF	(Senegal) Pape Matar Sarr	23	(England) Tottenham Hotspur	€2.8M	On loan until June 2027 with option to buy for €27.5M	
1 September 2026	FW	(Germany) Nick Woltemade	24	(England) Newcastle United	€3.6M	On loan until June 2027 and variables for €0.5M	
28 September 2026	GK	(Brazil) Neto	37	(Brazil) Botafogo FR	Free	End of contract	

==== Out ====
Date	Pos.	Player	Age	Moving to	Fee	Notes	Source
30 June 2026	DF	(Sweden) Emil Holm	26	(Italy) Bologna	—N/a	End of loan	
28 July 2026	FW	(Belgium) Loïs Openda	26	(France) Lyon	€3.5M	On loan until June 2027	
3 August 2026	MF	(Montenegro) Vasilije Adžić	20	(Italy) Sassuolo	€0.5M	On loan until June 2027 with an option to buy for €12M and buy-back option for €13.7M	
6 August 2026	MF	(Serbia) Filip Kostić	33	(Netherlands) PSV Eindhoven	Free	End of contract	
12 August 2026	FW	(Serbia) Dušan Vlahović	26	(Turkey) Beşiktaş	Free	End of contract	
24 August 2026	GK	(Italy) Mattia Perin	33	(Italy) Palermo	€0.4M		
25 August 2026	GK	(Italy) Michele Di Gregorio	29	(England) Bournemouth	€1.3M	On loan until June 2027 with an option to buy for €12.7M and variables for €0.8M and €1.5M	
28 August 2026	MF	(Italy) Fabio Miretti	23	(Turkey) Beşiktaş	€2.1M	On loan until June 2027 with an option to buy for €13M	
1 September 2025	FW	(Canada) Jonathan David	25	(Spain) Atlético Madrid	—N/a	On loan until June 2027 with an option to buy for €25M	

==== Other acquisitions ====
Date	Pos.	Player	Age	Moving from	Fee	Notes	Source
15 June 2026	FW	(Ivory Coast) Jérémie Boga	29	(France) Nice	€4.8M	Redeem after loan and variables for €0.8M	
19 June 2026	MF	(Italy) Giacomo Faticanti	21	(Italy) Lecce	€1M	Redeem after loan	
20 June 2026	GK	(Italy) Giovanni Daffara	21	(Italy) Avellino	€0.5M	Buy back option	
30 June 2026	FW	(Belgium) Loïs Openda	26	(Germany) RB Leipzig	€42.75M	Redeem after loan and variables for €0.8M	
1 July 2026	GK	(Italy) Simone Cat Berro	21	(Italy) Cairese	—N/a	End of loan to play for Juventus Next Gen	
1 July 2026	DF	(France) Louis Reynaud	18	(France) Toulouse	Free	To play for Juventus Next Gen	
1 July 2026	MF	(Italy) Diego Ripani	20	(Italy) Forlì	—N/a	End of loan to play for Juventus Next Gen	
7 July 2026	FW	(Italy) Daniel Okolo	18	(Italy) Triestina	Free	To play for Juventus Next Gen	
15 July 2026	FW	(Italy) Ismaël Konaté	20	(Italy) Empoli	Undisclosed	To play for Juventus Next Gen	
11 August 2026	DF	(Italy) Christian Corradi	21	(Italy) Hellas Verona	—N/a	On loan to play for Juventus Next Gen	
30 August 2026	FW	(Belgium) Ali Camara	18	(Belgium) Club Brugge	€1.5M	To play for Juventus Next Gen	
1 September 2026	MF	(Italy) Filippo Melegoni	27	(Italy) Carrarese Calcio	Undisclosed	To play for Juventus Next Gen	

==== Other disposals ====
Date	Pos.	Player	Age	Moving to	Fee	Notes	Source
30 June 2026	DF	(Uruguay) Facundo González	23	(Spain) Racing Santander	€2.5M	Redeem after loan	
30 June 2026	DF	(Italy) Gabriele Mulazzi	23	(Switzerland) Sion	—N/a	End of loan	
30 June 2026	MF	(Italy) Mattia Compagnon	24	(Italy) Venezia	€1M	Redeem after loan	
30 June 2026	MF	(Italy) Alessandro Sersanti	24	(Italy) Modena	€1M	Redeem after loan and variables for future sale	
30 June 2026	FW	(United States) Timothy Weah	26	(France) Marseille	€14.4M	Redeem after loan plus variables for €4.1M and for future sale	
30 June 2026	DF	(Italy) Filippo Scaglia	34	—N/a	Free	Retired	
1 July 2026	GK	(Italy) Giovanni Daffara	21	(Italy) Parma	€6M	Variables for future sale	
1 July 2026	FW	(Argentina) Juan Ignacio Quattrocchi	22	(Argentina) Acassuso	Free	Released	
2 July 2026	DF	(Austria) David Puczka	21	(Italy) Genoa	€6M	Variables for future sale	
8 July 2026	DF	(Italy) Brando Moruzzi	21	(Italy) Avellino	—N/a	On loan until June 2027 with option to buy	
8 July 2026	MF	(Italy) Giacomo Faticanti	21	(Italy) Avellino	—N/a	On loan until June 2027 with option to buy	
8 July 2026	FW	(Italy) Alessandro Pietrelli	23	(Italy) LR Vicenza	—N/a	On loan until June 2027 with option to buy	
10 July 2026	FW	(Italy) Gianmarco Di Biase	20	(England) Crawley Town	€0.23M		
20 July 2026	FW	(Italy) Diego Pugno	20	(Netherlands) Ajax	—N/a	On loan until June 2027 with option to buy to play for Jong Ajax	
24 July 2026	FW	(Italy) Alessio Vacca	21	(Italy) Folgore Caratese	—N/a	On loan until June 2027	
28 July 2026	DF	(Italy) Lorenzo Villa	23	(Switzerland) Sion	€0.25M		
30 July 2026	DF	(Sweden) Jonas Rouhi	22	(Italy) Carrarese	—N/a	Renewal of loan until June 2027	
3 August 2026	DF	(Portugal) João Mário	26	(Italy) Fiorentina	€1.8M	On loan until june 2027 with an option to buy for €9.5M	
3 August 2024	FW	(Italy) Leonardo Cerri	21	(France) Grenoble	Undisclosed		
4 August 2026	DF	(Brazil) Pedro Felipe	22	(Spain) Racing Santander	€0.5M		
4 August 2026	MF	(Italy) Francesco Crapisto	19	(Italy) Crotone	—N/a	On loan until June 2027	
10 August 2026	GK	(Italy) Simone Scaglia	22	(Italy) Padova	Free	Released	
15 August 2026	FW	(Italy) Tommaso Mancini	22	(Italy) Livorno	—N/a	On loan until June 2027	
20 August 2026	FW	(Italy) Emanuele Pecorino	25	(Italy) Catanzaro	€0.9M		
25 August 2026	FW	(Italy) Serigne Deme	21	(Netherlands) Volendam	Free		
30 August 2026	MF	(Germany) Adin Ličina	19	(Italy) Cremonese	—N/a	On loan until June 2027	
30 August 2026	MF	(Italy) Valdes Ngana	20	(Italy) Foggia	—N/a	On loan until June 2027	
31 August 2026	MF	(Brazil) Arthur	30	(Brazil) Santos	Free	Released	
1 September 2026	DF	(Spain) Bruno Martinez	20	(Spain) UCAM Murcia	—N/a	On loan until June 2027	
1 September 2026	DF	(Spain) Gil Puche	20	(Spain) Atlético Madrid	—N/a	On loan until June 2027 with option to buy and buy-back option to play for Atlético Madrileño	
1 September 2026	FW	(Italy) Lorenzo Anghelè	21	(Italy) Südtirol	—N/a	On loan until June 2027	
1 September 2026	FW	(Italy) Nicolò Cudrig	24	(Italy) Carrarese	—N/a	On loan until June 2027	
2 September 2026	FW	(Croatia) Ivano Srdoč	21	(Switzerland) Sion	Undisclosed		

== Pre-season and friendlies ==
18 July 2026 Friendly	Basel	0–0	Juventus	Basel, Switzerland
15:30 CEST (UTC+2)	Otele (penalty missed) 58'; Salvi (red card) 85'	Report	Cambiaso (yellow card) 38'; João Mário (yellow card) 90+3'	Stadium: St. Jakob-Park; Attendance: 24,206; Referee: Lukas Fähndrich (Switzerland)

25 July 2026 Friendly	Standard Liège	0–1	Juventus	Liège, Belgium
20:00 CEST (UTC+2)		Report	Miretti 55', (yellow card) 69'	Stadium: Stade Maurice Dufrasne; Attendance: 17,000; Referee: Jasper Vergoote (Belgium)

31 July 2026 Friendly	Juventus	2–0	Nice	Turin, Italy
18:00 CEST (UTC+2)	Douglas Luiz 11'; Oboavwoduo 89'	Report		Stadium: Juventus Training Center; Attendance: 400; Referee: Luca Pairetto (Italy)

5 August 2026 Friendly	Chelsea	0–1	Juventus	Kowloon, Hong Kong
19:30 HKT (UTC+8)	Caicedo (yellow card) 62'; Lavia (yellow card) 81'	Report	Douglas Luiz (yellow card) 58'; Zhegrova 68'; Gatti (yellow card) 71'; Bremer (yellow card) 81'	Stadium: Kai Tak Sports Park; Attendance: 43,375; Referee: Wai-Sing Ho (Hong Kong)

8 August 2026 Friendly	Juventus	1–2	Internazionale	Perth, Australia
19:00 AWST (UTC+8)	Rugani (yellow card) 75'; Conceição 85'	Report	Dimarco 20'; Diouf 62'	Stadium: Perth Stadium; Attendance: 50,325; Referee: Tim Danaskos (Australia)

11 August 2026 Friendly	Juventus	2–0	Palermo	Perth, Australia
18:00 AWST (UTC+8)	Douglas Luiz (yellow card) 5'; Yıldız 44'; Milik 86'	Report		Stadium: Perth Rectangular Stadium; Attendance: 15,352; Referee: Shaun Evans (Australia)

17 August 2026 Friendly	Juventus	2–0	Juventus Next Gen	Turin, Italy
18:00 CEST (UTC+2)	Conceição 18'; McKennie 30'	Report		Stadium: Juventus Stadium; Attendance: 23,000; Referee: Gabriele Scatena (Italy)
Note: The match was called off at the 46th minute due to the annual tradition of pitch invasion.

== Competitions ==
=== Overview ===
Competition	First match	Last match	Starting round	Final position	Record							
Competition	First match	Last match	Starting round	Final position	Pld	W	D	L	GF	GA	GD	Win %
Serie A	23 August 2026	30 May 2027	Matchday 1	TBD	12	6	3	3	19	12	+7	50.00
Coppa Italia	3 December 2026	TBD	Round of 16	TBD	0	0	0	0	0	0	+0	—
UEFA Europa League	17 September 2026	TBD	League phase	TBD	4	3	1	0	11	4	+7	75.00
Total					16	9	4	3	30	16	+14	56.25

Last updated: 22 November 2026
Source: Soccerway

=== Serie A ===
==== League table ====
Pos	Team	Pld	W	D	L	GF	GA	GD	Pts	Qualification or relegation
6	Frosinone	11	6	2	3	24	15	+9	20	Qualification for the Conference League play-off round
7	Napoli	12	5	3	4	19	14	+5	18	
8	Juventus	12	5	3	4	15	22	−7	18	
9	Bologna	11	5	2	4	16	14	+2	17	
10	Cagliari	12	5	1	6	10	17	−7	16	

Updated to match(es) played on 21 November 2026. Source: Serie A
Rules for classification: 1) Points; 2) Head-to-head points; 3) Head-to-head goal difference; 4) Goal difference; 5) Goals scored; 6) Drawing of lots.
End-of-season ties on points for 1st or 17th are instead decided by a one- or two-leg play-off, respectively, unless the play-off would involve a UEFA competition finalist (in which case rules 2–6 apply). Rules 2–6 determine home advantage (for 17th, the better-ranked team hosts the second leg); if three or more teams are tied, they also select the two play-off teams.

==== Results summary ====
Overall								Home						Away					
Pld	W	D	L	GF	GA	GD	Pts	W	D	L	GF	GA	GD	W	D	L	GF	GA	GD
12	6	3	3	19	12	+7	21	4	1	1	11	4	+7	2	2	2	8	8	0

Last updated: 22 November 2026.
Source: Serie A

==== Results by round ====
Round	1	2	3	4	5	6	7	8	9	10	11	12	13	14	15	16	17	18	19	20	21	22	23	24	25	26	27	28	29	30	31	32	33	34	35	36	37	38
Ground	A	H	H	A	H	A	H	A	A	H	A	H	A	H	H	A	A	H	A	H	H	A	H	A	H	A	H	A	H	A	H	A	H	A	A	H	A	H
Result	W	W	D	L	W	D	L	W	L	W	D	W																										
Position	8	4	6	8	7	6	8	7	8	7	7																											

Updated to match(es) played on 22 November 2026. Source: Serie A
A = Away; H = Home; W = Win; D = Draw; L = Loss

==== Matches ====
The league fixtures were released on 5 June 2026.

23 August 2026 1	Frosinone	0–1	Juventus	Frosinone
18:30 CEST (UTC+2)	Schmid (yellow card) 43'; Calvani (yellow card) 90+3'	Report	Bremer 22'; Çelik (yellow card) 50'; Cambiaso (yellow card) 81'	Stadium: Stadio Benito Stirpe; Attendance: 15,256; Referee: Giovanni Ayroldi

29 August 2026 2	Juventus	2–0	Parma	Turin
20:45 CEST (UTC+2)	Lucumí (yellow card) 10'; Locatelli (yellow card) 54'; González 62'; Koopmeiners 88'	Report	Del Prato (yellow card) 55'; Troilo (yellow card) 78'; Konaté (yellow card) 90+3'	Stadium: Juventus Stadium; Attendance: 40,271; Referee: Francesco Fourneau

6 September 2026 3	Juventus	1–1	Milan	Turin
20:45 CEST (UTC+2)	Gatti 90+2', (yellow card) 90+6'	Report	Cisse 68', (yellow card) 90+6'; Estupiñán (yellow card) 79'; De Winter (yellow card) 90+2'	Stadium: Juventus Stadium; Attendance: 41,577; Referee: Maurizio Mariani

13 September 2026 4	Sassuolo	3–2	Juventus	Reggio Emilia
20:45 CEST (UTC+2)	Lipani (yellow card) 48'; Esposito 65'; Bowie 89'; Leysen (yellow card) 90+3'; Adžić 90+4'	Report	Lucumí (yellow card) 20'; Douglas Luiz (yellow card) 76'; Zhegrova 82', 90+1'	Stadium: Mapei Stadium – Città del Tricolore; Attendance: 16,700; Referee: Juan Luca Sacchi

20 September 2026 5	Juventus	2–0	Atalanta	Turin
18:00 CEST (UTC+2)	Conceição (yellow card) 22', (goal) 28'; Bremer 77'	Report	Kristensen (yellow card) 17'; Kessié (yellow card) 43'	Stadium: Juventus Stadium; Attendance: 40,351; Referee: Luca Zufferli

11 October 2026 6	Cagliari	1–1	Juventus	Cagliari
20:45 CEST (UTC+2)	Maldini 20'; Rodríguez (yellow card) 45+1'; Deiola (yellow card) 83'	Report	McKennie (yellow card) 17'; Kolo Muani 81'	Stadium: Unipol Domus; Attendance: 16,334; Referee: Matteo Marcenaro

18 October 2026 7	Juventus	0–3	Lazio	Turin
20:45 CEST (UTC+2)		Report	Provstgaard 37'; Taylor (yellow card) 41'; Zaccagni (yellow card) 48'; Isaksen 66'; Dele-Bashiru 89'	Stadium: Juventus Stadium; Attendance: 41,112; Referee: Davide Massa

25 October 2026 8	Lecce	0–2	Juventus	Lecce
18:00 CET (UTC+1)	Gaspar (yellow card) 76' (yellow-red card) 90+4'	Report	McKennie 29'; Douglas Luiz 41'	Stadium: Stadio Via del mare Attendance: 27,130; Referee: Fabio Maresca

28 October 2026 9	Genoa	2–0	Juventus	Genoa
20:45 CET (UTC+1)	Ehizibue 12'; Baldanzi 28'	Report	Zhegrova (yellow card) 71'	Stadium: Stadio Luigi Ferraris; Attendance: 30,657; Referee: Daniele Doveri

1 November 2026 10	Juventus	2–0	Napoli	Turin
20:45 CET (UTC+1)	Douglas Luiz (yellow card) 16'; Lucumí (yellow card) 20'; Alajbegović 70', (yellow card) 71'; Boga 87'	Report	Marianucci (yellow card) 38' (yellow-red card) 75'; Marín (yellow card) 90+1'	Stadium: Juventus Stadium; Attendance: 41,691; Referee: Simone Sozza

8 November 2026 11	Fiorentina	2–2	Juventus	Florence
20:45 CET (UTC+1)	Pellegrino 4'; Inao Oulaï (yellow card) 50'; Njie 54'	Report	Cabal (yellow card) 13'; Bremer (yellow card) 22', (goal) 66'; Woltemade 32'; Kolo Muani (yellow card) 74'	Stadium: Stadio Artemio Franchi; Attendance: 22,609; Referee: Andrea Colombo

22 November 2026 12	Juventus	4–0	Venezia	Turin
12:30 CET (UTC+1) (Note: The match was originally scheduled for 23 November 2026, 20:45 CET (UTC+1), before being moved a day earlier, 12:30 CET (UTC+1).)	Woltemade 53'; Koopmeiners 59'; Cabal 65'; Kolo Muani 71' (pen.)	Report		Stadium: Juventus Stadium; Attendance: 41,245; Referee: Alberto Ruben Arena

29 November 2026 13	Como	v	Juventus	Como
20:45 CET (UTC+1)		Report		Stadium: Stadio Giuseppe Sinigaglia

6 December 2026 14	Juventus	v	Udinese	Turin
18:00 CET (UTC+1)		Report		Stadium: Juventus Stadium

14 December 2026 15	Juventus	v	Monza	Turin
20:45 CET (UTC+1)		Report		Stadium: Juventus Stadium

19 December 2026 16	Roma	v	Juventus	Rome
20:45 CET (UTC+1)		Report		Stadium: Stadio Olimpico

3 January 2027 17	Bologna	v	Juventus	Bologna
20:45 CET (UTC+1)		Report		Stadium: Stadio Renato Dall'Ara

6 January 2027 18	Juventus	v	Torino	Turin
12:30 CET (UTC+1)		Report		Stadium: Juventus Stadium

10 January 2027 19	Internazionale	v	Juventus	Milan
20:45 CET (UTC+1)		Report		Stadium: San Siro

16 January 2027 20	Juventus	v	Genoa	Turin
--:-- CET (UTC+1)		Report		Stadium: Juventus Stadium

23 January 2027 21	Juventus	v	Cagliari	Turin
--:-- CET (UTC+1)		Report		Stadium: Juventus Stadium

30 January 2027 22	Milan	v	Juventus	Milan
--:-- CET (UTC+1)		Report		Stadium: San Siro

6 February 2027 23	Juventus	v	Sassuolo	Turin
--:-- CET (UTC+1)		Report		Stadium: Juventus Stadium

13 February 2027 24	Napoli	v	Juventus	Naples
--:-- CET (UTC+1)		Report		Stadium: Stadio Diego Armando Maradona

20 February 2027 25	Juventus	v	Bologna	Turin
--:-- CET (UTC+1)		Report		Stadium: Juventus Stadium

27 February 2027 26	Monza	v	Juventus	Monza
--:-- CET (UTC+1)		Report		Stadium: Stadio Brianteo

6 March 2027 27	Juventus	v	Roma	Turin
--:-- CET (UTC+1)		Report		Stadium: Juventus Stadium

13 March 2027 28	Lazio	v	Juventus	Rome
--:-- CET (UTC+1)		Report		Stadium: Stadio Olimpico

20 March 2027 29	Juventus	v	Como	Turin
--:-- CET (UTC+1)		Report		Stadium: Juventus Stadium

3 April 2027 30	Torino	v	Juventus	Turin
--:-- CEST (UTC+2)		Report		Stadium: Stadio Olimpico Grande Torino

10 April 2027 31	Juventus	v	Lecce	Turin
--:-- CEST (UTC+2)		Report		Stadium: Juventus Stadium

17 April 2027 32	Venezia	v	Juventus	Venice
--:-- CEST (UTC+2)		Report		Stadium: Stadio Pier Luigi Penzo

24 April 2027 33	Juventus	v	Fiorentina	Turin
--:-- CEST (UTC+2)		Report		Stadium: Juventus Stadium

1 May 2027 34	Atalanta	v	Juventus	Bergamo
--:-- CEST (UTC+2)		Report		Stadium: Stadio Atleti Azzurri d'Italia

8 May 2027 35	Udinese	v	Juventus	Udine
--:-- CEST (UTC+2)		Report		Stadium: Stadio Friuli

15 May 2027 36	Juventus	v	Internazionale	Turin
--:-- CEST (UTC+2)		Report		Stadium: Juventus Stadium

22 May 2027 37	Parma	v	Juventus	Parma
--:-- CEST (UTC+2)		Report		Stadium: Stadio Ennio Tardini

29 May 2027 38	Juventus	v	Frosinone	Turin
--:-- CEST (UTC+2)		Report		Stadium: Juventus Stadium

=== Coppa Italia ===
3 December 2026 Round of 16	Juventus	v	Sassuolo	Turin
21:00 CET (UTC+1)		Report		Stadium: Juventus Stadium

=== UEFA Europa League ===
==== League phase ====
The league phase draw was held on 28 August 2026.

Pos	Team	Pld	W	D	L	GF	GA	GD	Pts	Qualification
3	(Hungary) Ferencváros	4	4	0	0	11	3	+8	12	Advance to round of 16 (seeded)
4	(Belgium) Union Saint-Gilloise	4	3	1	0	10	2	+8	10	Advance to round of 16 (seeded)
5	(Italy) Juventus	4	3	1	0	11	4	+7	10	Advance to round of 16 (seeded)
6	(Greece) Olympiacos	4	3	1	0	4	1	+3	10	Advance to round of 16 (seeded)
7	(Germany) Bayer Leverkusen	4	3	0	1	8	1	+7	9	Advance to round of 16 (seeded)

Updated to match(es) played on 5 November 2026. Source: UEFA
Rules for classification: League phase tiebreakers

Round	1	2	3	4	5	6	7	8
Ground	H	A	H	A	H	A	A	H
Result	W	W	D	W				
Position	1	1	7	5				

Updated to match(es) played on 5 November 2026. Source: UEFA
A = Away; H = Home; W = Win; D = Draw; L = Loss

17 September 2026 1	Juventus (Italy)	5–0	(Netherlands) NEC	Turin, Italy
21:00 CEST (UTC+2)	González 9'; Alajbegović 24'; Woltemade 35' (pen.); Douglas Luiz (yellow card) 53'; Çelik 75'; Kolo Muani 82'	Report	Monteiro (yellow card) 52'	Stadium: Juventus Stadium; Attendance: 41,407; Referee: Oleksiy Derevinskyi (Ukraine)

15 October 2026 2	Celta Vigo (Spain)	1–2	(Italy) Juventus	Vigo, Spain
21:00 CEST (UTC+2)	Álvarez 18'; Swedberg (yellow card) 39'; Moriba (yellow card) 84'	Report	Kelly (yellow card) 54'; Woltemade 58'; Lucumí (yellow card) 72'; Kolo Muani 90+2'	Stadium: Balaídos; Attendance: 21,805; Referee: Sander van der Eijk (Netherlands)

22 October 2026 3	Juventus (Italy)	2–2	(France) Rennes	Turin, Italy
18:45 CEST (UTC+2)	Çelik 5'; Gatti (yellow card) 20'; Woltemade 67' (pen.)	Report	Al-Taamari 15'; Dia 43' (pen.); Aït Boudlal (yellow card) 82'	Stadium: Juventus Stadium; Attendance: 41,554; Referee: Morten Krogh (Denmark)

5 November 2026 4	AZ (Netherlands)	1–2	(Italy) Juventus	Alkmaar, Netherlands
21:00 CET (UTC+1)	Hoedt (yellow card) 28'; Meerdink 88'	Report	T. Koopmeiners 19'; Kolo Muani 37'; Cambiaso (yellow card) 48'; Ekhator (yellow card) 85'; Cabal (yellow card) 90+4'	Stadium: AFAS Stadion; Attendance: 18,954; Referee: Damian Sylwestrzak (Poland)

26 November 2026 5	Juventus (Italy)	v	(Cyprus) Omonia	Turin, Italy
21:00 CET (UTC+1)		Report		Stadium: Juventus Stadium

10 December 2026 6	Hapoel Be'er Sheva (Israel)	v	(Italy) Juventus	Bucharest, Romania
18:45 CET (UTC+1)		Report		Stadium: Rapid-Giulești Stadium (Note: Due to the Gaza war, Israeli teams are required to play their home matches at neutral venues until further notice.)

21 January 2027 7	Ferencváros (Hungary)	v	(Italy) Juventus	Budapest, Hungary
18:45 CET (UTC+1)		Report		Stadium: Ferencváros Stadion

28 January 2027 8	Juventus (Italy)	v	(Spain) Real Sociedad	Turin, Italy
21:00 CET (UTC+1)		Report		Stadium: Juventus Stadium

== Statistics ==
=== Appearances and goals ===
No.	Pos	Nat	Player	Total		Serie A		Coppa Italia		Europa League	
No.	Pos	Nat	Player	Apps	Goals	Apps	Goals	Apps	Goals	Apps	Goals
Goalkeepers
1	GK	(Poland) POL	Kamil Grabara	1	0	0	0	0	0	1	0
23	GK	(Italy) ITA	Carlo Pinsoglio	0	0	0	0	0	0	0	0
25	GK	(Italy) ITA	Guglielmo Vicario	12	0	10	0	0	0	2	0
33	GK	(Brazil) BRA	Neto	0	0	0	0	0	0	0	0
Defenders
2	DF	(Turkey) TUR	Zeki Çelik	9	2	7	0	0	0	2	2
3	DF	(Brazil) BRA	Bremer	13	2	10	2	0	0	1+2	0
4	DF	(Italy) ITA	Federico Gatti	7	1	2+2	1	0	0	3	0
6	DF	(England) ENG	Lloyd Kelly	7	0	1+4	0	0	0	2	0
15	DF	(France) FRA	Pierre Kalulu	13	0	10	0	0	0	2+1	0
20	DF	(Italy) ITA	Andrea Cambiaso	9	0	2+5	0	0	0	2	0
24	DF	(Italy) ITA	Daniele Rugani	0	0	0	0	0	0	0	0
26	DF	(Colombia) COL	Jhon Lucumí	12	0	9	0	0	0	1+2	0
32	DF	(Colombia) COL	Juan Cabal	3	0	1+2	0	0	0	0	0
Midfielders
5	MF	(Italy) ITA	Manuel Locatelli	3	0	3	0	0	0	0	0
8	MF	(Netherlands) NED	Teun Koopmeiners	12	1	3+6	1	0	0	2+1	0
12	MF	(Brazil) BRA	Douglas Luiz	13	1	10	1	0	0	2+1	0
17	MF	(Bosnia and Herzegovina) BIH	Kerim Alajbegović	12	2	6+3	1	0	0	2+1	1
19	MF	(France) FRA	Khéphren Thuram	0	0	0	0	0	0	0	0
22	MF	(United States) USA	Weston McKennie	10	1	7	1	0	0	3	0
29	MF	(Senegal) SEN	Pape Matar Sarr	8	0	3+3	0	0	0	2	0
31	MF	(Argentina) ARG	Nico González	8	2	5+1	1	0	0	1+1	1
41	MF	(Italy) ITA	Augusto Owusu	0	1	0	0	0	0+1	0	
Forwards
7	FW	(Portugal) POR	Francisco Conceição	10	1	6+1	1	0	0	1+2	0
9	FW	(France) FRA	Randal Kolo Muani	13	3	10	1	0	0	1+2	2
10	FW	(Turkey) TUR	Kenan Yıldız	1	0	1	0	0	0	0	0
11	FW	(Kosovo) KOS	Edon Zhegrova	8	2	0+8	2	0	0	0	0
13	FW	(Ivory Coast) CIV	Jérémie Boga	8	1	1+6	1	0	0	0+1	0
14	FW	(Poland) POL	Arkadiusz Milik	0	0	0	0	0	0	0	0
18	FW	(Italy) ITA	Jeff Ekhator	0	0	0	0	0	0	0	0
27	FW	(Germany) GER	Nick Woltemade	11	3	2+6	0	0	0	3	3
45	FW	(England) ENG	Justin Oboavwoduo	1	0	0+1	0	0	0	0	0
Players transferred during the season
1	GK	(Italy) ITA	Mattia Perin	1	0	0+1	0	0	0	0	0
16	GK	(Italy) ITA	Michele Di Gregorio	0	0	0	0	0	0	0	0
21	MF	(Italy) ITA	Fabio Miretti	0	0	0	0	0	0	0	0
30	FW	(Canada) CAN	Jonathan David	1	0	1	0	0	0	0	0

Last updated: 1 November 2026
Source: Competitions

=== Goalscorers ===
Rank	No.	Pos.	Player	Serie A	Coppa Italia	Europa League	Total
1	9	FW	(France) Randal Kolo Muani	2	0	3	5
1	27	FW	(Germany) Nick Woltemade	2	0	3	5
3	3	DF	(Brazil) Bremer	3	0	0	3
3	8	MF	(Netherlands) Teun Koopmeiners	2	0	1	3
5	2	DF	(Turkey) Zeki Çelik	0	0	2	2
5	11	FW	(Kosovo) Edon Zhegrova	2	0	0	2
5	17	MF	(Bosnia and Herzegovina) Kerim Alajbegović	1	0	1	2
5	31	MF	(Argentina) Nico González	1	0	1	2
9	4	DF	(Italy) Federico Gatti	1	0	0	1
9	7	FW	(Portugal) Francisco Conceição	1	0	0	1
9	12	MF	(Brazil) Douglas Luiz	1	0	0	1
9	13	FW	(Ivory Coast) Jérémie Boga	1	0	0	1
9	22	MF	(United States) Weston McKennie	1	0	0	1
9	32	DF	(Colombia) Juan Cabal	1	0	0	1
Totals				19	0	11	30

Last updated: 22 November 2026
Source: Competitions
