= 2018–19 Juventus FC Under-23 season =

Juventus U23
2018–19 season
- Manager: Mauro Zironelli
- Stadium: Stadio Giuseppe Moccagatta
- Serie C: 12th
- Coppa Italia Serie C: Group stage
Home colours	Away colours	Third colours

The 2018–19 season was the 1st season of Juventus U23 and the club's first consecutive season in the Serie C, the third level of Italian football. Mauro Zironelli was entrusted with coaching the reserve team for their debut. Juventus U23's first-ever match came on 21 August 2018 in a Coppa Italia Serie C match won against Cuneo 1–0 with Luca Zanimacchia scoring their first goal in their history. Five days later, Juventus U23 were eliminated from the Coppa Italia Serie C following a 2–2 with newly-promoted Albissola despite late goals from former Arsenal player Stephy Mavididi and Primavera product Marco Olivieri. Juventus U23's league debut took place on 16 September with a 1–2 loss to Alessandria: Claudio Zappa scored their first league goal after catching a rebound from a failed penalty kick. Owing to a disappointing 12th place in the league table, Zironelli was sacked at the end of the season.

== Serie C ==
Date	Opponent	Venue	Result	Scorers
16 September 2018	Alessandria	Home	1–2	Zappa 85'
24 September 2018	Carrarese	Away	0–4	
27 September 2018	Cuneo	Home	4–0	Pereira 23', 75', Bunino 86', Muratore 88'
30 September 2018	Novara	Away	1–1	Bunino 18' (p)
8 October 2018	Pro Patria	Home	2–0	Touré 48', Pereira 80'
14 October 2018	Arzachena	Away	0–1	
18 October 2018	Arezzo	Home	3–1	Pereira 13', Muratore 70', Bunino 90'+2'
21 October 2018	Siena	Home	2–2	Pereira 5', Mavididi 9'
28 October 2018	Lucchese	Away	2–3	Kastanos 39', Mavididi 80'
5 November 2018	Piacenza	Home	0–2	
11 November 2018	Albissola	Away	0–1	
18 November 2018	Pontedera	Home	1–2	Beruatto 14'
25 November 2018	Pro Vercelli	Away	0–1	
2 December 2018	Pistoiese	Away	1–0	Di Pardo 2'
9 December 2018	Pisa	Home	1–3	Bunino 66'
12 December 2018	Olbia	Away	1–0	Bunino 90'
16 December 2018	Gozzano	Home	0–0	
23 December 2018	Virtus Entella	Away	0–1	
27 December 2018	Pro Piacenza	Home	3–0	N/A
30 December 2018	Alessandria	Home	1–0	Mavididi 20'
20 January 2019	Carrarese	Home	0–1	
23 January 2019	Cuneo	Away	1–2	Bunino 74'
27 January 2019	Novara	Home	1–1	Kastanos 42'
4 February 2019	Pro Patria	Away	1–2	Mokulu 6'
10 February 2019	Arzachena	Home	1–0	Mokulu 75'
13 February 2019	Arezzo	Away	1–1	Mavididi 14'
17 February 2019	Siena	Away	2–3	Zanimacchia 10', Mavididi 27'
24 February 2019	Lucchese	Home	1–0	Mavididi 32'
2 March 2019	Piacenza	Away	1–2	Kastanos 66'
9 March 2019	Albissola	Home	1–0	Bunino 75' (p)
16 March 2019	Pontedera	Away	0–1	
23 March 2019	Pro Vercelli	Home	3–0	Bunino 38', Zanimacchia 43', Touré 90'+4'
30 March 2019	Pistoiese	Home	0–4	
6 April 2019	Pisa	Away	1–2	Del Prete 29'
13 April 2019	Olbia	Home	2–2	Mokulu 10', 49'
18 April 2019	Gozzano	Away	2–1	Zanimacchia 27', Bunino 44'
27 April 2019	Virtus Entella	Home	0–2	
4 May 2019	Pro Piacenza	Away	3–0 (Note: Pro Piacenza abandoned its sporting activity mid-season. Hence, all its matches were lost 3–0.)	N/A

== Coppa Italia Serie C ==
Date	Opponent	Round	Venue	Result	Scorers
21 August 2018	Cuneo	Group stage	Home	1–0	Zanimacchia 29'
26 August 2018	Albissola	Group stage	Away	2–2	Mavididi 20', Olivieri 68'

== Player stats ==
Player	Position	Apps	Starts	Subs	Goals	Red cards
Mattia Del Favero	GK	23	23	0	0	0
Timothy Nocchi	GK	12	12	0	0	0
Alessandro Busti	GK	1	0	1	0	0
Leonardo Loria	GK	1	1	0	0	0
Simone Muratore	MF	34	26	8	2	0
Luca Zanimacchia	FW	34	21	13	3	0
Idrissa Touré	MF	34	28	6	2	0
Cristian Bunino	FW	34	18	16	9	0
Pietro Beruatto	DF	32	26	6	1	1
Stephy Mavididi	FW	32	21	11	6	0
Grīgorīs Kastanos	MF	29	27	2	3	1
Luca Coccolo	DF	28	21	7	0	0
Lorenzo Del Prete	DF	27	25	2	1	0
Marco Olivieri	FW	25	13	12	0	0
Alessandro Di Pardo	MF	25	19	6	1	0
Gabriele Morelli	DF	24	13	11	0	0
Mattias Andersson	DF	23	21	2	0	1
Matheus Pereira	MF	22	17	5	5	0
Raffaele Alcibiade	DF	18	17	1	0	1
Simone Emmanuello	MF	17	8	9	0	0
Edoardo Masciangelo	DF	13	8	5	0	0
Benjamin Mokulu	FW	13	11	2	4	0
Gianmaria Zanandrea	DF	10	10	0	0	0
Nicolo Pozzebon	FW	9	2	7	0	0
Hans Nicolussi Caviglia	MF	8	4	4	0	0
Leandro Fernandes	MF	5	1	4	0	0
Claudio Zappa	DF	5	1	4	1	0
Manolo Portanova	MF	3	1	2	0	0
Lucas Rosa	DF	2	0	2	0	0
Nicolò Fagioli	MF	1	0	1	0	0
Pablo Moreno	FW	1	0	1	0	0
Kevin Monzialo	FW	1	0	1	0	0
Elia Petrelli	FW	1	0	1	0	0
Cendrim Kameraj	DF	1	0	1	0	0
Nikolai Frederiksen	FW	1	0	1	0	0
