= 2025–26 Juventus Next Gen season =

Juventus Next Gen
2025–26 season
- Manager: Massimo Brambilla
- Stadium: Stadio Giuseppe Moccagatta
- Serie C: 6th
- Coppa Italia Serie C: Second round
| Home colours | Away colours |

The 2025–26 season is the eighth in the history of Juventus Next Gen and the club’s eighth consecutive season in Serie C. In addition to the domestic league, Juventus Next Gen competes in the Coppa Italia Serie C. The season began on 17 August 2025.

== Squad ==
=== Transfers In ===
| Pos. | Player | Transferred from | Fee | Date | Source |
|---|---|---|---|---|---|
| FW | (Italy) Leonardo Cerri | (Italy) Carrarese | Loan return | 30 June 2025 | |
| FW | (Italy) Gianmarco Di Biase | (Italy) Pergolettese | Loan return | 30 June 2025 | |
| MF | (Italy) Mattia Compagnon | (Italy) Catanzaro | Loan return | 30 June 2025 | |
| MF | (Italy) Nicolò Ledonne | (Italy) Giana Erminio | Loan return | 30 June 2025 | |
| MF | (Belgium) Joseph Nonge | (Switzerland) Servette | Loan return | 30 June 2025 | |
| MF | (Italy) Alessandro Sersanti | (Italy) Reggiana | Loan return | 30 June 2025 | |
| DF | (Italy) Lorenzo Villa | (Italy) Pineto | €300,000 | 1 July 2025 | |
| FW | (Italy) Alvin Okoro | (Italy) Venezia | Loan fee: €250k | 15 August 2025 | |

=== Transfers Out ===
| Pos. | Player | Transferred to | Fee | Date | Source |
|---|---|---|---|---|---|
| FW | (Ghana) Felix Afena-Gyan | (Italy) Cremonese | Loan return | 30 June 2025 | |
| FW | (Portugal) Luís Semedo | (England) Sunderland | Loan return | 30 June 2025 | |
| MF | (Greece) Christos Papadopoulos | (Italy) Genoa | Loan return | 30 June 2025 | |
| DF | (Italy) Riccardo Stivanello | (Italy) Bologna | Loan return | 30 June 2025 | |
| GK | (Slovakia) Jakub Vinarčík | (Portugal) Arouca | Undisclosed | 1 July 2025 | |
| FW | (Italy) Nikola Sekulov | (Italy) Sampdoria | €1,500,000 | 1 July 2025 | |
| MF | (Norway) Martin Palumbo | (Italy) Avellino | €1,000,000 | 1 July 2025 | |
| DF | (Bosnia and Herzegovina) Tarik Muharemović | (Italy) Sassuolo Calcio | €3,000,000 | 1 July 2025 | |
| DF | (Italy) Lorenzo Villa | (Italy) Padova | Loan | 2 July 2025 | |
| MF | (Belgium) Joseph Nonge | (Turkey) Kocaelispor | Undisclosed | 5 July 2025 | |
| MF | (Italy) Nicolò Ledonne | (Italy) Novara | Undisclosed | 9 July 2025 | |
| FW | (Italy) Emanuele Pecorino | (Italy) Südtirol | Loan | 11 July 2025 | |
| MF | (Italy) Mattia Compagnon | (Italy) Venezia | Loan | 12 July 2025 | |
| GK | (Italy) Giovanni Daffara | (Italy) Avellino | Loan | 16 July 2025 | |
| MF | (Curaçao) Livano Comenencia | (Switzerland) FC Zürich | Undisclosed | 6 August 2025 | |
| MF | (Italy) Diego Ripani | (Italy) Forlì | Loan | 14 August 2025 | |
| MF | (Italy) Alessandro Pietrelli | (Italy) Venezia | Loan | 16 August 2025 | |
| FW | (Italy) Tommaso Mancini | (Italy) Virtus Verona | Loan | 16 August 2025 | |
| MF | (Italy) Alessandro Sersanti | (Italy) Modena | Loan | 22 August 2025 | |
| FW | (Italy) Gianmarco Di Biase | (Italy) Bra | Undisclosed | 26 August 2025 | |
| FW | (Italy) Leonardo Cerri | (Italy) SSC Bari | Loan | 27 August 2025 | |
| DF | (Italy) Alessandro Nisci | (Switzerland) Sion | Undisclosed | 1 September 2025 | |
| FW | (Croatia) Ivano Srdoč | (Bosnia and Herzegovina) Široki Brijeg | Loan | 1 September 2025 | |
| FW | (Argentina) Juan Ignacio Quattrocchi | (Spain) Tudelano | Loan | 1 September 2025 | |

== Friendlies ==
| 2 August 2025 | Juventus Next Gen | 2–2 | AlbinoLeffe | Vinovo |
| 17:00 | | | | Stadium: Allianz Training Center |

| 8 August 2025 | Juventus Next Gen | 1–5 | Atalanta U23 | Biella |
| | | Report |

| 13 August 2025 | Juventus | 2–0 | Juventus Next Gen | Turin |
| 18:30 | Douglas Luiz 15'; Vlahović 33' | | | Stadium: Juventus Stadium |

== Competitions ==
=== Overall record ===
| Competition | First match | Last match | Starting round | Record | | | | | | | |
| Competition | First match | Last match | Starting round | Pld | W | D | L | GF | GA | GD | Win % |
|---|---|---|---|---|---|---|---|---|---|---|---|
| Serie C | 23 August 2025 | 26 April 2026 | Matchday 1 | 5 | 2 | 2 | 1 | 8 | 7 | +1 | 40.00 |
| Coppa Italia Serie C | 17 August 2025 | | First round | 1 | 1 | 0 | 0 | 1 | 0 | +1 | 100.00 |
| Total | | | | 6 | 3 | 2 | 1 | 9 | 7 | +2 | 50.00 |

Last updated: 20 September 2025
Source: Competitions

=== Serie C ===
Group B

==== Results summary ====
| Overall | | | | | | | | Home | | | | | | Away | | | | | |
| Pld | W | D | L | GF | GA | GD | Pts | W | D | L | GF | GA | GD | W | D | L | GF | GA | GD |
|---|---|---|---|---|---|---|---|---|---|---|---|---|---|---|---|---|---|---|---|
| 5 | 2 | 2 | 1 | 8 | 7 | +1 | 8 | 1 | 0 | 1 | 4 | 4 | 0 | 1 | 2 | 0 | 4 | 3 | +1 |

Last updated: 20 September 2025.

==== Results by round ====
| Round | 1 | 2 | 3 | 4 | 5 | 6 |
|---|---|---|---|---|---|---|
| Ground | A | H | A | H | A | H |
| Result | D | W | D | L | W | |
| Position | 7 | 4 | 7 | 10 | 6 | |

Updated to match(es) played on 20 September 2025. Source:
A = Away; H = Home; W = Win; D = Draw; L = Loss

==== Matches ====
| 23 August 2025 1 | Carpi | 1–1 | Juventus Next Gen | Carpi |
| 18:00 UTC+2 | Cortesi 77' | | Vacca 90+5' | Stadium: Stadio Sandro Cabassi; Attendance: 1,880; Referee: Francesco Zago |

| 30 August 2025 2 | Juventus Next Gen | 2–1 | Livorno | Alessandria |
| 21:00 UTC+2 | Deme 70'; Anghelè 90+4' | | Di Carmine 89' (pen.) | Stadium: Stadio Giuseppe Moccagatta; Attendance: 523; Referee: Lucio Felice Angelillo |

| 6 September 2025 3 | Ascoli | 0–0 | Juventus Next Gen | Ascoli Piceno |
| 17:30 UTC+2 | | | | Stadium: Stadio Cino e Lillo Del Duca; Attendance: 10,009; Referee: Alessandro Recchia |

| 14 September 2025 4 | Juventus Next Gen | 2–3 | Arezzo | Alessandria |
| 12:30 UTC+2 | Turicchia 2'; Turco 26' | | Pattarello 35'; Pedro Felipe 65' (o.g.); Ravasio 90+6' (pen.) | Stadium: Stadio Giuseppe Moccagatta; Attendance: 350; Referee: Michele Maccorin |

| 20 September 2025 5 | Pineto | 2–3 | Juventus Next Gen | Pineto |
| 15:00 UTC+2 | D'Andrea 9'; Bruzzaniti 57' (pen.) | | Puczka 33' (pen.); Okoro 35'; Faticanti 82' | Stadium: Stadio Mimmo Pavone-Alessandro Mariani; Referee: Giuseppe Maria Manzo |

| 23 September 2025 6 | Juventus Next Gen | v | Torres | Alessandria |
| 18:30 UTC+2 | | | | Stadium: Stadio Giuseppe Moccagatta |

=== Coppa Italia Serie C ===
| 17 August 2025 First round | Juventus Next Gen | 1–0 | Novara | Alessandria |
| 18:00 UTC+2 | Guerra 67' | | | Stadium: Stadio Giuseppe Moccagatta; Referee: Michele Pasculli |

| 28 October 2025 Second round | Renate | v | Juventus Next Gen |
| 20:30 UTC+2 |
