= 2024–25 Juventus Next Gen season =

Juventus Next Gen
2024–25 season
- President: Gianluca Ferrero
- Head coach: Paolo Montero (until 12 November 2024); Massimo Brambilla (after 12 November 2024)
- Stadium: Stadio Vittorio Pozzo
- Serie C: 9th, Group C
- Coppa Italia Serie C: First round
- Top goalscorer: League: Simone Guerra (15); All: Simone Guerra (16)
Home colours	Away colours	Third colours
- All statistics correct as of 30 June 2025.

The 2024–25 season was Juventus Next Gen's seventh season in the Serie C, the third level of Italian football. It was their first season competing in Group C after previously competing in Group A and Group B. They also participated in the Coppa Italia Serie C, the Italian cup competition for Serie C sides, and the Serie C play-offs.

== Serie C ==
Results list Juventus Next Gen's goal tally first.

Date	Opponent	Venue	Result	Scorers
23 August 2024	Audace Cerignola	Home	3–4	Palumbo 31', Amaradio 57', Stivanello 90'+4'
30 August 2024	Casertana	Away	3–2	Da Graca 45'+1', Anghelè 54', Papadopoulos 90'+4'
7 September 2024	Catania	Home	1–3	Afena-Gyan 25'
14 September 2024	Monopoli	Away	0–0	
22 September 2024	Trapani	Away	1–1	Guerra 70'
26 September 2024	AZ Picerno	Home	1–1	Cudrig 47'
30 September 2024	Benevento	Away	1–4	Palumbo 45'+2'
5 October 2024	Potenza	Home	2–3	Palumbo 2', Da Graca 67'
12 October 2024	Giugliano	Away	0–1	
20 October 2024	Avellino	Home	0–3	
27 October 2024	Team Altamura	Away	0–2	
31 October 2024	Sorrento	Home	0–1	
3 November 2024	Latina	Home	0–0	
10 November 2024	Foggia	Away	0–1	
24 November 2024	Crotone	Away	1–2	Guerra 45'+1'
8 December 2024	Cavese	Away	1–0	Guerra 68'
14 December 2024	ACR Messina	Home	2–0	Guerra 45'+1', Afena-Gyan 81'
21 December 2024	Audace Cerignola	Away	3–3	Palumbo 27', Afena-Gyan 53', Semedo 90'+4'
4 January 2025	Casertana	Home	1–0	Guerra 57'
12 January 2025	Catania	Away	2–1	Afena-Gyan 13', Semedo 67'
19 January 2025	Monopoli	Home	1–0	Palumbo 45'+1'
26 January 2025	Trapani	Home	2–0	Guerra 43', 79'
2 February 2025	AZ Picerno	Away	1–1	Pietrelli 57'
9 February 2025	Benevento	Home	2–0	Guerra 54', Adžić 90'+2'
16 February 2025	Potenza	Away	1–1	Afena-Gyan 67'
22 February 2025	Giugliano	Home	0–0	
2 March 2025	Avellino	Away	1–2	Guerra 57'
9 March 2025	Team Altamura	Home	1–2	Pietrelli 62'
12 March 2025	Sorrento	Away	1–0	Adžić 58'
16 March 2025	Latina	Away	2–3	Turicchia 25', Guerra 83'
22 March 2025	Foggia	Home	2–0	Afena-Gyan 31', Amaradio 45'+1'
5 April 2025	Crotone	Home	4–1	Adžić 24' (pen.), 73', Pietrelli 40', Guerra 89' (pen.)
19 April 2025	Cavese	Home	3–1	Guerra 21', 45'+2', Cudrig 76'
27 April 2025	ACR Messina	Away	1–2	Amaradio 63'

== Serie C play-offs ==
Results list Juventus Next Gen's goal tally first.

Date	Opponent	Venue	Result	Scorers
4 May 2025	Benevento	Away	5–1	Guerra 10', 51', Cudrig 55', 68', Pietrelli 82'
7 May 2025	Crotone	Away	0–0	

== Coppa Italia Serie C ==
Results list Juventus Next Gen's goal tally first.

Date	Opponent	Venue	Result	Scorers
11 August 2024	Giana Erminio	Away	1–2	Guerra 79'
