= Augusto Owusu =

Association football player (born 2005)

Personal information
- Full name: Augusto Seedorf Owusu
- Date of birth: 28 January 2005 (age 21)
- Place of birth: Turin, Italy
- Height: 1.89 m (6 ft 2 in)
- Position: Midfielder

Team information
- Current team: Juventus
- Number: 41

Youth career
- 2015–2024: Juventus
- 2022–2023: → Reggiana (loan)

Senior career*
Years	Team	Apps	(Gls)
2024–	Juventus Next Gen	48	(0)
2026–	Juventus	0	(0)
- * Club domestic league appearances and goals as of 21:15, 20 September 2026 (UTC)

Augusto Seedorf Owusu (born 28 January 2005) is a professional footballer who plays as a midfielder for Serie A club Juventus. Born in Italy, he is a dual citizen of Italy and Ghana.

== Career ==
A native of Turin, he was discovered by a Juventus scout while playing in a club in the suburbs of his native city at the age of eight. He moved up across Juventus youth categories until 2022, when he was loaned to Reggiana for twelve months, playing in their Primavera team. In 2023, he was reportedly close to leaving the Bianconeri. In December 2024, he was called up by first-team manager Thiago Motta for the upcoming away match against Lecce. In 2025–26, he collected 26 appearances for reserve team Juventus Next Gen. In the summer of 2026, Owusu took part in first-team friendlies, called up by coach Luciano Spalletti. He was reported to be loaned out to Serie B but he was ultimately assigned to Juventus Next Gen after Spalletti insisted he stay. After another call-up from Spalletti for a match against Sassuolo, he made his first-team debut for Juventus coming on as a substitute in a 5–0 home UEFA Europa League victory against NEC.

== Personal life ==
A player of Ghanaian origin, he was named after former AC Milan midfielder Clarence Seedorf by his father. He holds both Italian and Ghanaian nationalities.

== Style of play ==
He is a physical defensive midfielder.

== Career statistics ==
As of 20 September 2026

Club	Season	League			National cup		Continental		Other		Total	
Club	Season	Division	Apps	Goals	Apps	Goals	Apps	Goals	Apps	Goals	Apps	Goals
Juventus Next Gen	2024–25	Serie C	19	0	-		-		2 (Note: 1 appearance in Serie C play-offs and 1 appearance in Coppa Italia Serie C.)	0	21	0
Juventus Next Gen	2025–26	Serie C	26	0	-		-		3 (Note: 2 appearances in Coppa Italia Serie C and 1 appearance in Serie C play-offs.)	0	29	0
Juventus Next Gen	2026–27	Serie C	3	0	-		-		1 (Note: Appearances in Serie C play-offs.)	0	4	0
Juventus Next Gen	Total		48	0	0	0	0	0	6	0	54	0
Juventus	2026–27	Serie A	0	0	-		1 (Note: Appearances in UEFA Europa League.)	0	-		1	0
Career total			48	0	0	0	1	0	6	0	55	0
