= Javier Gil (footballer) =

Spanish footballer (born 2006)

Javi Gil
Personal information
- Full name: Javier Gil Puche
- Date of birth: 3 May 2006 (age 20)
- Place of birth: Molina de Segura, Spain
- Height: 1.92 m (6 ft 4 in)
- Position: Defender

Team information
- Current team: Atlético Madrid B (on loan from Juventus Next Gen)
- Number: 3

Youth career
- –2021: Murcia
- 2021–2023: Alavés
- 2023–2024: Juventus

Senior career*
Years	Team	Apps	(Gls)
2024–	Juventus Next Gen	44	(1)
2024–	Juventus	0	(0)
2026–	→ Atlético Madrid B (loan)	0	(0)

International career^{‡}
2024–	Spain U19	1	(0)
- * Club domestic league appearances and goals as of 30 April 2026 ‡ National team caps and goals as of 6 November 2024

Javier Gil Puche (born 3 May 2006) is a Spanish professional footballer who plays as a defender for club Atlético Madrileño, on loan from Serie C Group B club Juventus Next Gen.

== Club career ==
As a youth player, he joined the youth academy of Spanish side Real Murcia. In 2021, he joined the youth academy of Spanish side Alavés. In 2023, he joined the youth academy of Serie A side Juventus. On 30 September 2024, Gil made his debut for Juventus Next Gen—the reserve team of Juventus. In October, he was first called-up to the first team by head coach Thiago Motta for a Serie A match against Parma. In February 2025, he renewed his contract with Juventus until June 2028.

== International career ==
He is a Spain youth international. On 12 October 2024, he debuted for a Spain national under-19 football team during a 3–2 win over the Norway national under-19 football team.

== Style of play ==
Gil is a 1.91m-tall central defender. He is left-footed. He is known for his strength. He is also known for his technical ability.

== Career statistics ==
=== Club ===
As of match played 21 March 2026

Appearances and goals by club, season and competition
Club	Season	League			Coppa Italia		Cotninental		Other		Total	
Club	Season	Division	Apps	Goals	Apps	Goals	Apps	Goals	Apps	Goals	Apps	Goals
Juventus Next Gen	2024–25	Serie C	20	0	—		—		1 (Note: Appearance(s) in Serie C play-offs)	0	21	0
Juventus Next Gen	2025–26	Serie C	20	1	—		—		0	0	20	1
Juventus Next Gen	Total		40	1	—		—		1	0	41	1
Juventus	2024–25	Serie A	0	0	0	0	0	0	0	0	0	0
Juventus	2025–26	Serie A	0	0	0	0	0	0	—		0	0
Juventus	Total		0	0	0	0	0	0	0	0	0	0
Career total			40	1	0	0	0	0	1	0	41	1
