= Patryk Mazur =

Polish footballer (born 2007)

Personal information
- Date of birth: 25 January 2007 (age 19)
- Place of birth: Poland
- Position: Midfielder

Team information
- Current team: Juventus Next Gen
- Number: 24

Youth career
- 2015–2018: Lublinianka
- 2018–2020: BKS Lublin
- 2020–2023: Stal Rzeszów
- 2023–: Juventus

Senior career*
| Years | Team | Apps | (Gls) |
| 2023 | Stal Rzeszów | 2 | (0) |
| 2025– | Juventus Next Gen | 16 | (0) |

International career^{‡}
| 2021 | Poland U15 | 3 | (0) |
| 2022–2023 | Poland U16 | 3 | (0) |
| 2023–2024 | Poland U17 | 5 | (2) |
| 2023 | Poland U18 | 2 | (0) |
- * Club domestic league appearances and goals as of 30 April 2026 ‡ National team caps and goals as of 21:20, 5 April 2024 (UTC)

Patryk Mazur (born 25 January 2007) is a Polish professional footballer who plays as a midfielder for Serie C Group B side Juventus Next Gen, the reserve team of Serie A club Juventus.

== Club career ==
Mazur came through the Stal Rzeszów Football Academy. On 13 August 2023, he made his professional debut for Stal in a 2–3 league loss to Arka Gdynia. Later that month he joined Italian side Juventus, signing until 2026. He went into the Juventus youth team but trained with the first team on occasion before the end of the year.

== International career ==
He has represented Poland at youth level and made his debut for Poland U17 in August 2023, and scored against Wales. That month he scored two goals in three matches for the under-17 side.

== Style of play ==
He has been described as "technically gifted" by former Juventus head of scouting Matteo Tognozzi.

== Career statistics ==
As of match played 26 April 2026

Appearances and goals by club, season and competition
| Club | Season | League | | | National cup (Note: Includes Polish Cup) | | Europe | | Other | | Total | |
| Club | Season | Division | Apps | Goals | Apps | Goals | Apps | Goals | Apps | Goals | Apps | Goals |
|---|---|---|---|---|---|---|---|---|---|---|---|---|
| Stal Rzeszów | 2023–24 | I liga | 2 | 0 | — | | — | | — | | 2 | 0 |
| Juventus Next Gen | 2025–26 | Serie C Group B | 16 | 0 | — | | — | | 1 (Note: Appearance in Coppa Italia Serie C) | 0 | 17 | 0 |
| Career total | | | 18 | 0 | 0 | 0 | 0 | 0 | 1 | 0 | 19 | 0 |
