= Alfonso Montero =

Uruguayan footballer (born 2007)

Personal information
- Full name: Alfonso Montero Benia
- Date of birth: 23 February 2007 (age 19)
- Place of birth: Montevideo, Uruguay
- Height: 1.85 m (6 ft 1 in)
- Position: Defender

Team information
- Current team: Juventus Next Gen
- Number: 44

Youth career
- La Escalinata
- 2021–2023: Defensor Sporting
- 2023–2026: Juventus

Senior career*
Years	Team	Apps	(Gls)
2026–	Juventus Next Gen	6	(0)

International career^{‡}
2022	Uruguay U17	4	(0)
2024–	Uruguay U20	13	(0)
- * Club domestic league appearances and goals as of 14:34, 20 September 2026 (UTC) ‡ National team caps and goals as of 17 February 2025

Alfonso Montero Benia (born 23 February 2007) is an Uruguayan professional footballer who plays as a defender for Serie C Group B club Juventus Next Gen.

== Early and personal life ==
Montero was born in Montevideo, Uruguay to former Uruguay international footballer Paolo Montero. He is the grandson of fellow Uruguayan international Julio Montero Castillo.

== Club career ==
Montero began his career with local Montevideo-based side La Escalinata before joining professional club Defensor Sporting at the end of the 2020 season. In February 2023, Montero moved to Serie A club Juventus, the club his father had captained during his time as a player. In September of the same year, he signed his first professional contract, keeping him with the club until 2026.

In early 2023, he joined Juventus' youth set-up, chosen by his father who had become Juventus U19 coach months earlier. At the age of sixteen, he made his debut for Juventus' Primavera (under-19) sid on 4 February 2024. On 15 October 2024, he was named by English newspaper The Guardian as one of the best players born in 2007 worldwide. On 1 December, he was called up by first-team coach Thiago Motta for the upcoming away match against Lecce. On 7 August 2026, he renewed his contract with Juventus until 2028.

Montero made his debut for Juventus Next Gen on 16 August in a Coppa Italia Serie C match drawn 1–1 against Forlì: Juventus NG would later lose on penalties.

== International career ==
Montero was called up to the Uruguay under-17 side for the first time in August 2022. He was called up again for the 2023 South American U-17 Championship, though did not feature as Uruguay were knocked out in the first stage.

In January 2025, Montero was named in Uruguay's 23-man squad for the 2025 South American U-20 Championship.

== Career statistics ==
=== Club ===
As of match played 20 September 2026

Club	Season	League			National cup		Continental		Other		Total	
Club	Season	Division	Apps	Goals	Apps	Goals	Apps	Goals	Apps	Goals	Apps	Goals
Juventus Next Gen	2026–27	Serie C	6	0	—		—		1	0	7	0
Career total			6	0	0	0	0	0	1	0	7	0
