= Cendrim Kameraj =

Swiss footballer (born 1999)

Personal information
- Date of birth: 13 March 1999 (age 27)
- Place of birth: Lucerne, Switzerland
- Height: 1.80 m (5 ft 11 in)
- Position: Right back

Youth career
- 2005–2009: Ebikon
- 2009–2017: Luzern
- 2017–2018: Juventus

Senior career*
Years	Team	Apps	(Gls)
2018–2019	Juventus U23	1	(0)
2019–2021	Lugano	0	(0)
2019	Team Ticino U21	5	(2)
2022	Kriens	11	(0)
2022–2024	Dukagjini	17	(0)
2024	Zug 94	1	(0)

International career^{‡}
2015–2016	Switzerland U17	10	(2)
2016–2017	Switzerland U18	2	(1)
2017	Switzerland U19	1	(0)
2019	Kosovo U21	1	(0)
- * Club domestic league appearances and goals as of 2 August 2023 ‡ National team caps and goals as of 15 November 2019

Cendrim Kameraj (Albanian definite form: Çëndrim Kameraj; also known as Qëndrim Kameraj; born 13 March 1999) is a professional footballer who last played for Kosovan club Dukagjini. Born in Switzerland, Kameraj also represented Kosovo internationally at the youth level.

== Club career ==
He made his Serie C debut for Juventus U23 on 27 September 2018 in a game against Cuneo.

On 26 January 2019, Kameraj joined Swiss club Lugano until 30 June 2021.

On 27 January 2022, Kameraj signed with Kriens.

On 10 August 2022, Kameraj signed with Dukagjini in Kosovo.

== International career ==
Kameraj was born in Switzerland and is of Kosovo Albanian descent. Kameraj represented Switzerland as a youth international, before switching to represent Kosovo in 2019.
