= Lorenzo Del Prete =

Italian footballer (born 1986)

Personal information
- Date of birth: 12 January 1986 (age 40)
- Place of birth: Rome, Italy
- Height: 1.80 m (5 ft 11 in)
- Position: Right back

Youth career
- Monterotondo
- 2002–2006: Juventus

Senior career*
Years	Team	Apps	(Gls)
2006–2008	Juventus	0	(0)
2006–2007	→ Pizzighettone (loan)	26	(0)
2007–2008	→ Lanciano (loan)	27	(0)
2008–2012	Siena	5	(0)
2009–2010	→ Frosinone (loan)	31	(0)
2010–2011	→ Pescara (loan)	14	(0)
2011–2012	→ Nocerina (loan)	9	(1)
2012–2014	Novara	15	(0)
2013–2014	→ Crotone (loan)	58	(1)
2014–2015	Perugia	17	(2)
2015	Catania	9	(0)
2015–2018	Perugia	56	(4)
2018–2019	Juventus U23	27	(1)
2019–2020	Trapani	15	(0)
2020–2021	Foggia	15	(1)
2022	Novara	1	(0)
- * Club domestic league appearances and goals as of 15 May 2022

Lorenzo Del Prete (born 12 January 1986) is an Italian footballer who plays as a right back.

== Career ==
=== Juventus ===
After an experience with the Juventus youth system, Del Prete was loaned out to Pizzighettone and Lanciano to gain experience through first team playing time in the lower divisions of the Italian league.

=== Siena ===
After some impressive performances Juventus opted to sell him in a co-ownership deal on 8 July 2008 to Serie A side Siena for €130,000, (Note: Based on 50% of the contract residual value on 30 June 2008, €11,000, and the profit that Juventus disclosed in 2008–09 financial report, €119,000) so he could gain experience at the highest level. He made his Serie A debut on the first day of the 2008–09 season in a defeat to Atalanta. His debut also activated the bonus clause regulated by FIGC, which Siena had to pay €18,000 per year to Monterotondo as Premio alla carriera. (Note: Siena disclosed that the club had paid €180,000 in total to the former clubs of Del Prete, Belmonte and Zito. However the breakdown of the payment which worth 10 season of services was unknown; Regulated by Article 99bis of N.O.I.F., Once the players had made his Serie A debut or U21 debut, the professional clubs had to pay the Premio alla carriera to youth and amateur club that the players had registered as "youth" giovane or "young amateur" (giovane dilettante).) In June 2009 Siena bought him outright for another €130,000. (Note: Based on 50% of the contract residual value on 30 June 2008, €11,000, and the profit that Juventus disclosed in 2009–10 financial report, €119,000) Del Prete was signed by Frosinone in July 2009 along with Caetano Calil. On 15 July 2010 he was signed by Pescara. Circa 2010 Del Prete also renewed his contract to 30 June 2014.

In 2011 Del Prete returned to Siena for their pre-season camp. He also received no.32 shirt before he left the club again on 30 August 2011. Nocerina also received €10,000 performance bonus (Italian: premi di valorizzazione) from Siena for the loan.

=== Novara ===
On 20 July 2012, Del Prete was sold to Novara for €600,000 in a 4-year contract. On the same time Siena signed Massimo Paci also for €600,000. On 22 January 2013 Del Prete was signed by Crotone in temporary deal. On 11 July 2013 the deal was renewed.

=== Perugia ===
On 18 July 2014, Del Prete was signed by Serie B newcomer Perugia.

=== Catania ===
On 2 February 2015, Del Prete left for fellow second division club Catania in a 3 1/2-year contract.

=== Juventus U23 ===
On 9 October 2018, Del Prete joined Serie C side Juventus U23.

=== Trapani ===
On 16 August 2019, he signed a 2-year contract with Trapani.

=== Return to Novara ===
On 1 April 2022, Del Prete returned to Novara in Serie D until the end of the season. After making a 5-minute substitute appearance two days later, he was not included in the matchday squad for the rest of the season.
