= Jakub Vinarčík =

Slovak footballer (born 2005)

Personal information
- Date of birth: 11 July 2005 (age 21)
- Place of birth: Košice, Slovakia
- Height: 2.02 m (6 ft 8 in)
- Position: Goalkeeper

Youth career
- –2021: Košice
- 2021–2025: Juventus

Senior career*
Years	Team	Apps	(Gls)
2022–2025	Juventus Next Gen	0	(0)
2025	→ Arouca (loan)	0	(0)
2025–	Arouca	1	(0)

International career^{‡}
2022	Slovakia U17	3	(0)
2022	Slovakia U18	3	(0)
2024	Slovakia U19	1	(0)
- * Club domestic league appearances and goals as of 29 August 2026 ‡ National team caps and goals as of 07:20, 28 April 2026 (UTC)

Jakub Vinarčík (born 11 July 2005) is a Slovak footballer who plays for Primeira Liga side Arouca as a goalkeeper. He represents Slovakia at youth level.

== Early life ==
Vinarcik was born in the city of Košice in Slovakia, where he first started playing football in the youth categories of FC Lokomotíva Košice. He later moved to rivals, FC Košice. By decision of the youth sports director Miroslav Guz, Vinarcik was promoted to the U19 team at the beginning of the 2020/2021 season, despite being only 15 years old. In the summer of 2021, he transferred to the under-16 category of Juventus FC, signing a contract until 2024. In 2025, he went on a half-year loan to Primeira Liga side F.C. Arouca.

== Club career ==
=== Arouca ===
In 2025, Vinarcik returned to his former club, Arouca. After the club's number one goalkeeper Ignacio De Arruabarrena received a yellow card in stoppage time of his previous match, being suspended for the next league match, Vinarcik made his debut on 12 April 2026, starting in a 1–0 league loss away to S.C. Braga. He became the 13th Slovak player to play a match in the Portuguese first league.

== International career ==
Vinarcik received his first international call-up in April 2021, being nominated as a back-up for the Slovakia national under-16 football team ahead of training in Šamorín. In March 2022, he was nominated for the Slovakia national under-17 football team for the second round of qualification to the U17 Euros against the Netherlands. He would feature in a 1–1 draw against the Dutch.
