= Alessandro Pietrelli =

Italian footballer (born 2003)

Personal information
- Date of birth: 5 January 2003 (age 23)
- Place of birth: Bologna, Italy
- Height: 1.94 m (6 ft 4 in)
- Position: Attacking midfielder

Team information
- Current team: Vicenza (on loan from Juventus)
- Number: 99

Youth career
- Fano
- –2018: Cesena
- 2018–2022: Bologna

Senior career*
Years	Team	Apps	(Gls)
2022–2025	Feralpisalò	54	(6)
2025	→ Juventus (loan)	0	(0)
2025	→ Juventus Next Gen (res.) (loan)	13	(3)
2025–	Juventus	0	(0)
2025–2026	→ Venezia (loan)	9	(0)
2026–	→ Vicenza (loan)	1	(1)
- * Club domestic league appearances and goals as of 21 August 2026

Alessandro Pietrelli (born 5 January 2003) is an Italian professional footballer who plays as an attacking midfielder for Serie B club Vicenza, on loan from Juventus.

== Club career ==
=== Early career ===
Born in Bologna, Pietrelli made his first steps in football with Fano, before moving to Cesena's youth set-up. Aged 15, he returned to his hometown to join Bologna's youth sector, where he remained until 2022.

=== Feralpisalò ===
On 2022, he moved to Feralpisalò. He made 57 appearances and he scored six goals across Serie B and Serie C with the Lombard team. In 2024–25, he scored five goals in 21 matches in the first half of the season with Feralpisalò.

=== Juventus ===
On 22 January 2025, Pietrelli was loaned to Juventus who sent them to play with their Next Gen team with option to buy and obbligation in certain cases. He made his Juventus Next Gen debut on the following 24 January in a victory against Trapani. A week later, he made his first start, and also scored his first goal with Juventus Next Gen, in a match drawn 1–1 against AZ Picerno. On 26 February, he was called up by first-team coach Thiago Motta for a Coppa Italia match against Empoli.

==== Loan to Venezia ====
On 16 August 2025, Pietrelli moved on loan to Venezia, with an option to buy.

== Style of playing ==
Pietrelli is a 1.94 m tall offensive midfielder, who can also play as a second-forward or as a right winger. Thanks to his versatility, Pietrelli proved to be a key figure in Next Gen coach Massimo Brambilla's tactical system.

== Career statistics ==
=== Club ===
As of match played 9 May 2025

Appearances and goals by club, season and competition
Club	Season	League			Coppa Italia		Other		Total	
Club	Season	Division	Apps	Goals	Apps	Goals	Apps	Goals	Apps	Goals
Feralpisalò	2022–23	Serie C	18	0	1	0	0	0	19	1
Feralpisalò	2023–24	Serie B	15	1	—		0	0	15	0
Feralpisalò	2024–25	Serie C	21	5	—		0	1	21	4
Feralpisalò	Total		54	6	1	0	0	0	63	13
Juventus Next Gen (loan)	2024–25	Serie C	13	3	—		2 (Note: Appearances in Serie C promotion play-offs.)	1	14	4
Career total			67	9	1	0	21	1	77	17
