= Marco Olivieri =

Italian footballer (born 1999)

Personal information
- Full name: Marco Olivieri
- Date of birth: 30 June 1999 (age 27)
- Place of birth: Porto Sant'Elpidio, Italy
- Height: 1.77 m (5 ft 10 in)
- Position: Forward

Team information
- Current team: Arezzo (on loan from Cesena)
- Number: 99

Youth career
- 2009–2013: Ascoli
- 2013–2014: Siena
- 2014–2018: Empoli

Senior career*
Years	Team	Apps	(Gls)
2018–2019	Empoli	0	(0)
2018–2019	→ Juventus U23 (loan)	25	(0)
2019–2020	Juventus U23	22	(4)
2019–2024	Juventus	3	(0)
2020–2021	→ Empoli (loan)	29	(5)
2021–2022	→ Lecce (loan)	18	(0)
2022–2023	→ Perugia (loan)	42	(7)
2023–2024	→ Venezia (loan)	20	(0)
2024–2025	Triestina	26	(10)
2025–	Cesena	26	(1)
2026–	→ Arezzo (loan)	2	(0)

International career^{‡}
2014–2015	Italy U16	5	(1)
2015–2016	Italy U17	18	(3)
2016–2017	Italy U18	6	(1)
2017–2018	Italy U19	7	(3)
2019	Italy U20	14	(2)
- * Club domestic league appearances and goals as of 20 September 2026 ‡ National team caps and goals as of 27 March 2019

Marco Olivieri (born 30 June 1999) is an Italian professional footballer who plays as a forward for Serie B club Arezzo, on loan from Cesena.

== Club career ==
Olivieri is a product of Empoli's youth setup, playing for their under-19 squad in the 2015–16 season. He made his first bench appearance for Empoli's senior squad on 5 August 2017, in a 2017–18 Coppa Italia game against Renate. On 26 August 2017, Olivieri joined Juventus on loan. He played for their under-19 squad in the 2017–18 UEFA Youth League.

The forward made his Serie C debut for Juventus U23 on 30 September 2018, in a game against Novara as an 83rd-minute substitute for Matheus Pereira. At the end of the season, Juventus redeemed the €1 million buying option they had secured when they loaned him.

He made his Serie A and senior club debut for Juventus on 30 June 2020, coming on as a late second-half substitute for Paulo Dybala in a 3–1 away win over Genoa. He made his Champions League debut on 7 August, coming on as a substitute for the injured Paulo Dybala in a 2–1 home win over Lyon in the second leg of the round of 16 of the competition; the result saw Juventus eliminated from the competition on away goals, following a 2–2 draw on aggregate.

On 9 September 2020 he returned to Empoli in Serie B on loan.

On 22 June 2021, he joined Lecce on loan.

On 29 January 2022, he moved on a one-and-a-half year loan to Perugia, with an option to buy and a conditional obligation to buy.

On 18 August 2023, Olivieri moved on a new loan to Venezia, with an option to buy and a conditional obligation to buy.

On 30 August 2024, Olivieri signed a three-year contract with Triestina in Serie C.

On 20 August 2025, he moved to Cesena in Serie B, on a three-season deal.

== International career ==
Olivieri was first called up to represent his country in 2014, for Italy national under-16 football team friendlies. He represented the under-17 squad at the 2016 UEFA European Under-17 Championship, scoring one goal, as Italy did not advance from the group stage. Olivieri then represented the under-18, under-19, and under-20 squads, all in friendlies.

== Style of play ==
A former centre-forward, tactically, Olivieri usually plays as a left winger, a position which allows him to cut inside and shoot on goal with his stronger right foot. He is known for his eye for goal, and also possesses a good physique, despite his relatively modest height of 1.77 m.

== Career statistics ==
As of match played 22 October 2023

Club	Season	League	League		Cup^{1}		Europe^{2}		Other Cups^{3}		Total	
Club	Season	League	Apps	Goals	Apps	Goals	Apps	Goals	Apps	Goals	Apps	Goals
Juventus U23 (loan)	2018–19	Serie C	25	0	2 (Note: Appearances in Coppa Italia Serie C)	1	—		—		27	1
Juventus U23	2019–20	Serie C	22	4	5	0	—		—		27	4
Juventus U23	Total		47	4	7	1	—		—		54	5
Juventus	2019–20	Serie A	3	0	0	0	1	0	0	0	4	0
Empoli (loan)	2020–21	Serie B	29	5	2	1	—		—		31	6
Lecce (loan)	2021–22	Serie B	18	0	3	0	—		—		21	0
Perugia (loan)	2021–22	Serie B	17	5	—		—		1 (Note: Appearances in Serie B – Promotion play-offs)	0	18	5
Perugia (loan)	2022–23	Serie B	25	2	0	0	—		—		25	2
Perugia (loan)	Total		42	7	0	0	—		1	0	43	7
Venezia (loan)	2023–24	Serie B	4	0	0	0	—		—		4	0
Career total			143	16	12	2	1	0	1	0	157	18

== Honours ==
Juventus U23

- Coppa Italia Serie C: 2019–20

Juventus

- Serie A: 2019–20

Empoli

- Serie B: 2020–21
