= Abdou-Salam Konaté =

Senegalese footballer (born 2006)

Personal information
- Date of birth: 25 November 2006 (age 19)
- Place of birth: Le Blanc-Mesnil, France
- Height: 1.89 m (6 ft 2 in)
- Position: Midfielder

Team information
- Current team: Parma
- Number: 47

Youth career
- –2022: Espérance Aulnaysienne
- 2023–: Parma

Senior career*
Years	Team	Apps	(Gls)
2026–	Parma	2	(0)

International career^{‡}
2023	Senegal U17	4	(0)
- * Club domestic league appearances and goals as of 28 October 2026 ‡ National team caps and goals as of 19 May 2023

Abdou-Salam Konaté (born 25 November 2006) is a professional footballer who plays as a midfielder for Parma. Born in France, he is a Senegal youth international.

== Early life ==
Konaté was born on 25 November 2006. Born in Le Blanc-Mesnil, France, he has four sisters and two brothers.

== Club career ==
As a youth player, Konaté joined the youth academy of French side Espérance Aulnaysienne. Following his stint there, he joined the youth academy of Italian outfit Parma in 2023 and was promoted to the club's senior team in 2025. On 14 August 2026, he debuted for them during a 2–0 home win over Catania in the Coppa Italia.

== International career ==
Konaté is a Senegal youth international and has represent the country internationally at under-17 level and is eligible to represent France internationally having been born in the country.

During April and May 2023, he played for the Senegal national under-17 football team at the 2023 U-17 Africa Cup of Nations. Altogether, he made four appearances and scored zero goals while playing for the Senegal national under-17 football team.

== Style of play ==
Konaté plays as a midfielder and is right-footed. Italian news website MondoPrimavera wrote in 2026 that he "is a natural central midfielder, capable of operating as either a defensive midfielder or a defensive arm. Standing 1.89 m tall and right-footed, he combines an imposing physique with the ability to create a powerful playmaker: he plays a simple, few-touch game, displaying a natural ability to receive the ball under pressure and then distribute it first-time".
