= Diego Pugno =

Italian footballer (born 2006)

Personal information
- Date of birth: 7 July 2006 (age 20)
- Place of birth: Borgaro, Italy
- Height: 1.74 m (5 ft 9 in)
- Position: Forward

Team information
- Current team: Jong Ajax (on loan from Juventus)

Youth career
- 2017–2019: Torino
- 2019–2021: Borgaro
- 2021–2024: Juventus

Senior career*
Years	Team	Apps	(Gls)
2024–	Juventus Next Gen	8	(1)
2024–	Juventus	1	(0)
2026–	→ Jong Ajax (loan)	11	(6)

International career^{‡}
2026–	Italy U20	1	(0)
- * Club domestic league appearances and goals as of 6 November 2026 ‡ National team caps and goals as of 12 November 2026

Diego Pugno (born 7 July 2006) is an Italian professional footballer who plays as a forward for Eerste Divisie club Jong Ajax, on loan from Serie A club Juventus.

== Club career ==
=== Juventus ===
A product of the youth academy of Torino and subsequently Borgaro, Pugno joined the youth academy of Juventus on 3 August 2021. On 14 September 2023, he signed his first professional contract with Juventus until 2026. After impressing with the Primavera squad, he began training with the senior team and made his senior and professional debut as a substitute in a 1–1 Serie A draw against Lecce on 1 December 2024. He subsequently featured for Juventus Next Gen in Serie C.

==== Loan to Ajax ====
On 20 July 2026, Pugno moved abroad to the Netherlands, joining Eredivisie club Ajax on loan for the 2026–27 season with an option to buy, initially slotting into the Jong Ajax squad in the Eerste Divisie.

== Playing style ==
Praised for his technical abilities and tactical intelligence, Pugno operates primarily as a forward capable of converting chances from both inside and outside the penalty area.

== Career stats ==
Appearances and goals by club, season and competition
Club	Season	League			Coppa Italia		Other		Total	
Club	Season	Division	Apps	Goals	Apps	Goals	Apps	Goals	Apps	Goals
Juventus	2024–25	Serie A	1	0	0	0	—		1	0
Juventus Next Gen	2025–26	Serie C	8	1	—		1 (Note: Appearances in the Coppa Italia Serie C)	1	9	2
Jong Ajax	2026–27	Eerste Divisie	7	4	—		—		7	4
Career total			16	5	1	1	0	0	17	6
