= Ivano Srdoč =

Croatian footballer (born 2005)

Personal information
- Date of birth: 8 May 2005 (age 21)
- Place of birth: Rijeka, Croatia
- Height: 1.82 m (6 ft 0 in)
- Position: Striker

Team information
- Current team: Sion

Youth career
- –2022: Rijeka
- 2022–2025: Juventus

Senior career*
| Years | Team | Apps | (Gls) |
| 2025–2026 | Juventus Next Gen | 0 | (0) |
| 2025–2026 | → Široki Brijeg (loan) | 2 | (0) |
| 2026– | Sion | 0 | (0) |
| 2026– | Sion U21 | 0 | (0) |
- * Club domestic league appearances and goals as of 2 September 2026

Ivano Srdoč (born 8 May 2005) is a Croatian footballer who plays as a striker for Swiss Super League club Sion.

== Early life ==
He attended Italian Secondary School in Croatia.

== Club career ==
=== Early career ===
As a youth player, he joined the youth academy of Croatian side Rijeka. In 2022, he joined the youth academy of Italian side Juventus.

==== Loan to Široki Brijeg ====
On 1 September 2025, Srdoč was loaned out to Bosnian Premier League club Široki Brijeg for the 2025–26 season.

=== Sion ===
On 2 September 2026, he joined Swiss Super League club Sion permanently.

== International career ==
He has represented Croatia internationally at youth level.

== Style of play ==
He mainly operates as a striker. He has received comparisons to Wales international Gareth Bale.

== Personal life ==
He played tennis as a child.
