= Luca Zanimacchia =

Italian footballer (born 1998)

Personal information
- Date of birth: 19 July 1998 (age 28)
- Place of birth: Desio, Italy
- Height: 1.78 m (5 ft 10 in)
- Position: Winger

Team information
- Current team: Padova

Youth career
- 2004–2011: Nova Milanese
- 2014–2015: Varese
- 2016–2018: Genoa

Senior career*
| Years | Team | Apps | (Gls) |
| 2015–2016 | Legnago Salus | 22 | (5) |
| 2018–2019 | Genoa | 0 | (0) |
| 2018–2019 | → Juventus U23 (loan) | 36 | (4) |
| 2019–2022 | Juventus U23 | 33 | (6) |
| 2020–2021 | → Zaragoza (loan) | 28 | (2) |
| 2021–2022 | → Cremonese (loan) | 37 | (8) |
| 2022–2026 | Cremonese | 81 | (3) |
| 2023 | → Parma (loan) | 18 | (1) |
| 2025–2026 | → Modena (loan) | 36 | (3) |
| 2026– | Padova | 0 | (0) |

International career
| 2016–2017 | Italy U19 | 7 | (0) |
- * Club domestic league appearances and goals as of 10 May 2026

Luca Zanimacchia (born 19 July 1998) is an Italian professional footballer who plays as a right winger for Serie B club Padova.

== Club career ==
In August 2018, Zanimacchia was aggregated to Juventus U23 for the whole season. Zanimacchia made his debut for Juventus U23 in a 1–0 victory against Cuneo, in which he scored the first goal of Juventus U23's history. He made his Serie C debut for Juventus U23 on 16 September 2018 in a game against Alessandria. Juventus later redeemed the buying option of the player, after a good season where he had played 34 games and scored three goals.

He made his Serie A debut, as well as his Juventus senior debut, in a 2–0 away defeat to Cagliari on 29 July 2020. On 1 September, he was loaned to the Spanish Segunda División side Real Zaragoza for the 2020–21 season, with a buyout clause.

On 9 July 2021 he joined Cremonese on loan. On 4 July 2022, he returned to the Cremona team on loan with an obligation to buy.

On 29 January 2023, Zanimacchia was loaned by Cremonese to Parma, with an option to buy and a buy-back option for Cremonese.

On 7 August 2025, he moved on loan to Modena, with an option to buy and a conditional obligation to buy.

On 7 July 2026, Zanimacchia signed a three-season contract with Padova in Serie B.

== Career statistics ==
As of match played 19 August 2022

Appearances and goals by club, season and competition
| Club | Season | League | League | | National cup^{1} | | Europe^{2} | | Total | |
| Club | Season | League | Apps | Goals | Apps | Goals | Apps | Goals | Apps | Goals |
|---|---|---|---|---|---|---|---|---|---|---|
| Genoa | 2016–17 | Serie A | 0 | 0 | 0 | 0 | — | | 0 | 0 |
| Genoa | 2017–18 | Serie A | 0 | 0 | 0 | 0 | — | | 0 | 0 |
| Genoa | Total | | 0 | 0 | 0 | 0 | — | | 0 | 0 |
| Juventus U23 | 2018–19 | Serie C | 34 | 3 | 0 | 0 | — | | 34 | 3 |
| Juventus U23 | 2019–20 | Serie C | 25 | 4 | 0 | 0 | — | | 25 | 4 |
| Juventus U23 | Total | | 59 | 7 | 0 | 0 | — | | 59 | 7 |
| Juventus | 2019–20 | Serie A | 2 | 0 | 0 | 0 | 0 | 0 | 2 | 0 |
| Real Zaragoza | 2020–21 | Segunda División | 26 | 2 | 2 | 0 | — | | 28 | 2 |
| Cremonese (loan) | 2021–22 | Serie B | 36 | 8 | 1 | 0 | — | | 37 | 8 |
| Cremonese (loan) | 2022–23 | Serie A | 1 | 0 | 1 | 0 | — | | 2 | 0 |
| Career total | | | 124 | 17 | 4 | 0 | 0 | 0 | 128 | 17 |

== Honours ==
Juventus U23

- Coppa Italia Serie C: 2019–20

Juventus

- Serie A: 2019–20
