= Simone Muratore =

Italian footballer (born 1998)

Personal information
- Date of birth: 30 May 1998 (age 28)
- Place of birth: Saluzzo, Italy
- Height: 1.86 m (6 ft 1 in)
- Position: Midfielder

Team information
- Current team: Juventus (youth team collaborator)

Youth career
- 2007–2011: Saluzzo
- 2011–2018: Juventus

Senior career*
Years	Team	Apps	(Gls)
2018–2020	Juventus U23	49	(3)
2019–2020	Juventus	4	(0)
2020–2023	Atalanta	0	(0)
2020–2021	→ Reggiana (loan)	25	(2)
2021–2022	→ Tondela (loan)	2	(0)

International career^{‡}
2013–2014	Italy U16	6	(0)
2014	Italy U17	3	(0)
2015	Italy U18	1	(0)
2016	Italy U19	1	(0)
2020	Italy U21	1	(0)
- * Club domestic league appearances and goals as of 14 May 2022 ‡ National team caps and goals as of 13 October 2020

Simone Muratore (born 30 May 1998) is an Italian former professional footballer who played as a midfielder, currently working with Juventus as a youth team collaborator.

In December 2019, he made his senior debut with Juventus in the Champions League against Bayer Leverkusen. In June of the following year, he made his Serie A debut with the club against Lecce.

== Club career ==
=== Juventus ===
During the 2016–17 and 2017–18 seasons, Muratore received a call-up for the Juventus senior side in both the Coppa Italia and the UEFA Champions League respectively but did not appear on the pitch on either occasion, remaining on the bench.

He made his Serie C debut for Juventus U23 on 16 September 2018 in a 2–1 home defeat against Alessandria.

On 11 December 2019 he made his Champions League debut with Juventus in the team's final group match, a 2–0 away win over Bayer Leverkusen.

On 26 June 2019, he made his Serie A debut, appearing as a second-half substitute in Juventus's 4–0 home win over Lecce.

On 24 June 2020, it was announced that Muratore had been sold to Atalanta.

=== Atalanta ===
On 29 June 2020, Muratore signed for Atalanta for a fee of 7 million euros.

On 31 August 2021, he joined Tondela in Portugal on loan. He left Atalanta by the end of his contract on 30 June 2023.

== International career ==
On 13 October 2020, he made his debut with the Italy U21 playing as a starter in a qualifying match won 2–0 against Republic of Ireland in Pisa.

== Coaching career ==
In December 2024, Juventus announced the appointment of Muratore as a new youth team collaborator following his retirement from active football.

== Personal life ==
In late 2021, Muratore was diagnosed with a benign brain tumor and underwent surgery to remove it; the illness forced him to stop his football career for two years.

== Career statistics ==
As of match played 16 October 2021

Club	Season	League			National Cup (Note: Includes Coppa Italia and Taça de Portugal)		Europe		Other		Total	
Club	Season	Division	Apps	Goals	Apps	Goals	Apps	Goals	Apps	Goals	Apps	Goals
Juventus U23	2018–19	Serie C	34	2	2	0	–		–		36	2
Juventus U23	2019–20	Serie C	15	1	3	0	–		–		18	1
Juventus U23	Total		49	3	5	0	–		–		54	3
Juventus	2019–20	Serie A	4	0	0	0	1 (Note: Includes UEFA Champions League)	0	0	0	5	0
Atalanta	2020–21	Serie A	0	0	0	0	0	0	0	0	0	0
Reggiana (loan)	2020–21	Serie B	25	2	0	0	0	0	0	0	25	2
Tondela	2021–22	Primeira Liga	2	0	1	0	0	0	0	0	3	0
Career total			80	5	6	0	1	0	0	0	87	5

== Honours ==
=== Club ===
Juventus U23

- Coppa Italia Serie C: 2019–20

Juventus

- Serie A: 2019–20
