= Claudio Zappa =

Italian footballer (born 1997)

Personal information
- Date of birth: 30 March 1997 (age 29)
- Place of birth: Brescia, Italy
- Height: 1.76 m (5 ft 9 in)
- Positions: Defender; midfielder

Team information
- Current team: Virtus CiseranoBergamo

Youth career
- Lumezzane
- AlbinoLeffe
- 2013–2014: Beira-Mar
- 2014–2015: Sassuolo
- 2015: → Juventus (loan)

Senior career*
| Years | Team | Apps | (Gls) |
| 2015–2020 | Juventus | 0 | (0) |
| 2016–2017 | → Pontedera (loan) | 8 | (0) |
| 2017 | → Pordenone (loan) | 5 | (0) |
| 2017–2018 | → Pistoiese (loan) | 23 | (1) |
| 2018–2019 | → Juventus U23 (res.) | 10 | (1) |
| 2019 | → Novara (loan) | 4 | (0) |
| 2019–2020 | → Sliema Wanderers (loan) | 14 | (4) |
| 2020–2022 | Mantova | 27 | (1) |
| 2022 | Vibonese | 8 | (1) |
| 2022 | United Riccione | 11 | (1) |
| 2022–2024 | Real Calepina | 50 | (6) |
| 2024– | Virtus CiseranoBergamo | 7 | (0) |

International career
| 2012 | Italy under-16 | 3 | (0) |
| 2013 | Italy under-17 | 7 | (0) |
- * Club domestic league appearances and goals as of 10 November 2024

Claudio Zappa (born 30 March 1997) is an Italian professional footballer who plays as a defender for Serie D club Virtus CiseranoBergamo.

== Club career ==
=== Early career ===
Zappa was born in Brescia, Italy. He began his professional career in the youth teams of local Lombardy club Lumezzane. In 2011, he was transferred to AlbinoLeffe, again in the youth sector. In 2013, he completed a transfer to Portuguese club S.C. Beira-Mar, before returning to Italy less than a year later to sign with Sassuolo for a fee of €220,000. After impressing for the youth sides, reigning Serie A champions Juventus made an approach for Zappa, initially signing him to a 6-month loan in February 2015. Zappa was also suspended for 45 days in 2015 due to the irregular transfer to Portugal. AlbinoLeffe also appealed to the Court of Arbitration for Sport in order to recover part of the transfer fee.

=== Juventus ===
Juventus signed Zappa on loan in February 2015, for a loan fee of €200,000. He impressed coach Fabio Grosso and was generally the starting left-back for the Primavera side, playing in the Campionato Nazionale Primavera, 2015–16 UEFA Youth League, Supercoppa Primavera and Torneo di Viareggio. In June 2015 Juventus signed Zappa in a definitive deal for an additional fee of €1.5 million.

On 22 July 2016, Juventus confirmed that they had loaned Zappa to Lega Pro side Pontedera. He made his debut for the club in a 3–1 Loss to Foggia Calcio in the first round of the Coppa Italia, on 31 July 2016. Zappa's league debut came on 18 September 2016, playing 74 minutes against Racing Roma, after being listed on the bench for the previous two games against Olbia 1905 and Pistoiese. On 16 January 2017, Zappa was recalled from Pontedera by Juventus, and the following day was sent out on loan again, this time to Pordenone until 30 June 2017.

On 19 July 2017 Zappa was signed by Pistoiese.

On 31 January 2019 he joined Novara on loan until the end of the 2018–19 season.

On 2 September 2019 he joined Maltese club Sliema Wanderers on loan.

=== Mantova ===
On 18 August 2020 he moved to Mantova, newly promoted to Serie C.

=== Vibonese ===
On 31 January 2022, Zappa moved to Vibonese.
