= Ismaël Konaté =

Italian footballer (born 2006)

Personal information
- Date of birth: 29 March 2006 (age 20)
- Place of birth: Lecco, Italy
- Height: 1.83 m (6 ft 0 in)
- Position: Forward

Team information
- Current team: Juventus Next Gen
- Number: 29

Youth career
- AC Milan
- –2020: Lecco
- 2020–2024: Cagliari
- 2024–2025: Empoli

Senior career*
Years	Team	Apps	(Gls)
2024	Cagliari	0	(0)
2024–2026	Empoli	17	(0)
2026	→ Lecco (loan)	14	(4)
2026–	Juventus Next Gen	4	(0)

International career^{‡}
2025	Italy U19	1	(0)
2024–2025	Italy U20	10	(1)
- * Club domestic league appearances and goals as of 13 September 2026 ‡ National team caps and goals as of 9 October 2025

Ismaël Konaté (born 29 March 2006) is a professional footballer who plays as a forward for Serie C Group B club Juventus Next Gen. He is an former Italy youth international.

== Club career ==
As a youth player, he joined the youth academy of Serie A side AC Milan, before joining the youth academy of Italian side Lecco. In 2020, he joined the youth academy of Italian side Cagliari and was promoted to the club's first team in 2024. On 24 September 2024, he debuted for them during a 1-2 away loss to Torino in the Coppa Italia.

On 30 January 2026, Konaté was loaned by Lecco.

On 15 July 2026, he transferred permanently to Juventus' reserve team, ahead of the 2026–27 season.

== International career ==
Konaté represented Italy at the 2025 FIFA U-20 World Cup, where they were eliminated at the Round of 16.

== Style of play ==
Konaté plays as a forward and is known for his speed and versatility. Italian news website Sprint e Sport wrote in 2024 that "his physical structure and excellent technique make him a player capable of attacking the depth effectively".
