= Christos Papadopoulos =

Greek swimmer

Personal information
- Full name: Christos Papadopoulos
- National team: Greece
- Born: 19 May 1982 (age 44) Thessaloniki, Greece
- Height: 1.80 m (5 ft 11 in)
- Weight: 70 kg (154 lb)

Sport
- Sport: Swimming
- Strokes: Breaststroke
- Club: PAOK

Christos Papadopoulos (Greek: Χρήστος Παπαδόπουλος; born May 19, 1982) is a Greek swimmer, who specialized in breaststroke events. Papadopoulos qualified for the men's 100 m breaststroke at the 2004 Summer Olympics in Athens, representing the host nation Greece. He cleared a FINA B-standard entry time of 1:04.10 from a test event at the Athens Olympic Aquatic Centre. He challenged seven other swimmers on the fourth heat, including four-time Olympian Ratapong Sirisanont (Thailand), who was later disqualified for a false start. He touched out Senegal's Malick Fall to take a third spot by 0.07 of a second in 1:04.43. Papadopoulos failed to advance into the semifinals, as he placed thirty-ninth overall on the first day of preliminaries. At 2002 Balkan Games in Volos he won the gold medal with national record in 200 breaststroke (2.18.70). At the 2005 Mediterranean Games, he took 8th place in 200m breaststroke.

Papadopoulos also placed fifth in the men's 200 m breaststroke with a time of 2:11.48 at the World Cup in Berlin, 2005. In 2003 he swam the men's 200m Breastroke in the World Universiade in Daegu, Korea finishing eighth in the B-final. He has broken multiple national records in the breaststroke events and continues to swim to this day. In 1998 Christos won 6th place in the 200m Breastroke at the World Gymnasiade Games in Shanghai. Papadopoulos has been national champion in swimming events between 1998 and 2008 consecutively. Furthermore, he has been a finalist in the men's national OPEN swimming events between 1998 and 2015. Currently, Papadopoulos takes part in open water marathon and triathlon races and runs a specialised swimming and running store. He was also granted his bachelor's degree in business administration and management at the University of Macedonia, Greece.

In the European Masters Championship in 2024 he took first place in the 200 breaststroke with a time of 2.28.16 in the 40-44 age group.
