= Simone Guerra =

Italian footballer (born 1989)

Personal information
- Date of birth: 30 August 1989 (age 37)
- Place of birth: Piacenza, Italy
- Height: 1.78 m (5 ft 10 in)
- Position: Forward

Team information
- Current team: Juventus Next Gen
- Number: 17

Youth career
- 2006–2008: Piacenza

Senior career*
Years	Team	Apps	(Gls)
2006–2012	Piacenza	84	(11)
2012	→ Spezia (loan)	10	(0)
2012–2014	Virtus Entella	36	(14)
2014–2015	Benevento	6	(1)
2014–2015	→ Matera (loan)	13	(0)
2015	→ Venezia (loan)	18	(5)
2015–2018	Feralpisalò	112	(42)
2019–2021	Vicenza	53	(11)
2021–2023	Feralpisalò	88	(28)
2023–	Juventus Next Gen	96	(36)
- * Club domestic league appearances and goals as of 30 April 2026

Simone Guerra (born 30 August 1989) is an Italian professional footballer who plays as a forward and captains Serie C Group B club Juventus Next Gen.

Born in Piacenza, Emilia–Romagna, he played for his hometown between 2006 and 2012.

He is currently the most prolific goalscorer in the history of two clubs, FeralpiSalò and Juventus Next Gen.

== Club career ==
=== Piacenza ===
Between 2006 and 2008, he played for the "Primavera" (Under-19 team) of Piacenza, becoming a cornerstone of the side. In 2008, he played in the Torneo di Viareggio where he was awarded with the fair-play trophy because he refused to put the ball into an empty net after a collision between a teammate and the opposing goalkeeper.

In 2006–07 Serie B and 2007–08 Serie B, he made his debut in the Coppa Italia and he made his league debut in the last round of the Serie B season, on 1 June 2008. In that match he came on in place of teammate Antonio Piccolo at half-time.

In the 2008–09 Serie B season, he played regularly, until the end of 2008, with the "primavera" team, by early 2009, he had been shortlisted in the first team, and had made 10 appearances.

In 2009–10 Serie B season, he became a regular starter in the team, and marked his first goal, as a supportive striker to support Davide Moscardelli and Edgar Çani. At the end of the season, he had made 25 league appearances with 3 goals and 1 presence in the Italian Cup.

In the 2010–11 Serie B season, the club re-signed Daniele Cacia as a new central forward and a new coach Armando Madonna. Madonna preferred Mattia Graffiedi, and Tomás Guzmán as supportive strikers, and so Guerra was made 4th choice as forward, ahead of Piccolo and Alessandro Tulli. On 12 March, he scored his first goal of the season. At the end of the season, he had scored 2 goals in 29 appearances. Piacenza finished in 19th place and contested the relegation play-out against AlbinoLeffe. He played the second game, which ended 2–2 and then deciding the relegation in Lega Pro First Division.

In 2011–12 Lega Pro Prima Divisione in the preliminary of Italian Cup in the first game scored 3 goals and in the first match of Lega Pro scored the first goal of the match. He remains in the team until January and scored 9 goals in 20 league and cup appearances in total.

=== Spezia ===
Simone, 27 January, moved on loan to Spezia Calcio. He made his debut on 29 January in the match 1–1 draw against Siracusa, he scored his first goal in Coppa Italia Lega Pro at 90th minute the winning goal against the Carpi. On 3 May, he made the 100th professional appearance of his career. Thanks to his double, Spezia won the Pro League Cup Italy for the second time in its history, defeating Pisa Pisa 2–1 in the derby, overturning the 1–0 home defeat from the first leg.

=== Virtus Entella ===
At the end of the season is released due to the failure of Piacenza and the non-redemption by the Spezia, and so he trains for a short time with Atletico BP Pro Piacenza. On 29 August, signed for Virtus Entella team of eastern Liguria newly promoted to the First Division. Found here Ighli Vannucchi, Alberto Bianchi and Francesco Conti, already his comrades in La Spezia. He made his debut with his new team on 1 September following the successful challenge to 3–2 at the Tritium game in which scores a goal. Mark a brace the following week against the 4-1 internal Treviso.

=== Benevento ===
On 31 January 2014 purchased outright from Benevento, always in the Lega Pro Prima Divisione. Makes his debut won 2 March in the game lost 2–1 against Salernitana. It marks his first goal on 16 March signing the momentary 2–1 in the match drawn 2–2 at the Pisa.

=== Loans to Matera and Venezia ===
The following summer it was loaned to Matera, which debuted on 8 August in the game Coppa Italia Lega Pro won for 3- 1 against Vigor Lamezia. It collects 13 appearances. On 9 January 2015 always he moved on loan to Venezia. He made his debut on 17 January following the 2–0 victory against Pordenone. Marks its first goal on 28 February with a brace in the 2–1 win over Monza. At the end of the season scores 5 goals in 18 appearances.

=== Feralpisalò ===
On 21 June 2015 is made official his move to Feralpisalò, with whom he signed a one-year contract. He made his debut with Brescia on 2 August in the match valid for the first qualifying round of Coppa Italia won 5–1 against Fano, which scored a hat-trick.

=== Vicenza ===
He moved to Vicenza in January 2019.

=== Return to Feralpisalò ===
On 13 January 2021 he returned to Feralpisalò.

=== Juventus Next Gen ===
On 21 August 2023, Guerro joined Juventus Next Gen for one season. In June 2025, Guerra renewed for Juventus Next Gen until 2026.

== Career statistics ==
=== Club ===
As of match played 28 August 2021

Appearances and goals by club, season and competition
Club	Season	League			National Cup		Other		Total	
Club	Season	Division	Apps	Goals	Apps	Goals	Apps	Goals	Apps	Goals
Piacenza	2007–08	Serie B	1	0	0	0	—		1	0
Piacenza	2008–09	Serie B	10	0	0	0	—		10	0
Piacenza	2009–10	Serie B	25	3	1	0	—		26	3
Piacenza	2010–11	Serie B	29	2	1	0	1 (Note: Appearance(s) in Relegation Playoffs)	0	31	2
Piacenza	2011–12	Lega Pro 1	18	6	2	3	—		20	9
Piacenza	Total		83	11	4	3	1	0	88	14
Spezia (loan)	2011–12	Lega Pro 1	10	0	0	0	4 (Note: Two appearances and three goals in Coppa Italia Serie C, two appearances in Supercoppa di Serie C)	3	14	3
Virtus Entella	2012–13	Lega Pro 1	22	11	0	0	2 (Note: Appearance(s) in Promotion Playoffs)	0	24	11
Virtus Entella	2013–14	Lega Pro 1	14	4	2	0	3 (Note: Appearance(s) in Coppa Italia Serie C)	0	19	4
Virtus Entella	Total		36	15	2	0	5	0	43	15
Benevento	2013–14	Lega Pro 1	6	1	0	0	2	0	8	1
Matera (loan)	2014–15	Lega Pro	13	0	3	0	—		16	0
Venezia (loan)	2014–15	Lega Pro	18	5	0	0	—		18	5
Feralpisalò	2015–16	Lega Pro	25	7	2	3	1	2	28	12
Feralpisalò	2016–17	Lega Pro	34	13	0	0	1	0	35	13
Feralpisalò	2017–18	Serie C	33	19	1	0	6	2	40	21
Feralpisalò	2018–19	Serie C	19	3	0	0	1	0	20	3
Feralpisalò	Total		111	42	3	3	9	4	123	49
Vicenza	2018–19	Serie C	16	5	2	1	1	1	19	7
Vicenza	2019–20	Serie C	25	6	1	0	2	1	28	7
Vicenza	2020–21	Serie B	12	0	2	0	—		14	0
Vicenza	Total		53	11	5	1	3	2	61	14
Feralpisalò	2020–21	Serie C	20	6	0	0	4	1	24	7
Feralpisalò	2021–22	Serie C	1	0	0	0	—		1	0
Feralpisalò	Total		21	6	0	0	4	1	25	7
Career total			351	91	17	7	28	10	396	108

== Honours ==
=== Club ===
Spezia

- Lega Pro Prima Divisione: 2011–12 (Group A)
- Coppa Italia Serie C: 2011–12
- Supercoppa di Serie C: 2012

Vicenza

- Serie C: 2019–20 (Group C)

=== Individual ===
- Serie C top-goalscorer: 2017–18
