= Stadio Giuseppe Moccagatta =

Multi-use stadium in Alessandria, Italy

Coordinates: 44°55′12″N 8°37′01″E

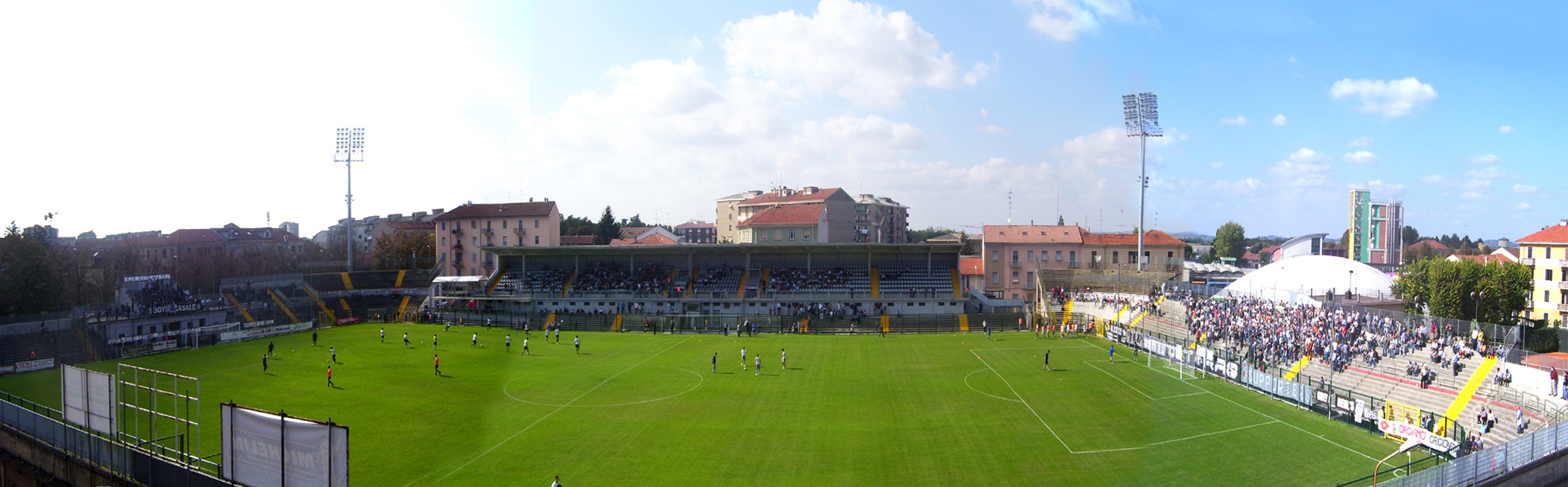
- Interactive map of Stadio Giuseppe Moccagatta
- Location: Alessandria, Italy
- Owner: Municipality of Alessandria
- Capacity: 5,827
- Surface: Grass

Construction
- Opened: 1929
- Renovated: 2009, 2017, 2019

Tenants
- U.S. Alessandria Calcio 1912 (1929–present); Juventus Next Gen (2018–2024; 2025–present)

Stadio Giuseppe Moccagatta is a multi-use stadium in Alessandria, Italy. It is used mostly for football matches and is the home ground of Alessandria and Juventus Next Gen. The stadium holds 5,827 people.

The stadium was named after Giuseppe Moccagatta, an Italian businessman, politician and sports executive from Alessandria. It is designed in a neoclassical style, and the façade was declared a protected asset by the Ministry of Culture in 2016.
