= Martin Palumbo =

Norwegian footballer (born 2002)

Personal information
- Full name: Martin Njøten Palumbo
- Date of birth: 5 March 2002 (age 24)
- Place of birth: Bergen, Norway
- Height: 1.86 m (6 ft 1 in)
- Position: Midfielder

Team information
- Current team: Avellino
- Number: 20

Youth career
- 2013–2020: Udinese

Senior career*
Years	Team	Apps	(Gls)
2020–2023	Udinese	4	(0)
2021–2022	→ Juventus (loan)	1	(0)
2021–2022	→ Juventus U23 (Note: The team's name was changed from Juventus U23 to Juventus Next Gen in August 2022.) (res.)	17	(0)
2022–2023	→ Juventus Next Gen (loan)	19	(1)
2023–2025	Juventus Next Gen	43	(5)
2025	→ Avellino (loan)	16	(1)
2025–	Avellino	35	(4)

International career
2019	Norway U17	6	(1)
2019	Italy U18	2	(1)
2020	Norway U18	3	(2)
2022	Norway U20	2	(0)
2021–2023	Norway U21	6	(2)
- * Club domestic league appearances and goals as of 10 May 2026

Martin Njøten Palumbo (born 5 March 2002) is a professional footballer who plays as a midfielder for Serie B club Avellino. Palumbo has represented both Norway and Italy internationally at youth level.

== Club career ==
In 2011, Palumbo joined Udinese's youth system. He made his professional debut for the club on 2 August 2020 against Sassuolo. Five days later, he extended his contract with Udinese until 2025. On 27 August 2021, Palumbo joined Juventus' U23 squad on loan with an option to buy. On 12 September, Palumbo debuted for Juve U23s in a 1–0 defeat against Pro Patria. On 16 May 2022, he was called up to the first team for a home match against Lazio, where he made his debut as a substitute. On 18 June, Juventus decided not to exercise their option to buy. However, on 1 September, he returned to Juventus U23s, who had changed their name to Juventus Next Gen on 26 August.

On 21 January 2025, Palumbo joined Serie C club Avellino on loan with a conditional obligation to buy, with whom he signed a contract until 2028.

== International career ==
Palumbo was born in Norway to an Italian father and a Norwegian mother, and moved to Italy at the age of three. He holds both Norwegian and Italian passports and has represented both countries as a youth international.

== Career statistics ==
=== Club ===
As of match played 12 May 2026

Club	Season	League			Coppa Italia		Other		Total	
Club	Season	Division	Apps	Goals	Apps	Goals	Apps	Goals	Apps	Goals
Udinese	2019–20	Serie A	1	0	0	0	—		1	0
Udinese	2020–21	Serie A	3	0	0	0	—		3	0
Udinese	Total		4	0	0	0	—		4	0
Juventus U23 (loan)	2021–22	Serie C	17	0	—		3 (Note: Two appearances in Coppa Italia Serie C, one appearance in Serie C promotion play-offs)	0	20	0
Juventus (loan)	2021–22	Serie A	1	0	0	0	0	0	1	0
Juventus Next Gen (loan)	2022–23	Serie C	19	1	—		6 (Note: Appearance in Coppa Italia Serie C)	0	25	1
Juventus Next Gen	2023–24	Serie C	23	0	—		0	0	23	0
Juventus Next Gen	2024–25	Serie C	21	5	—		0	0	21	5
Juventus Next Gen	Total		63	6	0	0	6	0	69	6
Avellino (loan)	2024–25	Serie C	16	1	—		0	0	16	1
Avellino	2025–26	Serie B	35	4	1	0	1 (Note: One appearance in Serie B promotion play-offs)	0	37	4
Avellino	Total		51	5	1	0	1	0	53	5
Career total			155	11	1	0	10	0	166	11
