= Massimo Brambilla =

Italian football player and coach (born 1973)

Personal information
- Full name: Massimo Brambilla
- Date of birth: 4 March 1973 (age 53)
- Place of birth: Vimercate, Italy
- Height: 1.77 m (5 ft 10 in)
- Position: Attacking midfielder

Team information
- Current team: Juventus Next Gen (head coach)

Senior career*
Years	Team	Apps	(Gls)
1991–1994	Monza	102	(4)
1995	Reggiana	23	(0)
1995–1996	Parma	35	(0)
1997	Bologna	16	(0)
1997–2002	Torino	97	(2)
2002–2003	Siena	34	(0)
2003–2005	Cagliari	56	(0)
2005–2007	Mantova	64	(0)
2007–2008	Monza	24	(0)
2008–2010	Pergocrema	49	(0)
Total		501	(6)

International career
1993–1996	Italy U21	17	(0)
1996	Italy U23	2	(0)

Managerial career
- 2022–2024: Juventus Next Gen
- 2024: Foggia
- 2024–: Juventus Next Gen
- 2025: Juventus (caretaker)
Medal record
Men's football
Representing Italy
UEFA European Under-21 Championship
Winner	1996 Spain
- * Club domestic league appearances and goals

Massimo Brambilla (born 4 March 1973) is an Italian professional football coach and former player who played as an attacking midfielder. He is currently head coach of Serie C Group B club Juventus Next Gen.

== Club career ==
Brambilla grew up in the football youth academy of Monza, and he was promoted to the first team for the 1990–91 season, taking part in the Serie C1 championship that season, and conquering Serie B promotion the year after. He stayed at Monza for two and a half more seasons, two of which were in Serie B, and a half season in C1, when in January 1995, he was acquired by Reggiana (then in Serie A), deciding to leave his hometown club, in order to play football in the top Italian division.

With Reggiana, Brambilla played half of the 1994–95 Serie A season, as the team was relegated to the lower divisions, and he was subsequently purchased by Parma. In the 1995–96 Serie A season, he made 26 league appearances, and in the next season, he initially remained at Parma, but in January, after having spent much time on the bench, and only making nine appearances, he was purchased outright by Serie A newcomers Bologna, with whom he played an excellent second half of season, collecting 14 appearances, and managing a 7th-place finish in Serie A.

In the summer of 1997, Italian star Roberto Baggio transferred to Bologna, and Brambilla remained somewhat on the sidelines, collecting only two full appearances during the start of the 1997–98 Serie A season. In October, he moved to a Torino side that had strong ambitions to obtain promotion to Serie A, and in his first season with the club, Brambilla made 26 appearances, scoring two goals. On the final matchday of the Serie B championship, however, he suffered a serious accident which also affected him the following season, as he only took part in the club's last 11 fixtures of the 1998–99 Serie B season, but still contributing to help Torino obtain Serie A promotion after three years in Serie B.

The following season, he obtained 28 appearances in the top flight, failing, however, to avoid the immediate relegation of his team to Serie B. The following year, the team was entrusted to Luigi Simoni, who often left the midfielder on the bench, only using him in the final minutes of matches. The team struggled to take off, and Simoni's position was increasingly at risk, resulting in his dismissal. The team was subsequently entrusted to Camolese, who made Brambilla a key member of the starting line-up, as Torino won the 2000–01 Serie B title, also obtaining Serie A promotion once again.

The following year, despite wearing the number-10 shirt, his relationship with Camolese deteriorates, and he is not played with continuity throughout the 2001–02 Serie A season, only making 8 appearances, although he still contributed to helping the club avoid relegation, and achieve a 2002 UEFA Intertoto Cup spot. At the end of the season, he joined an ambitious Siena side in Serie B, as the Tuscan club won a historic first promotion to Serie A that season.

Despite his fine season, he was later sold to Cagliari in Serie B, collecting 40 appearances in his first season with the club, helping Cagliari to obtain Serie A promotion for the first time in 4 years. The next season began way and saw Brambilla in excellent form, as he was deployed regularly under manager Arrigoni, but from January, he was used less frequently, collecting a total of only 17 appearances in Serie A that season. His final match in Serie A coincided with that of club legend Gianfranco Zola, in a 4–2 loss to Juventus.

At the end of the season, he decided to move closer to home by accepting a contract from the newly promoted Mantua side in Serie B, a club with lofty ambitions. Although the club was expected to aim for a mid-table finish, they surprised everyone by remaining at the top of the table until the Christmas break. The team subsequently suffered poor results, but before the end of the championship, the team managed to improve and obtain a place in the playoffs, although they were defeated in the final against Torino, missing the opportunity to obtain a Serie A promotion. Brambilla's last season with Mantova was rather mixed, as he collected 25 appearances but failed to achieve a play-off spot due to the 10-point difference between the third and fourth-placed sides.

In June 2007, his contract expired with Mantua, and on 9 July 2007, he signed a contract to return to end his career with his first club, Monza, in Serie C1.

The following summer, Brambilla signed a contract with Serie C side Pergocrema, spending four seasons with the club before retiring at the end of the 2011–12 Serie C1 season.

== International career ==
Although he was never capped at senior level, Brambilla played for the Italy Under-21 national football team on 17 occasions between 1993 and 1996, under manager Cesare Maldini. He was notably a member of the squad which won the 1996 UEFA European Under-21 Championship, and he also took part in the Olympic Games in Atlanta, making two appearances.

== Managerial career ==
In 2011, he obtained a UEFA A coaching license, which made him eligible to coach Lega Pro teams or below. In the 2010–11 season he was the coach of the Giovanissimi national under-16 team of Pergocrema. Following Valter Bonacina's departure as Atalanta Primavera coach, Brambilla was appointed his successor to the job. Prior to his appointment as under-19 coach, Brambilla had served as Atalanta's Allievi (under-17 coach).

After seven years as coach in Atalanta's youth sector, on 28 June 2022, Brambilla was appointed head coach of Juventus Next Gen, the reserve team of Juventus playing in the Serie C.

After two seasons, in June 2024, Brambilla departed from Juventus Next Gen to accept a coaching offer from fellow Serie C club Foggia. However, his experience at Foggia turned out to be short-lived, as he was dismissed on 25 September 2024 following a negative start to the new season. On 12 November 2024, Brambilla returned to Juventus Next Gen, replacing outgoing manager Paolo Montero.

On 27 October 2025, Brambilla was appointed as interim coach for Juventus, following the sacking of Igor Tudor.

== Personal life ==
Both Brambilla and his son Alessio, who plays football professionally as a midfielder for AC Bra on loan from Cremonese, are not related to the family of late Formula One racing driver Vittorio Brambilla.

== Managerial stats ==
As of match played 29 October 2025

Managerial record by team and tenure
Team	From	To	Record					Ref.
Team	From	To	M	W	D	L	Win %	Ref.
Juventus Next Gen	28 June 2022	30 June 2024	78	30	18	30	38.46	
Juventus (caretaker)	27 October 2025	30 October 2025	1	1	0	0	100.00	
Total			79	31	18	30	39.24	—

== Honours ==
=== Player ===
Monza

- Coppa Italia Serie C: 1990–91

Parma

- Supercoppa Italiana runner-up: 1995

Siena

- Serie B: 2002–03

Italy U21

- UEFA European Under-21 Championship: 1996

=== Manager ===
Atalanta Youth

- Campionato Primavera 1: 2018–19, 2019–20
- Supercoppa Primavera: 2019, 2020
