= Lorenzo Anghelè =

Italian footballer (born 2005)

Personal information
- Date of birth: 26 February 2005 (age 21)
- Place of birth: Genoa, Italy
- Height: 1.85 m (6 ft 1 in)
- Positions: Striker; attacking midfielder

Team information
- Current team: Südtirol (on loan from Juventus)
- Number: 17

Youth career
- Sampdoria
- 2019–2024: Juventus

Senior career*
Years	Team	Apps	(Gls)
2023–	Juventus Next Gen	72	(7)
2024–	Juventus	1	(0)
2026–	→ Südtirol (loan)	1	(0)

International career^{‡}
2022–2023	Italy U18	4	(0)
2023–2024	Italy U19	12	(4)
2024	Italy U20	5	(1)
- * Club domestic league appearances and goals as of 20 September 2026 ‡ National team caps and goals as of 19 November 2024

Lorenzo Anghelè (born 26 February 2005) is an Italian professional footballer who plays as a striker and attacking midfielder for Serie B club Südtirol on loan from Juventus. He is a former Italy youth international.

== Early life ==
Anghelè is a youth product of Sampdoria, later moving to the youth academy of Juventus in 2019, at the age of fourteen. He captained the under-19 side.

== Club career ==
Anghelè started his professional career with the reserve team Juventus Next Gen. On 1 October 2023, he made his debut with the club during a 0–1 loss to Torres. On 10 February 2024, Anghelè scored his first goal with the club during a 3–1 win over Torres.

On 26 August 2024, Anghelè made his debut for the Juventus senior team in the second matchday of the 2024–25 Serie A season.

== International career ==
Anghelè has represented Italy internationally at youth level. Having played with the U18s, U19s and U20s.

== Style of play ==
Anghelè mainly operates as a striker and an attacking midfielder. He is known for his agility and versatility.

== Career statistics ==
=== Club ===
As of match played 21 March 2026

Club	Season	League			Coppa Italia		Continental		Other		Total	
Club	Season	Division	Apps	Goals	Apps	Goals	Apps	Goals	Apps	Goals	Apps	Goals
Juventus Next Gen	2023–24	Serie C	26	3	3 (Note: Appearance(s) in Coppa Italia Serie C)	0	—		4 (Note: Appearance(s) in Serie C Promotion play-offs)	0	33	3
Juventus Next Gen	2024–25	Serie C	13	1	1	0	—		1	0	15	1
Juventus Next Gen	2025–26	Serie C	28	2	1	0	—		0	0	29	2
Juventus Next Gen	Total		67	6	5	0	—		5	0	77	6
Juventus	2024–25	Serie A	1	0	—		—		—		1	0
Juventus	2025–26	Serie A	0	0	—		—		—		0	0
Juventus	Total		1	0	0	0	0	0	0	0	1	0
Career total			68	6	5	0	0	0	5	0	78	6
