= Juventus Next Gen =

Reserve team of Juventus FC

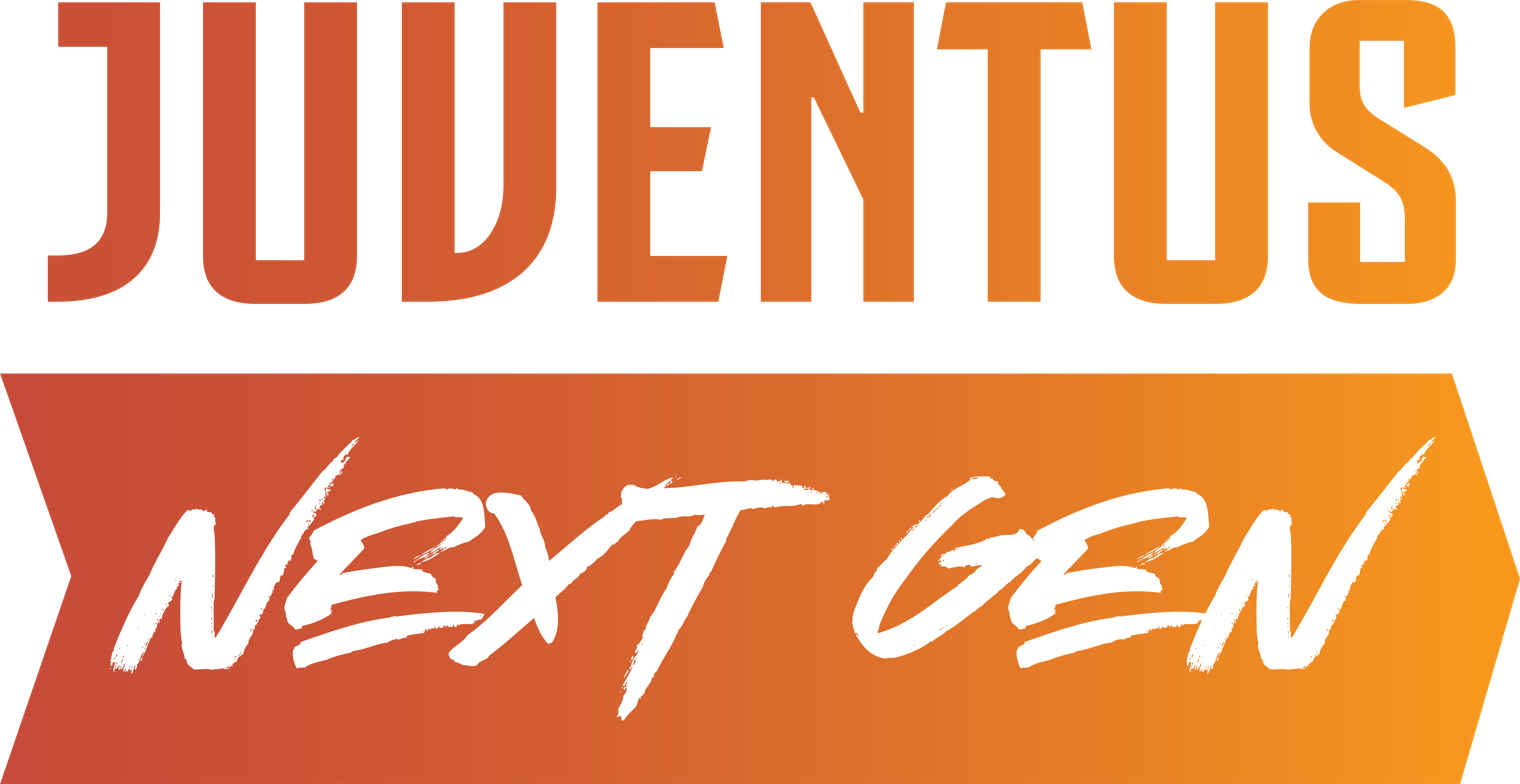
- Full name: Juventus Next Gen
- Short name: Juve Next Gen; Juve NG
- Founded: 3 August 2018; 8 years ago as Juventus U23
- Stadium: Stadio Giuseppe Moccagatta, Alessandria
- Capacity: 5,827
- President: Gianluca Ferrero
- Head coach: Massimo Brambilla
- League: Serie C Group B
- 2025–26: Serie C Group B, 5th of 20
- Website: juventus.com/next-gen
| Home colours | Away colours | Third colours |

Juventus Next Gen (Italian pronunciation: [juˈvɛntus nɛkst dʒɛn]), also known as Juve Next Gen or Juve NG, is a professional football club based in Turin, Piedmont, Italy, which acts as the reserve team of Serie A club Juventus. They compete in Serie C Group B, and play their home games at the Stadio Giuseppe Moccagatta in Alessandria.

Following the reintroduction of reserve teams in Italy, Juventus U23 was formed in 2018 and was registered to Serie C, the third level of the Italian league system. The club changed its name to Juventus Next Gen in 2022. They remained the sole Italian reserve team until August 2023 when Atalanta founded Atalanta Under-23 and further clubs followed. Juventus Next Gen have reached two Coppa Italia Serie C finals: one won in 2019–20 and one lost in 2022–23.

Due to the nature of the club as a reserve team, Juventus Next Gen needs to comply to certain regulations, such as being ineligible for promotion to Serie A and not competing in the Coppa Italia, the major national cup. The club—and in general FIGC's reserve-team project (not limited to Italy)—faced criticism, especially from fans of other Serie C teams due to their perceived lack of history and the disruption of the league's competitive balance.

== History ==
=== Predecessors (1904–1976) ===
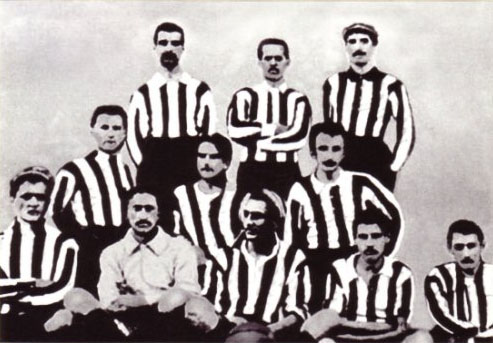
1905 Seconda Categoria winning team

Reserve teams were introduced in Italy in the early 20th century, and played in the Seconda Categoria. (Note: Not to be confused with the current Seconda Categoria, the eighth level of the Italian football league system) On 17 April 1904, the second team of Juventus lost the final 4–0 to Genoa II at the Ponte Carrega field. On 2 April 1905, after a 3–0 away win to AC Milan II, Juventus II obtained the mathematical certainty of first place at the final three-team group stage to win their only Seconda Categoria trophy. Juventus II also took part in the Campionato De Martino, another league dedicated to reserve teams, until the competition ceased in 1976; they won the 1959–60 edition. Juventus even had a third team who played friendly matches against local teams in the 1900s, and also in the 1910s, and competed in the Terza Categoria in the early 20th century. (Note: Not to be confused with the current Terza Categoria, the ninth level of the Italian football league system)

=== Juventus U23 (2018–2022) ===

2020 Coppa Italia Serie C final starting lineup

As early as in 2015, Juventus' sporting directors Fabio Paratici and Giuseppe Marotta had already made up an unofficial structure where players coming back from their own loans trained in Turin and played friendlies. Following the reintroduction of professional reserve teams in Italian football after over 40 years, Juventus U23 were founded on 3 August 2018 and were officially admitted to the Serie C championship. The system calqued the well-ingrained Spanish and German reserve-team systems with the purpose of bridging the gap between grassroots and Serie A football.

On 21 August, Luca Zanimacchia became the first scorer of the team's history after scoring the only goal in a 1–0 win over Cuneo in the group stage of the Coppa Italia Serie C. In the 2018–19 season, Juventus U23's first game in Serie C was a 2–1 away defeat to Alessandria, with Claudio Zappa scoring the team's first league goal. Juventus U23 ended their first season in 12th place with 42 points in 37 games, and were eliminated in the group stage of the Coppa Italia Serie C.

In the 2019–20 season, coached by Fabio Pecchia, Juventus U23 won the Coppa Italia Serie C after beating Ternana 2–1 in the final on 27 June 2020. The club won its first trophy in their second year as a professional club. In August, U19 coach Lamberto Zauli was promoted to U23 level, replacing Andrea Pirlo (who became first-team coach), who had in turn taken Pecchia's place. Zauli coached for the following two seasons in the 2021–22 season, Juventus U23 made their best-ever regular-season score with 54 points.

=== Juventus Next Gen (2022–present) ===
On 28 June 2022, Massimo Brambilla was appointed as Juventus U23's coach. On 26 August, the club changed its name to Juventus Next Gen. In the 2022–23 season, his first season, Brambilla's Juventus Next Gen reached the final of the Coppa Italia Serie C, lost 5–3 on aggregate to Vicenza, but they failed to qualify for the promotion play-offs, having finished the league at the thirteenth place with 49 points. In the 2023–24 season, they obtained the seventh place in the regular season, their best-ever-regular-season placement.

Brambilla left Juventus Next Gen at the end of the season, and was replaced by former U19 coach and former first-team defender Paolo Montero in mid 2024. Not long after the start of the 2024–25 season, Montero was sacked in November 2024, with the team trailing at the penultimate place in relegation zone and with them obtaining one only victory in 14 league matches. Brambilla returned to Juventus Next Gen on a contract until June 2025. Under Brambilla's leadership, Juventus Next Gen climbed the table and reached the play-off zone. Brambilla eventually went on to achieve their best-ever league placement, a fifth place in the 2025–26 season.

== Stadium ==
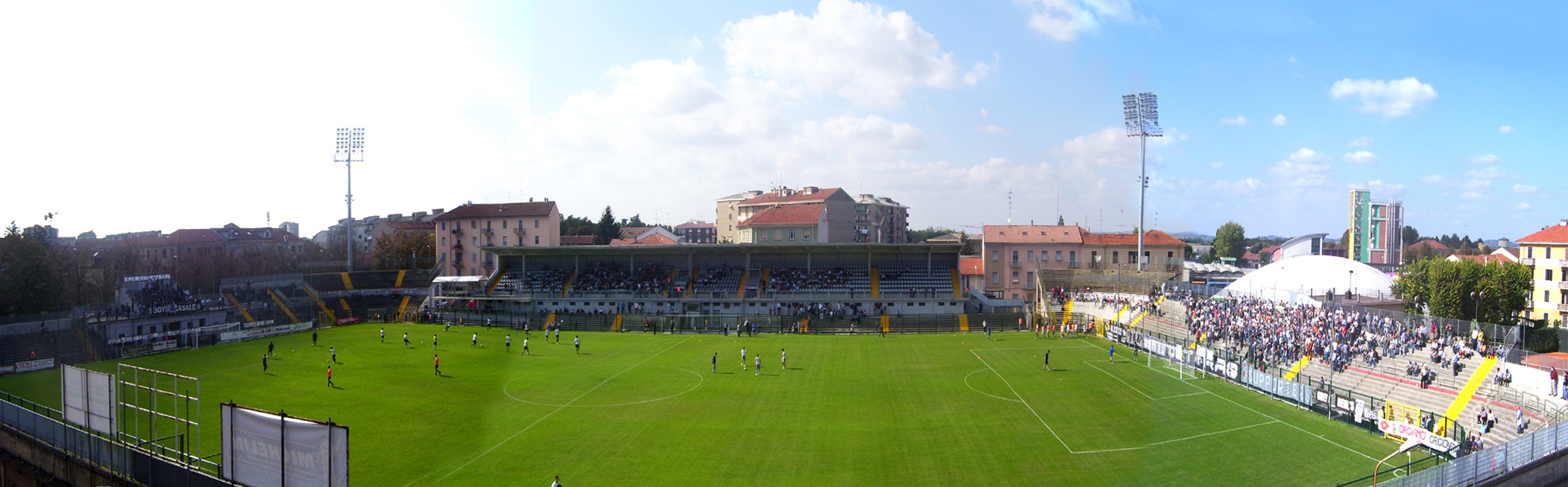
Juventus Next Gen mostly used the Stadio Giuseppe Moccagatta in Alessandria

Juventus Next Gen does not possess their own stadium. From 2018 to 2024, it shared the Stadio Giuseppe Moccagatta with Alessandria as their home stadium. Although there had been an agreement among the two parts shortly after Juventus's reserve team's foundation, Alessandria's fans protested to not share their stadium. According to the agreement, Juventus Next Gen fans can sit only in the guests sector. Their players train at the Juventus Training Center in Vinovo.

On 27 November 2022, Juventus Next Gen played exceptionally a match against Mantova at the Juventus Stadium, the first team home ground, in which tickets were free. The match was drawn 2–2, with Simone Iocolano scoring a brace for Juventus Next Gen and was seen by 28,572 fans present at the stadium. On 3 March 2023, the Juventus Stadium also hosted the first leg of the 2022–23 Coppa Italia Serie C final between Juventus Next Gen and Vicenza with an attendance of 21,572 spectators and with Juventus Next Gen losing 2–1. The venue annually hosts a friendly match against the first team in August, a friendly that customarily ends with a peaceful pitch invasion from fans.

In the 2024–25 season, Juventus Next Gen, alongside Juventus Women (the club's women's football), have been using the Stadio La Marmora-Pozzo in Biella. Nevertheless, Juventus Next Gen returned to the Moccagatta just one year later. Since 2021, Juventus has evaluated the opportunity of building a new stadium for both Next Gen and Women's team.

== Regulations ==
Juventus Next Gen play in the same professional Italian football league system as their senior team rather than a separate league dedicated for youth teams; however, the reserve team cannot play in the same division or higher as their senior team nor in the Coppa Italia, making Juventus Next Gen ineligible for promotion to the Serie A. Should both Juventus and Juventus Next Gen qualify in the same league, the reserve team must play in the league immediately below. Juventus must pay an annual extraordinary fee of €1.2 million to have the reserve team registered to Serie C. In addition, Juventus may not take part to Lega Pro assemblies.

Juventus Next Gen may insert a maximum of 23 players in their team sheets. Only four players aged more than 23 when the season started may be inserted in the team sheets. Up to a maximum of seven players who had been registered to a FIGC-affiliated club for less than seven sporting seasons may be included in the match list. In order to be eligible to play for Juventus Next Gen, players must have not been registered to the 25-man list of Serie A players and must have played at most 50 Serie A matches. Instead, to be eligible to play in promotion play-offs and in relegation play-outs, players must have not played over 25 first-team league matches of at least 30 minutes. If a player is suspended, he is unusable in both the first and reserve teams. Suspensions must be served in the team with whom he committed the infraction. Until 2024–25, Juventus Next Gen could not register in the Serie D in case of relegation, and the team would have been dissolved; starting from that season, reserve teams are now eligible for registration in Serie D.

== Reception ==
Juventus's reserve team and the FIGC's second-team project itself, which was already adopted in other countries by many decades prior (Barcelona Atlètic and Real Madrid Castilla in Spain or Bayern Munich II in Germany, among other top European clubs) as there were reserve teams since the sport's early decades, faced significant criticism. On 28 July 2018, even before the team's official foundation, Sicula Leonzio president Giuseppe Leonardo criticised Juventus's choice to form their reserve team by saying: "Reserve teams are a flop, an experiment that does not lead to anywhere. Juventus B are going to be harmful and will distort the championship: they are not a newly promoted team but they are certainly going to be strong, we have seen this in women's football that the Bianconeri don't make a bad impression wherever they put their effort." In August 2018, Sportitalia director Michele Criscitellio criticised the second-team project by stating: "The mission of Juve[ntus] B was to get their youngsters to play and not to take away a place from the Serie C clubs to reach the Serie B. The buying power is so different that there would be no competition. It is pointless to make investments for whoever Juventus will end up in the group." Despite criticism, Juventus Next Gen was influential as the first second-team of a Serie A club, as Atalanta U23, Milan Futuro, and Inter U23 were established in the next decade.

In December 2018, Pisa's fan groups criticised Juventus U23 by stating, in an official statement: "B teams are an insult to the dignity of those who consider the Lega Pro their own Serie A", further noting that Pisa should not act as a "sparring partner" for "youngsters without a stadium and history". The Pisa fan groups also boycotted the two league matches against Juventus U23 in the 2018–19 Serie C. In September 2019, an Arezzo fan group flew a banner in front of their bus saying "No to B teams". They too boycotted the match against them as they had done in the preceding April. In November 2021, a Padova fan group called Juventus U23 a "Super League franchise" and boycotted the two league matches against them. In July 2022, Lega Serie B president Mauro Balata expressed dissent towards reserve teams playing in Serie B, saying: "Our league embraces big and important cities. If another league wants to continue with this second-team project they can do so, but without affecting our rights and our history. It is not fair."

== Players ==
=== Current squad ===
As of 25 October 2026

Note: Flags indicate national team as defined under FIFA eligibility rules; some limited exceptions apply. Players may hold more than one non-FIFA nationality.

| No. | Pos. | Nation | Player |
|---|---|---|---|
| 1 | GK | ITA | Matteo Fuscaldo |
| 2 | DF | ITA | Niccolò Rizzo |
| 4 | DF | NED | Shane van Aarle |
| 5 | MF | ITA | Federico Macca |
| 6 | MF | BEL | Grady Makiobo |
| 7 | FW | ENG | Justin Oboavwoduo |
| 8 | MF | ITA | Augusto Owusu |
| 9 | FW | ALB | Arman Durmiši |
| 10 | MF | TUR | Teoman Gündüz |
| 11 | FW | ITA | Luca Amaradio |
| 13 | FW | ITA | Francesco Verde |
| 14 | FW | ITA | Destiny Elimoghale |
| 15 | DF | ITA | Federico Savio |
| 16 | MF | ITA | Filippo Pagnucco |
| 17 | FW | ITA | Simone Guerra (captain) |
| 18 | DF | ITA | Mattia Brugarello |
| 20 | MF | BEL | Enzo Keutgen |

| No. | Pos. | Nation | Player |
|---|---|---|---|
| 21 | FW | ITA | Antonio Stefano Merola |
| 22 | GK | ITA | Stefano Mangiapoco |
| 23 | MF | ITA | Edoardo Vallana |
| 24 | MF | POL | Patryk Mazur |
| 25 | FW | BEL | Ali Camara |
| 26 | MF | ITA | Diego Ripani |
| 27 | MF | ITA | Francesco Leone |
| 29 | FW | ITA | Ismaël Konaté |
| 30 | GK | ITA | Simone Cat Berro |
| 34 | MF | ITA | Stefano Turco |
| 38 | DF | ITA | Christian Corradi (on loan from Hellas Verona) |
| 40 | GK | ROU | Riccardo Radu |
| 44 | DF | URU | Alfonso Montero |
| 48 | DF | BEL | Josue Grelaud |
| 72 | MF | ITA | Filippo Melegoni |
| — | GK | ALB | Raffaele Huli |

=== Out on loan ===
Note: Flags indicate national team as defined under FIFA eligibility rules; some limited exceptions apply. Players may hold more than one non-FIFA nationality.

| No. | Pos. | Nation | Player |
|---|---|---|---|
| — | DF | ITA | Alessandro Bassino (at Folgore Caratese until 30 June 2027) |
| — | DF | ITA | Brando Moruzzi (at Avellino until 30 June 2027) |
| — | MF | ITA | Francesco Crapisto (at Crotone until 30 June 2027) |
| — | MF | ITA | Giacomo Faticanti (at Avellino until 30 June 2027) |
| — | MF | GER | Adin Ličina (at Cremonese until 30 June 2027) |

| No. | Pos. | Nation | Player |
|---|---|---|---|
| — | MF | ITA | Valdes Ngana (at Foggia until 30 June 2027) |
| — | FW | ITA | Alessandro Pietrelli (at Vicenza until 30 June 2027) |
| — | FW | ITA | Diego Pugno (at Ajax until 30 June 2027) |
| — | FW | ITA | Alessio Vacca (at Folgore Caratese until 30 June 2027) |

=== Primavera ===
Note: Flags indicate national team as defined under FIFA eligibility rules; some limited exceptions apply. Players may hold more than one non-FIFA nationality.

| No. | Pos. | Nation | Player |

=== Notable players ===
As of 23 September 2026

This list includes players that have appeared in at least one first-team game for Juventus. Players in bold are currently playing at Juventus, or for another club on loan from Juventus.

- (Albania) Giacomo Vrioni
- (Argentina) Enzo Barrenechea
- (Argentina) Matías Soulé
- (Belgium) Koni De Winter
- (Belgium) Samuel Mbangula
- (Belgium) Joseph Nonge
- (Belgium) Daouda Peeters
- (Brazil) David Wesley
- (Brazil) Kaio Jorge
- (Brazil) Matheus Pereira
- (Cyprus) Grigoris Kastanos
- (England) Samuel Iling-Junior
- (England) Stephy Mavididi
- (England) **Justin Oboavwoduo**
- (Spain) Dean Huijsen
- (France) Marley Aké
- (Italy) Lorenzo Anghelè
- (Italy) Tommaso Barbieri
- (Italy) Leonardo Cerri
- (Italy) Marco Da Graca
- (Italy) Alessandro Di Pardo
- (Italy) Nicolò Fagioli
- (Italy) Gianluca Frabotta
- (Italy) Paolo Gozzi
- (Italy) Fabio Miretti
- (Italy) Simone Muratore
- (Italy) Hans Nicolussi Caviglia
- (Italy) Marco Olivieri
- (Italy) **Augusto Owusu**
- (Italy) Manolo Portanova
- (Italy) **Diego Pugno**
- (Italy) Nikola Sekulov
- (Italy) Luca Zanimacchia
- (Montenegro) **Vasilije Adžić**
- (Norway) Martin Palumbo
- (Portugal) Félix Correia
- (Romania) Radu Drăgușin
- (Sweden) **Jonas Rouhi**
- (Tunisia) Hamza Rafia
- (Turkey) **Kenan Yıldız**
- (Uruguay) Franco Israel

== Coaching staff ==
| Position | Staff |
|---|---|
| Head coach | (Italy) Massimo Brambilla |
| Assistant coach | (Italy) Christian Terni |
| Athletic coaches | (Italy) Alberto Pasini |
| Goalkeeper coach | (Italy) Daniele Borri |
| Technical collaborator | (Italy) Francesco Spanò |
| Match analyst | (Italy) Matteo Poletti |
| Team manager | (Italy) Marco Lombardo |

Last updated: 12 November 2024
Source: Juventus.com

== Managerial history ==
Below is a list of Juventus Next Gen managers from 2018 until the present day.

| Name | Nationality | Years |
|---|---|---|
| Mauro Zironelli | (Italy) | 2018–2019 |
| Fabio Pecchia | (Italy) | 2019–2020 |
| Andrea Pirlo (Note: Pirlo had been appointed to coach Juventus U23 on 30 July but was promoted as first-team manager on 8 August.) | (Italy) | 2020 |
| Lamberto Zauli | (Italy) | 2020–2022 |
| Massimo Brambilla | (Italy) | 2022–2024 |
| Paolo Montero | (Uruguay) | 2024 |
| Massimo Brambilla | (Italy) | 2024–present |
| Edoardo Sacchini | (Italy) | 2025 (Note: On interim charge) |

== Season to season ==
| Season | League | | | Coppa Italia Serie C |
| Season | Tier | Division | Position | Coppa Italia Serie C |
|---|---|---|---|---|
| 2018–19 | 3 | Serie C | 12th of 20 | Group stage |
| 2019–20 | 3 | Serie C | 10th of 20 (Note: Lost in play-off quarter-finals to Carrarese) | Champions |
| 2020–21 | 3 | Serie C | 10th of 20 (Note: Lost in play-off second round (league phase) to Novara) | Cancelled |
| 2021–22 | 3 | Serie C | 8th of 20 (Note: Lost in play-off quarter-finals to Padova) | Round of 16 |
| 2022–23 | 3 | Serie C | 13th of 20 | Runners-up |
| 2023–24 | 3 | Serie C | 7th of 20 (Note: Lost in play-off quarter-finals to Carrarese) | Round of 16 |
| 2024–25 | 3 | Serie C | 9th of 20 (Note: Lost in play-off second round (league phase) to Crotone) | First round |
| 2025–26 | 3 | Serie C | 5th of 20 | Second round |
| 2026–27 | 3 | Serie C | | First round |
Champions Runners-up Third place/semi-finalists

== Honours ==
- Coppa Italia Serie C
  - Winners (1): 2019–20
  - Runners-up (1): 2022–23

== See also ==
- Italian reserve football teams
- Juventus FC Youth Sector
