= 2019–20 Juventus FC season =

Italian football club season

Juventus
2019–20 season
- Chairman: Andrea Agnelli
- Head coach: Maurizio Sarri
- Stadium: Juventus Stadium
- Serie A: 1st
- Coppa Italia: Runners-up
- Supercoppa Italiana: Runners-up
- UEFA Champions League: Round of 16
- Top goalscorer: League: Cristiano Ronaldo (31); All: Cristiano Ronaldo (37)
Home colours	Away colours	Third colours

The 2019–20 season was Juventus Football Club's 122nd in existence and 13th consecutive season in the top-flight of Italian football. In addition to the domestic league, Juventus competed in the Coppa Italia, losing to Napoli in the final, Supercoppa Italiana, and the Champions League.

== Players ==
=== Squad information ===
Players and squad numbers last updated on 22 February 2020. Appearances include league matches only.
Note: Flags indicate national team as has been defined under FIFA eligibility rules. Players may hold more than one non-FIFA nationality.

No.	Name	Nat	Position(s)	Date of birth (age)	Signed in	Contract ends	Signed from	Transfer Fee	Apps.	Goals
Goalkeepers
1	Wojciech Szczęsny	(Poland)	GK	18 April 1990 (aged 30)	2017	2024	(England) Arsenal	€12M	45	0
31	Carlo Pinsoglio	(Italy)	GK	16 March 1990 (aged 30)	2014	2021	(Italy) Youth Sector	N/A	2	0
77	Gianluigi Buffon	(Italy)	GK	28 January 1978 (aged 42)	2019	2021	(France) Paris Saint-Germain	Free	509	0
Defenders
2	Mattia De Sciglio	(Italy)	RB / RWB / LB / LWB	20 October 1992 (aged 27)	2017	2022	(Italy) AC Milan	€12M	34	1
3	Giorgio Chiellini (C)	(Italy)	CB	14 August 1984 (aged 35)	2005	2021	(Italy) Fiorentina	€7.4M	383	26
4	Matthijs de Ligt	(Netherlands)	CB	12 August 1999 (aged 20)	2019	2024	(Netherlands) Ajax	€75M	0	0
12	Alex Sandro	(Brazil)	LB / LWB	26 January 1991 (aged 29)	2015	2023	(Portugal) Porto	€26M	106	10
13	Danilo	(Brazil)	RB / RWB	15 July 1991 (aged 28)	2019	2024	(England) Manchester City	€37M	0	0
19	Leonardo Bonucci	(Italy)	CB	1 May 1987 (aged 33)	2018	2024	(Italy) AC Milan	€35M	244	14
24	Daniele Rugani	(Italy)	CB	29 July 1994 (aged 25)	2015	2023	(Italy) Empoli	€3.5M	69	6
28	Merih Demiral	(Turkey)	CB	5 March 1998 (aged 22)	2019	2024	(Italy) Sassuolo	€18M	0	0
Midfielders
5	Miralem Pjanić	(Bosnia and Herzegovina)	DM / CM	2 April 1990 (aged 30)	2016	2023	(Italy) Roma	€32M	92	12
6	Sami Khedira	(Germany)	DM / CM	4 April 1987 (aged 33)	2015	2021	(Spain) Real Madrid	Free	87	21
8	Aaron Ramsey	(Wales)	CM / RM / AM	26 December 1990 (aged 29)	2019	2023	(England) Arsenal	Free	0	0
14	Blaise Matuidi	(France)	CM / LM / DM	9 April 1987 (aged 33)	2017	2021	(France) Paris Saint-Germain	€20M	63	6
25	Adrien Rabiot	(France)	CM	3 April 1995 (aged 25)	2019	2023	(France) Paris Saint-Germain	Free	0	0
30	Rodrigo Bentancur	(Uruguay)	CM	25 June 1997 (aged 23)	2017	2024	(Argentina) Boca Juniors	€9.5M	51	2
Forwards
7	Cristiano Ronaldo	(Portugal)	LW / ST	5 February 1985 (aged 35)	2018	2022	(Spain) Real Madrid	€100M^{b}	31	26
10	Paulo Dybala	(Argentina)	RW / AM / SS	15 November 1993 (aged 26)	2015	2022	(Italy) Palermo	€32M	128	57
11	Douglas Costa	(Brazil)	LW / RW	14 September 1990 (aged 29)	2017	2022	(Germany) Bayern Munich	€40M	48	5
16	Juan Cuadrado	(Colombia)	RW / RWB / RB	26 May 1988 (aged 32)	2016	2022	(England) Chelsea	€25M	97	11
21	Gonzalo Higuaín	(Argentina)	ST / CF	10 December 1987 (aged 32)	2016	2021	(Italy) Napoli	€90M	73	40
33	Federico Bernardeschi	(Italy)	RW / LW / AM	16 February 1994 (aged 26)	2017	2022	(Italy) Fiorentina	€40M	50	6
Players transferred during the season
17	Mario Mandžukić	(Croatia)	ST / LW	21 May 1986 (aged 34)	2015	2021	(Spain) Atlético Madrid	€19M	117	30
20	Marko Pjaca	(Croatia)	SS / LW / RW	6 May 1995 (aged 25)	2016	2021	(Croatia) Dinamo Zagreb	€23M	14	0
23	Emre Can	(Germany)	DM / CM	12 January 1994 (aged 26)	2018	2022	(England) Liverpool	Free^{a}	29	4
37	Mattia Perin	(Italy)	GK	10 November 1992 (aged 27)	2018	2022	(Italy) Genoa	€15M	9	0

a. Additional costs of €16 million to be paid over the next two financial years.
b. Additional costs of €12 million to be paid.

== Transfers ==
=== Summer 2019 ===
==== In ====
Date	Pos.	Player	Age	Moving from	Fee	Notes	Source
1 July 2019	MF	(Wales) Aaron Ramsey	28	(England) Arsenal	Free	Additional costs of €3.7M	
1 July 2019	MF	(France) Adrien Rabiot	24	(France) Paris Saint-Germain	Free	Additional costs of €10M	
1 July 2019	FW	(Argentina) Gonzalo Higuaín	31	(England) Chelsea	N/A	Loan return	
1 July 2019	FW	(Croatia) Marko Pjaca	24	(Italy) Fiorentina	N/A	Loan return	
4 July 2019	GK	(Italy) Gianluigi Buffon	41	(France) Paris Saint-Germain	Free		
5 July 2019	DF	(Turkey) Merih Demiral	21	(Italy) Sassuolo	€18M		
18 July 2019	DF	(Netherlands) Matthijs de Ligt	19	(Netherlands) Ajax	€75M	Additional costs of €10.5M	
7 August 2019	DF	(Brazil) Danilo	28	(England) Manchester City	€37M	Part of João Cancelo deal	

==== Out ====
Date	Pos.	Player	Age	Moving to	Fee	Notes	Source
1 July 2019	DF	(Italy) Andrea Barzagli	38	Retired	—N/a		
1 July 2019	DF	(Uruguay) Martín Cáceres	32	(Italy) Lazio	Free	End of loan	
1 July 2019	DF	(Italy) Leonardo Spinazzola	26	(Italy) Roma	€29.5M		
4 August 2019	FW	(Italy) Moise Kean	19	(England) Everton	€27.5M + €2.5M variables	Option for future buy-back	
7 August 2019	DF	(Portugal) João Cancelo	24	(England) Manchester City	€65M	Part of Danilo deal	
22 August 2019	MF	(Cyprus) Grigoris Kastanos	21	(Italy) Pescara	N/A	On loan until June 2020 with option to buy	
29 August 2019	MF	(Brazil) Matheus Pereira	21	(France) Dijon	N/A	On loan until June 2020 with option to buy	
29 August 2019	FW	(England) Stephy Mavididi	21	(France) Dijon	N/A	On loan until June 2020 with option to buy	
2 September 2019	MF	(Italy) Hans Nicolussi Caviglia	19	(Italy) Perugia	N/A	On loan until June 2020	

==== Other acquisitions ====
Date	Pos.	Player	Age	Moving from	Fee	Notes	Source
1 July 2019	MF	(Italy) Luca Clemenza	21	(Italy) Padova	N/A	Loan return to play for Juventus Under 23	
1 July 2019	MF	(Italy) Filippo Delli Carri	20	(Italy) Rieti	N/A	Loan return to play for Juventus Under 23	
1 July 2019	MF	(Italy) Stefano Beltrame	26	(Netherlands) Den Bosch	N/A	Loan return to play for Juventus Under 23	
1 July 2019	FW	(Italy) Eric Lanini	25	(Italy) Imolese	N/A	Loan return to play for Juventus Under 23	
1 July 2019	DF	(Italy) Luca Pellegrini	20	(Italy) Roma	€22M	On loan to Cagliari until 30 June 2020	
11 July 2019	DF	(Argentina) Cristian Romero	21	(Italy) Genoa	€26M + €5.3M variables	On loan to Genoa until 30 June 2020	
16 July 2019	MF	(France) Hamza Rafia	20	(France) Lyon	€0.4M + €5M variables	To play for Juventus Under 23	
1 August 2019	DF	(Italy) Erasmo Mulè	20	(Italy) Sampdoria	€3.5M + variables	To play for Juventus Under 23	
2 August 2019	DF	(Italy) Gianluca Frabotta	20	(Italy) Bologna	€2.6M	To play for Juventus Under 23	
5 August 2019	FW	(Portugal) Dany Mota	21	(Italy) Virtus Entella	€1.8M + variables	To play for Juventus Under 23	
6 August 2019	FW	(Italy) Matteo Stoppa	18	(Italy) Novara	€1M	To play for Juventus Under 23	
30 August 2019	MF	(Ghana) Ransford Selasi	21	(Italy) Pescara	Undisclosed	To play for Juventus Under 23	
2 September 2019	FW	(North Korea) Han Kwang Song	20	(Italy) Cagliari	N/A	On loan until June 2020 to play for Juventus Under 23 with obligation to buy for €3.5M	
2 September 2019	MF	(Italy) Filippo Ranocchia	18	(Italy) Perugia	N/A	End of loan	

==== Other disposals ====
Date	Pos.	Player	Age	Moving to	Fee	Notes	Source
20 June 2019	FW	(Italy) Riccardo Orsolini	22	(Italy) Bologna	€15M	Opted to sign permanently and €22.5M Buy-back clause for Juventus	
1 July 2019	DF	(Brazil) Rogério	21	(Italy) Sassuolo	€6M	Signed permanently by option to buy	
1 July 2019	DF	(Italy) Matteo Pinelli	18	(Italy) Sassuolo	€1.8M	Signed permanently	
1 July 2019	DF	(Italy) Luca Barlocco	24	(Italy) L.R. Vicenza Virtus	Free	Contract expiration	
1 July 2019	MF	(Guinea) Oumar Toure	20	Unattached	Free	Contract expiration	
1 July 2019	FW	(Guinea) Alhassane Soumah	21	Unattached	Free	Contract expiration	
2 July 2019	DF	(Sweden) Mattias Andersson	21	(Switzerland) Sion	€4M		
2 July 2019	MF	(France) Roger Tamba M'Pinda	20	(Cyprus) Apollon Limassol	Undisclosed		
4 July 2019	MF	(Portugal) Luka Oliveira	21	(Portugal) F.C. Famalicão	Undisclosed		
8 July 2019	GK	(Romania) Laurentiu Branescu	25	(Scotland) Kilmarnock	N/A	On loan until June 2020	
11 July 2019	FW	(Italy) Davide Cais	25	(Italy) Arzignano Valchiampo	Free	Contract expiration	
12 July 2019	FW	(Italy) Leonardo Mancuso	27	(Italy) Empoli	€4.5M		
12 July 2019	MF	(Italy) Ferdinando Del Sole	21	(Italy) Juve Stabia	N/A	On loan until June 2020	
16 July 2019	FW	(Democratic Republic of the Congo) Benjamin Mokulu	29	(Italy) Padova	€0.45M		
22 July 2019	GK	(Italy) Mattia Del Favero	21	(Italy) Piacenza	N/A	On loan until June 2020	
24 July 2019	DF	(Italy) Stefano Pellizzari	22	(Italy) Ravenna	Free	Contract expiration	
24 July 2019	FW	(Italy) Stefano Padovan	25	(Italy) Imolese	Free	Contract expiration	
24 July 2019	DF	(Italy) Alessandro Vogliacco	20	(Italy) Pordenone	Undisclosed	Option for buy-back for Juventus	
1 August 2019	DF	(Italy) Matteo Manfroni	19	(Italy) GSD Ambrosiana	Free	Termination contract	
2 August 2019	MF	(Italy) Nicola Mosti	21	(Italy) Monza	N/A	On loan until June 2020 with option to buy	
14 August 2019	FW	(Italy) Nicolò Pozzebon	22	(Italy) Arzachena	Free	Contract expiration	
16 August 2019	DF	(Italy) Lorenzo Del Prete	33	(Italy) Trapani	Undisclosed		
16 August 2019	FW	(France) Kévin Monzialo	19	(Switzerland) Grasshopper	N/A	On loan until June 2020 with option to buy	
29 August 2019	DF	(Italy) Dario Del Fabro	24	(Scotland) Kilmarnock	N/A	On loan until June 2020	
31 August 2019	DF	(Italy) Edoardo Masciangelo	23	(Italy) Pescara	N/A	On loan until June 2020	
2 September 2019	MF	(Netherlands) Leandro Fernandes	19	(Netherlands) Fortuna Sittard	N/A	On loan until June 2020	
2 September 2019	GK	(Italy) Filippo Marricchi	20	(Italy) Novara	Free	Signed permanently by option to buy	
2 September 2019	DF	(Italy) Claudio Zappa	22	(Malta) Sliema Wanderers	N/A	On loan until June 2020	
10 September 2019	MF	(Italy) Giorgio Siani	22	(Italy) Savona	Free	Contract expiration	
11 September 2019	GK	(Canada) Alessandro Busti	19	(Italy) Belluno	Free	Contract expiration	

=== Winter 2019–20 ===
==== In ====
Date	Pos.	Player	Age	Moving from	Fee	Notes	Source

==== Out ====
Date	Pos.	Player	Age	Moving to	Fee	Notes	Source
30 December 2019	FW	(Croatia) Mario Mandžukić	33	(Qatar) Al-Duhail	Free	Released	
2 January 2020	GK	(Italy) Mattia Perin	27	(Italy) Genoa	N/A	On loan until June 2020	
31 January 2020	MF	(Germany) Emre Can	25	(Germany) Borussia Dortmund	€1M	On loan with obligation to buy for €25M at some conditions until June 2020	
31 January 2020	FW	(Croatia) Marko Pjaca	24	(Belgium) Anderlecht	N/A	On loan until June 2020	

==== Other acquisitions ====
Date	Pos.	Player	Age	Moving from	Fee	Notes	Source
2 January 2020	MF	(Sweden) Dejan Kulusevski	19	(Italy) Atalanta	€35M + €9M variables	On loan to Parma until 30 June 2020	
2 January 2020	FW	(North Korea) Han Kwang-song	21	(Italy) Cagliari	€3.5M	Redeem after loan	
10 January 2020	FW	(Switzerland) Yannick Cotter	18	(Switzerland) Sion	Undisclosed	On loan to Sion until 30 June 2020	
10 January 2020	MF	(Italy) Ferdinando Del Sole	21	(Italy) Juve Stabia	N/A	End of loan to play for Juventus Under 23	
17 January 2020	DF	(France) Jean-Claude Ntenda	17	(France) Nantes	Free		
21 January 2020	FW	(Italy) Ettore Marchi	34	(Italy) Monza	N/A	On loan until June 2020 to play for Juventus Under 23	
24 January 2020	FW	(Italy) Matteo Brunori	25	(Italy) Pescara	€1M	To play for Juventus Under 23	
25 January 2020	FW	(Spain) Alejandro Marqués	19	(Spain) Barcelona	€8.2M	To play for Juventus Under 23	
28 January 2020	MF	(Switzerland) Kristian Sekularac	16	(Switzerland) Servette	Undisclosed		
30 January 2020	FW	(Albania) Giacomo Vrioni	21	(Italy) Sampdoria	Undisclosed	To play for Juventus Under 23 with option to buy	
30 January 2020	DF	(Brazil) Wesley	19	(Italy) Hellas Verona	Free	To play for Juventus Under 23	
31 January 2020	DF	(Italy) Alessandro Minelli	20	(Italy) Parma	€0.5M	To play for Juventus Under 23	
31 January 2020	MF	(Argentina) Enzo Barrenechea	18	(Switzerland) Sion	Undisclosed		
31 January 2020	DF	(Sweden) Jonas Rouhi	15–16	(Sweden) Brommapojkarna	Undisclosed		

==== Other disposals ====
Date	Pos.	Player	Age	Moving to	Fee	Notes	Source
8 January 2020	FW	(North Korea) Han Kwang-song	21	(Qatar) Al-Duhail	€5M		
20 January 2020	FW	(Portugal) Dany Mota	21	(Italy) Monza	N/A	On loan until June 2020 with option to buy	
23 January 2020	MF	(Ghana) Ransford Selasi	21	(Switzerland) Lugano	N/A	On loan until June 2020	
24 January 2020	DF	(Italy) Edoardo Masciangelo	23	(Italy) Pescara	€1M	Opted to sign permanently	
25 January 2020	MF	(Brazil) Matheus Pereira	21	(Spain) Barcelona	N/A	After return from Dijon on loan until June 2020 to play for FC Barcelona B with option to buy for €8M	
27 January 2020	MF	(Italy) Stefano Beltrame	26	(Bulgaria) CSKA Sofia	Undisclosed		
30 January 2020	MF	(Italy) Nicolò Francofonte	18	(Italy) Sampdoria	N/A	On loan until June 2020 with option to buy	
30 January 2020	FW	(Italy) Erik Gerbi	19	(Italy) Sampdoria	N/A	On loan until June 2020 with option to buy	
30 January 2020	FW	(Italy) Matteo Stoppa	19	(Italy) Sampdoria	N/A	On loan until June 2020 with option to buy	
30 January 2020	FW	(Italy) Eric Lanini	25	(Italy) Parma	€0.5M	On loan to Como until June 2020	
31 January 2020	FW	(Denmark) Nikolai Frederiksen	19	(Netherlands) Fortuna Sittard	N/A	On loan until June 2020 with option to buy	
31 January 2020	MF	(Italy) Luca Clemenza	22	(Italy) Pescara	N/A	On loan until June 2020 with option to buy	
31 January 2020	DF	(Portugal) Rafael Fonseca	19	(France) Amiens	N/A	On loan until June 2020 with option to buy	

=== End of season ===
==== Other disposals ====
Date	Pos.	Player	Age	Moving to	Fee	Notes	Source
18 February 2020	MF	(Germany) Emre Can	26	(Germany) Borussia Dortmund	€25M	Opted to sign permanently with the loan still expiring June 2020	

== Pre-season and friendlies ==
21 July 2019 ICC	Juventus	2–3	Tottenham Hotspur	Kallang, Singapore
19:30 SST	Higuaín 56'; Ronaldo 60'	Report	Lamela 30'; Parrott (yellow card) 44'; Lucas 65'; Kane 90+3'	Stadium: National Stadium; Attendance: 50,443; Referee: Ahmad A'Qashah (Singapore)

24 July 2019 ICC	Juventus	1–1 (4–3 p)	Internazionale	Nanjing, China
19:30 CST	Bonucci (yellow card) 53'; Ronaldo 68'	Report	De Ligt 10' (o.g.); D'Ambrosio (yellow card) 41'	Stadium: Nanjing Olympic Sports Centre; Attendance: 48,646; Referee: Zhang Lei (China)
	Penalties
	Cancelo (penalty scored); Ronaldo (penalty scored); Can (penalty scored); Rabiot (penalty missed); Bernardeschi (penalty missed); Demiral (penalty scored)		(penalty missed) Ranocchia; (penalty scored) Puşcaş; (penalty missed) Longo; (penalty scored) João Mário; (penalty scored) Barella; (penalty missed) Valero

26 July 2019 Friendly	Team K League	3–3	Juventus	Seoul, South Korea
20:50 KST	Osmar 7'; Yoon (yellow card) 42'; Cesinha 45'; Taggart 50'	Report	Muratore 9'; Cancelo (yellow card) 40'; Matuidi 78'; Pereira 81'	Stadium: Seoul World Cup Stadium; Attendance: 63,000; Referee: Kim Dong-jin (South Korea)

7 August 2019 Friendly	Juventus	4–0	Novara	Continassa, Turin
18:30 CEST	Higuaín; Mandžukić; Dybala; De Ligt	Report		Stadium: Juventus Training Center

10 August 2019 ICC	Atlético Madrid	2–1	Juventus	Stockholm, Sweden
18:00 CEST	Lemar 24'; Félix 33'; Vitolo (yellow card) 69'; Correa (yellow card) 83'	Report	Khedira 29'	Stadium: Friends Arena; Attendance: 49,752; Referee: Andreas Ekberg (Sweden)

14 August 2019 Villar Perosa	Juventus	3–1^{[A]}	Juventus B	Villar Perosa, Italy
17:00 CEST	Dybala 15' (pen.), 45'; Cuadrado 50'	Report	Demiral 38' (o.g.)	Referee: Lorenzo Maggioni (Italy)

17 August 2019 Friendly	Triestina	0–1	Juventus	Trieste, Italy
20:30 CEST		Report	Dybala 38'	Stadium: Stadio Nereo Rocco; Referee: Luca Zufferli (Italy)

== Competitions ==
=== Overview ===
Competition	First match	Last match	Starting round	Final position	Record							
Competition	First match	Last match	Starting round	Final position	Pld	W	D	L	GF	GA	GD	Win %
Serie A	24 August 2019	1 August 2020	Matchday 1	Winners	38	26	5	7	76	43	+33	68.42
Coppa Italia	15 January 2020	17 June 2020	Round of 16	Runners-up	5	2	3	0	8	2	+6	40.00
Supercoppa Italiana	22 December 2019		Final	Runners-up	1	0	0	1	1	3	−2	0.00
Champions League	18 September 2019	7 August 2020	Group stage	Round of 16	8	6	1	1	14	6	+8	75.00
Total					52	34	9	9	99	54	+45	65.38

Source: Competitions

=== Serie A ===
==== League table ====
Pos	Team	Pld	W	D	L	GF	GA	GD	Pts	Qualification or relegation
1	Juventus (C)	38	26	5	7	76	43	+33	83	Qualification for the Champions League group stage
2	Internazionale	38	24	10	4	81	36	+45	82	Qualification for the Champions League group stage
3	Atalanta	38	23	9	6	98	48	+50	78 (Note: Atalanta finished ahead of Lazio on head-to-head points: Lazio 3–3 Atalanta, Atalanta 3–2 Lazio.)	Qualification for the Champions League group stage
4	Lazio	38	24	6	8	79	42	+37	78	Qualification for the Champions League group stage
5	Roma	38	21	7	10	77	51	+26	70	Qualification for the Europa League group stage

Source: Serie A, Soccerway
Rules for classification: 1) Points; 2) Head-to-head points; 3) Head-to-head goal difference; 4) Goal difference; 5) Goals scored; 6) Draw. (Note: Head-to-head record is used only after all the matches between the teams in question have been played)
(C) Champions

==== Results summary ====
Overall								Home						Away					
Pld	W	D	L	GF	GA	GD	Pts	W	D	L	GF	GA	GD	W	D	L	GF	GA	GD
38	26	5	7	76	43	+33	83	16	2	1	46	17	+29	10	3	6	30	26	+4

Source: Competitive matches

==== Results by round ====
Round	1	2	3	4	5	6	7	8	9	10	11	12	13	14	15	16	17	18	19	20	21	22	23	24	25	26	27	28	29	30	31	32	33	34	35	36	37	38
Ground	A	H	A	H	A	H	A	H	A	H	A	H	A	H	A	H	A	H	A	H	A	H	A	H	A	H	A	H	A	H	A	H	A	H	A	H	A	H
Result	W	W	D	W	W	W	W	W	D	W	W	W	W	D	L	W	W	W	W	W	L	W	L	W	W	W	W	W	W	W	L	D	D	W	L	W	L	L
Position	7	2	3	2	2	2	1	1	1	1	1	1	1	2	2	2	2	2	1	1	1	1	2	1	1	1	1	1	1	1	1	1	1	1	1	1	1	1

Source: Serie A schedule
A = Away; H = Home; W = Win; D = Draw; L = Loss

==== Matches ====
24 August 2019 1	Parma	0–1	Juventus	Parma
18:00 CEST (UTC+02:00)	Kulusevski (yellow card) 27'; Hernani (yellow card) 45'	Report	Chiellini 21'; Khedira (yellow card) 53'; Bernardeschi (yellow card) 88'; Pjanić (yellow card) 90+1'	Stadium: Stadio Ennio Tardini; Attendance: 20,073; Referee: Fabio Maresca

31 August 2019 2	Juventus	4–3	Napoli	Turin
20:45 CEST (UTC+02:00)	Danilo 16'; Higuaín 19'; Matuidi (yellow card) 52'; Ronaldo 62'; Alex Sandro (yellow card) 80'; Douglas Costa (yellow card) 83'; Koulibaly 90+2' (o.g.)	Report	Ghoulam (yellow card) 40'; Di Lorenzo (yellow card) 44', (goal) 81'; Manolas 66'; Lozano 68'; Elmas (yellow card) 90+1'	Stadium: Juventus Stadium; Attendance: 39,203; Referee: Daniele Orsato

14 September 2019 3	Fiorentina	0–0	Juventus	Florence
15:00 CEST (UTC+02:00)	Cáceres (yellow card) 10'; Chiesa (yellow card) 37'; Castrovilli (yellow card) 77'	Report	Pjanić (yellow card) 14'; De Ligt (yellow card) 46'; Bentancur (yellow card) 82'	Stadium: Stadio Artemio Franchi; Attendance: 40,312; Referee: Massimiliano Irrati

21 September 2019 4	Juventus	2–1	Hellas Verona	Turin
18:00 CEST (UTC+02:00)	Ramsey 31'; Ronaldo 49' (pen.)	Report	Kumbulla (yellow card) 16' (yellow-red card) 90+4'; Di Carmine (penalty missed) 20'; Veloso 21'; Rrahmani (yellow card) 28'; Faraoni (yellow card) 34'	Stadium: Juventus Stadium; Attendance: 39,945; Referee: Federico La Penna

24 September 2019 5	Brescia	1–2	Juventus	Brescia
21:00 CEST (UTC+02:00)	Donnarumma 4'; Cistana (yellow card) 79'	Report	Khedira (yellow card) 7'; Chancellor 40' (o.g.); Bonucci (yellow card) 41'; De Ligt (yellow card) 56'; Pjanić 63'	Stadium: Stadio Mario Rigamonti; Attendance: 18,500; Referee: Fabrizio Pasqua

28 September 2019 6	Juventus	2–0	SPAL	Turin
15:00 CEST (UTC+02:00)	Khedira (yellow card) 32'; Pjanić 45'; Ronaldo 78'; Can (yellow card) 90+1'	Report	Igor (yellow card) 55'; Petagna (yellow card) 82'	Stadium: Juventus Stadium; Attendance: 38,995; Referee: Marco Piccinini

6 October 2019 7	Internazionale	1–2	Juventus	Milan
20:45 CEST (UTC+02:00)	Martínez 18' (pen.); Vecino (yellow card) 88'; Barella (yellow card) 90'	Report	Dybala 4'; Alex Sandro (yellow card) 13'; Higuaín 80'; Can (yellow card) 84'; Pjanić (yellow card) 85'	Stadium: San Siro; Attendance: 75,923; Referee: Gianluca Rocchi

19 October 2019 8	Juventus	2–1	Bologna	Turin
20:45 CEST (UTC+02:00)	Ronaldo 19'; Rabiot (yellow card) 30'; Pjanić 54'; Bentancur (yellow card) 70'	Report	Sansone (yellow card) 22'; Danilo 26', (yellow card) 84'; Bani (yellow card) 90+5'	Stadium: Juventus Stadium; Attendance: 40,461; Referee: Massimiliano Irrati

26 October 2019 9	Lecce	1–1	Juventus	Lecce
15:00 CEST (UTC+02:00)	Calderoni (yellow card) 13'; Rossettini (yellow card) 18'; Mancosu 56' (pen.), (yellow card) 73'; Lapadula (yellow card) 88'	Report	Dybala 50' (pen.); Bernardeschi (yellow card) 79'	Stadium: Stadio Via del Mare; Attendance: 26,591; Referee: Paolo Valeri

30 October 2019 10	Juventus	2–1	Genoa	Turin
21:00 CET (UTC+01:00)	Bentancur (yellow card) 28'; Bonucci 36', (yellow card) 89'; Rugani (yellow card) 38'; Rabiot (yellow card) 76' (yellow-red card) 87'; Ronaldo 90+6' (pen.)	Report	Cassata (yellow card) 4' (yellow-red card) 51'; Kouamé 41'; Pandev (yellow card) 56'; Marchetti (red card) 61'	Stadium: Juventus Stadium; Attendance: 39,115; Referee: Antonio Giua
Note: Marchetti was sent off for dissent while a substitute.

2 November 2019 11	Torino	0–1	Juventus	Turin
20:45 CET (UTC+01:00)	Aina (yellow card) 44'; Ansaldi (yellow card) 63'; Baselli (yellow card) 68'; Belotti (yellow card) 90+3'	Report	Bentancur (yellow card) 54'; Cuadrado (yellow card) 57'; De Ligt 70'	Stadium: Stadio Olimpico Grande Torino; Attendance: 26,664; Referee: Daniele Doveri

10 November 2019 12	Juventus	1–0	AC Milan	Turin
20:45 CET (UTC+01:00)	Cuadrado (yellow card) 57'; Dybala 77'	Report	Krunić (yellow card) 40'; Bennacer (yellow card) 45'; Hernandez (yellow card) 89'; Çalhanoğlu (yellow card) 90+1'; Suso (yellow card) 90+1'	Stadium: Juventus Stadium; Attendance: 40,478; Referee: Fabio Maresca

23 November 2019 13	Atalanta	1–3	Juventus	Bergamo
15:00 CET (UTC+01:00)	Palomino (yellow card) 10'; Barrow (penalty missed) 17'; Freuler (yellow card) 41'; Gosens (yellow card) 45', (goal) 56'; Toloi (yellow card) 62'; Gollini (yellow card) 83'	Report	Higuaín (yellow card) 7', (goal) 74', 82'; Dybala (yellow card) 27', (goal) 90+2'; Cuadrado (yellow card) 45+2'	Stadium: Stadio Atleti Azzurri d'Italia; Attendance: 20,899; Referee: Gianluca Rocchi

1 December 2019 14	Juventus	2–2	Sassuolo	Turin
12:30 CET (UTC+01:00)	Bonucci 20'; Ronaldo 68' (pen.); Pjanić (yellow card) 88'	Report	Boga 23'; Đuričić (yellow card) 40'; Caputo 47'; Locatelli (yellow card) 65'; Toljan (yellow card) 78'; Kyriakopoulos (yellow card) 81'; Müldür (yellow card) 87'	Stadium: Juventus Stadium; Attendance: 40,597; Referee: Federico La Penna

7 December 2019 15	Lazio	3–1	Juventus	Rome
20:45 CET (UTC+01:00)	Luis Alberto (yellow card) 6'; Luiz Felipe 45+1'; Lazzari (yellow card) 63'; Milinković-Savić 74'; Immobile (penalty missed) 79'; Lucas (yellow card) 86'; Caicedo 90+5', (yellow card) 90+5'	Report	Pjanić (yellow card) 11'; Ronaldo 25'; Dybala (yellow card) 37'; Cuadrado (red card) 69'; Szczęsny (yellow card) 77'	Stadium: Stadio Olimpico; Attendance: 65,000; Referee: Michael Fabbri

15 December 2019 16	Juventus	3–1	Udinese	Turin
15:00 CET (UTC+01:00)	Ronaldo 9', 37'; Dybala (yellow card) 22'; Bonucci 45'; Bentancur (yellow card) 90+5'	Report	Nuytinck (yellow card) 40'; Pussetto 90+4'	Stadium: Juventus Stadium; Attendance: 39,127; Referee: Fabrizio Pasqua

18 December 2019 17	Sampdoria	1–2	Juventus	Genoa
18:55 CET (UTC+01:00)	Caprari 35', (yellow card) 77' (yellow-red card) 90+2'; Jankto (yellow card) 43'; Murillo (yellow card) 61'; Ramírez (yellow card) 90+6'	Report	Dybala 19'; Ronaldo 45'; Pjanić (yellow card) 59'; Demiral (yellow card) 76'	Stadium: Stadio Luigi Ferraris; Attendance: 23,136; Referee: Gianluca Rocchi

6 January 2020 18	Juventus	4–0	Cagliari	Turin
15:00 CET (UTC+01:00)	Rabiot (yellow card) 41'; Ronaldo 49', 67' (pen.), 82'; Higuaín 81'	Report	João Pedro (yellow card) 48'	Stadium: Juventus Stadium; Attendance: 40,598; Referee: Piero Giacomelli

12 January 2020 19	Roma	1–2	Juventus	Rome
20:45 CET (UTC+01:00)	Veretout (yellow card) 9'; Kolarov (yellow card) 15'; Mancini (yellow card) 26'; Perotti 68' (pen.); Cristante (yellow card) 82'; Kalinić (yellow card) 83'; Florenzi (yellow card) 90+4'	Report	Demiral 3'; Ronaldo 10' (pen.); Pjanić (yellow card) 13'; De Ligt (yellow card) 32'; Cuadrado (yellow card) 45+1'	Stadium: Stadio Olimpico; Attendance: 60,513; Referee: Marco Guida

19 January 2020 20	Juventus	2–1	Parma	Turin
20:45 CET (UTC+01:00)	Ronaldo 43', 58'	Report	Cornelius 55'; Kurtić (yellow card) 70'	Stadium: Juventus Stadium; Attendance: 37,790; Referee: Marco Di Bello

26 January 2020 21	Napoli	2–1	Juventus	Naples
20:45 CET (UTC+01:00)	Demme (yellow card) 30'; Zieliński 63'; Hysaj (yellow card) 76'; Insigne 86'	Report	Bentancur (yellow card) 61'; Rabiot (yellow card) 70'; Bernardeschi (yellow card) 81'; De Ligt (yellow card) 85'; Ronaldo 90', (yellow card) 90+3'	Stadium: Stadio San Paolo; Attendance: 39,111; Referee: Maurizio Mariani

2 February 2020 22	Juventus	3–0	Fiorentina	Turin
12:30 CET (UTC+01:00)	Bonucci (yellow card) 35'; Ronaldo 40' (pen.), 80' (pen.); De Ligt 90+1'	Report	Chiesa (yellow card) 33'; Pezzella (yellow card) 39'; Ghezzal (yellow card) 50'; Ceccherini (yellow card) 80'	Stadium: Juventus Stadium; Attendance: 40,171; Referee: Fabrizio Pasqua

8 February 2020 23	Hellas Verona	2–1	Juventus	Verona
20:45 CET (UTC+01:00)	Lazović (yellow card) 39'; Pessina (yellow card) 41'; Borini 76'; Pazzini 86' (pen.)	Report	Alex Sandro (yellow card) 20'; Ronaldo 65'; Dybala (yellow card) 75'; Bonucci (yellow card) 85'	Stadium: Stadio Marc'Antonio Bentegodi; Attendance: 28,654; Referee: Davide Massa

16 February 2020 24	Juventus	2–0	Brescia	Turin
15:00 CET (UTC+01:00)	Bonucci (yellow card) 19'; Dybala 39'; Higuaín (yellow card) 43'; Bentancur (yellow card) 65'; Cuadrado 75'	Report	Ayé (yellow card) 33' (yellow-red card) 37'	Stadium: Juventus Stadium; Attendance: 40,841; Referee: Daniele Chiffi

22 February 2020 25	SPAL	1–2	Juventus	Ferrara
18:00 CET (UTC+01:00)	Valoti (yellow card) 19'; Zukanović (yellow card) 45+1'; Petagna 69' (pen.); Espeto (yellow card) 88'; Cionek (yellow card) 90+1'	Report	Ronaldo 39'; Ramsey 60'; Matuidi (yellow card) 78'; Danilo (yellow card) 90'	Stadium: Stadio Paolo Mazza; Attendance: 15,262; Referee: Federico La Penna

8 March 2020 26	Juventus	2–0	Internazionale	Turin
20:45 CET (UTC+01:00)	Ramsey 55'; Dybala 67'; Ronaldo (yellow card) 87'	Report	Škriniar (yellow card) 64'; Vecino (yellow card) 71'; Brozović (yellow card) 79'; Padelli (red card) 80'	Stadium: Juventus Stadium; Attendance: 0 Referee: Marco Guida
Note: Match was initially postponed to 13 May from its original date of 1 March due to concerns over the COVID-19 pandemic, but was later moved to 8 March to be played behind closed doors.

22 June 2020 27	Bologna	0–2	Juventus	Bologna
21:45 CEST (UTC+02:00)	Soriano (yellow card) 35'	Report	Ronaldo 23' (pen.); Dybala 36'; De Sciglio (yellow card) 66'; Bentancur (yellow card) 69'; Danilo (yellow card) 82' (yellow-red card) 90+1'	Stadium: Stadio Renato Dall'Ara; Attendance: 0 Referee: Gianluca Rocchi
Note: Match was postponed to 13 March and then to 22 June from its original date of 8 March due to schedule shuffling to allow for Juventus vs Inter Milan to be played following its previous postponement due to concerns over the COVID-19 pandemic. All subsequent matches were also shuffled to allow for this accommodation. On 9 March, all sports events in Italy were suspended until 3 April. This was the first match played since the COVID-19 pandemic lockdown in Italy.

26 June 2020 28	Juventus	4–0	Lecce	Turin
21:45 CEST (UTC+02:00)	Bentancur (yellow card) 38'; Dybala 53'; Ronaldo 62' (pen.); Higuaín 83'; De Ligt 85'	Report	Lucioni (red card) 32'	Stadium: Juventus Stadium; Attendance: 0 Referee: Marco Piccinini

30 June 2020 29	Genoa	1–3	Juventus	Genoa
21:45 CEST (UTC+02:00)	Favilli (yellow card) 7'; Schöne (yellow card) 33'; Sturaro (yellow card) 58'; Cassata (yellow card) 70'; Pinamonti 76'; Masiello (yellow card) 80'	Report	Bonucci (yellow card) 45+2'; Dybala 50'; Ronaldo 57'; Douglas Costa 73'	Stadium: Stadio Luigi Ferraris; Attendance: 0 Referee: Gianpaolo Calvarese

4 July 2020 30	Juventus	4–1	Torino	Turin
17:15 CEST (UTC+02:00)	Dybala 3', (yellow card) 70'; Bonucci (yellow card) 26'; Cuadrado 29'; Pjanić (yellow card) 40'; De Ligt (yellow card) 45+5'; Ronaldo 61'; Djidji 87' (o.g.)	Report	Belotti 45+6' (pen.); Izzo (yellow card) 58'; Aina (yellow card) 60'	Stadium: Juventus Stadium; Attendance: 0 Referee: Fabio Maresca

7 July 2020 31	AC Milan	4–2	Juventus	Milan
21:45 CEST (UTC+02:00)	Paquetá (yellow card) 31'; Bennacer (yellow card) 36'; Rebić (yellow card) 59', (goal) 80'; Ibrahimović 62' (pen.); Kessié 66'; Leão 67'; Conti (yellow card) 73'	Report	Rabiot 47'; Ronaldo 53'; Bonucci (yellow card) 62'	Stadium: San Siro; Attendance: 0 Referee: Marco Guida

11 July 2020 32	Juventus	2–2	Atalanta	Turin
21:45 CEST (UTC+02:00)	Bernardeschi (yellow card) 10'; Cuadrado (yellow card) 29'; Ronaldo 55' (pen.), 90' (pen.); Rabiot (yellow card) 73'	Report	Zapata 16'; Pašalić (yellow card) 61'; Malinovskyi 81'; Hateboer (yellow card) 88'	Stadium: Juventus Stadium; Attendance: 0 Referee: Piero Giacomelli

15 July 2020 33	Sassuolo	3–3	Juventus	Reggio Emilia
21:45 CEST (UTC+02:00)	Đuričić 29'; Magnanelli (yellow card) 42'; Berardi 51', (yellow card) 58'; Kyriakopoulos (yellow card) 53'; Caputo 54'; Bourabia (yellow card) 90'	Report	Danilo 5'; Higuaín 12'; Bernardeschi (yellow card) 45+1'; Ronaldo (yellow card) 62'; Alex Sandro 64'; Bonucci (yellow card) 81'; Ramsey (yellow card) 90+4'	Stadium: Mapei Stadium – Città del Tricolore; Attendance: 0 Referee: Paolo Valeri

20 July 2020 34	Juventus	2–1	Lazio	Turin
21:45 CEST (UTC+02:00)	Ronaldo 51' (pen.), 54'; Alex Sandro (yellow card) 60'; Bonucci (yellow card) 82'; Danilo (yellow card) 88'	Report	Anderson (yellow card) 37'; Immobile 83' (pen.)	Stadium: Juventus Stadium; Attendance: 0 Referee: Daniele Orsato

23 July 2020 35	Udinese	2–1	Juventus	Udine
19:30 CEST (UTC+02:00)	Troost-Ekong (yellow card) 20'; Nestorovski 52'; Zeegelaar (yellow card) 68'; Fofana 90+2'	Report	Ramsey (yellow card) 1'; De Ligt 42'; Cuadrado (yellow card) 83'	Stadium: Stadio Friuli; Attendance: 0 Referee: Massimiliano Irrati

26 July 2020 36	Juventus	2–0	Sampdoria	Turin
21:45 CEST (UTC+02:00)	Pjanić (yellow card) 45'; Ronaldo 45+7', (penalty missed) 90'; Bernardeschi 67', (yellow card) 69'; Cuadrado (yellow card) 80'; Rabiot (yellow card) 86'	Report	Thorsby (yellow card) 45+3' (yellow-red card) 77'; Tonelli (yellow card) 45+6'; Jankto (yellow card) 66'; Depaoli (yellow card) 88'	Stadium: Juventus Stadium; Attendance: 0 Referee: Francesco Fourneau

29 July 2020 37	Cagliari	2–0	Juventus	Cagliari
21:45 CEST (UTC+02:00)	Gagliano 8'; Rog (yellow card) 17'; Simeone 45+2'; João Pedro (yellow card) 65'	Report	Pjanić (yellow card) 25'	Stadium: Sardegna Arena; Attendance: 0 Referee: Davide Ghersini

1 August 2020 38	Juventus	1–3	Roma	Turin
20:45 CEST (UTC+02:00)	Higuaín 5'; Rugani (yellow card) 21'	Report	Kalinić 23'; Smalling (yellow card) 40'; Perotti 44' (pen.), 52', (yellow card) 45+1'; Cristante (yellow card) 54'; Fazio (yellow card) 90+5'	Stadium: Juventus Stadium; Attendance: 0 Referee: Gianluca Rocchi

=== Coppa Italia ===
15 January 2020 Round of 16	Juventus	4–0	Udinese	Turin
20:45 CET (UTC+01:00)	Higuaín 16'; Dybala 26' (pen.), 58'; Douglas Costa 61' (pen.)	Report	Nuytinck (yellow card) 60'	Stadium: Juventus Stadium; Attendance: 39,524; Referee: Gianluca Aureliano

22 January 2020 Quarter-finals	Juventus	3–1	Roma	Turin
20:45 CET (UTC+01:00)	Ronaldo 26'; Bentancur 38'; Bonucci 45+2'; Higuaín (yellow card) 65'; Matuidi (yellow card) 80'	Report	Cristante (yellow card) 31'; Buffon 50' (o.g.)	Stadium: Juventus Stadium; Attendance: 40,791; Referee: Gianluca Rocchi

13 February 2020 Semi-finals first leg	AC Milan	1–1	Juventus	Milan
20:45 CET (UTC+01:00)	Ibrahimović (yellow card) 30'; Hernandez (yellow card) 42' (yellow-red card) 71'; Kessié (yellow card) 58'; Rebić 61'; Castillejo (yellow card) 69'; Calabria (yellow card) 90'	Report	Ramsey (yellow card) 30'; Ronaldo 90+1' (pen.)	Stadium: San Siro; Attendance: 72,738; Referee: Paolo Valeri

12 June 2020 Semi-finals second leg	Juventus	0–0 (1 (a) –1 agg.)	AC Milan	Turin
21:00 CEST (UTC+02:00)	Ronaldo (penalty missed) 17'; Pjanić (yellow card) 43'; Khedira (yellow card) 74'	Report	Conti (yellow card) 16'; Rebić (red card) 17'	Stadium: Juventus Stadium; Attendance: 0 Referee: Daniele Orsato
Note: Match was postponed to 12 June from its original date of 4 March due to concerns over the COVID-19 pandemic.

17 June 2020 Final	Napoli	0–0 (4–2 p)	Juventus	Rome
21:00 CEST (UTC+02:00)	Mário Rui (yellow card) 77'	Report	Bonucci (yellow card) 51'; Dybala (yellow card) 83'	Stadium: Stadio Olimpico; Attendance: 0 Referee: Daniele Doveri
	Penalties
	Insigne (penalty scored); Politano (penalty scored); Maksimović (penalty scored); Milik (penalty scored)		(penalty missed) Dybala; (penalty missed) Danilo; (penalty scored) Bonucci; (penalty scored) Ramsey
Note: Match was first postponed to 20 May, and then to 17 June to be played behind closed doors from its original date of 13 May due to concerns over the COVID-19 pandemic.

=== Supercoppa Italiana ===
22 December 2019	Juventus	1–3	Lazio	Riyadh, Saudi Arabia
19:45 AST	Matuidi (yellow card) 9'; Dybala 45'; Bentancur (yellow card) 48' (yellow-red card) 90+3'	Report	Luis Alberto 16', (yellow card) 58'; Lucas (yellow card) 35'; Lulić 73'; Cataldi (yellow card) 90+2', (goal) 90+4'	Stadium: King Saud University Stadium; Attendance: 23,361; Referee: Gianpaolo Calvarese

=== UEFA Champions League ===
==== Group stage ====
Pos	Team	Pld	W	D	L	GF	GA	GD	Pts	Qualification	JUV	ATM	LEV	LMO
1	(Italy) Juventus	6	5	1	0	12	4	+8	16	Advance to knockout phase	—	1–0	3–0	2–1
2	(Spain) Atlético Madrid	6	3	1	2	8	5	+3	10	Advance to knockout phase	2–2	—	1–0	2–0
3	(Germany) Bayer Leverkusen	6	2	0	4	5	9	−4	6	Transfer to Europa League	0–2	2–1	—	1–2
4	(Russia) Lokomotiv Moscow	6	1	0	5	4	11	−7	3		1–2	0–2	0–2	—

Source: UEFA
Rules for classification: Group stage tiebreakers

18 September 2019 1	Atlético Madrid (Spain)	2–2	(Italy) Juventus	Madrid, Spain
21:00 CEST (UTC+02:00)	Savić 70'; Costa (yellow card) 83'; Herrera 90'	Report	Matuidi (yellow card) 15', (goal) 65'; Cuadrado 48', (yellow card) 71'	Stadium: Metropolitano Stadium; Attendance: 66,283; Referee: Danny Makkelie (Netherlands)

1 October 2019 2	Juventus (Italy)	3–0	(Germany) Bayer Leverkusen	Turin, Italy
21:00 CEST (UTC+02:00)	Higuaín 17'; Cuadrado (yellow card) 55'; Bernardeschi 62'; Ronaldo 89'	Report	Aránguiz (yellow card) 19'	Stadium: Juventus Stadium; Attendance: 34,525; Referee: Willie Collum (Scotland)

22 October 2019 3	Juventus (Italy)	2–1	(Russia) Lokomotiv Moscow	Turin, Italy
21:00 CEST (UTC+02:00)	Matuidi (yellow card) 17'; Cuadrado (yellow card) 68'; Dybala 77', 79'	Report	Miranchuk 30'; Krychowiak (yellow card) 72'; Barinov (yellow card) 90'	Stadium: Juventus Stadium; Attendance: 38,547; Referee: Anastasios Sidiropoulos (Greece)

6 November 2019 4	Lokomotiv Moscow (Russia)	1–2	(Italy) Juventus	Moscow, Russia
18:55 CET (UTC+01:00)	Miranchuk 12'; Rybus (yellow card) 83'	Report	Ramsey 4'; Bonucci (yellow card) 39'; Douglas Costa 90+3', (yellow card) 90+3'	Stadium: RZD Arena; Attendance: 26,862; Referee: Ruddy Buquet (France)

26 November 2019 5	Juventus (Italy)	1–0	(Spain) Atlético Madrid	Turin, Italy
21:00 CET (UTC+01:00)	Bentancur (yellow card) 35'; Dybala 45+2'	Report	Hermoso (yellow card) 32'; Lodi (yellow card) 40'; Saúl (yellow card) 52'; Herrera (yellow card) 58'	Stadium: Juventus Stadium; Attendance: 40,486; Referee: Anthony Taylor (England)

11 December 2019 6	Bayer Leverkusen (Germany)	0–2	(Italy) Juventus	Leverkusen, Germany
21:00 CET (UTC+01:00)		Report	Ronaldo 75'; Higuaín 90+2'	Stadium: BayArena; Attendance: 29,542; Referee: Benoît Bastien (France)

==== Knockout phase ====
===== Round of 16 =====
26 February 2020 First leg	Lyon (France)	1–0	(Italy) Juventus	Décines-Charpieu, France
21:00 CET (UTC+01:00)	Marcelo (yellow card) 28'; Tousart 31'; Cornet (yellow card) 61'	Report		Stadium: Parc Olympique Lyonnais; Attendance: 57,335; Referee: Jesús Gil Manzano (Spain)

7 August 2020 Second leg	Juventus (Italy)	2–1 (2–2 (a) agg.)	(France) Lyon	Turin, Italy
21:00 CEST (UTC+02:00)	Cuadrado (yellow card) 31'; Ronaldo 43' (pen.), 60'; Bentancur (yellow card) 44'	Report	Depay 12' (pen.), (yellow card) 42'; Aouar (yellow card) 19'; Dubois (yellow card) 38'; Lopes (yellow card) 76'; Cornet (yellow card) 79'; Caqueret (yellow card) 87'; Marçal (yellow card) 89'	Stadium: Juventus Stadium; Attendance: 0 Referee: Felix Zwayer (Germany)
Note: Match was initially scheduled for 17 March to be played behind closed doors due to concerns over the COVID-19 pandemic. However, on 12 March, the match was postponed as the Juventus players were quarantined due to a COVID-19 pandemic in Italy. The match was rescheduled on 17 June to 7 August, and was played behind closed doors due to concerns over the COVID-19 pandemic in Europe.

== Statistics ==
=== Appearances and goals ===
No.	Pos	Nat	Player	Total		Serie A		Supercoppa Italiana		Coppa Italia		Champions League	
No.	Pos	Nat	Player	Apps	Goals	Apps	Goals	Apps	Goals	Apps	Goals	Apps	Goals
Goalkeepers
1	GK	(Poland) POL	Wojciech Szczęsny	37	0	29	0	1	0	0	0	7	0
31	GK	(Italy) ITA	Carlo Pinsoglio	1	0	0+1	0	0	0	0	0	0	0
77	GK	(Italy) ITA	Gianluigi Buffon	15	0	9	0	0	0	5	0	1	0
Defenders
2	DF	(Italy) ITA	Mattia De Sciglio	13	0	6+3	0	1	0	1	0	2	0
3	DF	(Italy) ITA	Giorgio Chiellini	4	1	3+1	1	0	0	0	0	0	0
4	DF	(Netherlands) NED	Matthijs de Ligt	39	4	26+3	4	0	0	4	0	6	0
12	DF	(Brazil) BRA	Alex Sandro	41	1	27+2	1	1	0	5	0	6	0
13	DF	(Brazil) BRA	Danilo	32	2	16+6	2	0	0	3+1	0	5+1	0
19	DF	(Italy) ITA	Leonardo Bonucci	47	4	35	3	1	0	4	1	7	0
24	DF	(Italy) ITA	Daniele Rugani	14	0	7+3	0	0	0	2	0	2	0
28	DF	(Turkey) TUR	Merih Demiral	8	1	5+1	1	1	0	0	0	1	0
47	DF	(Italy) ITA	Gianluca Frabotta	1	0	1	0	0	0	0	0	0	0
Midfielders
5	MF	(Bosnia and Herzegovina) BIH	Miralem Pjanić	43	3	28+2	3	1	0	4	0	8	0
6	MF	(Germany) GER	Sami Khedira	19	0	9+3	0	0+1	0	0+1	0	4+1	0
8	MF	(Wales) WAL	Aaron Ramsey	35	4	11+13	3	0+1	0	1+3	0	2+4	1
14	MF	(France) FRA	Blaise Matuidi	45	1	23+12	0	1	0	3+1	0	4+1	1
25	MF	(France) FRA	Adrien Rabiot	37	1	21+7	1	0	0	2+2	0	4+1	0
30	MF	(Uruguay) URU	Rodrigo Bentancur	43	0	25+5	0	1	0	4+1	0	4+3	0
38	MF	(Italy) ITA	Simone Muratore	5	0	2+2	0	0	0	0	0	0+1	0
43	MF	(Belgium) BEL	Daouda Peeters	1	0	0+1	0	0	0	0	0	0	0
Forwards
7	FW	(Portugal) POR	Cristiano Ronaldo	46	37	33	31	1	0	4	2	8	4
10	FW	(Argentina) ARG	Paulo Dybala	46	17	25+8	11	1	1	4	2	3+5	3
11	FW	(Brazil) BRA	Douglas Costa	29	3	7+16	1	0+1	0	4	1	0+1	1
16	FW	(Colombia) COL	Juan Cuadrado	45	3	28+5	2	0+1	0	2+3	0	6	1
21	FW	(Argentina) ARG	Gonzalo Higuaín	44	11	20+12	8	1	0	2+1	1	5+3	2
33	FW	(Italy) ITA	Federico Bernardeschi	38	2	19+10	1	0	0	1+2	0	3+3	1
35	FW	(Italy) ITA	Marco Olivieri	4	0	0+3	0	0	0	0	0	0+1	0
44	FW	(Albania) ALB	Giacomo Vrioni	1	0	0+1	0	0	0	0	0	0	0
46	FW	(Italy) ITA	Luca Zanimacchia	2	0	1+1	0	0	0	0	0	0	0
Players transferred/loaned out during the season
37	GK	(Italy) ITA	Mattia Perin	0	0	0	0	0	0	0	0	0	0
23	MF	(Germany) GER	Emre Can	8	0	2+6	0	0	0	0	0	0	0
17	FW	(Croatia) CRO	Mario Mandžukić	0	0	0	0	0	0	0	0	0	0
20	FW	(Croatia) CRO	Marko Pjaca	1	0	0	0	0	0	0+1	0	0	0

Last updated: 7 August 2020
Source: Competitions

=== Goalscorers ===
Rank	No.	Pos	Nat	Name	Serie A	Supercoppa	Coppa Italia	UEFA CL	Total
1	7	FW	(Portugal)	Cristiano Ronaldo	31	0	2	4	37
2	10	FW	(Argentina)	Paulo Dybala	11	1	2	3	17
3	21	FW	(Argentina)	Gonzalo Higuaín	8	0	1	2	11
4	19	DF	(Italy)	Leonardo Bonucci	3	0	1	0	4
4	8	MF	(Wales)	Aaron Ramsey	3	0	0	1	4
4	4	DF	(Netherlands)	Matthijs de Ligt	4	0	0	0	4
7	5	MF	(Bosnia and Herzegovina)	Miralem Pjanić	3	0	0	0	3
7	11	FW	(Brazil)	Douglas Costa	1	0	1	1	3
7	16	FW	(Colombia)	Juan Cuadrado	2	0	0	1	3
10	13	DF	(Brazil)	Danilo	2	0	0	0	2
10	33	FW	(Italy)	Federico Bernardeschi	1	0	0	1	2
12	3	DF	(Italy)	Giorgio Chiellini	1	0	0	0	1
12	12	DF	(Brazil)	Alex Sandro	1	0	0	0	1
12	14	MF	(France)	Blaise Matuidi	0	0	0	1	1
12	25	MF	(France)	Adrien Rabiot	1	0	0	0	1
12	28	DF	(Turkey)	Merih Demiral	1	0	0	0	1
12	30	MF	(Uruguay)	Rodrigo Bentancur	0	0	1	0	1
Own goal					3	0	0	0	3
Totals					76	1	8	14	99

Last updated: 7 August 2020

=== Disciplinary record ===
No.	Pos	Nat	Name	Serie A			Supercoppa			Coppa Italia			UEFA CL			Total		
No.	Pos	Nat	Name	Booked	(yellow card) (yellow-red card)	Sent off (straight red)	Booked	(yellow card) (yellow-red card)	Sent off (straight red)	Booked	(yellow card) (yellow-red card)	Sent off (straight red)	Booked	(yellow card) (yellow-red card)	Sent off (straight red)	Booked	(yellow card) (yellow-red card)	Sent off (straight red)
1	GK	(Poland)	Wojciech Szczęsny	1	0	0	0	0	0	0	0	0	0	0	0	1	0	0
31	GK	(Italy)	Carlo Pinsoglio	0	0	0	0	0	0	0	0	0	0	0	0	0	0	0
77	GK	(Italy)	Gianluigi Buffon	0	0	0	0	0	0	0	0	0	0	0	0	0	0	0
2	DF	(Italy)	Mattia De Sciglio	0	0	0	0	0	0	0	0	0	0	0	0	0	0	0
3	DF	(Italy)	Giorgio Chiellini	0	0	0	0	0	0	0	0	0	0	0	0	0	0	0
4	DF	(Netherlands)	Matthijs de Ligt	2	0	0	0	0	0	0	0	0	0	0	0	2	0	0
12	DF	(Brazil)	Alex Sandro	2	0	0	0	0	0	0	0	0	0	0	0	2	0	0
13	DF	(Brazil)	Danilo	1	1	0	0	0	0	0	0	0	0	0	0	0	0	0
19	DF	(Italy)	Leonardo Bonucci	2	0	0	0	0	0	0	0	0	1	0	0	3	0	0
24	DF	(Italy)	Daniele Rugani	1	0	0	0	0	0	0	0	0	0	0	0	1	0	0
28	DF	(Turkey)	Merih Demiral	1	0	0	0	0	0	0	0	0	0	0	0	1	0	0
5	MF	(Bosnia and Herzegovina)	Miralem Pjanić	6	0	0	0	0	0	0	0	0	0	0	0	6	0	0
6	MF	(Germany)	Sami Khedira	3	0	0	0	0	0	0	0	0	0	0	0	3	0	0
8	MF	(Wales)	Aaron Ramsey	0	0	0	0	0	0	0	0	0	0	0	0	0	0	0
14	MF	(France)	Blaise Matuidi	1	0	0	1	0	0	0	0	0	2	0	0	4	0	0
25	MF	(France)	Adrien Rabiot	2	1	0	0	0	0	0	0	0	0	0	0	2	1	0
30	MF	(Uruguay)	Rodrigo Bentancur	5	0	0	0	1	0	0	0	0	1	0	0	6	1	0
7	FW	(Portugal)	Cristiano Ronaldo	0	0	0	0	0	0	0	0	0	0	0	0	0	0	0
10	FW	(Argentina)	Paulo Dybala	3	0	0	0	0	0	0	0	0	0	0	0	3	0	0
11	FW	(Brazil)	Douglas Costa	1	0	0	0	0	0	0	0	0	1	0	0	2	0	0
16	FW	(Colombia)	Juan Cuadrado	3	0	1	0	0	0	0	0	0	3	0	0	6	0	1
21	FW	(Argentina)	Gonzalo Higuaín	1	0	0	0	0	0	0	0	0	0	0	0	1	0	0
33	FW	(Italy)	Federico Bernardeschi	2	0	0	0	0	0	0	0	0	0	0	0	2	0	0
Players transferred/loaned out during the season
37	GK	(Italy)	Mattia Perin	0	0	0	0	0	0	0	0	0	0	0	0	0	0	0
23	MF	(Germany)	Emre Can	2	0	0	0	0	0	0	0	0	0	0	0	2	0	0
17	FW	(Croatia)	Mario Mandžukić	0	0	0	0	0	0	0	0	0	0	0	0	0	0	0
20	FW	(Croatia)	Marko Pjaca	0	0	0	0	0	0	0	0	0	0	0	0	0	0	0
Totals				38	1	1	1	1	0	0	0	0	8	0	0	47	2	1

Last updated: 6 January 2020

== See also ==
- 2019–20 Juventus F.C. (women) season
- 2019–20 Juventus F.C. Under-23 season

== Notes ==
A. The match was called off at the 51st minute due to the annual tradition of pitch invasion.
