= 2021–22 Coupe de France preliminary rounds, Auvergne-Rhône-Alpes =

The 2021–22 Coupe de France preliminary rounds, Auvergne-Rhône-Alpes was the qualifying competition to decide which teams from the leagues of the Auvergne-Rhône-Alpes region of France took part in the main competition from the seventh round.

A total of nineteen teams qualified from the Auvergne-Rhône-Alpes preliminary rounds. In 2020–21, GFA Rumilly-Vallières progressed furthest in the main competition, becoming the first fourth tier side to reach the semi-final by beating Toulouse in the quarter-finals, before losing to Monaco.

== Draws and fixtures ==
On 10 August 2021, the league announced that a record 947 clubs had entered the competition from the region. The draw for the first round, featuring 836 teams from the district leagues and Régional 3, was made on 2 August 2021. Nine clubs in scope were exempted to the second round. The second round draw was published on 23 August 2021, with the exempted clubs and clubs from Régional 2 entering. The third round draw took place on 8 September 2021, and saw the Régional 1 and Championnat National 3 teams entering. The fourth round draw took place on 22 September 2021, and saw the Championnat National 2 teams entering. The fifth round draw, which saw the Championnat National teams entering, was made on 6 October 2021. The sixth round draw was made on 21 October 2021.

=== First round ===
These matches were played on 28 and 29 August 2021.

First round results: Auvergne-Rhône-Alpes
Tie no	Home team (tier)	Score	Away team (tier)
1.	FC Est Allier (11)	2–5	SC Gannat (9)
2.	SC Ygrandais (11)	0–8	Stade Saint-Yorre (9)
3.	AS Néris (12)	0–4	US Abrest (11)
4.	CS Targetois (13)	0–1	FC Creuzier-le-Neuf (12)
5.	AS Neuilly-le-Réal (11)	1–1 (5–4 p)	CS Vaux-Estivareilles (11)
6.	Espoir Molinetois (11)	3–0 (Note: Tie won by means of forfeit.)	AS Toulonnaise (10)
7.	US Vallon (10)	0–0 (6–5 p)	US Lignerolles-Lavault Sainte-Anne Prémilhat (8)
8.	AS Val de Sioule (10)	0–4	AS Louchy (8)
9.	US Varennes-sur-Tèche (10)	0–3	Bézenet-Doyet Foot (8)
10.	FC Souvigny (10)	3–2	SC Avermes (8)
11.	AS Gennetinoise (10)	2–2 (5–6 p)	AS Varennes-sur-Allier (8)
12.	Montluçon FC (11)	1–2	US Vendat (8)
13.	Jaligny Vaumas Foot (10)	2–3	AC Creuzier-le-Vieux (8)
14.	US Bien-Assis (11)	3–2	AS Tronget (10)
15.	ES Montagne Bourbonnaise (11)	3–0	AS Sanssat (12)
16.	Ballon Beaulonnais (10)	0–4	AS Dompierroise (9)
17.	US Trezelles (10)	2–1	ES Vernetoise (9)
18.	FC Haut d'Allier (10)	2–1	US Marcillat-Pionsat (10)
19.	CS Chantelle (11)	0–4	US Chevagnes (11)
20.	US Toque Huriel (11)	3–3 (3–0 p)	OC Monetay-sur-Allier (11)
21.	US Saint-Victor-Malescours (11)	0–0 (3–4 p)	Magnet/Seuillet/Saint-Gérand-le-Puy Foot (11)
22.	ES Saint-Étienne-de-Vicq/Bost (12)	0–1	FC Billy-Crechy (10)
23.	US Malicorne (11)	0–3	Étoile Moulins Yzeure (9)
24.	FR Pouzy-Mésangy (11)	0–7	Bourbon Sportif (9)
25.	AS Rongères (11)	0–1	AL Quinssaines (10)
26.	US Bussetoise (12)	0–7	Commentry FC (9)
27.	US Coeur Allier (12)	4–3	Médiéval Club Montluçonnais (9)
28.	CS Thielois (12)	2–1	Vigilante Garnat Saint-Martin (9)
29.	AS Saint-Loup (12)	2–1	CS Cosne d'Allier (9)
30.	Entente Pierrefitte/Saligny Foot (11)	2–2 (7–8 p)	JS Neuvy (9)
31.	AF Archignat-Treignat (12)	0–2	US Saulcet-Le Theil (11)
32.	Entente Lurcy-Lévis/Cérilly (10)	0–1	US Biachette Désertines (10)
33.	AS Chassenard Luneau (11)	1–1 (6–5 p)	CS Bessay (9)
34.	AS Boucetoise (10)	1–2	AC Franco-Algérienne (10)
35.	Saint-Georges SL (11)	2–0	FC Artense (9)
36.	ES Margeride (11)	0–2	FC Moussages (9)
37.	AS Chaudes-Aigues (11)	0–0 (3–4 p)	Carladez-Goul Sportif (9)
38.	US Cère et Landes (10)	1–2	FC Junhac-Montsalvy (10)
39.	AS Pleaux-Rilhac-Barriac (10)	1–2	AS Yolet (9)
40.	US La Chapelle-Laurent (10)	5–2	Cère FC Vic/Polminhac (10)
41.	FC Albepierre-Bredons (12)	0–6	FC des Quatre Vallées (9)
42.	AS Neussargues (12)	0–5	ES Pierrefortaise (8)
43.	ES Vebret-Ydes (11)	2–2 (8–7 p)	CS Arpajonnais (8)
44.	US Haut Célé (11)	0–3	Parlan-Le Rouget FC (8)
45.	US Besse (11)	0–2	Sud Cantal Foot (8)
46.	Jordanne FC (11)	2–3	ES Riomois-Condat (9)
47.	Aspre FC Fontanges (13)	2–1	FC Minier (10)
48.	US Giou de Mamou (13)	0–5	ES Saint-Mamet (9)
49.	AS Naucelles (12)	1–6	CS Vézac (9)
50.	AS Trizac (12)	0–4	AS Espinat (9)
51.	FC Hauts de Cère (12)	0–5	AS Sansacoise (8)
52.	US Loupiac Saint-Christophe (12)	0–3	AS Belbexoise (9)
53.	AS Saint-Poncy (12)	0–3	US Murat (8)
54.	ES Roannaise (12)	0–8	US Crandelles (9)
55.	FC Paulhaguet (10)	0–3	FC Massiac-Molompize-Blesle (10)
56.	US Vals Le Puy (9)	2–0	AS Saint-Didier-Saint-Just (8)
57.	FC Tence (10)	2–3	FC Saint-Germain-Laprade (10)
58.	AS Mazet-Chambon (11)	0–1	AS Grazac-Lapte (9)
59.	AS Saint-Pierre-Eynac (10)	0–4	Seauve Sports (8)
60.	CO Coubon (10)	1–6	Vigilante Saint-Pal-de-Mons (10)
61.	US Bassoise (10)	2–2 (2–4 p)	Olympic Saint-Julien-Chapteuil (8)
62.	US Landos (9)	2–3	US Fontannoise (8)
63.	AS Saugues (11)	0–2	AS Laussonne (9)
64.	Aiguilhe FC (11)	0–3	FC Dunières (8)
65.	AS Ally-Mercoeur (11)	3–5	AS Saint-Vidal (10)
66.	FC Arzon (10)	3–1	US Arsac-en-Velay (9)
67.	FC Vézézoux (10)	1–4	AS Chadrac (8)
68.	US Montfaucon Montregard Raucoules (10)	0–0 (4–2 p)	Sauveteurs Brivois (8)
69.	Olympique Malrevers (13)	1–11	FC Aurec (10)
70.	AS Riotord (12)	0–5	FJEP Freycenets Saint-Jeures (10)
71.	AA Saint-Front (13)	0–4	AS Villettoise (9)
72.	AS Saint-Pal-de-Chalencon (12)	0–7	US Bains-Saint-Christophe (9)
73.	AS Pertuis (11)	2–2 (4–2 p)	Solignac-Cussac FC (9)
74.	FC Venteuges (12)	0–6	AS Cheminots Langeac (9)
75.	AS Haute-Dordogne (10)	1–3	FF Chappes (11)
76.	ES Champeyroux-Surat-Les Martres (11)	0–4	US Chapdes-Beaufort (10)
77.	ES Couze Pavin (11)	4–2	RS Luzillat-Charnat-Vinzelles (10)
78.	Pérignat FC (11)	1–3	US Limons (10)
79.	AS Roche-Blanche FC (11)	3–1	RC Saint-Clément-de-Régnat (10)
80.	AS Portugais Riom (11)	1–3	US Gervasienne (10)
81.	ACS Cappadoce (11)	2–0	AL Glaine-Montaigut (10)
82.	FC Mezel (11)	0–2	CS Pont-de-Dore (10)
83.	US Messeix Bourg-Lastic (11)	2–1	FC Nord Combraille (10)
84.	FC Sayat Argnat (11)	3–2	RAS Beauregard l'Évêque (10)
85.	FC Bromont-Lamothe/Montfermy (11)	2–1	Durolle Foot (10)
86.	ES Volcans Malauzat (11)	1–1 (4–5 p)	CS Saint-Bonnet-près-Riom (10)
87.	CO Veyre-Monton (10)	1–2	SC Billom (9)
88.	FC Plauzat-Champeix (10)	0–3	US Bassin Minier (9)
89.	Haute Combraille Foot (11)	0–14	FC Nord Limagne (9)
90.	FC Saint-Julien-de-Coppel (10)	1–2	AS Job (9)
91.	US Val de Couze Chambon (10)	0–1	FC Sauxillanges Saint-Babel Brenat (9)
92.	US Courpière (9)	1–6	Espérance Ceyratois Football (8)
93.	FC Aubierois (9)	0–2	Dômes-Sancy Foot (8)
94.	Clermont Ouvoimoja (10)	4–3	US Ennezat (9)
95.	FC Martres-Lussat (9)	2–1	US Maringues (8)
96.	ÉS Saint-Rémy-sur-Durolle (10)	0–7	AS Saint-Genès-Champanelle (8)
97.	AS Romagnat (9)	1–2	US Saint-Beauzire (8)
98.	ES Saint-Germinoise (8)	0–2	AS Enval-Marsat (8)
99.	AS Orcines (9)	0–4	EFC Saint-Amant-Tallende (8)
100.	US Beauregard-Vendon (12)	4–0	US Menat-Neuf-Eglise (12)
101.	AS Livradois Sud (9)	2–2 (2–4 p)	UJ Clermontoise (8)
102.	CS Saint-Anthème (12)	1–4	AS Moissat (10)
103.	Clermont Outre-Mer (10)	1–0	US Orcet (9)
104.	US Tours-sur-Meymont (12)	2–4	FC Lezoux (9)
105.	FC Blanzat (9)	1–2	FC Vertaizon (8)
106.	ALS Besse Egliseneuve (9)	0–6	US Les Martres-de-Veyre (8)
107.	Ecureuils Franc Rosier (9)	5–0	US Saint-Georges / Les Ancizes (8)
108.	Clermont Métropole FC (9)	3–5	US Vic-le-Comte (8)
109.	Aulnat Sportif (12)	3–0	AS Royat (10)
110.	Entente Charblot (11)	1–5	US Gerzat (9)
111.	US Combronde (12)	3–4	FC Mirefleurs (10)
112.	FC Paslières-Noalhat (12)	1–3	AS Cunlhat (11)
113.	RC Charbonnières-Paugnat (10)	3–3 (4–2 p)	JS Saint-Priest-des-Champs (9)
114.	FC Augerollois (13)	0–0 (2–3 p)	US Ménétrol (12)
115.	AS Sugères (12)	0–2	AS Cellule (9)
116.	AS Pontgibaud (13)	0–3	AS Saint-Ours (10)
117.	US Saint-Sylvestre-Pragoulin (13)	1–4	Saint-Amant et Tallende SC (12)
118.	JS Bresse Dombes (12)	1–6	AS Hautecourt-Romanèche (11)
119.	Olympique Saint-Denis-lès-Bourg (11)	1–5	Olympique Sud Revermont 01 (10)
120.	FC Nurieux-Volognat (12)	0–4	ES Revermontoise (10)
121.	CSJ Châtillonnaise (11)	0–2	FC Côtière-Luenaz (10)
122.	Côtière Meximieux Villieu (12)	2–2 (5–4 p)	US Izernore (10)
123.	SC Mille Étangs (12)	0–1	FC Saint-Maurice-de-Gourdans (11)
124.	FC Veyle-Vieux-Jonc (12)	1–1 (7–8 p)	ES Val de Saône (10)
125.	FC Dombes (10)	2–0 (Note: Tie reversed from original draw.)	ISN FC Chaniens (13)
126.	CS Valromey (13)	1–4	Entente Bas Bugey Rhône (11)
127.	FC Priay (12)	1–2	FC Montluel (13)
128.	FC Mas-Rillier (12)	0–3	AS Portugaise Vaulx-en-Velin (10)
129.	Concordia FC Bellegarde (10)	1–2	US Arbent Marchon (8)
130.	AS Bâgé-le-Châtel (10)	1–2	FC Bressans (8)
131.	US Replonges (10)	0–3	FC Veyle Sâone (8)
132.	FC Curtafond-Confrançon-Saint-Martin-Saint-Didier (10)	3–1	Plaine Revermont Foot (9)
133.	Bourg Sud (9)	4–1	AS Saint-Laurentin (10)
134.	Olympique Rives de l'Ain-Pays du Cerdon (9)	1–4	CS Viriat (8)
135.	Saint-Denis-Ambutrix FC (10)	0–2	CS Belley (9)
136.	Bresse Foot 01 (10)	0–1	FC Plaine Tonique (9)
137.	US Veyziat (11)	3–6	Ambérieu FC (9)
138.	AS Attignat (10)	2–1	ES Foissiat-Étrez (8)
139.	FC Artemare (13)	0–3	FC Saint-Vulbas Plaine de l'Ain (10)
140.	CO Plateau (12)	2–4	Entente Saint-Martin-du-Frêne/Maillat/Combe du Val (11)
141.	FO Leymentais (13)	1–2	Olympique Buyatin (11)
142.	AS Chaveyriat-Chanoz (11)	2–2 (2–3 p)	FC Manziat (10)
143.	FC Injoux-Génissiat (12)	0–3	Valserine FC (11)
144.	Association des Portugais d'Oyonnax (12)	1–6	AS Montréal-la-Cluse (9)
145.	JS Bettant (13)	0–5	US Vaux-en-Bugey (12)
146.	AS Travailleurs Turcs Oyonnax (11)	6–2	ES Ambronay-Saint-Jean-le-Vieux (10)
147.	US Culoz Grand Colombier (10)	0–3	Oyonnax Plastics Vallée FC (8)
148.	FC Dombes-Bresse (9)	1–1 (4–2 p)	Olympique Belleroche Villefranche (8)
149.	Jassans-Frans Foot (9)	3–3 (3–4 p)	Belleville Football Beaujolais (8)
150.	FO Bourg-en-Bresse (9)	1–1 (1–4 p)	Caluire SC (8)
151.	Foot Trois Rivières (11)	2–3	AS Genay (11)
152.	Chazay FC (10)	0–3	SC Portes de l'Ain (9)
153.	Fareins Saône Vallée Foot (10)	0–3	ÉS Liergues (9)
154.	FC Serrières-Villebois (11)	1–4	AS Diémoz (10)
155.	US Dombes-Chalamont (11)	1–1 (4–5 p)	FC Rive Droite (10)
156.	CS Chevroux (11)	1–5	Beaujolais Football (10)
157.	FC Reneins Vauxonne (11)	8–0	FC Bresse Nord (10)
158.	AS Saint-Étienne-sur-Chalaronne (12)	5–0	AS Limas (11)
159.	FC Denicé Arnas (11)	1–0	FC Bord de Veyle (11)
160.	AS Grièges Pont de Veyle (12)	3–0	RC Béligny (11)
161.	US Formans (12)	3–0	ES Cormoranche (11)
162.	AS Guéreins-Genouilleux (11)	1–1 (3–4 p)	ASA Clochemerle (11)
163.	Le Grand-Lemps/Colombe/Apprieu Foot 38 (12)	2–4	Beaucroissant FC (11)
164.	Moirans FC (12)	3–0	US Montgasconnaise (11)
165.	Vourey Sports (13)	3–2	FOC Froges (12)
166.	CA Goncelin (13)	0–6	AS Fontaine (12)
167.	US Abbaye (13)	3–0	Deux Rochers FC (11)
168.	AS Cessieu (12)	2–2 (2–4 p)	FC Virieu-Valondras (11)
169.	FC Bourg-d'Oisans (12)	1–2	UO Portugal Saint-Martin-d'Hères (10)
170.	FC Sud Isère (10)	1–1 (7–8 p)	FC Vallée de la Gresse (8)
171.	CS Voreppe (10)	2–2 (7–6 p)	AJA Villeneuve (9)
172.	AS Grésivaudan (11)	1–1 (4–3 p)	ASJF Domène (10)
173.	FC Canton de Vinay (12)	1–3	Rives SF (10)
174.	ASF Portugais (11)	7–0	FC Bilieu (11)
175.	FC Vallée Bleue (12)	4–5	Olympique Les Avenières (10)
176.	FC Saint-Martin-d'Uriage (12)	2–4	JS Saint-Georgeoise (11)
177.	US Beauvoir-Royas (11)	0–2	Isle d'Abeau FC (10)
178.	US Cassolards Passageois (12)	2–1	ASCOL Foot 38 (11)
179.	CF Estrablin (9)	0–3	AS Bron Grand Lyon (8)
180.	US Creys-Morestel (10)	1–5	FC Colombier-Satolas (9)
181.	US La Murette (9)	3–3 (3–5 p)	FC Chaponnay-Marennes (8)
182.	JS Cellieu (10)	4–2	FC Grigny (9)
183.	Ménival FC (9)	1–1 (5–4 p)	FC Val Lyonnais (8)
184.	AS Toussieu (11)	3–0	AS Algerienne Villeurbanne (8)
185.	FC Point du Jour (10)	1–2	FC Pays de l'Arbresle (9)
186.	Rhône Sud FC (11)	0–2	CS Meginand (9)
187.	US Vaulx-en-Velin (11)	1–2	Feyzin Club Belle Étoile (8)
188.	AS Bellecour-Perrache (8)	13–1	FC Saint-Fons (11)
189.	JS Irigny (9)	0–3	US Meyzieu (8)
190.	SC Maccabi Lyon (11)	1–7	UGA Lyon-Décines (9)
191.	AS Buers Villeurbanne (11)	4–4 (2–4 p)	AS Villeurbanne Éveil Lyonnais (9)
192.	US Des Monts (11)	0–2	ASC Générale Routière Maïa Sonnier (11)
193.	FC Sud Ouest 69 (10)	1–1 (1–3 p)	ES Genas Azieu (9)
194.	ES Saint-Priest (10)	3–1	Olympique Rillieux (9)
195.	ES Gleizé (11)	1–1 (6–5 p)	Savigny FC (10)
196.	USC Lyon Vaise (10)	1–7	ACS Mayotte du Rhône (11)
197.	USM Pierre-Bénite (10)	0–2	AS Saint-Martin-en-Haut (9)
198.	CO Saint-Fons (9)	1–1 (5–4 p)	AS Craponne (8)
199.	AS Quatre Vents Trèves (13)	2–4	US Montanay (11)
200.	FC Meys-Grézieu (9)	2–2 (3–4 p)	US Millery-Vourles (8)
201.	FC Sourcieux-les-Mines (11)	3–2	FC Lamure Poule (10)
202.	FC La Giraudière (11)	1–1 (8–7 p)	ASM Saint-Pierre-la-Palud (10)
203.	FC Sévenne (9)	5–0	Mions FC (8)
204.	FC Corbas (9)	0–5	Sporting Nord-Isère (8)
205.	FC Antillais Villeurbanne (13)	2–1	FC Franchevillois (11)
206.	Association Chandieu-Heyrieux (9)	3–1	CS Verpillière (8)
207.	JSO Givors (10)	2–1	US Est Lyonnais (9)
208.	AS Écully (12)	0–8	FC Fontaines-sur-Saône (10)
209.	Latino AFC Lyon (12)	1–1 (3–2 p)	Éveil de Lyon (10)
210.	US Loire-Saint-Romain (10)	6–3	AS Locataires de Bans FC (12)
211.	US Villette-d'Anthon-Janneyrais (13)	2–2 (5–4 p)	Muroise Foot (11)
212.	SC Revolée (13)	4–3	FC Ternay (12)
213.	ES Frontonas-Chamagnieu (11)	1–2	Saint-Alban Sportif (10)
214.	FC Bully (12)	0–2	AS Saint-Forgeux (10)
215.	Lyon Croix Rousse Football (11)	3–0	ES Charly Foot (10)
216.	CS Vaulxois (11)	0–5	FC Croix Roussien (10)
217.	AS Sornins Réunis (12)	3–0	USF Tarare (11)
218.	Chambost-Allières-Saint-Just-d'Avray (12)	6–2	FC Saint-Romain-de-Popey (10)
219.	CS Ozon (11)	4–0	AS Manissieux (10)
220.	FC Franc Lyonnais (11)	1–3	CAS Cheminots Oullins Lyon (10)
221.	US Côteaux Lyonnais (11)	2–1	FC Pontcharra-Saint-Loup (8)
222.	FC Sainte-Foy-lès-Lyon (10)	0–5	SO Pont-de-Chéruy-Chavanoz (8)
223.	Sud Azergues Foot (10)	0–4	Stade Amplepuisien (8)
224.	FC Mont Brouilly (9)	4–1	ES Chaponost (9)
225.	AS Rhodanienne (10)	1–1 (2–3 p)	AL Saint-Maurice-l'Exil (9)
226.	AS Pusignan (11)	0–3	FC Gerland Lyon (10)
227.	Olympique Vaulx-en-Venlin (10)	5–2	Lyon Ouest SC (9)
228.	Claix Football (12)	3–4	US Village Olympique Grenoble (11)
229.	FC Tignieu-Jameyzieu (11)	0–3	US Corbelin (10)
230.	Olympique Villefontaine (10)	1–3	AS Vézeronce-Huert (9)
231.	Noyarey FC (10)	2–2 (5–4 p)	FC Allobroges Asafia (9)
232.	US Sassenage (9)	0–3	FC Varèze (8)
233.	US Saint-Paul-de-Varces (11)	1–4	US Jarrie-Champ (9)
234.	EF des Étangs (11)	1–1 (2–3 p)	AS Tullins-Fures (10)
235.	CS Miribel (11)	1–1 (3–4 p)	US Ruy Montceau (10)
236.	AS Crossey (12)	3–0	AS Saint-Joseph-de-Rivière (11)
237.	Eyzin Saint-Sorlin FC (12)	0–1	Union Nord Iséroise (10)
238.	FC Lauzes (10)	0–1	FC Balmes Nord-Isère (9)
239.	FC Velanne (12)	2–6	Artas Charantonnay FC (10)
240.	US Chatte (12)	2–0	US Ro-Claix (10)
241.	ES Bizonnes-Belmont (12)	0–3	FC La Sure (10)
242.	US Saint-Geoire-en-Valdaine (12)	3–0	Stade Chabonnais (10)
243.	AS Italienne Européenne Grenoble (9)	1–0	FC Voiron-Moirans (8)
244.	Formafoot Bièvre Valloire (9)	2–2 (5–6 p)	Vallée du Guiers FC (8)
245.	AS Saint-André-le-Gaz (9)	1–2	AS Domarin (8)
246.	FC Crolles-Bernin (9)	2–2 (4–2 p)	AS Ver Sau (8)
247.	ASL Saint-Cassien (9)	1–2	FC Seyssins (8)
248.	FC Versoud (9)	2–4	OC Eybens (8)
249.	US Dolomoise (10)	0–1	Olympique Nord Dauphiné (8)
250.	CS Faramans (10)	0–1	ES Rachais (8)
251.	FC Agnin (12)	0–5	AS Saint-Lattier (11)
252.	FC Vallée de l'Hien (11)	3–0	Saint-Martin-d'Hères FC (9)
253.	AC Poisat (11)	1–1 (3–4 p)	MJC Saint-Hilaire-de-la-Côte (11)
254.	Eclose Châteauvilain Badinières Football (11)	5–4	FC des Collines (10)
255.	FC Chirens (12)	1–1 (4–2 p)	AS Cheyssieu (12)
256.	ÉS Montrondaise (11)	0–3	FC Saint-Étienne (8)
257.	ABH FC (12)	3–2	FC Montagnes du Matin (10)
258.	FC Bords de Loire (11)	1–5	AS Savigneux-Montbrison (8)
259.	ES Saint-Christo-Marcenod (10)	0–0 (2–4 p)	Sorbiers-La Talaudière (8)
260.	AS Aveizieux (10)	1–1 (5–6 p)	Anzieux Foot (8)
261.	AS Saint-Ferréol Gampille Firminy (12)	0–8	Olympique Saint-Étienne (11)
262.	FC Bonson-Saint-Cyprien (12)	3–3 (4–2 p)	OC Ondaine (11)
263.	US Bussières (11)	1–3	Feu Vert Saint-Chamond (11)
264.	FC Saint-Joseph-Saint-Martin (10)	1–3	Olympique Le Coteau (10)
265.	AS La Chaumière (13)	0–4	Montreynaud 42 (13)
266.	Saint-Étienne UC Terrenoire (11)	1–1 (3–4 p)	Sury SC (10)
267.	ES Haut Forez (12)	3–0	US Villars (8)
268.	US Métare Saint-Étienne Sud Est (11)	2–0	AS Châteauneuf (9)
269.	Périgneux Saint-Maurice Foot (11)	1–3	GS Dervaux Chambon-Feugerolles (9)
270.	FC Marcellinois (12)	1–12	AS Algérienne Chambon-Feugerolles (9)
271.	CO La Rivière (11)	3–0	Olympique du Montcel (9)
272.	FC Genilac (12)	1–2	AF Pays de Coise (9)
273.	AS Noirétable (11)	1–4	CS Crémeaux (10)
274.	US Filerin (11)	3–3 (4–3 p)	Roanne AS Parc du Sport (8)
275.	FC Perreux (11)	0–6	FC Loire Sornin (10)
276.	AS Astrée (12)	1–6	FCI Saint-Romain-le-Puy (10)
277.	FC Boisset-Chalain (10)	2–3	USG La Fouillouse (8)
278.	FC Bourguisan (10)	3–1	AC Rive-de-Gier (8)
279.	Lignon FC (11)	0–0 (4–5 p)	ES Champdieu-Marcilly (10)
280.	SS Ussonaise (11)	1–1 (5–4 p)	US Sud Forézienne (10)
281.	FC Saint-Martin-la-Sauveté (12)	0–7	Forez Donzy FC (9)
282.	AS Cours (13)	0–9	ES Dyonisienne (11)
283.	FC Belette de Saint-Léger (13)	3–1	AS Saint Haonnoise (11)
284.	US Briennon (11)	1–6	US Renaisonnaise Apchonnaise (10)
285.	FC Régny (13)	0–10	AS Saint-Symphorien-de-Lay (11)
286.	US Parigny Saint-Cyr (11)	4–0	FC Commelle-Vernay (9)
287.	FC Montagny (12)	0–3	AS Pouilly-les-Nonains (10)
288.	Nord Roannais (11)	3–1	ASL Portugais Roanne (10)
289.	Rhins Trambouze Foot (11)	2–2 (2–4 p)	US Villerest (10)
290.	Gand Olympique Avenir Loire Football (11)	1–1 (4–3 p)	Riorges FC (10)
291.	Olympique Est Roannais (11)	3–0	Rhins Sportif Saint Victor (13)
292.	Bellegarde Sports (13)	0–0 (4–5 p)	AS Chambéon-Magneux (9)
293.	AS Cuzieu (13)	1–2	Toranche FC (11)
294.	AS Finerbal Nervieux Balbigny (11)	0–3	US Ecotay-Moingt (10)
295.	Haut Pilat Interfoot (11)	0–3	L'Étrat-La Tour Sportif (8)
296.	AL Saint-Genest-Lerpt (12)	3–0	FC Montrambert Ricamar (10)
297.	AS Couzan (11)	0–2	AS Saint-Just-Saint-Rambert (10)
298.	FC Saint-Paul-en-Jarez (9)	3–0	SEL Saint-Priest-en-Jarez (8)
299.	ES Doizieux-La Terrasse-sur-Dorlay (11)	1–14	US L'Horme (10)
300.	FC Plaine Cleppé/Poncins (12)	3–2	Saint-Romain-les-Atheux Sports (12)
301.	ES Chomérac (10)	0–2	ASF Pierrelatte (8)
302.	AS Portugaise Valence (10)	0–3	SC Cruas (8)
303.	Allex-Chabrillan-Eurre FC (11)	1–5	Olympique Ruomsois (8)
304.	AS Cornas (10)	0–3	Olympique Centre Ardèche (9)
305.	US Ancône (11)	1–2	US Portes Hautes Cévennes (9)
306.	CS Châteauneuf-de-Galaure (12)	1–1 (3–5 p)	AAJ Saint-Alban-d'Ay (11)
307.	AS Berg-Helvie (10)	2–1	FC Montélimar (10)
308.	ES Trèfle (12)	2–6	FC Muzolais (10)
309.	AS La Sanne (11)	0–3	RC Mauves (10)
310.	FC Clérieux-Saint-Bardoux-Granges-les-Beaumont (12)	1–1 (1–3 p)	Entente Sarras Sports Saint-Vallier (10)
311.	Glun FC (13)	1–2	US Peyrins (12)
312.	RC Savasson (12)	2–0	US Meysse (13)
313.	US Beaufortoise (12)	1–3	US Rochemaure (11)
314.	US Baixoise (12)	1–4	RC Tournon-Tain (11)
315.	FC Sauzet (12)	1–4	AS Homenetmen Bourg-lès Valence (11)
316.	Inter Haute Herbasse (12)	3–0	ES Malissardoise (12)
317.	CS Lapeyrousien (12)	0–7	US Pont-La Roche (11)
318.	AS Génissieux (12)	1–3	US Davézieux-Vidalon (10)
319.	US Saint-Just-Saint-Marcel (11)	7–1	FR Allan (10)
320.	FC Plateau Ardèchois (11)	3–0	AS Saint-Barthélemy-de-Vals (12)
321.	US Vals-les-Bains (11)	0–4	US Vallée du Jabron (11)
322.	US Bas-Vivarais (11)	4–0	AS Coucouron (11)
323.	FC Saint-Didier-sous-Aubenas (12)	1–1 (4–5 p)	US Saint-Gervais-sur-Roubion (11)
324.	CS Malataverne (12)	1–12	AS Roussas-Granges-Gontardes (11)
325.	US Drôme Provence (12)	3–8	Diois FC (11)
326.	AS Cancoise (12)	2–1	FC Hauterive (11)
327.	FC Goubetois (12)	2–6	AS Vallée du Doux (11)
328.	JS Saint-Paul-lès-Romans (12)	2–0	US Saint Martin-de-Valamas (12)
329.	ÉS Saint-Jeure-d'Ay-Marsan (12)	0–2	Vallis Auréa Foot (11)
330.	CO Châteauneuf-du-Rhône (12)	2–3	JS Livron (12)
331.	AS Saint-Barthélemy-Grozon (12)	3–0	FC Hermitage (11)
332.	US 2 Vallons (12)	3–3 (4–5 p)	EA Montvendre (11)
333.	FC Rochegudien (12)	0–0 (3–4 p)	FC Aubenas (11)
334.	ES Beaumonteleger (11)	2–0	FC Rambertois (11)
335.	FC 540 (11)	1–1 (4–3 p)	Olympique Saint-Montanais (12)
336.	FC Baume Montségur (13)	1–0	FC La Coucourde (12)
337.	US Lussas (12)	6–1	FC Saint-Restitut (13)
338.	ES Le Laris-Montchenu (13)	1–6	AS Roiffieux (12)
339.	FC Rochepaule (13)	1–2	US Veyras (12)
340.	AS Beauvallon (13)	2–2 (3–4 p)	OS Vallée de l'Ouvèze (12)
341.	AS Saint-Marcelloise (12)	1–0	AS Saint-Priest 07 (12)
342.	FC Bren (12)	2–1	FC Turquoise (12)
343.	FC Montmiral-Parnans (12)	3–2	ES Boulieu-lès-Annonay (10)
344.	FC Vallon-Pont d'Arc (12)	3–6	FC Tricastin (10)
345.	AS Véore Montoison (10)	3–1	Valence FC (9)
346.	FC Larnage-Serves (11)	0–1	Football Mont-Pilat (9)
347.	ES Nord Drôme (11)	0–6	CO Châteauneuvois (9)
348.	CO Donzère (11)	1–0	US Mours (9)
349.	AS Dolon (11)	1–0	FC Portois (9)
350.	SC Piraillon (12)	3–1	FC Colombier Saint Barthélemy (12)
351.	Espérance Hostunoise (10)	3–2	Rhône Crussol Foot 07 (8)
352.	FC Félines-Saint-Cyr-Peaugres (11)	0–7	FC Eyrieux Embroye (8)
353.	IF Barbières-Bésayes-Rochefort-Samson-Marches (11)	2–1	US Chanas Sablons Serrières (9)
354.	FC Cheylarois (11)	1–4	FC Bourg-lès-Valence (9)
355.	US Montmeyran (10)	0–2	FC Péageois (9)
356.	US Montélier (11)	0–1	AS Donatienne (8)
357.	US Val d'Ay (10)	0–2	US Reventin (9)
358.	FC Châtelet (10)	3–3 (3–5 p)	PS Romanaise (9)
359.	AS Mont Jovet Bozel (11)	0–4	AS Ugine (9)
360.	US Grand Mont La Bâthie (10)	0–4	FC Haute Tarentaise (8)
361.	AS La Bridoire (12)	2–6	Montmélian AF (9)
362.	USC Aiguebelle (10)	0–1	Nivolet FC (8)
363.	FC des Bauges (12)	0–6	UO Albertville (9)
364.	FC Saint-Michel Sports (11)	1–1 (3–1 p)	US Grignon (9)
365.	US Modane (10)	0–2	CA Maurienne (8)
366.	US Saint-Rémy-de-Maurienne (11)	0–4	US La Ravoire (9)
367.	FC Laissaud (10)	4–0	Cognin Sports (8)
368.	AS Novalaise (10)	0–2	US Chartreuse Guiers (9)
369.	AS Haute Combe de Savoie (Note: AS Haute Combe de Savoie entered into a merger with US Grignon after the draw was made, so were ineligible to play.)	0–3	AS Cuines-La Chambre Val d'Arc (10)
370.	FC Villargondran (11)	0–5	FC Belle Étoile Mercury (9)
371.	Association Portugaise Croix Rouge Chambéry (10)	6–1	Saint-Pierre SF (10)
372.	US Domessin (11)	0–4	FC Chambotte (8)
373.	AS Brison-Saint-Innocent (11)	0–3	US Motteraine (9)
374.	ES Bourget du Lac (11)	1–3	ES Drumettaz-Mouxy (8)
375.	Challes SF (12)	5–2	FC Saint-Baldoph (11)
376.	FC La Rochette (11)	1–5	JS Chambéry (8)
377.	Cœur de Savoie (11)	1–3	US Pontoise (9)
378.	FC Sud Lac (11)	0–7	Entente Val d'Hyères (8)
379.	CA Yennne (11)	1–3	Chambéry Sport 73 (10)
380.	CS Veigy-Foncenex (11)	1–7	CS Amphion Publier (8)
381.	US Pers-Jussy (12)	0–7	AJ Ville-la-Grand (10)
382.	AS Le Lyaud-Armoy (11)	1–3	SS Allinges (9)
383.	FC Cranves-Sales (11)	0–0 (3–4 p)	FC Ballaison (9)
384.	FC Gavot (12)	0–2	AG Bons-en-Chablais (10)
385.	Arthaz Sports (13)	2–4	ES Douvaine-Loisin (11)
386.	FC Marcellaz-Albanais (11)	0–0 (3–2 p)	FC Chéran (9)
387.	CS Saint-Pierre (11)	2–4	US Pringy (8)
388.	FC Foron (8)	11–0	AS Lac Bleu (11)
389.	ES Lanfonnet (12)	2–0	CS La Balme-de-Sillingy (10)
390.	CS Megève (12)	0–2	CS Ayze (10)
391.	FC Villy-le-Pelloux (13)	2–2 (6–7 p)	FC Frangy (11)
392.	AS Cornier (12)	2–3	CSA Poisy (10)
393.	FC Semine (11)	1–1 (0–3 p)	CO Chavanod (10)
394.	ES Meythet (11)	2–2 (4–2 p)	Olympique Cran (10)
395.	AS Thonon (11)	0–3	JS Reignier (9)
396.	CS Vacheresse Vallée d'Abondance (12)	1–3	SC Morzine Vallée d'Aulps (10)
397.	FC Anthy Sport (12)	0–3	ES Fillinges (10)
398.	AS Épagny-Metz-Tessy (12)	0–1	FC La Filière (10)
399.	CSL Perrignier (12)	1–3	FC Vuache (10)
400.	Bonne AC (13)	0–3	ES Sciez (11)
401.	FC Aravis (13)	1–0	AS Parmelan Villaz (11)
402.	AS Évires (11)	1–4	FC Thônes (9)
403.	FC Dingy-Saint-Clair (11)	5–5 (4–3 p)	Beaumont Collonges FC (10)
404.	US Argonay (10)	2–2 (5–4 p)	US Semnoz-Vieugy (8)
405.	ES Thyez (10)	1–1 (5–6 p)	Haut Giffre FC (9)
406.	US Challex (12)	0–3	Échenevex-Ségny-Chevry Olympique (10)
407.	FC Leman Presqu'île (13)	2–0	FRS Champanges (11)
408.	US Margencel (11)	2–3	Marignier Sports (9)
409.	FC Combloux (10)	0–5	ES Amancy (8)
410.	FC Arenthon-Scientrier (12)	1–6	ASC Sallanches (10)
411.	ES Valleiry (10)	1–3	FC Cruseilles (8)
412.	US Vétraz-Monthoux (12)	0–3	US Divonne (8)
413.	Football Sud Gessien (11)	0–5	US Annemasse-Gaillard (8)
414.	ES Viry (11)	2–5	Pays de Gex FC (8)
415.	AS Prévessin-Moëns (11)	0–4	AS Sillingy (9)
416.	AS Portugais Annecy (12)	0–7	ES Cernex (10)
417.	ES Saint-Jeoire-La Tour (10)	0–0 (4–3 p)	US Mont Blanc (8)
418.	FC Les Houches-Servoz (13)	0–8	FC Cluses (11)

=== Second round ===
These matches were played on 4, 5 and 8 September 2021.

Second round results: Auvergne-Rhône-Alpes
Tie no	Home team (tier)	Score	Away team (tier)
1.	Olympique Saint-Étienne (11)	0–0 (4–3 p)	AS Savigneux-Montbrison (8)
2.	AS Louchy (8)	3–3 (3–2 p)	Commentry FC (9)
3.	FC La Sure (10)	1–2	FC Crolles-Bernin (9)
4.	AS Algérienne Chambon-Feugerolles (9)	0–0 (2–4 p)	ES Veauche (7)
5.	ES Montagne Bourbonnaise (11)	0–3	Bézenet-Doyet Foot (8)
6.	US Toque Huriel (11)	1–2	FC Souvigny (10)
7.	Carladez-Goul Sportif (9)	3–1	FC des Quatre Vallées (9)
8.	ES Riomois-Condat (9)	1–1 (4–1 p)	AS Espinat (9)
9.	US Chapdes-Beaufort (10)	0–3	AS Job (9)
10.	US Saint-Gervaisienne (10)	1–6	Clermont Outre-Mer (10)
11.	FC Nord Limagne (9)	3–1	FC Vertaizon (8)
12.	Espérance Ceyratois Football (8)	5–1	FC Lezoux (9)
13.	AS Saint-Ours (10)	0–1	US Saint-Beauzire (8)
14.	US Davézieux-Vidalon (10)	3–0	AS Homenetmen Bourg-lès Valence (11)
15.	Olympique Centre Ardèche (9)	1–0	Olympique Ruomsois (8)
16.	AG Bons-en-Chablais (10)	3–0	SS Allinges (9)
17.	SC Morzine Vallée d'Aulps (10)	1–3	Haut Giffre FC (9)
18.	ASC Sallanches (10)	3–3 (3–2 p)	ES Amancy (8)
19.	AC Creuzier-le-Vieux (8)	1–2	AS Nord Vignoble (8)
20.	Étoile Moulins Yzeure (9)	0–4	AS Cheminots Saint-Germain (7)
21.	US Trezelles (10)	1–2	AS Varennes-sur-Allier (8)
22.	AS Chassenard Luneau (11)	2–3	SC Gannat (9)
23.	Stade Saint-Yorre (9)	3–1	US Biachette Désertines (10)
24.	FC Creuzier-le-Neuf (12)	0–6	JS Neuvy (9)
25.	AS Saint-Loup (12)	2–3	AS Neuilly-le-Réal (11)
26.	US Abrest (11)	4–0	US Saulcet-Le Theil (11)
27.	US Coeur Allier (12)	1–4	US Vallon (10)
28.	CS Thielois (12)	3–3 (3–2 p)	Espoir Molinetois (11)
29.	FC Billy-Crechy (10)	1–3	Bourbon Sportif (9)
30.	AL Quinssaines (10)	1–3	US Bien-Assis (11)
31.	FC Haut d'Allier (10)	0–2	AA Lapalisse (7)
32.	Magnet/Seuillet/Saint-Gérand-le-Puy Foot (11)	0–1	AS Dompierroise (9)
33.	US Vendat (8)	4–3	SCA Cussét (7)
34.	US Chevagnes (11)	1–3	SC Saint-Pourcain (7)
35.	AC Franco-Algérienne (10)	1–7	FC Châtel-Guyon (7)
36.	FC Massiac-Molompize-Blesle (10)	4–1	Saint-Georges SL (11)
37.	FC Moussages (9)	3–4	ES Pierrefortaise (8)
38.	ES Saint-Mamet (9)	2–1	US Vallée de l'Authre (7)
39.	Aspre FC Fontanges (13)	1–2	AS Belbexoise (9)
40.	CS Vézac (9)	2–3	US Murat (8)
41.	US Crandelles (9)	1–2	Parlan-Le Rouget FC (8)
42.	US La Chapelle-Laurent (10)	0–9	Entente Nord Lozère (7)
43.	ES Vebret-Ydes (11)	1–0	AS Yolet (9)
44.	FC Junhac-Montsalvy (10)	0–2	Sud Cantal Foot (8)
45.	AS Sansacoise (8)	4–0	FC Ally Mauriac (7)
46.	FC Aurec (10)	1–2	US Vals Le Puy (9)
47.	Vigilante Saint-Pal-de-Mons (10)	2–4	Olympic Saint-Julien-Chapteuil (8)
48.	AS Villettoise (9)	1–2	AS Chadrac (8)
49.	US Montfaucon Montregard Raucoules (10)	3–4	FC Arzon (10)
50.	FJEP Freycenets Saint-Jeures (10)	1–4	US Bains-Saint-Christophe (9)
51.	AS Saint-Vidal (10)	1–3	AS Laussonne (9)
52.	AS Grazac-Lapte (9)	0–4	US Sucs et Lignon (7)
53.	FC Saint-Germain-Laprade (10)	2–2 (2–4 p)	AS Loudes (8)
54.	FC Dunières (8)	3–1	SC Langogne (7)
55.	AS Pertuis (11)	2–6	Retournac Sportif (7)
56.	US Fontannoise (8)	0–2	US Brioude (7)
57.	AS Cheminots Langeac (9)	4–4 (3–2 p)	Association Vergongheon-Arvant (7)
58.	Seauve Sports (8)	2–4	AS Emblavez-Vorey (7)
59.	AS Cunlhat (11)	0–1	ES Couze Pavin (11)
60.	US Limons (10)	1–2	Dômes-Sancy Foot (8)
61.	AS Roche-Blanche FC (11)	3–6	Ecureuils Franc Rosier (9)
62.	ACS Cappadoce (11)	1–1 (5–4 p)	AS Cellule (9)
63.	CS Pont-de-Dore (10)	2–3	US Issoire (7)
64.	US Messeix Bourg-Lastic (11)	2–2 (4–5 p)	US Gerzat (9)
65.	FC Bromont-Lamothe/Montfermy (11)	1–3	RC Charbonnières-Paugnat (10)
66.	CS Saint-Bonnet-près-Riom (10)	1–6	US Beaumontoise (7)
67.	FF Chappes (11)	1–1 (9–10 p)	SC Billom (9)
68.	Aulnat Sportif (12)	1–5	US Bassin Minier (9)
69.	FC Sauxillanges Saint-Babel Brenat (9)	1–2	FCUS Ambert (7)
70.	US Ménétrol (12)	2–1	FC Mirefleurs (10)
71.	Clermont Ouvoimoja (10)	2–2 (6–7 p)	FC Cournon-d'Auvergne (7)
72.	FC Martres-Lussat (9)	0–0 (5–3 p)	US Vic-le-Comte (8)
73.	US Beauregard-Vendon (12)	1–1 (3–2 p)	AS Enval-Marsat (8)
74.	US Les Martres-de-Veyre (8)	2–0	CS Pont-du-Château (7)
75.	UJ Clermontoise (8)	0–1	US Mozac (8)
76.	AS Hautecourt-Romanèche (11)	1–3	Olympique Sud Revermont 01 (10)
77.	Côtière Meximieux Villieu (12)	0–2	CS Lagnieu (8)
78.	FC Saint-Maurice-de-Gourdans (11)	2–6	FC Dombes (10)
79.	ES Val de Saône (10)	0–0 (3–5 p)	FC Veyle Sâone (8)
80.	Entente Bas Bugey Rhône (11)	3–5	Ambérieu FC (9)
81.	AS Portugaise Vaulx-en-Velin (10)	3–0 (Note: Tie reversed from original draw.)	FC Montluel (13)
82.	Entente Saint-Martin-du-Frêne/Maillat/Combe du Val (11)	1–1 (2–4 p)	US Arbent Marchon (8)
83.	FC Bressans (8)	2–1	FC Plaine Tonique (9)
84.	FC Curtafond-Confrançon-Saint-Martin-Saint-Didier (10)	1–2	CS Viriat (8)
85.	Bourg Sud (9)	0–3	CS Neuville (7)
86.	US Vaux-en-Bugey (12)	1–1 (3–1 p)	CS Belley (9)
87.	AS Genay (11)	3–1	AS Attignat (10)
88.	FC Saint-Vulbas Plaine de l'Ain (10)	1–10	Oyonnax Plastics Vallée FC (8)
89.	Olympique Buyatin (11)	0–10	Valserine FC (11)
90.	FC Manziat (10)	1–2	SC Portes de l'Ain (9)
91.	AS Travailleurs Turcs Oyonnax (11)	2–4	AS Montréal-la-Cluse (9)
92.	ÉS Liergues (9)	0–1	FC Dombes-Bresse (9)
93.	Belleville Football Beaujolais (8)	1–6	US Feillens (7)
94.	Caluire SC (8)	0–3	FC Bords de Saône (7)
95.	AS Saint-Étienne-sur-Chalaronne (12)	2–3	AS Diémoz (10)
96.	FC Rive Droite (10)	1–1 (4–3 p)	FC Reneins Vauxonne (11)
97.	Beaujolais Football (10)	3–1	FC Denicé Arnas (11)
98.	AS Grièges Pont de Veyle (12)	1–3	US Formans (12)
99.	ASA Clochemerle (11)	2–9	ES Bressane Marboz (7)
100.	AS Bron Grand Lyon (8)	4–0	FC Pays de l'Arbresle (9)
101.	FC Colombier-Satolas (9)	3–0	US Meyzieu (8)
102.	FC Chaponnay-Marennes (8)	8–2	UGA Lyon-Décines (9)
103.	JS Cellieu (10)	4–1	Ménival FC (9)
104.	AS Toussieu (11)	1–3	CS Meginand (9)
105.	Feyzin Club Belle Étoile (8)	0–5	AS Villeurbanne Éveil Lyonnais (9)
106.	ASC Générale Routière Maïa Sonnier (11)	0–8	AS Bellecour-Perrache (8)
107.	ES Genas Azieu (9)	2–3	FC Saint-Cyr Collonges au Mont d'Or (8)
108.	ES Saint-Priest (10)	2–6	AS Montchat Lyon (7)
109.	ES Gleizé (11)	1–6	US Millery-Vourles (8)
110.	ACS Mayotte du Rhône (11)	0–4	AS Saint-Martin-en-Haut (9)
111.	FC La Giraudière (11)	1–5	CO Saint-Fons (9)
112.	US Montanay (11)	0–2	FC Sourcieux-les-Mines (11)
113.	FC Sévenne (9)	3–1	JSO Givors (10)
114.	FC Fontaines-sur-Saône (10)	1–4	Sporting Nord-Isère (8)
115.	FC Antillais Villeurbanne (13)	1–2	Association Chandieu-Heyrieux (9)
116.	Latino AFC Lyon (12)	0–1	Sud Lyonnais Foot (7)
117.	US Loire-Saint-Romain (10)	1–0	Domtac FC (7)
118.	US Villette-d'Anthon-Janneyrais (13)	8–3	SC Revolée (13)
119.	Saint-Alban Sportif (10)	2–6	ÉS Trinité Lyon (7)
120.	AS Sornins Réunis (12)	0–8	AS Saint-Forgeux (10)
121.	Lyon Croix Rousse Football (11)	0–1	Olympique Saint-Genis-Laval (7)
122.	FC Croix Roussien (10)	3–1	CS Ozon (11)
123.	Chambost-Allières-Saint-Just-d'Avray (12)	0–9	Stade Amplepuisien (8)
124.	CAS Cheminots Oullins Lyon (10)	6–0	US Côteaux Lyonnais (11)
125.	FC Mont Brouilly (9)	2–1	SO Pont-de-Chéruy-Chavanoz (8)
126.	AL Saint-Maurice-l'Exil (9)	2–1	Olympique Nord Dauphiné (8)
127.	Beaucroissant FC (11)	1–3	Moirans FC (12)
128.	AS Fontaine (12)	6–0	Vourey Sports (13)
129.	US Abbaye (13)	5–2	UO Portugal Saint-Martin-d'Hères (10)
130.	FC Virieu-Valondras (11)	1–10	FC Vallée de la Gresse (8)
131.	CS Voreppe (10)	1–6	ES Manival (7)
132.	Rives SF (10)	4–1	AS Grésivaudan (11)
133.	Isle d'Abeau FC (10)	0–2	ASF Portugais (11)
134.	Olympique Les Avenières (10)	3–3 (5–6 p)	FC Charvieu-Chavagneux (8)
135.	JS Saint-Georgeoise (11)	13–0	US Cassolards Passageois (12)
136.	US Village Olympique Grenoble (11)	1–5	Noyarey FC (10)
137.	US Corbelin (10)	1–4	FC Varèze (8)
138.	AS Vézeronce-Huert (9)	1–5	MOS Trois Rivières (7)
139.	US Jarrie-Champ (9)	1–1 (3–2 p)	Football Côte Saint-André (7)
140.	AS Tullins-Fures (10)	0–5	US Ruy Montceau (10)
141.	AS Crossey (12)	1–5	Artas Charantonnay FC (10)
142.	Union Nord Iséroise (10)	0–5	AS Domarin (8)
143.	FC Balmes Nord-Isère (9)	2–10	Vallée du Guiers FC (8)
144.	US Chatte (12)	0–4	AS Italienne Européenne Grenoble (9)
145.	FC Vallée de l'Hien (11)	0–0 (4–3 p)	OC Eybens (8)
146.	AS Saint-Lattier (11)	0–5	ES Rachais (8)
147.	MJC Saint-Hilaire-de-la-Côte (11)	0–3	Olympique Saint-Marcellin (7)
148.	Eclose Châteauvilain Badinières Football (11)	1–5	FC La Tour-Saint-Clair (7)
149.	FC Chirens (12)	0–6	US Gières (7)
150.	US Peyrins (12)	1–3	RC Savasson (12)
151.	US Rochemaure (11)	5–0	RC Tournon-Tain (11)
152.	US Pont-La Roche (11)	5–0	Inter Haute Herbasse (12)
153.	US Vallée du Jabron (11)	0–1	US Bas-Vivarais (11)
154.	ES Beaumonteleger (11)	2–2 (4–3 p)	FC Valdaine (7)
155.	AS Donatienne (8)	2–2 (5–6 p)	US Reventin (9)
156.	IF Barbières-Bésayes-Rochefort-Samson-Marches (11)	3–5	Football Mont-Pilat (9)
157.	US Veyras (12)	2–8	FC Péageois (9)
158.	OS Vallée de l'Ouvèze (12)	0–8	CO Châteauneuvois (9)
159.	US Lussas (12)	6–1	FC 540 (11)
160.	FC Bren (12)	6–0	FC Montmiral-Parnans (12)
161.	CO Donzère (11)	0–1	FC Eyrieux Embroye (8)
162.	FC Tricastin (10)	1–3	FC Aubenas (11)
163.	FC Annonay (8)	1–0	US Monistrol (8)
164.	SC Piraillon (12)	1–11	AS Chavanay (7)
165.	US Saint-Just-Saint-Marcel (11)	2–2 (2–3 p)	FC Chabeuil (7)
166.	SC Cruas (8)	0–6	AS Sud Ardèche (7)
167.	AS Berg-Helvie (10)	2–4	Entente Crest-Aouste (7)
168.	US Saint-Gervais-sur-Roubion (11)	4–2	AS Roussas-Granges-Gontardes (11)
169.	JS Livron (12)	4–3	PS Romanaise (9)
170.	Diois FC (11)	4–3	FC Plateau Ardèchois (11)
171.	AS Vallée du Doux (11)	2–0	AS Cancoise (12)
172.	Vallis Auréa Foot (11)	4–0	JS Saint-Paul-lès-Romans (12)
173.	ASF Pierrelatte (8)	5–3	US Portes Hautes Cévennes (9)
174.	FC Bourg-lès-Valence (9)	1–4	UMS Montélimar (7)
175.	AAJ Saint-Alban-d'Ay (11)	0–2	FC Muzolais (10)
176.	RC Mauves (10)	3–2	Entente Sarras Sports Saint-Vallier (10)
177.	FC Baume Montségur (13)	0–8	AS Véore Montoison (10)
178.	AS Roiffieux (12)	8–0	AS Saint-Marcelloise (12)
179.	AS Dolon (11)	0–2	Espérance Hostunoise (10)
180.	CS Crémeaux (10)	4–0	AS Moissat (10)
181.	FC Belette de Saint-Léger (13)	0–0 (4–2 p)	ES Dyonisienne (11)
182.	US Renaisonnaise Apchonnaise (10)	2–3	FC Loire Sornin (10)
183.	AS Saint-Symphorien-de-Lay (11)	0–2	Roannais Foot 42 (7)
184.	AS Pouilly-les-Nonains (10)	1–2	US Parigny Saint-Cyr (11)
185.	US Villerest (10)	3–1	Nord Roannais (11)
186.	Olympique Est Roannais (11)	1–1 (3–1 p)	Gand Olympique Avenir Loire Football (11)
187.	Toranche FC (11)	0–2	AS Chambéon-Magneux (9)
188.	FC Bourguisan (10)	3–4	FC Saint-Étienne (8)
189.	FCI Saint-Romain-le-Puy (10)	3–2	USG La Fouillouse (8)
190.	US Filerin (11)	2–1	Anzieux Foot (8)
191.	FC Bonson-Saint-Cyprien (12)	0–12	L'Étrat-La Tour Sportif (8)
192.	US Ecotay-Moingt (10)	1–10	US Saint-Galmier-Chambœuf (8)
193.	Montreynaud 42 (13)	0–4	Sorbiers-La Talaudière (8)
194.	ABH FC (12)	3–2	Olympique Le Coteau (10)
195.	Feu Vert Saint-Chamond (11)	5–0	US L'Horme (10)
196.	Sury SC (10)	2–3	AS Saint-Just-Saint-Rambert (10)
197.	US Métare Saint-Étienne Sud Est (11)	3–0	ES Haut Forez (12)
198.	GS Dervaux Chambon-Feugerolles (9)	1–3	Saint-Chamond Foot (7)
199.	CO La Rivière (11)	0–3	Côte Chaude Sportif (7)
200.	FC Plaine Cleppé/Poncins (12)	1–5	AF Pays de Coise (9)
201.	ES Champdieu-Marcilly (10)	2–4	Forez Donzy FC (9)
202.	SS Ussonaise (11)	1–0	AL Saint-Genest-Lerpt (12)
203.	FC Saint-Paul-en-Jarez (9)	1–4	FC Roche-Saint-Genest (7)
204.	AS Ugine (9)	4–2	FC Haute Tarentaise (8)
205.	FC Saint-Michel Sports (11)	3–1	CA Maurienne (8)
206.	UO Albertville (9)	0–2	ES Tarentaise (7)
207.	Montmélian AF (9)	0–2	Nivolet FC (8)
208.	AS Cuines-La Chambre Val d'Arc (10)	0–4	FC Belle Étoile Mercury (9)
209.	Challes SF (12)	0–4	US La Ravoire (9)
210.	US Chartreuse Guiers (9)	1–5	JS Chambéry (8)
211.	US Motteraine (9)	0–0 (4–5 p)	ES Drumettaz-Mouxy (8)
212.	Association Portugaise Croix Rouge Chambéry (10)	1–3	FC Chambotte (8)
213.	US Pontoise (9)	0–3	FC Laissaud (10)
214.	Chambéry Sport 73 (10)	0–4	Entente Val d'Hyères (8)
215.	ES Douvaine-Loisin (11)	0–0 (2–4 p)	CS Amphion Publier (8)
216.	CS Ayze (10)	0–6	AJ Ville-la-Grand (10)
217.	FC Ballaison (9)	1–2	JS Reignier (9)
218.	FC Marcellaz-Albanais (11)	0–2	US Annecy-le-Vieux (7)
219.	CSA Poisy (10)	1–4	US Pringy (8)
220.	ES Lanfonnet (12)	0–6	FC Foron (8)
221.	FC Frangy (11)	4–3	ES Chilly (7)
222.	CO Chavanod (10)	6–3	ES Meythet (11)
223.	ES Fillinges (10)	6–2	FC Vuache (10)
224.	ES Sciez (11)	1–2	FC La Filière (10)
225.	FC Aravis (13)	2–2 (4–2 p)	FC Thônes (9)
226.	FC Dingy-Saint-Clair (11)	0–2	US Argonay (10)
227.	Échenevex-Ségny-Chevry Olympique (10)	3–0	ES Seynod (9)
228.	FC Leman Presqu'île (13)	0–3	Marignier Sports (9)
229.	ES Cernex (10)	2–1	FC Cruseilles (8)
230.	US Divonne (8)	3–5	US Annemasse-Gaillard (8)
231.	AS Sillingy (9)	3–2	Pays de Gex FC (8)
232.	FC Cluses (11)	2–3	ES Saint-Jeoire-La Tour (10)
233.	US Saint-Geoire-en-Valdaine (12)	0–8	FC Seyssins (8)
234.	FC Sayat Argnat (11)	0–2	EFC Saint-Amant-Tallende (8)
235.	Saint-Amant et Tallende SC (12)	0–3	AS Saint-Genès-Champanelle (8)
236.	EA Montvendre (11)	2–6	FC Hermitage (11)
237.	ES Revermontoise (10)	2–2 (5–3 p)	FC Côtière-Luenaz (10)
238.	FC Gerland Lyon (10)	1–0	Olympique Vaulx-en-Venlin (10)

=== Third round ===
These matches were played on 17, 18 and 19 September 2021.

Third round results: Auvergne-Rhône-Alpes
Tie no	Home team (tier)	Score	Away team (tier)
1.	Ecureuils Franc Rosier (9)	1–6	AS Moulins (5)
2.	SC Gannat (9)	1–4	SA Thiers (6)
3.	RC Charbonnières-Paugnat (10)	3–1	US Abrest (11)
4.	US Saint-Beauzire (8)	0–1	Lempdes Sport (6)
5.	AS Saint-Genès-Champanelle (8)	1–1 (3–4 p)	Espérance Ceyratois Football (8)
6.	US Ménétrol (12)	0–1	Clermont Outre-Mer (10)
7.	Dômes-Sancy Foot (8)	1–2	FC Cournon-d'Auvergne (7)
8.	ACS Cappadoce (11)	0–9	US Beaumontoise (7)
9.	US Beauregard-Vendon (12)	1–6	FCUS Ambert (7)
10.	Bézenet-Doyet Foot (8)	1–1 (6–7 p)	FA Le Cendre (6)
11.	AS Job (9)	1–1 (6–5 p) (Note: Tie reversed from original draw.)	Stade Saint-Yorre (9)
12.	FC Châtel-Guyon (7)	0–1	FC Riom (6)
13.	AS Louchy (8)	3–3 (3–4 p)	RC Vichy (6)
14.	US Vallon (10)	1–3	AS Nord Vignoble (8)
15.	Bourbon Sportif (9)	1–5	AA Lapalisse (7)
16.	CS Thielois (12)	1–8	US Les Martres-de-Veyre (8)
17.	US Vendat (8)	1–3	AS Domerat (6)
18.	AS Neuilly-le-Réal (11)	1–3	FC Souvigny (10)
19.	AS Dompierroise (9)	0–2	CS Volvic (6)
20.	SC Saint-Pourcain (7)	0–3	Montluçon Football (5)
21.	FC Nord Limagne (9)	2–0	Cébazat Sports (6)
22.	JS Neuvy (9)	1–1 (5–4 p)	AS Cheminots Saint-Germain (7)
23.	US Bien-Assis (11)	2–3	US Mozac (8)
24.	US Gerzat (9)	2–2 (4–1 p)	AS Varennes-sur-Allier (8)
25.	SC Billom (9)	3–1	Sud Cantal Foot (8)
26.	US Brioude (7)	2–1	Ytrac Foot (6)
27.	ES Vebret-Ydes (11)	1–2	ES Pierrefortaise (8)
28.	ES Riomois-Condat (9)	2–3	US Issoire (7)
29.	AS Belbexoise (9)	1–1 (2–4 p)	Sporting Chataigneraie Cantal (6)
30.	AS Cheminots Langeac (9)	4–4 (3–5 p)	ES Saint-Mamet (9)
31.	FC Massiac-Molompize-Blesle (10)	2–6	AS Sansacoise (8)
32.	Carladez-Goul Sportif (9)	2–6	Entente Nord Lozère (7)
33.	ES Couze Pavin (11)	1–1 (6–5 p)	US Bassin Minier (9)
34.	Parlan-Le Rouget FC (8)	0–3	US Saint-Flour (6)
35.	US Murat (8)	1–3	Aurillac FC (5)
36.	Feu Vert Saint-Chamond (11)	1–2	AS Chadrac (8)
37.	FC Dunières (8)	1–3	AS Saint-Jacques (6)
38.	SS Ussonaise (11)	1–0	US Bains-Saint-Christophe (9)
39.	AF Pays de Coise (9)	2–0	FC Martres-Lussat (9)
40.	EFC Saint-Amant-Tallende (8)	0–1	AS Emblavez-Vorey (7)
41.	FC Arzon (10)	1–6	US Blavozy (6)
42.	Football Mont-Pilat (9)	4–0	Retournac Sportif (7)
43.	US Vals Le Puy (9)	0–3	FC Espaly (6)
44.	AS Loudes (8)	1–1 (5–4 p)	Olympic Saint-Julien-Chapteuil (8)
45.	AS Laussonne (9)	0–5	Velay FC (5)
46.	JS Cellieu (10)	1–1 (4–3 p)	US Sucs et Lignon (7)
47.	RC Savasson (12)	1–3	ASF Pierrelatte (8)
48.	FC Eyrieux Embroye (8)	0–3	Entente Crest-Aouste (7)
49.	US Pont-La Roche (11)	6–1	JS Livron (12)
50.	FC Annonay (8)	3–1	Olympique Centre Ardèche (9)
51.	AS Roiffieux (12)	0–3	US Reventin (9)
52.	US Saint-Gervais-sur-Roubion (11)	2–1	FC Péageois (9)
53.	Diois FC (11)	1–4	AS Chavanay (7)
54.	Espérance Hostunoise (10)	1–2	FC Vaulx-en-Velin (5)
55.	RC Mauves (10)	3–4	US Davézieux-Vidalon (10)
56.	US Bas-Vivarais (11)	0–0 (4–3 p)	Olympique de Valence (6)
57.	UMS Montélimar (7)	0–1	FC Rhône Vallées (6)
58.	AS Vallée du Doux (11)	2–7	FC Chabeuil (7)
59.	FC Bren (12)	2–2 (3–2 p)	FC Muzolais (10)
60.	FC Hermitage (11)	2–2 (2–4 p)	ES Beaumonteleger (11)
61.	Vallis Auréa Foot (11)	2–3	CO Châteauneuvois (9)
62.	FC Aubenas (11)	1–2	AL Saint-Maurice-l'Exil (9)
63.	AS Véore Montoison (10)	3–2	US Rochemaure (11)
64.	US Lussas (12)	0–8	AS Sud Ardèche (7)
65.	ABH FC (12)	0–6	Hauts Lyonnais (5)
66.	FC Loire Sornin (10)	4–2	FC Saint-Étienne (8)
67.	FCI Saint-Romain-le-Puy (10)	3–0	Olympique Saint-Étienne (11)
68.	US Métare Saint-Étienne Sud Est (11)	0–3	L'Étrat-La Tour Sportif (8)
69.	US Filerin (11)	0–8	US Feurs (6)
70.	CAS Cheminots Oullins Lyon (10)	0–1	Côte Chaude Sportif (7)
71.	US Villerest (10)	1–1 (4–5 p)	Sorbiers-La Talaudière (8)
72.	AS Chambéon-Magneux (9)	2–1	CO Saint-Fons (9)
73.	AS Saint-Just-Saint-Rambert (10)	2–0	FCO Firminy-Insersport (6)
74.	AS Saint-Forgeux (10)	0–2	Stade Amplepuisien (8)
75.	CS Crémeaux (10)	1–1 (7–8 p)	ES Veauche (7)
76.	Olympique Est Roannais (11)	2–2 (4–3 p)	CS Meginand (9)
77.	Saint-Chamond Foot (7)	5–1	US Saint-Galmier-Chambœuf (8)
78.	FC Belette de Saint-Léger (13)	2–2 (3–2 p)	FC Sourcieux-les-Mines (11)
79.	US Parigny Saint-Cyr (11)	4–5	US Loire-Saint-Romain (10)
80.	Roannais Foot 42 (7)	0–3	FC Roche-Saint-Genest (7)
81.	AS Saint-Martin-en-Haut (9)	1–3	Forez Donzy FC (9)
82.	US Formans (12)	2–3	Ambérieu FC (9)
83.	Olympique Saint-Genis-Laval (7)	1–2	AS Bron Grand Lyon (8)
84.	FC Gerland Lyon (10)	1–0	AS Bellecour-Perrache (8)
85.	FC Varèze (8)	2–0	FC Sévenne (9)
86.	US Villette-d'Anthon-Janneyrais (13)	0–14	FC Limonest Saint-Didier (5)
87.	AS Genay (11)	0–7	AS Misérieux-Trévoux (6)
88.	ASF Portugais (11)	1–0	Beaujolais Football (10)
89.	AS Montchat Lyon (7)	3–0	Sud Lyonnais Foot (7)
90.	FC Rive Droite (10)	2–2 (2–3 p)	FC Chaponnay-Marennes (8)
91.	Association Chandieu-Heyrieux (9)	1–3	CS Neuville (7)
92.	US Millery-Vourles (8)	0–2	FC Saint-Cyr Collonges au Mont d'Or (8)
93.	US Vaux-en-Bugey (12)	1–5	FC Veyle Sâone (8)
94.	Valserine FC (11)	3–0	ES Revermontoise (10)
95.	Échenevex-Ségny-Chevry Olympique (10)	0–0 (5–4 p)	FC Mont Brouilly (9)
96.	FC Dombes (10)	1–4	US Feillens (7)
97.	FC Dombes-Bresse (9)	– (Note: Match abandoned. Both sides penalised. No further information available.)	AS Portugaise Vaulx-en-Velin (10)
98.	Olympique Saint-Marcellin (7)	1–1 (5–4 p)	CS Viriat (8)
99.	FC Colombier-Satolas (9)	1–0	ÉS Trinité Lyon (7)
100.	FC Bressans (8)	0–2	Vénissieux FC (6)
101.	CS Lagnieu (8)	1–2	Ain Sud Foot (5)
102.	FC Bords de Saône (7)	1–0	FC Lyon (6)
103.	AS Villeurbanne Éveil Lyonnais (9)	1–0	FC Croix Roussien (10)
104.	FC Charvieu-Chavagneux (8)	2–0	SC Portes de l'Ain (9)
105.	FC Échirolles (6)	1–1 (6–5 p)	AC Seyssinet (6)
106.	FC Vallée de l'Hien (11)	2–5	FC Vallée de la Gresse (8)
107.	JS Chambéry (8)	5–0	AS Ugine (9)
108.	Sporting Nord-Isère (8)	4–1	AS Italienne Européenne Grenoble (9)
109.	ES Manival (7)	2–5	Chassieu Décines FC (6)
110.	CO Chavanod (10)	2–3	Rives SF (10)
111.	ES Rachais (8)	0–0 (5–4 p)	Olympique Salaise Rhodia (6)
112.	Noyarey FC (10)	2–1	FC Seyssins (8)
113.	FC La Tour-Saint-Clair (7)	2–0	AS Domarin (8)
114.	Nivolet FC (8)	2–0	US Jarrie-Champ (9)
115.	Artas Charantonnay FC (10)	1–2	Vallée du Guiers FC (8)
116.	AS Fontaine (12)	0–10	FC Bourgoin-Jallieu (5)
117.	US Abbaye (13)	0–3	FC Belle Étoile Mercury (9)
118.	US Ruy Montceau (10)	3–1	JS Saint-Georgeoise (11)
119.	FC Laissaud (10)	9–1	AS Diémoz (10)
120.	Moirans FC (12)	2–4	FC Crolles-Bernin (9)
121.	MOS Trois Rivières (7)	4–0	US Arbent Marchon (8)
122.	US La Ravoire (9)	0–1	US Gières (7)
123.	Olympique Sud Revermont 01 (10)	1–8	Entente Val d'Hyères (8)
124.	JS Reignier (9)	1–2	ES Bressane Marboz (7)
125.	Haut Giffre FC (9)	2–2 (5–4 p)	Marignier Sports (9)
126.	FC Aravis (13)	1–4	ES Cernex (10)
127.	AJ Ville-la-Grand (10)	3–2	US Pringy (8)
128.	AG Bons-en-Chablais (10)	2–3	FC Foron (8)
129.	ES Saint-Jeoire-La Tour (10)	2–0	FC Frangy (11)
130.	AS Sillingy (9)	4–1	ASC Sallanches (10)
131.	US Argonay (10)	1–5	US Annecy-le-Vieux (7)
132.	ES Fillinges (10)	0–5	ES Tarentaise (7)
133.	Oyonnax Plastics Vallée FC (8)	4–2	FC Chambotte (8)
134.	US Annemasse-Gaillard (8)	5–3	AS Montréal-la-Cluse (9)
135.	Chambéry SF (5)	3–1	Aix-les-Bains FC (6)
136.	Thonon Évian FC (5)	2–1	Cluses-Scionzier FC (6)
137.	ES Drumettaz-Mouxy (8)	1–1 (5–4 p)	CS Amphion Publier (8)
138.	FC La Filière (10)	3–0	FC Saint-Michel Sports (11)

=== Fourth round ===
These matches were played on 2 and 3 October 2021.

Fourth round results: Auvergne-Rhône-Alpes
Tie no	Home team (tier)	Score	Away team (tier)
1.	RC Charbonnières-Paugnat (10)	2–2 (2–3 p)	AS Sansacoise (8)
2.	US Issoire (7)	0–2	FC Chamalières (4)
3.	ES Pierrefortaise (8)	2–3	Entente Nord Lozère (7)
4.	US Gerzat (9)	1–2	Sporting Chataigneraie Cantal (6)
5.	ES Couze Pavin (11)	1–4	ES Saint-Mamet (9)
6.	Clermont Outre-Mer (10)	0–7	AS Saint-Jacques (6)
7.	US Beaumontoise (7)	3–2	Aurillac FC (5)
8.	Espérance Ceyratois Football (8)	0–3	US Saint-Flour (6)
9.	FA Le Cendre (6)	4–0	US Brioude (7)
10.	US Davézieux-Vidalon (10)	0–4	Côte Chaude Sportif (7)
11.	Football Mont-Pilat (9)	2–0	FC Annonay (8)
12.	SA Thiers (6)	3–1	AS Emblavez-Vorey (7)
13.	AS Chadrac (8)	5–0	AS Loudes (8)
14.	AF Pays de Coise (9)	0–2	Velay FC (5)
15.	FC Espaly (6)	0–0 (2–4 p)	AS Chavanay (7)
16.	JS Cellieu (10)	0–4	US Blavozy (6)
17.	SS Ussonaise (11)	0–2	Le Puy Foot 43 Auvergne (4)
18.	Lempdes Sport (6)	2–2 (3–4 p)	FC Roche-Saint-Genest (7)
19.	AS Job (9)	1–3	Moulins Yzeure Foot (4)
20.	SC Billom (9)	0–4	RC Vichy (6)
21.	US Mozac (8)	2–2 (4–2 p)	FC Nord Limagne (9)
22.	AS Nord Vignoble (8)	0–2	FC Riom (6)
23.	JS Neuvy (9)	1–5	Montluçon Football (5)
24.	US Les Martres-de-Veyre (8)	7–1	FCUS Ambert (7)
25.	CS Volvic (6)	0–0 (4–5 p)	FC Cournon-d'Auvergne (7)
26.	AS Domerat (6)	2–3	AA Lapalisse (7)
27.	FC Souvigny (10)	0–4	AS Moulins (5)
28.	L'Étrat-La Tour Sportif (8)	2–0	AS Sud Ardèche (7)
29.	FC Bren (12)	1–1 (2–4 p)	FC Chaponnay-Marennes (8)
30.	US Pont-La Roche (11)	1–1 (2–3 p)	AL Saint-Maurice-l'Exil (9)
31.	US Reventin (9)	1–3	FCI Saint-Romain-le-Puy (10)
32.	FC Belette de Saint-Léger (13)	0–3	AS Chambéon-Magneux (9)
33.	AS Saint-Just-Saint-Rambert (10)	1–5	US Feurs (6)
34.	Sorbiers-La Talaudière (8)	0–2	Andrézieux-Bouthéon FC (4)
35.	US Saint-Gervais-sur-Roubion (11)	0–4	FC Limonest Saint-Didier (5)
36.	ASF Pierrelatte (8)	2–3	Forez Donzy FC (9)
37.	ES Veauche (7)	0–2	Entente Crest-Aouste (7)
38.	FC Varèze (8)	1–0	Chassieu Décines FC (6)
39.	FC Loire Sornin (10)	0–5	AS Montchat Lyon (7)
40.	ES Beaumonteleger (11)	0–0 (4–5 p)	AS Véore Montoison (10)
41.	CO Châteauneuvois (9)	0–5	Lyon La Duchère (4)
42.	FC Chabeuil (7)	1–4	Saint-Chamond Foot (7)
43.	CS Neuville (7)	5–1	Sporting Nord-Isère (8)
44.	MOS Trois Rivières (7)	1–4	Ain Sud Foot (5)
45.	Olympique Est Roannais (11)	1–12	FC Bourgoin-Jallieu (5)
46.	US Bas-Vivarais (11)	0–3	Vénissieux FC (6)
47.	US Loire-Saint-Romain (10)	0–3	FC Rhône Vallées (6)
48.	US Feillens (7)	2–2 (6–7 p)	Stade Amplepuisien (8)
49.	AS Villeurbanne Éveil Lyonnais (9)	3–1	FC Gerland Lyon (10)
50.	FC Bords de Saône (7)	0–2	Hauts Lyonnais (5)
51.	FC Colombier-Satolas (9)	0–2	FC Vaulx-en-Velin (5)
52.	US Gières (7)	2–1	AS Bron Grand Lyon (8)
53.	FC Saint-Cyr Collonges au Mont d'Or (8)	1–1 (4–2 p)	FC Charvieu-Chavagneux (8)
54.	winner match 97	– (Note: AS Misérieux-Trévoux awarded a bye due to the outcome of the previous round.)	AS Misérieux-Trévoux (6)
55.	FC Veyle Sâone (8)	0–3	GOAL FC (4)
56.	FC Échirolles (6)	1–1 (4–5 p)	AS Saint-Priest (4)
57.	FC Vallée de la Gresse (8)	0–1	FC La Tour-Saint-Clair (7)
58.	Noyarey FC (10)	1–1 (5–3 p)	ASF Portugais (11)
59.	Ambérieu FC (9)	2–3	US Ruy Montceau (10)
60.	ES Bressane Marboz (7)	2–1	Nivolet FC (8)
61.	Entente Val d'Hyères (8)	2–1	Olympique Saint-Marcellin (7)
62.	Rives SF (10)	1–2	FC Crolles-Bernin (9)
63.	FC Laissaud (10)	1–1 (4–5 p)	ES Rachais (8)
64.	JS Chambéry (8)	1–2	Chambéry SF (5)
65.	Échenevex-Ségny-Chevry Olympique (10)	2–2 (5–4 p)	AJ Ville-la-Grand (10)
66.	FC La Filière (10)	1–3	Haut Giffre FC (9)
67.	US Annecy-le-Vieux (7)	0–0 (2–3 p)	Vallée du Guiers FC (8)
68.	FC Belle Étoile Mercury (9)	2–1	Oyonnax Plastics Vallée FC (8)
69.	ES Tarentaise (7)	3–1	ES Drumettaz-Mouxy (8)
70.	FC Foron (8)	1–1 (4–5 p)	AS Sillingy (9)
71.	Thonon Évian FC (5)	1–3	GFA Rumilly-Vallières (4)
72.	Valserine FC (11)	1–1 (4–5 p)	US Annemasse-Gaillard (8)
73.	ES Cernex (10)	4–3	ES Saint-Jeoire-La Tour (10)

=== Fifth round ===
These matches were played on 16 and 17 October 2021.

Fifth round results: Auvergne-Rhône-Alpes
Tie no	Home team (tier)	Score	Away team (tier)
1.	Entente Nord Lozère (7)	1–1 (3–4 p)	FA Le Cendre (6)
2.	FC Cournon-d'Auvergne (7)	2–3	Moulins Yzeure Foot (4)
3.	Sporting Chataigneraie Cantal (6)	1–1 (0–3 p)	RC Vichy (6)
4.	AA Lapalisse (7)	2–3	US Beaumontoise (7)
5.	AS Sansacoise (8)	1–2	US Saint-Flour (6)
6.	AS Saint-Jacques (6)	0–3	FC Chamalières (4)
7.	ES Saint-Mamet (9)	1–1 (4–2 p)	US Les Martres-de-Veyre (8)
8.	US Mozac (8)	2–4	Montluçon Football (5)
9.	AS Moulins (5)	3–1	Velay FC (5)
10.	FC Riom (6)	0–2	Le Puy Foot 43 Auvergne (4)
11.	Entente Crest-Aouste (7)	0–0 (13–12 p)	GOAL FC (4)
12.	AS Chavanay (7)	0–5	FC Limonest Saint-Didier (5)
13.	AL Saint-Maurice-l'Exil (9)	0–7	FC Villefranche (3)
14.	Forez Donzy FC (9)	1–1 (3–1 p)	Football Mont-Pilat (9)
15.	AS Chadrac (8)	1–2	US Blavozy (6)
16.	L'Étrat-La Tour Sportif (8)	0–2	Andrézieux-Bouthéon FC (4)
17.	AS Véore Montoison (10)	0–6	Hauts Lyonnais (5)
18.	Côte Chaude Sportif (7)	0–0 (5–4 p)	FC Rhône Vallées (6)
19.	FCI Saint-Romain-le-Puy (10)	0–4	Stade Amplepuisien (8)
20.	Saint-Chamond Foot (7)	0–0 (5–4 p)	ES Rachais (8)
21.	FC Crolles-Bernin (9)	0–1	AS Villeurbanne Éveil Lyonnais (9)
22.	US Ruy Montceau (10)	1–10	FC Bourgoin-Jallieu (5)
23.	FC Chaponnay-Marennes (8)	0–2	FC Saint-Cyr Collonges au Mont d'Or (8)
24.	FC Roche-Saint-Genest (7)	2–1	US Feurs (6)
25.	SA Thiers (6)	1–3	Lyon La Duchère (4)
26.	AS Saint-Priest (4)	2–3	Football Bourg-en-Bresse Péronnas 01 (3)
27.	AS Chambéon-Magneux (9)	0–6	AS Montchat Lyon (7)
28.	CS Neuville (7)	2–2 (7–6 p)	FC Varèze (8)
29.	Noyarey FC (10)	0–5	FC Vaulx-en-Velin (5)
30.	ES Tarentaise (7)	1–0	US Gières (7)
31.	FC Belle Étoile Mercury (9)	1–1 (2–4 p)	AS Misérieux-Trévoux (6)
32.	GFA Rumilly-Vallières (4)	3–2	FC Annecy (3)
33.	ES Cernex (10)	0–3	Chambéry SF (5)
34.	Échenevex-Ségny-Chevry Olympique (10)	2–4	FC La Tour-Saint-Clair (7)
35.	US Annemasse-Gaillard (8)	2–6	Vénissieux FC (6)
36.	Haut Giffre FC (9)	1–1 (1–3 p)	ES Bressane Marboz (7)
37.	Vallée du Guiers FC (8)	1–2	AS Sillingy (9)
38.	Entente Val d'Hyères (8)	0–2	Ain Sud Foot (5)

=== Sixth round ===
These matches were played on 30 and 31 October 2021.

Sixth round results: Auvergne-Rhône-Alpes
Tie no	Home team (tier)	Score	Away team (tier)
1.	FC Roche-Saint-Genest (7)	1–1 (4–5 p)	Hauts Lyonnais (5)
2.	ES Saint-Mamet (9)	0–6	FC Villefranche (3)
3.	US Saint-Flour (6)	1–4	Le Puy Foot 43 Auvergne (4)
4.	Côte Chaude Sportif (7)	1–0	AS Moulins (5)
5.	Forez Donzy FC (9)	1–2	RC Vichy (6)
6.	US Beaumontoise (7)	0–2	Montluçon Football (5)
7.	Stade Amplepuisien (8)	1–1 (2–4 p)	FC Limonest Saint-Didier (5)
8.	US Blavozy (6)	1–0	FA Le Cendre (6)
9.	FC Chamalières (4)	0–1	Moulins Yzeure Foot (4)
10.	FC Saint-Cyr Collonges au Mont d'Or (8)	2–2 (3–0 p)	Entente Crest-Aouste (7)
11.	AS Sillingy (9)	1–4	Ain Sud Foot (5)
12.	AS Villeurbanne Éveil Lyonnais (9)	0–1	Vénissieux FC (6)
13.	CS Neuville (7)	1–0	FC Vaulx-en-Velin (5)
14.	FC La Tour-Saint-Clair (7)	1–6	Lyon La Duchère (4)
15.	AS Montchat Lyon (7)	4–0	AS Misérieux-Trévoux (6)
16.	ES Bressane Marboz (7)	0–2	Andrézieux-Bouthéon FC (4)
17.	Chambéry SF (5)	1–0	GFA Rumilly-Vallières (4)
18.	ES Tarentaise (7)	1–2	FC Bourgoin-Jallieu (5)
19.	Saint-Chamond Foot (7)	2–2 (8–9 p)	Football Bourg-en-Bresse Péronnas 01 (3)
