= Filippo Marricchi =

Italian footballer

Personal information
- Date of birth: 4 February 1999 (age 27)
- Place of birth: Orvieto, Italy
- Height: 1.90 m (6 ft 3 in)
- Position: Goalkeeper

Team information
- Current team: Orvietana

Youth career
- –2013: Orvietana
- 2013–2015: Ternana
- 2015–2018: Juventus
- 2017–2018: → Novara (loan)

Senior career*
| Years | Team | Apps | (Gls) |
| 2017–2019 | Juventus | 0 | (0) |
| 2017–2019 | → Novara (loan) | 1 | (0) |
| 2019–2021 | Novara | 0 | (0) |
| 2021 | → Foligno (loan) | 17 | (0) |
| 2021–2022 | Tolentino | 9 | (0) |
| 2022 | Pianese | 0 | (0) |
| 2022– | Orvietana | 36 | (0) |

International career^{‡}
| 2015–2016 | Italy U17 | 5 | (0) |
- * Club domestic league appearances and goals as of 20 December 2023 ‡ National team caps and goals as of 6 January 2016

Filippo Marricchi (born 4 February 1999) is an Italian football player who plays for Serie D club Orvietana.

== Club career ==
He first joined Novara youth team on loan in the summer of 2017 and made several bench appearances for the senior squad in the 2017–18 Serie B season.

On 24 July 2018, he re-joined Novara (by this time relegated to Serie C) on a two-year loan with option to purchase. He made his Serie C debut for Novara on 14 October 2018 in a game against Carrarese as a 65th-minute substitute for Michele Di Gregorio.

In July 2019, his loan was converted to a permanent transfer.

On 23 January 2021, he joined Serie D club Foligno.

== International ==
He played for the Italy national under-17 football team in 2016 UEFA European Under-17 Championship qualification. He was not selected for the final tournament in favour of Alessandro Plizzari and Gabriel Meli.
