= Roger Tamba M'Pinda =

French footballer (born 1998)

Personal information
- Date of birth: 13 August 1998 (age 28)
- Place of birth: Lyon, France
- Height: 1.86 m (6 ft 1 in)
- Position: Defensive midfielder

Youth career
- –2016: Bourgoin-Jallieu
- 2016–2017: Juventus
- 2017: → Ascoli (loan)

Senior career*
Years	Team	Apps	(Gls)
2016	Bourgoin-Jallieu	3	(1)
2017–2019	Juventus	0	(0)
2017–2018	→ WSG Wattens (loan)	21	(1)
2018–2019	→ Osijek (loan)	0	(0)
2019	→ Osijek II (loan)	9	(0)
2019–2020	Apollon Limassol	4	(0)
2020–2021	Annecy	16	(0)
2021–2022	Saint-Malo	7	(1)
2022–2023	Lyon-La Duchère	21	(0)
2023	Lyon-La Duchère II	3	(0)
2023–2025	Bourg-Péronnas	34	(2)
2025–2026	Châteauroux	7	(0)
2025–2026	Châteauroux II	4	(0)
- * Club domestic league appearances and goals as of 25 January 2026

Roger Tamba M'Pinda (born 13 August 1998) is a French professional footballer who plays as a defensive midfielder.

== Club career ==
He made his Austrian Football First League debut for WSG Wattens on 25 August 2017 in a game against SV Ried.

After a loan at NK Osijek and a short spell at Apollon Limassol, Tamba M'Pinda signed for Annecy in the Championnat National.

== Career statistics ==
As of match played 16 August 2024

Appearances and goals by club, season and competition
Club	Season	League			National cup		Continental		Total	
Club	Season	Division	Apps	Goals	Apps	Goals	Apps	Goals	Apps	Goals
Bourgoin-Jallieu	2015-16	CFA 2	3	1	—		—		3	1
WSG Watten (loan)	2017-18	Austrian First League	21	1	—		—		21	1
Osijek (loan)	2018-19	HNL	0	0	—		—		0	0
Osijek II (loan)	2018-19	Druga HNL	9	0	—		—		9	0
Apollon Limassol	2018-19	Cypriot First Division	0	0	—		—		0	0
Apollon Limassol	2019-20	Cypriot First Division	4	0	—		2 (Note: Appearance(s) in UEFA Europa League)	0	6	0
Apollon Limassol	Total		4	0	—		2	0	6	0
Annecy	2020-21	Championnat National	16	0	—		—		16	0
Annecy	2021-22	Championnat National	0	0	—		—		0	0
Annecy	Total		16	0	—		—		16	0
Saint-Malo	2021-22	Championnat National 2	7	1	2	0	—		9	1
Lyon-La Duchère	2022-23	Championnat National 2	21	0	2	0	—		23	0
Lyon-La Duchère II	2022-23	Championnat National 3	3	0	—		—		3	0
Bourg-Péronnas	2023-24	Championnat National 2	25	2	1	0	—		26	2
Bourg-Péronnas	2024-25	Championnat National	1	0	—		—		1	0
Bourg-Péronnas	Total		26	2	1	0	—		27	2
Career Total			110	5	5	0	2	0	117	5
