= FC Bourgoin-Jallieu =

Association football club based in Bourgoin-Jallieu, France

Bourgoin-Jallieu
- Full name: Football Club Bourgoin-Jallieu
- Short name: FCBJ
- Founded: 1936
- Stadium: Stade Pierre Rajon
- Capacity: 9,441
- Presidents: Djemal Kolver; Osman Suyun
- Manager: Eric Guichard
- League: National 3 Group H
- 2025–26: National 3 Group H, 4th of 14
- Website: fcbourgoinjallieu.com

Football Club Bourgoin-Jallieu is a football club based in Bourgoin-Jallieu, France. It competes in the Championnat National 3, the fifth tier of the French football league system. The club's colours are sky blue and burgundy.

== History ==
The club was founded as Club Sportif Bergusien in 1936. In 1946, the club was renamed to Club Sportif Ouvrier. In 1957, FCBJ became affiliated to the French Football Federation.

In 1996, Bourgoin-Jallieu signed a partnership deal with Division 1 club Monaco. The same year, the club faced off against Martigues in the Coupe de France, who were then playing in the Division 2. In 1998, the club was promoted to the Division d'Honneur. In 2000, the club agreed to a partnership with first-tier Lens.

In 2004, after having achieved promotion the Championnat de France Amateur 2 (CFA 2) following a playoff match against Ajaccio B, the authorities decided to relegate Bourgoin-Jallieu back to the regional divisions. In 2010, the club signed a partnership with first-tier Lyon. In the 2012–13 season, FCBJ won the Coupe Rhône-Alpes and promotion to the CFA 2.

The club was promoted to Championnat National 2 for the first time at the end of the 2022–23 Championnat National 3 season, though they were relegated the following season.

On 15 January 2025, Bourgoin-Jallieu eliminated Ligue 1 club Lyon in the Coupe de France round of 32 thanks to a 4–2 victory on penalties after a 2–2 draw in regular time.

== Players ==
=== Current squad ===
As of 14 January 2022

Note: Flags indicate national team as defined under FIFA eligibility rules; some limited exceptions apply. Players may hold more than one non-FIFA nationality.

No.	Pos.	Nation	Player
—	GK	FRA	Ronan Jay
—	GK	FRA	Mustafa Erdem Adiguzel
—	GK	FRA	Clément Gehrig
—	DF	FRA	Safwan Mbae
—	DF	FRA	Joris Mendy
—	DF	FRA	Wilson Mendy
—	DF	FRA	Souleymann Diallo
—	DF	FRA	Yoann Durand
—	MF	MAR	Sofiane Atik
—	MF	FRA	Anthony Sejallon

No.	Pos.	Nation	Player
—	MF	FRA	Cyril Martin-Pichon
—	MF	ALG	Billel Moumen
—	MF	FRA	Jimmy Nirlo
—	MF	FRA	Mathias Jauneau
—	FW	FRA	Aziz Bouzit
—	FW	FRA	Jean-Bryan Boukaka
—	FW	FRA	Elian Tack
—	FW	FRA	Junior Cunha
—	FW	FRA	Arnaud Sanchez
—	FW	FRA	Rémy Baty

=== Notable former players ===
- (France) Jérémy Clément
- (France) Ottman Dadoune
- (France) Naïs Djouahra
- (Algeria) Amine Gouiri
- (France) Malo Gusto (youth)
- (France) Enzo Lombardo
- (Cameroon) Bryan Mbeumo
- (France) Florian Michel
- (France) Kévin Monnet-Paquet
- (France) Elisha Owusu
- (France) Maxence Rivera (youth)
- (France) Yoan Severin
- (France) Roger Tamba M'Pinda
- (France) Giovani Versini
- (Central African Republic) Amos Youga
