= 2026–27 Genoa CFC season =

Genoa
2026–27 season
- Owner: Dan Șucu
- President: Dan Șucu
- Head coach: Daniele De Rossi
- Stadium: Stadio Luigi Ferraris
- Serie A: 13th
- Coppa Italia: Round of 16
- Top goalscorer: League: Milutin Osmajić (4); All: Milutin Osmajić (4)
- Highest home attendance: 33,113 vs Napoli; 22 August 2026, Serie A
- Lowest home attendance: 13,000 vs Ascoli; 16 August 2026, Coppa Italia
- Biggest win: 4–1 vs Ascoli (H); 16 August 2026, Coppa Italia
- Biggest defeat: 1–4 vs Como (H); 4 September 2026, Serie A
Home colours	Away colours

The 2026–27 season is the 134th season in the history of Genoa Cricket and Football Club, and the club's fourth consecutive season in Serie A. In addition to the domestic league, the club is also participating in the Coppa Italia.

== Players ==
=== First-team squad ===
As of 8 October 2026

Note: Flags indicate national team as defined under FIFA eligibility rules; some limited exceptions apply. Players may hold more than one non-FIFA nationality.

No.	Pos.	Nation	Player
1	GK	NED	Justin Bijlow
2	DF	ALB	Mario Mitaj (on loan from Al-Ittihad)
3	DF	NED	Kingsley Ehizibue
4	MF	BRA	Alex Amorim
5	DF	NOR	Leo Østigård
8	MF	ITA	Tommaso Baldanzi (on loan from Roma)
9	FW	POR	Vitinha
10	FW	BRA	Júnior Messias
11	MF	SUI	Ethan Meichtry
16	DF	ENG	Cody Drameh
17	FW	AUT	Elias Havel
18	FW	MNE	Milutin Osmajić
19	FW	ALB	Joi Nuredini
20	DF	ITA	Stefano Sabelli

No.	Pos.	Nation	Player
22	DF	MEX	Johan Vásquez (captain)
25	MF	CIV	Hamed Traorè (on loan from Marseille)
27	DF	ITA	Alessandro Marcandalli
29	FW	ITA	Lorenzo Colombo
31	DF	AUT	David Puczka
32	MF	DEN	Morten Frendrup
34	DF	DEN	Sebastian Otoa
39	GK	ITA	Daniele Sommariva
71	MF	ITA	Samuel Wiafe
76	FW	ITA	Lorenzo Venturino
77	MF	ISL	Mikael Egill Ellertsson
92	FW	ITA	Stephan El Shaarawy
97	MF	SUI	Djibril Sow
99	GK	AUT	Franz Stolz

=== Primavera ===
Note: Flags indicate national team as defined under FIFA eligibility rules; some limited exceptions apply. Players may hold more than one non-FIFA nationality.

No.	Pos.	Nation	Player
14	DF	LTU	Lukas Klišys
21	FW	BRA	Robinho Júnior (on loan from Santos)
74	DF	FRA	Mamedi Doucouré

No.	Pos.	Nation	Player
75	MF	FRA	Gaël Lafont
85	DF	GBS	Marcelo Vaz
93	GK	LAT	Rendijs Mihelsons

=== Out on loan ===
As of 16 September 2026

Note: Flags indicate national team as defined under FIFA eligibility rules; some limited exceptions apply. Players may hold more than one non-FIFA nationality.

No.	Pos.	Nation	Player
—	GK	ITA	Simone Calvani (at Vado until 30 June 2027)
—	GK	LTU	Ernestas Lysionok (at Dolomiti Bellunesi until 30 June 2027)
—	DF	ITA	Gabriele Calvani (at Frosinone until 30 June 2027)
—	DF	ITA	Lorenzo Gagliardi (at Team Altamura until 30 June 2027)
—	DF	ITA	Edoardo Meconi (at Gubbio until 30 June 2027)
—	DF	BFA	Latif Ouedraogo (at Rapid București until 30 June 2027)
—	DF	ITA	Tommaso Pittino (at Livorno until 30 June 2027)
—	DF	ITA	Gianluca Rossi (at Treviso until 30 June 2027)

No.	Pos.	Nation	Player
—	MF	BFA	Chec Bebel Doumbia (at Rapid București until 30 June 2027)
—	MF	ITA	Patrizio Masini (at Frosinone until 30 June 2027)
—	FW	PAR	Hugo Cuenca (at Celta Vigo B until 30 June 2027)
—	FW	ITA	Alessandro Debenedetti (at Cesena until 30 June 2027)
—	FW	ITA	Seydou Fini (at Frosinone until 30 June 2027)
—	FW	ITA	Gabriele Pessolani (at Crema until 30 June 2027)
—	FW	SVK	Adam Žulevič (at Iraklis until 30 June 2027)

== Transfers ==
=== Summer window ===
==== In ====
Date	Pos.	Player	From	Fee	Notes	Ref.
29 June 2026	DF	(Guinea-Bissau) Marcelo Vaz	(Italy) Varesina	€300,000	Joined Primavera squad	
1 July 2026	FW	(Italy) Lorenzo Colombo	(Italy) Milan	€7,000,000	Loan made permanent transfer	
1 July 2026	MF	(Switzerland) Ethan Meichtry	(Switzerland) Thun	€4,000,000		
2 July 2026	DF	(Austria) David Puczka	(Italy) Juventus Next Gen	€6,000,000		
2 July 2026	MF	(Italy) Samuel Wiafe	(Italy) Modena	€3,000,000		
10 July 2026	FW	(Austria) Elias Havel	(Austria) TSV Hartberg	€2,000,000		
6 August 2026	MF	(Switzerland) Djibril Sow	(Spain) Sevilla	€4,000,000		
24 August 2026	FW	(Montenegro) Milutin Osmajić	(England) Preston North End	€2,500,000	+ €1,000,000 in add-ons	
1 September 2026	DF	(England) Cody Drameh	(England) Hull City	€4,500,000		
2 September 2026	FW	(Italy) Stephan El Shaarawy	Unattached	Free		
3 September 2026	DF	(Netherlands) Kingsley Ehizibue	Unattached	Free		

==== Loans in ====
Date	Pos.	Player	From	Fee	Notes	Ref.
17 July 2026	FW	(Ivory Coast) Hamed Traorè	(France) Marseille	€2,000,000	Option to buy for €10,000,000	
31 July 2026	DF	(Albania) Mario Mitaj	(Saudi Arabia) Al-Ittihad	€2,000,000	Option to buy for €4,500,000	
1 September 2026	FW	(Brazil) Robinho Júnior	(Brazil) Santos	Free	Option to buy for €8,000,000, joined Primavera squad	

==== Loan returns ====
Date	Pos.	Player	From	Fee	Notes	Ref.
30 June 2026	GK	(Italy) Simone Calvani	(Italy) Forlì	Free		
30 June 2026	GK	(Italy) Leonardo Consiglio	(Italy) Dolomiti Bellunesi	Free		
30 June 2026	GK	(Austria) Franz Stolz	(Austria) Grazer AK	Free		
30 June 2026	DF	(Italy) Matteo Barbini	(Italy) Dolomiti Bellunesi	Free		
30 June 2026	DF	(Italy) Lorenzo Gagliardi	(Italy) Pineto	Free		
30 June 2026	DF	(Uruguay) Alan Matturro	(Spain) Levante	Free	Option to buy not exercised	
30 June 2026	DF	(Italy) Edoardo Meconi	(Italy) Pergolettese	Free		
30 June 2026	DF	(Italy) Tommaso Pittino	(Italy) Dolomiti Bellunesi	Free		
30 June 2026	DF	(Italy) Alessandro Vogliacco	(Greece) PAOK	Free	Option to buy not exercised	
30 June 2026	MF	(Paraguay) Hugo Cuenca	(Spain) Burgos Promesas	Free	Option to buy not exercised	
30 June 2026	MF	(Burkina Faso) Chec Bebel Doumbia	(Italy) Altamura	Free		
30 June 2026	MF	(Italy) Gabriele Pessolani	(Italy) Pergolettese	Free		
30 June 2026	MF	(Italy) Gianluca Rossi	(Italy) Renate	Free		
30 June 2026	FW	(Nigeria) David Ankeye	(Cyprus) Krasava ENY Ypsonas	Free		
30 June 2026	FW	(Italy) Alessandro Debenedetti	(Italy) Virtus Entella	Free		
30 June 2026	FW	(Italy) Daniel Fossati	(Italy) Follonica Gavorrano	Free		
30 June 2026	FW	(Italy) Lorenzo Venturino	(Italy) Roma	Free	Option to buy not exercised	

==== Out ====
Date	Pos.	Player	To	Fee	Notes	Ref.
1 July 2026	GK	(Italy) Nicola Leali	(Italy) Hellas Verona	Free	End of contract	
1 July 2026	MF	(Ukraine) Ruslan Malinovskyi	(Turkey) Trabzonspor	Free	End of contract	
1 July 2026	FW	(Italy) Jeff Ekhator	(Italy) Juventus	€16,400,000	+ €2,000,000 in add-ons	
1 July 2026	FW	(Ghana) Caleb Ekuban	(Italy) Hellas Verona	Free	End of contract	
1 July 2026	FW	(Italy) Daniel Fossati	(Italy) Rovato	Free	End of contract	
2 July 2026	GK	(Italy) Leonardo Consiglio	(Italy) Modena	Free		
4 July 2026	FW	(Nigeria) David Ankeye	(Serbia) Železničar Pančevo	€500,000		
6 August 2026	DF	(Italy) Alessandro Vogliacco	(Italy) Cremonese	€500,000		
26 August 2026	DF	(Uruguay) Alan Matturro	(Ukraine) Shakhtar Donetsk	€5,000,000	+ €1,000,000 in add-ons	
1 September 2026	DF	(Spain) Aarón Martín	(Spain) Racing Santander	€2,000,000		
1 September 2026	DF	(England) Brooke Norton-Cuffy	(England) Hull City	€14,000,000		

==== Loans out ====
Date	Pos.	Player	To	Fee	Notes	Ref.
7 July 2026	DF	(Italy) Edoardo Meconi	(Italy) Gubbio	Free		
8 July 2026	DF	(Italy) Lorenzo Gagliardi	(Italy) Altamura	Free		
15 July 2026	MF	(Italy) Gianluca Rossi	(Italy) Treviso	Free		
18 July 2026	DF	(Italy) Tommaso Pittino	(Italy) Livorno	Free		
24 July 2026	GK	(Italy) Simone Calvani	(Italy) Vado	Free		
27 July 2026	MF	(Italy) Gabriele Pessolani	(Italy) Crema	Free		
4 August 2026	MF	(Paraguay) Hugo Cuenca	(Spain) Celta Fortuna	Free	Option to buy for €1,000,000	
4 August 2026	FW	(Italy) Alessandro Debenedetti	(Italy) Cesena	Free		
10 August 2026	MF	(Italy) Patrizio Masini	(Italy) Frosinone	Free	Obligation to buy for an undisclosed fee under certain conditions	
18 August 2026	MF	(Burkina Faso) Chec Bebel Doumbia	(Romania) Rapid București	Free		
30 August 2026	GK	(Lithuania) Ernestas Lysionok	(Italy) Dolomiti Bellunesi	Free		
1 September 2026	DF	(Italy) Matteo Barbini	(Italy) Dolomiti Bellunesi	Free		

==== Loans ended ====
Date	Pos.	Player	To	Fee	Notes	Ref.
30 June 2026	GK	(Switzerland) Benjamin Siegrist	(Romania) Rapid București	Free		
30 June 2026	DF	(Sweden) Nils Zätterström	(England) Sheffield United	Free	Option to buy not exercised	
30 June 2026	MF	(Cameroon) Jean Onana	(Turkey) Beşiktaş	Free	Option to buy not exercised	
30 June 2026	FW	(Ivory Coast) Maxwel Cornet	(England) West Ham United	Free	Option to buy not exercised	

== Friendlies ==
19 July 2026	Genoa (Italy)	2–1	(Italy) Trento
17:00	Colombo 66'; Puczka 73'

25 July 2026	Genoa (Italy)	2–2	(Italy) Vicenza
17:00	Amorim 42'; Colombo 58' (pen.)

1 August 2026	Leicester City (England)	0–1	(Italy) Genoa
20:30			Colombo 69'

4 August 2026	Bournemouth (England)	10–1	(Italy) Genoa
14:00

8 August 2026	Genoa (Italy)	0–1	(Spain) Deportivo A Coruña
20:45

== Competitions ==
=== Overall record ===
Competition	First match	Last match	Starting round	Final position	Record							
Competition	First match	Last match	Starting round	Final position	Pld	W	D	L	GF	GA	GD	Win %
Serie A	22 August 2026	30 May 2027	Matchday 1	TBD	11	4	1	6	11	16	−5	36.36
Coppa Italia	16 August 2026	TBD	First round	TBD	2	2	0	0	5	1	+4	100.00
Total					13	6	1	6	16	17	−1	46.15

Last updated: 8 November 2026
Source: Soccerway

=== Serie A ===
Pos	Team	Pld	W	D	L	GF	GA	GD	Pts
11	Torino	11	4	2	5	15	17	−2	14
12	Atalanta	11	4	2	5	17	20	−3	14
13	Genoa	11	4	1	6	11	16	−5	13
14	Lecce	11	3	1	7	12	22	−10	10
15	Fiorentina	11	2	3	6	17	25	−8	9

Updated to match(es) played on 8 November 2026. Source: Serie A
Rules for classification: 1) Points; 2) Head-to-head points; 3) Head-to-head goal difference; 4) Goal difference; 5) Goals scored; 6) Drawing of lots.
End-of-season ties on points for 1st or 17th are instead decided by a one- or two-leg play-off, respectively, unless the play-off would involve a UEFA competition finalist (in which case rules 2–6 apply). Rules 2–6 determine home advantage (for 17th, the better-ranked team hosts the second leg); if three or more teams are tied, they also select the two play-off teams.

==== Results summary ====
Overall								Home						Away					
Pld	W	D	L	GF	GA	GD	Pts	W	D	L	GF	GA	GD	W	D	L	GF	GA	GD
11	4	1	6	11	16	−5	13	3	1	3	8	10	−2	1	0	3	3	6	−3

Last updated: 8 November 2026.
Source: Serie A

==== Results by round ====
Round	1	2	3	4	5	6	7	8	9	10	11
Ground	H	A	H	H	A	H	A	H	H	A	H
Result	L	L	L	D	L	W	L	W	W	W	L
Position	17	16	19	19	19	17	17	13	13	11	13

Updated to match(es) played on 8 November 2026. Source: Serie A
A = Away; H = Home; W = Win; D = Draw; L = Loss

==== Matches ====
22 August 2026 1	Genoa	0–2	Napoli	Genoa
20:45 CEST (UTC+2)	Østigård (yellow card) 85'; Sabelli (yellow card) 85'	Report	Politano (yellow card) 54'; De Bruyne 82'; Vergara 87'	Stadium: Stadio Luigi Ferraris; Attendance: 33,113; Referee: Marco Di Bello

30 August 2026 2	Lazio	1–0	Genoa	Rome
20:45 CEST (UTC+2)	Frattesi 25'; Zaccagni (yellow card) 90+5'	Report	Østigård (yellow card) 14'; Amorim (yellow card) 90+5'	Stadium: Stadio Olimpico; Attendance: 6,058; Referee: Ermanno Feliciani

4 September 2026 3	Genoa	1–4	Como	Genoa
20:45 CEST (UTC+2)	Osmajić 19'; Sow (yellow card) 36'; Østigård (yellow card) 62'	Report	Baturina 25', (yellow card) 60'; Diao 30', 78'; Paz 40'	Stadium: Stadio Luigi Ferraris; Attendance: 30,102; Referee: Marco Guida

=== Coppa Italia ===
16 August 2026 First round	Genoa	4–1	Ascoli	Genoa
18:30 CEST (UTC+2)	Marcandalli 42'; Baldanzi 45'; Colombo 61'; Havel 80'	Report	Silipo 25'	Stadium: Stadio Luigi Ferraris; Attendance: 13,000; Referee: Mario Perri

15 September 2026 Second round	Genoa	1–0	Südtirol	Genoa
18:00 CEST (UTC+2)	Vásquez 87'	Report		Stadium: Stadio Luigi Ferraris; Attendance: 6,509; Referee: Gianluca Manganiello

1 December 2026 Round of 16	Internazionale	v	Genoa	Milan
21:00 CET (UTC+1)		Report		Stadium: San Siro
