= Mario Cantero =

Spanish footballer

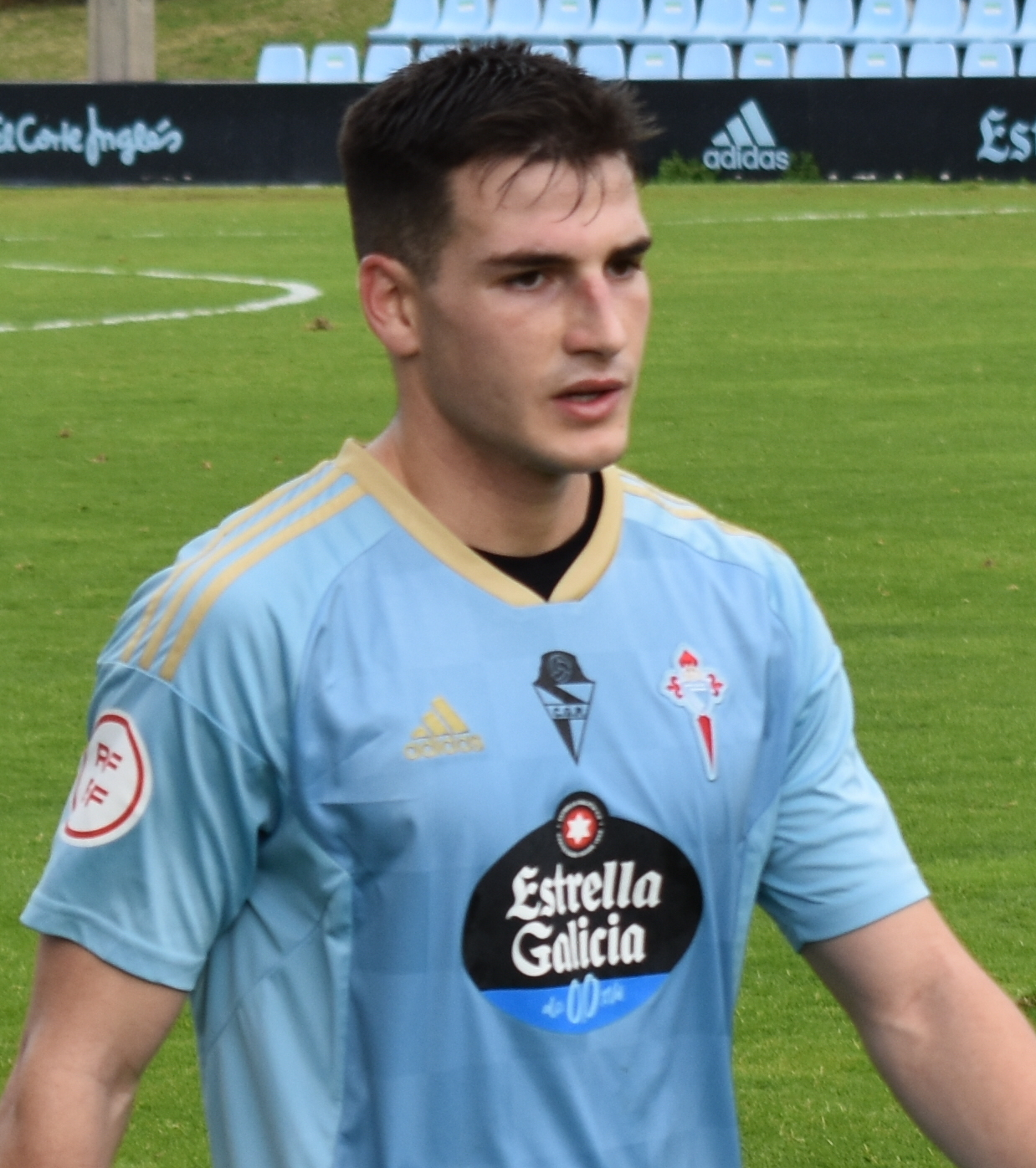
- Cantero with Celta C in 2022

Personal information
- Full name: Mario Cantero Mariño
- Date of birth: 13 March 2002 (age 24)
- Place of birth: Vigo, Spain
- Height: 1.75 m (5 ft 9 in)
- Position: Midfielder

Team information
- Current team: Burgos
- Number: 17

Youth career
- 2016–2021: Celta

Senior career*
Years	Team	Apps	(Gls)
2021–2024	Celta C	88	(4)
2023–2024	Celta B	1	(0)
2024–2025	Burgos B	11	(2)
2024–	Burgos	22	(0)
- * Club domestic league appearances and goals as of 6 June 2026

Mario Cantero Mariño (born 13 March 2002) is a Spanish footballer who plays as a midfielder for Burgos CF.

== Career ==
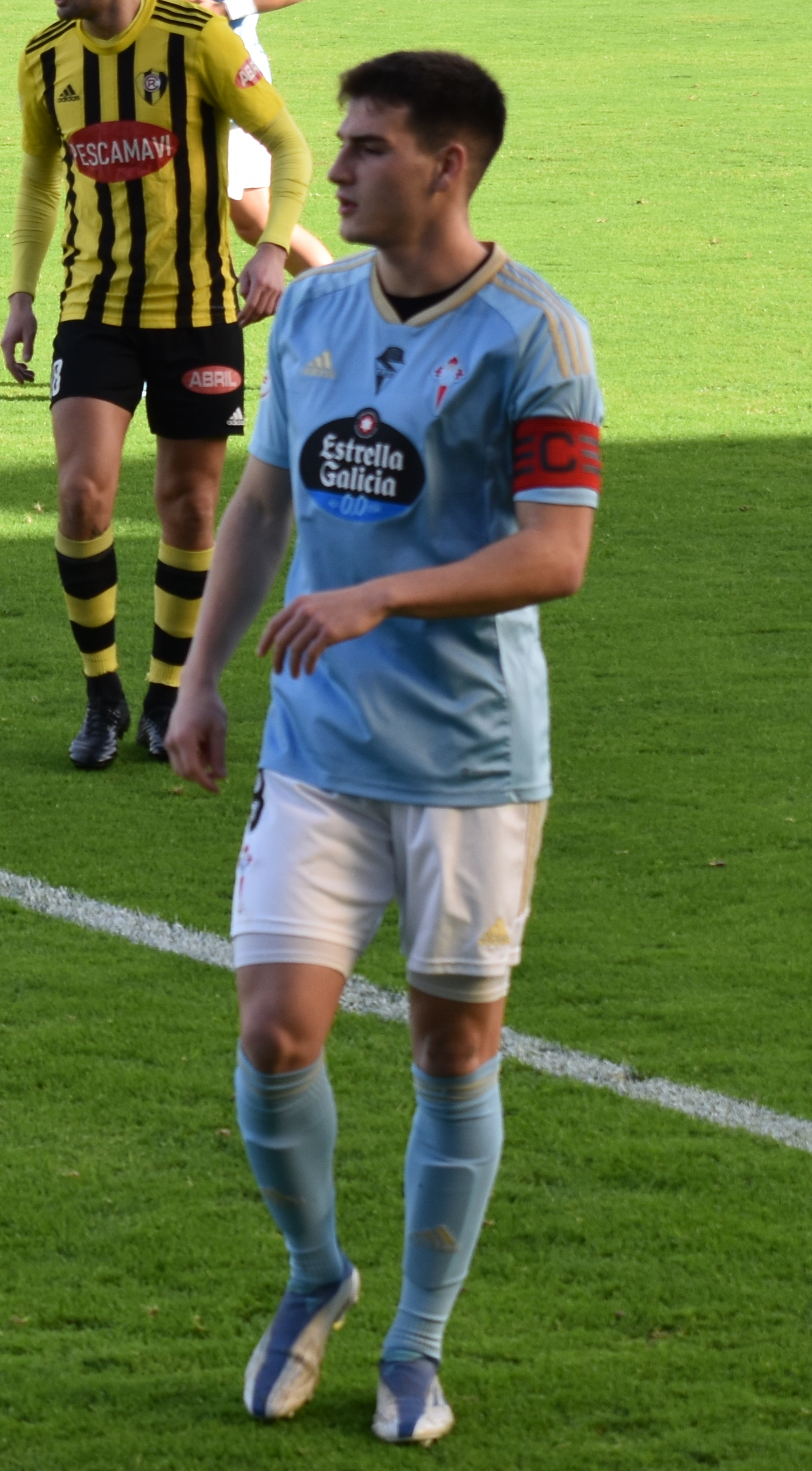
Cantero playing for Celta C in 2022

Cantero was born in Vigo, Galicia, and joined RC Celta de Vigo's youth sides in 2016, aged 14. In August 2021, after finishing his formation, he was assigned to farm team Gran Peña FC in the regional leagues.

Cantero subsequently established himself as a regular starter for Gran Peña, helping in their promotion to Tercera Federación. He first appeared with the reserves on 9 December 2023, coming on as a late substitute for Raúl Blanco in a 2–0 Primera Federación home win over Cultural y Deportiva Leonesa, but left the club on 5 July 2024.

On 30 July 2024, Cantero joined Burgos CF and was initially assigned to the B-team also in the fifth division. He made his professional debut on 23 November, replacing Curro Sánchez late into a 1–0 Segunda División home win over SD Eibar.

== Personal life ==
Cantero comes from a family of footballers: his grandfather José Antonio was a goalkeeper, while his father Ignacio and brother Diego are defenders; all of them represented Celta.
