= Robinho Júnior =

Brazilian footballer (born 2007)

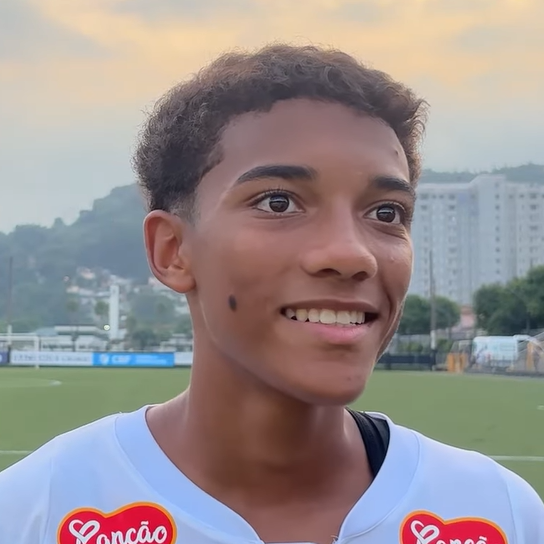
- Robinho Júnior in 2025

Personal information
- Full name: Robson de Souza Júnior
- Date of birth: 17 December 2007 (age 18)
- Place of birth: Santos, Brazil
- Height: 1.78 m (5 ft 10 in)
- Position: Right winger

Team information
- Current team: Genoa (on loan from Santos)
- Number: 21

Youth career
- 2022–: Santos
- 2026–: → Genoa (loan)

Senior career*
Years	Team	Apps	(Gls)
2025–	Santos	24	(0)
2026–	→ Genoa (loan)	1	(0)

International career^{‡}
2026–	Brazil U20	1	(2)
- * Club domestic league appearances and goals as of 23:16, 17 October 2026 (UTC) ‡ National team caps and goals as of 10:00, 17 November 2026 (UTC)

Robson de Souza Júnior (born 17 December 2007), known as Robinho Júnior or Juninho, is a Brazilian professional footballer who plays as a right winger for Serie A club Genoa, on loan from Campeonato Brasileiro Série A club Santos.

== Early life ==
Son of the international footballer Robinho, Robinho Júnior was born in Santos, São Paulo, with his father playing in Real Madrid at that time. He joined the youth categories of Santos FC in May 2022, aged 14, and signed a youth contract with the club in June.

== Club career ==
=== Santos ===
==== Youth ====
Robinho Júnior was promoted to Santos' under-17 squad for the 2023 season, but only started to feature regularly for the side in the following year. On 9 August 2024, he signed his first professional contract with the club, with a release clause of € 50 million.

Robinho Júnior was champion of Santos' under-17s in the Campeonato Paulista Sub-17 in 2024, scoring nine goals and being the side's top scorer in the competition along with Lucca Amaro. In 2025, he was promoted to the under-20s, and competed in the Copa São Paulo de Futebol Júnior.

On 19 February 2025, Robinho Júnior was registered with the first team squad in the 2025 Campeonato Paulista. On 9 July, shortly after being registered in the 2025 Brasileirão, he was handed the number 7 jersey in the first team, a shirt which landmarked his father's career at the club.

==== First team debut ====
Robinho Júnior made his unofficial first team debut on 10 July 2025, coming on as a second-half substitute in a 3–1 friendly win over Desportiva Ferroviária, providing an assist to Diego Pituca's goal. He made his professional – and Série A – debut six days later, replacing Álvaro Barreal in a 1–0 home win over Flamengo.

A permanent member of the first team squad in the 2026 season, Robinho Júnior renewed his link with the club until March 2031 on 17 April of that year. After controversies and a lack of playing time, he asked to be called Juninho – a nickname he used in the youth categories – and scored his first unofficial goal for the first team on 5 July, netting the third in a 3–0 friendly win over União São João.

==== Loan to Genoa ====
On 2 September 2026, Serie A club Genoa announced the signing of Robinho Júnior on a one-year loan deal, with a buyout clause. After playing in a friendly match against Rapid București, he made his official debut on 17 October, replacing compatriot Junior Messias in a 2–0 away loss to Roma.

== International career ==
On 30 October 2026, Robinho Júnior was called up to the Brazil national under-20 team for two friendlies against Peru. He made his international debut on 17 November, coming on at half-time and scoring a brace in the 9–0 win.

== Personal life ==
Due to his father's arrest, Robinho Júnior lived his personal life with extreme discretion, without many appearances or activity on social networks. He received psychological support from Santos FC during his father's prosecution, but maintains a good relationship with him, playing some games wearing an undershirt in his honor. He is also a declared fan of Neymar in addition to professing the Christian faith.

Santos opened an investigation into Neymar after the player allegedly physically assaulted Robinho Júnior by tripping him and giving him a "violent slap to the face" in retaliation for Robinho Júnior dribbling past him during a training session at the CT Rei Pelé on 3 May 2026. Neymar later apologised for the incident, and Robinho Júnior's representatives subsequently gave up on notifying the club.

== Career statistics ==
As of match played 17 October 2026

Appearances and goals by club, season and competition
Club	Season	League			State league		National cup		Continental		Total	
Club	Season	Division	Apps	Goals	Apps	Goals	Apps	Goals	Apps	Goals	Apps	Goals
Santos	2025	Série A	15	0	—		—		—		15	0
Santos	2026	Série A	4	0	5	0	0	0	3 (Note: Appearances in Copa Sudamericana)	0	12	0
Santos	Total		19	0	5	0	0	0	3	0	27	0
Genoa (loan)	2026–27	Serie A	1	0	—		0	0	—		1	0
Career total			20	0	5	0	0	0	3	0	28	0

== Honours ==
Santos U17

- Campeonato Paulista Sub-17: 2024

Santos U20

- Campeonato Paulista Sub-20: 2025
