= Fermín García =

Spanish footballer

Personal information
- Full name: Fermín García Murillo
- Date of birth: 30 September 2003 (age 23)
- Place of birth: Pamplona, Spain
- Height: 1.77 m (5 ft 10 in)
- Position: Winger

Team information
- Current team: Burgos
- Number: 31

Youth career
- 2008–2022: Txantrea

Senior career*
Years	Team	Apps	(Gls)
2022–2023	Txantrea	24	(4)
2023–2024	Valle de Egüés	30	(3)
2024–2025	Burgos B	32	(6)
2025–	Burgos	15	(0)
- * Club domestic league appearances and goals as of 14 May 2026

Fermín García Murillo (born 30 September 2003) is a Spanish footballer who plays as a winger for Burgos CF.

== Career ==
Born in Pamplona, Navarre, García joined the youth categories of hometown side UDC Txantrea at the age of five. He was promoted to the first team ahead of the 2022–23 season in Tercera Federación, and featured regularly before moving to Segunda Federación side CD Valle de Egüés in July 2023.

On 25 July 2024, García joined Burgos CF and was initially assigned to the reserves also in the fifth division. He made his first team debut on 22 September of the following year, coming on as a second-half substitute for Mateo Mejía and providing the assist to Grego Sierra's equalizer in a 1–1 Segunda División home draw against Granada CF.

On 12 March 2026, García renewed his link with the Burgaleses until 2029.
