= Ethan Ventosa =

Spanish footballer

Personal information
- Full name: Ethan Ventosa González
- Date of birth: 11 February 2004 (age 22)
- Place of birth: Burgos, Spain
- Position: Attacking midfielder

Team information
- Current team: Burgos B
- Number: 10

Youth career
- 2016–2020: Burgos Promesas 2000
- 2020–2023: Burgos

Senior career*
Years	Team	Apps	(Gls)
2022–	Burgos B	104	(7)
2025–	Burgos	0	(0)
- * Club domestic league appearances and goals as of 14 May 2026

Ethan Ventosa González (born 11 February 2004) is a Spanish footballer who plays as an attacking midfielder for Burgos CF Promesas.

== Career ==
Born in Burgos, Castile and León, Ventosa joined Burgos CF's youth sides in 2020, after the club integrated his former side CD Burgos Promesas 2000 into their structure. He made his senior debut with the reserves on 30 October 2022, coming on as a late substitute for Saúl del Cerro in a 2–1 Segunda Federación away win over Coruxo FC.

Ventosa scored his first senior goal on 29 April 2023, netting the B's equalizer in a 2–1 home loss to Real Valladolid Promesas. In July of that year, he was definitely promoted to the B-team, now in Tercera Federación.

On 9 July 2025, after helping Burgos Promesas to return to the fourth division, Ventosa renewed his contract with the club. He made his first team debut on 4 December, replacing Víctor Mollejo in a 1–0 away win over Real Zaragoza, for the season's Copa del Rey.
