= Hugo Cuenca (footballer) =

Paraguayan footballer (born 2005)

Personal information
- Full name: Hugo Francisco Cuenca Martínez
- Date of birth: 8 January 2005 (age 21)
- Place of birth: Coronel Oviedo, Paraguay
- Height: 1.83 m (6 ft 0 in)
- Positions: Attacking midfielder; winger

Team information
- Current team: Celta B (on loan from Genoa)
- Number: 17

Youth career
- –2022: Deportivo Capiatá
- 2022–2024: AC Milan

Senior career*
Years	Team	Apps	(Gls)
2024–2025	Milan Futuro (res.)	9	(0)
2024–2025	AC Milan	0	(0)
2025–	Genoa	0	(0)
2026	→ Burgos B (loan)	9	(2)
2026–	→ Celta B (loan)	0	(0)

International career^{‡}
2019	Paraguay U15	6	(0)
2020	Paraguay U17	3	(0)
2024–	Paraguay	3	(0)
- * Club domestic league appearances and goals as of 14 May 2026 ‡ National team caps and goals as of 14 October 2025

Hugo Francisco Cuenca Martínez (born 8 January 2005) is a Paraguayan professional footballer who plays as an attacking midfielder and winger for Segunda División club Celta Fortuna, on loan from Serie A club Genoa. He also plays for the Paraguay national team.

== Club career ==
=== Early career ===
Born in Coronel Oviedo, Paraguay, Cuenca played football through the youth system of Deportivo Capiatá, before going on a series of trials with AC Milan, starting from December 2019, and finally joining the Italian club in August 2022, as he signed a three-year professional contract in the process. He was subsequently included in the first team's pre-season campaign shortly after his signing, and went on to feature in several friendly matches.

=== AC Milan and Milan Futuro ===
Throughout the whole 2022–23 season, Cuenca played for AC Milan's under-19 team, scoring four goals – one of which, a strike against Hellas Verona, was nominated for goal of the season – and four assists in twenty-eight games; he also helped the team reach the UEFA Youth League semi-finals for the first time in their history, although they were eventually eliminated by Croatian side Hajduk Split.

In the summer of 2023, Cuenca was once again included in the first-team squad by manager Stefano Pioli ahead of the 2023–24 season. He began training with the first team in January 2024.

He joined AC Milan for their 2024–25 pre-season, getting some minutes of playing time in the friendly matches. Cuenca made his professional debut on 10 August 2024, starting for the newly created reserve team Milan Futuro, on a 3–0 away win Coppa Italia Serie C first round match against Lecco.

On 31 August 2024, Cuenca received his first call-up with AC Milan, as an unused substitute for a 2–2 away draw Serie A match against Lazio.

=== Genoa ===
He moved to fellow Serie A club Genoa on 3 February 2025, permanently on a free transfer.

Cuenca made his debut with Genoa on 3 December 2025, during a 4–0 away loss 2025–26 Coppa Italia match against Atalanta.

==== Loans in Spain ====
On 2 February 2026, Cuenca moved to Spain and joined Segunda División club Burgos, on a six-month loan until the end of the season. However, he only played for the B-team in Segunda Federación.

On 4 August 2026, Cuenca was announced at Celta de Vigo's reserves in the second division, also on loan.

== International career ==
Cuenca has represented Paraguay at under-15 and under-17 levels.

He received his first call-up with the Paraguay national team for the 2026 FIFA World Cup qualification matches against Uruguay and Brazil on 6 and 10 September 2024, respectively. Cuenca debuted against Brazil at the Estadio Defensores del Chaco. He substituted Miguel Almirón in the 86th minute as Paraguay won 1–0.

== Personal life ==
Born in Paraguay, Cuenca also holds a Spanish passport, which he acquired in order to accommodate his move to AC Milan (due to transfer rules for non-EU players).

== Career statistics ==
=== Club ===
As of match played 3 December 2025

Appearances and goals by club, season and competition
Club	Season	League			National cup		Other		Total	
Club	Season	Division	Apps	Goals	Apps	Goals	Apps	Goals	Apps	Goals
Milan Futuro	2024–25	Serie C	9	0	2 (Note: Appearances in Coppa Italia Serie C)	0	—		11	0
Milan Futuro	Total		9	0	2	0	—		11	0
AC Milan	2024–25	Serie A	0	0	—		—		0	0
AC Milan	Total		0	0	—		—		0	0
Genoa	2024–25	Serie A	0	0	—		—		0	0
Genoa	2025–26	Serie A	0	0	1 (Note: Appearance in Coppa Italia)	0	—		0	0
Genoa	Total		0	0	1	0	0	0	0	0
Career total			9	0	3	0	0	0	12	0

=== International ===
As of match played 14 October 2025

Appearances and goals by national team and year
National team	Year	Apps	Goals
Paraguay	2024	1	0
Paraguay	2025	2	0
Total		3	0
