= Irian Ribas =

Spanish footballer

Personal information
- Full name: Irian Ribas Carrasco
- Date of birth: 28 April 2005 (age 21)
- Place of birth: Santa Cruz de Tenerife, Spain
- Position: Forward

Team information
- Current team: Burgos B
- Number: 9

Youth career
- Tenerife
- 2023–2024: Burgos

Senior career*
Years	Team	Apps	(Gls)
2024–	Burgos B	50	(12)
2026–	Burgos	1	(1)
- * Club domestic league appearances and goals as of 13 November 2026

Irian Ribas Carrasco (born 28 April 2005) is a Spanish footballer who plays as a forward for Burgos CF Promesas.

== Career ==
Born in Santa Cruz de Tenerife, Canary Islands, Ribas played for CD Tenerife before joining the Juvenil squad of Burgos CF in December 2023. He made his senior debut with the latter's reserves the following 23 March, playing 19 minutes in a 2–1 Tercera Federación home loss to Real Ávila CF.

Ribas quickly established himself as a starter for Burgos Promesas before a heart condition sidelined him for six months. Upon returning, he helped the side to achieve promotion to Segunda Federación, and renewed his contract until 2028 on 24 September 2026.

Ribas made his first team debut with the Blanquinegros on 29 October 2026, starting in a 4–2 away win over CD Laredo, for the season's Copa del Rey. He made his professional debut on 13 November, coming on as a second-half substitute for Javi Llabrés and scoring his side's only in a 3–1 Segunda División away loss to CD Leganés.
