= Jeff Ekhator =

Italian footballer (born 2006)

Personal information
- Full name: Jeff Osayuki Ekhator
- Date of birth: 11 November 2006 (age 20)
- Place of birth: Genoa, Italy
- Height: 1.88 m (6 ft 2 in)
- Position: Forward

Team information
- Current team: Juventus
- Number: 18

Youth career
- 2010–2015: Don Bosco
- 2015–2024: Genoa

Senior career*
Years	Team	Apps	(Gls)
2024–2026	Genoa	54	(4)
2026–	Juventus	1	(0)

International career^{‡}
2024–2025	Italy U19	11	(3)
2025–	Italy U21	8	(3)
2026–	Italy	1	(0)
- * Club domestic league appearances and goals as of 8 November 2026 ‡ National team caps and goals as of 16 November 2026

Jeff Osayuki Ekhator (born 11 November 2006) is an Italian professional footballer who plays as a forward for Serie A club Juventus and the Italy national team.

== Club career ==
=== Genoa ===
Ekhator was born in Genoa, Italy to Nigerian parents.

Ekhator started playing football at Don Bosco, a grassroots club based in the Sampierdarena area of Genoa; after being noticed by the scouts of Sampdoria, Virtus Entella and Genoa, he joined the latter club's youth academy at the age of eight. He then came through the Rossoblu's youth ranks, as he eventually featured both for the under-18 and under-19 teams during the 2023–24 season, helping the former side win the national title.

In July 2024, Ekhator started training with Genoa's first team during their pre-season camp, under manager Alberto Gilardino. On 9 August 2024, he made his professional debut for the club, coming on as a substitute in the 84th minute of a 1–0 win over Reggiana in the first round of the Coppa Italia. On 17 August, he made his Serie A debut, coming on for Milan Badelj in the 86th minute of a 2–2 league draw with Inter Milan.

== International career ==
Ekhator has made six appearances and scored one goal for the Italy U19 side.

In May 2026, he was one of the players who were called up with the Italy national senior squad by interim head coach Silvio Baldini, for the friendly matches against Luxembourg and Greece on 3 and 7 June 2026, respectively.

== Career statistics ==
=== Club ===
As of match played 8 November 2026

Appearances and goals by club, season and competition
Club	Season	League			Coppa Italia		Europe		Total	
Club	Season	Division	Apps	Goals	Apps	Goals	Apps	Goals	Apps	Goals
Genoa	2024–25	Serie A	24	1	1	0	—		25	1
Genoa	2025–26	Serie A	30	3	2	1	—		32	4
Genoa	Total		54	4	3	1	—		57	5
Juventus	2026–27	Serie A	1	0	0	0	1 (Note: Appearance in UEFA Europa League)	0	2	0
Career total			55	4	3	1	1	0	59	5

=== International ===
As of match played 7 June 2026

Appearances and goals by national team and year
National team	Year	Apps	Goals
Italy	2026	1	0
Total		1	0
