= David Puczka =

Austrian footballer (born 2005)

Personal information
- Date of birth: 25 January 2005 (age 21)
- Place of birth: Austria
- Height: 1.83 m (6 ft 0 in)
- Positions: Defender; midfielder; winger

Team information
- Current team: Genoa
- Number: 31

Youth career
- –2013: Favoritner AC
- 2013–2017: Austria Wien
- 2017–2023: Admira Wacker

Senior career*
Years	Team	Apps	(Gls)
2022	Admira Wacker II	2	(1)
2022–2024	Admira Wacker	30	(2)
2024–2026	Juventus Next Gen	51	(10)
2026–	Genoa	2	(0)

International career^{‡}
2022–2023	Austria U18	4	(0)
2023–2024	Austria U19	5	(0)
2025–	Austria U21	11	(3)
- * Club domestic league appearances and goals as of 10 October 2026 ‡ National team caps and goals as of 6 October 2026

David Puczka (born 25 January 2005) is an Austrian professional footballer who plays as a defender, midfielder, or winger for Serie A club Genoa.

== Early life ==
Puczka was born on 25 January 2005 in Austria. Growing up, he regarded Brazil international Marcelo as his football idol.

== Club career ==
As a youth player, Puczka joined the youth academy of Austrian side Favoritner AC. Following his stint there, he joined the youth academy of Austrian side Austria Wien in 2013.

Four years later, he joined the youth academy of Austrian side Admira Wacker and was promoted to the club's senior team in 2022, where he made thirty league appearances and scored two goals. Ahead of the 2024–25 season, he signed for Italian side Juventus Next Gen.

On 2 July 2026, he moved to Serie A club Genoa, on a permanent transfer ahead of the 2026–27 season.

== International career ==
Puczka is an Austria youth international. During the autumn of 2023 and the spring of 2024, he played for the Austria national under-19 football team for 2024 UEFA European Under-19 Championship qualification.

== Style of play ==
Puczka plays as a defender, or winger. Italian newspaper Sprint e Sport wrote in 2026 that "he's the classic player who starts wide and ends up narrowing his range of action based on the needs of the play: he can carry the ball towards the byline, but he also knows how to attack the area from inside-out".

== Career statistics ==
As of match played 10 October 2026

Appearances and goals by club, season and competition
Club	Season	League			Cup		Europe		Other		Total	
Club	Season	Division	Apps	Goals	Apps	Goals	Apps	Goals	Apps	Goals	Apps	Goals
Admira Wacker II	2021–22	Austrian Regionalliga East	2	1	—		—		—		2	1
Admira Wacker	2022–23	2. Liga	4	0	—		—		—		4	0
Admira Wacker	2023–24	2. Liga	26	2	2	1	—		—		28	3
Admira Wacker	Total		30	2	2	1	—		—		32	3
Juventus Next Gen	2024–25	Serie C	20	0	—		—		—		20	0
Juventus Next Gen	2025–26	Serie C	31	10	—		—		3 (Note: Two appearances in Coppa Italia Serie C, one appearance in Playoff Serie C)	0	34	10
Juventus Next Gen	Total		51	10	—		—		3	0	54	10
Genoa	2026–27	Serie A	2	0	2	0	—		—		4	0
Career total			85	13	4	1	0	0	3	0	92	14
