= Patrizio Masini =

Italian footballer (born 2001)

Personal information
- Date of birth: 27 January 2001 (age 25)
- Place of birth: La Spezia, Italy
- Height: 1.82 m (6 ft 0 in)
- Position: Midfielder

Team information
- Current team: Frosinone (on loan from Genoa)
- Number: 73

Youth career
- ARCI Pianazze
- 2012–2020: Genoa

Senior career*
| Years | Team | Apps | (Gls) |
| 2020– | Genoa | 54 | (1) |
| 2020–2021 | → Sambenedettese (loan) | 14 | (2) |
| 2021–2022 | → Lecco (loan) | 53 | (5) |
| 2022–2023 | → Novara (loan) | 25 | (3) |
| 2023–2024 | → Ascoli (loan) | 25 | (2) |
| 2026– | → Frosinone (loan) | 9 | (0) |
- * Club domestic league appearances and goals as of 09:20, 18 November 2026 (UTC)

Patrizio Masini (born 27 January 2001) is an Italian professional footballer who plays as a midfielder for Serie A club Frosinone, on loan from Genoa.

== Club career ==
Born in La Spezia, Masini started his career on Genoa youth system. He was loaned to Serie C club Sambenedettese for the 2020–21 season, and made his professional debut on 27 September 2020 against Carpi.

On 29 January 2021, he was loaned to Lecco for the rest of the season. He renewed his loan for the next season.

After appearing two times on Genoa's bench early in the 2022–23 season, on 1 September 2022 Masini was loaned by Novara.

On 6 July 2023, he joined Serie B club Ascoli on loan.

On 10 August 2026, Masini moved to Frosinone, recently promoted to Serie A, on loan with a conditional obligation to buy.

== Career statistics ==
As of match played 1 November 2026

Club statistics
| Club | Season | League | | | National Cup | | Continental | | Other | | Total | |
| Club | Season | Division | Apps | Goals | Apps | Goals | Apps | Goals | Apps | Goals | Apps | Goals |
|---|---|---|---|---|---|---|---|---|---|---|---|---|
| Sambenedettese (loan) | 2020–21 | Serie C | 14 | 2 | 1 | 0 | — | | — | | 15 | 2 |
| Lecco (loan) | 2020–21 | Serie C | 16 | 1 | 0 | 0 | — | | 1 (Note: Appearance in the 2020–21 Serie C Promotion play-offs) | 0 | 17 | 1 |
| Lecco (loan) | 2021–22 | Serie C | 37 | 4 | 0 | 0 | — | | 2 (Note: One appearance each in the Coppa Italia Serie C and 2021–22 Serie C Promotion play-offs) | 0 | 39 | 4 |
| Lecco (loan) | Total | | 53 | 5 | 0 | 0 | 0 | 0 | 3 | 0 | 56 | 5 |
| Novara (loan) | 2022–23 | Serie C | 25 | 3 | 0 | 0 | — | | — | | 25 | 3 |
| Ascoli (loan) | 2023–24 | Serie C | 25 | 2 | 1 | 0 | — | | — | | 26 | 2 |
| Genoa | 2024–25 | Serie A | 26 | 1 | 0 | 0 | — | | — | | 26 | 1 |
| Genoa | 2025–26 | Serie A | 28 | 0 | 3 | 0 | — | | — | | 31 | 0 |
| Genoa | Total | | 54 | 1 | 3 | 0 | 0 | 0 | 0 | 0 | 57 | 1 |
| Frosinone (loan) | 2026–27 | Serie A | 9 | 0 | 2 | 0 | — | | — | | 11 | 0 |
| Career totals | | | 180 | 13 | 7 | 0 | 0 | 0 | 3 | 0 | 190 | 13 |
