= Adam Žulevič =

Slovak footballer (born 2007)

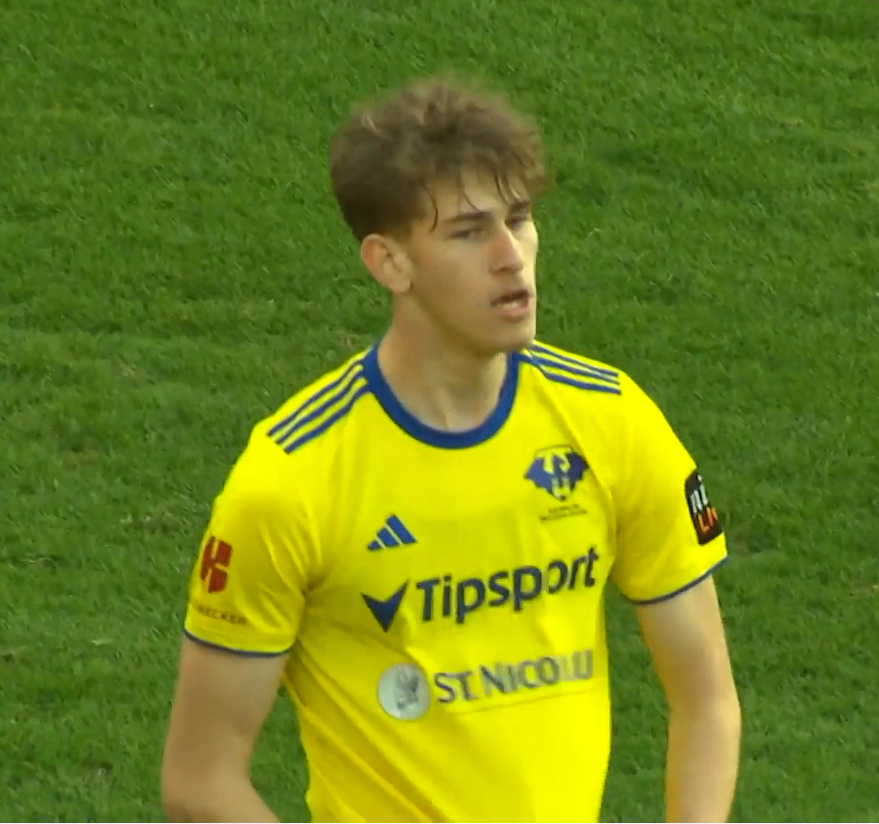
- Žulevič after scoring his debut goal against AS Trenčín

Personal information
- Full name: Adam Žulevič
- Date of birth: 14 September 2007 (age 19)
- Place of birth: Medzilaborce, Slovakia
- Height: 6 ft 6 in (1.98 m)
- Positions: Forward; winger

Team information
- Current team: Iraklis (on loan from Genoa)
- Number: 97

Youth career
- MFK Zemplín Michalovce
- 2025–: Genoa

Senior career*
Years	Team	Apps	(Gls)
2024–2025	MFK Zemplín Michalovce	15	(4)
2026–	Genoa	1	(0)
2026–	→ Iraklis (loan)	0	(0)

International career^{‡}
2024	Slovakia U18	4	(1)
2025–	Slovakia U19	10	(1)
- * Club domestic league appearances and goals as of 22 August 2026 ‡ National team caps and goals as of 27 May 2026

Adam Žulevič (born 14 September 2007) is a Slovak professional footballer who plays as a forward and winger for Super League Greece club Iraklis, on loan from Serie A club Genoa.

== Club career ==
=== Zemplín Michalovce ===
Žulevič is a product of Zemplín academy. He had been within the academy since the summer of 2021. In the 2023/24 season, he became the top scorer in the U17 first league.

Žulevič made his professional debut for the club on 6 October 2024, coming onto the pitch as a substitute for Abdul Zubairu in the 85th minute in a 1–0 loss to Banská Bystrica. He scored his first career goal in a 3–2 loss to AS Trenčín, coming on as a substitute in the 46th minute. After the game, Žulevič became the second youngest player to ever score for Zemplín, coming before Dávid Petrik.

=== Genoa ===
On 1 August 2025, it was announced that Žulevič would be joining Italian Serie A club Genoa. He made his debut for the club in a 2–1 win over Lazio.

==== Loan to Iraklis ====
On 16 September 2026, Žulevič signed for Super League Greece club Iraklis on a year loan deal.

== International career ==
=== Youth ===
After impressive performances for Zemplin, Žulevič was called up to the Slovakia U-18 team on 22 May 2025. He scored his first international goal in a 2:1 win over Romania U-18.

== Career statistics ==
=== Club ===
Team	Season	League	League		Other	
Team	Season	League	Apps	Gls	Apps	Gls
Zemplín Michalovce	2024–25	Slovak First League	15	4	2	0
Zemplín Michalovce	2025-26	Slovak First League	1	0	—	
Genoa	2025-26	Italian youth league	2	0	—	
