= 2024–25 Genoa CFC season =

Genoa
2024–25 season
- President: Alberto Zangrillo (until 17 December); Dan Șucu (from 18 December)
- Head coach: Alberto Gilardino (until 19 November); Patrick Vieira (from 20 November)
- Stadium: Stadio Luigi Ferraris
- Serie A: 13th
- Coppa Italia: Second round
- Top goalscorer: League: Andrea Pinamonti (10); All: Andrea Pinamonti (11)
- Highest home attendance: 33,435 vs Napoli; 21 December 2024, Serie A
- Lowest home attendance: 21,070 vs Cagliari; 24 November 2024, Serie A
- Average home league attendance: 29,898
- Biggest win: 2–0 vs Udinese (A); 1 December 2024, Serie A 2–0 vs Monza (H); 27 January 2025, Serie A 2–0 vs Venezia (H); 17 February 2025, Serie A 3–1 vs Bologna (A); 24 May 2025, Serie A
- Biggest defeat: 1–5 vs Atalanta (A); 5 October 2024, Serie A
Home colours	Away colours	Third colours

The 2024–25 season was the 132nd season in the history of Genoa CFC, and the club's second consecutive season in Serie A. In addition to the domestic league, the club also participated in the Coppa Italia.

== Players ==
=== First-team squad ===
As of 4 February 2025

Note: Flags indicate national team as defined under FIFA eligibility rules; some limited exceptions apply. Players may hold more than one non-FIFA nationality.

No.	Pos.	Nation	Player
1	GK	ITA	Nicola Leali
2	MF	NOR	Morten Thorsby
3	DF	ESP	Aarón Martín
4	DF	BEL	Koni De Winter
5	MF	CMR	Jean Onana (on loan from Beşiktaş)
9	FW	POR	Vitinha
10	MF	BRA	Junior Messias
13	DF	ITA	Mattia Bani (vice-captain)
15	DF	ENG	Brooke Norton-Cuffy
17	MF	UKR	Ruslan Malinovskyi
18	FW	GHA	Caleb Ekuban
19	FW	ITA	Andrea Pinamonti (on loan from Sassuolo)
20	DF	ITA	Stefano Sabelli
21	FW	ITA	Jeff Ekhator
22	DF	MEX	Johan Vásquez

No.	Pos.	Nation	Player
23	MF	ITA	Fabio Miretti (on loan from Juventus)
30	FW	PAR	Hugo Cuenca
31	GK	SUI	Benjamin Siegrist (on loan from Rapid Bucharest)
32	MF	DEN	Morten Frendrup
33	DF	URU	Alan Matturro
34	DF	DEN	Sebastian Otoa
39	GK	ITA	Daniele Sommariva
45	FW	ITA	Mario Balotelli
47	MF	CRO	Milan Badelj (captain)
53	MF	ISR	Lior Kassa (on loan from Maccabi Haifa)
59	DF	ITA	Alessandro Zanoli (on loan from Napoli)
69	DF	ITA	Honest Ahanor
70	FW	CIV	Maxwel Cornet (on loan from West Ham United)
73	MF	ITA	Patrizio Masini

== Transfers ==
=== Summer window ===
==== In ====
Date	Pos.	Player	From	Fee	Notes	Ref.
30 June 2024	FW	(Italy) Federico Accornero	(Italy) Pescara	End of loan		
30 June 2024	DF	(Italy) Alessandro Marcandalli	(Italy) Reggiana	End of loan		
30 June 2024	MF	(Italy) Patrizio Masini	(Italy) Ascoli	End of loan		
30 June 2024	MF	(Italy) Filippo Melegoni	(Italy) Reggiana	End of loan		
1 July 2024	DF	(Belgium) Koni De Winter	(Italy) Juventus	€8,000,000	Loan transfer made permanent	
1 July 2024	MF	(Norway) Emil Bohinen	(Italy) Salernitana	€2,000,000	Loan transfer made permanent	
1 July 2024	MF	(Norway) Morten Thorsby	(Germany) Union Berlin	€4,000,000	Loan transfer made permanent	
1 July 2024	FW	(Portugal) Vitinha	(France) Marseille	€16,000,000	Loan transfer made permanent	
14 August 2024	DF	(England) Brooke Norton-Cuffy	(England) Arsenal	€2,000,000		
14 October 2024	MF	(Uruguay) Gastón Pereiro	Unattached	Free		
28 October 2024	FW	(Italy) Mario Balotelli	Unattached	Free		

==== Loans in ====
Date	Pos.	Player	From	Fee	Notes	Ref.
11 July 2024	DF	(Italy) Alessandro Zanoli	(Italy) Napoli	Free	Option to buy for €7,000,000 obligation to buy under certain conditions	
30 July 2024	GK	(Italy) Pierluigi Gollini	(Italy) Atalanta	Free	Option to buy for €3,000,000	
16 August 2024	FW	(Italy) Andrea Pinamonti	(Italy) Sassuolo	€2,000,000	Option to buy for €14,000,000	
25 August 2024	MF	(Italy) Fabio Miretti	(Italy) Juventus	Free	Option to buy for an undisclosed fee	
25 August 2024	MF	(Israel) Lior Kasa	(Israel) Maccabi Haifa	€250,000	Option to buy for €2,500,000	

==== Out ====
Date	Pos.	Player	To	Fee	Notes	Ref.
30 June 2024	MF	(Netherlands) Kevin Strootman	Retired			
30 June 2024	DF	(Italy) Giorgio Cittadini	(Italy) Atalanta	End of loan		
30 June 2024	DF	(Suriname) Ridgeciano Haps	(Italy) Venezia	End of loan		
30 June 2024	MF	(England) Djed Spence	(England) Tottenham Hotspur	End of loan		
1 July 2024	FW	(Poland) Aleksander Buksa	(Poland) Górnik Zabrze	Undisclosed		
1 July 2024	MF	(Italy) Francesco Cassata	(Italy) Spezia	€590,000	Loan transfer made permanent	
9 July 2024	GK	(Spain) Josep Martínez	(Italy) Inter Milan	€13,500,000		
12 July 2024	FW	(Italy) Massimo Coda	(Italy) Sampdoria	€500,000		
17 July 2024	DF	(Albania) Brayan Boci	(Italy) Feralpisalò	Undisclosed		
27 July 2024	FW	(Italy) Kelvin Yeboah	(United States) Minnesota United	€3,000,000		
4 August 2024	DF	(Switzerland) Silvan Hefti	(Germany) Hamburger SV	€1,20,000		
8 August 2024	FW	(Italy) Mateo Retegui	(Italy) Atalanta	€20,900,000		
13 August 2024	MF	(Poland) Filip Jagiełło	(Poland) Lech Poznań	Free		
14 August 2024	FW	(Romania) George Pușcaș	(Turkey) Bodrumspor	Undisclosed		
30 August 2024	MF	(Italy) Luca Chierico	(Italy) Arezzo	Free		
30 August 2024	DF	(Italy) Paolo Gozzi	(France) Troyes	Undisclosed		
3 September 2024	DF	(Croatia) Marko Pajač	(Croatia) Lokomotiva Zagreb	Free	Contract solved by mutual consent	

==== Loans out ====
Date	Pos.	Player	To	Fee	Notes	Ref.
8 July 2024	GK	(Italy) Simone Calvani	(Italy) Pontedera	Free		
19 July 2024	DF	(Germany) Lennart Czyborra	(Austria) WSG Tirol	Free		
25 July 2024	MF	(Italy) Mattia Aramu	(Italy) Mantova	Free	Option to buy for an undisclosed fee	
8 August 2024	MF	(Italy) Manolo Portanova	(Italy) Reggiana	Free	Obligation to buy for an undisclosed fee	
9 August 2024	DF	(Italy) Gabriele Calvani	(Italy) Brescia	Free	Until 2025–26 season, option to buy for an undisclosed fee with a buy-back option	
12 August 2024	FW	(Italy) Elia Petrelli	(Italy) Forlì	Free		
16 August 2024	MF	(Iceland) Albert Guðmundsson	(Italy) Fiorentina	€5,850,000	Option to buy for €17,000,000	
22 August 2024	FW	(Italy) Seydou Fini	(Netherlands) Excelsior	Free		
22 August 2024	MF	(Greece) Christos Papadopoulos	(Italy) Juventus Next Gen	Free	Option to buy for €2,500,000	
22 August 2024	DF	(Italy) Federico Valietti	(Italy) Trapani	Free	Obligation to buy for an undisclosed fee	
30 August 2024	FW	(Italy) Andrea Favilli	(Italy) Bari	Free	Obligation to buy for an undisclosed fee	
30 August 2024	FW	(Italy) Daniel Fossati	(Italy) Gubbio	Free		
1 September 2024	FW	(Turkey) Güven Yalçın	(Portugal) Arouca	Free	Option to buy for an undisclosed fee	

=== Winter window ===
==== In ====
Date	Pos.	Player	From	Fee	Notes	Ref.
8 January 2025	DF	(Italy) Tommaso Pittino	(Italy) Sestri Levante	Free	Loan terminated early	
16 January 2025	DF	(Denmark) Sebastian Otoa	(Denmark) Aalborg	€2,750,000		
21 January 2025	DF	(Italy) Lorenzo Gagliardi	(Italy) Pontedera	Free	Loan terminated early	
30 January 2025	MF	(Iceland) Mikael Egill Ellertsson	(Italy) Venezia	€3,500,000		
31 January 2025	FW	(Italy) Daniel Fossati	(Italy) Gubbio	Free	Loan terminated early	
3 February 2025	MF	(Paraguay) Hugo Cuenca	(Italy) Milan Futuro	Free		

==== Loans in ====
Date	Pos.	Player	From	Fee	Notes	Ref.
20 January 2025	FW	(Ivory Coast) Maxwel Cornet	(England) West Ham United	Free	Option to buy for an undisclosed fee	
28 January 2025	GK	(Switzerland) Benjamin Siegrist	(Romania) Rapid București	Free	Option to buy for an undisclosed fee	
30 January 2025	MF	(Cameroon) Jean Onana	(Turkey) Beşiktaş	Free	Option to buy for €1,200,000	

==== Out ====
Date	Pos.	Player	To	Fee	Notes	Ref.
23 January 2025	GK	(Italy) Pierluigi Gollini	(Italy) Atalanta	Free	Loan terminated early	
24 January 2025	MF	(Italy) Filippo Melegoni	(Italy) Carrarese	Undisclosed		
1 February 2024	MF	(Uruguay) Gastón Pereiro	(Italy) Bari	Undisclosed		

==== Loans out ====
Date	Pos.	Player	To	Fee	Notes	Ref.
9 January 2025	DF	(Italy) Tommaso Pittino	(Italy) Lumezzane	Free		
15 January 2025	DF	(Italy) Alessandro Vogliacco	(Italy) Parma	Free	Option to buy for an undisclosed fee	
17 January 2025	FW	(Italy) Federico Accornero	(Italy) Trento	Free		
20 January 2025	FW	(Nigeria) David Ankeye	(Romania) Rapid București	Free		
22 January 2025	DF	(Italy) Lorenzo Gagliardi	(Italy) Novara	Free		
29 January 2025	DF	(Italy) Alessandro Marcandalli	(Italy) Venezia	Free		
29 January 2025	GK	(Austria) Franz Stolz	(Romania) Rapid București	Free	Option to buy for an undisclosed fee	
31 January 2025	MF	(Iceland) Mikael Egill Ellertsson	(Italy) Venezia	Free		
1 February 2025	FW	(Italy) Daniel Fossati	(Italy) Carpi	Free		
3 February 2025	MF	(Norway) Emil Bohinen	(Italy) Frosinone	Free		

== Friendlies ==
=== Pre-season ===
14 July 2024 Friendly	ASD Fassa Calcio (Italy)	1–17	(Italy) Genoa

20 July 2024 Friendly	Venezia (Italy)	1–3	(Italy) Genoa
17:00

25 July 2024 Friendly	Genoa (Italy)	3–2	(Italy) Mantova
17:00

1 August 2024 Friendly	Brescia (Italy)	2–0	(Italy) Genoa	Brescia
18:30				Stadium: Stadio Mario Rigamonti

4 August 2024 Friendly	Monaco (France)	1–2	(Italy) Genoa
11:00

== Competitions ==
=== Overall record ===
Competition	First match	Last match	Starting round	Final position	Record							
Competition	First match	Last match	Starting round	Final position	Pld	W	D	L	GF	GA	GD	Win %
Serie A	17 August 2024	24 May 2025	Matchday 1	13th	38	10	13	15	37	49	−12	26.32
Coppa Italia	9 August 2024	25 September 2024	First round	Second round	2	1	1	0	2	1	+1	50.00
Total					40	11	14	15	39	50	−11	27.50

Source: Soccerway

=== Serie A ===
==== League table ====
Pos	Team	Pld	W	D	L	GF	GA	GD	Pts
11	Torino	38	10	14	14	39	45	−6	44 (Note: Torino finished ahead of Udinese on head-to-head points: Udinese 2–2 Torino, Torino 2–0 Udinese.)
12	Udinese	38	12	8	18	41	56	−15	44
13	Genoa	38	10	13	15	37	49	−12	43
14	Hellas Verona	38	10	7	21	34	66	−32	37
15	Cagliari	38	9	9	20	40	56	−16	36 (Note: Cagliari finished ahead of Parma on head-to-head points: Parma 2–3 Cagliari, Cagliari 2–1 Parma.)

Source: Serie A
Rules for classification: 1) Points; 2) Tiebreaker for Champions team and third relegated team; 3) Head-to-head points; 4) Head-to-head goal difference; 5) Goal difference; 6) Goals scored; 7) Draw.
(Note: Head-to-head record is used only after all the matches between the teams in question have been played)

==== Results summary ====
Overall								Home						Away					
Pld	W	D	L	GF	GA	GD	Pts	W	D	L	GF	GA	GD	W	D	L	GF	GA	GD
38	10	13	15	37	49	−12	43	5	7	7	21	25	−4	5	6	8	16	24	−8

Source: WorldFootball.net

==== Results by round ====
Round	1	2	3	4	5	6	7	8	9	10	11	12	13	14	15	16	17	18	19	20	21	22	23	24	25	26	27	28	29	30	31	32	33	34	35	36	37	38
Ground	H	A	H	H	A	H	A	H	A	H	A	H	H	A	H	A	H	A	A	H	A	H	A	A	H	A	H	A	H	A	H	A	H	A	H	A	H	A
Result	D	W	L	D	L	L	L	D	L	L	W	D	D	W	D	D	L	W	D	W	L	W	L	D	W	L	D	D	W	L	W	D	L	L	L	D	L	W
Position	8	4	10	11	16	16	18	18	18	20	17	17	17	14	14	13	13	12	12	11	12	10	12	12	11	12	12	12	12	12	12	12	13	13	13	13	13	13

Source: WorldFootball.net
A = Away; H = Home; W = Win; D = Draw; L = Loss

==== Matches ====
The match schedule was released on 4 July 2024.

17 August 2024 1	Genoa	2–2	Internazionale	Genoa
18:30 CEST (UTC+2)	Vogliacco 20'; Gollini (yellow card) 63'; Messias (penalty missed) 90+5', 90+5'	Report	Mkhitaryan (yellow card) 16'; Thuram 30', 84'; Asllani (yellow card) 90+9'	Stadium: Stadio Luigi Ferraris; Attendance: 33,300; Referee: Ermanno Feliciani

24 August 2024 2	Monza	0–1	Genoa	Monza
20:45	Izzo (yellow card) 39'; Marí (yellow card) 90+6'	Report	Pinamonti 45+7'; De Winter (yellow card) 59'; Thorsby (yellow card) 90+1'; Malinovskyi (yellow card) 90+3'	Stadium: Stadio Brianteo; Attendance: 10,394; Referee: Maurizio Mariani

1 September 2024 3	Genoa	0–2	Hellas Verona	Genoa
18:30 CEST (UTC+2)	Frendrup (yellow card) 40'; De Winter (yellow card) 49'	Report	Suslov (yellow card) 20'; Dawidowicz (yellow card) 32'; Harroui (yellow card) 45+2'; Tchatchoua 55'; Tengstedt 64' (pen.), (yellow card) 65'; Belahyane (yellow card) 77'; Duda (yellow card) 79'	Stadium: Stadio Luigi Ferraris; Attendance: 30,747; Referee: Giovanni Ayroldi

15 September 2024 4	Genoa	1–1	Roma	Genoa
12:30 CEST (UTC+2)	De Winter (yellow card) 70', (goal) 90+6'	Report	Dovbyk 37'; Pisilli (yellow card) 45'; Pellegrini (yellow card) 65'; Shomurodov (yellow card) 90+1'	Stadium: Stadio Luigi Ferraris; Attendance: 33,009; Referee: Antonio Giua

21 September 2024 5	Venezia	2–0	Genoa	Venice
15:00 CEST (UTC+2)	Busio 63'; Svoboda (yellow card) 71'; Pohjanpalo 85'; Yeboah (yellow card) 88'	Report	De Winter (yellow card) 30'; Bani (yellow card) 57'; Pinamonti (yellow card) 62'	Stadium: Stadio Pier Luigi Penzo; Attendance: 10,502; Referee: Matteo Marchetti

28 September 2024 6	Genoa	0–3	Juventus	Genoa
18:00 CEST (UTC+2)	Frendrup (yellow card) 27'; Vásquez (yellow card) 76'	Report	Vlahović 48' (pen.), 55'; Fagioli (yellow card) 50'; Conceição 89'	Stadium: Stadio Luigi Ferraris; Attendance: 0 (Note: The match was played behind closed doors as punishment for violent clashes during Genoa's second round Coppa Italia match against Sampdoria on 25 September 2024.); Referee: Andrea Colombo

5 October 2024 7	Atalanta	5–1	Genoa	Bergamo
18:00 CEST (UTC+2)	Retegui 24', 50', 74' (pen.); Éderson 60'; De Roon 80'	Report	Ekhator 83'	Stadium: Stadio Atleti Azzurri d'Italia; Attendance: 23,138; Referee: Daniele Chiffi

19 October 2024 8	Genoa	2–2	Bologna	Genoa
15:00 CEST (UTC+2)	Martín (yellow card) 64'; Pinamonti 73', 85', (yellow card) 86'	Report	Orsolini 37'; Odgaard 56'	Stadium: Stadio Luigi Ferraris; Attendance: 30,952; Referee: Daniele Doveri

27 October 2024 9	Lazio	3–0	Genoa	Rome
15:00 CEST (UTC+2)	Noslin 21', (yellow card) 29'; Gila (yellow card) 55'; Marušić (yellow card) 67'; Pedro 86'; Vecino 90+4'	Report	Sabelli (yellow card) 23'	Stadium: Stadio Olimpico; Attendance: 43,000; Referee: Marco Piccinini

31 October 2024 10	Genoa	0–1	Fiorentina	Genoa
18:30 CET (UTC+1)	Pinamonti (yellow card) 2'; Vogliacco (yellow card) 77'; Vásquez (yellow card) 90+2'; Matturro (yellow card) 90+3'	Report	Richardson (yellow card) 6'; Martínez Quarta (yellow card) 11'; Gosens 72'	Stadium: Stadio Luigi Ferraris; Attendance: 30,254; Referee: Daniele Chiffi

4 November 2024 11	Parma	0–1	Genoa	Parma
18:30 CET (UTC+1)	Keita (yellow card) 36'; Haj (yellow card) 41'	Report	Leali (yellow card) 27'; Zanoli (yellow card) 54'; Ekhator (yellow card) 60'; Pinamonti 79'; Vásquez (yellow card) 82'; Bani (yellow card) 90+2'	Stadium: Stadio Ennio Tardini; Attendance: 16,151; Referee: Marco Guida

7 November 2024 12	Genoa	1–1	Como	Genoa
20:45 CET (UTC+1)	Martín (yellow card) 32'; Vogliacco (yellow card) 61', (goal) 90+2'; Balotelli (yellow card) 79'; Vásquez (yellow card) 86'	Report	Da Cunha 17'; Goldaniga (yellow card) 61'; Moreno (yellow card) 73'; Kempf (yellow card) 79'	Stadium: Stadio Luigi Ferraris; Attendance: 30,708; Referee: Antonio Rapuano

24 November 2024 13	Genoa	2–2	Cagliari	Genoa
12:30 CET (UTC+1)	Frendrup 12'; Miretti 59'; Martín (yellow card) 79'; Bani (yellow card) 86'	Report	Marin 8', (yellow card) 66'; Piccoli 88'; Viola (yellow card) 90+4'	Stadium: Stadio Luigi Ferraris; Attendance: 21,070; Referee: Simone Sozza

1 December 2024 14	Udinese	0–2	Genoa	Udine
12:30 CET (UTC+1)	Touré (red card) 4'; Kristensen (yellow card) 87'; Ebosse (yellow card) 90+2'	Report	Pinamonti 13'; Vásquez (yellow card) 42'; Badelj (yellow card) 45+3'; Giannetti 67' (o.g.); Martín (yellow card) 84'	Stadium: Stadio Friuli; Attendance: 21,995; Referee: Gianluca Aureliano

7 December 2024 15	Genoa	0–0	Torino	Genoa
15:00 CET (UTC+1)	Thorsby (yellow card) 45'; Masini (yellow card) 90+2'	Report	Tameze (yellow card) 90+4'	Stadium: Stadio Luigi Ferraris; Attendance: 32,363; Referee: Livio Marinelli

15 December 2024 16	Milan	0–0	Genoa	Milan
20:45 CET (UTC+1)		Report	Vogliacco (yellow card) 22'; Zanoli (yellow card) 42'	Stadium: San Siro; Attendance: 70,078; Referee: Marco Guida

21 December 2024 17	Genoa	1–2	Napoli	Genoa
18:00	Pinamonti 51'; Sabelli (yellow card) 62'; Frendrup (yellow card) 84'	Report	Zambo Anguissa 15'; Rrahmani 23'; Juan Jesus (yellow card) 32'	Stadium: Stadio Luigi Ferraris; Attendance: 33,435; Referee: Federico La Penna

28 December 2024 18	Empoli	1–2	Genoa	Empoli
15:00	Esposito (penalty missed) 54', 74'; Gyasi (yellow card) 81'	Report	Badelj 46'; Thorsby (yellow card) 66'; Ekuban 68'; Vitinha (yellow card) 79'	Stadium: Carlo Castellani; Attendance: 12,657; Referee: Antonio Rapuano

5 January 2025 19	Lecce	0–0	Genoa	Lecce

12 January 2025 20	Genoa	1–0	Parma	Genoa

17 January 2025 21	Roma	3–1	Genoa	Rome

27 January 2025 22	Genoa	2–0	Monza	Genoa

2 February 2025 23	Fiorentina	2–1	Genoa	Florence

8 February 2025 24	Torino	1–1	Genoa	Turin

17 February 2025 25	Genoa	2–0	Venezia	Genoa

22 February 2025 26	Internazionale	1–0	Genoa	Milan

2 March 2025 27	Genoa	1–1	Empoli	Genoa

7 March 2025 28	Cagliari	1–1	Genoa	Cagliari

14 March 2025 29	Genoa	2–1	Lecce	Genoa

29 March 2025 30	Juventus	1–0	Genoa	Turin

4 April 2025 31	Genoa	1–0	Udinese	Genoa

13 April 2025 32	Hellas Verona	0–0	Genoa	Verona

23 April 2025 33	Genoa	0–2	Lazio	Genoa

27 April 2025 34	Como	1–0	Genoa	Como

5 May 2025 35	Genoa	1–2	Milan	Genoa

11 May 2025 36	Napoli	2–2	Genoa	Naples

17 May 2025 37	Genoa	2–3	Atalanta	Genoa

24 May 2025 38	Bologna	1–3	Genoa	Bologna

=== Coppa Italia ===
9 August 2024 First round	Genoa	1–0	Reggiana	Genoa
20:45 CEST (UTC+2)	Badelj (yellow card) 10'; Messias 65'; De Winter (yellow card) 88'	Report	Vergara (yellow card) 16'; Rozzio (yellow card) 48'; Meroni (yellow card) 52'	Stadium: Stadio Luigi Ferraris; Attendance: 25,000; Referee: Davide Di Marco

25 September 2024 Second round	Genoa	1–1 (5–6 p)	Sampdoria	Genoa
21:00 CEST (UTC+2)	Pinamonti 9'; Badelj (yellow card) 36'; Vitinha (yellow card) 48'; Bani (yellow card) 56'; Vásquez (yellow card) 70'	Report	La Gumina (yellow card) 33'; Ioannou (yellow card) 36'; Depaoli (yellow card) 42'; Vieira (yellow card) 64'; Benedetti (yellow card) 71'; Meulensteen (yellow card) 82'; Borini 83'; Romagnoli (red card) 90+2'	Stadium: Stadio Luigi Ferraris; Attendance: 28,575; Referee: Federico La Penna
	Penalties
	Miretti (penalty missed); Bani (penalty scored); Bohinen (penalty scored); Vásquez (penalty scored); Vogliacco (penalty scored); Frendrup (penalty scored); Zanoli (penalty missed)		(penalty scored) Borini; (penalty scored) Bereszyński; (penalty missed) Benedetti; (penalty scored) Depaoli; (penalty scored) Tutino; (penalty scored) Sekulov; (penalty scored) Barreca
