= Alin Kumer Čelik =

Slovenian professional footballer (born 2007)

Alin Kumer
Personal information
- Full name: Alin Kumer Čelik
- Date of birth: 22 February 2007 (age 19)
- Place of birth: Maribor, Slovenia
- Height: 1.94 m (6 ft 4 in)
- Position: Centre-back

Team information
- Current team: Rapid București (on loan from Genoa)
- Number: 42

Youth career
- –2023: Maribor
- 2023–2025: Mura
- 2025–2026: Genoa

Senior career*
Years	Team	Apps	(Gls)
2024–2025	Mura	7	(1)
2026–	Genoa	0	(0)
2026–	→ Rapid București (loan)	0	(0)

International career^{‡}
2022	Slovenia U15	2	(0)
2023	Slovenia U16	1	(0)
2023–2024	Slovenia U17	9	(1)
2025–2026	Slovenia U18	2	(1)
2025–	Slovenia U19	7	(1)
- * Club domestic league appearances and goals as of 16 July 2026 ‡ National team caps and goals as of 31 March 2026

Alin Kumer Čelik (born 22 February 2007) is a Slovenian professional footballer who plays as a centre-back for Liga I club Rapid București, on loan from Serie A club Genoa.

== Club career ==
=== Early career ===
Kumer developed as a youth player in the academy of NK Maribor before moving to NŠ Mura on 3 July 2023, where he signed his first professional contract until December 2025.

During the 2024–25 season, Kumer Čelik broke into NŠ Mura's first team, making his debut in the Slovenian PrvaLiga. On 10 November 2024, in a 4–2 away victory against NK Radomlje, he scored his first professional goal. At 17 years, 8 months, and 16 days, he became the fourth-youngest league goalscorer in NŠ Mura's history. He also featured in the Slovenian Cup, making his debut in a 9–0 victory over Veržej on 28 August 2024.

=== Genoa ===
On 26 June 2025, NŠ Mura and Serie A club Genoa reached an agreement for the transfer of Kumer Čelik. He was assigned to the club's Primavera Under-20 squad. On 22 December 2025, he scored his first goal in Italy against Inter Milan Primavera.

=== Rapid București ===
On 16 July 2026, he joined Liga I club Rapid București on a season-long loan with an option to buy.

== International career ==
Kumer Čelik has represented Slovenia at youth level, earning caps for the Under-16, Under-17, Under-18, and Under-19 national teams.

On 6 September 2025, during the Tournament of Nations amical cup, he scored the winning goal in the 83rd minute for Slovenia U19 in a 1–0 victory against Poland U19. On 21 May 2026, he scored for the Slovenia Under-18 side in a 1–1 friendly draw against Northern Macedonia Under-18 in Ptuj.

== Career statistics ==
As of 27 October 2026

Appearances and goals by club, season and competition
Club	Season	League			National cup (Note: Includes Slovenian Cup, Cupa României)		Europe		Other		Total	
Club	Season	Division	Apps	Goals	Apps	Goals	Apps	Goals	Apps	Goals	Apps	Goals
Mura	2024–25	Slovenian PrvaLiga	7	1	1	0	—		—		8	1
Genoa	2025–26	Serie A	0	0	—		—		—		0	0
Rapid București (loan)	2026–27	Liga I	0	0	1	0	—		—		1	0
Career total			7	1	2	0	—		—		9	1
