= Luca Ferro =

Italian footballer

Personal information
- Date of birth: 28 August 1978 (age 48)
- Place of birth: Savona, Italy
- Height: 1.93 m (6 ft 4 in)
- Position: Goalkeeper

Team information
- Current team: Genoa U19 (goalkeeper coach)

Senior career*
Years	Team	Apps	(Gls)
1997–2004	Genoa	19	(0)
1998–1999	→ Arezzo (loan)	6	(0)
2000–2001	→ Mestre (loan)	6	(0)
2004–2008	La Chaux-de-Fonds	85	(0)
2008–2011	Neuchâtel Xamax	46	(0)
2011	Yverdon-Sport		
2012	SR Delémont		

Managerial career
- 2014–2016: Neuchâtel Xamax (goalkeeper coach)
- 2018–2019: Neuchâtel Xamax (goalkeeper coach)
- 2019–2020: Sion (goalkeeper coach)
- 2020–2021: Neuchâtel Xamax (goalkeeper coach)
- 2022–: Genoa U19 (goalkeeper coach)
- 2022–2023: Genoa U19 (caretaker)
- * Club domestic league appearances and goals

Luca Ferro (born 28 August 1978) is an Italian football coach and a former goalkeeper. He is the goalkeepers coach with the Under-19 squad of Genoa.

He has played in Serie B and the Swiss Challenge League. He made his debut in the Swiss Super League on 23 April 2009 and kept a clean sheet for Neuchâtel Xamax in a goalless draw against Young Boys Bern at the Stade de Suisse in Bern.
