= Koni De Winter =

Belgian footballer (born 2002)

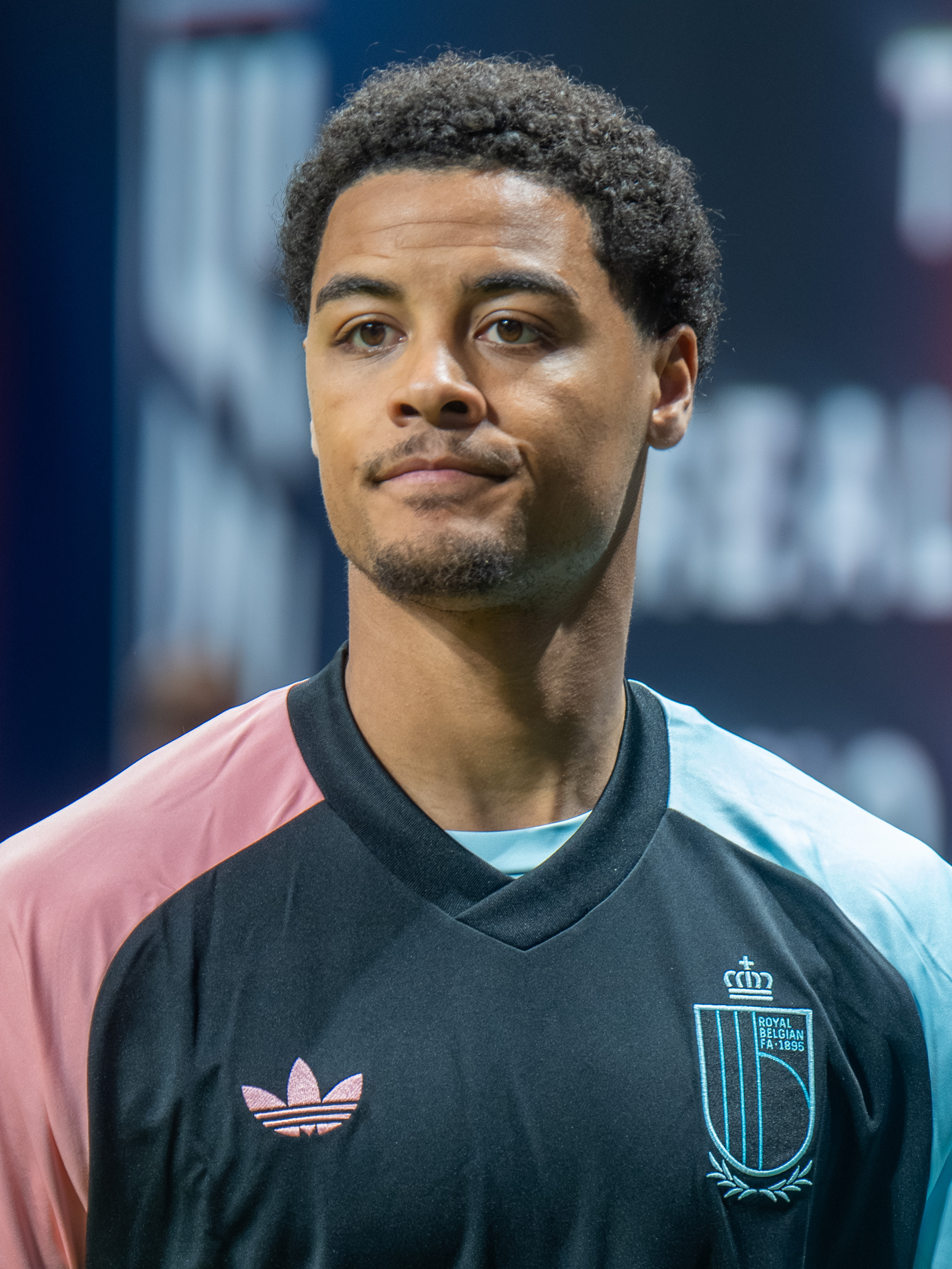
- De Winter with Belgium in 2026

Personal information
- Date of birth: 12 June 2002 (age 24)
- Place of birth: Antwerp, Belgium
- Height: 1.91 m (6 ft 3 in)
- Position: Centre-back

Team information
- Current team: AC Milan
- Number: 5

Youth career
- –2015: City Pirates Antwerp
- 2015–2016: Lierse SK
- 2016–2018: Zulte Waregem
- 2018–2021: Juventus

Senior career*
| Years | Team | Apps | (Gls) |
| 2021–2022 | Juventus U23 | 22 | (2) |
| 2021–2024 | Juventus | 0 | (0) |
| 2022–2023 | → Empoli (loan) | 14 | (0) |
| 2023–2024 | → Genoa (loan) | 29 | (0) |
| 2024–2025 | Genoa | 25 | (3) |
| 2025– | AC Milan | 38 | (1) |

International career^{‡}
| 2017 | Belgium U15 | 3 | (0) |
| 2017 | Belgium U16 | 2 | (1) |
| 2019 | Belgium U18 | 1 | (0) |
| 2019–2020 | Belgium U19 | 4 | (0) |
| 2021–2023 | Belgium U21 | 18 | (0) |
| 2024– | Belgium | 8 | (0) |
- * Club domestic league appearances and goals as of 22:14, 22 November 2026 (UTC) ‡ National team caps and goals as of 23:19, 2 June 2026 (UTC)

Koni De Winter (Dutch pronunciation: [ˈkoːni də ˈʋɪntər]; born 12 June 2002) is a Belgian professional footballer who plays as centre-back for Serie A club AC Milan and the Belgium national team.

== Club career ==
=== Early career ===
De Winter played in City Pirates Antwerp until 2015. He played the 2015–16 season in the Lierse SK youth academy. The following season, De Winter moved to the Zulte Waregem youth academy. In the summer of 2018, he moved to Serie A club Juventus, becoming the first Belgian footballer ever to play for them. Initially joining the youth academy, in the 2018–19 season, De Winter made 27 appearances and scored one goal with the under-17s. In the 2019–20 season, he made 8 appearances with the under-19s team. The following season, De Winter made 23 appearances with the under-19s often playing as captain.

=== Juventus ===
==== First call-up by Juventus and 2021–22 season ====
On 28 October 2020, De Winter was called up by Juventus' first team coach Andrea Pirlo for a UEFA Champions League match against La Liga club Barcelona. On 20 February 2021, he renewed his contract until 2024. On 24 July, he made his unofficial debut for Juventus in a 3–1 win against Cesena; scoring the opening goal in the 4th minute.

De Winter made his debut for Juventus U23 – the reserve team of Juventus – on 22 August 2021 in a 3–2 win against Pro Sesto in the Coppa Italia Serie C. On 20 October, he was sent off in a 2–2 draw against AlbinoLeffe, ten minutes after his entry onto the field. On 27 October, De Winter scored his first career goal: an equalizing goal in a 1–1 draw against Piacenza.

On 23 November, he made his official debut with the first team – as well as his debut in the Champions League – in a 4–0 defeat against Premier League club Chelsea, coming on as a substitute for Juan Cuadrado in the 81st minute. On 8 December, De Winter made his debut as a starter for the first team in a 1–0 win against Malmö FF, becoming the youngest Juventus player to debut as a starter at 19 years and 179 days; he was eventually substituted in the 70th minute for Mattia De Sciglio.

On 29 January 2022, he had a luxation of his left shoulder during a match against Feralpisalò. On 6 March, De Winter returned from his injury in a 1–0 win against Pro Sesto, coming on as a substitute in the 85th minute; four minutes later, he scored the winning goal. After the end of the season, on 9 July, the defender officially renewed his contract with the club until 2026.

==== Loan to Empoli ====
On 9 July 2022, the same day as his contract extension with Juventus was announced, De Winter was sent on loan to fellow Serie A side Empoli, with the deal being made official by both teams the following day.

==== Loan to Genoa ====
On 11 August 2023, he moved on loan to Genoa, with a conditional obligation to buy.

=== Genoa ===
On 1 July 2024, De Winter was permanently transferred to Genoa ahead of the 2024–25 season, as the club achieved the conditional buy obligation for an estimated €8 million transfer fee.

=== AC Milan ===
On 13 August 2025, De Winter joined fellow Serie A club AC Milan on a five-year contract. On 25 January 2026, he scored his first goal for the club in a 1–1 away draw with Roma.

== International career ==
On 23 March 2024, De Winter debuted for the Belgium national team in a friendly match against the Republic of Ireland.

On 15 May 2026, he was named in Belgium's squad for the 2026 FIFA World Cup. In November 2026, De Winter decided not to accept the selection for the Belgian squad for the 2026–27 UEFA Nations League, after not playing a single minute during the 2026 FIFA World Cup and the September-October international window while being selected.

== Positions of play ==
During his career, De Winter has played as a central defender, a full-back on both sides, a defensive midfielder, and as a mezzala (specialized midfielder in Italian football).

== Personal life ==
De Winter was born in Belgium to a Belgian father and a Congolese-French mother. De Winter holds both Congolese and French citizenship.

== Career statistics ==
=== Club ===
As of match played 22 November 2026

Appearances and goals by club, season and competition
| Club | Season | League | | | National cup (Note: Includes Coppa Italia Serie C, Coppa Italia) | | Europe | | Other | | Total | |
| Club | Season | Division | Apps | Goals | Apps | Goals | Apps | Goals | Apps | Goals | Apps | Goals |
|---|---|---|---|---|---|---|---|---|---|---|---|---|
| Juventus U23 | 2021–22 | Serie C | 22 | 2 | 6 | 0 | — | | 3 (Note: Appearances in Serie C promotion play-offs) | 0 | 31 | 2 |
| Juventus | 2021–22 | Serie A | 0 | 0 | 0 | 0 | 2 (Note: Appearances in UEFA Champions League) | 0 | 0 | 0 | 2 | 0 |
| Empoli (loan) | 2022–23 | Serie A | 14 | 0 | 0 | 0 | — | | — | | 14 | 0 |
| Genoa (loan) | 2023–24 | Serie A | 29 | 0 | 2 | 0 | — | | — | | 31 | 0 |
| Genoa | 2024–25 | Serie A | 25 | 3 | 1 | 0 | — | | — | | 26 | 3 |
| Genoa | Genoa total | | 54 | 3 | 3 | 0 | — | | — | | 57 | 3 |
| AC Milan | 2025–26 | Serie A | 26 | 1 | 2 | 0 | — | | 1 (Note: Appearance in Supercoppa Italiana) | 0 | 29 | 1 |
| AC Milan | 2026–27 | Serie A | 12 | 0 | 0 | 0 | 4 (Note: Appearances in UEFA Europa League) | 0 | — | | 16 | 0 |
| AC Milan | Total | | 38 | 1 | 2 | 0 | 4 | 0 | 1 | 0 | 45 | 1 |
| Career total | | | 128 | 6 | 11 | 0 | 6 | 0 | 4 | 0 | 149 | 6 |

=== International ===
As of match played 2 June 2026

Appearances and goals by national team and year
| National team | Year | Apps | Goals |
|---|---|---|---|
| Belgium | 2024 | 1 | 0 |
| Belgium | 2025 | 4 | 0 |
| Belgium | 2026 | 3 | 0 |
| Total | | 8 | 0 |

== Honours ==
Juventus

- Supercoppa Italiana runner-up: 2021
