= Joi Nuredini =

Albanian footballer (born 2007)

Personal information
- Full name: Joi Xheto Nuredini
- Date of birth: 5 August 2007 (age 19)
- Place of birth: Rome, Italy
- Height: 1.88 m (6 ft 2 in)
- Position: Forward

Team information
- Current team: Genoa
- Number: 19

Youth career
- 2023–: Genoa

Senior career*
Years	Team	Apps	(Gls)
2025–	Genoa	1	(0)

International career^{‡}
2022–2023	Albania U16	4	(1)
2023	Albania U17	4	(1)
2024–2025	Albania U19	13	(4)
- * Club domestic league appearances and goals as of 22 August 2026 ‡ National team caps and goals as of 12 October 2025

Xheto Joi Nuredini (born 5 August 2007) is a professional footballer who plays as a forward for Serie A club Genoa. Born in Italy, he is an Albanian youth international.

Developed through the Genoa youth system, he debuted for the first team in Serie A in January 2025 at the age of 17.

== Club career ==
=== Early career ===
Nuredini was born in Rome, Italy. Nuredini joined the Genoa youth setup and first came to prominence during the 2023–24 campaign, scoring 13 goals with the club's under-17 side.

He progressed to the Primavera squad the following season, where he made 30 appearances across league and cup competitions, recording 7 goals and 11 assists. In 2025, he signed his first professional contract with the club, running until 30 June 2026.

In November 2025, was reported that several clubs, including Juventus and Anderlecht, had scouted Nuredini following his performances for Genoa Primavera, where he had scored four goals in seven league matches.

Nuredini received his first senior call-ups during the 2025–26 season, and made his Serie A debut in January 2025, appearing for Genoa in a league match at age 17.

== International career ==
Nuredini has represented Albania at youth international levels, including U16, U17, and U19, appearing in both friendly matches and UEFA European Championship qualifiers, and scoring in some friendly games.

== Career statistics ==
=== Club ===
As of match played 18 January 2026

Appearances and goals by club, season and competition
Club	Season	League			National cup		League cup		Continental		Other		Total	
Club	Season	Division	Apps	Goals	Apps	Goals	Apps	Goals	Apps	Goals	Apps	Goals	Apps	Goals
Genoa	2025–26	Serie A	1	0	—		—		—		—		1	0
Career total			1	0	—		—		—		—		1	0
