= Gaël Lafont =

French footballer (born 2006)

Personal information
- Date of birth: 7 June 2006 (age 20)
- Place of birth: Aix-en-Provence, France
- Height: 1.75 m (5 ft 9 in)
- Position: Midfielder

Team information
- Current team: Genoa
- Number: 75

Youth career
- –2016: Burel FC
- 2016–2023: Marseille
- 2025–: Genoa

Senior career*
Years	Team	Apps	(Gls)
2023–2025	Marseille B	14	(1)
2024–2025	Marseille	0	(0)
2025–	Genoa	1	(0)

International career^{‡}
2021	France U16	5	(0)
2024	France U19	3	(0)
- * Club domestic league appearances and goals as of 24 May 2026 ‡ National team caps and goals as of 10 October 2024

Gaël Lafont (born 7 June 2006) is a French professional footballer who plays as a midfielder for Serie A club Genoa.

== Early life ==
Lafont was born on 7 June 2006 in Aix-en-Provence, France. A native of the city, he has two older sisters.

== Career ==
As a youth player, Lafont joined the academy of Burel FC. In 2016, he joined the academy of Ligue 1 side Marseille, where he played in the UEFA Youth League. Subsequently, he was promoted to the club's reserve team in 2023. On 18 April 2024, he debuted for the first team during a 1–0 home win on penalties over Benfica in the UEFA Europa League.

On 12 August 2025, Lafont signed for Italian club Genoa in Serie A. He was assigned to their Under-20 squad in Campionato Primavera 1.

== Style of play ==
Lafont plays as a midfielder and is left-footed. Speaking to French newspaper La Marseillaise in 2024, his OM teammate Sofiane Sidi Ali said that he "has a good quality of pass and he is intelligent in his movements".
