= Dávid Petrik =

Slovak footballer (born 2005)

Dávid Petrík
Personal information
- Full name: Dávid Petrík
- Date of birth: 14 June 2005 (20)
- Place of birth: Humenné, Slovakia
- Height: 1.75 m (5 ft 9 in)
- Position: Midfielder

Team information
- Current team: Michalovce
- Number: 19

Youth career
- –2022: Michalovce

Senior career*
Years	Team	Apps	(Gls)
2022–	Michalovce	22	(1)
2025	FK Humenné (loan)	5	(1)
2026–	Slávia TU Košice (loan)	9	(1)

International career
	Slovakia U17	10	(1)
2023	Slovakia U18	7	(2)
2024	Slovakia U19	2	(0)
- * Club domestic league appearances and goals as of 07:17, 25 April 2026 (UTC)

Dávid Petrik (born 14 June 2005) is a Slovak professional footballer who currently plays for Slávia TU Košice on loan from Slovak First Division side Zemplín Michalovce.

He is the all time youngest goal scorer for Zemplín, with the record set at the age of 17 years, 5 months, and 10 days.

== Club career ==
=== Zemplín Michalovce ===
Petrik is a product of Zemplín academy. He signed his first professional in 2022, signing until June 2025. He made his debut for the club on 8 April 2022, in a 3–1 loss against Liptovský Mikuláš. Petrik scored his first professional goal after coming on for Matúš Marcin in the 69th minute against Spartak Trnava in a 4–1 loss. The goal made Petrik the all time youngest goal scorer in Zemplín Michalovce history, with the record set at the age of 17 years, 5 months, and 10 days. In August 2024, he signed an extension to his contract with Michalovce, keeping him at the club until the end of the 2026/27 season.

==== Loan to Humenné ====
Petrik joined FK Humenné on 16 February 2025 on a 6 month loan. He scored his first goal from the club in a 1–1 draw against FC Petržalka in the league, scoring in the 67th minute of the game following 4 red cards. Despite good performances, Petrik would not be able to help his team survive in the 2. Liga.

=== Return and loan to Slávia TU Košice ===
After his loan to Humenné, Petrik returned to Zemplín Michalovce. He was a part of the squad ahead of the 2025–26 league season. However, due to an injury in a pre-season friendly, Petrik would miss out on the majority of the games in the regular season of the Slovak First Football League. He was a part of the Zemplín squad ahead of the winter preparations in Turkey.

On 18 February 2026, it was announced that Petrík would be returning to the second division, this time joining newly promoted side Slávia TU Košice on a 6-month loan. He debuted in a 1–0 loss against Dynamo Malženice, playing 60 minutes of the game. He scored in his next match, a 1–0 win over FC Petržalka, scoring the winning goal in the 40th minute.

== International career ==
On 15 March 2023, Petrik was nominated for the Slovakia U18. He scored a goal in a 5–1 win over North Macedonia U18, and the winning goal in a 1–0 win over United States U18. He also featured in 2 games for Slovakia U19, including a 1–1 draw against Northern Ireland U19.
