= Latif Ouedraogo =

Burkinabe footballer

Personal information
- Full name: Wedtoin Latif Ouedraogo
- Date of birth: October 23, 2007 (age 19)
- Place of birth: Ouagadougou, Burkina Faso
- Height: 1.75 m (5 ft 9 in)
- Position: Left-back

Team information
- Current team: Rapid București (on loan from Genoa)
- Number: 66

Youth career
- Académie Foot Plus
- –2025: Casarano
- 2026: Genoa

Senior career*
Years	Team	Apps	(Gls)
2025–2026	Virtus Francavilla	18	(0)
2026–	Genoa	2	(0)
2026–	→ Rapid București (loan)	10	(0)
- * Club domestic league appearances and goals as of 7 November 2026

Wedtoin Latif Ouedraogo (born 23 October 2007) is a Burkinabe professional footballer who plays as a left-back for Liga I club Rapid București, on loan from Serie A club Genoa.

== Club career ==
Born in Burkina Faso, Ouedraogo went through the youth academy of Casarano, before signing his first professional contract with Virtus Francavilla in Serie D 31 July 2025. On 24 January 2026, he transferred to Serie A club Genoa CFC. On 10 May 2026, he made his professional debut with Genoa as a substitute in a 0–0 Serie A draw against Fiorentina.

== Career statistics ==
As of 7 November 2026

Appearances and goals by club, season and competition
Club	Season	League			National cup (Note: Includes Cupa României)		Europe		Other		Total	
Club	Season	Division	Apps	Goals	Apps	Goals	Apps	Goals	Apps	Goals	Apps	Goals
Virtus Francavilla	2025–26	Serie D	18	0	0	0	—		—		18	0
Genoa	2025–26	Serie A	2	0	—		—		—		2	0
Rapid București (loan)	2026–27	Liga I	10	0	1	0	—		—		11	0
Career total			30	0	1	0	—		—		31	0
