= Matteo Rossi =

Italian footballer

Personal information
- Date of birth: July 11, 1975
- Place of birth: Genoa, Italy
- Position: Defender

Youth career
- Genoa

Senior career*
Years	Team	Apps	(Gls)
1982–1990	Genoa	3	(0)
1986–1987	→Spezia	8	(0)
1987–1988	→Voghera	8	(0)
1989–1990	→Sestrese	12	(0)
1990–1991	Molassana	13	(0)
1991–1994	Sestri Levante	84	(1)
1994–1995	Cicagna Fontanabuona	20	(2)
2005–2006	Amicizia Lagaccio	21	(0)
1997–1998	Torriglia	7	(0)
- * Club domestic league appearances and goals

Matteo Rossi (born 11 July 1975 in Genoa) is an Italian retired footballer. He played as a defender. He played from 1982 for Genoa youth teams. He made his debut in Serie A on 15 April 1995 with Genoa against Cagliari. He played for 67 minutes before being replaced by Kazuyoshi Miura. On 21 May, he played his second Serie A match against Foggia and his team won 3–0. At the end of the season Genoa was relegated in Serie B, where he played one match. He continued his career in lower series.
