= Burgos CF =

Football club in the north of Spain

Burgos
- Full name: Burgos Club de Fútbol, S.A.D.
- Nicknames: Burgaleses; Blanquinegros (Black-and-Whites)
- Founded: 13 August 1985; 41 years ago
- Stadium: Estadio Municipal El Plantío
- Capacity: 12,194
- President: Marcelo Figoli
- Head coach: Sergio Francisco
- League: Segunda División
- 2025–26: Segunda División, 7th of 22
- Website: burgoscf.es
Home colours	Away colours	Third colours

Burgos Club de Fútbol, S.A.D. is a Spanish football team based in Burgos, in the autonomous community of Castile and León.

The original Burgos CF was dissolved in 1983 after becoming insolvent as a result of its 1980 relegation from the first division. The current Burgos CF was founded in 1985 under the name Club Deportivo Burgos Club de Fútbol, although they did not start competing until 1994.

Burgos CF currently competes in the Segunda División, holding home matches at the Estadio El Plantío, with a capacity of 12,646.

== History ==
=== Early years ===
Burgos CF was founded in 1922, also known as Gimnástica Burgalesa Club de Fútbol.

After four consecutive seasons in Primera División, the club was relegated in the 1979/80 season. In these last two seasons at the top level, notable players included midfielder Miguel Ángel Portugal and defender Antonio García Navajas, both of whom later signed with Real Madrid. Some of the most important coaches during this period were Arsenio Iglesias and Lucien Müller. In 1978, José María Quintano Vadillo replaced Antonio Martínez Laredo as president.

After two seasons in Segunda División, the club suffered a severe financial crisis, which led to their administrative relegation to Segunda División B in the 1981/82 season due to non-payment of players, despite having finished in eighth place.

In the following 1982/83 season, already in Segunda División B, the team finished 3rd in Group I, but the financial situation was unsustainable. Quintano Vadillo was replaced by Bárcena Castrillo as president, and on May 24, 1983, in an Extraordinary General Meeting presided over by Miguel Jerez, the dissolution of the club was agreed.

At that time, the reserve team, Burgos Promesas, had just been promoted to Tercera División, and it was decided to separate it from Burgos CF, allowing it to continue competing as Real Burgos Club de Fútbol. The side participated three seasons in the national top flight but, shortly after its 1993 relegation, ceased in activity, and Burgos CF was immediately refounded.

=== 1994–present ===
In 1994, the new Burgos CF started to play in Primera Provincial, sixth tier, with Félix Arnaiz as head coach. Arnaiz would reach the Tercera División after two consecutive promotions. In 1997 the club promoted for the first time to Segunda División B. After a doubtful first year, where the club avoided relegation in the last weeks of the competition, Burgos CF started to qualify to the promotion play-offs to Segunda División. It would be in 2001, in its third try, when the club would reach its target after defeating Sabadell, Ceuta and Ourense in the play-offs.

In the 2001–02 season, with Enrique Martín as head coach, Burgos would finish 16th but they would be relegated to Segunda División B due to the non-conversion of the club into a Sociedad Anónima Deportiva.

Chart of Burgos CF league performance 1929–present

After this administrative relegation, Burgos would continue playing in Segunda División B, being very close to promotion in the 2007 play-offs, where they were beaten by Sevilla Atlético in extra time of the last round. One year later, the club would be relegated to Tercera División after failing to beat CF Palencia in the last round. The match finished a draw that relegated both teams.

Burgos would spend three seasons in Tercera División after its promotion in the 2011 play-offs, where they beat UD Lanzarote by 4–0 in the second leg played at El Plantío. The promotion was followed by a disastrous campaign in the 2011–12 Segunda División B where the club finished as last qualified of the Group 1.

Only one year later, Burgos CF promoted again to the third tier by beating CD El Palo 3–2 in the second leg of the 2013 play-offs.

On 19 June 2017, one month after avoiding the relegation to Tercera División by winning Linares Deportivo in the play-offs, the assembly of Burgos CF approved the conversion of the club into Sociedad Anónima Deportiva, 16 years later after the first frustrated attempt. The club would achieve this goal on 6 April 2018.

On 4 June 2019, Burgos CF signed an affiliation agreement with CD Nuestra Señora de Belén, for acting as its women's football section.

In 2020–21, Burgos won their group and gained promotion to the second division, 19 years since their last appearance, after defeating Bilbao Athletic in the promotion play-off finals.

=== Club background ===
- Burgos Club de Fútbol (I) - (1936–83)
- Burgos Club de Fútbol - (1985–present)

== Season to season ==
Season	Tier	Division	Place	Copa del Rey
1994–95	6	1ª Reg.	1st	
1995–96	5	Reg. Pref.	1st	
1996–97	4	3ª	1st	
1997–98	3	2ª B	15th	Second round
1998–99	3	2ª B	4th	
1999–2000	3	2ª B	3rd	First round
2000–01	3	2ª B	1st	Round of 64
2001–02	2	2ª	16th	First round
2002–03	3	2ª B	3rd	First round
2003–04	3	2ª B	5th	First round
2004–05	3	2ª B	3rd	Round of 64
2005–06	3	2ª B	3rd	Fourth round
2006–07	3	2ª B	2nd	Third round
2007–08	3	2ª B	18th	Round of 32
2008–09	4	3ª	3rd	
2009–10	4	3ª	1st	
2010–11	4	3ª	1st	First round
2011–12	3	2ª B	20th	First round
2012–13	4	3ª	1st	
2013–14	3	2ª B	10th	Third round

Season	Tier	Division	Place	Copa del Rey
2014–15	3	2ª B	12th	
2015–16	3	2ª B	5th	
2016–17	3	2ª B	16th	First round
2017–18	3	2ª B	11th	
2018–19	3	2ª B	13th	
2019–20	3	2ª B	8th	
2020–21	3	2ª B	1st	Second round
2021–22	2	2ª	11th	Second round
2022–23	2	2ª	11th	Second round
2023–24	2	2ª	9th	Round of 32
2024–25	2	2ª	12th	Second round
2025–26	2	2ª	7th	Round of 16
2026–27	2	2ª		TBD

- 7 seasons in Segunda División
- 19 seasons in Segunda División B
- 5 seasons in Tercera División
- 2 seasons in Categorías Regionales

== Honours ==
- Segunda División B: 2000–01, 2020–21
- Tercera División: 1996–97, 2009–10, 2010–11, 2012–13
- Copa Federación: 1996–97
- Copa Federación (Castile and León tournament): 1996, 1998, 2008, 2012, 2017

== Current squad ==
As of 7 September 2026

Note: Flags indicate national team as defined under FIFA eligibility rules; some limited exceptions apply. Players may hold more than one non-FIFA nationality.

No.	Pos.	Nation	Player
1	GK	ESP	Bruno Iribarne
2	DF	ESP	Álex Lizancos
3	DF	ESP	Ignasi Vilarrasa
4	MF	CHI	Pablo Galdames
5	MF	ESP	Marcelo Expósito
6	DF	ESP	Sergio González
7	FW	ESP	Jon Karrikaburu
8	DF	ESP	Grego Sierra
9	FW	ESP	Álex Forés
10	MF	MTQ	Kévin Appin
11	FW	ESP	Víctor Mollejo
12	MF	ESP	Unai Vencedor
13	GK	ESP	Ander Cantero

No.	Pos.	Nation	Player
14	MF	ESP	David González
15	DF	ESP	Oier Luengo
16	MF	ESP	Curro Sánchez
17	MF	ESP	Mario Cantero
18	DF	ESP	Saúl del Cerro
19	FW	ESP	Javi Llabrés
20	MF	ESP	José Gragera (on loan from Espanyol)
21	MF	ESP	Fermín García
22	DF	ESP	Brais Martínez
23	DF	ESP	Alberto Dadie
24	MF	ARG	Santiago Lencina (on loan from River Plate)
36	DF	ESP	Iván Martínez

=== Reserve team ===
Note: Flags indicate national team as defined under FIFA eligibility rules; some limited exceptions apply. Players may hold more than one non-FIFA nationality.

No.	Pos.	Nation	Player
30	GK	ESP	Marc Monedero
31	FW	ESP	Irian Ribas
35	GK	ESP	Diego González

No.	Pos.	Nation	Player
37	GK	ESP	Cristian Torrelavid
39	DF	ESP	David Hernáiz
40	FW	ESP	Pablo Sagredo

=== Out on loan ===
Note: Flags indicate national team as defined under FIFA eligibility rules; some limited exceptions apply. Players may hold more than one non-FIFA nationality.

No.	Pos.	Nation	Player
—	FW	COL	Mateo Mejía (on loan at Panetolikos until 30 June 2027)

== Coaching staff ==
Position	Staff
Head coach	(Spain) Sergio Francisco
Assistant coach	(Spain) Iosu Rivas
Technical assistant	(Spain) Guillermo Ruiz
Fitness coach	(Spain) Kiko Corredoira
Goalkeeping coach	(Spain) Fran Sanz
Analyst	(Spain) Pedro Gómez
Team delegate	(Spain) José Ramón González
Equipment manager	(Spain) Rubén Gutiérrez (Argentina) Ariel Scarpelli
Physiotherapist	(Spain) Pablo Busto (Spain) Marta Ordoñez (Spain) Rafa Díaz (Spain) Luis Buitrago
Nutritionist	(Spain) Luis Gutiérrez

Last updated: 11 August 2026
Source: Burgos CF (in Spanish)

== Former players ==
- (Argentina) Daniel Pendín
- (Spain) Aritz Aduriz
- (Equatorial Guinea) Juan Epitié
- (Russia) Dmitri Cheryshev

== Presidents ==
- José María Quintano: 1994–2002
- Valentín Germán: 2002–2005
- Domingo Novoa: 2005–2008
- Juan Carlos Barriocanal: 2008–2016
- José Luis García: 2016–2018
- Jesús Martínez: 2018–2019
- Franco Caselli: 2019-2021
