= Chec Bebel Doumbia =

Burkinabe footballer

Chec Doumbia
Personal information
- Full name: Chec Bebel Doumbia
- Date of birth: 15 November 2007 (age 18)
- Place of birth: Ouagadougou, Burkina Faso
- Height: 1.93 m (6 ft 4 in)
- Position: Midfielder

Team information
- Current team: Rapid București (on loan from Genoa)
- Number: 44

Youth career
- Académie Foot Plus
- –2025: Casarano

Senior career*
Years	Team	Apps	(Gls)
2025–2026	Team Altamura	9	(1)
2026–	Genoa	0	(0)
2026	→ Team Altamura (loan)	13	(0)
2026–	→ Rapid București (loan)	6	(0)

International career^{‡}
2026–	Burkina Faso	2	(0)
- * Club domestic league appearances and goals as of 24 October 2026 ‡ National team caps and goals as of 4 October 2026

Chec Bebel Doumbia (born 15 November 2007) is a Burkinabe professional footballer who plays as a midfielder for Liga I club Rapid București, on loan from Serie A club Genoa, and the Burkina Faso national team.

== Career statistics ==
As of 24 October 2026

Appearances and goals by club, season and competition
Club	Season	League			National cup (Note: Includes Cupa României)		Europe		Other		Total	
Club	Season	Division	Apps	Goals	Apps	Goals	Apps	Goals	Apps	Goals	Apps	Goals
Team Altamura	2025–26	Serie C	22	1	—		—		—		22	1
Rapid București (loan)	2026–27	Liga I	6	0	1	0	—		—		7	0
Career total			28	1	1	0	—		—		29	1

=== International ===
As of match played 4 October 2026

Appearances and goals by national team and year
National team	Year	Apps	Goals
Burkina Faso
Burkina Faso	2026	2	0
Total		2	0
