= Genoa CFC Youth Sector =

Italian football club

Genoa
- Full name: Genoa Cricket and Football Club SpA
- Nicknames: I Rossoblu (The Red-Blues), Il Grifone (The Griffin), Il Vecchio Balordo (The Old Fool)
- Founded: 1893; 133 years ago
- Ground: Campo Nazario Gambino, Arenzano, Italy
- Capacity: 7,000
- President: Steven Pasko
- Manager: Jacopo Sbravati (Primavera)
- League: Campionato Primavera 1
- Website: http://genoacfc.it/giovanili
Home colours	Away colours

Genoa Football Club Youth Sector is the youth sections of Genoa, an Italian association football club based in Genoa, Liguria. Their under-19 team (Italian: primavera, lit. 'spring') participated in Campionato Primavera 2. They also participate in the Coppa Italia Primavera.

The under-17 team of the youth sector has participated in the Campionato Allievi Nazionali.

== Primavera ==
=== Current squad ===
As of 8 July 2026

Note: Flags indicate national team as defined under FIFA eligibility rules; some limited exceptions apply. Players may hold more than one non-FIFA nationality.

No.	Pos.	Nation	Player
1	GK	LTU	Ernestas Lysionok
3	DF	ALB	Kris Gecaj
5	DF	FRA	Mamedi Doucouré
8	MF	ITA	Jacopo Grossi
9	FW	ALB	Joi Nuredini
10	FW	ITA	Marco Romano
11	FW	ITA	Elia Spicuglia
13	DF	LTU	Lukas Klišys
21	MF	ITA	Kevin Meola
24	MF	ITA	Roberto Scaglione
26	MF	ISR	Chad Taieb
29	DF	FRA	Jayden Nsingi
30	DF	ITA	Salem Albè
32	GK	LVA	Rendijs Mihelsons
33	GK	ITA	Pietro Baccelli
33	DF	ITA	Edoardo Meconi
42	DF	SVN	Alin Kumer Čelik
48	GK	ITA	Isaac Enoghama

No.	Pos.	Nation	Player
49	FW	ITA	Cristian Galvano
71	MF	ITA	Filippo Carbone
72	DF	ITA	Stefano Arata
75	MF	FRA	Gaël Lafont
77	MF	ITA	Matteo Gibertini
78	FW	ITA	Daniel Ndulue
97	FW	SVK	Adam Žulevič
99	DF	BFA	Latif Ouedraogo
—	DF	LUX	Rodrigo Delgado De Albuquerque
—	DF	ITA	Siaka Diallo Khallouki
—	MF	ROU	Mihai Calițoiu
—	MF	BFA	Chec Bebel Doumbia
—	MF	SEN	Mor Kaire Ndao
—	FW	ROU	Ianis Dobrescu
—	FW	BRA	Felipe Mastropietro
—	FW	FRA	Sami Meheleb
—	FW	ROU	Fernando Pellegrini
—	FW	POL	Borys Skraburski

=== Out on loan ===
Note: Flags indicate national team as defined under FIFA eligibility rules; some limited exceptions apply. Players may hold more than one non-FIFA nationality.

No.	Pos.	Nation	Player

=== Coaching staff ===
As of 8 July 2026

Position	Staff
Head coach	(Italy) Jacopo Sbravati
Assistant coach	(Italy) Vincenzo Cammaroto
Goalkeeping coach	(Italy) Luca Ferro
Athletic coach	(Italy) Jonatan Proietto

Last updated: 8 July 2026

=== Honours ===
Campionato Primavera 1:

Winners(1): 2009/10

Coppa Italia Primavera:

Winners(1): 2008/09

Supercoppa Primavera:

Winners(2): 2009, 2010

Viareggio Cup:

Winners(2): 1965, 2007
Runners-up(2): 2005, 2019

== U18 Men ==
=== Current squad ===
As of 24 September 2023

Note: Flags indicate national team as defined under FIFA eligibility rules; some limited exceptions apply. Players may hold more than one non-FIFA nationality.

No.	Pos.	Nation	Player
—	GK	ITA	Andrea Frasca
—	GK	ITA	Leonardo Consiglio
—	DF	ITA	Luca Colucci
—	DF	ITA	Davide Bosie
—	DF	ITA	Giovanni Camilletti
—	DF	ITA	Stefano Arata
—	DF	ITA	Gracien Deseri
—	DF	ITA	Giorgio Bailo
—	DF	ITA	Nicolò Sancinito
—	DF	ITA	Mattia De Caroli
—	MF	ALB	Eraldi Mata
—	MF	ITA	Daniele Pastorino
—	MF	ITA	Matteo Scimone
—	MF	ITA	Francesco Tassone

No.	Pos.	Nation	Player
—	MF	ITA	Gianmarco Spigariol
—	MF	FRA	Paco Dadi
—	MF	ITA	Daniel Ghinassi
—	MF	ITA	Filippo Dodde
—	MF	ITA	Gabriele Colzi
—	MF	ITA	Alessandro Ivaldi
—	MF	ITA	Jacopo Grossi
—	MF	ITA	Tommaso Fazio
—	FW	ITA	Lorenzo Venturino
—	FW	ITA	Andres Corengia
—	FW	ITA	Christian Lattari
—	FW	ITA	Filippo Carbone
—	FW	ITA	Edoardo Salvador

=== Coaching staff ===
As of 24 September 2023

Position	Staff
Manager	(Italy) Gennaro Ruotolo
Assistant manager	(Italy) Matteo Rossi (Italy) Paolo Mazzieri
Goalkeeper coach	(Italy) Andrea Bellussi
Athletic coach	(Italy) Matteo Lardo

Last updated: 6 March 2023

=== Honours ===
Campionato Nazionale U18:

Winners(1): 2020/21

== U17 Men ==
=== Current squad ===
As of 24 September 2023

Note: Flags indicate national team as defined under FIFA eligibility rules; some limited exceptions apply. Players may hold more than one non-FIFA nationality.

No.	Pos.	Nation	Player
—	GK	LTU	Ernestas Lysionok
—	GK	ITA	Isaac Enoghama
—	GK	ITA	Gabrielle Magalotti
—	GK	ITA	Filippo Massellucci
—	DF	MKD	Toma Georgievski
—	DF	ITA	Lorenzo Colonnese
—	DF	LTU	Lukas Klysis
—	DF	ITA	Martino Odero

No.	Pos.	Nation	Player
—	DF	ITA	Honest Ahanor
—	MF	ITA	Antonio Tarantino
—	MF	ITA	Alessandro Pagliari
—	MF	ITA	Alessio Marconi
—	FW	SVK	Nicolas Gucik
—	FW	LTU	Nedas Garbaliauskas
—	FW	OMA	Suhayb Al Kharusi
—	FW	ALB	Joi Nuredini

=== Coaching staff ===
Position	Staff
Manager	(Italy) Luca Chiappino

Last updated: 7 March 2023

=== Honours ===
Campionato Nazionale U17:

Runners-up(2): 2006/07, 2020/21

== Juniores Women ==
=== Current squad ===
As of 7 March 2023

Note: Flags indicate national team as defined under FIFA eligibility rules; some limited exceptions apply. Players may hold more than one non-FIFA nationality.

No.	Pos.	Nation	Player
—	GK	ITA	Veronica Ferraro
—	GK	ITA	Virginia Orlando
—	GK	ITA	Martina Parodi
—	GK	ITA	Gloria Navarra
—	DF	ITA	Aurora Di Somma
—	DF	ITA	Asia Fusari
—	DF	ITA	Emma Tabone
—	DF	ITA	Carolina Ponte
—	DF	ITA	Carlotta Ligalupo
—	MF	ITA	Asia Malerba
—	MF	ITA	Carlotta Piterà
—	MF	ITA	Alessia Aicardi

No.	Pos.	Nation	Player
—	MF	ALB	Renalba Shahaj
—	MF	ITA	Alice Lombardo
—	MF	ITA	Camilla Pongan
—	MF	ITA	Lara Tabone
—	MF	ITA	Aurora Bovolenta
—	MF	ITA	Michela Sesta
—	FW	ITA	Syria Oliveri
—	FW	ITA	Lucilla Villano
—		ITA	Michela Cesarini
—		ITA	Giorgia Dellacha
—		ITA	Angelica Galetti

=== Coaching staff ===
Position	Staff
Manager	
Assistant manager	(Italy) Gabriele Paganin
Goalkeeping coach	(Italy) Andrea Orlando
Team manager	(Italy) Marco Bascherini

Last updated: 7 March 2023

== U17 Women ==
=== Current squad ===
As of 8 March 2023

Note: Flags indicate national team as defined under FIFA eligibility rules; some limited exceptions apply. Players may hold more than one non-FIFA nationality.

No.	Pos.	Nation	Player
—	GK	ITA	Mikaela Gucciardi
—	GK	ITA	Irene Pensiero
—	GK	ITA	Sara Zurzolo
—	DF	ITA	Sara Bascherini
—	DF	ITA	Cecilia Croce
—	DF	ITA	Sofia De Cantellis
—	DF	ITA	Melissa Floris
—	DF	ITA	Valentina Pallavicini
—	DF	ITA	Dulari Sarchielli
—	DF	ITA	Rachele Tinella
—	MF	ITA	Veronica Blasi

No.	Pos.	Nation	Player
—	MF	ITA	Erika Grasso
—	MF	ITA	Ilaria Matzedda
—	MF	ITA	Cecilia Pezzi
—	FW	ITA	Federica Buccini
—	FW	ITA	Marta Colombi
—	FW	ITA	Angelica Galetti
—	FW	ITA	Elena Gandolfo
—	FW	ITA	Anita Manis
—	FW	ITA	Daniela Patrone
—	FW	ITA	Greta Rossi

=== Coaching staff ===
Position	Staff
Manager	(Italy) Luca De Guglielmi

Last updated: 8 March 2023
