= Burgos CF Promesas =

Association football club in Spain

Burgos Promesas
- Full name: Burgos Club de Fútbol Promesas
- Nicknames: BP, Burgos B
- Founded: 2000; 26 years ago
- Stadium: Ciudad Deportiva de Castañares
- Capacity: 500
- President: Nacho San Millan
- Head coach: Carlos Aguilera Ruiz
- League: Tercera Federación – Group 8
- 2025–26: Segunda Federación – Group 1, 16th of 18 (relegated)
- Website: http://www.burgospromesas.com/
Home colours	Away colours	Third colours

Burgos Club de Fútbol Promesas, formerly Club Deportivo Burgos Promesas 2000, is a Spanish football team based in Burgos, in the autonomous community of Castile and León. Founded in 2000, it is the reserve team of Burgos CF and plays in Tercera Federación – Group 8, holding home matches at Ciudad Deportiva de Castañares.

== History ==
Club logo until 2020

On 4 May 2020, Burgos Promesas reached an agreement with Burgos CF to become their reserve team until 2034. The club was then renamed to Burgos CF Promesas.

== Season to season ==
- As an independent club

Season	Tier	Division	Place	Copa del Rey
2000–01	6	1ª Prov.	6th	
2001–02	6	1ª Prov.	2nd	
2002–03	6	1ª Prov.	2nd	
2003–04	6	1ª Prov.	1st	
2004–05	5	1ª Reg.	12th	
2005–06	5	1ª Reg.	9th	
2006–07	5	1ª Reg.	10th	
2007–08	5	1ª Reg.	4th	
2008–09	5	1ª Reg.	3rd	
2009–10	5	1ª Reg.	7th	

Season	Tier	Division	Place	Copa del Rey
2010–11	5	1ª Reg.	2nd	
2011–12	4	3ª	19th	
2012–13	5	1ª Reg.	5th	
2013–14	5	1ª Reg.	2nd	
2014–15	4	3ª	16th	
2015–16	4	3ª	15th	
2016–17	4	3ª	15th	
2017–18	4	3ª	16th	
2018–19	4	3ª	10th	
2019–20	4	3ª	5th	

- As a reserve team of Burgos CF

Season	Tier	Division	Place
2020–21	4	3ª	2nd / 4th
2021–22	4	2ª RFEF	9th
2022–23	4	2ª Fed.	16th
2023–24	5	3ª Fed.	13th
2024–25	5	3ª Fed.	3rd
2025–26	4	2ª Fed.	16th
2026–27	5	3ª Fed.	

- 3 seasons in Segunda Federación/Segunda División RFEF
- 8 seasons in Tercera División
- 3 seasons in Tercera Federación

== Current squad ==
As of 7 September 2026

Note: Flags indicate national team as defined under FIFA eligibility rules; some limited exceptions apply. Players may hold more than one non-FIFA nationality.

No.	Pos.	Nation	Player
1	GK	ESP	Diego González
2	DF	ESP	Héctor Royo
3	DF	ESP	David Hernáiz
4	DF	ESP	Dani Ruiz
5	DF	ESP	Javi Caño
6	MF	ESP	Hugo Sedano
7	FW	ESP	Jesús Ares
8	MF	ESP	Sergio Romero
9	FW	ESP	Irian Ribas
10	FW	ESP	Ethan Ventosa
11	FW	ESP	Pablo Sagredo
12	DF	ESP	Pablo Pereda
13	GK	ESP	Marcos Riaño

No.	Pos.	Nation	Player
14	FW	MAR	Ayman Rajouani
15	MF	ESP	Álex Alba
17	MF	ESP	Ander Barck
18	FW	ESP	Dani Martí
19	DF	MAR	Amin Rajouani
20	DF	ESP	Marcos Hernando
21	DF	ESP	Javi Tejedor
22	MF	ESP	Hugo López
23	MF	ESP	Jan Martínez
25	GK	ESP	Cristian Torrelavid
—	GK	ESP	Marc Monedero
—	FW	ARG	Pablo Memet

=== From Youth Academy ===
Note: Flags indicate national team as defined under FIFA eligibility rules; some limited exceptions apply. Players may hold more than one non-FIFA nationality.

No.	Pos.	Nation	Player
26	FW	ESP	Dani San Millán
27	FW	ESP	Germán Iglesias

=== Current staff ===
Position	Staff
Head coach	(Spain) Álex Albístegui
Assistant coach	(Spain) Alfredo Martín
Goalkeeping coach	(Spain) Álex Aparicio (Spain) Carmen Alegre
Fitness coach	(Spain) Miguel Infante
Delegate	(Spain) Juan Villaverde
Kit man	(Spain) Emilio Basconcillos

Last updated: 8 November 2021
Source: Plantilla Promesas Cuerpo técnico (in Spanish)
