= 2024–25 Serie A =

123rd season of top-tier Italian football

Serie A
- Season: 2024–25
- Dates: 17 August 2024 – 25 May 2025
- Champions: Napoli; 4th title
- Relegated: Empoli; Venezia; Monza
- Champions League: Napoli; Inter Milan; Atalanta; Juventus
- Europa League: Roma; Bologna (as Coppa Italia winners)
- Conference League: Fiorentina
- Matches: 380
- Goals: 973 (2.56 per match)
- Top goalscorer: Mateo Retegui (25 goals)
- Biggest home win: Bologna 5–0 Lazio (16 March 2025)
- Biggest away win: Lecce 0–6 Fiorentina (20 October 2024); Lazio 0–6 Inter Milan (16 December 2024)
- Highest scoring: Inter Milan 4–4 Juventus (27 October 2024)
- Longest winning run: Atalanta (11 matches)
- Longest unbeaten run: Juventus (21 matches)
- Longest winless run: Empoli (20 matches)
- Longest losing run: Monza (6 matches)
- Highest attendance: 75,502; AC Milan 0–0 Juventus (23 November 2024)
- Lowest attendance: 1,449; Empoli 1–1 Udinese (25 November 2024)
- Total attendance: 11,719,935
- Average attendance: 30,842

The 2024–25 Serie A (known as the Serie A Enilive and Serie A Made in Italy for sponsorship reasons domestically and abroad, respectively) was the 123rd season of top-tier Italian football, the 93rd in a round-robin tournament, and the 15th since its organization under an own league committee, the Lega Serie A. Napoli won the title following a 2–0 victory over Cagliari at the Stadio Diego Armando Maradona on 23 May 2025.

Napoli's title was their fourth league title in club history and their second in three seasons. Inter Milan, who were the defending champions, finished one point behind Napoli.

== Teams ==
Parma returned to the Serie A after three years, while Venezia returned after two. Como were promoted for the first time since the 2002–2003 season — bringing 21 consecutive years in the lower leagues to an end.

Frosinone were relegated to the Serie B after just one year in the top league — ending what was only their third Serie A appearance in their 119-year history. Conversely, Sassuolo's longest stint in the Serie A since their founding in 1920 came to an end after 11 seasons. Salernitana were relegated after three years.

=== Team changes ===
| Promoted from 2023–24 Serie B | Relegated from 2023–24 Serie A |
|---|---|
| Parma | Frosinone |
| Como | Sassuolo |
| Venezia | Salernitana |

Locations of the 2024–25 Serie A teams
Location of teams in 2026–27 Serie A (Lombardy)

=== Stadiums and locations ===
| Team | Location | Stadium | Capacity |
|---|---|---|---|
| Atalanta | Bergamo | Gewiss Stadium | 23,439 |
| Bologna | Bologna | Stadio Renato Dall'Ara | 36,000 |
| Cagliari | Cagliari | Unipol Domus | 16,416 |
| Como | Como | Stadio Giuseppe Sinigaglia | 13,602 |
| Empoli | Empoli | Stadio Carlo Castellani - Computer Gross Arena | 16,167 |
| Fiorentina | Florence | Stadio Artemio Franchi | 43,118 |
| Genoa | Genoa | Stadio Luigi Ferraris | 33,205 |
| Hellas Verona | Verona | Stadio Marcantonio Bentegodi | 31,713 |
| Inter Milan | Milan | San Siro | 75,710 |
| Juventus | Turin | Juventus Stadium | 41,507 |
| Lazio | Rome | Stadio Olimpico | 67,585 |
| Lecce | Lecce | Stadio Via del mare | 30,354 |
| AC Milan | Milan | San Siro | 75,710 |
| Monza | Monza | Stadio Brianteo | 17,102 |
| Napoli | Naples | Stadio Diego Armando Maradona | 54,732 |
| Parma | Parma | Stadio Ennio Tardini | 22,352 |
| Roma | Rome | Stadio Olimpico | 67,585 |
| Torino | Turin | Stadio Olimpico Grande Torino | 28,177 |
| Udinese | Udine | Stadio Friuli | 25,132 |
| Venezia | Venice | Stadio Pier Luigi Penzo | 11,150 |

=== Personnel and kits ===
| Team | Chairman | Manager | Captain | Kit maker | Shirt sponsor(s) | |
| Team | Chairman | Manager | Captain | Kit maker | Main | Other(s) |
|---|---|---|---|---|---|---|
| Atalanta | (Italy) Antonio Percassi | (Italy) Gian Piero Gasperini | (Italy) Rafael Tolói | Joma | Lete | List: Front: Radici Group / zondacrypto (in cup matches); Back: Gewiss; Sleeves: zondacrypto / Radici Group (in cup and UEFA matches) |
| Bologna | (Canada) Joey Saputo | (Italy) Vincenzo Italiano | (Scotland) Lewis Ferguson | Macron | Saputo Inc. | List: Front: None; Back: Selenella; Sleeves: Lavoropiù |
| Cagliari | (Italy) Tommaso Giulini | (Italy) Davide Nicola | (Italy) Leonardo Pavoletti | EYE Sport | Sardegna / AeroItalia (in cup matches) | List: Front: Moby Lines; Back: Doppio Malto; Sleeves: Latte Arborea |
| Como | (Indonesia) Mirwan Suwarso | (Spain) Cesc Fàbregas | (Italy) Alessandro Gabrielloni | Adidas | Uber | List: Front: None; Back: Neuberger Berman; Sleeves: Polytron (Home & Away) / Quelli che... con LUCA Onlus (Third) |
| Empoli | (Italy) Fabrizio Corsi | (Italy) Roberto D'Aversa | (Italy) Alberto Grassi | Kappa | Computer Gross | List: Front: Saint-Gobain; Back: Pediatrica; Sleeves: Sammontana |
| Fiorentina | (United States) Rocco B. Commisso | (Italy) Raffaele Palladino | (Italy) Luca Ranieri | Kappa | Mediacom | List: Front: None; Back: Lamioni Holding; Sleeves: Betway Scores |
| Genoa | (Romania) Dan Șucu | (France) Patrick Vieira | (Croatia) Milan Badelj | Kappa | Pulsee Luce e Gas | List: Front: Ceres c'è / Squid Game 2; Back: MSC Cruises; Sleeves: Cepsa / Netflix / Ceres c'è |
| Hellas Verona | (United States) Italo Zanzi | (Italy) Paolo Zanetti | (Serbia) Darko Lazović | Joma | 958 Santero / Hellas Verona Foundation (in cup matches) | List: Front: Conforama; Back: VetroCar; Sleeves: Drivalia |
| Inter Milan | (Italy) Giuseppe Marotta | (Italy) Simone Inzaghi | (Argentina) Lautaro Martínez | Nike | Betsson.sport | List: Front: None; Back: U-Power; Sleeves: GATE.io |
| Juventus | (Italy) Gianluca Ferrero | (Croatia) Igor Tudor | (Italy) Manuel Locatelli | Adidas | Save the Children | List: Front: None; Back: Cygames; Sleeves: Azimut Holding |
| Lazio | (Italy) Claudio Lotito | (Italy) Marco Baroni | (Italy) Mattia Zaccagni | Mizuno | Casa di Cura Villa Mafalda | List: Front: None; Back: Aeroitalia; Sleeves: None |
| Lecce | (Italy) Saverio Sticchi Damiani | (Italy) Marco Giampaolo | (Italy) Federico Baschirotto | M908 | DEGHI | List: Front: BetItaly Pay; Back: DR Automobiles; Sleeves: Banca Popolare Pugliese |
| AC Milan | (Italy) Paolo Scaroni | (Portugal) Sérgio Conceição | (France) Mike Maignan | Puma | Emirates | List: Front: None; Back: Bitpanda; Sleeves: MSC Cruises |
| Monza | (Italy) Paolo Berlusconi | (Italy) Alessandro Nesta | (Italy) Matteo Pessina | Lotto | Motorola | List: Front: U-Power; Back: Pulsee Luce e Gas; Sleeves: Ford Pro |
| Napoli | (Italy) Aurelio De Laurentiis | (Italy) Antonio Conte | (Italy) Giovanni Di Lorenzo | EA7 | MSC Cruises | List: Front: None; Back: Acqua Sorgesana; Sleeves: None |
| Parma | (United States) Kyle Krause | (Romania) Cristian Chivu | (Italy) Enrico Delprato | Puma | Prometeon | List: Front: Admiralbet.news; Back: inX.aero; Sleeves: Crédit Agricole Italia |
| Roma | (United States) Dan Friedkin | (Italy) Claudio Ranieri | (Italy) Lorenzo Pellegrini | Adidas | Riyadh Season | List: Front: None; Back: Auberge Resorts; Sleeves: None |
| Torino | (Italy) Urbano Cairo | (Italy) Riccardo Baroni | (Colombia) Duván Zapata | Joma | Suzuki | List: Front: Fratelli Beretta; Back: EdiliziAcrobatica; Sleeves: JD Sports |
| Udinese | (Italy) Franco Soldati | (Germany) Kosta Runjaić | (France) Florian Thauvin | Macron | Io sono Friuli-Venezia Giulia | List: Front: Banca 360 FVG; Back: Bluenergy; Sleeves: Apu Apustaja |
| Venezia | (United States) Duncan L. Niederauer | (Italy) Eusebio Di Francesco | (Indonesia) Jay Idzes | Nocta | Cynar Spritz | List: Front: None; Back: Baxi; Sleeves: Bechèr |

=== Managerial changes ===
| Team | Outgoing manager | Manner of departure | Date of vacancy | Position in table | Replaced by | Date of appointment |
|---|---|---|---|---|---|---|
| Lazio | (Croatia) Igor Tudor | Resigned | 5 June 2024 | Pre-season | (Italy) Marco Baroni | 1 July 2024 |
| Bologna | (Italy) Thiago Motta | End of contract | 30 June 2024 | Pre-season | (Italy) Vincenzo Italiano | 1 July 2024 |
| Fiorentina | (Italy) Vincenzo Italiano | End of contract | 30 June 2024 | Pre-season | (Italy) Raffaele Palladino | 1 July 2024 |
| Monza | (Italy) Raffaele Palladino | End of contract | 30 June 2024 | Pre-season | (Italy) Alessandro Nesta | 1 July 2024 |
| Napoli | (Italy) Francesco Calzona | End of contract | 30 June 2024 | Pre-season | (Italy) Antonio Conte | 1 July 2024 |
| Torino | (Croatia) Ivan Jurić | End of contract | 30 June 2024 | Pre-season | (Italy) Paolo Vanoli | 1 July 2024 |
| Udinese | (Italy) Fabio Cannavaro | End of contract | 30 June 2024 | Pre-season | (Germany) Kosta Runjaić | 1 July 2024 |
| Cagliari | (Italy) Claudio Ranieri | Retired | 30 June 2024 | Pre-season | (Italy) Davide Nicola | 5 July 2024 |
| Juventus | (Uruguay) Paolo Montero | End of caretaker spell | 30 June 2024 | Pre-season | (Italy) Thiago Motta | 1 July 2024 |
| AC Milan | (Italy) Stefano Pioli | Mutual consent | 30 June 2024 | Pre-season | (Portugal) Paulo Fonseca | 1 July 2024 |
| Hellas Verona | (Italy) Marco Baroni | Mutual consent | 30 June 2024 | Pre-season | (Italy) Paolo Zanetti | 1 July 2024 |
| Venezia | (Italy) Paolo Vanoli | Mutual consent | 30 June 2024 | Pre-season | (Italy) Eusebio Di Francesco | 1 July 2024 |
| Empoli | (Italy) Davide Nicola | Mutual consent | 2 July 2024 | Pre-season | (Italy) Roberto D'Aversa | 2 July 2024 |
| Como | (Wales) Osian Roberts | End of caretaker spell | 19 July 2024 | Pre-season | (Spain) Cesc Fàbregas | 19 July 2024 |
| Roma | (Italy) Daniele De Rossi | Sacked | 18 September 2024 | 16th | (Croatia) Ivan Jurić | 18 September 2024 |
| Lecce | (Italy) Luca Gotti | Sacked | 9 November 2024 | 18th | (Italy) Marco Giampaolo | 11 November 2024 |
| Roma | (Croatia) Ivan Jurić | Sacked | 10 November 2024 | 12th | (Italy) Claudio Ranieri | 14 November 2024 |
| Genoa | (Italy) Alberto Gilardino | Sacked | 19 November 2024 | 17th | (France) Patrick Vieira | 20 November 2024 |
| Monza | (Italy) Alessandro Nesta | Sacked | 23 December 2024 | 20th | (Italy) Salvatore Bocchetti | 23 December 2024 |
| AC Milan | (Portugal) Paulo Fonseca | Sacked | 30 December 2024 | 8th | (Portugal) Sérgio Conceição | 30 December 2024 |
| Monza | (Italy) Salvatore Bocchetti | Sacked | 10 February 2025 | 20th | (Italy) Alessandro Nesta | 10 February 2025 |
| Parma | (Italy) Fabio Pecchia | Sacked | 17 February 2025 | 18th | (Romania) Cristian Chivu | 18 February 2025 |
| Juventus | (Italy) Thiago Motta | Sacked | 23 March 2025 | 5th | (Croatia) Igor Tudor | 23 March 2025 |

== League table ==
| Pos | Team | Pld | W | D | L | GF | GA | GD | Pts | Qualification or relegation |
|---|---|---|---|---|---|---|---|---|---|---|
| 1 | Napoli (C) | 38 | 24 | 10 | 4 | 59 | 27 | +32 | 82 | Champions League league phase |
| 2 | Inter Milan | 38 | 24 | 9 | 5 | 79 | 35 | +44 | 81 | Champions League league phase |
| 3 | Atalanta | 38 | 22 | 8 | 8 | 78 | 37 | +41 | 74 | Champions League league phase |
| 4 | Juventus | 38 | 18 | 16 | 4 | 58 | 35 | +23 | 70 | Champions League league phase |
| 5 | Roma | 38 | 20 | 9 | 9 | 56 | 35 | +21 | 69 | Europa League league phase |
| 6 | Fiorentina | 38 | 19 | 8 | 11 | 60 | 41 | +19 | 65 (Note: Fiorentina finished ahead of Lazio on head-to-head points: Fiorentina 2–1 Lazio, Lazio 1–2 Fiorentina.) | Conference League play-off round |
| 7 | Lazio | 38 | 18 | 11 | 9 | 61 | 49 | +12 | 65 | |
| 8 | Milan | 38 | 18 | 9 | 11 | 61 | 43 | +18 | 63 | |
| 9 | Bologna | 38 | 16 | 14 | 8 | 57 | 47 | +10 | 62 | Europa League league phase (Note: Bologna qualified for the Europa League league stage as the winners of the 2024–25 Coppa Italia.) |
| 10 | Como | 38 | 13 | 10 | 15 | 49 | 52 | −3 | 49 | |
| 11 | Torino | 38 | 10 | 14 | 14 | 39 | 45 | −6 | 44 (Note: Torino finished ahead of Udinese on head-to-head points: Udinese 2–2 Torino, Torino 2–0 Udinese.) | |
| 12 | Udinese | 38 | 12 | 8 | 18 | 41 | 56 | −15 | 44 | |
| 13 | Genoa | 38 | 10 | 13 | 15 | 37 | 49 | −12 | 43 | |
| 14 | Hellas Verona | 38 | 10 | 7 | 21 | 34 | 66 | −32 | 37 | |
| 15 | Cagliari | 38 | 9 | 9 | 20 | 40 | 56 | −16 | 36 (Note: Cagliari finished ahead of Parma on head-to-head points: Parma 2–3 Cagliari, Cagliari 2–1 Parma.) | |
| 16 | Parma | 38 | 7 | 15 | 16 | 44 | 58 | −14 | 36 | |
| 17 | Lecce | 38 | 8 | 10 | 20 | 27 | 58 | −31 | 34 | |
| 18 | Empoli (R) | 38 | 6 | 13 | 19 | 33 | 59 | −26 | 31 | Relegation to Serie B |
| 19 | Venezia (R) | 38 | 5 | 14 | 19 | 32 | 56 | −24 | 29 | Relegation to Serie B |
| 20 | Monza (R) | 38 | 3 | 9 | 26 | 28 | 69 | −41 | 18 | Relegation to Serie B |

Source: Serie A
Rules for classification: 1) Points; 2) Tiebreaker for Champions team and third relegated team; 3) Head-to-head points; 4) Head-to-head goal difference; 5) Goal difference; 6) Goals scored; 7) Draw.
(Note: Head-to-head record is used only after all the matches between the teams in question have been played)
(C) Champions; (R) Relegated

== Results ==
| Home \ Away | ATA | BOL | CAG | COM | EMP | FIO | GEN | VER | INT | JUV | LAZ | LEC | MIL | MON | NAP | PAR | ROM | TOR | UDI | VEN |
|---|---|---|---|---|---|---|---|---|---|---|---|---|---|---|---|---|---|---|---|---|
| Atalanta | — | 2–0 | 0–0 | 2–3 | 3–2 | 3–2 | 5–1 | 6–1 | 0–2 | 1–1 | 0–1 | 1–1 | 2–1 | 2–0 | 2–3 | 2–3 | 2–1 | 1–1 | 2–1 | 0–0 |
| Bologna | 1–1 | — | 2–1 | 2–0 | 1–1 | 1–0 | 1–3 | 2–3 | 1–0 | 1–1 | 5–0 | 1–0 | 2–1 | 3–1 | 1–1 | 0–0 | 2–2 | 3–2 | 1–1 | 3–0 |
| Cagliari | 0–1 | 0–2 | — | 1–1 | 0–2 | 1–2 | 1–1 | 1–0 | 0–3 | 0–1 | 1–2 | 4–1 | 3–3 | 3–0 | 0–4 | 2–1 | 0–0 | 3–2 | 1–2 | 3–0 |
| Como | 1–2 | 2–2 | 3–1 | — | 1–1 | 0–2 | 1–0 | 3–2 | 0–2 | 1–2 | 1–5 | 2–0 | 1–2 | 1–1 | 2–1 | 1–1 | 2–0 | 1–0 | 4–1 | 1–1 |
| Empoli | 0–5 | 1–1 | 0–0 | 1–0 | — | 0–0 | 1–2 | 1–2 | 0–3 | 0–0 | 0–1 | 1–3 | 0–2 | 0–0 | 0–1 | 2–1 | 0–1 | 0–1 | 1–1 | 2–2 |
| Fiorentina | 1–0 | 3–2 | 1–0 | 0–2 | 2–1 | — | 2–1 | 3–1 | 3–0 | 3–0 | 2–1 | 1–0 | 2–1 | 2–2 | 0–3 | 0–0 | 5–1 | 1–1 | 1–2 | 0–0 |
| Genoa | 2–3 | 2–2 | 2–2 | 1–1 | 1–1 | 0–1 | — | 0–2 | 2–2 | 0–3 | 0–2 | 2–1 | 1–2 | 2–0 | 1–2 | 1–0 | 1–1 | 0–0 | 1–0 | 2–0 |
| Hellas Verona | 0–5 | 1–2 | 0–2 | 1–1 | 1–4 | 1–0 | 0–0 | — | 0–5 | 0–3 | 0–3 | 1–1 | 0–1 | 0–3 | 3–0 | 0–0 | 3–2 | 2–3 | 0–0 | 2–1 |
| Inter Milan | 4–0 | 2–2 | 3–1 | 2–0 | 3–1 | 2–1 | 1–0 | 1–0 | — | 4–4 | 2–2 | 2–0 | 1–2 | 3–2 | 1–1 | 3–1 | 0–1 | 3–2 | 2–1 | 1–0 |
| Juventus | 0–4 | 2–2 | 1–1 | 3–0 | 4–1 | 2–2 | 1–0 | 2–0 | 1–0 | — | 1–0 | 2–1 | 2–0 | 2–0 | 0–0 | 2–2 | 0–0 | 2–0 | 2–0 | 2–2 |
| Lazio | 1–1 | 3–0 | 2–1 | 1–1 | 2–1 | 1–2 | 3–0 | 2–1 | 0–6 | 1–1 | — | 0–1 | 2–2 | 5–1 | 2–2 | 2–2 | 1–1 | 1–1 | 1–1 | 3–1 |
| Lecce | 0–4 | 0–0 | 1–0 | 0–3 | 1–1 | 0–6 | 0–0 | 1–0 | 0–4 | 1–1 | 1–2 | — | 2–3 | 2–1 | 0–1 | 2–2 | 0–1 | 1–0 | 0–1 | 1–1 |
| AC Milan | 0–1 | 3–1 | 1–1 | 2–1 | 3–0 | 2–2 | 0–0 | 1–0 | 1–1 | 0–0 | 1–2 | 3–0 | — | 2–0 | 0–2 | 3–2 | 1–1 | 2–2 | 1–0 | 4–0 |
| Monza | 0–4 | 1–2 | 1–2 | 1–3 | 1–3 | 2–1 | 0–1 | 0–1 | 1–1 | 1–2 | 0–1 | 0–0 | 0–1 | — | 0–1 | 1–1 | 1–1 | 0–2 | 1–2 | 2–2 |
| Napoli | 0–3 | 3–0 | 2–0 | 3–1 | 3–0 | 2–1 | 2–2 | 2–0 | 1–1 | 2–1 | 0–1 | 1–0 | 2–1 | 2–0 | — | 2–1 | 1–0 | 2–0 | 1–1 | 1–0 |
| Parma | 1–3 | 2–0 | 2–3 | 0–1 | 1–1 | 1–1 | 0–1 | 2–3 | 2–2 | 1–0 | 3–1 | 1–3 | 2–1 | 2–1 | 0–0 | — | 0–1 | 2–2 | 2–3 | 1–1 |
| Roma | 0–2 | 2–3 | 1–0 | 2–1 | 1–2 | 1–0 | 3–1 | 1–0 | 0–1 | 1–1 | 2–0 | 4–1 | 3–1 | 4–0 | 1–1 | 5–0 | — | 1–0 | 3–0 | 2–1 |
| Torino | 2–1 | 0–2 | 2–0 | 1–0 | 1–0 | 0–1 | 1–1 | 1–1 | 0–2 | 1–1 | 2–3 | 0–0 | 2–1 | 1–1 | 0–1 | 0–0 | 0–2 | — | 2–0 | 1–1 |
| Udinese | 0–0 | 0–0 | 2–0 | 1–0 | 3–0 | 2–3 | 0–2 | 0–1 | 2–3 | 0–2 | 2–1 | 1–0 | 0–4 | 1–2 | 1–3 | 1–0 | 1–2 | 2–2 | — | 3–2 |
| Venezia | 0–2 | 0–1 | 2–1 | 2–2 | 1–1 | 2–1 | 2–0 | 1–1 | 0–1 | 2–3 | 0–0 | 0–1 | 0–2 | 1–0 | 0–0 | 1–2 | 0–1 | 0–1 | 3–2 | — |

Source: Serie A
Legend: Blue = home team win; Yellow = draw; Red = away team win.
For upcoming matches, an "a" indicates there is an article about the rivalry between the two participants.

== Season statistics ==
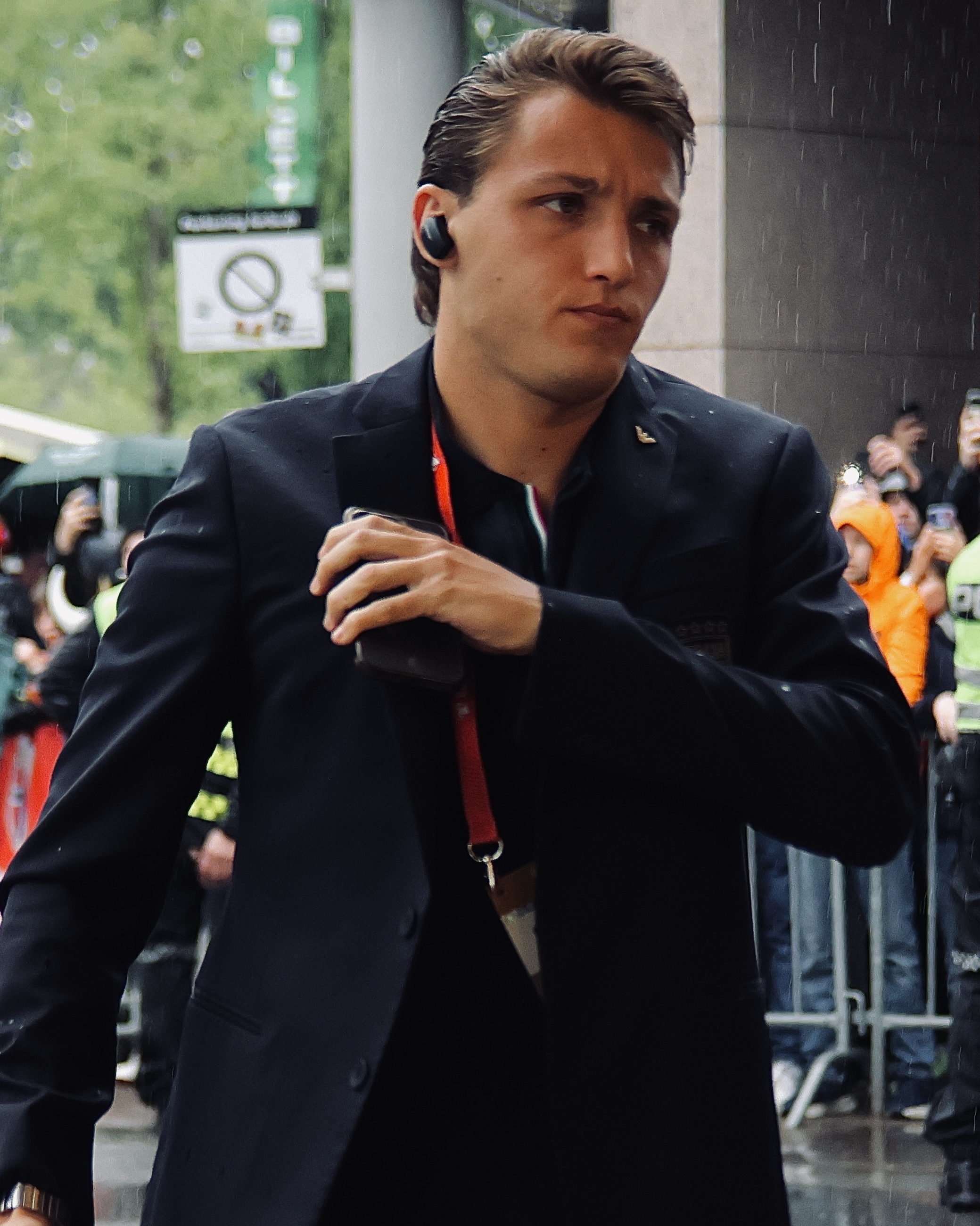
Atalanta's Mateo Retegui was this season's top scorer with 25 goals.

=== Top goalscorers ===
| Rank | Player | Club | Goals |
|---|---|---|---|
| 1 | (Italy) Mateo Retegui | Atalanta | 25 |
| 2 | (Italy) Moise Kean | Fiorentina | 19 |
| 3 | (Nigeria) Ademola Lookman | Atalanta | 15 |
| 3 | (Italy) Riccardo Orsolini | Bologna | 15 |
| 5 | (Belgium) Romelu Lukaku | Napoli | 14 |
| 5 | (France) Marcus Thuram | Inter Milan | 14 |
| 7 | (Ukraine) Artem Dovbyk | Roma | 12 |
| 7 | (Italy) Lorenzo Lucca | Udinese | 12 |
| 7 | (Argentina) Lautaro Martínez | Inter Milan | 12 |
| 7 | (Scotland) Scott McTominay | Napoli | 12 |

=== Hat-tricks ===
| Player | Club | Against | Result | Date |
|---|---|---|---|---|
| (Italy) Mateo Retegui | Atalanta | Genoa | 5–1 (H) | 5 October 2024 |
| (France) Marcus Thuram | Inter Milan | Torino | 3–2 (H) | 5 October 2024 |
| (Italy) Moise Kean | Fiorentina | Hellas Verona | 3–1 (H) | 10 November 2024 |
| (Italy) Mateo Retegui^{4} | Atalanta | Hellas Verona | 5–0 (A) | 8 February 2025 |

Notes

^{4} Player scored 4 goals
(H) – Home team
(A) – Away team

=== Clean sheets ===
| Rank | Player | Club | Clean sheets |
|---|---|---|---|
| 1 | (Italy) Alex Meret (Note: Including one clean sheet shared with Elia Caprile.) | Napoli | 17 |
| 2 | (Serbia) Mile Svilar | Roma | 16 |
| 3 | (Italy) Michele Di Gregorio | Juventus | 14 |
| 4 | (Italy) Marco Carnesecchi | Atalanta | 13 |
| 4 | (France) Mike Maignan (Note: Including one clean sheet shared with Marco Sportiello.) | AC Milan | 13 |
| 4 | (Switzerland) Yann Sommer | Inter Milan | 13 |
| 7 | (Spain) David de Gea | Fiorentina | 11 |
| 8 | (Italy) Nicola Leali | Genoa | 10 |
| 8 | (Serbia) Vanja Milinković-Savić | Torino | 10 |
| 10 | (Italy) Wladimiro Falcone | Lecce | 9 |

=== Discipline ===
==== Player ====
- Most yellow cards: 13
  - (Italy) Nicolò Rovella (Lazio)
- Most red cards: 2
  - (Morocco) Reda Belahyane (Hellas Verona / Lazio)
  - (France) Frédéric Guilbert (Lecce)
  - (Italy) Tommaso Pobega (Bologna)
  - (Croatia) Ante Rebić (Lecce)
  - (Italy) Alessio Romagnoli (Lazio)
  - (France) Isaak Touré (Udinese)

==== Club ====
- Most yellow cards: 89
  - Lazio
- Fewest yellow cards: 48
  - Napoli
- Most red cards: 10
  - Hellas Verona
- Fewest red cards: 0
  - Napoli

== Awards ==
=== Monthly awards ===
| Month | Player of the Month | | Coach of the Month | | Goal of the Month | |
| Month | Player | Club | Coach | Club | Player | Club |
|---|---|---|---|---|---|---|
| August | (France) Marcus Thuram | Inter Milan | (Italy) Paolo Vanoli | Torino | (Italy) Nicolò Barella | Inter Milan |
| September | (Georgia (country)) Khvicha Kvaratskhelia | Napoli | (Italy) Antonio Conte | Napoli | (Equatorial Guinea) Saúl Coco | Torino |
| October | (Italy) Mateo Retegui | Atalanta | (Italy) Marco Baroni | Lazio | (Italy) Luca Mazzitelli | Como |
| November | (Italy) Moise Kean | Fiorentina | (Italy) Gian Piero Gasperini | Atalanta | (Italy) Gabriele Zappa | Cagliari |
| December | (Argentina) Paulo Dybala | Roma | (Italy) Simone Inzaghi | Inter Milan | (Scotland) Ché Adams | Torino |
| January | (Cameroon) André-Frank Zambo Anguissa | Napoli | (Italy) Antonio Conte | Napoli | (Turkey) Kenan Yıldız | Juventus |
| February | (France) Randal Kolo Muani | Juventus | (Italy) Claudio Ranieri | Roma | (Italy) Moise Kean | Fiorentina |
| March | (Ukraine) Artem Dovbyk | Roma | (Italy) Vincenzo Italiano | Bologna | (Slovakia) Ondrej Duda | Hellas Verona |
| April | (Scotland) Scott McTominay | Napoli | (Spain) Cesc Fàbregas | Como | (Switzerland) Dan Ndoye | Bologna |
| May | (France) Khéphren Thuram | Juventus | (Spain) Cesc Fàbregas | Como | (Scotland) Scott McTominay | Napoli |

=== Seasonal awards ===
| Award | Winner | Club | Ref. |
|---|---|---|---|
| Most Valuable Player | (Scotland) Scott McTominay | Napoli | |
| Best Under-23 | (Argentina) Nico Paz | Como | |
| Best Goalkeeper | (Serbia) Mile Svilar | Roma | |
| Best Defender | (Italy) Alessandro Bastoni | Inter Milan | |
| Best Midfielder | (Netherlands) Tijjani Reijnders | AC Milan | |
| Best Striker | (Italy) Mateo Retegui | Atalanta | |
| Coach of the Season | (Italy) Antonio Conte | Napoli | |
| Goal of the Season | (Turkey) Kenan Yıldız | Juventus | |
| Fair Play Moment | (Italy) Claudio Ranieri | Roma | |

Team of the Season
| Pos. | Player | Club |
|---|---|---|
| GK | (Spain) David de Gea | Fiorentina |
| DF | (Italy) Alessandro Bastoni | Inter Milan |
| DF | (Italy) Federico Dimarco | Inter Milan |
| DF | (Italy) Alessandro Buongiorno | Napoli |
| DF | (Italy) Giovanni Di Lorenzo | Napoli |
| DF | (Kosovo) Amir Rrahmani | Napoli |
| DF | (Ivory Coast) Evan Ndicka | Roma |
| MF | (Turkey) Kenan Yıldız | Juventus |
| MF | (Italy) Manuel Locatelli | Juventus |
| MF | (Argentina) Nico Paz | Como |
| MF | (France) Khéphren Thuram | Juventus |
| MF | (United States) Christian Pulisic | AC Milan |
| MF | (Nigeria) Ademola Lookman | Atalanta |
| MF | (Italy) Mattia Zaccagni | Lazio |
| MF | (Netherlands) Tijjani Reijnders | AC Milan |
| MF | (Italy) Riccardo Orsolini | Bologna |
| MF | (Scotland) Scott McTominay | Napoli |
| MF | (Italy) Nicolò Barella | Inter Milan |
| FW | (Italy) Mateo Retegui | Atalanta |
| FW | (Italy) Moise Kean | Fiorentina |
| FW | (Belgium) Romelu Lukaku | Napoli |
| FW | (France) Marcus Thuram | Inter Milan |
| FW | (Scotland) Ché Adams | Torino |

AIC Serie A Team of the Year
| Goalkeeper | (Serbia) Mile Svilar (Roma) | | | |
| Defence | (Netherlands) Denzel Dumfries (Inter Milan) | (Kosovo) Amir Rrahmani (Napoli) | (Italy) Alessandro Bastoni (Inter Milan) | (Italy) Federico Dimarco (Inter Milan) |
| Midfield | (Italy) Nicolò Barella (Inter Milan) | (Netherlands) Tijjani Reijnders (AC Milan) | | (Scotland) Scott McTominay (Napoli) |
| Attack | (Argentina) Lautaro Martínez (Inter Milan) | (Italy) Mateo Retegui (Atalanta) | | (Italy) Moise Kean (Fiorentina) |

== Attendances ==
AC Milan drew the highest average home attendance in the 2024-25 edition of the Serie A.

| # | Football club | Home games | Average attendance |
|---|---|---|---|
| 1 | AC Milan | 19 | 71,544 |
| 2 | Internazionale | 19 | 70,129 |
| 3 | AS Roma | 19 | 62,435 |
| 4 | SSC Napoli | 19 | 50,989 |
| 5 | SS Lazio | 19 | 44,786 |
| 6 | Juventus | 19 | 40,237 |
| 7 | Genoa CFC | 19 | 29,898 |
| 8 | Bologna FC | 19 | 28,007 |
| 9 | US Lecce | 19 | 26,007 |
| 10 | Hellas Verona | 19 | 24,882 |
| 11 | Torino FC | 19 | 22,947 |
| 12 | Atalanta BC | 19 | 22,700 |
| 13 | Udinese | 19 | 21,834 |
| 14 | Fiorentina | 19 | 20,390 |
| 15 | Parma Calcio | 19 | 19,153 |
| 16 | Cagliari Calcio | 19 | 16,076 |
| 17 | Empoli FC | 19 | 11,184 |
| 18 | AC Monza | 19 | 10,983 |
| 19 | Venezia FC | 19 | 10,521 |
| 20 | Como 1907 | 19 | 10,337 |
