= 2023–24 Serie A =

122nd season of top-tier Italian football

Serie A
- Season: 2023–24
- Dates: 19 August 2023 – 2 June 2024
- Champions: Inter Milan; 20th title
- Relegated: Frosinone; Sassuolo; Salernitana
- Champions League: Inter Milan; AC Milan; Juventus; Atalanta; Bologna
- Europa League: Roma; Lazio
- Conference League: Fiorentina
- Matches: 380
- Goals: 992 (2.61 per match)
- Top goalscorer: Lautaro Martínez (24 goals)
- Biggest home win: Roma 7–0 Empoli (17 September 2023)
- Biggest away win: Sassuolo 1–6 Napoli (28 February 2024); Frosinone 0–5 Inter Milan (10 May 2024)
- Highest scoring: Roma 7–0 Empoli (17 September 2023); Cagliari 4–3 Frosinone (29 October 2023); Empoli 3–4 Sassuolo (26 November 2023); Sassuolo 1–6 Napoli (28 February 2024)
- Longest winning run: Inter Milan (10 matches)
- Longest unbeaten run: Inter Milan (28 matches)
- Longest winless run: Salernitana (20 matches)
- Longest losing run: Empoli; Hellas Verona (5 matches)
- Highest attendance: 75,676; AC Milan 0–1 Juventus (22 October 2023)
- Lowest attendance: 7,128; Empoli 0–0 Udinese (6 October 2023)
- Total attendance: 11,729,280
- Average attendance: 30,867

The 2023–24 Serie A (known as the Serie A TIM and Serie A Made in Italy for sponsorship reasons domestically and abroad, respectively) was the 122nd season of top-tier Italian football, the 92nd in a round-robin tournament, and the 14th since its organization under an own league committee, the Lega Serie A. Inter Milan won the title with five matches remaining after securing a 2–1 victory over city rivals AC Milan on 22 April 2024 in the iconic Derby della Madonnina.

Inter Milan's title was their 20th league title in club history, thus granting them the right to add a second golden star to their crest, symbolizing twenty league championships. Napoli were the defending champions, having won their third title in the previous season. Napoli finished the season in 10th place — the lowest finish for a defending Serie A champion since AC Milan in the 1996–97 season.

== Teams ==
Frosinone returned to the Serie A after a four-year absence, while both Genoa and Cagliari earned promotions just one year after being relegated.

Spezia was relegated to the Serie B after three years, while Cremonese was relegated after just one. Sampdoria was relegated after 11 years, ending a club record for consecutive years spent in the Serie A.

=== Team changes ===
Promoted from 2022–23 Serie B	Relegated from 2022–23 Serie A
Frosinone	Spezia
Genoa	Cremonese
Cagliari	Sampdoria

Locations of the 2023–24 Serie A teams

=== Stadiums and locations ===
Team	Location	Stadium	Capacity
Atalanta	Bergamo	Gewiss Stadium	15,222
Bologna	Bologna	Stadio Renato Dall'Ara	36,532
Cagliari	Cagliari	Unipol Domus	16,412
Empoli	Empoli	Stadio Carlo Castellani	16,167
Fiorentina	Florence	Stadio Artemio Franchi	43,118
Frosinone	Frosinone	Stadio Benito Stirpe	16,227
Genoa	Genoa	Stadio Luigi Ferraris	33,205
Hellas Verona	Verona	Stadio Marcantonio Bentegodi	31,713
Inter Milan	Milan	Giuseppe Meazza	75,710
Juventus	Turin	Juventus Stadium	41,507
Lazio	Rome	Stadio Olimpico	67,585
Lecce	Lecce	Stadio Via del mare	30,354
AC Milan	Milan	San Siro	75,710
Monza	Monza	Stadio Brianteo	15,039
Napoli	Naples	Stadio Diego Armando Maradona	54,732
Roma	Rome	Stadio Olimpico	67,585
Salernitana	Salerno	Stadio Arechi	29,739
Sassuolo	Sassuolo	Mapei Stadium – Città del Tricolore	21,515
Torino	Turin	Stadio Olimpico Grande Torino	28,177
Udinese	Udine	Stadio Friuli	25,132

=== Personnel and kits ===
Team	Chairman	Manager	Captain	Kit manufacturer	Shirt sponsor(s)	
Team	Chairman	Manager	Captain	Kit manufacturer	Main	Other
Atalanta	(Italy) Antonio Percassi	(Italy) Gian Piero Gasperini	(Italy) Rafael Tolói	Joma	Paramount+ (in cup and UEFA matches)	Front: Radici Group; Back: Gewiss; Sleeves: Radici Group (in cup and UEFA matches)
Bologna	(Canada) Joey Saputo	(Italy) Thiago Motta	(Scotland) Lewis Ferguson	Macron	Saputo Inc.	Back: Selenella; Sleeves: Lavoropiù
Cagliari	(Italy) Tommaso Giulini	(Italy) Claudio Ranieri	(Italy) Leonardo Pavoletti	EYE Sport	Sardegna	Front: Moby Lines; Back: Ichnusa; Sleeves: Latte Arborea
Empoli	(Italy) Fabrizio Corsi	(Italy) Davide Nicola	(Italy) Sebastiano Luperto	Kappa	Computer Gross	Front: Saint-Gobain; Back: Pediatrica; Sleeves: Sammontana
Fiorentina	(Italy) Rocco Commisso	(Italy) Vincenzo Italiano	(Italy) Cristiano Biraghi	Kappa	Mediacom	Back: Holding Lamioni
Frosinone	(Italy) Maurizio Stirpe	(Italy) Eusebio Di Francesco	(Italy) Luca Mazzitelli	Zeus	MeglioBanca	Front: Acqua Fiuggi; Back: Supermercati Dem; Sleeves: Orsolini Amedeo
Genoa	(Italy) Alberto Zangrillo	(Italy) Alberto Gilardino	(Croatia) Milan Badelj	Kappa	Pulsee Luce e Gas	Front: MSC Cruises; Back: LeasePlan (H)/ALD Automotive (A)/Ayvens; Sleeves: Radio 105
Hellas Verona	(Italy) Maurizio Setti	(Italy) Marco Baroni	(Serbia) Darko Lazović	Joma	Sinergy Luce e Gas	Front: Conforama; Back: VetroCar; Sleeves: Drivalia
Inter Milan	(China) Steven Zhang	(Italy) Simone Inzaghi	(Argentina) Lautaro Martínez	Nike	Paramount+	Back: U-Power; Sleeves: eBay
Juventus	(Italy) Gianluca Ferrero	(Uruguay) Paolo Montero (caretaker)	(Brazil) Danilo	Adidas	Jeep	Back: Cygames; Sleeves: zondacrypto
Lazio	(Italy) Claudio Lotito	(Croatia) Igor Tudor	(Italy) Ciro Immobile	Mizuno	Clinica Paideia	Sleeves: AeroItalia
Lecce	(Italy) Saverio Sticchi Damiani	(Italy) Luca Gotti	(France) Alexis Blin	M908	DEGHI	Front: BetItaly Pay; Back: DR Automobiles; Sleeves: Banca Popolare Pugliese
AC Milan	(Italy) Paolo Scaroni	(Italy) Stefano Pioli	(Italy) Davide Calabria	Puma	Emirates	Back: wefox; Sleeves: MSC Cruises
Monza	(Italy) Paolo Berlusconi	(Italy) Raffaele Palladino	(Italy) Matteo Pessina	Lotto	Motorola	Front: U-Power; Back: Pulsee Luce e Gas; Sleeves: Dell'Orto
Napoli	(Italy) Aurelio De Laurentiis	(Italy) Francesco Calzona	(Italy) Giovanni Di Lorenzo	EA7	MSC Cruises	Back: Upbit; Sleeves: eBay
Roma	(United States) Dan Friedkin	(Italy) Daniele De Rossi	(Italy) Lorenzo Pellegrini	Adidas	Riyadh Season	Back: Auberge Resorts
Salernitana	(Italy) Danilo Iervolino	(Italy) Stefano Colantuono	(Argentina) Federico Fazio	Zeus	Civitus Assicurazioni/Dianflex/Forbes Italia (in cup matches)	Front: Vincitunews; Back: eCampus Università; Sleeves: Dianflex/Forbes Italia
Sassuolo	(Italy) Carlo Rossi	(Italy) Davide Ballardini	(Italy) Gian Marco Ferrari	Puma	Mapei	None
Torino	(Italy) Urbano Cairo	(Croatia) Ivan Jurić	(Switzerland) Ricardo Rodriguez	Joma	Suzuki	Front: Fratelli Beretta; Back: EdiliziAcrobatica; Sleeves: JD Sports
Udinese	(Italy) Franco Soldati	(Italy) Fabio Cannavaro	(Argentina) Roberto Pereyra	Macron	Io sono Friuli Venezia Giulia	Front: Prestipay; Back: Bluenergy; Sleeves: Prosciutto di San Daniele

=== Managerial changes ===
Team	Outgoing manager	Manner of departure	Date of vacancy	Position in table	Replaced by	Date of appointment
Napoli	(Italy) Luciano Spalletti	Resigned	1 July 2023	Pre-season	(France) Rudi Garcia	1 July 2023
Frosinone	(Italy) Fabio Grosso	End of contract	1 July 2023	Pre-season	(Italy) Eusebio Di Francesco	1 July 2023
Lecce	(Italy) Marco Baroni	End of contract	1 July 2023	Pre-season	(Italy) Roberto D'Aversa	1 July 2023
Hellas Verona	(Italy) Marco Zaffaroni	End of contract	1 July 2023	Pre-season	(Italy) Marco Baroni	1 July 2023
Empoli	(Italy) Paolo Zanetti	Sacked	19 September 2023	20th	(Italy) Aurelio Andreazzoli	19 September 2023
Salernitana	(Portugal) Paulo Sousa	Sacked	10 October 2023	19th	(Italy) Filippo Inzaghi	10 October 2023
Udinese	(Italy) Andrea Sottil	Sacked	24 October 2023	18th	(Italy) Gabriele Cioffi	25 October 2023
Napoli	(France) Rudi Garcia	Sacked	14 November 2023	4th	(Italy) Walter Mazzarri	14 November 2023
Empoli	(Italy) Aurelio Andreazzoli	Sacked	15 January 2024	19th	(Italy) Davide Nicola	15 January 2024
Roma	(Portugal) José Mourinho	Sacked	16 January 2024	9th	(Italy) Daniele De Rossi	16 January 2024
Salernitana	(Italy) Filippo Inzaghi	Sacked	11 February 2024	20th	(Italy) Fabio Liverani	11 February 2024
Napoli	(Italy) Walter Mazzarri	Sacked	19 February 2024	9th	(Italy) Francesco Calzona	19 February 2024
Sassuolo	(Italy) Alessio Dionisi	Sacked	25 February 2024	18th	(Italy) Emiliano Bigica (caretaker)	25 February 2024
Sassuolo	(Italy) Emiliano Bigica	End of caretaker spell	1 March 2024	18th	(Italy) Davide Ballardini	1 March 2024
Lecce	(Italy) Roberto D'Aversa	Sacked	11 March 2024	15th	(Italy) Luca Gotti	12 March 2024
Lazio	(Italy) Maurizio Sarri	Resigned	12 March 2024	9th	(Italy) Giovanni Martusciello (caretaker)	13 March 2024
Lazio	(Italy) Giovanni Martusciello	End of caretaker spell	18 March 2024	9th	(Croatia) Igor Tudor	18 March 2024
Salernitana	(Italy) Fabio Liverani	Sacked	19 March 2024	20th	(Italy) Stefano Colantuono	19 March 2024
Udinese	(Italy) Gabriele Cioffi	Sacked	22 April 2024	17th	(Italy) Fabio Cannavaro	22 April 2024
Juventus	(Italy) Massimiliano Allegri	Sacked	17 May 2024	4th	(Uruguay) Paolo Montero (caretaker)	18 May 2024

== League table ==
Pos	Team	Pld	W	D	L	GF	GA	GD	Pts	Qualification or relegation
1	Inter Milan (C)	38	29	7	2	89	22	+67	94	Qualification for the Champions League league phase (Note: Serie A gained an additional Champions League place as a result of Italy finishing as one of the two associations with the highest coefficient points in 2023–24.)
2	Milan	38	22	9	7	76	49	+27	75	Qualification for the Champions League league phase
3	Juventus	38	19	14	5	54	31	+23	71	Qualification for the Champions League league phase
4	Atalanta	38	21	6	11	72	42	+30	69	Qualification for the Champions League league phase
5	Bologna	38	18	14	6	54	32	+22	68	Qualification for the Champions League league phase
6	Roma	38	18	9	11	65	46	+19	63	Qualification for the Europa League league phase (Note: Since the winners of the 2023–24 Coppa Italia, Juventus, qualified for the Champions League, the Europa League berth awarded to the Coppa Italia winners was passed to the seventh-placed team, and the Conference League berth was passed to the eighth-placed team.)
7	Lazio	38	18	7	13	49	39	+10	61	Qualification for the Europa League league phase
8	Fiorentina	38	17	9	12	61	46	+15	60	Qualification for the Conference League play-off round
9	Torino	38	13	14	11	36	36	0	53 (Note: Torino finished ahead of Napoli on head-to-head points: Torino 3–0 Napoli, Napoli 1–1 Torino.)	
10	Napoli	38	13	14	11	55	48	+7	53	
11	Genoa	38	12	13	13	45	45	0	49	
12	Monza	38	11	12	15	39	51	−12	45	
13	Hellas Verona	38	9	11	18	38	51	−13	38 (Note: Hellas Verona finished ahead of Lecce on head-to-head points: Hellas Verona 2–2 Lecce, Lecce 0–1 Hellas Verona.)	
14	Lecce	38	8	14	16	32	54	−22	38	
15	Udinese	38	6	19	13	37	53	−16	37	
16	Cagliari	38	8	12	18	42	68	−26	36 (Note: Cagliari finished ahead of Empoli on head-to-head points: Cagliari 0–0 Empoli, Empoli 0–1 Cagliari.)	
17	Empoli	38	9	9	20	29	54	−25	36	
18	Frosinone (R)	38	8	11	19	44	69	−25	35	Relegation to Serie B
19	Sassuolo (R)	38	7	9	22	43	75	−32	30	Relegation to Serie B
20	Salernitana (R)	38	2	11	25	32	81	−49	17	Relegation to Serie B

Source: Serie A
Rules for classification: 1) Points; 2) Tiebreaker for Champions team and third relegated team; 3) Head-to-head points; 4) Head-to-head goal difference; 5) Goal difference; 6) Goals scored; 7) Draw.
(Note: Head-to-head record is used only after all the matches between the teams in question have been played)
(C) Champions; (R) Relegated

== Results ==
Home \ Away	ATA	BOL	CAG	EMP	FIO	FRO	GEN	VER	INT	JUV	LAZ	LEC	MIL	MON	NAP	ROM	SAL	SAS	TOR	UDI
Atalanta	—	1–2	2–0	2–0	2–3	5–0	2–0	2–2	1–2	0–0	3–1	1–0	3–2	3–0	1–2	2–1	4–1	3–0	3–0	2–0
Bologna	1–0	—	2–1	3–0	2–0	2–1	1–1	2–0	0–1	3–3	1–0	4–0	0–2	0–0	0–0	2–0	3–0	4–2	2–0	1–1
Cagliari	2–1	2–1	—	0–0	2–3	4–3	2–1	1–1	0–2	2–2	1–3	1–1	1–3	1–1	1–1	1–4	4–2	2–1	1–2	0–0
Empoli	0–3	0–1	0–1	—	1–1	0–0	0–0	0–1	0–1	0–2	0–2	1–1	0–3	3–0	1–0	2–1	1–0	3–4	3–2	0–0
Fiorentina	3–2	2–1	3–0	0–2	—	5–1	1–1	1–0	0–1	0–1	2–1	2–2	1–2	2–1	2–2	2–2	3–0	5–1	1–0	2–2
Frosinone	2–1	0–0	3–1	2–1	1–1	—	2–1	2–1	0–5	1–2	2–3	1–1	2–3	2–3	1–3	0–3	3–0	4–2	0–0	0–1
Genoa	1–4	2–0	3–0	1–1	1–4	1–1	—	1–0	1–1	1–1	0–1	2–1	0–1	2–3	2–2	4–1	1–0	2–1	0–0	2–0
Hellas Verona	0–1	0–0	2–0	2–1	2–1	1–1	1–2	—	2–2	2–2	1–1	2–2	1–3	1–3	1–3	2–1	0–1	1–0	1–2	1–0
Inter Milan	4–0	2–2	2–2	2–0	4–0	2–0	2–1	2–1	—	1–0	1–1	2–0	5–1	2–0	1–1	1–0	4–0	1–2	2–0	4–0
Juventus	2–2	1–1	2–1	1–1	1–0	3–2	0–0	1–0	1–1	—	3–1	1–0	0–0	2–0	1–0	1–0	1–1	3–0	2–0	0–1
Lazio	3–2	1–2	1–0	2–0	1–0	3–1	0–1	1–0	0–2	1–0	—	1–0	0–1	1–1	0–0	0–0	4–1	1–1	2–0	1–2
Lecce	0–2	1–1	1–1	1–0	3–2	2–1	1–0	0–1	0–4	0–3	2–1	—	2–2	1–1	0–4	0–0	2–0	1–1	0–1	0–2
AC Milan	1–1	2–2	5–1	1–0	1–0	3–1	3–3	1–0	1–2	0–1	2–0	3–0	—	3–0	1–0	3–1	3–3	1–0	4–1	0–1
Monza	1–2	0–0	1–0	2–0	0–1	0–1	1–0	0–0	1–5	1–2	2–2	1–1	4–2	—	2–4	1–4	3–0	1–0	1–1	1–1
Napoli	0–3	0–2	2–1	0–1	1–3	2–2	1–1	2–1	0–3	2–1	1–2	0–0	2–2	0–0	—	2–2	2–1	2–0	1–1	4–1
Roma	1–1	1–3	4–0	7–0	1–1	2–0	1–0	2–1	2–4	1–1	1–0	2–1	1–2	1–0	2–0	—	2–2	1–0	3–2	3–1
Salernitana	1–2	1–2	2–2	1–3	0–2	1–1	1–2	1–2	0–4	1–2	2–1	0–1	2–2	0–2	0–2	1–2	—	2–2	0–3	1–1
Sassuolo	0–2	1–1	0–2	2–3	1–0	1–0	1–2	3–1	1–0	4–2	0–2	0–3	3–3	0–1	1–6	1–2	2–2	—	1–1	1–1
Torino	3–0	0–0	0–0	1–0	0–0	0–0	1–0	0–0	0–3	0–0	0–2	2–0	3–1	1–0	3–0	1–1	0–0	2–1	—	1–1
Udinese	1–1	3–0	1–1	1–1	0–2	0–0	2–2	3–3	1–2	0–3	1–2	1–1	2–3	0–0	1–1	1–2	1–1	2–2	0–2	—

Source: Serie A
Legend: Blue = home team win; Yellow = draw; Red = away team win.
For upcoming matches, an "a" indicates there is an article about the rivalry between the two participants.

== Season statistics ==
=== Top goalscorers ===
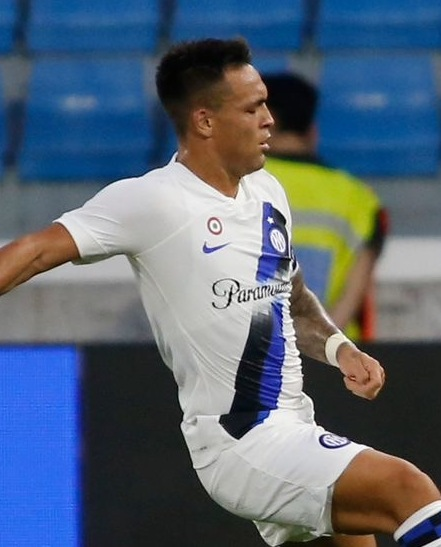
Inter's Lautaro Martínez was the season's top scorer with 24 goals.

Rank	Player	Club	Goals
1	(Argentina) Lautaro Martínez	Inter Milan	24
2	(Serbia) Dušan Vlahović	Juventus	16
3	(France) Olivier Giroud	AC Milan	15
3	(Nigeria) Victor Osimhen	Napoli	15
5	(Iceland) Albert Guðmundsson	Genoa	14
6	(Turkey) Hakan Çalhanoğlu	Inter Milan	13
6	(Argentina) Paulo Dybala	Roma	13
6	(Belgium) Romelu Lukaku	Roma	13
6	(France) Marcus Thuram	Inter Milan	13
6	(Colombia) Duván Zapata	Atalanta / Torino^{1}	13

^{1} Zapata played for Atalanta until matchday 2 and scored 1 goal.

=== Hat-tricks ===
Player	Club	Against	Result	Date
(Argentina) Lautaro Martínez^{4}	Inter Milan	Salernitana	4–0 (A)	30 September 2023
(Italy) Riccardo Orsolini	Bologna	Empoli	3–0 (H)	1 October 2023
(Poland) Szymon Żurkowski	Empoli	Monza	3–0 (H)	21 January 2024
(Argentina) Paulo Dybala	Roma	Torino	3–2 (H)	26 February 2024
(Nigeria) Victor Osimhen	Napoli	Sassuolo	6–1 (A)	28 February 2024

Notes

^{4} Player scored 4 goals
(H) – Home team
(A) – Away team

=== Clean sheets ===
Rank	Player	Club	Clean sheets
1	(Switzerland) Yann Sommer	Inter Milan	19
2	(Serbia) Vanja Milinković-Savić	Torino	18
3	(Poland) Wojciech Szczęsny	Juventus	15
4	(Poland) Łukasz Skorupski	Bologna	13
5	(Italy) Michele Di Gregorio	Monza	12
6	(France) Mike Maignan	AC Milan	11
7	(Italy) Marco Carnesecchi	Atalanta	9
7	(Italy) Ivan Provedel	Lazio	9
9	(Spain) Josep Martínez	Genoa	8
9	(Italy) Lorenzo Montipò	Hellas Verona	8
9	(Italy) Pietro Terracciano	Fiorentina	8

=== Discipline ===
==== Player ====
- Most yellow cards: 15
  - (Argentina) Leandro Paredes (Roma)
- Most red cards: 2
  - (Italy) Davide Calabria (AC Milan)
  - (Slovakia) Ondrej Duda (Hellas Verona)
  - (France) Thomas Henry (Hellas Verona)
  - (Republic of the Congo) Antoine Makoumbou (Cagliari)

==== Club ====
- Most yellow cards: 97
  - Lazio
- Most red cards: 8
  - AC Milan
- Fewest yellow cards: 46
  - Inter Milan
- Fewest red cards: 0
  - Fiorentina

== Awards ==
=== Monthly awards ===
Month	Player of the Month		Coach of the Month		Goal of the Month	
Month	Player	Club	Coach	Club	Player	Club
August	—N/a		(Italy) Roberto D'Aversa	Lecce	—N/a	
September	(Portugal) Rafael Leão	AC Milan	(Italy) Alessio Dionisi	Sassuolo	(France) Marcus Thuram	Inter Milan
October	(Argentina) Lautaro Martínez	Inter Milan	(Italy) Simone Inzaghi	Inter Milan	(Italy) Gianluca Scamacca	Atalanta
November	(Argentina) Paulo Dybala	Roma	(Italy) Massimiliano Allegri	Juventus	(Italy) Federico Dimarco	Inter Milan
December	(United States) Christian Pulisic	AC Milan	(Italy) Vincenzo Italiano	Fiorentina	(Belgium) Cyril Ngonge	Hellas Verona
January	(Serbia) Dušan Vlahović	Juventus	(Italy) Simone Inzaghi	Inter Milan	(Italy) Antonio Candreva	Salernitana
February	(Argentina) Paulo Dybala	Roma	(Italy) Thiago Motta	Bologna	(Italy) Michael Folorunsho	Hellas Verona
March	(Italy) Alessandro Bastoni	Inter Milan	(Italy) Thiago Motta	Bologna	(Portugal) Dany Mota	Monza
April	(Argentina) Paulo Dybala	Roma	(Italy) Simone Inzaghi	Inter Milan	(Italy) Matteo Politano	Napoli
May	(Italy) Riccardo Calafiori	Bologna	(Italy) Gian Piero Gasperini	Atalanta	(Georgia (country)) Khvicha Kvaratskhelia	Napoli

=== Seasonal awards ===
Award	Winner	Club	Ref.
Most Valuable Player	(Argentina) Lautaro Martínez	Inter Milan	
Best Under-23	(Netherlands) Joshua Zirkzee	Bologna	
Best Goalkeeper	(Italy) Michele Di Gregorio	Monza	
Best Defender	(Italy) Alessandro Bastoni	Inter Milan	
Best Midfielder	(Turkey) Hakan Çalhanoğlu	Inter Milan	
Best Striker	(Serbia) Dušan Vlahović	Juventus	
Coach of the Season	(Italy) Simone Inzaghi	Inter Milan	
Goal of the Season	(Portugal) Dany Mota	Monza	
Fair Play Moment	(Italy) Alessandro Florenzi	AC Milan	

Team of the Season
Pos.	Player	Club
GK	(Switzerland) Yann Sommer	Inter Milan
DF	(Italy) Alessandro Bastoni	Inter Milan
DF	(Brazil) Bremer	Juventus
DF	(Italy) Riccardo Calafiori	Bologna
DF	(Italy) Federico Dimarco	Inter Milan
DF	(France) Théo Hernandez	AC Milan
MF	(Turkey) Hakan Çalhanoğlu	Inter Milan
MF	(Scotland) Lewis Ferguson	Bologna
MF	(Italy) Lorenzo Pellegrini	Roma
MF	(United States) Christian Pulisic	AC Milan
FW	(Argentina) Paulo Dybala	Roma
FW	(France) Olivier Giroud	AC Milan
FW	(Portugal) Rafael Leão	AC Milan
FW	(Argentina) Lautaro Martínez	Inter Milan
FW	(Serbia) Dušan Vlahović	Juventus

AIC Serie A Team of the Year
Goalkeeper	(Switzerland) Yann Sommer (Inter Milan)			
Defence	(Italy) Raoul Bellanova (Torino)	(Italy) Alessandro Bastoni (Inter Milan)	(Italy) Riccardo Calafiori (Bologna)	(Italy) Federico Dimarco (Inter Milan)
Midfield	(Italy) Nicolò Barella (Inter Milan)	(Turkey) Hakan Çalhanoğlu (Inter Milan)		(Netherlands) Teun Koopmeiners (Atalanta)
Attack	(Argentina) Lautaro Martínez (Inter Milan)	(Netherlands) Joshua Zirkzee (Bologna)		(France) Marcus Thuram (Inter Milan)

== Attendances ==
Inter Milan drew the highest average home attendance in the 2023-24 edition of the Serie A.

#	Football club	Home games	Average attendance
1	Inter Milan	19	72,838
2	AC Milan	19	72,008
3	AS Roma	19	62,970
4	SSC Napoli	19	46,814
5	SS Lazio	19	44,853
6	Juventus	19	39,575
7	Genoa CFC	19	31,934
8	Fiorentina	19	28,807
9	US Lecce	19	26,645
10	Bologna FC	19	25,914
11	Torino FC	19	22,737
12	Udinese	19	21,550
13	Hellas Verona	19	21,369
14	Salernitana	19	18,173
15	Cagliari Calcio	19	16,167
16	Atalanta BC	19	14,725
17	Frosinone Calcio	19	14,650
18	US Sassuolo	19	14,578
19	AC Monza	19	12,173
20	Empoli FC	19	10,861
