= 2020–21 Serie A =

119th season of top-tier Italian football

Serie A
- Season: 2020–21
- Dates: 19 September 2020 – 23 May 2021
- Champions: Inter Milan; 19th title
- Relegated: Benevento; Crotone; Parma
- Champions League: Inter Milan; AC Milan; Atalanta; Juventus
- Europa League: Napoli; Lazio
- Europa Conference League: Roma
- Matches: 380
- Goals: 1,163 (3.06 per match)
- Top goalscorer: Cristiano Ronaldo (29 goals)
- Biggest home win: Napoli 6–0 Genoa (27 September 2020); Napoli 6–0 Fiorentina (17 January 2021)
- Biggest away win: Torino 0–7 AC Milan (12 May 2021)
- Highest scoring: Inter Milan 6–2 Crotone (3 January 2021); Lazio 5–3 Benevento (18 April 2021)
- Longest winning run: Inter Milan (11 matches)
- Longest unbeaten run: Inter Milan (20 matches)
- Longest winless run: Parma (17 matches)
- Longest losing run: Parma (9 matches)

The 2020–21 Serie A (known as the Serie A TIM for sponsorship reasons) was the 119th season of top-tier Italian football, the 89th in a round-robin tournament, and the 11th since its organization under an own league committee, the Lega Serie A. Inter Milan won the title with four matches remaining after second-placed Atalanta drew against Sassuolo.

Inter Milan's title was their 19th in club history and their first in 11 years. It ended Juventus's run of nine consecutive league titles, as they finished in fourth place, 13 points behind Inter Milan.

== Teams ==
Benevento and Crotone were the two teams directly promoted from Serie B—both after a two-year absence.

On 20 August 2020, Spezia won a playoff match to earn their first promotion to Serie A; they became the 66th team to participate in the Italian top-tier league.

=== Impact of the COVID-19 Pandemic ===
A day following the Napoli–Genoa match on 27 September 2020, Genoa announced that 14 of their players tested positive for COVID-19. The Genoa–Torino match scheduled for 3 October 2020 was thereby postponed.

On 3 October 2020, two Napoli players, Piotr Zieliński and Eljif Elmas, tested positive for COVID-19, and after being denied authorization to leave Naples by the Local Health Authority (ASL), Napoli blocked their players' departure for their match in Turin against Juventus. The league decided not to postpone the match scheduled for 4 October 2020. On the day of the game, Juventus took to the field despite the absence of their opponents, who were quarantining in Naples. Juventus were awarded a 3–0 victory by default and Napoli were docked one point as the Disciplinary Commission ruled Napoli did not follow the country's COVID-19 pandemic protocol. Following a successful appeal by Napoli to the CONI Sports Guarantee Board, these penalties were overturned on 22 December 2020. The match was eventually recovered on 7 April 2021, more than six months after its originally scheduled date.

=== Team changes ===
Promoted from 2019–20 Serie B	Relegated from 2019–20 Serie A
Benevento	Lecce
Crotone	Brescia
Spezia	SPAL

=== Stadiums and locations ===
Locations of the 2020–21 Serie A teams

Team	Home city	Stadium	Capacity
Atalanta	Bergamo	Gewiss Stadium	25,000
Benevento	Benevento	Stadio Ciro Vigorito	16,867
Bologna	Bologna	Stadio Renato Dall'Ara	36,462
Cagliari	Cagliari	Sardegna Arena	16,416
Crotone	Crotone	Stadio Ezio Scida	16,640
Fiorentina	Florence	Stadio Artemio Franchi	45,000
Genoa	Genoa	Stadio Luigi Ferraris	36,600
Hellas Verona	Verona	Stadio Marcantonio Bentegodi	39,371
Inter Milan	Milan	San Siro	75,923
Juventus	Turin	Allianz Stadium	41,507
Lazio	Rome	Stadio Olimpico	70,634
AC Milan	Milan	San Siro	75,923
Napoli	Naples	Stadio San Paolo	54,726
Parma	Parma	Stadio Ennio Tardini	27,906
Roma	Rome	Stadio Olimpico	70,634
Sampdoria	Genoa	Stadio Luigi Ferraris	36,599
Sassuolo	Sassuolo	Mapei Stadium	23,717
Spezia	La Spezia	Stadio Alberto Picco (Note: Spezia played the first 11 matches of the season in the Stadio Dino Manuzzi of Cesena, while works were being finished at their ground Stadio Alberto Picco.)	10,336
Torino	Turin	Stadio Olimpico Grande Torino	27,958
Udinese	Udine	Stadio Friuli	25,144

=== Personnel and kits ===
Team	Head coach	Captain	Kit manufacturer	Shirt sponsor(s)	
Team	Head coach	Captain	Kit manufacturer	Main	Other
Atalanta	(Italy) Gian Piero Gasperini	(Italy) Rafael Tolói	Joma	Plus500	Front: Radici Group; Back: Gewiss; Sleeves: Automha
Benevento	(Italy) Filippo Inzaghi	(Italy) Nicolas Viola	Kappa	IVPC	Front: Rillo Costruzioni; Back: Pastificio Rummo; Sleeves: Don Peppe
Bologna	(Serbia) Siniša Mihajlović	(Italy) Andrea Poli	Macron	Facile Ristrutturare	Front: Selenella; Back: Illumia; Sleeves: Scala
Cagliari	(Italy) Leonardo Semplici	(Brazil) João Pedro	Adidas	ISOLA Artigianato di Sardegna	Front: Ichnusa; Back: Tiscali; Sleeves: Latte Arborea
Crotone	(Italy) Serse Cosmi	(Italy) Alex Cordaz	Zeus	San Vincenzo Salumi	Front: Envì Group; Back: Biemme Finestre; Sleeves: Ford Vumbaca Group
Fiorentina	(Italy) Giuseppe Iachini	(Argentina) Germán Pezzella	Kappa	Mediacom	Back: Prima.it; Sleeves: Estra
Genoa	(Italy) Davide Ballardini	(Italy) Domenico Criscito	Kappa	Banca Sistema	Back: Leaseplan; Sleeves: Synlab
Hellas Verona	(Croatia) Ivan Jurić	(Portugal) Miguel Veloso	Macron	Gruppo Sinergy	Front: Winelivery; Back: Scaligera Arredamenti/SEC/Manila Grace/VetroCar; Sleeves: Mercedes-Benz Trivellato Industriali
Inter Milan	(Italy) Antonio Conte	(Slovenia) Samir Handanović	Nike	Pirelli	Back: Driver
Juventus	(Italy) Andrea Pirlo	(Italy) Giorgio Chiellini	Adidas	Jeep	Back: Cygames
Lazio	(Italy) Simone Inzaghi	(Bosnia and Herzegovina) Senad Lulić	Macron	World Food Programme / Contrader / Clinica Paideia	Back: Contrader; Sleeves: Frecciarossa
AC Milan	(Italy) Stefano Pioli	(Italy) Alessio Romagnoli	Puma	Emirates	None
Napoli	(Italy) Gennaro Gattuso	(Italy) Lorenzo Insigne	Kappa	Lete	Front: MSC Cruises; Back: Kimbo Caffè
Parma	(Italy) Roberto D'Aversa	(Portugal) Bruno Alves	Erreà	Cetilar	Front: Old Wild West; Back: Viva la Mamma Beretta; Sleeves: Canovi Coperture
Roma	(Portugal) Paulo Fonseca	(Italy) Lorenzo Pellegrini	Nike	Qatar Airways	Back: Hyundai; Sleeves: Iqoniq
Sampdoria	(Italy) Claudio Ranieri	(Italy) Fabio Quagliarella	Macron	Very Mobile	Back: IBSA Group
Sassuolo	(Italy) Roberto De Zerbi	(Italy) Francesco Magnanelli	Puma	Mapei	None
Spezia	(Italy) Vincenzo Italiano	(Italy) Claudio Terzi	Acerbis	TEN Food & Beverage	Back: Pediatrica; Sleeves: Iozzelli Piscine
Torino	(Italy) Davide Nicola	(Italy) Andrea Belotti	Joma	Suzuki/Suzuki Hybrid (T)	Front: Fratelli Beretta; Back: Edilizia Acrobatica; Sleeves: N° 38 Wüber
Udinese	(Italy) Luca Gotti	(Argentina) Rodrigo De Paul	Macron	Dacia	Front: Vortice; Back: Bluenergy; Sleeves: Prosciutto di San Daniele

=== Managerial changes ===
Team	Outgoing manager	Manner of departure	Date of vacancy	Position in table	Replaced by	Date of appointment
Cagliari	(Italy) Walter Zenga	End of contract	2 August 2020	Pre-season	(Italy) Eusebio Di Francesco	3 August 2020
Torino	(Italy) Moreno Longo	End of contract	2 August 2020	Pre-season	(Italy) Marco Giampaolo	7 August 2020
Juventus	(Italy) Maurizio Sarri	Sacked	8 August 2020	Pre-season	(Italy) Andrea Pirlo	8 August 2020
Parma	(Italy) Roberto D'Aversa	Sacked	23 August 2020	Pre-season	(Italy) Fabio Liverani	28 August 2020
Genoa	(Italy) Davide Nicola	Sacked	26 August 2020	Pre-season	(Italy) Rolando Maran	26 August 2020
Fiorentina	(Italy) Giuseppe Iachini	Sacked	9 November 2020	12th	(Italy) Cesare Prandelli	9 November 2020
Genoa	(Italy) Rolando Maran	Sacked	21 December 2020	19th	(Italy) Davide Ballardini	21 December 2020
Parma	(Italy) Fabio Liverani	Sacked	7 January 2021	18th	(Italy) Roberto D'Aversa	7 January 2021
Torino	(Italy) Marco Giampaolo	Sacked	18 January 2021	18th	(Italy) Davide Nicola	19 January 2021
Cagliari	(Italy) Eusebio Di Francesco	Sacked	22 February 2021	18th	(Italy) Leonardo Semplici	22 February 2021
Crotone	(Italy) Giovanni Stroppa	Sacked	1 March 2021	20th	(Italy) Serse Cosmi	1 March 2021
Fiorentina	(Italy) Cesare Prandelli	Resigned	23 March 2021	14th	(Italy) Giuseppe Iachini	24 March 2021

== League table ==
Pos	Team	Pld	W	D	L	GF	GA	GD	Pts	Qualification or relegation
1	Inter Milan (C)	38	28	7	3	89	35	+54	91	Qualification for Champions League group stage
2	Milan	38	24	7	7	74	41	+33	79	Qualification for Champions League group stage
3	Atalanta	38	23	9	6	90	47	+43	78 (Note: Atalanta finished ahead of Juventus on head-to-head points: Juventus 1–1 Atalanta, Atalanta 1–0 Juventus.)	Qualification for Champions League group stage
4	Juventus	38	23	9	6	77	38	+39	78	Qualification for Champions League group stage
5	Napoli	38	24	5	9	86	41	+45	77	Qualification for Europa League group stage (Note: Since the winners of the 2020–21 Coppa Italia, Juventus, qualified for the Champions League, the Europa League berth awarded to the Coppa Italia winners was passed to the sixth-placed team, and the Europa Conference League berth awarded to the sixth-placed team was passed to the seventh-placed team.)
6	Lazio	38	21	5	12	61	55	+6	68	Qualification for Europa League group stage
7	Roma	38	18	8	12	68	58	+10	62	Qualification for Conference League play-off round
8	Sassuolo	38	17	11	10	64	56	+8	62	
9	Sampdoria	38	15	7	16	52	54	−2	52	
10	Hellas Verona	38	11	12	15	46	48	−2	45	
11	Genoa	38	10	12	16	47	58	−11	42	
12	Bologna	38	10	11	17	51	65	−14	41	
13	Fiorentina	38	9	13	16	47	59	−12	40	
14	Udinese	38	10	10	18	42	58	−16	40	
15	Spezia	38	9	12	17	52	72	−20	39	
16	Cagliari	38	9	10	19	43	59	−16	37	
17	Torino	38	7	16	15	50	69	−19	37	
18	Benevento (R)	38	7	12	19	40	75	−35	33	Relegation to Serie B
19	Crotone (R)	38	6	5	27	45	92	−47	23	Relegation to Serie B
20	Parma (R)	38	3	11	24	39	83	−44	20	Relegation to Serie B

Source: Serie A, Soccerway
Rules for classification: 1) Points; 2) Head-to-head points; 3) Head-to-head goal difference; 4) Goal difference; 5) Goals scored; 6) Draw. (Note: Head-to-head record is used only after all the matches between the teams in question have been played)
(C) Champions; (R) Relegated

== Results ==
*Internazionale = Inter Milan, Milan = AC Milan*

Home \ Away	ATA	BEN	BOL	CAG	CRO	FIO	GEN	HEL	INT	JUV	LAZ	MIL	NAP	PAR	ROM	SAM	SAS	SPE	TOR	UDI
Atalanta	—	2–0	5–0	5–2	5–1	3–0	0–0	0–2	1–1	1–0	1–3	0–2	4–2	3–0	4–1	1–3	5–1	3–1	3–3	3–2
Benevento	1–4	—	1–0	1–3	1–1	1–4	2–0	0–3	2–5	1–1	1–1	0–2	1–2	2–2	0–0	1–1	0–1	0–3	2–2	2–4
Bologna	2–2	1–1	—	3–2	1–0	3–3	0–2	1–0	0–1	1–4	2–0	1–2	0–1	4–1	1–5	3–1	3–4	4–1	1–1	2–2
Cagliari	0–1	1–2	1–0	—	4–2	0–0	0–1	0–2	1–3	1–3	0–2	0–2	1–4	4–3	3–2	2–0	1–1	2–2	0–1	1–1
Crotone	1–2	4–1	2–3	0–2	—	0–0	0–3	2–1	0–2	1–1	0–2	0–2	0–4	2–1	1–3	0–1	1–2	4–1	4–2	1–2
Fiorentina	2–3	0–1	0–0	1–0	2–1	—	1–1	1–1	0–2	1–1	2–0	2–3	0–2	3–3	1–2	1–2	1–1	3–0	1–0	3–2
Genoa	3–4	2–2	2–0	1–0	4–1	1–1	—	2–2	0–2	1–3	1–1	2–2	2–1	1–2	1–3	1–1	1–2	2–0	1–2	1–1
Hellas Verona	0–2	3–1	2–2	1–1	2–1	1–2	0–0	—	1–2	1–1	0–1	0–2	3–1	2–1	3–0	1–2	0–2	1–1	1–1	1–0
Internazionale	1–0	4–0	3–1	1–0	6–2	4–3	3–0	1–0	—	2–0	3–1	1–2	1–0	2–2	3–1	5–1	2–1	2–1	4–2	5–1
Juventus	1–1	0–1	2–0	2–0	3–0	0–3	3–1	1–1	3–2	—	3–1	0–3	2–1	3–1	2–0	3–0	3–1	3–0	2–1	4–1
Lazio	1–4	5–3	2–1	1–0	3–2	2–1	4–3	1–2	1–1	1–1	—	3–0	2–0	1–0	3–0	1–0	2–1	2–1	0–0	1–3
Milan	0–3	2–0	2–0	0–0	4–0	2–0	2–1	2–2	0–3	1–3	3–2	—	0–1	2–2	3–3	1–1	1–2	3–0	2–0	1–1
Napoli	4–1	2–0	3–1	1–1	4–3	6–0	6–0	1–1	1–1	1–0	5–2	1–3	—	2–0	4–0	2–1	0–2	1–2	1–1	5–1
Parma	2–5	0–0	0–3	0–0	3–4	0–0	1–2	1–0	1–2	0–4	0–2	1–3	0–2	—	2–0	0–2	1–3	2–2	0–3	2–2
Roma	1–1	5–2	1–0	3–2	5–0	2–0	1–0	3–1	2–2	2–2	2–0	1–2	0–2	3–0	—	1–0	0–0	4–3	3–1	3–0
Sampdoria	0–2	2–3	1–2	2–2	3–1	2–1	1–1	3–1	2–1	0–2	3–0	1–2	0–2	3–0	2–0	—	2–3	2–2	1–0	2–1
Sassuolo	1–1	1–0	1–1	1–1	4–1	3–1	2–1	3–2	0–3	1–3	2–0	1–2	3–3	1–1	2–2	1–0	—	1–2	3–3	0–0
Spezia	0–0	1–1	2–2	2–1	3–2	2–2	1–2	0–1	1–1	1–4	1–2	2–0	1–4	2–2	2–2	2–1	1–4	—	4–1	0–1
Torino	2–4	1–1	1–1	2–3	0–0	1–1	0–0	1–1	1–2	2–2	3–4	0–7	0–2	1–0	3–1	2–2	3–2	0–0	—	2–3
Udinese	1–1	0–2	1–1	0–1	0–0	1–0	1–0	2–0	0–0	1–2	0–1	1–2	1–2	3–2	0–1	0–1	2–0	0–2	0–1	—

Source: Serie A
Legend: Blue = home team win; Yellow = draw; Red = away team win.
For upcoming matches, an "a" indicates there is an article about the rivalry between the two participants.

== Players' awards ==
=== Most valuable player of the Month ===
Month	Player	Club	Ref.
September	(Argentina) Alejandro Gómez	Atalanta	
October	(Sweden) Zlatan Ibrahimović	AC Milan	
November	(Portugal) Cristiano Ronaldo	Juventus	
December	(Turkey) Hakan Çalhanoğlu	AC Milan	
January	(Serbia) Sergej Milinković-Savić	Lazio	
February	(Belgium) Romelu Lukaku	Inter Milan	
March	(Italy) Lorenzo Insigne	Napoli	
April	(Colombia) Luis Muriel	Atalanta	
May	(Ukraine) Ruslan Malinovskyi	Atalanta	

=== Seasonal awards ===
Award	Winner	Club	Ref.
Most Valuable Player	(Belgium) Romelu Lukaku	Inter Milan	
Best Under-23	(Serbia) Dušan Vlahović	Fiorentina	
Best Goalkeeper	(Italy) Gianluigi Donnarumma	AC Milan	
Best Defender	(Argentina) Cristian Romero	Atalanta	
Best Midfielder	(Italy) Nicolò Barella	Inter Milan	
Best Striker	(Portugal) Cristiano Ronaldo	Juventus	

Team of the Year
Goalkeeper	(Italy) Gianluigi Donnarumma (AC Milan)			
Defence	(Morocco) Achraf Hakimi (Inter Milan)	(Netherlands) Stefan de Vrij (Inter Milan)	(Italy) Alessandro Bastoni (Inter Milan)	(France) Théo Hernandez (AC Milan)
Midfield	(Italy) Nicolò Barella (Inter Milan)		(Ivory Coast) Franck Kessié (AC Milan)	(Italy) Federico Chiesa (Juventus)
Attack	(Colombia) Luis Muriel (Atalanta)		(Portugal) Cristiano Ronaldo (Juventus)	(Belgium) Romelu Lukaku (Inter Milan)

== Season statistics ==
=== Top goalscorers ===
Rank	Player	Club	Goals
1	(Portugal) Cristiano Ronaldo	Juventus	29
2	(Belgium) Romelu Lukaku	Inter Milan	24
3	(Colombia) Luis Muriel	Atalanta	22
4	(Serbia) Dušan Vlahović	Fiorentina	21
5	(Italy) Ciro Immobile	Lazio	20
5	(Nigeria) Simy	Crotone	20
7	(Italy) Lorenzo Insigne	Napoli	19
8	(Italy) Domenico Berardi	Sassuolo	17
8	(Argentina) Lautaro Martínez	Inter Milan	17
10	(Brazil) João Pedro	Cagliari	16

=== Hat-tricks ===
Player	Club	Against	Result	Date
(Armenia) Henrikh Mkhitaryan	Roma	Genoa	3–1 (A)	8 November 2020
(Argentina) Lautaro Martínez	Inter Milan	Crotone	6–2 (H)	3 January 2021
(Serbia) Dušan Vlahović	Fiorentina	Benevento	4–1 (A)	13 March 2021
(Portugal) Cristiano Ronaldo	Juventus	Cagliari	3–1 (A)	14 March 2021
(Argentina) Rodrigo Palacio	Bologna	Fiorentina	3–3 (H)	2 May 2021
(Croatia) Ante Rebić	AC Milan	Torino	7–0 (A)	12 May 2021

Note

(H) – Home (A) – Away

=== Clean sheets ===
Rank	Player	Club	Clean sheets
1	(Italy) Gianluigi Donnarumma	AC Milan	14
1	(Slovenia) Samir Handanović	Inter Milan	14
3	(Italy) Pierluigi Gollini	Atalanta	9
3	(Spain) Pepe Reina	Lazio	9
5	(Poland) Bartłomiej Drągowski	Fiorentina	8
5	(Argentina) Juan Musso	Udinese	8
5	(Colombia) David Ospina	Napoli	8
5	(Italy) Mattia Perin	Genoa	8
9	(Italy) Andrea Consigli	Sassuolo	7
9	(Italy) Lorenzo Montipò	Benevento	7
9	(Italy) Marco Silvestri	Hellas Verona	7
9	(Italy) Salvatore Sirigu	Torino	7

=== Discipline ===
==== Player ====
- Most yellow cards: 14
  - (Italy) Pasquale Schiattarella (Benevento)
- Most red cards: 2
  - (Argentina) Rodrigo De Paul (Udinese)
  - (Greece) Charalampos Lykogiannis (Cagliari)

==== Team ====
- Most yellow cards: 100
  - Lazio
- Most red cards: 6
  - Juventus
- Fewest yellow cards: 59
  - Inter Milan
- Fewest red cards: 1
  - Hellas Verona
  - Parma
