= ACF Fiorentina–Juventus FC rivalry =

Rivalry between two Italian football clubs

- Fiorentina Juventus
- First meeting: 7 October 1928; Divisione Nazionale; Juventus 11–0 Fiorentina
- Latest meeting: 8 November 2026; Serie A Fiorentina 2–2 Juventus
- Next meeting: 24 April 2027; Serie A Juventus v Fiorentina
- Stadiums: Stadio Artemio Franchi (Fiorentina); Allianz Stadium (Juventus)

Statistics
- Total meetings: Official matches: 197; Unofficial matches: 1 Total matches: 198
- Most wins: Official matches: Juventus (91); Unofficial matches: Fiorentina (1); Total matches: Juventus (91)
- Largest victory: Juventus 11–0 Fiorentina; Divisione Nazionale (7 October 1928)

The ACF Fiorentina–Juventus FC rivalry is an inter-city football rivalry contested between Florence-based Fiorentina and Turin-based Juventus. Unlike most other football derbies, this one is borne not out of geographical proximity (such as the Derby della Madonnina); political differences (El Clásico); or longstanding competitiveness (Liverpool–Manchester United rivalry), but rather is a development from the latter decades of the 20th century based on local patriotism, or campanilismo, bitterness and accusations of 'thievery'.

The rivalry has been fuelled by their controversial meetings in cup finals, and competition in the transfer market. A player transferring from one club to the other, especially from Florence to Turin, is usually branded a 'traitor' by fans.

Juventus is the most successful team in Italian football, winning 36 league titles, 14 Coppa Italia titles and nine Supercoppa Italiana titles, all national records. Fiorentina, meanwhile, has won two league titles, six Coppa Italia titles, and one Supercoppa Italiana.

== Background ==
To some extent the rivalry has its origins in the fans of the local teams in Tuscany, as in many other areas of Italy, growing tired of seeing people from their towns heading off to support the country's most successful teams, primarily Juventus. Like many of Europe's biggest clubs, the Bianconeri have attracted followers from far and wide, but the Renaissance town of Florence remained true to Fiorentina. In addition to this and the typical aspect of pride between the residents of two important cities, Juventus had beaten Fiorentina 11–0 in their first league meeting in 1928, a humiliating result which had not been forgotten by either set of fans despite the passage of time. They also contested the 1960 Coppa Italia final, won by Juve.

=== 1981–82 Serie A title ===
In 1980, Fiorentina was bought by Flavio Pontello, a man from a rich house-building family who had aspirations to bring the Viola its third title and built the team around Italian star, Giancarlo Antognoni. On the final day of the 1981–82 Serie A season, with both teams competing for the national championship, a series of debatable decisions in two different matches intensified the rivalry. Heading into the last game, both teams were level on 44 points at the top of the table; Fiorentina went to relegation-threatened Cagliari, who needed a point to survive, while Juventus headed to Catanzaro, in seventh position with nothing to play for. Fiorentina had a goal disallowed for a push on the opposing goalkeeper as Cagliari managed to play out a 0–0 draw to steer clear of relegation. In Calabria, Catanzaro were denied a penalty while Juventus were awarded one, from which they scored to win 1–0 and claim their 20th scudetto In the aftermath, Fiorentina's playmaker Giancarlo Antognoni famously remarked, 'Ci hanno rubato il titolo', meaning 'They have stolen the title'. The Viola tifosi soon coined a saying, 'meglio secondo che ladri', meaning 'better to be second than thieves'.

=== 1989–90 UEFA Cup final ===
Juventus won two more championships in the 1980s, while Fiorentina had inconsistent fortunes. In 1985, Fiorentina bought Roberto Baggio, an 18-year-old striker, from Vicenza, for 2.7 billion lire (£1.5 million). Considered one of the leading players of the league, he led Fiorentina to the final of the 1989–90 UEFA Cup, setting up the first all-Italian final in the history of the tournament against their arch-nemesis Juventus. Both sides had had close encounters with German teams in the semi-finals, Fiorentina beating Werder Bremen on away goals, and Juventus pipping 1. FC Köln 3–2.

The final was to be played over two legs, with the first leg to be held in Turin, while the second was held in Stadio Partenio in Avellino – Fiorentina's home stadium was under renovation for the 1990 FIFA World Cup, and the fixture was originally moved to the Stadio Renato Curi in Perugia, fairly close to Florence, but was then moved further away as punishment for supporters having staged a pitch invasion during the Werder Bremen tie. Avellino, despite being in Southern Italy, was a town with many fans of the Bianconeri and this concerned the Viola supporters. However, worries turned to anger when, with the score tied 1–1 in Turin, officials missed an apparent push by Juventus' Pierluigi Casiraghi on Fiorentina's Celeste Pin, allowing Angelo Alessio's deflected shot to fire the home side in front. Juventus ended up winning 3–1, and during the post-match interview, Pin was heard shouting 'ladri' (thieves) at Juventus' manager Dino Zoff. Between the two legs, Juventus' goalkeeper Stefano Tacconi reminded Fiorentina that, while they might win the war of words, his side would win on the pitch. The second leg ended 0–0, and Juventus became the first Italian team (sixth across Europe) to win two UEFA Cup titles.

=== Transfer of Roberto Baggio ===
Pontello was suffering from economic difficulties by this time, and was considering the sale of the club's prized asset: Roberto Baggio. Juventus were the club willing to pay a then world-record fee of 25 billion lire (£8 million), the world record transfer for a footballer at the time. His transfer led to severe riots in the streets of Florence and fans laid siege to the club's headquarters; reports described bricks, chains and Molotov cocktails being thrown. In the two days following the transfer, Pontello was forced to take refuge in the Stadio Artemio Franchi, while 50 injuries and nine arrests were recorded. Baggio was called a 'traitor', but he still held the city of Florence and its football team close to his heart. On his return to his former home, he refused to take a penalty awarded to Juventus and was seen embracing a Viola scarf thrown by the Florentine supporters while waving it in the direction of the Curva Fiesole, the stronghold of the club's ultras. While this endeared him to the Fiorentina followers, it caused a rift between him and Juventus supporters.

=== 1990s and 2000s ===
Fiorentina were relegated in 1993, and although they made it back the very next year, the rivalry took on a somewhat one-sided dimension in the following years. Both sides had scandals to deal with in the 2000s, as Fiorentina declared bankruptcy in June 2002 and was re-established by the della Valle brothers in August 2002 as Associazione Calcio Fiorentina e Fiorentina Viola, playing in Serie C2, the fourth tier of Italian football. Former Juventus player, Angelo di Livio, was the only player to remain at the club as they returned to top-flight football in two years. Both teams, among others, were implicated in the 2006 Calciopoli scandal, which relegated Juventus to Serie B, and revoked their last two titles. Fiorentina meanwhile were given a 15-point penalty applied to the next season.

In 2012, the hierarchies of the two clubs clashed after Juventus made a late bid to hijack Fiorentina's pursuit of Dimitar Berbatov. In the end, the Bulgarian snubbed both clubs for Fulham, but this did not stop the Fiorentina owners from claiming their rivals 'knew nothing of the values of honesty, fair play and sporting ethics.'

=== Late 2010s and 2020s ===
History repeated itself for Fiorentina in the summer of 2017, with the della Valle brothers looking to sell the club but with no takers. Many top players, including Matías Vecino, Gonzalo Rodríguez, Borja Valero, and Ciprian Tătărușanu were released or sold as the owners wanted to recoup funds rather than invest in the club. They wished to renew the contract of local star, Federico Bernardeschi, but he was unwilling to renew his deal with Fiorentina and instead secured a transfer to rivals Juventus for €40 million on a five-year deal. Fans responded with vulgar banners saying "A chi non piacerebbe sputarti in faccia... Bernardeschi gobbo di merda", which translates to "Who wouldn't like to spit in your face, Bernardeschi you shitty hunchback". On 9 February 2018, Bernardeschi returned to Florence, receiving vulgar insults throughout the match. He scored a free kick in the second half to silence the crowd. Due to his departure, Fiorentina looked to build their squad around their new academy recruit, Federico Chiesa, who had played in the Fiorentina system since 2007. However, in 2020, Chiesa followed Bernardeschi to Turin on loan (with an obligation to buy worth €50 million) and was met with banners calling him despicable and a traitor. In the January transfer window in 2022, young Fiorentina striker Dušan Vlahović's contract was set to expire in the summer of 2023, and with his unwillingness to sign a new deal, was transferred to Juventus for €75 million. Fiorentina president, Rocco Commisso, who wanted to transfer the striker abroad, slammed Vlahović and his agents saying "It was clear he already had a deal ... He said no to every offer. I went to England many times, each time he said no ... he wanted to ruin Fiorentina". As with the previous transfers, various insulting banners were put out by the Fiorentina fans, this time with a stronger, more-threatening tone.

== Official matches ==
- SF = Semi-finals
- QF = Quarter-finals
- R16 = Round of 16
- R32 = Round of 32
- GS = Group stage
- R1 = Round 1
- R2 = Round 2

Fiorentina win Draw Juventus win

Season	Competition	Date	Home team	Result	Away team
1928–29	Divisione Nazionale	7 October 1928	Juventus	11–0	Fiorentina
1928–29	Divisione Nazionale	10 February 1929	Fiorentina	0–4	Juventus
1931–32	Serie A	24 January 1932	Fiorentina	1–2	Juventus
1931–32	Serie A	12 June 1932	Juventus	2–2	Fiorentina
1932–33	Serie A	8 January 1933	Fiorentina	1–0	Juventus
1932–33	Serie A	28 May 1933	Juventus	5–0	Fiorentina
1933–34	Serie A	5 November 1933	Juventus	5–0	Fiorentina
1933–34	Serie A	18 March 1934	Fiorentina	2–2	Juventus
1934–35	Serie A	3 February 1935	Juventus	0–0	Fiorentina
1934–35	Serie A	2 June 1935	Fiorentina	0–1	Juventus
1935–36	Serie A	3 November 1935	Fiorentina	1–1	Juventus
1935–36	Serie A	1 March 1936	Juventus	0–0	Fiorentina
1935–36	Coppa Italia QF	24 May 1936	Juventus	1–3	Fiorentina
1936–37	Serie A	10 January 1937	Juventus	3–0	Fiorentina
1936–37	Serie A	16 May 1937	Fiorentina	2–2	Juventus
1937–38	Serie A	24 October 1937	Fiorentina	1–1	Juventus
1937–38	Serie A	16 May 1938	Juventus	5–2	Fiorentina
1939–40	Serie A	22 October 1939	Juventus	3–2	Fiorentina
1939–40	Serie A	25 February 1940	Fiorentina	0–0	Juventus
1939–40	Coppa Italia SF	9 June 1940	Fiorentina	3–0	Juventus
1940–41	Serie A	19 January 1941	Juventus	2–3	Fiorentina
1940–41	Serie A	4 May 1941	Fiorentina	5–0	Juventus
1940–41	Coppa Italia R16	18 May 1941	Fiorentina	5–3	Juventus
1941–42	Serie A	26 October 1941	Fiorentina	1–1	Juventus
1941–42	Serie A	15 February 1942	Juventus	4–2	Fiorentina
1942–43	Serie A	3 January 1943	Juventus	5–2	Fiorentina
1942–43	Serie A	18 April 1943	Fiorentina	3–4	Juventus
1946–47	Serie A	13 October 1946	Juventus	3–1	Fiorentina
1946–47	Serie A	9 March 1947	Fiorentina	2–1	Juventus
1947–48	Serie A	11 January 1948	Juventus	3–0	Fiorentina
1947–48	Serie A	6 June 1948	Fiorentina	2–4	Juventus
1948–49	Serie A	26 September 1948	Juventus	3–2	Fiorentina
1948–49	Serie A	16 January 1949	Fiorentina	0–0	Juventus
1949–50	Serie A	11 September 1949	Juventus	5–2	Fiorentina
1949–50	Serie A	15 January 1950	Fiorentina	0–0	Juventus
1950–51	Serie A	15 October 1950	Fiorentina	1–2	Juventus
1950–51	Serie A	25 February 1951	Juventus	5–0	Fiorentina
1951–52	Serie A	30 September 1951	Fiorentina	0–2	Juventus
1951–52	Serie A	2 March 1952	Juventus	4–0	Fiorentina
1952–53	Serie A	12 October 1952	Fiorentina	1–2	Juventus
1952–53	Serie A	22 February 1953	Juventus	8–0	Fiorentina
1953–54	Serie A	27 September 1953	Juventus	0–0	Fiorentina
1953–54	Serie A	14 February 1954	Fiorentina	1–1	Juventus
1954–55	Serie A	17 October 1954	Fiorentina	0–0	Juventus
1954–55	Serie A	6 March 1955	Juventus	4–1	Fiorentina
1955–56	Serie A	2 October 1955	Juventus	0–4	Fiorentina
1955–56	Serie A	26 February 1956	Fiorentina	2–0	Juventus
1956–57	Serie A	27 January 1957	Juventus	1–1	Fiorentina
1956–57	Serie A	16 June 1957	Fiorentina	2–2	Juventus
1957–58	Serie A	15 December 1957	Fiorentina	2–1	Juventus
1957–58	Serie A	4 May 1958	Juventus	0–0	Fiorentina
1958–59	Serie A	2 November 1958	Fiorentina	3–3	Juventus
1958–59	Serie A	22 March 1959	Juventus	3–2	Fiorentina
1958–59	Coppa Italia QF	10 June 1959	Juventus	3–1	Fiorentina
1959–60	Serie A	8 November 1959	Juventus	3–1	Fiorentina
1959–60	Serie A	27 March 1960	Fiorentina	1–0	Juventus
1959–60	Coppa Italia Final	18 September 1960	Juventus	3–2 (a.e.t.)	Fiorentina
1960–61	Serie A	23 October 1960	Fiorentina	3–0	Juventus
1960–61	Serie A	5 March 1961	Juventus	3–0	Fiorentina
1960–61	Coppa Italia SF	10 May 1961	Fiorentina	3–1	Juventus
1961–62	Serie A	19 November 1961	Juventus	0–0	Fiorentina
1961–62	Serie A	18 March 1962	Fiorentina	1–0	Juventus
1962–63	Serie A	30 September 1962	Fiorentina	1–0	Juventus
1962–63	Serie A	3 February 1963	Juventus	0–0	Fiorentina
1963–64	Serie A	6 October 1963	Juventus	1–1	Fiorentina
1963–64	Serie A	23 February 1964	Fiorentina	2–1	Juventus
1964–65	Serie A	8 November 1964	Fiorentina	1–0	Juventus
1964–65	Serie A	21 March 1965	Juventus	1–0	Fiorentina
1965–66	Serie A	14 November 1965	Juventus	3–0	Fiorentina
1965–66	Serie A	27 March 1966	Fiorentina	0–1	Juventus
1966–67	Serie A	2 October 1966	Fiorentina	1–2	Juventus
1966–67	Serie A	12 February 1967	Juventus	4–1	Fiorentina
1967–68	Serie A	26 November 1967	Juventus	2–2	Fiorentina
1967–68	Serie A	17 March 1968	Fiorentina	2–0	Juventus
1968–69	Serie A	19 January 1969	Fiorentina	2–1	Juventus
1968–69	Serie A	11 May 1969	Juventus	0–2	Fiorentina
1969–70	Serie A	30 November 1969	Juventus	2–0	Fiorentina
1969–70	Serie A	22 March 1970	Fiorentina	2–0	Juventus
1970–71	Serie A	24 January 1971	Fiorentina	1–2	Juventus
1970–71	Serie A	23 May 1971	Juventus	1–1	Fiorentina
1971–72	Serie A	16 January 1972	Juventus	1–0	Fiorentina
1971–72	Serie A	21 May 1972	Fiorentina	1–1	Juventus
1972–73	Serie A	3 December 1972	Juventus	2–1	Fiorentina
1972–73	Serie A	7 April 1973	Fiorentina	2–1	Juventus
1973–74	Serie A	20 January 1974	Fiorentina	2–0	Juventus
1973–74	Serie A	12 May 1974	Juventus	3–1	Fiorentina
1974–75	Serie A	19 January 1975	Juventus	0–0	Fiorentina
1974–75	Serie A	11 May 1975	Fiorentina	4–1	Juventus
1975–76	Serie A	19 October 1975	Juventus	4–2	Fiorentina
1975–76	Serie A	22 January 1976	Fiorentina	1–1	Juventus
1976–77	Serie A	12 December 1976	Juventus	0–0	Fiorentina
1976–77	Serie A	10 April 1977	Fiorentina	1–3	Juventus
1977–78	Serie A	23 October 1977	Juventus	5–1	Fiorentina
1977–78	Serie A	26 February 1978	Fiorentina	1–1	Juventus
1978–79	Coppa Italia R1	3 September 1978	Fiorentina	0–0	Juventus
1978–79	Serie A	7 January 1979	Fiorentina	0–1	Juventus
1978–79	Serie A	29 April 1979	Juventus	1–1	Fiorentina
1979–80	Serie A	6 January 1980	Fiorentina	2–1	Juventus
1979–80	Serie A	11 May 1980	Juventus	3–0	Fiorentina

Season	Competition	Date	Home team	Result	Away team
1980–81	Serie A	1 February 1981	Fiorentina	0–1	Juventus
1980–81	Serie A	24 May 1981	Juventus	1–0	Fiorentina
1981–82	Serie A	29 November 1981	Juventus	0–0	Fiorentina
1981–82	Serie A	4 April 1982	Fiorentina	0–0	Juventus
1982–83	Serie A	10 October 1982	Fiorentina	0–1	Juventus
1982–83	Serie A	20 February 1983	Juventus	3–0	Fiorentina
1983–84	Serie A	27 November 1983	Fiorentina	3–3	Juventus
1983–84	Serie A	1 April 1984	Juventus	1–0	Fiorentina
1984–85	Serie A	16 December 1984	Fiorentina	0–0	Juventus
1984–85	Serie A	28 April 1985	Juventus	1–2	Fiorentina
1985–86	Coppa Italia R1	4 September 1985	Fiorentina	1–0	Juventus
1985–86	Serie A	1 December 1985	Juventus	1–0	Fiorentina
1985–86	Serie A	6 April 1986	Fiorentina	2–0	Juventus
1986–87	Serie A	12 October 1986	Fiorentina	1–1	Juventus
1986–87	Serie A	1 March 1987	Juventus	1–0	Fiorentina
1987–88	Serie A	17 January 1988	Fiorentina	1–1	Juventus
1987–88	Serie A	15 May 1988	Juventus	1–2	Fiorentina
1988–89	Serie A	15 January 1989	Fiorentina	2–1	Juventus
1988–89	Serie A	28 May 1989	Juventus	1–1	Fiorentina
1989–90	Serie A	6 September 1989	Juventus	3–1	Fiorentina
1989–90	Serie A	17 January 1990	Fiorentina	2–2	Juventus
1989–90	UEFA Cup	2 May 1990	Juventus	3–1	Fiorentina
1989–90	UEFA Cup	16 May 1990	Fiorentina	0–0	Juventus
1990–91	Serie A	2 December 1990	Juventus	2–1	Fiorentina
1990–91	Serie A	6 April 1991	Fiorentina	1–0	Juventus
1991–92	Serie A	1 September 1991	Juventus	1–0	Fiorentina
1991–92	Serie A	26 January 1992	Fiorentina	2–0	Juventus
1992–93	Serie A	6 December 1992	Fiorentina	2–0	Juventus
1992–93	Serie A	25 April 1993	Juventus	3–0	Fiorentina
1994–95	Serie A	4 December 1994	Juventus	3–2	Fiorentina
1994–95	Serie A	29 April 1995	Fiorentina	1–4	Juventus
1995–96	Serie A	19 November 1995	Juventus	1–0	Fiorentina
1995–96	Serie A	24 March 1996	Fiorentina	0–1	Juventus
1996–97	Serie A	29 September 1996	Juventus	1–0	Fiorentina
1996–97	Serie A	23 February 1997	Fiorentina	1–1	Juventus
1997–98	Serie A	5 October 1997	Juventus	2–1	Fiorentina
1997–98	Coppa Italia QF	7 January 1998	Fiorentina	2–2	Juventus
1997–98	Coppa Italia QF	20 January 1998	Juventus	0–0	Fiorentina
1997–98	Serie A	22 February 1998	Fiorentina	3–0	Juventus
1998–99	Serie A	13 December 1998	Fiorentina	1–0	Juventus
1998–99	Serie A	25 April 1999	Juventus	2–1	Fiorentina
1999–2000	Serie A	19 December 1999	Fiorentina	1–1	Juventus
1999–2000	Serie A	22 April 2000	Juventus	1–0	Fiorentina
2000–01	Serie A	7 January 2001	Juventus	3–3	Fiorentina
2000–01	Serie A	11 May 2001	Fiorentina	1–3	Juventus
2001–02	Serie A	19 December 2001	Fiorentina	1–1	Juventus
2001–02	Serie A	16 February 2002	Juventus	2–1	Fiorentina
2004–05	Serie A	10 November 2004	Juventus	1–0	Fiorentina
2004–05	Serie A	9 April 2005	Fiorentina	3–3	Juventus
2005–06	Coppa Italia R16	1 December 2005	Fiorentina	2–2	Juventus
2005–06	Serie A	4 December 2005	Fiorentina	1–2	Juventus
2005–06	Coppa Italia R16	10 January 2006	Juventus	4–1	Fiorentina
2005–06	Serie A	9 April 2006	Juventus	1–1	Fiorentina
2007–08	Serie A	7 October 2007	Fiorentina	1–1	Juventus
2007–08	Serie A	2 March 2008	Juventus	2–3	Fiorentina
2008–09	Serie A	31 August 2008	Fiorentina	1–1	Juventus
2008–09	Serie A	25 April 2009	Juventus	1–0	Fiorentina
2009–10	Serie A	17 October 2009	Juventus	1–1	Fiorentina
2009–10	Serie A	6 March 2010	Fiorentina	1–2	Juventus
2010–11	Serie A	27 November 2010	Juventus	1–1	Fiorentina
2010–11	Serie A	17 April 2011	Fiorentina	0–0	Juventus
2011–12	Serie A	25 October 2011	Juventus	2–1	Fiorentina
2011–12	Serie A	17 March 2012	Fiorentina	0–5	Juventus
2012–13	Serie A	25 September 2012	Fiorentina	0–0	Juventus
2012–13	Serie A	9 February 2013	Juventus	2–0	Fiorentina
2013–14	Serie A	20 October 2013	Fiorentina	4–2	Juventus
2013–14	Serie A	9 March 2014	Juventus	1–0	Fiorentina
2013–14	Europa League R16	13 March 2014	Juventus	1–1	Fiorentina
2013–14	Europa League R16	20 March 2014	Fiorentina	0–1	Juventus
2014–15	Serie A	5 December 2014	Fiorentina	0–0	Juventus
2014–15	Coppa Italia SF	5 March 2015	Juventus	1–2	Fiorentina
2014–15	Coppa Italia SF	7 April 2015	Fiorentina	0–3	Juventus
2014–15	Serie A	29 April 2015	Juventus	3–2	Fiorentina
2015–16	Serie A	13 December 2015	Juventus	3–1	Fiorentina
2015–16	Serie A	24 April 2016	Fiorentina	1–2	Juventus
2016–17	Serie A	20 August 2016	Juventus	2–1	Fiorentina
2016–17	Serie A	15 January 2017	Fiorentina	2–1	Juventus
2017–18	Serie A	20 September 2017	Juventus	1–0	Fiorentina
2017–18	Serie A	9 February 2018	Fiorentina	0–2	Juventus
2018–19	Serie A	1 December 2018	Fiorentina	0–3	Juventus
2018–19	Serie A	20 April 2019	Juventus	2–1	Fiorentina
2019–20	Serie A	14 September 2019	Fiorentina	0–0	Juventus
2019–20	Serie A	2 February 2020	Juventus	3–0	Fiorentina
2020–21	Serie A	22 December 2020	Juventus	0–3	Fiorentina
2020–21	Serie A	25 April 2021	Fiorentina	1–1	Juventus
2021–22	Serie A	6 November 2021	Juventus	1–0	Fiorentina
2021–22	Coppa Italia SF	2 March 2022	Fiorentina	0–1	Juventus
2021–22	Coppa Italia SF	20 April 2022	Juventus	2–0	Fiorentina
2021–22	Serie A	21 May 2022	Fiorentina	2–0	Juventus
2022–23	Serie A	3 September 2022	Fiorentina	1–1	Juventus
2022–23	Serie A	12 February 2023	Juventus	1–0	Fiorentina
2023–24	Serie A	5 November 2023	Fiorentina	0–1	Juventus
2023–24	Serie A	7 April 2024	Juventus	1–0	Fiorentina
2024–25	Serie A	29 December 2024	Juventus	2–2	Fiorentina
2024–25	Serie A	16 March 2025	Fiorentina	3–0	Juventus
2025–26	Serie A	22 November 2025	Fiorentina	1–1	Juventus
2025–26	Serie A	17 May 2026	Juventus	0–2	Fiorentina
2026–27	Serie A	8 November 2026	Fiorentina	2–2	Juventus
2026–27	Serie A	24 April 2027	Juventus		Fiorentina

== Head-to-head ranking in Serie A (1930–2026) ==
P.	30	31	32	33	34	35	36	37	38	39	40	41	42	43	47	48	49	50	51	52	53	54	55	56	57	58	59	60	61	62	63	64	65	66	67	68	69	70	71	72	73	74	75	76	77	78	79	80	81	82	83	84	85	86	87	88	89	90	91	92	93	94	95	96	97	98	99	00	01	02	03	04	05	06	07	08	09	10	11	12	13	14	15	16	17	18	19	20	21	22	23	24	25	26
1		1	1	1	1	1												1		1				1		1		1	1						1		1			1	1		1		1	1			1	1		1		1									1		1	1				1	1		1							1	1	1	1	1	1	1	1	1						
2									2						2	2					2	2			2	2	2	2			2											2		2				2		2	2				2					2		2		2				2	2								2																	
3	3					3					3			3					3			3								3						3		3							3		3					3															3					3				3																3		
4			4									4					4			4							4					4	4	4		4			4		4																4	4			4			4												4	4				4	4	4						4	4			4	
5				5			5	5				5						5	5				5											5	5		5	5										5	5		5			5												5																		5										
6					6								6	6																	6									6		6											6			6																			6																		6	6
7																7					7		7						7																		7										7		7								7	7										7	7											7	7			
8										8							8																										8													8																													8	8					8	8		
9								9					9											9	9																			9									9												9				9					9					9															
10																																																							10								10																									10						
11																																																																														11																
12							12																							12																												12	12	12																																		
13											13																												13							13																																		13									13					
14																																																																																														
15																																																																																														15
16									16																																																				16												16														16							
17															17																																																							17																								
18																																																																																														
19																																																																																														
20																																																																										20																				

• Total: Fiorentina with 10 higher finishes, Juventus with 76 higher finishes, and 2 equal finishes (as of the end of the 2025–26 season). No head-to-heads in six seasons, since Fiorentina and Juventus were in Serie B respectively in five and one (2007) of those.

Notes:

- 1945–46 Italian Football Championship is not included in Serie A statistics.
- Both teams finished with the same number of points in 1964 and 1965, and the regulation of the time did not contemplate tiebreakers: both teams finished in fourth place.
- Due to the Calciopoli scandal, Juventus' 2004–05 title was voided, while in the 2005–06 season Juventus was relegated and the title was awarded to Inter Milan.

== Statistics ==
As of 8 November 2026

Competition	Total matches played	Juventus wins	Draws	Fiorentina wins	Juventus goals	Fiorentina goals
Divisione Nazionale	2	2	0	0	15	0
Serie A	175	83	56	36	277	187
Total (league)	177	85	56	36	292	187
Coppa Italia	16	6	4	6	26	25
UEFA Cup	4	2	2	0	5	2
Total (official)	197	93	62	42	323	214
Other meetings	1	0	0	1	0	1
Total	198	93	62	43	323	215

== Players who have played for both clubs ==
As of September 2026

Player	Years at Fiorentina (Note: Single spell as a player (excluding loans) unless otherwise stated.)	Years at Juventus (Note: Single spell as a player (excluding loans) unless otherwise stated.)	Direct	Ref.
Alberto Aquilani	2012–2015	2010–2011	No	
Arthur	2023–2024	2020–2026	Yes	
Roberto Baggio	1985–1990	1990–1995	Yes	
Federico Balzaretti	2007–2008	2005–2007	Yes	
Federico Bernardeschi	2014–2017 (Note: Senior years; played in Fiorentina's youth system from 2003.)	2017–2022	Yes	
Valeri Bojinov	2005–2006	2006–2007	Yes	
Martín Cáceres	2019–2021	2009–2010; 2012–2016; 2019 (Note: Three spells)	No	
Sergio Cervato	1948–1959	1959–1961	Yes	
Giorgio Chiellini	2004–2005	2005–2022	Yes	
Federico Chiesa	2016–2020	2020–2024	Yes	
Juan Cuadrado	2012–2015	2015–2023	Yes	
Antonello Cuccureddu	1981–1984	1969–1981	Yes	
Radu Drăgușin	2026–	2020–2023 (Note: Senior years; played in Juventus' youth system from 2018.)	No	
Claudio Gentile	1984–1987	1973–1984	Yes	
Angelo Di Livio	1999–2005	1993–1999	Yes	
Nicolò Fagioli	2025–	2021–2025	Yes	
Nico González	2021–2025	2024–	Yes	
Kurt Hamrin	1958–1967	1956–1957	No	
Moise Kean	2024–	2016–2019; 2021–2024 (Note: Two spells; senior years, played in Juventus' youth system from 2010.)	Yes	
Rolando Mandragora	2022–2026	2016–2018; 2020–2022 (Note: Two spells)	Yes	
Marco Marchionni	2009–2012	2006–2009	Yes	
Enzo Maresca	2004–2005	2000–2004	Yes	
João Mário	2026–	2025–	Yes	
Alessandro Matri	2014	2011–2013; 2015	No	
Felipe Melo	2008–2009	2009–2013	Yes	
Fabrizio Miccoli	2004–2005	2002–2004	Yes	
Adrian Mutu	2006–2011	2005–2006	Yes	
Neto	2011–2015	2015–2017; 2026–	Yes	
Hans Nicolussi Caviglia	2025–2026	2018–2025	No	
Marko Pjaca	2018–2019	2016–2023	Yes	
Enzo Robotti	1957–1965	1956–1957	Yes	
Rômulo	2011–2014	2014–2015	No	
Daniele Rugani	2013–	2026	Yes	
Giuliano Sarti	1954–1963	1968–1969	No	
Mohamed Sissoko	2013	2008–2011	No	
Paulo Sousa	2015–2017 (Note: As manager.)	1994–1996	No	
Marco Storari	2008–2009	2010–2015	No	
Luca Toni	2005–2007; 2012–2013	2011–2012	No	
Moreno Torricelli	1998–2002	1992–1998	Yes	
Pietro Vierchowod	1981–1982	1995–1996	No	
Christian Vieri	2007–2008	1996–1997	No	
Dušan Vlahović	2018–2022	2022–2026	Yes	
Cristiano Zanetti	1993–1996; 2009–2011	2006–2009	Yes	

== Trophies ==
As of 15 May 2024

Team	Major domestic				International								Grand total
Team	SA	CI	SCI	National Total	CL	CWC	EL	USC	UIC	IC	FCWC	International Total	Grand total
Juventus	36	15	9	60	2	1	3	2	1	2	—	11	71
Fiorentina	2	6	1	9	—	1	—	—	—	—	—	1	10
