= Mirwan Suwarso =

Indonesian businessman (born 1971)

- Born: 18 February 1971 (age 55); Jakarta, Indonesia
- Occupation: Football club president
- Organization: Como

Mirwan Suwarso (born 18 February 1971) is an Indonesian businessman who is the president of Como.

== Early life ==
Suwarso was born on 18 February 1971 in Jakarta, Indonesia. He studied computer science at Purdue University.

== Career ==
Suwarso worked for Indonesian streaming service Mola. During the autumn of 2024, he was appointed president of Italian side Como.

== Personal life ==
Suwarso is a Muslim. Formerly married, he has a daughter.
