= Luca Gotti =

Italian football player and manager (born 1967)

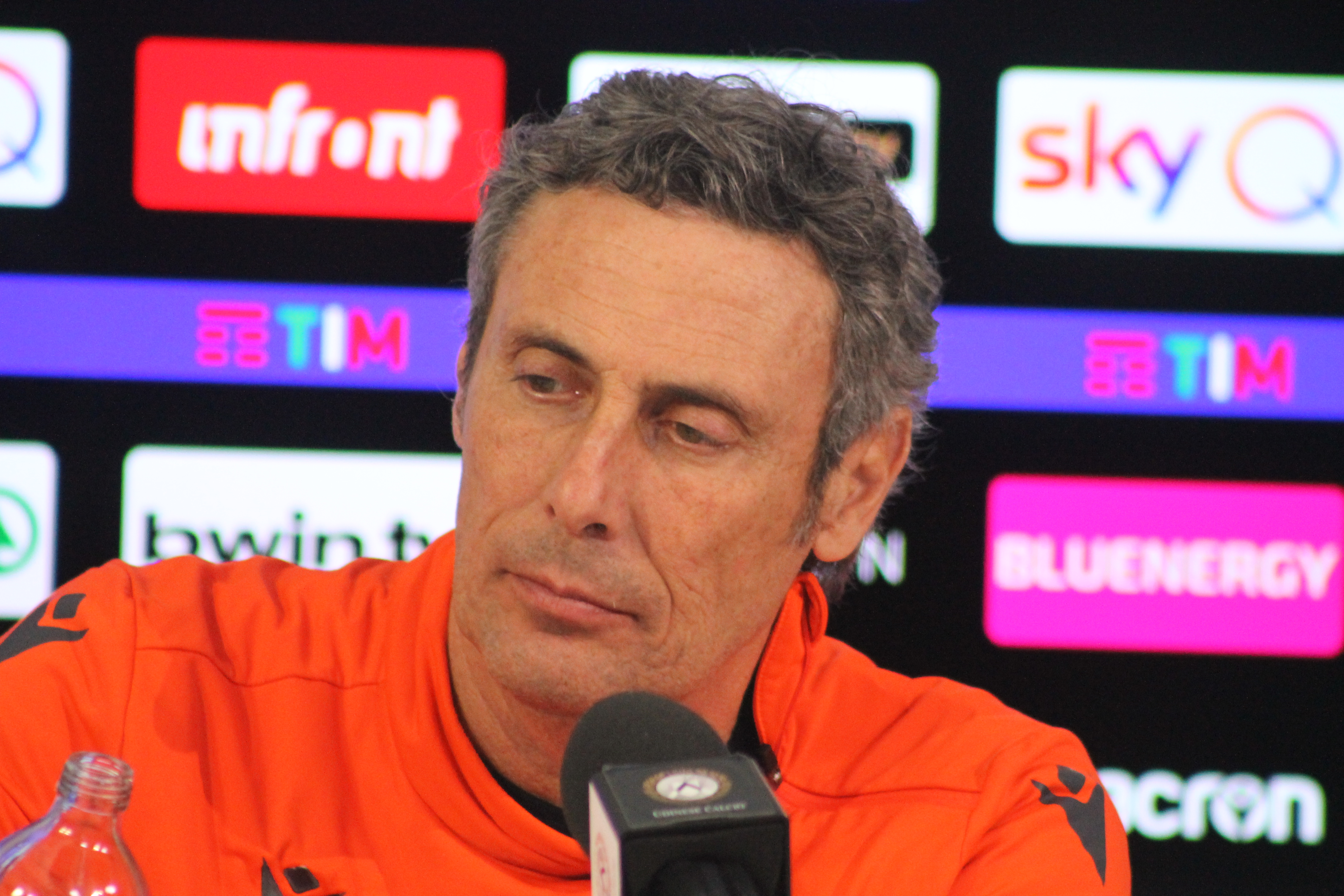
- Gotti with Udinese in 2020

Personal information
- Full name: Luca Gotti
- Date of birth: 13 September 1967 (age 59)
- Place of birth: Adria, Italy
- Position: Midfielder

Team information
- Current team: Lecce (Manager)

Senior career*
Years	Team	Apps	(Gls)
1986–1991	Contarina	293	(7)
1991–1995	San Donà	252	(6)
1995–1998	Caerano	52	(4)

Managerial career
- 1999–2000: Montebelluna
- 2000–2001: Pievigina
- 2001–2004: Bassano Virtus
- 2004–2006: Reggina (youth)
- 2006–2008: Italy U17
- 2008–2009: Treviso
- 2009: Treviso
- 2009: Triestina
- 2010–2011: Cagliari (assistant)
- 2012–2015: Parma (assistant)
- 2015–2018: Bologna (assistant)
- 2018–2019: Chelsea (assistant)
- 2019: Udinese (assistant)
- 2019–2021: Udinese
- 2022–2023: Spezia
- 2024: Lecce
- * Club domestic league appearances and goals

Luca Gotti (born 13 September 1967) is an Italian professional football manager and former player who was most recently the manager of Serie A club Lecce.

== Club career ==
Born in Adria, Rovigo, Gotti played as a midfielder for amateur clubs such as Contarina, San Donà and Caerano in the lower divisions of Italy. He achieved promotions twice during his career, with Contarina to Eccellenza after winning the 1989–90 edition of the Promozione and with San Donà to Serie C in the 1993–94 Campionato Nazionale Dilettanti season.

== Managerial career ==
Gotti began his managerial career in 1998 as part of the youth system staff of A.C. Milan. In 1999, he took over his first role as head coach, at the helm of Promozione amateurs Montebelluna. Gotti later served two more amateur clubs, Pievigina and Bassano Virtus in Serie D, before joining Reggina as a youth coach in 2004 and remaining there until 2006.

From 9 August 2006 to 21 July 2008, he worked as head coach of the Italy national under-17 team.

Gotti then served as head coach of Serie B side Treviso from 21 July 2008 to 24 February 2009, and again from 19 March to 25 June 2009, he oversaw the club's relegation by the end of the season. Gotti successively served as head coach of Triestina for a short period. However, due to poor results, Gotti was dismissed on 6 October 2009.

In December 2010, Gotti was named Roberto Donadoni's assistant at Serie A team Cagliari, then following the manager also during his stints at Parma and Bologna. He then served as Maurizio Sarri's assistant at Chelsea during the 2018–19 season.

After Sarri's departure to Juventus, Gotti accepted an offer from Udinese to become Igor Tudor's assistant manager in July 2019. When Tudor was removed from his managerial duties, Gotti was named as caretaker manager of Udinese on 1 November 2019. He won his first game in charge two days later as Serie A manager with 3–1 over Genoa, later explicitly stating his lack of interest in taking over as permanent manager. However, he completed the season as head coach of Udinese, obtaining comfortable safety, and being successively confirmed for the 2020–21 Serie A campaign.

On 11 June 2021, Udinese announced they have agreed to extend their contract with him for the coming season (2021–22) as well, until June 2022. On 7 December 2021, Udinese sacked Gotti as manager after a run of bad results.

On 1 July 2022, Serie A club Spezia announced to have hired Gotti as their new head coach on a two-year contract. He was relieved of his duties on 15 February 2023.

On 12 March 2024, he was announced as new manager of Serie A club Lecce replacing Roberto D'Aversa.

== Managerial statistics ==
As of match played 8 November 2024

Managerial record by team and tenure
Team	From	To	Record					Ref.
Team	From	To	P	W	D	L	Win %	Ref.
Italy U17	9 August 2006	21 July 2008	26	11	6	9	42.31	
Treviso	21 July 2008	24 February 2009	28	5	13	10	17.86	
Treviso	19 March 2009	25 June 2009	11	2	2	7	18.18	
Triestina	25 June 2009	6 October 2009	10	4	2	4	40.00	
Udinese	1 November 2019	7 December 2021	87	25	25	37	28.74	
Spezia	1 July 2022	15 February 2023	25	6	7	12	24.00	
Lecce	12 March 2024	9 November 2024	24	6	7	11	25.00	
Total			211	59	62	90	27.96	

== Honours ==
Contarina

- Promozione: 1989–90

San Donà

- Campionato Nazionale Dilettanti: 1993–94
