= Francesco Calzona =

Italian footballer and manager (born 1968)

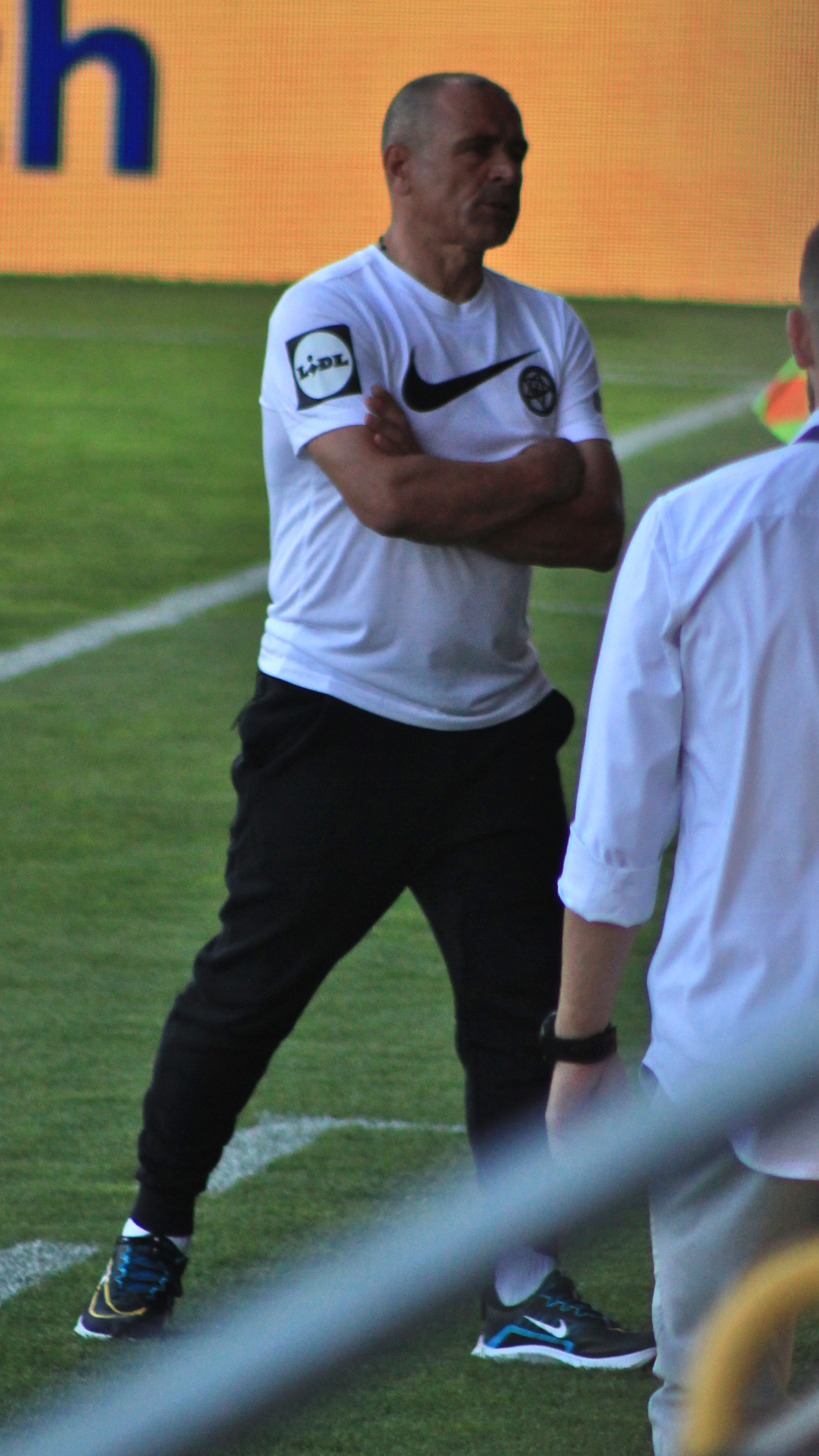
- Calzona as manager of Slovakia in 2024

Personal information
- Date of birth: 24 October 1968 (age 58)
- Place of birth: Vibo Valentia, Italy
- Position: Midfielder

Senior career*
Years	Team	Apps	(Gls)
1986–1987	Arezzo	3	(0)

Managerial career
- 2022–2026: Slovakia
- 2024: Napoli
- * Club domestic league appearances and goals

Francesco Calzona (born 24 October 1968) is an Italian professional football manager and former player. He last served as the head coach of the Slovakia national team from 2022 to 2026.

== Playing career ==
Calzona had a very short career as a player, appearing three times with Arezzo in the Serie B division, and also making a single Coppa Italia appearance.

== Coaching career ==
Calzona worked as an amateur coach and coffee dealer during the 1990s; during the course of the 1999–2000 season, while in charge of Tuscan amateurs Tegoleto, he opted to resign and instead suggest to hire up-and-coming amateur coach Maurizio Sarri as his replacement. Since then, he became part of Sarri's coaching staff, being his main assistant in all of his managerial jobs until Napoli.

In 2020, he joined Eusebio Di Francesco's coaching staff at Cagliari, then returning to Napoli the following year to work alongside new head coach Luciano Spalletti.

=== Slovakia national team ===
On 30 August 2022, Calzona was hired as the new head coach of the Slovakia national team. Following Pavel Hapal, Calzona became the second non-native coach of the team and the first of non-Czechoslovak origin.

On 16 November 2023, following a 4–2 win against Iceland, Calzona's Slovakia qualified for the UEFA Euro 2024.

On 27 April 2026, it was announced that his contract with the Slovakia Football Federation was not renewed and consequentially he left the role.

=== Napoli ===
On 19 February 2024, Napoli announced the appointment of Calzona as their new head coach for the remainder of the season, replacing Walter Mazzarri just two days before the 2023–24 UEFA Champions League round of 16 first leg against Barcelona. In doing so, Calzona worked as both Slovakia manager and Napoli head coach for the remainder of the 2023–24 season, making him the first Serie A manager ever to also serve contemporaneously as a national team manager for a foreign country during his stay. This was Napoli's third manager of the season, after Mazzarri had previously replaced Rudi Garcia. He completed the season in a lacklustre fashion, ending in tenth place and missing out on European qualification, on the worst-ever Serie A performance for an incumbent national champion.

== Managerial statistics ==
As of match played 31 March 2026

Managerial record by team and tenure
Team	From	To	Record							
Team	From	To	G	W	D	L	GF	GA	GD	Win %
Slovakia	30 August 2022	28 April 2026	40	19	8	13	56	44	+12	47.50
Napoli	19 February 2024	5 June 2024	16	3	9	4	24	24	+0	18.75
Career total			56	22	17	17	80	68	+12	39.29
