= Radici Group =

Italian chemicals company

RadiciGroup
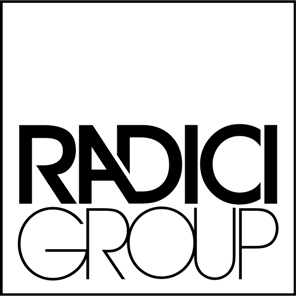
- Type: Private
- Industry: synthetic fibres and nonwovens, plastics, chemicals
- Founded: 1941
- Headquarters: Gandino, Italy,
- Key people: Angelo Radici, Paolo Radici, Maurizio Radici
- Products: for the clothing, sport, furnishings, automotive, electrical/electronic and industrial sectors
- Revenue: €1.146 billion (2017)
- Number of employees: 3,085 (2017)
- Website: www.radicigroup.com

RadiciGroup is an Italian corporation manufacturing chemical intermediates, polyamide polymers, engineering plastics, synthetic fibres and nonwoven fabric. The company is headquartered in Gandino where Pietro Radici founded it in 1941. Since 2018, the company has been one of the main sponsors of Bergamo-based football club Atalanta.

== History ==
In the 1980s Radici Chimica S.p.A. came into being following the purchase of an ex-Montedison production site in Novara.

In 2011 RadiciGroup acquired the German dorix GmbH (formerly Selbitzer Chemiefaser GmbH, founded in 1896 under the name of Heinrich Reinhold GmbH & Co. KG), based in Selbitz – Hochfranken, Bavaria. dorix GmbH is the European leader in the production of PA6 staple (dorix®) and PP staple products (reilen).

== Production chain ==
RadiciGroup manages businesses focused on chemicals, plastics and synthetic fibres, from products such as adipic acid, polyamide 6 and polyamide 6.6 to yarns and engineering plastics.

In the chemicals sector the main products are:

- PA 6 and PA 66 polymers
- adipic acid, nitric acid
- hexamethylenediamine
- 66 salt
- AGS dicarboxylic acid mixture and dicarboxylic acid esters

In the plastics sector the main products are:

- PA6 and PA 66 Engineering Plastics
- PA6 and PA 66 copolymers, PA610, PA510, PA612
- PBT (Polybutylene terephthalate)
- TPEs (Thermoplastic elastomers)
- POM (Polyoxymethylene)

In the fibres sector the main products are:

- PA6, PA66, PA610, PA612, PA510 yarns
- Polyester yarns
- PBT – PTT – PP yarns
- PA6 High Tenacity Yarns
- PA66 High Tenacity Yarns
- Textile Tire and Rubber Reinforcement Materials (PA6, PA66, PET, Aramide, Rayon & Hybrids)
- Acrylic Staple fiber, tow and Top.
- Spun bond, PP, PE and PA yarns for artificial grass and synthetic turf

Some applications of fibres include: apparel, home furnishings and automotive interiors, residential and automotive use, tailor-made products for automotive applications, such as tyre cord, airbags, filters, hoses and belts.

RadiciGroup's products are exported all over the world, and are the starting point for developments in the clothing, sport, furnishings, automotive, electrical/electronic and appliances sectors.
