= Eusebio Di Francesco =

Italian football manager (born 1969)

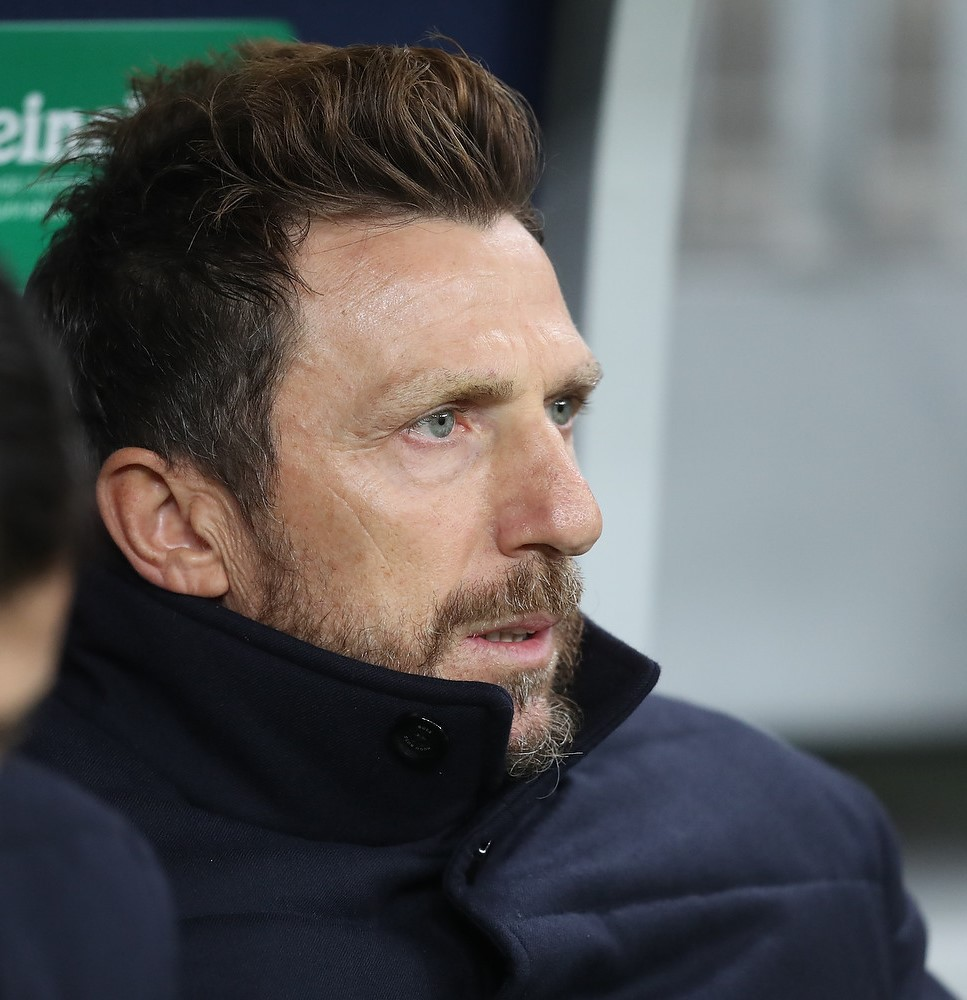
- Di Francesco managing AS Roma in 2018

Personal information
- Full name: Eusebio Di Francesco
- Date of birth: 8 September 1969 (age 57)
- Place of birth: Pescara, Italy
- Height: 1.78 m (5 ft 10 in)
- Position: Midfielder

Team information
- Current team: Lecce (head coach)

Senior career*
Years	Team	Apps	(Gls)
1987–1991	Empoli	102	(3)
1991–1995	Lucchese	139	(12)
1995–1997	Piacenza	67	(5)
1997–2001	Roma	101	(14)
2001–2003	Piacenza	61	(12)
2003–2004	Ancona	10	(0)
2004–2005	Perugia	30	(1)
Total		510	(47)

International career
1998–2000	Italy	12	(1)

Managerial career
- 2008–2009: Virtus Lanciano
- 2010–2011: Pescara
- 2011: Lecce
- 2012–2014: Sassuolo
- 2014–2017: Sassuolo
- 2017–2019: Roma
- 2019: Sampdoria
- 2020–2021: Cagliari
- 2021: Hellas Verona
- 2023–2024: Frosinone
- 2024–2025: Venezia
- 2025–: Lecce
- * Club domestic league appearances and goals

Eusebio Di Francesco (Italian pronunciation: [euˈzɛːbjo di franˈtʃesko]; born 8 September 1969) is an Italian manager and former professional footballer who played as a midfielder. He is the head coach of Serie A club Lecce.

== Club career ==
Di Francesco started his career with Tuscan teams Empoli and Lucchese. In 1995, he joined Piacenza, where he had the opportunity to play regularly in the top flight. In 1997, he was signed by Roma, winning an Italian championship title in 2001 with the giallorossi. Following this triumph, he agreed to return to Piacenza, for 2 billion lire (€1.03 million by fixed exchange rate) and then retired in 2005 following stints with Ancona and Perugia.

== International career ==
During his time with Roma, Di Francesco also made 12 appearances for the Italy national team between 1998 and 2000, and was called up for a total of 16 times. He received his first call-up while with Piacenza, under manager Cesare Maldini, when he was named in Italy's squad for 1997 Tournoi de France, although he later turned down the offer in order to help Piacenza defeat Cagliari 3–1 relegation play-off in order to remain in Serie A. He made his international debut on 5 September 1998, under Dino Zoff, in a 2–0 victory over Wales in a UEFA Euro 2000 qualifying match. In addition to his 12 official appearances with Italy, Di Francesco also made an additional appearance for the Italy national team in an unofficial friendly match against the FIFA World Stars on 16 December 1998, held to celebrate the 100th anniversary of the Italian Football Federation; he scored his only international goal during the match, which ended in a 6–2 victory to the Italians.

== Style of play ==
Di Francesco was a midfielder who was capable of playing both in centre or on the wing, he was known in particular for his leadership, versatility, and stamina, as well as his runs up and down the flank.

== Coaching career ==
=== Early years ===
After he retired from football, Di Francesco served as team manager for his former club Roma. He then served as the sporting director (in charge of transfers) for Serie C2 club Val di Sangro in 2007. In 2008, he was appointed as head coach of Lega Pro Prima Divisione club Virtus Lanciano, being later sacked in January 2009 due to poor results.

He then served as head coach of Pescara in the 2010–11 Serie B, guiding his team to an impressive season, also thanks to glimpses of attractive football. In June 2011, it was revealed Di Francesco had left Pescara by mutual consent to hold talks with Serie A club Lecce regarding the vacant head coaching post at the club from Salento. He was removed from his coaching duties on 4 December 2011, after achieving only eight points in thirteen games, and leaving his side at the bottom of the league table.

=== Sassuolo ===
On 19 June 2012, Di Francesco was appointed the head coach of Serie B side Sassuolo. At the end of 2012–13 season, he guided Sassuolo to the Serie B championship and promotion to the top-flight campaign. He was sacked on 28 January 2014 after a poor run of results, only to be re-appointed to the post on 3 March 2014 after results did not improve in his absence. From March 2014 onwards, results improved, and Di Francesco successfully coached to save Sassuolo from relegation thanks to a run of positive results (13 points in the season's final seven games). In June 2014, it was announced Di Francesco had signed an extension that will keep him contracted with Sassuolo until June 2016. He extended his contract again in April 2016, which would last until June 2019. Sassuolo finished the 2015–16 Serie A season in sixth place, sealing a spot in the third qualifying round of the 2016–17 UEFA Europa League. The following season, Sassuolo managed to advance to the Europa League play-offs under Di Francesco, and eventually sealed a spot in the Europa League group stage.

=== Roma ===
On 13 June 2017, Di Francesco was appointed as Roma head coach, replacing Luciano Spalletti, who had left for Internazionale. In his first season, he finished third, qualifying for the 2018–19 UEFA Champions League. In the 2017–18 UEFA Champions League, Roma qualified for the knockout round after topping a group including Chelsea and Atlético Madrid. In the quarter-finals, Roma were able to overturn a 4–1 first-leg deficit to defeat Barcelona and progress to the next round. They were eventually defeated by Liverpool in the semi-finals (7–6 on aggregate).

On 30 January 2019, Roma were knocked out of 2018–19 Coppa Italia, after being beaten 7–1 by Fiorentina. On 7 March 2019, Di Francesco was sacked by Roma following a Champions League exit in the round of 16 against Porto. At the time of his sacking, Roma were fifth in Serie A. Jim Pallotta, club's president, posted to Roma's official website:

On behalf of myself and everyone at AS Roma, I'd like to thank Eusebio for his work and his commitment. Since returning to the club, Eusebio has always acted professionally and put the club’s needs ahead of his own. We all wish him well for the future.

— Jim Pallotta to AS Roma's official website

=== Sampdoria ===
On 22 June 2019, he was appointed new head coach of Serie A club Sampdoria. On 7 October 2019, with Sampdoria in last place in Serie A table and with six losses in seven league games, he left the club by mutual consent.

=== Cagliari ===
Di Francesco was appointed manager of another Serie A club, Cagliari, on 3 August 2020. Di Francesco was sacked on 22 February 2021.

=== Hellas Verona ===
On 7 June 2021, he was unveiled as the new Hellas Verona head coach, signing a two-year contract, until 30 June 2023, starting with the 2021–22 Serie A season. but following three defeats in the first three league games, he was sacked on 14 September 2021.

=== Frosinone ===
On 1 July 2023, Di Francesco was named the new head coach of newly promoted Serie A club Frosinone, replacing outgoing manager Fabio Grosso. Despite an impressive start of the season, Frosinone were eventually relegated on the final matchday of the season, leading Di Francesco to depart from the club with immediate effect.

=== Venezia ===
On 26 June 2024, Di Francesco was hired as the new head coach of newly promoted Serie A club Venezia on a two-year deal. However, Venezia finished in the relegation zone during the 2024–25 season and were relegated to Serie B.

=== Return to Lecce ===
On 26 June 2025, Di Francesco was reappointed as the head coach of Lecce for the 2025–26 season.

== Personal life ==
Eusebio Di Francesco has a son, Federico (born in 1994), who followed his father's footsteps by becoming a footballer too. He plays as a winger and made his Serie A debut in March 2013 at the age of 18. Eusebio Di Francesco was named after the Portuguese Football legend Eusébio.

== Managerial statistics ==
As of 21 November 2026

Managerial record by team and tenure
Team	Nat.	From	To	Record							
Team	Nat.	From	To	G	W	D	L	GF	GA	GD	Win %
Virtus Lanciano	(Italy)	23 June 2008	27 January 2009	24	7	6	11	28	34	−6	29.17
Pescara	(Italy)	12 January 2010	22 June 2011	62	24	17	21	68	63	+5	38.71
Lecce	(Italy)	24 June 2011	4 December 2011	14	2	2	10	11	25	−14	14.29
Sassuolo	(Italy)	19 June 2012	28 January 2014	67	31	15	21	104	90	+14	46.27
Sassuolo	(Italy)	3 March 2014	13 June 2017	142	52	39	51	200	196	+4	36.62
Roma	(Italy)	13 June 2017	7 March 2019	87	46	18	23	151	104	+47	52.87
Sampdoria	(Italy)	22 June 2019	8 October 2019	8	2	0	6	7	17	−10	25.00
Cagliari	(Italy)	3 August 2020	22 February 2021	26	5	6	15	28	45	−17	19.23
Hellas Verona	(Italy)	7 June 2021	14 September 2021	4	1	0	3	6	7	−1	25.00
Frosinone	(Italy)	1 July 2023	16 June 2024	42	11	11	20	50	73	−23	26.19
Venezia	(Italy)	26 June 2024	26 June 2025	39	5	14	20	31	57	−26	12.82
Lecce	(Italy)	26 June 2025	Present	53	14	9	30	42	80	−38	26.42
Total				568	200	137	231	728	793	−65	35.21

== Honours ==
=== Player ===
AS Roma

- Serie A: 2000–01

=== Manager ===
Sassuolo

- Serie B: 2012–13

=== Individual ===
- Panchina d'argento: 2012–13
- Football Leader: 2013 (The First Serie B)
- Enzo Bearzot Award: 2018
