= Roberto D'Aversa =

Italian football manager (born 1975)

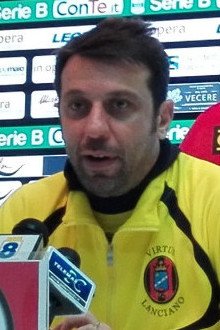
- D'Aversa with Virtus Lanciano in 2015

Personal information
- Full name: Roberto D'Aversa
- Date of birth: 12 August 1975 (age 51)
- Place of birth: Stuttgart, West Germany
- Height: 1.85 m (6 ft 1 in)
- Position: Midfielder

Team information
- Current team: Sassuolo (head coach)

Youth career
- AC Milan

Senior career*
| Years | Team | Apps | (Gls) |
| 1994–1995 | AC Milan | 0 | (0) |
| 1995–1996 | Prato | 30 | (2) |
| 1996–1997 | Monza | 25 | (0) |
| 1996–1997 | Casarano | 6 | (1) |
| 1997–1999 | Monza | 40 | (5) |
| 1999–2000 | Cosenza | 27 | (2) |
| 2000–2001 | Sampdoria | 17 | (2) |
| 2001 | Pescara | 13 | (0) |
| 2001–2003 | Ternana | 60 | (5) |
| 2003–2006 | Siena | 84 | (1) |
| 2007–2008 | Messina | 37 | (1) |
| 2008–2009 | Treviso | 18 | (1) |
| 2009 | → Mantova (loan) | 15 | (1) |
| 2009–2010 | Gallipoli | 12 | (1) |
| 2010 | Triestina | 14 | (0) |
| 2010–2013 | Virtus Lanciano | 62 | (2) |

Managerial career
- 2014–2016: Virtus Lanciano
- 2016–2020: Parma
- 2021: Parma
- 2021–2022: Sampdoria
- 2023–2024: Lecce
- 2024–2025: Empoli
- 2026: Torino
- 2026–: Sassuolo
- * Club domestic league appearances and goals

Roberto D'Aversa (born 12 August 1975) is an Italian football coach and former midfielder who is current head coach of Serie A club Sassuolo.

== Playing career ==
A Milan youth product, D'Aversa spent most of his playing career with provincial Serie A clubs and in the lower divisions.

In the 2004–05 season, he was banned for six months for match-fixing. Stefano Bettarini, Antonio Marasco, Maurizio Caccavale, Alfredo Femiano and former Siena teammate Generoso Rossi were also banned.

On 28 January 2007, he played his first Serie A match for Messina against Ascoli.

In January 2009, he was loaned from Treviso to Mantova. In July 2009, he was released due to Treviso going bankrupt. On 5 September 2009, he moved to Gallipoli. On 22 January 2010, he was transferred to Triestina on a six-month contract. In July 2010, he was signed by Virtus Lanciano on a free transfer.

== Post-playing and coaching career ==
=== Virtus Lanciano ===
After his retirement, he stayed at Virtus Lanciano as part of the non-playing staff as technical area manager. In July 2014, he was appointed as the club's new head coach to replace Marco Baroni for the 2014–15 Serie B campaign.

After saving Lanciano from relegation in his first season in charge, he was confirmed for the following season. He was sacked on 30 January 2016 after a 0–3 loss to Trapani, which left Lanciano in second-last place in the Serie B league table.

=== Parma ===
On 3 December 2016, he was named the new head coach of Parma, following the sacking of Luigi Apolloni and a short caretaker spell of Stefano Morrone for two games.

In his first season, he guided Parma to win the promotion playoffs after defeating Alessandria in the final.

He was confirmed for the club's 2017–18 Serie B season, in which he successfully led Parma to second place and direct promotion to Serie A in their first season in the second division following the club's refoundation. This was the club's third back-to-back promotion in three years (two of which under his tenure). D'Aversa was also confirmed as head coach for the 2018–19 Serie A season.

On 23 August 2020, D'Aversa was sacked by Parma, with the club citing a lack of unity and enthusiasm for the decision.

On 7 January 2021, D'Aversa was re-hired as Parma manager. After failing to save Parma from relegation, D'Aversa was successively dismissed by the end of the 2020–21 season.

=== Sampdoria ===
On 4 July 2021, D'Aversa was named the new head coach of Sampdoria in Serie A. On 17 January 2022, after achieving just 20 points in 22 league games, D'Aversa was dismissed from his role.

=== Lecce ===
On 27 June 2023, D'Aversa returned to management as the new head coach of Serie A club Lecce, succeeding Marco Baroni, who joined Hellas Verona. On 11 March 2024, D'Aversa was sacked by Lecce after he headbutted Hellas Verona striker Thomas Henry.

=== Empoli ===
On 2 July 2024, D'Aversa was announced as the new head coach of Serie A club Empoli, agreeing on a two-year contract with the Tuscanian club. However, after failing to save Empoli from relegation, he was not confirmed by the club and departed in June 2025.

=== Torino ===
On 23 February 2026, D'Aversa was appointed head coach of Serie A side Torino, following the dismissal of Marco Baroni.

=== Sassuolo ===
On 10 November 2026, D'Aversa was appointed head coach of Serie A side Sassuolo, following the dismissal of Alberto Aquilani due to poor results.

== Managerial statistics ==
As of match played 24 May 2026

Managerial record by team and tenure
| Team | Nat. | From | To | Record | | | | | | | | Ref. |
| Team | Nat. | From | To | G | W | D | L | GF | GA | GD | Win % | Ref. |
|---|---|---|---|---|---|---|---|---|---|---|---|---|
| Virtus Lanciano | (Italy) | 20 July 2014 | 30 January 2016 | 69 | 16 | 27 | 26 | 71 | 85 | −14 | 23.19 | |
| Parma | (Italy) | 3 December 2016 | 23 August 2020 | 151 | 64 | 34 | 53 | 201 | 182 | +19 | 42.38 | |
| Parma | (Italy) | 7 January 2021 | 23 May 2021 | 23 | 1 | 5 | 17 | 27 | 54 | −27 | 4.35 | |
| Sampdoria | (Italy) | 4 July 2021 | 17 January 2022 | 24 | 7 | 5 | 12 | 34 | 43 | −9 | 29.17 | |
| Lecce | (Italy) | 1 July 2023 | 11 March 2024 | 30 | 6 | 10 | 14 | 28 | 49 | −21 | 20.00 | |
| Empoli | (Italy) | 2 July 2024 | 30 June 2025 | 44 | 8 | 15 | 21 | 43 | 69 | −26 | 18.18 | |
| Torino | (Italy) | 23 February 2026 | 12 June 2026 | 12 | 5 | 3 | 4 | 19 | 16 | +3 | 41.67 | |
| Total | | | | 353 | 107 | 99 | 147 | 423 | 498 | −75 | 30.31 | — |

== Honours ==
=== Manager ===
Parma

- Serie B runner–up: 2017–18

Individual

- Serie A Coach of the Month: August 2023
