= Serie A Goal of the Month =

Italian Football award

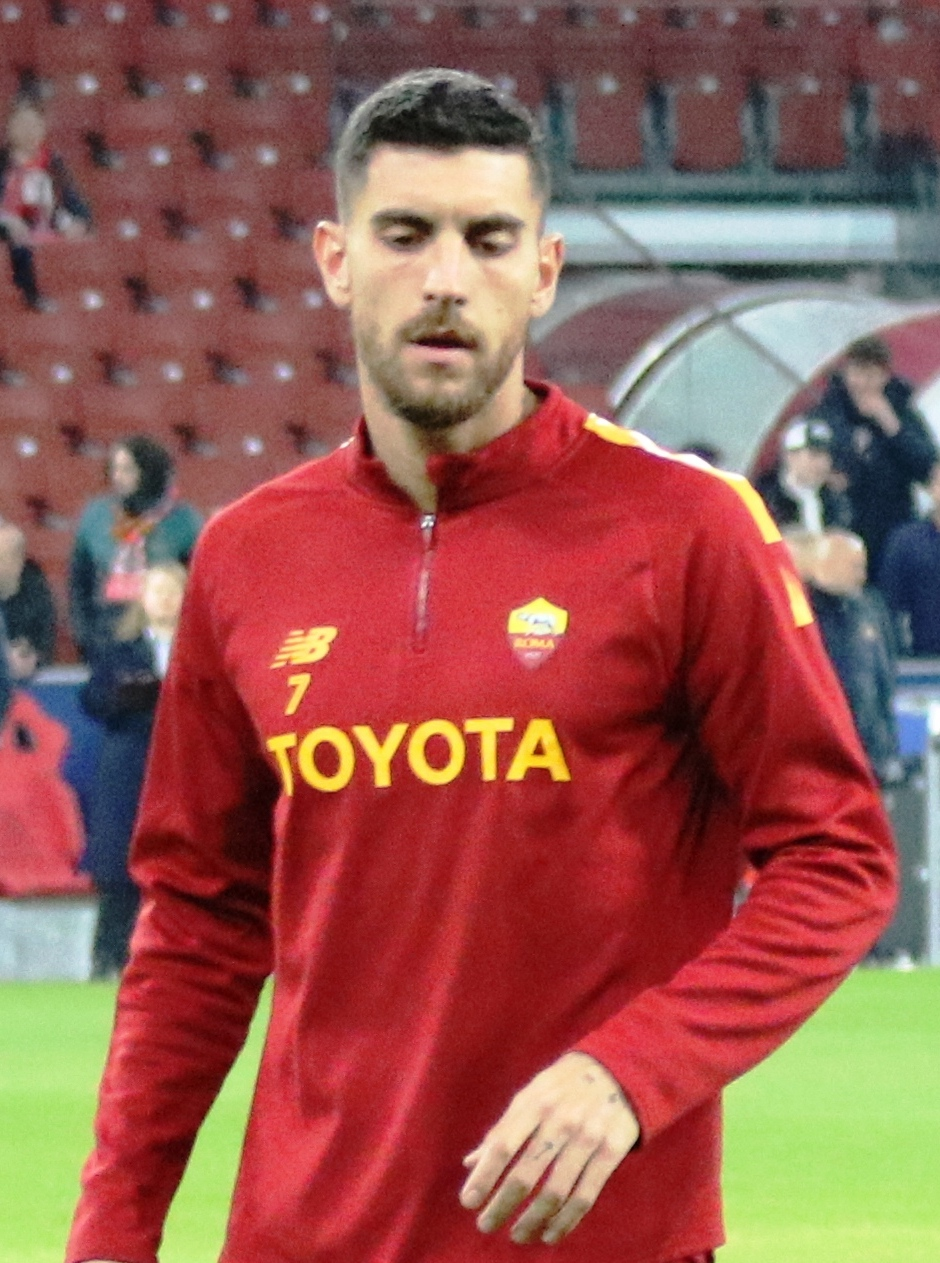
Lorenzo Pellegrini (left) and Scott McTominay (right) have won the most Goal of the Month awards with three each.

The Serie A Goal of the Month, officially known as the Iliad Goal of the Month for sponsorship reasons, is an association football award that recognises the player who is deemed to have scored the best Serie A goal each month of the season. The award was introduced for the 2021–22 season.

The first award was assigned to Roma player Lorenzo Pellegrini for his back-heel goal against Hellas Verona on 19 September 2021. Pellegrini later went on to win the award a joint record three times, alongside Napoli's Scott McTominay. Napoli and Inter Milan players have won the award a joint-record seven times, while Italy is the most represented nationality, with sixteen wins. The most represented foreign country is Scotland, with five awards.

Roma player Santiago Castro is the current holder of the award, winning for October 2026 after his goal against Genoa.

== List of winners ==
Key
Player (X)	Name of the player and number of times they had won the award at that point (if more than one)
Italics	Home team
	Serie A Goal of the Season

Month	Player	Club	Score (Note: The score at the time of the goal. Player's club's score listed first.)	Opponents	Date	Ref.
2021–22 season
September 2021	(Italy) Lorenzo Pellegrini (1)	Roma	1–0	Hellas Verona	19 September 2021	
October 2021	(Italy) Antonio Candreva (1)	Sampdoria	3–2	Udinese	3 October 2021	
November 2021	(Senegal) Keita Baldé	Cagliari	1–1	Sassuolo	21 November 2021	
December 2021	(Colombia) Juan Cuadrado	Juventus	1–0	Genoa	5 December 2021	
January 2022	(Italy) Lorenzo Pellegrini (2)	Roma	3–1	Juventus	9 January 2022	
February 2022	(Ukraine) Ruslan Malinovskyi (1)	Atalanta	1–0	Juventus	13 February 2022	
March 2022	(Italy) Lorenzo Pellegrini (3)	Roma	3–0	Lazio	20 March 2022	
April 2022	(Croatia) Ivan Perišić	Inter Milan	1–0	Bologna	27 April 2022	
May 2022	(France) Théo Hernandez (1)	AC Milan	2–0	Atalanta	15 May 2022	
2022–23 season
August 2022	(Italy) Lorenzo Colombo	Lecce	1–1	Napoli	31 August 2022	
September 2022	(Portugal) Rafael Leão	AC Milan	3–1	Inter Milan	3 September 2022	
October 2022	(Spain) Brahim Díaz	AC Milan	2–0	Juventus	8 October 2022	
November 2022	(Scotland) Lewis Ferguson	Bologna	3–0	Sassuolo	12 November 2022	
January 2023	(Nigeria) Victor Osimhen	Napoli	1–0	Roma	29 January 2023	
February 2023	(Italy) Cristiano Biraghi	Fiorentina	3–0	Hellas Verona	27 February 2023	
March 2023	(Georgia (country)) Khvicha Kvaratskhelia (1)	Napoli	1–0	Atalanta	11 March 2023	
April 2023	(Belgium) Alexis Saelemaekers	AC Milan	4–0	Napoli	2 April 2023	
May 2023	(France) Théo Hernandez (2)	AC Milan	2–0	Lazio	6 May 2023	
2023–24 season
September 2023	(France) Marcus Thuram	Inter Milan	2–0	AC Milan	16 September 2023	
October 2023	(Italy) Gianluca Scamacca	Atalanta	1–0	Empoli	30 October 2023	
November 2023	(Italy) Federico Dimarco	Inter Milan	1–0	Frosinone	12 November 2023	
December 2023	(Belgium) Cyril Ngonge	Hellas Verona	2–2	Udinese	3 December 2023	
January 2024	(Italy) Antonio Candreva (2)	Salernitana	1–0	Napoli	13 January 2024	
February 2024	(Italy) Michael Folorunsho	Hellas Verona	1–0	Juventus	17 February 2024	
March 2024	(Portugal) Dany Mota	Monza	2–0	Genoa	7 April 2024	
April 2024	(Italy) Matteo Politano	Napoli	2–1	Monza	9 March 2024	
May 2024	(Georgia (country)) Khvicha Kvaratskhelia (2)	Napoli	2–2	Fiorentina	17 May 2024	
2024–25 season
August 2024	(Italy) Nicolò Barella	Inter Milan	2–0	Atalanta	30 August 2024	
September 2024	(Equatorial Guinea) Saúl Coco	Torino	2–3	Lazio	29 September 2024	
October 2024	(Italy) Luca Mazzitelli	Como	1–2	Lazio	31 October 2024	
November 2024	(Italy) Gabriele Zappa	Cagliari	3–3	AC Milan	9 November 2024	
December 2024	(Scotland) Ché Adams	Torino	1–0	Empoli	13 December 2024	
January 2025	(Turkey) Kenan Yıldız	Juventus	1–0	Torino	11 January 2025	
February 2025	(Italy) Moise Kean	Fiorentina	1–0	Genoa	2 February 2025	
March 2025	(Slovakia) Ondrej Duda	Hellas Verona	1–0	Udinese	15 March 2025	
April 2025	(Switzerland) Dan Ndoye	Bologna	1–1	Napoli	7 April 2025	
May 2025	(Scotland) Scott McTominay (1)	Napoli	1–0	Cagliari	23 May 2025	
2025–26 season
August 2025	(Italy) Federico Bonazzoli	Cremonese	2–1	AC Milan	23 August 2025	
September 2025	(Montenegro) Vasilije Adžić	Juventus	4–3	Inter Milan	13 September 2025	
October 2025	(Scotland) Scott McTominay (2)	Napoli	2–0	Inter Milan	25 October 2025	
November 2025	(Poland) Piotr Zieliński	Inter Milan	1–0	Hellas Verona	2 November 2025	
December 2025	(Turkey) Semih Kılıçsoy	Cagliari	2–1	Torino	27 December 2025	
January 2026	(Ukraine) Ruslan Malinovskyi (2)	Genoa	1–2	Bologna	25 January 2026	
February 2026	(Scotland) Scott McTominay (3)	Napoli	2–1	Genoa	7 February 2026	
March 2026	(Portugal) Francisco Conceição	Juventus	1–1	Roma	1 March 2026	
April 2026	(Turkey) Hakan Çalhanoğlu (1)	Inter Milan	2–1	Roma	5 April 2026	
May 2026	(England) Jonathan Rowe	Bologna	3–2	Napoli	11 May 2026	
2026–27 season
Aug.–Sep. 2026	(Turkey) Hakan Çalhanoğlu (2)	Inter Milan	1–0	Monza	22 August 2026	
October 2026	(Argentina) Santiago Castro	Roma	1–0	Genoa	17 October 2026	

== Multiple winners ==
The following table lists the number of awards won by players who have won at least two Goal of the Month awards.

Players in bold are still active in Serie A. Players in italics are still active in professional football outside of Serie A.

As of September 2026 award

Rank	Player	Wins
1	(Scotland) **Scott McTominay**	3
1	(Italy) **Lorenzo Pellegrini**	3
3	(Turkey) **Hakan Çalhanoğlu**	2
3	(Italy) Antonio Candreva	2
3	(France) Théo Hernandez	2
3	(Georgia (country)) Khvicha Kvaratskhelia	2
3	(Ukraine) Ruslan Malinovskyi	2

== Awards won by club ==
As of October 2026 award

Rank	Club	Players	Total
1	Inter Milan	6	7
1	Napoli	4	7
3	AC Milan	4	5
4	Juventus	4	4
4	Roma	2	4
6	Bologna	3	3
6	Cagliari	3	3
6	Hellas Verona	3	3
9	Atalanta	2	2
9	Fiorentina	2	2
9	Torino	2	2
12	Como	1	1
12	Cremonese	1	1
12	Genoa	1	1
12	Lecce	1	1
12	Monza	1	1
12	Salernitana	1	1
12	Sampdoria	1	1

== Awards won by nationality ==
As of October 2026 award

Rank	Nationality	Players	Total
1	Italy	13	16
2	Scotland	3	5
3	Turkey	3	4
4	France	2	3
4	Portugal	3	3
6	Belgium	2	2
6	Georgia	1	2
6	Ukraine	1	2
9	Argentina	1	1
9	Colombia	1	1
9	Croatia	1	1
9	England	1	1
9	Equatorial Guinea	1	1
9	Montenegro	1	1
9	Nigeria	1	1
9	Poland	1	1
9	Senegal	1	1
9	Slovakia	1	1
9	Spain	1	1
9	Switzerland	1	1

== See also ==
- Serie A Player of the Month
- Serie A Rising Star of the Month
- Serie A Coach of the Month
