= Kim Min-jae (footballer) =

South Korean footballer (born 1996)

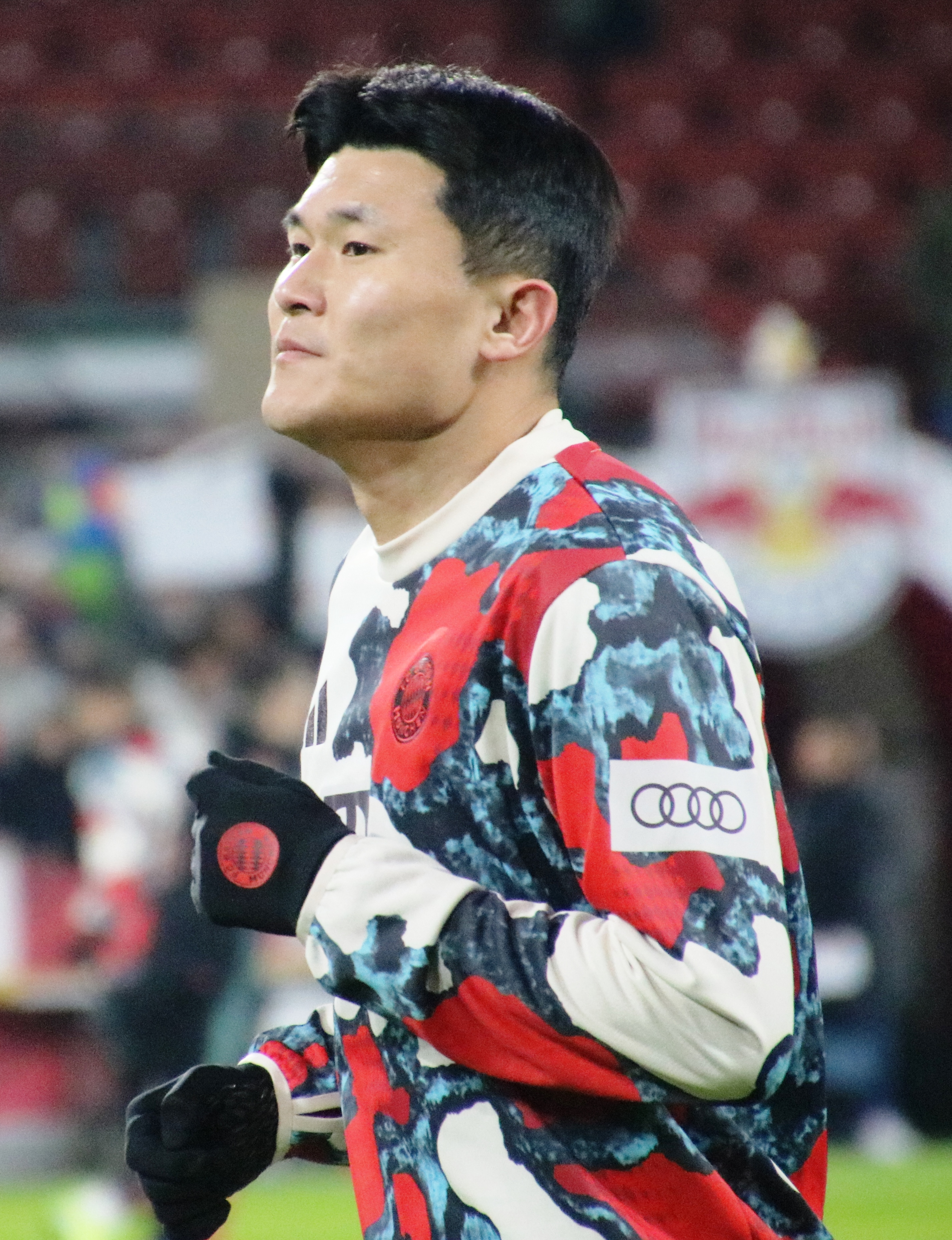
- Kim warming up for Bayern Munich in 2025

Personal information
- Full name: Kim Min-jae
- Date of birth: 15 November 1996 (age 30)
- Place of birth: Tongyeong, South Korea
- Height: 1.90 m (6 ft 3 in)
- Position: Centre-back

Team information
- Current team: Bayern Munich
- Number: 3

Youth career
- Yeoncho Middle School
- 2012–2015: Suwon Technical High School

College career
Years	Team	Apps	(Gls)
2015–2016	Yonsei University		

Senior career*
Years	Team	Apps	(Gls)
2016	Gyeongju KHNP	17	(0)
2017–2018	Jeonbuk Hyundai Motors	52	(3)
2019–2021	Beijing Guoan	45	(0)
2021–2022	Fenerbahçe	31	(1)
2022–2023	Napoli	35	(2)
2023–	Bayern Munich	83	(4)

International career^{‡}
2014	South Korea U20	2	(0)
2016–2018	South Korea U23	8	(0)
2017–	South Korea	87	(4)
Medal record
Men's football
Representing South Korea
Asian Games
Gold medal – first place	2018 Jakarta-Palembang
EAFF Championship
Winner	2019 South Korea
- * Club domestic league appearances and goals as of 21:24, 20 November 2026 (UTC) ‡ National team caps and goals as of 17 November 2026

- Kim Min-jae
- Hangul: 김민재
- Hanja: 金玟哉
- RR: Gim Minjae
- MR: Kim Minjae
- IPA: [kim.min.d͡ʑɛ]

Kim Min-jae (Korean: 김민재; born 15 November 1996) is a South Korean professional footballer who plays as a centre-back for Bundesliga club Bayern Munich and the South Korea national team.

After starting out at semi-professional club Gyeongju KHNP for half a year, Kim went on to play for Jeonbuk Hyundai Motors, where he won two K League 1 titles for two years before transferring to Beijing Guoan in 2019. After two-and-half years at the Chinese Super League, he joined Süper Lig side Fenerbahçe in 2021, and Serie A side Napoli in 2022. He was considered one of the best defenders in the world while helping Napoli win a Serie A title in the 2022–23 season. Then, in July 2023, he moved to Bayern Munich for €50 million, making him the most expensive Asian player of all time.

Kim is a South Korean international, having progressed from under-20 onwards. He represented the national team at the 2022 and 2026 FIFA World Cups and two editions of the AFC Asian Cup.

== Early life ==
Kim was born in Tongyeong. Both of his parents are former athletes and his brother was also a footballer who played as a goalkeeper for Myongji University.

Kim embarked on his youth football career with the football club of Tongyeong Elementary School. He later transferred to Gaya Elementary School in Haman and graduated from there. He entered Yeoncho Middle School and Suwon Technical High School which has produced many international footballers such as Park Ji-sung.

After he graduated from high school in 2015, he went on to Yonsei University. In July 2016, when he was in his second year, he dropped out of school to fulfill his dream of making his professional debut, although the school tried to dissuade him.

== Club career ==
=== Gyeongju KHNP ===
Kim joined semi-professional club Gyeongju KHNP on 1 July 2016, and participated in the Korea National League from the middle of the 2016 season. Kim played 15 matches for KHNP until the end of the regular season, leading his team to the play-offs. On 2 November, Kim played the quarter-final game of the play-offs for 78 minutes, contributing to a 2–0 victory over Changwon City. On 5 November, KHNP drew 1–1 with Hyundai Mipo Dockyard in the semi-final, but were not able to advance to the final due to a lower rank in the regular season standings.

=== Jeonbuk Hyundai Motors ===
On 22 December 2016, Kim joined K League club Jeonbuk Hyundai Motors on a free transfer. Jeonbuk manager Choi Kang-hee expressed his expectancy about him during the pre-season training camps in Dubai, and used him as a key player from the beginning.

Kim made his debut goal for his career in a K League 1 match against Daegu FC on 25 June 2017. He scored his second goal for Jeonbuk against Gwangju FC with a mid-range volley on 19 August. He was ousted from the game against Sangju Sangmu for warnings accumulated on 20 September. On 15 October, it turned out that Kim suffered a semilunar valve injury and for this reason Kim had to have surgery in Japan, being unable to play remaining games of the season. With his performance, he was named the K League Young Player of the Year and nominated for a part of the K League Best XI, although he was shown nine yellow cards and one red card during 29 appearances.

Kim made his first AFC Champions League debut in a 3–2 victory over Kashiwa Reysol on 13 February 2018. Kim scored his first goal of the 2018 season with a header as well as showing strong defense in a K League 1 match against FC Seoul on 18 March, and was named the MVP of the week. Afterwards, he led Jeonbuk's defense to six consecutive clean sheets. Unfortunately, however, Kim suffered from a fibula injury in a match against Daegu FC on 2 May, absenting himself from the 2018 FIFA World Cup.

=== Beijing Guoan ===
On 29 January 2019, Kim transferred to Beijing Sinobo Guoan. With his impressive defensive performance, Kim went on to play an integral role in Beijing's runner-up finish in the 2019 CSL Season.

In May 2020, Kim engendered controversy by expressing dissatisfaction about Beijing teammates' method of play in a YouTube channel, which was being operated by a South Korean football commentator, after his wedding in South Korea. At a similar time, he received intensive attention from a wide range of European clubs, and Tottenham Hotspur manager José Mourinho tried to recruit him. However, Tottenham didn't want to pay more than €5 million for Kim, and it failed to negotiate with Beijing, which demanded €10 million.

=== Fenerbahçe ===
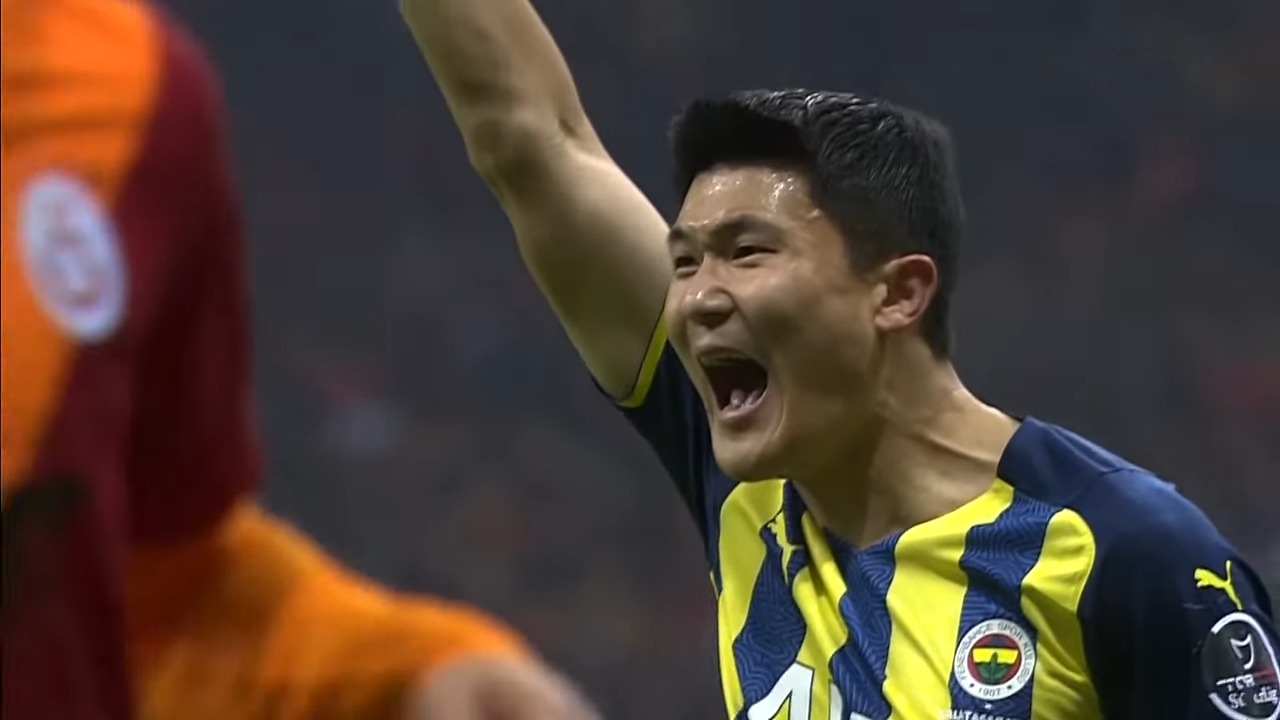
Kim with Fenerbahçe in 2021

Kim transferred to Fenerbahçe on 16 August 2021 with a transfer fee of €3 million and signed a 4-year contract.

Kim won the most number of unclaimed balls and won the most tackles among Fenerbahçe defenders in his first match for Fenerbahçe against Antalyaspor on 22 August. He made his European debut in the UEFA Europa League Group D match against Eintracht Frankfurt on 16 September. Two days after receiving his first red card in the Süper Lig against Trabzonspor on 17 October, Kim said "This was a first for me in my five-year career playing football at the highest level, I guess we have to have such experiences in Turkey." Kim led Fenerbahçe to a 2–1 victory by making the most passes and blocks in the Intercontinental Derby on 21 November, and was selected as the man of the match by Fenerbahçe fans with 76.3 percent of the votes. Kim scored his first goal for Fenerbahçe against Konyaspor on 20 March 2022. At the end of the 2021–22 season, International Centre for Sports Studies (CIES), FIFA 22 and Opta Sports selected Kim for the Süper Lig Team of the Season.

=== Napoli ===
On 27 July 2022, Kim signed for Serie A club Napoli for a reported fee of €18 million, as a replacement for Kalidou Koulibaly, who departed to join Chelsea. On 21 August, he scored his first goal for Napoli from a header in stoppage time during a 4–0 victory over Monza.

In his second month in Italy, he was named Serie A Player of the Month for September 2022. During a season at Napoli, Kim was an integral part of Napoli's victory to its third Serie A title in the 2022–23 season, the first one in nearly three decades, being named the Serie A Best Defender of the season. He was also evaluated as the best defender in Europe during the season, earning the most votes among defenders from European Sports Media and Ballon d'Or voting.

=== Bayern Munich ===
On 18 July 2023, Bundesliga club Bayern Munich announced that they had signed Kim on a deal until 30 June 2028. Bayern reportedly triggered a release clause in Kim's Napoli contract by paying €50 million (€58 million according to La Gazzetta dello Sport), and so Kim became the most expensive Asian footballer in history by surpassing Shoya Nakajima's transfer fee of €35 million. He is the second South Korean player to sign with the club, the first being Jeong Woo-yeong.

Kim scored his first goal for Bayern with a header as well as keeping a clean sheet in a 3–0 victory over VfB Stuttgart on 17 December. In the first half of the 2023–24 season, he was selected for Bundesliga's Best XI by fans, but magazine kicker criticised his inconsistent performance including his mistakes against 1. FC Saarbrücken, which eliminated Bayern from the DFB-Pokal. During the second half of the season, he frequently allowed the space behind him due to his inaccurate decisions, and manager Thomas Tuchel preferred Eric Dier and Matthijs de Ligt after pointing out that he did not follow the promised tactics. Tuchel criticised him openly once again after the UEFA Champions League semi-final first leg against Real Madrid, where he played instead of De Ligt.

Early in the 2024–25 season, after the dismissal of Tuchel and the departure of De Ligt, Bayern's new manager Vincent Kompany chose Kim and Dayot Upamecano in the starting line-up. During the first game of the 2024–25 Bundesliga, Kim's tactical error led to a VfL Wolfsburg goal. After a rough start, he contributed to the club's seven consecutive clean sheets alongside Upamecano and Manuel Neuer between October and November 2024. On 26 November, Kim scored his first Champions League goal and was named Player of the Match in a 1–0 win over Paris Saint-Germain. But he was once again criticised by media for his instability during the following games of the season. Shortly after, it was revealed Kim was on painkillers after getting an Achilles tendinitis in a match against Eintracht Frankfurt in October 2024, and his request for rest in February 2025 was denied due to his teammates' successive injuries. Kim's injury turned into a cyst, as he continued to play throughout the season in order to help the club reclaim the Bundesliga title, while the team conceded the fewest goals of the tournament. During the Champions League quarter-finals against Inter Milan, in which Bayern was eliminated, Kim's errors in aerial duels caused further controversies among supporters, even though some of them knew he was playing under the unsolved injury. By the end of the season, Kim was included in the team's travel to the 2025 FIFA Club World Cup in the United States despite his injury. Kim ultimately did not play during the Club World Cup, as Bayern signed Jonathan Tah before the tournament.

During the 2025–26 season, following the arrival of Tah, Kim was mostly used as a back-up player. In the Bundesliga opener against RB Leipzig on 22 August 2025, which ended in a 6–0 win, 68th-minute substitute Kim intercepted the ball behind the half-way line, dribbled to the opponents' penalty area, and provided an assist followed by Harry Kane's hat-trick. On 25 October, he played instead of Tah in a 3–0 win over Borussia Mönchengladbach, recording his first clean sheet of the season. On 1 November, he played instead of Upamecano in a 3–0 win over Bayer Leverkusen, keeping the second consecutive Bundesliga clean sheet. On 21 January 2026, he received two yellow cards in a 2–0 Champions League win over Union Saint-Gilloise, being sent off for the first time since joining Bayern in 2023. He was not a main player at the Champions League, whereas he made 25 appearances including 19 starts at the Bundesliga, where the club won their second successive title.

== International career ==
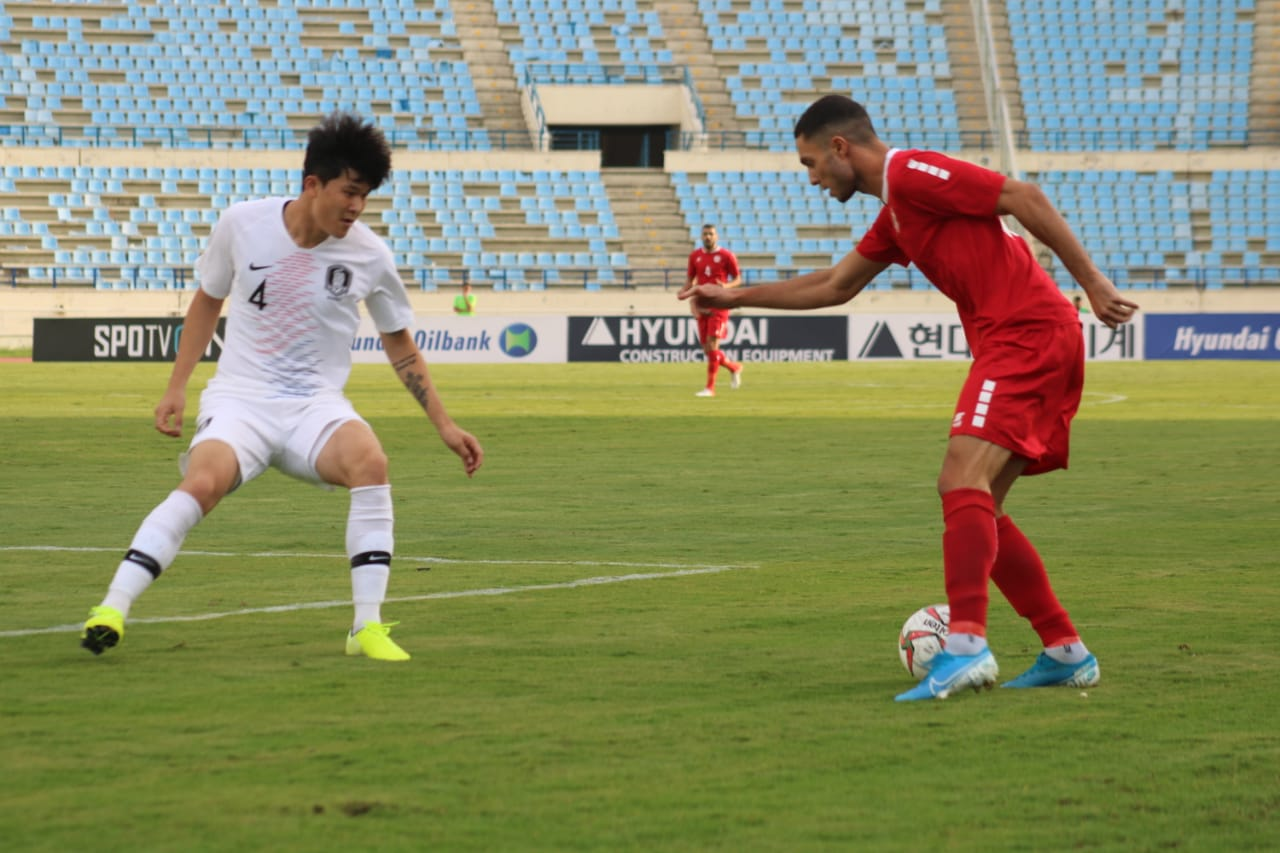
Kim (left) playing for South Korea in 2019

On 14 August 2017, Kim was named in South Korea's squad for the last two qualifiers for the 2018 World Cup against Iran and Uzbekistan. In said tournament against Iran on 31 August 2017, Kim debuted as a starter and sent off Iranian footballer Saeid Ezatolahi while showing great defense for 84 minutes. On 5 September, Kim played as a full-time player against Uzbekistan, helping South Korea keep one more clean sheet. After these matches, South Korea qualified for the ninth consecutive FIFA World Cup. However, he suffered an injury on 8 May 2018 and was unable to take part in that year's World Cup.

On 1 September 2018, South Korea defeated Japan 2–1 in the gold medal match of the 2018 Asian Games. As a result of this victory, Kim and his teammates received an exemption from military service, reducing the two-year conscription to just a few weeks of basic training, which he later served in the summer of 2023.

Kim was named in the South Korea squad for the 2022 FIFA World Cup. He helped his team keep clean sheet in the first match against Uruguay, but he and his teammates conceded a total of seven goals in the matches against Ghana and Brazil. During the third match against Portugal, he was sidelined after an injury in his right calf from the first match. South Korea was eliminated from the tournament after losing 4–1 to Brazil in the round of 16.

Kim played for the national team under manager Jürgen Klinsmann at the 2023 AFC Asian Cup. He helped his nation reach the semi-finals, but received his second yellow card of the tournament in the quarter-finals against Australia. South Korea lost 2–0 to Jordan in the semi-finals during his absence.

Kim played three Group A matches at the 2026 FIFA World Cup. He successfully emasculated opposing forwards especially striker Patrik Schick in a 2–1 win over Czech Republic, and also did not make an individual mistake in a 1–0 loss to Mexico. He left the field in the 65th minute of the last group stage match against South Africa due to a calf injury. South Korea dropped out of the tournament after losing 1–0 to South Africa.

== Style of play ==
As a centre-back, Kim has excellent physical attributes, notably his strength, speed, height, and flexibility. Kim has a strong predictive ability in defense, and can often start and finish plays when the team advances. His long pass accuracy enables him to immediately hit the ball after the steal to complete a quick counterattack, and his excellent aerial ability and positioning allows him to perform headers to break up opposition attacks and start offensive plays.

Typically, Kim positions himself as the rearmost player in his team's defensive formation. This strategic placement affords him ample time to decide whether to hold his position or confront the opposition. Despite his tendency to stay back, Kim exhibits a proactive and aggressive approach in winning possession beyond his defensive line. His blend of speed and physical strength makes him highly effective in regaining control for his team. At Bayern Munich, however, Kim has been criticised for struggling to adjust to playing in a higher defensive line.

== Personal life ==
In January 2021, Kim was appointed as an ambassador for the Purme Foundation. He decided to contribute to the rehabilitation of children with disabilities and the independence of young people with disabilities, and donated ₩50 million (€38,000 of January 2021).

== Career statistics ==
=== Club ===
As of match played 20 November 2026

Appearances and goals by club, season and competition
Club	Season	League			National cup (Note: Includes Korean FA Cup, Chinese FA Cup, Turkish Cup, Coppa Italia, DFB-Pokal)		Continental		Other		Total	
Club	Season	Division	Apps	Goals	Apps	Goals	Apps	Goals	Apps	Goals	Apps	Goals
Gyeongju KHNP	2016	Korea National League	15	0	0	0	—		2 (Note: Appearances in Korea National League Championship)	0	17	0
Jeonbuk Hyundai Motors	2017	K League 1	29	2	1	0	—		—		30	2
Jeonbuk Hyundai Motors	2018	K League 1	23	1	1	0	6 (Note: Appearances in AFC Champions League)	0	—		30	1
Jeonbuk Hyundai Motors	Total		52	3	2	0	6	0	—		60	3
Beijing Guoan	2019	Chinese Super League	26	0	2	0	6	0	—		34	0
Beijing Guoan	2020	Chinese Super League	17	0	0	0	6	0	—		23	0
Beijing Guoan	2021	Chinese Super League	2	0	0	0	0	0	—		2	0
Beijing Guoan	Total		45	0	2	0	12	0	—		59	0
Fenerbahçe	2021–22	Süper Lig	31	1	1	0	8 (Note: Six appearances in UEFA Europa League, two appearances in UEFA Conference League)	0	—		40	1
Napoli	2022–23	Serie A	35	2	1	0	9 (Note: Appearances in UEFA Champions League)	0	—		45	2
Bayern Munich	2023–24	Bundesliga	25	1	1	0	9	0	1 (Note: Appearance in DFL-/Franz Beckenbauer Supercup)	0	36	1
Bayern Munich	2024–25	Bundesliga	27	2	3	0	13	1	0	0	43	3
Bayern Munich	2025–26	Bundesliga	25	1	3	0	8	0	1	0	37	1
Bayern Munich	2026–27	Bundesliga	6	0	1	0	3	0	1	0	11	0
Bayern Munich	Total		83	4	8	0	33	1	3	0	127	5
Career total			261	10	14	0	68	1	5	0	348	11

=== International ===
As of match played 17 November 2026

Appearances and goals by national team and year
National team	Year	Apps	Goals
South Korea	2017	2	0
South Korea	2018	10	0
South Korea	2019	18	3
South Korea	2021	8	0
South Korea	2022	9	0
South Korea	2023	8	1
South Korea	2024	14	0
South Korea	2025	6	0
South Korea	2026	12	0
Total		87	4

As of match played 10 October 2025
Scores and results list South Korea's goal tally first, score column indicates score after each Kim goal.

List of international goals scored by Kim Min-jae
No.	Date	Venue	Opponent	Score	Result	Competition
1	11 January 2019	Hazza bin Zayed Stadium, Al Ain, United Arab Emirates	Kyrgyzstan	1–0	1–0	2019 AFC Asian Cup
2	16 January 2019	Al Nahyan Stadium, Abu Dhabi, United Arab Emirates	China	2–0	2–0	2019 AFC Asian Cup
3	15 December 2019	Busan Asiad Main Stadium, Busan, South Korea	China	1–0	1–0	2019 EAFF Championship
4	17 October 2023	Suwon World Cup Stadium, Suwon, South Korea	Vietnam	1–0	6–0	Friendly

== Honours ==
Jeonbuk Hyundai Motors

- K League 1: 2017, 2018

Napoli

- Serie A: 2022–23

Bayern Munich

- Bundesliga: 2024–25, 2025–26
- DFB-Pokal: 2025–26
- Franz Beckenbauer Supercup: 2025, 2026

South Korea U23

- Asian Games: 2018

South Korea

- EAFF Championship: 2019

Individual

- IFFHS Men's World Team: 2023
- AFC Asian Cup Team of the Tournament: 2019, 2023
- AFC Asian International Player of the Year: 2022
- IFFHS Asian Men's Team of the Year: 2022, 2023, 2024, 2025
- ESM Team of the Season: 2022–23
- EAFF Championship Best Defender: 2019
- K League 1 Young Player of the Year: 2017
- K League 1 Best XI: 2017, 2018
- Korean FA Player of the Year: 2023
- Serie A Player of the Month: September 2022
- Serie A Best Defender: 2022–23
- Serie A Team of the Season: 2022–23
- AIC Serie A Player of the Month: October 2022
- AIC Serie A Team of the Year: 2022–23
