= Serie A Player of the Month =

Serie A monthly award

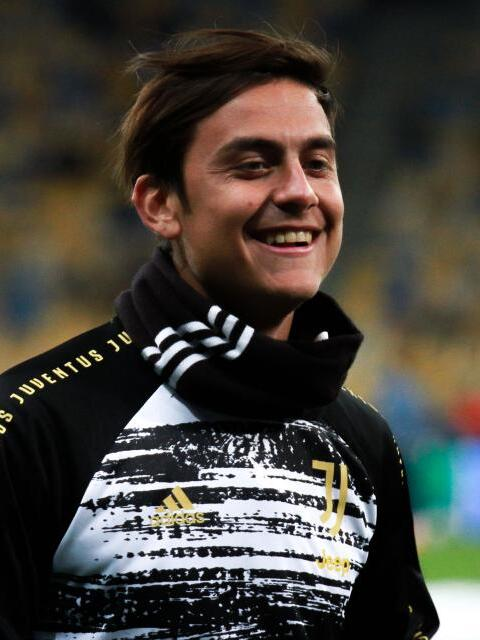
Paulo Dybala has won the award a record five times.

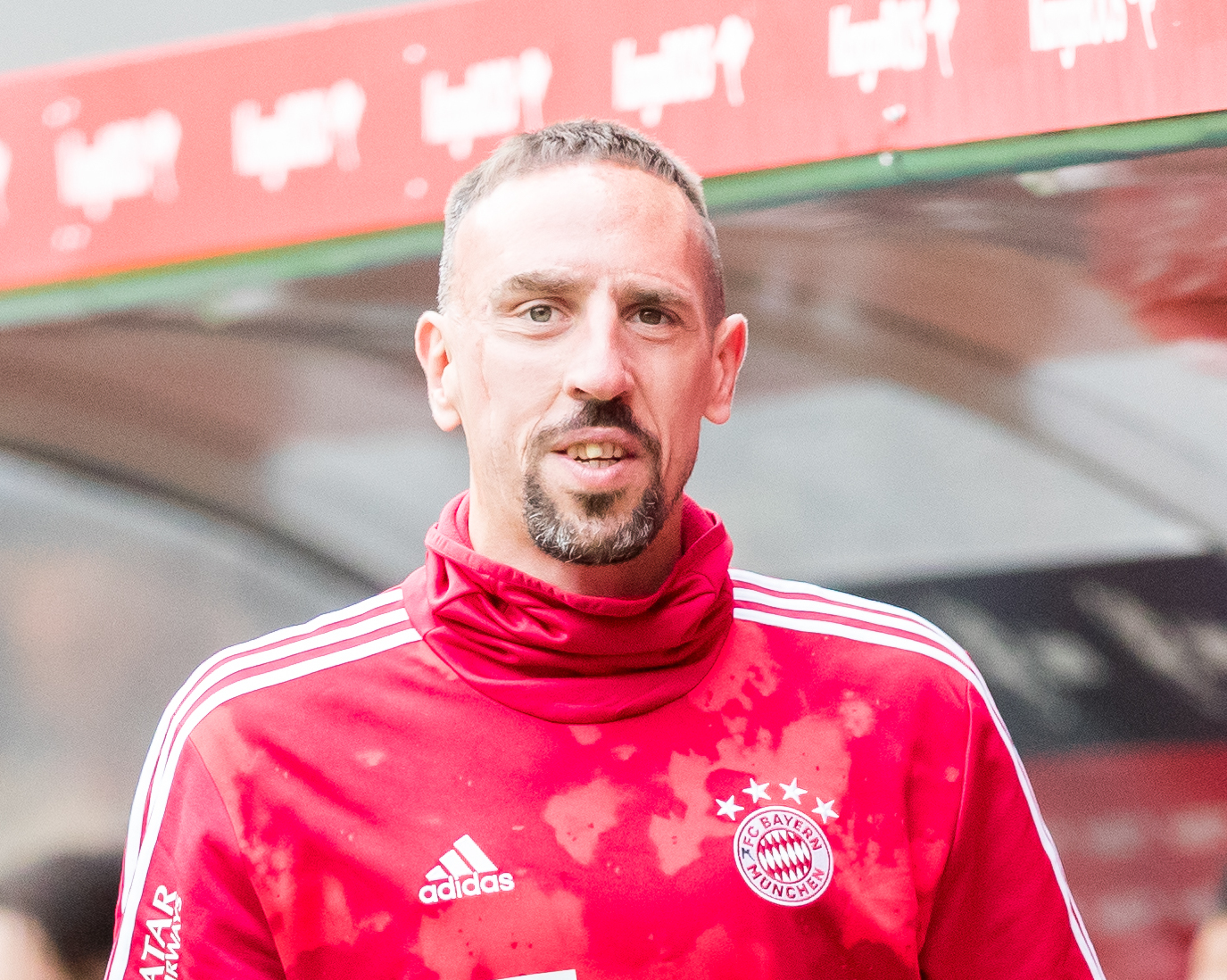
Franck Ribéry was the inaugural recipient of the award in September 2019.

The Serie A Player of the Month, officially known as the EA Sports FC Player of the Month for sponsorship reasons, is an association football award that recognises the best player each month in Serie A, the top tier of the Italian football league system. The winner is chosen by an online public vote, in which voters choose from five nominees. The nominees are chosen through analysis by data tracking software, which consider statistical data, positional data and the contribution to the technical and physical efficiency of the team.

The first award was assigned to Fiorentina player Franck Ribéry for his performances in September 2019. Paulo Dybala has won the award a record five times; he, Khvicha Kvaratskhelia, Rafael Leão and Lautaro Martínez are the only four players to win the award multiple times in the same season, while Kvaratskhelia is the only player to win in consecutive months. Napoli players have won the award a record twelve times and they alongside Atalanta are the only clubs to have players win the award in consecutive months. Hakan Çalhanoğlu, Dybala, Dušan Vlahović and Moise Kean are the only players to win the award with two different teams: AC Milan and Inter Milan for Çalhanoğlu, Juventus and Roma for Dybala and Fiorentina and Juventus for both Vlahović and Kean.

Kalidou Koulibaly, Kim Min-jae, Alessandro Bastoni, Riccardo Calafiori and Federico Dimarco are the only defenders to win the award, which has been given to 14 midfielders and 32 forwards. It has also been given to foreign players 47 times; the most represented foreign country is Argentina with eleven titles, followed by Portugal and France with five each. The most recent winner is Frosinone's Giacomo Calò, who won it for his performances in October 2026.

== Key ==
- Position key: GK – Goalkeeper; DF – Defender; MF – Midfielder; FW – Forward.

== List of winners ==
List of Serie A Player of Month winners
Season	Month	Player	Nationality	Pos.	Club
2019–20	September 2019	Franck Ribéry	France	FW	Fiorentina
2019–20	October 2019	Ciro Immobile	Italy	FW	Lazio
2019–20	November 2019	Radja Nainggolan	Belgium	MF	Cagliari
2019–20	December 2019	Sergej Milinković-Savić	Serbia	MF	Lazio
2019–20	January 2020	Cristiano Ronaldo	Portugal	FW	Juventus
2019–20	February 2020	Luis Alberto	Spain	MF	Lazio
2019–20	June 2020	Alejandro Gómez	Argentina	MF	Atalanta
2019–20	July 2020	Paulo Dybala	Argentina	FW	Juventus
2020–21	September 2020	Alejandro Gómez	Argentina	MF	Atalanta
2020–21	October 2020	Zlatan Ibrahimović	Sweden	FW	AC Milan
2020–21	November 2020	Cristiano Ronaldo	Portugal	FW	Juventus
2020–21	December 2020	Hakan Çalhanoğlu	Turkey	MF	AC Milan
2020–21	January 2021	Sergej Milinković-Savić	Serbia	MF	Lazio
2020–21	February 2021	Romelu Lukaku	Belgium	FW	Inter Milan
2020–21	March 2021	Lorenzo Insigne	Italy	FW	Napoli
2020–21	April 2021	Luis Muriel	Colombia	FW	Atalanta
2020–21	May 2021	Ruslan Malinovskyi	Ukraine	MF	Atalanta
2021–22	September 2021	Kalidou Koulibaly	Senegal	DF	Napoli
2021–22	October 2021	Giovanni Simeone	Argentina	FW	Hellas Verona
2021–22	November 2021	Hakan Çalhanoğlu	Turkey	MF	Inter Milan
2021–22	December 2021	Dušan Vlahović	Serbia	FW	Fiorentina
2021–22	January 2022	Giacomo Raspadori	Italy	FW	Sassuolo
2021–22	February 2022	Ruslan Malinovskyi	Ukraine	FW	Atalanta
2021–22	March 2022	Victor Osimhen	Nigeria	FW	Napoli
2021–22	April 2022	Marcelo Brozović	Croatia	MF	Inter Milan
2021–22	May 2022	Sandro Tonali	Italy	MF	AC Milan
2022–23	August 2022	Khvicha Kvaratskhelia	Georgia	FW	Napoli
2022–23	September 2022	Kim Min-jae	South Korea	DF	Napoli
2022–23	October 2022	Rafael Leão	Portugal	FW	AC Milan
2022–23	November 2022	Moise Kean	Italy	FW	Juventus
2022–23	January 2023	Victor Osimhen	Nigeria	FW	Napoli
2022–23	February 2023	Khvicha Kvaratskhelia	Georgia	FW	Napoli
2022–23	March 2023	Khvicha Kvaratskhelia	Georgia	FW	Napoli
2022–23	April 2023	Rafael Leão	Portugal	FW	AC Milan
2022–23	May 2023	Boulaye Dia	Senegal	FW	Salernitana
2023–24	September 2023	Rafael Leão	Portugal	FW	AC Milan
2023–24	October 2023	Lautaro Martínez	Argentina	FW	Inter Milan
2023–24	November 2023	Paulo Dybala	Argentina	FW	Roma
2023–24	December 2023	Christian Pulisic	United States	MF	AC Milan
2023–24	January 2024	Dušan Vlahović	Serbia	FW	Juventus
2023–24	February 2024	Paulo Dybala	Argentina	FW	Roma
2023–24	March 2024	Alessandro Bastoni	Italy	DF	Inter Milan
2023–24	April 2024	Paulo Dybala	Argentina	FW	Roma
2023–24	May 2024	Riccardo Calafiori	Italy	DF	Bologna
2024–25	August 2024	Marcus Thuram	France	FW	Inter Milan
2024–25	September 2024	Khvicha Kvaratskhelia	Georgia	FW	Napoli
2024–25	October 2024	Mateo Retegui	Italy	FW	Atalanta
2024–25	November 2024	Moise Kean	Italy	FW	Fiorentina
2024–25	December 2024	Paulo Dybala	Argentina	FW	Roma
2024–25	January 2025	Frank Anguissa	Cameroon	MF	Napoli
2024–25	February 2025	Randal Kolo Muani	France	FW	Juventus
2024–25	March 2025	Artem Dovbyk	Ukraine	FW	Roma
2024–25	April 2025	Scott McTominay	Scotland	MF	Napoli
2024–25	May 2025	Khéphren Thuram	France	MF	Juventus
2025–26	August 2025	Kenan Yıldız	Turkey	FW	Juventus
2025–26	September 2025	Christian Pulisic	United States	MF	AC Milan
2025–26	October 2025	Frank Anguissa	Cameroon	MF	Napoli
2025–26	November 2025	Jamie Vardy	England	FW	Cremonese
2025–26	December 2025	Lautaro Martínez	Argentina	FW	Inter Milan
2025–26	January 2026	Federico Dimarco	Italy	DF	Inter Milan
2025–26	February 2026	Donyell Malen	Netherlands	FW	Roma
2025–26	March 2026	Jérémie Boga	Ivory Coast	FW	Juventus
2025–26	April 2026	Marcus Thuram	France	FW	Inter Milan
2025–26	May 2026	Lautaro Martínez	Argentina	FW	Inter Milan
2026–27	Aug.–Sep. 2026	Donyell Malen	Netherlands	FW	Roma
2026–27	October 2026	Giacomo Calò	Italy	MF	Frosinone

== Multiple winners ==
As of September 2026

Players in bold are still active in Serie A. Players in italics are still active in professional football outside of Serie A.

Multiple winners
Rank	Player	Wins
1	(Argentina) **Paulo Dybala**	**5**
2	(Georgia (country)) Khvicha Kvaratskhelia	**4**
3	(Portugal) Rafael Leão	**3**
3	(Argentina) **Lautaro Martínez**	**3**
5	(Cameroon) **Frank Anguissa**	**2**
5	(Turkey) **Hakan Çalhanoğlu**	**2**
5	(Argentina) Alejandro Gómez	**2**
5	(Italy) **Moise Kean**	**2**
5	(Netherlands) **Donyell Malen**	**2**
5	(Ukraine) Ruslan Malinovskyi	**2**
5	(Serbia) Sergej Milinković-Savić	**2**
5	(Nigeria) Victor Osimhen	**2**
5	(United States) **Christian Pulisic**	**2**
5	(Portugal) Cristiano Ronaldo	**2**
5	(France) **Marcus Thuram**	**2**
5	(Serbia) Dušan Vlahović	**2**

== Awards won by club ==
As of October 2026

Winning clubs
Rank	Club	Players	Wins
1	Napoli	6	12
2	Inter Milan	7	10
3	Juventus	8	9
4	AC Milan	5	8
5	Roma	3	7
6	Atalanta	4	6
7	Lazio	3	4
8	Fiorentina	3	3
9	Bologna	1	1
9	Cagliari	1	1
9	Cremonese	1	1
9	Frosinone	1	1
9	Hellas Verona	1	1
9	Salernitana	1	1
9	Sassuolo	1	1

== Awards won by nationality ==
As of October 2026 award

Winning nations
Rank	Nationality	Players	Wins
1	Argentina	4	11
1	Italy	10	11
3	France	4	5
3	Portugal	2	5
5	Georgia	1	4
5	Serbia	2	4
7	Turkey	2	3
7	Ukraine	2	3
9	Belgium	2	2
9	Cameroon	1	2
9	Netherlands	1	2
9	Nigeria	1	2
9	Senegal	2	2
9	United States	1	2
15	Colombia	1	1
15	Croatia	1	1
15	England	1	1
15	Ivory Coast	1	1
15	Scotland	1	1
15	South Korea	1	1
15	Spain	1	1
15	Sweden	1	1

== See also ==
- Serie A Coach of the Month
- Serie A Rising Star of the Month
- Serie A Goal of the Month
