= Nico Paz =

Argentina international footballer (born 2004)

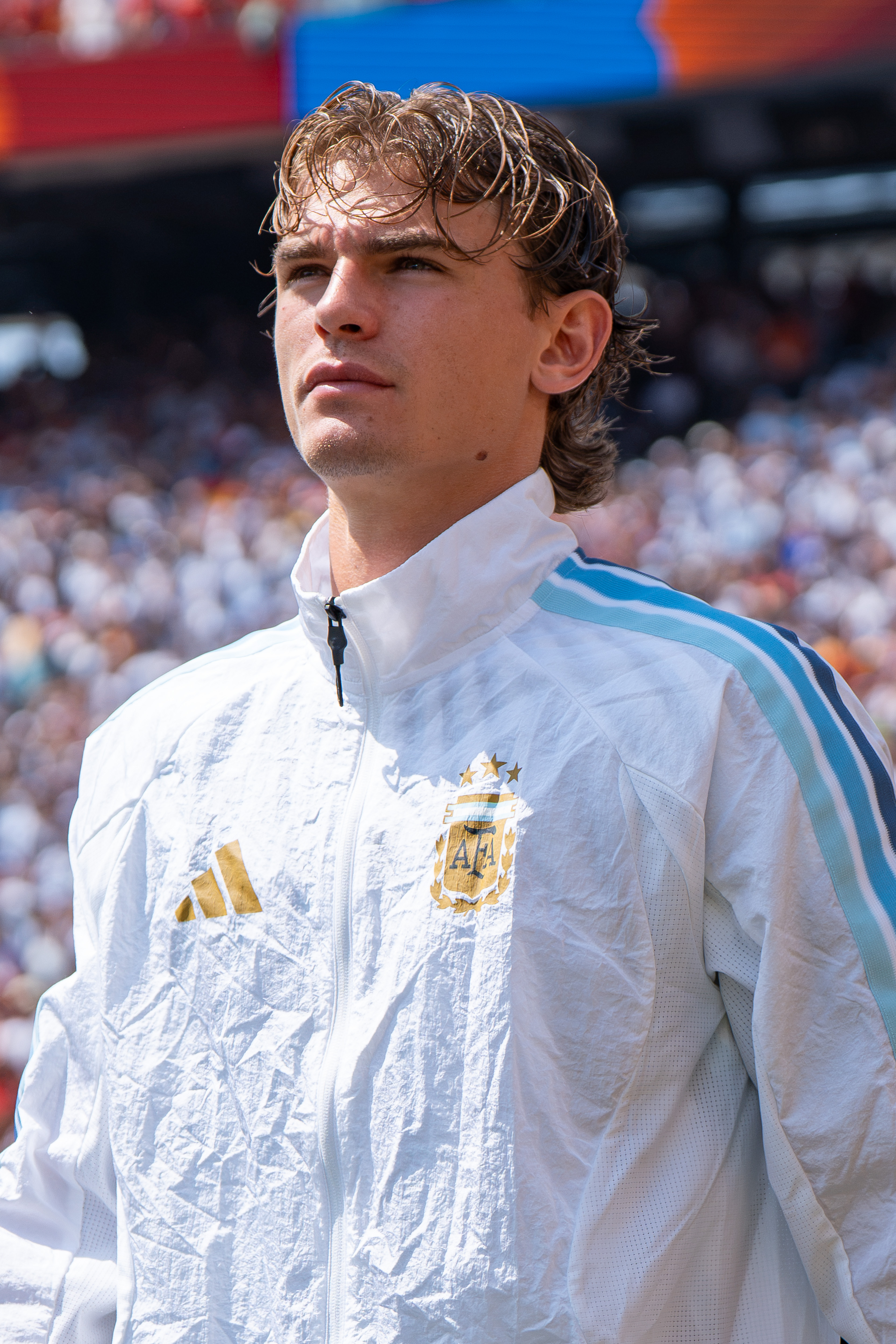
- Paz with Argentina in 2026

Personal information
- Full name: Nicolás Paz Martínez
- Date of birth: 8 September 2004 (age 22)
- Place of birth: Santa Cruz de Tenerife, Spain
- Height: 1.85 m (6 ft 1 in)
- Position: Attacking midfielder

Team information
- Current team: Como
- Number: 10

Youth career
- 2011–2014: San Juan
- 2014–2016: Tenerife
- 2016–2022: Real Madrid

Senior career*
Years	Team	Apps	(Gls)
2022–2024	Real Madrid B	49	(11)
2023–2024	Real Madrid	4	(0)
2024–	Como	81	(21)

International career^{‡}
2022–2023	Argentina U20	8	(4)
2024–	Argentina	16	(6)
Medal record
Men's football
Representing Argentina
FIFA World Cup
Runner-up	2026 Canada–Mexico–US
- * Club domestic league appearances and goals as of 22:31, 21 November 2026 (UTC) ‡ National team caps and goals as of 17 November 2026 (UTC)

Nicolás Paz Martínez (born 8 September 2004) is a professional footballer who plays as an attacking midfielder for Serie A club Como. Born in Spain, he plays for the Argentina national team.

== Club career ==
=== La Fábrica ===
A youth product of San Juan and Tenerife, Paz joined the Real Madrid's La Fábrica in 2016.

Initially starting his career as a central defender, Paz moved further up the pitch as he developed. After playing as a centre forward, he switched to the wing, where he played for the under-19 side. He is also comfortable operating as a central midfielder or playmaker.

=== Real Madrid ===
Paz made his senior debut for Real Madrid Castilla in a 3–1 win over Andorra in January 2022, coming on as an 82nd-minute substitute for Iván Morante.

On 8 November 2023, Paz made his first-team and Champions League debut for Real Madrid in a group stage match against Braga as a substitute in the 77th minute to replace Federico Valverde at the Santiago Bernabéu. On 11 November 2023, Paz made his La Liga debut in a 5–1 victory over Valencia, coming on as a substitute in the 82nd minute for Dani Carvajal. On 29 November, he scored his first goal in the Champions League, securing a 4–2 win against Napoli.

=== Como ===
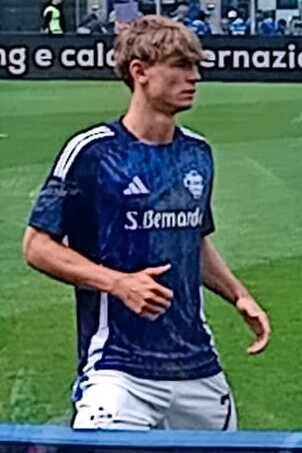
Paz with Como in 2025

On 25 August 2024, Paz signed for newly promoted Serie A club Como on a four-year deal. The following day, he made his debut for the club, coming on as a substitute in a 1–1 draw against Cagliari. On 19 October, he scored his first goal for Como in a 1–1 draw against Parma.

After registering six goals and nine assists in his debut season in Italy, Paz was named Best Under-23 player at the 2024–25 Serie A Awards. He was also included in the 23-man squad for Serie A Team of the Season.

Paz was assigned Como's #10 shirt ahead of the 2025–26 season. On 24 August, in the opening match of the Serie A season, Paz provided an assist and scored a goal from a free-kick to give Como a 2–0 win against Lazio. He continued his strong start to the season by scoring in the next two home matches against Genoa and Cremonese respectively, as well as assisting both of the team's goals in a 2–1 win at Fiorentina. This form saw him named Serie A's "Rising Star of the Month" for September 2025. On 19 October, Paz assisted Marc-Oliver Kempf's opening goal and scored his team's second as Como defeated Juventus for the first time since 1952. He concluded the 2025–26 season with 12 goals, as Como finished fourth to secure the club's first-ever qualification for the Champions League.

On 10 September 2026, Paz provided two assists in a 4–1 victory over RB Leipzig in the club's Champions League debut. A month later, on 21 October, he scored two goals and provided an assist in a 4–1 victory over Manchester United. At 22 years and 43 days old, he became the youngest player to both score and assist in a Champions League match against Manchester United since Alan Dzagoev in November 2009. He also became the second-youngest South American player to score against Manchester United in the competition's history, trailing only Lionel Messi's record from the 2009 Champions League final.

== International career ==
Paz with Argentina at the 2026 FIFA World Cup

Born in Santa Cruz de Tenerife, Canary Islands, to an Argentine father and a Spanish mother, Paz was eligible to represent both Spain and Argentina at international level. He was first called up to the senior Argentina national team in March 2022. Paz was also included in the Argentina under-20 squad for the 2022 Maurice Revello Tournament in France. He was then named in Argentina's preliminary 48-man squad for the 2022 FIFA World Cup in Qatar, but did not make the final cut.

On 15 October 2024, Paz made his senior debut for Argentina as a substitute in a 6–0 FIFA World Cup qualifying win over Bolivia, recording an assist for Lionel Messi. He scored his first international goal on 27 March 2026, converting a free kick in a 2–1 friendly win against Mauritania.

On 27 May 2026, despite a knee injury scare while playing for Como a few weeks prior, Paz was selected in Argentina's 26-man squad for the 2026 FIFA World Cup in Canada, Mexico and the United States. On 17 June, he made his World Cup debut in Argentina's 3–0 group stage win against Algeria, coming on as a substitute for Lionel Messi in the final ten minutes. Paz then started in Argentina's final group match against Jordan on 27 June, playing the first hour of a 3–1 victory. He would not make another appearance at the tournament, remaining an unused substitute in Argentina's five knockout stage matches as they went on to lose in the final against Spain, Paz's birth country.

== Style of play ==
Paz has been described as a modern "number 10" and has been praised for his dribbling, playmaking and shooting abilities.

== Personal life ==
Paz is the son of former Argentine international Pablo Paz, who played at the 1998 FIFA World Cup in France. His mother is Spanish.

== Career statistics ==
=== Club ===
As of match played 21 November 2026

Appearances and goals by club, season and competition
Club	Season	League			National cup (Note: Includes Copa del Rey, Coppa Italia)		Europe		Other		Total	
Club	Season	Division	Apps	Goals	Apps	Goals	Apps	Goals	Apps	Goals	Apps	Goals
Real Madrid Castilla	2021–22	Primera División RFEF	6	0	—		—		—		6	0
Real Madrid Castilla	2022–23	Primera Federación	14	1	—		—		4 (Note: Appearances in Primera Federación play-offs)	1	18	2
Real Madrid Castilla	2023–24	Primera Federación	29	10	—		—		—		29	10
Real Madrid Castilla	Total		49	11	—		—		4	1	53	12
Real Madrid	2023–24	La Liga	4	0	1	0	3 (Note: Appearances in UEFA Champions League)	1	0	0	8	1
Como	2024–25	Serie A	35	6	—		—		—		35	6
Como	2025–26	Serie A	35	12	5	1	—		—		40	13
Como	2026–27	Serie A	11	3	0	0	4	3	—		15	6
Como	Total		81	21	5	1	4	3	—		90	25
Career total			134	32	6	1	7	4	4	1	151	38

=== International ===
As of match played 17 November 2026

Appearances and goals by national team and year
National team	Year	Apps	Goals
Argentina	2024	1	0
Argentina	2025	5	0
Argentina	2026	10	6
Total		16	6

As of match played 17 November 2026
Scores and results list Argentina's goal tally first, score column indicates score after each Paz goal.

List of international goals scored by Nico Paz
No.	Date	Venue	Cap	Opponent	Score	Result	Competition
1	27 March 2026	La Bombonera, Buenos Aires, Argentina	7	Mauritania	2–0	2–1	Friendly
2	30 September 2026	Estadio Mario Alberto Kempes, Córdoba, Argentina	12	Bolivia	2–0	4–0	Friendly
3	3 October 2026	Estadio Monumental, Buenos Aires, Argentina	13	Burkina Faso	4–0	7–0	Friendly
4	6 October 2026	Estadio Monumental, Buenos Aires, Argentina	14	Benin	2–0	3–0	Friendly
5	17 November 2026	Estadio Mario Alberto Kempes, Córdoba, Argentina	16	Costa Rica	1–0	7–0	Friendly
6	17 November 2026	Estadio Mario Alberto Kempes, Córdoba, Argentina	16	Costa Rica	3–0	7–0	Friendly

== Honours ==
Real Madrid

- La Liga: 2023–24
- Supercopa de España: 2024
- UEFA Champions League: 2023–24

Argentina

- FIFA World Cup runner-up: 2026

Individual

- Serie A Best Under-23 Player: 2024–25
- EA Sports FC Serie A Team of the Season: 2024–25, 2025–26
- The Athletic Serie A Team of the Season: 2024–25
- Serie A Team of the Year: 2025–26
- Serie A Rising Star of the Month: August 2025, September 2025
- Serie A Best Midfielder: 2025–26
