= Scott McTominay =

Scotland international footballer (born 1996)

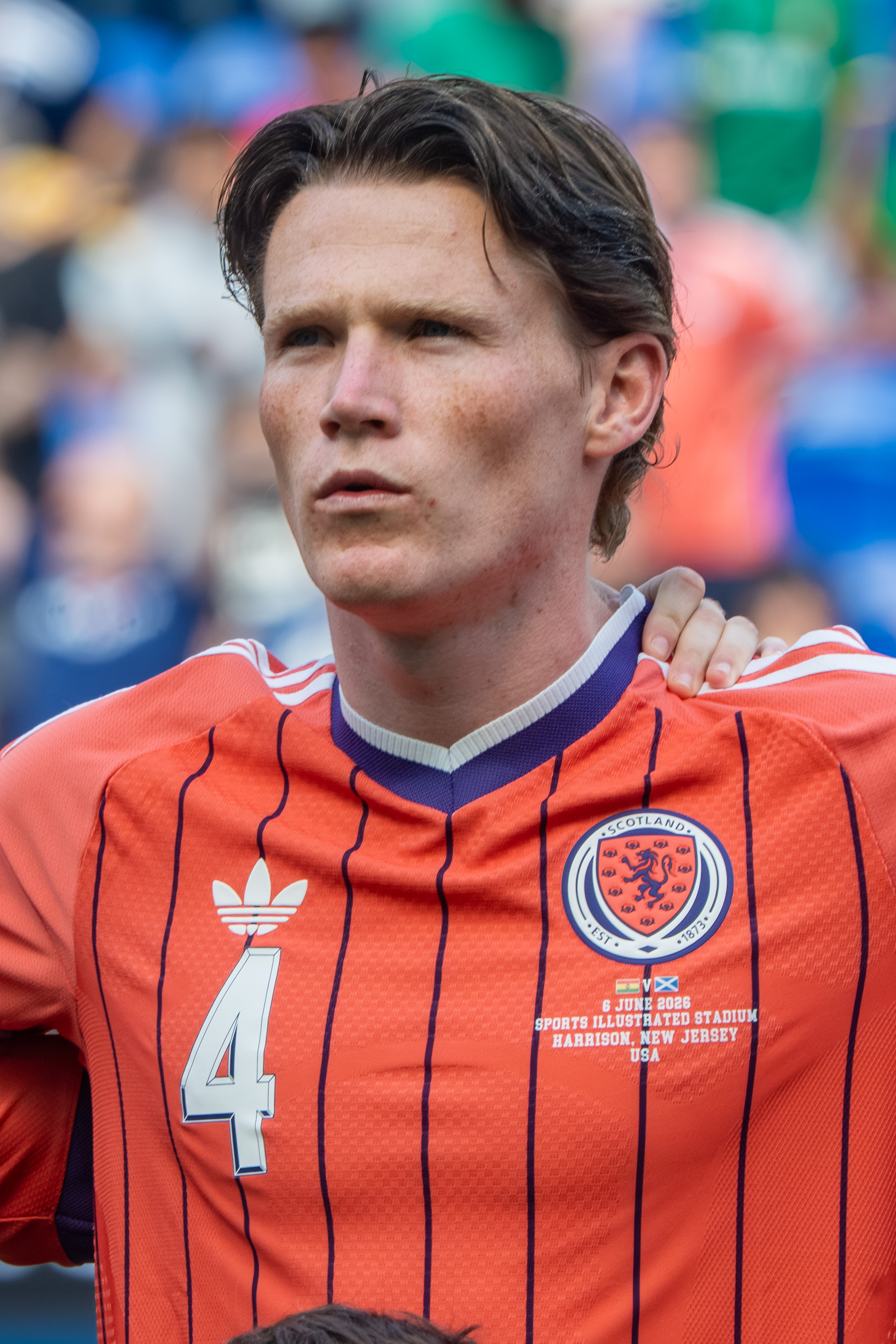
- McTominay with Scotland in 2026

Personal information
- Full name: Scott Francis McTominay
- Date of birth: 8 December 1996 (age 29)
- Place of birth: Lancaster, Lancashire, England
- Height: 6 ft 4 in (1.93 m)
- Position: Midfielder

Team information
- Current team: Napoli
- Number: 8

Youth career
- 2002–2017: Manchester United

Senior career*
Years	Team	Apps	(Gls)
2017–2024	Manchester United	178	(19)
2024–	Napoli	76	(25)

International career^{‡}
2018–	Scotland	75	(15)
- * Club domestic league appearances and goals as of 22:35, 21 November 2026 (UTC) ‡ National team caps and goals as of 22:50, 16 November 2026 (UTC)

Scott Francis McTominay (born 8 December 1996) is a professional footballer who plays as a midfielder for Serie A club Napoli. Born in England, he plays for the Scotland national team.

McTominay played for Manchester United's youth academy and made his senior debut for the club in May 2017. He went on to make more than 250 appearances for United, winning the FA Cup and the EFL Cup. In 2024, McTominay signed for Napoli in a £25.7 million transfer; he emerged as a focal player to the club winning the Serie A title in his debut season, being named the league's Most Valuable Player and receiving a nomination for the Ballon d'Or.

Born in Lancashire, England, McTominay qualified to play for Scotland through his father. He has been capped more than 70 times since making his senior international debut in March 2018, and has represented Scotland at Euro 2020, Euro 2024 and the 2026 World Cup.

== Club career ==
=== Manchester United ===
==== Youth career ====
McTominay was associated with the Manchester United academy from the age of five after attending the club's development centre in Preston. Although central midfield was viewed as his most natural position, he moved into the attack after there was a lack of a centre forward in the reserve team. He signed his first professional contract in July 2013.

He made seven appearances for the Under-18s between 2013 and 2015, but struggled due to his small size. McTominay missed most of the 2014–15 season due to injuries relating to growth and development issues, growing 14 inches in two years.

McTominay struggled again during the 2015–16 season, making 11 appearances across the Under-19s and Under-21s, but commanded a place in the team the following season with three goals in 21 games prior to his senior call-up.

==== 2016–17 season ====
On 30 April 2017, McTominay was named on the substitutes bench for a match against Swansea City in the Premier League. He made his first Premier League appearance on 7 May, coming on as a substitute against Arsenal, before starting Manchester United's final Premier League match of the season on 21 May, a 2–0 win at home to Crystal Palace.

==== 2017–18 season ====
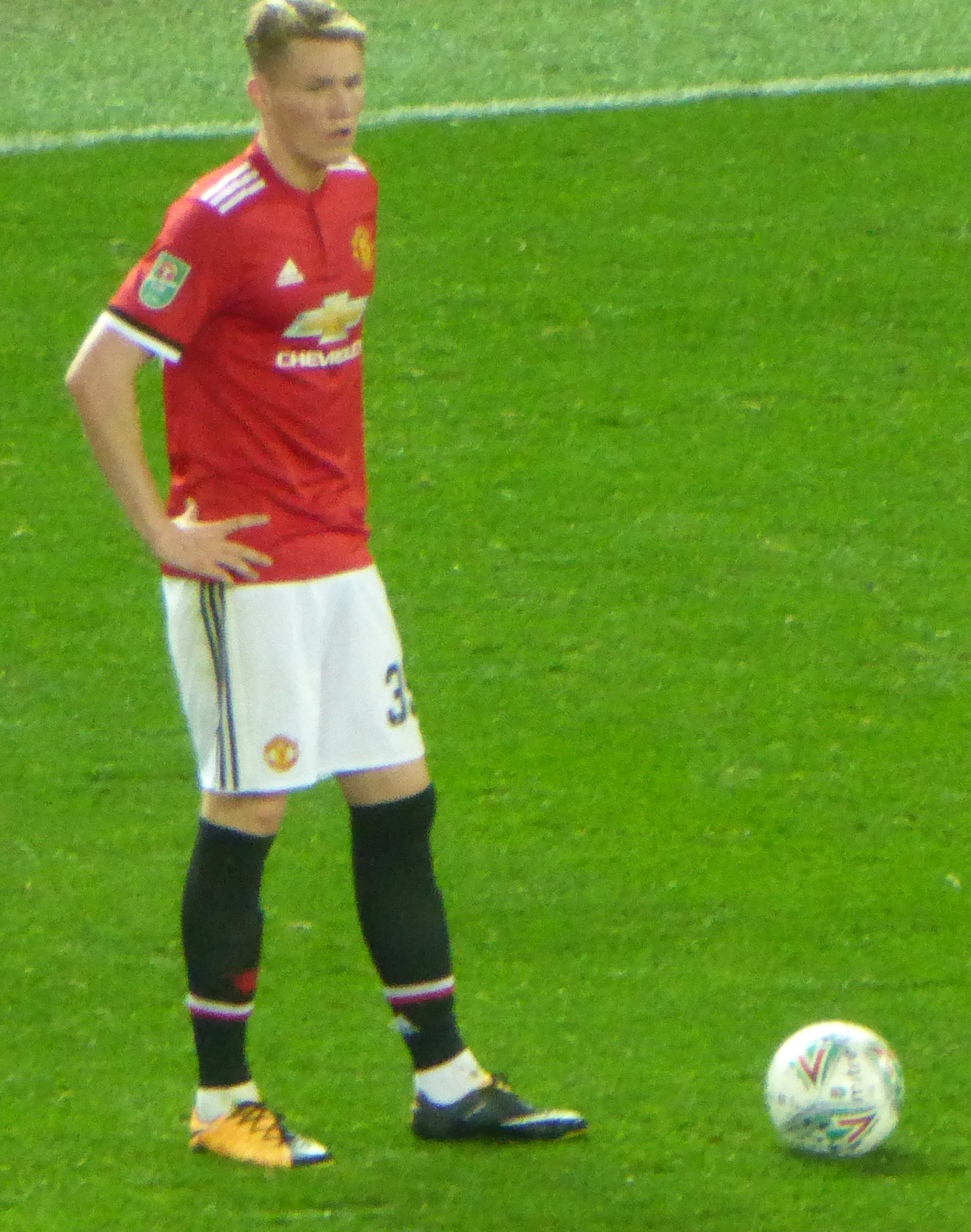
McTominay playing for Manchester United in 2017

Ahead of the 2017–18 season, McTominay was named as a member of Manchester United's touring party for their pre-season tour of the United States, as well as for matches against Vålerenga and Sampdoria. In the match against Vålerenga on 30 July 2017, McTominay came on as a substitute for Paul Pogba just after the hour mark, and 10 minutes later, he scored his first senior goal for the club – the third in a 3–0 win. McTominay made his first appearance of the season against Burton Albion in the EFL Cup on 20 September 2017, replacing Marcus Rashford in the 64th minute, in a 4–1 victory.

McTominay made his European debut on 18 October, against Benfica, coming on for Henrikh Mkhitaryan in injury-time, winning a free-kick and getting Luisão sent off before seeing out the 1–0 away win. Two days later, McTominay signed a new contract with United, keeping him at the club until June 2021, with an option to extend for a further year. He made his first start of the season on 24 October, in a 2–0 win over Swansea at Liberty Stadium in the EFL Cup fourth round.

==== 2018–19 season ====
On 21 January 2019, McTominay signed a contract extension, keeping him at United until 2023, with the option of another year. Replacing the injured Nemanja Matić, his first start of real significance under the management of Ole Gunnar Solskjær was against Liverpool on 24 February. McTominay was praised by pundits and reporters for his contributions in Champions League matches against Paris Saint-Germain and Barcelona. He scored his first competitive goal for United on 2 April 2019 in what was his 41st appearance for the club as they lost 2–1 to Wolverhampton Wanderers.

==== 2019–20 season ====
McTominay scored his first goal at Old Trafford in a 1–1 draw against Arsenal on 30 September 2019. On 27 October, McTominay scored United's 2,000th Premier League goal in a 3–1 victory against Norwich City at Carrow Road. McTominay was credited with another goal, scored against Brighton on 10 November, after United successfully appealed to a Premier League panel that it should not be designated as an own goal by Davy Pröpper.

McTominay suffered a knee ligament injury on 26 December, which prevented him from playing for two months. He resumed full training on 19 February 2020. On 27 February, McTominay scored his first European goal in United's UEFA Europa League Round of 32 second leg match against Club Brugge, with United winning 5–0 (6–1 on aggregate). On 8 March, he scored United's second goal in a 2–0 win at home to Manchester City, shooting into an empty net from 40 yards after a mistake by goalkeeper Ederson, to help United to their first league double over their city rivals in a decade.

On 23 June 2020, McTominay signed a new contract with Manchester United to keep him at the club until June 2025.

==== 2020–21 season ====
On 30 September 2020, McTominay scored his first goal of the season as United won 3–0 against Brighton & Hove Albion in the EFL Cup. On 20 December 2020, he scored his first league goals of the season, when he scored a brace inside 3 minutes in a 6–2 home win against Leeds United. This was the first time in the history of the Premier League that a player had scored twice in the opening three minutes of a game.

On 9 January 2021, McTominay became the stand-in captain in the FA Cup game against Watford and subsequently scored the only goal of the game inside five minutes as United won 1–0.

On 2 February 2021, McTominay scored a goal in Manchester United's Premier League record-equalling 9–0 home win against Southampton. Four days later, he followed this up by scoring in a 3–3 draw against Everton, making this his highest scoring season so far with six goals.

==== 2021–22 season ====
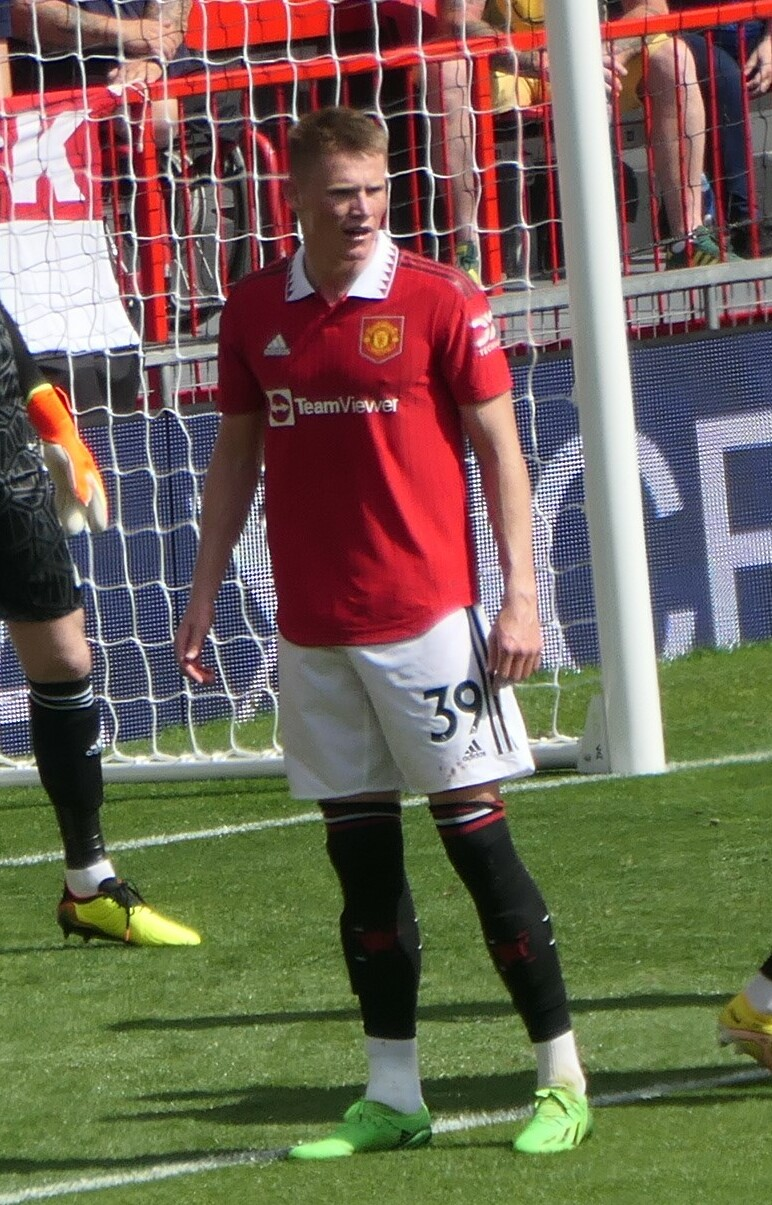
McTominay playing for Manchester United in 2022

On 30 December 2021, McTominay scored his first goal of the season when opened the scoring in a 3–1 win over Burnley.

On 10 January 2022, McTominay scored a goal against Aston Villa to help Manchester United advance into the fourth round of the 2021–22 FA Cup.

==== 2022–23 season ====
McTominay started games less frequently for United during the 2022–23 season than in previous years, following the signing of Casemiro as their first choice defensive midfielder. He won his first senior trophy on 26 February 2023, appearing as a substitute in the second half of the 2023 EFL Cup final against Newcastle United.

==== 2023–24 season ====
On 7 October 2023, after coming on as a substitute in the 87th minute, McTominay scored twice in stoppage time to give United a 2–1 comeback win against Brentford. On 29 November he scored his first UEFA Champions League goal away against Galatasaray in a 3–3 draw, before scoring a brace in the Premier League to beat Chelsea 2–1 the following week.

On 17 December, McTominay captained Manchester United for the first time in a Premier League match in a 0–0 draw with Liverpool at Anfield.

On 11 February 2024, McTominay scored the winning goal in a 2–1 away win against Aston Villa at Villa Park.

On 17 March 2024, McTominay scored the opening goal and assisted an extra-time equaliser from Marcus Rashford in a dramatic 4–3 win against Liverpool in the FA Cup quarter-finals. In the following semi-final against Coventry City, McTominay scored again to give United a 1–0 lead in the 23rd minute. In the FA Cup final, McTominay started as United beat rivals Manchester City 2–1.

=== Napoli ===
==== 2024–25: Serie A title ====
On 30 August 2024, McTominay ended a seven-year run with Manchester United and joined Serie A club Napoli. The deal was reportedly worth £25.7 million. On 26 September, he scored his first goal in a 5–0 win over Derby delle Due Sicilie rivals Palermo in the Coppa Italia. On 4 October, McTominay scored his first Serie A goal, scoring in just 25 seconds in a 3–1 win over Como.

On 27 April 2025, he scored both goals in a 2–0 victory against Torino to put Napoli at the top of the Serie A table. McTominay's five league goals in April saw him named Serie A Player of the Month, becoming the first Scottish player to win the award.

On 23 May, McTominay scored Napoli's first goal, a stunning acrobatic kick against Cagliari as they won 2–0 to secure the club's fourth Serie A title. He also won the Serie A MVP award for the 2024–25 season, as well as being included in the Serie A Team of the Season, marking his first season for the club as a success.

Following his first season, BBC Sport described McTominay as a "fan favourite" and "Napoli icon" with images of him having quickly become some of the most popular displayed around Naples. He had also gained the nickname "McFratm" (the literal translation of "McBrother") by the Napoli fanbase. He received a nomination for the prestigious Ballon d'Or award for his performances in the season.

==== 2025–26: Serie A runner-up ====
On 23 August 2025, the first Serie A matchday of the season, McTominay scored the first Napoli goal in this season via a header in the 34th minute against Sassuolo. Two months later on 25 October 2025, he scored against rivals Inter Milan to put Napoli at the top of the Serie A table via a first touch volley into the bottom corner. That goal was later credited as the Serie A Goal of the Month October 2025. On 22 December 2025 McTominay was part of the Napoli team that beat Bologna 2–0 to win the 2025–26 Supercoppa Italiana held in Riyadh.

==== 2026–27 season ====
McTominay playing for Napoli in the UEFA Champions League in 2026

On 1 September 2026, Napoli announced that McTominay would undergo corrective surgery using pulsed-field ablation (PFA) for a "mild benign arrhythmia". The procedure was expected to rule him out for Napoli's next four matches, including Serie A fixtures against Inter Milan and Bologna, as well as their Champions League match against Arsenal. He was expected to return after the international break. On 10 October 2026, McTominay returned to Serie A football following his heart surgery, as a substitute in a 3-0 home victory against Frosinone.

== International career ==
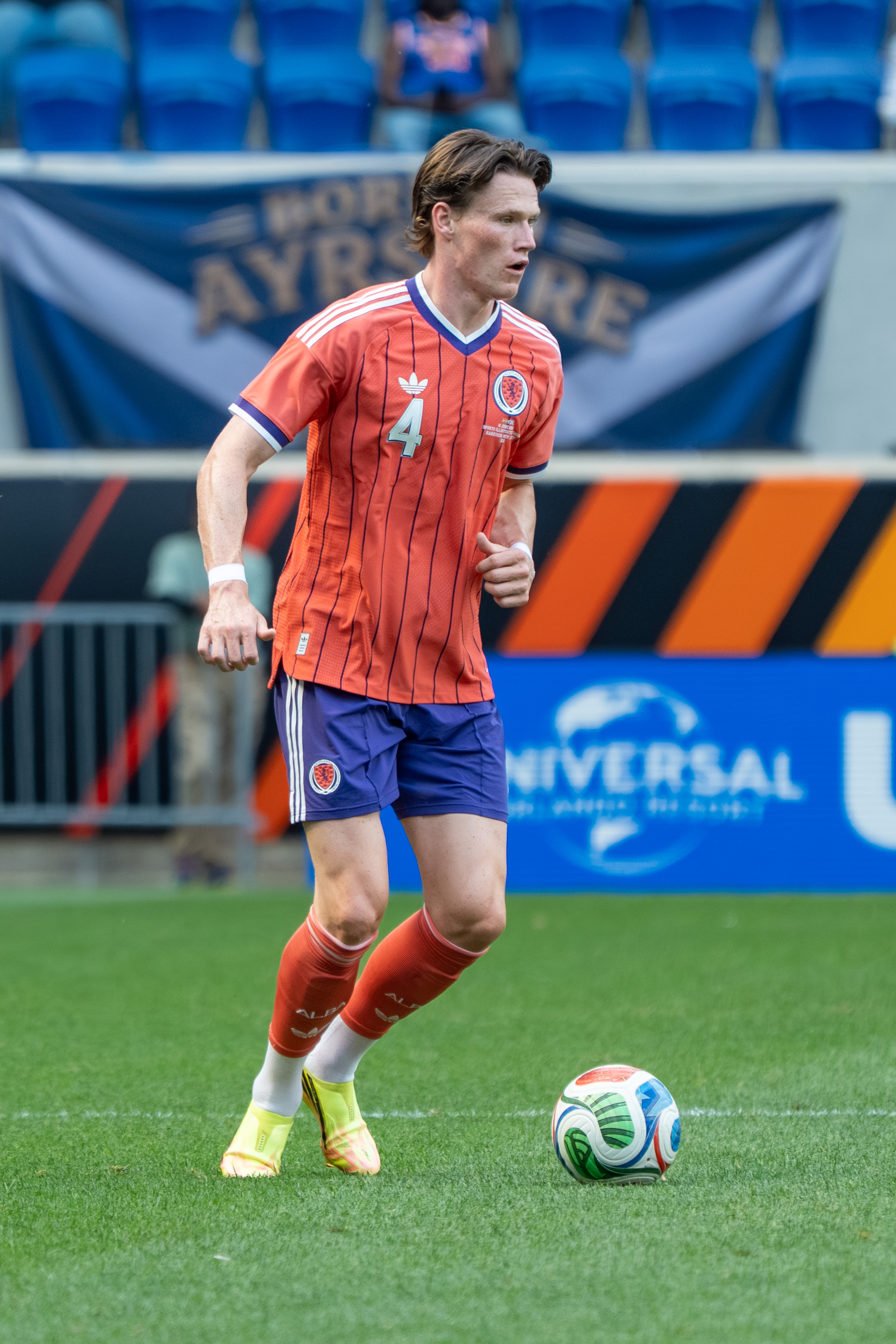
McTominay with Scotland in 2026

=== Eligibility ===
McTominay was born in England but qualifies for Scotland through his father, who is from Helensburgh. McTominay attended training camps with the Scottish youth sides. In November 2017, McTominay told Scottish Football Association performance director Malky Mackay that he wanted to concentrate on securing a place in the Manchester United first team.

Speaking in February 2018, club manager José Mourinho suggested that new Scotland manager Alex McLeish should select McTominay "because it looks like England is missing him". McTominay pledged his future to Scotland and was selected in their squad for two friendlies in March. Later that month, McTominay's grandfather said that Sir Alex Ferguson wanted him to represent Scotland. Manchester United academy coach Brian McClair explained "McLeish made a huge effort getting to Carrington to meet up with him, because it was in the middle of the bad weather that we had. He made it, put a case. Gareth Southgate sent him a text." McTominay said of the conversation with McLeish, "He travelled a hell of a long way to come and speak with me and I have to thank him for that. The conversation we had was relatively simple. I wanted to play for Scotland and I always have done since I was a young boy and it was an incredibly proud moment for me when he did call me up and hopefully I can kick on and do well."

=== Debut ===
On 23 March, McTominay was one of four players to be given their international debuts in McLeish's first game in charge. He played the first 57 minutes in a 1–0 friendly defeat to Costa Rica before being replaced by Stuart Armstrong. He made his first competitive appearance for Scotland in September 2018, as a 79th minute substitute for Callum McGregor in a 2–0 win against Albania. He was selected for international duty again in November 2019, but had to withdraw due to injury.

=== Euro 2020 ===
For the international games played in September 2020, McTominay was used as a centre-back in a three-man defence by head coach Steve Clarke. The Times commented that McTominay had the physique needed for the position, but had struggled to adapt to the role. He continued in this role during the October 2020 internationals, and the Daily Record said that there were indications that his play had improved. He converted his penalties in the shootouts against Israel and in the final playoff against Serbia, helping Scotland qualify for UEFA Euro 2020, their first tournament in 23 years.

McTominay was named in the squad for the Euro 2020 finals. He started all three Group D games against the Czech Republic, England and Croatia; however, Scotland failed to qualify for the knockout stages.

=== 2022 World Cup qualification ===
McTominay scored his first international goal on 9 October 2021, an injury-time winner against Israel in a 2022 World Cup qualifier.

=== Euro 2024 qualification ===
On 25 March 2023 McTominay scored two late goals in a 3–0 win over Cyprus in the first game of UEFA Euro 2024 qualifying. Three days later he scored another brace in a 2–0 win over Spain, his country's first win against that opponent since 1984. McTominay scored his fifth goal of the qualifying group during a 2–0 win against Georgia in June 2023. He then scored the first goal in a 3–0 away win at Cyprus, while also providing an assist for fellow midfielder John McGinn. He ended the qualification phase as Scotland's top-scorer with seven goals and the joint-fifth top scorer overall, only behind Romelu Lukaku, Cristiano Ronaldo, Kylian Mbappé and Harry Kane.

=== Euro 2024 ===
On 7 June 2024, McTominay was named in Scotland's squad for the UEFA Euro 2024 finals in Germany. A week later, he started the opening match of the tournament as Scotland lost 5–1 to hosts Germany; it was his 50th international appearance (teammate Ryan Christie also reached the milestone). On 19 June, he scored Scotland's goal (aided by a deflection from Fabian Schär) as they got their first point in a 1–1 draw in their second group match against Switzerland in Cologne. Aside from Antonio Rüdiger's own goal in the opening game, Scotland scored no other goals in the tournament as they were defeated 1–0 by Hungary in their third group game, in which McTominay played all 90 minutes.

=== 2026 World Cup qualification ===
On 18 November 2025, Scotland faced Denmark at Hampden in their final 2026 World Cup qualifier, needing a win to qualify automatically. McTominay opened the scoring in the third minute with a stunning overhead kick, a move which commentator Steven Thompson compared to basketball player Michael Jordan. That overhead kick has now been commemorated on a Scottish £20 bank note, and is depicted in a mural in Glasgow outside Hampden Park. The game finished 4–2 to Scotland, marking their first World Cup qualification since 1998.

McTominay gained his 70th cap in a 4–0 friendly win over Bolivia on 6 June 2026, and marked it with his 15th goal for his country, thus entering the all-time top 10 for both caps and goals.

=== 2026 World Cup and cardiac treatment ===
On 19 May 2026, McTominay was selected in the 26-man squad for the 2026 FIFA World Cup.

After arriving in the United States for the World Cup, the Scottish national team announced in the lead-in that McTominay had missed training due to an ongoing "stomach complaint". However in November 2026, the player revealed that he had to undergo a hospital procedure just two days before Scotland's opening match against Haiti where his heart was shocked to correct an irregular heart rhythm. This was prompted by the onset of symptoms which he had experienced during preparations for the World Cup.

McTominay went on to play in all three of Scotland's group matches, including in their 1-0 win against Haiti as well as their subsequent 1-0 loss to Morocco and 3-0 loss to Brazil. Criticism was levelled at the midfielder's performances by pundits and fans, who were at the time unaware of his hospitalisation.

After the opening two matches of the 2026/27 Serie A season, McTominay was later sidelined throughout September 2026 as he underwent a "minimally-invasive" cardiac ablation surgery in Manchester to correct his heart rhythm. McTominay has stated that the procedure was successful and he subsequently returned to training and playing for both Napoli and the Scottish national team shortly after recovering.

== Style of play ==
Primarily a midfielder, McTominay started in a more defensive role earlier in his career for Manchester United, being utilised by José Mourinho and Ole Gunnar Solskjær as a holding midfielder alongside Fred. Despite being enrolled in this position, McTominay is known for his ability to score goals from runs into the box, headers and volleys, as well as his physical defensive play and aerial ability. Since transferring to Napoli, he has been enrolled in an attacking role, becoming one of their dominant attacking forces in the process.

== Career statistics ==
=== Club ===
As of match played 21 November 2026

Appearances and goals by club, season and competition
Club	Season	League			National cup (Note: Includes FA Cup, Coppa Italia)		League cup (Note: Includes EFL Cup)		Europe		Other		Total	
Club	Season	Division	Apps	Goals	Apps	Goals	Apps	Goals	Apps	Goals	Apps	Goals	Apps	Goals
Manchester United	2016–17	Premier League	2	0	0	0	0	0	0	0	0	0	2	0
Manchester United	2017–18	Premier League	13	0	3	0	3	0	4 (Note: Appearances in UEFA Champions League)	0	0	0	23	0
Manchester United	2018–19	Premier League	16	2	3	0	0	0	3	0	—		22	2
Manchester United	2019–20	Premier League	27	4	2	0	1	0	7 (Note: Appearances in UEFA Europa League)	1	—		37	5
Manchester United	2020–21	Premier League	32	4	4	2	2	1	11 (Note: Five appearances in UEFA Champions League, six appearances in UEFA Europa League)	0	—		49	7
Manchester United	2021–22	Premier League	30	1	2	1	0	0	5	0	—		37	2
Manchester United	2022–23	Premier League	24	1	4	0	4	1	7	1	—		39	3
Manchester United	2023–24	Premier League	32	7	6	2	0	0	5	1	—		43	10
Manchester United	2024–25	Premier League	2	0	—		—		—		1 (Note: Appearance in FA Community Shield)	0	3	0
Manchester United	Total		178	19	24	5	10	2	42	3	1	0	255	29
Napoli	2024–25	Serie A	34	12	2	1	—		—		—		36	13
Napoli	2025–26	Serie A	33	10	1	0	—		8	4	2 (Note: Appearances in Supercoppa Italiana)	0	44	14
Napoli	2026–27	Serie A	9	3	0	0	—		3	3	—		12	6
Napoli	Total		76	25	3	1	—		11	7	2	0	92	33
Career total			254	44	27	6	10	2	53	10	3	0	347	62

=== International ===
As of match played 16 November 2026

Appearances and goals by national team and year
National team	Year	Apps	Goals
Scotland	2018	5	0
Scotland	2019	7	0
Scotland	2020	7	0
Scotland	2021	9	1
Scotland	2022	9	0
Scotland	2023	10	7
Scotland	2024	11	3
Scotland	2025	9	3
Scotland	2026	8	1
Total		75	15

Scores and results list Scotland's goal tally first, score column indicates score after each McTominay goal

List of international goals scored by Scott McTominay
No.	Date	Venue	Cap	Opponent	Score	Result	Competition
1	9 October 2021	Hampden Park, Glasgow, Scotland	27	Israel	3–2	3–2	2022 FIFA World Cup qualification
2	25 March 2023	Hampden Park, Glasgow, Scotland	38	Cyprus	2–0	3–0	UEFA Euro 2024 qualifying
3	25 March 2023	Hampden Park, Glasgow, Scotland	38	Cyprus	3–0	3–0	UEFA Euro 2024 qualifying
4	28 March 2023	Hampden Park, Glasgow, Scotland	39	Spain	1–0	2–0	UEFA Euro 2024 qualifying
5	28 March 2023	Hampden Park, Glasgow, Scotland	39	Spain	2–0	2–0	UEFA Euro 2024 qualifying
6	20 June 2023	Hampden Park, Glasgow, Scotland	41	Georgia	2–0	2–0	UEFA Euro 2024 qualifying
7	8 September 2023	AEK Arena, Larnaca, Cyprus	42	Cyprus	1–0	3–0	UEFA Euro 2024 qualifying
8	16 November 2023	Dinamo Arena, Tbilisi, Georgia	46	Georgia	1–1	2–2	UEFA Euro 2024 qualifying
9	19 June 2024	RheinEnergieStadion, Cologne, Germany	51	Switzerland	1–0	1–1	UEFA Euro 2024
10	5 September 2024	Hampden Park, Glasgow, Scotland	53	Poland	2–2	2–3	2024–25 UEFA Nations League A
11	8 September 2024	Estádio da Luz, Lisbon, Portugal	54	Portugal	1–0	1–2	2024–25 UEFA Nations League A
12	20 March 2025	Karaiskakis Stadium, Piraeus, Greece	59	Greece	1–0	1–0	2024–25 UEFA Nations League promotion/relegation play-offs
13	12 October 2025	Hampden Park, Glasgow, Scotland	65	Belarus	2–0	2–1	2026 FIFA World Cup qualification
14	18 November 2025	Hampden Park, Glasgow, Scotland	67	Denmark	1–0	4–2	2026 FIFA World Cup qualification
15	6 June 2026	Sports Illustrated Stadium, Harrison, United States	70	Bolivia	2–0	4–0	Friendly

== Honours ==
Manchester United

- FA Cup: 2023–24; runner-up: 2017–18, 2022–23
- EFL Cup: 2022–23
- UEFA Europa League runner-up: 2020–21

Napoli

- Serie A: 2024–25
- Supercoppa Italiana: 2025–26

Individual

- Manchester United Manager's Player of the Year: 2017–18
- UEFA Europa League Squad of the Season: 2020–21
- Serie A Most Valuable Player: 2024–25
- Serie A Player of the Month: April 2025
- Serie A Goal of the Month: May 2025, October 2025, February 2026
- EA Sports FC Serie A Team of the Season: 2024–25, 2025–26
- The Athletic Serie A Team of the Season: 2024–25
- Serie A Team of the Year: 2024–25, 2025–26
- Serie A Footballer of the Year: 2024–25

== See also ==
- List of Scotland international footballers born outside Scotland
