= Dušan Vlahović =

Serbian footballer (born 2000)

- Vlahović in 2026

Personal information
- Full name: Dušan Vlahović
- Date of birth: 28 January 2000 (age 26)
- Place of birth: Belgrade, Serbia, FR Yugoslavia
- Height: 1.90 m (6 ft 3 in)
- Position: Striker

Team information
- Current team: Beşiktaş
- Number: 28

Youth career
- 2010–2014: OFK Beograd
- 2014–2016: Partizan

Senior career*
Years	Team	Apps	(Gls)
2016–2018	Partizan	21	(1)
2018–2022	Fiorentina	98	(44)
2022–2026	Juventus	123	(50)
2026–	Beşiktaş	10	(11)

International career^{‡}
2016–2019	Serbia U19	8	(6)
2019	Serbia U21	3	(0)
2020–	Serbia	41	(16)
- * Club domestic league appearances and goals as of 23:25, 22 November 2026 (UTC) ‡ National team caps and goals as of 23:15, 13 November 2025 (UTC)

Dušan Vlahović (Serbian Cyrillic: Душан Влаховић; born 28 January 2000) is a Serbian professional footballer who plays as a striker for Süper Lig club Beşiktaş and the Serbia national team.

Graduating from Partizan's youth system, Vlahović made his first-team debut in 2016, winning a league title and two Serbian Cups. He moved to Italian club Fiorentina in 2018. With 21 league goals in the 2020–21 Serie A, Vlahović was awarded Serie A Best Young Player. After an impressive goalscoring form in the first half of 2021–22, Italian rivals Juventus signed him in January 2022 for a reported fee of €70 million. He won the Coppa Italia with the club in 2024, scoring the only goal in the final. In 2026, he joined Turkish side Beşiktaş on free transfer.

Vlahović is a former Serbia youth international, representing his country at various youth levels, before making his senior international debut in 2020, during the UEFA Nations League.

== Club career ==
=== Early career ===
Born in Belgrade, Vlahović started playing football in the Altina Zemun football school, where he competed mostly with older players. Shortly after, he joined OFK Beograd's youth system for three months, and also made one appearance for Red Star Belgrade.

=== Partizan ===
In summer 2014, Vlahović ended up joining rivals Partizan. He signed his first professional contract with Partizan in 2015 at the age of 15. In early 2016, Vlahović joined the first team under coach Ivan Tomić and was given the jersey number 9. He made his Serbian SuperLiga debut on 21 February against OFK Beograd, as the Partizan's youngest debutant in history.

On 2 April, Vlahović scored his first career goal for Partizan against Radnik Surdulica in a 3–2 home victory, and became the youngest scorer in club history. He also scored a goal in a semi-final cup match against Spartak Subotica on 20 April, winning 3–0 away. He was scouted by multiple established European teams, including Arsenal, Anderlecht and Juventus with Partizan declining all offers. Vlahović scored a goal in the 2015–16 Serbian Cup final against Javor Ivanjica, helping his side win 2–0.

Vlahović played his first match in the new season against Zagłębie Lubin on 21 July, in the second leg of the 2016–17 UEFA Europa League second qualifying round; it was his European debut for Partizan. Vlahović started his first match in the second fixture of the 2016–17 league season, in an away match against Napredak Kruševac.

=== Fiorentina ===
==== 2018–2019: First seasons and development ====
In June 2017, Vlahović signed a five-year preliminary contract with Fiorentina, which became official on his 18th birthday, on 28 January 2018. Vlahović was officially bought by Fiorentina on 22 February 2018, choosing to wear the number 18. Due to administrative norms, he was not available to play until 1 July 2018. Initially registered to Fiorentina's under-19s, Vlahović, aged 18, made his senior debut for Fiorentina on 25 September 2018, in a 2–1 Serie A defeat to Inter Milan; in the process, he became the first player born in the 2000s to represent the club. On 9 December, he became the first player born in the 2000s to start for the Viola, featuring in a 3–3 away draw to Sassuolo. He made 10 appearances with the first team in the 2018–19 season. During that season, Vlahović won the 2018–19 Coppa Italia Primavera, scoring a brace against Torino in the first leg of the final, and a penalty in the second leg.

In the following season, Vlahović was de facto included in the first team. On 18 August 2019, Vlahović scored his first goals with Fiorentina, a brace in a 3–1 win against Monza in the third round of the 2019–20 Coppa Italia. His first goals came on 10 November, scoring a brace in a 5–2 away defeat against Cagliari. Vlahović ended the season with eight goals in 34 appearances.

==== 2020–2022: Breakthrough and Serie A Best Young Player ====
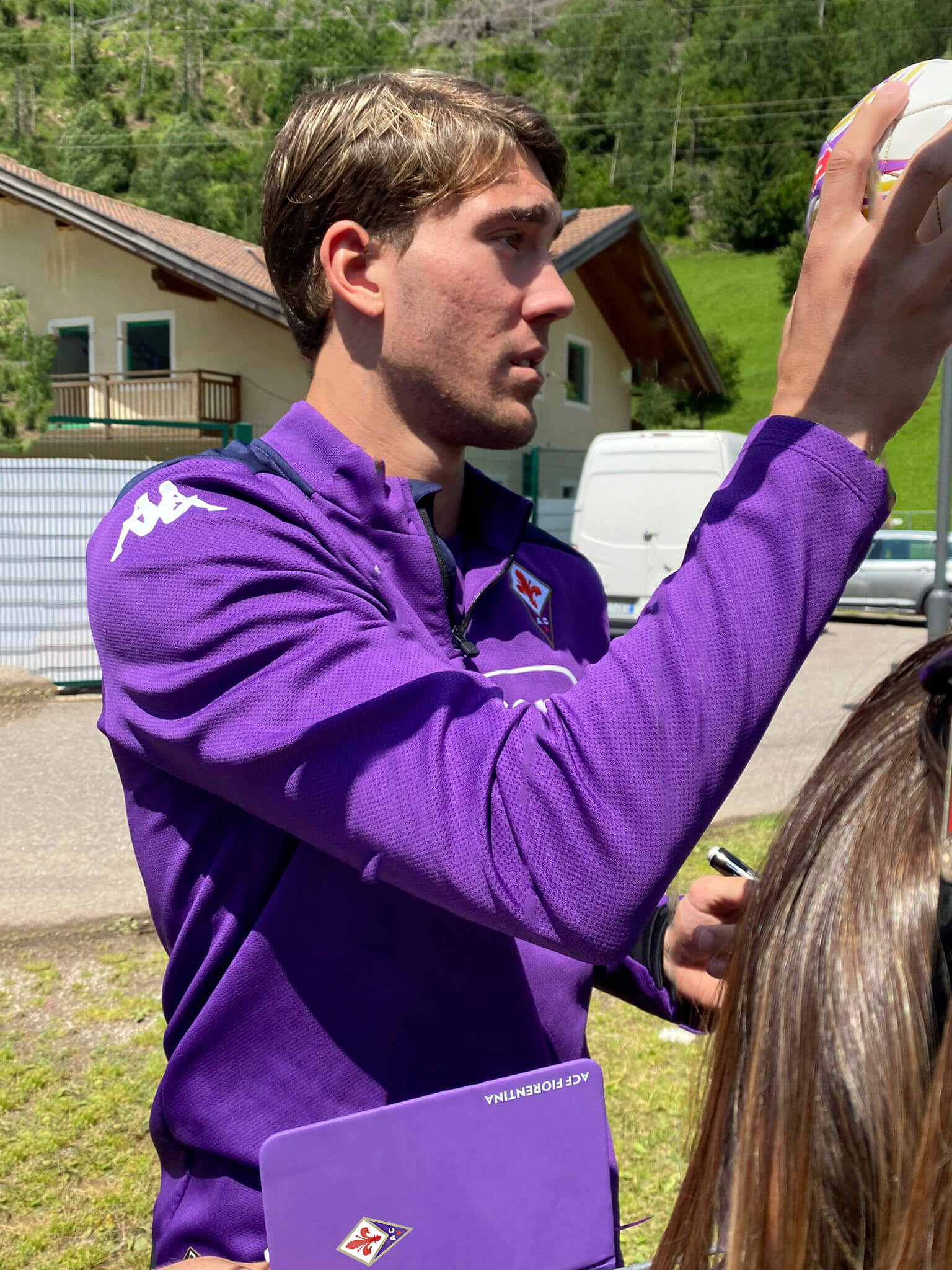
Vlahović with Fiorentina in 2021

In the 2020–21 season, Vlahović found more and more space as a starter, especially after the arrival of Cesare Prandelli at the helm of Fiorentina. On 22 December 2020, he contributed with a goal to Fiorentina's away win in Turin over Juventus (3–0), which marked the first victory of the Viola at the home of the Bianconeri after 12 years. On 13 March 2021, Vlahović scored his first career hat-trick in a 4–1 away win over Benevento. He ended the year with 21 total goals, winning the title of Serie A Best Young Player.

Vlahović started the 2021–22 season by scoring a brace in a 4–0 win against Cosenza in the first round of the 2021–22 Coppa Italia. On 31 October 2021, he scored a hat-trick in a 3–0 victory over Spezia. On 19 December 2021, Vlahović scored his 33rd Serie A goal of the calendar year; he became the only player, alongside Cristiano Ronaldo in 2020, to do so since 1951. In his previous season-and-a-half at Fiorentina, Vlahović scored 38 league goals, more than any other active player in the same time period. He was also the only player in Europe's top-five leagues born after 2000, alongside Erling Haaland, to have scored at least 40 goals in Europe's top-five leagues.

=== Juventus ===
==== 2022–2023: Debut and immediate impact ====
Vlahović in 2024

Media reports centred heavily on Arsenal's pursuit of Vlahović. However, on 28 January 2022, his 22nd birthday, Vlahović signed for Juventus on a four-and-a-half-year contract; in a contract was worth €70 million, plus €10 million in performance-related bonuses, making him the most expensive transfer in the Serie A winter transfer window. Fiorentina president Rocco Comisso in an interview later remarked of Vlahović's agents "it was clear to everyone they already had a deal with someone", alluding that his entourage had already given a secret agreement with Juventus in the months prior. He chose to wear the number 7 jersey, previously worn by Cristiano Ronaldo. He debuted for Juventus as a starter on 6 February, and scored the opening goal in a 2–0 win against Hellas Verona. On 22 February, Vlahović made his first appearance in the UEFA Champions League, a 1–1 away draw against Villarreal. He scored after only 33 seconds, becoming the fastest starting debutant and the second-youngest Juventus debutant to score in the Champions League. Four days later, he scored his first brace for Juventus, helping his side win 3–2 away to Empoli.

On 16 April 2022, Vlahović became the second-youngest non-Italian player to score 50 goals in Serie A, after Alexandre Pato, with his late equaliser in a 1–1 draw against Bologna. On 11 May, he scored a 52nd-minute goal in Juventus' 4–2 loss to Inter in the 2022 Coppa Italia Final, which had given Juventus the lead. Despite losing the final, Vlahović finished as the top scorer of the competition with four goals, with the other three being scored during his time with Fiorentina. Five days later, he scored his 24th goal of the season in the 2–2 home draw against Lazio, to become the highest-scoring Serbian footballer in Serie A history, alongside Dejan Stanković.

On 1 July 2022, Vlahović changed his jersey number from 7 to 9, ahead of the 2022–23 season. On matchday one of the Serie A, on 15 August, he scored a brace in a 3–0 home win over Sassuolo. Vlahović had difficult start to the new season, suffering from multiple hamstring injuries, which limited his game time. However, having recovered halfway through the season, he scored Juventus' goal in a 1–1 home draw against Nantes in the Europa League play-off round.

==== 2024–2026: Renewed form and Coppa Italia win ====
On 15 May 2024, Vlahović scored the only goal in a 1–0 victory over Atalanta in the Coppa Italia final, clinching his first trophy at the club.

On 16 September 2025, Vlahović scored two late goals in a 4–4 draw in the Champions League opener against Borussia Dortmund. On 29 November 2025, Vlahović suffered an adductor strain in a 2–1 home win against Cagliari. He returned to action against Sassuolo on 21 March 2026, following an absence of nearly four months. He featured on the final matchday of the 2025–26 season, scoring twice in a 2–2 away draw against Torino. Subsequently, Vlahović left Juventus as a free agent after the club and the player failed to reach an agreement over a contract extension due to differences in salary demands.

=== Beşiktaş ===
Vlahović with Beşiktaş in 2026

On 12 August 2026, Vlahović moved to Turkey and joined Süper Lig side Beşiktaş on a three-year deal. Hence, he reunited with his former coach at Fiorentina, Vincenzo Italiano. Later that month, on 31 August, he scored his first goals for the club, netting a hat-trick in a 6–2 victory over Çorum.

== International career ==
=== Youth ===
Vlahović was a member of the Serbia national under-15 team, scoring a hat trick in a match against the Czech Republic on 16 April 2015. He was also called up to the under-16 squad in late 2015, making his debut against Poland on 27 October 2015. In August 2016, Vlahović was called up to the under-19 squad for the Stevan Vilotić memorial tournament, where he debuted in the opening match against the United States. In the second match of the same tournament, he scored a goal against France. After Serbia beat Israel in the final match, Vlahović was nominated for the most talented player of the tournament.

=== Senior ===
On 11 October 2020, Vlahović debuted for the Serbian senior team in a 2020–21 UEFA Nations League game against Hungary. The same year on 18 November, he scored his first international goal in a 5–0 home victory over Russia in the Nations League. On 12 October 2021, Vlahović embarked on a prolific goalscoring form for his national team with his four goals, including a brace against Azerbaijan, proving to be crucial as Serbia secured qualification to the 2022 FIFA World Cup on top of their qualifying group ahead of the former European champions, Portugal, after defeating them 2–1 away from home. In November 2022, Vlahović was selected in Serbia's squad for the 2022 FIFA World Cup in Qatar. He played in group stage matches against Brazil and Switzerland, scoring against the latter in a 3–2 loss, as Serbia finished bottom of their group. Vlahović was selected in Serbia's squad for the UEFA Euro 2024, playing in all three group stage matches until Serbia was eliminated by finishing fourth in the group.

== Style of play ==
Vlahović is a complete striker, known for his physicality, technique and eye for goal. He excels at picking up the ball in central areas or the inside right or left channels and maintaining possession. He has multiple facets to his hold up and link play. His best assets are his strength to hold up the ball, and then his ability to turn and dribble past the first defender. When playing for Fiorentina, he often received the ball under pressure from either a long ball or linking with his midfielders.

Vlahović is an efficient ball carrier, and his primary way to retain possession and circulate the ball is to use his strength in the contact and to use his superior dribbling ability to evade his marker. He is able to draw in opposition defenders and create space for his teammates or for himself with dribbling. Vlahović is productive in the penalty box and noted for his finishing in the penalty area, as he is able to hold his position in order to pin the opposition back into their box, before swiftly making a movement into the channels as his team look to locate areas within the final third. His playing style has led him to be compared to Cristiano Ronaldo, Erling Haaland and Jamie Vardy.

== Personal life ==
Vlahović's idols are Zlatan Ibrahimović and Cristiano Ronaldo. He follows MotoGP and has also played basketball since 2004.

Vlahović formerly dated Miss Italia 2019 Carolina Stramare from 2022 to 2023, and has since been in a relationship with childhood friend Vanja Bogdanovic since 2024.

== Career statistics ==
=== Club ===
As of match played 22 November 2026

Appearances and goals by club, season and competition
Club	Season	League			National cup (Note: Includes Serbian Cup, Coppa Italia)		Europe		Other		Total	
Club	Season	Division	Apps	Goals	Apps	Goals	Apps	Goals	Apps	Goals	Apps	Goals
Partizan	2015–16	Serbian SuperLiga	14	1	4	2	—		—		18	3
Partizan	2016–17	Serbian SuperLiga	7	0	1	0	1 (Note: Appearance in UEFA Europa League)	0	—		9	0
Partizan	2017–18	Serbian SuperLiga	0	0	0	0	0	0	—		0	0
Partizan	Total		21	1	5	2	1	0	—		27	3
Fiorentina	2018–19	Serie A	10	0	0	0	—		—		10	0
Fiorentina	2019–20	Serie A	30	6	4	2	—		—		34	8
Fiorentina	2020–21	Serie A	37	21	3	0	—		—		40	21
Fiorentina	2021–22	Serie A	21	17	3	3	—		—		24	20
Fiorentina	Total		98	44	10	5	—		—		108	49
Juventus	2021–22	Serie A	15	7	4	1	2 (Note: Appearances in UEFA Champions League)	1	—		21	9
Juventus	2022–23	Serie A	27	10	2	0	13 (Note: Five appearances and one goal in UEFA Champions League, eight appearances and three goals in UEFA Europa League)	4	—		42	14
Juventus	2023–24	Serie A	33	16	5	2	—		—		38	18
Juventus	2024–25	Serie A	29	10	2	1	9	4	4 (Note: One appearance in Supercoppa Italiana, three appearances and two goals in FIFA Club World Cup)	2	44	17
Juventus	2025–26	Serie A	19	7	0	0	4	3	—		23	10
Juventus	Total		123	50	13	4	28	12	4	2	168	68
Beşiktaş	2026–27	Süper Lig	10	11	0	0	2	0	—		12	11
Career total			252	105	28	11	31	12	4	2	315	130

=== International ===
As of match played 13 November 2025

Appearances and goals by national team and year
National team	Year	Apps	Goals
Serbia	2020	4	1
Serbia	2021	10	6
Serbia	2022	5	3
Serbia	2023	6	3
Serbia	2024	7	0
Serbia	2025	9	3
Total		41	16

Scores and results list Serbia's goal tally first, score column indicates score after each Vlahović goal.

List of international goals scored by Dušan Vlahović
No.	Date	Venue	Cap	Opponent	Score	Result	Competition
1	18 November 2020	Rajko Mitić Stadium, Belgrade, Serbia	4	Russia	3–0	5–0	2020–21 UEFA Nations League B
2	24 March 2021	Rajko Mitić Stadium, Belgrade, Serbia	5	Republic of Ireland	1–1	3–2	2022 FIFA World Cup qualification
3	1 September 2021	Nagyerdei Stadion, Debrecen, Hungary	8	Qatar	3–0	4–0	Friendly
4	9 October 2021	Stade de Luxembourg, Luxembourg City, Luxembourg	11	Luxembourg	1–0	1–0	2022 FIFA World Cup qualification
5	12 October 2021	Rajko Mitić Stadium, Belgrade, Serbia	12	Azerbaijan	1–0	3–1	2022 FIFA World Cup qualification
6	12 October 2021	Rajko Mitić Stadium, Belgrade, Serbia	12	Azerbaijan	2–1	3–1	2022 FIFA World Cup qualification
7	11 November 2021	Rajko Mitić Stadium, Belgrade, Serbia	13	Qatar	3–0	4–0	Friendly
8	27 September 2022	Ullevaal Stadion, Oslo, Norway	16	Norway	1–0	2–0	2022–23 UEFA Nations League B
9	18 November 2022	Al Muharraq Stadium, Arad, Bahrain	17	Bahrain	3–1	5–1	Friendly
10	2 December 2022	Stadium 974, Doha, Qatar	19	Switzerland	2–1	2–3	2022 FIFA World Cup
11	24 March 2023	Rajko Mitić Stadium, Belgrade, Serbia	20	Lithuania	2–0	2–0	UEFA Euro 2024 qualifying
12	27 March 2023	Podgorica City Stadium, Podgorica, Montenegro	21	Montenegro	1–0	2–0	UEFA Euro 2024 qualifying
13	27 March 2023	Podgorica City Stadium, Podgorica, Montenegro	21	Montenegro	2–0	2–0	UEFA Euro 2024 qualifying
14	23 March 2025	Rajko Mitić Stadium, Belgrade, Serbia	34	Austria	2–0	2–0	2024–25 UEFA Nations League promotion/relegation play-offs
15	6 September 2025	Daugava Stadium, Riga, Latvia	37	Latvia	1–0	1–0	2026 FIFA World Cup qualification
16	14 October 2025	Estadi de la FAF, Encamp, Andorra	40	Andorra	2–1	3–1	2026 FIFA World Cup qualification

== Honours ==
Partizan

- Serbian SuperLiga: 2016–17
- Serbian Cup: 2015–16, 2016–17

Fiorentina Primavera

- Coppa Italia Primavera: 2018–19

Juventus

- Coppa Italia: 2023–24

Individual

- Serie A Best Under-23: 2020–21
- Serie A Player of the Month: December 2021, January 2024
- Coppa Italia top scorer: 2021–22 (4 goals)
- Serie A Team of the Year: 2021–22
- Serie A Best Striker: 2023–24
- Serbian Footballer of the Year: 2024
