= Serie A Rising Star of the Month =

Serie A monthly award

Nico Paz was the inaugural recipient of the award in August 2025.

The Serie A Rising Star of the Month is an association football award that recognises the best under-23 player each month in Serie A, the top tier of the Italian football league system. The winner of the award is selected based on analysis by data tracking software, which evaluates statistical and positional data, as well as the player's contribution to the team's technical and physical efficiency.

Introduced for the 2025–26 season, the inaugural award was presented to Como player Nico Paz for his performances in August 2025.

The current holder of the award is Monza's Gustavo Varela, who won it for his performances in October 2026.

== List of winners ==
List of Serie A Rising Star of the Month winners
| Month | Player | Club | Ref. |
2025–26 season
| August 2025 | (Argentina) Nico Paz | Como | |
| September 2025 | (Argentina) Nico Paz | Como | |
| October 2025 | (France) Ange-Yoan Bonny | Inter Milan | |
| November 2025 | (Turkey) Kenan Yıldız | Juventus | |
| December 2025 | (Denmark) Rasmus Højlund | Napoli | |
| January 2026 | (Croatia) Martin Baturina | Como | |
| February 2026 | (Italy) Antonio Vergara | Napoli | |
| March 2026 | (Turkey) Kenan Yıldız | Juventus | |
| April 2026 | (France) Arthur Atta | Udinese | |
| May 2026 | (Italy) Niccolò Pisilli | Roma | |
2026–27 season
| Aug.–Sep. 2026 | (Italy) Antonio Raimondo | Frosinone | |
| October 2026 | (Portugal) Gustavo Varela | Monza | |

== Multiple winners ==
The following table lists the number of awards won by players who have won at least two Rising Star of the Month awards.

Players in bold are still active in Serie A. Players in italics are still active in professional football outside of Serie A.

As of March 2026 award

| Rank | Player | Wins |
|---|---|---|
| 1 | (Argentina) **Nico Paz** | 2 |
| 1 | (Turkey) **Kenan Yıldız** | 2 |

== Awards won by club ==
As of October 2026 award

| Rank | Club | Players | Wins |
|---|---|---|---|
| 1 | Como | 2 | 3 |
| 2 | Juventus | 1 | 2 |
| 2 | Napoli | 2 | 2 |
| 4 | Frosinone | 1 | 1 |
| 4 | Inter Milan | 1 | 1 |
| 4 | Monza | 1 | 1 |
| 4 | Roma | 1 | 1 |
| 4 | Udinese | 1 | 1 |

== Awards won by nationality ==
As of October 2026 award

| Rank | Nationality | Players | Wins |
|---|---|---|---|
| 1 | Italy | 3 | 3 |
| 2 | Argentina | 1 | 2 |
| 2 | France | 2 | 2 |
| 2 | Turkey | 1 | 2 |
| 5 | Croatia | 1 | 1 |
| 5 | Denmark | 1 | 1 |
| 5 | Portugal | 1 | 1 |

== See also ==
- Serie A Player of the Month
- Serie A Coach of the Month
- Serie A Goal of the Month
