= Kenan Yıldız =

Footballer (born 2005)

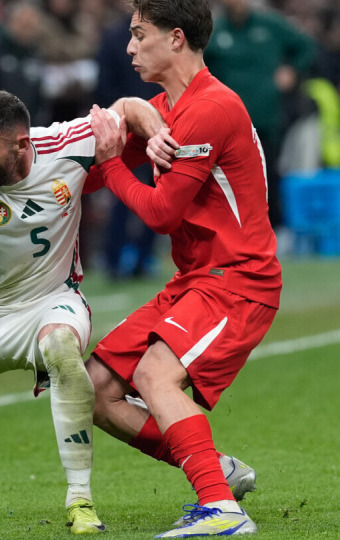
- Yıldız with Turkey in 2025

Personal information
- Full name: Kenan Yıldız
- Date of birth: 4 May 2005 (age 21)
- Place of birth: Regensburg, Germany
- Height: 1.87 m (6 ft 2 in)
- Positions: Attacking midfielder; winger

Team information
- Current team: Juventus
- Number: 10

Youth career
- 2010–2011: Sallern Regensburg
- 2011–2012: Jahn Regensburg
- 2012–2022: Bayern Munich
- 2022–2023: Juventus

Senior career*
Years	Team	Apps	(Gls)
2022–2023	Juventus Next Gen	14	(2)
2023–	Juventus	99	(19)

International career^{‡}
2021–2022	Turkey U17	10	(3)
2022–2026	Turkey U21	8	(2)
2023–	Turkey	31	(5)
- * Club domestic league appearances and goals as of 23:01, 23 August 2026 (UTC) ‡ National team caps and goals as of 25 June 2026

Kenan Yıldız (Turkish pronunciation: [ceˈnan ˈjɯɫdɯz]; born 4 May 2005) is a professional footballer who plays as an attacking midfielder or winger for Serie A club Juventus. Born in Germany, he plays for the Turkey national team.

Yıldız began his youth career with Bayern Munich and joined Juventus Next Gen in 2022. He was promoted to Juventus' first-team in November 2023 and won the Coppa Italia in 2024.

In May 2026, Yıldız was named Serie A's Best Under-23 Player for the 2025–26 season, receiving the league's "Rising Star" award after scoring ten goals and providing six assists for Juventus in 33 league appearances. He had also won the league's Rising Star of the Month award twice during the campaign.

== Early life ==
Kenan Yıldız was born in Regensburg, Germany, to his Turkish father Engin Yıldız and his German mother Beate Hackl.

== Club career ==
=== Youth career ===
He began playing football at the youth academies of Sallern Regensburg and Jahn Regensburg. He joined the youth academy of Bayern Munich in 2012 at the age of 7, and worked his way up their youth categories, often acting as captain and eventually becoming a mainstay of their U19s. In his final year with the Bayern U19s in the 2021–22 season, Yıldız contributed six goals and eight assists in 20 matches.

Yıldız's contract with Bayern Munich expired in July 2022, and the club confirmed that they were unable to re-sign him. Barcelona and Juventus competed for his signing as he became a free agent. On 12 July, Juventus confirmed the signing of Yıldız. In September, he was included among the best 60 players born in 2005 by English newspaper The Guardian.

After playing with the U19s, on 16 December, Yıldız was first called up to Juventus Next Gen—the reserve team of Juventus—for the match against Virtus Verona set to be played the following day. In that match, he was sent on as a substitute by coach Massimo Brambilla in the 61st minute to make his professional debut; the team lost 3–0. On 23 September 2023, he scored his first goal in professional football with a long-distance shot to open an away match against Ancona won 2–1.

=== Juventus ===
Yıldız made his Serie A debut for Juventus in a 3–0 away win over Udinese on 20 August 2023, coming on as a second-half substitute. Ten days later, he extended his contract with the club until 2027. He made his first start for the Juventus first team on 23 December, scoring the opening goal in a 2–1 win over Frosinone. This made him the club's youngest foreign goalscorer in Serie A at the age of 18 years and 233 days. On 16 August 2024, he extended his contract until 2029 and acquired the number 10 shirt.

On 17 September 2024, Yıldız scored the opener of a UEFA Champions League home match against PSV Eindhoven with a curling shot; it was the first-ever goal scored in the league phase of the competition, and it rendered him the youngest-ever goalscorer for the team in the Champions League, surpassing club legend Alessandro Del Piero. On 27 October, Yıldız came on as a substitute in the 60th minute with Juventus trailing 4–2 to Inter Milan in the Derby d'Italia and scored a brace to make it 4–4 and to win the MVP Award of the match. On 11 January 2025, he opened the Derby della Mole against Torino (ended 1–1) after dribbling a few opponents and netting from outside the area with the left foot; this goal would be voted the 2024–25 Goal of the Season at the end of the season. He finished the 2024–25 season with seven league goals. He took part in Juventus' 2025 FIFA Club World Cup campaign. On 18 June, he scored on their debut in a 5–0 victory against Al Ain, and four days later netted a brace in a 4–1 win against Wydad Casablanca.

Yıldız started the 2025–26 season winning the Serie A Player of the Month for August. On 16 September 2025, he scored a Del Piero Zone goal against Borussia Dortmund, which was reminiscent of Del Piero's goal also against Borussia Dortmund in his successful 1995–96 UEFA Champions League campaign, as Juventus came back to force a 4–4 draw. In doing so, he also became the fourth number 10 Juventus player (after Roberto Baggio, Del Piero, and Carlos Tevez) to score a goal against Borussia Dortmund in UEFA club competitions. Yıldız, who said he had never seen Del Piero's goal in 1995, told Sky Sport Italia that his shot was "instinctive". On 20 September, after Manuel Locatelli was subbed out at half-time break, Yıldız captained the Bianconeri in the second half of an away match drawn 1–1 to Hellas Verona. He is also the youngest player ever to doing so at the age of 20. On 7 February 2026, he extended his contract with the club until 2030.

== International career ==
Yıldız, also eligible to play for Germany, was a youth international for Turkey, having represented the Turkey U17s. On 27 September 2022, Yıldız made his Turkey U21 debut, playing 28 minutes against Georgia. In October 2023, Yıldız received his first call-up to the Turkey national team for two UEFA Euro 2024 qualifying matches against Croatia and Latvia. On 12 October, he made his full international debut as an 86th-minute substitute in the 1–0 win over Croatia. Yıldız scored his first international goal on 18 November 2023 in a friendly match with a 3–2 win over Germany, his mother's country and his country of birth, in Berlin. On 7 June 2024, he was selected in the 26-man squad for UEFA Euro 2024 in Germany.

== Playing style ==
Yıldız is a modern playmaker, known for his strong passing and shots from outside the box. He is also highly regarded in the media for his excellent technique and dribbling skills. His most natural role is as a playmaker, normally fielded as an attacking midfielder, although he has also been used in the mezzala role on occasion. Beyond his technical qualities, he is noted for this strong frame. Aside from the role of attacking midfielder, Yıldız can also play as a forward, either as a winger or second striker.

== Career statistics ==
=== Club ===
As of match played 23 August 2026

Appearances and goals by club, season and competition
Club	Season	League			Coppa Italia		Europe		Other		Total	
Club	Season	Division	Apps	Goals	Apps	Goals	Apps	Goals	Apps	Goals	Apps	Goals
Juventus Next Gen	2022–23	Serie C	7	0	—		—		1 (Note: Appearance in Coppa Italia Serie C)	0	8	0
Juventus Next Gen	2023–24	Serie C	7	2	—		—		—		7	2
Juventus Next Gen	Total		14	2	—		—		1	0	15	2
Juventus	2023–24	Serie A	27	2	5	2	—		—		32	4
Juventus	2024–25	Serie A	35	7	2	0	10 (Note: Appearances in UEFA Champions League)	1	5 (Note: One appearance and one goal in Supercoppa Italiana, four appearances and three goals in FIFA Club World Cup)	4	52	12
Juventus	2025–26	Serie A	36	10	1	0	10	1	—		47	11
Juventus	2026–27	Serie A	1	0	0	0	0	0	—		1	0
Juventus	Total		99	19	8	2	20	2	5	4	132	27
Career total			113	21	8	2	20	2	6	4	147	29

=== International ===
As of match played 25 June 2026

Appearances and goals by national team and year
National team	Year	Apps	Goals
Turkey	2023	3	1
Turkey	2024	14	1
Turkey	2025	9	3
Turkey	2026	5	0
Total		31	5

Scores and results list Turkey's goal tally first, score column indicates score after each Yıldız goal.

List of international goals scored by Kenan Yıldız
No.	Date	Venue	Cap	Opponent	Score	Result	Competition
1	18 November 2023	Olympiastadion, Berlin, Germany	2	Germany	2–1	3–2	Friendly
2	19 November 2024	Gradski stadion, Nikšić, Montenegro	17	Montenegro	1–1	1–3	2024–25 UEFA Nations League B
3	11 October 2025	Vasil Levski National Stadium, Sofia, Bulgaria	24	Bulgaria	3–1	6–1	2026 FIFA World Cup qualification
4	11 October 2025	Vasil Levski National Stadium, Sofia, Bulgaria	24	Bulgaria	4–1	6–1	2026 FIFA World Cup qualification
5	14 October 2025	Kocaeli Stadium, İzmit, Turkey	25	Georgia	1–0	4–1	2026 FIFA World Cup qualification

== Honours ==
Juventus

- Coppa Italia: 2023–24

Individual

- Golden Boy Web: 2024
- EA Sports FC Serie A Team of the Season: 2024–25, 2025–26
- Serie A Goal of the Season: 2024–25
- Serie A Player of the Month: August 2025
- Serie A Goal of the Month: January 2025
- Serie A Rising Star of the Month: November 2025, March 2026
- Serie A Rising Star of the Season: 2025–26
