= Serie A Awards =

Italian football awards

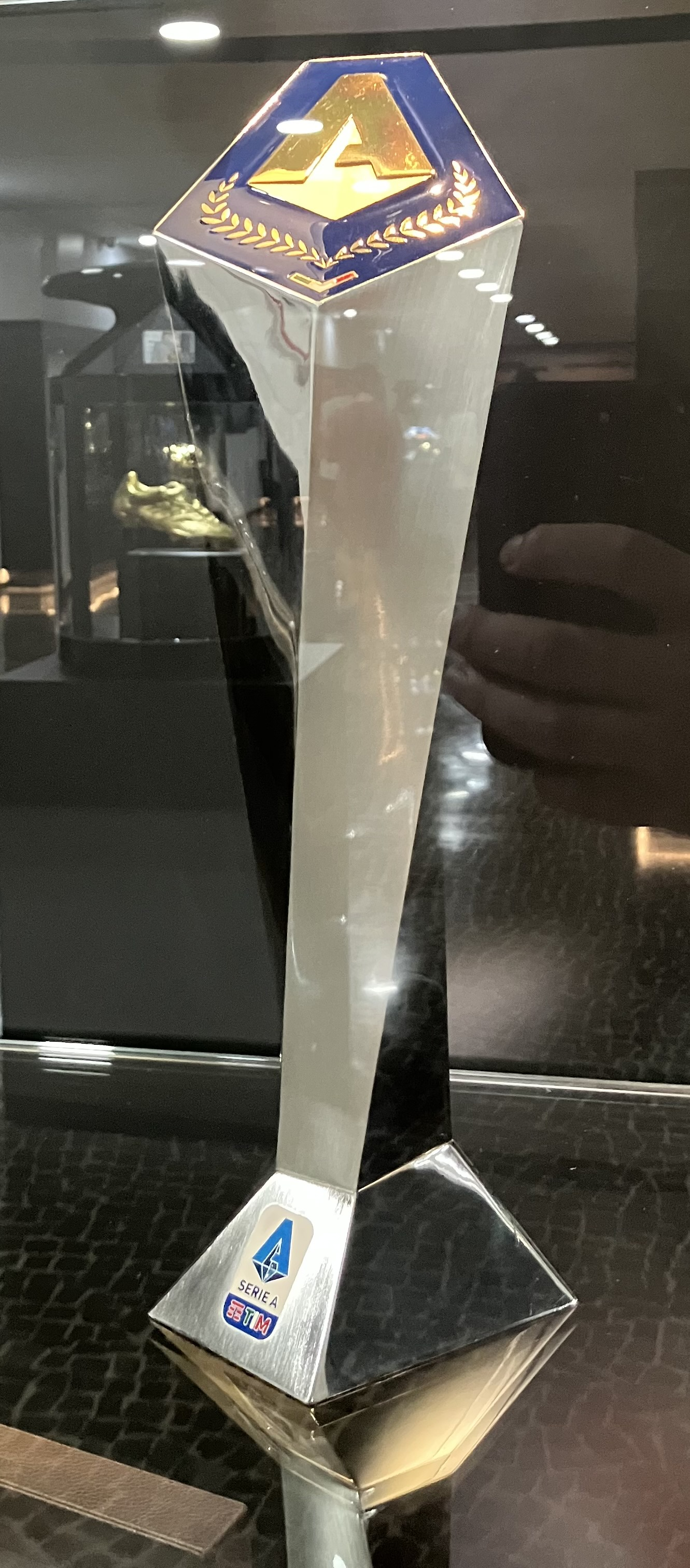
- Serie A Awards' trophy
- Sport: Association football
- Competition: Serie A; Coppa Italia; Supercoppa Italiana
- Awarded for: Best players of each Serie A season
- Local name: Premi Lega Serie A (Italian)
- Country: Italy
- Presented by: Lega Serie A

History
- First award: 2018–19
- Editions: 8
- Most wins: Cristiano Ronaldo (POR); Paulo Dybala (ARG); Romelu Lukaku (BEL); Rafael Leão (POR); Khvicha Kvaratskhelia (GEO); Lautaro Martínez (ARG); Scott McTominay (SCO); Federico Dimarco (ITA); 1 time each
- Most recent: Federico Dimarco (ITA); (2026)

The Serie A Awards (Italian: Premi Lega Serie A) are awarded by the Lega Serie A to the best footballers of each Serie A football season.

They were first awarded at the end of the 2018–19 Serie A season.

== History and regulations ==
The Serie A Awards are awarded under the categories of Best Goalkeeper, Best Defender, Best Midfielder, Best Striker, Best Young Player (Under-23), and Most Valuable Player of a particular Serie A, Coppa Italia, and Supercoppa Italiana season.

The ranking for each category is determined through a weighted calculation elaborated by Ernst & Young, based on statistical reporting by Stats Perform and Opta Sports and supported by data tracking provided by Netco Sports.

In the 2021–22 season, the Most Valuable Field award for the best football pitch and the Most Valuable Coach were introduced.

In the 2023–24 season, the Fair Play Moment of the Season was introduced.

In the 2024–25 season, the Frecciarossa Speed Award for the player who recorded the highest average top speed during the season was introduced.

== Main awards ==
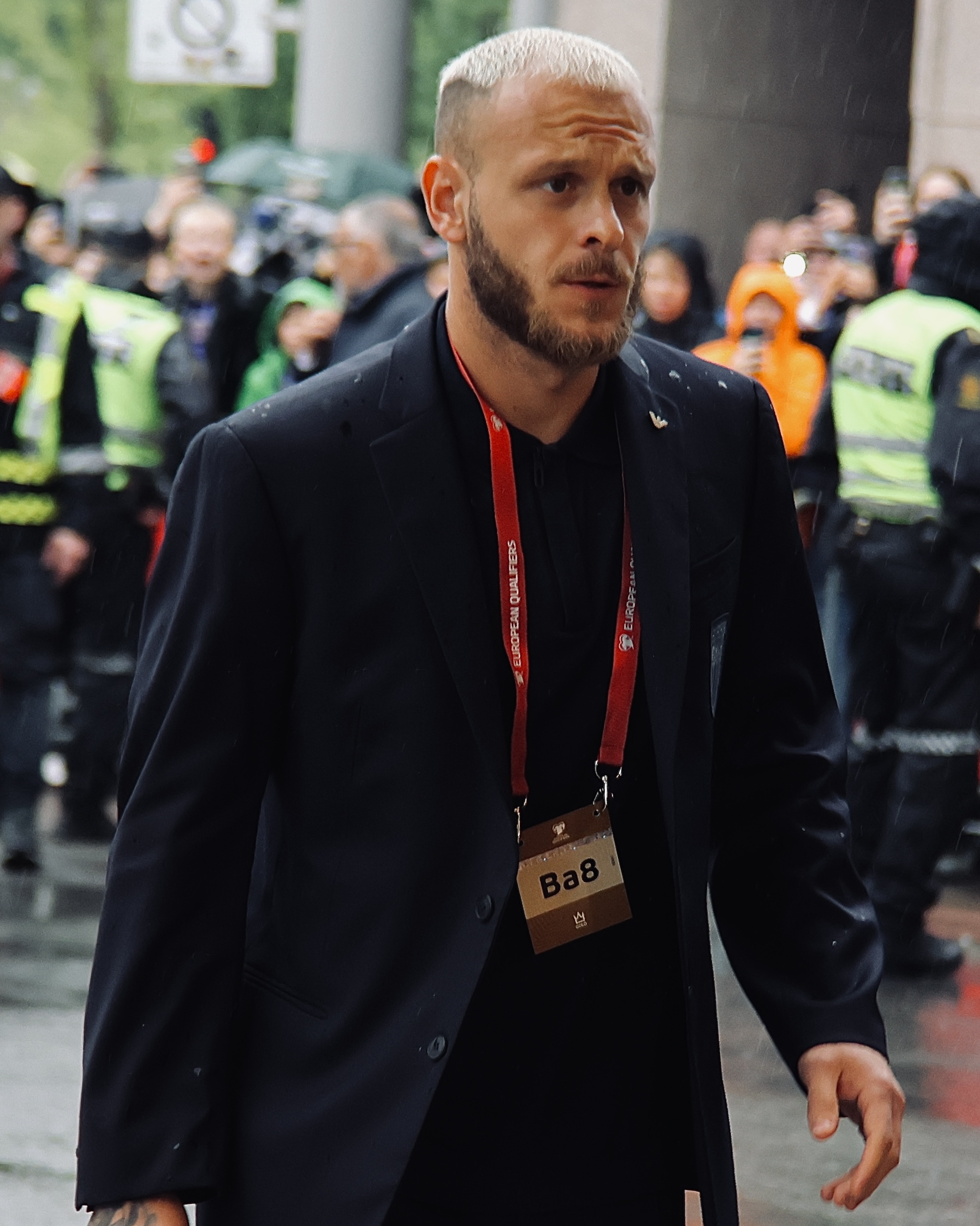
Inter Milan player Federico Dimarco is the current holder of the MVP award.

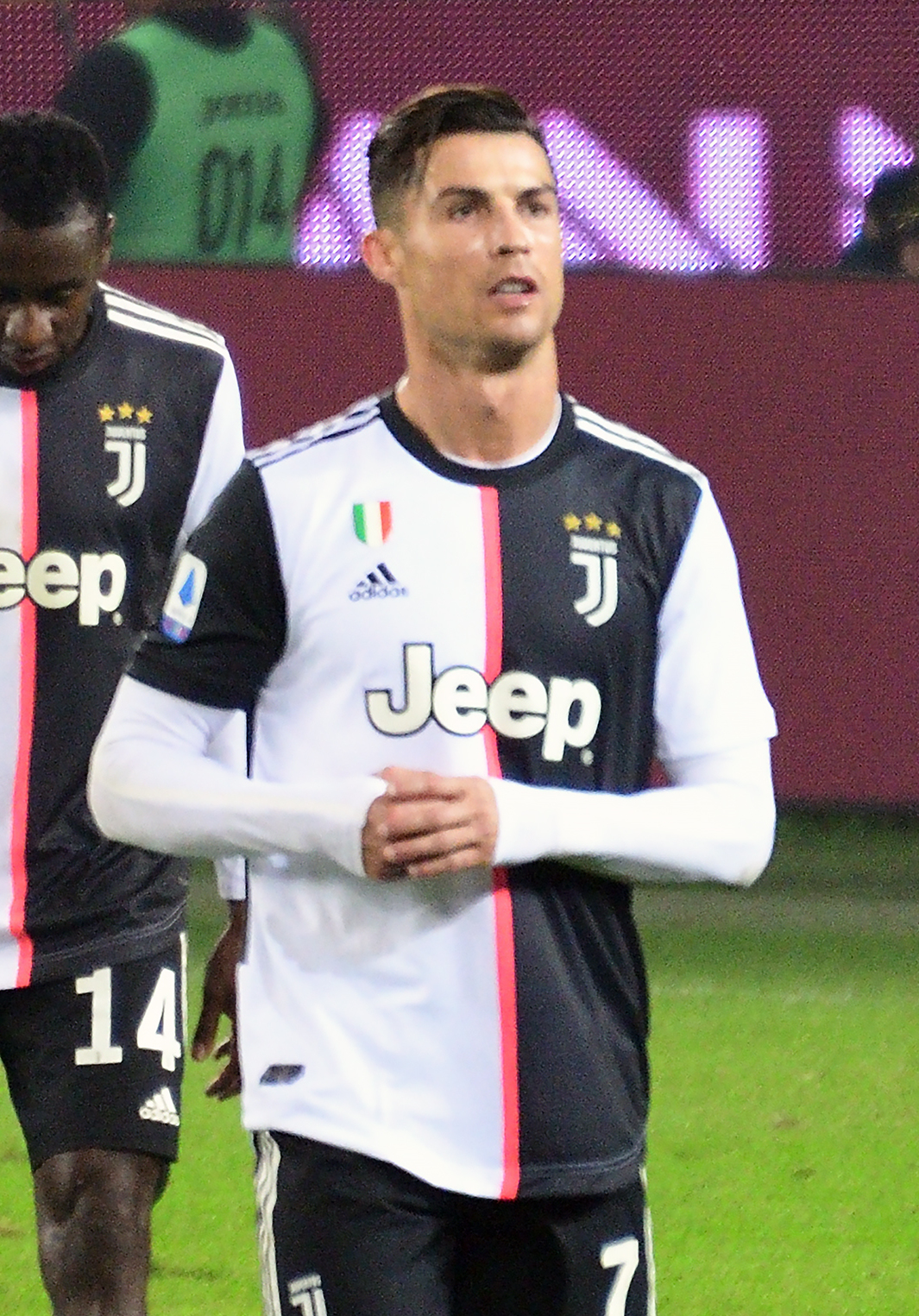
Cristiano Ronaldo won the inaugural MVP award for the 2018–19 season.

Season	Category						Ref.
Season	Most Valuable Player	Best Goalkeeper	Best Defender	Best Midfielder	Best Striker	Rising Star (Best Under-23)	Ref.
2018–19	(Portugal) Cristiano Ronaldo (Juventus)	(Slovenia) Samir Handanović (Inter Milan)	(Senegal) Kalidou Koulibaly (Napoli)	(Serbia) Sergej Milinković-Savić (Lazio)	(Italy) Fabio Quagliarella (Sampdoria)	(Italy) Nicolò Zaniolo (Roma)	
2019–20	(Argentina) Paulo Dybala (Juventus)	(Poland) Wojciech Szczęsny (Juventus)	(Netherlands) Stefan de Vrij (Inter Milan)	(Argentina) Alejandro Gómez (Atalanta)	(Italy) Ciro Immobile (Lazio)	(Sweden) Dejan Kulusevski (Parma)	
2020–21	(Belgium) Romelu Lukaku (Inter Milan)	(Italy) Gianluigi Donnarumma (AC Milan)	(Argentina) Cristian Romero (Atalanta)	(Italy) Nicolò Barella (Inter Milan)	(Portugal) Cristiano Ronaldo (Juventus)	(Serbia) Dušan Vlahović (Fiorentina)	
2021–22	(Portugal) Rafael Leão (AC Milan)	(France) Mike Maignan (AC Milan)	(Brazil) Bremer (Torino)	(Croatia) Marcelo Brozović (Inter Milan)	(Italy) Ciro Immobile (Lazio)	(Nigeria) Victor Osimhen (Napoli)	
2022–23	(Georgia (country)) Khvicha Kvaratskhelia (Napoli)	(Italy) Ivan Provedel (Lazio)	(South Korea) Kim Min-jae (Napoli)	(Italy) Nicolò Barella (Inter Milan)	(Nigeria) Victor Osimhen (Napoli)	(Italy) Nicolò Fagioli (Juventus)	
2023–24	(Argentina) Lautaro Martínez (Inter Milan)	(Italy) Michele Di Gregorio (Monza)	(Italy) Alessandro Bastoni (Inter Milan)	(Turkey) Hakan Çalhanoğlu (Inter Milan)	(Serbia) Dušan Vlahović (Juventus)	(Netherlands) Joshua Zirkzee (Bologna)	
2024–25	(Scotland) Scott McTominay (Napoli)	(Serbia) Mile Svilar (Roma)	(Italy) Alessandro Bastoni (Inter Milan)	(Netherlands) Tijjani Reijnders (AC Milan)	(Italy) Mateo Retegui (Atalanta)	(Argentina) Nico Paz (Como)	
2025–26	(Italy) Federico Dimarco (Inter Milan)	(Serbia) Mile Svilar (Roma)	(Italy) Marco Palestra (Cagliari)	(Argentina) Nico Paz (Como)	(Argentina) Lautaro Martínez (Inter Milan)	(Turkey) Kenan Yıldız (Juventus)	

== Other awards ==
Season	Category					Ref.
Season	Coach of the Season	Most Valuable Field	Goal of the Season	Fair Play Moment	Frecciarossa Speed Award	Ref.
2021–22	(Italy) Stefano Pioli (AC Milan)	Stadio Friuli (Udinese)	(France) Théo Hernandez (AC Milan)	Not awarded	Not awarded	
2022–23	(Italy) Luciano Spalletti (Napoli)	Stadio Atleti Azzurri d'Italia (Atalanta)	(Georgia (country)) Khvicha Kvaratskhelia (Napoli)	Not awarded	Not awarded	
2023–24	(Italy) Simone Inzaghi (Inter Milan)	Juventus Stadium (Juventus)	(Portugal) Dany Mota (Monza)	(Italy) Alessandro Florenzi (AC Milan)	Not awarded	
2024–25	(Italy) Antonio Conte (Napoli)	Stadio Brianteo (Monza)	(Turkey) Kenan Yıldız (Juventus)	(Italy) Claudio Ranieri (Roma)	(Cameroon) Jackson Tchatchoua (Hellas Verona)	
2025–26	(Romania) Cristian Chivu (Inter Milan)	Mapei Stadium (Sassuolo)	(Portugal) Francisco Conceição (Juventus)	(Serbia) Vanja Milinković-Savić (Napoli)	(Italy) Marco Palestra (Cagliari)	

== Multiple winners ==
Players in bold are still active in Serie A. Players in italics are still active in professional football outside of Serie A.

Rank	Player	Wins	Categories
1	(Italy) **Nicolò Barella**	2	Best Midfielder (2020–21, 2022–23)
1	(Italy) **Alessandro Bastoni**	2	Best Defender (2023–24, 2024–25)
1	(Italy) Ciro Immobile	2	Best Striker (2019–20, 2021–22)
1	(Argentina) **Lautaro Martínez**	2	Most Valuable Player (2023–24), Best Striker (2025–26)
1	(Nigeria) Victor Osimhen	2	Best Under-23 (2021–22), Best Striker (2022–23)
1	(Argentina) **Nico Paz**	2	Best Under-23 (2024–25), Best Midfielder (2025–26)
1	(Portugal) Cristiano Ronaldo	2	Most Valuable Player (2018–19), Best Striker (2020–21)
1	(Serbia) **Mile Svilar**	2	Best Goalkeeper (2024–25, 2025–26)
1	(Serbia) **Dušan Vlahović**	2	Best Under-23 (2020–21), Best Striker (2023–24)

== See also ==
- Gran Galà del Calcio
- Serie A Team of the Year
- Guerin d'Oro
- Panchina d'Oro
