= Raffaele Palladino =

Italian football manager (born 1984)

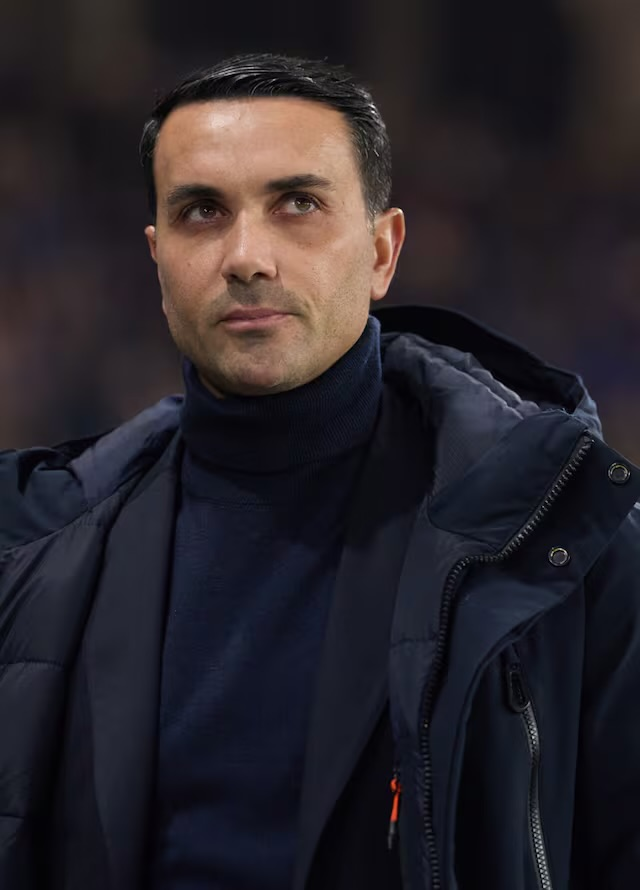
- Palladino in 2025

Personal information
- Date of birth: 17 April 1984 (age 42)
- Place of birth: Mugnano di Napoli, Italy
- Height: 1.82 m (6 ft 0 in)
- Position: Winger

Team information
- Current team: Bologna (head coach)

Youth career
- 1998–2000: Amici di Mugnano
- 2000–2002: Sporting Benevento
- 2002–2004: Juventus

Senior career*
Years	Team	Apps	(Gls)
2001–2002	Sporting Benevento	8	(1)
2004–2008	Juventus	51	(10)
2004–2005	→ Salernitana (loan)	39	(15)
2005–2006	→ Livorno (loan)	22	(2)
2008–2011	Genoa	58	(7)
2011–2015	Parma	71	(11)
2015–2017	Crotone	41	(6)
2017–2018	Genoa	16	(0)
2018	Spezia	6	(0)
2019	Monza	0	(0)
Total		312	(51)

International career
2003	Italy U19	4	(3)
2003–2004	Italy U20	2	(0)
2005–2007	Italy U21	15	(4)
2007–2009	Italy	3	(0)

Managerial career
- 2022–2024: Monza
- 2024–2025: Fiorentina
- 2025–2026: Atalanta
- 2026–: Bologna
- * Club domestic league appearances and goals

Raffaele Palladino (Italian pronunciation: [raffaˈɛːle pallaˈdiːno]; born 17 April 1984) is an Italian professional football coach and former player who is currently the head coach of Serie A club Bologna.

== Club career ==
Palladino signing for Juventus in 2007

Palladino started his senior career at Sporting Benevento, before joining the youth ranks of Juventus in 2002, where he achieved the Torneo di Viareggio in 2003 and 2004. In 2004–05, he was loaned out to Serie B club Salernitana, and Livorno for the 2005–06 season. On 27 August 2005, he scored his first goal for the latter on his Serie A debut, securing a 2–1 victory over Lecce.

He then returned to Juventus senior team in 2006–07, as the club were relegated to Serie B. He started and scored his first goal in a 1–1 away draw against AlbinoLeffe on 18 November 2006. On 19 March 2007, he netted his first career hat-trick in a 5–1 victory over Triestina. He eventually won the Serie B title that season with his club, securing an immediate promotion to the top-tier division.

On 3 July 2008, Palladino was signed by Genoa in co-ownership deal, priced €5 million (for 50% rights), joined along with defender Domenico Criscito on loan.

On 3 January 2011, Genoa's half share in Palladino was transferred to Parma in a move which saw Parma's half share in Alberto Paloschi go the other way and the exchange of the full registration of Francesco Modesto and Luca Antonelli. Genoa also paid a sum of €5.85M cash.

In June 2011, Juventus gave up the remaining 50% registration rights to Parma for free. In July 2013, he extended his contract to 30 June 2016.

On 10 November 2015, he was signed by Crotone. He renewed his contract in July 2016. On 31 January 2017, Palladino was re-signed by Genoa. On 15 January 2018, he signed for Serie B club Spezia.

On 31 March 2019, Monza announced the signing of Palladino.

== International career ==
Palladino made his debut at the age of 23, in a 3–1 home win against the Faroe Islands on 21 November 2007. He played as one of the three strikers along with Luca Toni and Vincenzo Iaquinta.

== Managerial career ==
=== Monza ===
Having coached Monza's youth sector since 2019, Palladino was appointed head coach of their Primavera (under-19) team on 9 July 2021. After having reached the semi-finals of the 2021–22 Campionato Primavera 2 (under-19) promotion play-offs, Monza renewed Palladino's contract for a further year in July 2022.

On 13 September 2022, Palladino was promoted head coach of Monza's first team following the dismissal of Giovanni Stroppa, with club CEO Adriano Galliani stating his appointment to be on a permanent basis. On his debut, Palladino guided Monza to their first ever top flight win, defeating Juventus 1–0. He was nominated Serie A Coach of the Month for April 2023. After having led Monza to avoid relegation six matchdays in advance, on 2 June 2023, he renewed with Monza for a further season. After finishing 12th in his second season saving the club from relegation again by a huge margin, he left Monza on 4 June 2024.

=== Fiorentina ===
On 4 June 2024, Palladino was appointed head coach of Serie A side Fiorentina on a two-year contract. But on 30 May 2025, despite finishing sixth in Serie A and qualifying for the next UEFA Conference League, he decided to leave the team by mutual consent.

=== Atalanta ===
On 11 November 2025, Palladino was announced as the new head coach of Serie A club Atalanta, signing a contract until 2027. He replaced Ivan Jurić and led the club to a seventh-place finish in Serie A, though was dismissed at the end of the season.

=== Bologna ===
On 16 September 2026, he was announced as the new head coach of Bologna, signing a contract until 2029

== Style of play ==
A right-footed player, he predominantly played as a winger, although he could also play as a forward, or as a second striker. He has also represented the Italy national side. He was known in particular for his excellent technical ability and dribbling skills, as well as his pace and agility on the ball, which allowed him to beat opposing players and create space for himself to get into positions from which he can strike on goal.

== Career statistics ==
=== International ===
Appearances and goals by national team and year
National team	Year	Apps	Goals
Italy	2007	1	0
Italy	2008	1	0
Italy	2009	1	0
Total		3	0

=== Managerial ===
As of match played 22 November 2026

Managerial record by team and tenure
Team	Nat	From	To	Record							
Team	Nat	From	To	G	W	D	L	GF	GA	GD	Win %
Monza	(Italy)	13 September 2022	4 June 2024	73	26	21	26	89	95	−6	35.62
Fiorentina	(Italy)	4 June 2024	30 May 2025	53	25	14	14	96	65	+31	47.17
Atalanta	(Italy)	11 November 2025	9 June 2026	39	18	9	12	61	46	+15	46.15
Bologna	(Italy)	16 September 2026	present	8	5	2	1	15	10	+5	62.50
Total				173	74	46	53	261	216	+45	42.77

== Honours ==
=== Player ===
Juventus Primavera

- Torneo di Viareggio: 2003, 2004

Juventus

- Serie B: 2006–07

Italy U19

- Under-19 European Championship: 2003

=== Manager ===
Individual

- Serie A Coach of the Month: April 2023, February 2026
