= 2022–23 Serie A =

121st season of top-tier Italian football

Serie A
- Season: 2022–23
- Dates: 13 August 2022 – 4 June 2023
- Champions: Napoli; 3rd title
- Relegated: Spezia; Cremonese; Sampdoria
- Champions League: Napoli; Lazio; Inter Milan; AC Milan
- Europa League: Atalanta; Roma
- Europa Conference League: Fiorentina
- Matches: 380
- Goals: 974 (2.56 per match)
- Top goalscorer: Victor Osimhen (26 goals)
- Biggest home win: Atalanta 8–2 Salernitana (15 January 2023)
- Biggest away win: Hellas Verona 0–6 Inter Milan (3 May 2023)
- Highest scoring: Atalanta 8–2 Salernitana (15 January 2023)
- Longest winning run: Napoli (11 matches)
- Longest unbeaten run: Napoli (15 matches)
- Longest winless run: Cremonese (23 matches)
- Longest losing run: Hellas Verona (10 matches)
- Highest attendance: 75,584; Inter Milan 1–0 AC Milan (5 February 2023)
- Lowest attendance: 6,500; Spezia 2–2 Sassuolo (28 August 2022)
- Attendance: 11,213,040 (29,508 per match)

The 2022–23 Serie A (known as the Serie A TIM for sponsorship reasons) was the 121st season of top-tier Italian football, the 91st in a round-robin tournament, and the 13th since its organization under an own league committee, the Lega Serie A. Napoli won the title with five matches remaining after a 1–1 draw against Udinese at the Dacia Arena on 4 May 2023.

Napoli's title was their third league title in club history and their first since Diego Maradona led them to victory in 1990 — bringing an end to their 33-year Scudetto drought. AC Milan, the defending champions, finished in fourth place. It was the first time since Roma in 2001 that a club other than AC Milan, Inter Milan or Juventus had won the Serie A title.

== Summary ==
This year would mark the return of playoff matches for the first time since 2005. If the season ends with two teams tied at the top of the league standings, those teams would play at a neutral site to determine the title winner. The match will have no extra time, and will instead go directly to a penalty shoot-out should the teams be tied after regulation. Head-to-head will still will used as a tiebreaker elsewhere on the board.

The Lega Serie A in February announced their intention to run a tournament in the United States during the 2022 FIFA World Cup, consisting of players who were not called up to play for the men's national team. The unusual scheduling of the World Cup in Qatar forced many leagues to interrupt their seasons for weeks, so the Serie A saw this as an opportunity to bolster its image abroad while keeping its players active. The idea received mixed feedback, and was ultimately cancelled by the league due to logistical and funding issues.

In January 2023, the Serie A deducted 15 points from Juventus after an investigation by the FIGC accused the club of manipulating their balancing sheets to show false gains of around 60m euros. Months later in April, Italy's highest court ordered the case to be re-examined, and the points were restored. The original ruling was upheld—though this time resulting in Juventus being docked 10 points—in May 2023.

On 28 July 2023, UEFA released a statement confirming Juventus has violated finance regulations. Consequently, Juventus faced penalties including exclusion from the 2023–24 UEFA Europa Conference League.

== Teams ==
Cremonese returned to the Serie A for the first time in 26 years—their longest absence from the top league in history. Lecce returned after two years. Monza were promoted for the first time in the club's history, making them the 67th team to play at the highest level of Italian football.

Cagliari were relegated to the Serie B after six years, while Venezia were relegated after only one. Genoa were relegated after 15 seasons, thus ending the club's longest consecutive run in the top league.

This was the first season since the 2003–04 campaign without any representation from the archipelagos of Italy (teams located on Sardinia or Sicily) in the Serie A.

=== Team changes ===
Promoted from 2021–22 Serie B	Relegated from 2021–22 Serie A
Lecce	Cagliari
Cremonese	Genoa
Monza	Venezia

=== Stadiums and locations ===
Locations of the 2022–23 Serie A teams

Team	Location	Stadium	Capacity
Atalanta	Bergamo	Stadio Atleti Azzurri d'Italia	21,000
Bologna	Bologna	Stadio Renato Dall'Ara	36,462
Cremonese	Cremona	Stadio Giovanni Zini	16,003
Empoli	Empoli	Stadio Carlo Castellani	16,284
Fiorentina	Florence	Stadio Artemio Franchi	43,147
Hellas Verona	Verona	Stadio Marcantonio Bentegodi	31,045
Inter Milan	Milan	San Siro	75,923
Juventus	Turin	Juventus Stadium	41,507
Lazio	Rome	Stadio Olimpico	70,634
Lecce	Lecce	Stadio Via del mare	31,533
AC Milan	Milan	San Siro	75,923
Monza	Monza	Stadio Brianteo	15,039
Napoli	Naples	Stadio Diego Armando Maradona	54,726
Roma	Rome	Stadio Olimpico	70,634
Salernitana	Salerno	Stadio Arechi	37,180
Sampdoria	Genoa	Stadio Luigi Ferraris	36,599
Sassuolo	Sassuolo	Mapei Stadium – Città del Tricolore	21,525
Spezia	La Spezia	Stadio Alberto Picco	11,512
Torino	Turin	Stadio Olimpico Grande Torino	27,958
Udinese	Udine	Stadio Friuli	25,144

=== Personnel and kits ===
Team	Manager	Captain	Kit manufacturer	Shirt sponsor(s)	
Team	Manager	Captain	Kit manufacturer	Main	Other
Atalanta	(Italy) Gian Piero Gasperini	(Italy) Rafael Tolói	Joma	Plus500	Front: Radici Group; Back: Gewiss; Sleeves: Automha
Bologna	(Italy) Thiago Motta	(Italy) Roberto Soriano	Macron	Cazoo	Back: Selenella; Sleeves: Lavoropiù
Cremonese	(Italy) Davide Ballardini	(Italy) Daniel Ciofani	Acerbis	Ilta Inox (H)/Arinox (A)	Front: Arvedi; Back: Gruppo Mauro Saviola; Sleeves: Arvedi Tubo Acciaio
Empoli	(Italy) Paolo Zanetti	(Italy) Filippo Bandinelli	Kappa	Computer Gross	Front: Sammontana (H)/Saint-Gobain (A); Back: Pediatrica; Sleeves: Contrader
Fiorentina	(Italy) Vincenzo Italiano	(Italy) Cristiano Biraghi	Kappa	Mediacom	Back: Holding Lamioni
Hellas Verona	(Italy) Marco Zaffaroni	(Portugal) Miguel Veloso	Macron	Sinergy Luce e Gas	Front: DR Automobiles; Back: VetroCar; Sleeves: Leasys Rent/Drivalia
Inter Milan	(Italy) Simone Inzaghi	(Slovenia) Samir Handanović	Nike	DigitalBits/Paramount+	Back: Lenovo; Sleeves: eBay
Juventus	(Italy) Massimiliano Allegri	(Italy) Leonardo Bonucci	Adidas	Jeep/Jeep Avenger	Back: Cygames; Sleeves: Bitget
Lazio	(Italy) Maurizio Sarri	(Italy) Ciro Immobile	Mizuno	Binance	Back: Clinica Paideia; Sleeves: AIRFire
Lecce	(Italy) Marco Baroni	(Denmark) Morten Hjulmand	M908	Links Management & Technology	Front: BetItaly Pay; Back: DEGHI; Sleeves: Banca Popolare Pugliese
AC Milan	(Italy) Stefano Pioli	(Italy) Davide Calabria	Puma	Emirates	Back: wefox; Sleeves: BitMEX
Monza	(Italy) Raffaele Palladino	(Italy) Matteo Pessina	Lotto	Motorola	Front: U-Power; Back: Pontenossa; Sleeves: Dell'Orto
Napoli	(Italy) Luciano Spalletti	(Italy) Giovanni Di Lorenzo	EA7	Lete	Front: MSC Cruises; Back: Upbit; Sleeves: Amazon
Roma	(Portugal) José Mourinho	(Italy) Lorenzo Pellegrini	New Balance	DigitalBits	Back: Auberge Resorts
Salernitana	(Portugal) Paulo Sousa	(Argentina) Federico Fazio	Zeus	Caffè Motta/Eté Supermercati	Front: Farmacia Continua/Soal Laboratories; Back: eCampus Università; Sleeves: Eté Supermercati/Caffè Motta
Sampdoria	(Serbia) Dejan Stanković	(Italy) Fabio Quagliarella	Macron	Banca Ifis	Front: La Mia Liguria/Salone Nautico di Genova; Back: IBSA Group; Sleeves: DR Automobiles
Sassuolo	(Italy) Alessio Dionisi	(Italy) Gian Marco Ferrari	Puma	Mapei	None
Spezia	(Italy) Leonardo Semplici	(Ghana) Emmanuel Gyasi	Acerbis	Distretti Ecologici	Front: La Mia Liguria; Back: Recrowd; Sleeves: Iozzelli Edilizia
Torino	(Croatia) Ivan Jurić	(Switzerland) Ricardo Rodriguez	Joma	Suzuki	Front: Fratelli Beretta; Back: EdiliziAcrobatica; Sleeves: N° 38 Wüber
Udinese	(Italy) Andrea Sottil	(Argentina) Roberto Pereyra	Macron	Dacia	Front: Prestipay; Back: Bluenergy; Sleeves: Prosciutto di San Daniele

=== Managerial changes ===
Team	Outgoing manager	Manner of departure	Date of vacancy	Position in table	Replaced by	Date of appointment
Cremonese	(Italy) Fabio Pecchia	Resigned	21 May 2022	Pre-season	(Italy) Massimiliano Alvini	1 July 2022
Hellas Verona	(Croatia) Igor Tudor	Mutual consent	28 May 2022	Pre-season	(Italy) Gabriele Cioffi	1 July 2022
Udinese	(Italy) Gabriele Cioffi	End of caretaker spell	30 May 2022	Pre-season	(Italy) Andrea Sottil	1 July 2022
Empoli	(Italy) Aurelio Andreazzoli	Contract expired	1 June 2022	Pre-season	(Italy) Paolo Zanetti	1 July 2022
Spezia	(Italy) Thiago Motta	Mutual consent	28 June 2022	Pre-season	(Italy) Luca Gotti	1 July 2022
Bologna	(Serbia) Siniša Mihajlović	Sacked	6 September 2022	16th	(Italy) Luca Vigiani (caretaker)	7 September 2022
Bologna	(Italy) Luca Vigiani	End of caretaker spell	12 September 2022	12th	(Italy) Thiago Motta	12 September 2022
Monza	(Italy) Giovanni Stroppa	Sacked	13 September 2022	20th	(Italy) Raffaele Palladino	13 September 2022
Sampdoria	(Italy) Marco Giampaolo	Sacked	2 October 2022	20th	(Serbia) Dejan Stanković	6 October 2022
Hellas Verona	(Italy) Gabriele Cioffi	Sacked	11 October 2022	18th	(Italy) Salvatore Bocchetti	13 October 2022
Hellas Verona	(Italy) Salvatore Bocchetti	Demoted to assistant coach	4 December 2022	20th	(Italy) Marco Zaffaroni	4 December 2022
Cremonese	(Italy) Massimiliano Alvini	Sacked	14 January 2023	20th	(Italy) Davide Ballardini	15 January 2023
Salernitana	(Italy) Davide Nicola	Sacked	15 February 2023	16th	(Portugal) Paulo Sousa	15 February 2023
Spezia	(Italy) Luca Gotti	Sacked	15 February 2023	17th	(Italy) Fabrizio Lorieri (caretaker)	15 February 2023
Spezia	(Italy) Fabrizio Lorieri	End of caretaker spell	23 February 2023	17th	(Italy) Leonardo Semplici	23 February 2023

== League table ==
Pos	Team	Pld	W	D	L	GF	GA	GD	Pts	Qualification or relegation
1	Napoli (C)	38	28	6	4	77	28	+49	90	Qualification for the Champions League group stage (Note: Should the first and second, or 17th and 18th-placed teams at the end of the season be tied on points, a play-off tiebreaker match was held at a neutral site to determine the title and final team relegated respectively.)
2	Lazio	38	22	8	8	60	30	+30	74	Qualification for the Champions League group stage
3	Inter Milan	38	23	3	12	71	42	+29	72	Qualification for the Champions League group stage
4	Milan	38	20	10	8	64	43	+21	70	Qualification for the Champions League group stage
5	Atalanta	38	19	7	12	66	48	+18	64	Qualification for the Europa League group stage (Note: Since the winners of the 2022–23 Coppa Italia, Inter Milan, qualified for the Champions League, the Europa League berth awarded to the Coppa Italia winners was passed to the sixth-placed team, and the Europa Conference League berth awarded to the sixth-placed team was passed to the seventh-placed team.)
6	Roma	38	18	9	11	50	38	+12	63	Qualification for the Europa League group stage
7	Juventus (Note: Juventus were excluded from UEFA competitions due to violation of UEFA's financial regulations.)	38	22	6	10	56	33	+23	62 (Note: Juventus were deducted 10 points as punishment for capital gain violations.)	
8	Fiorentina	38	15	11	12	53	43	+10	56	Qualification for the Εuropa Conference League play-off round
9	Bologna	38	14	12	12	53	49	+4	54	
10	Torino	38	14	11	13	42	41	+1	53	
11	Monza	38	14	10	14	48	52	−4	52	
12	Udinese	38	11	13	14	47	48	−1	46	
13	Sassuolo	38	12	9	17	47	61	−14	45	
14	Empoli	38	10	13	15	37	49	−12	43	
15	Salernitana	38	9	15	14	48	62	−14	42	
16	Lecce	38	8	12	18	33	46	−13	36	
17	Spezia (R)	38	6	13	19	31	62	−31	31 (Note: Head-to-head points: Spezia 4 Hellas Verona 1)	Qualification for the Relegation tie-breaker
18	Hellas Verona (O)	38	7	10	21	31	59	−28	31	Qualification for the Relegation tie-breaker
19	Cremonese (R)	38	5	12	21	36	69	−33	27	Relegation to Serie B
20	Sampdoria (R)	38	3	10	25	24	71	−47	19	Relegation to Serie B

Source: Serie A
Rules for classification: 1) Points; 2) Tiebreaker for Champions team and third relegated team; 3) Head-to-head points; 4) Head-to-head goal difference; 5) Goal difference; 6) Goals scored; 7) Draw. (Note: Head-to-head record is used only after all the matches between the teams in question have been played)
(C) Champions; (O) Play-off winners; (R) Relegated

== Results ==
Home \ Away	ATA	BOL	CRE	EMP	FIO	VER	INT	JUV	LAZ	LEC	MIL	MON	NAP	ROM	SAL	SAM	SAS	SPE	TOR	UDI
Atalanta	—	0–2	1–1	2–1	1–0	3–1	2–3	0–2	0–2	1–2	1–1	5–2	1–2	3–1	8–2	2–0	2–1	3–2	3–1	0–0
Bologna	1–2	—	1–1	0–1	2–1	1–1	1–0	1–1	0–0	2–0	1–1	0–1	2–2	0–0	1–1	1–1	3–0	2–0	2–1	3–0
Cremonese	1–3	1–5	—	1–0	0–2	1–1	1–2	0–1	0–4	0–2	0–0	2–3	1–4	2–1	2–0	0–1	0–0	2–0	1–2	0–0
Empoli	0–2	3–1	2–0	—	0–0	1–1	0–3	4–1	0–2	1–0	1–3	1–0	0–2	1–2	2–1	1–0	1–0	2–2	2–2	0–1
Fiorentina	1–1	1–2	3–2	1–1	—	2–0	3–4	1–1	0–4	1–0	2–1	1–1	0–0	2–1	2–1	5–0	2–1	1–1	0–1	2–0
Hellas Verona	0–1	2–1	2–0	1–1	0–3	—	0–6	0–1	1–1	2–0	1–2	1–1	2–5	1–3	1–0	2–1	2–1	1–2	0–1	1–2
Inter Milan	3–2	6–1	3–1	0–1	0–1	1–0	—	0–1	3–1	2–0	1–0	0–1	1–0	1–2	2–0	3–0	4–2	3–0	1–0	3–1
Juventus	3–3	3–0	2–0	4–0	1–0	1–0	2–0	—	3–0	2–1	0–1	0–2	0–1	1–1	2–2	4–2	3–0	2–0	4–2	1–0
Lazio	0–2	2–1	3–2	2–2	1–1	2–0	3–1	2–1	—	2–2	4–0	1–0	1–2	1–0	1–3	1–0	2–0	4–0	0–1	0–0
Lecce	2–1	2–3	1–1	1–1	1–1	0–1	1–2	0–1	2–1	—	2–2	1–1	1–2	1–1	1–2	1–1	0–1	0–0	0–2	1–0
AC Milan	2–0	2–0	1–1	0–0	2–1	3–1	3–2	2–0	2–0	2–0	—	4–1	1–2	2–2	1–1	5–1	2–5	2–1	1–0	4–2
Monza	0–2	1–2	1–1	2–1	3–2	2–0	2–2	1–0	0–2	0–1	0–1	—	2–0	1–1	3–0	2–2	1–1	2–0	1–2	1–2
Napoli	2–0	3–2	3–0	2–0	1–0	0–0	3–1	5–1	0–1	1–1	0–4	4–0	—	2–1	1–1	2–0	4–0	1–0	3–1	3–2
Roma	0–1	1–0	1–0	2–0	2–0	1–0	0–2	1–0	0–1	2–1	1–1	3–0	0–1	—	2–2	3–0	3–4	2–1	1–1	3–0
Salernitana	1–0	2–2	2–2	2–2	3–3	2–1	1–1	0–3	0–2	1–2	1–2	3–0	0–2	0–1	—	4–0	3–0	1–0	1–1	3–2
Sampdoria	0–2	1–2	2–3	1–1	0–2	3–1	0–0	0–0	1–1	0–2	1–2	0–3	0–2	0–1	0–0	—	2–2	1–1	0–2	0–1
Sassuolo	1–0	1–1	3–2	2–1	1–3	2–1	1–2	1–0	0–2	1–0	0–0	1–2	0–2	1–1	5–0	1–2	—	1–0	1–1	1–3
Spezia	2–2	2–2	2–2	1–0	1–2	0–0	2–1	0–2	0–3	0–0	2–0	0–2	0–3	0–2	1–1	2–1	2–2	—	0–4	1–1
Torino	1–2	1–0	2–2	1–1	1–1	1–1	0–1	0–1	0–0	1–0	2–1	1–1	0–4	0–1	1–1	2–0	0–1	0–1	—	1–0
Udinese	2–2	1–2	3–0	1–1	1–0	1–1	3–1	0–1	0–1	1–1	3–1	2–2	1–1	4–0	0–0	2–0	2–2	2–2	1–2	—

Source: Serie A
Legend: Blue = home team win; Yellow = draw; Red = away team win.
For upcoming matches, an "a" indicates there is an article about the rivalry between the two participants.

== Relegation tie-breaker ==
As Spezia and Hellas Verona finished level on points in the final relegation spot, a one-match relegation tie-breaker was held at a neutral venue to determine the final team which would be relegated to Serie B.

11 June 2023
20:45 CEST

Spezia	1–3	Hellas Verona
Ampadu 15'	Report	Faraoni 5'; Ngonge 26', 38'

Mapei Stadium – Città del Tricolore, Reggio Emilia
Attendance: 15,000
Referee: Daniele Orsato

Hellas Verona won 3–1 and remained in Serie A, while Spezia were relegated to Serie B.

== Season statistics ==
=== Top goalscorers ===
Rank	Player	Club	Goals
1	(Nigeria) Victor Osimhen	Napoli	26
2	(Argentina) Lautaro Martínez	Inter Milan	21
3	(Senegal) Boulaye Dia	Salernitana	16
4	(Portugal) Rafael Leão	AC Milan	15
5	(France) Olivier Giroud	AC Milan	13
5	(Nigeria) Ademola Lookman	Atalanta	13
5	(Angola) M'Bala Nzola	Spezia	13
8	(Italy) Domenico Berardi	Sassuolo	12
8	(Argentina) Paulo Dybala	Roma	12
8	(Italy) Ciro Immobile	Lazio	12
8	(Georgia (country)) Khvicha Kvaratskhelia	Napoli	12
8	(Paraguay) Antonio Sanabria	Torino	12

=== Hat-tricks ===
Player	Club	Against	Result	Date
(Netherlands) Teun Koopmeiners	Atalanta	Torino	3–1 (H)	1 September 2022
(Nigeria) Victor Osimhen	Napoli	Sassuolo	4–0 (H)	29 October 2022
(Senegal) Boulaye Dia	Salernitana	Fiorentina	3–3 (H)	3 May 2023
(France) Olivier Giroud	AC Milan	Sampdoria	5–1 (H)	20 May 2023
(Netherlands) Teun Koopmeiners	Atalanta	Monza	5–2 (H)	4 June 2023

Notes

(H) – Home team
(A) – Away team

=== Clean sheets ===
Rank	Player	Club	Clean sheets
1	(Italy) Ivan Provedel	Lazio	21
2	(Italy) Alex Meret	Napoli	16
3	(Poland) Wojciech Szczęsny	Juventus	15
4	(Portugal) Rui Patrício	Roma	13
5	(Serbia) Vanja Milinković-Savić	Torino	11
6	(Italy) Michele Di Gregorio	Monza	10
6	(Italy) Marco Silvestri	Udinese	10
8	(Italy) Andrea Consigli	Sassuolo	9
9	(France) Mike Maignan	AC Milan	8
9	(Argentina) Juan Musso	Atalanta	8
9	(Cameroon) André Onana	Inter Milan	8

=== Discipline ===
==== Player ====
- Most yellow cards: 13
  - (Algeria) Mehdi Léris (Sampdoria)
- Most red cards: 3
  - (Brazil) Ruan (Sassuolo)

==== Club ====
- Most yellow cards: 109
  - Hellas Verona
- Most red cards: 7
  - Empoli
- Fewest yellow cards: 47
  - Napoli
- Fewest red cards: 0
  - Torino

== Awards ==
=== Monthly awards ===
Month	Player of the Month		Coach of the Month		Goal of the Month	
Month	Player	Club	Coach	Club	Player	Club
August	(Georgia (country)) Khvicha Kvaratskhelia	Napoli	(Portugal) José Mourinho	Roma	(Italy) Lorenzo Colombo	Lecce
September	(South Korea) Kim Min-jae	Napoli	(Italy) Andrea Sottil	Udinese	(Portugal) Rafael Leão	AC Milan
October	(Portugal) Rafael Leão	AC Milan	(Italy) Luciano Spalletti	Napoli	(Spain) Brahim Díaz	AC Milan
November	(Italy) Moise Kean	Juventus	(Italy) Massimiliano Allegri	Juventus	(Scotland) Lewis Ferguson	Bologna
January	(Nigeria) Victor Osimhen	Napoli	(Italy) Luciano Spalletti	Napoli	(Nigeria) Victor Osimhen	Napoli
February	(Georgia (country)) Khvicha Kvaratskhelia	Napoli	(Italy) Thiago Motta	Bologna	(Italy) Cristiano Biraghi	Fiorentina
March	(Georgia (country)) Khvicha Kvaratskhelia	Napoli	(Italy) Maurizio Sarri	Lazio	(Georgia (country)) Khvicha Kvaratskhelia	Napoli
April	(Portugal) Rafael Leão	AC Milan	(Italy) Raffaele Palladino	Monza	(Belgium) Alexis Saelemaekers	AC Milan
May	(Senegal) Boulaye Dia	Salernitana	(Italy) Vincenzo Italiano	Fiorentina	(France) Théo Hernandez	AC Milan

=== Seasonal awards ===
Award	Winner	Club	Ref.
Most Valuable Player	(Georgia (country)) Khvicha Kvaratskhelia	Napoli	
Best Under-23	(Italy) Nicolò Fagioli	Juventus	
Best Goalkeeper	(Italy) Ivan Provedel	Lazio	
Best Defender	(South Korea) Kim Min-jae	Napoli	
Best Midfielder	(Italy) Nicolò Barella	Inter Milan	
Best Striker	(Nigeria) Victor Osimhen	Napoli	
Coach of the Season	(Italy) Luciano Spalletti	Napoli	
Goal of the Season	(Georgia (country)) Khvicha Kvaratskhelia	Napoli	

Team of the Season
Goalkeeper	(Poland) Wojciech Szczęsny (Juventus)			
Defence	(Italy) Giovanni Di Lorenzo (Napoli)	(Brazil) Bremer (Juventus)	(South Korea) Kim Min-jae (Napoli)	(France) Théo Hernandez (AC Milan)
Midfield	(Italy) Nicolò Barella (Inter Milan)	(France) Adrien Rabiot (Juventus)		(Italy) Sandro Tonali (AC Milan)
Attack	(Georgia (country)) Khvicha Kvaratskhelia (Napoli)	(Nigeria) Victor Osimhen (Napoli)		(Portugal) Rafael Leão (AC Milan)
Bench	(England) Chris Smalling (Roma) (Brazil) Gabriel Strefezza (Lecce) (Argentina) Paulo Dybala (Roma) (Argentina) Lautaro Martínez (Inter Milan)			

AIC Serie A Team of the Year
Goalkeeper	(France) Mike Maignan (AC Milan)			
Defence	(Italy) Giovanni Di Lorenzo (Napoli)	(South Korea) Kim Min-jae (Napoli)	(Italy) Alessandro Bastoni (Inter Milan)	(France) Théo Hernandez (AC Milan)
Midfield	(Italy) Nicolò Barella (Inter Milan)	(Turkey) Hakan Çalhanoğlu (Inter Milan)		(Slovakia) Stanislav Lobotka (Napoli)
Attack	(Georgia (country)) Khvicha Kvaratskhelia (Napoli)	(Nigeria) Victor Osimhen (Napoli)		(Portugal) Rafael Leão (AC Milan)

== Attendances ==
#	Football club	Home games	Average attendance
1	Internazionale	19	72,630
2	AC Milan	19	71,828
3	AS Roma	19	62,043
4	SS Lazio	19	45,641
5	SSC Napoli	19	45,617
6	Juventus	19	37,672
7	Fiorentina	19	32,200
8	US Lecce	19	24,683
9	Bologna FC	19	22,314
10	Udinese	19	21,637
11	Sampdoria	19	20,133
12	Salernitana	19	20,068
13	Torino FC	19	19,508
14	Hellas Verona	19	19,307
15	Atalanta BC	19	18,241
16	US Sassuolo	19	13,551
17	AC Monza	19	12,413
18	Cremonese	19	11,986
19	Empoli FC	19	10,293
20	Spezia Calcio	19	9,256
