= Juventus FC Youth Sector =

Youth teams of Juventus FC

Juventus Youth Sector
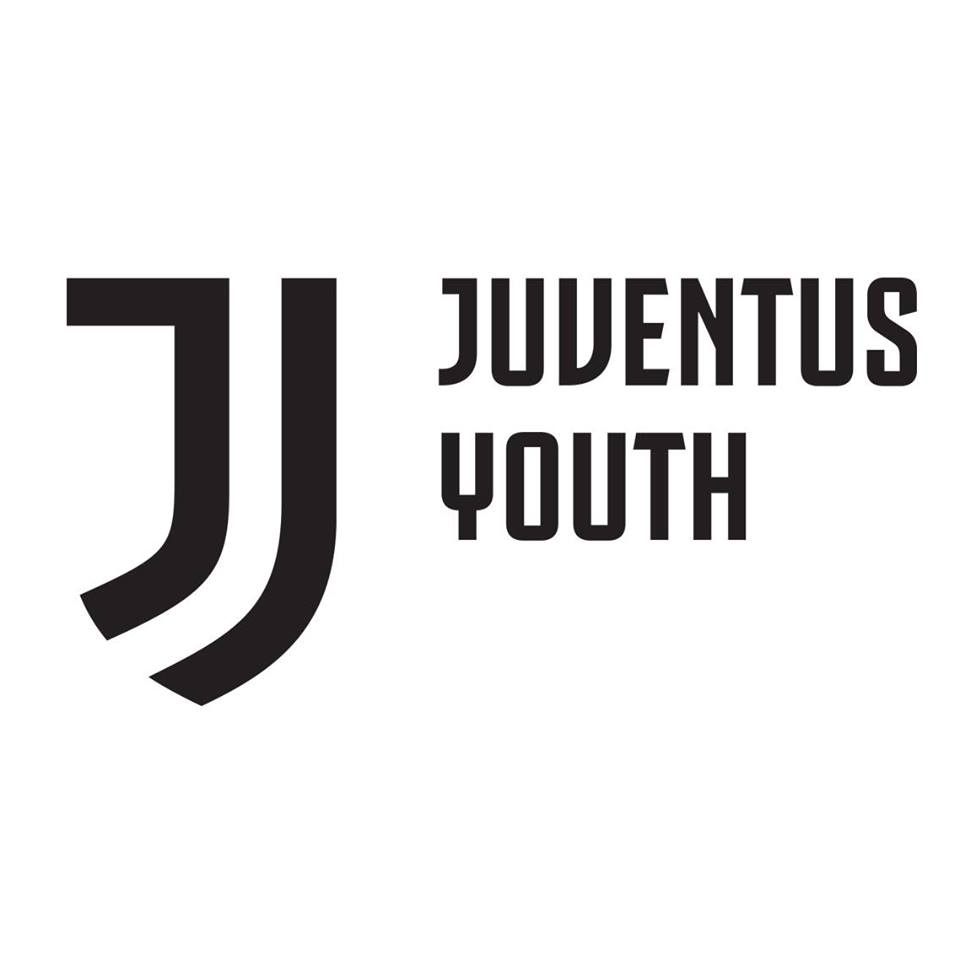
- Full name: Juventus Football Club Youth Sector
- Nicknames: I Bianconeri (The White and Blacks) (Note: The literal translation of bianconeri is "whiteblacks". However, "black and whites" is also commonly used.); Le Zebre (The Zebras)
- Ground: Juventus Training Center; Vinovo, Italy
- Capacity: 400
- Chairman: Gianluca Ferrero
- Head coach: Simone Padoin
- League: Campionato Primavera 1
- 2022–23: Campionato Primavera 1, play-off round (5th in regular season)
| Home colours | Away colours | Third colours |

Juventus Football Club Youth Sector (Italian: Settore giovanile della Juventus Football Club) is the youth system of Italian football club Juventus. The Youth Sector is made up of various squads divided by age groups. Most of the squads train at the first team's former main training ground, Juventus Training Center, located in Vinovo.

The Youth Sector is divided into 11 squads: "Primavera" (under-20), under-18, "Allievi" (under-17), under-16, under-15, "Esordienti" (under-13), under-12, "Pulcini" (under-11), under-10, under-9, under-8 and under-7. In 2018, Juventus formed their reserve team (under-23), competing in the senior league system.

== History ==
Despite an extensive international scouting network, the club has historically placed importance on nurturing local talent and continues to do so. One proof of this is the fact of the Italy national team, coached by Enzo Bearzot during the mid-1970s and mid-1980s, was mainly composed of young Juventus players – nicknamed the Blocco-Juve ("Juve-Block") – who formed the backbone of the national team. Examples include Roberto Bettega, Giuseppe Furino and Paolo Rossi, all former members at the Juventus youth program (then known as Nucleo Addestramento Giovani Calciatori or N.A.G.C.).

Graduates of the youth sector ply their trade in other Serie A clubs and top-flight leagues around Europe. More recently the 2012–13 Scudetto-winning squad featured Paolo De Ceglie, second vice-captain Claudio Marchisio, Sebastian Giovinco and Luca Marrone; the latter three were born and raised in the Turin area.

In 2018, Juventus formed a reserve team, Juventus Under-23, and was officially admitted to the Serie C. The club cannot play in the same division—or higher—as their senior team, nor can they compete in the Coppa Italia. They won their first trophy in their second year as a club, after beating Ternana in the 2020 Coppa Italia Serie C final. In 2022, Juventus U23 was rebranded Juventus Next Gen.

Starting from 2025, Juventus began competing in the Premier League International Cup, an international under-21 tournament, featuring a mix of Juventus Primavera and Next Gen footballers.

From 2021, all clubs with teams competing in the Campionato Primavera 1 (under-19) also have to participate in the under-18 championship. However, since Juventus already have a reserve team they have the choice on whether or not to participate in the under-18 championship. The exemption notwithstanding, the Juventus U18 team took shape ahead of the 2026–27 season. In said season, Juventus also registered two second teams playing in the Campionato Under-15 and Under-16 Serie C.

== Structure ==
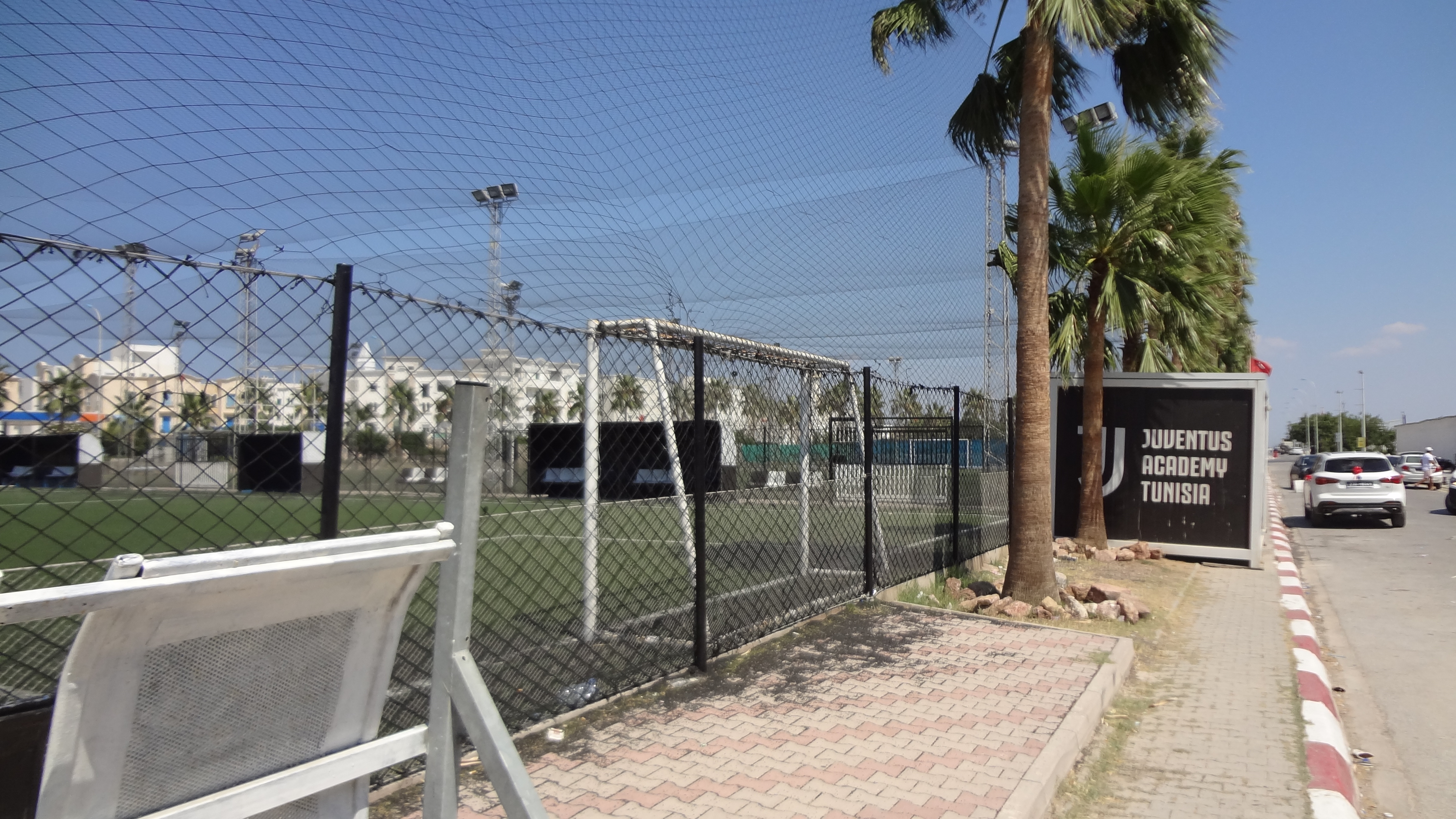
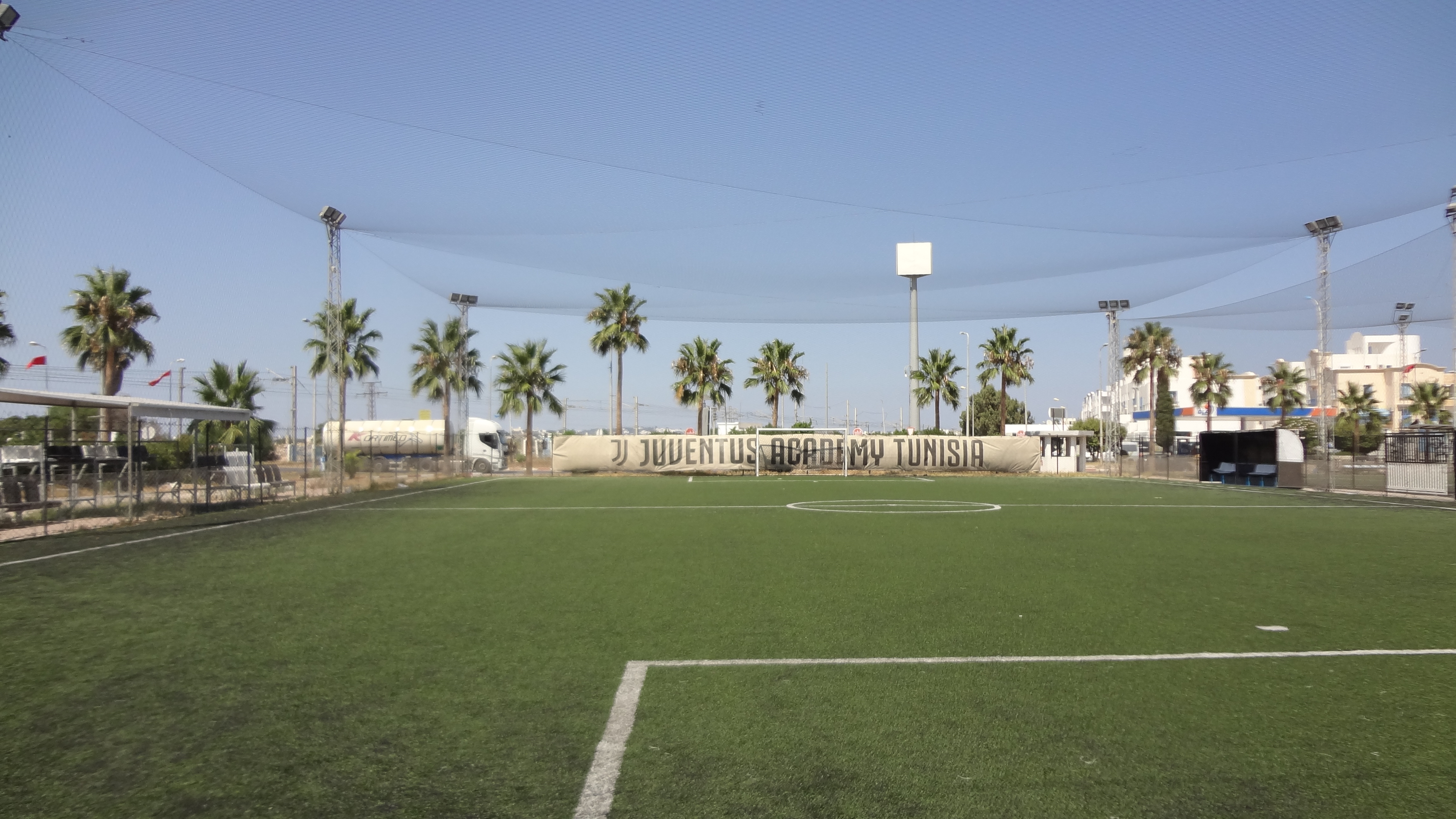
An external and internal partial view of the Juventus Academy grounds in La Goulette, Tunisia (2022)

The club maintains several soccer schools, some satellite clubs and camps in Italy, the United States, Mexico and England and football initiatives such as the Juventus University, the first of its kind in the world (run jointly with the University of Turin) and the Juventus National Academy, launched to create a network of Juventus football schools (or academies) throughout Italy addressed to boys aged between 8 and 12 years old.

=== Juventus College ===
The Juventus College (J-College) was opened in September 2012. It is a boarding school founded mainly to cater to boys who do not reside within the city. It was initially founded as a collaboration with the Istituto Edoardo Agnelli, a high school founded by the Agnelli family's charitable foundation in collaboration with the Salesians, who have a long tradition and history of education in Turin. Since 2014, J-College has been overseen by the International School of Europe. Previously the boys, especially those from outside of the Turin area, would have to drop out of school and move there. J-College was modelled after Premier League clubs' youth academies, which cater to the educational needs of its youth players under 18 years old, in addition to providing lodging for non-local players.

J-College is an accredited scuola secondaria di secondo grado ("upper secondary school", ages 14 to 19) with two streams: a liceo scientifico offering the "applied sciences" option (opzione scienze applicate) and the liceo sportivo. Since 2014, it has been designated a liceo sportivo (sports school), the first of its kind in Italy, by the Ministry of Education, Universities and Research (MIUR). It also provides practical vocational training for the youth sector players past the mandatory schooling age of 16, in particular older boys in the Primavera age group.

== Primavera (under-20s) ==
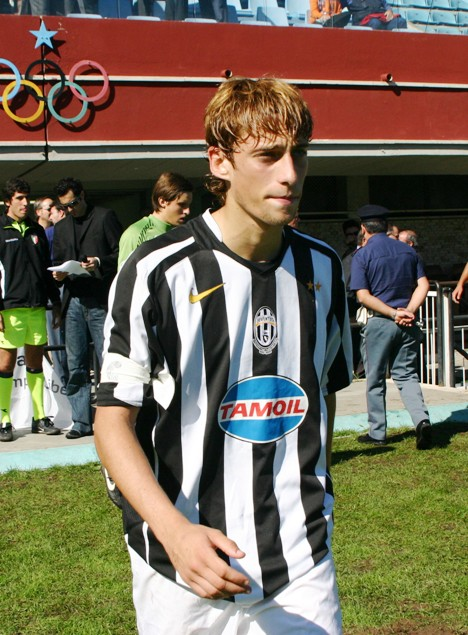
A 19-year-old Claudio Marchisio with the Juventus Youth Sector in 2005

From the 2012–13 season, the Primavera team is composed of players who are at least 15 years old and who are under 19 in the calendar year in which the season ends. Until the 2011–12 season, the age limit was 20. Starting from 2023–24, the limit was lifted to 20 again. According to Italian football league system, it is the main youth category. Unlike many teams in the league, Juventus tend to field under-age players to send them to play with Juventus Next Gen later.

The team competes in the Campionato Primavera 1. They have won four league titles, three Coppa Italia Primavera titles, and three Supercoppa Primavera titles. Juventus also won the Torneo di Viareggio a record nine times.

In 2007 the Juventus under-19 team finished runners-up in the inaugural edition of the Champions Youth Cup in Malaysia, intended to be a Club World Championship powered by G-14; the hed the best defence of the tournament with only two goals conceded in six matches. In the 2021–22 UEFA Youth League, Juventus were eliminated after penalty shoot-outs against Benfica at the semi-finals, their best-ever placement in the competition.

=== Current squad ===
As of 25 August 2026

Note: Flags indicate national team as defined under FIFA eligibility rules; some limited exceptions apply. Players may hold more than one non-FIFA nationality.

| No. | Pos. | Nation | Player |
|---|---|---|---|
| 1 | GK | ITA | Sebastiano Nava |
| 2 | DF | ITA | Davide Rigo |
| 3 | DF | ITA | Niccolò Rizzo |
| 4 | DF | BEL | Wout Gielen |
| 5 | DF | ROU | Fabio Bădărău |
| 6 | MF | ITA | Nicolò Milia |
| 7 | FW | ITA | Luca Bracco |
| 8 | MF | FRA | Idris Amara Sylla |
| 9 | FW | ESP | Iván López |
| 10 | MF | ITA | Thomas Corigliano |
| 11 | FW | CZE | Adam Sosna |
| 13 | DF | ITA | Francesco Verde |
| 14 | FW | ALB | Arman Durmiši |
| 15 | MF | ITA | Edoardo Vallana |
| 16 | MF | ITA | Benit Borasio |
| 17 | MF | ITA | Filippo Bellino |
| 18 | FW | NGR | Daniel Okolo |
| 19 | MF | ITA | Marco Tiozzo |
| 21 | MF | ITA | Paolo Ceppi |
| 22 | MF | ROU | Gabriel Repciuc |

| No. | Pos. | Nation | Player |
|---|---|---|---|
| 23 | MF | BEL | Enzo Keutgen |
| 25 | MF | BEL | Grady Makiobo |
| 26 | DF | BEL | Josue Grelaud |
| 27 | MF | ROU | Stefano Precupano |
| 28 | FW | SEN | Demba Samb |
| 31 | MF | POL | Patryk Mazur |
| 33 | DF | BEL | Maxime De Brul |
| 34 | DF | FRA | Léo Bamballi |
| 35 | FW | ITA | Destiny Elimoghale |
| 37 | GK | ALB | Raffaele Huli |
| 43 | DF | FRA | Louis Reynaud |
| 44 | DF | URU | Alfonso Montero |
| 59 | DF | BEL | Antoine Beydts |
| — | GK | HUN | Mátyás Jakab |
| — | MF | ITA | Denaly Osakue |
| — | MF | ITA | Alessandro Brancato |
| — | MF | ITA | Tiago Malfatti |
| — | FW | ITA | Antonio Stefano Merola |
| — | FW | ITA | Mateo Santa Maria |

=== Coaching staff ===
| Position | Staff |
|---|---|
| Head coach | (Italy) Simone Padoin |
| Goalkeeping coach | (Italy) Pietro Pipolo |

Last updated: 7 August 2025
Source: Juventus.com

=== Honours ===
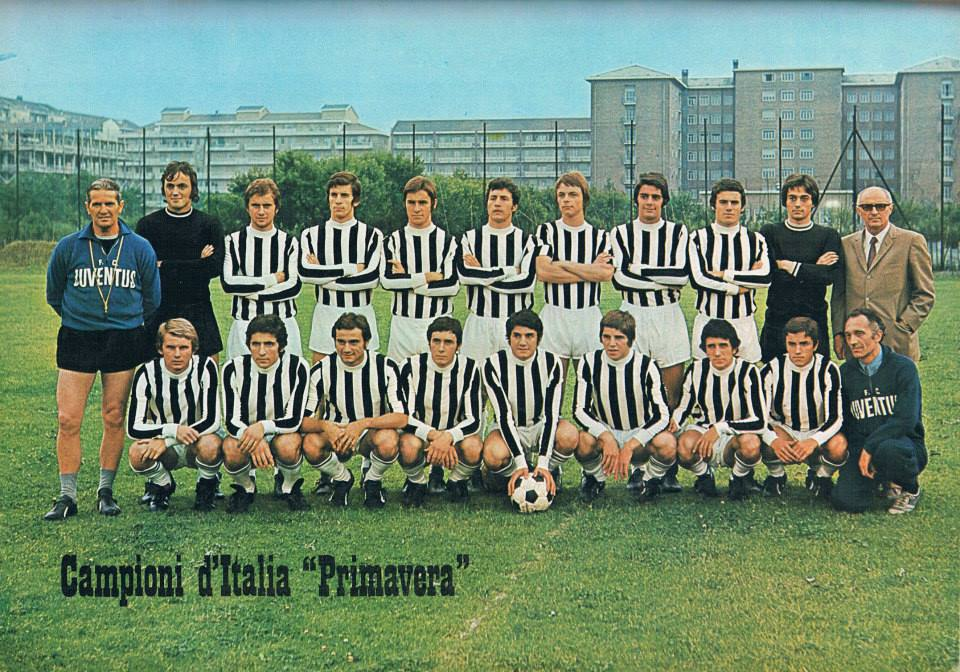
The 1971–72 Primavera squad that won its second Scudetto

National

- Campionato Nazionale Primavera (4): 1962–63, 1971–72, 1993–94, 2005–06
- Coppa Italia Primavera (3): 1994–95, 2003–04, 2006–07, 2012–13
- Supercoppa Primavera (3; record): 2006, 2007, 2013

International

- Torneo di Viareggio (9; record): 1961, 1994, 2003, 2004, 2005, 2009, 2010, 2012, 2016

== Notable youth team players ==
As of 4 October 2026

The following is a list of players who have played in the Juventus youth team and represented a country at full international level. Players in bold are currently playing at Juventus, or for another club on loan from Juventus.

- (Albania) Luis Hasa
- (Algeria) Mehdi Léris
- (Australia) Max Vieri
- (Argentina) Matías Soulé
- (Belgium) Koni De Winter
- (Benin) Angel Chibozo
- (Croatia) Simon Sluga
- (Cyprus) Grigoris Kastanos
- (Ecuador) José Cevallos
- (Ghana) Raman Chibsah
- (Greece) Anastasios Donis
- (Haiti) Frantz Bertin
- (Indonesia) Emil Audero
- (Iceland) Hörður Björgvin Magnússon
- (Italy) Giancarlo Bercellino
- (Italy) Roberto Bettega
- (Italy) Carlo Bigatto
- (Italy) Giampiero Boniperti
- (Italy) Umberto Colombo
- (Italy) Gianpiero Combi
- (Italy) Domenico Criscito (Note: The player had already made his professional debut before joining Juventus, and spent some time in the Primavera team.)
- (Italy) Alessandro Del Piero
- (Italy) Nicolò Fagioli
- (Italy) Giuseppe Furino
- (Italy) Sebastian Giovinco
- (Italy) Ciro Immobile
- (Italy) Michael Kayode
- (Italy) Moise Kean
- (Italy) Claudio Marchisio
- (Italy) Domenico Marocchino
- (Italy) Carlo Mattrel
- (Italy) **Fabio Miretti**
- (Italy) Antonio Nocerino
- (Italy) Raffaele Palladino
- (Italy) Carlo Parola
- (Italy) Pietro Rava
- (Italy) Enzo Robotti
- (Italy) Tommaso Rocchi
- (Italy) Paolo Rossi
- (Italy) **Daniele Rugani**
- (Italy) Luigi Sartor
- (Italy) Leonardo Spinazzola
- (Italy) Gino Stacchini
- (Italy) Giuseppe Vavassori
- (Ivory Coast) Abdoulaye Bamba
- (Ivory Coast) Christian Manfredini
- (Liechtenstein) Marcel Büchel
- (Lithuania) Vykintas Slivka
- (Peru) Gianluca Lapadula
- (Romania) Radu Drăgușin
- (Russia) Viktor Budyanskiy
- (San Marino) Edoardo Colombo
- (Senegal) Franck Kanouté
- (Slovakia) Jakub Hromada
- (Somalia) Ayub Daud
- (Spain) Dean Huijsen
- (Sweden) Andreas Isaksson
- (Switzerland) Davide Chiumiento
- (Switzerland) Andi Zeqiri
- (Tunisia) Hamza Rafia
- (Turkey) **Kenan Yıldız**
- (Uruguay) Franco Israel
- (Uruguay) César Pellegrín
- (Venezuela) Christian Makoun
- (Uzbekistan) Ilyos Zeytulayev

== See also ==
- Juventus Next Gen, reserve team

== Bibliography ==
- Caroli, Angelo (1987). Ho conosciuto la Signora (in Italian). Editrice Graphot.
- Giacone, Gianni (1993). Juve Azzurri – I bianconeri che hanno fatto grande la Nazionale (in Italian). Hurrà Juventus – Fabbri Editori.
- Hurrà Juventus Editorial Staff (2004) [2001]. Hurrà Juventus (Juventus F.C. Official Sportive Magazine) (in Italian). Cantelli Editore.
