= 2020–21 Serie B =

Italian football league season

Serie B
- Season: 2020–21
- Dates: Regular season: 25 September 2020 – 10 May 2021; Play-offs: 13 May 2021 – 27 May 2021
- Champions: Empoli (3rd title)
- Promoted: Empoli; Salernitana; Venezia (via play-off)
- Relegated: Chievo (disbanded); Reggiana; Pescara; Virtus Entella
- Matches: 380
- Goals: 913 (2.4 per match)
- Top goalscorer: Massimo Coda (22 goals)
- Biggest home win: Lecce 7–1 Reggiana (21 November 2020)
- Biggest away win: Virtus Entella 1–5 Lecce (8 November 2020); Reggiana 0–4 Lecce (7 March 2021); Reggina 0–4 Frosinone (10 May 2021)
- Highest scoring: Vicenza 4–4 Pisa (31 October 2020); Lecce 7–1 Reggiana (21 November 2020)
- Longest winning run: Lecce; SPAL (6 games)
- Longest unbeaten run: Empoli (28 games)
- Longest winless run: Virtus Entella (19 games)
- Longest losing run: Virtus Entella (6 games)
- Total attendance: 51,222
- Average attendance: 96

The 2020–21 Serie B (known as the Serie BKT for sponsorship reasons) was the 89th season of the Serie B since its establishment in 1929. It started on 25 September 2020 and ended on 10 May 2021.

On 5 November 2020, Serie B announced it would use VAR from the second half of the season. However, it was used only on promotion play-off matches. DAZN broadcast all matches live domestically, with MyCujoo further distributing games in 15 countries.

== Changes ==
The following teams have changed division since the 2019–20 season:

=== To Serie B ===
Relegated from Serie A

- Lecce
- Brescia
- SPAL

Promoted from Serie C

- Monza (Group A)
- Vicenza (Group B)
- Reggina (Group C)
- Reggiana (Play-off winners)

=== From Serie B ===
Promoted to Serie A

- Benevento
- Crotone
- Spezia

Relegated to Serie C

- Perugia
- Trapani
- Juve Stabia
- Livorno

== Teams ==
=== Stadiums and locations ===
Location of teams in 2020–21 Serie B

Team	Home city	Stadium	Capacity	2019–20 season
Ascoli	Ascoli Piceno	Stadio Cino e Lillo Del Duca	11,326	14th in Serie B
Brescia	Brescia	Stadio Mario Rigamonti	19,550	19th in Serie A
Chievo	Verona	Stadio Marc'Antonio Bentegodi	31,045	6th in Serie B
Cittadella	Cittadella (Padua)	Stadio Pier Cesare Tombolato	7,623	5th in Serie B
Cosenza	Cosenza	Stadio San Vito-Gigi Marulla	20,987	15th in Serie B
Cremonese	Cremona	Stadio Giovanni Zini	16,003	12th in Serie B
Empoli	Empoli (Florence)	Stadio Carlo Castellani	16,284	7th in Serie B
Frosinone	Frosinone	Stadio Benito Stirpe	16,227	8th in Serie B
Lecce	Lecce	Stadio Via del Mare	31,533	18th in Serie A
Monza	Monza	Stadio Brianteo	10,000	Serie C Group A Champions
Pescara	Pescara	Stadio Adriatico – Giovanni Cornacchia	20,515	17th in Serie B
Pisa	Pisa	Arena Garibaldi – Romeo Anconetani	10,000	9th in Serie B
Pordenone	Pordenone	Stadio Guido Teghil (Lignano Sabbiadoro)	5,000	4th in Serie B
Reggiana	Reggio Emilia	Mapei Stadium – Città del Tricolore	21,525	2nd in Serie C Group B, play-off winner
Reggina	Reggio Calabria	Stadio Oreste Granillo	27,543	Serie C Group C Champions
Salernitana	Salerno	Stadio Arechi	37,000	10th in Serie B
SPAL	Ferrara	Stadio Paolo Mazza	16,134	20th in Serie A
Venezia	Venice	Stadio Pier Luigi Penzo	7,371	11th in Serie B
Vicenza	Vicenza	Stadio Romeo Menti	13,173	Serie C Group B Champions
Virtus Entella	Chiavari (Genoa)	Comunale Aldo Gastaldi	5,500	13th in Serie B

=== Personnel and kits ===
Team	President	Manager	Captain	Kit manufacturer	Shirt sponsor (front)	Shirt sponsor (back)	Shirt sponsor (sleeve)	Shorts sponsor
Ascoli	(Italy) Carlo Neri	(Italy) Andrea Sottil	(Italy) Riccardo Brosco	Nike	Fainplast, Bricofer	Bricofer	Ecotel Italia	Sky Network/Gruppo Boero
Brescia	(Italy) Massimo Cellino	(Spain) Pep Clotet	(Italy) Dimitri Bisoli	Kappa	UBI Banca	Officine Meccaniche Rezzatesi	None	None
Chievo	(Italy) Luca Campedelli	(Italy) Alfredo Aglietti	(Serbia) Filip Đorđević	Givova	Mitsubishi Motors/Paluani, Coati Salumi	Nobis Assicurazioni	Avelia	Vicentini Carni
Cittadella	(Italy) Andrea Gabrielli	(Italy) Roberto Venturato	(Italy) Manuel Iori	Mizuno	Sirmax, Gabrielli	Gavinox (H)/Quartzforms (A)	OCSA	Metalservice
Cosenza	(Italy) Eugenio Guarascio	(Italy) Roberto Occhiuzzi	(Italy) Angelo Corsi	Legea	Quattropuntozero, Concessionaria Carlomagno	None	La Valle Viaggi	None
Cremonese	(Italy) Paolo Rossi	(Italy) Fabio Pecchia	(Italy) Emanuele Terranova	Acerbis	Ilta Inox (H)/Arinox (A), Arvedi	Fattorie Cremona	Arvedi Tubi Acciaio	None
Empoli	(Italy) Fabrizio Corsi	(Italy) Alessio Dionisi	(Italy) Simone Romagnoli	Kappa	Computer Gross, Sammontana (H)/Logli Massimo (A)	Pediatrica	Inpa	ChiantiBanca
Frosinone	(Italy) Maurizio Stirpe	(Italy) Alessandro Nesta	(Italy) Nicolò Brighenti	Zeus	Banca Popolare del Frusinate	Acea	Polsinelli Enologia	None
Lecce	(Italy) Saverio Sticchi Damiani	(Italy) Eugenio Corini	(Italy) Marco Mancosu	M908	Links Management & Technology, Pasta Maffei	Barocco SpA	Banca Popolare Pugliese	Asfalti Isolbit
Monza	(Italy) Paolo Berlusconi	(Italy) Cristian Brocchi	(Italy) Andrea D'Errico	Lotto	WithU, U-Power	Febal Casa	Pontenossa	Dell'Orto
Pescara	(Italy) Daniele Sebastiani	(Italy) Gianluca Grassadonia	(Italy) Vincenzo Fiorillo	Erreà	Contrader, TecnoRex	Liofilchem	Industria Vernici e Colori	Pharmapiù Sport
Pisa	(Italy) Giuseppe Corrado	(Italy) Luca D'Angelo	(Austria) Robert Gucher	Adidas	Cetilar, Synlab	Hi-Turf Solution	Despe	Mercedes-Benz Palumbo Auto
Pordenone	(Italy) Mauro Lovisa	(Italy) Maurizio Domizzi	(Italy) Mirko Stefani	Joma	Omega Group, Assiteca (H)/6sicuro (A)	Lignano Sabbiadoro	Alea Office	CRO Area Giovani
Reggiana	(Italy) Luca Quintavalli	(Italy) Massimiliano Alvini	(Italy) Paolo Rozzio	Macron	Immergas, Conad (H)/Tutto per l'Imballo (A)/Safim Architettura	Alfa Romeo Autostile	Righi Food	Azimut Investments
Reggina	(Italy) Luca Gallo	(Italy) Marco Baroni	(Italy) Giuseppe Loiacono	Macron	Bencivenni Gruppo Volkswagen, Puliservice Frontale	Multi Service 5D	Caffè Mauro	D. Caracciolo & figli
Salernitana	(Italy) Marco Mezzaroma & (Italy) Claudio Lotito	(Italy) Fabrizio Castori	(Italy) Francesco Di Tacchio	Zeus	Meda Supermercati/Real Sud EqualQuality/BCC Aquara/Centri Verrengia/Check-Up Centro Polidiagnostico/Real Sud/Gruppo Noviello/Ethos Grafica/San Matteo New York/Smyb Business Logistics, Gruppo Noviello	New Energy Gas e Luce	Real Sud	Obiettivo Ristrutturare/Ethos Grafica/BTL Industries
SPAL	(Italy) Walter Mattioli	(Italy) Massimo Rastelli	(Italy) Sergio Floccari	Macron	Adamant BioNRG, Omega Group	Errebi Technology	Pentaferte	None
Venezia	(United States) Duncan L. Niederauer	(Italy) Paolo Zanetti	(Italy) Marco Modolo	Nike	Fluorsid	IBSA Group	Don Peppe	Stevanato Prodotti e Lavori Speciali
Vicenza	(Italy) Renzo Rosso	(Italy) Domenico Di Carlo	(Italy) Stefano Giacomelli	Lotto	Diesel, Aon (H)/Sergio Bassan John Deere (A)	Protek (H)/Famila (A)	Legor (H)	Zanutta (H)
Virtus Entella	(Italy) Antonio Gozzi	(Italy) Vincenzo Vivarini	(Italy) Luca Nizzetto	Adidas	Duferco Energia	None	None	Kia Gecar

=== Managerial changes ===
Team	Outgoing manager	Manner of departure	Date of vacancy	Position in table	Replaced by	Date of appointment
Salernitana	(Italy) Gian Piero Ventura	End of contract	1 August 2020	Pre-season	(Italy) Fabrizio Castori	10 August 2020
Pescara	(Italy) Andrea Sottil	End of contract	1 August 2020	Pre-season	(Italy) Massimo Oddo	29 August 2020
SPAL	(Italy) Luigi Di Biagio	End of contract	2 August 2020	Pre-season	(Italy) Pasquale Marino	12 August 2020
Venezia	(Italy) Alessio Dionisi	Mutual consent	10 August 2020	Pre-season	(Italy) Paolo Zanetti	14 August 2020
Empoli	(Italy) Pasquale Marino	Mutual consent	11 August 2020	Pre-season	(Italy) Alessio Dionisi	19 August 2020
Virtus Entella	(Italy) Roberto Boscaglia	Resigned	14 August 2020	Pre-season	(Italy) Bruno Tedino	17 August 2020
Lecce	(Italy) Fabio Liverani	Sacked	19 August 2020	Pre-season	(Italy) Eugenio Corini	22 August 2020
Brescia	(Uruguay) Diego López	Mutual consent	20 August 2020	Pre-season	(Italy) Luigi Delneri	4 September 2020
Ascoli	(Italy) Davide Dionigi	Sacked	24 August 2020	Pre-season	(Italy) Valerio Bertotto	25 August 2020
Brescia	(Italy) Luigi Delneri	Sacked	6 October 2020	20th	(Uruguay) Diego López	6 October 2020
Virtus Entella	(Italy) Bruno Tedino	Sacked	23 November 2020	18th	(Italy) Vincenzo Vivarini	25 November 2020
Ascoli	(Italy) Valerio Bertotto	Sacked	29 November 2020	17th	(Italy) Delio Rossi	29 November 2020
Pescara	(Italy) Massimo Oddo	Sacked	29 November 2020	20th	(Italy) Roberto Breda	29 November 2020
Brescia	(Uruguay) Diego López	Sacked	7 December 2020	12th	(Italy) Daniele Gastaldello (caretaker)	7 December 2020
Brescia	(Italy) Daniele Gastaldello	End of caretaker spell	10 December 2020	11th	(Italy) Davide Dionigi	10 December 2020
Reggina	(Italy) Domenico Toscano	Sacked	14 December 2020	15th	(Italy) Marco Baroni	15 December 2020
Ascoli	(Italy) Delio Rossi	Sacked	22 December 2020	19th	(Italy) Andrea Sottil	23 December 2020
Cremonese	(Italy) Pierpaolo Bisoli	Sacked	7 January 2021	16th	(Italy) Fabio Pecchia	7 January 2021
Brescia	(Italy) Davide Dionigi	Sacked	3 February 2021	13th	(Spain) Pep Clotet	5 February 2021
Pescara	(Italy) Roberto Breda	Sacked	14 February 2021	20th	(Italy) Gianluca Grassadonia	14 February 2021
SPAL	(Italy) Pasquale Marino	Sacked	16 March 2021	8th	(Italy) Massimo Rastelli	16 March 2021
Frosinone	(Italy) Alessandro Nesta	Sacked	22 March 2021	12th	(Italy) Fabio Grosso	23 March 2021
Pordenone	(Italy) Attilio Tesser	Sacked	3 April 2021	15th	(Italy) Maurizio Domizzi	3 April 2021
Virtus Entella	(Italy) Vincenzo Vivarini	Sacked	12 April 2021	20th	(Italy) Gennaro Volpe	12 April 2021

== League table ==
Pos	Team	Pld	W	D	L	GF	GA	GD	Pts	Promotion, qualification or relegation
1	Empoli (C, P)	38	19	16	3	68	35	+33	73	Promotion to Serie A
2	Salernitana (P)	38	19	12	7	46	34	+12	69	Promotion to Serie A
3	Monza	38	17	13	8	51	33	+18	64	Qualification for promotion play-offs semi-finals
4	Lecce	38	16	14	8	68	47	+21	62	Qualification for promotion play-offs semi-finals
5	Venezia (O, P)	38	15	14	9	53	39	+14	59	Qualification for promotion play-offs preliminary round
6	Cittadella	38	15	12	11	48	35	+13	57	Qualification for promotion play-offs preliminary round
7	Brescia	38	15	11	12	61	53	+8	56 (Note: Head-to-head points: Brescia 9, Chievo 5, SPAL 2.)	Qualification for promotion play-offs preliminary round
8	Chievo (D, R)	38	14	14	10	50	37	+13	56	Bankruptcy
9	SPAL	38	14	14	10	44	42	+2	56	
10	Frosinone	38	12	14	12	38	42	−4	50 (Note: Frosinone finished ahead of Reggina on head-to-head points: Frosinone 1–1 Reggina, Reggina 0–4 Frosinone.)	
11	Reggina	38	12	14	12	42	45	−3	50	
12	Vicenza	38	11	15	12	48	53	−5	48 (Note: Head-to-head points: Vicenza 8, Cremonese 4, Pisa 3.)	
13	Cremonese	38	12	12	14	46	44	+2	48	
14	Pisa	38	11	15	12	54	59	−5	48	
15	Pordenone	38	10	15	13	40	39	+1	45	
16	Ascoli (Note: Since the 16th-placed team Ascoli finished more than 4 points ahead of the 17th-placed team Cosenza, the relegation play-out was not played and Cosenza were originally relegated directly. However, Cosenza was ultimately spared from relegation following Chievo's bankruptcy and subsequent dissolution.)	38	11	11	16	37	48	−11	44	
17	Cosenza (T)	38	6	17	15	29	47	−18	35	Spared from relegation
18	Reggiana (R)	38	9	7	22	31	57	−26	34	Relegation to Serie C
19	Pescara (R)	38	7	11	20	29	60	−31	32	Relegation to Serie C
20	Virtus Entella (R)	38	4	11	23	30	64	−34	23	Relegation to Serie C

Source: Lega Serie B (in Italian), Soccerway (in English)
Rules for classification: 1) Points; 2) Head-to-head points; 3) Head-to-head goal difference; 4) Goal difference; 5) Goals scored; 6) Draw.
(C) Champions; (D) Disqualified; (O) Play-off winners; (P) Promoted; (R) Relegated; (T) Qualified, but not yet for the particular phase indicated

=== Positions by round ===
The table lists the positions of teams after each week of matches. In order to preserve chronological evolvements, any postponed matches are not included to the round at which they were originally scheduled, but added to the full round they were played immediately afterwards.

Team ╲ Round	1	2	3	4	5	6	7	8	9	10	11	12	13	14	15	16	17	18	19	20	21	22	23	24	25	26	27	28	29	30	31	32	33	34	35	36	37	38
Empoli	2	4	3	2	1	1	1	1	3	4	2	1	1	2	2	1	1	1	1	1	1	1	1	1	1	1	1	1	1	1	1	1	1	1	1	1	1	1
Salernitana	9	6	2	3	2	4	7	2	1	1	1	2	2	1	1	2	2	5	3	4	4	4	5	3	3	4	3	3	4	3	4	3	3	3	3	2	2	2
Monza	13	13	14	13	15	11	9	9	9	9	9	8	8	6	4	3	4	4	2	2	2	3	3	2	2	3	2	2	2	4	3	4	5	4	4	4	3	3
Lecce	12	5	9	8	9	8	5	3	2	3	4	5	7	8	7	6	6	6	7	7	7	8	8	7	6	6	5	4	3	2	2	2	2	2	2	3	4	4
Venezia	3	8	10	4	6	6	3	5	5	6	6	6	6	7	8	8	7	10	9	9	9	7	6	4	4	2	4	5	5	5	5	5	4	5	5	5	5	5
Cittadella	1	1	1	1	3	5	8	8	7	7	7	7	4	3	3	4	3	2	4	5	5	5	4	6	5	7	7	6	6	6	8	7	8	8	6	6	6	6
Brescia	7	20	7	11	12	12	10	10	11	12	11	11	10	10	11	11	11	13	13	13	13	14	13	16	16	14	14	12	10	10	9	9	9	10	10	8	8	7
Chievo	10	14	8	5	5	2	2	6	8	8	8	9	9	9	9	9	9	7	6	3	3	2	2	5	7	5	6	7	7	8	7	8	7	7	8	7	7	8
SPAL	16	12	12	14	8	7	6	4	4	2	3	4	5	4	5	5	5	3	5	6	6	6	7	8	8	8	8	8	8	7	6	6	6	6	7	9	9	9
Frosinone	20	7	4	6	4	3	4	7	6	5	5	3	3	5	6	7	8	9	10	10	10	10	10	9	10	10	10	10	11	12	13	14	14	14	14	11	12	10
Reggina	8	3	5	7	7	9	13	13	15	13	15	16	18	18	17	13	14	15	15	16	16	13	14	12	12	12	12	11	12	13	12	11	10	9	9	10	10	11
Vicenza	18	15	18	19	19	18	14	16	12	15	14	14	13	13	13	14	13	12	12	12	12	12	12	14	15	13	11	13	13	11	10	10	12	13	12	14	14	12
Cremonese	19	17	15	16	16	19	20	20	19	17	17	17	16	14	14	16	17	14	14	15	15	15	17	15	13	15	15	15	14	14	14	13	11	11	11	12	11	13
Pisa	4	9	17	18	18	17	17	14	16	14	13	13	12	11	10	12	12	11	11	11	11	11	11	10	9	9	9	9	9	9	11	12	13	12	13	13	13	14
Pordenone	15	11	11	15	13	10	11	11	10	10	12	12	11	12	12	10	10	8	8	8	8	9	9	11	11	11	13	14	15	15	15	15	15	15	15	15	16	15
Ascoli	6	16	20	12	14	16	16	17	17	19	19	19	19	19	19	20	20	20	20	18	18	17	18	18	18	19	18	18	18	18	18	17	16	16	16	16	15	16
Cosenza	11	10	13	10	10	13	15	12	13	16	16	15	15	16	16	15	16	16	17	14	14	16	16	17	17	17	17	17	17	16	16	16	17	17	17	17	17	17
Reggiana	5	2	6	9	11	14	12	15	14	11	10	10	14	15	15	17	18	18	16	17	17	18	15	13	14	16	16	16	16	17	17	18	18	18	18	18	18	18
Pescara	14	18	19	20	20	20	19	19	20	18	18	18	17	17	18	18	15	17	19	20	20	20	20	19	19	18	19	19	19	19	19	19	19	19	19	19	19	19
Virtus Entella	17	19	16	17	17	15	18	18	18	20	20	20	20	20	20	19	19	19	18	19	19	19	19	20	20	20	20	20	20	20	20	20	20	20	20	20	20	20

Champions, promotion to Serie A
Promotion to Serie A
Play-off semifinals
Play-off preliminary round
Relegation to Serie C

Source: Serie BKT (in Italian), worldfootball.net (in English)

== Results ==
Home \ Away	ASC	BRE	CHI	CIT	COS	CRE	EMP	FRO	LEC	MON	PES	PIS	POR	RGA	RGI	SAL	SPA	VEN	VIC	ENT
Ascoli	—	2–1	0–0	2–0	0–3	0–0	2–0	1–1	0–2	1–0	0–2	0–2	0–1	2–1	2–1	0–2	2–0	1–1	2–1	1–1
Brescia	1–1	—	1–0	3–3	2–0	1–2	1–3	1–2	3–0	0–1	1–1	4–3	4–1	3–1	1–0	3–1	3–1	2–2	0–3	2–2
Chievo	3–0	1–0	—	2–1	2–0	1–1	1–1	0–0	1–2	0–1	3–1	2–0	3–0	1–0	3–0	1–2	1–1	1–1	1–2	2–1
Cittadella	1–0	3–0	1–0	—	1–1	1–1	2–2	1–0	2–2	1–2	0–1	2–0	2–0	0–3	1–1	0–0	2–0	1–1	3–0	1–0
Cosenza	2–1	1–2	1–0	1–1	—	0–1	0–2	1–2	1–1	0–3	3–0	1–1	0–0	0–1	2–2	0–1	1–1	0–0	1–1	0–0
Cremonese	3–3	2–2	0–2	0–2	1–0	—	2–2	4–0	1–2	0–2	3–0	2–1	2–1	3–0	1–1	0–1	1–1	0–0	0–1	2–1
Empoli	1–1	4–2	2–2	1–1	4–0	1–0	—	3–1	2–1	0–0	2–2	3–1	1–0	0–0	3–0	5–0	2–1	1–1	2–2	1–0
Frosinone	1–0	0–1	3–2	1–1	0–2	1–0	0–2	—	0–3	2–2	0–0	3–1	1–1	0–0	1–1	0–0	1–2	1–2	1–1	0–0
Lecce	1–2	2–2	4–2	1–3	3–1	2–2	2–2	2–2	—	0–0	3–1	0–3	0–0	7–1	2–2	2–0	1–2	2–2	2–1	0–0
Monza	2–0	0–2	1–2	0–0	2–2	2–1	1–1	2–0	1–0	—	1–1	0–2	2–0	2–0	1–0	3–0	0–0	1–4	1–1	5–0
Pescara	2–3	1–1	0–0	3–1	0–0	0–2	1–2	0–2	1–1	3–2	—	3–1	0–2	1–0	0–2	0–3	0–1	0–2	2–3	1–1
Pisa	2–1	1–0	2–2	1–4	3–0	1–1	1–1	0–0	0–1	1–1	0–0	—	1–0	1–0	0–0	2–2	3–0	2–2	2–2	3–2
Pordenone	1–1	1–1	1–1	0–1	2–0	1–2	0–0	2–0	1–1	1–1	0–0	2–2	—	3–0	2–2	1–2	3–3	2–0	1–2	3–0
Reggiana	1–0	2–2	0–1	0–2	1–1	1–1	0–1	1–2	0–4	3–0	0–1	2–2	1–0	—	0–1	0–0	1–2	2–1	2–1	2–1
Reggina	2–2	2–1	1–1	1–3	0–0	1–0	0–3	0–4	0–1	1–0	3–1	1–2	1–0	2–1	—	0–0	0–1	1–2	3–0	1–0
Salernitana	1–0	1–0	1–1	1–0	0–0	2–1	2–0	1–0	1–1	1–3	2–0	4–1	0–2	3–0	1–1	—	0–0	2–1	1–1	2–1
SPAL	1–2	2–3	0–0	1–0	1–1	1–0	1–1	0–1	1–0	1–1	2–0	4–0	1–3	2–0	1–4	2–0	—	1–1	3–2	0–0
Venezia	2–1	0–1	3–1	1–0	3–0	3–1	2–0	0–2	2–3	0–2	4–0	1–1	0–0	2–1	0–2	1–2	0–0	—	1–0	3–2
Vicenza	2–1	0–3	1–1	1–0	1–1	3–1	0–2	0–0	1–2	1–2	1–0	4–4	1–1	2–1	1–1	1–1	2–2	0–0	—	0–1
Virtus Entella	0–0	1–1	1–3	1–0	1–2	0–2	2–5	2–3	1–5	1–1	3–0	2–1	0–1	0–2	1–1	0–3	0–1	0–2	1–2	—

Source: Serie B (in Italian), Soccerway (in English)
Legend: Blue = home team win; Yellow = draw; Red = away team win.

== Promotion play-offs ==
Rules:

- Preliminary round: the higher-placed team plays at home. If teams are tied after regular time, extra-time is played. If scores are still level, the higher-placed team advances;
- Semi-finals: the higher-placed team plays at home for second leg. If teams are tied on aggregate, the higher-placed team advances;
- Final: the higher-placed team plays at home for second leg. If teams are tied on aggregate, the higher-placed team is promoted to Serie A, unless the teams finished tied on points after regular season, in which case winner is decided by extra-time and a penalty shootout if necessary.

Preliminary round
6	Cittadella	1
7	Brescia	0
5	Venezia (a.e.t.)	3
8	Chievo	2

Semi-finals
6	Cittadella	3	0	3
3	Monza	0	2	2
5	Venezia	1	1	2
4	Lecce	0	1	1

Final
6	Cittadella	0	1	1
5	Venezia	1	1	2

=== Preliminary round ===
13 May 2021	Cittadella	1–0	Brescia	Cittadella
18:00 CEST (UTC+2)	Proia 40'	Report		Stadium: Pier Cesare Tombolato; Attendance: 0 Referee: Ivan Pezzuto

13 May 2021	Venezia	3–2 (a.e.t.)	Chievo	Venice
21:00 CEST (UTC+2)	Bertagnoli 60' (o.g.); Maleh 107'; Johnsen 116'	Report	Garritano 10' (pen.); Mogoș 104' (pen.)	Stadium: Pierluigi Penzo; Attendance: 0 Referee: Simone Sozza

=== Semi-finals ===
==== First leg ====
17 May 2021	Cittadella	3–0	Monza	Cittadella
18:30 CEST (UTC+2)	Baldini 13', 22', 85'	Report		Stadium: Pier Cesare Tombolato; Attendance: 0 Referee: Giovanni Ayroldi

17 May 2021	Venezia	1–0	Lecce	Venice
20:45 CEST (UTC+2)	Forte 47'	Report		Stadium: Pierluigi Penzo; Attendance: 0 Referee: Valerio Marini

==== Second leg ====
20 May 2021	Lecce	1–1 (1–2 agg.)	Venezia	Lecce
18:30 CEST (UTC+2)	Pettinari 66'	Report	Aramu 45+3'	Stadium: Via del Mare; Attendance: 0 Referee: Massimiliano Irrati

20 May 2021	Monza	2–0 (2–3 agg.)	Cittadella	Monza
20:45 CEST (UTC+2)	Balotelli 58'; D'Alessandro 78'	Report		Stadium: Brianteo; Attendance: 0 Referee: Juan Luca Sacchi

=== Final ===
==== First leg ====
23 May 2021	Cittadella	0–1	Venezia	Cittadella
21:15 CEST (UTC+2)		Report	Di Mariano 50'	Stadium: Pier Cesare Tombolato; Attendance: 0 Referee: Simone Sozza

==== Second leg ====
27 May 2021	Venezia	1–1 (2–1 agg.)	Cittadella	Venice
21:15 CEST (UTC+2)	Bocalon 90+3'	Report	Proia 25'	Stadium: Pierluigi Penzo; Attendance: 0 Referee: Daniele Orsato

== Relegation play-out ==
The relegation play-out was not played because the 16th-placed team Ascoli finished more than 4 points ahead of 17th-placed team Cosenza, then they were relegated directly to Serie C. Cosenza was later readmitted to replace the excluded Chievo.

== Season statistics ==
=== Top goalscorers ===
Rank	Player	Club	Goals
1	(Italy) Massimo Coda	Lecce	22
2	(Italy) Leonardo Mancuso	Empoli	20
3	(France) Florian Ayé	Brescia	16
4	(Italy) Francesco Forte^{1}	Venezia	15
5	(Italy) Michele Marconi	Pisa	13
5	(Italy) Gennaro Tutino	Salernitana	13
7	(Bosnia and Herzegovina) Riad Bajić	Ascoli	12
8	(Italy) Daniel Ciofani	Cremonese	11
8	(Italy) Davide Diaw	Pordenone (10); Monza (1)	11
8	(Italy) Andrea La Mantia	Empoli	11
8	(Italy) Riccardo Meggiorini	Vicenza	11
8	(United States) Andrija Novakovich	Frosinone	11
8	(Italy) Mattia Valoti	SPAL	11

Note

^{1} Player scored 1 goal in the play-offs.

=== Hat-tricks ===
Player	Club	Against	Result	Date
(Italy) Massimo Coda	Lecce	Reggiana	7–1 (H)	21 November 2020
(Bosnia and Herzegovina) Riad Bajić	Ascoli	Cremonese	3–3 (A)	12 December 2020
(Italy) Leonardo Mancuso^{4}	Empoli	Virtus Entella	5–2 (A)	12 December 2020
(Italy) Mattia Aramu	Venezia	Monza	4–1 (A)	20 March 2021
(France) Florian Ayé	Brescia	Pisa	4–3 (H)	7 May 2021
(United States) Andrija Novakovich	Frosinone	Reggina	4–0 (A)	10 May 2021
(Italy) Enrico Baldini	Cittadella	Monza	3–0 (H)	17 May 2021

Note

^{4} Player scored four goals; (H) – Home (A) – Away

=== Clean sheets ===
Rank	Player	Club	Clean sheets	Rounds
1	(Slovenia) Vid Belec	Salernitana	14	5, 9–10, 13, 19–20, 27–30, 32–33, 37–38
2	(Italy) Michele Di Gregorio^{1}	Monza	13	11–12, 14–17, 19, 24–25, 27, 36–37
2	(Italy) Samuele Perisan	Pordenone	13	6, 9–10, 13, 16–19, 28, 32, 34, 37–38
2	(Croatia) Adrian Šemper	Chievo	13	1, 3–4, 6, 11–12, 17, 19, 22, 26, 29, 33, 38
5	(Italy) Alberto Brignoli	Empoli	12	1–2, 7, 14, 17–18, 26, 28–30, 33, 36
6	(Italy) Francesco Bardi	Frosinone	11	2–6, 13, 16, (Note: Played between rounds 20 and 21.) 24, 29, 31, 36
7	(Italy) Wladimiro Falcone	Cosenza	9	4, 8, 12, 14, 16, 19, 25, 28, 35
7	(Italy) Vincenzo Fiorillo	Pescara	9	1, 10, 12, 16–17, 24, 26, 28, 36
7	(Brazil) Gabriel	Lecce	9	1–2, 17–18, 26–27, 30–32
7	(Albania) Elhan Kastrati^{2}	Cittadella	9	12, 14, 5, (Note: Played between rounds 17 and 18.) 28–29, 34, 36
7	(Italy) Luca Lezzerini	Venezia	9	1, 3–4, 6, 5, (Note: Played between rounds 7 and 8.) 13–14, 19–20

Note

^{1} Player kept 1 clean sheet in the play-offs.
^{2} Player kept 2 clean sheets in the play-offs.

== Awards ==
=== XI of the Season ===
Pos.	Player	Club	Ref.
GK	(Slovenia) Vid Belec	Salernitana	
DF	(Italy) Pasquale Mazzocchi	Venezia	
DF	(Slovakia) Norbert Gyömbér	Salernitana	
DF	(Croatia) Luka Bogdan	Salernitana	
DF	(Brazil) Carlos Augusto	Monza	
MF	(Italy) Davide Frattesi	Monza	
MF	(Italy) Marco Mancosu	Lecce	
MF	(Morocco) Youssef Maleh	Venezia	
FW	(Italy) Leonardo Mancuso	Empoli	
FW	(Italy) Gennaro Tutino	Salernitana	
FW	(Italy) Massimo Coda	Lecce	
Coach	(Italy) Fabrizio Castori	Salernitana	
