= Serie A Coach of the Month =

Italian Football award

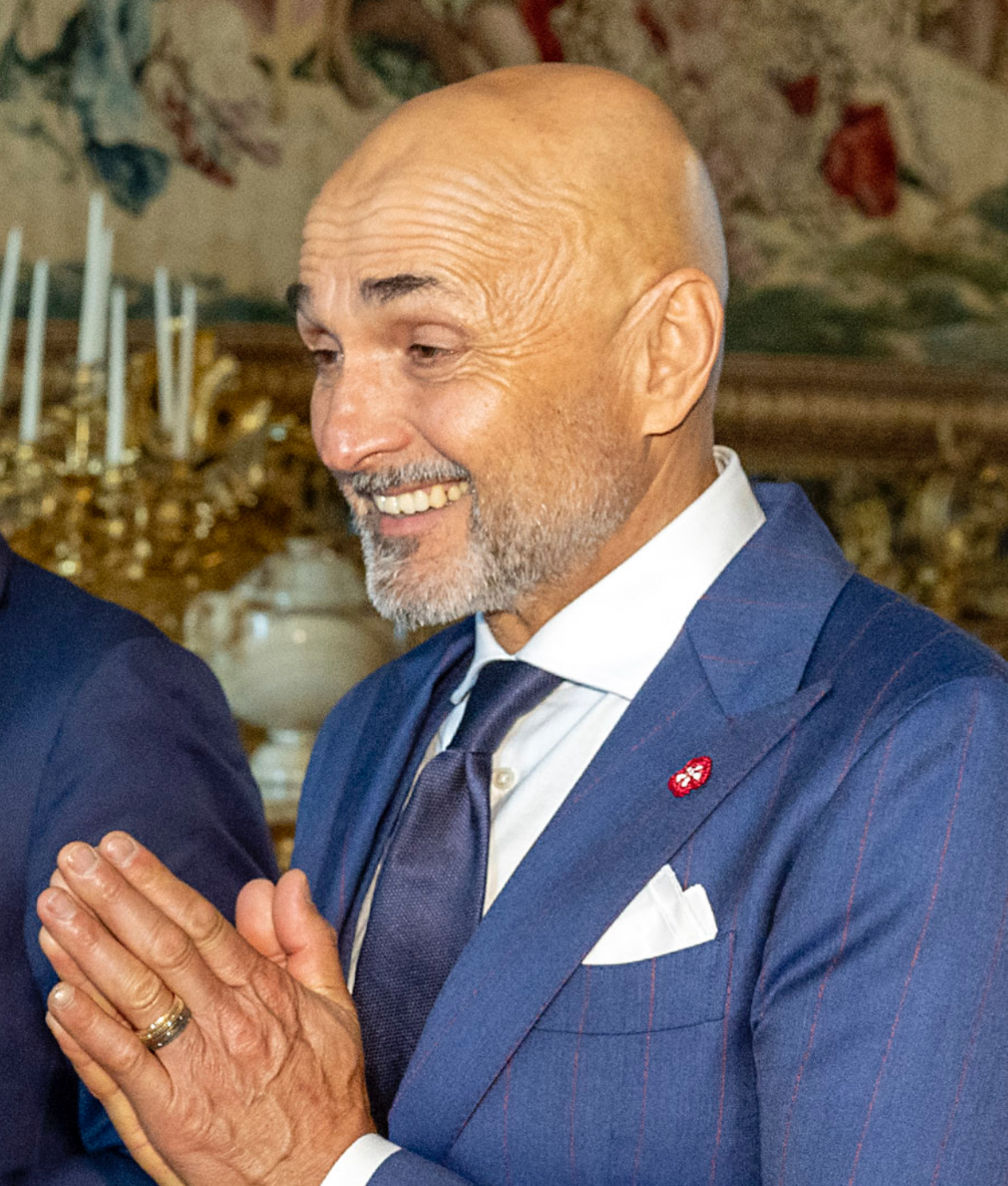
Luciano Spalletti was the inaugural recipient and won the award a joint-record five times.

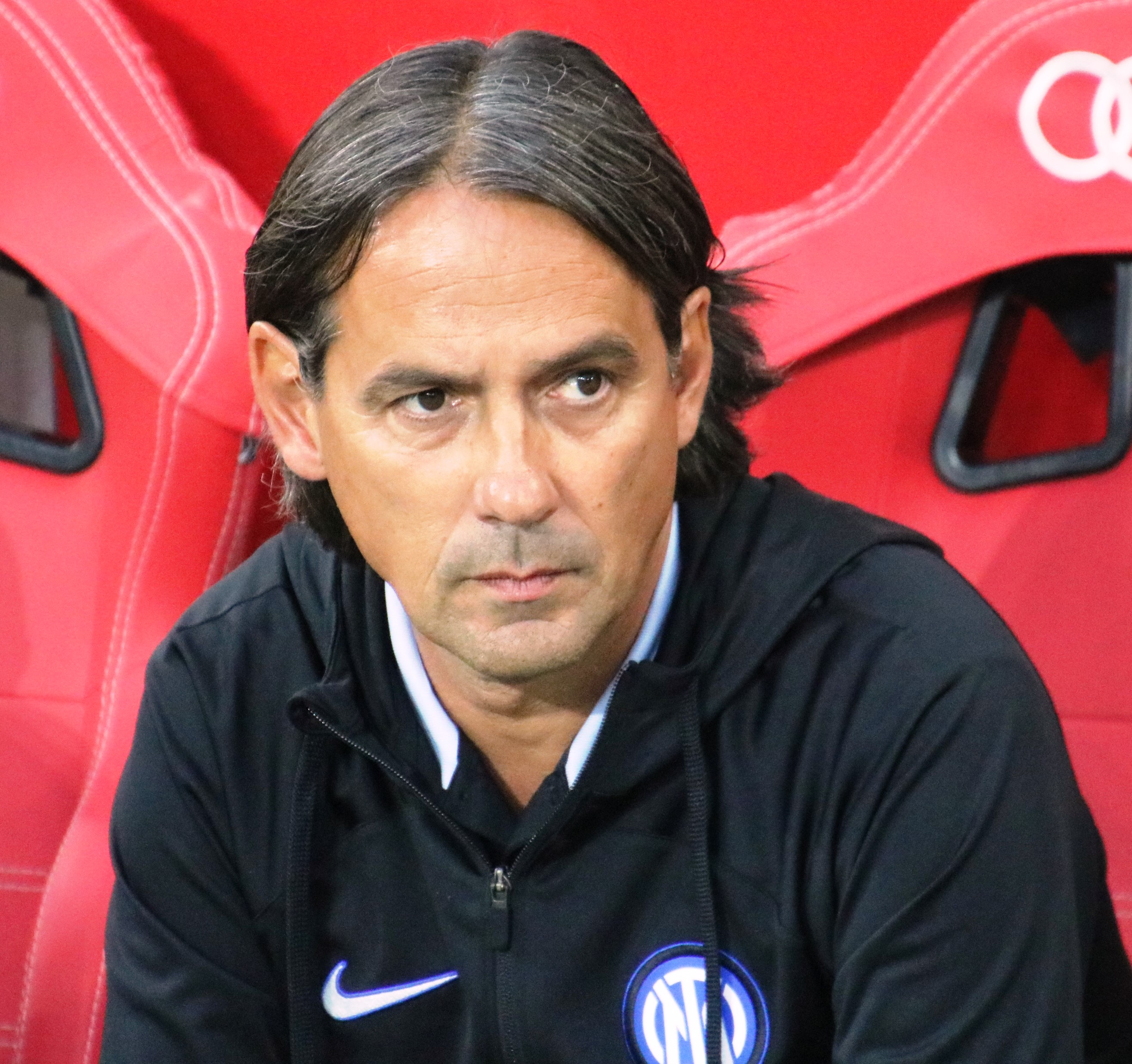
Simone Inzaghi won the award a joint-record five times.

The Serie A Coach of the Month, officially known as the Philadelphia Coach of the Month for sponsorship reasons, is an association football award that recognises the best Serie A head coach each month of the season. The award was introduced for the 2021–22 season.

The first award was assigned to then Napoli manager Luciano Spalletti, who in total has won the award a joint-record five times, alongside Simone Inzaghi. Thiago Motta, Cesc Fàbregas and Cristian Chivu are the only managers to have won the award in consecutive months. The award has been given to twenty-four different coaches, of which nineteen have been Italian, with the only foreign managers awarded being Siniša Mihajlović (Serbia), José Mourinho (Portugal), Cesc Fàbregas (Spain), Cristian Chivu (Romania), and Kosta Runjaić (Germany).

As of October 2026, the most recent winner of the award is Lazio manager Gennaro Gattuso.

== List of winners ==
List of Serie A Coach of the Month winners
Month	Coach	Club	Ref.
2021–22 season
September 2021	(Italy) Luciano Spalletti (1)	Napoli	
October 2021	(Italy) Stefano Pioli (1)	AC Milan	
November 2021	(Italy) Gian Piero Gasperini (1)	Atalanta	
December 2021	(Italy) Simone Inzaghi (1)	Inter Milan	
January 2022	(Italy) Thiago Motta (1)	Spezia	
February 2022	(Italy) Luciano Spalletti (2)	Napoli	
March 2022	(Italy) Stefano Pioli (2)	AC Milan	
April 2022	(Serbia) Siniša Mihajlović	Bologna	
May 2022	(Italy) Stefano Pioli (3)	AC Milan	
2022–23 season
August 2022	(Portugal) José Mourinho	Roma	
September 2022	(Italy) Andrea Sottil	Udinese	
October 2022	(Italy) Luciano Spalletti (3)	Napoli	
November 2022	(Italy) Massimiliano Allegri (1)	Juventus	
January 2023	(Italy) Luciano Spalletti (4)	Napoli	
February 2023	(Italy) Thiago Motta (2)	Bologna	
March 2023	(Italy) Maurizio Sarri	Lazio	
April 2023	(Italy) Raffaele Palladino (1)	Monza	
May 2023	(Italy) Vincenzo Italiano (1)	Fiorentina	
2023–24 season
August 2023	(Italy) Roberto D'Aversa	Lecce	
September 2023	(Italy) Alessio Dionisi	Sassuolo	
October 2023	(Italy) Simone Inzaghi (2)	Inter Milan	
November 2023	(Italy) Massimiliano Allegri (2)	Juventus	
December 2023	(Italy) Vincenzo Italiano (2)	Fiorentina	
January 2024	(Italy) Simone Inzaghi (3)	Inter Milan	
February 2024	(Italy) Thiago Motta (3)	Bologna	
March 2024	(Italy) Thiago Motta (4)	Bologna	
April 2024	(Italy) Simone Inzaghi (4)	Inter Milan	
May 2024	(Italy) Gian Piero Gasperini (2)	Atalanta	
2024–25 season
August 2024	(Italy) Paolo Vanoli	Torino	
September 2024	(Italy) Antonio Conte (1)	Napoli	
October 2024	(Italy) Marco Baroni	Lazio	
November 2024	(Italy) Gian Piero Gasperini (3)	Atalanta	
December 2024	(Italy) Simone Inzaghi (5)	Inter Milan	
January 2025	(Italy) Antonio Conte (2)	Napoli	
February 2025	(Italy) Claudio Ranieri	Roma	
March 2025	(Italy) Vincenzo Italiano (3)	Bologna	
April 2025	(Spain) Cesc Fàbregas (1)	Como	
May 2025	(Spain) Cesc Fàbregas (2)	Como	
2025–26 season
August 2025	(Italy) Davide Nicola	Cremonese	
September 2025	(Italy) Massimiliano Allegri (3)	AC Milan	
October 2025	(Italy) Gian Piero Gasperini (4)	Roma	
November 2025	(Italy) Massimiliano Allegri (4)	AC Milan	
December 2025	(Romania) Cristian Chivu (1)	Inter Milan	
January 2026	(Romania) Cristian Chivu (2)	Inter Milan	
February 2026	(Italy) Raffaele Palladino (2)	Atalanta	
March 2026	(Spain) Cesc Fàbregas (3)	Como	
April 2026	(Italy) Luciano Spalletti (5)	Juventus	
May 2026	(Germany) Kosta Runjaić	Udinese	
2026–27 season
Aug.–Sep. 2026	(Italy) Massimiliano Alvini	Frosinone	
October 2026	(Italy) Gennaro Gattuso	Lazio	

== Multiple winners ==
The following table lists the number of awards won by managers who have won at least two Coach of the Month awards.

Managers in bold are still active in the Serie A.

As of April 2026 award

Rank	Manager	Wins
1	(Italy) Simone Inzaghi	5
1	(Italy) **Luciano Spalletti**	5
3	(Italy) **Massimiliano Allegri**	4
3	(Italy) **Gian Piero Gasperini**	4
3	(Italy) Thiago Motta	4
6	(Spain) **Cesc Fàbregas**	3
6	(Italy) Vincenzo Italiano	3
6	(Italy) Stefano Pioli	3
9	(Romania) **Cristian Chivu**	2
9	(Italy) Antonio Conte	2
9	(Italy) **Raffaele Palladino**	2

== Awards won by club ==
As of October 2026 award

Rank	Club	Managers	Wins
1	Inter Milan	2	7
2	Napoli	2	6
3	Bologna	3	5
3	AC Milan	2	5
5	Atalanta	2	4
6	Como	1	3
6	Juventus	2	3
6	Lazio	3	3
6	Roma	3	3
10	Fiorentina	1	2
10	Udinese	2	2
12	Cremonese	1	1
12	Frosinone	1	1
12	Lecce	1	1
12	Monza	1	1
12	Sassuolo	1	1
12	Spezia	1	1
12	Torino	1	1

== Awards won by nationality ==
As of October 2026 award

Rank	Nationality	Managers	Wins
1	Italy	19	42
2	Spain	1	3
3	Romania	1	2
4	Germany	1	1
4	Portugal	1	1
4	Serbia	1	1

== See also ==
- Serie A Player of the Month
- Serie A Rising Star of the Month
- Serie A Goal of the Month
