= Andrea Sottil =

Italian football player and manager (born 1974)

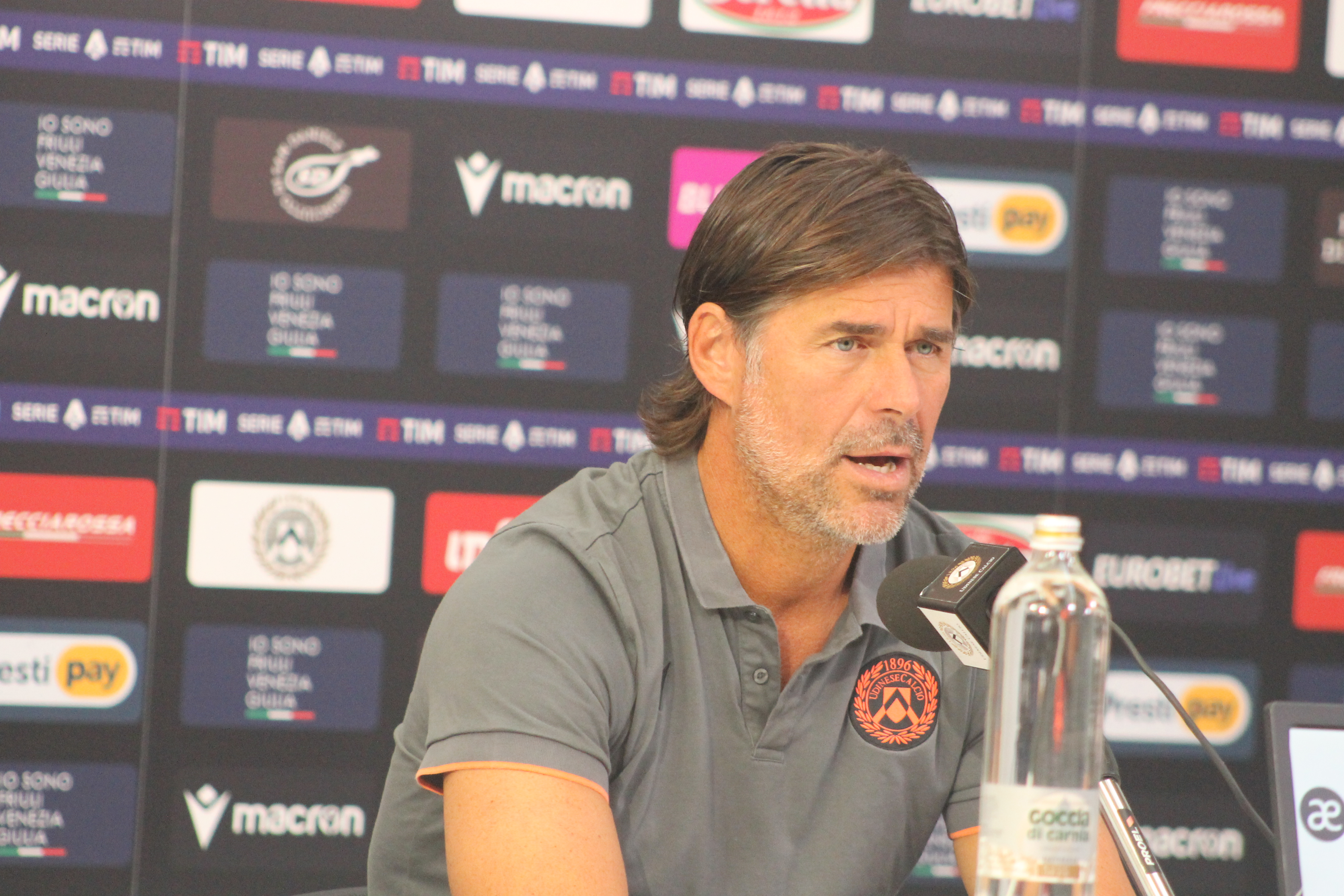

Personal information
- Date of birth: 4 January 1974 (age 52)
- Place of birth: Venaria Reale, Italy
- Height: 1.85 m (6 ft 1 in)
- Position: Defender

Youth career
- 1989–1992: Torino

Senior career*
Years	Team	Apps	(Gls)
1992–1994	Torino	14	(0)
1994–1996	Fiorentina	33	(1)
1996–1999	Atalanta	92	(2)
1999–2003	Udinese	87	(6)
2003–2004	Reggina	25	(1)
2004–2005	Genoa	33	(1)
2006–2008	Catania	66	(2)
2008–2009	Rimini	37	(1)
2009–2010	Alessandria	26	(0)
Total		413	(14)

International career
1990–1992	Italy U19	17	(1)
1994–1995	Italy U21	1	(0)

Managerial career
- 2011–2012: Siracusa
- 2012–2013: Gubbio
- 2013–2014: Cuneo
- 2014–2015: Paganese
- 2015–2017: Siracusa
- 2017–2018: Livorno
- 2018: Livorno
- 2018: Livorno
- 2018–2019: Catania
- 2019: Catania
- 2020: Pescara
- 2020–2022: Ascoli
- 2022–2023: Udinese
- 2024: Salernitana
- 2024: Sampdoria
- 2025–2026: Modena
- * Club domestic league appearances and goals

Andrea Sottil (born 4 January 1974) is an Italian football manager and former footballer who played as a defender. He last managed Serie B club Modena.

== Playing career ==
Sottil started his career with Torino and made his Serie A debut on 6 December 1992, in a 1–1 draw to Foggia. In 1994, he left Torino to join Fiorentina, then moved to Atalanta later in 1996. In 1999, he moved to Udinese, where he also had the opportunity to play at continental level in the UEFA Cup.

Sottil was signed by Reggina in co-ownership deal in summer 2003, along with teammate Gonzalo Martínez. In the summer of 2005, he was signed by Catania, where he was a regular starter in the first two seasons, but only played seven games in 2007–08 Serie A.

In August 2008, he was signed by Rimini. In July 2009 he left for Alessandria. He retired at the end of the 2010–11 season, having amassed over 200 appearances in Serie A throughout his career.

== Coaching career ==
Soon after retirement, Sottil passed the category 2 (UEFA A) coaching exam in June 2011. Later in the summer, he was appointed new head coach of Lega Pro Prima Divisione club Siracusa, with the goal of leading the ambitious Sicilians into the battle for Serie B promotion.

In 2012, he was hired as the coach of Gubbio in Lega Pro Prima Divisione. In 2013, he was appointed the coach of Cuneo in Lega Pro Seconda Divisione. He was fired on 7 January 2014. Ezio Rossi replaced Sottil the next day.

In 2015, Sottil returned to newly-promoted Siracusa, leaving the club in the summer of 2017.

He was re-hired by Livorno on 8 April 2018 after getting fired earlier in the same season.

On 5 July 2018, he was appointed the new coach of Catania. He was fired from Catania on 2 July 2019.

On 7 July 2020, he took his first Serie B managerial role, being named Nicola Legrottaglie's successor at the helm of Pescara in a last-ditch attempt to save the club from relegation. He guided Pescara to safety after defeating Perugia on penalties in a two-legged playoff and was eventually not confirmed for the next season.

On 23 December 2020, he took over as the new head coach of relegation-threatened Serie B side Ascoli, becoming the third manager of the season for the Bianconeri. After guiding Ascoli for two seasons, and reaching the promotion playoffs in his final one in charge of the club, on 6 June 2022, Sottil left the Picchio by mutual consent. The following day, he was announced as the new head coach of Serie A club Udinese.

After guiding Udinese to a mid-table placement in the 2022–23 Serie A campaign, Sottil was dismissed on 24 October 2023 after failing to achieve any wins in the first nine games of the season, leaving Udinese in the relegation zone.

On 20 June 2024, Sottil signed a two-year contract with Serie B club Salernitana. However, he parted ways with Salernitana just a few days later, on 2 July, following the collapse of a planned club takeover and the subsequent decision to shrink the budget for the upcoming season.

On 30 August 2024, Sottil was hired as the new head coach of Serie B club Sampdoria, replacing Andrea Pirlo. He was dismissed just a few months later, on 9 December 2024, after failing to improve the team's results.

On 16 June 2025, Sottil was announced as the new head coach of Serie B club Modena.

== Personal life ==
His son Riccardo Sottil made his Serie A debut for Fiorentina in the 2018–19 season.

== Managerial statistics ==
As of match played 8 December 2024

Managerial record by team and tenure
Team	From	To	Record							
Team	From	To	G	W	D	L	GF	GA	GD	Win %
Siracusa	25 June 2011	22 June 2012	39	19	10	10	51	39	+12	48.72
Gubbio	23 June 2012	23 June 2013	33	12	7	14	40	47	−7	36.36
Cuneo	11 July 2013	7 January 2014	24	8	11	5	34	26	+8	33.33
Paganese	7 October 2014	30 June 2015	31	7	12	12	27	37	−10	22.58
Siracusa	24 September 2015	13 June 2017	77	38	20	19	120	82	+38	49.35
Livorno	6 July 2017	6 March 2018	29	16	7	6	49	30	+19	55.17
Livorno	8 March 2018	19 March 2018	2	1	0	1	3	3	+0	50.00
Livorno	8 April 2018	3 July 2018	6	3	2	1	12	11	+1	50.00
Catania	6 July 2018	25 February 2019	31	18	5	8	48	23	+25	58.06
Catania	6 May 2019	2 July 2019	5	1	4	0	9	6	+3	20.00
Pescara	7 July 2020	28 August 2020	8	2	3	3	8	9	−1	25.00
Ascoli	23 December 2020	6 June 2022	64	29	16	19	80	70	+10	45.31
Udinese	7 June 2022	24 October 2023	49	13	19	17	60	66	−6	26.53
Salernitana	20 June 2024	2 July 2024	0	0	0	0	0	0	+0	—
Sampdoria	30 August 2024	present	14	4	5	5	18	22	−4	28.57
Total			412	171	121	120	559	471	+88	41.50

== Honours ==
=== Player ===
Torino

- Coppa Italia: 1992–93

Fiorentina

- Coppa Italia: 1995–96

Udinese

- UEFA Intertoto Cup: 2000

=== Coach ===
Siracusa

- Serie D: 2015–16 (Group I)

Livorno

- Serie C: 2017–18 (Group A)

Individual

- Serie A Coach of the Month: September 2022
