= Alessio Dionisi =

Italian football manager (born 1980)

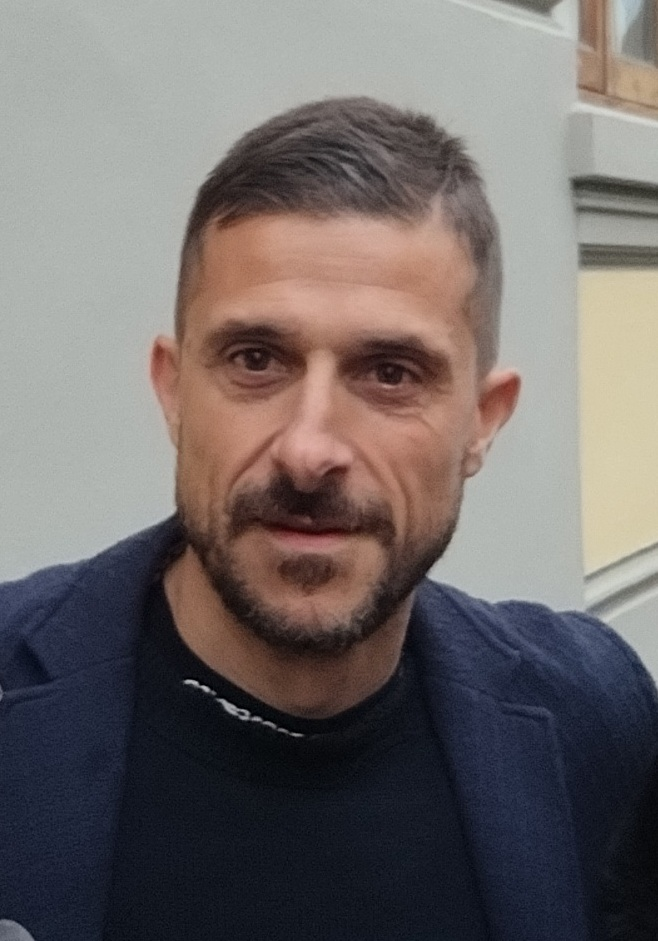
- Dionisi in 2024

Personal information
- Date of birth: 1 April 1980 (age 46)
- Place of birth: Abbadia San Salvatore, Italy
- Position: Centre-back

Youth career
- Siena

Senior career*
Years	Team	Apps	(Gls)
1999–2000	Siena	0	(0)
1999–2000	→ Voghera (loan)	31	(1)
2000–2005	Voghera	142	(8)
2005–2007	Varese	63	(0)
2007–2008	Tritium	27	(3)
2008–2009	Ivrea	30	(0)
2009–2012	Tritium	89	(13)
2012–2013	Sambonifacese	21	(0)
2013	Verbania	2	(2)
2013–2014	Olginatese	20	(0)
Total		425	(27)

Managerial career
- 2014: Olginatese
- 2015–2017: Borgosesia
- 2017–2018: Fiorenzuola
- 2018–2019: Imolese
- 2019–2020: Venezia
- 2020–2021: Empoli
- 2021–2024: Sassuolo
- 2024–2025: Palermo
- 2025–2026: Empoli
- 2026: Watford
- * Club domestic league appearances and goals

Alessio Dionisi (born 1 April 1980) is an Italian professional football coach and former player who was most recently the head coach of EFL Championship club Watford.

== Playing career ==
A centre back with free kick abilities, Dionisi spent most of his career at Serie C2 and Serie D levels, with his highlight being at Tritium, a club he captained and with whom he won promotion to Lega Pro Prima Divisione and also played in the Italian third tier for a season.

== Coaching career ==
=== Early years ===
Dionisi retired from active playing football in 2014, immediately being named head coach of Serie D club Olginatese, which was his final club as a player. He then managed again at the Serie D level with Borgosesia from 2015 to 2017, and Fiorenzuola in the 2017–18 season.

He was then named head coach of Serie D club Imolese in 2018, guiding the club to second place in the league. After the club was admitted to Serie C to fill a vacancy, he was confirmed at Imolese and successfully guided the small club from Emilia-Romagna to a historic third place in the league (the best result in the club's history) and a place in the promotion playoffs, where his club was defeated by Piacenza in the semi-finals.

=== Venezia ===
His impressive results with Imolese won him the attention of Venezia, who appointed him head coach on 3 July 2019. With Venezia readmitted to Serie B in place of Palermo, he guided the Venetians to keep their place in the Italian second division.

=== Empoli ===
On 19 August 2020, he was announced as the new head coach of Serie B club Empoli. On his first season in charge, he led Empoli to become 2020–21 Serie B champions and ensured themselves promotion to Serie A.

=== Sassuolo ===
His impressive results at Empoli led to Serie A club Sassuolo offering him the vacant role of head coach after Roberto De Zerbi's departure; after rescinding his contract with Empoli on 15 June 2021, Dionisi signed a two-year deal with Sassuolo the following day, effective from 1 July 2021. After guiding Sassuolo to two consecutive mid-table placements in the Serie A, Dionisi was sacked on 25 February 2024 following a string of negative results that left the Neroverdi struggling in the bottom positions of the league.

=== Palermo ===
On 7 June 2024, Dionisi was unveiled as the new head coach of Serie B promotion hopefuls Palermo. In his season in charge of Palermo, he failed to fulfil expectations, being consistently criticized by the Palermo supporters due to his inability in improving the results of the club despite having the third-highest squad of the league in terms of cumulative wages and high-level signings such as Joel Pohjanpalo. He eventually led the club to eighth place in the league and was eliminated by Juve Stabia in the playoffs. On 15 June 2025, Palermo announced that they had relieved Dionisi of his head coaching duties.

=== Return to Empoli ===
On 16 October 2025, Dionisi agreed to return to Empoli, signing a two-year contract with the Tuscan club. Dionisi was sacked from Empoli on 10 March 2026, after registering only 5 wins in 22 matches.

=== Watford ===
On 15 June 2026, Dionisi was appointed head coach of EFL Championship side Watford on a two-year deal.. Following a 4-0 defeat to Sheffield United, Dionisi departed his role as Head Coach, leaving the club in 21st and 5 points off the bottom 3 as well as 3 wins in 13 matches

== Managerial statistics ==
As of match played 21 November 2026

Managerial record by team and tenure
Team	Nat.	From	To	Record							
Team	Nat.	From	To	G	W	D	L	GF	GA	GD	Win %
Olginatese	(Italy)	27 May 2014	16 October 2014	9	1	3	5	2	9	−7	11.11
Borgosesia	(Italy)	26 May 2015	2 June 2017	76	29	25	22	94	75	+19	38.16
Fiorenzuola	(Italy)	2 June 2017	14 May 2018	43	19	17	7	55	35	+20	44.19
Imolese	(Italy)	31 May 2018	26 June 2019	50	22	18	10	72	51	+21	44.00
Venezia	(Italy)	3 July 2019	14 August 2020	40	13	14	13	40	44	−4	32.50
Empoli	(Italy)	19 August 2020	15 June 2021	42	22	16	4	79	41	+38	52.38
Sassuolo	(Italy)	16 June 2021	25 February 2024	107	32	25	50	153	191	−38	29.91
Palermo	(Italy)	7 June 2024	15 June 2025	41	15	10	16	53	49	+4	36.59
Empoli	(Italy)	16 October 2025	10 March 2026	22	5	7	10	26	29	−3	22.73
Watford	(England)	15 June 2026	22 November 2026	18	5	3	10	15	32	−17	27.78
Total				447	163	138	146	587	550	+37	36.47

== Honours ==
=== Head coach ===
Empoli

- Serie B: 2020–21

=== Individual ===
- Serie A Coach of the Month: September 2023
