= Massimiliano Alvini =

Italian football manager (born 1970)

Personal information
- Date of birth: 20 April 1970 (age 56)
- Place of birth: Fucecchio, Italy
- Position: Defender

Team information
- Current team: Frosinone (head coach)

Senior career*
Years	Team	Apps	(Gls)
1992–1993	Firenze Ovest		
1993–2000	Signa		

Managerial career
- 2001–2003: Signa
- 2003–2004: Quarrata
- 2004–2006: Signa
- 2006–2007: Quarrata
- 2008–2015: Tuttocuoio
- 2015–2016: Pistoiese
- 2016–2018: AlbinoLeffe
- 2019–2021: Reggiana
- 2021–2022: Perugia
- 2022–2023: Cremonese
- 2023: Spezia
- 2024–2025: Cosenza
- 2025: Cosenza
- 2025–: Frosinone
- * Club domestic league appearances and goals

Massimiliano Alvini (born 20 April 1970) is an Italian football coach and former player who is currently head coach of Serie A club Frosinone.

== Playing career ==
As a player, Alvini was a defender who spent his entire short career in the amateur leagues of his native Tuscany, first with Firenze Ovest and then with Signa, before retiring in 2000 due to an injury.

== Coaching career ==
After retirement, Alvini stayed at Signa as a director of football, then as a youth coach, and finally as a head coach. Under his tenure, Signa won promotion to Eccellenza before leaving for Quarrata, guiding them to a spot in the Serie D promotion playoffs and, on a second stint in 2006, promotion to Eccellenza following the club's relegation a year earlier.

In 2009, Alvini was hired as the new head coach of Promozione amateurs Tuttocuoio; under his seven-year tenure in charge of the small Tuscan club, Alvini won an impressive total of four promotions (from Promozione to Lega Pro), as well as a Regional Amateur Coppa Italia in 2009 and the Coppa Italia Dilettanti in 2010, leading to comparisons between him and his personal friend Maurizio Sarri, who also started his career from the regional amateur leagues of Tuscany.

In 2015, he left Tuttocuoio to accept an offer from Lega Pro club Pistoiese, but was sacked on 12 April 2016 due to poor results.

On 11 August 2016, Alvini was appointed as the new head coach of Lega Pro club AlbinoLeffe. After impressive results on his first two seasons and a contract extension in March 2017, he was sacked in November 2018 due to a dismal start in the 2018–19 Serie C campaign.

On 18 June 2019, Alvini signed a one-year contract with Reggiana (still formally called Reggio Audace at that time) as their new head coach following the club's readmission to Serie C. On the club's first Serie C season, Alvini managed to lead them to a promotion playoff spot and eventually winning promotion to Serie B after defeating Bari in the tournament final. For his achievements as Reggiana boss, Alvini was awarded the Panchina d'Oro prize as Serie C's best manager of the season.

Alvini was successively confirmed in charge of Reggiana for the club's 2020–21 Serie B, their first appearance in the Italian second tier in 21 years; he voluntarily left the club by the end of the season after being immediately relegated back to Serie C, despite having been publicly offered to stay in charge of the team.

On 16 June 2021, recently promoted Serie B club Perugia announced Alvini as their new head coach on a two-year deal following the departure of their previous boss Fabio Caserta. Under his guidance, Perugia completed the season in eighth place, qualifying to the promotion playoffs, where they were eliminated in the first round by Brescia after extra time. On 8 June 2022, Perugia announced they had terminated Alvini's contract by mutual consent.

On 9 June 2022, one day after his departure from Perugia, Alvini was unveiled as the new head coach of newly promoted Serie A club Cremonese, with whom he is set to make his debut in the Italian top flight. He was however sacked on 14 January 2023, following a 2–3 home loss to Monza, leaving Cremonese at the bottom of the league table with seven points and no wins in eighteen games in charge of the Grigiorossi.

He successively was hired as the new head coach of Spezia in the Italian Serie B, with the aim of bringing the Ligurians back to the top flight. He was however dismissed on 15 November 2023, leaving Spezia deep in the relegation zone.

On 20 June 2024, Alvini signed a two-year contract as the new head coach of Serie B club Cosenza. He was dismissed on 26 February 2025 following a 0–3 home loss to Palermo, leaving Cosenza at the bottom of the league table. He was reappointed just a month later on 30 March 2025.

After failing to save Cosenza from direct relegation to Serie C, Alvini mutually terminated his contract with the club on 2 July 2025. The same day, he was unveiled as the new head coach of Serie B club Frosinone.

== Honours ==
=== Manager ===
Tuttocuoio

- Promozione: 2008-2009 (Toscana)
- Eccellenza: 2009-2010 (Girone A)
- Coppa Italia Dilettanti: 2010
- Serie D: 2012–13 (Girone D)

Individual

- Panchina d'Oro: 2020
- Serie A Coach of the Month: Aug.–Sep. 2026
