= 2004 Torneo di Viareggio =

2004 Torneo Mondiale di Calcio Coppa Carnevale
56° Torneo di Viareggio

Tournament details
- Host country: Italy
- City: Viareggio
- Dates: February 9, 2004 - February 25, 2004
- Teams: 40

Final positions
- Champions: (Italy) Juventus
- Runners-up: (Italy) Empoli
- Third place: (Italy) Roma
- Fourth place: (Italy) Venezia

Tournament statistics
- Matches played: 76
- Goals scored: 174 (2.29 per match)
- Best player: (Italy) Davide Chiumiento

The 2004 winners of the Torneo di Viareggio (in English, the Viareggio Tournament, officially the Viareggio Cup World Football Tournament Coppa Carnevale), the annual youth football tournament held in Viareggio, Tuscany, are listed below.

== Format ==
The 40 teams are seeded in 10 pools, split up into 5-pool groups. Each team from a pool meets the others in a single tie. The winning club from each pool and three best runners-up from both group A and group B progress to the final knockout stage. All matches in the final rounds are single tie. The Round of 16 envisions penalties and no extra time, while the rest of the final round matches include 30 minutes extra time with Golden goal rule and penalties to be played if the draw between teams still holds. Semifinal losing teams play 3rd-place final with penalties after regular time. The winning sides play the final with extra time, no Golden goal rule and repeat the match if the draw holds.

== Participating teams ==
Italian teams

- (Italy) Atalanta
- (Italy) Bari
- (Italy) Benevento
- (Italy) Catanzaro
- (Italy) Cittadella
- (Italy) Empoli
- (Italy) Fiorentina
- (Italy) Genoa
- (Italy) Gubbio
- (Italy) Inter Milan
- (Italy) Juventus
- (Italy) Lazio
- (Italy) Livorno
- (Italy) Messina
- (Italy) Milan
- (Italy) Modena
- (Italy) Napoli
- (Italy) Parma
- (Italy) Perugia
- (Italy) Reggiana
- (Italy) Roma
- (Italy) Ternana
- (Italy) Torino
- (Italy) Venezia
- (Italy) Vicenza

European teams

- (Germany) Bayern Munich
- (Israel) Maccabi Haifa
- (Serbia) OFK Belgrade
- (Serbia) Partizan
- (Germany) Werder Bremen
- (Serbia) Obilić
- (Czech Republic) Slavia Prague
- (Turkey) Galatasaray

African Team

- Cameroon Douala

American teams

- (United States) New York United
- (Argentina) Arsenal de Sarandí
- Costa Rica United
- (Brazil) Desportiva Capixaba
- (Brazil) Londrina
- (Brazil) Desp. Camboriuense

== Group stage ==
=== Group 1 ===
Team	Pts	Pld	W	D	L	GF	GA	GD
(Italy) Juventus	9	3	3	0	0	5	0	+5
(Italy) Messina	6	3	2	0	1	3	1	+2
(Argentina) Arsenal de Sarandí	3	3	1	0	2	1	3	-2
(Germany) Werder Bremen	0	3	0	0	3	0	5	-5

=== Group 2 ===
Team	Pts	Pld	W	D	L	GF	GA	GD
(Brazil) Londrina	5	3	1	2	0	4	3	+1
(Italy) Parma	5	3	1	2	0	2	1	+1
(Germany) Bayern Munich	4	3	1	1	1	3	2	+1
(Italy) Napoli	1	3	0	1	2	1	4	-3

=== Group 3 ===
Team	Pts	Pld	W	D	L	GF	GA	GD
(Italy) Roma	9	3	3	0	0	8	3	+5
(Italy) Livorno	6	3	2	0	0	4	4	0
(Brazil) Desp. Camboriuense	3	3	1	0	2	4	5	-1
(Turkey) Galatasaray	0	3	0	0	3	2	6	-4

=== Group 4 ===
Team	Pts	Pld	W	D	L	GF	GA	GD
(Italy) Vicenza	7	3	2	1	0	3	1	+2
(Czech Republic) Slavia Prague	6	3	2	0	0	3	2	+1
(Italy) Perugia	4	3	1	1	0	1	1	0
(Italy) Reggiana	0	3	0	0	3	2	5	-3

=== Group 5 ===
Team	Pts	Pld	W	D	L	GF	GA	GD
(Italy) Inter Milan	9	3	3	0	0	11	1	+10
(Italy) Venezia	6	3	2	0	0	11	3	+8
(Italy) Benevento	3	3	1	0	2	3	5	-2
(United States) New York United	0	3	0	0	3	0	16	-16

=== Group 6 ===
Team	Pts	Pld	W	D	L	GF	GA	GD
(Israel) Maccabi Haifa	7	3	2	1	0	8	6	+2
(Italy) Milan	5	3	1	2	0	5	3	+2
(Italy) Lazio	3	3	1	0	2	3	5	-2
(Italy) Catanzaro	1	3	0	1	2	3	5	-2

=== Group 7 ===
Team	Pts	Pld	W	D	L	GF	GA	GD
(Serbia) Partizan	7	3	2	1	0	3	1	+2
(Italy) Torino	6	3	2	0	1	9	5	+4
(Italy) Ternana	4	3	1	1	0	3	3	0
(Italy) Gubbio	0	3	0	0	3	1	7	-6

=== Group 8 ===
Team	Pts	Pld	W	D	L	GF	GA	GD
(Serbia) OFK Belgrade	9	3	3	0	0	5	2	+3
(Italy) Genoa	4	3	1	1	1	6	4	+2
(Italy) Atalanta	4	3	1	1	1	5	4	+1
(Italy) Cittadella	0	3	0	0	3	0	6	-6

=== Group 9 ===
Team	Pts	Pld	W	D	L	GF	GA	GD
(Italy) Fiorentina	7	3	2	1	0	6	0	+6
(Italy) Modena	4	3	1	1	0	2	4	-2
(Brazil) Desportiva Capixaba	3	3	1	0	2	2	4	-2
Cameroon Douala	2	3	0	2	1	1	3	-2

=== Group 10 ===
Team	Pts	Pld	W	D	L	GF	GA	GD
(Italy) Empoli	7	3	2	1	0	5	2	+3
(Serbia) Obilić	6	3	2	0	1	3	2	+1
Costa Rica United	2	3	0	2	1	2	4	-2
(Italy) Bari	1	3	0	1	2	0	2	-2

== Knockout stage ==
Round of 16
18 February
(Italy) Roma	1
(Italy) Milan	0
18 February
(Italy) Inter Milan	5
(Serbia) Obilić	0
18 February
(Italy) Vicenza (pen)	0 (4)
(Serbia) Partizan	0 (1)
18 February
(Italy) Juventus (pen)	0 (4)
(Italy) Torino	0 (3)
18 February
(Italy) Empoli (pen)	0 (5)
(Brazil) Londrina	0 (4)
18 February
(Serbia) OFK Belgrade	0 (4)
(Italy) Messina (pen)	0 (5)
18 February
(Italy) Fiorentina	0
(Italy) Venezia	2
18 February
(Israel) Maccabi Haifa	1 (3)
(Czech Republic) Slavia Prague (pen)	1 (4)

Quarter-finals
19 February
(Italy) Roma	1
(Italy) Inter Milan	0
19 February
(Italy) Vicenza	0
(Italy) Juventus	3
19 February
(Italy) Empoli	1
(Italy) Messina	0
19 February
(Italy) Venezia (g.g. a.e.t.)	2
(Czech Republic) Slavia Prague	1

Semi-finals
21 February
(Italy) Roma	0
(Italy) Juventus	2
21 February
(Italy) Empoli (g.g. a.e.t.)	2
(Italy) Venezia	1

Final
25 February
(Italy) Juventus	3
(Italy) Empoli	0
Third place
23 February
(Italy) Roma	3
(Italy) Venezia	2

== Champions ==
Torneo di Viareggio 2004 Champions

F.C. Juventus
4th time
