= 2003 Torneo di Viareggio =

2003 Torneo Mondiale di Calcio Coppa Carnevale
55° Torneo di Viareggio

Tournament details
- Host country: Italy
- City: Viareggio
- Dates: February 17, 2003 - March 3, 2003
- Teams: 40

Final positions
- Champions: (Italy) Juventus
- Runners-up: (Czech Republic) Slavia Prague
- Third place: (Italy) Cittadella
- Fourth place: (Italy) Vicenza

Tournament statistics
- Matches played: 76
- Goals scored: 208 (2.74 per match)

The 2003 winners of the Torneo di Viareggio (in English, the Viareggio Tournament, officially the Viareggio Cup World Football Tournament Coppa Carnevale), the annual youth football tournament held in Viareggio, Tuscany, are listed below.

== Format ==
The 40 teams are seeded in 10 pools, split up into 5-pool groups. Each team from a pool meets the others in a single tie. The winning club from each pool and three best runners-up from both group A and group B progress to the final knockout stage. All matches in the final rounds are single tie. The Round of 16 envisions penalties and no extra time, while the rest of the final round matches include 30 minutes extra time with Golden goal rule and penalties to be played if the draw between teams still holds. Semifinal losing teams play 3rd-place final with penalties after regular time. The winning sides play the final with extra time, no Golden goal rule and repeat the match if the draw holds.

== Participating teams ==
Italian teams

- (Italy) Ascoli
- (Italy) Bari
- (Italy) Benevento
- (Italy) Brescia
- (Italy) Brindisi
- (Italy) Catania
- (Italy) Cittadella
- (Italy) Cosenza
- (Italy) Empoli
- (Italy) Florentia Viola
- (Italy) Inter Milan
- (Italy) Juventus
- (Italy) Lazio
- (Italy) Messina
- (Italy) Milan
- (Italy) Napoli
- (Italy) Palermo
- (Italy) Parma
- (Italy) Perugia
- (Italy) Reggina
- (Italy) Roma
- (Italy) Salernitana
- (Italy) Ternana
- (Italy) Torino
- (Italy) Vicenza

European teams

- (Germany) Bayern Munich
- (Israel) Maccabi Haifa
- (Serbia) OFK Belgrade
- (Serbia) Obilić
- (Czech Republic) Slavia Prague
- (Switzerland) Grasshoppers

American teams

- (United States) New York United
- (Argentina) Boca Juniors
- Costa Rica United
- (Mexico) Pumas
- (Brazil) Desportiva Capixaba
- (Brazil) Santos
- (Brazil) Marcilio Dias
- (Brazil) Irineu

Oceanian teams

- (Australia) APIA Tigers

== Group stage ==
=== Group 1 ===
Team	Pts	Pld	W	D	L	GF	GA	GD
(Italy) Juventus	7	3	2	1	0	6	2	+4
(Italy) Parma	4	3	1	1	1	6	6	0
(Brazil) Santos	4	3	1	1	1	3	4	-1
(Italy) Florentia Viola	1	3	0	1	2	3	6	-3

=== Group 2 ===
Team	Pts	Pld	W	D	L	GF	GA	GD
(Italy) Cosenza	9	3	3	0	0	4	0	+4
(Italy) Napoli	6	3	2	0	0	6	2	+4
(Italy) Reggina	3	3	1	0	2	1	4	-3
(Australia) APIA Tigers	0	3	0	0	3	0	5	-5

=== Group 3 ===
Team	Pts	Pld	W	D	L	GF	GA	GD
(Italy) Cittadella	5	3	1	2	0	2	0	+2
(Serbia) OFK Belgrade	5	3	1	2	0	5	4	+1
(Italy) Roma	5	3	1	2	0	4	3	+1
(Argentina) Boca Juniors	0	3	0	0	3	5	9	-4

=== Group 4 ===
Team	Pts	Pld	W	D	L	GF	GA	GD
(Italy) Ascoli	6	3	2	0	0	5	2	+3
(Italy) Messina	6	3	2	0	0	6	4	+2
(Brazil) Irineu	6	3	2	0	0	3	3	0
(Italy) Brescia	0	3	0	0	3	1	6	-5

=== Group 5 ===
Team	Pts	Pld	W	D	L	GF	GA	GD
(Israel) Maccabi Haifa	9	3	3	0	0	6	2	+4
(Italy) Inter Milan	6	3	2	0	0	8	2	+6
(Germany) Bayern Munich	3	3	1	0	2	5	10	-5
(Italy) Ternana	0	3	0	0	3	1	6	-5

=== Group 6 ===
Team	Pts	Pld	W	D	L	GF	GA	GD
(Italy) Lazio	7	3	2	1	0	8	2	+6
Costa Rica United	6	3	2	0	0	7	6	+1
(Italy) Milan	3	3	1	0	2	4	8	-4
(Italy) Catania	1	3	0	1	0	2	5	-3

=== Group 7 ===
Team	Pts	Pld	W	D	L	GF	GA	GD
(Czech Republic) Slavia Prague	9	3	3	0	0	12	1	+11
(Italy) Salernitana	6	3	2	0	0	6	5	+1
(Italy) Torino	3	3	1	0	2	2	5	-3
(United States) New York United	0	3	0	0	3	0	9	-9

=== Group 8 ===
Team	Pts	Pld	W	D	L	GF	GA	GD
(Italy) Vicenza	7	3	2	1	0	4	1	+3
(Italy) Benevento	7	3	2	1	0	4	2	+2
(Serbia) Obilić	1	3	0	1	2	1	3	-2
(Brazil) Desportiva Capixaba	1	3	0	1	2	0	3	-3

=== Group 9 ===
Team	Pts	Pld	W	D	L	GF	GA	GD
(Italy) Bari	7	3	2	1	0	6	2	+4
(Switzerland) Grasshoppers	6	3	2	0	0	6	2	+4
(Italy) Brindisi	2	3	0	2	1	2	6	-4
(Brazil) Marcilio Dias	1	3	0	1	2	2	6	-4

=== Group 10 ===
Team	Pts	Pld	W	D	L	GF	GA	GD
(Italy) Empoli	7	3	2	1	0	11	6	+5
(Mexico) Pumas	4	3	1	1	1	4	5	-1
(Italy) Perugia	4	3	1	1	1	5	6	-1
(Italy) Palermo	1	3	0	1	2	4	7	-3

== Knockout stage ==
Round of 16
26 February
(Israel) Maccabi Haifa	2
Costa Rica United	0
26 February
(Italy) Cosenza	0
(Italy) Vicenza	1
26 February
(Italy) Juventus	4
(Italy) Benevento	1
26 February
(Italy) Ascoli (pen)	1 (4)
(Switzerland) Grasshoppers	1 (3)
26 February
(Italy) Lazio	1
(Italy) Cittadella	2
26 February
(Italy) Bari	1 (2)
(Italy) Inter Milan (pen)	1 (4)
26 February
(Czech Republic) Slavia Prague	3
(Italy) Messina	1
26 February
(Italy) Empoli	1
(Italy) Napoli	2

Quarter-finals
27 February
(Israel) Maccabi Haifa	0
(Italy) Vicenza	2
27 February
(Italy) Juventus	2
(Italy) Ascoli	0
27 February
(Italy) Cittadella	1
(Italy) Inter Milan	0
27 February
(Czech Republic) Slavia Prague (pen)	0 (3)
(Italy) Napoli	0 (1)

Semi-finals
1 march
(Italy) Vicenza	0
(Italy) Juventus	4
1 march
(Italy) Cittadella	1
(Czech Republic) Slavia Prague	2

Final
3 march
(Italy) Juventus	1
(Czech Republic) Slavia Prague	0
Third place
3 march
(Italy) Cittadella	1
(Italy) Vicenza	2

== Champions ==
Torneo di Viareggio 2003 Champions

F.C. Juventus
3rd time
