= Gian Piero Gasperini =

Italian football manager (born 1958)

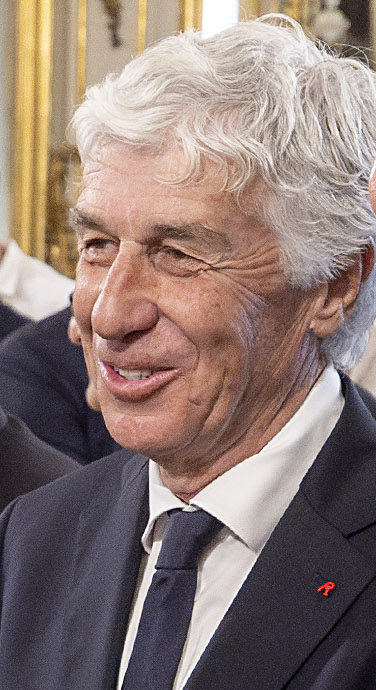
- Gasperini in 2024

Personal information
- Full name: Gian Piero Gasperini
- Date of birth: 26 January 1958 (age 68)
- Place of birth: Grugliasco, Italy
- Height: 1.77 m (5 ft 10 in)
- Position: Midfielder

Team information
- Current team: Roma (head coach)

Youth career
- 1967–1976: Juventus

Senior career*
Years	Team	Apps	(Gls)
1976–1978	Juventus	0	(0)
1977–1978	→ Reggiana (loan)	16	(0)
1978–1983	Palermo	128	(0)
1983–1984	Cavese	34	(0)
1984–1985	Pistoiese	34	(0)
1985–1990	Pescara	160	(0)
1990–1991	Salernitana	35	(1)
1991–1993	Vis Pesaro	61	(0)
Total		468	(1)

Managerial career
- 1994–2003: Juventus (youth)
- 2003–2004: Crotone
- 2005–2006: Crotone
- 2006–2010: Genoa
- 2011: Inter Milan
- 2012–2013: Palermo
- 2013: Palermo
- 2013–2016: Genoa
- 2016–2025: Atalanta
- 2025–: Roma
- * Club domestic league appearances and goals

Gian Piero Gasperini (born 26 January 1958) is an Italian professional football manager and former professional footballer who is currently the head coach of Serie A club Roma.

After starting his managerial career at Crotone, he had spells in charge of Genoa and Inter Milan where he was sacked after just three months. He subsequently managed Palermo and had a second spell at Genoa. Gasperini was then manager of Atalanta for nine years, in which he led the club to five Champions League qualifications and won the Europa League in 2024. He left Atalanta in June 2025 and was appointed as manager of Roma.

== Playing career ==
Gasperini entered the Juventus youth system at the age of 9; during his stay at the youth system, he won an Allievi Nazionali championship and was in the Primavera squad, which included Paolo Rossi and Sergio Brio, that placed runner-up in 1976 behind Lazio. After having played a handful of Coppa Italia matches with the first team, he was loaned to Reggiana and then sold to Serie B club Palermo in 1978. He stayed five seasons at Palermo, all in Serie B, but reached a Coppa Italia final in 1979, then lost to Juventus.

After two seasons with Cavese (Serie B) and Pistoiese (Serie C1), Gasperini moved to Pescara, where he finally gained his first opportunity to play in Serie A after the promotion in 1987. He made his Serie A debut in a home match against Pisa, ended in a 2–1 victory which featured a goal of his. In 1990, he left Pescara to join Salernitana, and retired in 1993 at the age of 35 after two seasons with Vis Pesaro.

== Managerial career ==
=== Juventus (youth team) ===
In 1994, Gasperini returned to Juventus's youth system, this time as a coach. He was initially coach of the Giovanissimi (U-14) for two years, followed by two other years with the Allievi (U-17). In 1998, he became the manager of the Primavera (U-20) squad.

=== Crotone ===
In 2003, Gasperini left Juventus to become head coach of Serie C1 club Crotone, where he readily guided his team to promotion to Serie B via the play-offs. He stayed at Crotone for two more seasons in Serie B; he was sacked during the 2004–2005 season but appointed back soon later.

=== Genoa ===
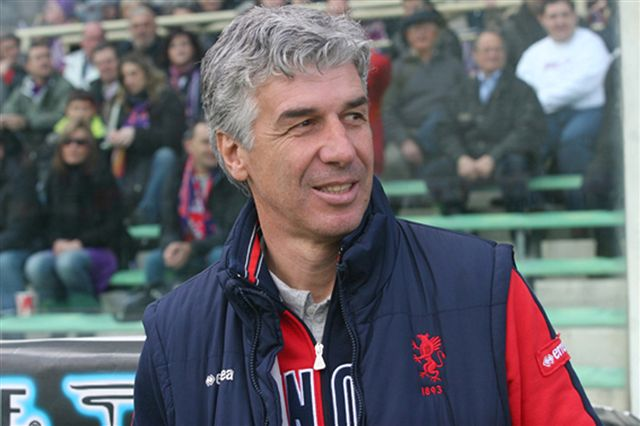
Gasperini with Genoa in 2008

From 2006 he was head coach of ambitious club Genoa, and led his side to a promotion to Serie A in his first season with the rossoblu. In the 2008–09 season, Gasperini led Genoa to fifth place of Serie A, the highest placement for the team in 19 years, thus securing a UEFA Europa League spot, relaunching players like Diego Milito and Thiago Motta in a 3–4–3 formation and a particularly spectacular football style that was praised throughout Italy, so much so that José Mourinho, manager of Serie A champions Inter Milan, stated Gasperini was the coach who put him in greatest difficulty. However, a poor start in the 2010–11 season, with 11 points in 10 games despite popular signings such as Luca Toni, Rafinha, Miguel Veloso and Kakha Kaladze, caused Gasperini's dismissal from his coaching post on 8 November.

=== Inter Milan ===
On 24 June 2011, Massimo Moratti confirmed that Gasperini would replace Leonardo as the manager of Inter Milan. However, on 21 September 2011, Gasperini was sacked after a dismal run of five winless games, including four defeats.

Gasperini began his spell at Inter with a 2–1 loss against crosstown rivals Milan in the 2011 Supercoppa Italiana. In the first Serie A league game, Inter were then surprised by a caretaker-headed Palermo in a 4–3 defeat in Sicily, then followed by a scoreless home draw with Roma.

A 1–0 home defeat to Trabzonspor in the Champions League made matters worse, and Moratti sacked Gasperini after a shock 3–1 defeat to Serie A newcomers Novara.

=== Palermo ===
On 16 September 2012, Gasperini was announced as the new manager of Palermo, a former team of his as a player, taking over from Giuseppe Sannino.

On 4 February 2013, he was dismissed from his post following a 2–1 loss at home to Atalanta.

On 24 February 2013, Gasperini was rehired as the Palermo manager, replacing Alberto Malesani after three games in charge. On 11 March 2013, Gasperini was again removed from the post, this time being replaced by Giuseppe Sannino.

=== Return to Genoa ===
On 29 September 2013, Genoa announced to have rehired Gasperini after almost three years since his previous spell ended.

=== Atalanta ===
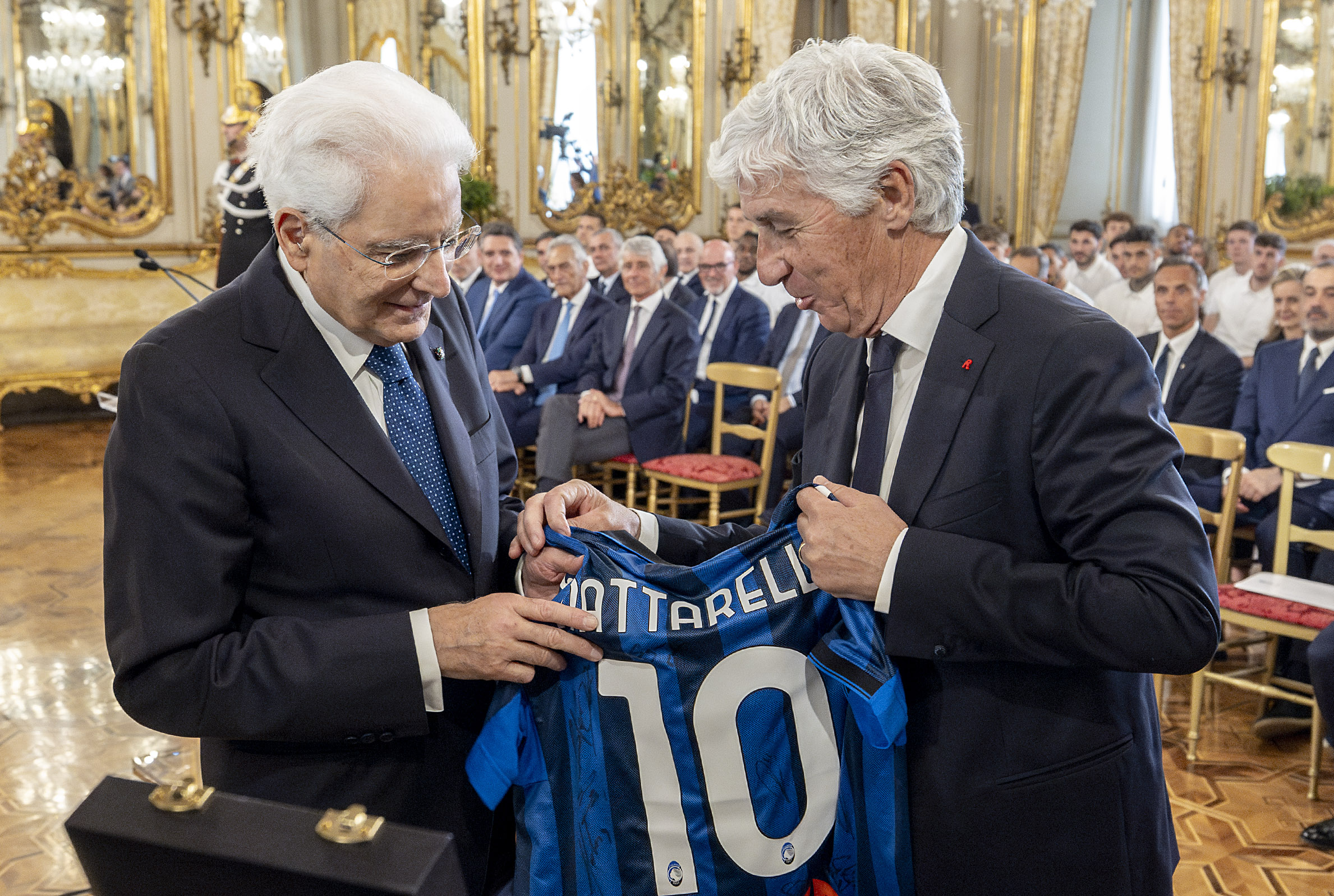
Italian President Sergio Mattarella receiving an Atalanta kit from Gasperini a day prior to the 2024 Coppa Italia final

On 14 June 2016, Gasperini was appointed manager of Atalanta. During his term at the team, Gasperini turned Atalanta from a club with the goal of avoiding Serie B relegation into a team fighting for Serie A dominance and constantly participating in European competitions. His first season in charge turned out to have a difficult start, Gasperini being on the verge of sacking after five rounds which saw Atalanta in the penultimate place after a 0–1 home defeat to Palermo. However, from there on the team's results steadily improved, leading them to beat Inter, Roma and Napoli, with a streak of six consecutive victories in Serie A leaving them in sixth place during the winter break. Atalanta continued to be the season's surprise package and finished fourth in Serie A, thus qualifying for the UEFA Europa League.

The following season, returning to Europe after 26 years of absence, Atalanta managed to win their Europa League group that also included Lyon, Everton and Apollon Limassol, remaining undefeated to progress to the round of 16, where they were eliminated by Borussia Dortmund after a 1–1 home draw and a 2–3 away loss in Germany. In Serie A, they managed a seventh place finish, thus earning another UEFA Europa League qualification, this time in the second qualifying round, while in the Coppa Italia they progressed to the semi-finals, where they were eliminated by Juventus.

On 26 May 2019, Atalanta finished third in Serie A during the 2018–19 season, and qualified for the UEFA Champions League for the first time in their history. Atalanta also reached the final of the 2018–19 Coppa Italia; however they lost 2–0 against Lazio.

On 9 September 2019, Gasperini was made an honorary citizen of Bergamo. Atalanta qualified for the round of 16 of the Champions League for the first time after finishing in second place in the group that also included Manchester City, Shakhtar Donetsk and Dinamo Zagreb. Gasperini's first match in the Champions League knockout rounds ended in a 4–1 home win against Valencia. Atalanta progressed to the quarter-finals following a 4–3 away win over Valencia in the second leg on 10 March 2020, giving them an 8–4 aggregate victory. However, they were eliminated by Paris Saint-Germain in the quarter-finals following a 1–2 defeat. Despite the impact of the COVID-19 pandemic in Italy, which struck Bergamo severely, Atalanta finished in third place in Serie A once again in 2020, qualifying for the Champions League for the second consecutive season. The team's attacking trio of Josip Iličić, Luis Muriel, and Duván Zapata each scored over 15 league goals that season, leading to Atalanta becoming the first Italian club to have three players score at least 15 league goals since Juventus in 1951–52. Atalanta finished the season by scoring a record–breaking 98 goals in Serie A, the most goals by any Italian club in a single league season in over 60 years.

Despite the departure of the club's star playmaker and captain Papu Gómez to Spanish side Sevilla part-way through the 2020–21 season, Gasperini led Atalanta to a third–place finish in Serie A for the third consecutive season in 2020–21, qualifying once again for the Champions League. On 19 May 2021, Atalanta lost 2–1 to Juventus in the 2021 Coppa Italia final, held at the Mapei Stadium – Città del Tricolore, Reggio Emilia. Atalanta suffered a round-of-16 elimination in the 2020–21 UEFA Champions League, losing out to Real Madrid 4–1 on aggregate.

The following season, Atalanta suffered a group stage elimination in the UEFA Champions League, finishing third behind Manchester United and Villarreal, and were demoted to the Europa League; they were eliminated in the latter competition in the quarter-finals, following a 3–1 aggregate defeat to RB Leipzig. The club finished the Serie A season in eighth place, failing to qualify for European club competitions for the first time since Gasperini was appointed the team's manager. Atalanta managed to qualify for the Europa League after finishing in fifth place in Serie A during the 2022–23 season.

On 18 April 2024, Gasperini's Atalanta advanced to the semi-finals of the 2023–24 UEFA Europa League following a 3–1 aggregate win over Liverpool, despite losing 1–0 at home in the second leg. Regarding the result, he commented: "If you don't win without danger, there's no glory to your triumph." He ultimately led the club to victory in the final on 22 May against Bayer Leverkusen; this was Gasperini's first career title and Atalanta's first European trophy.

On 31 May 2025, Gasperini announced his departure from the club after nine years, following a third-place finish in the 2024–25 season and securing qualification for the Champions League.

=== Roma ===
On 6 June 2025, Gasperini was announced as the new head coach of Roma. He signed a contract valid until the end of the 2027–28 season. At Roma, he reunited with Bryan Cristante and Gianluca Mancini, as well as Pierluigi Gollini, all of whom had played for Gasperini during his time with Atalanta. His first competitive game as head coach resulted in a 1–0 win at home against Bologna. He led the club to a third-place finish in his debut season, securing a UEFA Champions League spot for the club for the first time since the 2018–19 season.

== Style of management ==
Tactically, Gasperini is known for using a fluid 3–4–3 formation and a spectacular high-risk hyper-offensive-minded possession-based system, which relies on the versatility of his midfielders and front line. His team's playing style places more focus on scoring goals, off-the-ball movement and quick, short passes on the ground, and less focus on long balls and the defensive aspect of the game. As such, at times his trademark 3–4–3 system resembles a 3–4–1–2, 3–2–4–1, 3–5–2, or 3–4–2–1 formation, with energetic overlapping attacking wing-backs in lieu of wide midfielders, that provide width along the flanks and push up the pitch when going forward. He has also been known to use a 4–3–3 or 4–2–3–1 on occasion. His teams are known for playing a high defensive line and for being very compact defensively, with little distance between the attack and the defence. During the 1990s, Gasperini's tactical philosophy and teams' playing styles was inspired by Dutch football, namely Louis van Gaal's Ajax side, rather than Arrigo Sacchi's 4–4–2 system, which first led him to switch from a four to a three–man back-line. When defending off the ball, his teams are also known for the use of heavy pressing, but also apply elements of fluid man-marking across the entire pitch and often switch to a 5–4–1 formation defensively. This strategy has been described as "man-to-man pressing" in the media. Gasperini favours using hard-working and highly physical two-way players in midfield rather than a deep-lying playmaker, and quick, elusive, even smaller but creative players in attack, in order to implement his system effectively; but also on occasion a larger and more physical centre-forward who is good in the air. Despite the acclaim he has garnered due to his offensive playing style, which has led him to obtain successful results with smaller teams, he has also drawn criticism for his unbalanced approach, and for his team's tendency to concede goals as well as scoring them. As such, certain pundits have questioned whether his system would be equally effective with larger teams.

== Managerial statistics ==
As of match played 21 November 2026

Managerial record by team and tenure
Team	From	To	Record							
Team	From	To	G	W	D	L	GF	GA	GD	Win %
Crotone	1 July 2003	8 December 2004	69	32	17	20	112	76	+36	46.38
Crotone	17 April 2005	10 July 2006	53	24	13	16	73	55	+18	45.28
Genoa	10 July 2006	8 November 2010	186	82	42	62	265	236	+29	44.09
Inter Milan	24 June 2011	21 September 2011	5	0	1	4	5	10	−5	0.00
Palermo	16 September 2012	4 February 2013	21	3	7	11	20	32	−12	14.29
Palermo	24 February 2013	11 March 2013	2	0	1	1	1	2	−1	0.00
Genoa	29 September 2013	14 June 2016	111	40	28	43	145	139	+6	36.04
Atalanta	14 June 2016	1 June 2025	438	228	101	109	852	512	+340	52.05
Roma	6 June 2025	Present	66	39	10	17	126	64	+62	59.09
Total			951	447	221	283	1,597	1,126	+471	47.00

== Honours ==
=== Manager ===
Atalanta

- UEFA Europa League: 2023–24

Individual

- Serie A Coach of the Year: 2019, 2020
- Gazzetta Sports Awards Coach of the Year: 2017
- Panchina d'Oro: 2019, 2020
- Serie A Coach of the Month: November 2021, May 2024, November 2024, October 2025
- Enzo Bearzot Award: 2025
