= 2010 UEFA Champions League final =

Football match in Madrid, Spain

- Match programme cover
- Event: 2009–10 UEFA Champions League
Bayern Munich	Inter Milan
(Germany)	(Italy)
0	2
- Date: 22 May 2010
- Venue: Santiago Bernabéu, Madrid
- UEFA Man of the Match: Diego Milito (Inter Milan)
- Fans' Man of the Match: Wesley Sneijder (Inter Milan)
- Referee: Howard Webb (England)
- Attendance: 73,490
- Weather: Sunny; 25 °C (77 °F); 32% humidity

The 2010 UEFA Champions League final was an association football match played at the Santiago Bernabéu Stadium, home of Real Madrid, on 22 May 2010, to determine the winners of the 2009–10 UEFA Champions League. It was the first Champions League final to be played on a weekend, rather than the traditional Wednesday. The match was won by Inter Milan, who beat Bayern Munich 2–0 to complete the treble, a feat never before achieved by any team from either Italy or Germany. The refereeing team came from England and was led by Howard Webb.

The win gave Inter their third European Cup title, and their first since 1965. That 45 years of await broke the record of the longest gap between two UCL titles, which was held by Real Madrid before, with 32 years (1966-1998). Moreover, it was Inter's first appearance in the final since 1972, and they were the first Italian team to appear in the showpiece match since rivals AC Milan won the competition in 2007. Meanwhile, Bayern had won the competition as recently as 2001—their most recent final appearance—although they were the first German side to reach the final since Bayer Leverkusen in 2002. The 2010 final was the first not to feature an English side since Porto beat Monaco in 2004 with José Mourinho also coaching the winning side, and due to Manchester United being knocked out by Bayern in the quarter-finals on away goals. This was also the first final to include two group runners-up, both Bayern and Inter finished second in group A and F, respectively. The Santiago Bernabéu Stadium had hosted three European Cup finals before; in 1957, 1969 and 1980.

As the winners, Inter played against 2009–10 UEFA Europa League winners Atlético Madrid in the 2010 UEFA Super Cup, and also entered the semi-finals of the 2010 FIFA Club World Cup. The match was Inter's last game under the management of Mourinho as he would move to Real Madrid a few days after the match.

== Background ==
Prior to the 2010 final, Bayern Munich and Inter Milan had met four times in European competition. In those four matches, Bayern held the edge with two wins to Inter's one; the other match finished as a draw. The first meeting between the two sides took place in the third round of the 1988–89 UEFA Cup; Inter won 2–0 the first match at the Olympiastadion in Munich, but Bayern responded with a 3–1 win at the San Siro two weeks later to go through on the away goals rule. They were next drawn together in Group B of the 2006–07 UEFA Champions League, along with Spartak Moscow and Sporting CP. The first match between Bayern and Inter was played at the San Siro, where Bayern won 2–0; the return match finished as a 1–1 draw.

Both teams went into the final chasing the treble, an achievement never before reached by teams from their respective countries; Inter came closest in 1965, when they won the Serie A and the European Cup but lost 1–0 to Juventus in the Coppa Italia final. Bayern Munich claimed their 22nd Bundesliga title on the last day of the season with a 3–1 win away to Hertha BSC on 8 May 2010, before claiming their eighth domestic Double with a 4–0 win over Werder Bremen in the 2010 DFB-Pokal Final on 15 May. Meanwhile, Inter beat Roma 1–0 for their sixth Coppa Italia on 5 May, and then won their fifth Serie A title in a row and their second Double on 16 May with a 1–0 win away to relegated Siena. With both teams having secured domestic Doubles going into the final, it was guaranteed that the Treble would be won for the second year in a row, following Barcelona's success in 2008–09.

The managers of both teams had won the Champions League before: Bayern manager Louis van Gaal won the competition with Ajax in 1995, while Inter's José Mourinho was manager of Porto's 2004 side. The winning manager would therefore become only the third in European Cup history to win as manager of two clubs, following in the footsteps of Ernst Happel (Feyenoord in 1970 and Hamburger SV in 1983) and Ottmar Hitzfeld (Borussia Dortmund in 1997 and Bayern Munich in 2001).

== Venue ==
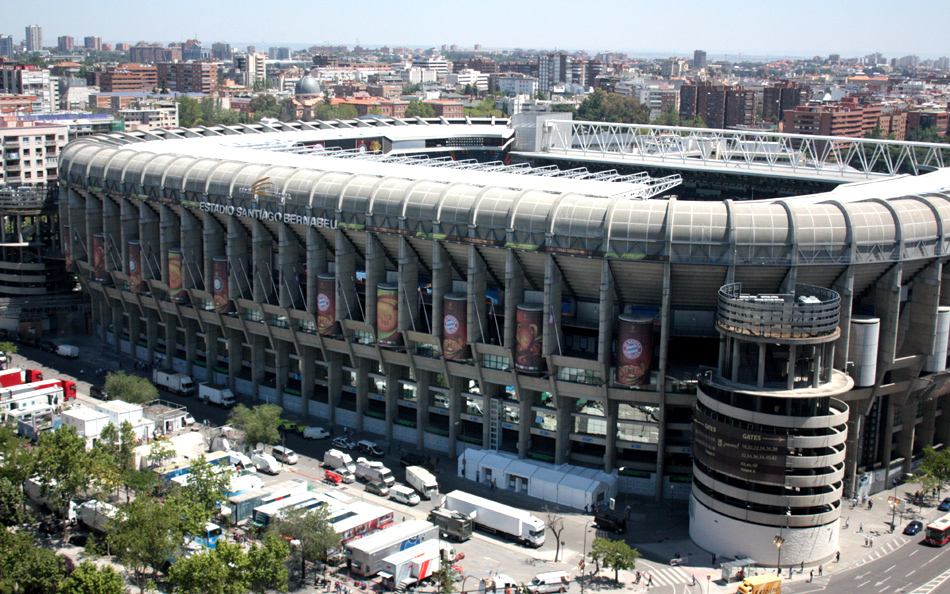
The Santiago Bernabéu Stadium was selected as the venue for the 2010 UEFA Champions League final in March 2008.

The Santiago Bernabéu Stadium in Madrid was selected as the venue for the 2010 UEFA Champions League final at a meeting of the UEFA Executive Committee in Vaduz, Liechtenstein, on 28 March 2008. The committee – who selected the venue for the 2010 UEFA Europa League Final at the same meeting – based their decision on a number of criteria, including stadium capacity, facilities and security. It had been decided that the final would be played on a Saturday for the first time in Champions League history at the UEFA Executive Committee's meeting in Lucerne, Switzerland, on 30 November 2007.

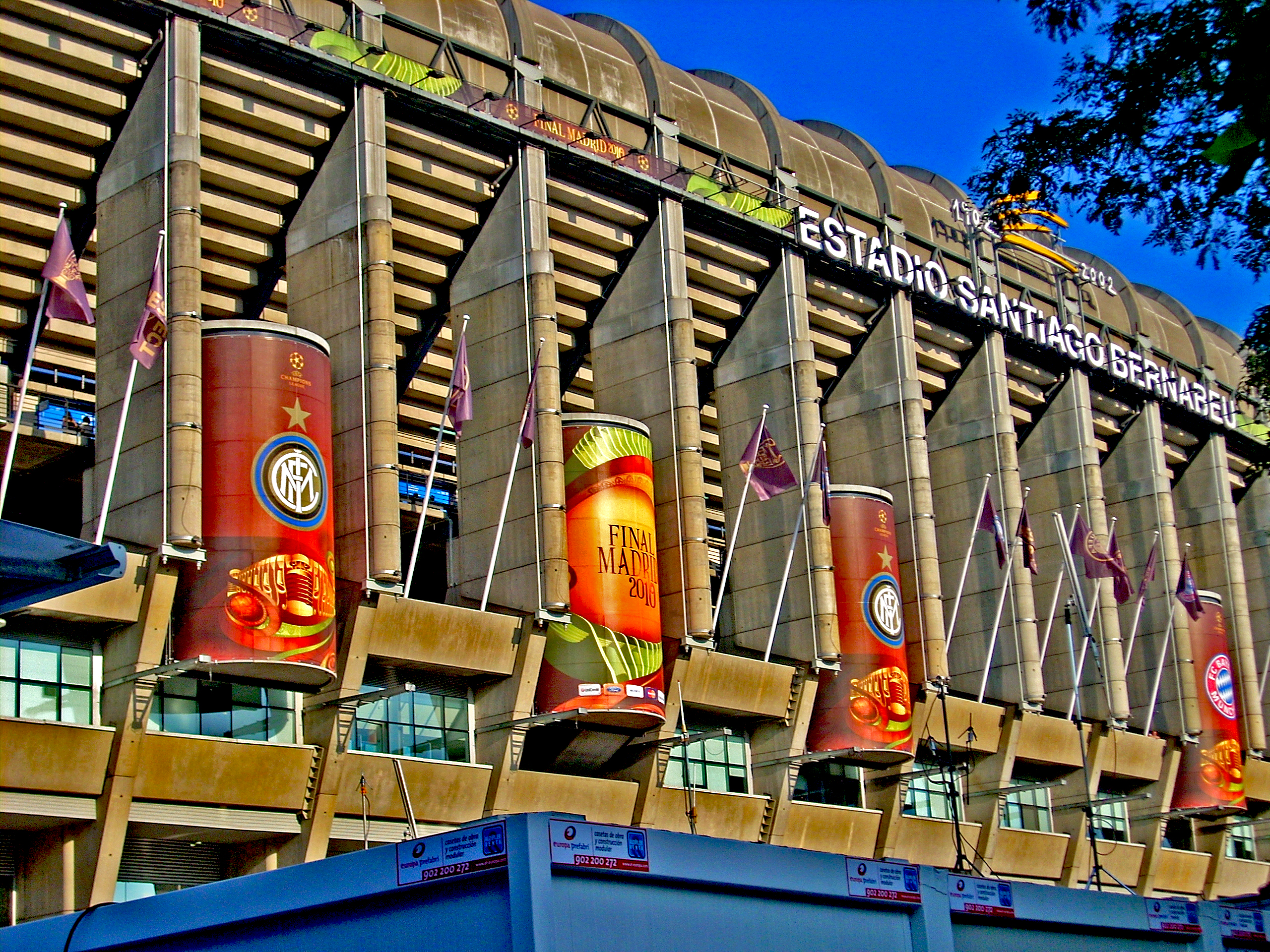
The front side of Bernabéu during the final.

The stadium was opened in 1947 following the election of Santiago Bernabéu as the president of Real Madrid. Upon construction, the stadium had a maximum capacity in excess of 75,000, but this was increased to 125,000 with the addition of a fourth stand in 1954. The stadium was chosen as one of two venues for matches at the 1964 European Nations' Cup, hosting both of the Spain team's matches, including their 2–1 win over the Soviet Union. In preparation for the 1982 FIFA World Cup, FIFA requirements forced renovations to the stadium, adding a canopy to three of the four stands and reducing the capacity to 90,800. The stadium hosted all three Group B matches and the final of the 1982 World Cup. Conversion to an all-seater stadium in 1998 further reduced capacity to just over 75,000, but the most recent expansion in 2006 increased capacity to just over 80,000. Only around 75,000 seats, however, were available for the 2010 final.

The stadium had hosted three European Cup finals: in 1957, 1969 and 1980. Real Madrid themselves won the 1957 final – their second of five consecutive wins – beating Fiorentina 2–0 in front of 120,000 spectators, the second highest attendance in a European Cup final. A.C. Milan won the next final at the stadium, beating Ajax 4–1 in 1969, and Nottingham Forest won 1–0 against Hamburger SV in the most recent final in Madrid in 1980.

== Route to the final ==
Note: In all results below, the score of the finalist is given first (H: home; A: away).

(Germany) Bayern Munich				Round	(Italy) Inter Milan			
Opponent	Result			Group stage	Opponent	Result		
(Israel) Maccabi Haifa	3–0 (A)			Matchday 1	(Spain) Barcelona	0–0 (H)		
(Italy) Juventus	0–0 (H)			Matchday 2	(Russia) Rubin Kazan	1–1 (A)		
(France) Bordeaux	1–2 (A)			Matchday 3	(Ukraine) Dynamo Kyiv	2–2 (H)		
(France) Bordeaux	0–2 (H)			Matchday 4	(Ukraine) Dynamo Kyiv	2–1 (A)		
(Israel) Maccabi Haifa	1–0 (H)			Matchday 5	(Spain) Barcelona	0–2 (A)		
(Italy) Juventus	4–1 (A)			Matchday 6	(Russia) Rubin Kazan	2–0 (H)		
Group A runners-up: Pos / Team / Pld / Pts; 1 / (France) Bordeaux / 6 / 16; 2 / (Germany) Bayern Munich / 6 / 10; 3 / (Italy) Juventus / 6 / 8; 4 / (Israel) Maccabi Haifa / 6 / 0; Source: RSSSF				Final standings	Group F runners-up: Pos / Team / Pld / Pts; 1 / (Spain) Barcelona / 6 / 11; 2 / (Italy) Inter Milan / 6 / 9; 3 / (Russia) Rubin Kazan / 6 / 6; 4 / (Ukraine) Dynamo Kyiv / 6 / 5; Source: RSSSF			
Opponent	Agg.	1st leg	2nd leg	Knockout phase	Opponent	Agg.	1st leg	2nd leg
(Italy) Fiorentina	4–4 (a)	2–1 (H)	2–3 (A)	Round of 16	(England) Chelsea	3–1	2–1 (H)	1–0 (A)
(England) Manchester United	4–4 (a)	2–1 (H)	2–3 (A)	Quarter-finals	(Russia) CSKA Moscow	2–0	1–0 (H)	1–0 (A)
(France) Lyon	4–0	1–0 (H)	3–0 (A)	Semi-finals	(Spain) Barcelona	3–2	3–1 (H)	0–1 (A)

== Pre-match ==
=== Identity ===
The unique visual identity of the 2010 final was revealed at a special ceremony at Madrid's Ciudad del Fútbol Español on 20 November 2009. In attendance at the ceremony were final ambassador Emilio Butragueño, Royal Spanish Football Federation president Ángel María Villar Llona and UEFA's competitions director Giorgio Marchetti. UEFA has given the Champions League final a unique visual identity every year since 1999, in order to give "a distinctive flavour of the host city". The logo features the UEFA Champions League trophy at its core, surrounded by elements of the Champions League "starball" logo, the Santiago Bernabéu Stadium and the Puerta de Alcalá. The logo was designed to capture "the cultural and 'fiesta' aspects which Madrid is famed for".

=== Ticketing ===
Although the usual capacity of the Santiago Bernabéu Stadium was over 80,000, the net capacity for the 2010 Champions League final was around 75,000. The two finalists were each allocated 21,000 tickets, with a further 11,000 tickets being made available to the general public. Applications for those tickets were opened on 8 March 2010 and ran until 19 March; recipients were determined by a random lottery. These figures included a certain number of tickets set aside specifically for children; 2,000 tickets from each club's allocation went to children and their accompanying adults, as did 1,000 tickets from the general public's allocation. Finally, 500 tickets were reserved for children taking part in the activities at the UEFA Champions Festival in the week leading up to the final.

A ticketing launch event was held in Madrid on 5 March 2010, at which the ticketing concept for the final was announced. The event was also used to promote the start of ticket sales for the match, and was attended by the ambassador for the final, Emilio Butragueño, the president of the Community of Madrid, Esperanza Aguirre, and representatives from UEFA, the Royal Spanish Football Federation and the host club, Real Madrid. At the event, Aguirre was presented with the first ticket for the final by Real Madrid players Cristiano Ronaldo and Raúl.

=== Related events ===
A trophy handover ceremony was held at the Palacio de Cibeles in Madrid on 16 April 2010, when Johan Cruyff and Joan Laporta – as representatives of the 2009 champions, Barcelona – returned the UEFA Champions League Trophy to UEFA president Michel Platini. Platini then handed the trophy to Royal Spanish Football Federation president Ángel María Villar Llona and Alberto Ruiz-Gallardón, the mayor of Madrid, so that it might be put on display in the city until the day of the final. Real Madrid president Florentino Pérez, players Raúl, Kaká and Cristiano Ronaldo, and final ambassador Emilio Butragueño were also present at the ceremony.

=== Match ball ===
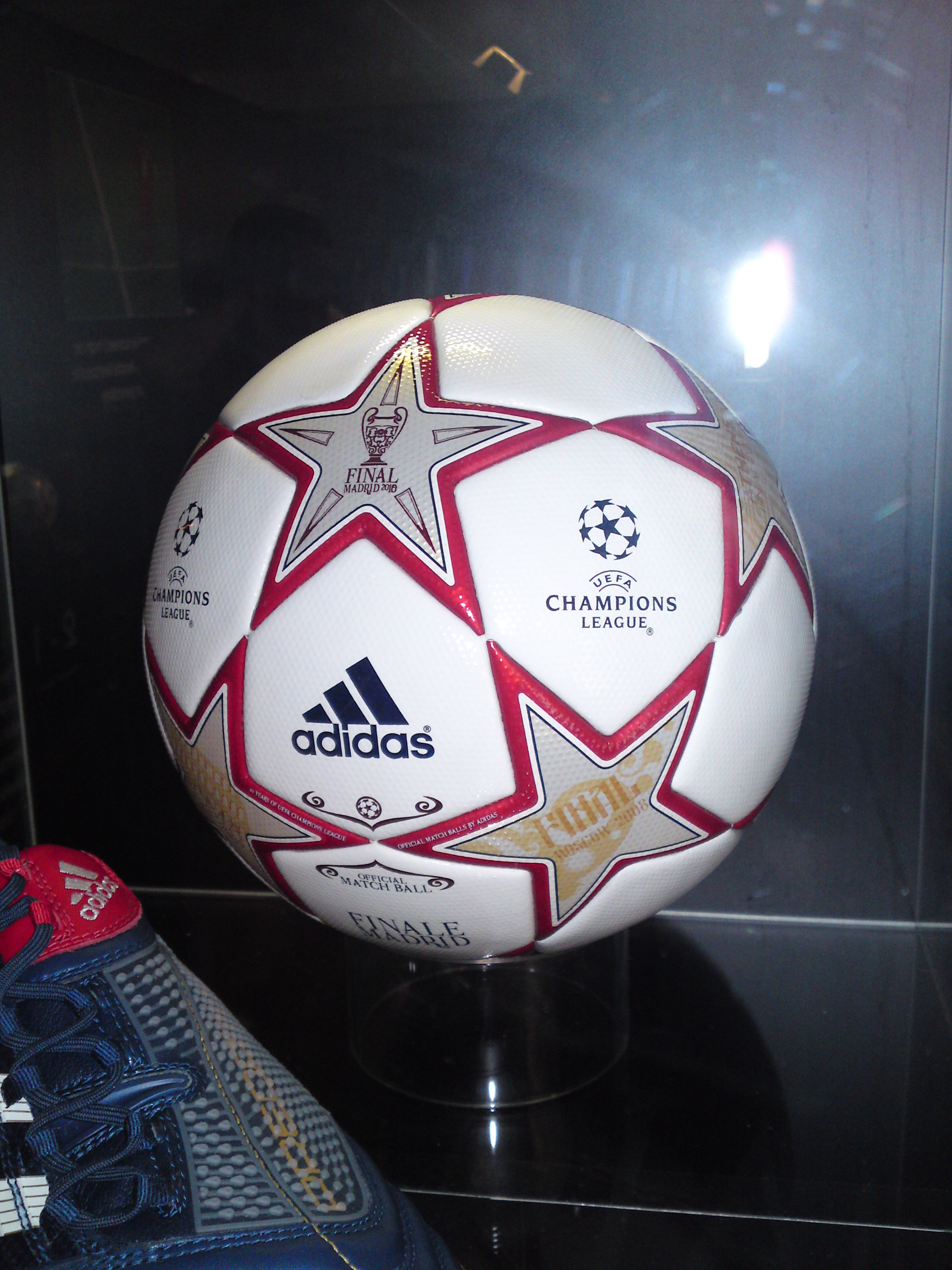
A ball from the final on display at the 2011 UEFA Champions Festival in Hyde Park, London.

The official match ball for the 2010 Champions League final, the Adidas Finale Madrid, was unveiled on 9 March 2010. It was the tenth ball to use the "Starball" design that had become synonymous with the UEFA Champions League. Each of the stars on the ball featured an element of the logos of each of the last 10 Champions League finals, drawn in gold. In reference to the colours of the Spanish flag, each gold star has a red border, while the base colour of the ball referred to the white of Real Madrid's kit. The ball retained the "goosebump" texture of the previous two versions, but the panel configuration was changed for the Finale Madrid, with the panels following the star pattern on the ball.

=== Officials ===
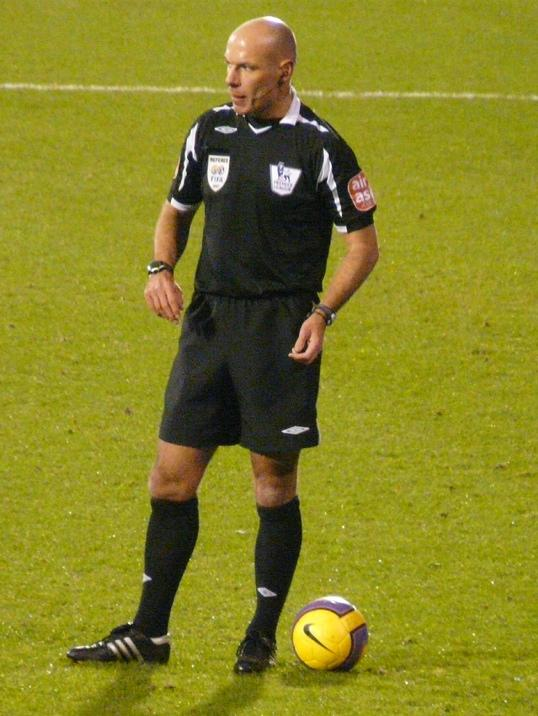
Match referee Howard Webb had been on the list of FIFA-accredited referees since 2005.

The referee for the 2010 UEFA Champions League final was Howard Webb, representing The Football Association of England. Webb became an international referee in 2005, and took charge of his first UEFA Champions League match in the August of that year, when he officiated the match between Haka and Vålerenga in the second qualifying round. His first appointment in the Champions League proper came a year later with the group stage encounter between Steaua București and Lyon on 26 September 2006. Prior to the 2010 final, he had refereed a further 17 Champions League matches and nine UEFA Cup matches. He was also a referee at UEFA Euro 2008, the 2009 FIFA Confederations Cup, and he was selected to be England's representative at the 2010 FIFA World Cup.

As usual, the referee was supported by assistant referees and a fourth official from the same country; in the 2010 final, Howard Webb was assisted by Darren Cann and Mike Mullarkey, with Martin Atkinson as the fourth official.

=== Team selection ===
The Inter team that began the game featured no Italian players in the starting line-up, while Bayern started the game with five Germans, all internationals named in the provisional German squad for the 2010 World Cup. Franck Ribéry was a notable absence for Bayern, serving a three-match suspension after being sent off in the first leg of the semi-final against Lyon for a foul on Lisandro López, while Inter were without midfielder Thiago Motta, who was serving a two-match suspension.

=== Opening ceremony ===
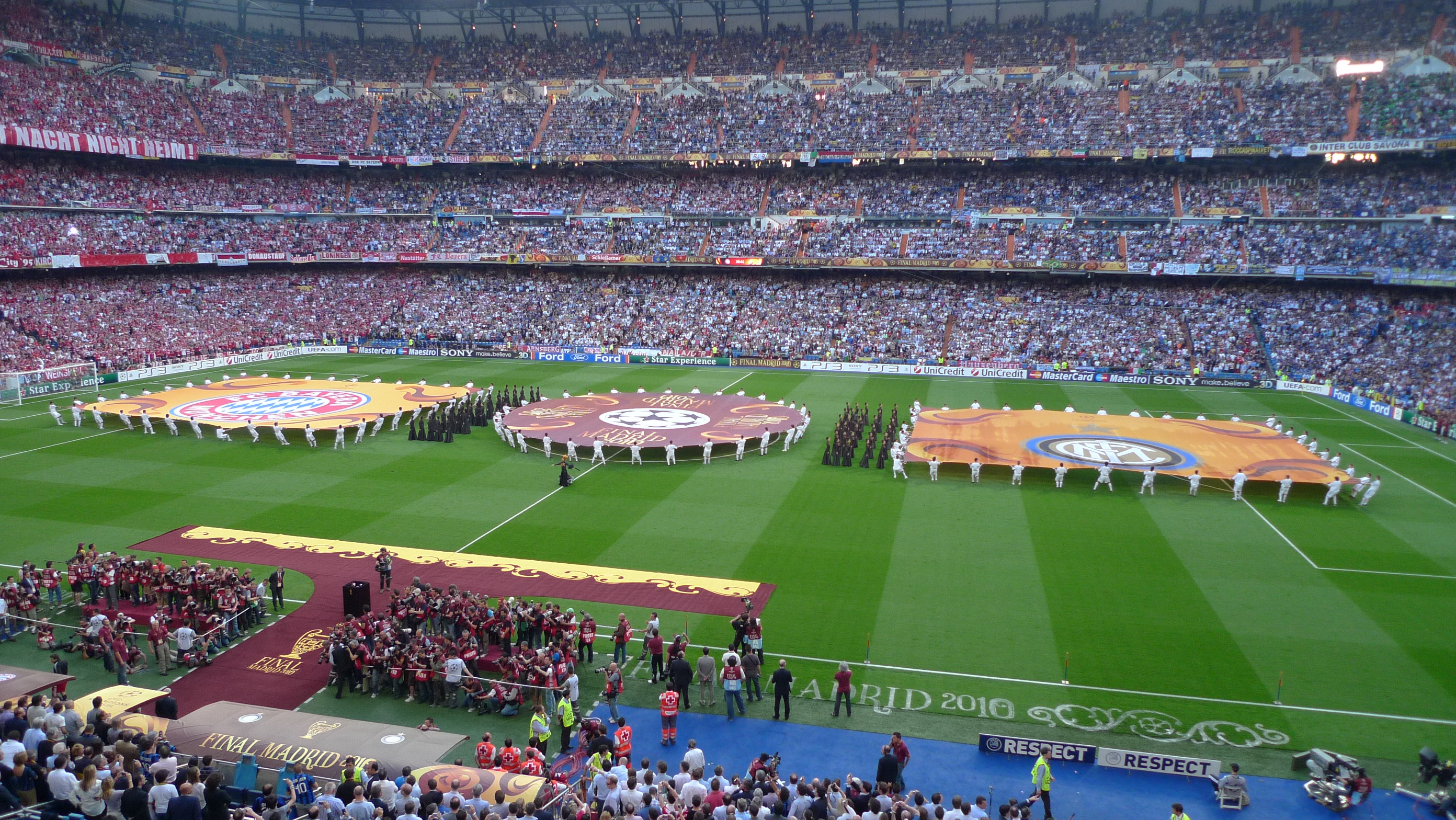
More than 100 people were involved in the opening ceremony.

The 2010 Champions League final officially opened with the UEFA Champions Festival on 15 May 2010. The festival was held at Madrid's Parque del Retiro and ran for the entire week leading up to the final. It featured several events and exhibitions for fans to take part in; as well as being able to play on public-use mini-pitches, fans were able to meet famous faces from European football and explore the history of the Champions League. On the day of the final, the festival culminated with a match between former Spanish players and other European ex-professionals.

The UEFA Champions League Anthem was performed by Peruvian tenor Juan Diego Flórez.

== Match ==
=== Summary ===
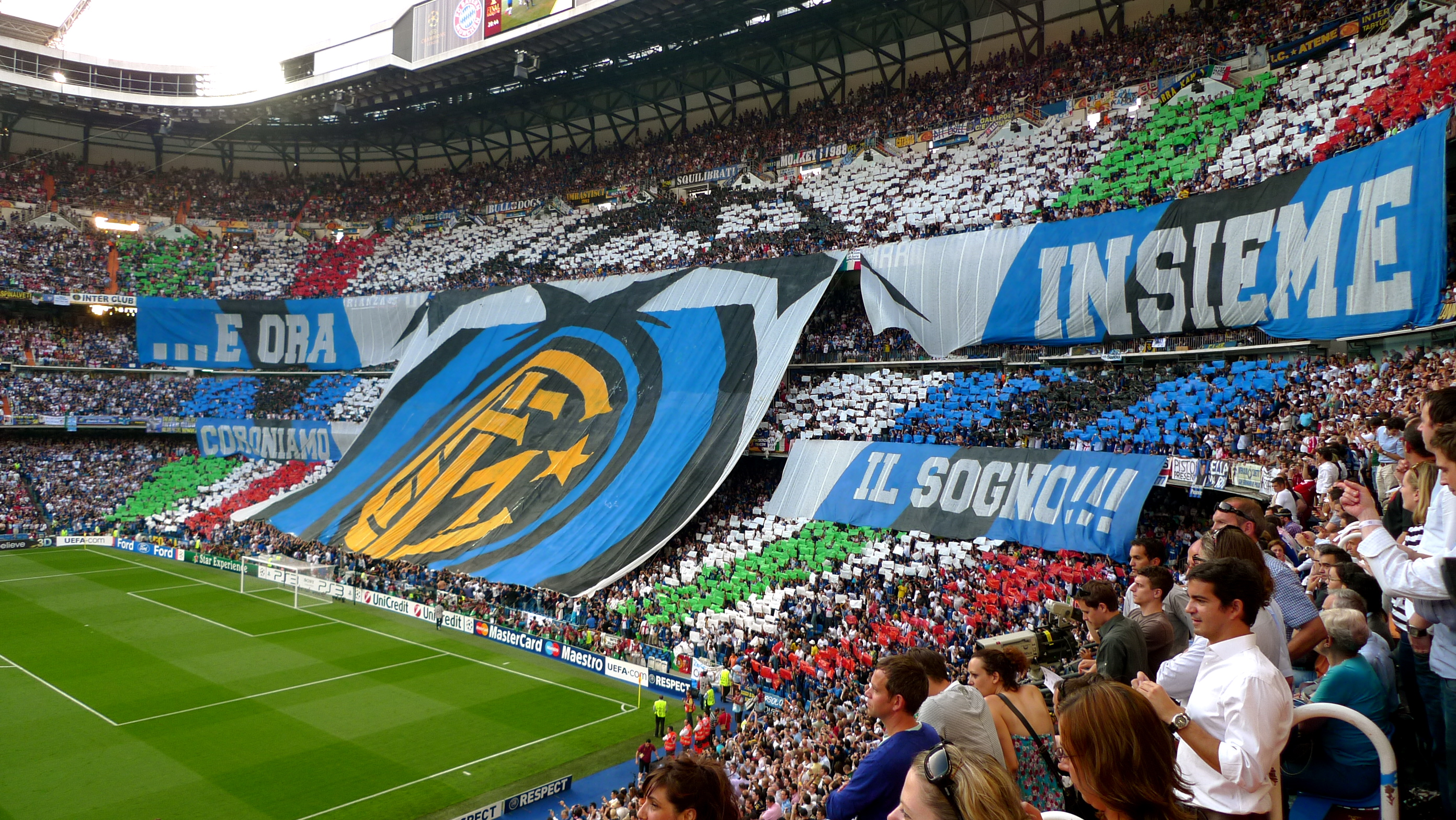
The Inter Milan fans unfurled a huge banner prior to kick-off.

The match was won 2–0 by Inter. Inter employed a counter-attacking strategy that saw them have less possession than Bayern, but Inter were able to comfortably defend their lead. Both goals were scored by Diego Milito, in the 35th and 70th minutes. Milito's first was scored following a long clearance by Inter goalkeeper Júlio César flicked down by Milito to Wesley Sneijder, who returned the pass to Milito to score. Milito's second goal came after he collected a pass from Samuel Eto'o and beat Daniel Van Buyten with the ball. Milito was substituted shortly before the end of the match, allowing him to be applauded by the Inter supporters. After the match, Milito stated the win brought "incredible happiness" and claimed his side deserved its victory. Bayern captain Mark van Bommel conceded Inter was the "most effective team", referring to the success of Inter's counter-attacking tactics. José Mourinho revealed after the match that he would likely resign from Inter to pursue the goal of being the first manager to win the Champions League with three clubs. Reports had linked him with a move to Real Madrid.

=== Details ===
22 May 2010
20:45 UTC+2

Bayern Munich (Germany)	0–2	(Italy) Inter Milan
	Report	Milito 35', 70'

Santiago Bernabéu, Madrid
Attendance: 73,490
Referee: Howard Webb (England)

Bayern Munich	Inter Milan

GK	22	(Germany) Hans-Jörg Butt
RB	21	(Germany) Philipp Lahm
CB	5	(Belgium) Daniel Van Buyten
CB	6	(Argentina) Martín Demichelis	(yellow card) 26'
LB	28	(Germany) Holger Badstuber
CM	17	(Netherlands) Mark van Bommel (c)	(yellow card) 78'
CM	31	(Germany) Bastian Schweinsteiger
RW	10	(Netherlands) Arjen Robben
LW	8	(Turkey) Hamit Altıntop		(substituted off) 63'
CF	25	(Germany) Thomas Müller
CF	11	(Croatia) Ivica Olić		(substituted off) 74'
Substitutes:
GK	1	(Germany) Michael Rensing
DF	13	(Germany) Andreas Görlitz
DF	26	(Germany) Diego Contento
MF	23	(Croatia) Danijel Pranjić
MF	44	(Ukraine) Anatoliy Tymoshchuk
FW	18	(Germany) Miroslav Klose		(substituted on) 63'
FW	33	(Germany) Mario Gómez		(substituted on) 74'
Manager:
(Netherlands) Louis van Gaal

GK	12	(Brazil) Júlio César
RB	13	(Brazil) Maicon
CB	6	(Brazil) Lúcio
CB	25	(Argentina) Walter Samuel
LB	26	(Romania) Cristian Chivu	(yellow card) 30'	(substituted off) 68'
CM	4	(Argentina) Javier Zanetti (c)
CM	19	(Argentina) Esteban Cambiasso
AM	10	(Netherlands) Wesley Sneijder
RF	9	(Cameroon) Samuel Eto'o
CF	22	(Argentina) Diego Milito		(substituted off) 90+2'
LF	27	(North Macedonia) Goran Pandev		(substituted off) 79'
Substitutes:
GK	1	(Italy) Francesco Toldo
DF	2	(Colombia) Iván Córdoba
DF	23	(Italy) Marco Materazzi		(substituted on) 90+2'
MF	5	(Serbia) Dejan Stanković		(substituted on) 68'
MF	11	(Ghana) Sulley Muntari		(substituted on) 79'
MF	17	(Kenya) McDonald Mariga
FW	45	(Italy) Mario Balotelli
Manager:
(Portugal) José Mourinho

UEFA Man of the Match:
Diego Milito (Inter Milan)
Fans' Man of the Match:
Wesley Sneijder (Inter Milan)

Assistant referees:
Mike Mullarkey (England)
Darren Cann (England)
Fourth official:
Martin Atkinson (England)
Reserve assistant referee:
Peter Kirkup (England)

=== Statistics ===
First half
Statistic	Bayern Munich	Inter Milan
Goals scored	0	1
Total shots	10	7
Shots on target	1	4
Saves	3	1
Ball possession	67%	33%
Corner kicks	2	0
Fouls committed	8	6
Offsides	0	0
Yellow cards	1	1
Red cards	0	0

Second half
Statistic	Bayern Munich	Inter Milan
Goals scored	0	1
Total shots	11	4
Shots on target	5	3
Saves	2	5
Ball possession	69%	31%
Corner kicks	4	2
Fouls committed	8	7
Offsides	0	0
Yellow cards	1	0
Red cards	0	0

Overall
Statistic	Bayern Munich	Inter Milan
Goals scored	0	2
Total shots	21	11
Shots on target	6	7
Saves	5	6
Ball possession	68%	32%
Corner kicks	6	2
Fouls committed	16	13
Offsides	0	0
Yellow cards	2	1
Red cards	0	0

== Post-match ==
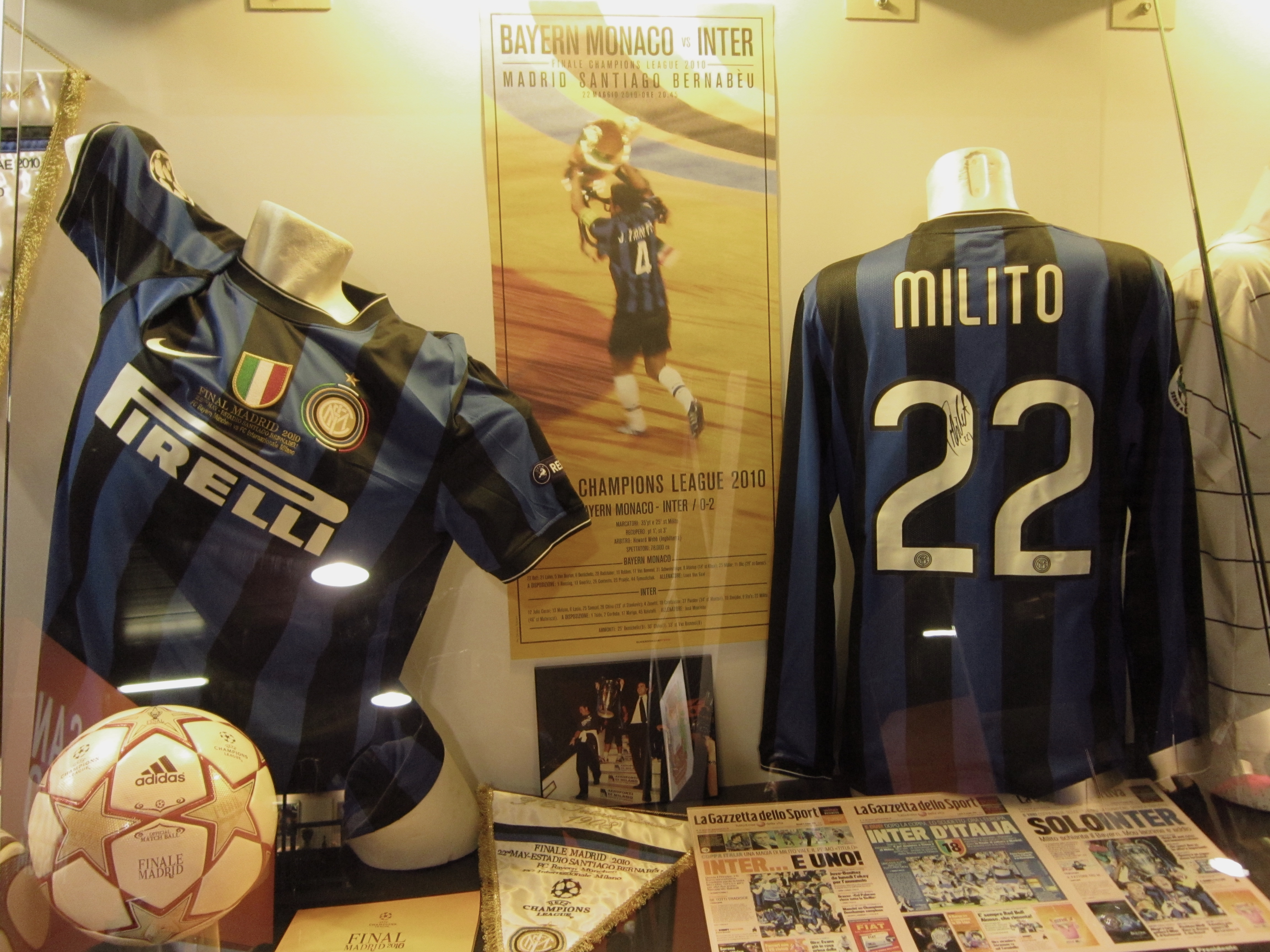
Match winner Diego Milito's jersey and memorabilia from the final displayed at the San Siro museum

As a result of Inter's victory, Italy held onto its position in the top three of the UEFA country coefficient rankings and would therefore retain its fourth berth in the 2010–11 UEFA Champions League. Had Bayern won or the match had gone to penalties, Germany would have overtaken Italy and received an extra entry in the following season. Having beaten Roma in both the 2010 Coppa Italia final and to the 2009–10 Serie A title, Inter became the first ever Italian club to have won the treble. As of the 2024–25 season, Inter would appear in two more Champions League finals, losing both to treble-winning sides in 2023 and 2025. They are still the most recent Italian club to have won the Champions League, and the last to have won a European trophy until Roma won the inaugural UEFA Europa Conference League final in 2022.

Despite winning the treble, Mourinho resigned as manager of Inter on 28 May to take over from Manuel Pellegrini as manager of Real Madrid, citing a desire to become the first manager to win the Champions League with three clubs. However, he was unable to accomplish this feat, being eliminated in three successive semi-finals before returning to his former club Chelsea in June 2013, with Carlo Ancelotti replacing him at Real Madrid; he would gone on to win the elusive Champions League title in his first season there.

Bayern would end their wait for the Champions League title in 2013 and securing their own treble, but not after losing another final, held at their home stadium in the previous year, to Chelsea. As of 2025, they would appear in one more Champions League final post-2013, when they won in 2020 to secure a second treble.

As winners of the Champions League, Inter played in the 2010 UEFA Super Cup against 2009–10 UEFA Europa League winners Atlético Madrid. They lost the match 2–0, with goals from José Antonio Reyes and Sergio Agüero. They also took part in the 2010 FIFA Club World Cup, entering at the semi-finals. There they beat 2010 AFC Champions League winners Seongnam Ilhwa Chunma 3–0 to reach the final against 2010 CAF Champions League winners TP Mazembe, whom they also beat 3–0 to take the title.

== See also ==
- 2009–10 FC Bayern Munich season
- 2009–10 Inter Milan season
- 2010 UEFA Europa League final
- 2010 UEFA Women's Champions League final
- FC Bayern Munich in international football
- Inter Milan in international football
