= 2008–09 Genoa CFC season =

Genoa
2008–09 season
- Chairman: Enrico Preziosi
- Manager: Gian Piero Gasperini
- Serie A: 5th
- Coppa Italia: Round of 16
- Top goalscorer: League: Diego Milito (24); All: Diego Milito (26)

Genoa CFC enjoyed its best season in recent history and finished fifth in Serie A. Topscorer Diego Milito hit the back of the net 24 times, and earned a move to Inter prior to the 2009-10 season. The ex-player and 29-year-old Argentinian Milito, arrived from relegated Spanish side Real Zaragoza, and the returnee performed his best season yet. Thanks to his goals and Thiago Motta's midfield display, Genoa finished in the top 5, and nearly pipped Fiorentina to the final Champions League spot. Motta was also sold to Inter in the summer, which left a huge fold in the Genoa squad.

== Squad ==
=== Goalkeepers ===
- 1 (Italy) Eugenio Lamanna
- 12 (Italy) Alessio Scarpi
- 35 (Brazil) Rubinho

=== Defenders ===
- 2 (Italy) Alessandro Potenza
- 3 (Italy) Domenico Criscito
- 4 (Italy) Matteo Ferrari
- 5 (Greece) Sokratis Papastathopoulos
- 42 (Italy) Giuseppe Biava
- 90 (Italy) Salvatore Bocchetti
- 95 (Italy) Davide Brivio

=== Midfielders ===
- 13 (Argentina) Nicolás Domingo
- 7 (Italy) Marco Rossi
- 17 (Uruguay) Marcel Román
- 27 (Italy) Andrea Gasbarroni
- 30 (Italy) Matteo Paro
- 15 (Italy) Giandomenico Mesto
- 16 (Italy) Francesco Modesto
- 18 (Croatia) Ivan Jurić
- 31 (Italy) Stefano Botta
- 40 (Belgium) Anthony Vanden Borre
- 9 (Italy) Omar Milanetto
- 8 (Brazil) Thiago Motta

=== Attackers ===
- 99 (Italy) Giuseppe Sculli
- 52 (Argentina) Luciano Figueroa
- 24 (Italy) Raffaele Palladino
- 66 (Uruguay) Rubén Olivera
- 92 (Serbia) Boško Janković
- 32 (Italy) Davide Di Gennaro
- 22 (Argentina) Diego Milito
- 92 (Italy) Stephan El Shaarawy

== Serie A ==
Pos	Team	Pld	W	D	L	GF	GA	GD	Pts	Qualification or relegation
3	Milan	38	22	8	8	70	35	+35	74 (Note: Juventus finished ahead of Milan on head-to-head points: Juventus 4–2 Milan, Milan 1–1 Juventus.)	Qualification to Champions League group stage
4	Fiorentina	38	21	5	12	53	38	+15	68 (Note: Fiorentina finished ahead of Genoa on head-to-head points: Fiorentina 1–0 Genoa, Genoa 3–3 Fiorentina.)	Qualification to Champions League play-off round
5	Genoa	38	19	11	8	56	39	+17	68	Qualification to Europa League play-off round (Note: Lazio qualified for the play-off round of the 2009–10 UEFA Europa League by winning the 2008–09 Coppa Italia.)
6	Roma	38	18	9	11	64	61	+3	63	Qualification to Europa League third qualifying round
7	Udinese	38	16	10	12	61	50	+11	58	

Source: lega-calcio.it (in Italian)
Rules for classification: 1) points; 2) head-to-head points; 3) head-to-head goal difference; 4) head-to-head goals scored; 5) goal difference; 6) number of goals scored.

=== Matches ===
- Catania-Genoa 1-0
- 1-0 Giuseppe Mascara (60)
- Genoa-Milan 2-0
- 1-0 Giuseppe Sculli (30)
- 2-0 Diego Milito (90 + 1 pen)
- Palermo-Genoa 2-1
- 1-0 Edinson Cavani (38)
- 2-0 Cesare Bovo (58)
- 2-1 Diego Milito (90)
- Genoa-Roma 3-1
- 1-0 Giuseppe Sculli (4)
- 1-1 Daniele De Rossi (28)
- 2-1 Diego Milito (61)
- 3-1 Diego Milito (87)
- Fiorentina-Genoa 1-0
- 1-0 Alberto Gilardino (61)
- Genoa-Napoli 3-2
- 0-1 Ezequiel Lavezzi (1)
- 1-1 Sokratis Papastathopoulos (44)
- 2-1 Raffaele Palladino (52)
- 3-1 Diego Milito (73)
- 3-2 Germán Denis (75)
- Genoa-Siena 1-0
- 1-0 Giuseppe Biava (20)
- Inter-Genoa 0-0
- Genoa-Cagliari 2-1
- 1-0 Sokratis Papastathopoulos (25)
- 2-0 Thiago Motta (56)
- 2-1 Paolo Bianco (66)
- Udinese-Genoa 2-2
- 1-0 Gaetano D'Agostino (4 pen)
- 1-1 Diego Milito (64 pen)
- 1-2 Giuseppe Sculli (67)
- 2-2 Fabio Quagliarella (78)
- Genoa-Reggina 4-0
- 1-0 Diego Milito (54 pen)
- 2-0 Diego Milito (74)
- 3-0 Giuseppe Sculli (81)
- 4-0 Diego Milito (90)
- Juventus-Genoa 4-1
- 1-0 Zdeněk Grygera (6)
- 2-0 Amauri (26)
- 3-0 Vincenzo Iaquinta (85)
- 3-1 Diego Milito (89 pen)
- 4-1 Sokratis Papastathopoulos (90 + 2 og)
- Lazio-Genoa 1-1
- 0-1 Diego Milito (69)
- 1-1 Ousmane Dabo (80)
- Genoa-Bologna 1-1
- 1-0 Giuseppe Sculli (55)
- 1-1 Marco Di Vaio (63)
- Sampdoria-Genoa 0-1
- 0-1 Diego Milito (50)
- Genoa-Atalanta 1-1
- 0-1 Sergio Floccari (17)
- 1-1 Giuseppe Sculli (86)
- Chievo-Genoa 0-1
- 0-1 Rubén Olivera (89)
- Genoa-Torino 3-0
- 1-0 Giuseppe Biava (18)
- 2-0 Boško Janković (48)
- 3-0 Thiago Motta (84)
- Lecce-Genoa 0-2
- 0-1 Boško Janković (68)
- 0-2 Giuseppe Sculli (90 + 2)
- Genoa-Catania 1-1
- 0-1 Jorge Martínez (67)
- 1-1 Diego Milito (73)
- Milan-Genoa 1-1
- 1-0 David Beckham (33)
- 1-1 Diego Milito (88)
- Genoa-Palermo 1-0
- 1-0 Domenico Criscito (88)
- Roma-Genoa 3-0
- 1-0 Cicinho (26)
- 2-0 Mirko Vučinić (47)
- 3-0 Júlio Baptista (90 + 2)
- Genoa-Fiorentina 3-3
- 1-0 Thiago Motta (12)
- 2-0 Raffaele Palladino (38)
- 3-0 Diego Milito (56 pen)
- 3-1 Adrian Mutu (60 pen)
- 3-2 Adrian Mutu (80)
- 3-3 Adrian Mutu (90 + 4)
- Napoli-Genoa 0-1
- 0-1 Boško Janković (69)
- Siena-Genoa 0-0
- Genoa-Inter 0-2
- 0-1 Zlatan Ibrahimović (2)
- 0-2 Mario Balotelli (61)
- Cagliari-Genoa 0-1
- 0-1 Rubén Olivera (85)
- Genoa-Udinese 2-0
- 1-0 Giuseppe Sculli (59)
- 2-0 Diego Milito (90 + 3)
- Reggina-Genoa 0-1
- 0-1 Thiago Motta (77)
- Genoa-Juventus 3-2
- 1-0 Thiago Motta (29)
- 1-1 Alessandro Del Piero (45 pen)
- 2-1 Thiago Motta (45 + 3)
- 2-2 Vincenzo Iaquinta (84)
- 3-2 Raffaele Palladino (88)
- Genoa-Lazio 0-1
- 0-1 Mauro Zárate (65)
- Bologna-Genoa 2-0
- 1-0 Marco Di Vaio (15 pen)
- 2-0 Claudio Terzi (25)
- Genoa-Sampdoria 3-1
- 1-0 Diego Milito (30)
- 1-1 Hugo Campagnaro (45 + 3)
- 2-1 Diego Milito (73)
- 3-1 Diego Milito (90 + 3)
- Atalanta-Genoa 1-1
- 1-0 Jaime Valdés (9)
- 1-1 Domenico Criscito (90)
- Genoa-Chievo 2-2
- 0-1 Giampiero Pinzi (35)
- 1-1 Diego Milito (58 pen)
- 2-1 Rubén Olivera (71)
- 2-2 Sergio Pellissier (85)
- Torino-Genoa 2-3
- 0-1 Diego Milito (32 pen)
- 1-1 Ivan Franceschini (40)
- 1-2 Rubén Olivera (48)
- 2-2 Rolando Bianchi (49)
- 2-3 Diego Milito (89)
- Genoa-Lecce 4-1
- 1-0 Boško Janković (22)
- 1-1 Simone Tiribocchi (32)
- 2-1 Domenico Criscito (52)
- 3-1 Diego Milito (56)
- 4-1 Diego Milito (67)

=== Topscorers ===
- (Argentina) Diego Milito 24
- (Brazil) Thiago Motta 6
- (Italy) Giuseppe Sculli 5
- (Uruguay) Rubén Olivera 4
- (Italy) Raffaele Palladino 3
