= Diego Milito =

Argentine footballer (born 1979)

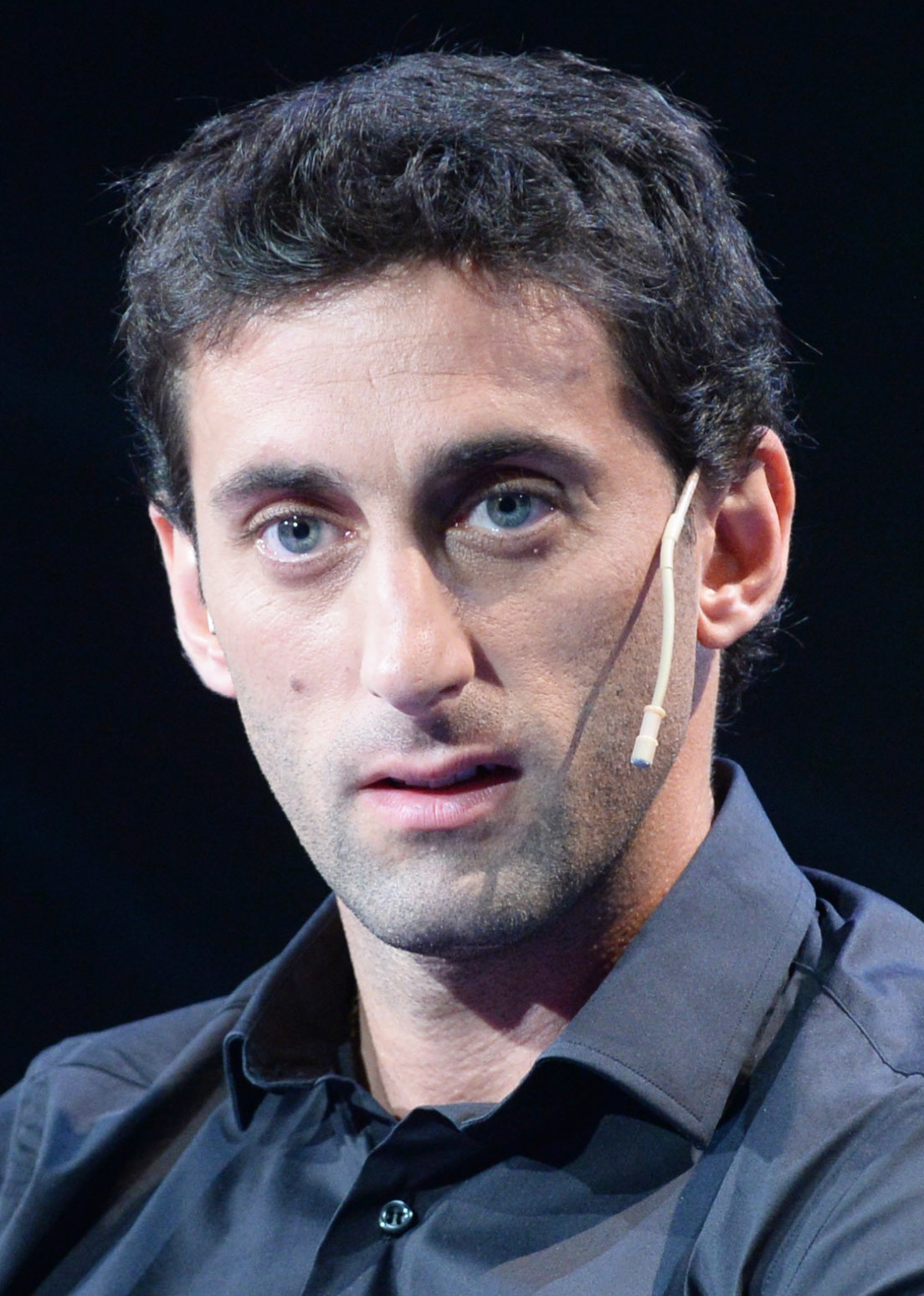
- Milito in 2015

Personal information
- Full name: Diego Alberto Milito
- Date of birth: 12 June 1979 (age 47)
- Place of birth: Bernal, Argentina
- Height: 1.83 m (6 ft 0 in)
- Position: Striker

Youth career
- Racing Club

Senior career*
Years	Team	Apps	(Gls)
1999–2003	Racing Club	137	(34)
2003–2005	Genoa	59	(33)
2005–2008	Zaragoza	108	(53)
2008–2009	Genoa	31	(24)
2009–2014	Inter Milan	128	(62)
2014–2016	Racing Club	52	(18)
Total		516	(224)

International career
2003–2011	Argentina	25	(4)
- * Club domestic league appearances and goals

Diego Alberto Milito (born 12 June 1979) is an Argentine former professional footballer who played as a striker. He was nicknamed El Principe ("The Prince" in English) because of his physical resemblance with former Uruguayan footballer Enzo Francescoli, who had the same nickname.

Milito began his club career in Argentina with Racing Club in 1999, and later moved to Italian side Genoa in 2003. In 2005, he was acquired by Spanish club Real Zaragoza, where he remained for three seasons, before returning to Genoa in 2008. His prolific goalscoring exploits during his second spell at Genoa earned him a move to defending Serie A champions Inter Milan. He was pivotal in Inter's 2009–10 treble-winning season, scoring 30 goals in all competitions, including two in the 2010 UEFA Champions League final. He returned to Racing Club in 2014, where he retired in 2016.

At the international level, Milito earned 25 caps for Argentina, scoring 4 goals, and represented his country in two Copa América tournaments and the 2010 FIFA World Cup.

== Club career ==
=== Racing Club ===
Milito started playing at Argentine first division team Racing Club in 1999, where he won the 2001 Apertura tournament. During this time, his younger brother Gabriel played for Racing's main rival, Independiente, as a defender. The two clubs would contest the Avellaneda derby with the two brothers lining up against each other.

=== Genoa ===
At the beginning of 2004, Milito moved to Italian second division club Genoa for £8 million. After two very successful seasons, where he scored 33 goals in 59 matches in Italy, Genoa were relegated down to Serie C1 as a punishment for an alleged match-fixing case in the final match of the 2004–05 season against Venezia. Due to this, Milito was forced to leave Genoa and would ultimately join his brother Gabriel at Real Zaragoza in the Spanish La Liga.

=== Real Zaragoza ===
Milito scored four goals in the first semi-final of the 2006 Copa del Rey to beat Real Madrid 6–1. He finished the season as Zaragoza's top scorer with 16 goals in the first division.

Milito was one of the top scorers in the 2006–07 La Liga season. He scored 23 goals, two fewer than league top goalscorer Ruud van Nistelrooy and three behind European Golden Boot winner Francesco Totti.

In November 2006, it was reported Zaragoza decided to buy him outright after his two-year loan was set to expire.

Milito became the club captain at Zaragoza, taking over this role from brother Gabriel, who departed for Barcelona in 2007. His contract was extended in August 2007 with a buy-out clause of €100 million. His goals helped Zaragoza to a sixth-place finish in the league. As of January 2008, Milito averaged higher than a goal every two games for Zaragoza, a statistic he also achieved with Genoa. In total, he managed 61 goals during his three seasons with Zaragoza.

=== Return to Genoa ===
On 1 September 2008, just a few minutes before the transfer window closure time, Genoa completed the transfer of Milito from Zaragoza after the Spanish team were relegated to the Segunda División. His agent, Fernando Hidalgo, confirmed Milito chose explicitly to return to Genoa despite having received more lucrative offers from other major European clubs. He made his Serie A debut on 14 September against Milan. Genoa won the game 2–0 with Milito assisting the first goal and scoring the second. On 9 November, Milito scored his first hat-trick for Genoa in the 4–0 victory against Reggina. He finished the season with 24 goals in 31 league appearances, placing him second behind Zlatan Ibrahimović in the Capocannonieri scoring title.

=== Inter Milan ===
==== 2009–10 season ====
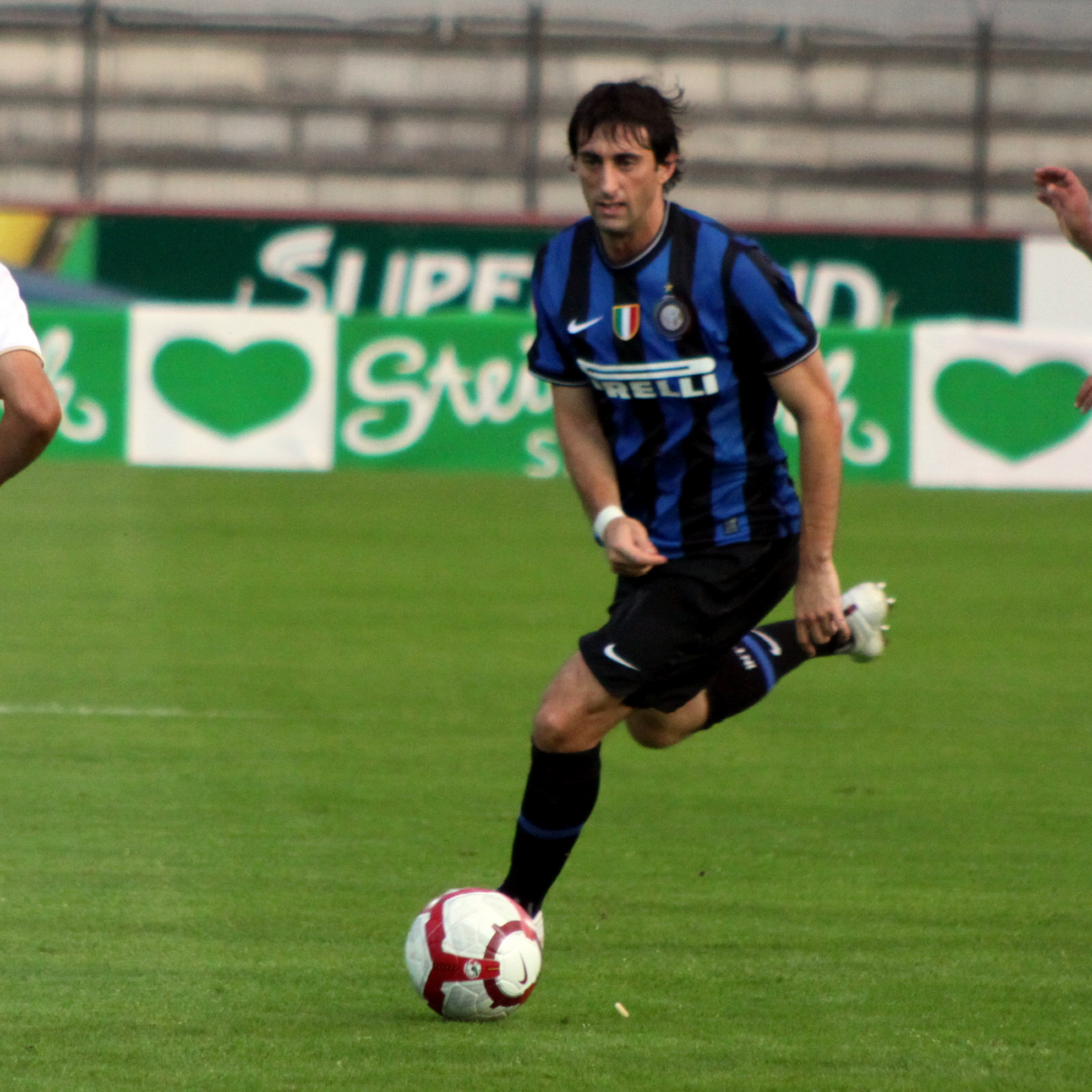
Milito during a pre-season match in 2009 (Inter)

On 20 May 2009, La Gazzetta dello Sport confirmed that Diego Milito was transferred to Inter Milan alongside teammate Thiago Motta. The transfer fees were €28 million and €10 million respectively but Genoa also received Robert Acquafresca, Leonardo Bonucci, Riccardo Meggiorini, Francesco Bolzoni, Ivan Fatić and cash in exchange.

The striker adapted to his new surroundings quickly and had an excellent start to his Inter career, scoring two goals in a 2–0 World Football Challenge win over city rivals Milan. Subsequently, on 29 August, in his first ever Derby della Madonnina against Milan in Serie A, Milito assisted two goals and scored a penalty, his first league goal of the season, as Inter won 4–0. Later, on 13 September, he scored his second league goal in a 2–0 home win against Parma. In the next league match against Cagliari, he scored both goals for Inter in a 2–1 away win. These two goals placed him at the top of the all-time Serie A scoring charts for best strike rate, with 28 goals in 35 games, giving him an average of 0.8 goals per game. Milito continued his fine run of form with another goal in the next league match against Napoli, scoring the second goal after Samuel Eto'o scored in the first minute, a game that they won 3–1.

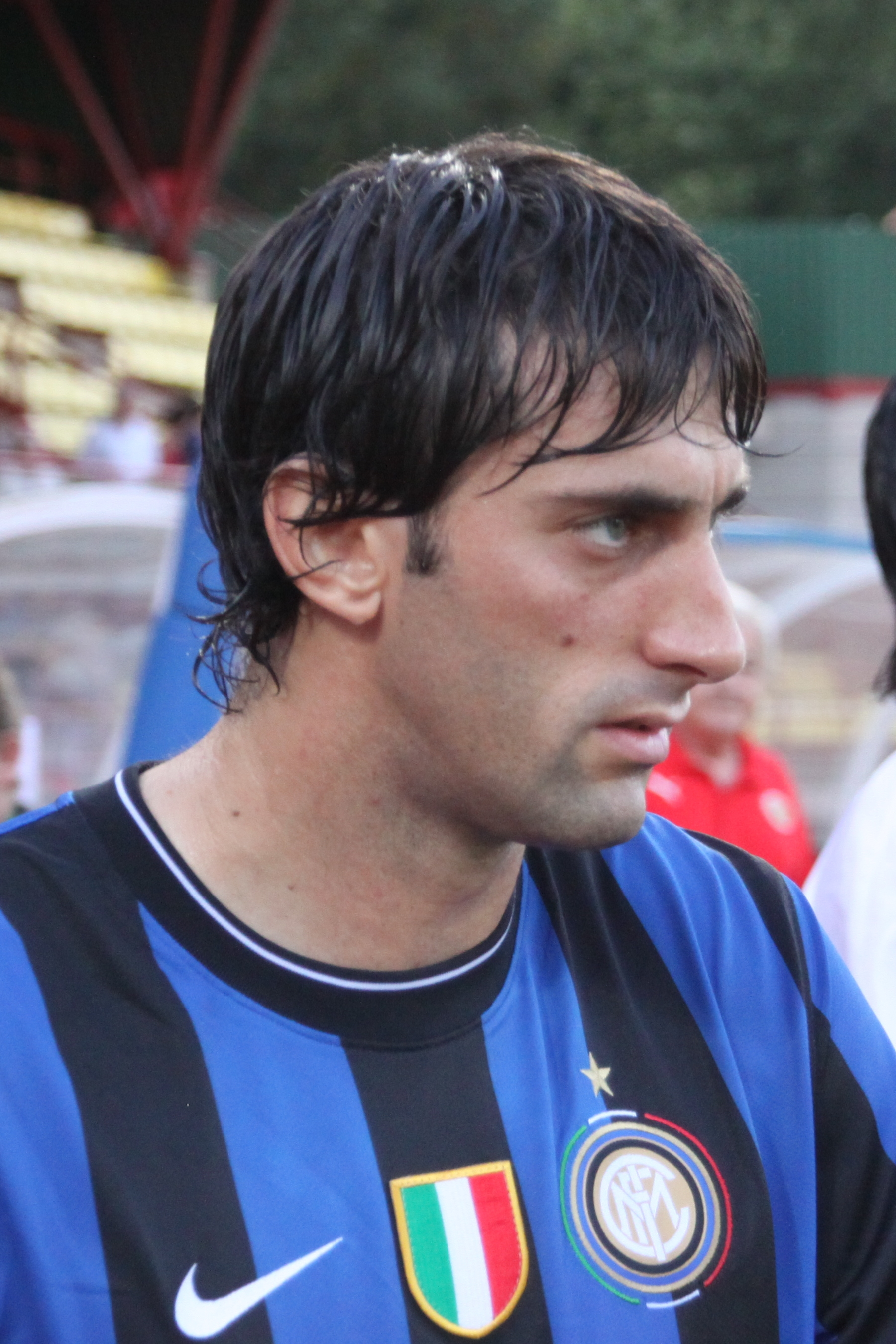
Milito in Inter (2009)

The consistency which Milito had shown at his previous clubs was sustained throughout his debut season at Inter, and after the first few matches, he had established himself as a key contributor to the squad. On 30 October, in a 5–3 home victory against Palermo, Milito, who had returned from an injury, came off the bench to make the result safe, scoring Inter's fifth goal. In the next game, against Livorno, he scored another goal, taking his strike rate up to seven goals in nine league matches. Three days later, on 4 November, he scored his first goal in the UEFA Champions League in a 2–1 Group Stage win over Dynamo Kyiv; it was the equaliser which led to Wesley Sneijder's game-winner in the 89th minute. On 24 February, in another Champions League match, this time in a 2–1 Round of 16 win against Chelsea, he scored another important goal, his second in the competition. Four days later, Milito netted the matchwinner which gave Inter Milan a 3–2 victory at Udinese, in a thrilling win for the Nerazzurri. On 27 March, after missing a 3–0 win over Livorno with a hamstring problem, Milito returned for a crucial battle at title contenders Roma, where he scored one goal in a 2–1 loss. On 31 March, in a 1–0 Champions League quarter-finals win against CSKA Moscow, he scored the winning goal. Milito scored a vital goal and assisted twice in a 3–1 home win against Barcelona in the team's first leg semi-final win.

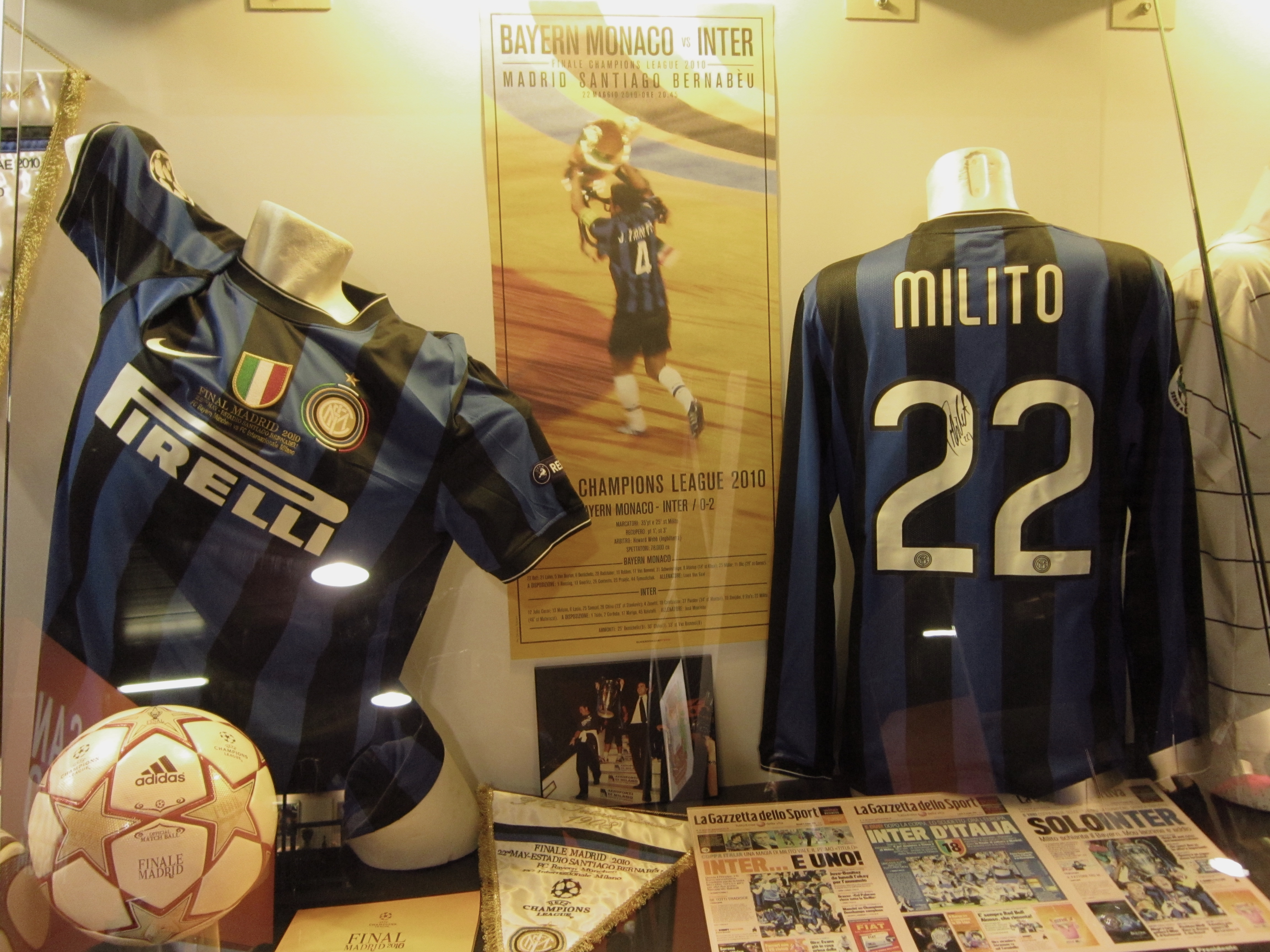
Milito's number 22 Inter Milan shirt from the 2010 UEFA Champions League Final displayed at the San Siro museum

During the last matches of the 2009–10 season, Milito proved instrumental in Inter's winning of the first treble in the history of Italian football. The Argentine first scored the only goal in Inter's victory over Roma in the final of the Coppa Italia on 5 May 2010, enabling the Nerazzurri to take home their first trophy of the season. Eleven days later, it was also Milito's goal which secured Inter Milan's 18th Scudetto when they beat Siena 1–0 on the final matchday of Serie A. With only two points separating the top two teams in Serie A, the goal lifted Inter to the summit of the table after being in a position to lose the league title to Roma at the half-time break as Roma, playing simultaneously, were winning their own match against Chievo at that point. Milito himself declared this goal to be the "best of his career," having been decisive in delivering a league title to his team. On 22 May 2010, Milito yet again proved vital as he scored twice to seal a victory in the Champions League Final over Bayern Munich. As a result, Inter became European club champions for the first time in 45 years with a 2–0 victory and completed their historic treble championship season.

Milito finished the season with 30 goals in all competitions, 22 of which came in the league, 2 in Coppa Italia and 6 in the Champions League. Milito was not included among the nominees for the 2010 Ballon d'Or.

==== 2010–11 season ====
On 9 August 2010, Milito signed a new four-year contract with the Nerazzurri. On 26 August, at the ceremony called for the delivery of the UEFA Club Football Awards, Milito was voted the best player and striker in the previous season's European club by winning the prestigious UEFA Club Footballer of the Year and UEFA Club Forward of the Year. Inter followed the previous season's success with a victory in the Supercoppa Italiana against Roma. He failed to convert a penalty in the 90th minute, however, in the 2010 UEFA Super Cup match against UEFA Europa League champions Atlético Madrid; the game finished 2–0 for the Spaniards. He played his first match of the league on 30 August 2010 in week one against Bologna, where Inter started the season with a goalless draw. On 14 September, Milito scored an accidental own-goal in first match of group stage in Champions League against Twente. Eight days later, on 22 September, Milito scored his first goals of the season in a 4–0 win against nearly promoted club Bari at San Siro, helping the team to reach in top of the league. After that, he went to wait until 10 November to score his next goal, where he scored against Lecce to put his team ahead in 76th minute, but, however, Lecce would equalizing three minutes later with Uruguay international Rubén Olivera. He dedicated the goal to his teammate Walter Samuel, who three days ago ended his season after suffered a severe knee injury.

In December, Milito scored a goal against Seongnam Ilhwa Chunma in the semi-finals of the 2010 FIFA Club World Cup; Inter went on to win the tournament. On 24 January 2011, Milito received an Oscar del Calcio award for "Best Football Foreign Player" and the "Best Footballer of the Year" for the 2009–10 season. Milito registered just eight goals in 34 appearances in an injury-plagued season as Inter finished the league in second place.

==== 2011–12 season ====
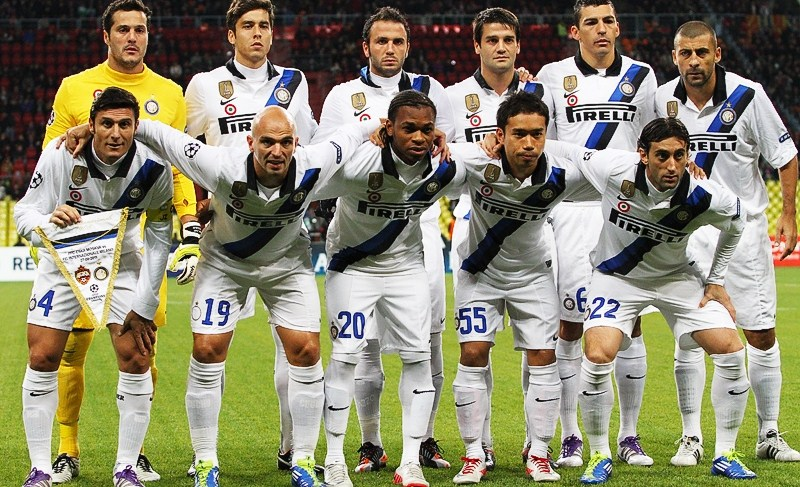
Milito (#22) before a Champions League match against PFC CSKA Moscow in September 2011

In the first Serie A match of the 2011–12 season, Milito scored two goals in a 4–3 defeat against Palermo. After a seesaw performance, Milito crept back on the scoresheet with a goal on 24 September against Bologna and on 2 November, he registered his 200th goal with the club in a Champions League match won 2–1 against Lille.

On 27 November, Milito earned his 400th career appearance in the league match at Siena, which ended with a 1–0 away win for Nerazzurri, while on 18 December, in a 1–0 win over Cesena, he played his 100th game in Serie A. In December, due to his poor performances during the previous season, Milito was awarded the Bidone d'oro, a satirical prize which is given to the worst Serie A player during a particular season. On 21 December, he scored in a 4–1 win against Lecce in Inter's last match of 2011. On 7 January 2012, he scored twice and assisted goal of Giampaolo Pazzini in a 5–0 win against Parma at San Siro. On 15 January 2012, Inter won the Derby della Madonnina against Milan with the result 1–0, with Milito who scored the only goal in 54th minute after an assist from Javier Zanetti, his 200th for an Italian club across all competitive competitions. With his goal at Milan, he has scored seven goals in just nine derby matches played in Italy – four goals in four games in the Derby della Lanterna for Genoa against Sampdoria and three in five in the Derby della Madonnina.

On 1 February, Milito scored all four Inter goals in a 4–4 draw at the San Siro against Palermo, the first four-goal game in the Serie A since Christian Vieri accomplished the feat for Inter against Brescia (4–0) on 1 December 2002. It was also his second four-goal game, the first accomplished with Real Zaragoza in a Copa del Rey match against Real Madrid on 8 February 2006. Milito scored a hat-trick on 1 April in a 5–4 win against his old club Genoa and added another hat-trick on 6 May in the Derby della Madonnina against Milan, where Inter won 4–2. With this feat, Milito overpassed Ronaldo's 49 goals in the all-time list of goals scored in an Inter shirt, with 50. It was also the fourth hat-trick scored in a Milan derby, after Altafini on 27 March 1960; Amadei on 6 November 1949; and Nyers on 1 November 1953. On 13 May, after the club's 3–1 loss against Lazio, Milito finished the season with 24 goals, four behind leader Zlatan Ibrahimović.

==== 2012–13 season ====
Milito started the 2012–13 season scoring the second goal of a 0–3 final victory over Serie A newcomers Pescara in the first game of the season. On 28 October, he celebrated his 100th Serie A match in an Inter shirt, scoring his fourth goal of the season away against Bologna. Three days later, on 31 October, he scored his fifth goal against Sampdoria in a game that ended 3–2 for Inter; it was also his 200th career goal across all competitions. On 4 November, he scored a double in the match against Juventus in Turin, a 3–1 victory, which ended Juventus's 49-match unbeaten run at the Juventus Stadium.

After Inter's 2–1 victory over Napoli on 9 December, where Milito registered a goal, Milito celebrated his 100th Serie win out of 197 games played between both Genoa and the Nerazzurri. With 28 goals scored, Milito also became the player with the most goals scored in the Serie A during the 2012 calendar year, ahead of Napoli's Edinson Cavani (27) and Udinese's Antonio Di Natale (23).

Returning from an injury suffered in January on 10 February 2013, Milito marked his return in the home win against Chievo by scoring a goal and providing an assist on Esteban Cambiasso's strike. Milito's season injuries woes continued, however, as on 14 February, in a UEFA Europa League match against CFR Cluj, he was injured in the seventh minute with a collateral ligament injury, anterior cruciate ligament, and capsule in his left knee. Two days later, Milito announced that the surgery to repair the injury was a success, but that the player would not return to the pitch for at least six months, ruling him out of contention for the remainder of the season.

==== 2013–14 season ====
Milito returned to action for Inter, against Sassuolo on 22 September 2013, having been on the bench in the previous match against Juventus. He scored a brace in a 7–0 away win over the Serie A newcomers. However, he was beset by injury yet again, putting him out for a further ten matches. He returned to the team on 6 January 2014 in a 1–0 away loss to Lazio, coming on as a late substitute. In total, Milito scored 75 goals in 171 appearances in all competitions during his five seasons with Inter, 62 of which were scored in Serie A.

=== Return to Racing ===
In 2014, it was confirmed Milito would come back to his first club, Racing Club, where he started his professional career. Milito scored on his Racing return to help the team to a 3–1 win over Defensa y Justicia on the opening weekend of the Argentine championship. On 26 August 2014, he scored a crucial goal with a penalty in the 1–0 victory against Arsenal de Sarandí in week four of Argentine Primera División. On 31 August 2014, Milito scored his third goal for Racing in a 2–1 loss against Independiente; he scored the goal in the 14th minute after an assist by Ricardo Centurión. He provided an assist for Gustavo Bou, who scored the first goal in a 2–1 win over Boca Juniors. He scored his fourth goal of the season in a 4–0 win over Estudiantes on 11 October. Milito continued his fine form, supplying his third assist of the season in a 1–1 draw against Club Olimpo. He assisted Gabriel Hauche in the 41st minute of the match. Milito scored the fifth and sixth of the season on 30 November in a match against Rosario Central, who ended with a 3–0 win away. After this win, Racing got to the top of the league and one match remained for it to be over. He participated on the play where Ricardo Centurión scored the crucial goal against Godoy Cruz. Racing was crowned 2014 Transición champion, meaning that the team qualified in 2015 Copa Libertadores second stage. That was Racing's first title after 13 years; Milito had also been on the side that won the title in 2001, and thus contributed to the club's only titles since 1966. Milito said that winning the league with Racing was a dream come true.

On 21 May, Milito scored the opening goal from a penalty in a 2–0 win over Temperley, on the final match of his career, at the age of 36. In total, he ended his club career with 254 goals in 607 appearances in all competitions.

== International career ==
Milito made his Argentina debut on 31 January 2003 against Honduras, where he also scored his first goal. He scored his second and third goals on 16 July 2003 against Uruguay, but appeared only intermittently during the following years and was omitted from the 2006 World Cup squad. He played for Argentina in the 2007 Copa América tournament, gaining playing time after Hernán Crespo's injury in a Group Stage match against Colombia, where he scored a goal; Argentina progressed to the final, where they were defeated 3–0 by Brazil.

Milito's impressive performances during his time at Genoa led him to be called more often, especially under the reign of manager Diego Maradona, where Milito would often be deployed as a substitute. After his first season with Inter, Maradona included Milito in the Argentina squad for the 2010 FIFA World Cup in South Africa, where he would feature in two games as Argentina were eliminated 4–0 in the quarter-finals by Germany. On 1 June 2011, Milito was included in new Albiceleste manager Sergio Batista's 23-man squad ahead of the 2011 Copa América, along with his brother Gabriel and Inter teammates Javier Zanetti and Esteban Cambiasso. He did not feature in any matches during the competition with Argentina, who were eliminated in the quarter-finals by Uruguay after penalties.

== Retirement ==
After retiring from professional football, Milito's last club, Racing Club, organised a tribute match in his honour on 12 November 2016, featuring many of his former team-mates, as well as friends and family members. At the age of 37, Milito scored two goals during the match, and was given a standing ovation from the Racing fans, who regard Milito as one of the club's most iconic players.

== Style of play ==
A quick, dynamic, and technically gifted forward, with good vision, composure, and an eye for goal, Milito was known for his offensive movements and ability in the air, and was capable of finishing well with his head as well as both feet, despite being naturally right-footed. He was also an accurate penalty taker.

Regarding his elegant yet efficient playing style, and his consistent, prolific goalscoring, Goal.com said of Milito in 2010: "His profession is football and his speciality is goals. He is considered one of the most impressive strikers in world of football today. He doesn't possess the same physical attributes as some of his fellow strikers, but he doesn't need them - he scores goals with ease and has always featured in top teams. Milito is a pure Number 9 and lethal in the penalty area." After the treble success in the 2009–10 season, many pundits took note of the fact that Milito had always been an effective and efficient striker, yet remained one of the most underrated players in world football because of his low-key manner and the fact that he had plied his trade for smaller, less competitive teams prior to joining Inter. Scoring goals on the biggest stages for a marquee team finally earned the striker the recognition merited by his skill and goalscoring record. Of the player and his two Champions League winning goals, The Guardian wrote:

"Vision, timing, flawless technique and sangfroid – these two goals had everything a great striker needs, plus a sense of lyricism in the fluency of his movement. The 30-year-old Milito is hardly a fancy striker, not a Messi taking your breath away with a trick or a Tevez galvanising the stadium with elemental force, but his economy has been just as devastating..."

Milito often struggled with injuries throughout his career.

== Post-playing career ==
=== Sports management ===
After retiring as a professional football player, Diego took over as the sports manager of the club Racing. Under his management, great players were brought in and a good sports project was consolidated in which he won two titles: Superliga 2018/19 and Trofeo de Campeones 2019. He resigned in November 2020, citing differences with the club leadership over its sporting model.

=== President of Racing Club ===
In December 2024, Milito assumed office as president of Racing Club after the Racing Sueña list won the club's elections. Hernán Lacunza and Martín Ferré were appointed as the club's first and second vice-presidents, respectively.

== Personal life ==
Milito has considerable Italian roots; his paternal family emigrated to Argentina from Terranova da Sibari (in province of Cosenza), Calabria. On his mother's side, he also has Spanish roots. Milito is married to Sofía and they have three children. He is the older brother of former football player Gabriel, who he played against in Champions League games during Gabriel's years playing for Barcelona, most notably in semi-finals of 2010, when both Diego and Gabriel were among their respective team's starting line-up. On 21 May 2016, the day of his retirement from professional football, Milito celebrated the birth of his third daughter, Morena. His son Leandro is currently a member of the Racing Club youth system.

== Career statistics ==
=== Club ===
Appearances and goals by club, season and competition
Club	Season	League			National cup (Note: Includes Coppa Italia, Copa del Rey, Copa Argentina)		Continental		Other		Total	
Club	Season	Division	Apps	Goals	Apps	Goals	Apps	Goals	Apps	Goals	Apps	Goals
Racing Club	1999–2000	Argentine Primera División	11	1	–		–		–		11	1
Racing Club	2000–01	Argentine Primera División	35	2	–		–		–		35	2
Racing Club	2001–02	Argentine Primera División	38	9	–		–		–		38	9
Racing Club	2002–03	Argentine Primera División	35	14	–		11 (Note: Eight appearances and two goals in Copa Libertadores, three appearances and one goal in Copa Sudamericana)	3	–		46	17
Racing Club	2003–04	Argentine Primera División	18	8	–		–		–		18	8
Racing Club	Total		137	34	0	0	11	3	–		148	37
Genoa	2003–04	Serie B	20	12	0	0	—		—		20	12
Genoa	2004–05	Serie B	39	21	3	1	—		—		42	22
Genoa	Total		59	33	3	1	—		—		62	34
Real Zaragoza	2005–06	La Liga	36	15	8	6	—		—		44	21
Real Zaragoza	2006–07	La Liga	37	23	3	0	—		—		40	23
Real Zaragoza	2007–08	La Liga	35	15	4	2	2 (Note: Appearances in UEFA Cup)	0	—		41	17
Real Zaragoza	Total		108	53	15	8	2	0	—		125	61
Genoa	2008–09	Serie A	31	24	1	2	—		—		32	26
Inter Milan	2009–10	Serie A	35	22	5	2	11 (Note: Appearances in UEFA Champions League)	6	1 (Note: Appearance in Supercoppa Italiana)	0	52	30
Inter Milan	2010–11	Serie A	23	5	3	1	4	1	4 (Note: Includes appearance in Supercoppa Italiana, appearance in UEFA Super Cup, two appearances and one goal in FIFA Club World Cup)	1	34	8
Inter Milan	2011–12	Serie A	33	24	1	0	7	2	—		41	26
Inter Milan	2012–13	Serie A	20	9	0	0	6 (Note: Appearances in UEFA Europa League)	0	—		26	9
Inter Milan	2013–14	Serie A	17	2	1	0	—		—		18	2
Inter Milan	Total		128	62	10	3	28	9	5	1	171	75
Racing Club	2014	Argentine Primera División	17	6	1	0	—		—		18	6
Racing Club	2015	Argentine Primera División	20	8	4	0	9 (Note: Appearances in Copa Libertadores)	4	2 (Note: Appearances in Liguilla Pre Libertadores)	0	35	12
Racing Club	2016	Argentine Primera División	13	4	0	0	6	0	—		19	4
Racing Club	Total		50	18	5	0	15	4	2	0	72	22
Career total			513	230	34	14	56	16	7	1	610	255

=== International ===
Appearances and goals by national team and year
National team	Year	Apps	Goals
Argentina	2003	5	3
Argentina	2004	2	0
Argentina	2005	0	0
Argentina	2006	0	0
Argentina	2007	6	1
Argentina	2008	2	0
Argentina	2009	5	0
Argentina	2010	4	0
Argentina	2011	1	0
Total		25	4

Scores and results list Italy's goal tally first, score column indicates score after each Milito goal.

List of international goals scored by Diego Milito
No.	Date	Venue	Opponent	Score	Result	Competition
1	31 January 2003	Estadio Olímpico Metropolitano, San Pedro Sula, Honduras	Honduras	1–0	3–1	Friendly
2	16 July 2003	Estadio Ciudad de La Plata, La Plata, Argentina	Uruguay	1–0	2–2	Friendly
3	16 July 2003	Estadio Ciudad de La Plata, La Plata, Argentina	Uruguay	2–0	2–2	Friendly
4	2 July 2007	Estadio José Pachencho Romero, Maracaibo, Venezuela	Colombia	4–2	4–2	2007 Copa América

== Honours ==
Racing Club

- Argentine Primera División: Apertura 2001, 2014 Transición

Real Zaragoza

- Copa del Rey runner-up: 2005–06

Inter Milan

- Serie A: 2009–10
- Coppa Italia: 2009–10, 2010–11
- Supercoppa Italiana: 2010
- UEFA Champions League: 2009–10
- FIFA Club World Cup: 2010

Individual

- Guerin d'Oro: 2008–09
- Serie A Goalscorer of the Year: 2009
- FIFA FIFPro World XI nominee: 2009, 2010
- Serie A Most Loved Player: 2009
- 2010 UEFA Champions League Final: UEFA Man of the Match
- UEFA Club Forward of the Year: 2009–10
- UEFA Club Footballer of the Year: 2009–10
- Serie A Footballer of the Year: 2009–10
- Serie A Foreign Footballer of the Year: 2009–10
- Inter Milan Hall of Fame: 2020
