= Thiago Motta =

Football manager (born 1982)

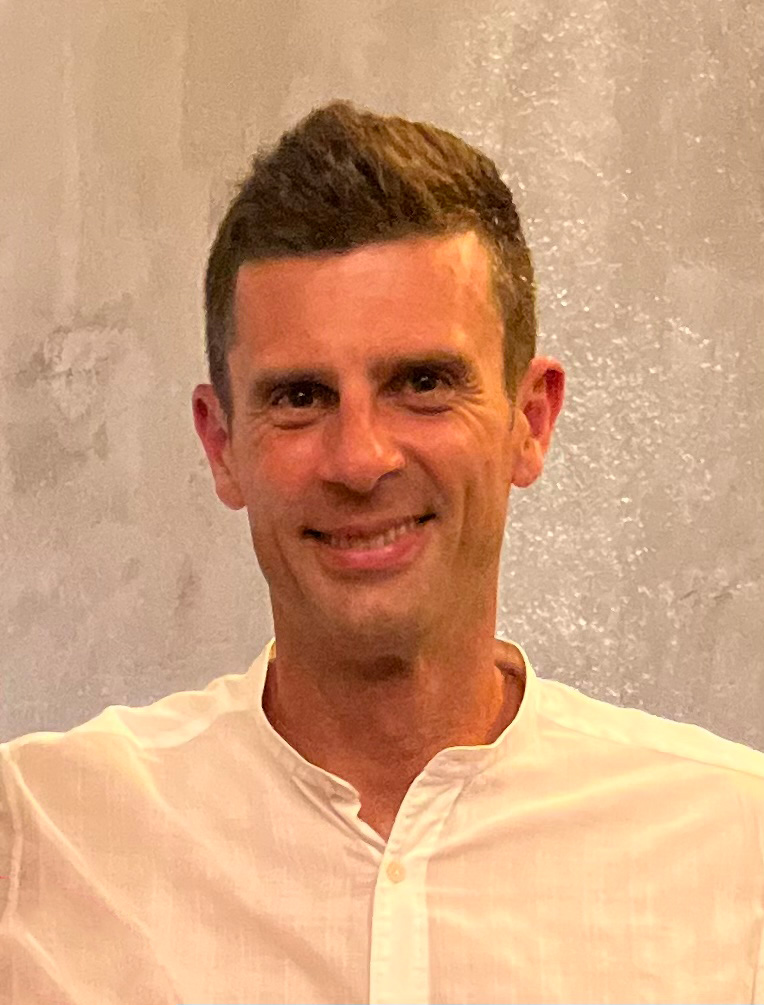
- Motta in 2023

Personal information
- Full name: Thiago Motta
- Date of birth: 28 August 1982 (age 44)
- Place of birth: São Bernardo do Campo, Brazil
- Height: 1.88 m (6 ft 2 in)
- Position: Defensive midfielder

Youth career
- 1997–1999: Juventus-SP

Senior career*
Years	Team	Apps	(Gls)
1999–2002	Barcelona B	84	(12)
2001–2007	Barcelona	96	(6)
2007–2008	Atlético Madrid	6	(0)
2008–2009	Genoa	27	(6)
2009–2012	Inter Milan	55	(11)
2012–2018	Paris Saint-Germain	166	(8)
Total		434	(43)

International career
2003	Brazil	2	(0)
2011–2016	Italy	30	(1)

Managerial career
- 2019: Genoa
- 2021–2022: Spezia
- 2022–2024: Bologna
- 2024–2025: Juventus
Medal record
Men's Football
Representing Brazil
South American U-17 Championship
Winner	1999 Uruguay
CONCACAF Gold Cup
Runner-up	2003 United States–Mexico
Representing Italy
UEFA European Championship
Runner-up	2012 Poland–Ukraine
- * Club domestic league appearances and goals

Thiago Motta (Brazilian Portuguese: [tʃiˈaɡu ˈmɔtɐ]; Italian: [ˈtjaːɡo ˈmɔtta]; born 28 August 1982) is an Italian professional football manager and former player who was most recently the head coach of Serie A club Juventus.

A defensive midfielder, Motta spent his early career in Spain with Barcelona, where he won two La Liga titles and the UEFA Champions League despite recurring injuries. After brief spells with Atlético Madrid and Genoa, Motta was signed by Inter Milan in 2009. He was part of the squad that won a continental treble of Serie A, Coppa Italia and the Champions League in 2010. He joined Paris Saint-Germain in 2012, where he won 18 trophies (including five Ligue 1 titles) before retiring in 2018.

Born and raised in Brazil and of Italian descent, Motta holds Italian citizenship. After making two appearances for Brazil in 2003, he subsequently represented Italy 30 times from 2011, scoring once. He appeared as Italy were finalists at UEFA Euro 2012, and also played at the 2014 FIFA World Cup and Euro 2016.

Following his retirement, he coached PSG's under-19 side. In October 2019, he returned to Genoa as their manager, before being fired in December following a poor run of results. In July 2021, Motta was appointed manager of Spezia, where he remained for one season, before taking over as manager of Bologna in September 2022, leading them to qualify for the Champions League in his second season. In June 2024, Motta was appointed head coach of Juventus. In March 2025, after being eliminated from the Champions League and general poor results, he was sacked.

== Early life ==
Motta was born in São Bernardo do Campo, São Paulo, and is of Italian descent.

== Club career ==
=== Barcelona ===
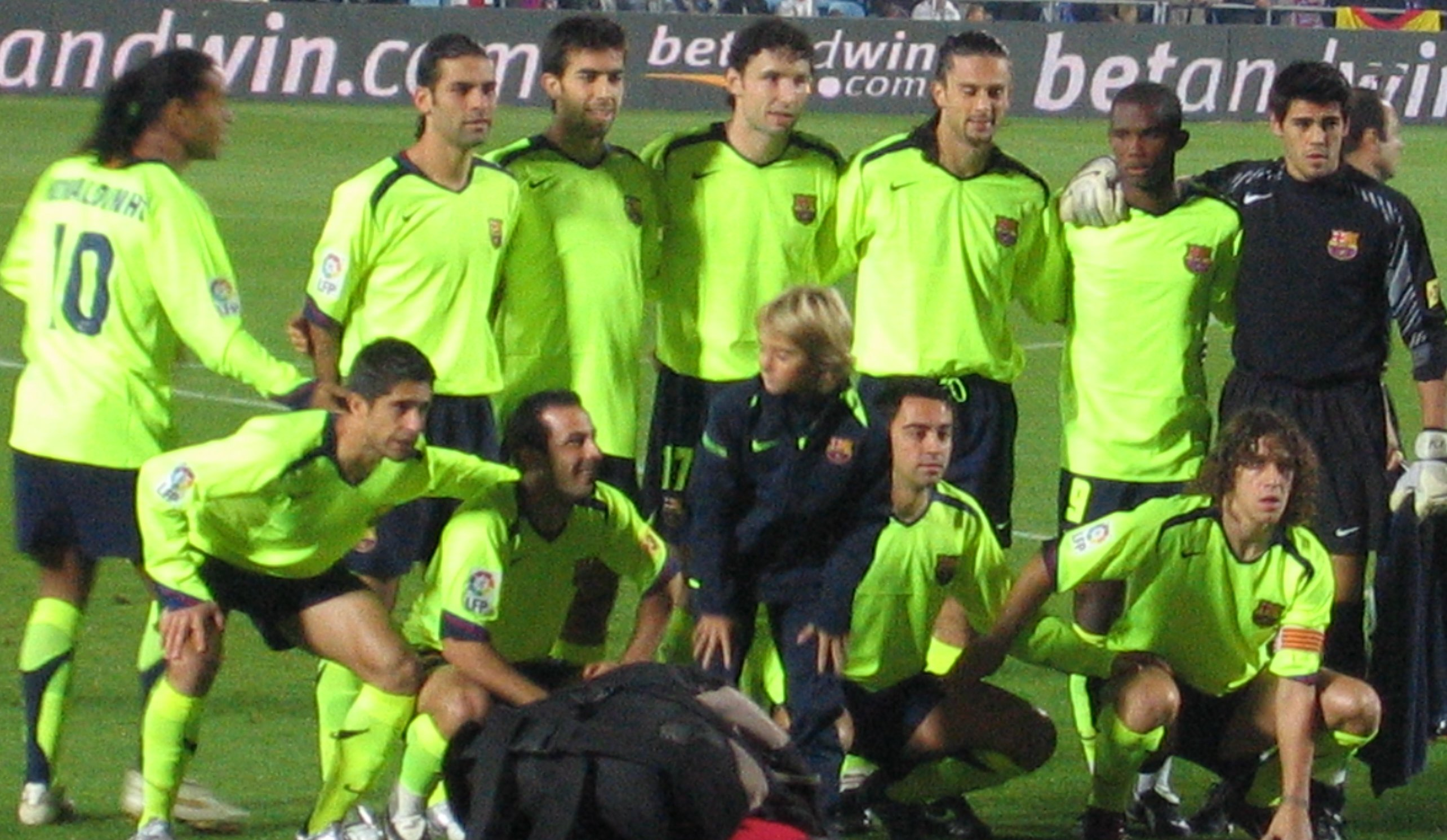
Motta (back row, third from right) lining up for Barcelona during the 2005–06 season

Motta signed with Barcelona in 1999 at age 17 from São Paulo side Juventus-SP, initially being assigned to the club's B-side. He eventually graduated to the first team in 2001, making his debut on 3 October against Mallorca in a 3–0 home win.

In the 2001–02 edition of the UEFA Champions League, Motta made seven appearances and helped his team to the semi-finals. In 2002–03's La Liga he appeared in a career-best 21 games (with three goals) as Barça could only finish in sixth position, and also played an important part in the following season's long UEFA Cup run, which was eventually ended by Celtic. In the first leg, a 0–1 loss in Glasgow (0–1 on aggregate), he was sent off during half-time after hitting out at opposing goalkeeper Robert Douglas who was also shown the red card, in an incident that happened in the tunnel.

Motta was also dogged by several injuries, particularly one suffered on 11 September 2004 against Sevilla, which sidelined him for seven months, during his time at Barcelona. He eventually needed surgery to rebuild the anterior cruciate and lateral ligaments in his left knee, but was able to make a swift recovery and made an emotional comeback, taking to the field to rapturous applause as the eventual league champions defeated Getafe 2–0 on 17 April.

=== Atlético Madrid ===
In late August 2007, Motta signed a one-year contract with Atlético Madrid for an undisclosed fee. Once again he began the season on the sidelines, injured; in the Copa del Rey quarter-final match against Valencia, he was ejected after only 25 minutes, and the Colchoneros lost the away fixture 0–1 and subsequently the tie.

Due to injury to regular starter Raúl García and the departure of Maniche in January 2008, Motta's opportunities increased. In March, however, the recurrent knee problems reappeared and his season was over, followed by a successful surgery and rehabilitation in the United States; he trialled with Premier League side Portsmouth after his release, but did not sign for them.

=== Genoa ===
In September 2008, Motta joined Genoa on a free transfer, after passing a medical. During his debut campaign he performed consistently well and was a regular in the starting eleven, under coach Gian Piero Gasperini.

On 11 April 2009, Motta scored two goals (one of them in the first half's injury time) in a final 3–2 home victory over Juventus. He finished the year with a career-best six goals, and his team qualified for the Europa League.

=== Inter Milan ===
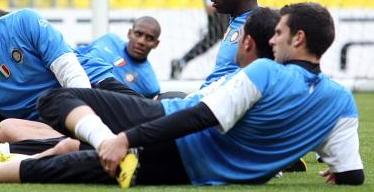
Motta training with Inter in 2010

On 20 May 2009, La Gazzetta dello Sport confirmed that Motta, alongside teammate Diego Milito, transferred to Inter Milan, who paid €28 million for the latter and €10.2 million for the former while as part of the deal, Genoa received five Inter players: Robert Acquafresca, Francesco Bolzoni, Leonardo Bonucci, Ivan Fatić and Riccardo Meggiorini. Motta's agent, Dario Canovi, later revealed that his Genoa contract with the club included a buy-out fee of €10 million.

Motta's debut came in 2009–10's opener, a 1–1 home draw against Bari, and his first goal came the next round as he opened the score in the Derby della Madonnina after an assist by Milito, in the 4–0 defeat of A.C. Milan. Having been in and out of the team for the duration of the season, he netted his first brace for them in a 3–0 win over Bologna on 3 April 2010.

Motta also appeared in eight games during the club's victorious Champions League campaign, including the 0–1 loss at former side Barcelona in the semi-finals (3–2 aggregate win). During that match, he was sent off after apparently striking Sergio Busquets in the face with his hand; the incident gathered attention due to Busquets' apparent feigning of injury.

On 23 October 2011, from a corner taken by Wesley Sneijder, Motta scored through a header in a 1–0 victory against Chievo, which was Inter's first at home in 2011–12.

=== Paris Saint-Germain ===
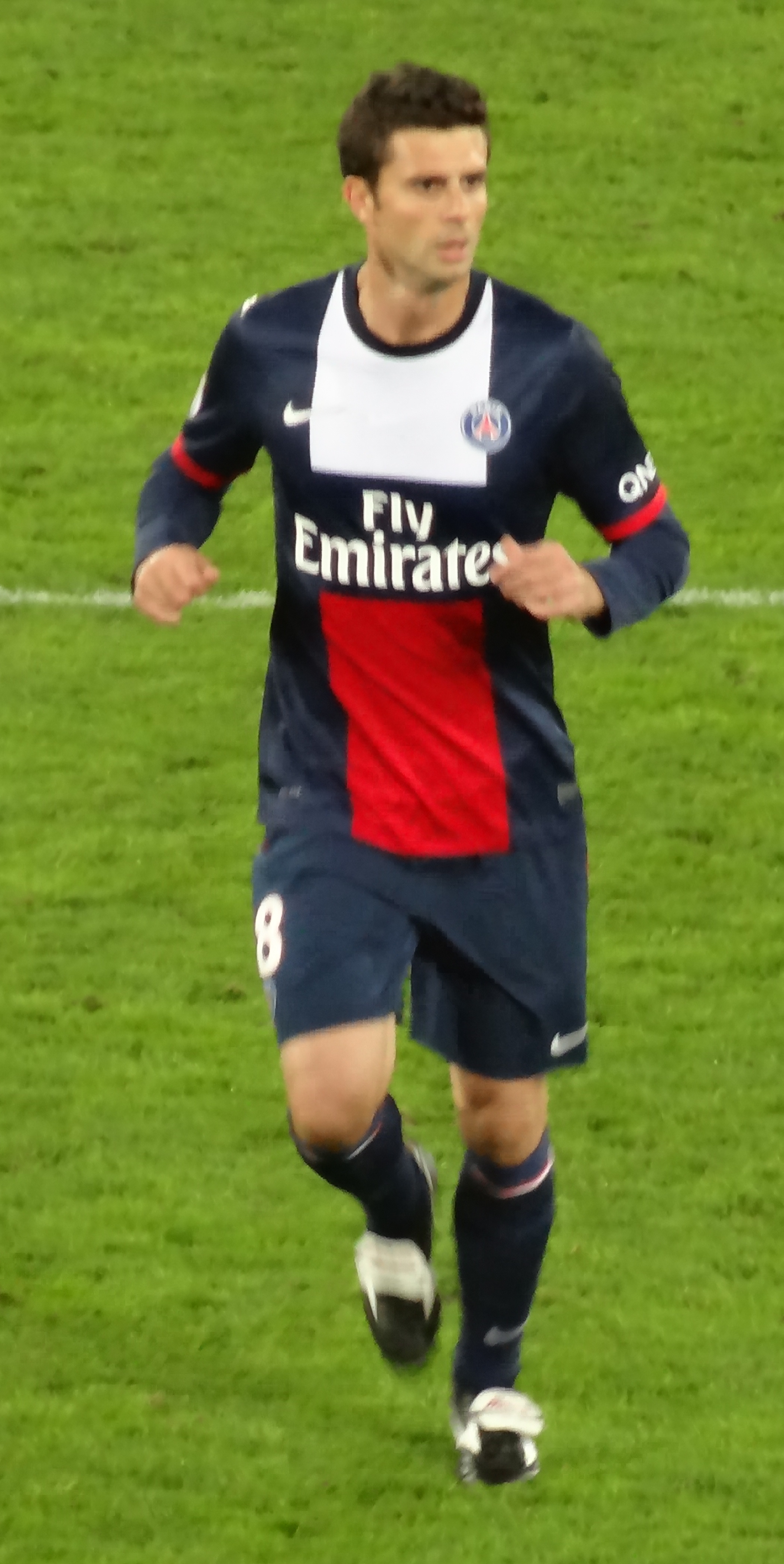
Motta at PSG in 2013

On 31 January 2012, in spite of Inter manager Claudio Ranieri indicating shortly before he was confident the player would remain with the club until the end of the season, having called him to the upcoming league match against Palermo, Motta signed with Paris Saint-Germain in France, for a fee believed to be around €10 million. Following his move, he revealed that he dreamt of playing for the club ever since fellow Brazilians such as Raí, Leonardo and Ronaldinho shone in the French capital; he also revealed that he was not happy at Inter, refusing to further elaborate on his reasons to leave.

Four days after signing for the club, Motta made his debut for PSG, against Evian in a 3–1 home win, being booked in the process. On 22 April 2012, in another home fixture, he scored his first goal in Ligue 1, contributing to a 6–1 rout of Sochaux.

On 21 February 2014, aged 31, Motta extended his contract until June 2016. In August, he was left with a broken nose after being headbutted by Bastia's Brandão in the tunnel, as his opponent went on to be suspended for six months.

Motta announced his retirement for the end of the season on 8 May 2018, while also being appointed as the new coach of PSG's under-19 side. During his six-and-a-half-year stint at the Parc des Princes, he played 232 competitive matches and won 19 trophies, making his final appearance on 19 May against Caen.

== International career ==
=== Brazil ===
Motta made his debut for Brazil in the 2003 CONCACAF Gold Cup. Motta missed the 2004 CONMEBOL Men Pre-Olympic Tournament due to injuries, but appeared for the under-23 team in November 2003 against Santos. Subsequently, there were claims that he wanted to be called up for Italy and possibly to the 2010 FIFA World Cup, as he possessed dual nationality – his paternal grandfather being Italian. His great-grandfather, Fortunato Fogagnolo, left for South America from Polesella in the early 1900s. FIFA granted players to have one chance to change their representing nation if they had dual nationality, but not for players who have already played in a competitive "A" match (non-friendly).

=== Italy ===
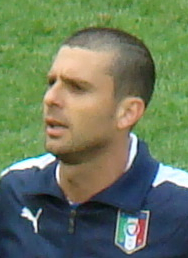
Motta lining up for Italy at Euro 2012

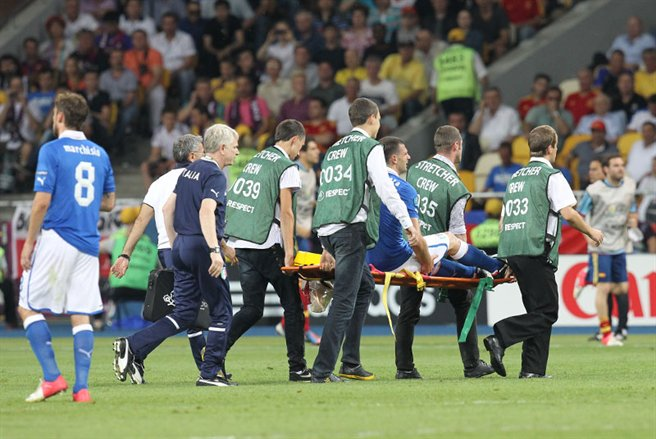
Motta leaving the field during the Euro 2012 final

On 6 February 2011, Motta received his first call-up from Italy, for a friendly against Germany, but an official statement from the Italian Football Federation declared it subject to FIFA clearance, which was granted two days later. He made his debut in that match on 9 February, being replaced in the 63rd minute of the 1–1 draw by Alberto Aquilani.

On 25 March 2011, in only his second international, a UEFA Euro 2012 qualifier in Slovenia, Motta scored the game's only goal following a 73rd-minute combination with Federico Balzaretti. He was selected to the finals in Poland and Ukraine, starting in three group stage matches for the Azzurri and adding two substitute appearances, against Germany in the semi-finals (2–1 win) and Spain in the final; in the decisive match, after having again replaced Riccardo Montolivo, in the 55th minute, he suffered a hamstring injury after only five minutes and had to be carried off, leaving his team with ten players as he was the third and last allowable player brought in by manager Cesare Prandelli – in an eventual 0–4 loss.

Motta was named in a 30-man provisional squad for the 2014 FIFA World Cup on 13 May, and also made the final list. He played his first-ever game in the tournament at the age of nearly 32, coming on in the 57th minute of the 2–1 opening group stage victory over England on 14 June.

On 31 May 2016, Motta was named to Antonio Conte's 23-man Italy squad for Euro 2016, and was handed the number 10 shirt. The decision to assign him that number sparked controversy, although international teammate Daniele De Rossi later defended the manager's decision stating: "Those who have joked about it just don't know much about football. Just play the ball around a bit with Thiago Motta and then you will rinse your mouth out. He might not be a No. 10 like Baggio or Totti, but technically he's a master." He made four appearances throughout the tournament, but was suspended for the quarter-final match against Germany, after being booked for the second time in the competition in the previous round against Spain; his substitute appearance in the 2–0 round of 16 victory on 27 June was his 30th and final cap for Italy, as his team were eliminated on penalties in the next round following a 1–1 draw.

== Style of play ==
A combative player, Motta was usually deployed as either a defensive or central midfielder, but he was capable of playing in various other midfield positions due to his tactical intelligence and versatility. In the Italy national team, under Prandelli, he was on occasion deployed as a deep-lying playmaker or an attacking midfielder, due to his ability to set the tempo of his team's play in midfield with his passing. At Euro 2012, he played in a new role of false attacking midfielder in Prandelli's 4–3–1–2 formation. His role has also been likened to that of a metodista ("centre-half," in Italian football jargon), due to his ability to dictate play in midfield as well as assist his team defensively.

Motta's most prominent traits were his ball control, technique, vision and passing range, although he was also praised for his tackling, ability to read the game and consistent defensive attributes as a ball winner. Due to his physical strength, heading accuracy and ability to make late attacking runs from behind into the penalty area, he excelled in the air, and also possessed a powerful long-range shot; despite his skills, he was also criticised for his aggression on the pitch and his lack of pace. Moreover, he was known to be injury-prone.

== Managerial career ==
In August 2019, following his spell as coach of Paris Saint-Germain's under-19 side, Motta enrolled in the UEFA Pro Licence courses at the Centro Tecnico Federale di Coverciano; he successfully obtained the license on 16 September 2020.

=== Genoa ===
On 21 October 2019, his former club Genoa, at the time occupying the second-to-last position in the Italian top tier, announced his appointment as the new manager, replacing the recently dismissed Aurelio Andreazzoli. In his first official match in charge, five days later, he led the team to come from behind and achieve a 3–1 home win over Brescia. With the side in last place, however, he was fired on 28 December.

=== Spezia ===
On 5 July 2021, Motta was appointed head coach of Serie A club Spezia, replacing departing manager Vincenzo Italiano following the latter's departure to Fiorentina. With a team widely touted for relegation also due to an impending transfer market ban, and despite a difficult start of season which almost led the club to dismiss him by December, Motta turned Spezia's fortunes by January, and was also awarded the Serie A Coach of the Month award after achieving three consecutive wins.

On 15 May 2022, following a win at Udinese, Motta successfully guided Spezia to escape relegation for the second season in a row with still a game to go. Motta left Spezia by mutual agreement on 28 June 2022.

=== Bologna ===
On 12 September 2022, Motta was named new head coach of Serie A club Bologna, replacing Siniša Mihajlović. He was named Coach of the Month in February 2023, having achieved three victories in four matches during that month. He eventually led Bologna to a ninth-place finish with 54 points in 2022–23, setting a new record for the team.

In his full season in charge in 2023–24, he was awarded Coach of the Month in both February and March. Subsequently, he managed to guide the club to clinch a UEFA Champions League berth for the first time since 1964–65, ensuring a top-five finish in Serie A.

On 23 May 2024, the club announced that Motta had declined to extend his contract, signaling his imminent departure. However, he eventually managed to achieve a new record at the club with 68 points.

=== Juventus ===
On 12 June 2024, Motta was appointed as head coach of Serie A club Juventus, signing a three-year contract.

On 23 March 2025, Motta was sacked by Juventus following a stretch of calamitous results culminating in a 4–0 loss to Atalanta and 3–0 defeat to Fiorentina. He was replaced by Igor Tudor.

== Style of management ==
Following his retirement from professional football in May 2018, Motta became the new coach of Paris Saint-Germain's under-19 side. In an interview with La Gazzetta dello Sport in November of that year, he stated that he wanted to revolutionise football with a 4–3–3 formation that could be interpreted as a 2–7–2, commenting:

"My idea is to play offensively. A short team that controls the game, high pressure and a lot of movement with and without the ball. I want the player that has the ball to always have three or four solutions and two teammates close by to help. The difficulty in football is, often to do things simply but to control the base, pass and get free. I don't like the numbers of the field because they trick you. You can be super offensive with a 5–3–2 and defensive in a 4–3–3. Depending on the quality of the guys. I had a game a while ago where the two full-backs ended up playing as the 9 and 10. But that doesn't mean I don't like people like Samuel and Chiellini, born defenders. Could it be a 2–7–2? No, the goalkeeper counts as one of the midfield seven. For me, the attacker is the first defender and the goalkeeper is the first attacker. The goalkeeper starts the play, with his feet and the attackers are the first to put pressure to recover the ball."

He has also been known to use an attacking 4–2–3–1 formation.

== Career statistics ==
=== Club ===
Appearances and goals by club, season and competition
Club	Season	League			National Cup (Note: Includes Copa del Rey, Coppa Italia, and Coupe de France)		League Cup (Note: Includes Coupe de la Ligue)		Continental		Other		Total	
Club	Season	Division	Apps	Goals	Apps	Goals	Apps	Goals	Apps	Goals	Apps	Goals	Apps	Goals
Barcelona	2001–02	La Liga	18	1	0	0	—		7 (Note: All appearances in UEFA Champions League)	0	—		25	1
Barcelona	2002–03	La Liga	21	3	0	0	—		13	2	—		34	5
Barcelona	2003–04	La Liga	20	1	0	0	—		5 (Note: All appearances in UEFA Cup)	1	—		25	2
Barcelona	2004–05	La Liga	8	0	0	0	—		0	0	—		8	0
Barcelona	2005–06	La Liga	15	1	0	0	—		7	0	0	0	22	1
Barcelona	2006–07	La Liga	14	0	2	0	—		7 (Note: Six appearances in UEFA Champions League, one appearance in UEFA Super Cup)	0	2 (Note: All appearances in Supercopa de España)	0	25	0
Barcelona	Total		96	6	2	0	—		39	3	2	0	139	9
Atlético Madrid	2007–08	La Liga	6	0	0	0	—		2	0	—		8	0
Genoa	2008–09	Serie A	27	6	0	0	—		—		—		27	6
Inter Milan	2009–10	Serie A	26	4	5	0	—		8	0	1 (Note: Appearance in Supercoppa Italiana)	0	40	4
Inter Milan	2010–11	Serie A	19	4	3	0	—		5	1	2 (Note: All appearances in FIFA Club World Cup)	0	29	5
Inter Milan	2011–12	Serie A	10	3	1	0	—		2	0	1	0	14	3
Inter Milan	Total		55	11	9	0	—		15	1	4	0	83	12
Paris Saint-Germain	2011–12	Ligue 1	14	2	2	0	0	0	0	0	—		16	2
Paris Saint-Germain	2012–13	Ligue 1	12	1	1	0	0	0	2	0	—		15	1
Paris Saint-Germain	2013–14	Ligue 1	32	3	2	1	3	0	9	2	1 (Note: Appearance in Trophée des Champions)	0	47	6
Paris Saint-Germain	2014–15	Ligue 1	27	0	2	0	2	0	6	0	1	0	38	0
Paris Saint-Germain	2015–16	Ligue 1	32	1	3	0	1	0	9	0	1	0	46	1
Paris Saint-Germain	2016–17	Ligue 1	30	0	4	1	2	0	5	0	1	0	42	1
Paris Saint-Germain	2017–18	Ligue 1	19	1	4	0	0	0	4	0	1	0	28	1
Paris Saint-Germain	Total		166	8	18	2	8	0	35	2	5	0	232	12
Career total			350	31	29	2	8	0	91	6	11	0	489	39

=== International ===
Appearances and goals by national team and year
National team	Year	Apps	Goals
Brazil	2003	2	0
Brazil	Total	2	0
Italy	2011	6	1
Italy	2012	7	0
Italy	2013	5	0
Italy	2014	5	0
Italy	2015	0	0
Italy	2016	7	0
Italy	Total	30	1
Career total		32	1

Scores and results list Italy's goal tally first, score column indicates score after each Motta goal.

List of international goals scored by Thiago Motta
No.	Date	Venue	Opponent	Score	Result	Competition	Ref.
1	25 March 2011	Stadion Stožice, Ljubljana, Slovenia	Slovenia	1–0	1–0	UEFA Euro 2012 qualifying	

== Managerial statistics ==
As of 16 March 2025

Managerial record by team and tenure
Team	From	To	Record							
Team	From	To	G	W	D	L	GF	GA	GD	Win%
Genoa	22 October 2019	28 December 2019	10	2	3	5	11	17	−6	20.00
Spezia	8 July 2021	29 June 2022	40	11	6	23	44	74	−30	27.50
Bologna	12 September 2022	24 May 2024	76	35	24	17	107	74	+33	46.05
Juventus	1 July 2024	23 March 2025	42	18	17	7	63	42	+21	42.86
Career Total			168	66	50	52	225	207	+18	39.29

== Honours ==
=== Player ===
Barcelona

- La Liga: 2004–05, 2005–06
- Supercopa de España: 2006
- UEFA Champions League: 2005–06

Inter Milan

- Serie A: 2009–10
- Coppa Italia: 2009–10, 2010–11
- Supercoppa Italiana: 2010
- UEFA Champions League: 2009–10
- FIFA Club World Cup: 2010

Paris Saint-Germain

- Ligue 1: 2012–13, 2013–14, 2014–15, 2015–16, 2017–18
- Coupe de France: 2014–15, 2015–16, 2016–17, 2017–18
- Coupe de la Ligue: 2013–14, 2014–15, 2015–16, 2016–17
- Trophée des Champions: 2013, 2014, 2015, 2016, 2017

Brazil

- South American Under-17 Football Championship: 1999
- CONCACAF Gold Cup runner-up: 2003

Italy

- UEFA European Championship runner-up: 2012

Individual

- Don Balón Award – Breakthrough player in La Liga: 2002–03
- Serie A Team of the Year: 2010–11
- Ligue 1 Team of the Year: 2013–14

=== Manager ===
Individual

- Serie A Coach of the Month: January 2022, February 2023, February 2024, March 2024

== See also ==
- List of association footballers who have been capped for two senior national teams
