= 2021–22 Juventus FC Under-23 season =

Juventus U23
2021–22 season
- Chairman: Andrea Agnelli
- Manager: Lamberto Zauli
- Stadium: Stadio Giuseppe Moccagatta
- Serie C: 8th
- Coppa Italia Serie C: Round of 16

The 2021–22 season is the 4th season in the existence of Juventus U23 and the club's 4th consecutive season in the Serie C, the third level of Italian football. In addition to the domestic league, Juventus U23 also played this season's edition of the Coppa Italia Serie C.

== Pre-season and friendlies ==
On 7 August 2021, Juventus U23 played a friendly against Pro Vercelli, winning 4–0. On 13 August, Juventus played a friendly Como. In the 4th minute Matías Soulé scored the opening goal giving Juventus U23 the lead. 11 minutes later, Belgianmen Moutir Chajia scored the equalizing goal. On 19 August, Juventus U23 played a friendly against their first team Juventus losing 3–0.

7 August 2021 Friendly	Juventus U23 (Italy)	4–0	(Italy) Pro Vercelli	Vinovo, Turin
17:00 CEST	Correia 13' (pen.); Miretti 30'; Clemenza 76', 79'	Report		Stadium: Juventus Training Center; Attendance: 0 Referee: Gualtieri

13 August 2021 Friendly	Juventus U23 (Italy)	1–1	(Italy) Como	Vinovo, Turin
18:00 CEST	Soulé 4'	Report	Chajia 15'	Stadium: Juventus Training Center; Attendance: 0 Referee: Daniele Virgilio (Trapani)

19 August 2021 Friendly	Juventus (Italy)	3–0	(Italy) Juventus U23	Continassa, Turin
18:00 CEST (UTC+2)	Dybala 7'; Morata 26'; Ramsey 35'	Report		Stadium: Juventus Training Center; Attendance: About 400; Referee: Michele Giordano

== Serie C ==
=== Overview ===
Juventus U23 began their league on 29 August 2021 against Pergolettese.

29 August 2021 1	Pergolettese	1–2	Juventus U23	Cremona
17:30 CEST	Zennaro 58'	Report	Miretti 37'; Brighenti 75'; Zuelli (yellow card) 83'; Aké (yellow card) 90'	Stadium: Stadio Giuseppe Voltini; Attendance: 570; Referee: Giuseppe Votlini

12 September 2021 3	Pro Patria	1–0	Juventus U23	Busto Arsizio
20:30 CEST	Caprile (yellow card) 12'; Bertoni 28', (yellow card) 41'; Colombo (yellow card) 84'; Boffelli (yellow card) 90'	Report	Aké (penalty missed) 19'; Pecorino (yellow card) 26'; De Winter (yellow card) 34'; Sersanti (yellow card) 72'	Stadium: Stadio Carlo Speroni; Attendance: 550; Referee: Francesco Burlando

19 September 2021 4	Juventus U23	0–2	Pro Vercelli	Vercelli
17:30 CEST	Leone (yellow card) 38'; Sersanti (yellow card) 53'; Stramaccioni (yellow card) 80'; Miretti (penalty missed) 89'	Report	Macchioni 17'; Awua (yellow card) 27'; Rolando 56', (yellow card) 57'; Jezzi (yellow card) 84'	Stadium: Stadio Silvio Piola; Attendance: 167; Referee: Luca Angelucci

22 September 2021 2	Juventus U23	2–1	Triestina	Alessandria
16:30 CEST	Sekulov 40'; Barbieri (yellow card) 41'; Pecorino (yellow card) 51'; Compagnon (yellow card) 87'; Riccio (yellow card) 90'; Aké 90+2'	Report	Natalucci (yellow card) 11'; Negro 30'; Crimi (yellow card) 73'; Henrique (yellow card) 88'	Stadium: Stadio Giuseppe Moccagatta; Attendance: 150; Referee: Gabriele Scatena
Note: Match postponed from 4 September 2021.

26 September 2021 5	Feralpisalò	3–2	Juventus U23	Salò
14:30 CEST	Bergonzi (yellow card) 36'; Guerra 56'; Luppi 64', 80' (pen.)	Report	Sekulov 10'; Aké 80'; Soulé (yellow card) 90'	Stadium: Stadio Lino Turina; Attendance: 225; Referee: Maria Sole Caputi

29 September 2021 6	Juventus U23	0–1	Giana Erminio	Alessandria
17:30 CEST		Report	Pirola (yellow card) 73'; Pinto 79'	Stadium: Stadio Giuseppe Moccagatta; Attendance: 80; Referee: Francesco d'Eusanio

3 October 2021 7	Mantova	0–1	Juventus U23	Mantova
14:30 CEST	Agbugui (yellow card) 11'; Vaccaro (yellow card) 73'; Pilati (yellow card) 80'	Report	Anzolin (yellow card) 34'; Miretti (penalty missed) 58' 58'; Soulé (yellow card) 77'	Stadium: Stadio Danilo Martelli; Attendance: 1,300; Referee: Marco Emmanuele

17 October 2021 9	Juventus U23	2–1	Seregno	Alessandria
17:30 CEST	Sekulov 39', 72'; Barbieri (yellow card) 54'; De Winter (yellow card) 77'	Report	Borghese 3', (yellow card) 40'; Rossi (yellow card) 15'; Cernigoi (penalty missed) 62'; Jimenez (yellow card) 85'	Stadium: Stadio Giuseppe Moccagatta; Attendance: 120; Referee: Luigi Carella

20 October 2021 10	AlbinoLeffe	2–2	Juventus U23	Bergamo
14:30 CEST	Manconi 40'; R. Riva (yellow card) 59'; Giorgione 65'	Report	Barbieri (yellow card) 21'; Kaio Jorge (penalty missed) 28', 47'; Sersanti (yellow card) 50'; Poli (yellow card) 60'; Pecorino 66', (yellow card) 74'; De Winter (red card) 85'	Stadium: Stadio Atleti Azzurri d'Italia; Attendance: 131; Referee: Luigi Catanoso

24 October 2021 11	Juventus U23	1–1	Pro Sesto	Alessandria
14:30 CEST	Poli (yellow card) 13'; Cudrig (penalty missed) 24'; Da Graca 89'; Soulé (penalty missed) 90+5'	Report	Capogna 33' (yellow card) 33'; Caverzasi (yellow card) 54'; Maldini (yellow card) 65'; Ghezzi (yellow card) 76'	Stadium: Stadio Giuseppe Moccagatta; Referee: Michele Delirio

27 October 2021 8	Piacenza	1–1	Juventus U23	Piacenza
20:30 CEST	Corbari 32'; Suljić (yellow card) 36'; Codromaz (yellow card) 39'	Report	De Winter 47'; Leo (yellow card) 90+2'	Stadium: Stadio Leonardo Garilli; Referee: Caldera

31 October 2021 12	Südtirol	2–0	Juventus U23	Bolzano
14:30 CET	Casiraghi 20'; Moscati (yellow card) 36'	Report	Poli (yellow card) 20'; Aké (yellow card) 45+5'	Stadium: Stadio Druso; Referee: Cascone

7 November 2021 13	Juventus U23	1–0	Lecco	Alessandria
14:30 CET	Sersanti (yellow card) 21'; Aké (yellow card) 39'; Soulé 43'; Stramaccioni (yellow card) 45'; Cudrig (yellow card) 90+2'	Report	Tordini (yellow card) 90+3'; Celjak (yellow card) 90+4'	Stadium: Stadio Giuseppe Moccagatta

20 November 2021 14	Juventus U23	2–1	Fiorenzuola	Alessandria
14:30 CET	Miretti (yellow card) 41'; Aké 49', 75'; Pecorino (yellow card) 56'; Stramaccioni (yellow card) 58'	Report	Olivera (yellow card) 69'; Arrondini 78'	Stadium: Stadio Giuseppe Moccagatta

28 November 2021 15	Juventus U23	0–1	Virtus Verona	Alessandria
17:30 CET	Stramaccioni (yellow card) 12'; Sersanti (yellow card) 58'	Report	M. Daffara (yellow card) 41'; Pittarello 56' (pen.); Zugaro (yellow card) 64'; Mazzolo (yellow card) 84'; Arma (yellow card) 90+1'	Stadium: Stadio Giuseppe Moccagatta

1 December 2021 16	Padova	2–0	Juventus U23	Padua
14:30 CET	Kirwan (yellow card) 14'; Ceravolo 45+1'; Pelagatti (yellow card) 54'; Ronaldo (yellow card) 57'	Report	Poli (yellow card) 8'; Leo (yellow card) 60'; Zuelli (yellow card) 74'	Stadium: Stadio Euganeo

5 December 2021 17	Renate	2–0	Juventus U23	Renate
14:30 CET	Maistrello 15'; Silva (yellow card) 31'; Ermacola (yellow card) 56'; Celeghin 67', (yellow card) 81'; Marano (red card) 90+4'	Report		Stadium: Città di Meda

12 December 2021 18	Juventus U23	2–1	Trento	Alessandria
14:30 CET	Leo (yellow card) 38'; Compagnon 78'; Miretti 86'	Report	Pasquato 2'; Belcastro (yellow card) 44'; Chinellato (yellow card) 80'	Stadium: Stadio Giuseppe Moccagatta

18 December 2021 19	Legnago	1–2	Juventus U23	Legnago
14:30 CET	Burić 28'; Yabré (yellow card) 54'; Pitzalis (yellow card) 62'	Report	Brighenti 24'; Compagnon 32'; Anzolin (yellow card) 61'; Zuelli (yellow card) 64'; Aké (yellow card) 90'	Stadium: Stadio Mario Sandrini

21 December 2021 20	Juventus U23	1–1	Pergolettese	Alessandria
14:30 CET	Brighenti 54'	Report	Lucenti (yellow card) 26'; Arini (yellow card) 31'; Varas 62' (pen.); Verzeni (yellow card) 83'	Stadium: Stadio Giuseppe Moccagatta

23 January 2022 21	Pro Vercelli	2–0	Juventus U23	Vercelli
14:30 CET	Comi 6'; Della Morte 8', (yellow card) 60'; Cristini (yellow card) 63'; Crialese (yellow card) 68'; Gatto (red card) 76'	Report	Iocolano (yellow card) 66'	Stadium: Stadio Silvio Piola

29 January 2022 22	Juventus U23	1–0	FeralpiSalò	Alessandria
14:30 CET	Aké 33'; Miretti (yellow card) 87'	Report	Bachetti (yellow card) 70'; Guerra (yellow card) 87'	Stadium: Stadio Giuseppe Moccagatta

1 February 2022 23	Triestina	0–0	Juventus U23	Trieste
14:30 CET	Crimi (yellow card) 34'; Iotti (yellow card) 90+3'	Report	Leo (yellow card) 60'; Brighenti (yellow card) 84'	Stadium: Stadio Nereo Rocco

6 February 2022 24	Giana Erminio	2–0	Juventus U23	Città di Gorgonzola
14:30	Gerico (yellow card) 36'; Tremolada 47'; D' Ausilio 65'; Magli (yellow card) 78'	Report	Barbieri (yellow card) 65'

13 February 2022 25	Juventus U23	3–0	Mantova	Alessandria
14:30 CET	Brighenti 19'; Compagnon 32', 34'; Poli (yellow card) 46'; Stramaccioni (yellow card) 81'; Zuelli (yellow card) 90'	Report	Pilati (yellow card) 39'; Gerbaudo (yellow card) 45'; Checchi (yellow card) 85'	Stadium: Stadio Giuseppe Moccagatta

17 February 2022 26	Juventus U23	4–0	Piacenza	Alessandria
	Riccio 11'; Poli 24'; Iocolano 29'; Soulé 66'	Report	Suljić	Stadium: Stadio Giuseppe Moccagatta

20 February 2022 27	Seregno	2–2	Juventus U23	Seregno
14:30 CET	Vitale 3'; Gomez 29'	Report	Cudrig 69'; Pecorino 88'	Stadium: Ferruccio

23 February 2022 28	Juventus U23	1–0	Pro Patria	Alessandria
14:30 CET	Brighenti 71' (pen.)	Report		Stadium: Stadio Giuseppe Moccagatta

27 February 2022 29	Juventus U23	1–1	AlbinoLeffe	Alessandria
17:30 CET	Compagnon 17'	Report	Cori 61'	Stadium: Stadio Giuseppe Moccagatta

6 March 2022 30	Pro Sesto	0–1	Juventus U23	Sesto San Giovanni
14:30 CET		Report	De Winter 89'	Stadium: Stadio Breda

13 March 2022 31	Juventus U23	0–1	Sudtirol	Alessandria
14:30 CET		Report	Casiraghi 35'	Stadium: Stadio Giuseppe Moccagatta

16 March 2022 32	Lecco	2–1	Juventus U23	Lecco
18:00 CET	Ganz 43', 73'	Report	Iocolano 33'

20 March 2022 33	Juventus U23	1–2	Padova	Alessandria
17:30 CET	Da Graca 7'	Report	Jelenič 26'; Della Latta 81'	Stadium: Stadio Giuseppe Moccagatta

2 April 2022 34	Virtusvecomp Verona	1–1	Juventus U23	Verona
14:30 CEST	Zigoni 45+1'	Report	Barrenechea 21'	Stadium: Mario Gavagnin-Sinibaldo Nocini

6 April 2022 35	Fiorenzuola	1–0	Juventus U23	Fiorenzuola d'Arda
18:00 CEST	Stronato 62'	Report		Stadium: Comunale-Velodromo Attilio Pavesi

10 April 2022 36	Juventus	2–1	Renate	Alessandria
17:30 CEST	Brighenti 36'; Zuelli 53'	Report	Rossetti 48'	Stadium: Stadio Giuseppe Moccagatta

16 April 2022 37	AC Trento	1–1	Juventus U23	Trento
14:30 CEST	Izzillo 78' (pen.)	Report	Soulé

24 April 2022 38	Juventus U23	3–2	Legnago	Alessandria
14:30 CEST	Compagnon 63'; Cudrig 86'; Da Graca 90'	Report	Contini 57', 73' (pen.)	Stadium: Stadio Giuseppe Moccagatta

== Coppa Italia Serie C ==
Juventus U23 started the competition as defending champions having won the cup in the 2019–20 season winning 3–2 against Pro Sesto. Juventus U23 were able to come back from the two goals' disadvantage scored by Daniele Grandi in the first minute with a diagonal shoot and by Federico Marchesi in the 16th minute with a header from a corner kick. In the 34th minute Alessandro Sersanti scored the 1–2 goal thus reducing the disadvantage and six minutes later Nicolò Cudrig levelled the result. In the 108th minute, in the extra-time, Fabio Miretti gave the lead to Juventus U23 through a penalty kick.

22 August 2021 First round	Pro Sesto	2–3 (a.e.t.)	Juventus U23	Sesto San Giovanni
18:00 CEST	Grandi 1'; Marchesi 16'	Report	Sersanti 34'; Cudrig 40'; Miretti 108' (pen.)	Stadium: Stadio Breda

15 September 2021 Second round	Juventus U23	3–2	FeralpiSalò	Alessandria
16:30 CEST	Soulé 45+3', 59'; Compagnon 67', (penalty missed) 90+3'	Report	Spagnoli (yellow card) 18', (goal) 45+1'; Di Molfetta (yellow card) 44'; Luppi 88'; Pisano (yellow card) 90+2'	Stadium: Giuseppe Moccagatta; Referee: Daniele Virgilio

3 November 2021 Round of 16	Südtirol	2–1	Juventus U23	Bolzano
17:00 CET	Davì (yellow card) 29'; Odogwu 35'; Candellone 41'	Report	Sersanti (yellow card) 45+1'; Nicolussi 61'; De Winter (yellow card) 90+1'	Stadium: Druso; Referee: Costanza

== Serie C play-offs ==
1 May 2022 First round	Juventus U23	0–0	Piacenza	Alessandria
17:30 CEST		Report		Stadium: Stadio Giuseppe Moccagatta
Note: Juventus U23 advance to the following round due to higher placement during the regular season

4 May 2022 Second round	Pro Vercelli	0–1	Juventus U23	Vercelli
20:30 CEST		Report	Compagnon 58'	Stadium: Stadio Silvio Piola

=== Third round ===
8 May 2022 First leg	Juventus U23	1–1	Renate	Alessandria
18:00 CEST	Compagnon 29'	Report	Enrico Celeghin	Stadium: Stadio Giuseppe Moccagatta

12 May 2022 Second leg	Renate	0–1	Juventus U23	Renate
20:30 CEST		Report	Da Graca 30'	Stadium: Città di Meda

=== Quarter-finals ===
17 May 2022 First leg	Juventus U23	0–1	Padova	Alessandria
21:00 CEST		Report	Chiricò 67'	Stadium: Stadio Giuseppe Moccagatta

21 May 2022 Second leg	Padova	0–1	Juventus U23	Padua
20:30 CEST		Report	Barrenechea 12'	Stadium: Stadio Euganeo

== Transfers ==
=== Summer ===
==== In ====
Arrivals
Date	Pos.	Name	From	Type	Fee	Ref.
15 July 2021	DF	(Switzerland) Albian Hajdari	(Switzerland) Basel	End of loan	Free	
29 July 2021	FW	(Italy) Nicolò Cudrig	(France) Monaco	Free transfer	Free	
30 July 2021	MF	(Italy) Alessandro Sersanti	Fiorentina	Transfer	Undisclosed	
9 August 2021	DF	(Italy) Fabrizio Poli	Virtus Entella	Transfer	Undisclosed	
9 August 2021	MF	(Italy) Emanuele Zuelli	Chievo	Free transfer	Free	
10 August 2021	DF	(Bosnia and Herzegovina) Tarik Muharemović	(Austria) Wolfsberger AC	Transfer	Undisclosed	
27 August 2021	MF	(Norway) Martin Palumbo	Udinese	Loan with option to buy	Undisclosed	
Other transfers (Note: Players part of the previous season's first-team squad, or who weren't included in this season's first-team squad.)
1 July 2021	DF	(Switzerland) Nikita Vlasenko	(Switzerland) FC Sion	End of loan		

==== Out ====
Departures
Date	Pos.	Name	To	Type	Fee	Ref.
27 May 2021	DF	(Brazil) Lucas Rosa	(Spain) Real Valladolid	End of contract	Free	
22 June 2021	FW	(Italy) Marco Olivieri	Lecce	Loan with option to buy	Free	
1 July 2021	MF	(Italy) Michele Troiano		Retired	Free	
9 July 2021	FW	(Italy) Luca Zanimacchia	Cremonese	Loan	Free	
9 July 2021	FW	(Albania) Giacomo Vrioni	(Austria) WSG Tirol	Loan	Free	
14 July 2021	FW	(Denmark) Nikolai Baden Frederiksen	(Netherlands) Vitesse	Permanent	Undisclosed	
15 July 2021	DF	(Italy) Pietro Beruatto	Pisa	Loan	Free	
15 July 2021	MF	(Germany) Idrissa Touré	Pisa	Permanent	€1M	
20 July 2021	DF	(Italy) Riccardo Capellini	(Spain) Mirandés	Loan	Free	
21 July 2021	DF	(Italy) Paolo Gozzi	(Spain) Fuenlabrada	Loan	Free	
23 July 2021	DF	(Italy) Luca Coccolo	SPAL	Loan with option to buy	Free	
27 July 2021	MF	(Italy) Alessandro Di Pardo	Vicenza	Loan	Free	
6 August 2021	GK	(Italy) Mattia Del Favero	Cosenza	Loan	Free	
6 August 2021	DF	(Italy) Alessandro Minelli	Cosenza	Loan	Free	
9 August 2021	FW	(Italy) Matteo Brunori	Palermo	Loan	Free	
13 August 2021	FW	(Portugal) Félix Correia	Parma	Loan with option to buy	Undisclosed	
14 August 2021	MF	(Cyprus) Grigoris Kastanos	Salernitana	Loan	Undisclosed	
18 August 2021	DF	(Switzerland) Nikita Vlasenko	(Netherlands) SBV Excelsior	Loan	Free	
18 August 2021	MF	(Tunisia) Hamza Rafia	(Belgium) Standard Liège	Loan with option to buy	Undisclosed	
19 August 2021	MF	(Belgium) Daouda Peeters	(Belgium) Standard Liège	Loan with option to buy	Free	
21 August 2021	DF	(Italy) Erasmo Mulè	Cesena	Loan	Free	
25 August 2021	FW	(Italy) Mirco Lipari	Juve Stabia	Loan	Free	
25 August 2021	DF	(Italy) Giuseppe Verduci	Grosseto	Loan	Free	
26 August 2021	DF	(Italy) Dario Del Fabro	(Belgium) Seraing	Loan	Free	
27 August 2021	FW	(Colombia) Alejandro Marqués	(Spain) Mirandés	Loan	Free	
31 August 2021	DF	(Italy) Filippo Delli Carri	Salernitana	Loan	Free	
31 August 2021	MF	(Italy) Filippo Ranocchia	Vicenza	Loan	Free	
31 August 2021	DF	(Romania) Radu Drăgușin	Sampdoria	Loan	Free	
31 August 2021	MF	(Italy) Nicolò Fagioli	Cremonese	Loan	Free	

== Player statistics ==
As of match played 21 May 2022

No.	Pos	Nat	Player	Total		Serie C		Coppa Italia Serie C		Serie C play-offs	
No.	Pos	Nat	Player	Apps	Goals	Apps	Goals	Apps	Goals	Apps	Goals
Goalkeepers
1	GK	(Uruguay) URU	Franco Israel	39	0	32	0	1	0	6	0
12	GK	(Italy) ITA	Giovanni Garofani	7	0	5	0	2	0	0	0
22	GK	(Italy) ITA	Marco Raina	0	0	0	0	0	0	0	0
44	GK	(Italy) ITA	Alessandro Siano	1	0	1	0	0	0	0	0
Defenders
2	DF	(Switzerland) SUI	Daniel Leo	28	0	18+2	0	1+1	0	5+1	0
3	DF	(Italy) ITA	Diego Stramaccioni	21	0	14+3	0	1	0	1+2	0
4	DF	(Italy) ITA	Alessandro Pio Riccio	27	1	21+3	1	1	0	1+1	0
5	DF	(Belgium) BEL	Koni De Winter	31	2	18+4	2	3	0	6	0
6	DF	(Italy) ITA	Matteo Anzolin	34	0	22+4	0	1+1	0	6	0
13	DF	(Italy) ITA	Fabrizio Poli	31	1	24+2	1	1	0	4	0
15	DF	(Italy) ITA	Giuseppe Verduci	7	0	7	0	0	0	0	0
18	DF	(France) FRA	Jean-Claude Ntenda	4	0	0+2	0	1+1	0	0	0
24	DF	(Austria) AUT	Ervin Omić	1	0	0+1	0	0	0	0	0
30	DF	(Romania) ROU	Gabriele Boloca	1	0	1	0	0	0	0	0
26	DF	(Italy) ITA	Tommaso Barbieri	31	0	22+5	0	2	0	1+1	0
34	DF	(Italy) ITA	Riccardo Turicchia	2	0	0+2	0	0	0	0	0
36	DF	(Italy) ITA	Filippo Fiumanò	2	0	1+1	0	0	0	0	0
Midfielders
7	MF	(Italy) ITA	Nikola Sekulov	41	4	18+15	4	2+1	0	0+5	0
8	MF	(Italy) ITA	Giuseppe Leone	36	0	19+13	0	1+1	0	2	0
10	MF	(Argentina) ARG	Matías Soulé	34	5	21+4	3	2+1	2	6	0
14	MF	(Italy) ITA	Mattia Compagnon	30	9	10+13	6	1+1	1	4+1	2
16	MF	(Italy) ITA	Alessandro Sersanti	36	1	20+7	0	2+1	1	3+3	0
17	MF	(Italy) ITA	Emanuele Zuelli	40	1	25+7	1	2+1	0	4+1	0
19	MF	(Norway) NOR	Martin Palumbo	20	0	10+7	0	1+1	0	0+1	0
20	MF	(Italy) ITA	Luca Clemenza	1	0	0	0	0+1	0	0	0
20	MF	(Italy) ITA	Simone Iocolano	22	2	13+4	2	0	0	4+1	0
21	MF	(Italy) ITA	Fabio Miretti	28	4	22+3	3	3	1	0	0
28	MF	(Argentina) ARG	Enzo Barrenechea	13	2	4+4	1	0	0	4+1	1
41	MF	(Italy) ITA	Hans Nicolussi	7	1	0+2	0	0+1	1	3+1	0
Forwards
9	FW	(Italy) ITA	Marco Da Graca	24	4	11+6	3	0+1	0	6	1
11	FW	(Italy) ITA	Andrea Brighenti	26	6	16+9	6	0+1	0	0	0
23	FW	(France) FRA	Marley Aké	25	5	19+5	5	1	0	0	0
25	FW	(England) ENG	Samuel Iling-Junior	2	0	0+1	0	0+1	0	0	0
27	FW	(Italy) ITA	Nicolò Cudrig	41	3	15+17	2	2+1	1	1+5	0
29	FW	(Brazil) BRA	Kaio Jorge	2	1	2	1	0	0	0	0
30	FW	(Italy) ITA	Mirco Lipari	3	0	0+2	0	0	0	0+1	0
31	FW	(Italy) ITA	Emanuele Pecorino	24	2	8+14	2	1+1	0	0	0
42	FW	(Italy) ITA	Leonardo Cerri	2	0	0+2	0	0	0	0	0

== See also ==
- 2021–22 Juventus F.C. season
- 2021–22 Juventus F.C. (women) season
