= 2022–23 Juventus Next Gen season =

Juventus Next Gen
2022–23 season
- President: Andrea Agnelli (until 18 January 2023); Gianluca Ferrero (from 18 January 2023)
- Head coach: Massimo Brambilla
- Stadium: Stadio Giuseppe Moccagatta
- Serie C: 13th
- Coppa Italia Serie C: Final
Home colours
- All statistics correct as of 1 July 2022.

The 2022–23 season is Juventus Next Gen's fifth season in the Serie C, the third level of Italian football. They will also participate in the Coppa Italia Serie C, the Italian cup for Serie C sides.

== Pre-season and friendlies ==
Win Draw Loss Void

Results list Juventus's goal tally first.

Date	Opponent	Venue	Result	Scorers	Attendance
26 July 2022	Atalanta U19	Away	Cancelled (Note: The match was called off for unknown reasons.)		
31 July 2022	Fossanese	Home	4–0	Zuelli 28', Sersanti 55', Cotter 87', Iocolano 90' (pen.)	0
4 August 2022	Juventus	Neutral	0–2 (Note: The match was called off at the 49th minute due to the annual tradition of pitch invasion.)		3,000
10 August 2022	Sanremese	Home	0–1		0
14 August 2022	Chisola	Home	3–0	Pecorino 7', Poli 20', Sekulov 25'	0
21 August 2022	Alessandria	Home	1–1	Iling-Junior 87' (pen.)	0
28 August 2022	Fluorenzuola	Away	3–0	Sekulov 35', Barbieri 47', Da Graca 74'	0

== Serie C ==
=== Matches ===
Results list Juventus Next Gen's goal tally first.

Date	Opponent	Venue	Result	Scorers
3 September 2022	Trento	Home	2–0	Iling-Junior 13', Pecorino 51'
9 September 2022	Pordenone	Away	1–1	Cudrig 90'+4'
13 September 2022	Padova	Home	1–2	Iling-Junior 88' (pen.)
17 September 2022	Renate	Away	2–3	Rafia 80' (pen.), Sekulov 85'
2 October 2022	Pergolettese	Home	1–1	Besaggio 45'+2' (pen.)
9 October 2022	Piacenza	Away	3–3	Sersanti 40', Barrenechea 80', Iling-Junior 82'
12 October 2022 (Note: The match, previously due to be played on 24 September, had been delayed five days earlier.)	Vicenza	Away	0–2	
16 October 2022	Pro Sesto	Home	3–0	Besaggio 40', Pecorino 43', Cudrig 75'
19 October 2022	Lecco	Away	0–1	
23 October 2022	Triestina	Home	1–0	Compagnon 64'
30 October 2022	AlbinoLeffe	Away	1–1	Iocolano 58'
6 November 2022	Novara	Home	2–1	Rafia 7', Barrenechea 56'
13 November 2022	Pro Vercelli	Home	1–0	Poli 39'
20 November 2022	Pro Patria	Away	1–0	Palumbo 58'
27 November 2022	Mantova	Home	2–2	Iocolano (2) 8', 83'
30 November 2022	Feralpisalò	Away	1–2	Compagnon 40'
4 December 2022	Sangiuliano	Home	1–0	Compagnon 62'
11 December 2022	Arzignano	Away	1–2	Muharemović 6'
17 December 2022	Virtus Verona	Home	0–3	
23 December 2022	Trento	Away	1–2	Iocolano 76'
8 January 2023	Pordenone	Home	1–2	Compagnon 3'
14 January 2023	Padova	Away	1–1	Barrenechea 47' (pen.)
22 January 2023	Renate	Home	1–1	Sekulov 46'
29 January 2023	Vicenza	Home	2–1	Barrenechea 65' (pen.), Pecorino 75'
1 February 2023	Pergolettese	Away	1–0	Pecorino 85'
5 February 2023	Piacenza	Home	2–0	Pecorino (2) 46', 66'
12 February 2023	Pro Sesto	Away	1–1	Sekulov 49'
19 February 2023	Lecco	Home	0–2	
26 February 2023	Triestina	Away	0–1	
5 March 2023	AlbinoLeffe	Home	2–1	Sersanti 71', Cerri 90+3'
12 March 2023	Novara	Away	0–2	
15 March 2023	Pro Vercelli	Away	1–0	Cerri 49'
19 March 2023	Pro Patria	Home	1–1	Compagnon 36'
26 March 2023	Mantova	Away	1–1	Sekulov 45'
2 April 2023	Feralpisalò	Home	1–3	Huijsen 54'
8 April 2023	Sangiuliano	Away	1–0	Cerri 8'
16 April 2023	Arzignano	Home	0–1	
23 April 2023	Virtus Verona	Away	1–4	Cudrig 12'

== Coppa Italia Serie C ==
=== Matches ===
Results list Juventus Next Gen's goal tally first

Date	Round	Opponent	Venue	Result	Scorers
5 October 2022	First round	Lecco	Home	3–1	Sangalli 26' (o.g.), Da Graca 52', Iling-Junior 84'
2 November 2022	Second round	FeralpiSalò	Home	5–2	Iocolano 10', Compagnon 20', Verduci 38', Sersanti 70', Lipari 87'
15 November 2022	Round of 16	Sangiuliano	Away	1–0	Cudrig 36'
7 December 2022	Quarter-final	Padova	Away	2–1	Cerri 52', Sekulov 55'
18 January 2023	Semi-final	Foggia	Away	1–2	Poli 21'
15 February 2023	Semi-final	Foggia	Home	2–1 (Note: Juventus won 5–4 at penalty shoot-out after extra time.)	Huijsen (2) 43', 53'
2 March 2023	Final	Vicenza	Home	1–2	Iling-Junior 49'
11 April 2023	Final	Vicenza	Away	3–2	Sekulov 19', Poli 56'

== Transfers ==
=== Out ===
Departures
Date	Pos.	Name	To	Type	Fee	Ref.
18 June 2022	DF	(Austria) Ervin Omić	(Austria) Wolfsberger AC	Free transfer	Free	
1 July 2022	MF	(Norway) Martin Palumbo	Udinese	End of loan	Free	
1 July 2022	FW	(Benin) Angel Chibozo	(France) Amiens	Loan with obligation to buy	N/A	
5 July 2022	GK	(Uruguay) Franco Israel	(Portugal) Sporting	Permanent	€1M	
5 July 2022	MF	(Switzerland) Kristian Šekularac	(England) Fulham	Free transfer	Free	
7 July 2022	GK	(Italy) Mattia Del Favero	Pro Patria	Loan	Free	
12 July 2022	MF	(Italy) Hans Nicolussi	Südtirol	Loan	Free	
14 July 2022	GK	(Italy) Alessandro Siano	Pontedera	Free transfer	Free	
14 July 2022	DF	(Italy) Davide De Marino	Pescara	Loan with option to buy	N/A	
20 July 2022	DF	(Italy) Matteo Anzolin	(Austria) Wolfsberger AC	Permanent	N/A	
21 July 2022	MF	(Italy) Giuseppe Leone	Siena	Free transfer	N/A	
8 August 2022	DF	(Brazil) David Wesley	(Brazil) Cruzeiro	Permanent	N/A	
12 August 2022	DF	(Switzerland) Daniel Leo	Foggia	Loan	N/A	

== Player statistics ==
As of match played 22 January 2023

No.	Pos	Nat	Player	Total		Serie C		Coppa Italia Serie C	
No.	Pos	Nat	Player	Apps	Goals	Apps	Goals	Apps	Goals
Goalkeepers
1	GK	(Italy) ITA	Giovanni Garofani	10	0	9	0	1	0
12	GK	(Italy) ITA	Marco Raina	14	0	10	0	4	0
22	GK	(Italy) ITA	Giovanni Daffara	0	0	0	0	0	0
34	GK	(Italy) ITA	Leonardo Ratti	0	0	0	0	0	0
35	GK	(Italy) ITA	Simone Scaglia	0	0	0	0	0	0
55	GK	(Hungary) HUN	Zsombor Senkó	4	0	4	0	0	0
Defenders
2	DF	(Italy) ITA	Nicolò Savona	7	0	4+2	0	0+1	0
3	DF	(Italy) ITA	Diego Stramaccioni	13	0	9+3	0	1	0
4	DF	(Bosnia and Herzegovina) BIH	Tarik Muharemović	13	1	5+5	1	3	0
5	DF	(France) FRA	Félix Nzouango	10	0	4+5	0	1	0
6	DF	(Italy) ITA	Alessandro Pio Riccio	17	0	13	0	4	0
13	DF	(Italy) ITA	Fabrizio Poli	15	2	12+1	1	1+1	1
14	DF	(Italy) ITA	Gabriele Mulazzi	19	0	10+6	0	3	0
15	DF	(Italy) ITA	Giuseppe Verduci	7	1	5	0	2	1
23	DF	(France) FRA	Jean-Claude Ntenda	2	0	1+1	0	0	0
26	DF	(Italy) ITA	Tommaso Barbieri	19	0	15+1	0	3	0
32	DF	(Italy) ITA	Riccardo Turicchia	14	0	7+4	0	1+2	0
33	DF	(Italy) ITA	Alessandro Citi	0	0	0	0	0	0
42	DF	(Netherlands) NED	Dean Huijsen	4	0	3	0	1	0
Midfielders
8	MF	(Italy) ITA	Emanuele Zuelli	13	0	6+5	0	0+2	0
16	MF	(England) ENG	Samuel Iling-Junior	7	4	5+1	3	1	1
17	MF	(Italy) ITA	Andrea Bonetti	4	0	2+2	0	0	0
18	MF	(Tunisia) TUN	Hamza Rafia	15	2	9+5	2	0+1	0
20	MF	(Italy) ITA	Simone Iocolano	23	4	12+5	3	4+2	1
24	MF	(Norway) NOR	Martin Palumbo	16	1	10+3	1	2+1	0
27	MF	(Italy) ITA	Michele Besaggio	23	2	14+6	2	2+1	0
28	MF	(Argentina) ARG	Enzo Barrenechea	22	3	18+1	3	2+1	0
30	MF	(Italy) ITA	Alessandro Sersanti	20	2	13+4	1	3	1
Forwards
7	FW	(Italy) ITA	Nikola Sekulov	18	3	6+8	2	3+1	1
9	FW	(Italy) ITA	Marco Da Graca	16	1	6+7	0	2+1	1
10	FW	(Italy) ITA	Mattia Compagnon	20	5	11+5	4	2+2	1
11	FW	(Italy) ITA	Nicolò Cudrig	20	3	10+7	2	2+1	1
19	FW	(Switzerland) SUI	Yannick Cotter	0	0	0	0	0	0
21	FW	(Italy) ITA	Mirco Lipari	8	1	1+4	0	0+3	1
23	FW	(France) FRA	Marley Aké	4	0	3	0	1	0
25	FW	(Italy) ITA	Leonardo Cerri	11	1	2+7	0	1+1	1
29	FW	(Argentina) ARG	Matías Soulé	3	0	2	0	1	0
31	FW	(Italy) ITA	Emanuele Pecorino	20	2	14+3	2	2+1	0
39	FW	(Italy) ITA	Tommaso Mancini	3	0	1+1	0	0+1	0
40	FW	(Turkey) TUR	Kenan Yıldız	1	0	0+1	0	0	0
