= Stramaccioni =

Stramaccioni is an Italian surname. Notable people with the surname include:

- Andrea Stramaccioni (born 1976), Italian association football manager
- Diego Stramaccioni (born 2001), Italian association football defender
