= Verduci =

Verduci is an Italian surname. Notable people with the surname include:

- Carmine Verduci (1959–2014), Italian mobster
- Giuseppe Verduci (born 2002), Italian footballer
- Rocco Verduci (1824–1847), Italian revolutionary

== See also ==
- Verducci
