= Samuel Iling-Junior =

English footballer (born 2003)

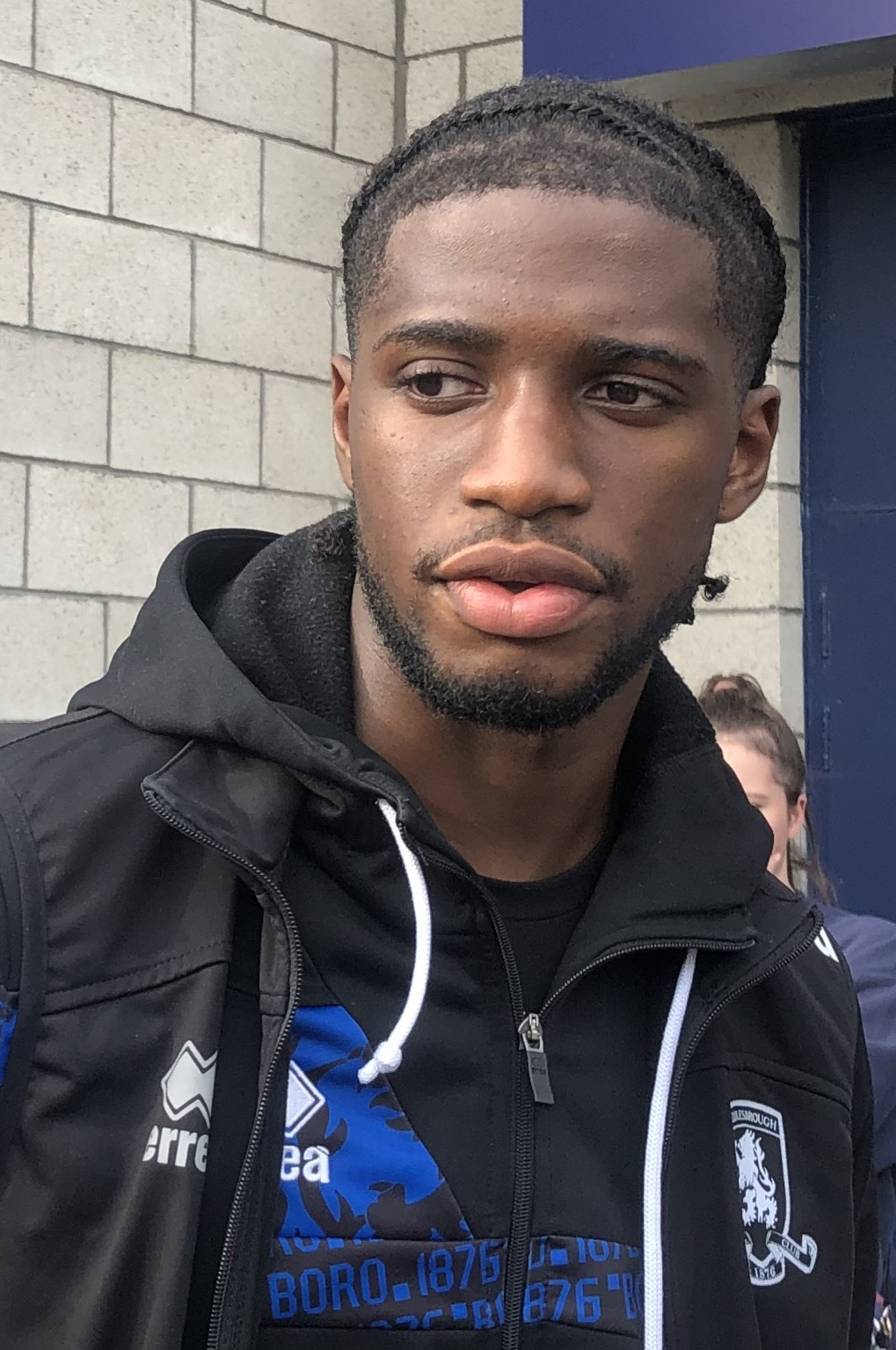
- Iling-Junior with Middlesbrough in 2025

Personal information
- Full name: Samuel Iling-Junior
- Date of birth: 4 October 2003 (age 23)
- Place of birth: Islington, England
- Height: 1.82 m (6 ft 0 in)
- Positions: Winger; wing-back

Team information
- Current team: Bolton Wanderers (on loan from Aston Villa)
- Number: 16

Youth career
- 2011–2020: Chelsea
- 2020–2021: Juventus

Senior career*
Years	Team	Apps	(Gls)
2021–2023	Juventus Next Gen (Note: The team's name was changed from Juventus U23 to Juventus Next Gen in August 2022.)	9	(3)
2022–2024	Juventus	36	(2)
2024–	Aston Villa	0	(0)
2024–2025	→ Bologna (loan)	7	(1)
2025	→ Middlesbrough (loan)	16	(1)
2025–2026	→ West Bromwich Albion (loan)	24	(1)
2026	→ Pisa (loan)	5	(0)
2026–	→ Bolton Wanderers (loan)	10	(0)

International career^{‡}
2018	England U15	1	(0)
2018–2019	England U16	8	(0)
2019	England U17	5	(0)
2021–2022	England U19	7	(1)
2022–2023	England U20	6	(2)
2023–2025	England U21	16	(2)
Medal record
Men's football
Representing England
UEFA European Under-21 Championship
Winner	2025 Slovakia
UEFA European Under-19 Championship
Winner	2022 Slovakia
- * Club domestic league appearances and goals as of 09:20, 14 October 2026 (UTC) ‡ National team caps and goals as of 19:18, 29 June 2025 (UTC)

Samuel Iling-Junior (born 4 October 2003) is an English professional footballer who plays as a winger or wing-back for EFL Championship club Bolton Wanderers, on loan from Premier League club Aston Villa.

A youth product of Chelsea and Juventus, Iling-Junior made his debut for reserve team Juventus U23 in the 2021–22 season, while also reaching the UEFA Youth League semi-finals with the U19 squad. In the following campaign, Iling-Junior started with Juventus Next Gen, scoring four goals in seven matches, and then was promoted to the first team in December 2022, after making his debut both in Serie A and Champions League.

Iling-Junior has represented England at various youth international levels, having won a UEFA European Under-19 Championship in 2022 and UEFA European Under-21 Championship in 2025.

== Club career ==
=== Early career ===
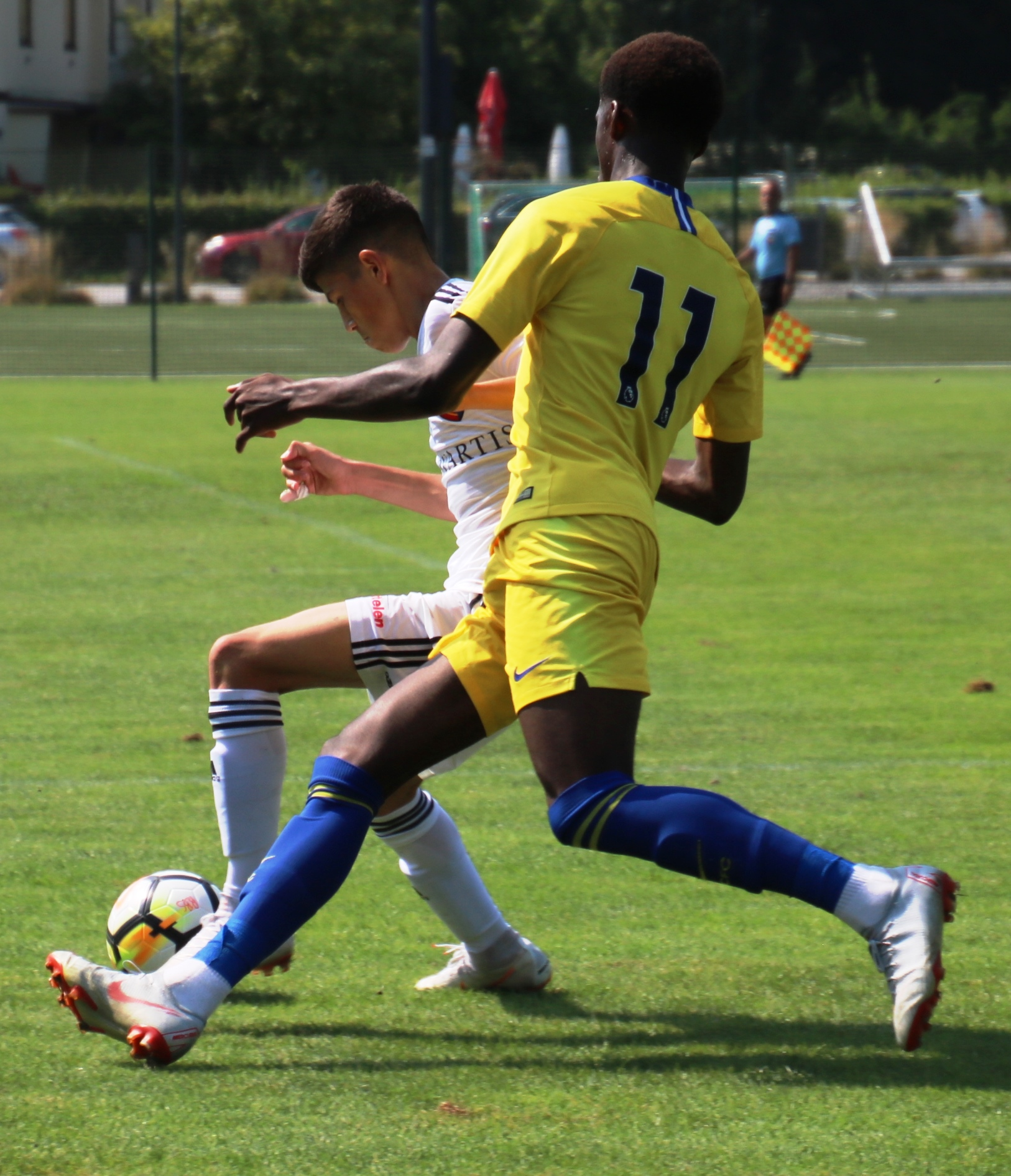
Iling-junior (Number 11) playing for Chelsea academy in 2018

Born in Islington, London, to Congolese parents, Iling-Junior joined Chelsea academy in 2011 at the age of eight, and spent nine years with the club. He attended secondary school at St Aloysius' College, Highgate. He was promoted to the under-19s aged 16. In 2020, he decided to leave Chelsea, rejecting an athletic scholarship deal, attracting interest from clubs such as Paris Saint-Germain, Bayern Munich, Borussia Dortmund and Juventus; he signed a three-year contract with the latter in September of that year.

=== Juventus ===
==== 2020–2022 ====
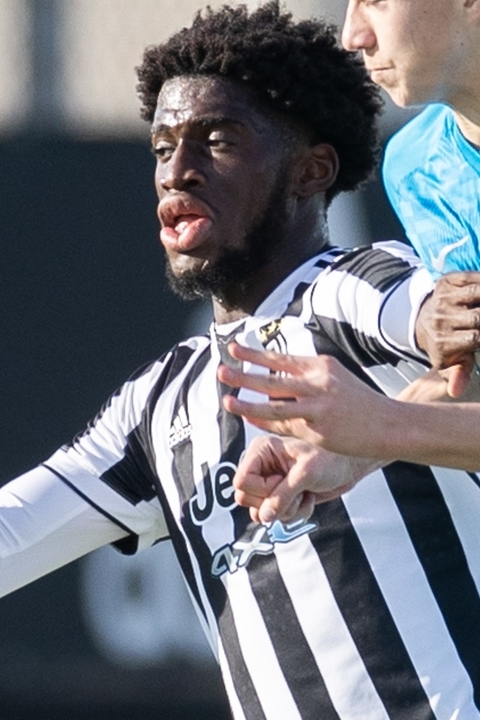
Iling-Junior with Juventus U19 in 2021

On 7 October 2020, Iling-Junior was included in The Guardian's list of the 60 best young talents in the world born in 2003. On 2 April 2021, he was first called up by Juventus U23 alongside his U19 teammate Gabriele Mulazzi for a Serie C match against Alessandria. He finished the 2020–21 season with four goals and seven assists in 28 matches for the under-19 team.

On 22 August, he made his debut for Juventus U23 in a 3–2 win against Pro Sesto in the Coppa Italia Serie C. His Serie C debut came on 3 October, replacing Nikola Sekulov in the second half against Mantova. Iling-Junior was first called up to the first team on 21 May 2022, for a match against Fiorentina.

In the 2021–22 season, he improved his stats, having played 36 matches and scored 13 goals. Iling-Junior also helped the U19s reach the UEFA Youth League semifinals, their best-ever placing in the competition.

==== 2022–2024 ====
Iling-Junior scored his first professional goal on 3 September 2022, in the 13th minute in Trento–Juventus Next Gen, their first season match. He made his Serie A debut for the first team in a match against Empoli, on 21 October, coming on as a substitute for Filip Kostić in the 84th minute.

On 25 October, Iling-Junior made his Champions League debut against Benfica, replacing Kostić in the 70th minute with Juventus trailing 4–1. He assisted Arkadiusz Milik's 4–2 goal after six minutes, and provided a key pass for Weston McKennie's goal two minutes later. Four days later, in an away match against Lecce, Iling-Junior assisted Nicolò Fagioli's winner after only 41 seconds from entering the pitch; however, he suffered a right-ankle sprain after being fouled by Federico Di Francesco, ruling him out for 20 days.

On 19 December, Juventus announced that Iling-Junior renewed his contract until 2025, being subsequently promoted to the first team. He was promoted after scoring four goals in nine matches for Next Gen (two of which were during the previous season). He made his first-minute debut with the first team on the 19th of the following month, in Juventus–Monza, in the Coppa Italia.

On 2 March 2023, Iling-Junior started the first leg of the final of the Coppa Italia Serie C with Juventus Next Gen and scored a 47th-minute equaliser against Vicenza, against whom they lost 2–1. On 11 April, he also played the second leg, in which he kicked a penalty he had won over the post at the 90th minute; they lost 3–2 (5–3 on aggregate). On 7 May, he made his first start in Serie A and scored his first goal with Juventus' first team, netting the opener in a 2–0 away win over Atalanta.

On 7 January 2024, Iling-Junior scored his first and only goal of the 2023–24 season in a 2–1 away league win over Salernitana.

=== Aston Villa ===
On 1 July 2024, Iling-Junior signed for Premier League club Aston Villa on a permanent deal, as part of a double-transfer from Juventus, alongside Enzo Barrenechea. The deal commanded a €14 million fee, plus €3 million in add-ons, and was related to the transfer of Douglas Luiz to Juventus, despite being a separate transaction.

==== Loans ====
On 27 August 2024, Iling-Junior joined Serie A club Bologna on a season-long loan. On 21 January 2025, he scored his first Champions League goal in a 2–1 victory over Borussia Dortmund, marking his club's maiden victory in the competition.

On 3 February 2025, Aston Villa recalled Iling-Junior from his Bologna loan and sent him out on loan to EFL Championship club Middlesbrough until the end of the season.

On 1 September 2025, Iling-Junior joined West Bromwich Albion on a season-long loan.

On 2 February 2026, Aston Villa recalled Iling-Junior from West Brom, and he signed with Pisa until the end of the season.

On 14 August 2026, Iling-Junior joined newly promoted Championship club Bolton Wanderers on a season-long loan deal.

== International career ==
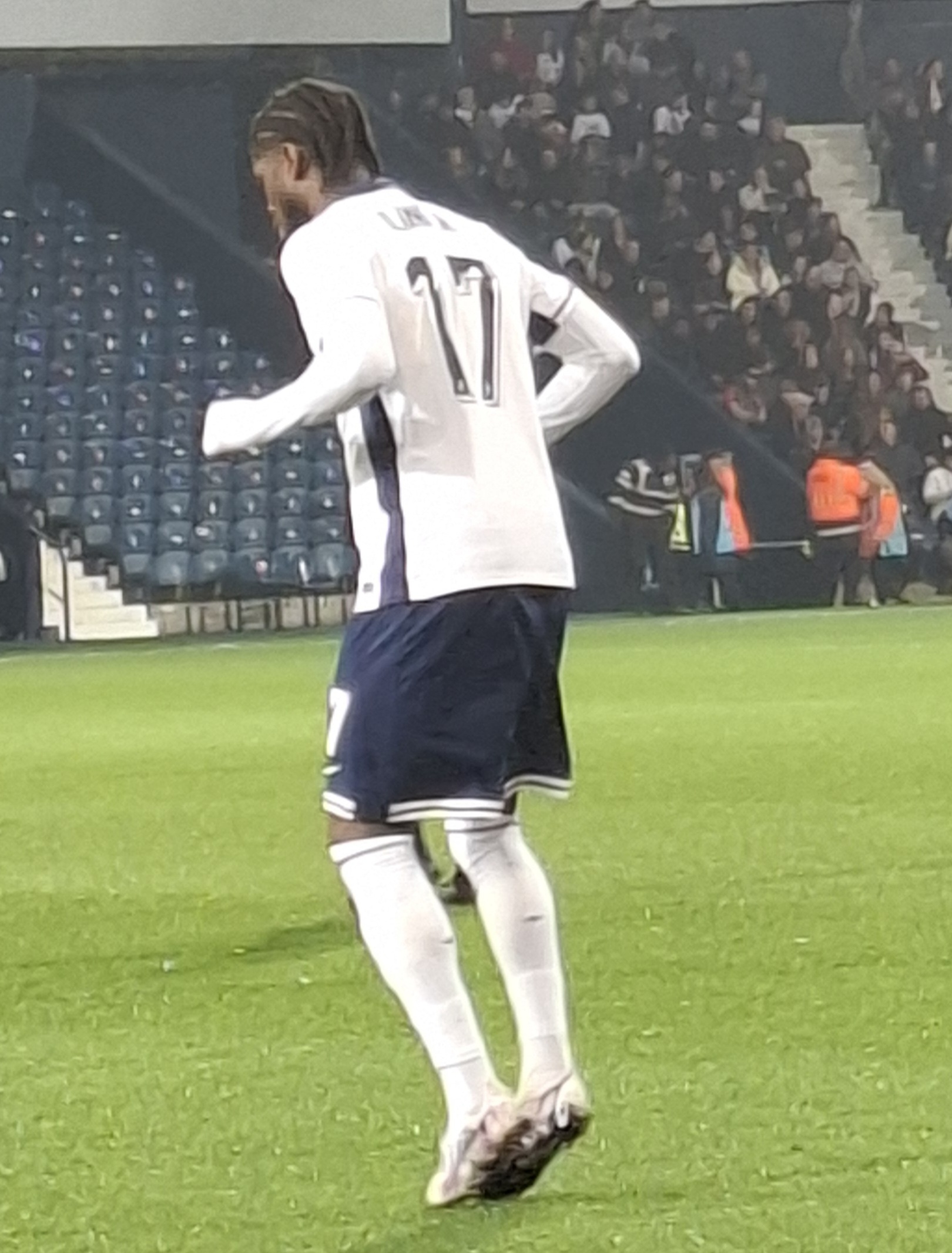
Iling-Junior playing for England U21 in 2025

Born in England, Iling-Junior is of DR Congolese descent. He was a member of the England U17s' 2019 Syrenka Cup-winning squad.

On 6 October 2021, Iling-Junior made his debut for the England U19s as a substitute during a 3–1 defeat to France in Marbella, Spain. He was included in the England U19 squad for the 2022 UEFA European Under-19 Championship and played in their opening group stage game against Austria. Iling-Junior was an unused substitute in the final which England won with a 3–1 extra-time victory over Israel on 1 July.

On 21 September 2022, Iling-Junior made his England U20 debut in a 3–0 win over Chile at the Pinatar Arena in Spain. On 24 March 2023, he scored a brace in England U20's 2–0 win over Germany U20. Iling-Junior was unable to attend the 2023 FIFA U-20 World Cup due to club commitments.

On 11 September 2023, Iling-Junior made his England U21 debut in a 3–0 win away to Luxembourg in a 2025 UEFA European Under-21 Championship qualifying match. In March 2024 he scored two goals in a qualifier against Luxembourg at Toughsheet Community Stadium. Iling-Junior was included in their squad for the 2025 UEFA European Under-21 Championship and made an appearance off the bench as a substitute during extra time in the final as England defeated Germany 3–2 to win the tournament.

== Style of play ==
Iling-Junior mainly plays as a winger, either on the left or right. His versatility allowed him to be deployed various areas of the pitch by Juventus U19 coach Andrea Bonatti, namely as a left-back, left or right forward, attacking midfielder or central midfielder. His main qualities are his goalscoring, dribbling and running abilities.

== Personal life ==
Iling-Junior moved to Italy during the COVID-19 pandemic, which he found challenging. He has since become nearly fluent in Italian.

== Career statistics ==
=== Club ===
As of match played 13 October 2026

Appearances and goals by club, season and competition
Club	Season	League			National cup (Note: Includes Coppa Italia)		League cup		Europe		Other		Total	
Club	Season	Division	Apps	Goals	Apps	Goals	Apps	Goals	Apps	Goals	Apps	Goals	Apps	Goals
Juventus U23	2021–22	Serie C	1	0	—		—		—		1 (Note: Appearance(s) in Coppa Italia Serie C)	0	2	0
Juventus Next Gen	2022–23	Serie C	8	3	—		—		—		3	2	11	5
Juventus Next Gen	Total		9	3	—		—		—		4	2	13	5
Juventus	2022–23	Serie A	12	1	1	0	—		5 (Note: One appearance in UEFA Champions League, four appearances in UEFA Europa League)	0	—		18	1
Juventus	2023–24	Serie A	24	1	3	0	—		—		—		27	1
Juventus	Total		36	2	4	0	—		5	0	—		45	2
Aston Villa	2024–25	Premier League	0	0	—		—		—		—		0	0
Aston Villa	2025–26	Premier League	0	0	—		—		—		—		0	0
Aston Villa	2026–27	Premier League	0	0	0	0	0	0	0	0	—		0	0
Aston Villa	Total		0	0	0	0	0	0	0	0	0	0	0	0
Bologna (loan)	2024–25	Serie A	7	1	1	0	—		8 (Note: Appearances in UEFA Champions League)	1	—		16	2
Middlesbrough (loan)	2024–25	Championship	16	1	—		—		—		—		16	1
West Bromwich Albion (loan)	2025–26	Championship	24	1	0	0	—		—		—		24	1
Pisa (loan)	2025–26	Serie A	5	0	—		—		—		—		5	0
Bolton Wanderers (loan)	2026–27	Championship	10	0	0	0	—		—		—		10	0
Career total			107	8	5	0	0	0	13	1	4	2	129	11

== Honours ==
Juventus Next Gen

- Coppa Italia Serie C runner-up: 2022–23

Juventus

- Coppa Italia: 2023–24

England U19

- UEFA European Under-19 Championship: 2022

England U21

- UEFA European Under-21 Championship: 2025
