= Pirola (surname) =

Pirola is a surname. Notable people with the name include:

- Davide Pirola (born 2001), Italian footballer
- Lorenzo Pirola (born 2002), Italian footballer
- Luiz Alberto Pirola (born 1954), Brazilian footballer
- Romano Pirola, Australian pancreatology researcher and gastroenterologist

== See also ==
- Pirola (disambiguation)
