= Fabio Miretti =

Italian footballer (born 2003)

- Miretti in 2026

Personal information
- Date of birth: 3 August 2003 (age 23)
- Place of birth: Pinerolo, Italy
- Height: 1.80 m (5 ft 11 in)
- Position: Midfielder

Team information
- Current team: Beşiktaş (on loan from Juventus)
- Number: 21

Youth career
- 2007–2008: Auxilium Saluzzo
- 2008–2011: Cuneo
- 2011–2021: Juventus

Senior career*
| Years | Team | Apps | (Gls) |
| 2021–2022 | Juventus U23 | 30 | (3) |
| 2021– | Juventus | 81 | (2) |
| 2024–2025 | → Genoa (loan) | 25 | (3) |
| 2026– | → Beşiktaş (loan) | 5 | (0) |

International career^{‡}
| 2018 | Italy U15 | 2 | (0) |
| 2018–2019 | Italy U16 | 12 | (2) |
| 2019–2020 | Italy U17 | 6 | (2) |
| 2021–2022 | Italy U19 | 13 | (5) |
| 2022– | Italy U21 | 10 | (1) |
| 2022– | Italy | 1 | (0) |
- * Club domestic league appearances and goals as of 23:16, 22 November 2026 (UTC) ‡ National team caps and goals as of 15 November 2024

Fabio Miretti (born 3 August 2003) is an Italian professional footballer who plays as a midfielder for Süper Lig club Beşiktaş, on loan from Serie A club Juventus, and the Italy national team.

Miretti joined Auxilium Saluzzo's youth setup in 2007 and moved on to Cuneo's the following year. In 2011, Miretti was bought by Juventus with which he played across its youth levels. In February 2021, he made his professional debut with the under-23 team, aged 17. The following season, he became a Juventus U23 regular, before making his Serie A and UEFA Champions League debuts with the first team and helping the under-19 team reach the UEFA Youth League semi-finals. In the 2022–23 season, Miretti was permanently promoted to the first team.

Miretti has also represented Italy at youth levels since 2018. He has since scored nine goals in 40 appearances across Italy's levels. In 2022, he made his debut for the senior team.

== Club career ==
=== Juventus ===
==== Early career ====
Miretti started playing football at Auxilium Saluzzo's youth sector at the age of four. One year later, his talent was recognised by scout Ermanno Demaria, and he was acquired by the Cuneo's Youth Team, with which he played their friendlies with children one year older, signing his first contract in 2010. The following year, he joined the Juventus Youth Sector after being reported by sporting observer Santo Borza and after training with Juventus and Torino. He preferred to play for Juventus, as they offered him a shuttle bus to the training ground. By the time he turned 11, he had scored 177 goals for the Pulcini side. Miretti scored 16 goals in 17 appearances with the under-17s in the 2019–20 season, subsequently suspended due to the COVID-19 pandemic in Italy. In October 2020, Miretti was included in The Guardian's list of the 60 best talents in the world born in 2003. On 13 February 2021, he made his professional debut with Serie C side Juventus U23 – the reserve team of Juventus – in a 3–0 away win against AlbinoLeffe, at his first call up. He spent the whole 2020–21 season playing for the Primavera (under-19s) side, with the addition of four substitute appearances with the under-23s.

==== 2021–22 season: Development and breakthrough ====
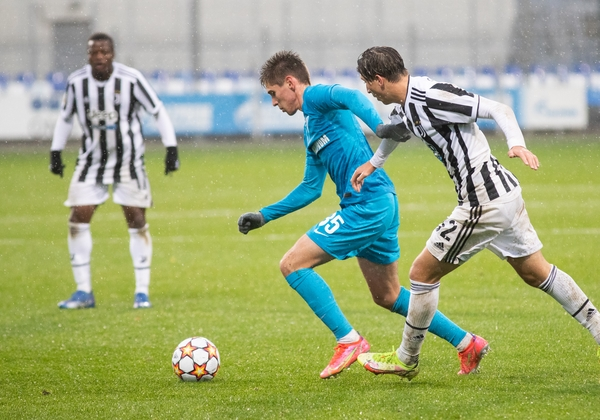
Miretti (right) in action with Juventus U19 in 2021

Miretti began the 2021–22 season by taking part in Juventus' pre-season friendlies. In August, he was given the number 21 jersey for Juventus U23. For the under-23s, he converted his 108th-minute penalty in a 3–2 Coppa Italia Serie C win against Pro Sesto at the opener of the season on 22 August, allowing his team to enter the further round. Six days after, he scored his first Serie C goal, the opener from the edge of the box of Juventus U23's away match against Pergolettese, eventually won 2–1. On 10 September, Miretti received his first call up by the first team, by coach Massimiliano Allegri, alongside his U23 teammates Koni De Winter and Matías Soulé for the Serie A match against Napoli of the following day. He captained the U23s in a 3–2 Coppa Italia Serie C win against Feralpisalò on 15 September. His Juventus first-team debut came on 8 December, in a 1–0 UEFA Champions League home win against Malmö FF, coming on as substitute in the 89th minute. In the post-match interview, he said: "[It] was an incredible emotion. The dream of every kid who comes to Juve[ntus]' youth sector is to make his debut in front of his own fans and in his own stadium. [It] was an emotion never felt before". Five days later, he scored an 86th-minute decider in Juventus U23's 2–1 comeback to Trento after his team had suffered three defeats in a row. On 31 December, he was awarded Best Youth Player of the first half of the Serie C season.

"[He]'s a boy who knows the football and [he's] ready to stay among the big [ones]."

— Juventus coach Massimiliano Allegri on Miretti, 1 May 2022

On 20 January 2022, Miretti renewed his contract with Juventus until 2026. He played his first Serie A match on 20 March, replacing Juan Cuadrado in stoppage time in a home 2–0 win against Salernitana. Additionally, in this match, many Juventus fans criticised Allegri on social media for preferring to adapt full-back Danilo as a midfielder instead of deploying Miretti as a starter against a newly promoted team. After another late substitute appearance against Sassuolo, his debut as a starter in Serie A and with the first team was on 1 May, in a match against Venezia at home won 2–1, becoming the first Juventus player born after 2002 to start a match. He was decisive in the actions of the two goals scored by Leonardo Bonucci, having taken the free kick and the corner kick which led Bonucci to score his goals. His match ended at the 78th minute, when he was replaced by Arthur Melo, receiving a standing ovation from the stadium.

The 2021–22 season, saw him play 29 matches and score four goals for the under-23s. With the first team, Miretti played six matches (including four as a starter) and he made 16 bench appearances. Throughout the season, he also played some UEFA Youth League matches with Juventus U19. He scored two goals in five appearances for the U19s who were eliminated in the semi-finals, their best-ever placing in the competition.

==== 2022–2024: Permanent promotion to the first team ====
In August 2022, Miretti was given the number 20 jersey for Juventus, and was promoted to the first team permanently. On 31 August, he assisted Arkadiusz Milik's 2–0 goal against Spezia, becoming the first player born after 2002 to provide an assist in Serie A. He made his UEFA Champions League debut as a starter on 6 September in a match against Paris Saint-Germain at 19 years and 34 days old, becoming the second-youngest Juventus player to be a starter in a UEFA competition (behind Stefano Pioli at 18 years and 335 days old in September 1984). However, after being yellow carded in the late first half, he was substituted by Weston McKennie during the half-time break. His first season as a first-team player saw him play 40 matches in all competitions. On 20 July 2023, he renewed with Juventus until 2027. He scored the first goal in Serie A on 5 November, the winner of Fiorentina–Juventus.

==== 2024–present: Loan to Genoa and Beşiktaş ====
On 25 August 2024, Miretti joined fellow Serie A club Genoa on a season-long loan without a buy option. On 28 August 2026, Miretti joined Süper Lig club Beşiktaş on loan with an option to buy for €13 million.

== International career ==
Miretti represented Italy internationally at under-15, under-16, under-17, under-19, under-21 and senior levels. He debuted with the under-19s on 13 August 2021, in a match against Albania won 1–0. Two months later, on 6 October, Miretti scored a goal against Lithuania, his first with Italy U19. He was called up for the Elite Round of the 2022 UEFA European Under-19 Championship qualification which took place in Finland against Germany, Finland and Belgium; he scored one goal against Finland and Belgium, helping Italy qualify to the tournament.

On 25 May 2022, Miretti was called up by Italy's coach Roberto Mancini for a training camp in Coverciano after Pietro Pellegri's injury. He debuted for Italy U21 on 6 June in a 3–0 victory against Luxembourg in the 2023 UEFA European Under-21 Championship qualifiers, playing the entire match and providing a 54th-minute assist to Gianluca Gaetano, who made it 3–0. He took part in the 2022 UEFA European Under-19 Championship, with the Italy U19. He missed Italy U19's debut against Romania due to a ban. On 21 June, he played the second match of the group stage, giving an assist to Giuseppe Ambrosino to beat Slovakia 1–0. Seven days later, they lost 2–1 the semi-final against England, to whom he scored the opener from a penalty. The Spanish newspaper Marca inserted him among the best ten players of the tournament.

On 20 November, aged 19, he made his Italy senior debut as a late substitute for Nicolò Barella in a friendly match lost against Austria in Vienna.

== Style of play ==
Starting his career as a central midfielder, Miretti moved up the pitch with time and became a trequartista through his eye for the goal. During his year at the under-19s, Miretti changed his position in the field, becoming a mezz'ala due to the absence of a trequartista in his coaches' modules. The website Numero Diez described him as a flexible, technical and dynamic midfielder who features excellent vision, precision, speed of thought and ball control, who can also use his weak foot. Goal.com and TUTTOmercatoWEB added that his qualities were also dribbling and passing, shooting, eye for the goal and insertion which allow him to set up his teammates with assists. He was also likened to former Juventus midfielder Claudio Marchisio by Goal.com for his qualities as a finisher and for his career across Juventus' youth levels.

== Personal life ==
Miretti was born in Pinerolo on 3 August 2003, but he is originally from Saluzzo. He has a girlfriend called India and has a sister called Alessia. He also likes basketball player James Harden. His idol is former Juventus' midfielder Pavel Nedvěd and his reference point is Manchester City's Kevin De Bruyne for his role and characteristics. He has been a Juventus supporter since his childhood. He attended Juventus in-house Liceo Scientifico con indrizzo sportivo (Scientific high school with sports focus). On 12 July 2022, Juventus announced that Miretti had passed his school-leaving examination.

== Career statistics ==
=== Club ===
As of match played 22 October 2026

Appearances and goals by club, season and competition
| Club | Season | League | | | Coppa Italia | | Europe | | Other | | Total | |
| Club | Season | Division | Apps | Goals | Apps | Goals | Apps | Goals | Apps | Goals | Apps | Goals |
|---|---|---|---|---|---|---|---|---|---|---|---|---|
| Juventus U23 | 2020–21 | Serie C | 4 | 0 | — | | — | | 0 | 0 | 4 | 0 |
| Juventus U23 | 2021–22 | Serie C | 26 | 3 | — | | — | | 3 (Note: Appearances in Coppa Italia Serie C) | 1 | 29 | 4 |
| Juventus U23 | Total | | 30 | 3 | — | | — | | 3 | 1 | 33 | 4 |
| Juventus | 2021–22 | Serie A | 6 | 0 | 0 | 0 | 1 (Note: Appearance in UEFA Champions League) | 0 | 0 | 0 | 7 | 0 |
| Juventus | 2022–23 | Serie A | 27 | 0 | 4 | 0 | 9 (Note: Five appearances in UEFA Champions League, four appearances in UEFA Europa League) | 0 | — | | 40 | 0 |
| Juventus | 2023–24 | Serie A | 25 | 1 | 3 | 1 | — | | — | | 28 | 2 |
| Juventus | 2025–26 | Serie A | 23 | 1 | 1 | 0 | 7 | 0 | — | | 31 | 1 |
| Juventus | Total | | 81 | 2 | 8 | 1 | 17 | 0 | 0 | 0 | 106 | 3 |
| Genoa (loan) | 2024–25 | Serie A | 25 | 3 | 1 | 0 | — | | — | | 26 | 3 |
| Beşiktaş (loan) | 2026–27 | Süper Lig | 4 | 0 | 0 | 0 | 3 (Note: Appearances in UEFA Europa League) | 0 | — | | 7 | 0 |
| Career total | | | 140 | 8 | 9 | 1 | 20 | 0 | 3 | 1 | 172 | 10 |

=== International ===
As of match played 28 June 2023

Appearances and goals by national team and year
| National team | Year | Apps | Goals |
|---|---|---|---|
| Italy U15 | 2018 | 2 | 0 |
| Italy U16 | 2018 | 6 | 2 |
| Italy U16 | 2019 | 6 | 0 |
| Italy U16 | Total | 12 | 2 |
| Italy U17 | 2019 | 5 | 2 |
| Italy U17 | 2020 | 1 | 0 |
| Italy U17 | Total | 6 | 2 |
| Italy U19 | 2021 | 6 | 1 |
| Italy U19 | 2022 | 7 | 4 |
| Italy U19 | Total | 13 | 5 |
| Italy U21 | 2022 | 3 | 0 |
| Italy U21 | 2023 | 2 | 0 |
| Italy U21 | Total | 5 | 0 |
| Italy | 2022 | 1 | 0 |
| Career total | | 40 | 9 |

== Honours ==
Juventus

- Coppa Italia: 2023–24; runner-up: 2021–22

Individual

- Italian Golden boy: 2022;
- Best Youth Player of the first half of the Serie C season.
