= Anzolin =

Anzolin is a surname. Notable people with the surname include:

- Roberto Anzolin (1938–2017), Italian footballer
- Matteo Anzolin (born 2000), Italian footballer
