= Mirco Lipari =

Italian footballer (born 2002)

Personal information
- Date of birth: 19 July 2002 (age 24)
- Place of birth: Cecina, Italy
- Height: 1.78 m (5 ft 10 in)
- Position: Forward

Team information
- Current team: Siena
- Number: 8

Youth career
- Polisportiva Palazzaccio
- Sporting Cecina
- –2018: Empoli
- 2018–2021: Juventus
- 2019–2020: → Empoli (loan)
- 2020–2021: → Empoli (loan)

Senior career*
Years	Team	Apps	(Gls)
2021–2024	Juventus	0	(0)
2021–2022	→ Juve Stabia	7	(0)
2022–2023	→ Juventus Next Gen (Note: The team's name was changed from Juventus U23 to Juventus Next Gen in August 2022.) (res.)	11	(0)
2023–2024	→ Recanatese (loan)	28	(5)
2024–2025	Lumezzane	7	(0)
2025	→ Pontedera (loan)	12	(2)
2025–	Siena	32	(12)

International career^{‡}
2017	Italy U15	5	(0)
2017–2018	Italy U16	9	(1)
2018	Italy U17	1	(1)
- * Club domestic league appearances and goals as of 3 May 2026 ‡ National team caps and goals as of 19:49, 19 March 2022 (UTC)

Mirco Lipari (born 19 July 2002) is an Italian professional footballer who plays as forward for Serie D club Siena.

== Club career ==
=== Youth ===
Lipari started his youth career at Polisportiva Palazzaccio and Cecina, before moving to Empoli. In 2018, Lipari joined Juventus, starting his experience with the under-16s with whom he scored 20 goals in 24 appearances. He returned to Empoli on loan in 2019, playing with the Primavera (under-19s); he scored 16 goals and made five assists in 42 appearances in two years and won the league in 2021.

=== Senior ===
On 25 August 2021, Lipari moved to Juve Stabia on loan. Lipari only made seven appearances with them, before his loan was interrupted on 27 January 2022. Lipari debuted with Juventus U23 — the reserve team of Juventus — on 16 March in a 2–1 defeat against Lecco. On 4 September 2023, Lipari was loaned by Recanatese.

On 10 July 2024, Lipari signed a two-season contract with Lumezzane.

== International career ==
Lipari has represented Italy at under-15, under-16 and under-17.

== Style of play ==
Lipari is a versatile offensive player who can play as left forward.

== Career statistics ==
As of match played 16 April 2023

Appearances and goals by club, season and competition
Club	Season	League			Coppa Italia		Other		Total	
Club	Season	Division	Apps	Goals	Apps	Goals	Apps	Goals	Apps	Goals
Juve Stabia (loan)	2021–22	Serie C	7	0	—		0	0	7	0
Juventus Next Gen	2021–22	Serie C	2	0	—		1 (Note: Appearance in Serie C promotion play-offs)	0	3	0
Juventus Next Gen	2022–23	Serie C	11	0	—		3 (Note: Appearance in Coppa Italia Serie C)	1	14	1
Juventus Next Gen	Total		13	0	0	0	4	1	17	1
Career total			20	0	0	0	4	1	24	1
