= Denis Caverzasi =

Italian professional football player (born 1994)

Personal information
- Date of birth: 9 August 1994 (age 32)
- Place of birth: Como, Italy
- Height: 1.84 m (6 ft 0 in)
- Position: Defender

Team information
- Current team: Varesina Calcio

Youth career
- 2011–2013: Varese

Senior career*
Years	Team	Apps	(Gls)
2013–2016	Caronnese	66	(4)
2016–2019	Monza	48	(1)
2019	Renate	10	(0)
2019–2024	Pro Sesto	86	(4)
2024–	Varesina Calcio	0	(0)
- * Club domestic league appearances and goals as of 3 May 2024

Denis Caverzasi (born 9 August 1994) is an Italian professional footballer who plays as a defender for club Varesina Calcio.

== Club career ==
On 12 January 2019, he signed with Renate.

On 20 August 2019, he moved to Serie D club Pro Sesto.

== Honours ==
=== Club ===
Monza

- Serie D: 2016-17
- Scudetto Dilettanti: 2016-17
