= Tommaso Barbieri =

Italian footballer (born 2002)

Personal information
- Full name: Tommaso Barbieri
- Date of birth: 26 August 2002 (age 24)
- Place of birth: Magenta, Italy
- Height: 1.81 m (5 ft 11 in)
- Position: Right-back

Team information
- Current team: Cremonese
- Number: 4

Senior career*
Years	Team	Apps	(Gls)
2019–2020	Novara	13	(1)
2020–2024	Juventus Next Gen (Note: The team's name was changed from Juventus U23 to Juventus Next Gen in August 2022.)	61	(0)
2022–2024	Juventus	4	(0)
2023–2024	→ Pisa (loan)	31	(3)
2024–	Cremonese	60	(3)

International career^{‡}
2019	Italy U17	3	(0)
2020	Italy U18	2	(0)
2021–2022	Italy U20	5	(0)
- * Club domestic league appearances and goals as of 25 May 2026 ‡ National team caps and goals as of 7 June 2022

Tommaso Barbieri (born 26 August 2002) is an Italian professional footballer who plays as a right-back for Serie A club Cremonese.

== Club career ==
On 11 September 2020, Barbieri joined Serie C side Juventus U23, the reserve team of Juventus, on a five-year contract. On 28 September, Barbieri made his debut for Juventus U23 in a 2–1 victory against Pro Sesto.

On 16 April 2023, he made his Serie A debut for the first team in a match against Sassuolo.

On 20 July 2023, Barbieri was loaned by Serie B club Pisa.

On 6 August 2024, Cremonese announced his arrival, specifying that Barbieri had signed a contract valid until 30 June 2028 with the grey-red club.

== Career statistics ==
As of match played 22 May 2023

Club	Season	League			Coppa Italia		Other		Total	
Club	Season	Division	Apps	Goals	Apps	Goals	Apps	Goals	Apps	Goals
Novara	2019–20	Serie C	13	1	1	0	4 (Note: Appearances in Serie C promotion play-offs)	0	18	1
Juventus Next Gen	2020–21	Serie C	15	0	—		0	0	15	0
Juventus Next Gen	2021–22	Serie C	26	0	—		4 (Note: Two appearances in Coppa Italia Serie C, two appearances in Serie C promotion play-offs)	0	30	0
Juventus Next Gen	2022–23	Serie C	19	0	—		5 (Note: Appearance in Coppa Italia Serie C)	0	24	0
Juventus Next Gen	Total		60	0	0	0	9	0	69	0
Juventus	2022–23	Serie A	3	0	0	0	1 (Note: Appearance in UEFA Champions League)	0	4	0
Career total			63	1	1	0	12	0	75	1
