= Nicolò Cudrig =

Italian footballer (born 2002)

Personal information
- Date of birth: 7 August 2002 (age 24)
- Place of birth: Udine, Italy
- Height: 1.85 m (6 ft 1 in)
- Position: Forward

Team information
- Current team: Carrarese (on loan from Juventus Next Gen)
- Number: 70

Youth career
- –2018: Udinese
- 2018–2021: Monaco
- 2018–2019: → Cercle Brugge (loan)

Senior career*
| Years | Team | Apps | (Gls) |
| 2021– | Juventus Next Gen (Note: The team's name was changed from Juventus U23 to Juventus Next Gen in August 2022.) | 109 | (7) |
| 2023–2024 | → Perugia (loan) | 26 | (0) |
| 2026– | → Carrarese (loan) | 3 | (0) |

International career^{‡}
| 2017 | Italy U15 | 1 | (0) |
| 2018 | Italy U16 | 7 | (2) |
| 2018–2019 | Italy U17 | 18 | (8) |
| 2019–2020 | Italy U18 | 7 | (2) |
| 2021 | Italy U20 | 4 | (0) |
Medal record
Men's football
Representing Italy
UEFA European Under-17 Championship
| Silver medal – second place | 2019 Republic of Ireland |
- * Club domestic league appearances and goals as of 19 September 2026 ‡ National team caps and goals as of 09:51, 13 November 2022 (UTC)

Nicolò Cudrig (born 7 August 2002) is an Italian professional footballer who plays as forward for Serie B club Carrarese on loan from Juventus Next Gen.

== Career ==
=== Early career ===
Cudrig started playing youth football for Udinese. On 31 July 2018, Cudrig moved to Monaco. The following day, Cudrig joined Cercle Brugge on a one-year loan.

=== Juventus U23 ===
On 29 July 2021, Cudrig moved to Juventus U23s — the reserve team of Juventus. He made his debut on 22 August 2021, in a 3–2 win against Pro Sesto, and scored to make it 2–2 in the 41st minute. On 24 October, Cudrig missed a penalty in a 1–1 draw against Pro Sesto in the 24th minute. On 20 February 2022, Cudrig scored his first Serie C goal in a 2–2 draw with Seregno. In the new season, on 9 September, he scored a 94th-minute equaliser through a header from a corner kick.

==== Loan to Perugia ====
On 30 August 2023, he joined Perugia on a season-long loan.

== International career ==
Cudrig represented Italy internationally at under-15, under-16, under-17, under-18 and under-20 levels.

== Career statistics ==
=== Club ===
As of match played 22 April 2023

Appearances and goals by club, season and competition
| Club | Season | League | | | Coppa Italia | | Other | | Total | |
| Club | Season | Division | Apps | Goals | Apps | Goals | Apps | Goals | Apps | Goals |
|---|---|---|---|---|---|---|---|---|---|---|
| Juventus Next Gen | 2021–22 | Serie C | 31 | 2 | — | | 9 (Note: Three appearances one goal in Coppa Italia Serie C, six appearances in Serie C promotion play-offs) | 1 | 40 | 3 |
| Juventus Next Gen | 2022–23 | Serie C | 31 | 3 | — | | 3 (Note: Appearances in Coppa Italia Serie C) | 1 | 35 | 4 |
| Juventus Next Gen | Total | | 62 | 5 | 0 | 0 | 12 | 1 | 75 | 7 |
| Career total | | | 62 | 5 | 0 | 0 | 12 | 1 | 75 | 7 |
