= Davide Zugaro =

Italian footballer (born 2000)

Personal information
- Full name: Davide Zugaro De Matteis
- Date of birth: 16 April 2000 (age 26)
- Place of birth: Pescara, Italy
- Height: 1.80 m (5 ft 11 in)
- Position: Left-back

Team information
- Current team: Ebolitana
- Number: 20

Youth career
- –2018: Pescara
- 2018–2019: Inter
- 2018–2019: → Pescara (loan)

Senior career*
Years	Team	Apps	(Gls)
2019–2023	Inter	0	(0)
2019–2020	→ Olbia (loan)	3	(0)
2020–2021	→ Giana Erminio (loan)	30	(1)
2021–2022	→ Virtus Verona (loan)	29	(1)
2022–2023	→ Sangiuliano City (loan)	29	(0)
2023	Notaresco	8	(0)
2023–2024	Bitonto	13	(0)
2024–2025	Paganese	28	(1)
2025–2026	Gelbison	15	(0)
2026	Heraclea	16	(0)
2026–	Ebolitana	0	(0)
- * Club domestic league appearances and goals as of 19 November 2026

Davide Zugaro De Matteis (born 16 April 2000) is an Italian footballer who plays as a left-back for Italian Serie D club Ebolitana.

== Club career ==
=== Internazionale ===
He played most of his youth career with Pescara. In January 2018, his rights were purchased by Inter, who loaned him back to Pescara.

==== Loan to Olbia ====
On 9 August 2019, Zugaro joined Serie C club Olbia on a season-long loan. Five months later, on 22 January 2020, he made his professional Serie C in a game against Siena. He substituted Mattia Pitzalis in the 74th minute. Four days later he made his second appearances, replacing Francesco Pisano in the 76th minute of a 3–3 away draw against Alessandria. On 30 June, Zugaro made his third appearances for the club, again as a substitute, replacing Antonio Candela in the 75th minute of a 1–1 away draw against Giana Erminio in the second leg of the play-out where Olbia wins 2–1 on aggregate to avoid relegation in Serie D. Zugaro ended his season-long loan to Olbia with only 3 appearances, all as a substitute, he remained an unused substitute for other 26 matches.

==== Loan to Giana Erminio ====
On 23 September 2020, Zugaro moved to Serie C side Giana Erminio on a season-long loan. Two weeks later he made his debut for the club as a substitute replacing Vincent De Maria in the 46th minute of a 2–1 away defeat against Novara. One week later, on 12 October, he played his first entire match for Giana Erminio, a 1–0 away win over AlbinoLeffe. He became Giano Erminio's first-choice early in the season. On 25 November he was sent-off with a double yellow card in the 59th minute of a 2–0 home win over Piacenza. On 17 March 2021, Zugaro scored his first professional goal in the 42nd minute of a 4–3 home win over Lucchese. Zugaro ended his season-long loan to Giana Erminio with 30 appearances, including 21 of them as a starter.

==== Loan to Virtus Verona ====
On 22 July 2021, Zugaro was loaned to Serie C club Virtus Verona on a season-long loan deal.

== Career statistics ==
=== Club ===
As of 16 April 2022

Club	Season	League			Cup		Europe		Other		Total	
Club	Season	League	Apps	Goals	Apps	Goals	Apps	Goals	Apps	Goals	Apps	Goals
Olbia (loan)	2019–20	Serie C	2	0	0	0	—		1 (Note: All appearance(s) in Serie C play-out.)	0	3	0
Giana Erminio (loan)	2020–21	Serie C	30	1	0	0	—		—		30	1
Virtus Verona (loan)	2021–22	Serie C	29	1	1	0	—		—		30	1
Career total			61	2	1	0	—		1	0	63	2
