= Marco Raina =

Italian footballer (born 2002)

Personal information
- Date of birth: 25 May 2002 (age 24)
- Place of birth: Cuneo, Italy
- Height: 1.91 m (6 ft 3 in)
- Position: Goalkeeper

Youth career
- –2016: Pro Dronero
- 2016–2021: Juventus

Senior career*
Years	Team	Apps	(Gls)
2021–2023	Juventus Next Gen (Note: The team's name was changed from Juventus U23 to Juventus Next Gen in August 2022.)	15	(0)
2023–2024	Arzignano	2	(0)
- * Club domestic league appearances and goals as of 31 August 2024

Marco Raina (born 25 May 2002) is an Italian professional footballer who plays as goalkeeper.

== Career ==
Raina played on his city's team, Pro Dronero until he reached the Giovanissimi level (under-15). In July 2016, he joined the Juventus youth sector, spending time with the under-15, under-17 and under-19 sides, until he moved to Juventus U23, the reserve team of Juventus in November 2020. In September 2019 he was called up by Juventus U23.

He signed his first professional contract on 1 October 2021. On 5 December of the same year, Juventus first-team coach Massimiliano Allegri called him up for a home match against Genoa. They won 2–0, given Mattia Perin's absence. Perin was quarantined over a COVID-19 contact. He became Juventus U23's third-choice goalkeeper during the 2021–22 season, under Lamberto Zauli's management and occasionally alternated training with Andrea Bonatti, the under-19s coach. In August 2022, he featured in the annual friendly match between Juventus A (the first team) and Juventus B (Juventus U23) in Villar Perosa. He entered the pitch in the second half. He played with the latter, without conceding a goal, but they lost 2–0 due to Manuel Locatelli and Lenardo Bonucci's goals.
