= Jean-Claude Ntenda =

French footballer (born 2002)

Personal information
- Full name: Jean-Claude Junior Ntenda Wa Dimbonda
- Date of birth: 3 September 2002 (age 24)
- Place of birth: Champigny-sur-Marne, France
- Height: 1.79 m (5 ft 10 in)
- Position: Left-back

Team information
- Current team: Virton
- Number: 23

Youth career
- 2012–2017: Taverny
- 2017–2020: Nantes
- 2020–2021: Juventus

Senior career*
Years	Team	Apps	(Gls)
2021–2024	Juventus Next Gen (Note: The team's name was changed from Juventus U23 to Juventus Next Gen in August 2022.)	6	(0)
2024	Juventus	0	(0)
2024	→ Sion (loan)	3	(0)
2024	→ Sion II (loan)	6	(0)
2024–2025	SPAL	9	(0)
2025–	Virton	27	(1)

International career
2018	France U16	5	(1)
2018–2019	France U17	11	(0)
2019	France U18	3	(0)
Medal record
Men's football
Representing France
UEFA European Under-17 Championship
Bronze medal – third place	2019 Ireland
- * Club domestic league appearances and goals as of 28 June 2026

Jean-Claude Junior Ntenda Wa Dimbonda (born 3 September 2002) is a French footballer who plays as a left back for Virton.

== Career ==
Jean-Claude Ntenda started to play football at age of 10 at Taverny as a forward. In 2017, Ntenda moved to Nantes becoming a defender. On 8 January 2020, Ntenda moved to Juventus. He made his debut for Juventus U23 on 22 August 2021 in a 3–2 Coppa Italia Serie C win against Pro Sesto. On 15 September, after a Coppa Italia Serie C match against Feralpisalò won 3–2, Ntenda had an anterior cruciate ligament injury. On 18 June 2022, Ntenda renewed his Juventus contract until 2024.

On 14 February 2024, Ntenda was loaned by Sion in Switzerland.

On 29 August 2024, Ntenda moved to SPAL in Serie C on loan, with a conditional obligation to buy.

== International career ==
Born in France, Ntenda is of Congolese descent. He is a youth international for France.

== Career statistics ==
=== Club ===
As of match played 17 December 2022

Appearances and goals by club, season and competition
Club	Season	League			National Cup (Note: Includes Coppa Italia)		Other		Total	
Club	Season	Division	Apps	Goals	Apps	Goals	Apps	Goals	Apps	Goals
Juventus Next Gen	2021–22	Serie C	2	0	0	0	2 (Note: Appearance in Coppa Italia Serie C)	0	4	0
Juventus Next Gen	2022–23	Serie C	2	0	0	0	0	0	2	0
Career total			4	0	0	0	2	0	6	0
