= Verducci =

Verducci is a surname. Notable people with the surname include:

- Joe Verducci (1910–1964), American football player and coach and college athletics administrator
- Tom Verducci (born 1960), American sportswriter

== See also ==
- Verduci
