= Pirola =

Pirola may refer to:

- Pirola (surname), including a list of people with the name
- 1082 Pirola, an asteroid
- BA.2.86, a subvariant of the SARS-CoV-2 virus, informally known as the "Pirola variant"

== See also ==
- Pyrola, a genus of evergreen herbaceous plants in the family Ericaceae
