= Alessandro Sersanti =

Italian footballer (born 2002)

Personal information
- Date of birth: 16 February 2002 (age 24)
- Place of birth: Grosseto, Italy
- Height: 1.82 m (6 ft 0 in)
- Position: Midfielder

Team information
- Current team: Modena (on loan from Juventus)
- Number: 5

Youth career
- Roselle
- Siena
- Fiorentina

Senior career*
Years	Team	Apps	(Gls)
2019–2021	Fiorentina	0	(0)
2019–2021	→ Grosseto (loan)	62	(5)
2021–	Juventus Next Gen (Note: The team's name was changed from Juventus U23 to Juventus Next Gen in August 2022.)	59	(2)
2023–	Juventus	0	(0)
2023–2024	→ Lecco (loan)	33	(2)
2024–2025	→ Reggiana (loan)	37	(4)
2025–	→ Modena (loan)	23	(2)
- * Club domestic league appearances and goals as of 10 May 2026

Alessandro Sersanti (born 16 February 2002) is an Italian professional footballer who plays as a midfielder for Serie B club Modena, on loan from Juventus.

== Club career ==
=== Early career ===
Sersanti grew up in the youth academy of Fiorentina, after playing for the youth academy of Siena. In 2019, he was loaned for two-years to Grosseto. He scored three goals in 26 appearances in the 2019–20 season. In the following season, he scored two goals in 37 appearances.

=== Juventus ===
On 30 July 2021, Sersanti moved to Juventus U23. On 22 August, Sersanti made his debut for Juventus U23 in a 3–2 win against Pro Sesto in a Coppa Italia Serie C match scoring also a goal in the 34th minute. On 6 March 2022, Sersanti was booked twice and therefore sent-off in a match eventually won 1–0 against Pro Sesto 2013.

Sersanti was included in the matchday squad of the senior Juventus team for the last three games of the 2022–23 Serie A season, but remained on the bench in all of them.

==== Loan to Lecco ====
On 11 August 2023, Sersanti moved on a season-long loan to Lecco.

==== Loan to Reggiana ====
On 12 July 2024, Sersanti was loaned to Reggiana.

==== Loan to Modena ====
On 22 August 2025, Sersanti moved to Modena on loan with an obligation to buy.

== Style of play ==
He can play as mezz'ala and full back with a good technique. He has also been compared to Paul Pogba.

== Career statistics ==
=== Club ===
As of match played 22 April 2023

Appearances and goals by club, season and competition
Club	Season	League			Coppa Italia		Other		Total	
Club	Season	Division	Apps	Goals	Apps	Goals	Apps	Goals	Apps	Goals
Grosseto	2019–20	Serie D	26	3	—		2 (Note: Appearances in Coppa Italia Serie D.)	0	28	3
Grosseto	2020–21	Serie C	36	2	—		1 (Note: Appearance in Serie C promotion play-offs.)	0	37	2
Grosseto	Total		62	5	0	0	3	0	65	5
Juventus Next Gen	2021–22	Serie C	27	0	—		9 (Note: Three appearances one goal in Coppa Italia Serie C, six appearances in Serie C promotion play-offs)	1	36	1
Juventus Next Gen	2022–23	Serie C	32	1	—		6 (Note: Appearance in Coppa Italia Serie C)	1	38	2
Juventus Next Gen	Total		59	1	0	0	15	0	74	3
Career total			121	6	0	0	15	1	136	8
