= Emanuele Zuelli =

Italian footballer (born 2001)

Personal information
- Date of birth: 22 November 2001 (age 24)
- Place of birth: Merano, Italy
- Height: 1.79 m (5 ft 10 in)
- Position: Midfielder

Team information
- Current team: Padova
- Number: 21

Youth career
- 2006: Neugries
- 2006–2008: Bolzano
- 2008–2011: Südtirol
- 2011–2014: Gherdëina
- 2014–2021: Chievo

Senior career*
| Years | Team | Apps | (Gls) |
| 2020–2021 | Chievo | 25 | (0) |
| 2021–2023 | Juventus Next Gen (Note: The team's name was changed from Juventus U23 to Juventus Next Gen in August 2022.) | 44 | (1) |
| 2023–2024 | Pisa | 5 | (0) |
| 2023–2024 | → Carrarese (loan) | 28 | (3) |
| 2024–2026 | Carrarese | 71 | (3) |
| 2026– | Padova | 1 | (0) |

International career^{‡}
| 2019 | Italy U19 | 1 | (0) |
| 2021 | Italy U20 | 2 | (0) |
- * Club domestic league appearances and goals as of 23 August 2026 ‡ National team caps and goals as of 21:20, 23 November 2021 (UTC)

Emanuele Zuelli (born 22 November 2001) is an Italian professional footballer who plays as a midfielder for Serie B club Padova.

== Club career ==
=== Early career ===
Zuelli began his youth career at Neugries at age of five, before joining Bolzano, Südtirol in 2008 and then Gherdëina in 2011. In January 2014, he moved to Chievo's youth sector.

=== Chievo Verona ===
On 23 January 2020, Zuelli signed his first professional contract with Chievo until 30 June 2024. He made his Serie B debut on 23 February 2020, in a game against Pordenone. He substituted Joel Obi in the 73rd minute.

=== Juventus ===
On 9 August 2021, Zuelli moved to Juventus U23 on a two-year contract. On 22 August, Zuelli made his debut for Juventus in a 3–2 Coppa Italia Serie C win against Pro Sesto. On 10 April 2022, Zuelli scored his first goal in his career in a 2–1 win against Renate. On 24 April, Zuelli was first called up by the first team for a match against Sassuolo.

=== Pisa ===
On 31 January 2023, Zuelli joined Serie B club Pisa on a permanent deal.

=== Carrarese ===
On 23 August 2023, Zuelli was loaned to Carrarese in Serie C. Carrarese was promoted to Serie B for the 2024–25 season, and on 17 July 2024 Zuelli returned on a permanent basis, with a two-year contract.

== International career ==
Zuelli was called up to represent Italy for the first time in February 2020 for the under-19 squad friendly against Switzerland.

== Career statistics ==
=== Club ===
As of match played 22 January 2023

Appearances and goals by club, season and competition
| Club | Season | League | | | Coppa Italia | | Other | | Total | |
| Club | Season | Division | Apps | Goals | Apps | Goals | Apps | Goals | Apps | Goals |
|---|---|---|---|---|---|---|---|---|---|---|
| Chievo | 2019–20 | Serie B | 8 | 0 | 0 | 0 | 0 | 0 | 8 | 0 |
| Chievo | 2020–21 | Serie B | 14 | 0 | 0 | 0 | 0 | 0 | 14 | 0 |
| Chievo | Total | | 22 | 0 | 0 | 0 | 0 | 0 | 22 | 0 |
| Juventus Next Gen | 2021–22 | Serie C | 32 | 1 | — | | 8 (Note: Three appearances in Coppa Italia Serie C, five appearances in Serie C promotion play-offs) | 0 | 40 | 1 |
| Juventus Next Gen | 2022–23 | Serie C | 11 | 0 | — | | 2 (Note: Appearance in Coppa Italia Serie C) | 0 | 13 | 0 |
| Juventus Next Gen | Total | | 43 | 1 | 0 | 0 | 10 | 0 | 53 | 1 |
| Career total | | | 65 | 1 | 0 | 0 | 10 | 0 | 75 | 1 |
