= Marley Aké =

French footballer (born 2001)

Personal information
- Full name: Marley Martin Mickaël Justin Aké
- Date of birth: 5 January 2001 (age 25)
- Place of birth: Béziers, France
- Height: 1.77 m (5 ft 10 in)
- Position: Winger

Team information
- Current team: Zulte Waregem (on loan from Yverdon)
- Number: 39

Youth career
- 2007–2012: Agde
- 2012–2015: Montpellier
- 2015–2018: Béziers

Senior career*
Years	Team	Apps	(Gls)
2018–2020	Marseille II	37	(14)
2019–2021	Marseille	18	(0)
2021–2024	Juventus Next Gen (Note: The team's name was changed from Juventus U23 to Juventus Next Gen in August 2022.)	45	(7)
2022–2024	Juventus	4	(0)
2023	→ Dijon (loan)	14	(3)
2023	→ Dijon II (loan)	2	(0)
2023–2024	→ Udinese (loan)	1	(0)
2024	→ Yverdon (loan)	17	(2)
2024–	Yverdon	35	(7)
2025–	→ Zulte Waregem (loan)	30	(8)

International career^{‡}
2019	France U19	1	(0)
- * Club domestic league appearances and goals as of 11 May 2026 ‡ National team caps and goals as of 11 October 2019

Marley Martin Mickaël Justin Aké (born 5 January 2001) is a French professional footballer who plays as winger for Belgian Pro League club Zulte Waregem on loan from the Swiss club Yverdon.

== Club career ==
=== Marseille ===
On 29 June 2019, Aké signed his first professional contract with Marseille. He made his professional debut with in a 1–1 Ligue 1 draw with Rennes on 29 September 2019.

=== Juventus ===
On 28 January 2021, Aké joined Serie A side Juventus on a four-and-a-half-year contract, in a deal worth €8 million, with Franco Tongya moving to Marseille for the same fee. Aké was integrated into Juventus' reserve team, Juventus U23. He made his debut on 31 January, coming on as a substitute in a league game against Giana Erminio.

Aké's first goal came on 3 March, scoring in the last touch of the game to help Juventus U23 beat rivals Novara 2–1. On 12 September, Aké missed a penalty in the 14th minute in a 1–0 defeat against Pro Patria. On 20 November, Aké scored a brace in a 2–1 win against Fiorenzuola.

On 26 February 2021, he was first called up by the first team for a Serie A match against Hellas Verona. On 18 January 2022, Aké debuted for the first team in a 4–1 Coppa Italia win against Sampdoria coming on as substitute in the 75th minute; one minute later, he won a penalty scored by Álvaro Morata after being fouled by Tommaso Augello. On 13 February, Aké made his Serie A debut coming on as substitute in the 86th minute in match drawn 1–1 against Atalanta. On 2 March, Aké played his first match as a starter with Juventus in a 1–0 Coppa Italia away win against Fiorentina in which he was substituted after the half time by Juan Cuadrado.

On 1 August 2022, Juventus announced that Aké would be sidelined for two months after he had injured his fibula during a tournée in the United States.

==== Loan to Dijon ====
On 31 January 2023, Aké joined Dijon in French Ligue 2 on loan for the rest of the season. He scored three goals in 14 matches with Dijon and also had two appearances with the club's reserve team.

==== Loans to Udinese and Yverdon ====
On 7 August 2023, Aké joined Serie A side Udinese on loan with an option to buy. On 18 January 2024, he moved on a new loan to Yverdon in Switzerland, with an option to buy.

=== Yverdon ===
On 8 August 2024, Yverdon triggered his option to buy.

==== Loan to Zulte Waregem ====
Following Yverdon's relegation from the Swiss Super League, on 2 September 2025 Aké moved on loan to Zulte Waregem in Belgium, with an option to buy.

== Style of play ==
Aké is a right-footed winger who can play in both sides but prefers playing on the left wing. Aké has good technique, speed and dribbling. Aké has also played as an attacking winger and as a full-back.

== Personal life ==
Born in France, Aké is of Ivorian descent.

== Career statistics ==
=== Club ===
As of match played 22 May 2025

Appearances and goals by club, season and competition
Club	Season	League			National cup (Note: Includes Coupe de France and Coppa Italia)		League cup (Note: Includes Coupe de la Ligue)		Continental		Other		Total	
Club	Season	Division	Apps	Goals	Apps	Goals	Apps	Goals	Apps	Goals	Apps	Goals	Apps	Goals
Marseille II	2018–19	Championnat National 2	30	7	—		—		—		—		30	7
Marseille II	2019–20	Championnat National 2	7	7	—		—		—		—		7	7
Marseille II	Total		37	14	0	0	0	0	0	0	0	0	37	14
Marseille	2019–20	Ligue 1	9	0	3	0	1	0	—		—		13	0
Marseille	2020–21	Ligue 1	9	0	0	0	0	0	4 (Note: Appearances in UEFA Champions League)	0	—		13	0
Marseille	Total		18	0	3	0	1	0	4	0	0	0	26	0
Juventus Next Gen	2020–21	Serie C	16	2	—		—		—		1 (Note: Appearance in Serie C play-offs)	0	17	2
Juventus Next Gen	2021–22	Serie C	26	5	—		—		—		1 (Note: Appearance in Coppa Italia Serie C)	0	27	5
Juventus Next Gen	2022–23	Serie C	3	0	—		—		—		0	0	3	0
Juventus Next Gen	Total		45	7	0	0	0	0	0	0	2	0	47	7
Juventus	2021–22	Serie A	4	0	2	0	—		0	0	0	0	6	0
Dijon (loan)	2022–23	Ligue 2	14	3	0	0	—		—		—		14	3
Dijon II (loan)	2022–23	Championnat National 3	2	0	—		—		—		—		2	0
Udinese (loan)	2023–24	Serie A	1	0	2	0	—		—		—		3	0
Yverdon-Sport	2023–24	Swiss Super League	17	2	0	0	—		—		—		17	2
Yverdon-Sport	2024–25	Swiss Super League	34	7	2	0	—		—		—		34	7
Career total			170	33	7	0	1	0	4	0	2	0	182	21

== Honours ==
Juventus

- Supercoppa Italiana runners-up: 2021
