= Giovanni Garofani =

Italian footballer (born 2002)

Personal information
- Full name: Giovanni Gabriele Garofani
- Date of birth: 20 October 2002 (age 24)
- Place of birth: Fiuggi, Italy
- Height: 1.88 m (6 ft 2 in)
- Position: Goalkeeper

Team information
- Current team: Carrarese

Youth career
- –2022: Juventus

Senior career*
Years	Team	Apps	(Gls)
2020–2025	Juventus	0	(0)
2021–2025	Juventus Next Gen (Note: The team's name was changed from Juventus U23 to Juventus Next Gen in August 2022.)	16	(0)
2024–2025	→ Monopoli (loan)	0	(0)
2025–	Carrarese	0	(0)

International career^{‡}
2018	Italy U16	6	(0)
2018–2019	Italy U17	2	(0)
2022	Italy U20	1	(0)
- * Club domestic league appearances and goals as of 27 April 2025 ‡ National team caps and goals as of 2 March 2025

Giovanni Gabriele Garofani (born 20 October 2002) is an Italian footballer who plays as goalkeeper for Serie B club Carrarese.

== Club career ==
On 27 November 2020, Andrea Pirlo called up Garofani for an away match against Benevento with the first squad. Garofani made his debut on 15 September 2021 for Juventus U23 in a 3–2 Coppa Italia Serie C win against Feralpisalò. On 17 October, Garofani made his Serie C debut in a 2–1 win against Seregno saving also Iacopo Cernigoi's penalty. After making five appearances, Garofani dislocated his shoulder in November, ruling him out from the pitch for five months. On 25 May 2022, Garofani renewed his contract for Juventus until 2025.

On 23 July 2024, Garofani joined Monopoli on a season-long loan. The loan was terminated early on 2 February 2025, after he made no appearances for Monopoli in the first half of the season.

Garofani was included by Juventus in their 2025 FIFA Club World Cup squad, where he remained on the bench in all games as the fourth goalkeeper.

On 28 July 2025, Garofani signed a two-season contract with Carrarese in Serie B.

== International career ==
Garofani represented Italy internationally at under-16,under-17 and under-20.

== Career statistics ==
As of match played 26 March 2023

Appearances and goals by club, season and competition
Club	Season	League			Coppa Italia		Other		Total	
Club	Season	Division	Apps	Goals	Apps	Goals	Apps	Goals	Apps	Goals
Juventus Next Gen	2021–22	Serie C	5	0	0	0	2 (Note: Appearance in Coppa Italia Serie C)	0	7	0
Juventus Next Gen	2022–23	Serie C	10	0	0	0	1 (Note: Appearance in Coppa Italia Serie C)	0	11	0
Juventus Next Gen	Total		15	0	0	0	3	0	18	0
Career total			15	0	0	0	3	0	18	0
