= Davide Luppi =

Italian footballer (born 1990)

Personal information
- Date of birth: 19 July 1990 (age 36)
- Place of birth: Trescore Balneario, Italy
- Height: 1.80 m (5 ft 11 in)
- Positions: Midfielder; forward

Youth career
- Bologna
- 2008–2009: → Sassuolo (loan)

Senior career*
| Years | Team | Apps | (Gls) |
| 2009 | Sassuolo | 0 | (0) |
| 2009–2010 | Manfredonia | 28 | (6) |
| 2010–2011 | Viareggio | 26 | (1) |
| 2011–2013 | Sassuolo | 1 | (0) |
| 2011–2012 | → Portogruaro (loan) | 30 | (3) |
| 2013–2014 | Corregesse | 27 | (29) |
| 2014–2016 | Modena | 51 | (9) |
| 2015 | → Pro Vercelli (loan) | 15 | (3) |
| 2016–2018 | Verona | 35 | (6) |
| 2017–2018 | → Virtus Entella (loan) | 13 | (3) |
| 2018–2019 | Virtus Entella | 0 | (0) |
| 2019 | Viterbese | 15 | (2) |
| 2019–2020 | Cittadella | 30 | (3) |
| 2020–2021 | Legnago | 11 | (3) |
| 2021 | Modena | 17 | (4) |
| 2021–2022 | Feralpisalò | 35 | (8) |
| 2022–2023 | Torres | 13 | (0) |
| 2023 | → Piacenza (loan) | 11 | (0) |
- * Club domestic league appearances and goals as of 22 April 2023

Davide Luppi (born 19 July 1990) is an Italian footballer who plays as a midfielder or forward.

== Career ==
Born in Trescore Balneario, Lombardy, Luppi started his career at Emilian club Bologna. Luppi was a member of Bologna U17 team for 2006–07 national student league (Allievi).

=== Sassuolo ===
After a season for Bologna reserve in national "spring" reserve league, in August 2008 he left for Sassuolo along with Lorenzo Simonini. In July 2009 Luppi signed his first fully professional contract with Sassuolo and left for Manfredonia in co-ownership deal. Sassuolo also farmed Luppi to Viareggio also in co-ownership deal in July 2010, for a peppercorn of €500. In June 2011 Sassuolo bought back Luppi again for €10,000 and re-signed a 2-year deal.

On 17 August 2011 Luppi was loaned to Portogruaro with option to buy.

=== Corregesse & Modena ===
During his one-year tenure at Serie D club Corregesse, Luppi showcased his goal-scoring ability, scoring 29 goals in 27 appearances. That season was most likely the main reason he signed up two levels of professional football the next year.

In the summer of 2014, Luppi was signed by Serie B club Modena, where he played 17 goal-less games. He was assigned number 10 shirt. On February 2, 2015, Luppi left for Pro Vercelli on a temporary deal. He had relatively better luck there, scoring 3 goals in 15 appearances.

He then returned to Modena for the season of 2015-2016, where he scored 9 goals in 34 appearances.

=== Verona ===
On 7 July 2016 Luppi was signed by Verona.

=== Entella ===
On 8 August 2017 Luppi joined Virtus Entella on a temporary deal, with an obligation to buy at the end of season.

=== Viterbese ===
On 1 February 2019 he moved to Viterbese.

=== Cittadella ===
On 20 August 2019, he signed with Cittadella.

=== Serie C ===
On 29 October 2020 he joined Legnago. On 1 February 2021, he returned to Modena. On 27 August 2021, Luppi was sold to Feralpisalò. On 22 August 2022, Luppi signed for Torres. On 19 January 2023, Luppi was loaned to Piacenza.
