= Filippo Fiumanò =

Italian footballer (born 2003)

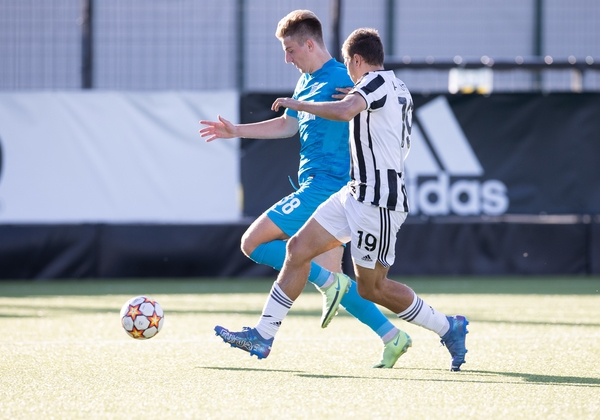

Personal information
- Full name: Filippo Fiumanò
- Date of birth: 23 February 2003 (age 23)
- Place of birth: Milan, Italy
- Height: 1.85 m (6 ft 1 in)
- Position: Defender

Youth career
- –2022: Juventus

Senior career*
Years	Team	Apps	(Gls)
	Serie C	0	(0)
2021–2023	Juventus	0	(0)
2021	→ Juventus U23 (loan)	2	(0)
2022–2023	→ Montevarchi (loan)	18	(0)
2023–2025	Pro Vercelli	7	(0)
2024	→ Fermana (loan)	0	(0)
2024	→ Alessandria (loan)	4	(0)
2024–2025	→ Chieri (loan)	15	(0)
2025	→ Manfredonia (loan)	7	(0)
Total		53	(0)

International career^{‡}
2019	Italy U17	5	(0)
2021	Italy U18	1	(0)
2021–2022	Italy U19	1	(0)
2022–2023	Italy U20	8	(0)
Medal record
Men's football
Representing Italy
FIFA U-20 World Cup
Runner-up	2023 Argentina
- * Club domestic league appearances and goals ‡ National team caps and goals as of 8 June 2023

Filippo Fiumanò (born 23 February 2003) is an Italian professional footballer who plays as a defender.

== Club career ==
A youth product of Juventus, Fiumanò made his unofficial debut for the club on 9 October 2021, in a 2–1 win against Alessandria, coming on as Arthur's substitute in the 65th minute. He received his first call-up to Juventus' reserve team on 7 November of the same year, for a Serie C match against Lecco.

On 1 December 2021, he made his professional debut for the Juventus U23 in a 2–0 league defeat against Padova, coming on as substitute in the 86th minute.

On 31 August 2022, Fiumanò joined fellow Serie C club Montevarchi on a season-long loan. Having featured in 18 league matches, he was involved in the club's relegation to Serie D at the end of the regular season.

On 27 July 2023, he joined Pro Vercelli on a permanent basis. On 16 January 2024, Fiumanò moved on loan to Fermana. Two weeks later, Fiumanò transferred again to Alessandria. On 30 August 2024, Fiumanò was loaned to Chieri in Serie D.

== International career ==
Fiumanò has represented Italy at various youth international levels, having played for all the set-ups from the under-17 national team to the under-20 national team.

In May 2023, he was included by head coach Carmine Nunziata in the Italian squad that took part in the FIFA U-20 World Cup in Argentina, where the Azzurrini finished runners-up after losing to Uruguay in the final match.

== Career statistics ==
As of match played 11 March 2023

=== Club ===
Club	Season	League			National cup		Continental		Other		Total		
Club	Season	Division	Apps	Goals	Apps	Goals	Apps	Goals	Apps	Goals	Apps	Goals	
Serie C	—		-			-		-		-		0	0

== Honours ==
Italy U20

- FIFA U-20 World Cup runner-up: 2023
