= Giuseppe Leone =

Italian footballer (born 2001)

Personal information
- Date of birth: 5 May 2001 (age 25)
- Place of birth: Turin, Italy
- Height: 1.79 m (5 ft 10 in)
- Position: Midfielder

Team information
- Current team: Pisa

Youth career
- –2020: Juventus

Senior career*
Years	Team	Apps	(Gls)
2020–2022	Juventus U23	53	(0)
2022–2023	Siena	35	(0)
2023–2026	Juve Stabia	104	(6)
2026–	Pisa	0	(0)

International career^{‡}
2017	Italy U16	3	(0)
2017–2018	Italy U17	21	(0)
2018–2019	Italy U18	9	(0)
2019	Italy U19	1	(0)
2021–2022	Italy U20	8	(1)
Medal record
Representing Italy
UEFA European Under-17 Championship
Runner-up	England 2018	U-17 Team
- * Club domestic league appearances and goals as of 10 May 2026 ‡ National team caps and goals as of 28 March 2022

Giuseppe Leone (born 5 May 2001) is an Italian professional footballer who plays as a midfielder for Serie B club Pisa.

== Club career ==
On 25 August 2023, Leone signed a two-year contract with Juve Stabia.

On 15 July 2026, Leone joined Pisa in Serie B.

== Career statistics ==
=== Club ===
As of match played on 17 May 2022

Club	Season	League			Coppa Italia		Other		Total	
Club	Season	Division	Apps	Goals	Apps	Goals	Apps	Goals	Apps	Goals
Juventus U23	2020–21	Serie C	23	0	—		2 (Note: Includes Serie C play-offs appearances)	0	25	0
Juventus U23	2021–22	Serie C	30	0	—		4 (Note: Two appearances in Coppa Italia Serie C, two appearances in Serie C promotion play-offs)	0	34	0
Juventus U23	Total		53	0	0	0	6	0	59	0
Siena	2022–23	Serie C	0	0	—		0	0	0	0
Career total			53	0	0	0	6	0	59	0
