= Daniele Grandi =

Italian footballer (born 1993)

Personal information
- Date of birth: 5 February 1993 (age 33)
- Place of birth: Clusone, Italy
- Height: 1.85 m (6 ft 1 in)
- Position: Forward

Team information
- Current team: Verbano

Youth career
- 2011–2012: Atalanta

Senior career*
Years	Team	Apps	(Gls)
2012–2013	Como	1	(0)
2013	→ Milazzo (loan)	12	(0)
2013–2014	Bologna	0	(0)
2013–2014	→ Bellaria Igea (loan)	19	(4)
2014–2016	Monza	11	(2)
2016	Folgore Caratese	0	(0)
2016	→ Legnano (loan)	11	(3)
2016–2017	Bustese	12	(2)
2017	Adelaide Blue Eagles	14	(12)
2017–2019	Seregno	58	(18)
2019–2020	Caravaggio	22	(12)
2020	Legnano	5	(0)
2020–2021	Brusaporto	23	(8)
2021–2022	Pro Sesto	20	(3)
2022–	Verbano	0	(0)
- * Club domestic league appearances and goals as of 8 August 2022

Daniele Grandi (born 5 February 1993) is an Italian professional footballer who plays as forward for Verbano.

== Club career ==
On 16 July 2021, he joined Serie C club Pro Sesto.
