= Alessandro Siano =

Italian footballer (born 2001)

Personal information
- Date of birth: 28 April 2001 (age 25)
- Place of birth: Chivasso, Italy
- Height: 1.85 m (6 ft 1 in)
- Position: Goalkeeper

Team information
- Current team: Cesena
- Number: 93

Youth career
- –2010: Brandizzo
- 2010–2020: Juventus

Senior career*
Years	Team	Apps	(Gls)
2020–2022	Imolese	36	(0)
2022	Juventus U23	1	(0)
2022–2023	Pontedera	27	(0)
2023–	Cesena	6	(0)
- * Club domestic league appearances and goals as of 13 May 2026

Alessandro Siano (born 28 April 2001) is an Italian footballer who plays as goalkeeper for Serie B club Cesena.

== Career ==
Siano started his career at Brandizzo, a children's football team in Turin. Siano played Juventus Youth Sector for ten years. On 26 August 2020, he joined Imolese signing a two-year contract. On 10 May 2021, he had an anterior cruciate ligament knee injury. He ended the 2020–21 season having played 36 matches, conceding 52 goals and having made nine clean sheets. On 31 January 2022, Siano rejoined Juventus, playing for their under-23s team. Siano debuted for Juventus U23 on 27 February, in a 1–1 draw against AlbinoLeffe. On 15 July, he was signed by Pontedera on a two-year contract.

On 28 July 2023, Siano signed a three-year contract with Cesena.

== Style of play ==
Siano has a slim physique, he is very responsive and he is good at passing the ball.

== Career statistics ==
As of match played 27 February 2022

Club	Season	League			Coppa Italia		Other		Total	
Club	Season	Division	Apps	Goals	Apps	Goals	Apps	Goals	Apps	Goals
Imolese	2020–21	Serie C	36	0	—		—		36	0
Imolese	2021–22	Serie C	0	0	—		0	0	0	0
Imolese	Total		36	0	0	0	0	0	36	0
Juventus U23	2021–22	Serie C	1	0	—		0	0	1	0
Pontedera	2022–23	Serie C	0	0	—		0	0	0	0
Career total			37	0	0	1	0	0	37	0
