= Carmine Giorgione =

Italian footballer (born 1991)

Personal information
- Date of birth: 17 June 1991 (age 35)
- Place of birth: Benevento, Italy
- Height: 1.78 m (5 ft 10 in)
- Position: Midfielder

Team information
- Current team: Sarnese
- Number: 17

Youth career
- Avellino
- Cisco Roma
- Salernitana
- –2010: Padova
- 2010: Varese

Senior career*
Years	Team	Apps	(Gls)
2010–2012	Varese	0	(0)
2010–2011	→ Valenzana (loan)	10	(0)
2011–2012	→ Savona (loan)	32	(0)
2012–2013	Asti	23	(1)
2013–2014	Kissamikos	15	(3)
2014–2015	Savona	32	(0)
2015–2016	Messina	30	(0)
2016–2023	AlbinoLeffe	217	(23)
2023–2025	Giugliano	48	(5)
2025–2026	Fidelis Andria	28	(3)
2026–	Sarnese	0	(0)
- * Club domestic league appearances and goals as of 8 October 2026

Carmine Giorgione (born 17 June 1991) is an Italian footballer who plays as a midfielder for Serie D club Sarnese

== Career ==
=== Early career ===
Born in Benevento, Campania, Giorgione played for the Berretti and Primavera youth teams of Veneto side Padova until January 2010. Before joining Padova, he also played as a striker for the "Giovanissimi" youth team of Campania side Avellino.

In January 2010, he was sold to Lega Pro Prima Divisione side Varese in a co-ownership deal. In June 2010, Padova gave up the remaining 50% registration rights of Giorgione to Varese.

At the start of the 2010–11 season, Giorgione was signed by Lega Pro Seconda Divisione side Valenzana on a temporary deal. In the next season, he left for Savona on another loan.

In October 2012, Giorgione left for Serie D side Asti.

In 2013, Giorgione left for Greek fourth division side Kissamikos.

In 2014, Giorgione was re-signed by Savona.

In 2015, he left for fellow Serie C side Messina.

=== AlbinoLeffe ===
On 23 August 2016, Giorgione was signed by AlbinoLeffe.

=== Giugliano ===
On 15 July 2023, Giorgione signed a two-year deal with Giugliano.
