= Abdul Yabré =

Italian-born Burkinabé footballer (born 1995)

Personal information
- Full name: Abdul Meyker Yabré
- Date of birth: 3 April 1995 (age 31)
- Place of birth: Casandrino, Italy
- Height: 1.78 m (5 ft 10 in)
- Position: Midfielder

Team information
- Current team: Luparense

Youth career
- 2006–2015: Cesena

Senior career*
Years	Team	Apps	(Gls)
2015–2016	Cesena	0	(0)
2015–2016	→ Santarcangelo (loan)	5	(0)
2016–2017	Vibonese	34	(0)
2017–2018	Lumezzane	18	(0)
2018–2019	Jesina	34	(1)
2019–2022	Legnago	76	(0)
2022–2023	Carpi	34	(1)
2023–2024	Dolomiti Bellunesi	2	(0)
2024–2025	Cjarlins Muzane	44	(0)
2025–	Luparense	9	(1)

International career^{‡}
2017–	Burkina Faso	1	(0)
- * Club domestic league appearances and goals as of 22 February 2026 ‡ National team caps and goals as of 4 June 2017

Abdul Yabré (born 3 April 1995) is a footballer who plays as a midfielder for Italian Serie D club Luparense. Born in Italy, he represents Burkina Faso internationally.

== Professional career ==
Yabré passed through the Cesena youth academy for 10 years, before being transferred to Vibonese.

== International career ==
Yabré was born in Italy to Burkinabé parents, and made his debut for the Burkina Faso national team in a friendly 3–0 loss to Chile on 2 June 2017.
