= Davide Pirola =

Italian footballer (born 2001)

Personal information
- Date of birth: 29 May 2001 (age 25)
- Place of birth: Italy
- Height: 1.90 m (6 ft 3 in)
- Position: Centre back

Team information
- Current team: Casatese Merate

Youth career
- Giana Erminio

Senior career*
Years	Team	Apps	(Gls)
2019–2022	Giana Erminio	48	(0)
2022–2023	Lucchese	3	(0)
2024	Casatese Merate	18	(0)
2024	Matera	11	(1)
2024–2026	Varesina	33	(2)
2026–	Casatese Merate	13	(0)
- * Club domestic league appearances and goals as of 25 June 2026

Davide Pirola (born 29 May 2001) is an Italian professional footballer who plays as a centre back for Serie D club Casatese Merate.

== Club career ==
Formed in the Giana Erminio youth system, Pirola was promoted to the first team in the 2019–20 season. He made his senior and Serie C debut on 25 August 2019 against Renate.
