= Giuseppe Verduci =

Italian footballer (born 2002)

Personal information
- Date of birth: 4 January 2002 (age 24)
- Place of birth: Reggio Calabria, Italy
- Height: 1.83 m (6 ft 0 in)
- Position: Left-back

Team information
- Current team: Reggina

Youth career
- 2006−2008: Polisportiva Bruinese
- 2008−2012: Torino
- 2012−2021: Juventus

Senior career*
| Years | Team | Apps | (Gls) |
| 2021−2023 | Juventus | 0 | (0) |
| 2021 | → Juventus U23 (res.) | 1 | (0) |
| 2021–2022 | → Grosseto (loan) | 6 | (0) |
| 2022−2023 | → Juventus Next Gen (Note: The team's name was changed from Juventus U23 to Juventus Next Gen in August 2022.) (res.) | 12 | (0) |
| 2023 | Siena | 7 | (0) |
| 2023–2024 | Torres | 2 | (0) |
| 2024–2025 | Arzignano | 4 | (0) |
| 2025– | Reggina | 5 | (0) |
- * Club domestic league appearances and goals as of 30 July 2026

Giuseppe Verduci (born 4 January 2002) is an Italian professional footballer who plays as a left-back for Serie D Group I club Reggina.

== Career ==
=== Early career ===
Verduci joined Polisportiva Bruinese at the age of four. He moved to Torino at the age of six. At the age of 10, he moved to Juventus. In 2017, he won the under-15s championship.

=== Juventus U23 ===
Verduci made his debut for Juventus U23 – the reserve team of Juventus – on 7 March 2021 in a 1–0 away win against Grosseto. On 25 August 2021, Verduci was loaned to Grosseto. On 31 January 2022, Verduci's loan was interrupted. He only made 6 appearances with them. On 2 November, he scored his first professional goal in a Coppa Italia Serie C match against FeralpiSalò.

=== Siena ===
On 23 January 2023, Verduci joined Serie C side Siena on a permanent deal, signing a long-term contract with the club.

=== Arzignano ===
On 26 August 2024, Verduci moved to Arzignano.

== Style of play ==
Verduci is mainly a left-back, but can also play as a centre-back.

== Career statistics ==
As of match played 30 November 2022

Appearances and goals by club, season and competition
| Club | Season | League | | | Coppa Italia | | Other | | Total | |
| Club | Season | Division | Apps | Goals | Apps | Goals | Apps | Goals | Apps | Goals |
|---|---|---|---|---|---|---|---|---|---|---|
| Juventus Next Gen | 2020–21 | Serie C | 1 | 0 | — | | 0 | 0 | 1 | 0 |
| Juventus Next Gen | 2021–22 | Serie C | 7 | 0 | — | | 0 | 0 | 7 | 0 |
| Juventus Next Gen | 2022–23 | Serie C | 5 | 0 | — | | 2 (Note: One appearance, one goal in Coppa Italia Serie C) | 1 | 7 | 1 |
| Juventus Next Gen | Total | | 13 | 0 | 0 | 0 | 2 | 1 | 15 | 1 |
| Grosseto (loan) | 2021–22 | Serie C | 6 | 0 | — | | 0 | 0 | 6 | 0 |
| Career total | | | 19 | 0 | 0 | 0 | 2 | 1 | 21 | 1 |
