= Lorenzo Checchi =

Italian footballer (born 1991)

Personal information
- Date of birth: 20 January 1991 (age 35)
- Place of birth: Bagno a Ripoli, Italy
- Height: 1.90 m (6 ft 3 in)
- Position: Centre back

Team information
- Current team: Forlì

Youth career
- Sestese
- 2007–2011: Siena

Senior career*
Years	Team	Apps	(Gls)
2011–2013	Siena	0	(0)
2011–2013	→ Borgo a Buggiano (loan)	36	(2)
2013–2016	Poggibonsi	92	(4)
2016–2017	Massese	32	(4)
2017–2020	Imolese	66	(6)
2020–2022	Mantova	69	(2)
2022–2023	Alessandria	30	(2)
2023–	Forlì	0	(0)
- * Club domestic league appearances and goals as of 23 April 2023

Lorenzo Checchi (born 20 January 1991) is an Italian professional footballer who plays as a centre back for Serie D club Forlì.

== Club career ==
Formed on Siena academy, Checchi made his senior debut for Borgo a Buggiano on Serie C2.

On 15 July 2016, Checchi joined to Massese.

On 12 July 2017, he moved to Imolese.

On 11 September 2020, he joined to Mantova.

On 24 August 2022, Checchi moved to Alessandria on a two-year contract.
