= Matías Soulé =

Argentine footballer (born 2003)

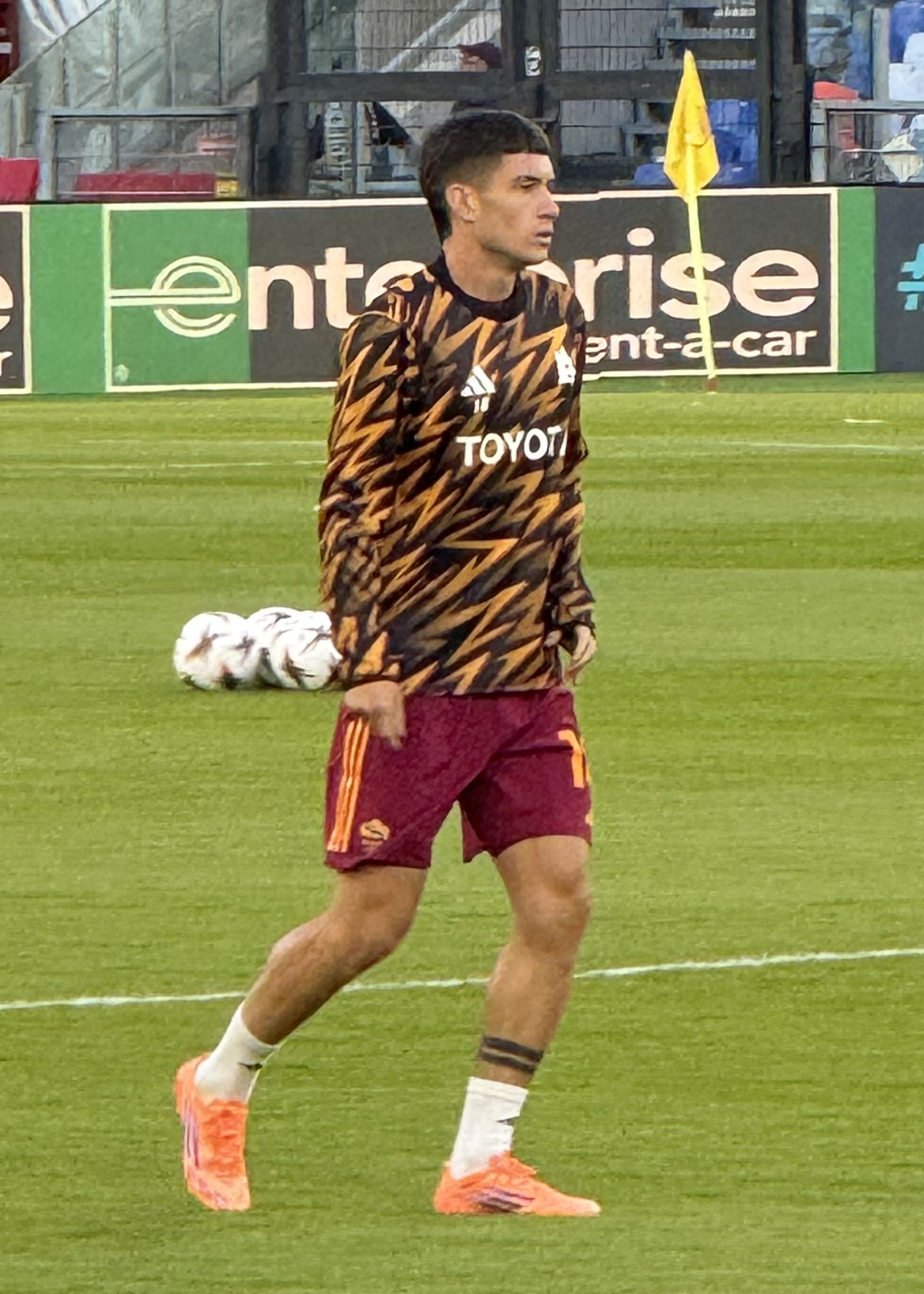
- Soulé warming up for Roma in 2025

Personal information
- Full name: Matías Soulé Malvano
- Date of birth: 15 April 2003 (age 23)
- Place of birth: Mar del Plata, Argentina
- Height: 1.82 m (6 ft 0 in)
- Positions: Attacking midfielder; right winger; forward

Team information
- Current team: Roma
- Number: 18

Youth career
- 2009–2015: Kimberley
- 2015–2020: Vélez Sarsfield
- 2020–2021: Juventus

Senior career*
Years	Team	Apps	(Gls)
2021–2023	Juventus Next Gen (Note: The team's name was changed from Juventus U23 to Juventus Next Gen in August 2022.) (res.)	28	(3)
2021–2024	Juventus	15	(1)
2023–2024	→ Frosinone (loan)	36	(11)
2024–	Roma	72	(14)

International career^{‡}
2019–2020	Argentina U16	3	(0)
2022–2023	Argentina U20	7	(0)
2026–	Argentina	2	(0)
- * Club domestic league appearances and goals as of 23:59, 21 November 2026 (UTC) ‡ National team caps and goals as of 23:45, 17 November 2026 (UTC)

Matías Soulé Malvano (born 15 April 2003) is an Argentine professional footballer who plays as an attacking midfielder, right winger or forward for Serie A club Roma and the Argentina national team.

== Club career ==
=== Early career ===
Soulé started his career aged six for Kimberley and six years later moved to Vélez with whom he refused the proposal to sign a professional contract. In January 2020, he moved to Juventus as free transfer. Soulé scored five goals and five assists in 30 appearances with under-19s in the 2020–21 season.

=== Juventus ===
Soulé made his official debut for Juventus U23—the reserve team of Juventus—in a first-round Coppa Italia Serie C 3–2 win against Pro Sesto on 22 August 2021. He made his Serie C debut on 28 August in a 2–1 win to Pergolettese. On 10 September, first-team manager Massimiliano Allegri included Soulé in the match-day squad for the Serie A game against Napoli.

On 15 September, Soulé scored his first two career goals in a 3–2 win against Feralpisalò in the second round of Coppa Italia Serie C. On 24 September, he extended his contract with Juventus until 2024 with option until 2026. On 7 November, he scored his first goal in Serie C in a 1–0 win against Lecco with a curling shoot in the 43rd minute. On 30 November, Soulé made his official debut for the first team in a 2–0 win against Salernitana coming on as substitute during the stoppage time.

He ended his first professional season with five goals in 34 matches with the addition of two first-team appearances. Throughout the season, he also played for Juventus U19 in the UEFA Youth League. With two goals in six games, Soulé helped the U19s reach the semifinals, their best-ever placing in the competition. During the semifinal against Benfica, Soulé took the last penalty of the game which he missed causing his side to lose 4–3 at penalty shoot-outs after a 2–2 draw.

On 11 October 2022, Soulé made his UEFA Champions League debut, playing for 15 minutes in a defeat against Maccabi Haifa. On the 29th of the same month, he made his first-minute debut for the first team, in the match against Lecce. On 12 March 2023, he scored his first first-team goal in stoppage time of Juventus–Sampdoria 4–2. He finished his first season with the first team with 19 appearances in mid-May, to make part of Argentina U20's team at the 2023 FIFA U20 World Cup.

==== Loan to Frosinone ====
On 28 August 2023, Soulé joined Serie A club Frosinone on a season-long loan. During the first half of the 2023–24 campaign, he managed to accomplish the most successful dribbles in the top European competitions. He finished his loan season as top scorer for the club with 11 goals, and the player with most dribbles won in Serie A in 102 occasions.

=== Roma ===
On 30 July 2024, Soulé joined fellow Italian side Roma for a reported transfer fee of $28m plus $4m in bonuses. On matchday 2 of the 2025–26 Serie A, Soulé scored the sole goal for Roma in a 0–1 away win at Pisa.

== International career ==
Soulé made three appearances for Argentina U16. On 3 November 2021, he was first called up for the Argentina national team ahead of the qualification rounds for the 2022 FIFA World Cup against Uruguay and Brazil; but did not make either of the match day squads. In May 2023, Soulé was called up to Argentina U20's 2023 FIFA U-20 World Cup campaign by coach Javier Mascherano. Due to his Italian citizenship through ius sanguinis, following his impressive Serie A performances with Frosinone, Soulé was publicly considered in 2023 by Italy manager Luciano Spalletti for a potential call-up with the senior Azzurri squad.

Soulé made his debut for Argentina national team on 3 October 2026 in a friendly against Burkina Faso.

== Style of play ==
Soulé is a left-footed right winger, noted for his dribbling ability and set-piece taking, earning him comparisons to Ángel Di María.

== Personal life ==
Soulé was born in Argentina and is of Italian descent, and holds dual citizenship. Soulé considers Independiente his favourite team and Lionel Messi his favourite player.

== Career statistics ==
=== Club ===
As of match played 21 November 2026

Appearances and goals by club, season and competition
Club	Season	League			Coppa Italia		Europe		Other		Total	
Club	Season	Division	Apps	Goals	Apps	Goals	Apps	Goals	Apps	Goals	Apps	Goals
Juventus Next Gen	2021–22	Serie C	25	3	—		—		9 (Note: Three appearances and two goals in Coppa Italia Serie C, six appearances in Serie C promotion play-offs)	2	34	5
Juventus Next Gen	2022–23	Serie C	3	0	—		—		3 (Note: Appearances in Coppa Italia Serie C)	0	6	0
Juventus Next Gen	Total		28	3	—		—		12	2	40	5
Juventus	2021–22	Serie A	2	0	0	0	0	0	0	0	2	0
Juventus	2022–23	Serie A	13	1	1	0	5 (Note: Three appearances in UEFA Champions League, two appearances in UEFA Europa League)	0	—		19	1
Juventus	Total		15	1	1	0	5	0	0	0	21	1
Frosinone (loan)	2023–24	Serie A	36	11	3	0	—		—		39	11
Roma	2024–25	Serie A	27	5	1	0	11 (Note: Appearances in UEFA Europa League)	0	—		39	5
Roma	2025–26	Serie A	33	6	1	0	8	1	—		42	7
Roma	2026–27	Serie A	12	3	0	0	4 (Note: Appearances in UEFA Champions League)	1	—		16	4
Roma	Total		72	14	2	0	23	2	—		97	16
Career total			151	29	6	0	28	2	12	2	197	33

=== International ===
As of match played 3 October 2026

Appearances and goals by national team and year
National team	Year	Apps	Goals
Argentina	2026	1	0
Total		1	0
