= Diego Stramaccioni =

Italian footballer (born 2001)

Personal information
- Date of birth: 2 January 2001 (age 25)
- Place of birth: Assisi, Italy
- Height: 1.90 m (6 ft 3 in)
- Position: Defender

Team information
- Current team: Perugia
- Number: 13

Youth career
- –2019: Perugia

Senior career*
Years	Team	Apps	(Gls)
2019–2020	Cannara	20	(0)
2020	Vis Pesaro	1	(0)
2020–2024	Juventus	0	(0)
2020–2021	→ Vis Pesaro (loan)	29	(1)
2021–2024	→ Juventus Next Gen (Note: The team's name was changed from Juventus U23 to Juventus Next Gen in August 2022.) (res.)	34	(0)
2024–2025	Reggiana	0	(0)
2024	→ Juventus Next Gen (loan)	13	(0)
2024–2025	→ Gubbio (loan)	23	(0)
2025–2026	Trapani	12	(0)
2026–	Perugia	10	(0)

International career^{‡}
2021	Italy U20	2	(0)
- * Club domestic league appearances and goals as of 30 April 2026 ‡ National team caps and goals as of 15 November 2021

Diego Stramaccioni (born 2 January 2001) is an Italian professional footballer who plays as defender for Serie C Group B club Perugia.

== Club career ==
=== Early career ===
Stramaccioni is a youth product of Perugia. He played 20 league games for Serie D side Cannara in the 2019–20 season. In the summer of 2020, he moved to Vis Pesaro. Stramaccioni made his Serie C debut on 26 September in a 2–2 draw against Legnago.

=== Juventus ===
On 2 October 2020, Juventus bought Stramaccioni and loaned him back to Vis Pesaro. Stramaccioni made 30 appearances and one goal for Vis Pesaro during the 2020–21 season. In summer 2021, Stramaccioni returned to Juventus and made his unofficial debut for them in a pre-season friendly on 24 July, coming as 74th-minute substitute in a 3–1 win against Cesena. On 12 September, Stramaccioni debuted for Juventus U23 in a 1–0 defeat against Pro Patria. On 1 March 2022, Stramaccioni was first called up from the first team for a Coppa Italia match against Fiorentina.

=== Reggiana ===
On 1 February 2024, Stramaccioni signed a contract with Reggiana until 30 June 2026 and was immediately loaned back to Juventus Next Gen until the end of the 2023–24 season. After remaining on the bench in the first four games of the 2024–25 Reggiana season, on 30 August 2024 he was loaned to Gubbio in Serie C.

== Career statistics ==
As of match played 12 March 2023

Appearances and goals by club, season and competition
Club	Season	League			Coppa Italia		Other		Total	
Club	Season	Division	Apps	Goals	Apps	Goals	Apps	Goals	Apps	Goals
Cannara	2019–20	Serie D	20	0	—		—		20	0
Vis Pesaro	2020–21	Serie C	1	0	—		—		1	0
Juventus	2020–21	Serie A	—		—		—		—	
Vis Pesaro (loan)	2020–21	Serie C	29	1	—		0	0	29	1
Juventus Next Gen	2021–22	Serie C	17	0	—		3 (Note: Two appearances in Serie C promotion play-offs)	0	20	0
Juventus Next Gen	2022–23	Serie C	14	0	—		2 (Note: Two appearances in Serie C promotion play-offs)	0	16	0
Juventus Next Gen	Total		31	0	0	0	5	0	36	0
Career total			71	1	0	0	5	0	76	1
