= Daniel Leo (footballer) =

Swiss footballer (born 2001)

Personal information
- Full name: Daniel Cosimo Osvaldo Leo
- Date of birth: 19 September 2001 (age 25)
- Place of birth: Lugano, Switzerland
- Height: 1.85 m (6 ft 1 in)
- Position: Right-back

Team information
- Current team: Lugano II

Youth career
- 2010–2011: Savosa-Massagno
- 2011–2014: Lugano
- 2014–2019: Team Ticino
- 2019: Lugano
- 2019–2021: Juventus

Senior career*
Years	Team	Apps	(Gls)
2020–2023	Juventus	0	(0)
2020–2022	→ Juventus U23 (res.)	26	(0)
2022–2023	→ Foggia (loan)	24	(0)
2023–2026	Crotone	34	(0)
2024–2025	→ Perugia (loan)	20	(0)
2026	→ Pontedera (loan)	13	(0)
2026–	Lugano II	2	(0)
- * Club domestic league appearances and goals as of 1 October 2026

Daniel Cosimo Osvaldo Leo (born 19 September 2001) is a Swiss professional footballer who plays as a right-back for Lugano II.

== Early life ==
Born in Lugano, Switzerland, Leo is of Italian descent. He studied at SCC Bellinzona.

== Club career ==
=== Youth career ===
Leo began his youth career as a right-winger for Savosa-Massagno in 2010, before moving to Lugano in 2011. He then joined Team Ticino – a club affiliated with Lugano – in 2014, where he was moved to right-back.

On 10 July 2019, Leo returned to Lugano, playing a friendly game against Inter Milan four days later; he assisted Lugano's sole goal in a 2–1 defeat. On 11 August 2019, he moved to Juventus.

=== Juventus U23 ===
Leo made his Serie C debut for Juventus U23 – the reserve team of Juventus – on 28 October 2020, in a 2–1 away defeat to Como.

==== Loan to Foggia ====
On 12 August 2022, Leo was sent on a one-year loan to Foggia.

=== Crotone ===
On 28 August 2023, Leo signed a three-year contract with Crotone.

== International career ==
In 2020, Daniel Leo was included in the Switzerland national under-20 team.

== Style of play ==
Starting out as a right-winger, Leo was moved to right-back while at Team Ticino. He has good physicality and positioning, and is capable of playing both as a wing-back in a three-at-the-back formation, and as a traditional full-back in a back four.

== Career statistics ==
As of match played 21 May 2022

Appearances and goals by club, season and competition
Club	Season	League			Coppa Italia		Other		Total	
Club	Season	Division	Apps	Goals	Apps	Goals	Apps	Goals	Apps	Goals
Juventus U23	2020–21	Serie C	6	0	—		0	0	6	0
Juventus U23	2021–22	Serie C	20	0	—		7 (Note: One appearance in Coppa Italia Serie C, six appearances in Serie C promotion play-offs)	0	27	0
Juventus U23	Total		26	0	0	0	7	0	33	0
Career total			26	0	0	0	7	0	33	0
