= Andrea Bonatti =

Italian football manager (born 1984)

Personal information
- Date of birth: 6 August 1984 (age 42)
- Place of birth: Brescia, Italy

Team information
- Current team: Dolomiti Bellunesi (head coach)

Managerial career
- Years: Team
- 2022: Triestina
- 2023: Fiorenzuola
- 2025–: Dolomiti Bellunesi

Andrea Bonatti (born 6 August 1984) is an Italian professional football coach, currently in charge of Serie C Group A club Dolomiti Bellunesi.

== Career ==
His career started in 2008 as an athletic trainer for Lumezzane for two years. He continued with the same role with Crotone, Grosseto and Salernitana. In February 2015, he received a professional coach's licence. Afterwards, he became Leonardo Menichini's assistant coach at Salernitana. In 2016, he was signed by Lazio to train their under-19s after Simone Inzaghi's promotion as first-team manager. He led the Giovani Aquile to first place in Group A of the 2016–17 Campionato Primavera, being eliminated by Roma at the quarter-finals. On 3 February 2018, he was sacked after his team had been placed in the penultimate place. In 2019, he was appointed to train the Juventus' under-16s. In August 2020, he was promoted to the under-19s. With them, he reached the semi-finals of 2021–22 UEFA Youth League, their best-ever placing in the competition. In summer 2022, he was sacked and was appointed to train Triestina. He was sacked on 10 October 2022, following a negative start of the season.

On 16 June 2023, Bonatti was unveiled as the new head coach of Serie C club Fiorenzuola on a two-year deal. He was sacked on 15 October 2023 due to negative results.

On 8 October 2025, Bonatti was appointed new head coach of Serie C club Dolomiti Bellunesi.
