= Mattia Pitzalis =

Italian footballer

Personal information
- Date of birth: 4 April 2000 (age 26)
- Place of birth: Cagliari, Italy
- Height: 1.83 m (6 ft 0 in)
- Position: Defender

Youth career
- Cagliari

Senior career*
Years	Team	Apps	(Gls)
2017–2019	Cagliari	0	(0)
2018–2019	→ Olbia (loan)	6	(0)
2019–2021	Olbia	24	(0)
2021	→ Turris (loan)	1	(0)
2021–2022	Legnago	18	(0)
- * Club domestic league appearances and goals as of 24 April 2022

Mattia Pitzalis (born 4 April 2000) is an Italian professional footballer who plays as a defender.

== Club career ==
Following the loan in the 2018–19 season, on 17 July 2019 he moved to Olbia on a permanent basis, signing a 3-year contract.

On 1 February 2021, he joined Turris on loan.

On 22 July 2021, he joined permanently to Legnago Salus.
