= Matteo Anzolin =

Italian footballer (born 2000)

Personal information
- Date of birth: 11 November 2000 (age 25)
- Place of birth: Latisana, Italy
- Height: 1.81 m (5 ft 11 in)
- Position: Defender

Team information
- Current team: Triestina
- Number: 14

Youth career
- –2015: Pordenone
- 2015–2019: Vicenza
- 2017–2019: → Juventus (loan)
- 2019–2020: Juventus

Senior career*
Years	Team	Apps	(Gls)
2021–2022	Juventus U23	33	(0)
2022–2023	Wolfsberger AC	19	(0)
2023–	Triestina	69	(1)
2025	→ Novara (loan)	9	(0)

International career
2016	Italy U16	7	(2)
2016–2017	Italy U17	17	(0)
2017–2018	Italy U18	8	(0)
2018	Italy U19	2	(0)
- * Club domestic league appearances and goals as of 30 April 2026

Matteo Anzolin (born 11 November 2000) is an Italian professional footballer who plays as a defender for Serie D Group C club Triestina.

== Club career ==
In 2015, he joined Vicenza from Pordenone. Anzolin's first Serie B call up came on 3 March 2017 for a match against Cesena set to be played the following day without being fielded. In that year's summer, Anzolin moved to Juventus from Vicenza on a two-year loan, with an option for purchase. In 2019, Juventus decided to exercise the loan option, and bought him outright.

In July 2020, Anzolin sustained an ACL injury. He made his professional debut for Juventus U23 on 7 April 2021, in a 1–1 Serie C draw against Pistoiese.

On 20 July 2022, Anzolin joined Austrian side Wolfsberger AC on a permanent deal, signing a two-year contract with the club, with an option for another year.

On 26 July 2023, Anzolin joined Serie C club Triestina for an undisclosed fee, signing a three-year contract.

== International career ==
Anzolin represented Italy at under-16, under-17, under-18, and under-19 levels.

== Career statistics ==
=== Club ===
As of match played 21 May 2022

Appearances and goals by club, season and competition
Club	Season	League			Coppa Italia		Other		Total	
Club	Season	Division	Apps	Goals	Apps	Goals	Apps	Goals	Apps	Goals
Juventus U23	2020–21	Serie C	6	0	—		2 (Note: Appearances in Serie C play-offs)	0	8	0
Juventus U23	2021–22	Serie C	27	0	—		8 (Note: Two appearances in Coppa Italia Serie C, six appearances in Serie C promotion play-offs)	0	35	0
Juventus U23	Total		33	0	0	0	10	0	43	0
Wolfsberger AC	2022–23	A. Bundesliga	0	0	—		0	0	0	0
Career total			33	0	0	0	10	0	43	0

=== International ===
Appearances and goals by national team, year and competition
Team	Year	Competitive		Friendly		Total	
Team	Year	Apps	Goals	Apps	Goals	Apps	Goals
Italy U16	2016	1	1	6	1	7	1
Italy U16	Total	1	1	6	1	7	1
Italy U17	2016	3	0	6	0	9	0
Italy U17	2017	5	0	3	0	8	0
Italy U17	Total	8	0	9	0	17	0
Italy U18	2017	—		4	0	4	0
Italy U18	2018	—		4	0	4	0
Italy U18	Total	0	0	8	0	8	0
Italy U19	2018	—		2	0	2	0
Italy U19	Total	0	0	2	0	2	0
Career total		9	1	25	1	34	2
