= Fabrizio Poli =

Italian footballer (born 1989)

Personal information
- Date of birth: 26 May 1989 (age 37)
- Place of birth: Bordighera, Italy
- Height: 1.84 m (6 ft 0 in)
- Position: Centre-back

Senior career*
Years	Team	Apps	(Gls)
2006–2008	Sanremese	19	(0)
2008–2009	Savona	35	(1)
2009–2010	Arezzo	5	(0)
2010–2019	Carpi	239	(11)
2015–2016	→ Novara (loan)	22	(0)
2019–2021	Virtus Entella	0	(0)
2021–2025	Juventus Next Gen (Note: The team's name was changed from Juventus U23 to Juventus Next Gen in August 2022.)	72	(2)
2025–2026	Team Altamura	27	(1)
- * Club domestic league appearances and goals

Fabrizio Poli (born 26 May 1989) is an Italian former professional footballer who played as a centre-back.

== Career ==
Born in Bordighera, Poli made his senior debuts with Sanremese, being relegated from Serie C2. After one full season as a backup in Serie D he joined fellow fourth division side Savona.

After acting as a starter with Savona, Poli moved to Arezzo. However, after being sparingly used with the Serie C1 side he joined Carpi in August 2010. After enjoying two promotions (the first in his debut season at the club), he made his Serie B debut on 14 September 2013, starting in a 0–2 home loss against Empoli. At the start of 2015–16 Serie A season, Poli picked number 5 shirt.

In summer 2015 Poli left for Serie B club Novara Calcio. However, on 28 January 2016 Poli returned to Carpi. The team was ranked as the third from the bottom of 2015–16 Serie A at that time. Due to number 5 was given to fellow defender Cristian Zaccardo, Poli changed to use number 13 shirt.

On 26 August 2019, he signed with Virtus Entella.

On 9 August 2021, Poli moved to Juventus U23. On 22 August, Poli made his debut for Juventus U23 in a Coppa Italia Serie C 3–2 win against Pro Sesto. On 17 February 2022, Poli scored his first goal for Juventus U23 with an header from corner kick in a match they won 4–0 against Piacenza.
