= Varesina Sport CV SSD =

Italian football club

Varesina
- Full name: Varesina Sport Castiglione Venegono Società Sportiva Dilettantistica a r.l.
- Nicknames: Fenici (the phoenixes), Rossoblù (the reds and blues)
- Founded: 2010
- Ground: Stadio Comunale di Venegono, Venegono Superiore, Italy
- Capacity: 700
- Chairman: Aquilino Di Caro
- Manager: Marco Spilli
- League: Serie D/B
- 2021-22: Eccellenza Lombardia/A, 1st (promoted)
Home colours	Away colours

Varesina Sport C.V. S.S.D. (briefly Varesina or Varesina Calcio) is an Italian association football club based in Venegono Superiore and Castiglione Olona, Lombardy. It currently plays in Serie D. Its colors are red and blue.

The club was founded in 2010 following the merge between two football associations: F.C Venegono of Venegono Superiore (founded in 1953 as A.C. Venegonese) and A.S.D. Castiglione of Castiglione Olona (founded in 1964). The headquarters and the home ground are located in Venegono.

In few years Varesina became one of the strongest amateur football clubs in the province of Varese; in the 2015/2016 season the first team participated for the first time in the Serie D championship (higher amateur division of the Italian football league system).
