= 2020–21 Juventus FC season =

Italian football club season

Juventus
2020–21 season
- Chairman: Andrea Agnelli
- Head coach: Andrea Pirlo
- Stadium: Juventus Stadium
- Serie A: 4th
- Coppa Italia: Winners
- Supercoppa Italiana: Winners
- UEFA Champions League: Round of 16
- Top goalscorer: League: Cristiano Ronaldo (29); All: Cristiano Ronaldo (36)
- Biggest win: Parma 0–4 Juventus; Juventus 4–0 SPAL
- Biggest defeat: Juventus 0–3 Fiorentina; Juventus 0–3 AC Milan
Home colours	Away colours	Third colours

The 2020–21 season was the 123rd season in the existence of Juventus and the club's 14th consecutive season in the top flight of Italian football. In addition to the domestic league, Juventus participated in this season's editions of the Coppa Italia, the Supercoppa Italiana, and the UEFA Champions League. The season covered the period from 1 September 2020 to 30 June 2021. On 25 November 2021, an eight-episode docu-series called All or Nothing: Juventus, which followed the club throughout the season, by spending time with the players behind the scenes both on and off the field, was released on Amazon Prime.

== Players ==
=== Squad information ===
Players and squad numbers last updated on 2 May 2021. Appearances include league matches only.
Note: Flags indicate national team as has been defined under FIFA eligibility rules. Players may hold more than one non-FIFA nationality.

No.	Name	Nat.	Position(s)	Date of birth (age)	Signed in	Contract ends	Signed from	Transfer fee	Apps.	Goals
Goalkeepers
1	Wojciech Szczęsny	(Poland)	GK	18 April 1990 (aged 31)	2017	2024	(England) Arsenal	€12M	74	0
31	Carlo Pinsoglio	(Italy)	GK	16 March 1990 (aged 31)	2014	2021	(Italy) Youth Sector	N/A	3	0
77	Gianluigi Buffon	(Italy)	GK	28 January 1978 (aged 43)	2019	2021	(France) Paris Saint-Germain	Free	509	0
Defenders
3	Giorgio Chiellini (C)	(Italy)	CB	14 August 1984 (aged 36)	2005	2021	(Italy) Fiorentina	€7.4M	387	27
4	Matthijs de Ligt	(Netherlands)	CB	12 August 1999 (aged 21)	2019	2024	(Netherlands) Ajax	€75M	29	4
12	Alex Sandro	(Brazil)	LB / LWB	26 January 1991 (aged 30)	2015	2023	(Portugal) Porto	€26M	135	11
13	Danilo	(Brazil)	RB / RWB	15 July 1991 (aged 29)	2019	2024	(England) Manchester City	€37M	22	2
16	Juan Cuadrado	(Colombia)	RB / RWB / RW	26 May 1988 (aged 33)	2016	2022	(England) Chelsea	€25M	130	13
19	Leonardo Bonucci	(Italy)	CB	1 May 1987 (aged 34)	2018	2024	(Italy) AC Milan	€35M	291	19
28	Merih Demiral	(Turkey)	CB	5 March 1998 (aged 23)	2019	2024	(Italy) Sassuolo	€18M	6	1
36	Alessandro Di Pardo	(Italy)	RB / RWB / RW	18 July 1999 (aged 21)	2018	2023	(Italy) SPAL	€0.5M	0	0
37	Radu Drăgușin	(Romania)	CB	3 February 2002 (aged 19)	2020	2025	(Italy) Youth Sector	N/A	0	0
38	Gianluca Frabotta	(Italy)	LB	24 June 1999 (aged 22)	2019	2023	(Italy) Bologna	€2.6M	1	0
Midfielders
5	Arthur	(Brazil)	CM	12 August 1996 (aged 24)	2020	2025	(Spain) Barcelona	€72M	0	0
8	Aaron Ramsey	(Wales)	CM / AM	26 December 1990 (aged 30)	2019	2023	(England) Arsenal	Free	24	3
14	Weston McKennie	(United States)	CM	28 August 1998 (aged 22)	2020	2021	(Germany) Schalke 04	€4.5M	0	0
22	Federico Chiesa	(Italy)	AM / RW	25 October 1997 (aged 23)	2020	2022	(Italy) Fiorentina	€10M	0	0
25	Adrien Rabiot	(France)	CM	3 April 1995 (aged 26)	2019	2023	(France) Paris Saint-Germain	Free	28	1
30	Rodrigo Bentancur	(Uruguay)	CM	25 June 1997 (aged 24)	2017	2024	(Argentina) Boca Juniors	€9.5M	81	2
33	Federico Bernardeschi	(Italy)	RW / LW / AM	16 February 1994 (aged 27)	2017	2022	(Italy) Fiorentina	€40M	79	7
41	Nicolò Fagioli	(Italy)	CM	12 February 2001 (aged 20)	2019	2023	(Italy) Youth Sector	N/A	0	0
44	Dejan Kulusevski	(Sweden)	CM / RW	25 April 2000 (aged 21)	2020	2024	(Italy) Parma	€35M	1	1
Forwards
7	Cristiano Ronaldo	(Portugal)	LW / ST	5 February 1985 (aged 36)	2018	2022	(Spain) Real Madrid	€100M^{a}	64	52
9	Álvaro Morata	(Spain)	ST	23 October 1992 (aged 28)	2020	2021	(Spain) Atlético Madrid	€10M	63	15
10	Paulo Dybala	(Argentina)	RW / AM / SS	15 November 1993 (aged 27)	2015	2022	(Italy) Palermo	€32M	162	68
34	Marco Da Graca	(Italy)	ST	1 May 2002 (aged 19)	2020	2022	(Italy) Palermo	Free	0	0
40	Giacomo Vrioni	(Albania)	ST	15 October 1998 (aged 22)	2020	2024	(Italy) Sampdoria	€4M	1	0
50	Hamza Rafia	(Tunisia)	AM / CM	22 April 1999 (aged 22)	2019	2022	(France) Lyon	€0.4M	0	0
53	Félix Correia	(Portugal)	ST	22 January 2001 (aged 20)	2020	2025	(England) Manchester City	€10.5M	0	0
Players transferred during the season
2	Mattia De Sciglio	(Italy)	RB / RWB / LB / LWB	20 October 1992 (aged 28)	2017	2022	(Italy) AC Milan	€12M	43	1
6	Sami Khedira	(Germany)	DM / CM	4 April 1987 (aged 34)	2015	2021	(Spain) Real Madrid	Free	99	21
11	Douglas Costa	(Brazil)	LW / RW	14 September 1990 (aged 30)	2017	2022	(Germany) Bayern Munich	€40M	71	6
39	Manolo Portanova	(Italy)	CM / AM	2 June 2000 (aged 21)	2019	2023	(Italy) Youth Sector	N/A	1	0
52	Wesley	(Brazil)	RB	13 March 2000 (aged 21)	2020	2022	(Italy) Hellas Verona	€1.5M	0	0

a. Additional costs of €12 million to be paid.

== Transfers ==
=== Summer 2020 ===
==== In ====
Date	Pos.	Player	Age	Moving from	Fee	Source
29 June 2020	MF	(Brazil) Arthur	23	(Spain) Barcelona	€72M+€10M variables	
29 August 2020	MF	(United States) Weston McKennie	22	(Germany) Schalke 04	€4.5M with option to buy for €18.5M+€7M variables	
1 September 2020	MF	(Sweden) Dejan Kulusevski	20	(Italy) Parma	End of loan	
22 September 2020	FW	(Spain) Álvaro Morata	27	(Spain) Atlético Madrid	€10M loan with option to buy for €45M	
3 October 2020	MF	(Italy) Rolando Mandragora	23	(Italy) Udinese	€10.7M	
5 October 2020	MF	(Italy) Federico Chiesa	22	(Italy) Fiorentina	€3M loan for the first season, €7M loan for the second season, with an obligation to buy for €40M+€10M variables	

==== Out ====
Date	Pos.	Player	Age	Moving to	Fee	Source
29 June 2020	MF	(Bosnia and Herzegovina) Miralem Pjanić	30	(Spain) Barcelona	€60M+€5M in variables	
12 August 2020	MF	(France) Blaise Matuidi	33	(United States) Inter Miami	Contract terminated	
17 September 2020	FW	(Argentina) Gonzalo Higuaín	32	(United States) Inter Miami	Contract terminated	
3 October 2020	DF	(Italy) Daniele Rugani	26	(France) Rennes	On loan until 30 June 2021	
3 October 2020	MF	(Italy) Rolando Mandragora	23	(Italy) Udinese	On loan until 30 June 2021	
5 October 2020	DF	(Italy) Mattia De Sciglio	27	(France) Lyon	On loan until 30 June 2021	
5 October 2020	FW	(Brazil) Douglas Costa	30	(Germany) Bayern Munich	On loan until 30 June 2021	

==== Other acquisitions ====
Date	Pos.	Player	Age	Moving from	Fee	Notes	Source
28 June 2020	GK	(Italy) Stefano Gori	24	(Italy) Pisa	€2M		
30 June 2020	FW	(Portugal) Félix Correia	19	(England) Manchester City	€10.5M	To play with Juventus U23	
1 September 2020	DF	(France) Felix Nzouango Bikien	17	(France) Amiens	Undisclosed fee	To play with Juventus U19	
1 September 2020	FW	(England) Samuel Iling-Junior	16	(England) Chelsea	Undisclosed fee	To play with Juventus U19	
1 September 2020	MF	(Italy) Hans Nicolussi	20	(Italy) Perugia	End of loan		
1 September 2020	DF	(Italy) Luca Pellegrini	21	(Italy) Cagliari	End of loan		
1 September 2020	GK	(Italy) Mattia Perin	27	(Italy) Genoa	End of loan		
1 September 2020	FW	(Croatia) Marko Pjaca	25	(Belgium) Anderlecht	End of loan		
1 September 2020	DF	(Argentina) Cristian Romero	22	(Italy) Genoa	End of loan		
2 September 2020	FW	(Italy) Andrea Brighenti	32	(Italy) Monza	Undisclosed fee	To play with Juventus U23	
7 September 2020	GK	(Italy) Matteo Bucosse	17	(Italy) Tolentino	Undisclosed fee	To play with Juventus U23	
11 September 2020	DF	(Italy) Tommaso Barbieri	18	(Italy) Novara	Undisclosed fee	To play with Juventus U23	
19 September 2020	DF	(Switzerland) Albian Hajdari	17	(Switzerland) Basel	Undisclosed fee		
2 October 2020	DF	(Italy) Diego Stramaccioni	19	(Italy) Vis Pesaro	Undisclosed fee	On loan to Vis Pesaro until June 2021	

==== Other disposals ====
Date	Pos.	Player	Age	Moving to	Fee	Source
28 June 2020	GK	(Italy) Leonardo Loria	21	(Italy) Pisa	€2M	
29 June 2020	MF	(Italy) Simone Muratore	22	(Italy) Atalanta	€7M	
30 June 2020	FW	(England) Stephy Mavididi	22	(France) Montpellier	€6.3M	
30 June 2020	FW	(Spain) Pablo Moreno	18	(England) Manchester City	€10M	
25 August 2020	FW	(Denmark) Nikolai Frederiksen	20	(Austria) WSG Tirol	On loan	
1 September 2020	DF	(Italy) Pietro Beruatto	21	(Italy) Vicenza	On loan with option to buy for undisclosed fee	
1 September 2020	FW	(Italy) Luca Zanimacchia	22	(Spain) Zaragoza	On loan with option to buy for undisclosed fee	
1 September 2020	FW	(Italy) Matteo Luigi Brunori	25	(Italy) Virtus Entella	On loan with option to buy for undisclosed fee	
3 September 2020	MF	(Germany) Idrissa Touré	22	(Netherlands) Vitesse	On loan	
4 September 2020	GK	(Italy) Mattia Perin	27	(Italy) Genoa	On loan	
5 September 2020	DF	(Argentina) Cristian Romero	22	(Italy) Atalanta	On loan until 2022 for €2M+€2M variables with option to buy for €16M	
9 September 2020	FW	(Italy) Marco Olivieri	21	(Italy) Empoli	On loan	
10 September 2020	GK	(Italy) Mattia Del Favero	22	(Italy) Pescara	On loan with option to buy	
12 September 2020	MF	(Cyprus) Grigoris Kastanos	22	(Italy) Frosinone	On loan with option to buy	
15 September 2020	MF	(Switzerland) Joël Ribeiro	17	(Germany) Freiburg	On loan until June 2022	
19 September 2020	DF	(Switzerland) Albian Hajdari	17	(Switzerland) Basel	On loan for two seasons	
19 September 2020	FW	(Croatia) Marko Pjaca	25	(Italy) Genoa	On loan	
26 September 2020	DF	(Italy) Luca Pellegrini	21	(Italy) Genoa	On loan	
28 September 2020	MF	(Netherlands) Leandro Fernandes	20	(Italy) Pescara	Undisclosed	
2 October 2020	DF	(Italy) Dario Del Fabro	25	(Netherlands) ADO Den Haag	On loan	
5 October 2020	MF	(Italy) Hans Nicolussi	20	(Italy) Parma	On loan	
5 October 2020	MF	(France) Naouirou Ahamada	18	(Germany) VfB Stuttgart	On loan with option to buy for €1.5M	
12 October 2020	MF	(Italy) Luca Clemenza	23	(Switzerland) Sion	On loan	
12 October 2020	FW	(France) Kévin Monzialo	20	(Switzerland) Lugano	On loan with option to buy	

=== Winter 2020–21 ===
==== In ====
Date	Pos.	Player	Age	Moving from	Fee	Source
1 February 2021	MF	(Italy) Rolando Mandragora	23	(Italy) Udinese	End of loan	
1 February 2021	DF	(Italy) Daniele Rugani	26	(France) Rennes	End of loan	

==== Out ====
Date	Pos.	Player	Age	Moving to	Fee	Source
29 January 2021	MF	(Italy) Manolo Portanova	20	(Italy) Genoa	€10M+€5M in variables	
1 February 2021	MF	(Germany) Sami Khedira	33	(Germany) Hertha BSC	Undisclosed fee	
1 February 2021	MF	(Italy) Rolando Mandragora	23	(Italy) Torino	On loan with option to buy	
1 February 2021	DF	(Italy) Daniele Rugani	26	(Italy) Cagliari	On loan	

==== Other acquisitions ====
Date	Pos.	Player	Age	Moving from	Fee	Source
14 January 2021	MF	(France) Abdoulaye Dabo	19	(France) Nantes	On loan, to play for Juventus U23 with option to buy for €0.5M	
16 January 2021	DF	(Italy) Davide De Marino	20	(Italy) Pro Vercelli	To play with Juventus U23	
22 January 2021	FW	(Switzerland) Christopher Lungoyi	20	(Switzerland) Lugano	Undisclosed	
28 January 2021	MF	(France) Marley Aké	20	(France) Marseille	€8M, to play with Juventus U23	
29 January 2021	MF	(Italy) Nicolò Rovella	19	(Italy) Genoa	€22.5M+€8.5M in variables	
1 February 2021	DF	(Italy) Gabriele Boloca	19	(Italy) Monza	End of loan	
1 February 2021	MF	(Italy) Mattia Compagnon	19	(Italy) Udinese	On loan, to play with Juventus U23 with option to buy for €0,125M	
1 February 2021	FW	(Italy) Emanuele Pecorino	20	(Italy) Catania	Undisclosed, to play with Juventus U23	

==== Other disposals ====
Date	Pos.	Player	Age	Moving to	Fee	Source
12 January 2021	DF	(Italy) Giulio Parodi	23	(Italy) Pro Vercelli	Undisclosed	
15 January 2021	GK	(Italy) Stefano Gori	24	(Italy) Pisa	On loan	
22 January 2021	FW	(France) Kévin Monzialo	20	(Switzerland) Lugano	Undisclosed	
22 January 2021	FW	(Switzerland) Christopher Lungoyi	20	(Switzerland) Lugano	On loan	
26 January 2021	DF	(Italy) Luca Coccolo	22	(Italy) Cremonese	On loan	
28 January 2021	MF	(Italy) Franco Tongya	18	(France) Marseille	€8M	
29 January 2021	FW	(Italy) Elia Petrelli	19	(Italy) Genoa	€8M+€5.3M in variables	
29 January 2021	MF	(Italy) Nicolò Rovella	19	(Italy) Genoa	On loan	
1 February 2021	FW	(Italy) Nicola Mosti	22	(Italy) Ascoli	Undisclosed	
1 February 2021	DF	(Brazil) Wesley	20	(Switzerland) Sion	On loan	

=== End of season ===
==== Other acquisitions ====
Date	Pos.	Player	Age	Moving from	Fee	Source
3 March 2021	MF	(United States) Weston McKennie	21	(Germany) Schalke 04	€18.5M+€6.5M in variables	
21 May 2021	FW	(Brazil) Douglas Costa	30	(Germany) Bayern Munich	End of loan	
15 June 2021	FW	(Spain) Álvaro Morata	28	(Spain) Atlético Madrid	€10M loan renewal	

==== Other disposals ====
Date	Pos.	Player	Age	Moving to	Fee	Source
21 May 2021	FW	(Brazil) Douglas Costa	30	(Brazil) Gremio	On loan	

== Pre-season and friendlies ==
Win Draw Loss

13 September 2020 Friendly	Juventus	5–0	Novara	Continassa, Turin
10:30 CEST (UTC+02:00)	Ronaldo 20'; Ramsey 56'; Pjaca 66'; Portanova 90+1', 90+3'	Report		Stadium: Juventus Training Center; Referee: Davide Gandino

== Competitions ==
=== Overview ===
Competition	First match	Last match	Starting round	Final position	Record							
Competition	First match	Last match	Starting round	Final position	Pld	W	D	L	GF	GA	GD	Win %
Serie A	20 September 2020	23 May 2021	Matchday 1	4th	38	23	9	6	77	38	+39	60.53
Coppa Italia	13 January 2021	19 May 2021	Round of 16	Winners	5	4	1	0	11	4	+7	80.00
Supercoppa Italiana	20 January 2021		Final	Winners	1	1	0	0	2	0	+2	100.00
Champions League	20 October 2020	9 March 2021	Group stage	Round of 16	8	6	0	2	18	8	+10	75.00
Total					52	34	10	8	108	50	+58	65.38

Source: Soccerway

=== Serie A ===
==== League table ====
Pos	Team	Pld	W	D	L	GF	GA	GD	Pts	Qualification or relegation
2	Milan	38	24	7	7	74	41	+33	79	Qualification for Champions League group stage
3	Atalanta	38	23	9	6	90	47	+43	78 (Note: Atalanta finished ahead of Juventus on head-to-head points: Juventus 1–1 Atalanta, Atalanta 1–0 Juventus.)	Qualification for Champions League group stage
4	Juventus	38	23	9	6	77	38	+39	78	Qualification for Champions League group stage
5	Napoli	38	24	5	9	86	41	+45	77	Qualification for Europa League group stage (Note: Since the winners of the 2020–21 Coppa Italia, Juventus, qualified for the Champions League, the Europa League berth awarded to the Coppa Italia winners was passed to the sixth-placed team, and the Europa Conference League berth awarded to the sixth-placed team was passed to the seventh-placed team.)
6	Lazio	38	21	5	12	61	55	+6	68	Qualification for Europa League group stage

Source: Serie A, Soccerway
Rules for classification: 1) Points; 2) Head-to-head points; 3) Head-to-head goal difference; 4) Goal difference; 5) Goals scored; 6) Draw. (Note: Head-to-head record is used only after all the matches between the teams in question have been played)

==== Results summary ====
Overall								Home						Away					
Pld	W	D	L	GF	GA	GD	Pts	W	D	L	GF	GA	GD	W	D	L	GF	GA	GD
38	23	9	6	77	38	+39	78	14	2	3	40	18	+22	9	7	3	37	20	+17

Source: Serie A

==== Results by round ====
Round	1	2	3	4	5	6	7	8	9	10	11	12	13	14	15	16	17	18	19	20	21	22	23	24	25	26	27	28	29	30	31	32	33	34	35	36	37	38
Ground	H	A	H	A	H	A	A	H	A	H	A	H	A	H	H	A	H	A	H	A	H	A	H	A	H	H	A	H	A	H	A	H	A	A	H	A	H	A
Result	W	D	W	D	D	W	D	W	D	W	W	D	W	L	W	W	W	L	W	W	W	L	W	D	W	W	W	L	D	W	L	W	D	W	L	W	W	W
Position	3	6	4	5	5	3	5	4	4	4	4	3	4	6	5	4	4	5	4	4	3	4	3	3	3	3	3	3	4	3	4	4	4	3	5	5	5	4

Source: Serie A
A = Away; H = Home; W = Win; D = Draw; L = Loss

==== Matches ====
The league fixtures were announced on 2 September 2020.

20 September 2020 1	Juventus	3–0	Sampdoria	Turin
20:45 CEST (UTC+2)	Kulusevski 13'; Bonucci 78'; Ronaldo 88'	Report		Stadium: Juventus Stadium; Attendance: About 1,000; Referee: Marco Piccinini

27 September 2020 2	Roma	2–2	Juventus	Rome
20:45 CEST (UTC+2)	Veretout 31' (pen.), 45+1'	Report	Ronaldo 43' (pen.), 69'	Stadium: Stadio Olimpico; Attendance: About 1,000; Referee: Marco Di Bello

17 October 2020 4	Crotone	1–1	Juventus	Crotone
20:45 CEST (UTC+2)	Simy 12' (pen.)	Report	Morata 21'	Stadium: Stadio Ezio Scida; Attendance: About 1,000; Referee: Francesco Fourneau

25 October 2020 5	Juventus	1–1	Hellas Verona	Turin
20:45 CET (UTC+1)	Kulusevski 78'	Report	Favilli 60'	Stadium: Allianz Stadium; Attendance: About 1,000; Referee: Fabrizio Pasqua

1 November 2020 6	Spezia	1–4	Juventus	Cesena
15:00 CET (UTC+1)	Pobega 32'	Report	Morata 14'; Ronaldo 59', 76' (pen.); Rabiot 67'	Stadium: Stadio Dino Manuzzi; Attendance: 0 (Note: Due to the COVID-19 pandemic in Italy, the match was played behind closed doors.); Referee: Rosario Abisso

8 November 2020 7	Lazio	1–1	Juventus	Rome
12:30 CET (UTC+1)	Caicedo 90+5'	Report	Ronaldo 15'	Stadium: Stadio Olimpico; Attendance: 0 Referee: Davide Massa

21 November 2020 8	Juventus	2–0	Cagliari	Turin
20:45 CET (UTC+1)	Ronaldo 38', 42'	Report		Stadium: Allianz Stadium; Attendance: 0 Referee: Fabio Maresca

28 November 2020 9	Benevento	1–1	Juventus	Benevento
18:00 CET (UTC+1)	Letizia 45+3'	Report	Morata 21'	Stadium: Stadio Ciro Vigorito; Attendance: 0 Referee: Fabrizio Pasqua

5 December 2020 10	Juventus	2–1	Torino	Turin
18:00 CET (UTC+1)	McKennie 77'; Bonucci 89'	Report	Nkoulou 9'	Stadium: Allianz Stadium; Attendance: 0 Referee: Daniele Orsato

13 December 2020 11	Genoa	1–3	Juventus	Genoa
18:00 CET (UTC+1)	Sturaro 61'	Report	Dybala 57'; Ronaldo 78' (pen.), 89' (pen.)	Stadium: Stadio Luigi Ferraris; Attendance: 0 Referee: Marco Di Bello

16 December 2020 12	Juventus	1–1	Atalanta	Turin
18:30 CET (UTC+1)	Chiesa 29'	Report	Freuler 57'	Stadium: Allianz Stadium; Attendance: 0 Referee: Daniele Doveri

19 December 2020 13	Parma	0–4	Juventus	Parma
20:45 CET (UTC+1)		Report	Kulusevski 23'; Ronaldo 26', 48'; Morata 86'	Stadium: Stadio Ennio Tardini; Attendance: 0 Referee: Gianpaolo Calvarese

22 December 2020 14	Juventus	0–3	Fiorentina	Turin
20:45 CET (UTC+1)		Report	Vlahović 3'; Alex Sandro 76' (o.g.); Cáceres 81'	Stadium: Allianz Stadium; Attendance: 0 Referee: Federico La Penna

3 January 2021 15	Juventus	4–1	Udinese	Turin
20:45 CET (UTC+1)	Ronaldo 31', 70'; Chiesa 49'; Dybala 90+3'	Report	Zeegelaar 90'	Stadium: Allianz Stadium; Attendance: 0 Referee: Piero Giacomelli

6 January 2021 16	AC Milan	1–3	Juventus	Milan
20:45 CET (UTC+1)	Calabria 41'	Report	Chiesa 18', 62'; McKennie 76'	Stadium: San Siro; Attendance: 0 Referee: Massimiliano Irrati

10 January 2021 17	Juventus	3–1	Sassuolo	Turin
20:45 CET (UTC+1)	Danilo 50'; Ramsey 82'; Ronaldo 90+2'	Report	Defrel 58'	Stadium: Allianz Stadium; Attendance: 0 Referee: Davide Massa

17 January 2021 18	Internazionale	2–0	Juventus	Milan
20:45 CET (UTC+1)	Vidal 12'; Barella 52'	Report		Stadium: San Siro; Attendance: 0 Referee: Daniele Doveri

24 January 2021 19	Juventus	2–0	Bologna	Turin
12:30 CET (UTC+1)	Arthur 15'; McKennie 71'	Report		Stadium: Allianz Stadium; Attendance: 0 Referee: Juan Luca Sacchi

30 January 2021 20	Sampdoria	0–2	Juventus	Genoa
18:00 CET (UTC+1)		Report	Chiesa 20'; Ramsey 90+1'	Stadium: Stadio Luigi Ferraris; Attendance: 0 Referee: Michael Fabbri

6 February 2021 21	Juventus	2–0	Roma	Turin
18:00 CET (UTC+1)	Ronaldo 13'; Ibañez 69' (o.g.)	Report		Stadium: Allianz Stadium; Attendance: 0 Referee: Daniele Orsato

13 February 2021 22	Napoli	1–0	Juventus	Naples
18:00 CET (UTC+1)	Insigne 31' (pen.)	Report		Stadium: Stadio San Paolo; Attendance: 0 Referee: Daniele Doveri

22 February 2021 23	Juventus	3–0	Crotone	Turin
20:45 CET (UTC+1)	Ronaldo 38', 45+1'; McKennie 66'	Report		Stadium: Allianz Stadium; Attendance: 0 Referee: Valerio Marini

27 February 2021 24	Hellas Verona	1–1	Juventus	Verona
20:45 CET (UTC+1)	Barák 77'	Report	Ronaldo 49'	Stadium: Stadio Marcantonio Bentegodi; Attendance: 0 Referee: Fabio Maresca

2 March 2021 25	Juventus	3–0	Spezia	Turin
20:45 CET (UTC+1)	Morata 62'; Chiesa 71'; Ronaldo 89'	Report		Stadium: Allianz Stadium; Attendance: 0 Referee: Juan Luca Sacchi

6 March 2021 26	Juventus	3–1	Lazio	Turin
20:45 CET (UTC+1)	Rabiot 39'; Morata 57', 60' (pen.)	Report	Correa 14'	Stadium: Allianz Stadium; Attendance: 0 Referee: Davide Massa

14 March 2021 27	Cagliari	1–3	Juventus	Cagliari
18:00 CET (UTC+1)	Simeone 61'	Report	Ronaldo 10', 25' (pen.), 32'	Stadium: Sardegna Arena; Attendance: 0 Referee: Gianpaolo Calvarese

21 March 2021 28	Juventus	0–1	Benevento	Turin
15:00 CET (UTC+1)		Report	Gaich 69'	Stadium: Allianz Stadium; Attendance: 0 Referee: Rosario Abisso

3 April 2021 29	Torino	2–2	Juventus	Turin
18:00 CEST (UTC+2)	Sanabria 27', 46'	Report	Chiesa 13'; Ronaldo 79'	Stadium: Stadio Olimpico Grande Torino; Attendance: 0 Referee: Michael Fabbri

7 April 2021 3	Juventus	2–1	Napoli	Turin
18:45 CEST (UTC+2)	Ronaldo 13'; Dybala 73'	Report	Insigne 90' (pen.)	Stadium: Allianz Stadium; Attendance: 0 Referee: Maurizio Mariani
Note: The match was initially scheduled to take place on 4 October 2020, but Napoli abandoned the match sub judice after they did not travel due to the COVID-19 pandemic. On 14 October 2020, Juventus were awarded a 3–0 victory by default and Napoli docked one point as the Disciplinary Commission ruled Napoli did not follow the COVID-19 protocol. However, Napoli appealed the result to the Italian National Olympic Committee, and the verdict was overturned on 22 December 2020, to be replayed. On 3 March 2021, it was announced that the match was to be replayed on 17 March 2021. On 12 March 2021, the match was moved to 7 April 2021.

11 April 2021 30	Juventus	3–1	Genoa	Turin
15:00 CEST (UTC+2)	Kulusevski 4'; Morata 22'; McKennie 70'	Report	Scamacca 49'	Stadium: Allianz Stadium; Attendance: 0 Referee: Marco Di Bello

18 April 2021 31	Atalanta	1–0	Juventus	Bergamo
15:00 CEST (UTC+2)	Malinovskyi 87'	Report		Stadium: Gewiss Stadium; Attendance: 0 Referee: Daniele Orsato

21 April 2021 32	Juventus	3–1	Parma	Turin
20:45 CEST (UTC+2)	Alex Sandro 43', 47'; De Ligt 68'	Report	Brugman 25'	Stadium: Allianz Stadium; Attendance: 0 Referee: Piero Giacomelli

25 April 2021 33	Fiorentina	1–1	Juventus	Florence
15:00 CEST (UTC+2)	Vlahović 29' (pen.)	Report	Morata 46'	Stadium: Stadio Artemio Franchi; Attendance: 0 Referee: Davide Massa

2 May 2021 34	Udinese	1–2	Juventus	Udine
18:00 CEST (UTC+2)	Molina 10'	Report	Ronaldo 83' (pen.), 89'	Stadium: Stadio Friuli; Attendance: 0 Referee: Daniele Chiffi

9 May 2021 35	Juventus	0–3	AC Milan	Turin
20:45 CEST (UTC+2)		Report	Brahim 45+1'; Rebić 78'; Tomori 82'	Stadium: Allianz Stadium; Attendance: 0 Referee: Paolo Valeri

12 May 2021 36	Sassuolo	1–3	Juventus	Reggio Emilia
20:45 CEST (UTC+2)	Raspadori 59'	Report	Rabiot 28'; Ronaldo 45'; Dybala 66'	Stadium: Mapei Stadium – Città del Tricolore; Attendance: 0 Referee: Piero Giacomelli

15 May 2021 37	Juventus	3–2	Internazionale	Turin
18:00 CEST (UTC+2)	Ronaldo 24'; Cuadrado 45+3', 88' (pen.)	Report	Lukaku 35' (pen.); Chiellini 83' (o.g.)	Stadium: Allianz Stadium; Attendance: 0 Referee: Gianpaolo Calvarese

23 May 2021 38	Bologna	1–4	Juventus	Bologna
20:45 CEST (UTC+2)	Orsolini 85'	Report	Chiesa 6'; Morata 29', 47'; Rabiot 45'	Stadium: Stadio Renato Dall'Ara; Attendance: 0 Referee: Paolo Valeri

=== Coppa Italia ===
13 January 2021 Round of 16	Juventus	3–2 (a.e.t.)	Genoa	Turin
20:45 CET (UTC+1)	Kulusevski 2'; Morata 23'; Rafia 105'	Report	Czyborra 28'; Melegoni 74'	Stadium: Allianz Stadium; Attendance: 0 Referee: Daniele Chiffi

27 January 2021 Quarter-finals	Juventus	4–0	SPAL	Turin
20:45 CET (UTC+1)	Morata 16' (pen.); Frabotta 33'; Kulusevski 78'; Chiesa 90+4'	Report		Stadium: Allianz Stadium; Attendance: 0 Referee: Ivano Pezzuto

2 February 2021 Semi-finals; First leg	Internazionale	1–2	Juventus	Milan
20:45 CET (UTC+1)	Martínez 9'	Report	Ronaldo 26' (pen.), 35'	Stadium: San Siro; Attendance: 0 Referee: Gianpaolo Calvarese

9 February 2021 Semi-finals; Second leg	Juventus	0–0 (2–1 agg.)	Internazionale	Turin
20:45 CET (UTC+1)		Report		Stadium: Allianz Stadium; Attendance: 0 Referee: Maurizio Mariani

19 May 2021 Final	Atalanta	1–2	Juventus	Reggio Emilia
21:00 CEST (UTC+2)	Malinovskyi 41'	Report	Kulusevski 31'; Chiesa 73'	Stadium: Mapei Stadium – Città del Tricolore; Attendance: 4,300; Referee: Davide Massa

=== Supercoppa Italiana ===
20 January 2021 Final	Juventus	2–0	Napoli	Reggio Emilia
21:00 CET (UTC+1)	Ronaldo 64'; Morata 90+5'	Report		Stadium: Mapei Stadium – Città del Tricolore; Attendance: 0 Referee: Paolo Valeri

=== UEFA Champions League ===
==== Group stage ====
The draw for the group stage was held on 1 October 2020.

Pos	Team	Pld	W	D	L	GF	GA	GD	Pts	Qualification	JUV	BAR	DKV	FER
1	(Italy) Juventus	6	5	0	1	14	4	+10	15 (Note: Tied on head-to-head points (3). Head-to-head goal difference: Juventus +1, Barcelona –1.)	Advance to knockout phase	—	0–2	3–0	2–1
2	(Spain) Barcelona	6	5	0	1	16	5	+11	15	Advance to knockout phase	0–3	—	2–1	5–1
3	(Ukraine) Dynamo Kyiv	6	1	1	4	4	13	−9	4	Transfer to Europa League	0–2	0–4	—	1–0
4	(Hungary) Ferencváros	6	0	1	5	5	17	−12	1		1–4	0–3	2–2	—

Source: UEFA
Rules for classification: Group stage tiebreakers
Notes:

20 October 2020 1	Dynamo Kyiv (Ukraine)	0–2	(Italy) Juventus	Kyiv, Ukraine
19:55 EEST (UTC+03:00)		Report	Morata 46', 84'	Stadium: NSC Olimpiyskiy; Attendance: 14,850; Referee: Ovidiu Hațegan (Romania)

28 October 2020 2	Juventus (Italy)	0–2	(Spain) Barcelona	Turin, Italy
21:00 CET (UTC+01:00)		Report	Dembélé 14'; Messi 90+1' (pen.)	Stadium: Juventus Stadium; Attendance: 0 (Note: Due to the COVID-19 pandemic in Europe, the match was played behind closed doors.); Referee: Danny Makkelie (Netherlands)

4 November 2020 3	Ferencváros (Hungary)	1–4	(Italy) Juventus	Budapest, Hungary
21:00 CET (UTC+01:00)	Boli 90'	Report	Morata 7', 60'; Dybala 73'; Dvali 81' (o.g.)	Stadium: Puskás Aréna (Note: Ferencváros played their home match against Juventus at Puskás Aréna, Budapest, instead of their regular home stadium Groupama Arena.); Attendance: 18,531; Referee: Orel Grinfeld (Israel)

24 November 2020 4	Juventus (Italy)	2–1	(Hungary) Ferencváros	Turin, Italy
21:00 CET (UTC+01:00)	Ronaldo 35'; Morata 90+2'	Report	Uzuni 19'	Stadium: Juventus Stadium; Attendance: 0 Referee: Daniel Siebert (Germany)

2 December 2020 5	Juventus (Italy)	3–0	(Ukraine) Dynamo Kyiv	Turin, Italy
21:00 CET (UTC+01:00)	Chiesa 21'; Ronaldo 57'; Morata 66'	Report		Stadium: Juventus Stadium; Attendance: 0 Referee: Stéphanie Frappart (France)

8 December 2020 6	Barcelona (Spain)	0–3	(Italy) Juventus	Barcelona, Spain
21:00 CET (UTC+01:00)		Report	Ronaldo 13' (pen.), 52' (pen.); McKennie 20'	Stadium: Camp Nou; Attendance: 0 Referee: Tobias Stieler (Germany)

==== Knockout phase ====
===== Round of 16 =====
The draw for the round of 16 was held on 14 December 2020.

17 February 2021 First leg	Porto (Portugal)	2–1	(Italy) Juventus	Porto, Portugal
20:00 WET (UTC+1)	Taremi 2'; Marega 46'	Report	Chiesa 82'	Stadium: Estádio do Dragão; Attendance: 0 Referee: Carlos del Cerro Grande (Spain)

9 March 2021 Second leg	Juventus (Italy)	3–2 (a.e.t.) (4–4 (a) agg.)	(Portugal) Porto	Turin, Italy
21:00 CET (UTC+1)	Chiesa 49', 63'; Rabiot 117'	Report	Oliveira 19' (pen.), 115'	Stadium: Juventus Stadium; Attendance: 0 Referee: Björn Kuipers (Netherlands)

== Statistics ==
=== Appearances and goals ===
No.	Pos	Nat	Player	Total		Serie A		Supercoppa Italiana		Coppa Italia		Champions League	
No.	Pos	Nat	Player	Apps	Goals	Apps	Goals	Apps	Goals	Apps	Goals	Apps	Goals
Goalkeepers
1	GK	(Poland) POL	Wojciech Szczęsny	38	0	30	0	1	0	0	0	7	0
31	GK	(Italy) ITA	Carlo Pinsoglio	1	0	0+1	0	0	0	0	0	0	0
77	GK	(Italy) ITA	Gianluigi Buffon	14	0	8	0	0	0	5	0	1	0
Defenders
3	DF	(Italy) ITA	Giorgio Chiellini	25	0	16+1	0	1	0	2+2	0	3	0
4	DF	(Netherlands) NED	Matthijs de Ligt	36	1	25+2	1	0	0	4	0	4+1	0
12	DF	(Brazil) BRA	Alex Sandro	34	2	20+6	2	0	0	2+1	0	5	0
13	DF	(Brazil) BRA	Danilo	46	1	32+2	1	1	0	2+2	0	6+1	0
16	DF	(Colombia) COL	Juan Cuadrado	40	2	26+4	2	1	0	3	0	6	0
19	DF	(Italy) ITA	Leonardo Bonucci	35	2	23+3	2	1	0	0+2	0	6	0
28	DF	(Turkey) TUR	Merih Demiral	24	0	10+5	0	0	0	4	0	3+2	0
36	DF	(Italy) ITA	Alessandro Di Pardo	5	0	0+4	0	0	0	0+1	0	0	0
37	DF	(Romania) ROU	Radu Drăgușin	4	0	0+1	0	0	0	2	0	0+1	0
38	DF	(Italy) ITA	Gianluca Frabotta	17	1	8+7	0	0	0	1	1	0+1	0
Midfielders
5	MF	(Brazil) BRA	Arthur	32	1	13+9	1	1	0	1+1	0	4+3	0
8	MF	(Wales) WAL	Aaron Ramsey	30	2	13+9	2	0	0	1	0	5+2	0
14	MF	(United States) USA	Weston McKennie	46	6	18+16	5	1	0	2+2	0	4+3	1
22	MF	(Italy) ITA	Federico Chiesa	43	14	28+2	8	1	0	1+3	2	6+2	4
25	MF	(France) FRA	Adrien Rabiot	47	5	25+9	4	0+1	0	4+1	0	5+2	1
30	MF	(Uruguay) URU	Rodrigo Bentancur	45	0	27+6	0	1	0	4	0	5+2	0
33	MF	(Italy) ITA	Federico Bernardeschi	39	0	8+19	0	0+1	0	4	0	1+6	0
41	MF	(Italy) ITA	Nicolò Fagioli	2	0	0+1	0	0	0	1	0	0	0
44	MF	(Sweden) SWE	Dejan Kulusevski	47	7	19+16	4	1	0	5	3	3+3	0
Forwards
7	FW	(Portugal) POR	Cristiano Ronaldo	44	36	31+2	29	1	1	3+1	2	6	4
9	FW	(Spain) ESP	Álvaro Morata	44	20	23+9	11	0+1	1	2+1	2	6+2	6
10	FW	(Argentina) ARG	Paulo Dybala	26	5	14+6	4	0	0	0+1	0	2+3	1
34	FW	(Italy) ITA	Marco Da Graca	1	0	0	0	0	0	0+1	0	0	0
40	FW	(Albania) ALB	Giacomo Vrioni	1	0	0+1	0	0	0	0	0	0	0
50	FW	(Tunisia) TUN	Hamza Rafia	1	1	0	0	0	0	0+1	1	0	0
53	FW	(Portugal) POR	Félix Correia	1	0	0+1	0	0	0	0	0	0	0
Players transferred/loaned out during the season
2	DF	(Italy) ITA	Mattia De Sciglio	1	0	0+1	0	0	0	0	0	0	0
6	MF	(Germany) GER	Sami Khedira	0	0	0	0	0	0	0	0	0	0
11	FW	(Brazil) BRA	Douglas Costa	2	0	0+2	0	0	0	0	0	0	0
39	MF	(Italy) ITA	Manolo Portanova	3	0	1+1	0	0	0	1	0	0	0
52	DF	(Brazil) BRA	Wesley	1	0	0	0	0	0	1	0	0	0

Source: Competitions

=== Goalscorers ===
Rank	No.	Pos.	Name	Serie A	Supercoppa	Coppa Italia	Champions League	Total
1	7	FW	(Portugal) Cristiano Ronaldo	29	1	2	4	36
2	9	FW	(Spain) Álvaro Morata	11	1	2	6	20
3	22	MF	(Italy) Federico Chiesa	8	0	2	4	14
4	44	MF	(Sweden) Dejan Kulusevski	4	0	3	0	7
5	14	MF	(United States) Weston McKennie	5	0	0	1	6
6	10	FW	(Argentina) Paulo Dybala	4	0	0	1	5
6	25	MF	(France) Adrien Rabiot	4	0	0	1	5
8	8	MF	(Wales) Aaron Ramsey	2	0	0	0	2
8	12	DF	(Brazil) Alex Sandro	2	0	0	0	2
8	16	DF	(Colombia) Juan Cuadrado	2	0	0	0	2
8	19	DF	(Italy) Leonardo Bonucci	2	0	0	0	2
12	4	DF	(Netherlands) Matthijs de Ligt	1	0	0	0	1
12	5	MF	(Brazil) Arthur	1	0	0	0	1
12	13	DF	(Brazil) Danilo	1	0	0	0	1
12	38	DF	(Italy) Gianluca Frabotta	0	0	1	0	1
12	50	FW	(Tunisia) Hamza Rafia	0	0	1	0	1
Own goals				1	0	0	1	2
Totals				77	2	11	18	108

== See also ==
- 2020–21 Juventus F.C. Under-23 season
- 2020–21 Juventus F.C. (women) season
