= 2020–21 Juventus FC Under-23 season =

Juventus U23
2020–21 season
- Chairman: Andrea Agnelli
- Head coach: Andrea Pirlo (until 8 August 2020); Lamberto Zauli (from 22 August 2020)
- Stadium: Stadio Giuseppe Moccagatta
- Serie C: 10th
- Top goalscorer: League: Andrea Brighenti; Félix Correia; Alejandro Marqués (7 each); All: Andrea Brighenti; Félix Correia (8 each)
Home colours	Away colours	Third colours

The 2020–21 season was the 3rd season in the existence of Juventus U23 and the club's 3rd consecutive season in the Serie C, the third level of Italian football. Juventus U23 finished 10th in the regular season, and qualified for the first round of the promotion play-offs. They were eliminated in the second round against Pro Vercelli.

== Serie C ==
Juventus U23's season started on 28 September 2020, with a 2–1 victory over Pro Sesto, where Raffaele Alcibiade was sent-off in 89th minute. On 3 October, they won again with the 2–1 result over Giana Erminio. Juventus U23's first draw came on 21 October, 1–1 against AlbinoLeffe through two penalty kicks. Their first defeat was on 21 October with a 1–0 result against Pro Vercelli. Then, they won 1–0 over Lucchese, where Félix Correia given a red card in the 93rd minute, and lost 2–1 against Como. Juventus U23 started the mouth of November with three 1–1 draws: against Lecco, Livorno and a 10–men Novara. Then, they made a 3–2 victory over Pistoiese, where Elia Petrelli made a hat-trick, a 2–0 win against Grosseto and a 2–1 defeat against Olbia. Junvetus U23 started December with two 3–1 victories in a row against Pergolettese and Pro Patria but they made in the same month, three consecutive defeats: 1–0 against Alessandria and 2–1 against Pontedera and Renate, where Filippo Delli Carri was sent-off.

=== Matches ===
Results list Juventus U23's goal tally first.

Date	Opponent	Venue	Result	Scorers
28 September 2020	Pro Sesto	Home	2–1	Di Pardo 54', Correia 67'
3 October 2020	Giana Erminio	Away	2–1	Marqués 38', Ranocchia 64'
17 October 2020	AlbinoLeffe	Home	1–1	Del Sole 75' (pen.)
21 October 2020	Pro Vercelli	Away	0–1	
25 October 2020	Lucchese	Away	1–0	Solcia 45' (o.g.)
28 October 2020	Como	Home	1–2	Marqués 77'
1 November 2020	Lecco	Home	1–1	Fagioli 18'
4 November 2020	Livorno	Away	1–1	Petrelli 79'
8 November 2020	Novara	Away	1–1	Lanini 36'
22 November 2020	Pistoiese	Home	3–2	Petrelli (3) 10', 24', 27'
25 November 2020	Grosseto	Home	2–0	Vrioni 47', Rafia 53'
29 November 2020	Olbia	Away	1–2	Rafia 65'
2 December 2020	Pergolettese	Away	3–1	Petrelli 30', Correia 74', Del Sole 84'
6 December 2020	Pro Patria	Home	3–1	Ranocchia 8', Correia 37', Greco 52' (o.g.)
13 December 2020	Alessandria	Home	0–1	
20 December 2020	Pontedera	Away	1–2	Brighenti 67' (pen.)
23 December 2020	Renate	Home	1–2	Correia 65'
9 January 2021	Carrarese	Away	1–0	Correia 83'
17 January 2021	Piacenza	Home	1–1	Mosti 63'
24 January 2021	Pro Sesto	Away	1–1	Cerri 87'
31 January 2021	Giana Erminio	Home	3–2	Alcibiade 37', Brighenti (2) 48' 63' (pen.)
3 February 2021	Como	Away	0–3	
7 February 2021	Livorno	Home	6–0	Brighenti (2) 26', 29', Marqués 30', Correia 47', Compagnon 64', Pecorino 70'
13 February 2021	AlbinoLeffe	Away	3–0	Correia 9', Drăgușin 32', Ranocchia 52'
16 February 2021	Pro Vercelli	Home	0–2	
21 February 2021	Lucchese	Home	1–1	Marqués 64'
28 February 2021	Como	Away	4–0	
3 March 2021	Novara	Home	2–1	Brighenti 24', Aké 90+3'
7 March 2021	Grosseto	Away	1–0	Da Graca 85'
25 March 2021	Pergolettese	Home	2–4	Brighenti 15', Alcibiade 90'+3'
29 March 2021	Pro Patria	Away	0–1	
3 April 2021	Alessandria	Away	0–2	
7 April 2021	Pistoiese	Away	1–1	Marqués 68'
11 April 2021	Pontedera	Home	1–1	Marqués 16'
18 April 2021	Renate	Away	1–2	Aké 17'
22 April 2021	Olbia	Home	1–1	Compagnon 81'
25 April 2021	Carrarese	Home	1–0	Vrioni 90'+2' (pen.)
2 May 2021	Piacenza	Away	2–3	Troiano 9', Fagioli 21' (pen.)

=== League table ===
Pos	Team	Pld	W	D	L	GF	GA	GD	Pts	Qualification
8	Pontedera	38	14	13	11	47	40	+7	55	Qualification to the promotion play-offs
9	Grosseto	38	14	12	12	43	41	+2	54	Qualification to the promotion play-offs
10	Juventus U23	38	14	10	14	52	50	+2	52	Qualification to the promotion play-offs
11	Novara (D, R)	38	12	13	13	48	49	−1	49 (Note: Novara finished ahead of Piacenza on head-to-head points: Piacenza 3–3 Novara, Novara 2–0 Piacenza.)	Excluded and relegated to Serie D
12	Piacenza	38	12	13	13	47	48	−1	49	

Source: Lega Pro (in Italian), Soccerway (in English)
Rules for classification: 1) Points; 2) Head-to-head points; 3) Head-to-head goal difference; 4) Goal difference; 5) Goals scored; 6) Lower goals against; 7) Wins; 8) Lower losses; 9) Away wins; 10) Lower home losses.
(D) Disqualified; (R) Relegated

== Serie C play-off ==
=== Overview ===
Since Juventus U23 finished tenth in the regular season, they qualified for the first round of the promotion play-offs. On 9 May 2021, Juventus U23 won 3–1 at away the first round against Pro Patria, with goals from Filippo Ranocchia, Andrea Brighenti, Félix Correia. Juventus U23 were due to play the second round three days later, but due to the postponement of another first round match due to players testing positive for COVID-19, it was decided to postpone to 19 May all second round matches. Juventus lost 1–0 the second round against Pro Vercelli due to a goal on a diagonal shot by Rocco Costantino.

=== Play-offs ===
Results list Juventus U23's goal tally first.

Date	Round	Opponent	Venue	Result	Scorers
9 May 2021	First round	Pro Patria	Away	3–1	Ranocchia 34', Brighenti 55', Correia 90'+5'
19 May 2021 (Note: The match was postponed from 12 to 19 May due to the COVID-19 pandemic in Italy.)	Second round	Pro Vercelli	Away	0–1	

== Player details ==
As of 19 May 2021

No.	Pos	Nat	Player	Total		Serie C		Serie C play-offs	
No.	Pos	Nat	Player	Apps	Goals	Apps	Goals	Apps	Goals
1	GK	(Italy) ITA	Timothy Nocchi	14	0	14	0	0	0
2	DF	(Brazil) BRA	Lucas Rosa	12	0	7+5	0	0	0
3	DF	(Italy) ITA	Luca Coccolo	18	0	17+1	0	0	0
4	MF	(Italy) ITA	Michele Troiano	20	1	5+14	1	1	0
5	DF	(Romania) ROU	Radu Drăgușin	10	1	8	1	2	0
6	MF	(Belgium) BEL	Daouda Peeters	29	0	27	0	2	0
7	MF	(France) FRA	Abdoulaye Dabo	18	0	6+10	0	1+1	0
7	FW	(Italy) ITA	Elia Petrelli	15	5	5+10	5	0	0
8	MF	(Italy) ITA	Filippo Ranocchia	30	4	25+3	3	2	1
9	FW	(Spain) ESP	Alejandro Marqués	26	7	21+4	7	0+1	0
10	MF	(Italy) ITA	Nicolò Fagioli	20	2	16+3	2	0+1	0
11	FW	(Italy) ITA	Andrea Brighenti	30	8	23+5	7	2	1
12	GK	(Uruguay) URU	Franco Israel	20	0	18	0	2	0
13	DF	(Italy) ITA	Raffaele Alcibiade (c)	27	2	22+3	2	2	0
14	MF	(Italy) ITA	Mattia Compagnon	12	2	1+11	2	0	0
15	DF	(Italy) ITA	Riccardo Capellini	24	0	24	0	0	0
16	DF	(Italy) ITA	Matteo Anzolin	8	0	4+2	0	2	0
17	FW	(Portugal) POR	Félix Correia	30	8	26+2	7	2	1
18	DF	(Italy) ITA	Alessandro Di Pardo	20	1	18	1	2	0
19	FW	(Tunisia) TUN	Hamza Rafia	24	2	20+3	2	0+1	0
20	MF	(Italy) ITA	Giuseppe Leone	24	0	11+12	0	1	0
21	FW	(Albania) ALB	Giacomo Vrioni	8	2	2+4	2	1+1	0
22	GK	(Italy) ITA	Matteo Bucosse	5	0	5	0	0	0
23	FW	(France) FRA	Marley Aké	17	2	12+4	2	1	0
24	DF	(Italy) ITA	Davide De Marino	13	0	11+2	0	0	0
25	DF	(Italy) ITA	Paolo Gozzi	13	0	8+5	0	0	0
26	DF	(Italy) ITA	Tommaso Barbieri	15	0	8+7	0	0	0
27	FW	(Italy) ITA	Ferdinando Del Sole	14	2	4+10	2	0	0
28	MF	(Argentina) ARG	Enzo Barrenechea	3	0	1+2	0	0	0
29	MF	(Italy) ITA	Nicola Mosti	12	1	6+6	1	0	0
29	FW	(Italy) ITA	Emanuele Pecorino	2	1	0+2	1	0	0
30	GK	(Italy) ITA	Giovanni Garofani	0	0	0	0	0	0
31	MF	(Italy) ITA	Nikola Sekulov	3	0	2+1	0	0	0
32	MF	(Italy) ITA	Franco Tongya	10	0	5+5	0	0	0
33	DF	(Italy) ITA	Filippo Delli Carri	24	0	20+3	0	0+1	0
34	DF	(Brazil) BRA	Wesley	7	0	5+2	0	0	0
34	MF	(Italy) ITA	Fabio Miretti	4	0	0+4	0	0	0
35	DF	(Switzerland) SUI	Daniel Leo	6	0	6	0	0	0
36	FW	(Italy) ITA	Marco Da Graca	7	1	0+7	1	0	0
37	DF	(Italy) ITA	Alessandro Riccio	0	0	0	0	0	0
38	GK	(Italy) ITA	Marco Raina	0	0	0	0	0	0
39	FW	(Italy) ITA	Leonardo Cerri	4	1	0+4	1	0	0
40	GK	(Hungary) HUN	Zsombor Senkó	1	0	1	0	0	0
41	DF	(Italy) ITA	Giuseppe Verduci	1	0	0+1	0	0	0

== See also ==
- 2020–21 Juventus F.C. season
- 2020–21 Juventus F.C. (women) season
