= Radu Drăgușin =

Romanian footballer (born 2002)

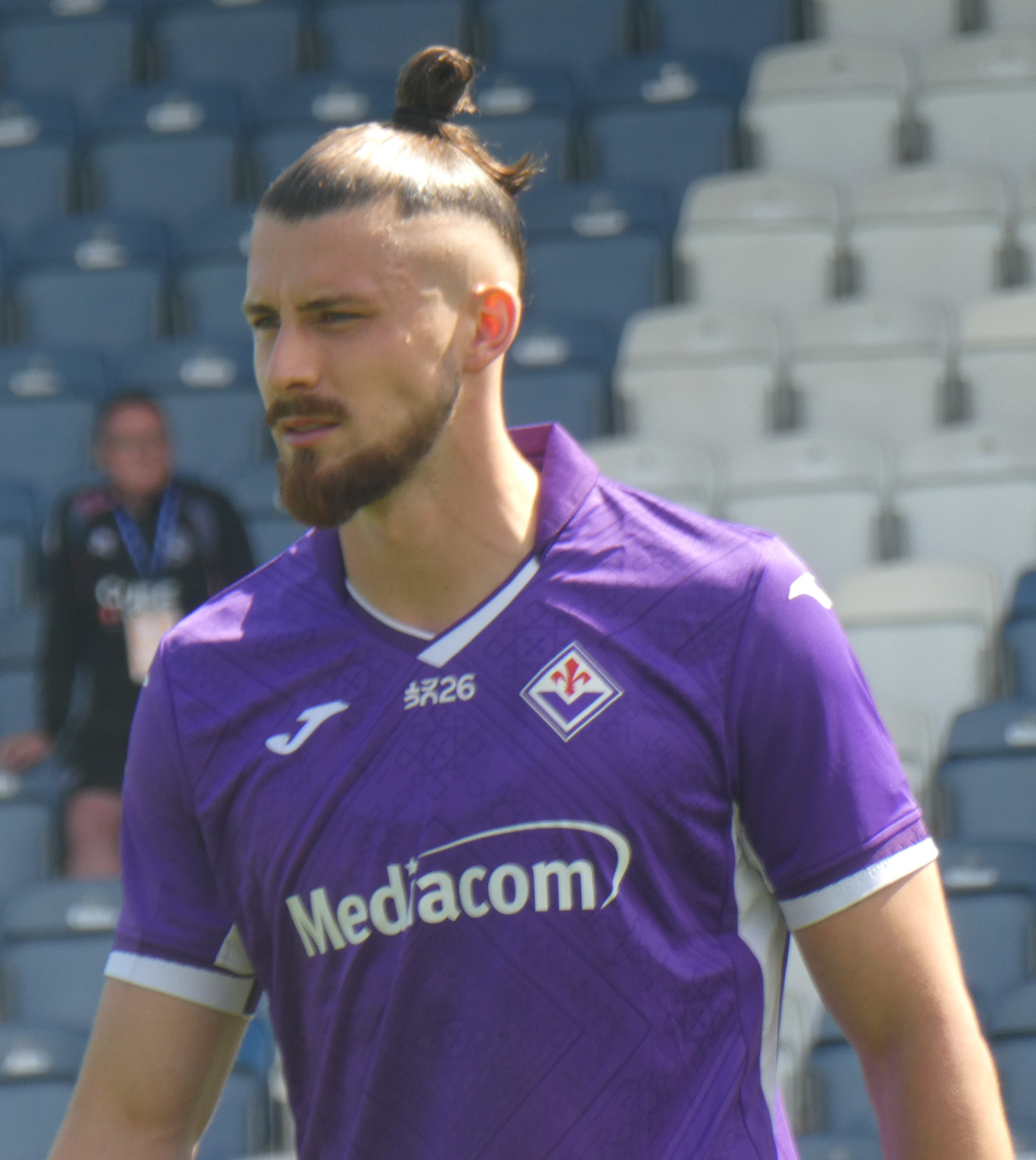
- Drăgușin with Fiorentina in 2026

Personal information
- Full name: Radu Matei Drăgușin
- Date of birth: 3 February 2002 (age 24)
- Place of birth: Bucharest, Romania
- Height: 1.91 m (6 ft 3 in)
- Position: Centre-back

Team information
- Current team: Fiorentina (on loan from Tottenham Hotspur)
- Number: 3

Youth career
- 2009–2013: Sportul Studențesc
- 2013–2018: Regal Sport București
- 2018–2020: Juventus

Senior career*
| Years | Team | Apps | (Gls) |
| 2020–2021 | Juventus U23 | 10 | (1) |
| 2020–2023 | Juventus | 1 | (0) |
| 2021–2022 | → Sampdoria (loan) | 13 | (0) |
| 2022 | → Salernitana (loan) | 7 | (0) |
| 2022–2023 | → Genoa (loan) | 38 | (4) |
| 2023–2024 | Genoa | 19 | (2) |
| 2024– | Tottenham Hotspur | 35 | (0) |
| 2026– | → Fiorentina (loan) | 11 | (0) |

International career^{‡}
| 2017 | Romania U15 | 2 | (0) |
| 2017–2018 | Romania U16 | 14 | (1) |
| 2018–2019 | Romania U17 | 6 | (1) |
| 2019 | Romania U18 | 2 | (0) |
| 2019 | Romania U19 | 4 | (0) |
| 2020–2022 | Romania U21 | 9 | (0) |
| 2022– | Romania | 34 | (1) |
- * Club domestic league appearances and goals as of 8 November 2026 ‡ National team caps and goals as of 17 November 2026

Radu Matei Drăgușin (Romanian pronunciation: [ˈradu drəguˈʃin]; born 3 February 2002) is a Romanian professional footballer who plays as a centre-back for Serie A club Fiorentina, on loan from Premier League club Tottenham Hotspur, and the Romania national team.

Drăgușin started out his senior career with the reserves of Italian club Juventus in 2020, and later that year registered his debut for the first team, aged 18. Following loans to Sampdoria, Salernitana, and Genoa, respectively, he signed a permanent contract with the latter in 2023. The next January, he joined English side Tottenham Hotspur in a transfer worth an initial €25 million (£21.5 million), making him the most expensive Romanian footballer of all time.

Internationally, Drăgușin made his full debut for Romania in a 1–0 friendly loss to Greece in March 2022. He competed for his country in the UEFA Euro 2024, achieving first place in their group and advancing to the round of 16.

== Early and personal life ==
Drăgușin was born in Bucharest to Svetlana (née Simion) and Dan Drăgușin, former Romanian internationals in basketball and volleyball, respectively. He has a younger sister named Meira, who also plays basketball.

On 1 October 2025, Drăgușin announced his engagement to Ioana Stan. On 20 January 2026, the couple got married.

== Club career ==
=== Early career ===
Drăgușin was persuaded to play football by his cousin, and joined the youth squads of Sportul Studențesc at the age of seven. He played at the club for four years before its dissolution, and then moved to Regal Sport București where he was teammates with Octavian Popescu and Luca Florică among others.

=== Juventus ===
In 2018, with interest from Chelsea, Paris Saint-Germain and Atlético Madrid, Drăgușin transferred to Italian club Juventus for a fee of €260,000. Initially assigned as an under-17 player, he quickly moved to the under-19 team. On 25 January 2020, midway through the 2019–20 Serie C season, Drăgușin made his debut for Juventus U23 against Pro Patria by coming on as a 36th-minute substitute for Raffaele Alcibiade.

On 8 November, he was called up to the senior squad by Andrea Pirlo for a Serie A fixture against Lazio. He made his club and European debut on 2 December, appearing as a substitute in a 3–0 home victory over Dynamo Kyiv in the UEFA Champions League group stage. Drăgușin's league debut was made 11 days later, being brought on in the 90th minute for Matthijs de Ligt in a 3–1 away win over Genoa.

On 13 January 2021, Drăgușin started his first match in the Coppa Italia, as his side defeated Genoa 3–2 after extra time. His first career goal came for the under-23s on 13 February 2021, in a 3–0 away victory over AlbinoLeffe. In April, Drăgușin's performances earned him a four-year contract extension at Juventus.

==== Loans to Sampdoria and Salernitana ====
On 31 August 2021, Drăgușin was sent out on loan to fellow Serie A club Sampdoria for one season. He recorded his debut on 22 October, in a 2–1 league win over Spezia in which he replaced injured Valerio Verre in the 19th minute. Five days later, he played the full 90 minutes in a 1–3 loss to Atalanta.

On 31 January 2022, after his loan at Sampdoria was prematurely interrupted, Drăgușin moved to Salernitana on loan for the remainder of the season. He made his debut for them on 7 February, starting in a 2–2 draw to Spezia.

=== Genoa ===
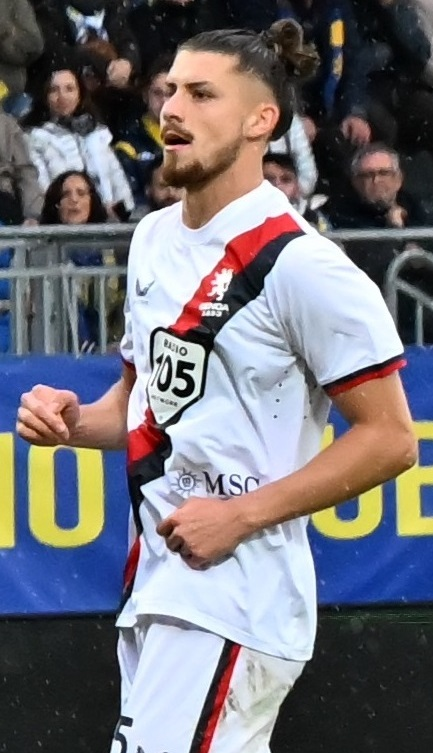
Drăgușin playing for Genoa in 2023

On 14 July 2022, Drăgușin was loaned out to Serie B side Genoa with an option to buy. On 25 January 2023, his agent announced that the permanent transfer clause had been triggered after he met several objectives, with the fee being around €5.5 million plus €1.8 million in conditional bonuses. He amassed 40 appearances and four goals in all competitions during the 2022–23 season, as Genoa finished second in the league and earned direct promotion to the Serie A.

Drăgușin scored his first goal in the latter competition on 10 November 2023, in a 1–0 home win over Hellas Verona. On 21 December, he was unveiled as the winner of the 2023 Romanian Footballer of the Year award by the Gazeta Sporturilor newspaper. Eight days later, he equalised by netting a header in a 1–1 home draw against Inter Milan.

=== Tottenham Hotspur ===
On 11 January 2024, amid reports of transfer offers from Tottenham Hotspur and Bayern Munich, Drăgușin joined the former by signing a contract until June 2030. The guaranteed €25 million (£21.5 million) transfer fee turned him into the most expensive Romanian footballer, surpassing the €22.5m (£15.8m) record fee for Adrian Mutu's transfer from Parma to Chelsea in 2003. Genoa could also receive another €5 million (£4.3 million) in add-ons.

Drăgușin made his Premier League debut on 14 January 2024, coming on as an 85th-minute substitute for Oliver Skipp in a 2–2 draw against Manchester United. He made his first start for Tottenham in a 3–0 away loss to Fulham on 16 March.

On 26 September 2024, Drăgușin was sent off seven minutes into his Europa League debut, a 3–0 win over Qarabağ in the opening fixture of the league phase. On 30 January 2025, he suffered an ACL injury in his right knee during a match against Elfsborg in the same competition. Drăgușin was sidelined for the rest of the campaign, receiving a winner's medal after Tottenham won the Europa League final against Manchester United in May.

Drăgușin returned to first team training in October 2025, playing his first minutes of football with the under-21 side in a behind-closed-doors friendly against Leyton Orient on 12 November. Following a second behind-closed-doors friendly on 2 December against Dagenham & Redbridge, Drăgușin made his first official appearance on 28 December coming on as a substitute in the 85th minute of a 1–0 league win over Crystal Palace in which he almost scored.

==== Loan to Fiorentina ====
On 8 July 2026, Drăgușin moved to Serie A side Fiorentina on loan, with the agreement including an option to buy that would become effective upon the fulfilment of certain conditions.

== International career ==
=== Youth ===
Drăgușin was selected by manager Adrian Mutu for the 2021 UEFA European Under-21 Championship, having previously made two appearances for Romania in the qualifiers. He only featured once in the final tournament, as he replaced injured Alex Pașcanu in the 63rd minute of a goalless draw with Germany.

=== Senior ===
Drăgușin was called up to the Romania senior team for the first time in March 2022, making his debut on 25 March by coming on in the 88th minute of a 0–1 friendly loss to Greece. The following year, he started in all ten matches of the Euro 2024 qualifiers, helping his nation top Group I with a single defeat by Belgium. Later, they got knocked out of the Euros by the Netherlands in a 3–0 defeat.

On 7 June 2024, Drăgușin was named in Romania's squad for Euro 2024. He started in all four matches of the tournament, forming a defensive partnership with Andrei Burcă, as the nation won its group but was eliminated by the Netherlands in the round of 16.

Drăgușin scored his first senior international goal for Romania on 12 October 2024, in a 3–0 away defeat of Cyprus counting for the 2024–25 edition of the Nations League.

== Style of play ==
A tall and physical centre-back, Drăgușin has cited Virgil van Dijk as a point of reference, with whom he has since been compared for his confidence in possession and positional sense. Drăgușin has also played as a right-back on occasion.

== Career statistics ==
=== Club ===
As of match played 8 November 2026

Appearances and goals by club, season and competition
| Club | Season | League | | | National cup (Note: Includes Coppa Italia Serie C, Coppa Italia, FA Cup) | | League cup (Note: Includes EFL Cup) | | Europe | | Other | | Total | |
| Club | Season | Division | Apps | Goals | Apps | Goals | Apps | Goals | Apps | Goals | Apps | Goals | Apps | Goals |
|---|---|---|---|---|---|---|---|---|---|---|---|---|---|---|
| Juventus U23 | 2019–20 | Serie C | 2 | 0 | 2 | 0 | — | | — | | 1 (Note: Appearances in Serie C promotion play-offs) | 0 | 5 | 0 |
| Juventus U23 | 2020–21 | Serie C | 8 | 1 | 0 | 0 | — | | — | | 2 | 0 | 10 | 1 |
| Juventus U23 | Total | | 10 | 1 | 2 | 0 | — | | — | | 3 | 0 | 15 | 1 |
| Juventus | 2020–21 | Serie A | 1 | 0 | 2 | 0 | — | | 1 (Note: Appearance in UEFA Champions League) | 0 | 0 | 0 | 4 | 0 |
| Sampdoria (loan) | 2021–22 | Serie A | 13 | 0 | 2 | 0 | — | | — | | — | | 15 | 0 |
| Salernitana (loan) | 2021–22 | Serie A | 7 | 0 | — | | — | | — | | — | | 7 | 0 |
| Genoa (loan) | 2022–23 | Serie B | 38 | 4 | 2 | 0 | — | | — | | — | | 40 | 4 |
| Genoa | 2023–24 | Serie A | 19 | 2 | 3 | 0 | — | | — | | — | | 22 | 2 |
| Genoa | Total | | 57 | 6 | 5 | 0 | — | | — | | — | | 62 | 6 |
| Tottenham Hotspur | 2023–24 | Premier League | 9 | 0 | 0 | 0 | — | | — | | — | | 9 | 0 |
| Tottenham Hotspur | 2024–25 | Premier League | 16 | 0 | 1 | 0 | 4 | 0 | 7 (Note: Appearances in UEFA Europa League) | 0 | — | | 28 | 0 |
| Tottenham Hotspur | 2025–26 | Premier League | 10 | 0 | 0 | 0 | 0 | 0 | 1 | 0 | 0 | 0 | 11 | 0 |
| Tottenham Hotspur | Total | | 35 | 0 | 1 | 0 | 4 | 0 | 8 | 0 | 0 | 0 | 48 | 0 |
| Fiorentina (loan) | 2026–27 | Serie A | 11 | 0 | 2 | 0 | — | | — | | — | | 13 | 0 |
| Career total | | | 134 | 7 | 14 | 0 | 4 | 0 | 9 | 0 | 3 | 0 | 164 | 7 |

=== International ===
As of match played 17 November 2026

Appearances and goals by national team and year
| National team | Year | Apps | Goals |
|---|---|---|---|
| Romania | 2022 | 3 | 0 |
| Romania | 2023 | 10 | 0 |
| Romania | 2024 | 14 | 1 |
| Romania | 2025 | 0 | 0 |
| Romania | 2026 | 7 | 0 |
| Total | | 34 | 1 |

Scores and results list Romania's goal tally first, score column indicates score after each Drăgușin goal.

List of international goals scored by Radu Drăgușin
| No. | Date | Venue | Cap | Opponent | Score | Result | Competition |
|---|---|---|---|---|---|---|---|
| 1 | 12 October 2024 | AEK Arena – Georgios Karapatakis, Larnaca, Cyprus | 24 | Cyprus | 3–0 | 3–0 | 2024–25 UEFA Nations League C |

== Honours ==
Juventus U23

- Coppa Italia Serie C: 2019–20

Juventus

- Coppa Italia: 2020–21
- Supercoppa Italiana: 2020

Tottenham Hotspur

- UEFA Europa League: 2024–25
- UEFA Super Cup runner-up: 2025

Individual

- Gazeta Sporturilor Romanian Footballer of the Year: 2023; runner-up: 2024
