= Filippo Ranocchia =

Italian footballer (born 2001)

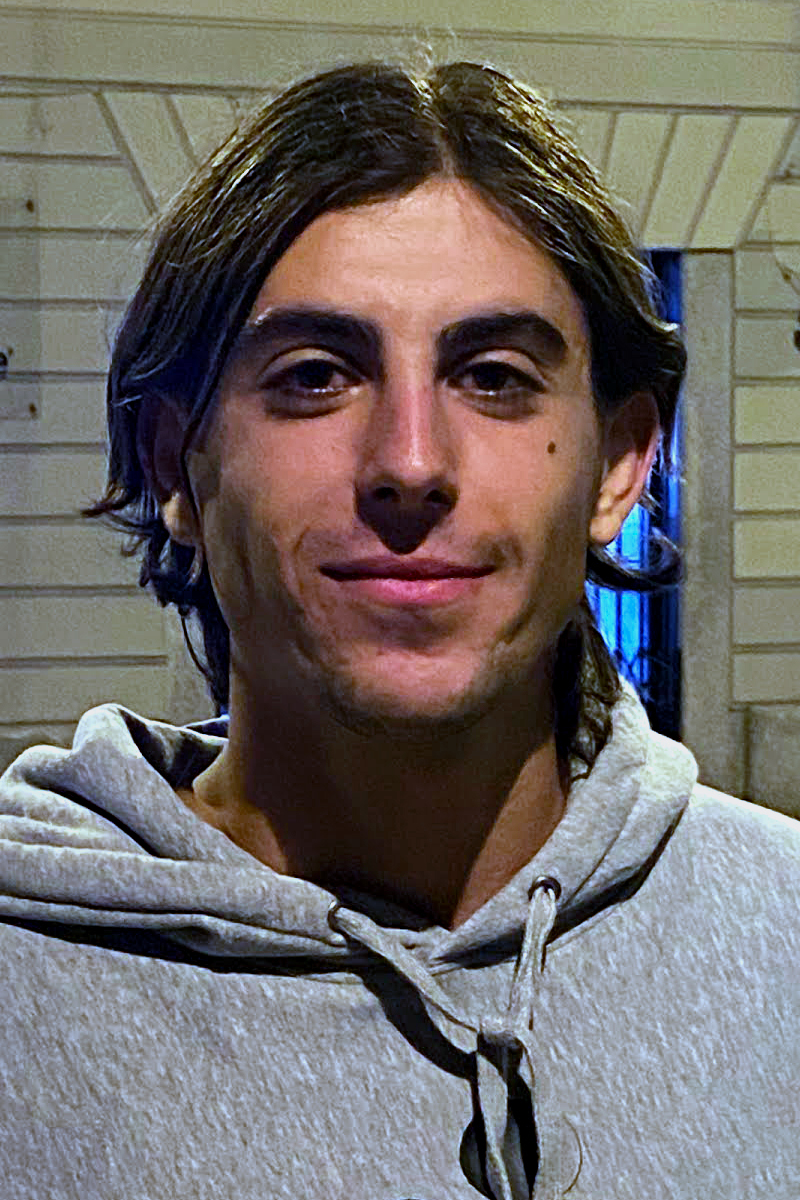
- Ranocchia in 2022

Personal information
- Date of birth: 14 May 2001 (age 25)
- Place of birth: Perugia, Italy
- Height: 1.86 m (6 ft 1 in)
- Position: Midfielder

Team information
- Current team: Palermo
- Number: 10

Youth career
- 2010–2013: Monte Malbe
- 2013–2019: Perugia
- 2019–2020: Juventus

Senior career*
Years	Team	Apps	(Gls)
2019–2024	Juventus	0	(0)
2019	→ Perugia (loan)	1	(0)
2020–2021	→ Juventus U23 (res.)	30	(3)
2021–2022	→ Vicenza (loan)	30	(1)
2022–2023	→ Monza (loan)	14	(1)
2023–2024	→ Empoli (loan)	9	(0)
2024–	Palermo	82	(11)

International career^{‡}
2021	Italy U20	1	(0)
2021–2022	Italy U21	5	(0)
- * Club domestic league appearances and goals as of 12 May 2026 ‡ National team caps and goals as of 19 November 2022

Filippo Ranocchia (born 14 May 2001) is an Italian professional footballer who plays as a midfielder for Serie B club Palermo.

== Club career ==
=== Early career ===
Ranocchia began his youth career at Scuola Calcio Monte Malbe, playing between the Pulcini (under-11) and Esordienti (under-13). He joined Perugia's youth sector in 2013, scouted by Roberto Goretti. During the 2017–18 season, Ranocchia played 19 games for the Primavera (under-19) team; he signed his first professional contract on 16 July 2018.

=== Juventus ===
==== Loan to Perugia and Juventus U23 ====
On 30 January 2019, Ranocchia moved to Juventus, and re-joined Perugia on a two-year loan. He made his Serie B debut for Perugia on 30 March 2019, in a game against Livorno as an 88th-minute substitute for Marcello Falzerano.

On 2 September 2019, the loan was terminated early and Ranocchia joined Juventus' youth squad. In 2019–20 Ranocchia played one game for Serie C side Juventus U23 – the reserve team of Juventus – on 25 January 2020, in a 3–2 defeat to Pro Patria.

He became a permanent member of Juventus U23 in the 2020–21 season, scoring first senior career goal in a 2–1 away win against Giana Erminio on 3 October 2020. Ranocchia played 31 games that season, scoring four goals.

==== Various loans ====
On 31 August 2021, Ranocchia was loaned to Vicenza. He made his debut on 12 September, in a 2–1 defeat against Cosenza. On 30 April 2022, Ranocchia scored the decisive goal in the 13th minute of added time in a 2–1 win against Serie B leaders Lecce. He ended the 2021–22 season with 32 league games (30 in the regular season). Ranocchia renewed with Juventus on 20 July until 2026.

On 21 July 2022, newly-promoted Serie A side Monza signed Ranocchia on a one-year loan, with option to buy and counter option in favour of Juventus. He made his Serie A debut for Monza on 14 August, as a starter in a 2–1 defeat to Torino. On 22 October, Ranocchia scored his first Serie A goal, via a direct free kick in a 4–1 defeat away to AC Milan.

On 17 July 2023, Juventus loaned him to Empoli with option and counteroption to buy.

=== Palermo ===
On 18 January 2024, Ranocchia signed a contract with Palermo until 30 June 2028.

== International career ==
In 2015, Ranocchia was called up for a training camp with the Italy national under-15 team. He made his debut with Italy U21 on 8 October 2021, in a 2023 UEFA European Under-21 Championship qualification game against Bosnia and Herzegovina. In May 2022, Ranocchia was called up by head coach Roberto Mancini for a training session with the senior national team.

== Style of play ==
Ranocchia is a midfielder who mainly plays as a mezzala, but can also play as a deep-lying playmaker. His main characteristics are his ball control, dribbling and long-distance shooting; he is also ambipedal, as he can use both feet with equal ability.

== Career statistics ==
=== Club ===
As of match played 5 April 2026

Appearances and goals by club, season and competition
Club	Season	League			Coppa Italia		Other		Total	
Club	Season	Division	Apps	Goals	Apps	Goals	Apps	Goals	Apps	Goals
Juventus	2018–19	Serie A	—		—		—		0	0
Juventus	2019–20	Serie A	—		—		—		0	0
Juventus	2020–21	Serie A	0	0	0	0	0	0	0	0
Juventus	2021–22	Serie A	0	0	—		—		0	0
Juventus	2022–23	Serie A	—		—		—		0	0
Juventus	Total		0	0	0	0	0	0	0	0
Perugia (loan)	2018–19	Serie B	1	0	0	0	1 (Note: Appearances in Serie B promotion play-offs)	0	2	0
Perugia (loan)	2019–20	Serie B	0	0	2	0	—		2	0
Perugia (loan)	Total		1	0	2	0	1	0	4	0
Juventus U23 (res.)	2019–20	Serie C	1	0	—		—		1	0
Juventus U23 (res.)	2020–21	Serie C	29	3	—		2 (Note: Appearances in Serie C promotion play-offs)	1	31	4
Juventus U23 (res.)	Total		30	3	0	0	2	1	32	4
Vicenza (loan)	2021–22	Serie B	30	1	—		2 (Note: Appearances in Serie B relegation play-offs)	0	32	1
Monza (loan)	2022–23	Serie A	14	1	2	0	—		16	1
Empoli (loan)	2023–24	Serie A	9	0	0	0	—		9	0
Palermo	2023–24	Serie B	15	4	0	0	—		15	4
Palermo	2024–25	Serie B	35	1	2	0	1	0	38	1
Palermo	2025–26	Serie B	28	5	2	0	—		30	5
Palermo	Total		78	10	4	0	1	0	83	10
Career total			162	15	8	0	6	1	176	16

== Honours ==
Juventus

- Coppa Italia: 2020–21
- Supercoppa Italiana: 2020
