= Brighenti =

Brighenti is an Italian surname. Notable people with the surname include:

- Andrea Brighenti (born 1987), Italian footballer
- Nicolò Brighenti (born 1989), Italian footballer
- Sergio Brighenti (1932–2022), Italian footballer and manager
