= Nicolò Fagioli =

Italian footballer (born 2001)

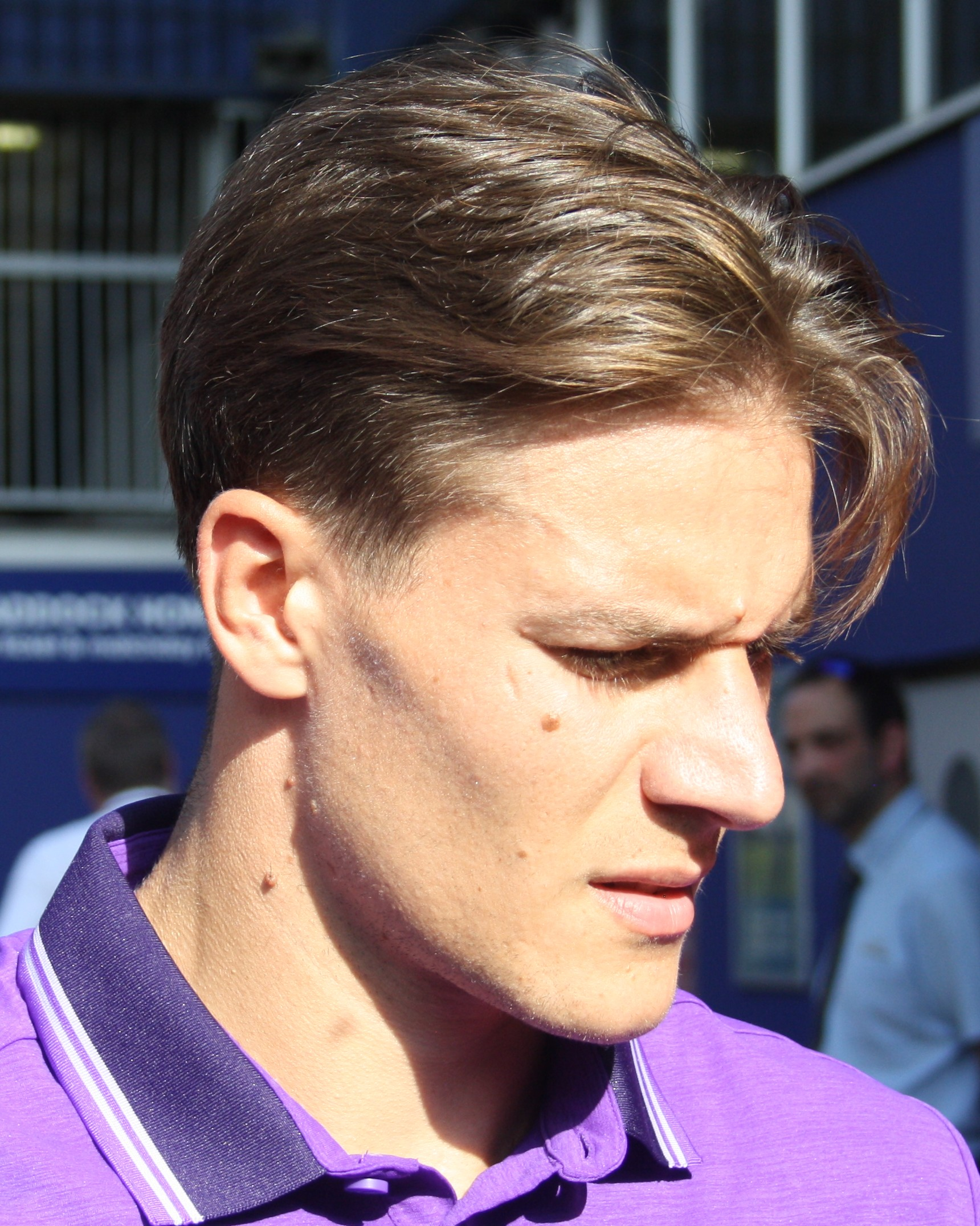
- Fagioli with Fiorentina in 2026

Personal information
- Date of birth: 12 February 2001 (age 25)
- Place of birth: Piacenza, Italy
- Height: 1.78 m (5 ft 10 in)
- Position: Midfielder

Team information
- Current team: Fiorentina
- Number: 44

Youth career
- 2008–2011: Piacenza
- 2011–2015: Cremonese
- 2015–2020: Juventus

Senior career*
Years	Team	Apps	(Gls)
2018–2021	Juventus U23	25	(2)
2021–2025	Juventus	52	(3)
2021–2022	→ Cremonese (loan)	33	(3)
2025	→ Fiorentina (loan)	15	(1)
2025–	Fiorentina	40	(2)

International career^{‡}
2016	Italy U15	2	(0)
2017–2018	Italy U17	14	(3)
2018–2019	Italy U19	20	(2)
2021–2023	Italy U21	7	(0)
2022–	Italy	10	(0)
Medal record
Men's football
Representing Italy
UEFA European Under-17 Championship
Runner-up	2018 England
- * Club domestic league appearances and goals as of 17:01, 18 October 2026 (UTC) ‡ National team caps and goals as of 15 November 2026

Nicolò Fagioli (born 12 February 2001) is an Italian professional footballer who plays as a midfielder for Serie A club Fiorentina and the Italy national team.

== Club career ==
=== Youth career ===
In 2015, Fagioli moved to Juventus' youth setup, playing the 2015–16 season with the under-17s. Fagioli was early promoted to the Primavera (under-19s) side in the 2017–18 season, in which he scored 13 goals in 25 games. In 2018, Fagioli was included in The Guardian's best 60 world talents.

=== First team breakthrough ===
Fagioli made his Serie C debut for Juventus U23, the reserve team of Juventus, on 24 September 2018, in a 4–0 defeat against Carrarese, which was his only game of the 2018–19 season. On 27 January 2019, Fagioli was first called up to the first team for a Serie A match against Lazio. On 27 June 2020, Fagioli won the Coppa Italia Serie C after a 2–1 win against Ternana in the final. In 2019–20, Fagioli played five league games, helping Juventus U23 reach the promotion play-offs, where he played one game against Padova.

On 1 November, Fagioli scored his first goal for Juventus U23 in a 1–1 home draw against Lecco. Fagioli ended the 2020–21 season with two goals scored in 20 appearances for Juventus U23. On 27 January 2021, Fagioli made his debut for Juventus, playing as a starter in a 4–0 Coppa Italia win over SPAL. His Serie A debut came on 22 February 2021, coming on as a substitute for Rodrigo Bentancur in the 69th minute in a 3–0 home win against Crotone.

On 31 August 2021, Fagioli was sent on a one-year loan to Serie B side Cremonese. On 12 September, Fagioli debuted for Cremonese in a 2–0 win against Cittadella. Seven days later, Fagioli scored his first goal for Cremonese in a 2–1 against Parma. Fagioli ended the season with a total of three goals in 33 appearances, and helped Cremonese to be promoted in Serie A.

On 10 August 2022, Juventus announced that Fagioli had renewed his contract until 2026. On 14 September, he made his Champions League debut in a 2–1 defeat against Benfica. On 29 October, he scored his first Serie A goal in a 1–0 away win over Lecce, with a curling shot at the 70th minute. Prior to this goal, he had played only 39 league minutes. Eight days later, he replicated against Inter Milan, netting the 2–0 goal. Afterwards, Fagioli emerged to become one of the team's best players; he also won the Serie A Under-23 Player of the season. On 18 May 2023, Fagioli fractured his right collarbone in a UEFA Europa League match against Sevilla, ruling him out for two months.

On 17 October 2023, the Italian Football Federation imposed a seven-month ban on Fagioli for violating betting rules, and he would not return to playing until 21 May 2024, coming off the bench against Bologna.

=== Fiorentina ===
On 4 February 2025, Fagioli was loaned to Fiorentina with an obligation to buy.

== International career ==
Fagioli was a starter in most matches for Italy U17 at the 2018 UEFA European Under-17 Championship. In the final against the Netherlands, he came on as a substitute in the 55th minute and provided two assists in the next eight minutes to help his team come back from 0–1 down to 2–1 victory. Netherlands eventually equalized and beat Italy in the penalty shootout. With Italy U19, Fagioli took part in the 2019 UEFA European Under-19 Championship. On 3 September 2021, he made his debut with the Italy U21 squad, playing as a substitute in the qualifying match won 3–0 against Luxembourg. On 16 November 2022, days after receiving his first senior call-up for the Italy national football team by head coach Roberto Mancini, Fagioli debuted in a friendly match against Albania.

== Style of play ==
Fagioli is a trequartista, mainly fielded as fantasista. Fagioli can also move down the pitch as a defensive midfielder or as a central midfielder, acting as a deep-lying playmaker in the regista role. During his career, Fagioli has also played as a second striker, mezz'ala, or playmaker. Fagioli has also often been compared to Andrea Pirlo due to his playing style. His main qualities are his vision, technique, and long passing ability, although he is also an effective ball-winner.

== Career statistics ==
=== Club ===
As of match played 18 October 2026

Appearances and goals by club, season and competition
Club	Season	League			Coppa Italia		Europe		Other		Total	
Club	Season	Division	Apps	Goals	Apps	Goals	Apps	Goals	Apps	Goals	Apps	Goals
Juventus U23	2018–19	Serie C	1	0	—		—		1 (Note: Appearance(s) in Coppa Italia Serie C)	0	2	0
Juventus U23	2019–20	Serie C	5	0	—		—		5 (Note: Four appearances in Coppa Italia Serie C, one appearance in Serie C promotion play-offs)	0	10	0
Juventus U23	2020–21	Serie C	19	2	—		—		1	0	20	2
Juventus U23	Total		25	2	—		—		7	0	32	2
Juventus	2020–21	Serie A	1	0	1	0	0	0	0	0	2	0
Juventus	2022–23	Serie A	26	3	3	0	8 (Note: Two appearances in UEFA Champions League, six appearances in UEFA Europa League)	0	—		37	3
Juventus	2023–24	Serie A	8	0	0	0	—		—		8	0
Juventus	2024–25	Serie A	17	0	0	0	4 (Note: Appearances in UEFA Champions League)	0	1 (Note: Appearance in Supercoppa Italiana)	0	22	0
Juventus	Total		52	3	4	0	12	0	1	0	69	3
Cremonese (loan)	2021–22	Serie B	33	3	0	0	—		—		33	3
Fiorentina (loan)	2024–25	Serie A	15	1	—		6 (Note: Appearances in UEFA Conference League)	1	—		21	2
Fiorentina	2025–26	Serie A	33	2	1	0	11	1	—		45	3
Fiorentina	2026–27	Serie A	7	0	1	0	—		—		8	0
Fiorentina	Fiorentina total		55	3	2	0	17	2	—		74	5
Career total			165	11	6	0	29	2	8	0	208	13

=== International ===
As of match played 15 November 2026

Appearances and goals by national team and year
National team	Year	Apps	Goals
Italy	2022	1	0
Italy	2023	0	0
Italy	2024	6	0
Italy	2025	0	0
Italy	2026	3	0
Total		10	0

== Honours ==
Juventus U23

- Coppa Italia Serie C: 2019–20

Juventus

- Supercoppa Italiana: 2020

Individual

- Serie A Best Under-23: 2022–23
