= Filippo Delli Carri =

Italian footballer (born 1999)

Personal information
- Date of birth: 3 May 1999 (age 27)
- Place of birth: Turin, Italy
- Height: 1.91 m (6 ft 3 in)
- Position: Defender

Team information
- Current team: Sampdoria (on loan from Monza)
- Number: 15

Youth career
- –2017: Pescara
- 2017–2018: Juventus

Senior career*
Years	Team	Apps	(Gls)
2016–2017	Pescara	0	(0)
2017–2022	Juventus	0	(0)
2018–2019	→ Rieti (loan)	24	(0)
2019–2021	→ Juventus U23 (res.)	30	(0)
2021–2022	→ Salernitana (loan)	5	(0)
2022–2023	Como	0	(0)
2023	→ Padova (loan)	16	(2)
2023–2025	Padova	74	(9)
2025–	Monza	33	(2)
2026–	→ Sampdoria (loan)	0	(0)
- * Club domestic league appearances and goals as of 1 September 2026

Filippo Delli Carri (born 3 May 1999) is an Italian professional footballer who plays as a defender for Serie B club Sampdoria, on loan from Monza.

== Career ==
=== Pescara ===
He is the product of the youth teams of Pescara, he played for their Under-19 squad in the 2015–16 and 2016–17 seasons. He made several bench appearances for Pescara's senior team in the 2016–17 Serie A, but did not appear on the field. He made his debut for Pescara as a starter and played full 120 minutes in a 2017–18 Coppa Italia 5–3 extra time victory over Triestina on 6 August 2017.

=== Juventus ===
On 31 August 2017, he joined Juventus. He played for their under-19 squad in the Campionato Primavera 1 in the 2017–18 season, without any call-ups to the senior squad.

==== Loan to Rieti ====
On 1 October 2018, Serie C club Rieti officially announced that Delli Carri joined them on a season-long loan. He made his Serie C debut for them earlier, on 29 September 2018 in a game against Cavese as a last-minute substitute for Thomas Vasiliou.

==== Juventus U23 ====
On 1 September 2019, Delli Carri played his first game for Serie C side Juventus U23, the reserve team of Juventus, in a 3–2 defeat against Siena.

==== Loan to Salernitana ====
On 31 August 2021, he joined Serie A side Salernitana on a season-long loan. On 11 December he made his Serie A debut for the club in a 4–0 defeat against Fiorentina.

=== Como ===
On 5 July 2022, Delli Carri signed a two-year contract with Como.

=== Padova ===
On 10 January 2023, Delli Carri was loaned to Padova for the rest of the season. On 28 June 2023, Delli Carri agreed on a three-year contract to return to Padova on a permanent basis.

=== Monza ===
On 11 August 2025, Delli Carri signed with Serie B club Monza for three seasons, with an automatic extension clause, conditional on performance.

=== Sampdoria ===
On 1 September 2026, Delli Carri was sent on a one-year loan to Sampdoria, with an option for purchase that becomes an obbligation under certain conditions.

== Personal life ==
Delli Carri's father Daniele played in the Serie A for Fiorentina, Siena, Torino, Piacenza and Genoa in the 1990s and 2000s.

== Career statistics ==
=== Club ===
As of match played 23 August 2023

Appearances and goals by club, season and competition
Club	Season	League			National Cup (Note: Includes Coppa Italia, Coppa Italia Serie C)		Europe		Other		Total	
Club	Season	Division	Apps	Goals	Apps	Goals	Apps	Goals	Apps	Goals	Apps	Goals
Pescara	2017–18	Serie B	0	0	1	0	—		—		1	0
Rieti (loan)	2018–19	Serie C	24	0	0	0	—		—		24	0
Juventus Next Gen	2019–20	Serie C	7	0	4	0	—		—		11	0
Juventus Next Gen	2020–21	Serie C	23	0	0	0	—		1 (Note: Appearance(s) in Serie C play-off)	0	24	0
Juventus Next Gen	Total		30	0	4	0	—		1	0	35	0
Salernitana (loan)	2021–22	Serie A	5	0	1	0	—		—		6	0
Padova (loan)	2022–23	Serie C	16	2	0	0	—		2	0	18	2
Career total			75	2	6	0	—		3	0	84	2

== Honours ==
Juventus U23

- Coppa Italia Serie C: 2019–20
