= Marco Da Graca =

Italian footballer (born 2002)

Personal information
- Full name: Cosimo Marco Da Graca
- Date of birth: 1 May 2002 (age 24)
- Place of birth: Palermo, Italy
- Height: 1.85 m (6 ft 1 in)
- Position: Striker

Team information
- Current team: Novara
- Number: 20

Youth career
- 2012–2014: Calcio Sicilia
- 2014–2019: Palermo
- 2018–2019: → Juventus (loan)
- 2019–2021: Juventus

Senior career*
Years	Team	Apps	(Gls)
2021–2025	Juventus	0	(0)
2020–2023	→ Juventus Next Gen (Note: The team's name was changed from Juventus U23 to Juventus Next Gen in August 2022.) (res.)	47	(4)
2023–2024	→ Amorebieta (loan)	11	(0)
2024–2025	→ Juventus Next Gen (res.)	20	(2)
2025–	Novara	36	(11)

International career
2018	Italy U16	8	(0)
2020	Italy U18	1	(0)
- * Club domestic league appearances and goals as of 30 April 2026

Cosimo Marco Da Graca (Portuguese: Cosimo Marco da Graça; born 1 May 2002) is an Italian professional footballer who plays as a striker for Serie C Group A club Novara.

A forward of Cape Verdean origin, Da Graca made his first steps at Calcio Sicilia and at Palermo, the team of his native city. In 2018, he joined Juventus' youth set-up. In 2020–21, he made his debut for both Juventus U23 and Juventus first-team. Promoted permanently to their reserve team playing in Serie C, he was loaned to Basque club Amorebieta in summer 2023. After the loan was interrupted in January 2024, he spent an entire year playing again for Juventus Next Gen. He joined Novara in January 2025 on a permanent basis.

== Club career ==
=== Youth career ===
Da Graca began his youth career at Sicilia aged 10, before moving to Palermo's youth sector aged 12. He stayed there until 2018, when he moved to Juventus on loan, before making the move permanent in 2019 for €600,000.

=== Juventus ===
On 28 October 2020, Da Graca made his Serie C debut for Juventus U23, the reserve team of Juventus, in a 2–1 defeat to Como. He scored his first goal for Juventus U23 on 7 March as a second-half substitute, scoring the game's sole goal in the 85th minute against Grosseto. He was first called up to the senior side on 2 December 2020, as an unused substitute in a UEFA Champions League group stage game against Dynamo Kyiv. Da Graca played his first game for Juventus on 27 January 2021, coming on as a substitute in a 4–0 win over SPAL in the Coppa Italia. On 15 April, Juventus renewed Da Graca's contract until June 2024.

Da Graca started the 2021–22 season with some muscular injuries. His debut in the season came on 24 October, coming on as substitute in the 71st minute in a 1–1 home draw against Pro Sesto; he also scored the equalizing goal in the 89th minute. On 8 December, Da Graca made his UEFA Champions League debut in a 1–0 win against Malmö, coming on as substitute in the 89th minute. On 17 January 2022, Da Graca was ruled out for a month to undergo treatment after it was diagnosed that he suffered from an irregular heartbeat. Da Graca's first mach after his injury came on 23 February, in a match against Pro Patria won 1–0. On 12 May, he scored a 30th-minute decider in Juventus U23's 1–0 away win to Renate in the third round of play-offs, allowing his team to access the further round.

==== Loan to Amorebieta ====
On 30 August 2023, Da Graca extended his contract with Juventus until 2025, and subsequently joined Spanish side Amorebieta on loan for the rest of the season.

After failing to break through the starting eleven of the first team, both parties agreed upon cutting short the loan deal, with Da Graca returning to Juventus on 11 January 2024.

=== Novara ===
On 24 January 2025, Da Graca signed a two-and-a-half-year contract with Serie C club Novara.

== International career ==
Eligible to represent Cape Verde through his father, Da Graca has played for Italy at youth level. He went on trial for the under-15s, before playing eight games for the under-16s in 2018.

== Style of play ==
A left-footed player, Da Graca started out as a winger, before becoming a centre-forward because of his height of 1.85 m (6 ft 1 in) and his physicality.

== Personal life ==
Da Graca was born in Palermo, Italy, to a father from Praia, Cape Verde. He is of Portuguese descent.

== Career statistics ==
=== Club ===
As of match played 25 April 2025

Appearances and goals by club, season and competition
Club	Season	League			National cup		Continental		Other		Total	
Club	Season	Division	Apps	Goals	Apps	Goals	Apps	Goals	Apps	Goals	Apps	Goals
Juventus Next Gen	2020–21	Serie C	7	1	—		—		0	0	7	1
Juventus Next Gen	2021–22	Serie C	17	3	—		—		7 (Note: One appearance in Coppa Italia Serie C, six appearances one goal in Serie C promotion play-offs)	1	24	4
Juventus Next Gen	2022–23	Serie C	23	0	—		—		5 (Note: Appearance(s) in Coppa Italia Serie C)	1	28	1
Juventus Next Gen	2023–24	Serie C	10	0	—		—		0	0	10	2
Juventus Next Gen	2024–25	Serie C	13	2	—		—		1	0	13	2
Juventus Next Gen	Total		70	5	0	0	0	0	13	2	83	7
Juventus	2020–21	Serie A	0	0	1	0	0	0	0	0	1	0
Juventus	2021–22	Serie A	0	0	0	0	1 (Note: Appearance in UEFA Champions League)	0	0	0	1	0
Juventus	Total		0	0	1	0	1	0	0	0	2	0
Amorebieta (loan)	2023–24	Segunda División	12	0	0	0	0	0	0	0	12	0
Novara	2024–25	Serie C	10	2	0	0	0	0	0	0	10	2
Career total			92	7	1	0	1	0	12	2	106	9

== Honours ==
Juventus

- Coppa Italia: 2020–21
