= Alessandro Favalli =

Italian footballer (born 1992)

Personal information
- Date of birth: 15 November 1992 (age 34)
- Place of birth: Cremona, Italy
- Height: 1.82 m (6 ft 0 in)
- Position: Left back

Team information
- Current team: Carpenedolo

Youth career
- Cremonese

Senior career*
| Years | Team | Apps | (Gls) |
| 2010–2013 | Cremonese | 34 | (0) |
| 2012–2013 | → Cesena (loan) | 3 | (0) |
| 2013 | Parma | 0 | (0) |
| 2013–2014 | → Gorica (loan) | 24 | (0) |
| 2014–2015 | → Cremonese (loan) | 27 | (0) |
| 2015–2017 | Padova | 65 | (6) |
| 2017–2018 | Ternana | 33 | (1) |
| 2018–2020 | Catanzaro | 43 | (1) |
| 2020 | Reggiana | 3 | (0) |
| 2020–2021 | Perugia | 20 | (1) |
| 2021–2023 | Siena | 59 | (2) |
| 2023– | Carpenedolo | | |

International career
| 2011–2012 | Italy U20 | 4 | (0) |
- * Club domestic league appearances and goals as of 14 October 2026

Alessandro Favalli (born 15 November 1992) is an Italian footballer who plays as a left back for Carpenedolo.

== Club career ==
Favalli started his professional career at Cremonese. He was the member of Allievi U17 team in the 2008–09 season. Favalli made his debut during the 2010–11 Lega Pro Prima Divisione.

On 18 July 2012, he was exchanged with Milan Đurić, which Favalli joined Cesena in temporary deal and Djuric to Cremonese also in a temporary deal.

He had limited chance to play and suffered from injury.

On 13 July 2013, Favalli joined Parma in co-ownership deal;, as a direct cashless swap with Andrea Brighenti. Both 50% registration rights of the players were valued for €250,000. He left for Slovenian club ND Gorica on 1 August, which the paperwork finalized on 7 August.

On 20 June 2014, the co-ownership deal was renewed, as well as Favalli would return to Cremonese for 2014–15 Lega Pro.

On 18 August 2015, the player signed for Calcio Padova in Lega Pro.

On 10 January 2020, he signed a 1.5-year contract with Serie C club Reggiana.

On 5 October 2020 he moved to Perugia.

On 16 August 2021 he joined Siena.

== International career ==
Favalli played two matches in the 2011–12 Four Nations Tournament and two friendlies for Italy national under-20 football team.

== Personal life ==
On 6 March 2020, Favalli tested positive for COVID-19, becoming the second confirmed case in Italian football.
