= Matteo Bucosse =

Italian footballer (born 2002)

Personal information
- Date of birth: 23 October 2002 (age 24)
- Place of birth: Macerata, Italy
- Position: Goalkeeper

Team information
- Current team: Tolentino
- Number: 2

Youth career
- 2009–2019: Montemilone Pollenza

Senior career*
Years	Team	Apps	(Gls)
2019–	Tolentino	15	(0)
2020–2021	→ Juventus U23 (loan)	5	(0)
- * Club domestic league appearances and goals as of 2 May 2021

Matteo Bucosse (born 23 October 2002) is an Italian professional footballer who plays as a goalkeeper for Italian club Tolentino.

== Career ==
Bucosse began playing youth football at Montemilione Pollenza in 2009, before moving to Serie D club Tolentino in 2019. He played 18 games in 2019–20, 15 in the league and three in the cup.

On 8 September 2020, Bucosse joined Serie C club Juventus U23, the reserve team of Juventus, on loan. He made his Serie C debut on 13 December 2020, in a 1–0 defeat to Alessandria.
