= Ferdinando Del Sole =

Italian footballer (born 1998)

Personal information
- Date of birth: 17 January 1998 (age 28)
- Place of birth: Naples, Italy
- Height: 1.75 m (5 ft 9 in)
- Position: Winger

Team information
- Current team: Foggia
- Number: 10

Youth career
- –2017: Pescara
- 2017–2018: Juventus

Senior career*
Years	Team	Apps	(Gls)
2017	Pescara	0	(0)
2017–2024	Juventus	0	(0)
2017–2018	→ Pescara (loan)	14	(0)
2018–2019	→ Pescara (loan)	13	(2)
2019–2020	→ Juve Stabia (loan)	3	(0)
2020–2021	→ Juventus U23 (res.)	20	(4)
2021–2022	→ Ancona-Matelica (loan)	24	(3)
2022–2023	→ Potenza (loan)	30	(2)
2023–2024	→ Latina (loan)	35	(4)
2024–2025	Pineto	21	(1)
2025	Giugliano	14	(8)
2025–2026	Ascoli	6	(1)
2026–	Foggia	0	(0)

International career
2017–2018	Italy U20	5	(0)
- * Club domestic league appearances and goals as of 27 September 2026

Ferdinando Del Sole (born 17 January 1998) is an Italian professional footballer who plays as a winger for Serie C Group C club Foggia.

== Club career ==
=== Pescara ===
Del Sole is a youth exponent from Pescara. He made his Serie B debut on 27 August 2017 against Foggia.

=== Loan to Juve Stabia ===
On 15 July 2019, he joined Serie B side Juve Stabia on loan from Juventus.

=== Juventus U23 ===
On 19 January 2020, Del Sole played his first game for Juventus U23, the reserve team of Juventus, in a 1–0 Serie C win against Arezzo.

=== Potenza ===
On 1 September 2022, Del Sole was loaned to Potenza for two seasons.

=== Pineto ===
On 4 July 2024, Del Sole signed a multi-year contract with Pineto.

=== Giugliano ===
On 16 January 2025, he joined Giugliano.

== Career statistics ==
=== Club ===
As of match played 23 September 2025

Appearances and goals by club, season and competition
Club	Season	League			Coppa Italia		Cotninental		Other		Total	
Club	Season	Division	Apps	Goals	Apps	Goals	Apps	Goals	Apps	Goals	Apps	Goals
Pescara	2016–17	Serie A	0	0	1	0	—		—		1	0
Pescara	2017–18	Serie B	1	0	2	3	—		—		3	3
Pescara	Total		1	0	3	3	—		—		4	3
Juventus	2017–18	Serie A	0	0	0	0	0	0	0	0	0	0
Juventus	2018–19	Serie A	0	0	0	0	0	0	0	0	0	0
Juventus	2019–20	Serie A	0	0	0	0	0	0	0	0	0	0
Juventus	2020–21	Serie A	0	0	0	0	0	0	0	0	0	0
Juventus	2021–22	Serie A	0	0	0	0	0	0	0	0	0	0
Juventus	2022–23	Serie A	0	0	0	0	0	0	—		0	0
Juventus	2023–24	Serie A	0	0	0	0	—		—		0	0
Juventus	Total		0	0	0	0	0	0	0	0	0	0
Pescara (loan)	2017–18	Serie B	13	0	0	0	—		—		13	0
Pescara (loan)	2018–19	Serie B	13	2	0	0	—		0	0	13	2
Juve Stabia (loan)	2019–20	Serie B	3	0	1	0	—		—		4	0
Juventus U23	2019–20	Serie C	6	2	—		—		3 (Note: Appearance(s) in Coppa Italia Serie C)	0	9	2
Juventus U23	2020–21	Serie C	14	2	—		—		—		14	2
Juventus U23	Total		20	4	—		—		3	0	23	4
Ancona-Matelica (loan)	2021–22	Serie C	24	3	—		—		2 (Note: One appearance in Coppa Italia Serie C; One appearance in Serie C Promotion play-offs)	0	26	3
Potenza (loan)	2022–23	Serie C	30	2	—		—		1	1	31	3
Latina (loan)	2023–24	Serie C	35	4	—		—		2 (Note: One appearance in Coppa Italia Serie C; One appearance in Serie C Promotion play-offs)	0	37	4
Pineto	2024–25	Serie C	21	1	—		—		0	0	21	1
Giugliano	2024–25	Serie C	15	8	—		—		1 (Note: Appearance(s) in Serie C Promotion play-offs)	0	16	8
Ascoli	2025–26	Serie C	6	1	—		—		1	0	7	1
Career total			181	26	4	3	0	0	10	1	195	30

== Honours ==
Juventus U23

- Coppa Italia Serie C: 2019–20
