= Davide De Marino =

Italian footballer (born 2000)

Personal information
- Date of birth: 17 July 2000 (age 26)
- Place of birth: Savigliano, Italy
- Height: 1.86 m (6 ft 1 in)
- Position: Defender

Team information
- Current team: Ternana
- Number: 33

Youth career
- 2016–2018: Pro Vercelli

Senior career*
Years	Team	Apps	(Gls)
2017–2021	Pro Vercelli	22	(0)
2021–2024	Juventus	0	(0)
2021–2022	→ Juventus U23 (res.)	13	(0)
2022	→ Pisa (loan)	0	(0)
2022–2023	→ Pescara (loan)	3	(0)
2023–2024	→ Virtus Francavilla (loan)	44	(0)
2024–2025	Pro Vercelli	29	(1)
2025–2026	Lumezzane	12	(0)
2026–	Ternana	3	(0)
- * Club domestic league appearances and goals as of 27 September 2026

Davide De Marino (born 17 March 2000) is an Italian professional footballer who plays as a defender for Serie D club Ternana.

== Career ==
=== Pro Vercelli ===
De Marino joined Pro Vercelli's youth team in 2016, making his senior debut on 18 May 2018, during the 2017–18 Serie B season, against Cittadella in a 2–0 away defeat. The following season, De Marino played six games in the Serie C, before being ruled out for almost two years due to two ACL injuries. He returned on 27 September 2020, during the 2020–21 Serie C season, in a 1–0 home win against Novara. De Marino finished the season with 15 league games.

=== Juventus U23 ===
On 16 January 2021, De Marino joined Serie C side Juventus U23 – the reserve team of Juventus – on a permanent deal. He made his debut the following day, playing as a starter in a 1–1 draw at home to Piacenza. De Marino was called up to the first-team squad on 6 March by coach Andrea Pirlo, for a home match against Lazio. On 25 April, De Marino suffered a third ACL injury. His first call up after recovery came on 4 December, for a match against Renate set to be played the following day.

==== Loans to Pisa, Pescara and Virtus Francavilla ====
On 31 January 2022, De Marino joined Pisa on loan with an option to buy. De Marino made 12 bench appearances without seeing the field. On 14 July 2022, De Marino was loaned to Pescara. He made three late substitute appearances for Pescara in league games and started twice in Coppa Italia Serie C. On 11 January 2023, he moved on a new loan to Virtus Francavilla.

=== Return to Pro Vercelli ===
On 19 July 2024, De Marino returned to Pro Vercelli.

== Career statistics ==
=== Club ===
As of match played 15 October 2022

Appearances and goals by club, season and competition
Club	Season	League			Coppa Italia		Other		Total	
Club	Season	Division	Apps	Goals	Apps	Goals	Apps	Goals	Apps	Goals
Pro Vercelli	2017–18	Serie B	1	0	0	0	—		1	0
Pro Vercelli	2018–19	Serie C	6	0	1	0	0	0	7	0
Pro Vercelli	2019–20	Serie C	0	0	0	0	0	0	0	0
Pro Vercelli	2020–21	Serie C	15	0	—		—		15	0
Pro Vercelli	Total		22	0	1	0	0	0	23	0
Juventus U23	2020–21	Serie C	13	0	—		0	0	13	0
Juventus U23	2021–22	Serie C	0	0	—		0	0	0	0
Juventus U23	Total		13	0	0	0	0	0	13	0
Pisa (loan)	2021–22	Serie B	0	0	0	0	0	0	0	0
Pescara (loan)	2022–23	Serie C	2	0	0	0	1	0	3	0
Career total			37	0	1	0	1	0	39	3
