= 2019–20 Juventus FC Under-23 season =

Juventus U23
2019–20 season
- Chairman: Andrea Agnelli
- Manager: Fabio Pecchia
- Stadium: Stadio Giuseppe Moccagatta
- Serie C: 10th
- Coppa Italia Serie C: Winners
- Top goalscorer: League: Dany Mota (7 goals); All: Dany Mota (8 goals)
| Home colours | Away colours | Third colours |

The 2019–20 season was the 2nd season of Juventus U23 and the club's 2nd consecutive season in the Serie C, the third level of Italian football. Juventus won their first trophy in their history: the Coppa Italia Serie C after beating 2–1 Ternana. Juventus U23 finished 10th in the regular season, and qualified for the first round of the promotion play-offs. They were eliminated in the quarter-finals against Carrarese after 2–2 draw being eliminated due to the opponent's higher classification in the regular season.

The regular season was suspended and then cancelled due to the COVID-19 pandemic in Italy.

== Serie C ==
Results list Juventus U23's goal tally first.

| Date | Opponent | Venue | Result | Scorers |
|---|---|---|---|---|
| 26 August 2019 | Novara | Away | 0–2 | |
| 1 September 2019 | Siena | Home | 2–3 | Mota (2) 51', 90'+1' |
| 15 September 2019 | Arezzo | Away | 2–1 | Mota 8' Clemenza 45'+2' (p) |
| 18 September 2019 | Pro Patria | Home | 2–2 | Olivieri 45'+1', Alcibiade 85' |
| 22 September 2019 | Pontedera | Home | 1–1 | Mota 81' |
| 25 September 2019 | AlbinoLeffe | Away | 1–1 | Mota 54' |
| 30 September 2019 | Monza | Home | 1–4 | Mota 55' |
| 6 October 2019 | Pianese | Away | 1–0 | Lanini 55' (p) |
| 20 October 2019 | Renate | Home | 2–1 | Olivieri 50', Lanini 86' |
| 23 October 2019 | Lecco | Away | 1–1 | Olivieri 54' |
| 27 October 2019 | Pergolettese | Home | 1–0 | Lanini 62' |
| 30 October 2019 | Pro Vercelli | Away | 1–0 | Beltrame 28' |
| 3 November 2019 | Giana Erminio | Away | 1–1 | Mota 78' (p) |
| 10 November 2019 | Pistoiese | Away | 0–2 | |
| 30 November 2019 | Como | Away | 1–1 | Mulè 88' |
| 4 December 2019 | Alessandria | Away | 1–1 | Zanimacchia 62' |
| 8 December 2019 | Carrarese | Away | 1–3 | Zanimacchia 62' |
| 11 December 2019 | Gozzano | Home | 0–1 | |
| 15 December 2019 | Olbia | Away | 1–1 | Clemenza 27' |
| 13 January 2020 | Siena | Home | 1–1 | Touré 86' |
| 19 January 2020 | Arezzo | Home | 1–0 | Zanimacchia 59' |
| 22 January 2020 | Novara | Home | 2–2 | Olivieri 79', Del Sole 90' |
| 25 January 2020 | Pro Patria | Away | 2–3 | Muratore 21', Marchi 58' |
| 2 February 2020 | Pontedera | Away | 0–0 | |
| 9 February 2020 | AlbinoLeffe | Home | 1–1 | Del Sole 75' |
| 16 February 2020 | Monza | Away | 2–1 | Marchi (2) 74' (p), 77' (p) |
| 23 February 2020 | Pianese | Home | 1–0 | Brunori 14' |

== Serie C play-offs ==
| Date | Round | Opponent | Venue | Result | Scorers |
|---|---|---|---|---|---|
| 9 July 2020 | Round of 16 | Padova | Home | 2–0 | Zanimacchia 53', Frabotta 67' |
| 13 July 2020 | Quarter-final | Carrarese | Away | 2–2 | Vrioni 75', Marqués 90' |

== Coppa Italia Serie C ==
| Date | Round | Opponent | Venue | Result | Scorers |
|---|---|---|---|---|---|
| 4 August 2019 | Matchday 1 | Pergolettese | Home | 2–0 | Beruatto 17', Touré 21' |
| 18 August 2019 | Matchday 3 | Reggio Audace | Home | 3–3 | Lanini (3) 27', 37', 69' |
| 6 November 2019 | Round of 32 | Alessandria | Home | 1–0 | Han 38' (p) |
| 27 November 2019 | Round of 16 | Pro Vercelli | Home | 2–0 | Frederiksen 75', Clemenza 90'+3' |
| 18 December 2019 | Quarter-final | Piacenza | Away | 2–1 | Rafia 38', Mota 48' (p) |
| 29 January 2020 | Semi-final | Feralpisalò | Away | 0–2 | |
| 12 February 2020 | Semi-final | Feralpisalò | Home | 4–0 (a.e.t.) | Marchi 14', Zanimacchia (2) 59', 115' (p), Rafia 120' |
| 27 June 2020 | Final | Ternana | Neutral | 2–1 | Brunori 12' (p), Rafia 45' |
