= Abdoulaye Dabo =

French footballer (born 2001)

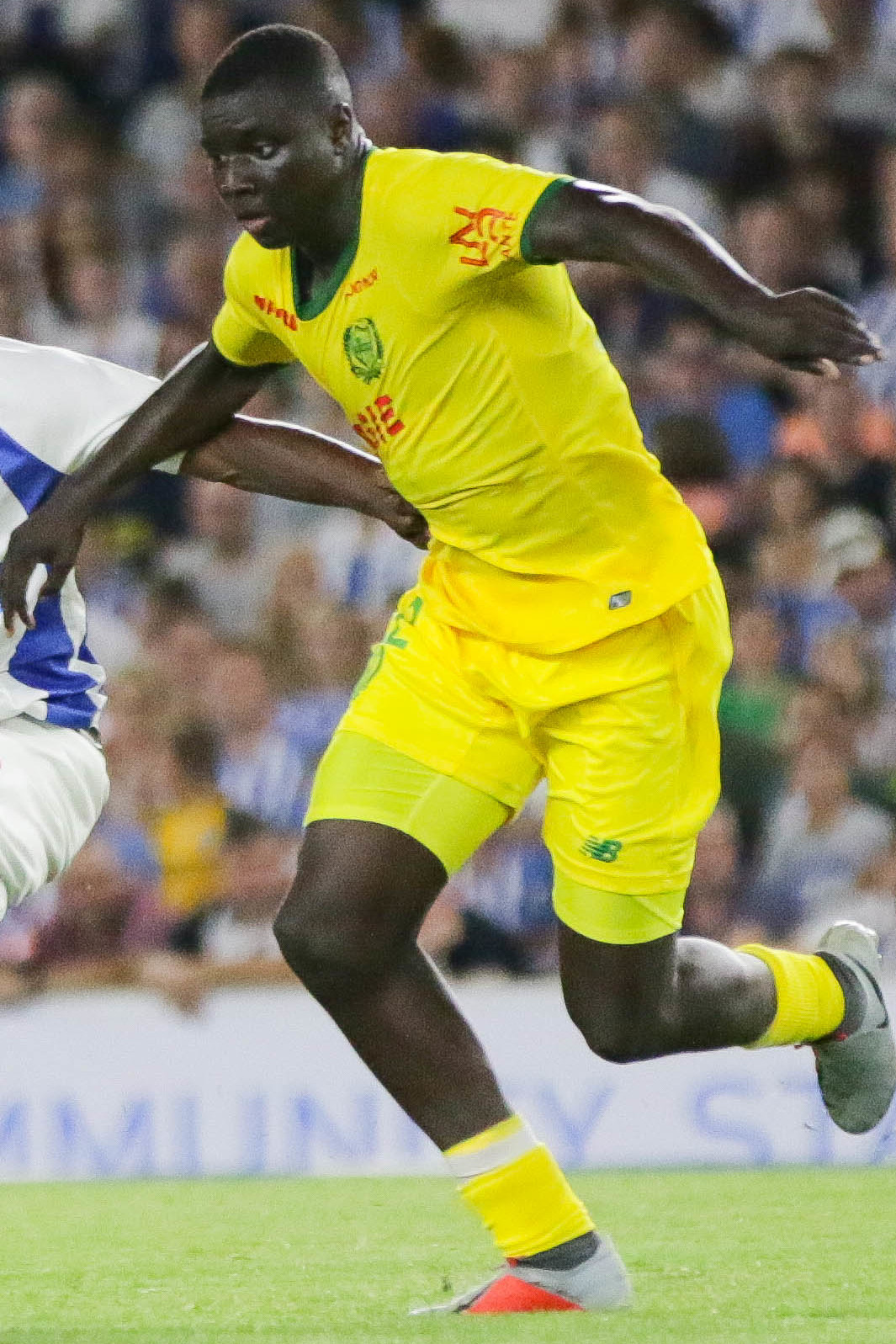
- Dabo with Nantes in 2018

Personal information
- Full name: Abdoulaye Dabo
- Date of birth: 4 March 2001 (age 25)
- Place of birth: Nantes, France
- Height: 1.81 m (5 ft 11 in)
- Positions: Attacking midfielder; winger

Team information
- Current team: Koper
- Number: 42

Youth career
- 2008–2014: JSC Bellevue Nantes
- 2014–2018: Nantes

Senior career*
Years	Team	Apps	(Gls)
2018–2021	Nantes	2	(0)
2018–2021	→ Nantes II	39	(6)
2021	→ Juventus U23 (loan)	18	(0)
2022–2023	Olympiacos	0	(0)
2022	Olympiacos B	14	(0)
2023	→ Levadiakos (loan)	9	(0)
2023–2025	Adanaspor	47	(3)
2026–	Koper	0	(0)

International career
2016–2017	France U16	13	(4)
2017–2018	France U17	10	(1)
2018	France U18	2	(0)
- * Club domestic league appearances and goals as of 8 February 2025

Abdoulaye Dabo (born 4 March 2001) is a French professional footballer who plays as a midfielder.

== Club career ==
=== Nantes ===
Coming through the youth system, Dabo signed his first professional contract with Nantes on 4 October 2017, at the age of 16. He became the youngest player in the club's history to sign a professional contract. Dabo made his professional debut for Nantes in a Ligue 1 match again Monaco on 11 August 2018.

After two Ligue 1 games, Dabo played for the reserve team in the National 2, the fourth tier of French football. His first 2018–19 game was on 15 September 2018, in a 1–0 home defeat to Le Havre II. Dabo's first goal came one week later, on 22 September, in a 2–1 away defeat to Saint-Malo. He played six games throughout the season, scoring twice. In the 2019–20 season, Dabo played 14 games, scoring three, whereas in the first half of the 2020–21 season, he played five games.

==== Loan to Juventus U23 ====
On 13 January 2021, Dabo joined Serie C side Juventus U23 – the reserve team of Juventus – on a six-month loan with a purchase option. On 17 January, he made his debut for Juventus U23 in a 1–1 draw against Piacenza.

=== Olympiacos ===
On 31 January 2022, Dabo signed for Super League Greece club Olympiacos on a contract until 2026.

=== Loan to Levadiakos ===
On 5 January 2023, Dabo was loaned to Levadiakos until the end of the season.

== International career ==
Born in France, Dabo holds French and Guinean nationalities. He is a youth international for France, having represented them at under-16, under-17, and under-18 levels.

== Style of play ==
Dabo began as a central midfielder in front of the defence. He is a left-footed quick and dynamic player, who is also known for his dribbling. During his last two years at Nantes II, Dabo moved to a more offensive position, often playing as a left midfielder.

== Career statistics ==
As of match played 30 May 2022

Appearances and goals by club, season and competition
Club	Season	League			National Cup (Note: Includes Coupe de France and Coppa Italia)		League Cup (Note: Includes Coupe de la Ligue)		Other		Total	
Club	Season	Division	Apps	Goals	Apps	Goals	Apps	Goals	Apps	Goals	Apps	Goals
Nantes	2018–19	Ligue 1	2	0	0	0	0	0	—		2	0
Nantes II	2018–19	National 2	6	2	—		—		—		6	2
Nantes II	2019–20	National 2	14	3	—		—		—		14	3
Nantes II	2020–21	National 2	5	0	—		—		—		5	0
Nantes II	2021–22	National 2	14	1	—		—		—		14	1
Nantes II	Total		39	6	—		—		—		39	6
Juventus U23 (loan)	2020–21	Serie C	16	0	—		—		2 (Note: Appearances in Serie C play-offs)	0	18	0
Olympiacos B	2021-22	Superleague 2	14	0	-		-		-		14	0
Career total			68	6	0	0	0	0	2	0	70	5
