= Giacomo Vrioni =

Albanian footballer (born 1998)

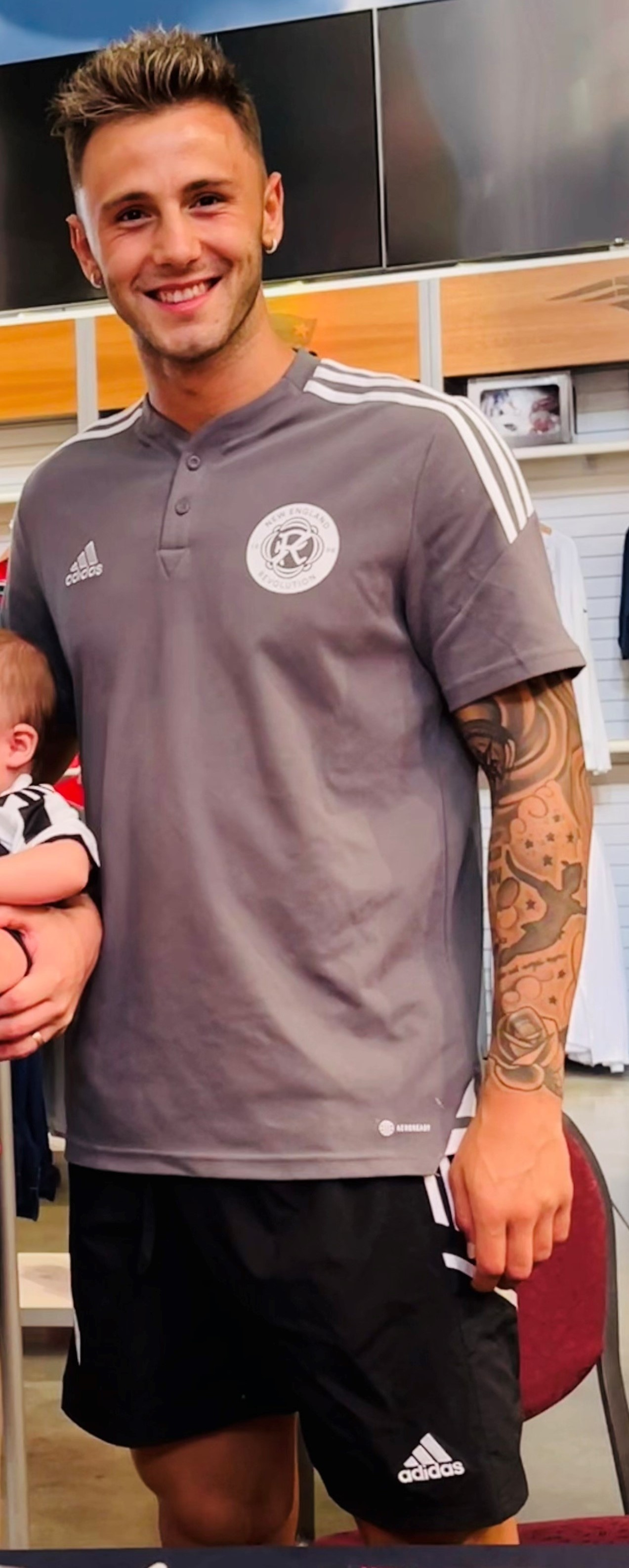
- Vrioni with the New England Revolution in 2022

Personal information
- Date of birth: 15 October 1998 (age 28)
- Place of birth: San Severino Marche, Italy
- Height: 1.88 m (6 ft 2 in)
- Position: Forward

Team information
- Current team: Wolfsberger AC
- Number: 9

Youth career
- 2015–2017: Sampdoria

Senior career*
| Years | Team | Apps | (Gls) |
| 2014–2015 | Matelica | 4 | (0) |
| 2017–2020 | Sampdoria | 0 | (0) |
| 2017–2018 | → Pistoiese (loan) | 27 | (8) |
| 2018–2019 | → Venezia (loan) | 24 | (1) |
| 2019–2020 | → Cittadella (loan) | 4 | (0) |
| 2020–2022 | Juventus | 2 | (0) |
| 2020–2021 | → Juventus U23 | 8 | (2) |
| 2021–2022 | → WSG Tirol (loan) | 28 | (19) |
| 2022–2024 | New England Revolution | 67 | (16) |
| 2025 | CF Montréal | 9 | (3) |
| 2026 | Cesena | 15 | (0) |
| 2026– | Wolfsberger AC | 3 | (4) |

International career
| 2016 | Italy U18 | 2 | (0) |
| 2016 | Italy U19 | 4 | (1) |
| 2018–2020 | Albania U21 | 8 | (2) |
| 2018–2022 | Albania | 6 | (0) |
- * Club domestic league appearances and goals as of 11:30, 23 August 2026 (UTC)

Giacomo Vrioni (Albanian: Xhakomo Vrioni; born 15 October 1998) is a professional footballer who plays as a forward for Austrian Bundesliga club Wolfsberg. Born in Italy, he has represented the Albania national team.

== Club career ==
=== Sampdoria ===
Born in San Severino Marche, Macerata, before Vrioni joined Sampdoria, he played in Serie D side Matelica where he made four appearances. In January 2015, Vrioni joined the Sampdoria youth system at the age of sixteen where he played a total of 58 matches, scoring 20 goals and making 6 assists. In the 2016–17 season he was also an unused substitute two times: once in Serie A against Palermo and once in Coppa Italia against Cagliari.

==== Loan to Pistoiese ====
On 20 July 2017, Vrioni was signed by Serie C club Pistoiese on a season-long loan deal. On 17 September he made his Serie C debut for Pistoiese as a substitute replacing Devis Nossa in the 67th minute and in the 74th minute he scored his first professional goal in a 1–1 away draw against Pro Piacenza. On 4 October, Vrioni played his first match for the club as a starter, a 0–0 away draw against Olbia, and was replaced by Claudio Zappa in the 69th minute. On 23 October he scored his second goal in the 8th minute of a 2–2 away draw against Pontedera. On 17 December he played his first entire match for Pistoiese and recorded his first career hat-trick in a 3–1 home win over Gavorrano. Vrioni ended his loan to Pistoiese with 27 appearances, 8 goals and 4 assists.

==== Loan to Venezia ====
On 9 July 2018, Vrioni was loaned to Serie B side Venezia on a season-long loan deal. On 5 August he made his debut in a 1–0 home defeat against Südtirol in the second round of Coppa Italia. On 26 August he made his Serie B debut in a 1–0 home win over Spezia, he was replaced by Alexandre Geijo after 76 minutes. Four months later, on 3 December, Vrioni scored his first goal in Serie B for the club in the 46th minute of a 1–1 away draw against Foggia. Vrioni ended his season-long loan to Venezia with 25 appearances, including 11 as a starter, 1 goal and 2 assists, but he played only 4 entire matches.

==== Loan to Cittadella ====
On 19 July 2019, Vrioni joined Serie B side Cittadella on loan until 30 June 2020. On 18 August, he made his debut for Cittadella as a substitute replacing Davide Diaw in the 84th minute of a match won at penalties in the third round of Coppa Italia against Carpi. Six days later, on 24 August, he made his league debut for the club as a substitute replacing Giuseppe Panico in the 81st minute of a 3–0 home defeat against Spezia. On 31 August he played his first match as a starter for Cittadella, a 4–1 away defeat against Benevento, and was replaced by Alberto Paleari after 46 minutes. In January 2020, Vrioni was re-called from Sampdoria leaving Cittadella with only 5 appearances.

=== Juventus ===
On 30 January 2020, Vrioni joined Juventus for an undisclosed fee; they moved him to their reserve team Juventus U23 in the Serie C. He made his professional debut, and Serie A debut, with the first team on 1 August 2020, in a 3–1 home defeat against Roma, coming on as a second–half substitute for Gonzalo Higuaín. On 27 November 2020, he injured his fibula, forcing him on the sidelines for five months. He helped the senior team win the 2019–20 Serie A, the club's ninth successive title. During the same season, he helped the under-23 team win the 2019–20 Coppa Italia Serie C. Vrioni returned from injury on 25 April 2021, playing in a home 1–0 win against Carrarese; he also scored the winning goal from the penalty spot.

==== Loan to WSG Tirol ====
On 5 July 2021, Vrioni was loaned to WSG Tirol in the Austrian Bundesliga. On 17 July, Vrioni made his debut for WSG Tirol in a 3–0 away win against Leobendorf in the first round of the Austrian Cup, scoring his first goal for the club.

=== New England Revolution ===
On 5 July 2022, Vrioni signed a three-year deal with Major League Soccer side New England Revolution. His transfer fee was reportedly close to $4 million. Vrioni made his league debut on 23 July 2022. Coming on as a 67th-minute substitute for Arnór Ingvi Traustason in a 0–0 draw against Columbus Crew. Vrioni admittedly had a difficult start to his inaugural Revolution campaign due to struggles with injury. He would miss a substantial portion of the 2022 season due to a knee injury, missing over a month of league play, ultimately making only 2 starts in 7 total appearances, tallying 248 minutes. On 1 October 2022, in the Revolution's final home game of the season, Vrioni made his first start as a member of the Revolution, and also scored his first goal for the club when he drew, and converted, a penalty past Atlanta United's goalkeeper Raúl Gudiño.

==== 2023 season ====
Vrioni scored his first goal of the 2023 New England Revolution season on 9 April 2023, the team's fourth goal in a 4–0 home win over CF Montréal. Two weeks later, on 23 April 2023, he scored a brace in the Revolution's 2–1 win over Sporting Kansas City. On 25 June 2023, he scored the team's game-winning goal in their 2–1 comeback victory over Toronto FC. He would again contribute a game-winning goal on 13 July, in the Revolution's 2–1 victory over Atlanta United FC. Vrioni scored his first Hat-trick for the Revolution on 26 July in a 5–1 victory over Atlético San Luis in the Leagues Cup. It was the first time the Revolution had scored a hat trick in an international competition. He dedicated the hat trick to the daughter of Brad Knighton, who had died earlier in the month.

==== 2024 season ====
Vrioni was named to the bench for the MLS week 22 Team of the Matchday after scoring a brace against FC Cincinnati. He was named to the week 24 Team of the Matchday for his brace in the Revolution's 2–1 home win against Atlanta United. Vrioni concluded the season as the Revolution's golden boot winner, finishing with nine goals during the regular season.

=== CF Montréal ===
On 7 January 2025, Vrioni was acquired by Montreal for $50,000 in 2025 General Allocation Money (GAM). He made his debut in a 1–0 loss to Charlotte FC on 12 April. Vrioni scored his first goal for the club on 30 April, a "spectacular" volley in the preliminary round of the 2025 Canadian Championship to equalize against Toronto F.C. in the 88th minute. He scored his first MLS league goal for the club on 3 May against the Philadelphia Union in a 2–1 loss. Vrioni was released by Montréal at the end of their 2025 season.

=== Cesena ===
On 5 February 2026, Vrioni signed with Serie B club Cesena until 30 June 2026, with an option to extend.

=== Wolfsberger AC ===
On 10 June 2026, Vrioni returned to Austria with a two-season contract for Wolfsberger AC. He previously was the second-best scorer of the 2021–22 Austrian Bundesliga season (Vrioni was tied for top spot with Karim Adeyemi if the goals he scored in the Europa Conference League play-offs are included).

== International career ==
=== Italy ===
Vrioni represented Italy at the Under-18 and Under-19 levels. On 9 March 2016 he made his debut at the U-18 level as a substitute replacing Simone Lo Faso in the 61st minute of a 1–1 home draw against Switzerland U-18. On 11 August 2016, Vrioni made his U-19 debut in a 1–0 home defeat against Croatia U-19, where he played the entire match. On 6 September 2016 he scored his first international goal, as a substitute, in the 94th minute of a 3–1 home win over Turkey U-19.

=== Albania ===
In September 2018 he switched his allegiance to his country of origin, Albania. He is from the Vrioni family of Albania in origin. After being called up to their Under-21 side for a friendly against his country of birth, Italy. He earned his first cap in this match, netting a last-minute equalizer in an eventual 3–1 defeat, as the Italian side scored two goals in injury time.

Vrioni made his senior debut for Albania on 14 October 2018, coming on as a second–half substitute in a 2–0 away defeat to Israel in the UEFA Nations League.

== Style of play ==
Vrioni plays as a forward. He is known for his strength.

== Personal life ==
Vrioni was born on 15 October 1998. He has a son.

== Career statistics ==
=== Club ===
As of match played 19 October 2024

Appearances and goals by club, season and competition
| Club | Season | League | | | National cup (Note: Includes Coppa Italia, Austrian Cup) | | Continental | | Other | | Total | |
| Club | Season | League | Apps | Goals | Apps | Goals | Apps | Goals | Apps | Goals | Apps | Goals |
|---|---|---|---|---|---|---|---|---|---|---|---|---|
| Pistoiese (loan) | 2017–18 | Serie C | 27 | 8 | — | | — | | 1 (Note: Appearance in Coppa Italia Serie C) | 0 | 28 | 8 |
| Venezia (loan) | 2018–19 | Serie B | 24 | 1 | 1 | 0 | — | | — | | 25 | 1 |
| Cittadella (loan) | 2019–20 | Serie B | 4 | 0 | 1 | 0 | — | | — | | 5 | 0 |
| Juventus U23 | 2019–20 | Serie C | 2 | 0 | — | | — | | 1 (Note: Appearance(s) Serie C promotion play-offs) | 1 | 3 | 1 |
| Juventus U23 | 2020–21 | Serie C | 6 | 2 | — | | — | | 2 | 0 | 8 | 2 |
| Juventus U23 | Total | | 8 | 2 | 2 | 0 | 0 | 0 | 3 | 1 | 11 | 3 |
| Juventus | 2019–20 | Serie A | 1 | 0 | 0 | 0 | 0 | 0 | 0 | 0 | 1 | 0 |
| Juventus | 2020–21 | Serie A | 1 | 0 | 0 | 0 | 0 | 0 | 0 | 0 | 1 | 0 |
| Juventus | Total | | 2 | 0 | 0 | 0 | 0 | 0 | 0 | 0 | 2 | 0 |
| WSG Tirol (loan) | 2021–22 | Austrian Bundesliga | 28 | 19 | 2 | 2 | — | | — | | 30 | 21 |
| New England Revolution | 2022 | MLS | 7 | 1 | — | | — | | — | | 7 | 1 |
| New England Revolution | 2023 | MLS | 19 | 5 | 1 | 0 | — | | 2 | 3 | 22 | 8 |
| New England Revolution | 2024 | MLS | 31 | 9 | — | | 5 | 3 | — | | 36 | 12 |
| New England Revolution | Total | | 57 | 15 | 1 | 0 | 5 | 3 | 2 | 3 | 65 | 21 |
| Career total | | | 150 | 45 | 5 | 2 | 5 | 3 | 6 | 4 | 166 | 54 |

=== International ===
As of match played 13 June 2022

Appearances and goals by national team and year
| National team | Year | Apps | Goals |
|---|---|---|---|
| Albania | 2018 | 1 | 0 |
| Albania | 2020 | 1 | 0 |
| Albania | 2022 | 4 | 0 |
| Total | | 6 | 0 |

== Honours ==
Juventus U23

- Coppa Italia Serie C: 2019–20

Juventus

- Serie A: 2019–20
