= Elia Petrelli =

Italian footballer (born 2001)

Personal information
- Date of birth: 15 August 2001 (age 25)
- Place of birth: Cesena, Italy
- Height: 1.88 m (6 ft 2 in)
- Position: Forward

Team information
- Current team: Forlì
- Number: 7

Youth career
- 2007–2010: Savignanese
- 2010–2011: Ravenna
- 2011–2016: Cesena
- 2016–2020: Juventus

Senior career*
Years	Team	Apps	(Gls)
2018–2021	Juventus U23	16	(5)
2021–2025	Genoa	0	(0)
2021	→ Reggina (loan)	1	(0)
2021–2022	→ Ascoli (loan)	0	(0)
2022	→ Carrarese (loan)	12	(1)
2022–2023	→ Triestina (loan)	12	(1)
2023	→ Siena (loan)	7	(0)
2023–2024	→ Pro Sesto (loan)	13	(1)
2024	→ Fermana (loan)	10	(0)
2024–2025	→ Forlì (loan)	28	(14)
2025–	Forlì	27	(6)

International career^{‡}
2016	Italy U16	1	(0)
2018	Italy U18	3	(1)
2018–2019	Italy U19	17	(2)
- * Club domestic league appearances and goals as of 30 April 2026 ‡ National team caps and goals as of 19 November 2019

Elia Petrelli (born 15 August 2001) is an Italian professional footballer who plays as a forward for Serie C Group B club Forlì.

== Club career ==
Petrelli joined the Juventus youth teams in the summer of 2016. He made his Serie C debut for Juventus U23 on 23 December 2018, in a game against Virtus Entella as a 72nd-minute substitute for Stephy Mavididi. On 22 November 2020, Petrelli scored a hat-trick during the 2020–21 season against Pistoiese, helping Juventus U23 win 3–2.

On 29 January 2021, Petrelli moved to Genoa for a fee of €8 million, plus a maximum of €5.3 million in performance-related bonuses. He was subsequently loaned to Reggina until the end of the 2020–21 season.

On 16 August 2021, Petrelli was loaned to Ascoli. He did not make any appearances for Ascoli in the first half of the season, and on 22 January 2022 he moved on a new loan to Serie C club Carrarese.

On 26 July 2022, Petrelli moved on loan to Serie C club Triestina. On 20 January 2023, he joined Siena on loan.

On 12 January 2024, Petrelli was loaned to Fermana.

In the 2024–25 season, he contributed to the promotion of Forlì, where he was on loan, to Serie C. On 10 July 2025, he returned to Forlì on a permanent basis.

== International career ==
Petrelli was first called up to represent his country for the under-16 squad in a friendly against Turkey in December 2016. He was called up to the under-17 team for the Euro qualifiers in October 2017, but remained on the bench in all three games.

In August 2018, Petrelli played in friendlies for Italy U18 and scored a goal against Serbia. In October 2018, he participated in the Euro qualifiers for the under-19 squad.
