= Raffaele Alcibiade =

Italian footballer (born 1990)

Personal information
- Date of birth: 23 May 1990 (age 36)
- Place of birth: Turin, Italy
- Height: 1.86 m (6 ft 1 in)
- Position: Centre-back

Team information
- Current team: Pro Patria
- Number: 13

Youth career
- Juventus

Senior career*
Years	Team	Apps	(Gls)
2009–2011	Juventus	0	(0)
2010–2011	→ Pescara (loan)	3	(1)
2011	→ Gubbio (loan)	8	(0)
2011–2012	Nocerina	9	(0)
2012–2013	Juventus	0	(0)
2012	→ Carrarese (loan)	12	(0)
2013	→ Honvéd (loan)	7	(0)
2013–2015	Honvéd	45	(2)
2015–2016	Haladás	11	(0)
2016	Lecce	13	(1)
2016–2017	Paganese	34	(3)
2017–2018	FeralpiSalò	13	(0)
2018	Pro Vercelli	2	(0)
2018–2019	Juventus U23	18	(0)
2019–2021	Juventus U23	40	(1)
2021–2022	Fidelis Andria	26	(0)
2022–2023	Sangiuliano	28	(2)
2023–2024	Renate	25	(0)
2024–	Pro Patria	15	(1)

International career
2009–2010	Italy U20	6	(0)
2011	Italy U21 Serie B	2	(0)
- * Club domestic league appearances and goals as of 13 December 2024

Raffaele Alcibiade (born 23 May 1990) is an Italian professional footballer who plays as a defender for Serie D club Pro Patria.

== Club career ==
=== Juventus ===
Alcibiade began his career with Italian and European powerhouse Juventus. He started out in youth ranks of the Torino-based squad and was eventually promoted to the Primavera squad in 2008. Upon his promotion to the Juventus first team, Alcibiade was sent out on loan to Serie B side Pescara. During his loan with the Serie B club, Alcibiade made just 3 league appearances in his 5-month spell, and the loan was subsequently terminated by Juventus in January 2011. After returning to Juventus, Alcibiade was again sent on loan, this time to Lega Pro Prima Divisione side Gubbio, where he played more frequently, making 9 first team appearances, 4 as a starter. 30 in June 2011, Alcibiade returned to Juventus. Soon after his return, Alcibiade was bought by newly promoted Serie B side A.S.G. Nocerina.

On 18 July 2011, he joined Nocerina in co-ownership deal, who were looking to bolster their squad following promotion from the Serie C1 to the second tier of Italian football, Serie B. Alcibiade made 9 Serie B appearances before returning to Juventus on 22 June 2012 in 2-year contract, following Nocerina's relegation back to the Lega Pro Prima Divisione. Alcibiade joined Carrarese Calcio on 30 August 2012, on a season long loan deal. After 13 league appearances for the Lega Pro side, the defender returned to Juventus once more in January 2013, in order to be re-loaned out to Hungarian Nemzeti Bajnokság I side, Budapest Honvéd. At Honvéd, Alcibiade teamed up with former Juventus youth teammate, Davide Lanzafame, who is on a similar loan deal from Serie A rivals, Calcio Catania

=== Hungary ===
On 30 June 2013, Alcibiade officially completed a permanent transfer from Juventus to the Hungarian side following the expiration of his loan deal.

On 20 January 2015, Alcibiade was signed by Hungarian League club Szombathelyi Haladás.

=== Return to Italy ===
On 17 February 2016 he returned to Italy for U.S. Lecce. In summer 2016 he was signed by Paganese Calcio 1926.

=== Juventus U23 ===
In August 2019, Alcibiade returned to Juventus to play for Juventus U23 on a contract for the rest of the season. Alcibiade's contract was not extended at the end of the season. However, he signed a new contract with the club in September 2019.

=== Fidelis Andria ===
On 21 September 2021, he joined Fidelis Andria.

== International career ==
Alcibiade has represented Italy at Italy U-20. He has six appearances for the U-20 team. He also played twice for Italy national under-21 B team, plus an unofficial match against Italy U20 in December 2011.

== Career statistics ==
=== Club ===
As of match played 14 May 2022

Club	Season	League			National Cup (Note: Includes Coppa Italia and Magyar Kupa)		League Cup (Note: Includes Ligakupa)		Continental		Other		Total	
Club	Season	Division	Apps	Goals	Apps	Goals	Apps	Goals	Apps	Goals	Apps	Goals	Apps	Goals
Pescara (loan)	2010–11	Serie B	3	1	0	0	—		—		—		3	1
Gubbio (loan)	2010–11	Lega Pro Prima Divisione	7	0	0	0	—		—		—		7	0
Nocerina	2011–12	Serie B	9	0	0	0	—		—		—		9	0
Carrarese (loan)	2012–13	Lega Pro Prima Divisione	12	0	0	0	—		—		—		12	0
Honvéd (loan)	2012–13	Nemzeti Bajnokság I	7	0	2	0	0	0	—		—		9	0
Honvéd	2013–14	Nemzeti Bajnokság I	25	1	2	0	3	0	4 (Note: Appearance(s) in the UEFA Europa League)	1	—		34	2
Honvéd	2014–15	Nemzeti Bajnokság I	13	1	1	0	2	0	—		—		16	1
Honvéd	Total		45	2	5	0	5	0	4	1	0	0	59	3
Haladás	2014–15	Nemzeti Bajnokság I	11	0	—		—		—		—		11	0
Lecce	2015–16	Lega Pro	13	1	0	0	—		—		—		13	1
Paganese	2016–17	Lega Pro	34	3	—		—		—		—		34	3
FeralpiSalò	2017–18	Serie C	13	0	1	0	—		—		—		14	0
Pro Vercelli	2017–18	Serie B	11	0	1	0	—		—		—		12	0
Juventus U23	2018–19	Serie C	18	0	—		—		—		—		18	0
Juventus U23	2019–20	Serie C	15	1	—		—		—		2 (Note: Include appearances in Serie C play-offs)	0	17	1
Juventus U23	2020–21	Serie C	25	2	—		—		—		2	0	27	2
Juventus U23	Total		58	3	0	0	0	0	0	0	4	0	62	3
Fidelis Andria	2021–22	Serie C	26	0	—		—		—		2 (Note: Include appearances in Serie C play-out)	0	28	0
Career total			164	10	7	0	5	0	4	1	6	0	233	11

== Honours ==
Juventus U23

- Coppa Italia Serie C: 2019–20

Gubbio

- Lega Pro Prima Divisione: 2010–11 (Group A)
