= Andrea Brighenti =

Italian footballer (born 1987)

Personal information
- Date of birth: 2 December 1987 (age 38)
- Place of birth: Brenzone, Italy
- Height: 1.78 m (5 ft 10 in)
- Position: Striker

Senior career*
Years	Team	Apps	(Gls)
2007–2008	Virtus Verona	30	(14)
2008–2009	Pavia	27	(2)
2009–2012	Sambonifacese	82	(25)
2012–2013	Renate	32	(20)
2013–2018	Cremonese	180	(69)
2019–2020	Monza	42	(8)
2020–2022	Juventus U23	54	(13)
2022–2023	Trento	15	(2)
2023–2024	Desenzano	14	(2)
2024	Clivense	16	(4)
2024–2025	ChievoVerona	34	(6)
2025–2026	Desenzano	22	(12)
- * Club domestic league appearances and goals

Andrea Brighenti (born 2 December 1987) is an Italian former professional footballer who played as a striker.

== Club career ==
=== Early career ===
Born in Brenzone, in the Province of Verona, Veneto, Brighenti started his career at fifth division for semi-pro club Virtus Verona. In 2008, he made his fully professional debut for Pavia in 2008–09 Lega Pro Seconda Divisione. In 2009, he was signed by fellow fourth division club Sambonifacese. He scored 13 goals in 2011–12 Lega Pro Seconda Divisione, which he was transferred to Renate at the end of season.

=== Cremonese ===
On 12 July 2013 he was signed by Parma for undisclosed fee (€77,000 including other costs) but immediately swapped with Alessandro Favalli of Cremonese. Both clubs retained 50% registration rights of the players. The 50% registration rights were valued for €250,000, thus no cash was involved in the deal. Brighenti scored 13 times in his maiden season of the third division. He also played all 3 matches of the promotion playoffs, with a goal.

=== Monza ===
On 4 January 2019, he signed with Monza.

=== Juventus U23 ===
On 2 September 2020, Brighenti joined Serie C club Juventus U23, the reserve club of Juventus, on a permanent deal. Brighenti's first goal for Juventus U23 came on 20 December, in a 2–1 loss against Pontedera, with a goal from the penalty spot.

=== Trento ===
On 26 August 2022, Brighenti signed a one-season contract with Trento.

== Honours ==
Monza

- Serie C Group A: 2019–20

== Career statistics ==
As of match played 16 April 2022

Club	Season	League			Coppa Italia		Other		Total	
Club	Season	Division	Apps	Goals	Apps	Goals	Apps	Goals	Apps	Goals
Virtus Verona	2007–08	Serie D	30	14	—				30+	14+
Pavia	2008–09	Lega Pro 2	27	2	—				27+	2+
Sambonifacese	2009–10	Lega Pro 2	17	4	—				17+	4+
Sambonifacese	2010–11	Lega Pro 2	31	8	—				31+	8+
Sambonifacese	2011–12	Lega Pro 2	34	13	—				34+	13+
Sambonifacese	Total		82	25	0	0	0+	0+	82+	25+
Renate	2012–13	Lega Pro 2	32	20	—		2+ (Note: Two appearances in promotion play-off, unknown number of matches in Coppa Itala Lega Pro)	1+	34+	21+
Cremonese	2013–14	Lega Pro 1	29	13	—		3+ (Note: Two appearances in promotion play-off, unknown number of matches in Coppa Itala Lega Pro)	1+	32+	14+
Cremonese	2014–15	Lega Pro	30	15	3	1			33+	16+
Cremonese	2015–16	Lega Pro	34	17	1	0			35+	17+
Cremonese	2016–17	Lega Pro	35	16	3	2	4+ (Note: Four appearances in promotion play-off, unknown number of matches in Coppa Itala Lega Pro)	1+	42+	19+
Cremonese	2017–18	Serie B	35	4	2	1	—		37	5
Cremonese	2018–19	Serie B	10	2	1	0	—		11	2
Cremonese	Total		180	69	10	4	9+	3+	199+	75+
Monza	2018–19	Serie C	14	3	0	0	4+ (Note: Four appearances in promotion play-off, unknown number of matches in Coppa Itala Lega Pro)	1+	18+	4+
Monza	2019–20	Serie C	24	4	3	2			27+	6+
Monza	Total		38	7	3	2	4+	1+	45+	10+
Juventus U23	2020–21	Serie C	28	7	—		2	1	30	8
Juventus U23	2021–22	Serie C	23	6	—			0	23+	6
Juventus U23	Total		52	13	0	0	2+	1	53+	14
Career total			409	130	13	6	16+	5+	438+	141
