= US Tolentino =

Italian football club

Tolentino
- Full name: Unione Sportiva Tolentino; S.r.l.
- Nickname: Cremisi (The All-Crimsons)
- Founded: 1919
- Ground: Stadio della Vittoria, Tolentino, Italy
- Capacity: 4,000
- Chairman: Giorgio Longhi
- Manager: Andrea Mosconi
- League: Eccellenza
- 2018–19: Eccellenza Marche (promoted)
Home colours	Away colours

Unione Sportiva Tolentino is an Italian association football club located in Tolentino, Marche. It currently plays in Eccellenza.

== History ==
The club was founded in 1919.

=== Serie C2 ===
Since the season 1996–97 Tolentino has played in Serie C2 and in Serie D.

== Colors and badge ==
Its colors are all-crimson.

== Honours ==
- Regional Coppa Italia Marche:
  - Winners 1: 2011–12
