= Cristiano Giuntoli =

Italian football executive and former footballer (born 1972)

Personal information
- Date of birth: 12 February 1972 (age 54)
- Place of birth: Florence, Italy
- Position: Defender

Senior career*
Years	Team	Apps	(Gls)
1990–1993	Prato	7	(0)
1993–1995	Colligiana	48	(2)
1995–1996	Latina	19	(1)
1996–2000	Imperia	111	(2)
2000–2001	Savona	21	(1)
2001–2005	Sanremese	78	(4)
2005–2008	Savona	69	(3)
2008–2009	Valle d'Aosta	8	(0)

Managerial career
- 2009–2015: Carpi (sporting director)
- 2015–2023: Napoli (sporting director)
- 2023–2025: Juventus (sporting director)
- 2026–: Atalanta (sporting director)
- * Club domestic league appearances and goals

Cristiano Giuntoli (born 12 February 1972) is an Italian football executive and former football player. Born in Florence, he grew up in his grandfather's bar and was planning to become an architect before he switched to a football playing career. Giuntoli played for the fourth and fifth divisions from 1990 until 2009, when he retired at the age of 37, having won a Serie D title. As sporting director, Giuntoli achieved one Serie A title, two Coppa Italia titles, and at least four promotions.

In 2007, Giuntoli took the licence to coach. In the summer of 2008, he began his sporting director career at Spezia. In the summer of 2009, Giuntoli moved to Carpi as deputy sporting director, before being promoted to sporting director in October 2009. During his tenure at Carpi, the squad he helped to build achieved four promotions in five seasons (from Serie D to Serie A), leading the club to Italian football's top division for the first time in its history.

In the summer of 2015, Giuntoli left Carpi to become sporting director of Napoli. Under his tenure, Napoli established itself at the top of Serie A in the following years, winning the 2019–20 Coppa Italia (the club's sixth title) and its third Scudetto by winning the 2022–23 Serie A, thirty-three years after the previous one. At the end of this last season, he ended his experience with the club after eight years. From the 2023–2024 season, he took over responsibility for Juventus' sporting affairs. In his first year, he won the 2023–24 Coppa Italia, the club's fifteenth title and its first trophy in three years; nevertheless, his overall performance was judged by the owners to be below expectations, and this led to the early termination of his contract at the end of a disappointing 2024–25 season.

== Early life and career ==
Giuntoli was born in Florence, Italy, on 12 February 1972, the son of entrepreneur and trader Tiziano and teacher Cosetta (née Pancani). Giuntoli hailed from the near Agliana, located in the province of Pistoia. Vivante, Giuntoli's grandfather from his mother side, owned a bar, and it is there that he grew up, as he explained in his Ted Talk entitled "Application Beyond Talent" that customers constantly talked about sports, especially football and cycling.

After attending the liceo scientifico, Giuntoli studied architecture under his mother's pressure and took nineteen exams with an average score of 29 out of 30, before he switched to playing football. Giuntoli played as a defender (more specifically as centre back) in Serie C2 and Serie D clubs, including Prato, Colligiana, Latina, Imperia, Savona, and Sanremese, scoring 13 goals in 330 appearances, before ending his career at Valle d'Aosta, where he reunited with his Imperia coach Giorgio Benedetti. Giuntoli won the 1998–99 Serie D with Imperia, where he was a key player. The Giuntoli–Roberto Biffi centre back pairing at Savona and Sanremese was among the most feared in Serie C2 and Serie D. During his time at Imperia in 1998, Giuntoli also had an exhibition match against eventual 1997–98 Serie A champions Juventus where he marked the returning-from-injury Filippo Inzaghi.

While in Prato, Giuntoli met Christian Vieri, who was there as part of the youth team before embarking a successful centre forward career. Vieri called Giuntoli "an old-style sweeper, all about fights and punches". In July 2009, Giuntoli officially retired from the football pitch at the age of 37 but had already began his executive career at Spezia in the summer of 2008, although there is not much information about his role, which may have included a sporting director or deputy head coach position, other that it lasted little before his move at Carpi. He was also reported to have been offered the position of deputy head coach for the 2005–06 season, where Spezia were promoted from Serie C1 to Serie B and beat Napoli to win the Supercoppa di Lega di Serie C1. His friend Antonio Soda, who had been at one time his head coach at Sanremese, said that he had asked Giuntoli for the position but that Giuntoli had refused.

According to his former Sanremese teammate Silvio Cassaro, even while still playing for Sanremese, Giuntoli acted as a deputy head coach and was already a scout of his own, and told Cassaro that he would be become a great sporting director. According to Soda, Giuntoli had told him to confirm Giancarlo Calabria, who proved to be a key player to the club's promotion to Serie C2, and as a result he is credited with this promotion, alongside one with Spezia and the multiple consecutive ones with Carpi. In 2007, Giuntoli went to Coverciano and took his head coach UEFA-B licence, before returning to Florence in order to finish his ISEF (Higher Institute of Physical Education) studies, and graduated in Physical Education.

== Sporting director ==
=== Carpi ===
In July 2009, Giuntoli joined Serie D club Carpi as deputy sporting director. In October 2009, he was promoted by the club owner Stefano Bonacini to the role of sporting director of Carpi. Giuntoli accepted on the condition that he could sell twelve to thirteen players. He also proposed Maurizio Sarri as head coach; however, Bonacini opted for Giancarlo D'Astoli instead. In this role, Giuntoli supported Bonacini's rebuilding initiative, placing a strong focus on the acquisition of young, emerging, and little-known players thanks to targeted scouting. Carpi had been founded in 1909 but were declared bankrupt in 1999 and re-established in 2000 starting from Serie D, the then Italian football's fifth division, and did not achieve promotions until 2009–10 and Giuntoli's tenure. Within six seasons starting from Serie D, Carpi achieved their first-ever promotions to Serie B and Serie A. Bonacini, who owned and administrated the club with clothing-industry firms Madrilena and Gaudi owners Claudio Caliumi and Roberto Marani and was himself co-owner of Gaudi with Marani, called their team the "Ryanair of Italian football" and a "low cost club who win". By 2014–15, the club had a reported turnover of €4.5 million, of which €3 million accounted for the players' salaries, which would not be enough to pay half the salary of Daniele De Rossi, a midfielder from Roma who was reported to be highest paid Italian player at €6.5 million. Giuntoli himself observed that no one at the club earned more than €100,000 a year. In 2020, Bonacini recalled how in the winter transfers of the 2014–15 Serie B season Giuntoli bought Marco Modolo (a centre back from Gorica) and Nicola Pasini (a centre back and right back from Pistoiese) for €27,000, and helped Carpi in their first-ever promotion to Serie A.

Under Giuntoli, the club achieved two immediate promotions (to Serie C2 and Serie C1) in the 2009–10 (despite finishing second and losing the playoff semi-finals) and 2010–11 seasons (Carpi finished first, while losing both finals of the Coppa Italia Lega Pro and Supercoppa di Lega di Seconda Divisione). After a third place and playoff loss to Pro Vercelli in 2011–12, which saw Carpi reaching the second round of Coppa Italia, the club was promoted to Serie B in 2012–13. In 2013–14, Carpi achieved a thirteen place, and safely avoided relegation in their first Serie B season while again reaching the second round of Coppa Italia, a feat that was further repeated in 2014–15, when they were promoted to Serie A. In their Serie B-winning season, Carpi had a record of 22 wins, 14 draws, and 6 losses, leading the league for the whole season, and the squad gained the Serie A promotion with four matchdays to spare. For the Serie B season, the club had put a limited budget of €3 million for the salaries of the players and €750,000 for the technical staff. The squad that Giuntoli helped to build had an average age of 24. There were questions about Carpi's stadium, the Stadio Sandro Cabassi, due to being significantly inferior to 20,00 capacity, with the same reported capacity of 4,144 when playing in Serie D. In February 2015, the Lazio president Claudio Lotito attracted criticism over a leaked telephone conversation in which he said that Carpi's Serie A promotion would be a financial disaster for Italian football's top division, stating: "If Carpi come up ... if teams come up who are not worth lira, in two or three years we won't have a penny."

According to Il Mostardino journalist Enrico Bonzanini, who frequented Giuntoli during his five-year stay in Carpi, the club boasted at the beginning of Giuntoli's tenure of Carpi in Serie D a net worth of just a few thousands more than €10,000, despite owning only a handful of players. By 2015, Carpi had 18 players under contract and an estimated net worth of €15 million. Key players discovered by Giuntoli included Kevin Lasagna, a striker picked up by Giuntoli from Este, an amateur team in the province of Padua. The head coach Fabrizio Castori, who was also brought to Carpi by Giuntoli, said that what convinced Giuntoli were videos of Lasagna "going so fast he was out of frame". Giuntoli also discovered Roberto Inglese (a striker from Lumezzane), Gaetano Letizia (a right back from Real Normanna), and Riccardo Gagliolo (a left back from Imperia), all of whom went on to have decent careers in Serie A and Serie B. Among the many successful signings at Carpi, the one said to have turned his career around by landing him at Napoli was Jerry Mbakogu. A striker and winger, Mbakogu was picked up on loan from Padova despite still suffering from and injury, and he was then kept at Carpi after the Padova's bankruptcy. Mbakogu was Carpi's prized possession thanks to a 15-goal season in Serie B, which attracted clubs including Napoli. While Mbakogu ultimately stayed at Carpi, Giuntoli moved to Napoli. After Giuntoli left Carpi for Napoli, the club was relegated to Serie B. According to Castori, if Giuntoli had stayed at Carpi, the club may have stayed in Serie A.

=== Napoli ===
In summer of 2015, Napoli owner Aurelio De Laurentiis convinced Giuntoli to join his team that had begun to challenge for the Serie A title despite an unsuccessful spell with Rafael Benítez. He was reported to have signed a four-year contract with an annual salary of €600,000, which was significantly less than his counterparts at Roma, Milan, and Inter Milan. In his first transfer window, Giuntoli signed such players as Allan (a defensive midfielder from Udinese), Elseid Hysaj (a full back from Empoli), Pepe Reina (a goalkeeper from Liverpool), and Mirko Valdifiori (a central midfielder from Empoli), although Hysaj and Valdifiori were considered to have been Sarri's signings due to both have been at Empoli when Sarri was their head coach. Giuntoli called the signing of Allan, in exchange of €12 million plus centre back Miguel Britos and the two-year loan of forward Duván Zapata, "the most grueling negotiation of my career". With Sarri as their new head coach, Napoli were at the top of the league table halfway through the 2015–16 Serie A season. The club finished in second place behind their rivals Juventus amid their record-breaking nine consecutive league titles; Juventus had also signed Napoli striker Gonzalo Higuaín for €90 million in the 2016 summer transfer window.

During Giuntoli's tenure, Napoli proved to be Juventus' closer competitor, with three second-place finishes in 2015–16 (9 points behind Juventus, 91 to 82), 2017–18 (their closest challenge, with 4 points behind Juventus, 95 to 91), and 2018–19 (11 points behind Juventus, 90 to 79) and one third-place finish in 2016–17 (5 points behind Juventus and 1 point behind Roma, 91 to 86). In 2017–18, Napoli became the club with the most points (91) without winning the Scudetto, averaging 2.39 points per game compared to the 2.36 points per game (adjusted to 3 points per win) by Torino in the 1976–77 Serie A. After Napoli's 3–1 loss to Juventus in the semi-final first leg of the 2017–18 Coppa Italia, which Juventus went on to win as part of their unprecedented four consecutive domestic doubles that Napoli under Giuntoli helped to break with their 2019–20 Coppa Italia win, Giuntoli called the penalty kick decisions against Napoli to be "shameful and damaging to all of Italian football", although others including Italian football correspondent Adam Digby and Gianluca Nesci of theScore disagreed. In June 2020, De Laurentiis stated that "Napoli is the only team that can challenge Juventus. We beat them in the [2011–12 and 2019–20] Coppa Italia and the [2014] Supercoppa, we haven't won the Scudetto yet, but sooner or later we will."

Giuntoli's most important acquisition in summer 2016 was Piotr Zieliński, a midfielder from Udinese who went on to deliver 51 goals and 47 assists in 364 appearances for the club, for €16 million. In February 2017, Il Mattino reported that Zieliński was worth €70 million, which was his release clause. In subsequent years, recruitment was funded by the proceeds from profitable sales, such as defensive midfielder Jorginho's €57 million move to Chelsea. Giuntoli brought in the likes of Khvicha Kvaratskhelia (a left winger from Dinamo Batumi), Kim Min-jae (a centre back from Fenerbahçe), and Victor Osimhen (a striker from Lille), playing a crucial role in building the squad that won the 2022–23 Serie A, in what was Napoli's first Scudetto in 33 years, the first without established players like Diego Armando Maradona and Careca. Other signings considered to have been good during his tenure at Napoli are those of Giovanni Di Lorenzo (a right back from Empoli), Stanislav Lobotka (a defensive midfielder from Celta Vigo), Matteo Politano (a right winger from Inter Milan), Fabián Ruiz (a central midfielder from Betis), and Mário Rui (a left back from Roma). The signing of Alex Meret (a goalkeeper from Udinese), after initial scepticism and some difficulties including almost being replaced by Keylor Navas in the 2022 summer window market, ultimately proved decisive to the Coppa Italia win in 2020 and the Scudetto in 2023.

De Laurentiis reportedly blamed Giuntoli for the sacking of Carlo Ancelotti in 2019, when the players led by then captain Lorenzo Insigne refused to return to the training camp (imposed by the club) after a defeat with Salzburg in the 2019–20 UEFA Champions League. Giuntoli reportedly did not have a good relationship with Ancelotti, who was sacked in December 2019 and replaced by Gennaro Gattuso. Gattuso was chosen by Giuntoli as the new head coach to rebuild the club. In what was his first trophy as head coach, Gattuso led the club to win on penalty shoot-out against Juventus in the 2020 Coppa Italia final. It was Giuntoli's first trophy as sporting director, Napoli's first trophy in six years, and the club's sixth Coppa Italia. As a result of this win, Napoli qualified for the 2020 Supercoppa Italiana against Juventus, and also for the 2020–21 UEFA Europa League group stage despite finishing seventh in the league, the first time it missed the UEFA Champions League since the 2014–15 Serie A, the last season before Giuntoli's move at Napoli; Giuntoli was not overtly happy about the Coppa Italia win, as it meant the club still missed the Champions League. After their 2–0 loss to Juventus in the 2020 Supercoppa Italiana, Il Mattino reported that Giuntoli shouted in the locker room to spur the squad.

The transfer of Osimhen, one of the few high-profile investments in the 2020 summer window market with Giuntoli beating Premier League competition, was considered risky as football clubs were grappling with declining revenues and therefore finding it difficult to much such an investment amid the COVID-19 recession. Other transfers to rebuild the club included Diego Demme (a defensive midfielder from Leipzig) and Amir Rrahmani (a centre back from Hellas Verona). The transfer of Lobotka was considered indicative of Giuntoli's trajectory at Napoli. For nearly two years, he had been strongly criticised for this transfer, with €25 million considered to have been lost for what was considered an overweight midfielder on the fringes of the team. Under new head coach Luciano Spalletti, who led the club to the Scudetto, Lobotka became one of the best midfielders in Serie A alongside Frank Anguissa (a central midfielder from Fulham), who had been signed in the final days of the 2021 summer transfer window on a low loan (€500,000) with a buyout option set and subsequently exercised at €15 million. Juan Jesus, a centre back from Roma, was also signed by Giuntoli thanks to Spalletti, who had coached him at Roma.

His last summer transfer window in 2022 was particularly praised, even called "Giuntoli's Gioconda", and raised his profile as he attracted the notice of the biggest football clubs, including Juventus. In 60 days, he turned Napoli inside out by lowering the costs and increasing the squad's value. After letting go of Insigne, Dries Mertens, and David Ospina at the end of onerous contracts and selling Koulibaly and Ruiz for a total of over €60 million, Giuntoli brought Kim and Kvaratskhelia to Napoli for around €30 million, in addition to a significant investment in Giacomo Raspadori (a forward from Sassuolo), Mathías Olivera (a left back from Getafe), and Giovanni Simeone (a striker from Hellas Verona). At the celebrations for the Scudetto, amid rumours linking him to Juventus, Giuntoli said: "I wish to thank De Laurentiis and Andrea Chiavelli, who hired me from Carpi and changed my life. The president treated me like a son. I just want to say to the fans that they shouldn't worry about the future. I've been here for eight years, and there's always chatter about who will leave and who will stay. As long as Napoli is in De Laurentiis' hands, there will never be an issue, and the team will always be great."

Giuntoli left Napoli after winning one Coppa Italia in 2020 and one Scudetto in 2023, for which he was given The Greatest Challenge of the Year award at the 2023 Golden Boy ceremony, also achieving Napoli's best result in the UEFA Champions League by reaching the quarter-finals of the 2022–23 UEFA Champions League. Other Serie A results achieved by Napoli under Giuntoli included a seventh and fifth place in 2019–20 and 2020–21 before rebounding to third place in 2021–22. In Coppa Italia, the club had one semi-finals (2016–17) and multiple round of 16 (2020–21, 2021–22, and 2022–23) and quarter-finals results (2015–16, 2017–18, and 2018–19). In UEFA competitions, Napoli did not go beyond quarter-finals in the 2018–19 UEFA Europa League, with exits at round of 32 (2015–16, 2017–18, 2020–21, and 2021–22), while other Champions League results included two round of 16 exits (2016–17 and 2019–20) and two group stage exits as the third-placed club (2017–18 and 2018–19). He overtook his predecessor Riccardo Bigon to become the longest tenured sporting director in Napoli's history.

=== Juventus ===
Soon after Napoli secured the league title, they confirmed that Giuntoli would leave the club. On 7 July 2023, he signed a five-year contract with Juventus after a lengthy negotiation with De Laurentiis as his contract still had one year left with Napoli. As a result, he reportedly gave up €3 million. Due to the lengthy negotiation, he was not able to travel to Rimini and receive an award for his work as sporting director. Giuntoli had been a supporter of Juventus since he was a child thanks to his family's support for the club, and in particular that of his father Tiziano, who reportedly asked to be buried with a Juventus shirt. In his first words as the new Football Director of Juventus, Giuntoli said: "For a kid like me, who traveled from Prato and traveled eight hours by bus to see Juventus, it's a source of great satisfaction. An incredible feeling." About his father, Giuntoli recalled: "He was a fanatical fan; when I was eight, he took me to matches, to swing an umbrella. I thought of him when I arrived here, and I think about it and it moves me. Juve is a point of arrival, the pinnacle." As sporting director of Juventus, he continued to celebrate 5 May, the day Juventus won the 2001–02 Serie A by leapfrogging rivals Inter Milan at the last matchday. Before a match against Roma in 2024, he said: "First and foremost today 5 May, we are in Rome, that is always a pleasure to mark this date."

When Giuntoli arrived at Juventus, the club had lost its competitive edge in the past three seasons, with no trophies in the last two seasons, and was signed as part of a significant rebuilding effort, which required being "competitive and financially sustainable". The club was also controversially penalised by the FIGC due to the Plusvalenza scandal and as a result was later banned by UEFA from the UEFA club competitions in the 2023–24 season, and was in financial trouble, which meant the transfer window was restricted, and the only summer addition to the senior squad was Timothy Weah, while many players were sold or released, including Leonardo Bonucci, who was the then club's captain. In the past, Juventus often found themselves dealing with high-earning benchwarmers such as Amauri, Aaron Ramsey, and Sami Khedira (in his final years) who were loaned or put out of the squad as they refused to be sold. As part of Giuntoli's first summer transfer window, the club saved at least €70 million. Giuntoli also took more power and responsibilities, as at least two to three professional figures were involved in roles for which by now he was the sole responsabile, and his trusted collaborators followed him at Juventus a year later.

Juventus looked to be in the fight for the Scudetto, which they have not won since their unprecedented streak of nine consecutive titles in 2011–20, as after some early difficulties, they fought for first place starting in October 2023. This lasted until February 2024, when they lost 1–0 to their rivals and eventual champions Inter Milan; the win came with an own goal by Federico Gatti and gave Inter Milan a 4-point advantage, with a matchday to spare, and Juventus were not able to close the gap, only fighting for second place and finishing third. It is after the winter transfer window that Giuntoli and Allegri reportedly had a fallout over Giuntoli's transfer failures like Tiago Djaló and Carlos Alcaraz. Also in February 2024, he reportedly worked to bring Thiago Motta as new head coach regardless of Allegri's results, with the rumours reaching the locker room. The club won the 2024 Coppa Italia final against Atalanta and qualified for the 2024–25 Supercoppa Italiana. It marked the first trophy under Giuntoli and the club's first in three years; however, Allegri was sacked due to his behavior after the match. Prior to the Coppa Italia win, Juventus had won only two of their last thirteen Serie A matches.

In summer 2024, as part of a youthful and revolutionary project for the club's rebuilding effort, Juventus appointed Motta as a new head coach with expectations to modernise the squad's style of play, and also to prioritise youthful talent, aged 18 to 26, among them Vasilije Adžić, who was initially expected to join Juventus Next Gen, the club's reserve team in Serie C, before being promoted to the first team. As part of this effort, former starters like Wojciech Szczęsny (who was replaced by Michele Di Gregorio) and then captain Danilo Luiz da Silva (who was replaced by Renato Vega and Lloyd Kelly) were released. With €320 million of losses in the previous two seasons and a number of bad contracts, the club signed nine first-team players, outspending their competitors with transfer budget of around €200 million, and raising around €100 million through the sales of players, including Matías Soulé and Federico Chiesa.

Juventus were expected to challenge the reigning champions Inter Milan for the Scudetto, and the club began well and looked promising with two 3–0 wins against Como and Hellas Verona. Juventus were also able to stand with and beat the likes of 2022–23 champions Manchester City and Leipzig in the 2024–25 UEFA Champions League, while forcing a 4–4 draw against Inter Milan in Serie A; however, the squad ultimately proved to be inconsistent, with difficulties in scoring goals and wins. As in 2023–24, Juventus were not far away from first place until March 2025, when two consecutive losses dropped the club to fifth place and prompted an uproar from club supporters including Massimo Giletti and Flavio Briatore asking the management to do something about it, and were briefly considered still a Scudetto contender alongside Napoli, Inter Milan, and Atalanta, having the lowest goals conceded. By December 2024, Juventus were sixth when the year prior they had fought for the lead. On 16 February, Juventus beat Inter Milan 1–0 and moved up to fourth, and before their two consecutive losses were only 6 points away from first place.

Giuntoli managed to reduce the wage bill and rejuvenate the squad; however, his decisions were criticised for the squad's ultimately underwhelming performance in the 2024–25 season, where he was in a technical director role officially known as Managing Director of Football. Giuntoli's choice of Motta was criticised due to the squad's performance, and was compared to Luca Cordero di Montezemolo's choice of Luigi Maifredi, another head coach who was signed by Juventus after a successful season at Bologna, with critics calling it the worst season since 1990–91. The club's most expensive signings, such as Douglas Luiz (Brazil's gold medalist at the 2020 Summer Olympics), Teun Koopmeiners (winner of the 2023–24 UEFA Europa League), and Nicolás González (two-time finalist in the UEFA Conference League), failed to live up to expectations; among the notable exceptions were the signings of Di Gregorio and Khéphren Thuram. Juventus parted ways with several established players, such as Moise Kean, who went on to become the season's second-best goalscorer after his €13 million transfer to Fiorentina.

Under Giuntoli, Juventus let go of a number of talented players, most notably Dean Huijsen, who was sold to Bournemouth for €15 million, with Real Madrid activating his €59 million release clause a year later. Dušan Vlahović, the highest-paid player in the league, was not suited for Motta's style of play, and effectively became a substitute player with the arrival of Randal Kolo Muani on loan from Paris Saint-Germain. In January 2025, Juventus did not reach the Supercoppa Italiana final after losing to eventual winners Milan, another top club that like Juventus had a disappointed season standing at mid-table before appointing a new head coach, and did not go beyond the 2024–25 UEFA Champions League knockout phase in February 2025, being knocked out 3–1 in extra time (4–3 on aggregate score) by the same PSV Eindhoven that Juventus had handily beaten in the league phase and in the first leg. Giuntoli said that the exit was a disappointment and that it was painful since while it was expected to be a difficult year due to the many changes to the squad, he still hoped to reach at least the round of 16 for image and economic reasons. The club's tifosi also did not enjoy the away shirt chosen by the management and described it as pale as the squad's performance.

With 18 wins from 42 league and cup games, including a quarter-finals exit from the 2024–25 Coppa Italia at the hands of Empoli and the club's heaviest losses since 1967 and 1955 by Atalanta and a struggling Fiorentina (4–0 and 3–0 respectively), and doubts over the club's ability to qualify for the 2025–26 UEFA Champions League, Juventus dismissed Motta in March 2025, a week after Giuntoli's assurances that the head coach was a part of a "long-term project". Juventus under Motta had a Serie A average of 1.79 points per game despite reportedly spending €150 million in transfers, with the 29 Serie A matches managed by Motta yielding 52 points, the club's worst points tally in 29 matches since the 2010–11 Serie A, and an overall average of 1.67 points per game, slightly below his tally at Bologna (1.68). Among head coaches with at least 40 matches for Juventus since the 1929–30 Serie A, only Luigi Delneri's 40 percent (20 out of 50 matches) and Sandro Puppo's 24 percent (15 from 62) had a worse result than Motta's 43 percent (13 from 29).

As a result of Motta's lack of success, with reports about a relationship break down between Motta and the players, Igor Tudor was appointed as interim head coach, with a renewal if Juventus were to reach the fourth place; Juventus were fifth by the time Tudor was appointed, and with an improved average of 2.0 points per game the club reached fourth place at the last matchday. At five seasons, excluding the post-Calciopoli years, it became the longest time the club had gone without winning a league title since 1987–1995 and the 1960s. The club felt vindicated with the head coach change, and Tudor led Juventus at the 2025 FIFA Club World Cup and was ultimately confirmed as head coach, while Giuntoli was not.

On 3 June 2025, Juventus announced that the contract with Giuntoli was terminated by mutual agreement. He was succeeded by Damien Comolli and Matteo Tognozzi. Although he led Juventus to UEFA Champions League qualification (the club's minimum objective) with third in 2024 and fourth in 2025, won one Coppa Italia in 2024, and helped to improve the club's finances by almost reaching a balanced budget, Giuntoli was blamed for Motta's failure and his disappointing transfers ultimately led to his departure. According to the Gazzetta dello Sport, this decision was taken by the club owner John Elkann, citing Giuntoli's choice of Motta, the numerous sales of young talents, and the lack of sporting results. Before leaving the club, Giuntoli reportedly phoned each of the twenty-seven Juventus players to bid them his farewell.

=== Atalanta ===
On 30 May 2026, Giuntoli was appointed as Atalanta's sporting director, signing a three-year contract.

== Profile ==
During his time at Carpi and Napoli, Giuntoli was able to develop highly competitive squads on relatively limited budget for eight years straight. Prior to his arrival at Napoli, he was compared to Giovanni Sartori, the then sporting director of Atalanta who was himself linked to Napoli before the club chose Giuntoli. Giuntoli himself had Italo Allodi as a model; Allodi had also been a mentor to Luciano Moggi, and with them as sporting directors Napoli won their first two ever league titles, and Giuntoli's friends had wished him to become the new Allodi and win with Napoli, which he did in 2023. In his work starting at Carpi, Giuntoli was described as obsessive, from checking the grass on the pitch to the players' food to the hotels for training camps, saying: "You can't save money there, the players have to be healthy and happy." Notably, he attracted criticism when he explained how he assessed the talent of a footballer before beginning negotiations to make a purchase. In response to a question from a journalist, he stated: "When you buy a player, it's like a girlfriend. You think she's the right one and you take her to dinner but then, along the way, you realise when you bring her home that she's not good – she doesn't cook, she doesn't do the washing, she doesn't iron."

Giuntoli developed a system that he calls "work and sacrifice", and observed the players on the pitch to study them and building relationships. As Carpi did not have extensive resources, he focused on research, saying: "I take kids for free from the amateurs, I have three collaborators and many friends who recommend them to me, then there's the computer for scouting, but the final decision remains mine." At Carpi, he was given full powers as sporting director, including the search for collaborators, scouting, intuition, and relationships. It was during his tenure, particularly when Carpi were promoted to Serie A thanks to his work, that both Giuntoli and Carpi attracted international attention, with talks of "Carpi miracle", "Carpi fairytale", and "Carpi of miracles", a club reaching the top division of football after starting with a few employees and a stadium of only 3,000 capacity, with Giuntoli providing a competitive team at a low cost. As a result of his and Carpi's successes, he was called "the wizard of transfers".

As Carpi's successes were brought to attention, Giuntoli was asked what was his secret. He stated: "I choose them big and heavy, or small and agile: they must have a striking physical quality; an orchestra needs trombones and violins. It takes courage with young players, but it's a calculated risk. We cut the budget by 40%, we just wanted to stay alive, we're at the top: we made many right bets and chose the right man on the bench." Among his collaborators was Roberto Canepa, a former colleague from his time at Carpi, who said about Giuntoli: "Cristiano has an innate gift. He is a leader. He did not study as a leader, it's not something they teach in Coverciano. You have it or you don't. The preparation is 360 degrees, which goes from the pitch to the desk, to negotiations, to the players' health part. He has superior training in many fields. One of his qualities is that he makes the most of the abilities of his collaborators and this happened in Carpi. A team of collaborators was built who then created a miracle."

Giuntoli's early time at Napoli was considered to be underrated or overlooked, and the credit for a consistently competitive team was given to Benitez and his two-year transfer window while for the performances and growth of the players it was given to Sarri, who at first had convinced Higuaín to stay and then switching from the 4–4–2 diamond formation to the 4–3–3 with Higuaín, Insigne, and Jorginho, alongside José Callejón, Faouzi Ghoulam, Marek Hamšík, and Pierre Koulibaly, as key players. Giuntoli's first transfer window in particular was overlooked, so much so that his assertive manner, unbecoming of a sports director of a major club, was talked about more than the transfer market itself. During a training camp, he came to blows with Jonathan de Guzmán, a brawl de Guzmán later recalled: "I was in the locker room and he said to me, 'Hey, you piece of shit, come here. You're leaving, you promised.' And I said, 'I didn't promise anything.' And suddenly he hit me in the face." Nonetheless, Giuntoli was ultimately considered a key to Napoli's Scudetto in 2023, being widely called "the architect of the Scudetto". He was able to do so by making profits from sales and lowered wages. Although he was considered to a certain extent lucky and shared the credit with other key figures, large public opinion explicitily gave the credit to him and put the sporting director role at the forefront, with talks of a Giuntoli model, involving five hours of watching videos daily, algorithms, and a network of relations across the world.

At Napoli, thanks to his successful signings, Giuntoli is credited for cementing the club's status as a top club with the 2023 Scudetto. He is also credited for his ability to navigate all aspects of his sporting director role, in particular for his sales. Even less successful signings, such as Leonardo Pavoletti, Nikola Maksimović, Kévin Malcuit, Marko Rog, and Simone Verdi, were offset by Giuntoli's ability of selling well. Allan was sold for €25 million despite being in a bad relationship with the club, while Inglese was sold to Parma for €18 million, and Verdi was sold to Torino, making him the club's most expensive acquisition. As De Laurentiis took most of Napoli's media space, Giuntoli spent hours watching matches alongside his most trusted collaborators Giuseppe Pompilio, Leonardo Mantovani, and Maurizio Micheli. He recalled watching a young Patrik Schick "in a match that looked like a match between bachelors and married men on a pitch in the outskirts of Slovakia's Serie B. ... I ran to wake up my right-hand man, Giuseppe Pompilio: it was three in the morning. I told him, 'Look, I saw a really strong player.'" He also spent much time talking to football agents, journalists, and other collaborators around the world. The players are often scrutinised and evaluated from a personal perspective, one example being Lille's right winger and forward Nicolas Pépé. Giuntoli watched him many times before turning down the purchase, which would have been the most expensive in Napoli's history. Giuntoli daily followed Oshimen's matches since his performance at the 2015 FIFA U-17 World Cup where he was the top scorer.

The transfers of Kim and Kvaratskhelia are considered emblematic of Giuntoli's work, and won him the Colpi da Maestro award by the Italian Association of Sports Directors. Giuntoli said that Kim was recommended to him by Massimiliano Maddaloni, Marcello Lippi's assistant in China, when he was still in Korea while Kvaratskhelia was recommended to him by Cristian Zaccardo when he was emerging at Rubin Kazan. Giuntoli said: "It's one thing to 'discover' a player and another to go and sign him." The transfer of Kvaratskhelia came not long after the Russian invasion of Ukraine, which Giuntoli said was the right moment to push for a transfer as there was a diaspora of Russian league players. After Spalletti, who had contacts in Russia through his time at Zenit St. Petersburg, had warned Giuntoli that competitors were about to make an offer, he signed Kvaratskhelia from Dinamo Batumi, the Georgian club where Kvaratskhelia had fled, to bring him to Italy and sign a contract in March 2022. As a result of his success at Napoli, Kvaratskhelia earned the nickname "Kvaradona".

Around the same period in which Giuntoli built the Serie A-winning squad, Napoli was close to signing players like Cristiano Ronaldo, Erling Haaland, and Zlatan Ibrahimović. In the words of James Horncastle writing for The Athletic, "Cristiano Giuntoli, the club's sporting director, had the green light to pay the buy-out clause in Erling Haaland's contract when he was a Red Bull Salzburg player. In the end, Haaland chose Borussia Dortmund instead. Zlatan Ibrahimovic was ready to move to Naples for a reunion with his old friend from Paris Saint-Germain, Carlo Ancelotti ... It begs the question: what if either deal had come off? How different would Napoli look? Would they be where they are now? The memory is refreshed to last summer when the super agent Jorge Mendes floated the idea of signing Cristiano Ronaldo. It was not the first time he'd made the suggestion and relations with Mendes have been good ever since he brokered a contract extension with Napoli's injury-stricken former full-back Faouzi Ghoulam."

After Giuntoli's exit and his 90-point Scudetto with almost 20 points ahead of the runner-up, Napoli only finished tenth with 53 points in the 2023–24 Serie A, 39 points behind Inter Milan, in what was among the worst results for a defending Italian football champion since 2000 and close to the post-Superga tragedy Torino, and significantly worse than Napoli in the 1990–91 Serie A. Nonetheless, Napoli went on to win their fourth Scudetto, the second in three years, in 2025. Although some key players signed by Giuntoli, most notably Osimhen and Kvaratskhelia, had left the club (respectively in the summer and winter transfer windows) and the new head coach Antonio Conte was widely recognised as the key to the Scudetto, many other players signed by Giuntoli helped the club to win the 2024–25 Serie A, enough to field a football formation. They included Meret (goalkeeper), Di Lorenzo (right back), Juan Jesus (centre back), Rrahmani (centre back), Olivera (left back), Lobotka (defensive midfielder), Anguissa (defensive midfielder), Politano (attacking midfielder), Raspadori (attacking midfielder), Kvaratskhelia (attacking midfielder), and Simeone (centre forward).

Upon his arrival at the Italian giants but struggling Juventus, journalist Alessandra Bacchetta said that "Giuntoli has the ability to make the environment more cohesive by adopting a management system that allows for unity of purpose between club and team. He is the one who decides but the concept is that the others work for him and with him for the good of Juventus, this is not a trivial matter." In September 2023, Il Messaggero reported that Sarri, who had won the last league title for Juventus in 2020, praised Giuntoli, with whom he had been a long-time friend. About Giuntoli, Sarri said: "Unfortunately for the other teams, he'll fix Juventus. He'll do great things because he has important qualities and courage." When his assistant Giovanni Manna moved from Juventus to become Napoli's new sporting director in 2024, Giuntoli told DAZN that "Manna was very important for me, as he introduced me to the Juventus world and I thank him for that."

Ultimately, Giuntoli's two-year tenure at Juventus proved underwhelming, only winning a Coppa Italia in 2024. As he was not able to deliver Juventus their first league title in five years while Napoli won another one in 2025, it was thought that Napoli had won out in the swap. Maifredi, the unsuccessful Juventus head coach to whom Motta was compared after the disappointing 2024–25 season, wrote on Libero about Giuntoli that he did not help Motta and that he was not "the right sporting director to turn things around in a situation that had gradually worsened" as he "let Motta flounder" when he "needed someone like Moggi to help him with his transfer decisions. But Luciano had Giraudo as manager and Bettega as advisor. Giuntoli wanted to be both manager and sporting director at the same time." Nonetheless, despite the criticism for his lack of success, in addition to delivering the club's first trophy in three years, improved finances, and a rejuvenized squad that with more time and experience could achieve better results than in 2024–25, some of Giuntoli's signings that had been criticised or questioned were re-evaluated in a more positive light. For example, those of Kelly and Alberto Costa (who was sold by Giuntoli's successor to Porto) were seen more positively and the signing of Adžić also began to show further promise at the start of the 2025–26 season.

== Personal life ==
In his private life, Giuntoli's character is seen as shy and reserved, with little to no activity on social media. He is in a relationship with Elena Rossi, an entrepreneur who is a fan of football and with whom he has one son, Alessandro, who was born in 2022. Giuntoli is a supporter of Juventus. While his father grew up idolising the likes of John Charles and Omar Sívori in the 1950s and 1960s Juventus, Giuntoli grew up reading Vladimiro Caminiti on Tuttosport and his idols were 1980s Juventus players such as Michel Platini, Zbigniew Boniek, Dino Zoff, Claudio Gentile, and Antonio Cabrini. His father drove him to Juventus' away matches, including in Florence, where they were careful not to celebrate; Bologna, where they got wet due to the rain when his mother had been told they were in the covered stands; and in Pistoia, where he recalled goals from Antonello Cuccureddu, Liam Brady, and Marco Tardelli. Together they also drove to Turin for Juventus' home matches, travelling from Prato.

Giuntoli drove to Amsterdam to watch the 1998 UEFA Champions League final between Juventus in their third consecutive Champions League final and Real Madrid, which won with an offside goal by Predrag Mijatović, which he said it still pains him decades later. His father died on 28 December 2005. Giuntoli is also a fan of cyclying. His father had a cycling team called Gruppo Sportivo San Niccolò and administrated a football team called Fulgor. His uncle Raffaello told Tuttosport that Giuntoli would work 20 hours a day but still find the time to watch the Tour de France, and that one of Fulgor's coaches gave Giuntoli his first pair of football boots. Piero Marini, a friend of the Giuntoli family and longtime head of the Aglianese youth academy, also spoke to Tuttosport about Giuntoli becoming the sporting director fo Juventus in July 2023, saying: "A dream come true because he has a family history, known to everyone here in town, of being huge Juventus fans. For a kid who grows up loving football and the Bianconeri colours, I think becoming a Juventus director is a dream come true. I think he's demonstrated the skills and passion throughout his career."
