= Michele Di Gregorio =

Italian footballer (born 1997)

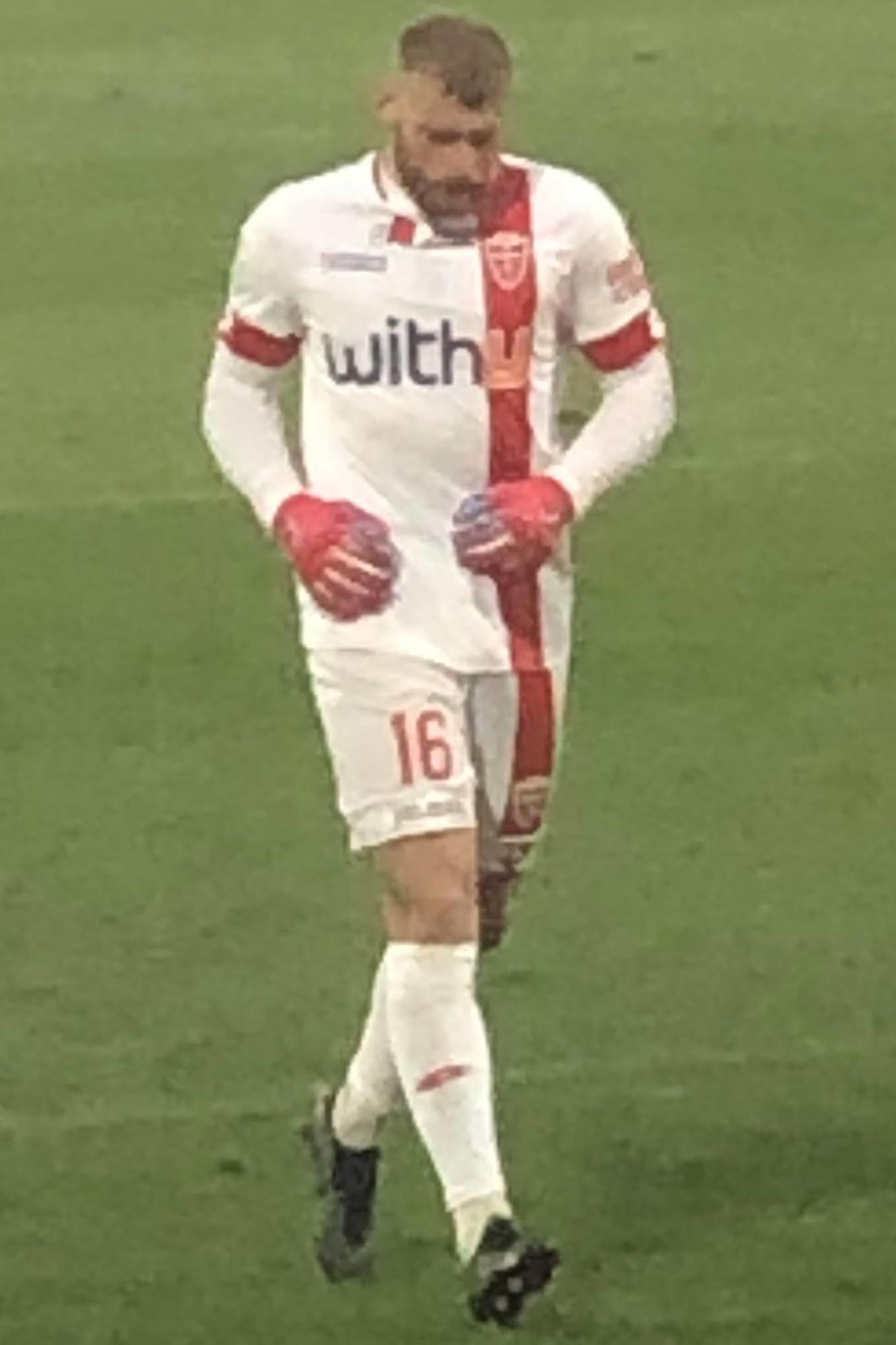
- Di Gregorio with Monza in 2021

Personal information
- Full name: Michele Di Gregorio
- Date of birth: 27 July 1997 (age 29)
- Place of birth: Milan, Italy
- Height: 1.85 m (6 ft 1 in)
- Position: Goalkeeper

Team information
- Current team: Bournemouth (on loan from Juventus)
- Number: 20

Youth career
- 2003–2017: Inter Milan

Senior career*
Years	Team	Apps	(Gls)
2017–2022	Inter Milan	0	(0)
2017–2018	→ Renate (loan)	33	(0)
2018–2019	→ Novara (loan)	30	(0)
2019–2020	→ Pordenone (loan)	33	(0)
2020–2022	→ Monza (loan)	64	(0)
2022–2025	Monza	70	(0)
2024–2025	→ Juventus (loan)	33	(0)
2025–	Juventus	30	(0)
2026–	→ Bournemouth (loan)	0	(0)

International career
2014	Italy U17	1	(0)
- * Club domestic league appearances and goals as of 23:08, 17 May 2026 (UTC)

Michele Di Gregorio (born 27 July 1997) is an Italian professional footballer who plays as a goalkeeper for Premier League club Bournemouth, on loan from Serie A club Juventus.

== Club career ==
=== Inter Milan ===
Born in Milan, Italy, Di Gregorio was a youth product of Inter Milan.

==== Loan to Renate ====
On 12 July 2017, Di Gregorio and Alessandro Mattioli were signed by Serie C side Renate on a season-long loan deal. On 30 July he made his debut for Renate in the first round of Coppa Italia in a 3–1 home win over Siracusa. On 3 September, Di Gregorio made his Serie C debut for Renate and he kept his first clean sheet in a 3–0 home win over Padova. One week later he kept his second clean sheet in a 1–0 away win over FeralpiSalò. On 16 September, Di Gregorio kept his third clean sheet in a 3–0 away win over Modena. On 17 December, Di Gregorio kept his 10th clean sheet in a 1–0 home win over Pordenone. Di Gregorio ended his season-long loan to Renate with 38 appearances, 14 clean sheets, and 36 goals conceded.

==== Loan to Novara ====
On 4 July 2018, it was announced that Di Gregorio was loaned to a Serie B club Avellino. However, he did not play any matches for the team and returned to Inter Milan. On 24 August 2018 he was loaned to Novara. On 30 September he made his Serie C debut for Novara in a 1–1 home draw against Juventus U23. On 7 October he kept his first clean sheet for Novara in a 3–0 away win over Piacenza. Three week later he kept his second clean sheet in a 2–0 away win over Pistoiese. On 18 November he kept his third clean sheet in a 0–0 away draw against Cuneo. On 12 December he was sent-off with a red card in the 90th minute of a 1–1 away draw against Alessandria. Di Gregorio ended his loan to Novara with 32 appearances, 12 clean sheets and 28 goals conceded.

==== Loan to Pordenone ====
On 10 July 2019, Di Gregorio was loaned to Serie B club Pordenone on a season-long loan deal. On 13 September he made his debut in Serie B for Pordenone and he kept his first clean sheet for the team in a 1–0 home win over Spezia. Three weeks later, on 5 October, he kept his second clean sheet in a 2–0 home win over Empoli and three more weeks later, on 26 October, he kept his third in a 0–0 home draw against Cittadella. Di Gregorio ended his season-long loan to Pordenone with 35 appearances, 41 goals conceded and 11 clean sheets, and he also help the club to reach the play-off semi-finals, however they lose 2–1 on aggregate against Frosinone.

=== Monza ===
On 27 August 2020, Di Gregorio was sent on loan for the 2020–21 season to newly-promoted Serie B club Monza, on a one-year deal with an option to buy. Following 31 appearances with Monza, 29 in the league, he was re-loaned on 29 June 2021, on a one-year deal with option to buy, counter-option for Inter Milan and conditional obligation to buy. Di Gregorio's obligation for purchase clause was triggered on 29 May 2022, after helping Monza top their first-ever Serie A promotion.

Di Gregorio made his Serie A debut on 13 August, in a 2–1 home defeat to Torino in the first matchday. He kept his first Serie A clean sheet on 18 September, after helping Monza win their first game in the top flight against Italian giants Juventus 1–0. On 7 July 2023, Di Gregorio's contract with Monza was renewed until 30 June 2027.

On 29 December 2023, Di Gregorio kept a clean sheet in a 0–0 away draw against Napoli, producing nine saves – the most by a goalkeeper in a single Serie A match that season – including a penalty stop on Matteo Pessina. He won the Serie A Best Goalkeeper award in the 2023–24 season, keeping 14 clean sheets, and conceding 35 goals in 33 games, in addition to making a league best 127 saves.

=== Juventus ===
Di Gregorio's performance made him the primary target to replace the Juventus' number one Wojciech Szczęsny as a part of the sporting director Cristiano Giuntoli's effort to rebuild the squad for the new head coach Thiago Motta's possession-based style of play, which required a goalkeeper with on-ball abilities. On 5 July 2024, Di Gregorio joined the club on a one-year loan in a deal worth €4.5 million plus performance-related bonuses up to €2M, with an obligation to buy at the end of the season for a further €13.5M.

Di Gregorio became the first-choice goalkeeper upon arrival to Juventus, but his form dropped in the 2025–26 season. Following the 0–2 defeat against Como on 21 February 2026, he lost his starting spot to Mattia Perin, who suffered an injury in April. In his last game of the season, Di Gregorio conceded two goals in a home defeat against Fiorentina, which ruled out Juventus' qualification for the Champions League. After their sixth-place finish, the club decided to overhaul their goalkeeping department, securing the loans of Guglielmo Vicario and Kamil Grabara with permanent transfer options.

=== Loan to AFC Bournemouth ===
On 25 August 2026, Di Gregorio joined the English Premier League club Bournemouth on a one-year loan for €1.3 million with the buy-out option set at €12.7M. He made his debut in the EFL Cup game against Lincoln City, with Đorđe Petrović remaining the Bournemouth's first-choice goalkeeper in the Premier League and Europa League matches.

== International career ==
On 19 February 2014, Di Gregorio made his Italy under-17 debut as a substitute, replacing Emil Audero in the 59th minute of a 6–0 home win over Hungary U17.

In October 2024, he was selected for the senior Italy squad for 2024–25 UEFA Nations League matches against Belgium and Israel on 10 and 14 October 2024, respectively.

== Style of play ==
During his time at Monza, Di Gregorio established himself as one of the best goalkeepers in Italy, standing out for his shot-stopping ability, his ability to keep clean sheets while producing many saves, stop penalties, and distribute the ball effectively and launch attacks; he was named the Serie A Best Goalkeeper of the 2023–24 season for his performances, and drew praise from former Juventus and Italy goalkeeper Gianluigi Buffon, even being touted as a potential successor to him at the Turin-based side. Upon signing with Juventus, his club profile described him as an "all-round goalkeeper," with a "modern" style, who possessed good reflexes and shot-stopping abilities, in addition to being adept at playing with his feet. During the latter half of his second season at the club, however, he suffered a decline in form, which led his shot-stopping ability to be brought into question by several pundits, in particular following a series of poor performances in Serie A and the Coppa Italia, which led him to be dropped from the starting line-up in favour of Mattia Perin.

== Personal life ==
Di Gregorio is affectionately nicknamed "L'Uomo Digre", a play on words in reference to television anime Tiger Mask (L'Uomo Tigre in Italian). He and his partner Samantha have a son named Marcello (b. 2020).

== Career statistics ==
=== Club ===
As of match played 8 September 2026

Appearances and goals by club, season and competition
Club	Season	League			National cup (Note: Includes Coppa Italia)		League cup (Note: Includes EFL Cup)		Europe		Other		Total	
Club	Season	League	Apps	Goals	Apps	Goals	Apps	Goals	Apps	Goals	Apps	Goals	Apps	Goals
Renate (loan)	2017–18	Serie C	33	0	3	0	—		—		1 (Note: Appearance(s) in Serie C promotion play-offs)	0	37	0
Novara (loan)	2018–19	Serie C	30	0	0	0	—		—		2	0	32	0
Pordenone (loan)	2019–20	Serie B	33	0	0	0	—		—		2 (Note: Appearances in Serie B promotion play-offs)	0	35	0
Monza (loan)	2020–21	Serie B	27	0	2	0	—		—		2	0	31	0
Monza (loan)	2021–22	Serie B	37	0	1	0	—		—		4	0	42	0
Monza	2022–23	Serie A	37	0	0	0	—		—		—		37	0
Monza	2023–24	Serie A	33	0	4	0	—		—		—		34	0
Monza	Monza total		134	0	1	0	—		—		6	0	144	0
Juventus (loan)	2024–25	Serie A	33	0	1	0	—		8 (Note: Appearances in UEFA Champions League)	0	5 (Note: One appearance in Supercoppa Italiana, four appearances in FIFA Club World Cup)	0	47	0
Juventus	2025–26	Serie A	30	0	1	0	—		6	0	—		37	0
Juventus	Juventus total		63	0	2	0	—		14	0	5	0	84	0
Bournemouth (loan)	2026–27	Premier League	0	0	0	0	1	0	1	0	—		2	0
Career total			293	0	9	0	1	0	15	0	16	0	334	0

== Honours ==
Inter Milan Primavera

- Campionato Nazionale Primavera: 2016–17

Individual

- Serie A Best Goalkeeper: 2023–24
