= Vasilije Adžić =

Montenegrin footballer (born 2006)

Personal information
- Full name: Vasilije Adžić
- Date of birth: 12 May 2006 (age 20)
- Place of birth: Nikšić, Serbia and Montenegro
- Height: 1.87 m (6 ft 2 in)
- Position: Midfielder

Team information
- Current team: Sassuolo (on loan from Juventus)
- Number: 17

Youth career
- 2016–2020: Polet Stars
- 2020–2022: Budućnost

Senior career*
Years	Team	Apps	(Gls)
2022–2024	Budućnost	58	(9)
2024–2025	Juventus Next Gen	10	(4)
2024–	Juventus	16	(1)
2026–	→ Sassuolo (loan)	5	(3)

International career^{‡}
2021	Montenegro U15	4	(1)
2021	Montenegro U16	6	(2)
2021–2023	Montenegro U17	28	(6)
2022	Montenegro U18	1	(0)
2023–	Montenegro U19	7	(5)
2023–	Montenegro U21	4	(1)
2025–	Montenegro	12	(4)
- * Club domestic league appearances and goals as of 07:48, 19 September 2026 (UTC) ‡ National team caps and goals as of 15 November 2026

Vasilije Adžić (born 12 May 2006) is a Montenegrin professional footballer who plays as a midfielder for Serie A club Sassuolo, on loan from Juventus, and the Montenegro national team.

== Club career ==
=== Budućnost ===
Adžić was born in Nikšić, at the time still part of Serbia and Montenegro, on 12 May 2006. He came through the youth systems of Polet Stars, based in his hometown, and Budućnost. He signed a scholarship contract with Budućnost in April 2022, and made his senior debut on 28 August 2022, aged 16 years and 108 days, scoring with a long-range chip in a 4–0 win over Arsenal Tivat. The goal made him the youngest scorer in Budućnost's history and the second-youngest in the Montenegrin First League, behind Ilija Vukotić (16 years, 73 days).

Adžić made 23 appearances and scored three goals in his first professional season, with Budućnost finishing first in the Montenegrin First League. The following season, he became a regular starter for the team, appearing in 44 matches and scoring eight goals: six in the league, where Budućnost finished in second place; one in the victorious Montenegrin Cup; and another, a free kick, in the UEFA Conference League qualifiers in the return match against Struga, where he also provided an assist in 86 minutes of play. This was not enough as Budućnost lost 3–4 (3–5 on aggregate). As a result of his performances, he was considered among the best players in Balkan football, and among the best youngsters of 2023.

=== Juventus ===
On 11 July 2024, Serie A side Juventus announced the signing of Adžić on a three-year contract, with a reported €5.3 million fee. He was initially expected to join Juventus Next Gen, the club's reserve team in Serie C, before being promoted to the first team. Eventually, Adžić's rapid progress managed to impress manager Thiago Motta and his staff during pre-season, earning himself a spot with the Juventus senior team for the 2024–25 season. He missed the first three matches of the season due to an injury and rejoined the team during the international break in September 2024.

Adžić made his debut for the club on 19 October 2024, coming on as a substitute for Khéphren Thuram in the 72nd minute of a 1–0 Serie A win over Lazio. Three days later, he appeared in the UEFA Champions League for the first time, replacing Dušan Vlahović in the 68th minute of a 1–0 defeat to Stuttgart. On 12 December 2024, he made his Coppa Italia debut, a 4–0 home win over Cagliari, replacing Vlahović in the 81st minute. In the meantime, he was involved with Juventus Next Gen, making his debut as a starter on 31 October 2024, in a 0–1 Serie C defeat to Sorrento.

On 9 February 2025, Adžić scored his first goal, a free kick in a 2–0 win against Benevento. On 12 March, he earned a penalty kick that allowed Juve Next Gen to win against Sorrento as the club fought to reach the Serie C promotion play-offs, after having been at one point last in the table. Overall, he scored four goals and provided two assists in 10 Serie C games in 2024–25. Despite being linked to several clubs, including Genoa, Lecce, Palermo, Sassuolo, Braga, and a Bundesliga club, through a loan, having achieved little play time in the first team, he ultimately stayed at Juventus.

Having been promoted to the first team on a permanent basis ahead of the 2025–26 season, Adžić replaced Teun Koopmeiners in the 73rd minute and scored his first Serie A goal, a stoppage-time winner from outside the area in a 4–3 Derby d'Italia win against Inter Milan on 13 September 2025, after a VAR check. In doing so at 19 years and 124 days, he became the youngest foreign player for Juventus and the youngest overall (overtaking teammate Kenan Yıldız) to score a goal in the Derby d'Italia. Within the context of the Juventus–Inter Milan rivalry, it was observed that Zinedine Zidane also had scored his first Serie A goal against Inter in 1996 and that Adžić was born the same day Juventus were controversially hit by Calciopoli, and how it was fitting his first goal with the club was against Inter. Adžić himself stated that he dreamed of scoring a goal like that. In the second leg of the Champions League play-off game against Galatasary on 25 February 2026, he was heavily criticized by the Italian press for a mistake that allowed Victor Osimhen to give Galatasaray the lead and cost Juventus the elimination from the cup.

=== Sassuolo ===
On 3 August 2026, he was loaned out to Sassuolo for €0.5M with option to buy for €12M and a €13.7 redemption clause. On 13 September, he decided a home match against Juventus themselves, scoring in stoppage time to make it 3–2.

== International career ==
Adžić has represented Montenegro at numerous youth international levels. He received his first call-up by Robert Prosinečki to the senior Montenegro national team for the UEFA Nations League matches against Iceland and Wales in September 2024 but missed both matches due to an injury. On 10 June 2025, alongside Andrija Bulatović, Adžić debuted and scored his first goal for the Montenegro senior squad in a 2–2 home friendly draw against Armenia.

== Style of play ==
Regarded as a highly versatile player, standing at 1.87 m (6 ft 2 in), Adžić began his career as an attacking midfielder or left- winger. On occasion, he has also been played at striker, and he can also operate as a central midfielder. Adžić is a right-footed player who combines his physical strength with speed and technical ability, and is proficient in aerial play. He is also effective when shooting, where he is noted for his creativity and accuracy from both long range and in set pieces.

Owing to his qualities, Adžić has been compared to Kevin De Bruyne and Steven Gerrard, while being inspired by Lionel Messi. On 11 October 2023, he was named by English newspaper The Guardian as one of the most talented footballers born in 2006 worldwide. To the journalists present who had asked him who his source of inspiration was while at the Juventus training camp in 2024, he answered: "I am Adžić."

== Career statistics ==
=== Club ===
As of match played 18 September 2026

Appearances and goals by club, season and competition
Club	Season	League			National cup (Note: Includes Montenegrin Cup, Coppa Italia)		Europe		Other		Total	
Club	Season	Division	Apps	Goals	Apps	Goals	Apps	Goals	Apps	Goals	Apps	Goals
Budućnost	2022–23	1. CFL	23	3	1	0	0	0	—		24	3
Budućnost	2023–24	1. CFL	35	6	5	1	4 (Note: Two appearances in UEFA Champions League, two appearances and one goal in UEFA Europa Conference League)	1	—		44	8
Budućnost	Total		58	9	6	1	4	1	0	0	68	11
Juventus Next Gen	2024–25	Serie C	10	4	—		—		0	0	10	4
Juventus	2024–25	Serie A	6	0	1	0	1 (Note: Appearance(s) in UEFA Champions League)	0	1 (Note: Appearance in FIFA Club World Cup)	0	9	0
Juventus	2025–26	Serie A	10	1	0	0	7	0	—		17	1
Juventus	Total		16	1	1	0	8	0	1	0	26	1
Sassuolo (loan)	2026–27	Serie A	5	3	1	1	—		0	0	6	4
Career total			89	17	8	2	12	1	1	0	110	20

=== International ===
As of match played 15 November 2026

Appearances and goals by national team and year
National team	Year	Apps	Goals
Montenegro	2025	6	2
Montenegro	2026	6	2
Total		12	4

Scores and results list Montenegro's goal tally first, score column indicates score after each Adžić goal.

List of international goals scored by Vasilije Adžić
No.	Date	Venue	Opponent	Score	Result	Competition
1	9 June 2025	Gradski stadion, Nikšić, Montenegro	Armenia	1–1	2–2	Friendly
2	14 November 2025	Europa Sports Park, Gibraltar	Gibraltar	1–1	2–1	2026 FIFA World Cup qualification
3	2 October 2026	Skonto Stadium, Riga, Latvia	Latvia	1–0	2–1	2026–27 UEFA Nations League C
4	2 October 2026	Skonto Stadium, Riga, Latvia	Latvia	2–0	2–1	2026–27 UEFA Nations League C

== Honours ==
Budućnost

- Montenegrin First League: 2022–23
- Montenegrin Cup: 2023–24

Individual

- Serie A Goal of the Month: September 2025
