= Nicolò Savona =

Italian footballer (born 2003)

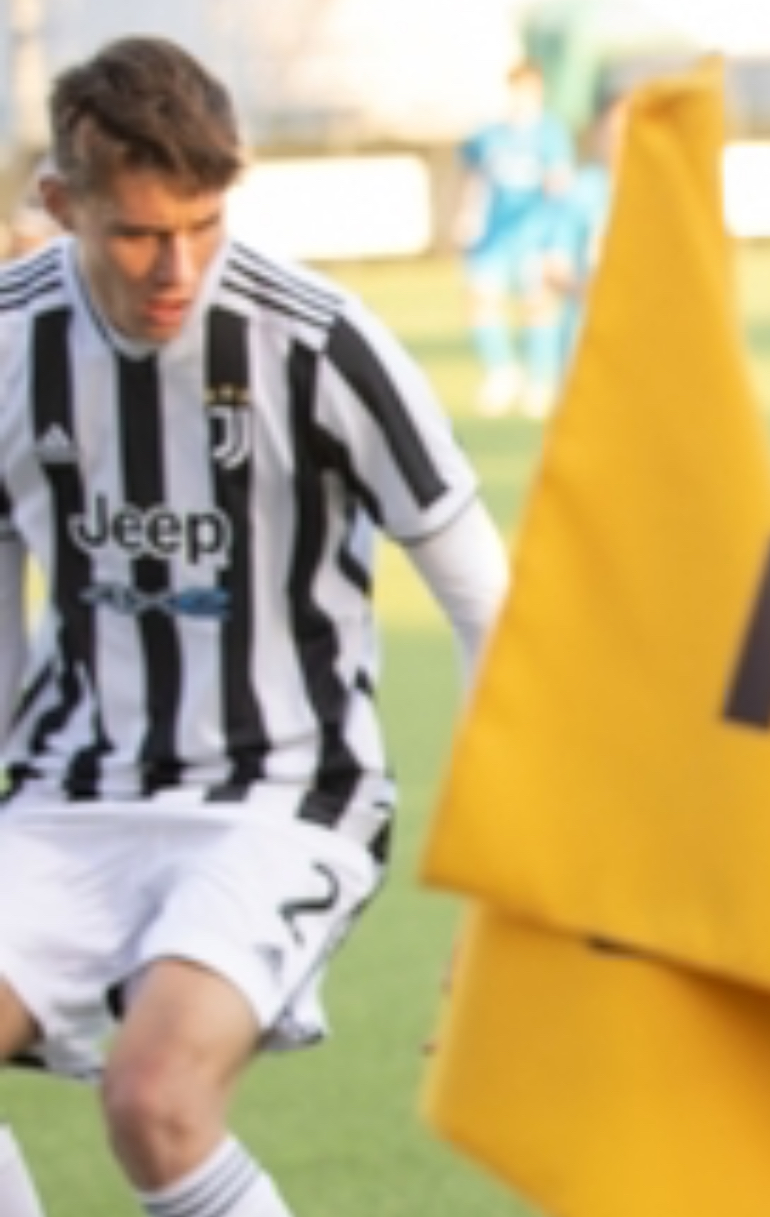
- Savona with Juventus U19 in 2021

Personal information
- Date of birth: 19 March 2003 (age 23)
- Place of birth: Aosta, Italy
- Height: 1.92 m (6 ft 4 in)
- Positions: Full-back; centre-back

Team information
- Current team: Nottingham Forest
- Number: 37

Youth career
- 2010–2011: Aygreville
- 2011–2022: Juventus
- 2020–2021: → SPAL (loan)

Senior career*
Years	Team	Apps	(Gls)
2022–2024	Juventus Next Gen	50	(0)
2024–2025	Juventus	28	(2)
2025–	Nottingham Forest	14	(2)

International career^{‡}
2022	Italy U20	1	(0)
2024–	Italy U21	3	(0)
- * Club domestic league appearances and goals as of 7 January 2026 ‡ National team caps and goals as of 15 October 2024

Nicolò Savona (born 19 March 2003) is an Italian professional footballer who plays as a full-back or centre-back for Premier League club Nottingham Forest.

== Club career ==
Savona was born in Aosta, in northwestern Italy. He is a youth product of Aygreville, and moved to Juventus' youth academy at the age of 8. He had a loan with the S.P.A.L. academy for the 2020–21 season. A mainstay of their Primavera team, he signed his first professional contract with Juventus on 16 December 2021 until 2024. He made his professional debut with Juventus Next Gen in a 2–1 Serie C loss to Feralpisalò on 30 November 2022.

On 19 August 2024, Savona made his debut for Juventus in the first matchday of the 2024–25 Serie A season, in a 3–0 win against Como. In the following fixture, a 3–0 away win against Hellas Verona, he scored his first Serie A goal on his debut as a starter. On 12 June 2025, he extended his contract with Juventus until 2030.

On 30 August 2025, Premier League side Nottingham Forest announced the signing of Savona on a five-year contract. On 1 November, he scored his first goal for Nottingham Forest in a 2–2 draw with Manchester United.

== International career ==
Savona is a youth international for Italy, having played for the Italy U20s in a friendly tournament in June 2022.

On 8 November 2024, head coach Luciano Spalletti included Savona in the Italy senior team squad for UEFA Nations League fixtures against Belgium and France.

== Career statistics ==
As of match played 22 January 2026

Appearances and goals by club, season and competition
Club	Season	League			National cup (Note: Includes Coppa Italia Serie C, Coppa Italia, FA Cup)		League cup (Note: Includes EFL Cup)		Europe		Other		Total	
Club	Season	Division	Apps	Goals	Apps	Goals	Apps	Goals	Apps	Goals	Apps	Goals	Apps	Goals
Juventus Next Gen	2022–23	Serie C	17	0	3	0	—		—		—		20	0
Juventus Next Gen	2023–24	Serie C	33	0	2	0	—		—		6 (Note: Appearances in Serie C promotion play-offs)	2	41	2
Juventus Next Gen	Total		50	0	5	0	—		—		6	2	61	2
Juventus	2024–25	Serie A	28	2	1	0	—		7 (Note: Appearances in UEFA Champions League)	0	4 (Note: One appearance in Supercoppa Italiana, three appearances in FIFA Club World Cup)	0	40	2
Juventus	Total		28	2	1	0	—		7	0	4	0	40	2
Nottingham Forest	2025-26	Premier League	14	2	1	0	1	0	4 (Note: Appearances in UEFA Europa League)	0	—		20	2
Career total			92	4	7	0	1	0	11	0	10	2	121	6
