= Alberto Costa (footballer, born 2003) =

Portuguese footballer

Personal information
- Full name: Alberto Oliveira Baio
- Date of birth: 29 September 2003 (age 23)
- Place of birth: Santo Tirso, Portugal
- Height: 1.86 m (6 ft 1 in)
- Position: Right-back

Team information
- Current team: Porto
- Number: 20

Youth career
- 2013–2022: Vitória de Guimarães

Senior career*
Years	Team	Apps	(Gls)
2022–2024	Vitória de Guimarães B	45	(3)
2024–2025	Vitória de Guimarães	11	(0)
2025	Juventus	9	(0)
2025–	Porto	38	(1)

International career^{‡}
2021	Portugal U18	2	(0)
2023	Portugal U20	2	(0)
2026–	Portugal	2	(0)
- * Club domestic league appearances and goals as of 19:05, 31 October 2026 (UTC) ‡ National team caps and goals as of 23:12, 17 November 2026 (UTC)

Alberto Oliveira Baio (born 29 September 2003), known as Alberto Costa, is a Portuguese footballer who plays as a right-back for Primeira Liga club Porto and the Portugal national team.

Costa spent his entire youth career at Vitória de Guimarães, where he made his debuts for the reserve and first teams, the latter in the Primeira Liga. In January 2025, he moved to Juventus for an initial €12.5 million fee, moving back to Portugal with Porto for €15 million six months later. He was part of the team that won the 2025–26 Primeira Liga and was named in the Team of the Year.

Costa represented Portugal at under-18 and under-20 level, and made his senior international debut in 2026.

== Club career ==
=== Vitória de Guimarães ===
Born in Santo Tirso in the Porto metropolitan area, Costa joined the youth ranks of Vitória de Guimarães in 2013. He was promoted to the under-23 team when he was 17, and after playing one game for them and having trained with the B-team, he signed a three-year contract in April 2021; the release clause was €30 million.

Costa began training with the first team in October 2023, and was included in matchday squads under manager Álvaro Pacheco. The following 11 January, he made his first-team debut in the fifth round of the Taça de Portugal, in a 1–0 home win over Penafiel; he played the final minutes as a substitute after Miguel Maga's muscular injury. His league debut was his only game of the Primeira Liga season, 15 minutes off the bench in a 3–0 loss away to Sporting CP on 21 April 2024.

Costa signed a contract extension on 17 October 2024, keeping him at the Estádio D. Afonso Henriques until June 2028. He scored his first goal on 12 December in a UEFA Conference League league phase match away to St. Gallen, helping to a 4–1 win in Switzerland.

=== Juventus ===
On 15 January 2025, Costa transferred to Juventus on a contract lasting until July 2029. The transfer fee was €12.5 million over four financial years, €1.3 million in additional fees and up to €2.5 million in bonuses. During an injury crisis with five defenders missing, he made his debut on 26 February in the quarter-finals of the Coppa Italia at home to Empoli, playing the final six minutes in place of Andrea Cambiaso as his team drew 1–1 and lost on penalties. Five days later he made his Serie A debut in a 2–0 win over Hellas Verona at Juventus Stadium, playing the final half-hour as a substitute.

Costa played 14 games for the club from Turin, assisting three goals. He made four appearances at the 2025 FIFA Club World Cup in the United States, in which he and Khéphren Thuram each set up two goals in a 5–0 opening win over Al Ain of the United Arab Emirates.

=== Porto ===
On 24 July 2025, Costa returned to his homeland's top flight by signing for Porto. He joined on a five-year deal for a transfer fee of €15 million, with a potential €1 million in bonuses and a €65 million buyout fee; Juventus retained 10% of a future transfer fee. He had previously been approached by rivals Sporting CP.

Costa made his debut for Porto on 11 August 2025 in a 3–0 home win over his former club Vitória Guimarães. He assisted the second goal, scored by Samu Aghehowa. He played 29 games as his team won the league in his first season, and he was named in the Team of the Season; the club conceded 18 goals all season and took four of the defensive and goalkeeper positions in the select team. He scored his first goal for Porto on 4 April 2026 in a 2–2 draw at home to Famalicão. After the match, opponent Sorriso accused Costa of spitting at him, which Costa denied. A month later, the disciplinary commission of the Portuguese Football Federation closed its investigation due to finding no video evidence.

== International career ==
Costa was first called up for the Portugal under-18 team for two friendly matches against Norway in Lisbon in June 2021. In March 2023, he was capped twice for the under-20 team against Romania and the Czech Republic.

In November 2026, Costa was called up for the first time to the senior national team for UEFA Nations League matches against Denmark and Wales. He started against the Danes on 14 November, becoming the first international debutant under Jorge Jesus, but his side lost 4–1 at the Estádio Municipal de Braga.

== Personal life ==
Though not one of his legal surnames, Costa chose the surname for his career, in tribute to his stepfather who raised him from an early age.

== Career statistics ==
=== Club ===
As of match played 4 November 2026

Appearances and goals by club, season and competition
Club	Season	League			National cup (Note: Includes Taça de Portugal, Coppa Italia)		League cup (Note: Includes Taça da Liga)		Europe		Other		Total	
Club	Season	Division	Apps	Goals	Apps	Goals	Apps	Goals	Apps	Goals	Apps	Goals	Apps	Goals
Vitória de Guimarães B	2021–22	Liga 3	4	0	—		—		—		—		4	0
Vitória de Guimarães B	2022–23	Liga 3	19	1	—		—		—		—		19	1
Vitória de Guimarães B	2023–24	Campeonato de Portugal	22	2	—		—		—		—		22	2
Vitória de Guimarães B	Total		45	3	—		—		—		—		45	3
Vitória de Guimarães	2023–24	Primeira Liga	1	0	1	0	—		—		—		2	0
Vitória de Guimarães	2024–25	Primeira Liga	10	0	3	0	1	0	7 (Note: Appearances in UEFA Conference League)	1	—		21	1
Vitória de Guimarães	Total		11	0	4	0	1	0	7	1	—		23	1
Juventus	2024–25	Serie A	9	0	1	0	—		0	0	4 (Note: Appearances in FIFA Club World Cup)	0	14	0
Porto	2025–26	Primeira Liga	29	1	6	0	1	0	11 (Note: Appearances in UEFA Europa League)	0	—		47	1
Porto	2026–27	Primeira Liga	9	0	0	0	0	0	4 (Note: Appearances in UEFA Champions League)	0	1 (Note: Appearance in Supertaça Cândido de Oliveira)	0	14	0
Porto	Total		38	1	6	0	1	0	15	0	5	0	61	1
Career total			103	4	11	0	2	0	22	1	5	0	143	5

=== International ===
As of match played 17 November 2026

Appearances and goals by national team and year
National team	Year	Apps	Goals
Portugal	2026	2	0
Total		2	0

== Honours ==
Porto

- Primeira Liga: 2025–26
- Supertaça Cândido de Oliveira: 2026

Individual

- Primeira Liga Team of the Season: 2025–26
