= 2024–25 Juventus FC season =

Italian football club season

Juventus
2024–25 season
- Chairman: Gianluca Ferrero
- Head coach: Thiago Motta (until 23 March); Igor Tudor (from 23 March)
- Stadium: Juventus Stadium
- Serie A: 4th
- Coppa Italia: Quarter-finals
- Supercoppa Italiana: Semi-finals
- UEFA Champions League: Knockout phase play-offs
- FIFA Club World Cup: Round of 16
- Top goalscorer: League: Dušan Vlahović (10); All: Dušan Vlahović (17)
- Highest home attendance: 41,402 vs Benfica (29 January 2025, Champions League)
- Lowest home attendance: 36,215 vs Hellas Verona (3 March 2025, Serie A)
- Average home league attendance: 40,237
- Biggest win: Juventus 5–0 Al Ain
- Biggest defeat: Juventus 0–4 Atalanta
Home colours	Away colours	Third colours

The 2024–25 season was Juventus Football Club's 127th season in existence and their 18th consecutive season in the top flight of Italian football. In addition to the domestic league, Juventus competed in the Coppa Italia, the Supercoppa Italiana, the UEFA Champions League and the FIFA Club World Cup.

== Players ==
=== Squad information ===
Appearances and goals include all official competition matches.
Note: Flags indicate national team as has been defined under FIFA eligibility rules. Players may hold more than one non-FIFA nationality.

No.	Player	Nat.	Position(s)	Date of birth (age)	Signed in	Contract ends	Signed from	Transfer fee	Apps.	Goals
Goalkeepers
1	Mattia Perin	(Italy)	GK	10 November 1992 (age 34)	2018	2027	(Italy) Genoa	€12M	55	0
23	Carlo Pinsoglio	(Italy)	GK	16 March 1990 (age 36)	2014	2026	(Italy) Vicenza	€0.7M	6	0
29	Michele Di Gregorio	(Italy)	GK	27 July 1997 (age 29)	2024	2025	(Italy) Monza	€4.5M (loan)	47	0
Defenders
2	Alberto Costa	(Portugal)	RB	29 September 2003 (age 23)	2024	2029	(Portugal) Vitória de Guimarães	€13.8M	14	0
3	Bremer	(Brazil)	CB	18 March 1997 (age 29)	2022	2029	(Italy) Torino	€41M	91	8
4	Federico Gatti	(Italy)	CB	24 June 1998 (age 28)	2022	2028	(Italy) Frosinone	€5.4M	109	7
6	Lloyd Kelly	(England)	CB / LB	6 October 1998 (age 28)	2025	2025	(England) Newcastle	€3.8M (loan)	19	0
15	Pierre Kalulu	(France)	CB / RB	5 June 2000 (age 26)	2024	2025	(Italy) Milan	€3.3M(loan)	43	1
24	Daniele Rugani	(Italy)	CB	29 July 1994 (aged 29)	2015	2026	(Italy) Empoli	€3.5M	149	11
27	Andrea Cambiaso	(Italy)	RB / RWB / LB / LWB	20 February 2000 (age 26)	2022	2029	(Italy) Genoa	€8.8M	85	5
32	Juan Cabal	(Colombia)	CB / LB	8 January 2001 (age 25)	2024	2029	(Italy) Hellas Verona	€12.8M	9	0
37	Nicolò Savona	(Italy)	RB / CB	19 March 2003 (age 23)	2022	2030	(Italy) Youth Sector	N/A	40	2
40	Jonas Rouhi	(Sweden)	LB / LWB	7 January 2004 (age 22)	2023	2028	(Italy) Youth Sector	N/A	6	0
Midfielders
5	Manuel Locatelli (c)	(Italy)	CM / DM	8 January 1998 (age 28)	2021	2028	(Italy) Sassuolo	€30M	183	6
8	Teun Koopmeiners	(Netherlands)	CM / DM / AM	28 February 1998 (age 28)	2024	2029	(Italy) Atalanta	€54.7M	44	5
16	Weston McKennie	(United States)	CM / RB / RWB	28 August 1998 (age 28)	2020	2026	(Germany) Schalke 04	€22M	151	13
17	Vasilije Adžić	(Montenegro)	CM / AM	12 May 2006 (age 20)	2024	2027	(Montenegro) Budućnost	€2M	9	0
18	Filip Kostić	(Serbia)	LWB / LW	1 November 1992 (aged 31)	2022	2026	(Germany) Eintracht Frankfurt	€12M	89	3
19	Khéphren Thuram	(France)	CM	26 March 2001 (age 25)	2024	2029	(France) Nice	€20M	51	5
26	Douglas Luiz	(Brazil)	CM	9 May 1998 (age 28)	2024	2029	(England) Aston Villa	€50M	27	0
Forwards
7	Francisco Conceição	(Portugal)	RW / LW	14 December 2002 (age 23)	2024	2025	(Portugal) Porto	€7M (loan)	40	7
9	Dušan Vlahović	(Serbia)	ST	28 January 2000 (age 26)	2022	2026	(Italy) Fiorentina	€70M	145	58
10	Kenan Yıldız	(Turkey)	AM	4 May 2005 (age 21)	2023	2029	(Italy) Youth Sector	N/A	84	16
11	Nicolás González	(Argentina)	AM / RW / LW	6 April 1998 (age 28)	2024	2025	(Italy) Fiorentina	€8.4M (loan)	38	5
14	Arkadiusz Milik	(Poland)	ST	28 February 1994 (age 32)	2022	2027	(France) Marseille	€6.3M	75	17
20	Randal Kolo Muani	(France)	ST	5 December 1998 (age 27)	2025	2025	(France) Paris Saint-Germain	€3.6M (loan)	22	10
22	Timothy Weah	(United States)	RWB / RW / LW / AM	22 February 2000 (age 26)	2023	2028	(France) Lille	€10.3M	78	7
36	Lorenzo Anghelè	(Italy)	ST	26 February 2005 (age 21)	2023	2028	(Italy) Youth Sector	N/A	1	0
44	Diego Pugno	(Italy)	ST	7 July 2006 (age 20)	2024	2026	(Italy) Youth Sector	N/A	1	0
51	Samuel Mbangula	(Belgium)	AM / LW / RW	16 January 2004 (age 22)	2023	2028	(Italy) Youth Sector	N/A	32	4
Players transferred during the season
6	Danilo (c)	(Brazil)	CB / RB / LB	15 July 1991 (age 35)	2019	2025	(England) Manchester City	€37M	213	9
12	Renato Veiga	(Portugal)	CB / LB	29 July 2003 (age 23)	2025	2025	(England) Chelsea	€4M (loan)	15	0
18	Arthur	(Brazil)	CM	12 August 1996 (aged 25)	2020	2026	(Spain) Barcelona	€72M	31	1
21	Nicolò Fagioli	(Italy)	CM / DM	12 February 2001 (age 25)	2020	2028	(Italy) Youth Sector	N/A	69	3

== Transfers ==
=== Summer 2024 ===
==== In ====
Date	Pos.	Player	Age	Moving from	Fee	Notes	Source
30 June 2024	MF	(Brazil) Douglas Luiz	26	(England) Aston Villa	€50M	Payable in four financial years plus addition of ancillary costs up to €1.5M	
1 July 2024	MF	(Brazil) Arthur	27	(Italy) Fiorentina	N/A	End of loan	
5 July 2024	GK	(Italy) Michele Di Gregorio	26	(Italy) Monza	€4.5M	On loan until June 2025 with obligation to buy for €13.5M and variables for €2M	
10 July 2024	MF	(France) Khéphren Thuram	23	(France) Nice	€20M	Payable in three financial years plus addition of ancillary costs up to €0.6M	
11 July 2024	MF	(Montenegro) Vasilije Adžić	18	(Montenegro) Budućnost	€2M	Variables for €3M	
18 July 2024	DF	(Colombia) Juan Cabal	23	(Italy) Hellas Verona	€12.8M	Variables for €2M	
21 August 2024	DF	(France) Pierre Kalulu	24	(Italy) Milan	€3.3M	On loan until June 2025 with option to buy for €14M and variables for €4M	
25 August 2024	FW	(Argentina) Nicolás González	26	(Italy) Fiorentina	€8.4M	On loan until June 2025 with option to buy for €28.1M and variables for €5M	
27 August 2024	FW	(Portugal) Francisco Conceição	21	(Portugal) Porto	€7M	On loan until June 2025 with option to buy for €30M and variables for €3M	
28 August 2024	MF	(Netherlands) Teun Koopmeiners	26	(Italy) Atalanta	€54.7M	Variables for €6M	

==== Out ====
Date	Pos.	Player	Age	Moving to	Fee	Notes	Source
1 July 2024	MF	(Argentina) Carlos Alcaraz	21	(England) Southampton	N/A	End of loan	
1 July 2024	MF	(England) Samuel Iling-Junior	20	(England) Aston Villa	€14M	Variables for €3M	
1 July 2024	MF	(France) Adrien Rabiot	29	(France) Marseille	Free	End of contract	
9 July 2024	FW	(Italy) Moise Kean	24	(Italy) Fiorentina	€13M	Variables for €5M	
21 August 2024	DF	(Italy) Daniele Rugani	30	(Netherlands) Ajax	Free	On loan until his expiration contract in June 2025	
22 August 2024	MF	(Italy) Hans Nicolussi Caviglia	24	(Italy) Venezia	N/A	On loan until June 2025 with option to buy for €4M and €1M variables	
25 August 2024	MF	(Italy) Fabio Miretti	21	(Italy) Genoa	N/A	On loan until June 2025	
26 August 2024	DF	(Brazil) Alex Sandro	32	(Brazil) Flamengo	Free	End of contract	
27 August 2024	GK	(Poland) Wojciech Szczęsny	34	(Spain) Barcelona	Free	Released	
29 August 2024	DF	(Italy) Mattia De Sciglio	31	(Italy) Empoli	Free	On loan until his expiration contract in June 2025	
29 August 2024	FW	(Italy) Federico Chiesa	26	(England) Liverpool	€12M	Variables for €3M	
30 August 2024	MF	(Belgium) Joseph Nonge	19	(France) Troyes	N/A	On loan until June 2025 with option to buy	
2 September 2024	DF	(Portugal) Tiago Djaló	24	(Portugal) Porto	N/A	On loan until June 2025	
9 September 2024	MF	(Serbia) Filip Kostić	31	(Turkey) Fenerbahçe	N/A	On loan until June 2025 with option to buy	

==== Other acquisitions ====
Date	Pos.	Player	Age	Moving from	Fee	Notes	Source
1 July 2024	DF	(Italy) Alessandro Citi	21	(Italy) Pro Vercelli	N/A	End of loan to play for Juventus Next Gen	
1 July 2024	DF	(Brazil) Pedro Felipe	19	(Brazil) Palmeiras	€0.3M	Renewal of loan until June 2025 with option to buy for €2.3M, to play for Juventus Next Gen	
1 July 2024	MF	(Italy) Nicolò Ledonne	20	(Italy) Pianese	N/A	End of loan to play for Juventus Next Gen	
1 July 2024	MF	(Belgium) Daouda Peeters	25	(Italy) Südtirol	N/A	End of loan to play for Juventus Next Gen	
1 July 2024	FW	(Italy) Nicolò Cudrig	21	(Italy) Perugia	N/A	End of loan to play for Juventus Next Gen	
11 July 2024	DF	(Italy) Filippo Scaglia	32	(Italy) Südtirol	Free	To play for Juventus Next Gen	
12 July 2024	MF	(Italy) Luca Aramadio	18	(Italy) Derthona	Undisclosed	To play for Juventus Next Gen	
13 July 2024	DF	(Austria) David Puczka	19	(Austria) Admira Wacker	Undisclosed	To play for Juventus Next Gen	
16 July 2024	MF	(Italy) Federico Macca	20	(Italy) Virtus Entella	Undisclosed	To play for Juventus Next Gen	
30 July 2024	FW	(Argentina) Juan Ignacio Quattrocchi	20	(Argentina) Estudiantes	Free	To play for Juventus Next Gen	
9 August 2024	DF	(Italy) Riccardo Stivanello	19	(Italy) Bologna	Undisclosed	Renewal of loan, to play for Juventus Next Gen	
22 August 2024	MF	(Greece) Christos Papadopoulos	19	(Italy) Genoa	Undisclosed	Loan until June 2025 with option to buy, to play for Juventus Next Gen	
30 August 2024	MF	(Italy) Giacomo Faticanti	20	(Italy) Lecce	N/A	On loan until June 2025 to play for Juventus Next Gen with option to buy	
30 August 2024	FW	(Ghana) Felix Afena-Gyan	21	(Italy) Cremonese	N/A	On loan until June 2025 to play for Juventus Next Gen	
30 August 2024	FW	(Portugal) Luís Semedo	21	(England) Sunderland	N/A	On loan until June 2025 to play for Juventus Next Gen	

==== Other disposals ====
Date	Pos.	Player	Age	Moving to	Fee	Notes	Source
11 June 2024	FW	(Brazil) Kaio Jorge	22	(Brazil) Cruzeiro	€7.2M	Payable in three financial years and variables for future sale	
1 July 2024	DF	(Belgium) Koni De Winter	22	(Italy) Genoa	€8M	Redeem after loan and variables for €2M	
1 July 2024	MF	(Argentina) Enzo Barrenechea	23	(England) Aston Villa	€8M	Variables for €3M	
1 July 2024	MF	(Italy) Samuele Damiani	26	(Italy) Palermo	N/A	End of loan	
1 July 2024	MF	(Togo) Dikeni Salifou	21	(Germany) Werder Bremen	N/A	End of loan	
2 July 2024	FW	(Portugal) Félix Correia	22	(Portugal) Gil Vicente	€1.5M	Redeem after loan and variables for future sale	
4 July 2024	MF	(Italy) Ferdinando Del Sole	26	(Italy) Pineto	Free	End of contract	
10 July 2024	FW	(Italy) Mirco Lipari	21	(Italy) Lumezzane	Free		
11 July 2024	DF	(Italy) Andrea Bonetti	20	(Italy) Renate	Undisclosed		
12 July 2024	MF	(Italy) Alessandro Sersanti	22	(Italy) Reggiana	N/A	On loan until June 2025 with option to buy	
15 July 2024	MF	(Italy) Mattia Compagnon	22	(Italy) Catanzaro	N/A	On loan until June 2025 with option to buy	
19 July 2024	DF	(Italy) Davide De Marino	23	(Italy) Pro Vercelli	Free		
19 July 2024	DF	(Italy) Umberto Morleo	19	(Italy) Catanzaro	Free		
19 July 2024	DF	(Italy) Andrea Valdesi	20	(Italy) Giugliano	Free	Redeem after loan	
23 July 2024	GK	(Italy) Giovanni Garofani	21	(Italy) Monopoli	N/A	On loan until June 2025	
30 July 2024	DF	(Spain) Dean Huijsen	19	(England) Bournemouth	€15.2M	Variables for €3M and future sale	
30 July 2024	FW	(Argentina) Matías Soulé	21	(Italy) Roma	€25.6M	Variables for €4M	
31 July 2024	DF	(Italy) Riccardo Turicchia	21	(Italy) Catanzaro	N/A	On loan until June 2025	
1 August 2024	FW	(Italy) Leonardo Cerri	21	(Italy) Carrarese	N/A	On loan until June 2025	
6 August 2024	DF	(Italy) Tommaso Barbieri	21	(Italy) Cremonese	€2M	Variables for future sale	
6 August 2024	DF	(Italy) Gianluca Frabotta	25	(England) West Bromwich Albion	Free	Variables for future sale	
7 August 2024	MF	(Italy) Simone Iocolano	34	(Italy) Piacenza	Free	End of contract	
8 August 2024	MF	(France) Marley Aké	23	(Switzerland) Yverdon	Free	Redeem after loan	
9 August 2024	FW	(Italy) Emanuele Pecorino	23	(Italy) Frosinone	N/A	On loan until June 2025 with option to buy	
13 August 2023	MF	(Italy) Nikola Sekulov	21	(Italy) Sampdoria	N/A	On loan until June 2025 with option to buy for €2M	
22 August 2024	DF	(Italy) Alessandro Minelli	25	(Italy) Giugliano	Undisclosed		
28 August 2024	DF	(Bosnia and Herzegovina) Tarik Muharemovic	21	(Italy) Sassuolo	N/A	On loan until June 2025 with option to buy	
28 August 2024	DF	(Italy) Alessandro Pio Riccio	22	(Italy) Sampdoria	Undisclosed		
29 August 2024	DF	(Uruguay) Facundo González	21	(Netherlands) Feyenoord	€0.5M	On loan until June 2025 with option to buy for €6M with variables for future sale	
29 August 2024	DF	(France) Jean-Claude Ntenda	21	(Italy) SPAL	N/A	On loan until June 2025 with option to buy	
30 August 2024	GK	(Italy) Stefano Gori	28	(Italy) Spazio	N/A	On loan until his expiration contract in June 2025	
30 August 2024	MF	(Italy) Luis Hasa	20	(Italy) Lecce	€0.15M	Variables for future sale	
30 August 2023	MF	(Italy) Tommaso Maressa	20	(Italy) Carrarese	Undisclosed		
30 August 2024	FW	(Italy) Marco Olivieri	25	(Italy) Triestina	Undisclosed		
30 August 2024	FW	(Argentina) Juan Ignacio Quattrocchi	20	(Italy) Cavese	N/A	On loan until June 2025	
4 September 2024	FW	(Switzerland) Christopher Lungoyi	22	(Turkey) Gaziantep	€0.1M		

=== Winter 2024–25 ===
==== In ====
Date	Pos.	Player	Age	Moving from	Fee	Notes	Source
15 January 2025	DF	(Portugal) Alberto Costa	21	(Portugal) Vitória de Guimarães	€13.8M		
23 January 2025	FW	(France) Randal Kolo Muani	26	(France) Paris Saint-Germain	€3.6M	On loan until June 2025 and variables for €2.6M	
27 January 2025	DF	(Portugal) Renato Veiga	21	(England) Chelsea	€4M	On loan until June 2025 and variables for €0.2M	
3 February 2025	DF	(England) Lloyd Kelly	26	(England) Newcastle	€3.8M	On loan until June 2025 with option to buy for €17.2M	

==== Out ====
Date	Pos.	Player	Age	Moving to	Fee	Notes	Source
27 January 2025	DF	(Brazil) Danilo	33	(Brazil) Flamengo	Free	Contract terminated	
1 February 2025	MF	(Brazil) Arthur	28	(Spain) Girona	N/A	On loan until June 2025	
4 February 2025	MF	(Italy) Nicolò Fagioli	23	(Italy) Fiorentina	€2.5M	On loan until June 2025 with obligation to buy for €13.5M	

==== Other acquisitions ====
Date	Pos.	Player	Age	Moving from	Fee	Notes	Source
15 January 2025	DF	(Italy) Lorenzo Villa	21	(Italy) Pineto	N/A	On loan to play for Juventus Next Gen with option to buy	
15 January 2025	FW	(Senegal) Serigne Deme	19	(Italy) Sasso Marconi	Undisclosed	To play for Juventus Next Gen	
16 January 2025	DF	(Italy) Riccardo Turicchia	21	(Italy) Catanzaro	N/A	End of loan to play for Juventus Next Gen	
16 January 2025	FW	(Argentina) Juan Ignacio Quattrocchi	20	(Italy) Cavese	N/A	End of loan to play for Juventus Next Gen	
22 January 2025	FW	(Italy) Alessandro Pietrelli	22	(Italy) Feralpisalò	N/A	On loan to play for Juventus Next Gen with option to buy	
3 February 2025	GK	(Italy) Giovanni Garofani	22	(Italy) Monopoli	N/A	End of loan to play for Juventus Next Gen	
4 February 2025	DF	(Brazil) Pedro Felipe	20	(Brazil) Palmeiras	€0.7M	Redeem after loan to play for Juventus Next Gen	

==== Other disposals ====
Date	Pos.	Player	Age	Moving to	Fee	Notes	Source
30 November 2024	MF	(France) Paul Pogba	31		Free	Released	
21 January 2025	MF	(Italy) Nicolò Ledonne	20	(Italy) Giana Erminio	N/A	On loan until June 2025	
21 January 2025	MF	(Norway) Martin Palumbo	22	(Italy) Avellino	Free	On loan until June 2025 with option to buy	
24 January 2025	MF	(Belgium) Joseph Nonge	19	(Switzerland) Servette	N/A	On loan until June 2025 with option to buy after the return from Troyes	
24 January 2025	FW	(Italy) Marco Da Graca	22	(Italy) Novara	N/A	On loan until June 2025	
28 January 2025	GK	(Slovakia) Jakub Vinarčík	19	(Portugal) Arouca	N/A	On loan until June 2025 with option to buy	
1 February 2025	FW	(Italy) Gianmarco Di Biase	19	(Italy) Pergolettese	N/A	On loan until June 2025	

=== June 2025 ===
==== In ====
Date	Pos.	Player	Age	Moving from	Fee	Notes	Source
1 June 2025	DF	(Italy) Daniele Rugani	30	(Netherlands) Ajax	N/A	End of loan	
1 June 2025	MF	(Serbia) Filip Kostić	31	(Turkey) Fenerbahçe	N/A	End of loan	

==== Out ====
Date	Pos.	Player	Age	Moving to	Fee	Notes	Source
1 June 2025	DF	(Portugal) Renato Veiga	21	(England) Chelsea	N/A	End of loan	

==== Other acquisitions ====
Date	Pos.	Player	Age	Moving from	Fee	Notes	Source
5 June 2025	DF	(France) Pierre Kalulu	25	(Italy) Milan	€14.3M	Redeem after loan + variables for €4M	

== Pre-season and friendlies ==
26 July 2024 Friendly	1. FC Nürnberg	3–0	Juventus	Nuremberg, Germany
17:00 CEST (UTC+2)	Jander 19'; Forkel 87'; Janisch 89'	Report	Vlahović (penalty missed) 72'	Stadium: Max-Morlock-Stadion; Attendance: 33,180; Referee: Martin Petersen (Germany)

3 August 2024 Friendly	Juventus	2–2	Brest	Pescara, Italy
21:00 CEST (UTC+2)	Vlahović 58' (pen.); Danilo 71'	Report	Camara 51'; Camblan 83'	Stadium: Stadio Adriatico; Attendance: 22,000; Referee: Rosario Abisso (Italy)

6 August 2024 Friendly	Juventus	4–0	Juventus Next Gen	Turin, Italy
18:30 CEST (UTC+2)	Danilo 26'; Weah 29'; Yıldız 39'; Thuram 43'	Report		Stadium: Juventus Stadium; Attendance: 39,201; Referee: Simone Gauzolino (Italy)
Note: The match was called off in the 56th minute due to the annual tradition of pitch invasion.

11 August 2024 Friendly	Atlético Madrid	2–0	Juventus	Gothenburg, Sweden
15:00 CEST (UTC+2)	Lino (yellow card) 43'; Félix 48'; Serrano (yellow card) 68'; Correa 85' (pen.)	Report		Stadium: Ullevi; Attendance: 13,767; Referee: Mohammed Al-Hakim (Sweden)

== Competitions ==
=== Overview ===
Competition	First match	Last match	Starting round	Final position	Record							
Competition	First match	Last match	Starting round	Final position	Pld	W	D	L	GF	GA	GD	Win %
Serie A	19 August 2024	25 May 2025	Matchday 1	4th	38	18	16	4	58	35	+23	47.37
Coppa Italia	17 December 2024	26 February 2025	Round of 16	Quarter-finals	2	1	1	0	5	1	+4	50.00
Supercoppa Italiana	3 January 2025		Semi-finals	Semi-finals	1	0	0	1	1	2	−1	0.00
UEFA Champions League	17 September 2024	19 February 2025	League phase	Knockout phase play-offs	10	4	3	3	12	11	+1	40.00
FIFA Club World Cup	18 June 2025	1 July 2025	Group stage	Round of 16	4	2	0	2	11	7	+4	50.00
Total					55	25	20	10	87	56	+31	45.45

Source: Soccerway

=== Serie A ===
==== League table ====
Pos	Team	Pld	W	D	L	GF	GA	GD	Pts	Qualification or relegation
2	Inter Milan	38	24	9	5	79	35	+44	81	Qualification for the Champions League league phase
3	Atalanta	38	22	8	8	78	37	+41	74	Qualification for the Champions League league phase
4	Juventus	38	18	16	4	58	35	+23	70	Qualification for the Champions League league phase
5	Roma	38	20	9	9	56	35	+21	69	Qualification for the Europa League league phase
6	Fiorentina	38	19	8	11	60	41	+19	65 (Note: Fiorentina finished ahead of Lazio on head-to-head points: Fiorentina 2–1 Lazio, Lazio 1–2 Fiorentina.)	Qualification for the Conference League play-off round

Source: Serie A
Rules for classification: 1) Points; 2) Tiebreaker for Champions team and third relegated team; 3) Head-to-head points; 4) Head-to-head goal difference; 5) Goal difference; 6) Goals scored; 7) Draw.
(Note: Head-to-head record is used only after all the matches between the teams in question have been played)

==== Results summary ====
Overall								Home						Away					
Pld	W	D	L	GF	GA	GD	Pts	W	D	L	GF	GA	GD	W	D	L	GF	GA	GD
38	18	16	4	58	35	+23	70	11	7	1	31	15	+16	7	9	3	27	20	+7

Source: Serie A

==== Results by round ====
Round	1	2	3	4	5	6	7	8	9	10	11	12	13	14	15	16	17	18	20	19^{1}	21	22	23	24	25	26	27	28	29	30	31	32	33	34	35	36	37	38
Ground	H	A	H	A	H	A	H	H	A	H	A	H	A	A	H	H	A	H	A	A	H	A	H	A	H	A	H	H	A	H	A	H	A	H	A	A	H	A
Result	W	W	D	D	D	W	D	W	D	D	W	W	D	D	D	D	W	D	D	D	W	L	W	W	W	W	W	L	L	W	D	W	L	W	D	D	W	W
Position	3	1	2	4	4	2	3	3	3	6	6	6	6	6	6	6	6	6	5	5	5	5	5	5	4	4	4	4	5	5	5	4	5	4	4	4	4	4

Source: Serie A
A = Away; H = Home; W = Win; D = Draw; L = Loss

^{1} Matchday 19 (vs Atalanta) was postponed due to both clubs' participation in the Supercoppa Italiana.

==== Matches ====
The league fixtures were released on 4 July 2024.

19 August 2024 1	Juventus	3–0	Como	Turin
20:45 CEST (UTC+2)	Mbangula 23'; Weah 45+1'; Locatelli (yellow card) 58'; Cambiaso (yellow card) 88', (goal) 90+1'	Report	Sala (yellow card) 9'; Engelhardt (yellow card) 33'; Verdi (yellow card) 72'; Goldaniga (yellow card) 76'	Stadium: Juventus Stadium; Attendance: 40,696; Referee: Matteo Marcenaro

26 August 2024 2	Hellas Verona	0–3	Juventus	Verona
20:45 CEST (UTC+2)	Tchaouna (yellow card) 52'; Duda (yellow card) 52'	Report	Vlahović 28', 53' (pen.); Savona 39'	Stadium: Stadio Marcantonio Bentegodi; Attendance: 29,575; Referee: Antonio Giua

1 September 2024 3	Juventus	0–0	Roma	Turin
20:45 CEST (UTC+2)	Fagioli (yellow card) 2'; Bremer (yellow card) 85'	Report	Saelemaekers (yellow card) 44'; Mancini (yellow card) 85'	Stadium: Juventus Stadium; Attendance: 41,375; Referee: Marco Guida

14 September 2024 4	Empoli	0–0	Juventus	Empoli
18:00 CEST (UTC+2)	Pellegri (yellow card) 74'	Report	Bremer (yellow card) 62'; Thuram (yellow card) 72'	Stadium: Stadio Carlo Castellani; Attendance: 15,715; Referee: Marco Di Bello

21 September 2024 5	Juventus	0–0	Napoli	Turin
18:00 CEST (UTC+2)	McKennie (yellow card) 33'	Report		Stadium: Juventus Stadium; Attendance: 40,295; Referee: Daniele Doveri

28 September 2024 6	Genoa	0–3	Juventus	Genoa
18:00 CEST (UTC+2)	Frendrup (yellow card) 27'; Vásquez (yellow card) 76'	Report	Vlahović 48' (pen.), 55'; Fagioli (yellow card) 50'; Conceição 89'	Stadium: Stadio Luigi Ferraris; Attendance: 0 (Note: The match was played behind closed doors following violent clashes after Genoa and Sampdoria met in the second round of the 2024–25 Coppa Italia on 25 September 2024.); Referee: Andrea Colombo

6 October 2024 7	Juventus	1–1	Cagliari	Turin
12:30 CEST (UTC+2)	Vlahović 15' (pen.); Thuram (yellow card) 33'; Savona (yellow card) 56'; Conceição (yellow card) 75' (yellow-red card) 89'; Cambiaso (yellow card) 84'	Report	Marin 88' (pen.); Mina (yellow card) 88'; Deiola (yellow card) 90+6'	Stadium: Juventus Stadium; Attendance: 40,557; Referee: Livio Marinelli

19 October 2024 8	Juventus	1–0	Lazio	Turin
20:45 CEST (UTC+2)	Locatelli (yellow card) 45+2'; Savona (yellow card) 50'; Fagioli (yellow card) 60'; Gila 85' (o.g.); Douglas Luiz (yellow card) 90'	Report	Romagnoli (red card) 24'; Vecino (yellow card) 90+4'; Pedro (yellow card) 90+5'	Stadium: Juventus Stadium; Attendance: 40,800; Referee: Juan Luca Sacchi

27 October 2024 9	Internazionale	4–4	Juventus	Milan
18:00 CET (UTC+1)	Zieliński 15' (pen.), 37' (pen.); Mkhitaryan 35'; Dumfries 53', (yellow card) 75'; Pavard (yellow card) 59'	Report	Vlahović 20'; Weah 26'; Danilo (yellow card) 52'; Yıldız 71', 82'	Stadium: San Siro; Attendance: 75,056; Referee: Marco Guida

30 October 2024 10	Juventus	2–2	Parma	Turin
20:45 CET (UTC+1)	McKennie 31'; Vlahović (yellow card) 47'; Weah 49'; Conceição (yellow card) 58'	Report	Del Prato 3'; Sohm 38'	Stadium: Juventus Stadium; Attendance: 40,809; Referee: Luca Zufferli

2 November 2024 11	Udinese	0–2	Juventus	Udine
18:00 CET (UTC+1)	Bijol (yellow card) 47'; Davis (yellow card) 84'	Report	Okoye 19' (o.g.); Savona 37'; Locatelli (yellow card) 58'; Gatti (yellow card) 90+1'	Stadium: Stadio Friuli; Attendance: 24,990; Referee: Rosario Abisso

9 November 2024 12	Juventus	2–0	Torino	Turin
20:45 CET (UTC+1)	Weah 18'; Yıldız 84'; Koopmeiners (yellow card) 90+1'	Report	Lazaro (yellow card) 57'; Walukiewicz (yellow card) 59'; Coco (yellow card) 80'	Stadium: Juventus Stadium; Attendance: 41,066; Referee: Simone Sozza

23 November 2024 13	Milan	0–0	Juventus	Milan
18:00 CET (UTC+1)	Leão (yellow card) 26'; Emerson (yellow card) 67'; Fofana (yellow card) 69'	Report	Gatti (yellow card) 27'; Locatelli (yellow card) 87'	Stadium: San Siro; Attendance: 75,502; Referee: Daniele Chiffi

1 December 2024 14	Lecce	1–1	Juventus	Lecce
20:45 CET (UTC+1)	Coulibaly (yellow card) 19'; Rebić 90+3'	Report	Cambiaso (yellow card) 39', (goal) 68'; Danilo (yellow card) 67'; Fagioli (yellow card) 73'; Koopmeiners (yellow card) 82'	Stadium: Stadio Via del mare Attendance: 27,080; Referee: Antonio Rapuano

7 December 2024 15	Juventus	2–2	Bologna	Turin
18:00 CET (UTC+1)	Weah (yellow card) 18'; Koopmeiners 62'; Kalulu (yellow card) 72'; Vlahović (yellow card) 83'; Mbangula 90+2'	Report	Ndoye 30'; Odgaard (yellow card) 32'; Pobega 52'; Castro (yellow card) 76'; Holm (yellow card) 78'; Lucumí (yellow card) 83'	Stadium: Juventus Stadium; Attendance: 40,748; Referee: Matteo Marchetti

14 December 2024 16	Juventus	2–2	Venezia	Turin
20:45 CET (UTC+1)	Gatti 19'; Vlahović 90+5' (pen.), (yellow card) 90+6'	Report	Zampano (yellow card) 47'; Ellertsson 61'; Idzes 83'; Yeboah (yellow card) 90'; Šverko (yellow card) 90+1'	Stadium: Juventus Stadium; Attendance: 38,425; Referee: Antonio Giua

22 December 2024 17	Monza	1–2	Juventus	Monza
20:45 CET (UTC+1)	Pereira (yellow card) 15'; Birindelli 22'	Report	McKennie 14'; González 39'; Conceição (yellow card) 57'	Stadium: Stadio Brianteo; Attendance: 15,479; Referee: Davide Massa

29 December 2024 18	Juventus	2–2	Fiorentina	Turin
18:00 CET (UTC+1)	Thuram 20', 48'; McKennie (yellow card) 59'; Kalulu (yellow card) 69'; Locatelli (yellow card) 77'	Report	Kean 38'; Comuzzo (yellow card) 85'; Sottil 87'	Stadium: Juventus Stadium; Attendance: 41,188; Referee: Maurizio Mariani

11 January 2025 20	Torino	1–1	Juventus	Turin
18:00 CET (UTC+1)	Vojvoda (yellow card) 26'; Vlašić 45+1'; Coco (yellow card) 48'; Linetty (yellow card) 69'; Walukiewicz (yellow card) 90+5'	Report	Yıldız 8'; Douglas Luiz (yellow card) 62'	Stadium: Stadio Olimpico Grande Torino; Attendance: 27,014; Referee: Michael Fabbri

14 January 2025 19	Atalanta	1–1	Juventus	Bergamo
20:45 CET (UTC+1)	Kolašinac (yellow card) 74'; Retegui 78'	Report	Kalulu 54'; Mbangula (yellow card) 86'	Stadium: Stadio Atleti Azzurri d'Italia; Attendance: 22,920; Referee: Daniele Doveri
Note: The match was originally scheduled for 5 January 2025, but was postponed due to both clubs' participation in the Supercoppa Italiana.

18 January 2025 21	Juventus	2–0	Milan	Turin
18:00 CET (UTC+1)	Mbangula 59'; Weah 64'	Report	Bennacer (yellow card) 61'; Emerson (yellow card) 72'	Stadium: Juventus Stadium; Attendance: 40,784; Referee: Davide Massa

25 January 2025 22	Napoli	2–1	Juventus	Naples
18:00 CET (UTC+1)	Zambo Anguissa 57'; Lukaku 69' (pen.); Lobotka (yellow card) 72'; Spinazzola (yellow card) 90+1'	Report	Kolo Muani 43'; Cambiaso (yellow card) 45'; Koopmeiners (yellow card) 90+5'	Stadium: Stadio Diego Armando Maradona; Attendance: 53,589; Referee: Daniele Chiffi

2 February 2025 23	Juventus	4–1	Empoli	Turin
12:30 CET (UTC+1)	Kolo Muani 61', 64'; Vlahović 90'; Conceição 90+2'	Report	De Sciglio 4'; Gyasi (yellow card) 37'; Maleh (yellow card) 41' (yellow-red card) 84'	Stadium: Juventus Stadium; Attendance: 40,160; Referee: Luca Zufferli

7 February 2025 24	Como	1–2	Juventus	Como
20:45 CET (UTC+1)	Valle (yellow card) 37'; Diao 45+1'; Strefezza (yellow card) 75'; Goldaniga (yellow card) 86'	Report	Savona (yellow card) 28'; Kolo Muani 34', 89' (pen.)	Stadium: Stadio Giuseppe Sinigaglia; Attendance: 10,475; Referee: Rosario Abisso

16 February 2025 25	Juventus	1–0	Internazionale	Turin
20:45 CET (UTC+1)	Conceição (yellow card) 52', (goal) 74'	Report	Barella (yellow card) 90'	Stadium: Juventus Stadium; Attendance: 41,361; Referee: Maurizio Mariani

23 February 2025 26	Cagliari	0–1	Juventus	Cagliari
20:45 CET (UTC+1)		Report	Vlahović 12'; Weah (yellow card) 49'	Stadium: Unipol Domus; Attendance: 16,412; Referee: Andrea Colombo

3 March 2025 27	Juventus	2–0	Hellas Verona	Turin
20:45 CET (UTC+1)	Kelly (yellow card) 63'; Thuram 72'; Koopmeiners 90'	Report		Stadium: Juventus Stadium; Attendance: 36,215; Referee: Matteo Marchetti

9 March 2025 28	Juventus	0–4	Atalanta	Turin
20:45 CET (UTC+1)	Yıldız (yellow card) 44'	Report	Retegui 29' (pen.); Hien (yellow card) 41'; De Roon 46'; Zappacosta 66'; Lookman 77'	Stadium: Juventus Stadium; Attendance: 40,266; Referee: Simone Sozza

16 March 2025 29	Fiorentina	3–0	Juventus	Florence
18:00 CET (UTC+1)	Marí (yellow card) 13'; Gosens 15'; Mandragora 18'; Guðmundsson 53'; Ranieri (yellow card) 73'	Report	Locatelli (yellow card) 46'; Weah (yellow card) 73'; Thuram (yellow card) 82'	Stadium: Stadio Artemio Franchi; Attendance: 22,253; Referee: Michael Fabbri

29 March 2025 30	Juventus	1–0	Genoa	Turin
18:00 CET (UTC+1)	Yıldız 25'; Thuram (yellow card) 31'; Weah (yellow card) 88'	Report	Frendrup (yellow card) 56'; Malinovskyi (yellow card) 72'	Stadium: Juventus Stadium; Attendance: 40,219; Referee: Antonio Rapuano

6 April 2025 31	Roma	1–1	Juventus	Rome
20:45 CEST (UTC+2)	Cristante (yellow card) 26'; Shomurodov 49'	Report	Locatelli 40'; Veiga (yellow card) 65'	Stadium: Stadio Olimpico; Attendance: 65,778; Referee: Andrea Colombo

12 April 2025 32	Juventus	2–1	Lecce	Turin
20:45 CEST (UTC+2)	Koopmeiners 2'; Yıldız 33'	Report	Morente (yellow card) 52'; Baschirotto 87'	Stadium: Juventus Stadium; Attendance: 39,259; Referee: Luca Zufferli

23 April 2025 33	Parma	1–0	Juventus	Parma
18:30 CEST (UTC+2) (Note: The match, originally scheduled for 21 April 2025, was postponed to 23 April 2025 due to the death of Pope Francis.)	Sohm (yellow card) 25'; Pellegrino 45+1'; Hernani (yellow card) 49'	Report	González (yellow card) 53'; Locatelli (yellow card) 69'; Yıldız (yellow card) 76'	Stadium: Stadio Ennio Tardini; Attendance: 21,587; Referee: Daniele Chiffi

27 April 2025 34	Juventus	2–0	Monza	Turin
18:00 CEST (UTC+2)	González 11'; Veiga (yellow card) 32'; Kolo Muani 33'; Yıldız (red card) 45+3'; Savona (yellow card) 59'; Costa (yellow card) 86'	Report	Pereira (yellow card) 75'; Caldirola (yellow card) 79'; Carboni (yellow card) 86'	Stadium: Juventus Stadium; Attendance: 40,016; Referee: Daniele Perenzoni

4 May 2025 35	Bologna	1–1	Juventus	Bologna
20:45 CEST (UTC+2)	Freuler 54'; Castro (yellow card) 90+4'	Report	Thuram 9'; Locatelli (yellow card) 48'; González (yellow card) 74'; Costa (yellow card) 90+2'	Stadium: Stadio Renato Dall'Ara; Attendance: 32,468; Referee: Daniele Doveri

10 May 2025 36	Lazio	1–1	Juventus	Rome
18:00 CEST (UTC+2)	Castellanos (yellow card) 69'; Pellegrini (yellow card) 80'; Guendouzi (yellow card) 90'; Vecino (yellow card) 90', (goal) 90+6'; Zaccagni (yellow card) 90+2'	Report	Thuram (yellow card) 21'; Savona (yellow card) 28'; Kolo Muani 51'; Locatelli (yellow card) 55'; Kalulu (red card) 60'; McKennie (yellow card) 90+3'	Stadium: Stadio Olimpico; Attendance: 60,368; Referee: Davide Massa

18 May 2025 37	Juventus	2–0	Udinese	Turin
20:45 CEST (UTC+2)	González 61'; Vlahović 88'	Report	Kamara (yellow card) 3'; Lovrić (yellow card) 14'; Kristensen (yellow card) 77'	Stadium: Juventus Stadium; Attendance: 40,259; Referee: Giovanni Ayroldi

25 May 2025 38	Venezia	2–3	Juventus	Venice
20:45 CEST (UTC+2)	Fila 2'; Zerbin (yellow card) 53'; Haps 55'	Report	Costa (yellow card) 20'; Yıldız 25'; Kolo Muani 31'; González (yellow card) 62'; Locatelli 73' (pen.)	Stadium: Stadio Pier Luigi Penzo; Attendance: 12,048; Referee: Andrea Colombo

=== Coppa Italia ===
17 December 2024 Round of 16	Juventus	4–0	Cagliari	Turin
21:00 CET (UTC+1)	Vlahović 44'; Koopmeiners 53'; Conceição 80'; González 89'	Report		Stadium: Juventus Stadium; Attendance: 36,768; Referee: Ermanno Feliciani

26 February 2025 Quarter-finals	Juventus	1–1 (2–4 p)	Empoli	Turin
21:00 CET (UTC+1)	Thuram 66'; Locatelli (yellow card) 81'	Report	Maleh 24'; Henderson (yellow card) 65'; Goglichidze (yellow card) 74'; Esposito (yellow card) 79'	Stadium: Juventus Stadium; Attendance: 39,304; Referee: Francesco Fourneau
	Penalties
	Vlahović (penalty missed); Kolo Muani (penalty scored); Locatelli (penalty scored); Yıldız (penalty missed)		(penalty scored) Henderson; (penalty scored) Kouamé; (penalty scored) Cacace; (penalty scored) Marianucci

=== Supercoppa Italiana ===
3 January 2025 Semi-finals	Juventus	1–2	Milan	Riyadh, Saudi Arabia
22:00 SAST (UTC+3)	Yıldız 21'; McKennie (yellow card) 45+1'	Report	Pulisic 71' (pen.), (yellow card) 82'; Gatti 75' (o.g.); Emerson (yellow card) 79'	Stadium: King Saud University Stadium; Attendance: 24,783; Referee: Andrea Colombo

=== UEFA Champions League ===
==== League phase ====
The league phase draw was held on 29 August 2024.

Pos	Team	Pld	W	D	L	GF	GA	GD	Pts	Qualification
18	(French Football Federation) Brest	8	4	1	3	10	11	−1	13	Advance to knockout phase play-offs (unseeded)
19	(Royal Dutch Football Association) Feyenoord	8	4	1	3	18	21	−3	13	Advance to knockout phase play-offs (unseeded)
20	(Italian Football Federation) Juventus	8	3	3	2	9	7	+2	12	Advance to knockout phase play-offs (unseeded)
21	(Scottish Football Association) Celtic	8	3	3	2	13	14	−1	12	Advance to knockout phase play-offs (unseeded)
22	(The Football Association) Manchester City	8	3	2	3	18	14	+4	11	Advance to knockout phase play-offs (unseeded)

Source: UEFA
Rules for classification: League phase tiebreakers

Round	1	2	3	4	5	6	7	8
Ground	H	A	H	A	A	H	A	H
Result	W	W	L	D	D	W	D	L
Position	8	7	14	11	19	14	17	20

Source: UEFA
A = Away; H = Home; W = Win; D = Draw; L = Loss

17 September 2024 1	Juventus (Italy)	3–1	(Netherlands) PSV Eindhoven	Turin, Italy
18:45 CEST (UTC+2)	Yıldız 21'; McKennie 27'; González 52'	Report	Saibari 90+3'	Stadium: Juventus Stadium; Attendance: 40,417; Referee: Alejandro Hernández Hernández (Spain)

2 October 2024 2	RB Leipzig (Germany)	2–3	(Italy) Juventus	Leipzig, Germany
21:00 CEST (UTC+2)	Šeško 30', 65' (pen.); Raum (yellow card) 79'	Report	Vlahović 50', 68'; Di Gregorio (red card) 59'; Conceição 82', (yellow card) 85'; Perin (yellow card) 90+9'	Stadium: Red Bull Arena; Attendance: 45,228; Referee: François Letexier (France)

22 October 2024 3	Juventus (Italy)	0–1	(Germany) VfB Stuttgart	Turin, Italy
21:00 CEST (UTC+2)	Danilo (yellow card) 81' (yellow-red card) 84'	Report	Demirović (yellow card) 51'; Rouault (yellow card) 54'; Millot (penalty missed) 86'; Touré 90+2'	Stadium: Juventus Stadium; Attendance: 41,306; Referee: Espen Eskås (Norway)

5 November 2024 4	Lille (France)	1–1	(Italy) Juventus	Villeneuve-d'Ascq, France
21:00 CET (UTC+1)	David 27'; André (yellow card) 73'	Report	Vlahović 60' (pen.); Cabal (yellow card) 62'	Stadium: Stade Pierre-Mauroy; Attendance: 48,312; Referee: Irfan Peljto (Bosnia and Herzegovina)

27 November 2024 5	Aston Villa (England)	0–0	(Italy) Juventus	Birmingham, England
21:00 CET (UTC+1)	Tielemans (yellow card) 10'; Bailey (yellow card) 12'; Torres (yellow card) 39'	Report	Kalulu (yellow card) 45'; Weah (yellow card) 78'; Koopmeiners (yellow card) 90+3'	Stadium: Villa Park; Attendance: 42,589; Referee: Jesús Gil Manzano (Spain)

11 December 2024 6	Juventus (Italy)	2–0	(England) Manchester City	Turin, Italy
21:00 CET (UTC+1)	Vlahović 53'; McKennie 75'; Di Gregorio (yellow card) 85'	Report	Grealish (yellow card) 84'; Silva (yellow card) 86'	Stadium: Juventus Stadium; Attendance: 40,890; Referee: Clément Turpin (France)

21 January 2025 7	Club Brugge (Belgium)	0–0	(Italy) Juventus	Bruges, Belgium
21:00 CET (UTC+1)		Report	Koopmeiners (yellow card) 38'; Conceição (yellow card) 77'	Stadium: Jan Breydel Stadium; Attendance: 26,700; Referee: Benoît Bastien (France)

29 January 2025 8	Juventus (Italy)	0–2	(Portugal) Benfica	Turin, Italy
21:00 CET (UTC+1)	Vlahović (yellow card) 55'	Report	Pavlidis 16'; Otamendi (yellow card) 63'; Bah (yellow card) 78'; Kökçü 80'	Stadium: Juventus Stadium; Attendance: 41,402; Referee: István Kovács (Romania)

==== Knockout phase ====
===== Knockout phase play-offs =====
The knockout phase play-offs draw was held on 31 January 2025.

11 February 2025 First leg	Juventus (Italy)	2–1	(Netherlands) PSV Eindhoven	Turin, Italy
21:00 CET (UTC+1)	McKennie 34'; Mbangula 82'	Report	Perišić 56'; De Jong (yellow card) 73'	Stadium: Juventus Stadium; Attendance: 39,886; Referee: Daniel Siebert (Germany)

19 February 2025 Second leg	PSV Eindhoven (Netherlands)	3–1 (a.e.t.) (4–3 agg.)	(Italy) Juventus	Eindhoven, Netherlands
21:00 CET (UTC+1)	Schouten (yellow card) 53'; Perišić 53'; Saibari 74'; Flamingo 98'	Report	Weah 63'; Gatti (yellow card) 84'; Savona (yellow card) 94'; Yıldız (yellow card) 100'	Stadium: Philips Stadion; Attendance: 35,000; Referee: Slavko Vinčić (Slovenia)

=== FIFA Club World Cup ===
==== Group stage ====
The group stage draw was held on 5 December 2024.

Pos	Team	Pld	W	D	L	GF	GA	GD	Pts	Qualification
1	(England) Manchester City	3	3	0	0	13	2	+11	9	Advance to knockout stage
2	(Italy) Juventus	3	2	0	1	11	6	+5	6	Advance to knockout stage
3	(United Arab Emirates) Al Ain	3	1	0	2	2	12	−10	3	
4	(Morocco) Wydad AC	3	0	0	3	2	8	−6	0	

Source: FIFA
Rules for classification: Group stage tiebreakers

18 June 2025 1	Al Ain (United Arab Emirates)	0–5	(Italy) Juventus	Washington, D.C., United States
21:00 EDT (UTC−4)	Traoré (yellow card) 90+3'	Report	McKennie (yellow card) 5'; Kolo Muani 11', 45+4'; Cambiaso (yellow card) 16'; Conceição 21', 58', (yellow card) 60'; Yıldız 31'; Gatti (yellow card) 82'	Stadium: Audi Field; Attendance: 18,161; Referee: Tori Penso (United States)

22 June 2025 2	Juventus (Italy)	4–1	(Morocco) Wydad AC	Philadelphia, United States
12:00 EDT (UTC−4)	Boutouil 6' (o.g.); Yıldız 16', 69'; Thuram (yellow card) 77'; Vlahović 90+4' (pen.)	Report	Meijers (yellow card) 22'; Lorch 25'; Ferreira (yellow card) 51'	Stadium: Lincoln Financial Field; Attendance: 31,975; Referee: Saíd Martínez (Honduras)

26 June 2025 3	Juventus (Italy)	2–5	(England) Manchester City	Orlando, United States
15:00 EDT (UTC−4)	Koopmeiners 11'; Kalulu (yellow card) 64'; Vlahović 84'	Report	Doku 9'; Kalulu 26' (o.g.); Haaland 52'; Foden 69'; Savinho 75'	Stadium: Camping World Stadium; Attendance: 54,320; Referee: Clément Turpin (France)

==== Knockout stage ====
1 July 2025 Round of 16	Real Madrid (Spain)	1–0	(Italy) Juventus	Miami Gardens, United States
15:00 EDT (UTC−4)	G. García 54'; Bellingham (yellow card) 87'	Report		Stadium: Hard Rock Stadium; Attendance: 62,149; Referee: Szymon Marciniak (Poland)

== Statistics ==
=== Appearances and goals ===
No.	Pos	Nat	Player	Total		Serie A		Coppa Italia		Supercoppa Italiana		Champions League		Club World Cup	
No.	Pos	Nat	Player	Apps	Goals	Apps	Goals	Apps	Goals	Apps	Goals	Apps	Goals	Apps	Goals
Goalkeepers
1	GK	(Italy) ITA	Mattia Perin	9	0	5	0	1	0	0	0	2+1	0	0	0
23	GK	(Italy) ITA	Carlo Pinsoglio	0	0	0	0	0	0	0	0	0	0	0	0
29	GK	(Italy) ITA	Michele Di Gregorio	47	0	33	0	1	0	1	0	8	0	4	0
Defenders
2	DF	(Portugal) POR	Alberto Costa	14	0	3+6	0	0+1	0	0	0	0	0	4	0
3	DF	(Brazil) BRA	Bremer	8	0	6	0	0	0	0	0	2	0	0	0
4	DF	(Italy) ITA	Federico Gatti	46	1	26+4	1	1+1	0	1	0	8+1	0	0+4	0
6	DF	(England) ENG	Lloyd Kelly	19	0	11+1	0	1	0	0	0	2	0	4	0
15	DF	(France) FRA	Pierre Kalulu	43	1	25+4	1	1	0	1	0	8	0	4	0
24	DF	(Italy) ITA	Daniele Rugani	1	0	0	0	0	0	0	0	0	0	1	0
27	DF	(Italy) ITA	Andrea Cambiaso	46	2	25+8	2	1	0	0+1	0	5+2	0	3+1	0
32	DF	(Colombia) COL	Juan Cabal	9	0	6+1	0	0	0	0	0	2	0	0	0
37	DF	(Italy) ITA	Nicolò Savona	40	2	19+9	2	1	0	1	0	5+2	0	3	0
40	DF	(Sweden) SWE	Jonas Rouhi	6	0	1+4	0	0	0	0	0	0+1	0	0	0
Midfielders
5	MF	(Italy) ITA	Manuel Locatelli	51	2	34+2	2	1+1	0	1	0	7+2	0	2+1	0
8	MF	(Netherlands) NED	Teun Koopmeiners	44	5	23+5	3	2	1	1	0	7+2	0	1+3	1
16	MF	(United States) USA	Weston McKennie	47	5	26+5	2	2	0	1	0	6+3	3	3+1	0
17	MF	(Montenegro) MNE	Vasilije Adžić	9	0	0+6	0	0+1	0	0	0	0+1	0	0+1	0
18	MF	(Serbia) SRB	Filip Kostić	2	0	0	0	0	0	0	0	0	0	1+1	0
19	MF	(France) FRA	Khéphren Thuram	51	5	26+9	4	2	1	1	0	5+4	0	3+1	0
26	MF	(Brazil) BRA	Douglas Luiz	27	0	4+15	0	0	0	0+1	0	3+3	0	0+1	0
Forwards
7	FW	(Portugal) POR	Francisco Conceição	40	7	12+14	3	1+1	1	0	0	6+3	1	3	2
9	FW	(Serbia) SRB	Dušan Vlahović	44	17	21+8	10	2	1	1	0	6+3	4	1+2	2
10	FW	(Turkey) TUR	Kenan Yıldız	52	12	28+7	7	1+1	0	1	1	8+2	1	3+1	3
11	FW	(Argentina) ARG	Nicolás González	38	5	23+3	3	1+1	1	0+1	0	5+1	1	1+2	0
14	FW	(Poland) POL	Arkadiusz Milik	0	0	0	0	0	0	0	0	0	0	0	0
20	FW	(France) FRA	Randal Kolo Muani	22	10	13+3	8	1	0	0	0	2	0	3	2
22	FW	(United States) USA	Timothy Weah	43	6	18+12	5	1+1	0	0+1	0	5+4	1	0+1	0
36	FW	(Italy) ITA	Lorenzo Anghelè	1	0	0+1	0	0	0	0	0	0	0	0	0
44	FW	(Italy) ITA	Diego Pugno	1	0	0+1	0	0	0	0	0	0	0	0	0
51	FW	(Belgium) BEL	Samuel Mbangula	32	4	7+16	3	1	0	1	0	2+5	1	0	0
Players transferred during the season
6	DF	(Brazil) BRA	Danilo	16	0	6+6	0	0	0	0	0	2+2	0	0	0
12	DF	(Portugal) POR	Renato Veiga	15	0	12+1	0	0	0	0	0	2	0	0	0
18	MF	(Brazil) BRA	Arthur	0	0	0	0	0	0	0	0	0	0	0	0
21	MF	(Italy) ITA	Nicolò Fagioli	22	0	5+12	0	0	0	0+1	0	2+2	0	0	0

Source: Competitions

=== Goalscorers ===
Rank	No.	Pos.	Player	Serie A	Coppa Italia	Supercoppa Italiana	Champions League	Club World Cup	Total
1	9	FW	(Serbia) Dušan Vlahović	10	1	0	4	2	17
2	10	FW	(Turkey) Kenan Yıldız	7	0	1	1	3	12
3	20	FW	(France) Randal Kolo Muani	8	0	0	0	2	10
4	7	FW	(Portugal) Francisco Conceição	3	1	0	1	2	7
5	22	FW	(United States) Timothy Weah	5	0	0	1	0	6
6	8	MF	(Netherlands) Teun Koopmeiners	3	1	0	0	1	5
6	11	FW	(Argentina) Nicolás González	3	1	0	1	0	5
6	16	MF	(United States) Weston McKennie	2	0	0	3	0	5
6	19	MF	(France) Khéphren Thuram	4	1	0	0	0	5
10	51	FW	(Belgium) Samuel Mbangula	3	0	0	1	0	4
11	5	MF	(Italy) Manuel Locatelli	2	0	0	0	0	2
11	27	DF	(Italy) Andrea Cambiaso	2	0	0	0	0	2
11	37	DF	(Italy) Nicolò Savona	2	0	0	0	0	2
14	4	DF	(Italy) Federico Gatti	1	0	0	0	0	1
14	15	DF	(France) Pierre Kalulu	1	0	0	0	0	1
Own goals				2	0	0	0	1	3
Totals				58	5	1	12	11	87

Source: Competitions
