= Khéphren Thuram =

French footballer (born 2001)

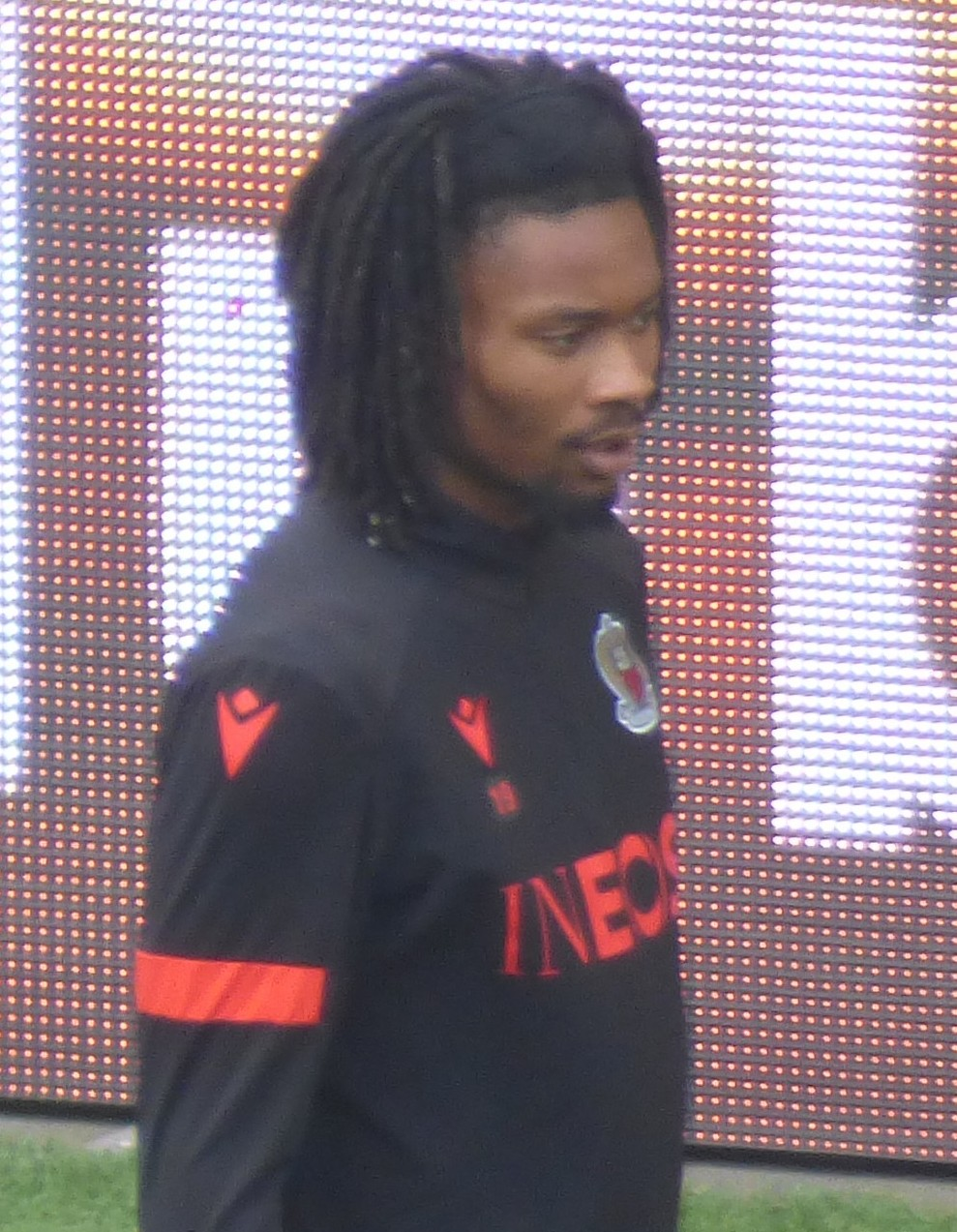
- Thuram with Nice in 2022

Personal information
- Full name: Khéphren Thuram-Ulien
- Date of birth: 26 March 2001 (age 25)
- Place of birth: Reggio Emilia, Italy
- Height: 1.93 m (6 ft 4 in)
- Position: Central midfielder

Team information
- Current team: Juventus
- Number: 19

Youth career
- 2007–2013: Olympique de Neuilly
- 2013–2016: Boulogne-Billancourt
- 2016–2018: Monaco

Senior career*
| Years | Team | Apps | (Gls) |
| 2018–2019 | Monaco B | 14 | (1) |
| 2018–2019 | Monaco | 0 | (0) |
| 2019–2020 | Nice B | 4 | (0) |
| 2019–2024 | Nice | 141 | (9) |
| 2024– | Juventus | 70 | (7) |

International career^{‡}
| 2016–2017 | France U16 | 12 | (1) |
| 2017–2018 | France U17 | 6 | (0) |
| 2018–2019 | France U18 | 8 | (0) |
| 2019 | France U19 | 7 | (1) |
| 2021–2023 | France U21 | 18 | (2) |
| 2024 | France Olympic | 2 | (0) |
| 2023– | France | 4 | (0) |
- * Club domestic league appearances and goals as of 23:10, 24 May 2026 (UTC) ‡ National team caps and goals as of 23:34, 16 November 2025 (UTC)

Khéphren Thuram-Ulien (French pronunciation: [kefʁɛn tyʁam]; born 26 March 2001) is a French professional footballer who plays as a midfielder for Serie A club Juventus and the France national team.

Formed at Monaco, where he made three substitute appearances, Thuram signed for rivals Nice in 2019. He made 167 appearances for Nice, including the 2022 Coupe de France final, before joining Juventus in 2024. Formerly a youth international, he made his senior international debut for France in 2023.

== Club career ==
=== Monaco ===
Thuram made his professional debut with Monaco in a 2–0 UEFA Champions League loss away to Atlético Madrid on 28 November 2018, at the age of 17; he was a 63rd-minute substitute for Aleksandr Golovin.

=== Nice ===
On 26 June 2019, Thuram joined Derby de la Côte d'Azur rivals Nice at the expiration of his Monaco contract on 1 July. His Nice contract was his first professional deal. He made his debut on 17 August in a 2–1 win at Nîmes, replacing Ignatius Ganago for the last seven minutes. On 3 October 2020, he scored his first professional goal to win a home match by the same score against Nantes.

In September 2021, Thuram extended his contract that was due to expire in July 2022, by an undisclosed length. On 7 May, he played in the 2022 Coupe de France final, which his team lost by a single goal to Nantes. He scored four goals and assisted three in the 2021–22 Ligue 1 as Nice came fifth and qualified for the UEFA Europa Conference League; he was then linked with following manager Christophe Galtier to Paris Saint-Germain.

Thuram was selected for the Team of the Season in 2022–23, the only player from outside the top three clubs to make the list. One of his two goals that season came in a 3–0 derby win at his former club Monaco.

=== Juventus ===
On 10 July 2024, Thuram signed for Serie A club Juventus on a five-year deal worth €20 million. In December 2024, he became the third Thuram family member to score in Serie A, by netting a brace in a 2–2 draw against Fiorentina.

== International career ==
Thuram has represented France at various youth international levels.

In March 2023, he received his first call-up to the France senior national team for the UEFA Euro 2024 qualifying matches against the Netherlands and the Republic of Ireland. He made his international debut, coming off the bench in the 89th minute to substitute Adrien Rabiot, in a 4–0 victory over the Netherlands. Later that year, in November, he was recalled to the national team, following an injury to Eduardo Camavinga during the same Euro 2024 qualifying.

Manager Thierry Henry chose Thuram for the football event at the 2024 Summer Olympics on home soil. He was, however, not permitted to take part by his new club Juventus.

== Personal life ==
Thuram is the son of the former France international footballer Lilian Thuram, and the younger brother of Inter and France forward Marcus Thuram. He was named after the Egyptian pharaoh Khephren, hence nicknamed Le Pharaon.

Born in Reggio Emilia while his father Lilian played for Parma, Thuram is of Guadeloupean descent through his father.

== Career statistics ==
=== Club ===
As of match played 24 May 2026

Appearances and goals by club, season and competition
| Club | Season | League | | | National cup (Note: Includes Coupe de France, Coppa Italia) | | Europe | | Other | | Total | |
| Club | Season | Division | Apps | Goals | Apps | Goals | Apps | Goals | Apps | Goals | Apps | Goals |
|---|---|---|---|---|---|---|---|---|---|---|---|---|
| Monaco B | 2018–19 | National 2 | 14 | 1 | — | | — | | — | | 14 | 1 |
| Monaco | 2018–19 | Ligue 1 | 0 | 0 | 0 | 0 | 2 (Note: Appearances in UEFA Champions League) | 0 | 1 (Note: Appearance in Coupe de la Ligue) | 0 | 3 | 0 |
| Nice B | 2019–20 | National 3 | 4 | 0 | — | | — | | — | | 4 | 0 |
| Nice | 2019–20 | Ligue 1 | 14 | 0 | 2 | 0 | — | | — | | 16 | 0 |
| Nice | 2020–21 | Ligue 1 | 29 | 2 | 1 | 0 | 3 (Note: Appearances in UEFA Europa League) | 0 | — | | 33 | 2 |
| Nice | 2021–22 | Ligue 1 | 36 | 4 | 5 | 0 | — | | — | | 41 | 4 |
| Nice | 2022–23 | Ligue 1 | 35 | 2 | 1 | 0 | 12 (Note: Appearances in UEFA Europa Conference League) | 0 | — | | 48 | 2 |
| Nice | 2023–24 | Ligue 1 | 27 | 1 | 2 | 0 | — | | — | | 29 | 1 |
| Nice | Total | | 141 | 9 | 11 | 0 | 15 | 0 | — | | 167 | 9 |
| Juventus | 2024–25 | Serie A | 35 | 4 | 2 | 1 | 9 | 0 | 5 (Note: One appearance in Supercoppa Italiana, four appearances in FIFA Club World Cup) | 0 | 51 | 5 |
| Juventus | 2025–26 | Serie A | 35 | 3 | 1 | 0 | 9 | 1 | — | | 45 | 4 |
| Juventus | Total | | 70 | 7 | 3 | 1 | 18 | 1 | 5 | 0 | 96 | 9 |
| Career total | | | 229 | 17 | 14 | 1 | 35 | 1 | 6 | 0 | 284 | 19 |

=== International ===
As of match played 16 November 2025

Appearances and goals by national team and year
| National team | Year | Apps | Goals |
|---|---|---|---|
| France | 2023 | 1 | 0 |
| France | 2024 | 0 | 0 |
| France | 2025 | 3 | 0 |
| Total | | 4 | 0 |

== Honours ==
Nice

- Coupe de France runner-up: 2021–22

Individual

- UNFP Ligue 1 Team of the Year: 2022–23
- Serie A Player of the Month: May 2025
- Serie A Team of the Season: 2024–25
