= 2025–26 Juventus FC season =

Italian football club season

Juventus
2025–26 season
- Chairman: Gianluca Ferrero
- Head coach: Igor Tudor (until 27 October); Massimo Brambilla (interim, from 27 to 30 October); Luciano Spalletti (from 30 October)
- Stadium: Juventus Stadium
- Serie A: 6th
- Coppa Italia: Quarter-finals
- UEFA Champions League: Knockout phase play-offs
- Top goalscorer: League: Kenan Yıldız (10); All: Kenan Yıldız (11)
- Highest home attendance: 41,676 vs Fiorentina (17 May 2026, Serie A)
- Lowest home attendance: 34,674 vs Udinese (2 December 2025, Coppa Italia)
- Average home league attendance: 40,725
- Biggest win: Juventus 5–0 Cremonese
- Biggest defeat: Atalanta 3–0 Juventus; Galatasaray 5–2 Juventus
Home colours	Away colours	Third colours

The 2025–26 season was Juventus Football Club's 128th season in existence and their 19th consecutive season in the top flight of Italian football. In addition to the domestic league, Juventus participated in the Coppa Italia and the UEFA Champions League.

== Players ==
=== Squad information ===
Players, appearances, goals and squad numbers last updated on 24 May 2026. Appearances and goals include all official competition matches.
Note: Flags indicate national team as has been defined under FIFA eligibility rules. Players may hold more than one non-FIFA nationality.

No.	Player	Nat.	Position(s)	Date of birth (age)	Signed in	Contract ends	Signed from	Transfer fee	Apps.	Goals
Goalkeepers
1	Mattia Perin	(Italy)	GK	10 November 1992 (age 34)	2018	2027	(Italy) Genoa	€12M	69	0
16	Michele Di Gregorio	(Italy)	GK	27 July 1997 (age 29)	2024	2029	(Italy) Monza	€14.3M	84	0
23	Carlo Pinsoglio	(Italy)	GK	16 March 1990 (age 36)	2014	2027	(Italy) Vicenza	€0.7M	6	0
Defenders
2	Emil Holm	(Sweden)	RB	13 May 2000 (age 26)	2026	2026	(Italy) Bologna	Loan	8	0
3	Bremer	(Brazil)	CB	18 March 1997 (age 29)	2022	2029	(Italy) Torino	€41M	122	12
4	Federico Gatti	(Italy)	CB	24 June 1998 (age 28)	2022	2030	(Italy) Frosinone	€5.4M	137	11
6	Lloyd Kelly	(England)	CB / LB	6 October 1998 (age 28)	2025	2029	(England) Newcastle	€17.2M	65	2
15	Pierre Kalulu	(France)	CB / RB	5 June 2000 (age 26)	2024	2029	(Italy) Milan	€14.3M	92	3
32	Juan Cabal	(Colombia)	CB / LB	8 January 2001 (age 25)	2024	2029	(Italy) Hellas Verona	€12.8M	28	2
Midfielders
5	Manuel Locatelli (c)	(Italy)	CM / DM	8 January 1998 (age 28)	2021	2028	(Italy) Sassuolo	€30M	230	9
8	Teun Koopmeiners	(Netherlands)	CM / DM / AM	28 February 1998 (age 28)	2024	2029	(Italy) Atalanta	€54.7M	88	7
17	Vasilije Adžić	(Montenegro)	CM / AM	12 May 2006 (age 20)	2024	2029	(Montenegro) Budućnost	€2M	26	1
18	Filip Kostić	(Serbia)	LWB / LW	1 November 1992 (age 34)	2022	2026	(Germany) Eintracht Frankfurt	€12M	112	6
19	Khéphren Thuram	(France)	CM	26 March 2001 (age 25)	2024	2029	(France) Nice	€20M	96	9
21	Fabio Miretti	(Italy)	CM / AM	3 August 2003 (age 23)	2021	2028	(Italy) Youth Sector	N/A	88	1
22	Weston McKennie	(United States)	CM / RB / RWB	28 August 1998 (age 28)	2020	2030	(Germany) Schalke 04	€22M	230	27
27	Andrea Cambiaso	(Italy)	RB / RWB / LB / LWB	20 February 2000 (age 26)	2022	2029	(Italy) Genoa	€8.8M	131	8
Forwards
7	Francisco Conceição	(Portugal)	RW / LW	14 December 2002 (age 23)	2024	2030	(Portugal) Porto	€32M	82	11
9	Dušan Vlahović	(Serbia)	ST	28 January 2000 (age 26)	2022	2026	(Italy) Fiorentina	€70M	168	68
10	Kenan Yıldız	(Turkey)	AM	4 May 2005 (age 21)	2023	2030	(Italy) Youth Sector	N/A	131	27
11	Edon Zhegrova	(Kosovo)	RW / LW	31 March 1999 (age 27)	2025	2030	(France) Lille	€15.5M	27	0
13	Jérémie Boga	(Ivory Coast)	LW / AM	3 January 1997 (age 29)	2026	2026	(France) Nice	Loan	17	4
14	Arkadiusz Milik	(Poland)	ST	28 February 1994 (age 32)	2022	2027	(France) Marseille	€6.3M	77	17
20	Loïs Openda	(Belgium)	ST	14 January 2000 (age 26)	2025	2026	(Germany) RB Leipzig	€3.3M (loan)	34	2
30	Jonathan David	(Canada)	ST	16 February 2000 (age 26)	2025	2030	(France) Lille	Free	46	7
Players transferred during the season
11	Nicolás González	(Argentina)	AM / RW / LW	6 April 1998 (age 28)	2024	2029	(Italy) Fiorentina	€28.1M	40	5
24	Daniele Rugani	(Italy)	CB	29 July 1994 (age 32)	2015	2028	(Italy) Empoli	€3.5M	157	11
25	João Mário	(Portugal)	RB / RWB	3 January 2000 (age 26)	2025	2030	(Portugal) Porto	€11.4M	13	0
40	Jonas Rouhi	(Sweden)	LB / LWB	7 January 2004 (age 22)	2023	2028	(Italy) Youth Sector	N/A	6	0

== Transfers ==
=== Summer 2025 ===
==== In ====
Date	Pos.	Player	Age	Moving from	Fee	Notes	Source
1 July 2025	MF	(Italy) Fabio Miretti	21	(Italy) Genoa	—N/a	End of loan	
4 July 2025	FW	(Canada) Jonathan David	25	(France) Lille	Free	End of contract	
24 July 2025	DF	(Portugal) João Mário	23	(Portugal) Porto	€11.4M	Variables for €1.2M	
1 September 2025	FW	(Belgium) Loïs Openda	25	(Germany) RB Leipzig	€3.3M	On loan until June 2026 with option to buy for €42.3M and variables for €0.8M	
1 September 2025	FW	(Kosovo) Edon Zhegrova	26	(France) Lille	€15.5M	Variables for €3M	

==== Out ====
Date	Pos.	Player	Age	Moving to	Fee	Notes	Source
15 July 2025	FW	(France) Randal Kolo Muani	26	(France) Paris Saint-Germain	—N/a	End of loan	
23 July 2025	FW	(Belgium) Samuel Mbangula	21	(Germany) Werder Bremen	€10M	Variables for €2M	
24 July 2025	DF	(Portugal) Alberto Costa	21	(Portugal) Porto	€15M	Variables for €1M	
6 August 2025	FW	(United States) Timothy Weah	25	(France) Marseille	€1M	On loan with obligation to buy for €14.4M plus variables for €4.1M and for future sale	
21 August 2025	MF	(Brazil) Douglas Luiz	27	(England) Nottingham Forest	€3M	On loan with option to buy for €25M plus variables for €3.5M	
29 August 2025	DF	(Italy) Nicolò Savona	22	(England) Nottingham Forest	€13M	Variables for €2.5M and for future sale	
1 September 2025	MF	(Argentina) Nico González	27	(Spain) Atlético Madrid	€1M plus variables for €1M	On loan with obligation to buy for €32M	

==== Other acquisitions ====
Date	Pos.	Player	Age	Moving from	Fee	Notes	Source
1 July 2025	GK	(Italy) Michele Di Gregorio	27	(Italy) Monza	€14.3M	Reedem after loan and variables for €2M	
1 July 2025	DF	(England) Lloyd Kelly	26	(England) Newcastle United	€17.2M	Reedem after loan and variables for €6.5M	
1 July 2025	DF	(Belgium) Grady Makiobo	18	(Belgium) Club Brugge	Free	To play for Juventus Next Gen	
1 July 2025	DF	(Italy) Brando Moruzzi	20	(Italy) Pescara	€0.3M	Buy-back clause	
1 July 2025	DF	(Netherlands) Shane van Aarle	19	(Netherlands) FC Eindhoven	€0.2M	To play for Juventus Next Gen	
1 July 2025	DF	(Italy) Lorenzo Villa	21	(Italy) Pineto	€0.3M	Redeem after loan to play for Juventus Next Gen	
1 July 2025	FW	(Argentina) Nicolás González	27	(Italy) Fiorentina	€28.1M	Reedem after loan and variables for €5M	
1 July 2025	FW	(Italy) Alessandro Pietrelli	22	(Italy) Feralpisalò	€1.7M	Reedem after loan to play for Juventus Next Gen	
15 July 2025	DF	(Italy) Mattia Brugarello	19	(Italy) Teramo	Free	To play for Juventus Next Gen	
16 July 2025	GK	(Italy) Stefano Mangiapoco	21	(Italy) Giana Erminio	€0.2M	To play for Juventus Next Gen	
22 July 2025	FW	(Portugal) Francisco Conceição	22	(Portugal) Porto	€32M	Redeem after loan	
31 July 2025	MF	(Italy) Giacomo Faticanti	21	(Italy) Lecce	—N/a	Renowal of loan until June 2026 to play for Juventus Next Gen with option to buy	
16 August 2025	FW	(Italy) Alvin Okoro	20	(Italy) Venezia	€0.25M	On loan until June 2026 to play for Juventus Next Gen wit option to buy for €2.5M	

==== Other disposals ====
Date	Pos.	Player	Age	Moving to	Fee	Notes	Source
1 July 2025	GK	(Slovakia) Jakub Vinarčík	19	(Portugal) Arouca	€0.2M	Redeem after loan	
1 July 2025	DF	(Bosnia and Herzegovina) Tarik Muharemovic	22	(Italy) Sassuolo	€3M	Redeem after loan	
1 July 2025	DF	(Italy) Luca Pellegrini	26	(Italy) Lazio	€4M	Redeem after loan	
1 July 2025	DF	(Italy) Riccardo Stivanello	21	(Italy) Bologna	—N/a	End of loan	
1 July 2025	MF	(Italy) Nicolò Fagioli	24	(Italy) Fiorentina	€13.5M	Redeem after loan and variables for €2.5M	
1 July 2025	MF	(Italy) Hans Nicolussi Caviglia	24	(Italy) Venezia	€3.5M	Redeem after loan	
1 July 2025	MF	(Norway) Martin Palumbo	23	(Italy) Avellino	€1M	Redeem after loan	
1 July 2025	MF	(Greece) Christos Papadopoulos	20	(Italy) Genoa	—N/a	End of loan	
1 July 2025	MF	(Italy) Nicolò Rovella	23	(Italy) Lazio	€17M	Redeem after loan	
1 July 2025	MF	(Italy) Nikola Sekulov	23	(Italy) Sampdoria	€1.55M	Redeem after loan	
1 July 2025	FW	(Ghana) Felix Afena-Gyan	22	(Italy) Cremonese	—N/a	End of loan	
1 July 2025	FW	(Portugal) Luís Semedo	21	(England) Sunderland	—N/a	End of loan	
7 July 2025	FW	(Romania) Lorenzo Biliboc	18	(Romania) CFR Cluj			
8 July 2025	MF	(Belgium) Joseph Nonge	20	(Turkey) Kocaelispor	Free	Variables for future sale	
9 July 2025	MF	(Italy) Nicolò Ledonne	21	(Italy) Novara	Free	Variables for future sale	
11 July 2025	DF	(Italy) Lorenzo Villa	21	(Italy) Padova	—N/a	On loan until June 2026 with option to buy	
11 July 2025	FW	(Italy) Emanuele Pecorino	23	(Italy) Südtirol	—N/a	On loan until June 2026 with option to buy	
12 July 2025	MF	(Italy) Mattia Compagnon	23	(Italy) Venezia	—N/a	On loan until June 2026 with option to buy for €1M	
16 July 2025	GK	(Italy) Giovanni Daffara	20	(Italy) Avellino	€0.3M	On loan until June 2026 with buying at the end of the season	
17 July 2025	DF	(Italy) Fabrizio Poli	36	(Italy) Altamura	Free	Released	
23 July 2025	GK	(Poland) Radosław Żelezny	18	(Italy) Roma	Free	Released	
26 July 2025	DF	(Italy) Brando Moruzzi	21	(Italy) Empoli	—N/a	On loan until June 2026 wit option to buy	
28 July 2025	GK	(Italy) Giovanni Garofani	22	(Italy) Carrarese	Free	Variables for future sale	
28 July 2025	DF	(Italy) Alessandro Citi	22	(Italy) Novara	Free	Released	
6 August 2025	DF	(Curaçao) Livano Comenencia	21	(Switzerland) Zurich	€0.4M	Variables for future sale and buy back clause	
14 August 2025	FW	(Italy) Alessandro Pietrelli	22	(Italy) Venezia	—N/a	On loan until June 2026 with option to buy for €3.5M	
16 August 2025	FW	(Italy) Tommaso Mancini	21	(Italy) Virtus Verona	—N/a	On loan until June 2026	
22 August 2025	MF	(Italy) Alessandro Sersanti	23	(Italy) Modena	—N/a	On loan until June 2026 with option to buy and variables for future sale	
26 August 2025	MF	(Brazil) Arthur	29	(Brazil) Gremio	—N/a	On loan until June 2026	
26 August 2025	FW	(Italy) Gianmarco Di Biase	19	(Italy) Bra	—N/a	On loan until June 2026	
27 August 2025	DF	(Portugal) Tiago Djaló	25	(Turkey) Beşiktaş	€3.5M	Variables for €1M	
27 August 2024	FW	(Italy) Leonardo Cerri	21	(Italy) Bari	—N/a	On loan until June 2026 with option to buy	
1 September 2025	DF	(Uruguay) Facundo González	21	(Spain) Racing Santander	—N/a	On loan until June 2026 with option to buy	
1 September 2025	MF	(Argentina) Francisco Baridó	17	(Italy) Napoli	—N/a		
1 September 2025	FW	(Argentina) Juan Ignacio Quattrocchi	21	(Spain) Tudelano	—N/a	On loan until June 2026	
1 September 2025	FW	(Croatia) Ivano Srdoč	19	(Bosnia and Herzegovina) Široki Brijeg	—N/a	On loan until June 2026	

=== Winter 2025–26 ===
==== In ====
Date	Pos.	Player	Age	Moving from	Fee	Notes	Source
1 February 2026	FW	(Ivory Coast) Jérémie Boga	29	(France) Nice	N/A	On loan until June 2026 with option to buy for €4.8M	
2 February 2026	DF	(Sweden) Emil Holm	25	(Italy) Bologna	N/A	On loan until June 2026 with option to buy for €15M plus variables for €3M	

==== Out ====
Date	Pos.	Player	Age	Moving to	Fee	Notes	Source
30 January 2026	DF	(Sweden) Jonas Rouhi	22	(Italy) Carrarese	N/A	On loan until June 2026	
2 February 2026	DF	(Italy) Daniele Rugani	31	(Italy) Fiorentina	€0.5M	On loan until with option to buy for €2M	
2 February 2026	MF	(Portugal) João Mário	26	(Italy) Bologna	N/A	On loan until June 2026	

==== Other acquisitions ====
Date	Pos.	Player	Age	Moving from	Fee	Notes	Source
23 January 2026	MF	(Turkey) Teoman Gündüz	21	(Italy) Triestina	€0.1M	Variables for future sale, to play for Juventus Next Gen	
30 January 2026	FW	(Italy) Leonardo Cerri	22	(Italy) Bari	—N/a	End of loan, to play for Juventus Next Gen	
1 February 2026	DF	(Italy) Gabriele Mulazzi	22	(Switzerland) Sion	—N/a	On loan until June 2026 to play for Juventus Next Gen	
2 February 2026	MF	(Germany) Adin Ličina	19	(Germany) Bayern Munich	Free	Variables for future sale, to play for Juventus Next Gen	
2 February 2026	FW	(England) Justin Oboavwoduo	19	(England) Manchester City	Free	To play for Juventus Next Gen	

==== Other disposals ====
Date	Pos.	Player	Age	Moving to	Fee	Notes	Source
8 January 2026	FW	(Argentina) Juan Ignacio Quattrocchi	21	(Argentina) Argentino de Quilmes	—N/a	On loan until June 2026 after the return from CD Tudelano	
13 January 2026	DF	(Italy) Riccardo Turicchia	22	(Italy) Virtus Entella	Free	Variables on future sale	
16 January 2026	MF	(Italy) Valdes Ngana	19	(Switzerland) FC Rapperswil-Jona	N/A	On loan until June 2026	
22 January 2026	MF	(Italy) Francesco Crapisto	19	(Spain) UB Conquense	N/A	On loan until June 2026	
23 January 2026	FW	(Italy) Alessio Vacca	20	(Italy) Dolomiti Bellunesi	—N/a	On loan until June 2026	
28 January 2026	MF	(Brazil) Douglas Luiz	27	(England) Aston Villa	€2M	On loan with option to buy for €25M plus variables for €3.5M after the return from Nottingham Forest	
29 January 2026	MF	(Italy) Clemente Perotti	23	(Italy) Pro Vercelli	N/A	On loan until June 2026	
2 February 2026	DF	(Brazil) Pedro Felipe	21	(Italy) Sassuolo	N/A	On loan until June 2026 with option to buy	
2 February 2026	FW	(Italy) Alvin Okoro	20	(Italy) Venezia	N/A	End of loan	

== Pre-season and friendlies ==
2 August 2025 Friendly	Juventus	2–2	Reggiana	Turin, Italy
11:00 CEST (UTC+2)	Conceição 23'; Vlahović 47'	Report	Girma 22'; Gondo 72'	Stadium: Juventus Training Center; Attendance: 0 (Note: The match was played behind closed doors.); Referee: Gianluca Manganiello (Italy)

10 August 2025 Friendly	Borussia Dortmund	1–2	Juventus	Dortmund, Germany
17:30 CEST (UTC+2)	Groß (yellow card) 33'; Beier 89'	Report	João Mário (yellow card) 4'; Conceição (yellow card) 13'; Cambiaso 16', 53'	Stadium: Westfalenstadion; Attendance: 81,365; Referee: Timo Gansloweit (Germany)

13 August 2025 Friendly	Juventus	2–0	Juventus Next Gen	Turin, Italy
18:30 CEST (UTC+2)	Douglas Luiz 15'; Vlahović 33'	Report		Stadium: Juventus Stadium; Attendance: 28,102; Referee: Simone Gauzolino (Italy)
Note: The match was called off at the 52nd minute due to the annual tradition of pitch invasion.

16 August 2025 Friendly	Atalanta	1–2	Juventus	Bergamo, Italy
20:45 CEST (UTC+2)	De Roon (yellow card) 35'; Samardžić 90'	Report	David 73'; Vlahović 79'	Stadium: Stadio Atleti Azzurri d'Italia; Attendance: 20,763; Referee: Giuseppe Collu (Italy)

== Competitions ==
=== Overview ===
Competition	First match	Last match	Starting round	Final position	Record							
Competition	First match	Last match	Starting round	Final position	Pld	W	D	L	GF	GA	GD	Win %
Serie A	24 August 2025	24 May 2026	Matchday 1	6th	38	19	12	7	61	34	+27	50.00
Coppa Italia	2 December 2025	5 February 2026	Round of 16	Quarter-finals	2	1	0	1	2	3	−1	50.00
UEFA Champions League	16 September 2025	25 February 2026	League phase	Knockout phase play-offs	10	4	4	2	19	17	+2	40.00
Total					50	24	16	10	82	54	+28	48.00

Source: Soccerway

=== Serie A ===
==== League table ====
Pos	Team	Pld	W	D	L	GF	GA	GD	Pts	Qualification or relegation
4	Como	38	20	11	7	65	29	+36	71	Qualification for the UEFA Champions League league phase
5	AC Milan	38	20	10	8	53	35	+18	70	Qualification for the UEFA Europa League league phase (Note: Since the 2025–26 Coppa Italia winners, Inter Milan, qualified for the Champions League via league position, the Europa League spot awarded to the cup winners was passed to the sixth-placed team, and the Conference League spot was moved down one league position.)
6	Juventus	38	19	12	7	61	34	+27	69	Qualification for the UEFA Europa League league phase
7	Atalanta	38	15	14	9	51	36	+15	59	Qualification for the UEFA Conference League play-off round
8	Bologna	38	16	8	14	49	46	+3	56	

Source: Serie A
Rules for classification: 1) Points; 2) Tiebreaker for Champions team and third relegated team; 3) Head-to-head points; 4) Head-to-head goal difference; 5) Goal difference; 6) Goals scored; 7) Draw.
(Note: Head-to-head record is used only after all the matches between the teams in question have been played)

==== Results summary ====
Overall								Home						Away					
Pld	W	D	L	GF	GA	GD	Pts	W	D	L	GF	GA	GD	W	D	L	GF	GA	GD
38	19	12	7	61	34	+27	69	10	7	2	35	16	+19	9	5	5	26	18	+8

Source: Serie A

==== Results by round ====
Round	1	2	3	4	5	6	7	8	9	10	11	12	13	14	15	16	17	18	19	20	21	22	23	24	25	26	27	28	29	30	31	32	33	34	35	36	37	38
Ground	H	A	H	A	H	H	A	A	H	A	H	A	H	A	A	H	A	H	A	H	A	H	A	H	A	H	A	H	A	H	H	A	H	A	H	A	H	A
Result	W	W	W	D	D	D	L	L	W	W	D	D	W	L	W	W	W	D	W	W	L	W	W	D	L	L	D	W	W	D	W	W	W	D	D	W	L	D
Position	3	1	2	2	4	5	7	8	7	6	6	7	7	7	5	5	5	4	4	4	5	5	4	4	5	5	6	6	5	5	5	4	4	4	4	3	6	6

Source: Serie A
A = Away; H = Home; W = Win; D = Draw; L = Loss

==== Matches ====
The league fixtures were released on 6 June 2025.

24 August 2025 1	Juventus	2–0	Parma	Turin
20:45 CEST (UTC+2)	Gatti (yellow card) 14'; David 59'; Cambiaso (red card) 83'; Vlahović 84'	Report	Suzuki (yellow card) 56'; Sørensen (yellow card) 70'	Stadium: Juventus Stadium; Attendance: 41,251; Referee: Matteo Marcenaro

31 August 2025 2	Genoa	0–1	Juventus	Genoa
18:30 CEST (UTC+2)	Østigård (yellow card) 67'	Report	João Mário (yellow card) 19'; Vlahović 73'; Koopmeiners (yellow card) 82'	Stadium: Stadio Luigi Ferraris; Attendance: 33,522; Referee: Daniele Chiffi

13 September 2025 3	Juventus	4–3	Internazionale	Turin
18:00 CEST (UTC+2)	Kelly 14'; Koopmeiners (yellow card) 33'; Yıldız 38'; Locatelli (yellow card) 70'; K. Thuram 83'; Adžić 90+1'	Report	Çalhanoğlu 30', 65'; M. Thuram 76'; Mkhitaryan (yellow card) 86'	Stadium: Juventus Stadium; Attendance: 41,664; Referee: Andrea Colombo

20 September 2025 4	Hellas Verona	1–1	Juventus	Verona
18:00 CEST (UTC+2)	Akpa Akpro (yellow card) 7'; Orban 44' (pen.), (yellow card) 45'; Bernède (yellow card) 76'	Report	Gatti (yellow card) 9'; Conceição 19'; Kelly (yellow card) 39'; Koopmeiners (yellow card) 65'	Stadium: Stadio Marcantonio Bentegodi; Attendance: 27,783; Referee: Antonio Rapuano

27 September 2025 5	Juventus	1–1	Atalanta	Turin
18:00 CEST (UTC+2)	Cabal 78'	Report	De Roon (yellow card) 32' (yellow-red card) 80'; Sulemana 45'; Zappacosta (yellow card) 87'	Stadium: Juventus Stadium; Attendance: 40,893; Referee: Simone Sozza

5 October 2025 6	Juventus	0–0	Milan	Turin
20:45 CEST (UTC+2)	Locatelli (yellow card) 49'; Gatti (yellow card) 74'	Report	Fofana (yellow card) 45'; Pulisic (penalty missed) 53'; Bartesaghi (yellow card) 59'	Stadium: Juventus Stadium; Attendance: 41,328; Referee: Marco Guida

19 October 2025 7	Como	2–0	Juventus	Como
12:30 CEST (UTC+2)	Kempf 4'; Moreno (yellow card) 12'; Smolčić (yellow card) 22'; Diego Carlos (yellow card) 34'; Paz 79'	Report	Kelly (yellow card) 10'	Stadium: Stadio Giuseppe Sinigaglia; Attendance: 12,067; Referee: Giovanni Ayroldi

26 October 2025 8	Lazio	1–0	Juventus	Rome
20:45 CET (UTC+1)	Bašić 9'; Lazzari (yellow card) 33'; Guendouzi (yellow card) 90+1'	Report	Koopmeiners (yellow card) 30'; Locatelli (yellow card) 52'; McKennie (yellow card) 54'; Kelly (yellow card) 64'	Stadium: Stadio Olimpico; Attendance: 56,771; Referee: Andrea Colombo

29 October 2025 9	Juventus	3–1	Udinese	Turin
18:30 CET (UTC+1)	Vlahović 5' (pen.); Gatti 67'; Di Gregorio (yellow card) 90'; Yıldız 90+6' (pen.)	Report	Goglichidze (yellow card) 3'; Zaniolo 45+1'; Piotrowski (yellow card) 45+3'; Lovrić (yellow card) 79'; Miller (yellow card) 82'	Stadium: Juventus Stadium; Attendance: 40,080; Referee: Marco Di Bello

1 November 2025 10	Cremonese	1–2	Juventus	Cremona
20:45 CET (UTC+1)	Bianchetti (yellow card) 74'; Vardy 83'	Report	Kostić 2'; Cambiaso 68'	Stadium: Stadio Giovanni Zini; Attendance: 14,868; Referee: Daniele Chiffi

8 November 2025 11	Juventus	0–0	Torino	Turin
18:00 CET (UTC+1)		Report	Asllani (yellow card) 66'	Stadium: Juventus Stadium; Attendance: 41,366; Referee: Luca Zufferli

22 November 2025 12	Fiorentina	1–1	Juventus	Florence
18:00 CET (UTC+1)	Fagioli (yellow card) 7'; Mandragora 48', (yellow card) 84'; Parisi (yellow card) 87'	Report	McKennie (yellow card) 42'; Kostić 45+6'; Cabal (yellow card) 84'; Miretti (yellow card) 90+3'	Stadium: Stadio Artemio Franchi; Attendance: 22,346; Referee: Daniele Doveri

29 November 2025 13	Juventus	2–1	Cagliari	Turin
18:00 CET (UTC+1)	Yıldız 27', 45+1'; Cambiaso (yellow card) 83'	Report	Esposito 26'; Obert (yellow card) 39'; Folorunsho (yellow card) 63'; Felici (yellow card) 81'; Prati (yellow card) 82'; Deiola (yellow card) 90+3'	Stadium: Juventus Stadium; Attendance: 39,282; Referee: Valerio Crezzini

7 December 2025 14	Napoli	2–1	Juventus	Naples
20:45 CET (UTC+1)	Højlund 7', 78'; Buongiorno (yellow card) 33'; Beukema (yellow card) 70'	Report	Kalulu (yellow card) 52'; Yıldız 59'	Stadium: Stadio Diego Armando Maradona; Attendance: 53,950; Referee: Federico La Penna

14 December 2025 15	Bologna	0–1	Juventus	Bologna
20:45 CET (UTC+1)	Miranda (yellow card) 24'; Heggem (red card) 69'; Sulemana (yellow card) 90'; De Silvestri (yellow card) 90+4'	Report	Koopmeiners (yellow card) 19'; Cabal 64'	Stadium: Stadio Renato Dall'Ara; Attendance: 32,911; Referee: Davide Massa

20 December 2025 16	Juventus	2–1	Roma	Turin
20:45 CET (UTC+1)	Conceição (yellow card) 24', (goal) 44'; Openda 70'; McKennie (yellow card) 87'	Report	Soulé (yellow card) 21'; Koné (yellow card) 65'; Baldanzi 75'; Cristante (yellow card) 84'	Stadium: Juventus Stadium; Attendance: 41,602; Referee: Simone Sozza

27 December 2025 17	Pisa	0–2	Juventus	Pisa
20:45 CET (UTC+1)	Angori (yellow card) 6'; Vural (yellow card) 52'; Caracciolo (yellow card) 76'; Tramoni (yellow card) 86'	Report	Locatelli (yellow card) 53'; Kalulu 73'; Yıldız 90+2'	Stadium: Stadio Romeo Anconetani; Attendance: 12,640; Referee: Fabio Maresca

3 January 2026 18	Juventus	1–1	Lecce	Turin
18:00 CET (UTC+1)	McKennie 49'; David (penalty missed) 66'	Report	Banda 45+2'; Maleh (yellow card) 61'; Veiga (yellow card) 70'; Falcone (yellow card) 90+5'	Stadium: Juventus Stadium; Attendance: 40,639; Referee: Giuseppe Collu

6 January 2026 19	Sassuolo	0–3	Juventus	Reggio Emilia
20:45 CET (UTC+1)		Report	Muharemović 16' (o.g.); Miretti 62'; David 63'	Stadium: Mapei Stadium – Città del Tricolore; Attendance: 19,488; Referee: Luca Zufferli

12 January 2026 20	Juventus	5–0	Cremonese	Turin
20:45 CET (UTC+1)	Bremer 12'; David 15'; Yıldız (penalty missed) 35', 35'; Terracciano 48' (o.g.); McKennie 64'	Report	Pezzella (yellow card) 68'	Stadium: Juventus Stadium; Attendance: 39,585; Referee: Ermanno Feliciani

17 January 2026 21	Cagliari	1–0	Juventus	Cagliari
20:45 CET (UTC+1)	Mazzitelli 65'	Report	Yıldız (yellow card) 31'	Stadium: Unipol Domus; Attendance: 16,412; Referee: Davide Massa

25 January 2026 22	Juventus	3–0	Napoli	Turin
18:00 CET (UTC+1)	David 22'; Yıldız (yellow card) 57', (goal) 77'; Kostić 86'	Report	Juan Jesus (yellow card) 34'; Vergara (yellow card) 73'	Stadium: Juventus Stadium; Attendance: 41,654; Referee: Maurizio Mariani

1 February 2026 23	Parma	1–4	Juventus	Parma
20:45 CET (UTC+1)	Cambiaso 51' (o.g.); Circati (yellow card) 86'	Report	Bremer 15', 54', (yellow card) 24'; Conceição (yellow card) 17'; McKennie (yellow card) 26', (goal) 37'; David 64'	Stadium: Stadio Ennio Tardini; Attendance: 22,017; Referee: Francesco Fourneau

8 February 2026 24	Juventus	2–2	Lazio	Turin
20:45 CET (UTC+1)	McKennie 59'; Kalulu 90+6'	Report	Taylor (yellow card) 33'; Pedro 45+2'; Isaksen 47'; Romagnoli (yellow card) 81'	Stadium: Juventus Stadium; Attendance: 41,405; Referee: Marco Guida

14 February 2026 25	Internazionale	3–2	Juventus	Milan
20:45 CET (UTC+1)	Bastoni (yellow card) 9'; Cambiaso 17' (o.g.); Barella (yellow card) 53'; Esposito 76'; Çalhanoğlu (yellow card) 79'; Zieliński 90', (yellow card) 90+2'	Report	Cambiaso 26'; Kalulu (yellow card) 32' (yellow-red card) 42'; Locatelli 83'	Stadium: San Siro; Attendance: 75,515; Referee: Federico La Penna

21 February 2026 26	Juventus	0–2	Como	Turin
15:00 CET (UTC+1)	Locatelli (yellow card) 73'	Report	Vojvoda 11'; Caqueret 61'	Stadium: Juventus Stadium; Attendance: 40,822; Referee: Daniele Doveri

1 March 2026 27	Roma	3–3	Juventus	Rome
20:45 CET (UTC+1)	Wesley (yellow card) 27', (goal) 39'; Ndicka 54'; Malen 65'	Report	Conceição 47'; Boga 78'; Gatti 90+3'	Stadium: Stadio Olimpico; Attendance: 65,870; Referee: Simone Sozza

7 March 2026 28	Juventus	4–0	Pisa	Turin
20:45 CET (UTC+1)	Cambiaso 54'; Thuram 65'; Bremer (yellow card) 72'; Yıldız 75'; Boga 90+3'	Report	Marin (yellow card) 40'; Leris (yellow card) 48'; Caracciolo (yellow card) 70'	Stadium: Juventus Stadium; Attendance: 39,172; Referee: Juan Luca Sacchi

14 March 2026 29	Udinese	0–1	Juventus	Udine
20:45 CET (UTC+1)	Zaniolo (yellow card) 32'; Mlačić (yellow card) 88'; Kabasele (yellow card) 90+3'	Report	Boga 38'; Kelly (yellow card) 90'	Stadium: Stadio Friuli; Attendance: 25,022; Referee: Maurizio Mariani

21 March 2026 30	Juventus	1–1	Sassuolo	Turin
20:45 CET (UTC+1)	Yıldız 14'; Bremer (yellow card) 64'; Locatelli (penalty missed) 87'	Report	Pinamonti 52'; Garcia (yellow card) 74'; Lipani (yellow card) 90+5'	Stadium: Juventus Stadium; Attendance: 39,699; Referee: Matteo Marchetti

6 April 2026 31	Juventus	2–0	Genoa	Turin
18:00 CEST (UTC+2)	Bremer 4', (yellow card) 72'; Locatelli (yellow card) 15'; McKennie 17', (yellow card) 27'; Thuram (yellow card) 78'	Report	Frendrup (yellow card) 51'; Martín (penalty missed) 75'	Stadium: Juventus Stadium; Attendance: 40,585; Referee: Davide Massa

11 April 2026 32	Atalanta	0–1	Juventus	Bergamo
20:45 CEST (UTC+2)	De Ketelaere (yellow card) 66'	Report	Boga 48'; Thuram (yellow card) 69'; Cambiaso (yellow card) 73'; Kostić (yellow card) 84'	Stadium: Stadio Atleti Azzurri d'Italia; Attendance: 23,271; Referee: Fabio Maresca

19 April 2026 33	Juventus	2–0	Bologna	Turin
20:45 CEST (UTC+2)	David 2'; Thuram 57'; Locatelli (yellow card) 60'	Report		Stadium: Juventus Stadium; Attendance: 40,516; Referee: Maurizio Mariani

26 April 2026 34	Milan	0–0	Juventus	Milan
20:45 CEST (UTC+2)	Bartesaghi (yellow card) 38'; Estupiñán (yellow card) 75'	Report	Cambiaso (yellow card) 21'; Boga (yellow card) 72'; Locatelli (yellow card) 86'	Stadium: San Siro; Attendance: 75,681; Referee: Simone Sozza

3 May 2026 35	Juventus	1–1	Hellas Verona	Turin
18:00 CEST (UTC+2)	Locatelli (yellow card) 33'; Vlahović 62'	Report	Gagliardini (yellow card) 5'; Frese (yellow card) 31'; Bowie 34'; Bernede (yellow card) 63'; Harroui (yellow card) 90+5'	Stadium: Juventus Stadium; Attendance: 40,557; Referee: Giovanni Ayroldi

9 May 2026 36	Lecce	0–1	Juventus	Lecce
20:45 CEST (UTC+2)	Jean (yellow card) 82'	Report	Vlahović 1'; Conceição (yellow card) 80'	Stadium: Stadio Via del mare Attendance: 27,383; Referee: Andrea Colombo

17 May 2026 37	Juventus	0–2	Fiorentina	Turin
12:00 CEST (UTC+2) (Note: The match, originally scheduled for 12:30 CEST (UTC+2), was pushed up to 12:00 CEST (UTC+2).)	Bremer (yellow card) 44'	Report	Pongračić (yellow card) 22'; Ndour 34'; Ranieri (red card) 73'; Mandragora 83'; Harrison (yellow card) 85'; Guðmundsson (yellow card) 90+1'	Stadium: Juventus Stadium; Attendance: 41,676; Referee: Davide Massa
Note: Ranieri received a red card after being substituted from the match.

24 May 2026 38	Torino	2–2	Juventus	Turin
21:45 CEST (UTC+2) (Note: The match, originally scheduled for 20:45 CEST (UTC+2), was delayed to 21:45 CEST (UTC+2) due to clashes between fans.)	Casadei 60'; Adams 84'; Ebosse (yellow card) 88'	Report	Vlahović 24', 54'; Kalulu (yellow card) 64'; Zhegrova (yellow card) 88'	Stadium: Stadio Olimpico Grande Torino; Attendance: 25,000; Referee: Luca Zufferli

=== Coppa Italia ===
2 December 2025 Round of 16	Juventus	2–0	Udinese	Turin
21:00 CET (UTC+1)	Palma 23' (o.g.); Locatelli 68' (pen.)	Report	Palma (yellow card) 68'	Stadium: Juventus Stadium; Attendance: 34,674; Referee: Francesco Fourneau

5 February 2026 Quarter-finals	Atalanta	3–0	Juventus	Bergamo
21:00 CET (UTC+1)	Scamacca 27' (pen.); Sulemana 77'; Pašalić 85'	Report		Stadium: Stadio Atleti Azzurri d'Italia; Attendance: 22,623; Referee: Michael Fabbri

=== UEFA Champions League ===
==== League phase ====
The league phase draw was held on 28 August 2025.

Pos	Team	Pld	W	D	L	GF	GA	GD	Pts	Qualification
11	(French Football Federation) Paris Saint-Germain	8	4	2	2	21	11	+10	14	Advance to knockout phase play-offs (seeded)
12	(The Football Association) Newcastle United	8	4	2	2	17	7	+10	14	Advance to knockout phase play-offs (seeded)
13	(Italian Football Federation) Juventus	8	3	4	1	14	10	+4	13	Advance to knockout phase play-offs (seeded)
14	(Royal Spanish Football Federation) Atlético Madrid	8	4	1	3	17	15	+2	13	Advance to knockout phase play-offs (seeded)
15	(Italian Football Federation) Atalanta	8	4	1	3	10	10	0	13	Advance to knockout phase play-offs (seeded)

Source: UEFA
Rules for classification: League phase tiebreakers

Round	1	2	3	4	5	6	7	8
Ground	H	A	A	H	A	H	H	A
Result	D	D	L	D	W	W	W	D
Position	16	23	25	26	22	17	15	13

Source: UEFA
A = Away; H = Home; W = Win; D = Draw; L = Loss

16 September 2025 1	Juventus (Italy)	4–4	(Germany) Borussia Dortmund	Turin, Italy
21:00 CEST (UTC+2)	Yıldız 63'; Vlahović 67', 90+4'; Kelly 90+6'	Report	Anton (yellow card) 42'; Adeyemi 52'; Nmecha 65'; Couto 74'; Bensebaini 86' (pen.)	Stadium: Juventus Stadium; Attendance: 41,497; Referee: François Letexier (France)

1 October 2025 2	Villarreal (Spain)	2–2	(Italy) Juventus	Villarreal, Spain
21:00 CEST (UTC+2)	Mikautadze 18'; Akhomach (yellow card) 85'; Veiga 90'	Report	Cabal (yellow card) 6'; Gatti 49'; Conceição 56', (yellow card) 90+5'; Cambiaso (yellow card) 77'	Stadium: Estadio de la Cerámica; Attendance: 20,087; Referee: István Kovács (Romania)

22 October 2025 3	Real Madrid (Spain)	1–0	(Italy) Juventus	Madrid, Spain
21:00 CEST (UTC+2)	Bellingham 57'; Brahim (yellow card) 61'	Report		Stadium: Santiago Bernabéu; Attendance: 76,521; Referee: Slavko Vinčić (Slovenia)

4 November 2025 4	Juventus (Italy)	1–1	(Portugal) Sporting CP	Turin, Italy
21:00 CET (UTC+1)	Thuram (yellow card) 24'; Cambiaso (yellow card) 27'; Vlahović 34'	Report	Araújo 12', (yellow card) 61'; Gonçalves (yellow card) 33'; Hjulmand (yellow card) 73'	Stadium: Juventus Stadium; Attendance: 40,729; Referee: Daniel Siebert (Germany)

25 November 2025 5	Bodø/Glimt (Norway)	2–3	(Italy) Juventus	Bodø, Norway
21:00 CET (UTC+1)	Blomberg 27'; Fet 87' (pen.)	Report	Kelly (yellow card) 39'; Openda 48'; Miretti (yellow card) 50'; McKennie 59'; Cabal (yellow card) 84'; David 90+1'; McKennie (yellow card) 90+4'	Stadium: Aspmyra Stadion; Attendance: 7,824; Referee: Danny Makkelie (Netherlands)

10 December 2025 6	Juventus (Italy)	2–0	(Cyprus) Pafos	Turin, Italy
21:00 CET (UTC+1)	Locatelli (yellow card) 55'; McKennie 67'; David 73'	Report	Šunjić (yellow card) 45'	Stadium: Juventus Stadium; Attendance: 40,336; Referee: Jesús Gil Manzano (Spain)

21 January 2026 7	Juventus (Italy)	2–0	(Portugal) Benfica	Turin, Italy
21:00 CET (UTC+1)	Locatelli (yellow card) 49'; Thuram 55'; McKennie 64'; Kelly (yellow card) 89'	Report	Pavlidis (penalty missed) 81'	Stadium: Juventus Stadium; Attendance: 41,626; Referee: Serdar Gözübüyük (Netherlands)

28 January 2026 8	Monaco (France)	0–0	(Italy) Juventus	Monaco
21:00 CET (UTC+1)	Kehrer (yellow card) 63'; Camara (yellow card) 71'	Report	Yıldız (yellow card) 77'; Adžić (yellow card) 85'	Stadium: Stade Louis II; Attendance: 10,287; Referee: José María Sánchez Martínez (Spain)

==== Knockout phase ====
===== Knockout phase play-offs =====
The knockout phase play-off draw was held on 30 January 2026.

17 February 2026 First leg	Galatasaray (Turkey)	5–2	(Italy) Juventus	Istanbul, Turkey
20:45 TRT (UTC+3)	Sara 15'; Bardakcı (yellow card) 43'; Lang 49', 75'; Sánchez 60'; Boey 86'	Report	Koopmeiners 16', 32'; Cambiaso (yellow card) 18'; Cabal (yellow card) 59' (yellow-red card) 67'	Stadium: Rams Park; Attendance: 49,977; Referee: Danny Makkelie (Netherlands)

25 February 2026 Second leg	Juventus (Italy)	3–2 (a.e.t.) (5–7 agg.)	(Turkey) Galatasaray	Turin, Italy
21:00 CET (UTC+1)	Kelly (yellow card) 25', (red card) 48'; Yıldız (yellow card) 31'; Locatelli 37' (pen.); Pinsoglio (yellow card) 41'; Gatti 70'; McKennie 82'	Report	Osimhen (yellow card) 14', (goal) 105+1'; Sallai (yellow card) 33'; Sara (yellow card) 60'; Çakır (yellow card) 111'; Yılmaz 119'	Stadium: Juventus Stadium; Attendance: 41,421; Referee: João Pinheiro (Portugal)

== Statistics ==
=== Appearances and goals ===
No.	Pos	Nat	Player	Total		Serie A		Coppa Italia		Champions League	
No.	Pos	Nat	Player	Apps	Goals	Apps	Goals	Apps	Goals	Apps	Goals
Goalkeepers
1	GK	(Italy) ITA	Mattia Perin	14	0	9	0	1	0	4	0
16	GK	(Italy) ITA	Michele Di Gregorio	37	0	29+1	0	1	0	6	0
23	GK	(Italy) ITA	Carlo Pinsoglio	0	0	0	0	0	0	0	0
Defenders
2	DF	(Sweden) SWE	Emil Holm	8	0	2+5	0	0+1	0	0	0
3	DF	(Brazil) BRA	Bremer	31	4	25+1	4	1	0	4	0
4	DF	(Italy) ITA	Federico Gatti	28	4	12+9	2	2	0	4+1	2
6	DF	(England) ENG	Lloyd Kelly	46	2	33+2	1	2	0	9	1
15	DF	(France) FRA	Pierre Kalulu	50	2	37+1	2	2	0	10	0
32	DF	(Colombia) COL	Juan Cabal	19	2	2+10	2	1	0	2+4	0
Midfielders
5	MF	(Italy) ITA	Manuel Locatelli	47	3	36	1	1+1	1	7+2	1
8	MF	(Netherlands) NED	Teun Koopmeiners	45	2	18+15	0	1+1	0	9+1	2
17	MF	(Montenegro) MNE	Vasilije Adžić	17	1	1+9	1	0	0	1+6	0
18	MF	(Serbia) SRB	Filip Kostić	23	3	4+14	3	0	0	0+5	0
19	MF	(France) FRA	Khéphren Thuram	45	4	30+5	3	1	0	7+2	1
21	MF	(Italy) ITA	Fabio Miretti	31	1	5+18	1	1	0	4+3	0
22	MF	(United States) USA	Weston McKennie	48	9	32+4	5	2	0	10	4
27	MF	(Italy) ITA	Andrea Cambiaso	47	3	35+1	3	2	0	8+1	0
Forwards
7	FW	(Portugal) POR	Francisco Conceição	42	4	27+4	3	1+1	0	5+4	1
9	FW	(Serbia) SRB	Dušan Vlahović	23	10	11+8	7	0	0	2+2	3
10	FW	(Turkey) TUR	Kenan Yıldız	47	11	33+3	10	1	0	8+2	1
11	FW	(Kosovo) KOS	Edon Zhegrova	26	0	0+18	0	0+2	0	1+5	0
13	FW	(Ivory Coast) CIV	Jérémie Boga	17	4	6+9	4	0+1	0	0+1	0
14	FW	(Poland) POL	Arkadiusz Milik	2	0	0+2	0	0	0	0	0
20	FW	(Belgium) BEL	Loïs Openda	33	2	6+17	1	0+2	0	3+5	1
30	FW	(Canada) CAN	Jonathan David	46	8	20+15	6	2	0	5+4	2
Players transferred during the season
11	FW	(Argentina) ARG	Nicolás González	2	0	0+2	0	0	0	0	0
24	DF	(Italy) ITA	Daniele Rugani	8	0	3+3	0	0	0	1+1	0
25	MF	(Portugal) POR	João Mário	13	0	2+8	0	0+1	0	0+2	0
40	DF	(Sweden) SWE	Jonas Rouhi	0	0	0	0	0	0	0	0

Source: Competitions

=== Goalscorers ===
Rank	No.	Pos.	Player	Serie A	Coppa Italia	Champions League	Total
1	10	FW	(Turkey) Kenan Yıldız	10	0	1	11
2	9	FW	(Serbia) Dušan Vlahović	7	0	3	10
3	22	MF	(United States) Weston McKennie	5	0	4	9
4	30	FW	(Canada) Jonathan David	6	0	2	8
5	3	DF	(Brazil) Bremer	4	0	0	4
5	4	DF	(Italy) Federico Gatti	2	0	2	4
5	7	FW	(Portugal) Francisco Conceição	3	0	1	4
5	13	FW	(Ivory Coast) Jérémie Boga	4	0	0	4
5	19	MF	(France) Khéphren Thuram	3	0	1	4
10	5	MF	(Italy) Manuel Locatelli	1	1	1	3
10	18	MF	(Serbia) Filip Kostić	3	0	0	3
10	27	MF	(Italy) Andrea Cambiaso	3	0	0	3
13	6	DF	(England) Lloyd Kelly	1	0	1	2
13	15	DF	(France) Pierre Kalulu	2	0	0	2
13	18	MF	(Netherlands) Teun Koopmeiners	0	0	2	2
13	20	FW	(Belgium) Loïs Openda	1	0	1	2
13	32	DF	(Colombia) Juan Cabal	2	0	0	2
18	17	MF	(Montenegro) Vasilije Adžić	1	0	0	1
18	21	MF	(Italy) Fabio Miretti	1	0	0	1
Own goals				2	1	0	3
Totals				61	2	19	82

Source: Competitions
