= 2023–24 Juventus Next Gen season =

Juventus Next Gen
2023–24 season
- Chairman: Gianluca Ferrero
- Manager: Massimo Brambilla
- Stadium: Stadio Giuseppe Moccagatta
- Serie C Group B: 7th
- Promotion play-offs: National phase second round
- Coppa Italia Serie C: Round of 16
- Top goalscorer: League: Simone Guerra (17); All: Simone Guerra (18)
- Biggest win: Pro Vercelli 1–5 Juventus Next Gen
- Biggest defeat: Pescara 3–1 Juventus Next Gen
Home colours	Away colours
- All statistics correct as of 7 January 2024.

The 2023–24 season was Juventus Next Gen's sixth season in existence and sixth consecutive season in the Serie C. They were also competing in the Coppa Italia Serie C.

== Players ==
=== First-team squad ===
As of 13 January 2024

Note: Flags indicate national team as defined under FIFA eligibility rules; some limited exceptions apply. Players may hold more than one non-FIFA nationality.

No.	Pos.	Nation	Player
1	GK	ITA	Giovanni Garofani
2	DF	ITA	Nicolò Savona
3	DF	ITA	Diego Stramaccioni
5	DF	BIH	Tarik Muharemović
6	MF	ITA	Tommaso Maressa
7	MF	ITA	Luis Hasa
8	MF	BEL	Joseph Nonge
9	FW	ITA	Leonardo Cerri
10	FW	TUR	Kenan Yıldız (from First Team)
11	FW	BEL	Samuel Mbangula
13	DF	ITA	Fabrizio Poli
14	DF	ITA	Gabriele Mulazzi
15	MF	NED	Livano Comenencia
17	FW	ITA	Simone Guerra
18	DF	FRA	Jean-Claude Ntenda

No.	Pos.	Nation	Player
19	DF	SWE	Jonas Rouhi
20	MF	ITA	Simone Iocolano
21	MF	NOR	Martin Palumbo
23	FW	ITA	Tommaso Mancini
25	GK	ITA	Simone Scaglia
26	MF	ITA	Samuele Damiani (on loan from Palermo)
27	DF	ITA	Andrea Valdesi
29	MF	TOG	Dikeni Salifou (on loan from Werder Bremen)
30	GK	ITA	Giovanni Daffara
31	DF	ITA	Riccardo Stivanello (on loan from Bologna)
32	DF	ITA	Riccardo Turicchia
33	MF	ITA	Clemente Perotti
44	MF	ITA	Nikola Sekulov
45	GK	ITA	Gian Marco Crespi
—	FW	ITA	Marco Da Graca

== Transfers ==
=== In ===
Pos.	Player	Transferred from	Fee	Date	Source
FW	(Italy) Simone Guerra	(Italy) Feralpisalò	€100,000	21 August 2023	
DF	(Italy) Riccardo Stivanello	(Italy) Bologna	Loan	29 August 2023	
DF	(Netherlands) Livano Comenencia	(Netherlands) Jong PSV	€3,000,000	1 September 2023	
MF	(Togo) Dikeni Salifou	(Germany) Werder Bremen	Loan	1 September 2023	
MF	(Italy) Samuele Damiani	(Italy) Palermo	Loan	1 September 2023	
FW	(Italy) Marco Da Graca	(Spain) Amorebieta	Loan return	11 January 2024	
MF	(Italy) Nikola Sekulov	(Italy) Cremonese	Loan return	12 January 2024	
MF	(Italy) Andrea Bonetti	(Italy) Taranto	Loan return	19 January 2024	
DF	(Brazil) Pedro Felipe	(Brazil) Palmeiras U20	Loan	31 January 2024	
DF	(Italy) Diego Stramaccioni	(Italy) Reggiana	Loan	1 February 2024	

=== Out ===
Pos.	Player	Transferred to	Fee	Date	Source
MF	(Italy) Nikola Sekulov	(Italy) Cremonese	Loan	15 July 2023	
FW	(Switzerland) Christopher Lungoyi	(Switzerland) Yverdon-Sport	Loan	11 August 2023	
FW	(Italy) Marco Olivieri	(Italy) Venezia	Loan	18 August 2023	
MF	(Portugal) Félix Correia	(Portugal) Gil Vicente	Loan	22 August 2023	
DF	(Switzerland) Daniel Leo	(Italy) Crotone	Undisclosed	28 August 2023	
FW	(Italy) Marco Da Graca	(Spain) Amorebieta	Loan	30 August 2023	
FW	(Italy) Mirco Lipari	(Italy) Recanatese	Loan	1 September 2023	
DF	(Italy) Giulio Doratiotto	(United States) Phoenix Rising	Free	11 January 2024	
DF	(Italy) Alessandro Citi	(Italy) Pro Vercelli	Loan	12 January 2024	

== Pre-season and friendlies ==
Win Draw Loss Fixtures

29 July 2023 Friendly	Cagliari (Italy)	3–0	(Italy) Juventus Next Gen	Châtillon
19:00 UTC+2	Luvumbo 71', 82', 90'			Stadium: Campo Sportivo E. Brunod; Referee: Matteo Gualtieri

9 August 2023 Friendly	Juventus (Italy)	8–0	(Italy) Juventus Next Gen	Turin
18:30 UTC+2	Vlahović 16' (pen.), 32'; Kean 38'; Jorge 50', 69', 78'; Milik 72'; Huijsen 82'	Report		Stadium: Allianz Stadium; Attendance: 24,000; Referee: Eugenio Scarpa

13 August 2023 Friendly	Pro Vercelli (Italy)	2–7	(Italy) Juventus Next Gen	Vercelli
17:00 UTC+2	Mustacchio 14'; Emmanuello 17'; Iezzi (yellow card) 36'; Comi (red card) 78'	Report	Cerri 3'; Muharemović 24'; Mbangula 33', 51'; Mulazzi (yellow card) 53'; Yıldız 40', 61'; Da Graca 90+1'	Stadium: Stadio Silvio Piola; Referee: Federico Bray

26 August 2023 Friendly	Alessandria (Italy)	0–1	(Italy) Juventus Next Gen	Alessandria
17:00 UTC+2		Report	Turicchia 26'	Stadium: Stadio Giuseppe Moccagatta; Referee: Gabriele Restaldo

== Competitions ==
=== Overall record ===
Competition	First match	Last match	Starting round	Final position	Record							
Competition	First match	Last match	Starting round	Final position	Pld	W	D	L	GF	GA	GD	Win %
Serie C	2 September 2023	28 April 2023	Matchday 1	7th	38	15	9	14	50	44	+6	39.47
Promotion play-offs	7 May 2024		Group phase first round		5	3	1	1	9	4	+5	60.00
Coppa Italia Serie C	4 October 2023	28 November 2023	First round	Round of 16	3	2	0	1	8	4	+4	66.67
Total					46	20	10	16	67	52	+15	43.48

Last updated: 21 May 2024
Source: Soccerway

=== Serie C ===
==== League table ====
Pos	Team	Pld	W	D	L	GF	GA	GD	Pts	Qualification
5	Gubbio	38	16	11	11	50	38	+12	59	Group play-offs 1st round
6	Pescara	38	16	7	15	60	55	+5	55	Group play-offs 1st round
7	Juventus Next Gen	38	15	9	14	50	44	+6	54	Group play-offs 1st round
8	Arezzo	38	14	11	13	46	44	+2	53	Group play-offs 1st round
9	Pontedera	38	14	10	14	53	54	−1	52	Group play-offs 1st round

Updated to match(es) played on 28 April 2024. Source: Lega Pro, Soccerway (in English)
Rules for classification: 1) Points; 2) Head-to-head points; 3) Head-to-head goal difference; 4) Goal difference; 5) Goals scored; 6) Lower goals against; 7) Wins; 8) Lower losses; 9) Away wins; 10) Lower home losses.
(Note: Head-to-head record is used only after all the matches between the teams in question have been played)

==== Results summary ====
Overall								Home						Away					
Pld	W	D	L	GF	GA	GD	Pts	W	D	L	GF	GA	GD	W	D	L	GF	GA	GD
38	15	9	14	50	44	+6	54	8	6	5	26	21	+5	7	3	9	24	23	+1

Source: Worldfootball

==== Results by round ====
Round	1	2	3	4	5	6	7	8	9	10	11	12	13	14	15	16	17	18	19	20	21	22
Ground	A	H	A	H	A	H	A	A	H	A	H	A	H	A	H	A	H	A	H	H	A	H
Result	L	W	L	L	W	L	D	L	L	D	W	L	L	W	W	L	D	L	D	W	D	D
Position	18	9	11	16	10	13	13	16	18	17	16	18	19	16	15	15	15	16	16	14		

Updated to match(es) played on 20 January 2024. Source: Worldfootball
A = Away; H = Home; W = Win; D = Draw; L = Loss

==== Matches ====
The league fixtures were unveiled on 7 August 2023.

2 September 2023 1	Pescara	3–1	Juventus Next Gen	Pescara
20:45 CEST (UTC+2)	Cuppone 11', 42'; Accornero 34'; Pierno (yellow card) 55'	Report	Hasa (yellow card) 39'; Guerra 53', (yellow card) 72'; Huijsen (yellow card) 73'	Stadium: Stadio Adriatico – Giovanni Cornacchia; Referee: Domenico Mirabella

15 September 2023 3	Rimini	4–3	Juventus Next Gen	Rimini
20:45 CEST (UTC+2)	Capanni 3'; Lamesta 54'; Morra 70'; Gigli 87'		Comenencia 1'; Cerri 29'; Turicchia 68'	Stadium: Stadio Romeo Neri; Referee: Francesco Zago

19 September 2023 4	Juventus Next Gen	0–1	SPAL	Alessandria
20:45 CEST (UTC+2)		Report	Bertini 90+1'	Stadium: Stadio Giuseppe Moccagatta; Referee: Fabrizio Ramondino

23 September 2023 5	Ancona	1–2	Juventus Next Gen	Ancona
20:45 CEST (UTC+2)	Spagnoli 42'	Report	Yıldız 38'; Cerri 65'	Stadium: Stadio del Conero; Referee: Matteo Canci

27 September 2023 2	Juventus Next Gen	2–0	Recanatese	Alessandria
18:30 CEST (UTC+2)	Cerri 4'; Guerra 63'	Report		Stadium: Stadio Giuseppe Moccagatta; Referee: Andrea Zoppi
Note: Postponed from 8 September.

1 October 2023 6	Juventus Next Gen	0–1	Torres	Alessandria
14:00 CEST (UTC+2)			Liviero 74'	Stadium: Stadio Giuseppe Moccagatta; Referee: Fabio Rosario Luongo

8 October 2023 7	Sestri Levante	0–0	Juventus Next Gen	Sestri Levante
20:45 CEST (UTC+2)				Stadium: Stadio Giuseppe Sivori; Referee: Gianluca Catanzaro

22 October 2023 9	Juventus Next Gen	0–2	Perugia	Alessandria
14:00 CEST (UTC+2)			Vázquez 45+1' (pen.); Kouan 51'	Stadium: Stadio Giuseppe Moccagatta; Referee: Domenico Leone

25 October 2023 10	Gubbio	1–1	Juventus Next Gen	Gubbio
18:30 CEST (UTC+2)	Spina 61'		Guerra 45+3'	Stadium: Stadio Pietro Barbetti; Referee: Francesco Burlando

29 October 2023 11	Juventus Next Gen	3–1	Olbia	Alessandria
14:00 CET (UTC+1)	Salifou 60', 62'; Mbangula 90+4'		Spina 70'	Stadium: Stadio Giuseppe Moccagatta; Referee: Enrico Cappai

5 November 2023 12	Pontedera	1–0	Juventus Next Gen	Pontedera
16:15 CET (UTC+1)	Selleri 10'			Stadium: Stadio Ettore Mannucci; Referee: Alfredo Iannello

12 November 2023 13	Juventus Next Gen	0–1	Carrarese	Alessandria
20:45 CET (UTC+1)			Panico 62'	Stadium: Stadio Giuseppe Moccagatta; Referee: Claudio Allegretta

25 November 2023 15	Juventus Next Gen	1–0	Arezzo	Alessandria
18:30 CET (UTC+1)	Masetti 18' (o.g.)			Stadium: Stadio Giuseppe Moccagatta; Referee: Emanuele Ceriello

2 December 2023 16	Cesena	1–0	Juventus Next Gen	Cesena
16:15 CET (UTC+1)	Pieraccini 69'			Stadium: Stadio Dino Manuzzi; Referee: Giorgio Bozzetto

6 December 2023 8	Lucchese	1–0	Juventus Next Gen	Lucca
16:15 CET (UTC+1)	Pinna 90+1'			Stadium: Stadio Porta Elisa; Referee: Simone Gavini
Note: Postponed from 14 October.

9 December 2023 17	Juventus Next Gen	2–2	Pineto	Alessandria
16:15 CET (UTC+1)	Guerra 55'; Yıldız 90+4' (pen.)		Njambè 78'; Volpicelli 90+7' (pen.)	Stadium: Stadio Giuseppe Moccagatta; Referee: Gioele Iacobellis

16 December 2023 18	Fermana	2–1	Juventus Next Gen	Fermo
16:15 CET (UTC+1)	Santi 82'; Giandonato 89'		Guerra 55', (red card) 90+4'	Stadium: Stadio Bruno Recchioni; Referee: Cristiano Ursini

19 December 2023 14	Virtus Entella	0–1	Juventus Next Gen	Chiavari
20:30 CET (UTC+1)			Hasa 8'	Stadium: Stadio Comunale; Referee: Aleksandar Djurdjevic
Note: Postponed from 19 November.

23 December 2023 19	Juventus Next Gen	1–1	Vis Pesaro	Alessandria
16:15 CET (UTC+1)	Rouhi 43'		Di Paola 68'	Stadium: Stadio Giuseppe Moccagatta; Referee: Francesco D'Eusanio

7 January 2024 20	Juventus Next Gen	4–3	Pescara	Alessandria
14:00 CET (UTC+1)	Damiani 40'; Comenencia 56', (yellow card) 57'; Guerra 62', 79'; Rouhi (yellow card) 90'		Mesík (yellow card) 12' (yellow-red card) 90+4'; Cangiano 20'; Di Pasquale (yellow card) 31'; Aloi (yellow card) 36'; Squizzato (yellow card) 51'; Cuppone 60'; Merola (yellow card) 86'; Tunjov 90+2' (pen.)	Stadium: Stadio Giuseppe Moccagatta; Referee: Filippo Giaccaglia

14 January 2024 21	Recanatese	1–1	Juventus Next Gen	Recanati
14:00 CET (UTC+1)	Prisco (red card) 44'; Sbaffo (yellow card) 20', (goal) 59'		Damiani (yellow card) 55'; Muharemović 74'; Poli (yellow card) 80'	Stadium: Stadio Nicola Tubaldi; Referee: Federico Bruschi

20 January 2024 22	Juventus Next Gen	0–0	Rimini	Alessandria
16:15 CET (UTC+1)				Stadium: Stadio Giuseppe Moccagatta; Referee: Andrea Zoppi

28 January 2024 23	SPAL	1–3	Juventus Next Gen	Ferrara
18:30 CET (UTC+1)				Stadium: Stadio Paolo Mazza

3 February 2024 24	Juventus Next Gen	3–2	Ancona	Alessandria
				Stadium: Stadio Giuseppe Moccagatta

10 February 2024 25	Torres	1–3	Juventus Next Gen	Sassari

14 February 2024 26	Juventus Next Gen	1–0	Sestri Levante	Alessandria
				Stadium: Stadio Giuseppe Moccagatta

18 February 2024 27	Juventus Next Gen	1–1	Lucchese	Alessandria
				Stadium: Stadio Giuseppe Moccagatta

25 February 2024 28	Perugia	2–0	Juventus Next Gen	Perugia

2 March 2024 29	Juventus Next Gen	2–2	Gubbio	Alessandria
				Stadium: Stadio Giuseppe Moccagatta

6 March 2024 30	Olbia	0–4	Juventus Next Gen	Olbia

10 March 2024 31	Juventus Next Gen	1–1	Pontedera	Alessandria
				Stadium: Stadio Giuseppe Moccagatta

16 March 2024 32	Carrarese	1–0	Juventus Next Gen	Carrara

30 March 2024 34	Arezzo	0–1	Juventus Next Gen	Arezzo

3 April 2024 33	Juventus Next Gen	2–0	Virtus Entella	Alessandria
14:30				Stadium: Stadio Giuseppe Moccagatta; Referee: Leonardo Mastrodomenico
Note: The match was originally scheduled for 24 March 2024, but was postponed

7 April 2024 35	Juventus Next Gen	1–2	Cesena	Alessandria
16:15				Stadium: Stadio Giuseppe Moccagatta; Referee: Francesco Zago

14 April 2024 36	Pineto	1–2	Juventus Next Gen	Pineto
14:00				Stadium: Stadio Mimmo Pavone-Alessandro Mariani; Referee: Gianluca Renzi

21 April 2024 37	Juventus Next Gen	2–1	Fermana	Alessandria
16:30				Stadium: Stadio Giuseppe Moccagatta; Referee: Enrico Gigliotti

28 April 2024 38	Vis Pesaro	2–1	Juventus Next Gen	Pesaro
20:00				Stadium: Stadio Tonino Benelli; Referee: Matteo Canci

==== Promotion play-offs ====
===== Group phase =====
7 May 2024 First round	Juventus Next Gen	2–0	Arezzo	Alessandria
20:30				Stadium: Stadio Giuseppe Moccagatta; Referee: Gabriele Sacchi

11 May 2024 Second round	Pescara	1–3	Juventus Next Gen	Pescara
21:00				Stadium: Stadio Adriatico – Giovanni Cornacchia; Referee: Michele Delrio

===== National phase first round =====
14 May 2024 First leg	Juventus Next Gen	0–1	Casertana	Alessandria
20:30				Stadium: Stadio Giuseppe Moccagatta; Referee: Emanuele Frascaro

18 May 2024 Second leg	Casertana	1–3 (2–3 agg.)	Juventus Next Gen	Caserta
20:30				Stadium: Stadio Alberto Pinto; Referee: Andrea Zanotti

===== National phase second round =====
21 May 2024 First leg	Juventus Next Gen	1–1	Carrarese	Alessandria
20:30				Stadium: Stadio Giuseppe Moccagatta; Referee: Andrea Calzavara

25 May 2024 Second leg	Carrarese	2–2	Juventus Next Gen	Carrara
20:30				Stadium: Stadio dei Marmi; Referee: Alberto Ruben Arena

=== Coppa Italia Serie C ===
4 October 2023 First round	Pro Vercelli	1–5	Juventus Next Gen	Vercelli
18:30 CEST (UTC+2)	Gheza 8'	Report	Nonge Boende 18', 46'; Mancini 42', 54' (pen.), 66'	Stadium: Stadio Silvio Piola; Referee: Jules Roland Andeng Tona Mbei

8 November 2023 Second round	Juventus Next Gen	1–0 (a.e.t.)	Torres	Alessandria
14:00 CET (UTC+1)	Comenencia 97'	Report		Stadium: Stadio Giuseppe Moccagatta; Referee: Gemelli Enrico

28 November 2023 Round of 16	Lucchese	3–2 (a.e.t.)	Juventus Next Gen	Lucca
16:15 CET (UTC+1)	Pinna 85'; Magnaghi 114'; Russo 118'		Palumbo 90' (pen.); Guerra 103'	Stadium: Stadio Porta Elisa; Referee: Simone Gavini
