= 2026–27 Leeds United F.C. season =

Leeds United
2026–27 season
- Chairman: Paraag Marathe
- Manager: Daniel Farke
- Stadium: Elland Road
- Premier League: 9th
- FA Cup: Third round
- EFL Cup: Third round
- Top goalscorer: League: Dominic Calvert-Lewin (3); All: Dominic Calvert-Lewin (4)
- Highest home attendance: 36,983 vs Manchester United (18 October 2026, Premier League)
- Lowest home attendance: 35,974 vs Brentford (30 August 2026, Premier League)
- Average home league attendance: 35,974
Home colours	Away colours	Third colours

The 2026–27 season sees Leeds United competing in the Premier League for a second successive season.

== Pre-season and friendlies ==
Leeds United announced pre-season friendlies against Wrexham, Sunderland, Liverpool, Manchester United, RB Leipzig and FC Augsburg.

Win Draw Loss Fixtures

25 July 2026 Friendly	Leeds United	2–3	Wrexham	Tampa, Florida, United States
19:30 EDT	Piroe 29'; Longstaff 45'	Report	Moore 1'; Cadamarteri 45'; Smith 85'	Stadium: Raymond James Stadium; Referee: Joe Surgan

30 July 2026 Friendly	Leeds United	1–0	Sunderland	Harrison, New Jersey, United States
19:30 EDT	Nmecha 8'	Report		Stadium: Sports Illustrated Stadium; Referee: Sergii Demianchuk

2 August 2026 Friendly	Liverpool	2–4	Leeds United	Chicago, United States
15:00 CDT	Chambers 7'; Wirtz 40'	Report	Aaronson 60'; Calvert-Lewin 71', 84'; Longstaff 73'	Stadium: Soldier Field; Attendance: 49,128; Referee: Alexis Da Silva

8 August 2026 Friendly	Leeds United	2–0	RB Leipzig	Leeds
14:00 BST	Calvert-Lewin 7'; Nmecha 109'	Report		Stadium: Elland Road; Attendance: 24,630; Referee: Craig Pawson

12 August 2026 Friendly	Manchester United	1–1 (5–4 p)	Leeds United	Dublin, Ireland
19:30 BST	Zirkzee 16'	Report	Aaronson 29'	Stadium: Croke Park; Attendance: 82,300; Referee: Neil Doyle
	Penalties
	Shaw (penalty scored); Cunha (penalty scored); Fletcher (penalty scored); Fernandes (penalty missed); Tielemans (penalty scored); Mazraoui (penalty scored)		(penalty scored) Calvert-Lewin; (penalty missed) Wilson; (penalty scored) Stach; (penalty scored) Gnonto; (penalty scored) Okafor; (penalty missed) Justin

15 August 2026 Friendly	Leeds United	4–0	FC Augsburg	Leeds
15:00 BST	Stach 1'; Muharemović 19'; Justin 28'; Nmecha 82'	Report		Stadium: Elland Road; Attendance: 21,894; Referee: Michael Salisbury

== Competitions ==
=== Overall record ===
Competition	First match	Last match	Starting round	Final position	Record							
Competition	First match	Last match	Starting round	Final position	Pld	W	D	L	GF	GA	GD	Win %
Premier League	22 August 2026	30 May 2027	Matchday 1	TBC	10	3	5	2	10	8	+2	30.00
FA Cup	January 2027	TBC	Third round	TBC	0	0	0	0	0	0	+0	—
EFL Cup	25 August 2026	9 September 2026	Second round	Third round	2	1	0	1	5	6	−1	50.00
Total					12	4	5	3	15	14	+1	33.33

Last updated: 7 November 2026
Source: Soccerway

=== Premier League ===
==== League table ====
Pos	Team	Pld	W	D	L	GF	GA	GD	Pts	Qualification or relegation
4	Bournemouth	11	5	3	3	18	14	+4	18	Qualification for the Champions League league phase
5	Liverpool	10	5	3	2	14	10	+4	18	Qualification for the Europa League league phase (Note: The winners of the 2026–27 FA Cup and the 5th-placed team both qualify for the Europa League. If the FA Cup winners finish in the top five, the 6th-placed team will qualify. If England are one of the two associations with the highest UEFA coefficient points, 5th place will qualify for the Champions League and the other qualifying spots will move down one position.)
6	Leeds United	11	4	5	2	14	9	+5	17	
7	Everton	10	4	4	2	12	10	+2	16	
8	Chelsea	11	5	1	5	20	20	0	16	

Updated to match(es) played on 21 November 2026. Source: Premier League
Rules for classification: 1) Points; 2) Goal difference; 3) Goals scored; 4) If the champions, relegated teams or qualified teams for UEFA competitions cannot be determined by rules 1 to 3 following the completion of the competition, rules 4.1 to 4.3 are applied between such teams – 4.1) Head-to-head points; 4.2) Head-to-head away goals; 4.3) Play-off at a neutral site.

==== Results summary ====
Overall								Home						Away					
Pld	W	D	L	GF	GA	GD	Pts	W	D	L	GF	GA	GD	W	D	L	GF	GA	GD
11	4	5	2	14	9	+5	17	2	3	0	7	3	+4	2	2	2	7	6	+1

Last updated: 21 November 2026.
Source: Soccerway

==== Results by round ====
Round	1	2	3	4	5	6	7	8	9	10	11	12	13	14	15	16	17	18	19	20
Ground	A	H	A	H	H	A	H	A	A	H	A	H	A	H	A	H	A	A	H	H
Result	W	D	D	W	D	L	D	D	L	W	W									
Position	9	8	9	3	5	7	7	7	12	9										

Updated to match(es) played on 21 November 2026. Source: Soccerway
A = Away; H = Home; W = Win; D = Draw; L = Loss; P = Postponed

==== Matches ====
22 August 2026 1	Nottingham Forest	0–1	Leeds United	Nottingham
15:00 BST		Report	Stach 88'	Stadium: City Ground; Attendance: 30,739; Referee: Robert Jones

30 August 2026 2	Leeds United	1–1	Brentford	Leeds
14:00 BST	Calvert-Lewin 79'	Report	Schade 41'	Stadium: Elland Road; Attendance: 35,974; Referee: Tony Harrington
Note: Fixture was initially scheduled for 29 August, but was rescheduled for live Sky Sports broadcasting.

5 September 2026 3	Brighton & Hove Albion	1–1	Leeds United	Brighton
15:00 BST	Vušković 71'	Report	Bogle 15'	Stadium: Falmer Stadium; Attendance: 31,661; Referee: Stuart Attwell

14 September 2026 4	Leeds United	4–1	Newcastle United	Leeds
20:00 BST	Miley 32' (o.g.); Calvert-Lewin 34', 45+1'; Okafor 59'	Report	Touré 90'	Stadium: Elland Road; Attendance: 36,693; Referee: Michael Salisbury
Note: Fixture was initially scheduled for 12 September, but was rescheduled for live Sky Sports broadcasting.

20 September 2026 5	Leeds United	0–0	Crystal Palace	Leeds
14:00 BST		Report		Stadium: Elland Road; Attendance: 36,462; Referee: Adam Herczeg
Note: Fixture was initially scheduled for 19 September, but was pushed back a day due to Crystal Palace's involvement in the UEFA Europa League on the preceding Thursday.

10 October 2026 6	Arsenal	2–1	Leeds United	Holloway
12:30 BST	Calafiori 62'; Bruno Guimarães 70'	Report	Justin 55'	Stadium: Emirates Stadium; Attendance: 60,315; Referee: Paul Tierney
Note: Fixture was initially scheduled for a 15:00 kick-off, but was brought forward for live TNT Sports broadcasting.

18 October 2026 7	Leeds United	1–1	Manchester United	Leeds
14:00 BST	Calvert-Lewin 51'	Report	Mbeumo 35'	Stadium: Elland Road; Attendance: 36,983; Referee: Darren England
Note: Fixture was initially scheduled for 17 October, but was rescheduled a day later for live Sky Sports broadcasting.

25 October 2026 8	Sunderland	0–0	Leeds United	Sunderland
16:30 BST		Report		Stadium: Stadium of Light; Attendance: 46,182; Referee: Stuart Attwell
Note: Fixture was initially scheduled for 24 October, but was rescheduled a day later for live Sky Sports broadcasting.

31 October 2026 9	Bournemouth	2–0	Leeds United	Bournemouth
15:00 GMT	Evanilson 31'; Adli 90+4'	Report		Stadium: Dean Court; Attendance: 12,041; Referee: Michael Salisbury

7 November 2026 10	Leeds United	1–0	Tottenham Hotspur	Leeds
12:30 GMT	Okafor 79'	Report		Stadium: Elland Road; Attendance: 36,924; Referee: John Brooks
Note: Fixture was initially scheduled for a 15:00 kick-off, but was brought forward for live TNT Sports broadcasting.

21 November 2026 11	Chelsea	1–4	Leeds United	Fulham
15:00 GMT	Emegha 25'	Report	Okafor 28', 59'; Calvert-Lewin 53' (pen.); Aaronson 90+1'	Stadium: Stamford Bridge; Attendance: 39,573; Referee: Michael Oliver

28 November 2026 12	Leeds United	v	Coventry City	Leeds
15:00 GMT				Stadium: Elland Road

2 December 2026 13	Manchester City	v	Leeds United	Manchester
19:30 GMT				Stadium: Etihad Stadium
Note: Fixture was initially scheduled for a 20:00 kick-off, but was brought forward half an hour for live Sky Sports broadcasting.

5 December 2026 14	Leeds United	v	Ipswich Town	Leeds
15:00 GMT				Stadium: Elland Road

12 December 2026 15	Liverpool	v	Leeds United	Liverpool
15:00 GMT				Stadium: Anfield

19 December 2026 16	Leeds United	v	Fulham	Leeds
15:00 GMT				Stadium: Elland Road

26 December 2026 17	Aston Villa	v	Leeds United	Birmingham
12:30 GMT				Stadium: Villa Park
Note: Fixture was initially scheduled for a 15:00 kick-off, but was brought forward for live TNT Sports broadcasting.

29 December 2026 18	Hull City	v	Leeds United	Hull
19:30 GMT				Stadium: MKM Stadium
Note: Fixture was initially scheduled for 30 December, but was brought forward a day for live Sky Sports broadcasting.

1 January 2027 19	Leeds United	v	Everton	Leeds
20:00 GMT				Stadium: Elland Road
Note: Fixture was initially scheduled for 2 January, but was brought forward a day for live Sky Sports broadcasting.

6 January 2027 20	Leeds United	v	Manchester City	Leeds
20:15 GMT				Stadium: Elland Road
Note: Fixture was initially scheduled for a 15:00 kick-off, but was pushed back for live Sky Sports broadcasting.

=== EFL Cup ===
25 August 2026 Second round	Nottingham Forest	0–2	Leeds United	Nottingham
20:00 BST		Report	James 50'; Justin 75'	Stadium: City Ground; Attendance: 24,542; Referee: Andrew Kitchen

9 September 2026 Third round	Chelsea	6–3	Leeds United	Fulham
20:15 BST	Palmer 53' (pen.), 55'; Neto 60'; Welbeck 65', 90+4'; Barco 80'	Report	Muharemović 23'; Aaronson 48'; Calvert-Lewin 75'	Stadium: Stamford Bridge; Attendance: 35,696; Referee: Jarred Gillett
Note: Kick-off was delayed by fifteen minutes due to disruption on the London Underground.

== Statistics ==
As of match played 7 November 2026

No.	Pos.	Name	League		FA Cup		EFL Cup		Total		Discipline	
No.	Pos.	Name	Apps	Goals	Apps	Goals	Apps	Goals	Apps	Goals	Yellow card	Red card
1	GK	(England) James Trafford	10	0	0	0	1	0	11	0	0	0
2	DF	(England) Jayden Bogle	10	1	0	0	0+1	0	10+1	1	3	0
3	DF	(Sweden) Gabriel Gudmundsson	8	0	0	0	0+1	0	8+1	0	1	0
4	MF	(Wales) Ethan Ampadu	10	0	0	0	2	0	12	0	5	0
5	DF	(Bosnia and Herzegovina) Tarik Muharemović	10	0	0	0	2	1	12	1	1	0
6	DF	(Wales) Joe Rodon	2+1	0	0	0	1	0	3+1	0	0	0
7	MF	(Wales) Daniel James	1+3	0	0	0	2	1	3+3	1	0	0
8	MF	(England) Sean Longstaff	1+5	0	0	0	2	0	3+5	0	2	0
9	FW	(England) Dominic Calvert-Lewin	10	4	0	0	0+2	1	10+2	5	2	0
10	FW	(Wales) Harry Wilson	3+5	0	0	0	1+1	0	4+6	0	1	0
11	MF	(United States) Brenden Aaronson	3+5	0	0	0	1+1	1	4+6	1	0	0
14	FW	(Germany) Lukas Nmecha	1+8	0	0	0	2	0	3+8	0	0	0
15	DF	(Slovenia) Jaka Bijol	3+2	0	0	0	1	0	4+2	0	0	0
16	GK	(Germany) Michael Zetterer	0	0	0	0	1	0	1	0	0	0
18	MF	(Germany) Anton Stach	7+2	1	0	0	0+2	0	7+4	1	0	0
19	FW	(Switzerland) Noah Okafor	6+3	2	0	0	1+1	0	7+4	2	1	0
22	MF	(Japan) Ao Tanaka	8+1	0	0	0	1+1	0	9+2	0	3	0
23	FW	(France) Jean-Mattéo Bahoya	0+3	0	0	0	0	0	0+3	0	0	0
24	DF	(England) James Justin	10	1	0	0	2	1	12	2	1	0
26	DF	(France) Melvin Bard	0+2	0	0	0	1	0	1+2	0	0	0
30	DF	(Switzerland) Nico Elvedi	7+1	0	0	0	1	0	8+1	0	1	0
44	MF	(Bulgaria) Ilia Gruev	0+1	0	0	0	0	0	0+1	0	0	0

== Transfers ==
=== In ===
Date	Pos.	Name	From	Fee	Ref.
8 July 2026	FW	(Wales) Harry Wilson	(England) Fulham	Free	
17 July 2026	DF	(Bosnia and Herzegovina) Tarik Muharemović	(Italy) Sassuolo	£34,000,000	
6 August 2026	GK	(England) James Trafford	(England) Manchester City	£45,000,000	
19 August 2026	DF	(Switzerland) Nico Elvedi	(Germany) Borussia Mönchengladbach	£8,500,000	
21 August 2026	FW	(North Macedonia) Ditmir Hodja	(North Macedonia) Rabotnicki	Free	
29 August 2026	GK	(Germany) Michael Zetterer	(Germany) Eintracht Frankfurt	Undisclosed	

=== Out ===
Date	Pos.	Name	To	Fee	Ref.
30 June 2026	MF	(Scotland) Devon Brockie	Unattached	Released	
30 June 2026	DF	(England) Sam Byram	Unattached	Released	
30 June 2026	GK	(Wales) Karl Darlow	(England) Manchester United	Free	
30 June 2026	MF	(England) Connor Douglas	Unattached	Released	
30 June 2026	GK	(France) Illan Meslier	Unattached	Released	
30 June 2026	FW	(Scotland) Lewis Pirie	Unattached	Released	
30 June 2026	DF	(Netherlands) Pascal Struijk	(England) Brighton & Hove Albion	£15,000,000	
30 June 2026	FW	(England) Marley Wilson	Unattached	Released	
16 July 2026	DF	(Switzerland) Isaac Schmidt	(Switzerland) Young Boys	£2,000,000	
22 July 2026	DF	(Austria) Maximilian Wöber	Released		
26 July 2026	MF	(England) Jack Harrison	(United States) New England Revolution	Undisclosed	
15 August 2026	FW	(England) Joe Gelhardt	(England) Hull City	£6,500,000	

=== Loan in ===
Date from	Date to	Pos.	Name	From	Ref.
1 September 2026	30 June 2027	DF	(France) Melvin Bard	(France) Nice	
2 September 2026	30 June 2027	FW	(France) Jean-Mattéo Bahoya	(Germany) Eintracht Frankfurt	

=== Loan out ===
Date from	Date to	Pos.	Name	To	Ref.
7 July 2026	30 June 2027	FW	(England) Harry Gray	(England) Sheffield Wednesday	
5 August 2026	30 June 2027	MF	(Wales) Charlie Crew	(England) Walsall	
14 August 2026	2 January 2027	DF	(England) Reuben Lopata-White	(England) Altrincham	
19 August 2026	30 June 2027	FW	(Suriname) Joël Piroe	(England) West Ham United	
19 August 2026	30 June 2027	DF	(Belgium) Sebastiaan Bornauw	(Germany) Hamburg	
28 August 2026	29 October 2026 (Note: On 29 September, Bird's initial one-month loan at Emley was extended by a further month.)	DF	(England) Coban Bird	(England) Emley	
29 August 2026	30 June 2027	GK	(Brazil) Lucas Perri	(Italy) Torino	
1 September 2026	30 June 2027	MF	(Scotland) Sam Chambers	(England) Northampton Town	
1 September 2026	30 June 2027	FW	(Italy) Wilfried Gnonto	(Italy) Fiorentina	
1 September 2026	30 June 2027	FW	(Belgium) Largie Ramazani	(England) Burnley	
19 September 2026	23 November 2026 (Note: On 23 October, Render's initial one-month loan at Darlington was extended for a further month.)	FW	(England) Jacob Render	(England) Darlington	
25 September 2026	23 October 2026	DF	(Northern Ireland) Luke Matykiewicz	(England) Ilkeston Town	
29 October 2026	29 November 2026	DF	(England) Coban Bird	(England) Hebburn Town	
29 October 2026	29 November 2026	DF	(Northern Ireland) Luke Matykiewicz	(England) Emley	
6 November 2026	6 December 2026	FW	(Scotland) Josh McDonald	(England) Scarborough Athletic	
