= Jonas Rouhi =

Swedish footballer (born 2004)

Personal information
- Full name: Jonas Jakob Rouhi
- Date of birth: 7 January 2004 (age 22)
- Place of birth: Botkyrka, Sweden
- Height: 1.84 m (6 ft 0 in)
- Position: Defender

Team information
- Current team: Carrarese (on loan from Juventus)
- Number: 73

Youth career
- Tullinge TP
- Hammarby IF
- –2019: IF Brommapojkarna
- 2020–2023: Juventus

Senior career*
Years	Team	Apps	(Gls)
2023–	Juventus Next Gen	31	(2)
2024–	Juventus	5	(0)
2026–	→ Carrarese (loan)	15	(1)

International career^{‡}
2019–2020	Sweden U17	6	(1)
2021–2023	Sweden U19	18	(0)
2024–2025	Sweden U21	15	(1)
- * Club domestic league appearances and goals as of 13 May 2026 ‡ National team caps and goals as of 21:50, 11 September 2025 (UTC)

Jonas Jakob Rouhi (born 7 January 2004) is a Swedish professional footballer who plays as a defender for Serie B club Carrarese, on loan from Juventus.

== Club career ==
=== Juventus ===
Rouhi played for the youth academy of Serie A side Juventus.

On 26 August 2024, Rouhi made his Serie A debut for Juventus, coming on as a substitute in the 77th minute against Hellas Verona. A month later, on 28 September, Rouhi made his full debut for the club against Genoa, playing 74 minutes in a 3–0 win.

==== Loan to Carrarese ====
On 30 January 2026, Rouhi joined Carrarese in Serie B on loan for the rest of the 2025–26 season.

== Style of play ==
Rouhi mainly operates as a left-back.

== Personal life ==
Rouhi was born in Sweden to a Moroccan father and a Polish mother.

== Career statistics ==
=== Club ===
As of match played 22 March 2026

Appearances and goals by club, season and competition
Club	Season	League			Coppa Italia		Cotninental		Other		Total	
Club	Season	Division	Apps	Goals	Apps	Goals	Apps	Goals	Apps	Goals	Apps	Goals
Juventus Next Gen	2023–24	Serie C	22	2	—		—		7 (Note: One appearance in Coppa Italia Serie C; Six appearances in Serie C Promotion play-offs)	0	29	2
Juventus Next Gen	2024–25	Serie C	2	0	—		—		0	0	2	0
Juventus Next Gen	2025–26	Serie C	7	0	—		—		0	0	7	0
Juventus Next Gen	Total		31	2	—		—		7	0	38	2
Juventus	2024–25	Serie A	5	0	0	0	0	0	0	0	5	0
Juventus	2025–26	Serie A	0	0	0	0	0	0	—		0	0
Juventus	Total		5	0	0	0	0	0	0	0	5	0
Carrarese (loan)	2025–26	Serie B	10	1	—		—		—		10	1
Career total			46	3	0	0	0	0	7	0	53	3
