= Lloyd Kelly =

English footballer (born 1998)

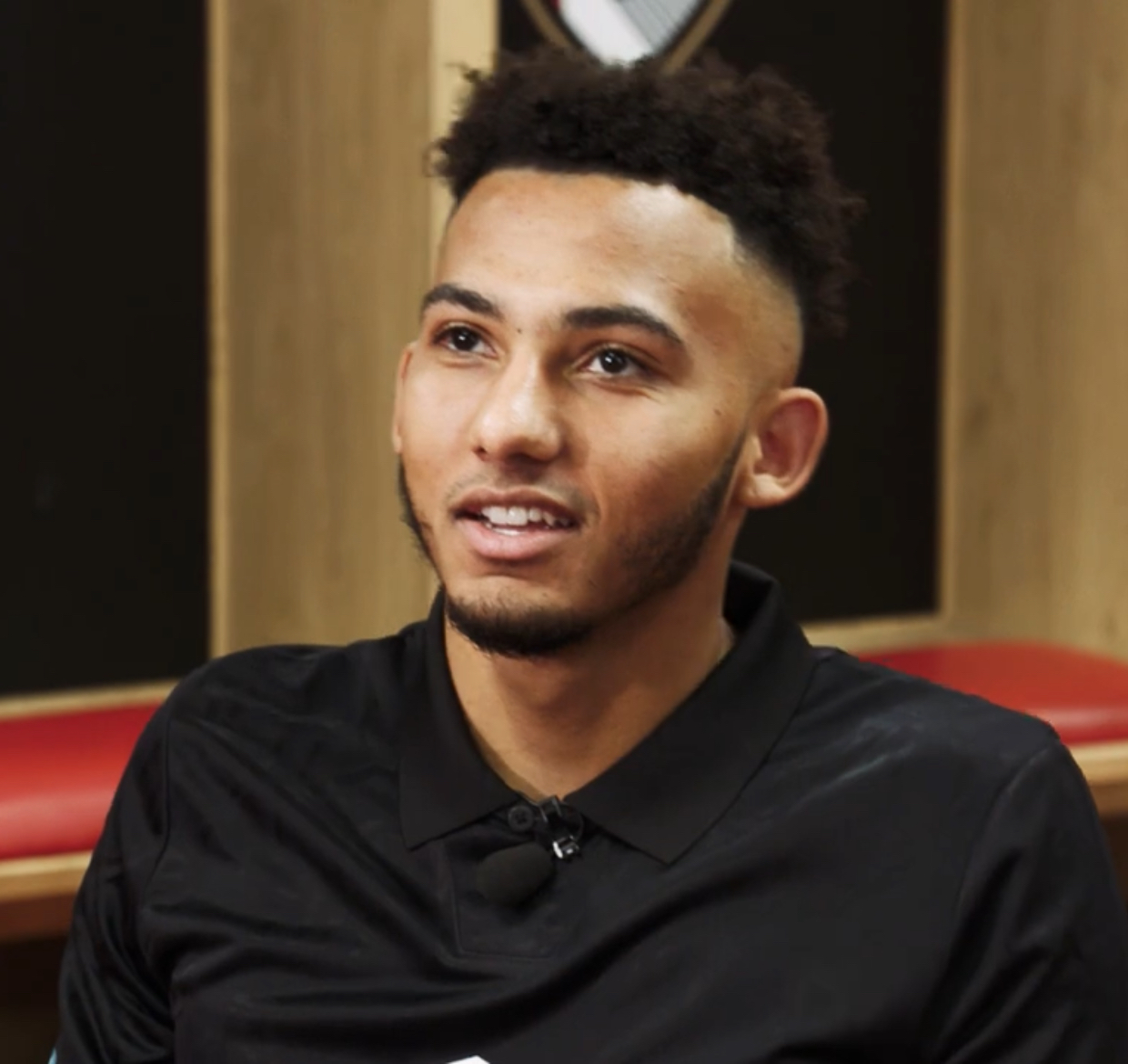
- Kelly with AFC Bournemouth in 2020

Personal information
- Full name: Lloyd Casius Kelly
- Date of birth: 6 October 1998 (age 28)
- Place of birth: Bristol, England
- Height: 1.90 m (6 ft 3 in)
- Positions: Centre-back; left-back

Team information
- Current team: Juventus
- Number: 6

Youth career
- 2011–2017: Bristol City

Senior career*
Years	Team	Apps	(Gls)
2017–2019	Bristol City	43	(2)
2019–2024	Bournemouth	131	(2)
2024–2025	Newcastle United	10	(0)
2025	→ Juventus (loan)	12	(0)
2025–	Juventus	35	(1)

International career
2017–2018	England U20	9	(0)
2018–2021	England U21	10	(0)
- * Club domestic league appearances and goals as of 24 May 2026 (UTC)

Lloyd Casius Kelly (born 6 October 1998) is an English professional footballer who plays as a defender for Serie A club Juventus. Primarily a left-footed centre-back, he can also play as a left-back. Kelly previously played for Bristol City, AFC Bournemouth and Newcastle United. He captained Bournemouth during their promotion to the Premier League in 2022 and was selected for the 2021–22 PFA Championship Team of the Year. A 2024 Premier League analysis ranked Kelly in the 96th percentile (top 4%) for shot-creating actions among centre-backs across Europe's five major leagues. During the 2025–26 season, he also ranked in the top 4% of centre-backs in Scout Arena's Serie A comparison for ball recoveries, recording 228 across its all-competitions sample. In September 2025, Kelly became the first English player to score for Juventus in the UEFA Champions League, netting a stoppage-time equaliser against Borussia Dortmund.

== Club career ==
=== Bristol City ===
Kelly joined Bristol City at the age of 12 after he was spotted playing for local side Bristol Central. In 2015–16, he was included in City's pre-season squad that visited Portugal. On 8 August 2017, Kelly made his debut for Bristol City in a 5–0 victory against Plymouth Argyle in the EFL Cup. Kelly made his first league start on 23 December 2017 against Queens Park Rangers, and scored his first league goal against Reading just three days later. At the end of the 2017–18 season, he was named the Senior Reds' Young Player of the Year.

On 19 March 2018, he was named in the EFL "Team of the Week" for gameweek 38. He was praised for his 'maturity in defence' as well as providing the assist for the only goal of the game against Ipswich Town.

=== AFC Bournemouth ===
On 18 May 2019, Kelly signed for Premier League club AFC Bournemouth for an undisclosed fee, reported as £13 million, after eight years at Bristol City. He made his debut for Bournemouth in an EFL Cup tie against Burton Albion on 25 September 2019. His league debut followed in June 2020 when he played as a substitute against Wolverhampton Wanderers. He scored his first goal for the club on 17 April 2021 in a 3–1 win against Norwich City.

For the 2021–22 season, Kelly began to captain Bournemouth in the absence of club captain Steve Cook, beginning with the opening fixture of the campaign; a 2–2 home draw against West Bromwich Albion. Kelly started the first 14 games of the season, playing a pivotal role in the Cherries' unbeaten start. This 14-game unbeaten run equalled a club record dating back to 1961. Kelly scored his first goal of the season in a 3–0 home win against Huddersfield Town. Kelly was later confirmed as the Cherries' club captain after the departure of previous captain Steve Cook.

On 5 June 2024, the club announced he would be leaving in the summer when his contract expired.

=== Newcastle United ===
On 13 June 2024, Newcastle United announced the signing of Kelly on a free transfer, joining the club from 1 July under his former coach Eddie Howe.

=== Juventus ===
On 3 February 2025, Kelly joined Juventus on loan, with an obligation to make the transfer permanent at the end of the season.

In May 2025, the club confirmed that they have permanently signed Kelly for a transfer fee of €17.5 million, with additional performance-based add-ons. Later that year, on 13 September, he scored his first goal, opening the score in a 4–3 victory over Inter Milan. Three days later, he netted his first UEFA Champions League goal, a stoppage-time equalizer in a 4–4 draw against Borussia Dortmund.

== International career ==
In August 2017, Kelly made his debut for England U20, coming on as a substitute in a 3–0 win over the Netherlands. On 12 November 2018, he received his first call-up to the under-21 side and made his debut as a third minute substitute during a 2–1 win over Italy in Ferrara on 15 November 2018.

Kelly was a member of England's 23-man squad for the 2019 UEFA European Under-21 Championship and 2021 UEFA European Under-21 Championship.

== Personal life ==
Born in England, Kelly is of Jamaican descent. From the age of six, Kelly spent twelve years in foster care alongside his siblings.

== Career statistics ==
As of match played 24 May 2026

Appearances and goals by club, season and competition
Club	Season	League			National cup (Note: Includes FA Cup, Coppa Italia)		League cup (Note: Includes EFL Cup)		Europe		Other		Total	
Club	Season	Division	Apps	Goals	Apps	Goals	Apps	Goals	Apps	Goals	Apps	Goals	Apps	Goals
Bristol City	2016–17	Championship	0	0	0	0	0	0	—		—		0	0
Bristol City	2017–18	Championship	11	1	1	0	2	0	—		—		14	1
Bristol City	2018–19	Championship	32	1	1	0	1	0	—		—		34	1
Bristol City	Total		43	2	2	0	3	0	—		—		48	2
AFC Bournemouth	2019–20	Premier League	8	0	0	0	1	0	—		—		9	0
AFC Bournemouth	2020–21	Championship	36	1	1	0	2	0	—		2 (Note: Appearances in Championship play-offs)	0	41	1
AFC Bournemouth	2021–22	Championship	41	1	0	0	1	0	—		—		42	1
AFC Bournemouth	2022–23	Premier League	23	0	1	0	0	0	—		—		24	0
AFC Bournemouth	2023–24	Premier League	23	0	1	1	1	0	—		—		25	1
AFC Bournemouth	Total		131	2	3	1	5	0	—		2	0	141	3
Newcastle United	2024–25	Premier League	10	0	1	0	3	0	—		—		14	0
Juventus (loan)	2024–25	Serie A	12	0	1	0	—		2 (Note: Appearances in UEFA Champions League)	0	4 (Note: Appearances in FIFA Club World Cup)	0	19	0
Juventus	2025–26	Serie A	35	1	2	0	—		9	1	—		46	2
Juventus	Juventus total		47	1	3	0	—		11	1	4	0	65	2
Career total			231	5	9	1	11	0	11	1	6	0	268	7

== Honours ==
AFC Bournemouth

- Championship runner-up: 2021–22

Newcastle United

- EFL Cup: 2024–25

Individual

- EFL Championship Team of the Season: 2021–22
- PFA Team of the Year: 2021–22 Championship
