= Sam Chambers =

Scottish footballer

Personal information
- Full name: Samuel Rory Chambers
- Date of birth: 18 August 2007 (age 19)
- Place of birth: Leeds, England
- Height: 1.76 m (5 ft 9 in)
- Position: Midfielder

Team information
- Current team: Northampton Town (on loan from Leeds United)
- Number: 26

Youth career
- Leeds United

Senior career*
Years	Team	Apps	(Gls)
2024–	Leeds United	1	(0)
2026–	→ Northampton Town (loan)	3	(0)

International career^{‡}
2022–2023	Scotland U16	3	(0)
2023	Scotland U17	2	(0)
2024–	Scotland U19	3	(0)
- * Club domestic league appearances and goals as of 15:48, 18 November 2026 (UTC) ‡ National team caps and goals as of 21:13, 4 November 2024 (UTC)

Samuel Rory Chambers (born 18 August 2007) is a professional footballer who plays as a midfielder for EFL League Two club Northampton Town on loan from Premier League club Leeds United. He is a Scotland Under 19 international.

== Career ==
A product of the Leeds United academy, Chambers signed his first professional contract with the club in March 2024 until the end of the 2025–26 season. He made his first team debut for Leeds on 2 November 2024, in the 3–0 EFL Championship win against Plymouth Argyle as a second-half substitute.

On 1 September 2026, he moved to EFL League Two club Northampton Town on loan for the remainder of the 2026-27 season.

== Career statistics ==
As of 18 November 2026

Appearances and goals by club, season and competition
Club	Season	League			FA Cup		EFL Cup		Other		Total	
Club	Season	Division	Apps	Goals	Apps	Goals	Apps	Goals	Apps	Goals	Apps	Goals
Leeds United	2024–25	Championship	1	0	1	0	0	0	—		2	0
Leeds United	2025–26	Premier League	0	0	0	0	0	0	1 (Note: Appearances in EFL Trophy)	0	1	0
Leeds United	2026–27	Premier League	0	0	0	0	0	0	—		0	0
Northampton Town (loan)	2026–27	League Two	3	0	0	0	0	0	0	0	3	0
Career total			4	0	1	0	0	0	1	0	6	0

== Honours ==
Leeds

- EFL Championship: 2024–25
