= Tarik Muharemović =

Bosnian footballer (born 2003)

Personal information
- Date of birth: 28 February 2003 (age 23)
- Place of birth: Ljubljana, Slovenia
- Height: 1.92 m (6 ft 4 in)
- Position: Centre-back

Team information
- Current team: Leeds United
- Number: 5

Youth career
- 2009–2010: Austria Kärnten
- 2010–2019: Austria Klagenfurt
- 2019–2020: Wolfsberger AC

Senior career*
Years	Team	Apps	(Gls)
2020	Wolfsberger AC II	10	(0)
2021	Wolfsberger AC	5	(0)
2021–2025	Juventus Next Gen	47	(2)
2024–2025	→ Sassuolo (loan)	28	(1)
2025–2026	Sassuolo	32	(2)
2026–	Leeds United	11	(0)

International career^{‡}
2021–2022	Bosnia and Herzegovina U19	6	(0)
2021–2024	Bosnia and Herzegovina U21	13	(1)
2024–	Bosnia and Herzegovina	22	(2)
- * Club domestic league appearances and goals as of 21 November 2026 ‡ National team caps and goals as of 17 November 2026

Tarik Muharemović (pronounced [tâːrik muxâːremoʋitɕ]; born 28 February 2003) is a professional footballer who plays as a centre-back for Premier League club Leeds United. Born in Slovenia, he plays for the Bosnia and Herzegovina national team.

Muharemović started his professional career at Wolfsberger AC, playing mainly in its reserve team, before joining Juventus Next Gen in 2021, who loaned him to Sassuolo in 2024, with whom he signed permanently the following year. He moved to Leeds United in 2026.

A former youth international for Bosnia and Herzegovina, Muharemović made his senior international debut in 2024, earning over 20 caps since. He represented the nation at the 2026 FIFA World Cup.

== Club career ==
=== Early career ===
Muharemović started playing football at local clubs, before joining Wolfsberger AC's youth setup in 2019. He made his professional debut against Red Bull Salzburg on 25 April 2021 at the age of 18.

=== Juventus ===
In August 2021, Muharemović moved to Italian side Juventus on a four-year deal. On 11 December 2022, he scored his first professional goal playing for Juventus' reserve squad against Arzignano.

In September 2023, he signed a new three-year contract with the team.

=== Sassuolo ===
In August 2024, Muharemović was sent on a season-long loan to Sassuolo. He made his official debut for the side on 21 September against Cosenza. On 24 September, he scored his first goal for the outfit in a Coppa Italia game against Lecce. Three months later, he scored his first league goal in a triumph over Salernitana.

In April 2025, Sassuolo signed him on a multi-year deal.

Muharemović was an important piece in Sassuolo's conquest of the Serie B title, his first trophy with the club, which was secured on 4 May and earned them promotion to the Serie A just one season after being relegated.

In October, he extended his contract with the squad until June 2031.

=== Leeds United ===
In July 2026, Muharemović signed a five-year deal with English outfit Leeds United. He made his competitive debut for the team against Nottingham Forest on 22 August. On 9 September, he scored his first goal for Leeds United in an EFL Cup match against Chelsea.

== International career ==
Muharemović represented Bosnia and Herzegovina at various youth levels. He also served as a captain of the under-21 team under coach Vinko Marinović.

In May 2024, he received his first senior call up, for friendly games against England and Italy. He debuted against the former on 3 June.

On 10 June 2025, in a friendly match against Slovenia, he scored his first senior international goal.

In June 2026, Muharemović was named in Bosnia and Herzegovina's squad for the 2026 FIFA World Cup. He made his tournament debut in the opening group tie against Canada on 12 June. In Bosnia and Herzegovina's round of 32 defeat against the United States, Muharemović was fouled by Folarin Balogun who received a red card; Balogun's one-match ban was later suspended following an appeal by the U.S. Soccer Federation and a call by U.S. president Donald Trump to FIFA president Gianni Infantino.

== Personal life ==
Muharemović is a practising Muslim; together with international teammates Amar Dedić, Ermedin Demirović and Dženis Burnić he visited a mosque in Sarajevo during the national team's concentration.

His younger brother Kenan is also a professional footballer.

== Career statistics ==
=== Club ===
As of match played 21 November 2026

Appearances and goals by club, season and competition
Club	Season	League			National cup (Note: Includes Coppa Italia)		League cup (Note: Includes EFL Cup)		Other		Total	
Club	Season	Division	Apps	Goals	Apps	Goals	Apps	Goals	Apps	Goals	Apps	Goals
Wolfsberger AC II	2020–21	Austrian Regionalliga Central	10	0	–		–		–		10	0
Wolfsberger AC	2020–21	Austrian Bundesliga	5	0	–		–		1 (Note: Appearance in Austrian Bundesliga play-offs for UEFA Conference League)	0	6	0
Juventus Next Gen	2022–23	Serie C	13	1	–		–		3 (Note: Appearances in Coppa Italia Serie C)	0	16	1
Juventus Next Gen	2023–24	Serie C	34	1	–		–		7 (Note: Six appearances in Serie C promotion play-offs; one appearance in Coppa Italia Serie C)	0	41	1
Juventus Next Gen	Total		47	2	–		–		10	0	57	2
Sassuolo (loan)	2024–25	Serie B	28	1	2	1	–		–		30	2
Sassuolo	2025–26	Serie A	32	2	1	0	–		–		33	2
Sassuolo	Total		60	3	3	1	–		–		63	4
Leeds United	2026–27	Premier League	11	0	0	0	2	1	–		13	1
Career total			133	5	3	1	2	1	11	0	149	7

=== International ===
As of match played 17 November 2026

Appearances and goals by national team and year
National team	Year	Apps	Goals
Bosnia and Herzegovina
Bosnia and Herzegovina	2024	4	0
Bosnia and Herzegovina	2025	6	1
Bosnia and Herzegovina	2026	12	1
Total		22	2

Scores and results list Bosnia and Herzegovina's goal tally first, score column indicates score after each Muharemović goal.

List of international goals scored by Tarik Muharemović
No.	Date	Venue	Cap	Opponent	Score	Result	Competition
1	10 June 2025	Z'dežele, Celje, Slovenia	6	Slovenia	1–2	1–2	Friendly
2	28 September 2026	Arena Națională, Bucharest, Romania	19	Romania	2–0	4–2	2026–27 UEFA Nations League B

== Honours ==
Sassuolo

- Serie B: 2024–25
