= Nikola Sekulov =

Italian footballer (born 2002)

Personal information
- Date of birth: 18 February 2002 (age 24)
- Place of birth: Piacenza, Italy
- Height: 1.85 m (6 ft 1 in)
- Position: Midfielder

Team information
- Current team: Sampdoria
- Number: 18

Youth career
- 2007–2012: Piacenza
- 2012–2015: Parma
- 2015–2016: Pro Piacenza
- 2016–2021: Juventus

Senior career*
Years	Team	Apps	(Gls)
2020–2025	Juventus	1	(0)
2020–2023	→ Juventus Next Gen (Note: The team's name was changed from Juventus U23 to Juventus Next Gen in August 2022.) (res.)	64	(8)
2023–2024	→ Cremonese (loan)	1	(0)
2024	→ Juventus Next Gen (res.)	17	(6)
2024–2025	→ Sampdoria (loan)	16	(1)
2025–	Sampdoria	0	(0)
2025–2026	→ Carrarese (loan)	17	(0)

International career
2017	Macedonia U17	2	(0)
2018–2019	Italy U17	10	(0)
2019–2020	Italy U18	6	(0)
2021–2022	Italy U20	8	(1)
Medal record
Men's football
Representing Italy
UEFA European Under-17 Championship
Silver medal – second place	2019 Republic of Ireland
- * Club domestic league appearances and goals as of 13 May 2026

Nikola Sekulov (Macedonian: Никола Секулов; born 18 February 2002) is an Italian professional footballer who plays as a midfielder for Serie B club Sampdoria. Born in Italy, Sekulov represented Macedonia internationally at youth level, before switching to Italy in 2018.

== Club career ==
Born in Piacenza, Italy, to Macedonian parents, Sekulov began his youth career at Piacenza in 2007, remaining there until 2012 when he moved to Parma. In 2015 he joined Pro Piacenza, before moving to Juventus in 2016.

Sekulov made his Serie C debut for Juventus U23 – the reserve team of Juventus – on 21 October 2020 in a 1–0 defeat to Pro Vercelli. On 22 September 2021, Sekulov scored his first goal in his career in a 2–1 win against Triestina. On 17 October, Sekulov scored a brace in a 2–1 win against Seregno. On 29 October, Sekulov extended his contract with Juventus until 2025.

On 7 December 2022, Sekulov scored Juventus Next Gen's 2–0 in their victory against Padova in Coppa Italia Serie C after carrying the ball from his own half. On 15 July 2023, he joined Serie B side Cremonese on loan. On 12 January 2024, the loan was terminated early. On 30 March, he made his first-team debut, entering the field in the final minutes of a 1–0 away defeat to Lazio. He became the first player to play in the Serie A, in Serie B and in Serie C in the same season. On 11 May 2024, Sekulov and Simone Guerra simultaneously became Juventus Next Gen's best goalscorers with 17 goals each upon scoring in an away Serie C promotion play-off match won 3–1 against Pescara.

On 14 August 2024, Sekulov joined Sampdoria on loan with an obligation to buy.

On 29 August 2025, Sekulov was loaned by Carrarese of Serie B, with an option to buy.

== International career ==
Sekulov represented Macedonia internationally at youth level until the under-17s, switching allegiance to Italy in 2018. He represented the under-17s at the 2019 UEFA European Under-17 Championship, reaching the final of the competition where Italy lost to the Netherlands.

== Style of play ==
A half-winger (Italian: mezz'ala), Sekulov has been likened to former Juventus midfielder Claudio Marchisio for his technical qualities, movements, and height.

== Career statistics ==
=== Club ===
As of match played 29 March 2025

Appearances and goals by club, season and competition
Club	Season	League			Coppa Italia		Other		Total	
Club	Season	Division	Apps	Goals	Apps	Goals	Apps	Goals	Apps	Goals
Juventus Next Gen	2020–21	Serie C	3	0	—		—		3	0
Juventus Next Gen	2021–22	Serie C	33	4	3 (Note: Appearances in Coppa Italia Serie C)	0	5 (Note: Appearances in Serie C – Promotion play-offs)	0	41	4
Juventus Next Gen	2022–23	Serie C	28	4	8	2	—		36	6
Juventus Next Gen	2023–24	Serie C	17	6	—		6	3	23	9
Juventus Next Gen	Total		81	14	11	2	11	3	103	19
Cremonese (loan)	2023–24	Serie B	1	0	2	0	—		3	0
Juventus	2023–24	Serie A	1	0	0	0	—		1	0
Sampdoria (loan)	2024–25	Serie B	16	1	2	0	—		18	1
Career total			99	15	15	2	11	3	125	20

== Honours ==
Juventus Next Gen

- Coppa Italia Serie C runner-up: 2022–23

Italy U17

- UEFA European Under-17 Championship runner-up: 2019
