= Samuel Mbangula =

Belgian footballer (born 2004)

Personal information
- Full name: Samuel-Germain Kinduelu Mbangula Tshifunda
- Date of birth: 16 January 2004 (age 22)
- Place of birth: Brussels, Belgium
- Height: 1.81 m (5 ft 11 in)
- Position: Winger

Team information
- Current team: Bologna (on loan from Werder Bremen)
- Number: 11

Youth career
- 2014–2019: Club Brugge
- 2019–2020: Anderlecht
- 2020–2023: Juventus

Senior career*
Years	Team	Apps	(Gls)
2023–2024	Juventus Next Gen	17	(1)
2024–2025	Juventus	23	(3)
2025–	Werder Bremen	26	(3)
2026–	→ Bologna (loan)	5	(3)

International career^{‡}
2019	Belgium U15	2	(0)
2019	Belgium U17	6	(4)
2021–2022	Belgium U18	10	(1)
2022–2023	Belgium U19	5	(0)
2023–	Belgium U21	17	(0)
- * Club domestic league appearances and goals as of 20:00, 4 November 2026 (UTC) ‡ National team caps and goals as of 15:30, 18 November 2026 (UTC)

Samuel-Germain Kinduelu Mbangula Tshifunda (born 16 January 2004) is a Belgian professional footballer who plays as a winger for Serie A club Bologna, on loan from Bundesliga club Werder Bremen.

== Early life ==
Born in Brussels, Belgium, Mbangula is of DR Congolese descent.

== Club career ==
=== Early career ===
Having begun his youth career at Club Brugge, with whom he spent five years, Mbangula moved to Anderlecht in summer 2019.

=== Juventus ===
On 10 August 2020, Mbangula joined the under-17 team of Italian side Juventus. In 2022, Mbangula signed a four-year contract with Juventus. After having played for the under-19s, he was made part of Juventus' reserve team in Serie C, Juventus Next Gen, during the 2023–24 season.

On 19 August 2024, Mbangula made his debut for Juventus in the first matchday of the 2024–25 Serie A season, scoring in a 3–0 win against Como; he was nominated man of the match. Not long after, he scored his first Champions League goal on the 11th of February against PSV Eindhoven the next year.

=== Werder Bremen ===
On 23 July 2025, Mbangula moved to Bundesliga club Werder Bremen. The transfer fee paid to Juventus was reported as €10 million plus bonuses, the second-highest fee Werder Bremen has paid in its history.

==== Loan to Bologna ====
On 1 September 2026, Mbangula joined Serie A side Bologna on loan for the 2026–27 season. According to Italian sports journalist Fabrizio Romano, Bologna paid a €2 million loan fee to Werder Bremen and secured an option to sign Mbangula permanently for €12.5 million. A month later, on 28 October, he scored his first goals for the club, netting a hat-trick in a 4–2 away win over AC Milan.

== International career ==
In November 2024, Mbangula was called up to the senior Belgium squad for the 2024–25 UEFA Nations League matches against Italy and Israel on 14 and 17 November 2024, respectively.

== Style of play ==
Mbangula is a rapid offensive winger.

== Career statistics ==
As of match played 31 October 2026

Appearances and goals by club, season and competition
Club	Season	League			National cup (Note: Includes Coppa Italia Serie C, Coppa Italia, DFB-Pokal)		Europe		Other		Total	
Club	Season	Division	Apps	Goals	Apps	Goals	Apps	Goals	Apps	Goals	Apps	Goals
Juventus Next Gen	2023–24	Serie C	17	1	2	0	—		6 (Note: Appearances in Serie C promotion play-offs)	1	25	2
Juventus	2024–25	Serie A	23	3	1	0	7 (Note: Appearances in UEFA Champions League)	1	1 (Note: Appearance in Supercoppa Italiana)	0	32	4
Werder Bremen	2025–26	Bundesliga	26	3	1	0	—		—		27	3
Werder Bremen	2026–27	Bundesliga	0	0	1	0	—		—		1	0
Werder Bremen	Total		26	3	2	0	—		—		28	3
Bologna (loan)	2026–27	Serie A	5	3	0	0	—		—		5	3
Career total			71	10	5	0	7	1	7	1	90	12
