= Leonardo Cerri =

Italian footballer (born 2003)

Personal information
- Date of birth: 4 March 2003 (age 23)
- Place of birth: Rome, Italy
- Height: 1.98 m (6 ft 6 in)
- Position: Striker

Team information
- Current team: Grenoble

Youth career
- –2015: Atletico Torrino (futsal)
- 2015–2016: Lupa Roma
- 2016–2017: Unicusano Fondi
- 2017–2019: Pescara
- 2019–2022: Juventus

Senior career*
Years	Team	Apps	(Gls)
2021–2025	Juventus Next Gen (Note: The team's name was changed from Juventus U23 to Juventus Next Gen in August 2022.)	53	(10)
2024–2026	Juventus	1	(0)
2024–2025	→ Carrarese (loan)	33	(4)
2025–2026	→ Bari (loan)	10	(1)
2026	→ Juventus Next Gen (res.)	10	(2)
2026–	Grenoble	0	(0)

International career^{‡}
2022	Italy U20	1	(0)
2024	Italy U21	4	(1)
- * Club domestic league appearances and goals as of 30 April 2026 ‡ National team caps and goals as of 19:04, 30 September 2022 (UTC)

Leonardo Cerri (born 4 March 2003) is an Italian professional footballer who plays as a striker for Ligue 2 club Grenoble.

== Club career ==
=== Early career ===
Born in Rome, Italy, Cerri began his youth career playing futsal at Atletico Torrino, before joining Lupa Roma in 2015. After one year, he moved to Unicusano Fondi and, in summer 2017, he joined Pescara. In the 2018–19 season, Cerri scored 14 goals with Pescara's under-16s; he also played three games with the under-17s at the end of the season, scoring just a single goal.

=== Juventus ===
On 2 July 2019, Cerri joined Juventus in a transfer worth €1.1 million, with Pescara having 50% of his future sale. He played for the under-17s in the 2019–20 season, scoring 12 goals in 17 games. In 2020–21, Cerri was moved to the under-19s, playing in the Campionato Primavera 1.

On 24 January 2021, Cerri scored on his debut for Juventus U23s – the reserve team of Juventus – in the Serie C, coming on as a substitute and scoring the equalizer in a 1–1 draw against Pro Sesto. He also scored a disallowed goal in the 90+5th minute. Cerri made three further appearances for the under-23s in 2020–21, as well as two in 2021–22. In the 2021–22 season, he scored nine goals in 27 appearances (including 13 as a substitute) for Juventus U19s, also helping the team to reach the semi-finals, their best-ever placing in the competition.

On 6 July 2022, he signed a new contract for Juventus after the previous had expired six days earlier. On 7 December, he scored Juventus Next Gen's opener in their 2–1 win to Padova in the Coppa Italia Serie C.

On 12 February 2024, Cerri made his Serie A debut in Juventus's 1–0 defeat to Udinese as an 84th-minute substitute.

==== Loan to Carrarese ====
On 1 August 2024, Cerri was loaned to Serie B club Carrarese.

==== Loan to Bari ====
On 27 August 2024, he was sent on a one-year loan to Bari in Serie B.

=== Grenoble ===
On 3 August 2026, French Ligue 2 side Grenoble announced the signing of Cerri on a permanent deal.

== International career ==
In June 2024, Cerri took part in the Maurice Revello Tournament with Italy U21s. He played four out of the five games; he also scored the winning goal in the third-place match against France.

== Style of play ==
Cerri has been likened to Italian former footballer Luca Toni for his movement, positioning, and height. At 1.98 m (6 ft 6 in), Cerri is a tall, left-footed striker, whose main characteristics are his physical presence in the box and his heading.

== Career statistics ==
=== Club ===
As of match played 8 February 2026

Appearances and goals by club, season and competition
Club	Season	League			Coppa Italia		Other		Total	
Club	Season	Division	Apps	Goals	Apps	Goals	Apps	Goals	Apps	Goals
Juventus Next Gen	2020–21	Serie C	4	1	—		0	0	4	1
Juventus Next Gen	2021–22	Serie C	2	0	—		0	0	2	0
Juventus Next Gen	2022–23	Serie C	17	3	—		3 (Note: Appearance(s) in Coppa Italia Serie C)	1	20	4
Juventus Next Gen	2023–24	Serie C	30	6	—		5 (Note: One appearance in Coppa Italia Serie C, and six appearances in Serie C promotion play-offs)	2 (Note: Two goals in Serie C promotion play-offs)	35	8
Juventus Next Gen	Total		53	10	—		8	3	61	13
Juventus	2023–24	Serie A	1	0	0	0	—		1	0
Carrarese (loan)	2024–25	Serie B	31	3	2	1	—		33	4
Bari	2025–26	Serie B	10	1	—		—		10	1
Juventus Next Gen	2025–26	Serie C	1	1	—		—		1	1
Career total			55	11	2	1	8	3	96	19
