= Tommaso Mancini =

Italian footballer (born 2004)

Personal information
- Date of birth: 23 July 2004 (age 22)
- Place of birth: Vicenza, Italy
- Height: 1.93 m (6 ft 4 in)
- Position: Centre-forward

Team information
- Current team: Livorno (on loan from Juventus)
- Number: 14

Youth career
- –2022: Vicenza
- 2022–2025: Juventus

Senior career*
Years	Team	Apps	(Gls)
2020–2022	Vicenza	13	(0)
2022–	Juventus	0	(0)
2022–2025	→ Juventus Next Gen (res.)	24	(0)
2025–2026	→ Virtus Verona (loan)	28	(1)
2026–	→ Livorno (loan)	2	(0)

International career^{‡}
2019	Italy U15	7	(4)
2019–2020	Italy U16	12	(8)
2021–2022	Italy U18	7	(1)
2021–2023	Italy U19	13	(3)
Medal record
Representing Italy
Mediterranean Games
Runner-up	Oran 2022	U-18 Team
- * Club domestic league appearances and goals as of 29 August 2026 ‡ National team caps and goals as of 18 January 2023

Tommaso Mancini (born 23 July 2004) is an Italian professional footballer who plays as a centre-forward for Serie C Group B club Livorno on loan from Juventus.

== Club career ==
=== Vicenza ===
Born in Vicenza, Mancini progressed through the youth ranks at the city's main club, where he signed his first professional contract in July 2020, penning a three-year deal. In the meantime, the forward also started training with the first team, under manager Domenico Di Carlo, and featured for Lega Pro's under-15 national team.

On 30 September 2020, Mancini made his senior debut for Vicenza, playing the first half of the Coppa Italia game against Pro Patria, which ended in a 3–2 win after extra time for his side. At 16 years and 67 days, he became the club's second youngest player ever, behind only Nicola Rigoni (who had debuted at 16 years and 60 days). On 4 January 2021, the forward made his league debut, coming on as a substitute for Stefano Giacomelli in the 80th minute of the Serie B match against Brescia, which ended in a 3–0 away win for his team. At 16 years and 162 days, he became the youngest player to ever feature in a Serie B match. Throughout the season, Mancini made four more senior appearances, including a start. In the following campaign, the forward saw his playing time limited by injuries and tactical decisions: in the end, he gained a total amount of nine senior appearances, as Vicenza eventually faced relegation from the second tier.

=== Juventus ===
In the summer of 2022, Mancini attracted interest from several high-profile Italian and European teams: after starting the pre-season at Vicenza, and failing to agree personal terms with Milan, he eventually joined Juventus on a permanent deal, with the estimated transfer fee being between €2 million and €2.5 million.

Mancini was initially assigned to the club's under-19 squad, where he impressed with his performances in the Campionato Primavera and the UEFA Youth League. On 7 December 2022, the centre-forward made his debut for Juventus Next Gen, coming on as a substitute in the second half of the Coppa Italia Serie C match against Padova.

== International career ==
Mancini has represented Italy at various youth international levels.

After featuring for the under-15 national team for the first time in March 2019, he went on to play for the under-16, under-18 and under-19 national teams in the following years.

The forward was included in the under-18 squad that took part in the 2022 Mediterranean Games in Oran, as the Azzurrini eventually won the silver medal after losing to France (1–0) in the tournament's final match.

Both in May and December 2022, he took part in training camps at Coverciano with the Italian senior national team, led by the head coach Roberto Mancini.

== Style of play ==
Mancini has been described as a complete centre-forward, who can play either as a standalone target man or in an attacking duo. Despite being naturally right-footed, he can also use his left foot as effectively. Thanks to his height and his physique, he excels in heading and defending possession: however, he can also take on his opponent with his technical skills and his athleticism. Moreover, he has been regarded for his coordination, his off-the-ball movement and his finishing prowess, which provide him with a wide variety of options to find the net through, including acrobatic strikes and free kicks.

Due to his characteristics, he has been compared to Zlatan Ibrahimović.

== Career statistics ==
=== Club ===
As of match played 7 May 2025

Appearances and goals by club, season and competition
Club	Season	League			National Cup		Continental		Other		Total	
Club	Season	Division	Apps	Goals	Apps	Goals	Apps	Goals	Apps	Goals	Apps	Goals
Vicenza	2020–21	Serie B	5	0	1	0	—		—		6	0
Vicenza	2021–22	Serie B	8	0	1	0	—		—		9	0
Vicenza	2022–23	Serie C	0	0	0	0	—		0	0	0	0
Vicenza	Total		13	0	2	0	0	0	0	0	15	0
Juventus	2022–23	Serie A	0	0	0	0	0	0	—		0	0
Juventus	Total		0	0	0	0	0	0	0	0	0	0
Juventus Next Gen	2022–23	Serie C	2	0	—		—		1 (Note: Appearances in Coppa Italia Serie C)	0	3	0
Juventus Next Gen	2023–24	Serie C	11	0	—		—		1 (Note: Appearances in Coppa Italia Serie C)	3	12	3
Juventus Next Gen	2024–25	Serie C	11	0	—		—		2 (Note: Appearances in Coppa Italia Serie C)	0	13	0
Juventus Next Gen	Total		24	0	0	0	0	0	4	3	28	3
Career total			37	0	2	0	0	0	4	3	43	3
