= Gabriele Mulazzi =

Italian footballer (born 2003)

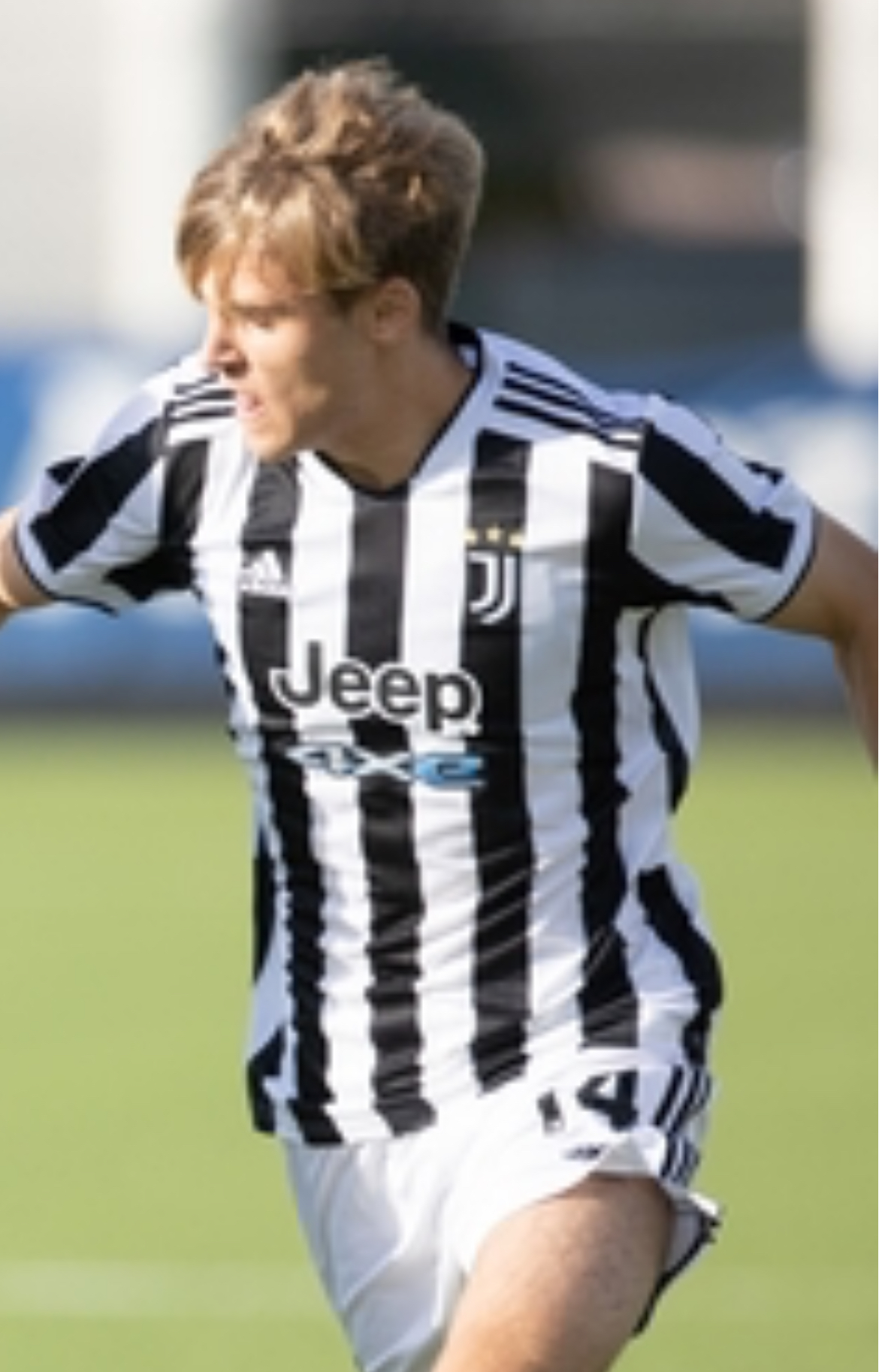
- Mulazzi with Juventus in 2021

Personal information
- Date of birth: 1 April 2003 (age 23)
- Place of birth: Turin, Italy
- Height: 1.80 m (5 ft 11 in)
- Position: Full-back

Team information
- Current team: Sion

Youth career
- 2015‒2018: Torino
- 2018‒2022: Juventus

Senior career*
| Years | Team | Apps | (Gls) |
| 2022‒2025 | Juventus Next Gen | 56 | (0) |
| 2025– | Sion U21 | 2 | (0) |
| 2025– | Sion | 0 | (0) |
| 2026 | → Juventus Next Gen (loan) | 5 | (0) |

International career^{‡}
| 2018 | Italy U15 | 5 | (0) |
| 2018‒2019 | Italy U16 | 9 | (0) |
| 2019 | Italy U17 | 5 | (0) |
| 2021 | Italy U18 | 1 | (0) |
| 2021–2022 | Italy U19 | 8 | (0) |
| 2022 | Italy U20 | 3 | (0) |
- * Club domestic league appearances and goals as of 30 April 2026 ‡ National team caps and goals as of 19:07, 21 November 2022 (UTC)

Gabriele Mulazzi (born 1 April 2003) is an Italian professional footballer who plays as a full-back for Swiss Super League club Sion.

== Club career ==
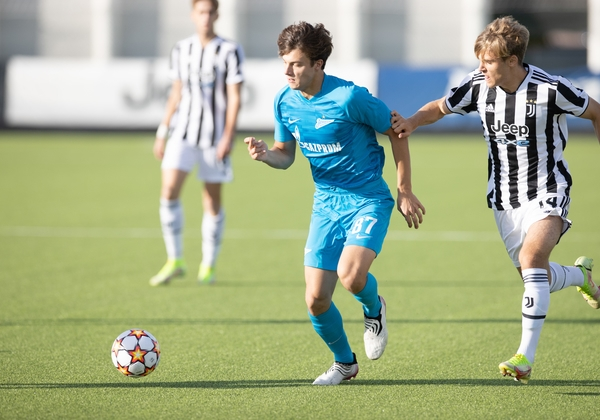
Mulazzi (right) in action for Juventus U19

Mulazzi started playing football aged five in an amateur club situated in Settimo Torinese. He then moved to Torino's youth setup where he stayed for three years, when he moved to Juventus'. He spent his whole youth career at Juventus across all of their youth squads. On 23 September 2020, he signed his first contract with Juventus, which would expire in 2023. On 2 April 2021, he was first called up by Juventus U23 (Note: The team's name was changed from Juventus U23 to Juventus Next Gen in August 2022.) alongside his U19 teammate Samuel Iling-Junior for a Serie C match against Alessandria.

In the 2021–22 season, spent with the under-19s, Mulazzi scored seven goals and gave eight assists in all competitions. Despite being listed as a right-back, he played 27 of his 36 season matches as a midfielder. He helped the U19s reach the 2021–22 UEFA Youth League semifinals, their best-ever placing in the competition.

He made his professional debut on 3 September 2022, in a 2–0 win against Trento, playing for Juventus Next Gen. On 20 December, Mulazzi renewed with Juventus Next Gen until 2026.

On 17 February 2025, Mulazzi signed a two-and-a-half-year contract with Sion in Switzerland. He was initially assigned to the club's reserve (or Under-21) team that plays in the fourth-tier 1. Liga.

== Style of play ==
As a kid, Mulazzi was a forward. He is currently a full-back who can play as a winger.

== Career statistics ==
As of match played 12 March 2023

Appearances and goals by club, season and competition
| Club | Season | League | | | Coppa Italia | | Other | | Total | |
| Club | Season | Division | Apps | Goals | Apps | Goals | Apps | Goals | Apps | Goals |
|---|---|---|---|---|---|---|---|---|---|---|
| Juventus Next Gen | 2022–23 | Serie C | 23 | 0 | — | | 4 (Note: Appearances in Coppa Italia Serie C) | 0 | 27 | 0 |
| Career total | | | 23 | 0 | 0 | 0 | 4 | 0 | 27 | 0 |
