= Riccardo Turicchia =

Italian footballer (born 2003)

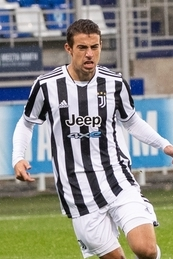
- Turicchia with Juventus U19 in 2021

Personal information
- Full name: Riccardo Turicchia
- Date of birth: 5 February 2003 (age 23)
- Place of birth: Imola, Italy
- Height: 1.84 m (6 ft 0 in)
- Position: Left-back

Team information
- Current team: Virtus Entella
- Number: 46

Youth career
- –2011: Borgo Tossignano
- 2011–2014: Imolese
- 2014–2018: Cesena
- 2018–2022: Juventus

Senior career*
| Years | Team | Apps | (Gls) |
| 2021–2026 | Juventus Next Gen (Note: The team's name was changed from Juventus U23 to Juventus Next Gen in August 2022.) | 82 | (5) |
| 2024–2025 | → Catanzaro (loan) | 1 | (0) |
| 2026– | Virtus Entella | 8 | (0) |

International career^{‡}
| 2019–2020 | Italy U17 | 3 | (0) |
| 2021 | Italy U18 | 1 | (0) |
| 2021–2022 | Italy U19 | 10 | (0) |
| 2022–2023 | Italy U20 | 9 | (0) |
| 2023–2025 | Italy U21 | 11 | (0) |
Medal record
Men's football
Representing Italy
FIFA U-20 World Cup
| Runner-up | 2023 Argentina |
- * Club domestic league appearances and goals as of 13 May 2026 ‡ National team caps and goals as of 22 June 2025

Riccardo Turicchia (born 5 February 2003) is an Italian professional footballer who plays as left-back for Serie B club Virtus Entella.

== Club career ==
Turicchia began playing youth football for local club Borgo Tossignano, and Casalfiumanese before joining Imolese, where he played for three years. In 2014, he moved to Cesena, before joining Juventus' youth setup.

On 9 October 2021, Turicchia made his unofficial debut for Juventus in a 2–1 home win against Alessandria coming on as substitute in the 63rd minute. On 24 October, Turicchia made his professional debut for Juventus U23—the reserve team of Juventus—in a 1–1 home draw against Pro Sesto, coming on as substitute in the 84th minute. He spent the 2021–22 season playing for Juventus U19, scoring eight goals in 39 matches, and helped the U19s reach the UEFA Youth League semifinals, their best-ever placing in the competition.

On 8 November, he renewed his contract with Juventus until June 2025.

On 31 July 2024, he moved to Catanzaro on loan.

On 16 January 2025, he returned to Juventus Next Gen.

On 13 January 2026, Turicchia signed with Virtus Entella in Serie B.

== International career ==
In May 2023, Turicchia was included in the Italian under-20 squad that took part in the FIFA U-20 World Cup in Argentina, where the Azzurrini finished runners-up after losing to Uruguay in the final match.

== Style of play ==
Turicchia's usual role is left back, but he also played several times as left winger and central midfielder.

== Career statistics ==
As of match played 16 April 2023

Appearances and goals by club, season and competition
| Club | Season | League | | | National cup (Note: Includes Coppa Italia) | | Other | | Total | |
| Club | Season | Division | Apps | Goals | Apps | Goals | Apps | Goals | Apps | Goals |
|---|---|---|---|---|---|---|---|---|---|---|
| Juventus Next Gen | 2021–22 | Serie C | 2 | 0 | — | | 0 | 0 | 2 | 0 |
| Juventus Next Gen | 2022–23 | Serie C | 19 | 0 | — | | 1 (Note: Appearance in Coppa Italia Serie C) | 0 | 20 | 0 |
| Juventus Next Gen | Total | | 21 | 0 | 0 | 0 | 1 | 0 | 22 | 0 |
| Career total | | | 21 | 0 | 0 | 0 | 1 | 0 | 22 | 0 |

=== International ===
As of match played 26 March 2022

Appearances and goals by national team, year and competition
| Team | Year | Competitive | | Friendly | | Total | |
| Team | Year | Apps | Goals | Apps | Goals | Apps | Goals |
|---|---|---|---|---|---|---|---|
| Italy U17 | 2019 | — | | 2 | 0 | 2 | 0 |
| Italy U17 | 2020 | — | | 1 | 0 | 1 | 0 |
| Italy U17 | Total | 0 | 0 | 3 | 0 | 3 | 0 |
| Italy U18 | 2021 | — | | 1 | 0 | 1 | 0 |
| Italy U18 | Total | 0 | 0 | 1 | 0 | 1 | 0 |
| Italy U19 | 2021 | — | | 4 | 0 | 4 | 0 |
| Italy U19 | 2022 | 2 | 0 | 1 | 0 | 3 | 0 |
| Italy U19 | Total | 2 | 0 | 5 | 0 | 7 | 0 |
| Career total | | 2 | 0 | 9 | 0 | 11 | 0 |

== Honours ==
Italy U20

- FIFA U-20 World Cup runner-up: 2023
