= 2016–17 Delfino Pescara 1936 season =

Pescara
2016–17 season
- President: Daniele Sebastiani
- Manager: Massimo Oddo (until 14 February 2017); Luciano Zauri (from 14 February 2017 to 17 February 2017); Zdeněk Zeman (from 17 February 2017)
- Stadium: Stadio Adriatico – Giovanni Cornacchia
- Serie A: 20th
- Coppa Italia: Fourth round
- Top goalscorer: League: Gianluca Caprari (9); All: Gianluca Caprari (9)
- Highest home attendance: 20,088 vs Internazionale (11 September 2016, Serie A)
- Lowest home attendance: 5,410 vs Frosinone (13 August 2016, Coppa Italia)
- Average home league attendance: 13,543
Home colours	Away colours	Third colours

The 2016–17 season was Delfino Pescara 1936's first season in the top-flight of Italian football after the club's relegation to Serie B at the end of the 2012–13 season. Pescara suffered a miserable campaign, languishing in the relegation places for the entire season and finishing 20th with only 18 points, 3 wins (one of those awarded), and 81 goals conceded. The club were eliminated in the Coppa Italia fourth round by Atalanta.

== Players ==
=== Squad information ===
Players and squad numbers last updated on 22 August 2016.
Note: Flags indicate national team as has been defined under FIFA eligibility rules. Players may hold more than one non-FIFA nationality.

No.	Name	Nat	Position(s)	Date of Birth (Age)	Signed in	Contract until	Signed from	Transfer Fee	Notes
Goalkeepers
1	Vincenzo Fiorillo	(Italy)	GK	13 January 1993 (age 33)	2014	2019	(Italy) Juventus	€1M	
12	Gabriele Aldegani	(Italy)	GK	10 May 1976 (age 49)	2014	2017	(Italy) Nocerina	Free	
18	Simone Aresti	(Italy)	GK	15 March 1986 (age 40)	2014	2017	(Italy) Savona	Free	
22	Mirko Pigliacelli	(Italy)	GK	30 June 1993 (age 32)	2015	2017	(Italy) Frosinone	Free	
31	Albano Bizzarri	(Argentina)	GK	9 November 1977 (age 48)	2016	2017	(Italy) Chievo	Free	
Defenders
2	Alessandro Crescenzi	(Italy)	LB	24 September 1991 (age 34)	2015	2019	(Italy) Roma	€0.3M	
3	Cristiano Biraghi	(Italy)	LB	1 September 1992 (age 33)	2016	2020	(Italy) Internazionale	€4M	
11	Francesco Zampano	(Italy)	RB	30 September 1993 (age 32)	2014	2020	(Italy) Hellas Verona	€0.8M	
13	Dario Župarić	(Croatia)	CB	3 May 1990 (age 35)	2013	2018	(Croatia) Cibalia	€0.7M	
14	Hugo Campagnaro	(Argentina)	CB	27 June 1980 (age 45)	2015	2017	(Italy) Internazionale	Free	
23	Leonardo Maloku	(Albania)	RB	18 May 1998 (age 27)	2016	2012	(Italy) Youth Academy	N/A	
26	Davide Vitturini	(Italy)	RB	21 February 1997 (age 29)	2014	2021	(Italy) Youth Academy	N/A	
35	Andrea Coda	(Italy)	CB	25 April 1985 (age 41)	2016	2017	(Italy) Sampdoria	€0.2M	
37	Norbert Gyömbér	(Slovakia)	CB	3 July 1992 (age 33)	2016	2017	(Italy) Roma	N/A	On loan
44	Michele Fornasier	(Italy)	CB	22 August 1993 (age 32)	2015	2020	(Italy) Sampdoria	Free	
Midfielders
5	Alessandro Bruno	(Italy)	CM	4 July 1983 (age 42)	2015	2017	(Italy) Latina	Undisclosed	
6	Bryan Cristante	(Italy)	CM	3 March 1995 (age 31)	2016	2017	(Portugal) Benfica	On loan	
7	Valerio Verre	(Italy)	CM	11 January 1994 (age 32)	2015	2020	(Italy) Udinese	€4M	
8	Ledian Memushaj	(Albania)	CM	7 December 1986 (age 39)	2014	2019	(Italy) Lecce	€0.2M	Captain
10	Ahmad Benali	(Libya)	CM	7 February 1992 (age 34)	2015	2019	(Italy) Palermo	€1M	
16	Gastón Brugman	(Uruguay)	DM	7 September 1992 (age 33)	2012	2019	(Italy) Empoli	Undisclosed	
20	Alberto Aquilani	(Italy)	CM	7 July 1984 (age 41)	2016	2017	(Portugal) Sporting CP	Free	
24	Ransford Selasi	(Ghana)	CM	19 February 1996 (age 30)	2014	2020	(Italy) Youth Academy	N/A	
28	Alexandru Mitriță	(Romania)	AM	8 February 1995 (age 31)	2015	2019	(Romania) Viitorul Constanța	€0.8M	
98	Ferdinando Del Sole	(Italy)	AM	17 January 1998 (age 28)	2016	2017	(Italy) Youth Academy	N/A	
Forwards
9	Rey Manaj	(Albania)	ST / CF	24 February 1997 (age 29)	2016	2017	(Italy) Internazionale	On loan	
15	Jean-Christophe Bahebeck	(France)	LW	1 May 1993 (age 32)	2016	2017	(France) Paris Saint-Germain	On loan	
17	Gianluca Caprari	(Italy)	SS	30 July 1993 (age 32)	2016	2017	(Italy) Internazionale	On loan	
21	Simone Pepe	(Italy)	RW	30 August 1983 (age 42)	2016	2017	(Italy) Chievo	Free	
27	Stefano Pettinari	(Italy)	ST / CF	27 January 1992 (age 34)	2016	2019	(Italy) Roma	Free	
30	Robert Murić	(Croatia)	RW	12 March 1996 (age 30)	2016	2017	(Netherlands) Ajax	On loan	
52	Francesco Nicastro	(Italy)	ST / CF	26 October 1991 (age 34)	2016	2018	(Italy) Juve Stabia	Free	

== Transfers ==
=== In ===
Date	Pos.	Player	Age	Moving from	Fee	Notes	Source
12 June 2016	MF	(Libya) Ahmad Benali	24	(Italy) Palermo	€1M		
12 June 2016	GK	(Italy) Vincenzo Fiorillo	23	(Italy) Juventus	€1M		
25 June 2016	MF	(Italy) Valerio Verre	22	(Italy) Udinese	€4M		
1 July 2016	DF	(Italy) Andrea Coda	31	(Italy) Sampdoria	€0.2M		
1 July 2016	DF	(Italy) Antonio Mazzotta	26	(Italy) Cesena	€0.3M		
6 July 2016	GK	(Argentina) Albano Bizzarri	38	(Italy) Chievo	Free		
8 July 2016	FW	(Italy) Alessio Di Massimo	20	(Italy) Sant'Omero	€0.3M		
11 July 2016	DF	(Italy) Cristiano Biraghi	23	(Italy) Internazionale	€4M		
13 July 2016	DF	(Italy) Alessandro Crescenzi	24	(Italy) Roma	€0.3M		
23 August 2016	FW	(Italy) Simone Pepe	32	(Italy) Chievo	Free		
26 August 2016	MF	(Italy) Alberto Aquilani	32	(Portugal) Sporting CP	Free		

==== Loans in ====
Date	Pos.	Player	Age	Moving from	Fee	Notes	Source
22 August 2016	FW	(France) Jean-Christophe Bahebeck	23	(France) Paris Saint-Germain	Loan		
23 August 2016	FW	(Croatia) Robert Murić	20	(Netherlands) Ajax	Loan		

=== Out ===
Date	Pos.	Player	Age	Moving to	Fee	Notes	Source

==== Loans out ====
Date	Pos.	Player	Age	Moving to	Fee	Notes	Source

== Competitions ==
=== Overall ===
Competition	Started round	Current position	Final position	First match	Last match
Serie A	Matchday 1	—	20th	21 August 2016	28 May 2017
Coppa Italia	Third round	—	Fourth round	13 August 2016	30 November 2016

Last updated: 28 May 2017

=== Serie A ===
==== League table ====
Pos	Team	Pld	W	D	L	GF	GA	GD	Pts	Qualification or relegation
16	Genoa	38	9	9	20	38	64	−26	36	
17	Crotone	38	9	7	22	34	58	−24	34	
18	Empoli (R)	38	8	8	22	29	61	−32	32	Relegation to Serie B
19	Palermo (R)	38	6	8	24	33	77	−44	26	Relegation to Serie B
20	Pescara (R)	38	3	9	26	37	81	−44	18	Relegation to Serie B

Source: Serie A, Soccerway
Rules for classification: 1) Points; 2) Head-to-head points; 3) Head-to-head goal difference; 4) Goal difference; 5) Goals scored; 6) Draw.
(R) Relegated

==== Results summary ====
Overall								Home						Away					
Pld	W	D	L	GF	GA	GD	Pts	W	D	L	GF	GA	GD	W	D	L	GF	GA	GD
38	3	9	26	37	81	−44	18	2	5	12	19	38	−19	1	4	14	18	43	−25

Last updated: 28 May 2017.
Source: Competitive matches

==== Results by round ====
Round	1	2	3	4	5	6	7	8	9	10	11	12	13	14	15	16	17	18	19	20	21	22	23	24	25	26	27	28	29	30	31	32	33	34	35	36	37	38
Ground	H	A	H	A	H	A	H	H	A	H	A	H	A	A	H	A	H	A	H	A	H	A	H	A	H	A	A	H	A	H	A	H	H	A	H	A	H	A
Result	D	W	L	L	D	D	L	D	L	L	L	L	L	L	D	L	L	D	L	L	L	L	L	L	W	L	L	L	L	D	D	L	L	L	L	L	W	D
Position	11	5	8	16	15	15	17	16	17	17	17	18	18	18	18	19	20	20	20	20	20	20	20	20	20	20	20	20	20	20	20	20	20	20	20	20	20	20

Updated to match(es) played on 28 May 2017. Source: Competitive matches
A = Away; H = Home; W = Win; D = Draw; L = Loss

==== Matches ====
21 August 2016 1	Pescara	2–2	Napoli	Pescara
20:45 CEST (UTC+02:00)	Benali 8'; Caprari 35'; Brugman (yellow card) 47'; Bizzarri (yellow card) 52'; Gyömbér (yellow card) 74'	Report	Albiol (yellow card) 29'; Mertens 60', 63', (yellow card) 90+2'	Stadium: Stadio Adriatico – Giovanni Cornacchia; Attendance: 16,758; Referee: Piero Giacomelli

28 August 2016 2	Sassuolo	0–3 (Awarded)	Pescara	Reggio Emilia
20:45 CEST (UTC+02:00)	Acerbi (yellow card) 26'; Defrel 38'; Berardi 67'; Biondini (yellow card) 90+3'	Report	Brugman (yellow card) 36'; Campagnaro (yellow card) 69'; Manaj 81'	Stadium: Mapei Stadium – Città del Tricolore; Attendance: 9,071; Referee: Paolo Tagliavento

11 September 2016 3	Pescara	1–2	Internazionale	Pescara
20:45 CEST (UTC+02:00)	Gyömbér (yellow card) 20'; Bahebeck 63'	Report	João Mário (yellow card) 22'; Icardi 77', 90+1'	Stadium: Stadio Adriatico – Giovanni Cornacchia; Attendance: 20,088; Referee: Antonio Damato

17 September 2016 4	Lazio	3–0	Pescara	Rome
18:00 CEST (UTC+02:00)	Bastos (yellow card) 34'; Radu (yellow card) 49', (goal) 72'; Milinković-Savić 67'; Immobile 76'	Report	Campagnaro (yellow card) 17'; Verre (yellow card) 28'	Stadium: Stadio Olimpico; Attendance: 12,000; Referee: Fabio Maresca

21 September 2016 5	Pescara	0–0	Torino	Pescara
20:45 CEST (UTC+02:00)	Fornasier (yellow card) 41'; Biraghi (yellow card) 56'; Caprari (yellow card) 57'	Report	Acquah (yellow card) 26' (yellow-red card) 45'; Martínez (yellow card) 53'; Vives (red card) 78'; Hart (yellow card) 90+3'	Stadium: Stadio Adriatico – Giovanni Cornacchia; Attendance: 13,703; Referee: Luca Banti

25 September 2016 6	Genoa	1–1	Pescara	Genoa
15:00 CEST (UTC+02:00)	Simeone 47'; Edenílson (yellow card) 50' (yellow-red card) 74'; Gakpé (yellow card) 51'; Pandev (red card) 77'; Rigoni (yellow card) 85'	Report	Zampano (yellow card) 53'; Campagnaro (yellow card) 77'; Manaj 85', (yellow card) 90'	Stadium: Stadio Luigi Ferraris; Attendance: 19,717; Referee: Massimiliano Irrati

1 October 2016 7	Pescara	0–2	Chievo	Pescara
18:00 CEST (UTC+02:00)	Brugman (yellow card) 56'	Report	Frey (yellow card) 25'; Spolli (yellow card) 46'; Meggiorini 76'; Dainelli (yellow card) 79'; Inglese 85'	Stadium: Stadio Adriatico – Giovanni Cornacchia; Attendance: 13,782; Referee: Gianluca Manganiello

15 October 2016 8	Pescara	1–1	Sampdoria	Pescara
18:00 CEST (UTC+02:00)	Campagnaro 23'; Coda (yellow card) 30' (yellow-red card) 45'; Aquilani (yellow card) 39'	Report	Campagnaro 12' (o.g.); Viviano (yellow card) 76'	Stadium: Stadio Adriatico – Giovanni Cornacchia; Attendance: 13,307; Referee: Domenico Celi

23 October 2016 9	Udinese	3–1	Pescara	Udine
12:30 CEST (UTC+02:00)	Théréau 9' (pen.), 71', (yellow card) 34'; Karnezis (yellow card) 82'; Zapata 90+3' (pen.)	Report	Campagnaro (yellow card) 8'; Aquilani 74'	Stadium: Stadio Friuli; Attendance: 14,317; Referee: Gianluca Rocchi

26 October 2016 10	Pescara	0–1	Atalanta	Pescara
20:45 CEST (UTC+02:00)	Brugman (yellow card) 41'; Campagnaro (yellow card) 69'; Biraghi (yellow card) 75'	Report	Conti (yellow card) 19'; Konko (yellow card) 27'; Caldara 60'; Gagliardini (yellow card) 84'	Stadium: Stadio Adriatico – Giovanni Cornacchia; Attendance: 11,396; Referee: Marco Guida

30 October 2016 11	Milan	1–0	Pescara	Milan
15:00 CET (UTC+01:00)	Abate (yellow card) 41'; Bonaventura 49'	Report	Brugman (yellow card) 37'; Mitriță (yellow card) 48'	Stadium: San Siro; Attendance: 36,535; Referee: Daniele Doveri

6 November 2016 12	Pescara	0–4	Empoli	Pescara
12:30 CET (UTC+01:00)	Caprari (yellow card) 32'; Fornasier (yellow card) 68'	Report	Maccarone 12', 44'; Krunić (yellow card) 16'; Pucciarelli 23'; Saponara 89'; Dioussé (yellow card) 90+2'	Stadium: Stadio Adriatico – Giovanni Cornacchia; Attendance: 12,556; Referee: Daniele Orsato

19 November 2016 13	Juventus	3–0	Pescara	Turin
20:45 CET (UTC+01:00)	Khedira 36'; Mandžukić 63'; Hernanes 69'	Report	Crescenzi (yellow card) 45'; Bruno (yellow card) 87'	Stadium: Juventus Stadium; Attendance: 40,347; Referee: Michael Fabbri

27 November 2016 14	Roma	3–2	Pescara	Rome
20:45 CET (UTC+01:00)	Džeko 7', 10'; Rüdiger (yellow card) 32'; Nainggolan (yellow card) 39'; Emerson (yellow card) 62'; Perotti 71' (pen.)	Report	Biraghi (yellow card) 31'; Memushaj 60'; Župarić (yellow card) 67'; Caprari 74', (yellow card) 82'	Stadium: Stadio Olimpico; Attendance: 23,633; Referee: Massimiliano Irrati

4 December 2016 15	Pescara	1–1	Cagliari	Pescara
15:00 CET (UTC+01:00)	Memushaj (yellow card) 29'; Benali (yellow card) 39'; Caprari 90+2'	Report	Borriello 24', (yellow card) 73'; Di Gennaro (yellow card) 28' (yellow-red card) 34'; Dessena (yellow card) 30'	Stadium: Stadio Adriatico – Giovanni Cornacchia; Attendance: 11,575; Referee: Daniele Doveri

10 December 2016 16	Crotone	2–1	Pescara	Crotone
18:00 CET (UTC+01:00)	Palladino 24' (pen.); Capezzi (yellow card) 68' (yellow-red card) 80'; Falcinelli (yellow card) 75'; Ferrari 83'	Report	Gyömbér (yellow card) 18'; Aquilani (yellow card) 45+1' (yellow-red card) 73'; Manaj (yellow card) 66'; Campagnaro 82'; Zampano (yellow card) 83'	Stadium: Stadio Ezio Scida; Attendance: 7,470; Referee: Antonio Damato

18 December 2016 17	Pescara	0–3	Bologna	Pescara
15:00 CET (UTC+01:00)	Verre (red card) 16'; Biraghi (yellow card) 83'	Report	Masina 7'; Nagy (yellow card) 23'; Džemaili 41'; Krejčí 57' (pen.); Gastaldello (yellow card) 68'	Stadium: Stadio Adriatico – Giovanni Cornacchia; Attendance: 11,374; Referee: Gianluca Rocchi

22 December 2016 18	Palermo	1–1	Pescara	Palermo
20:45 CET (UTC+01:00)	Quaison 33'; Jajalo (yellow card) 39'; Nestorovski (yellow card) 42'; Henrique (yellow card) 76'; González (yellow card) 88'	Report	Pettinari (yellow card) 12'; Campagnaro (yellow card) 35'; Biraghi (yellow card) 70', (goal) 90+3' (pen.); Caprari (yellow card) 84'; Benali (yellow card) 87'	Stadium: Stadio Renzo Barbera; Attendance: 20,238; Referee: Davide Massa

15 January 2017 20	Napoli	3–1	Pescara	Naples
15:00 CET (UTC+01:00)	Tonelli (yellow card) 43', (goal) 47'; Hamšík 49'; Mertens 85'	Report	Coda (yellow card) 40'; Benali (yellow card) 44'; Bizzarri (yellow card) 54'; Caprari 90+4' (pen.)	Stadium: Stadio San Paolo; Attendance: 31,117; Referee: Claudio Gavillucci

22 January 2017 21	Pescara	1–3	Sassuolo	Pescara
15:00 CET (UTC+01:00)	Caprari (yellow card) 16'; Coda (yellow card) 20'; Bruno (yellow card) 44'; Bahebeck 56'; Cristante (yellow card) 84'	Report	Matri 1', 73', (yellow card) 25'; Berardi (yellow card) 39'; Pellegrini (yellow card) 44', (goal) 65'; Antei (yellow card) 89'; Politano (yellow card) 90'	Stadium: Stadio Adriatico – Giovanni Cornacchia; Attendance: 10,463; Referee: Paolo Valeri

28 January 2017 22	Internazionale	3–0	Pescara	Milan
20:45 CET (UTC+01:00)	D'Ambrosio 23'; João Mário 43'; Nagatomo (yellow card) 54'; Éder 73'	Report	Biraghi (yellow card) 67'	Stadium: San Siro; Attendance: 38,968; Referee: Gianpaolo Calvarese

1 February 2017 19	Pescara	1–2	Fiorentina	Pescara
20:45 CET (UTC+01:00)	Caprari 15'; Benali (yellow card) 34'; Gyömbér (yellow card) 53'; Biraghi (yellow card) 54'; Bruno (yellow card) 57'	Report	Tomović (yellow card) 17'; Vecino (yellow card) 38'; Badelj (yellow card) 50'; Tello 68', 90+5'	Stadium: Stadio Adriatico – Giovanni Cornacchia; Attendance: 12,885; Referee: Carmine Russo
Note: Postponed from 8 January due to inclement weather.

5 February 2017 23	Pescara	2–6	Lazio	Pescara
15:00 CET (UTC+01:00)	Benali 29'; Brugman 41'	Report	Parolo 10', 14', 49', 77'; Keita 57'; Immobile 69'; Biglia (yellow card) 76'	Stadium: Stadio Adriatico – Giovanni Cornacchia; Attendance: 11,511; Referee: Piero Giacomelli

12 February 2017 24	Torino	5–3	Pescara	Turin
15:00 CET (UTC+01:00)	Falque 2'; Ajeti 9'; Belotti 15', 61'; Lukić (yellow card) 31'; Ljajić 53'	Report	Stendardo (yellow card) 3'; Fornasier (yellow card) 24'; Ajeti 73' (o.g.); Benali 75', 83'; Coda (yellow card) 90'	Stadium: Stadio Olimpico Grande Torino; Attendance: 14,827; Referee: Fabio Maresca

19 February 2017 25	Pescara	5–0	Genoa	Pescara
15:00 CET (UTC+01:00)	Orbán 5' (o.g.); Biraghi (yellow card) 12'; Caprari 19', 81', (yellow card) 49'; Benali 31'; Cerri 87'	Report	Rigoni (yellow card) 9'	Stadium: Stadio Adriatico – Giovanni Cornacchia; Attendance: 11,142; Referee: Eugenio Abbattista

26 February 2017 26	Chievo	2–0	Pescara	Verona
15:00 CET (UTC+01:00)	Birsa 12'; Hetemaj (yellow card) 23'; Spolli (yellow card) 34'; De Guzmán (yellow card) 37'; Castro 61'	Report	Memushaj (yellow card) 25'; Cerri (yellow card) 41'; Coda (yellow card) 57'	Stadium: Stadio Marc'Antonio Bentegodi; Attendance: 9,500; Referee: Claudio Gavillucci

4 March 2017 27	Sampdoria	3–1	Pescara	Genoa
18:00 CET (UTC+01:00)	Fernandes 18'; Quagliarella 58'; Schick 68'	Report	Cerri 32'; Coda (yellow card) 48'; Bruno (yellow card) 87'	Stadium: Stadio Luigi Ferraris; Attendance: 17,660; Referee: Fabrizio Pasqua

12 March 2017 28	Pescara	1–3	Udinese	Pescara
15:00 CET (UTC+01:00)	Bruno (yellow card) 39'; Bovo (yellow card) 53'; Muntari 83'	Report	Angella (yellow card) 12'; Zapata 20'; Hallfreðsson (yellow card) 35'; Jankto 51'; Théréau 55'; Gabriel Silva (yellow card) 86'; De Paul (yellow card) 90+4'	Stadium: Stadio Adriatico – Giovanni Cornacchia; Attendance: 11,105; Referee: Domenico Celi

19 March 2017 29	Atalanta	3–0	Pescara	Bergamo
15:00 CET (UTC+01:00)	Gómez 13', 90+3'; Masiello (yellow card) 62'; Grassi 69'; Hateboer (yellow card) 89'	Report	Muntari (yellow card) 27'; Verre (yellow card) 67'	Stadium: Stadio Atleti Azzurri d'Italia; Attendance: 17,844; Referee: Michael Fabbri

2 April 2017 30	Pescara	1–1	Milan	Pescara
15:00 CEST (UTC+02:00)	Paletta 12' (o.g.); Biraghi (yellow card) 25'; Bovo (yellow card) 52'; Coulibaly (yellow card) 62'; Memushaj (yellow card) 75'; Bruno (yellow card) 85'	Report	Pašalić 41'; Paletta (yellow card) 58'; Sosa (yellow card) 63'; Locatelli (yellow card) 78'	Stadium: Stadio Adriatico – Giovanni Cornacchia; Attendance: 19,809; Referee: Paolo Mazzoleni

8 April 2017 31	Empoli	1–1	Pescara	Empoli
15:00 CEST (UTC+02:00)	El Kaddouri 9'; Krunić (yellow card) 26'; Büchel (yellow card) 38'	Report	Campagnaro (yellow card) 6'; Bovo (yellow card) 10'; Caprari 31'; Muntari (yellow card) 54'	Stadium: Stadio Carlo Castellani; Attendance: 7,711; Referee: Paolo Tagliavento

15 April 2017 32	Pescara	0–2	Juventus	Pescara
15:00 CEST (UTC+02:00)	Muntari (yellow card) 3'; Coulibaly (yellow card) 39'; Caprari (yellow card) 59'; Coda (yellow card) 89'	Report	Pjanić (yellow card) 12'; Higuaín 22', 43'	Stadium: Stadio Adriatico – Giovanni Cornacchia; Attendance: 19,938; Referee: Marco Di Bello

24 April 2017 33	Pescara	1–4	Roma	Pescara
20:45 CEST (UTC+02:00)	Biraghi (yellow card) 37'; Muntari (yellow card) 40'; Benali 83'	Report	Strootman 44'; Nainggolan 45'; Salah 48', 60'	Stadium: Stadio Adriatico – Giovanni Cornacchia; Attendance: 15,368; Referee: Massimiliano Irrati

30 April 2017 34	Cagliari	1–0	Pescara	Cagliari
15:00 CEST (UTC+02:00)	João Pedro 23' (pen.); Alves (yellow card) 64'	Report	Fornasier (yellow card) 22'; Miličević (yellow card) 44'; Kastanos (yellow card) 83'; Muntari (yellow card) 90' (yellow-red card) 90+6'	Stadium: Stadio Sant'Elia; Attendance: 11,125; Referee: Daniele Minelli

7 May 2017 35	Pescara	0–1	Crotone	Pescara
15:00 CEST (UTC+02:00)	Caprari (yellow card) 42'; Brugman (yellow card) 62'; Benali (yellow card) 76' (red card) 76'; Coulibaly (yellow card) 83'	Report	Capezzi (yellow card) 54'; Tonev 71', (yellow card) 72'	Stadium: Stadio Adriatico – Giovanni Cornacchia; Attendance: 10,447; Referee: Carmine Russo

14 May 2017 36	Bologna	3–1	Pescara	Bologna
15:00 CEST (UTC+02:00)	Destro 8', 90+1', (yellow card) 90+2'; Di Francesco 48'; Donsah (yellow card) 50'	Report	Bahebeck 24'; Bovo (yellow card) 34'; Coulibaly (yellow card) 39'	Stadium: Stadio Renato Dall'Ara; Attendance: 21,546; Referee: Antonio Di Martino

22 May 2017 37	Pescara	2–0	Palermo	Pescara
20:45 CEST (UTC+02:00)	Murić 15'; Biraghi (yellow card) 43'; Brugman (yellow card) 60'; Mitriță 87'	Report		Stadium: Stadio Adriatico – Giovanni Cornacchia; Attendance: 10,062; Referee: Luca Pairetto

28 May 2017 38	Fiorentina	2–2	Pescara	Florence
20:45 CEST (UTC+02:00)	Chiesa (yellow card) 36' (yellow-red card) 38'; Astori (yellow card) 65'; Saponara 66'; Hagi (yellow card) 77'; Vecino 85'	Report	Caprari 15'; Campagnaro (yellow card) 42'; Bahebeck 65'	Stadium: Stadio Artemio Franchi; Attendance: 24,519; Referee: Daniele Martinelli

Note

1. The Lega Serie A decided to award the match to Pescara against Sassuolo as a 3–0 forfeit win after Sassuolo were found guilty for fielding an ineligible player. The match originally ended 2–1 to Sassuolo.

=== Coppa Italia ===
13 August 2016 Third round	Pescara	2–0	Frosinone	Pescara
20:30 CEST (UTC+02:00)	Verre 19', 51'; Coda (yellow card) 43'; Zampano (yellow card) 60'; Cristante (yellow card) 78'; Memushaj (yellow card) 82'	Report	Dionisi (yellow card) 41'	Stadium: Stadio Adriatico – Giovanni Cornacchia; Attendance: 5,410; Referee: Antonio Damato

30 November 2016 Fourth round	Atalanta	3–0	Pescara	Bergamo
18:00 CET (UTC+01:00)	Raimondi 7', (yellow card) 76'; Grassi 29'; Pešić 90+3'	Report	Cristante (yellow card) 28'; Bruno (yellow card) 38'; Župarić (yellow card) 78'	Stadium: Stadio Atleti Azzurri d'Italia; Attendance: 6,344; Referee: Federico La Penna

== Statistics ==
=== Appearances and goals ===
No.	Pos	Nat	Player	Total		Serie A		Coppa Italia	
No.	Pos	Nat	Player	Apps	Goals	Apps	Goals	Apps	Goals
Goalkeepers
1	GK	(Italy) ITA	Vincenzo Fiorillo	10	0	9	0	1	0
12	GK	(Italy) ITA	Gabriele Aldegani	0	0	0	0	0	0
31	GK	(Argentina) ARG	Albano Bizzarri	30	0	29	0	1	0
Defenders
2	DF	(Italy) ITA	Alessandro Crescenzi	21	0	14+7	0	0	0
3	DF	(Italy) ITA	Cristiano Biraghi	37	1	33+2	1	2	0
11	DF	(Italy) ITA	Francesco Zampano	36	0	32+2	0	1+1	0
14	DF	(Argentina) ARG	Hugo Campagnaro	19	2	18+1	2	0	0
23	DF	(Albania) ALB	Leonardo Maloku	0	0	0	0	0	0
35	DF	(Italy) ITA	Andrea Coda	14	0	12+1	0	1	0
44	DF	(Italy) ITA	Michele Fornasier	22	0	16+6	0	0	0
83	DF	(Italy) ITA	Cesare Bovo	10	0	9+1	0	0	0
86	DF	(Italy) ITA	Guglielmo Stendardo	9	0	9	0	0	0
Midfielders
5	MF	(Italy) ITA	Alessandro Bruno	16	0	10+5	0	1	0
7	MF	(Italy) ITA	Valerio Verre	30	2	23+5	0	2	2
8	MF	(Albania) ALB	Ledian Memushaj	38	1	35+1	1	1+1	0
9	MF	(Cyprus) CYP	Grigoris Kastanos	8	0	3+5	0	0	0
10	MF	(Libya) LBY	Ahmad Benali	35	6	32+2	6	1	0
13	MF	(Ghana) GHA	Sulley Muntari	9	1	7+2	1	0	0
16	MF	(Uruguay) URU	Gastón Brugman	28	1	22+5	1	1	0
21	MF	(Italy) ITA	Simone Pepe	12	0	3+9	0	0	0
26	MF	(Italy) ITA	Davide Vitturini	4	0	2+1	0	1	0
28	MF	(Romania) ROU	Alexandru Mitriță	17	1	4+11	1	1+1	0
33	MF	(Senegal) SEN	Mamadou Coulibaly	9	0	6+3	0	0	0
36	MF	(Argentina) ARG	Adrián Cubas	1	0	0+1	0	0	0
93	MF	(Bosnia and Herzegovina) BIH	Hrvoje Miličević	3	0	1+2	0	0	0
98	MF	(Italy) ITA	Ferdinando Del Sole	1	0	0	0	0+1	0
Forwards
15	FW	(France) FRA	Jean-Christophe Bahebeck	15	4	11+4	4	0	0
17	FW	(Italy) ITA	Gianluca Caprari	36	9	34+1	9	1	0
19	FW	(Italy) ITA	Alberto Gilardino	3	0	1+2	0	0	0
20	FW	(Italy) ITA	Alberto Cerri	13	2	7+6	2	0	0
30	FW	(Croatia) CRO	Robert Murić	6	1	2+3	1	1	0
Players transferred out during the season
6	MF	(Italy) ITA	Bryan Cristante	18	0	10+6	0	2	0
9	FW	(Albania) ALB	Rey Manaj	13	2	4+8	2	0+1	0
13	DF	(Croatia) CRO	Dario Župarić	9	0	3+4	0	2	0
20	MF	(Italy) ITA	Alberto Aquilani	8	1	5+3	1	0	0
27	FW	(Italy) ITA	Stefano Pettinari	7	0	2+4	0	1	0
37	DF	(Slovakia) SVK	Norbert Gyömbér	12	0	10	0	1+1	0

Last updated: 28 May 2017
Source: Competitions

=== Goalscorers ===
Rank	No.	Pos	Nat	Name	Serie A	Coppa Italia	Total
1	17	FW	(Italy)	Gianluca Caprari	9	0	9
2	10	MF	(Libya)	Ahmad Benali	6	0	6
3	15	FW	(France)	Jean-Christophe Bahebeck	4	0	4
4	7	MF	(Italy)	Valerio Verre	0	2	2
4	9	FW	(Albania)	Rey Manaj	2	0	2
4	14	DF	(Argentina)	Hugo Campagnaro	2	0	2
4	20	FW	(Italy)	Alberto Cerri	2	0	2
8	3	DF	(Italy)	Cristiano Biraghi	1	0	1
8	8	MF	(Albania)	Ledian Memushaj	1	0	1
8	13	MF	(Ghana)	Sulley Muntari	1	0	1
8	16	MF	(Uruguay)	Gastón Brugman	1	0	1
8	20	MF	(Italy)	Alberto Aquilani	1	0	1
8	28	MF	(Romania)	Alexandru Mitriță	1	0	1
8	30	FW	(Croatia)	Robert Murić	1	0	1
Own goal					3	0	3
Totals					35	2	37

Last updated: 28 May 2017

=== Clean sheets ===
Rank	No.	Pos	Nat	Name	Serie A	Coppa Italia	Total
1	31	GK	(Argentina)	Albano Bizzarri	2	1	3
2	1	GK	(Italy)	Vincenzo Fiorillo	1	0	1
Totals					3	1	4

Last updated: 28 May 2017

=== Disciplinary record ===
No.	Pos	Nat	Player	Serie A			Coppa Italia			Total		
No.	Pos	Nat	Player	Booked	(yellow card) (yellow-red card)	Sent off (straight red)	Booked	(yellow card) (yellow-red card)	Sent off (straight red)	Booked	(yellow card) (yellow-red card)	Sent off (straight red)
1	GK	(Italy)	Vincenzo Fiorillo	0	0	0	0	0	0	0	0	0
12	GK	(Italy)	Gabriele Aldegani	0	0	0	0	0	0	0	0	0
18	GK	(Italy)	Simone Aresti	0	0	0	0	0	0	0	0	0
22	GK	(Italy)	Mirko Pigliacelli	0	0	0	0	0	0	0	0	0
31	GK	(Argentina)	Albano Bizzarri	2	0	0	0	0	0	2	0	0
2	DF	(Italy)	Alessandro Crescenzi	1	0	0	0	0	0	1	0	0
3	DF	(Italy)	Cristiano Biraghi	11	0	0	0	0	0	11	0	0
11	DF	(Italy)	Francesco Zampano	2	0	0	1	0	0	3	0	0
13	DF	(Croatia)	Dario Župarić	1	0	0	1	0	0	2	0	0
14	DF	(Argentina)	Hugo Campagnaro	8	0	0	0	0	0	8	0	0
26	DF	(Italy)	Davide Vitturini	0	0	0	0	0	0	0	0	0
35	DF	(Italy)	Andrea Coda	6	1	0	1	0	0	7	1	0
37	DF	(Slovakia)	Norbert Gyömbér	4	0	0	0	0	0	4	0	0
44	DF	(Italy)	Michele Fornasier	4	0	0	0	0	0	4	0	0
83	DF	(Italy)	Cesare Bovo	4	0	0	0	0	0	4	0	0
86	DF	(Italy)	Guglielmo Stendardo	1	0	0	0	0	0	1	0	0
5	MF	(Italy)	Alessandro Bruno	6	0	0	1	0	0	7	0	0
6	MF	(Italy)	Bryan Cristante	1	0	0	2	0	0	3	0	0
7	MF	(Italy)	Valerio Verre	2	0	1	0	0	0	2	0	1
8	MF	(Albania)	Ledian Memushaj	3	0	0	1	0	0	4	0	0
9	MF	(Cyprus)	Grigoris Kastanos	1	0	0	0	0	0	1	0	0
10	MF	(Libya)	Ahmad Benali	5	0	1	0	0	0	5	0	1
13	MF	(Ghana)	Sulley Muntari	4	1	0	0	0	0	4	1	0
16	MF	(Uruguay)	Gastón Brugman	7	0	0	0	0	0	7	0	0
20	MF	(Italy)	Alberto Aquilani	1	1	0	0	0	0	1	1	0
21	MF	(Italy)	Simone Pepe	0	0	0	0	0	0	0	0	0
28	MF	(Romania)	Alexandru Mitriță	1	0	0	0	0	0	1	0	0
33	MF	(Senegal)	Mamadou Coulibaly	4	0	0	0	0	0	4	0	0
93	MF	(Bosnia and Herzegovina)	Hrvoje Miličević	1	0	0	0	0	0	1	0	0
9	FW	(Albania)	Rey Manaj	2	0	0	0	0	0	2	0	0
15	FW	(France)	Jean-Christophe Bahebeck	0	0	0	0	0	0	0	0	0
17	FW	(Italy)	Gianluca Caprari	8	0	0	0	0	0	8	0	0
20	FW	(Italy)	Alberto Cerri	1	0	0	0	0	0	1	0	0
27	FW	(Italy)	Stefano Pettinari	1	0	0	0	0	0	1	0	0
30	FW	(Croatia)	Robert Murić	0	0	0	0	0	0	0	0	0
Totals				92	3	2	7	0	0	99	3	2

Last updated: 28 May 2017
