= 2023–24 SS Monopoli 1966 season =

SS Monopoli 1966
2023–24 season
- Manager: Francesco Tomei (until 18 December); Roberto Taurino (from 29 December)
- Stadium: Stadio Vito Simone Veneziani
- Serie C: Ongoing
- Coppa Italia Serie C: First round

The 2023–24 season was SS Monopoli 1966's 58th season in existence and ninth consecutive in the Serie C. They also competed in the Coppa Italia Serie C.

== Players ==
=== First-team squad ===
As of 4 September 2023.

Note: Flags indicate national team as defined under FIFA eligibility rules; some limited exceptions apply. Players may hold more than one non-FIFA nationality.

| No. | Pos. | Nation | Player |
|---|---|---|---|
| 1 | GK | ITA | Samuele Vitale |
| 2 | DF | ITA | Luigi Sorgente |
| 3 | DF | ITA | Vito Dibenedetto |
| 4 | DF | ITA | Antony Angileri |
| 5 | DF | ITA | Riccardo Cargnelutti |
| 6 | DF | ITA | Michele Fornasier |
| 7 | MF | ITA | Ernesto Starita |
| 8 | FW | ITA | Andrea De Paoli |
| 9 | FW | ITA | Emanuele Santaniello |
| 10 | FW | ITA | Giuseppe Borello |
| 11 | FW | ITA | Giuseppe D'Agostino (on loan from Napoli) |
| 12 | GK | ROU | Edoardo Alloj |
| 13 | DF | ITA | Pasquale Fazio |
| 14 | MF | ITA | Orlando Viteritti |
| 16 | DF | ITA | Manuel Ferrini |

| No. | Pos. | Nation | Player |
|---|---|---|---|
| 17 | MF | ITA | Claudio Cristallo |
| 19 | MF | ITA | Carlo De Risio |
| 21 | MF | ITA | Savio Piarulli |
| 23 | FW | ITA | Giuseppe Simone |
| 24 | DF | ITA | Mirco De Santis |
| 25 | MF | ITA | Francesco Vassallo |
| 27 | MF | ITA | Zaccaria Hamlili |
| 30 | MF | ITA | Matteo Mazzotta |
| 31 | GK | GRE | Nikolaos Botis (on loan from Inter) |
| 33 | GK | ITA | Pietro Perina |
| 38 | FW | ITA | Pasquale Riccardi (on loan from Potenza) |
| 77 | MF | ITA | Lorenzo Peschetola |
| 78 | MF | ITA | Gennaro Iaccarino (on loan from Napoli) |
| 99 | FW | ITA | Samuele Spalluto |

=== Out on loan ===
Note: Flags indicate national team as defined under FIFA eligibility rules; some limited exceptions apply. Players may hold more than one non-FIFA nationality.

| No. | Pos. | Nation | Player |
|---|---|---|---|
| — | MF | ITA | Gaetano Vitale (at Sorrento until 30 June 2024) |

== Transfers ==
=== In ===
| Pos. | Player | Transferred from | Fee | Date | Source |

=== Out ===
| Pos. | Player | Transferred to | Fee | Date | Source |

== Pre-season and friendlies ==
Win Draw Loss Fixtures

| Friendly | (Italy) | v | (Italy) |
| --:-- CEST (UTC+2) |

== Competitions ==
=== Overall record ===
| Competition | First match | Last match | Starting round | Final position | Record | | | | | | | |
| Competition | First match | Last match | Starting round | Final position | Pld | W | D | L | GF | GA | GD | Win % |
|---|---|---|---|---|---|---|---|---|---|---|---|---|
| Serie C | September 2023 | 28 April 2024 | Matchday 1 | | 19 | 4 | 7 | 8 | 22 | 29 | −7 | 21.05 |
| Coppa Italia Serie C | 4 October 2023 | | First round | First round | 1 | 0 | 0 | 1 | 0 | 3 | −3 | 0.00 |
| Total | | | | | 20 | 4 | 7 | 9 | 22 | 32 | −10 | 20.00 |

Last updated: September 2023
Source: Soccerway

=== Serie C ===
==== League table ====
| Pos | Team | Pld | W | D | L | GF | GA | GD | Pts | Qualification |
|---|---|---|---|---|---|---|---|---|---|---|
| 15 | Turris | 38 | 11 | 11 | 16 | 46 | 57 | −11 | 44 | |
| 16 | Potenza (O) | 38 | 10 | 13 | 15 | 38 | 47 | −9 | 43 | Relegation play-outs |
| 17 | Monopoli (O) | 38 | 10 | 12 | 16 | 41 | 51 | −10 | 42 | Relegation play-outs |
| 18 | Virtus Francavilla (R) | 38 | 8 | 11 | 19 | 30 | 50 | −20 | 35 (Note: Virtus Francavilla are ahead of Monterosi on head-to-head goal difference: Virtus Francavilla +1, Monterosi -1.) | Relegation play-outs |
| 19 | Monterosi (R) | 38 | 8 | 11 | 19 | 43 | 62 | −19 | 35 | Relegation play-outs |

Updated to match(es) played on 27 April 2024. Source: Lega Pro, Soccerway (in English)
Rules for classification: 1) Points; 2) Head-to-head points; 3) Head-to-head goal difference; 4) Goal difference; 5) Goals scored; 6) Lower goals against; 7) Wins; 8) Lower losses; 9) Away wins; 10) Lower home losses.
(Note: Head-to-head record is used only after all the matches between the teams in question have been played)
(O) Play-off winners; (R) Relegated

==== Results summary ====
| Overall | | | | | | | | Home | | | | | | Away | | | | | |
| Pld | W | D | L | GF | GA | GD | Pts | W | D | L | GF | GA | GD | W | D | L | GF | GA | GD |
|---|---|---|---|---|---|---|---|---|---|---|---|---|---|---|---|---|---|---|---|
| 19 | 4 | 7 | 8 | 22 | 29 | −7 | 19 | 2 | 5 | 2 | 14 | 13 | +1 | 2 | 2 | 6 | 8 | 16 | −8 |

Last updated: 22 December 2023.
Source: Worldfootball

==== Results by round ====
| Round | 1 | 2 | 3 | 4 | 5 | 6 | 7 | 8 | 9 | 10 | 11 | 12 | 13 | 14 | 15 | 16 | 17 | 18 | 19 | 20 |
|---|---|---|---|---|---|---|---|---|---|---|---|---|---|---|---|---|---|---|---|---|
| Ground | A | H | A | H | A | A | H | A | H | H | A | H | A | H | A | H | A | H | A | |
| Result | D | D | L | D | L | L | D | L | W | D | W | D | W | W | L | L | L | L | D | |
| Position | | | | | | | | | | | | | | | | | | | | |

Updated to match(es) played on 22 December 2023. Source: Worldfootball
A = Away; H = Home; W = Win; D = Draw; L = Loss

==== Matches ====
The league fixtures were unveiled on 7 August 2023.

| 24 September 2023 5 | Avellino | 4–0 | Monopoli | Avellino |
| --:-- CEST (UTC+2) | | | | Stadium: Stadio Partenio-Adriano Lombardi |

| 22 December 2023 19 | Messina | 1–1 | Monopoli | Monopoli |
| CET (UTC+1) | | | | Stadium: Stadio San Filippo |

| 6 January 2024 20 | Monopoli | v | Casertana | Monopoli |
| 14:00 CET (UTC+1) | | | | Stadium: Stadio Vito Simone Veneziani |

=== Coppa Italia Serie C ===
| 4 October 2023 First round | Avellino | 3–0 | Monopoli | Avellino |
| --:-- CEST (UTC+2) | | | | Stadium: Stadio Partenio-Adriano Lombardi |
