= 2020–21 Benevento Calcio season =

Benevento
2020–21 season
- Chairman: Oreste Vigorito
- Manager: Filippo Inzaghi
- Stadium: Stadio Ciro Vigorito
- Serie A: 18th (relegated)
- Coppa Italia: Third round
- Top goalscorer: League: Gianluca Caprari (5); All: Gianluca Caprari (5)
| Home colours | Away colours | Third colours |

The 2020–21 season was the first season of Benevento back in the top-flight of Italian football following promotion from Serie B. It was also only be the club's second ever season in Serie A. In addition to the domestic league, Benevento participated in this season's edition of the Coppa Italia. The season covered the period from 7 August 2020 to 30 June 2021.

== Players ==
=== Squad information ===
Players and squad numbers last updated on 20 August 2020. Appearances include league matches only.
Note: Flags indicate national team as has been defined under FIFA eligibility rules. Players may hold more than one non-FIFA nationality.

| No. | Name | Nat | Position(s) | Date of birth (Age) | Signed in | Contract ends | Signed from | Apps. | Goals |
Goalkeepers
| 1 | Lorenzo Montipò | (Italy) | GK | 20 February 1996 (age 30) | 2019 | 2021 | (Italy) Novara | 61 | 0 |
| 12 | Niccolò Manfredini | (Italy) | GK | 1 May 1988 (age 38) | 2019 | | (Italy) Spezia | 2 | 0 |
| 80 | Pier Graziano Gori | (Italy) | GK | 10 May 1980 (age 46) | 2018 | | (Italy) Venezia | 142 | 0 |
Defenders
| 2 | Francesco Rillo | (Italy) | LB | 23 May 2000 (age 26) | 2019 | | (Italy) Youth Sector | 4 | 0 |
| 3 | Gaetano Letizia | (Italy) | LB/RB | 29 June 1990 (age 36) | 2017 | 2022 | (Italy) Carpi | 89 | 3 |
| 5 | Luca Caldirola | (Italy) | CB/LB | 1 February 1991 (age 35) | 2019 | 2021 | (Germany) Werder Bremen | 47 | 6 |
| 11 | Christian Maggio | (Italy) | RB | 11 February 1982 (age 44) | 2018 | | (Italy) Napoli | 50 | 5 |
| 13 | Alessandro Tuia | (Italy) | CB | 8 June 1990 (age 36) | 2018 | 2021 | (Italy) Salernitana | 26 | 3 |
| 14 | Massimo Volta | (Italy) | CB | 14 May 1987 (age 39) | 2019 | 2021 | (Italy) Perugia | 45 | 2 |
| 23 | Luca Antei | (Italy) | CB | 19 August 1992 (age 34) | 2018 | 2021 | (Italy) Sassuolo | 40 | 0 |
| 93 | Federico Barba | (Italy) | LB/CB | 1 September 1993 (age 33) | 2020 | 2023 | (Italy) Chievo Verona | 14 | 1 |
| 15 | Kamil Glik | (Poland) | CB | 3 February 1988 (age 38) | 2020 | 2023 | (France) Monaco | 0 | 0 |
Midfielders
| 4 | Lorenzo Del Pinto | (Italy) | CM/DM | 17 June 1990 (age 36) | 2015 | 2021 | (Italy) L'Aquila | 110 | 2 |
| 6 | Siriki Sanogo | (Ivory Coast) | CM | 13 December 2001 (age 24) | 2019 | | (Italy) Youth Sector | 4 | 0 |
| 7 | Oliver Kragl | (Germany) | LM/AM | 12 May 1990 (age 36) | 2019 | 2022 | (Italy) Foggia | 27 | 5 |
| 8 | Andrés Tello | (Colombia) | CM/DM | 6 September 1996 (age 30) | 2018 | 2021 | (Italy) Juventus | 55 | 3 |
| 10 | Nicolas Viola | (Italy) | CM/DM | 12 October 1989 (age 37) | 2017 | 2021 | (Italy) Novara | 89 | 16 |
| 16 | Riccardo Improta | (Italy) | LW/LM/RW | 19 December 1993 (age 32) | 2018 | 2022 | (Italy) Genoa | 62 | 7 |
| 17 | Abdallah Basit | (Ghana) | DM/CM | 15 October 1999 (age 27) | 2019 | 2022 | (Italy) Arezzo | 5 | 0 |
| 19 | Roberto Insigne | (Italy) | RW/SS | 11 May 1994 (age 32) | 2019 | 2021 | (Italy) Napoli | 60 | 15 |
| 56 | Përparim Hetemaj | (Finland) | CM | 12 December 1986 (age 39) | 2019 | 2021 | (Italy) Chievo Verona | 33 | 0 |
| 27 | Dejan Vokić | (Slovenia) | AM/SS | 12 June 1996 (age 30) | 2019 | 2021 | (Poland) Zagłębie Sosnowiec | 7 | 0 |
| 28 | Pasquale Schiattarella | (Italy) | DM/CM | 30 May 1987 (age 39) | 2019 | 2022 | (Italy) S.P.A.L. | 26 | 0 |
| 29 | Artur Ioniță | (Moldova) | CM | 17 August 1990 (age 36) | 2020 | 2023 | (Italy) Cagliari | 0 | 0 |
Forwards
| 20 | Giuseppe Di Serio | (Italy) | CF | 20 July 2001 (age 25) | 2019 | 2021 | (Italy) Youth Sector | 8 | 1 |
| 25 | Marco Sau | (Italy) | CF/SS | 3 November 1987 (age 39) | 2019 | 2021 | (Italy) Sampdoria | 31 | 13 |
| 32 | Gabriele Moncini | (Italy) | CF | 26 April 1996 (age 30) | 2020 | 2023 | (Italy) S.P.A.L. | 19 | 4 |

== Transfers ==
=== In ===
| Date | Pos. | Player | Age | Moving from | Fee | Notes | Source |
|---|---|---|---|---|---|---|---|
| 11 August 2020 | DF | (Poland) Kamil Glik | 32 | (France) Monaco | Undislosed | Contract until June 2023 | |
| 20 August 2020 | MF | (Moldova) Artur Ioniță | 30 | (Italy) Cagliari | Undisclosed | Contract until June 2023 | |
| 24 August 2020 | DF | (Belgium) Daam Foulon | 21 | (Belgium) Waasland-Beveren | Undisclosed | Contract until June 2023 | |

== Pre-season and friendlies ==
Benevento began their pre-season on August 17 in Seefeld in Tirol, Austria. Filippo Inzaghi announced a squad of 30 players would take part in the training camp.

| 24 August 2020 Friendly | SC Imst (Austria) | Cancelled | (Italy) Benevento | Imst, Austria |
| 18:00 CEST (UTC+2) | | | | Stadium: Velly Arena |

| 28 August 2020 Friendly | Schalke 04 (Germany) | Cancelled | (Italy) Benevento | Imst, Austria |
| 16:00 CEST (UTC+2) | | | | Stadium: Velly Arena |

| 5 September 2020 Friendly | Roma (Italy) | Cancelled | (Italy) Benevento | Trigoria, Italy |
| 18:00 CEST (UTC+2) |

| 12 September 2020 Friendly | Benevento (Italy) | 2–1 | (Italy) Reggina | Benevento, Italy |
| 19:00 CEST (UTC+2) | Moncini 56'; Improta 61' | | Loiacono 54' | Stadium: Stadio Ciro Vigorito |

| 19 September 2020 Friendly | Lazio (Italy) | 0–0 | (Italy) Benevento | Rome, Italy |
| 18:00 CEST (UTC+2) | | | | Stadium: Stadio Olimpico; Referee: Fabrizio Pasqua |

== Competitions ==
=== Overview ===
| Competition | First match | Last match | Starting round | Final position | Record | | | | | | | |
| Competition | First match | Last match | Starting round | Final position | Pld | W | D | L | GF | GA | GD | Win % |
|---|---|---|---|---|---|---|---|---|---|---|---|---|
| Serie A | 26 September 2020 | 23 May 2021 | Matchday 1 | 18th | 38 | 7 | 12 | 19 | 40 | 75 | −35 | 18.42 |
| Coppa Italia | 28 October 2020 | | Third round | Third round | 1 | 0 | 0 | 1 | 2 | 4 | −2 | 0.00 |
| Total | | | | | 39 | 7 | 12 | 20 | 42 | 79 | −37 | 17.95 |

Last updated: 23 May 2021
Source: Soccerway

=== Serie A ===
==== League table ====
| Pos | Team | Pld | W | D | L | GF | GA | GD | Pts | Qualification or relegation |
|---|---|---|---|---|---|---|---|---|---|---|
| 16 | Cagliari | 38 | 9 | 10 | 19 | 43 | 59 | −16 | 37 | |
| 17 | Torino | 38 | 7 | 16 | 15 | 50 | 69 | −19 | 37 | |
| 18 | Benevento (R) | 38 | 7 | 12 | 19 | 40 | 75 | −35 | 33 | Relegation to Serie B |
| 19 | Crotone (R) | 38 | 6 | 5 | 27 | 45 | 92 | −47 | 23 | Relegation to Serie B |
| 20 | Parma (R) | 38 | 3 | 11 | 24 | 39 | 83 | −44 | 20 | Relegation to Serie B |

Source: Serie A, Soccerway
Rules for classification: 1) Points; 2) Head-to-head points; 3) Head-to-head goal difference; 4) Goal difference; 5) Goals scored; 6) Draw. (Note: Head-to-head record is used only after all the matches between the teams in question have been played)
(R) Relegated

==== Results summary ====
| Overall | | | | | | | | Home | | | | | | Away | | | | | |
| Pld | W | D | L | GF | GA | GD | Pts | W | D | L | GF | GA | GD | W | D | L | GF | GA | GD |
|---|---|---|---|---|---|---|---|---|---|---|---|---|---|---|---|---|---|---|---|
| 38 | 7 | 12 | 19 | 40 | 75 | −35 | 33 | 2 | 7 | 10 | 19 | 39 | −20 | 5 | 5 | 9 | 21 | 36 | −15 |

Last updated: 23 May 2021.
Source: Serie A

==== Results by round ====
| Round | 1 | 2 | 3 | 4 | 5 | 6 | 7 | 8 | 9 | 10 | 11 | 12 | 13 | 14 | 15 | 16 | 17 | 18 | 19 | 20 | 21 | 22 | 23 | 24 | 25 | 26 | 27 | 28 | 29 | 30 | 31 | 32 | 33 | 34 | 35 | 36 | 37 | 38 |
|---|---|---|---|---|---|---|---|---|---|---|---|---|---|---|---|---|---|---|---|---|---|---|---|---|---|---|---|---|---|---|---|---|---|---|---|---|---|---|
| Ground | H | A | H | A | H | A | H | A | H | A | A | H | H | A | H | A | H | A | H | A | H | A | H | A | H | A | H | A | H | H | A | A | H | A | H | A | H | A |
| Result | L | W | W | L | L | L | L | W | D | D | L | D | W | W | L | W | L | L | D | L | D | D | D | L | L | D | L | W | D | L | L | D | L | L | L | L | D | D |
| Position | 14 | 12 | 7 | 10 | 13 | 14 | 16 | 14 | 15 | 13 | 15 | 15 | 12 | 10 | 10 | 10 | 10 | 11 | 11 | 12 | 14 | 15 | 15 | 16 | 16 | 16 | 16 | 16 | 15 | 16 | 17 | 17 | 18 | 18 | 18 | 18 | 18 | 18 |

Updated to match(es) played on 23 May 2021. Source: Serie A
A = Away; H = Home; W = Win; D = Draw; L = Loss

==== Matches ====
The league fixtures were announced on 2 September 2020.

| 26 September 2020 2 | Sampdoria | 2–3 | Benevento | Genoa |
| 18:00 CEST (UTC+2) | Quagliarella 8'; Colley 18'; Augello (yellow card) 32'; Tonelli (yellow card) 48'; Ramírez (yellow card) 89' | Report | Caldirola 33', 72'; Dabo (yellow card) 56'; Letizia 88' | Stadium: Stadio Luigi Ferraris; Referee: Federico Dionisi |

| 30 September 2020 1 | Benevento | 2–5 | Internazionale | Benevento |
| 18:00 CEST (UTC+2) | Caprari 34', 76'; Schiattarella (yellow card) 73' | Report | Lukaku 1', 28'; Gagliardini 25'; Hakimi 42'; Martínez 71' | Stadium: Stadio Ciro Vigorito; Referee: Marco Piccinini |
Note: The match was originally scheduled for 20 September 2020, but was postponed due to Inter's involvement in the knockout phase of the UEFA Europa League.

| 4 October 2020 3 | Benevento | 1–0 | Bologna | Benevento |
| 15:00 CEST (UTC+2) | Lapadula 66'; Schiattarella (yellow card) 79'; Foulon (yellow card) 83' | Report | Svanberg (yellow card) 74' | Stadium: Stadio Ciro Vigorito; Referee: Simone Sozza |

| 18 October 2020 4 | Roma | 5–2 | Benevento | Rome |
| 20:45 CEST (UTC+2) | Pedro 31'; Ibañez (yellow card) 33'; Džeko 35', 77'; Veretout (yellow card) 52', (goal) 69' (pen.); Santon (yellow card) 65'; Pérez 89' | Report | Caprari 5', (yellow card) 32'; Lapadula (penalty missed) 55, 55'; Foulon (yellow card) 82' | Stadium: Stadio Olimpico; Referee: Giovanni Ayroldi |

| 25 October 2020 5 | Benevento | 1–2 | Napoli | Benevento |
| 15:00 CET (UTC+1) | R. Insigne 30'; Caprari (yellow card) 45+1'; Foulon (yellow card) 57'; Glik (yellow card) 85' | Report | L. Insigne 60'; Petagna 67'; Politano (yellow card) 90+7' | Stadium: Stadio Ciro Vigorito; Referee: Daniele Doveri |

| 2 November 2020 6 | Hellas Verona | 3–1 | Benevento | Verona |
| 20:45 CET (UTC+1) | Barák 17', 63', (yellow card) 29'; Lovato (yellow card) 44'; Zaccagni (yellow card) 65'; Lazović (yellow card) 76', (goal) 77'; Magnani (yellow card) 83' | Report | Caldirola (yellow card) 25'; Schiattarella (yellow card) 43'; Glik (yellow card) 55'; Lapadula 56'; Ioniță (yellow card) 71'; Caprari (red card) 73' | Stadium: Stadio Marcantonio Bentegodi; Attendance: 0 Referee: Juan Luca Sacchi |

| 7 November 2020 7 | Benevento | 0–3 | Spezia | Benevento |
| 18:00 CET (UTC+1) | Improta (yellow card) 47'; Maggio (yellow card) 83'; Caldirola (yellow card) 90' | Report | Pobega 29'; Bastoni (yellow card) 54'; Agudelo (yellow card) 57'; Nzola 65', 70'; Estévez (yellow card) 82' | Stadium: Stadio Ciro Vigorito; Attendance: 0 Referee: Gianluca Aureliano |

| 22 November 2020 8 | Fiorentina | 0–1 | Benevento | Florence |
| 12:30 CET (UTC+1) | Biraghi (yellow card) 87'; Lirola (yellow card) 90+1' | Report | Glik (yellow card) 18'; Improta 52'; Letizia (yellow card) 53'; Hetemaj (yellow card) 74' | Stadium: Stadio Artemio Franchi; Attendance: 0 Referee: Davide Ghersini |

| 28 November 2020 9 | Benevento | 1–1 | Juventus | Benevento |
| 18:00 CET (UTC+1) | Letizia 45+3'; Maggio (yellow card) 59'; Schiattarella (yellow card) 82'; Glik (yellow card) 86'; Barba (yellow card) 87'; Improta (yellow card) 90+5'; Insigne (yellow card) 90+6' | Report | Morata 21', (red card) 90+7'; Cuadrado (yellow card) 81' | Stadium: Stadio Ciro Vigorito; Attendance: 0 Referee: Fabrizio Pasqua |

| 6 December 2020 10 | Parma | 0–0 | Benevento | Parma |
| 15:00 CET (UTC+1) | Hernani (yellow card) 17'; Scozzarella (yellow card) 48'; Brunetta (yellow card) 73'; Kurtić (yellow card) 89' | Report | Ioniță (yellow card) 34'; Barba (yellow card) 58'; Improta (yellow card) 84'; Tello (yellow card) 90+2' | Stadium: Stadio Ennio Tardini; Attendance: 0 Referee: Juan Luca Sacchi |

| 11 December 2020 11 | Sassuolo | 1–0 | Benevento | Reggio Emilia |
| 20:45 CET (UTC+1) | Berardi 7' (pen.), (yellow card) 40'; Haraslín (red card) 49'; Ayhan (yellow card) 86' | Report | Hetemaj (yellow card) 9'; Ioniță (yellow card) 23'; Barba (yellow card) 69'; Dabo (yellow card) 87' | Stadium: Mapei Stadium; Attendance: 0 Referee: Simone Sozza |

| 15 December 2020 12 | Benevento | 1–1 | Lazio | Benevento |
| 20:45 CET (UTC+1) | Tuia (yellow card) 23'; Lapadula (yellow card) 30'; Schiattarella 45', (red card) 90+3' | Report | Immobile 25'; Luiz Felipe (yellow card) 54'; Patric (yellow card) 90+4' | Stadium: Stadio Ciro Vigorito; Attendance: 0 Referee: Luca Pairetto |

| 20 December 2020 13 | Benevento | 2–0 | Genoa | Benevento |
| 15:00 CET (UTC+1) | Caprari (yellow card) 43'; Insigne 57'; Sau 89' (pen.) | Report | Bani (yellow card) 13'; Goldaniga (yellow card) 67'; Masiello (yellow card) 88' | Stadium: Stadio Ciro Vigorito; Attendance: 0 Referee: Antonio Giua |

| 23 December 2020 14 | Udinese | 0–2 | Benevento | Udine |
| 20:45 CET (UTC+1) | Becão (yellow card) 20' | Report | Insigne (yellow card) 8'; Caprari 9'; Tuia (yellow card) 45'; Letizia 77' | Stadium: Stadio Friuli; Attendance: 0 Referee: Manuel Volpi |

| 3 January 2021 15 | Benevento | 0–2 | Milan | Benevento |
| 18:00 CET (UTC+1) | Schiattarella (yellow card) 32'; Caprari (penalty missed) 61' | Report | Kessié 15' (pen.); Tonali (red card) 34'; Çalhanoğlu (yellow card) 41'; Leão 49', (yellow card) 80'; Dalot (yellow card) 78' | Stadium: Stadio Ciro Vigorito; Attendance: 0 Referee: Fabrizio Pasqua |

| 6 January 2021 16 | Cagliari | 1–2 | Benevento | Cagliari |
| 12:30 CET (UTC+1) | Caligara (yellow card) 5'; João Pedro 20'; Nández (yellow card) 84', (red card) 85'; Sottil (yellow card) 89'; Pisacane (yellow card) 90+4' | Report | Schiattarella (yellow card) 6'; Sau 41'; Tuia 44'; Caprari (yellow card) 84'; Improta (yellow card) 87' | Stadium: Sardegna Arena; Attendance: 0 Referee: Eugenio Abbattista |

| 9 January 2021 17 | Benevento | 1–4 | Atalanta | Benevento |
| 15:00 CET (UTC+1) | Foulon (yellow card) 24'; Sau 50'; Lapadula (yellow card) 53'; Dabo (yellow card) 57' | Report | De Roon (yellow card) 17'; Palomino (yellow card) 26'; Iličić 30'; Toloi 69'; Zapata 71'; Muriel 86' | Stadium: Stadio Ciro Vigorito; Attendance: 0 Referee: Gianluca Manganiello |

| 17 January 2021 18 | Crotone | 4–1 | Benevento | Crotone |
| 15:00 CET (UTC+1) | Glik 5' (o.g.); Simy 29', 54'; Vulić 65'; Messias (yellow card) 87' | Report | Insigne (yellow card) 29'; Ioniță (yellow card) 44'; Sau (red card) 66'; Barba (yellow card) 71'; Falque 82'; Dabo (yellow card) 84' | Stadium: Stadio Ezio Scida; Attendance: 0 Referee: Simone Sozza |

| 22 January 2021 19 | Benevento | 2–2 | Torino | Benevento |
| 20:45 CET (UTC+1) | Viola 31' (pen.); Lapadula 49'; Glik (yellow card) 90+5' | Report | Linetty (yellow card) 37'; Zaza (yellow card) 45+2', (goal) 51', 90+3'; Baselli (yellow card) 90+1' | Stadium: Stadio Ciro Vigorito; Attendance: 0 Referee: Piero Giacomelli |

| 30 January 2021 20 | Internazionale | 4–0 | Benevento | Milan |
| 20:45 CET (UTC+1) | Improta 7' (o.g.); Martínez 57'; Lukaku 67', 78' | Report | Caldirola (yellow card) 28'; Depaoli (yellow card) 32' | Stadium: San Siro; Attendance: 0 Referee: Fabrizio Pasqua |

| 7 February 2021 21 | Benevento | 1–1 | Sampdoria | Benevento |
| 12:30 CET (UTC+1) | Tuia (yellow card) 14'; Improta (yellow card) 31'; Depaoli (yellow card) 41'; Caprari 55'; Ioniță (yellow card) 70' | Report | Silva (yellow card) 6'; Tonelli (yellow card) 48'; Keita 80' | Stadium: Stadio Ciro Vigorito; Attendance: 0 Referee: Gianluca Aureliano |

| 12 February 2021 22 | Bologna | 1–1 | Benevento | Bologna |
| 20:45 CET (UTC+1) | Sansone 1'; Domínguez (yellow card) 3'; Soriano (yellow card) 64'; Vignato (yellow card) 84' | Report | Viola 60'; Schiattarella (yellow card) 64'; Montipò (yellow card) 90+5' | Stadium: Stadio Renato Dall'Ara; Attendance: 0 Referee: Davide Ghersini |

| 21 February 2021 23 | Benevento | 0–0 | Roma | Benevento |
| 20:45 CET (UTC+1) | Schiattarella (yellow card) 14'; Glik (yellow card) 45+1' (yellow-red card) 57'; Montipò (yellow card) 85' | Report | Fazio (yellow card) 20' | Stadium: Stadio Ciro Vigorito; Attendance: 0 Referee: Luca Pairetto |

| 28 February 2021 24 | Napoli | 2–0 | Benevento | Naples |
| 18:00 CET (UTC+1) | Mertens 34'; Koulibaly (yellow card) 58' (yellow-red card) 81'; Di Lorenzo (yellow card) 61'; Politano 66' | Report | Barba (yellow card) 80'; Hetemaj (yellow card) 84' | Stadium: Stadio San Paolo; Attendance: 0 Referee: Rosario Abisso |

| 3 March 2021 25 | Benevento | 0–3 | Hellas Verona | Benevento |
| 20:45 CET (UTC+1) | | Report | Faraoni 25'; Foulon 34' (o.g.); Lasagna 50'; Sturaro (yellow card) 72' | Stadium: Stadio Ciro Vigorito; Attendance: 0 Referee: Giovanni Ayroldi |

| 6 March 2021 26 | Spezia | 1–1 | Benevento | La Spezia |
| 15:00 CET (UTC+1) | Bastoni (yellow card) 25'; Verde 71'; Erlić (yellow card) 80' | Report | Gaich 24'; Improta (yellow card) 44'; Barba (yellow card) 72'; Sau (yellow card) 79'; Dabo (yellow card) 90+2' | Stadium: Stadio Alberto Picco; Attendance: 0 Referee: Francesco Fourneau |

| 13 March 2021 27 | Benevento | 1–4 | Fiorentina | Benevento |
| 18:00 CET (UTC+1) | Glik (yellow card) 36'; Ioniță 56'; Schiattarella (yellow card) 76'; Improta (yellow card) 83' | Report | Vlahović 8', 26', 45+1'; Pulgar (yellow card) 43'; Eysseric 75' | Stadium: Stadio Ciro Vigorito; Attendance: 0 Referee: Piero Giacomelli |

| 21 March 2021 28 | Juventus | 0–1 | Benevento | Turin |
| 15:00 CET (UTC+1) | Bernardeschi (yellow card) 17'; Bentancur (yellow card) 90+2' | Report | Tuia (yellow card) 9'; Gaich 69'; Caldirola (yellow card) 75'; Barba (yellow card) 77'; Tello (yellow card) 84' | Stadium: Allianz Stadium; Attendance: 0 Referee: Rosario Abisso |

| 3 April 2021 29 | Benevento | 2–2 | Parma | Benevento |
| 15:00 CEST (UTC+2) | Glik 23'; Ioniță 67'; Hetemaj (yellow card) 76'; Di Serio (yellow card) 84' | Report | Bani (yellow card) 48'; Kurtić 55'; Man 88' | Stadium: Stadio Ciro Vigorito; Attendance: 0 Referee: Davide Massa |

| 12 April 2021 30 | Benevento | 0–1 | Sassuolo | Benevento |
| 20:45 CEST (UTC+2) | Tuia (yellow card) 55'; Schiattarella (yellow card) 58'; Letizia (yellow card) 84' | Report | Ferrari (yellow card) 11'; Barba 45' (o.g.); Magnanelli (yellow card) 64' | Stadium: Stadio Ciro Vigorito; Attendance: 0 Referee: Valerio Marini |

| 18 April 2021 31 | Lazio | 5–3 | Benevento | Rome |
| 15:00 CEST (UTC+2) | Depaoli 10' (o.g.); Immobile 20', 90+6', (penalty missed) 55'; Correa 36' (pen.); Montipò 48' (o.g.); Akpa Akpro (yellow card) 70'; Parolo (yellow card) 90+3' | Report | Montipò (yellow card) 35'; Sau 45'; Schiattarella (yellow card) 50'; Glik (yellow card) 53', (goal) 85'; Viola 62' (pen.) | Stadium: Stadio Olimpico; Attendance: 0 Referee: Davide Ghersini |

| 21 April 2021 32 | Genoa | 2–2 | Benevento | Genoa |
| 20:45 CEST (UTC+2) | Radovanović (yellow card) 4'; Pandev 11', 21'; Strootman (yellow card) 30' | Report | Viola 5' (pen.); Lapadula 15' | Stadium: Stadio Luigi Ferraris; Attendance: 0 Referee: Luca Pairetto |

| 25 April 2021 33 | Benevento | 2–4 | Udinese | Benevento |
| 12:30 CEST (UTC+2) | Viola 34' (pen.); Schiattarella (yellow card) 81'; Lapadula 83' | Report | Molina 4'; Arslan 31'; Musso (yellow card) 33'; Stryger Larsen 49'; Walace (yellow card) 72'; Braaf 73' | Stadium: Stadio Ciro Vigorito; Attendance: 0 Referee: Maurizio Mariani |

| 1 May 2021 34 | Milan | 2–0 | Benevento | Milan |
| 20:45 CEST (UTC+2) | Çalhanoğlu 6'; Bennacer (yellow card) 38'; Hernandez 60'; Castillejo (yellow card) 90+4' | Report | | Stadium: San Siro; Attendance: 0 Referee: Gianpaolo Calvarese |

| 9 May 2021 35 | Benevento | 1–3 | Cagliari | Benevento |
| 15:00 CEST (UTC+2) | Schiattarella (yellow card) 10'; Lapadula 16'; Tello (yellow card) 56' | Report | Lykogiannis 1'; Pavoletti (yellow card) 13', (goal) 64'; Deiola (yellow card) 58'; João Pedro 90+3' | Stadium: Stadio Ciro Vigorito; Attendance: 0 Referee: Daniele Doveri |

| 12 May 2021 36 | Atalanta | 2–0 | Benevento | Bergamo |
| 20:45 CEST (UTC+2) | Muriel 22'; De Roon (yellow card) 51'; Pašalić 67'; Iličić (yellow card) 81' | Report | Tuia (yellow card) 40'; Barba (yellow card) 56'; Ioniță (yellow card) 60'; Caldirola (yellow card) 80' (yellow-red card) 82' | Stadium: Gewiss Stadium; Attendance: 0 Referee: Davide Massa |

| 16 May 2021 37 | Benevento | 1–1 | Crotone | Benevento |
| 15:00 CEST (UTC+2) | Lapadula 13'; Glik (yellow card) 80'; Gaich (yellow card) 88' | Report | Marrone (yellow card) 15'; Golemić (red card) 24'; Magallán (yellow card) 51'; Simy 90+3' | Stadium: Stadio Ciro Vigorito; Attendance: 0 Referee: Piero Giacomelli |

| 23 May 2021 38 | Torino | 1–1 | Benevento | Turin |
| 20:45 CEST (UTC+2) | Bremer 29' | Report | Tello 72'; Hetemaj (yellow card) 78'; Pastina (yellow card) 90' | Stadium: Stadio Olimpico Grande Torino; Attendance: 0 Referee: Marco Di Bello |

=== Coppa Italia ===
| 28 October 2020 Third round | Benevento | 2–4 | Empoli | Benevento |
| 16:00 CET (UTC+1) | Maggio 57'; Tello (yellow card) 61'; Insigne (yellow card) 61'; Improta (yellow card) 79'; Schiattarella (red card) 80'; Tuia (yellow card) 82' (yellow-red card) 84'; Moncini 90+1' | Report | Olivieri 47'; Mancosu 60', 66', 85', (yellow card) 77'; Matos (yellow card) 75'; Baldanzi (yellow card) 79'; Furlan (yellow card) 90' | Stadium: Stadio Ciro Vigorito; Referee: Ivano Pezzuto |

== Statistics ==
=== Goalscorers ===
As of 12 February 2021

| Rank | No. | Pos | Nat | Name | Serie A | Coppa Italia | Total |
|---|---|---|---|---|---|---|---|
| 1 | 17 | FW | (Italy) | Gianluca Caprari | 5 | 0 | 5 |
| 2 | 9 | FW | (Peru) | Gianluca Lapadula | 4 | 0 | 4 |
| 3 | 3 | DF | (Italy) | Gaetano Letizia | 3 | 0 | 3 |
| 3 | 25 | FW | (Italy) | Marco Sau | 3 | 0 | 3 |
| 5 | 5 | DF | (Italy) | Luca Caldirola | 2 | 0 | 2 |
| 5 | 10 | MF | (Italy) | Nicolas Viola | 2 | 0 | 2 |
| 5 | 19 | MF | (Italy) | Roberto Insigne | 2 | 0 | 2 |
| 8 | 11 | DF | (Italy) | Christian Maggio | 0 | 1 | 1 |
| 8 | 13 | DF | (Italy) | Alessandro Tuia | 1 | 0 | 1 |
| 8 | 16 | MF | (Italy) | Riccardo Improta | 1 | 0 | 1 |
| 8 | 28 | MF | (Italy) | Pasquale Schiattarella | 1 | 0 | 1 |
| 8 | 21 | FW | (Italy) | Gabriele Moncini | 0 | 1 | 1 |
| 8 | 44 | FW | (Spain) | Iago Falque | 1 | 0 | 1 |
| Totals | | | | | 25 | 2 | 27 |

== See also ==
- History of Benevento Calcio
