= Perina (surname) =

Perina is an Italian surname. Peřina (feminine: Peřinová) is a Czech surname. Notable people with these surnames include:

- Bob Perina (1921–1991), American football player
- František Peřina (1911–2006), Czech fighter pilot
- Pietro Perina (born 1992), Italian football player
- Rudolf V. Perina (born Rudolf Vilém Peřina; 1945–2018), American diplomat
- Václav Peřina (born 1945), Czech cross-country skier
