= Santaniello =

Santaniello is a surname of Italian origin. People with this surname include:

- Andrew J. Santaniello Jr. (1926–1986), member of the Connecticut Senate
- Angelo G. Santaniello (1924–2015), Justice of the Connecticut Supreme Court
- Emanuele Santaniello (born 1990), Italian professional footballer
