= Adrian Stoian =

Romanian footballer

Personal information
- Full name: Adrian Marius Stoian
- Date of birth: 11 February 1991 (age 35)
- Place of birth: Craiova, Romania
- Height: 1.77 m (5 ft 10 in)
- Position: Winger

Youth career
- 2006–2008: Școala de Fotbal Gheorghe Popescu
- 2009–2010: Roma

Senior career*
Years	Team	Apps	(Gls)
2009–2012	Roma	1	(0)
2010–2011	→ Pescara (loan)	12	(1)
2011–2012	→ Bari (loan)	29	(5)
2012–2015	Chievo	28	(3)
2013–2014	→ Genoa (loan)	7	(0)
2014	→ Bari (loan)	8	(0)
2015	→ Crotone (loan)	16	(1)
2015–2019	Crotone	109	(10)
2019	FCSB	2	(0)
2019–2020	Livorno	3	(0)
2020–2021	Viitorul Constanța	4	(0)
2021	Ascoli	3	(0)
2021	Chindia Târgoviște	5	(0)
Total		227	(20)

International career
2007–2008	Romania U17	16	(6)
2008–2011	Romania U19	11	(4)
2009–2012	Romania U21	7	(0)
2013–2018	Romania	2	(0)
- * Club domestic league appearances and goals

Adrian Marius Stoian (born 11 February 1991) is a Romanian former professional footballer who played as a midfielder.

== Club career ==
Stoian started his career at Gheorghe Popescu's football school, which he joined in 2006.

=== Roma ===
In 2009, he joined Serie A team A.S. Roma. He made his Serie A debut on 21 March 2009 against Juventus FC as a substitute for Mirko Vučinić in the last minutes of the game.

Stoian spent the 2010–11 season on loan at Pescara, but he did not manage to impress due to an injury that sidelined him for good part of the year.

==== Loan to Bari ====
On 5 August 2011, Stoian joined A.S. Bari on a season-long loan deal that bring teammates Alessandro Crescenzi and Simone Sini to the team too. In order to formalize the deal, Stoian also signed a new three-year contract with €86,700 annual gross wage.

In December, Stoian had a great game against Brescia, when he scored two goals in a 3–1 victory. On 14 January 2012, he closed the scoring in the 2–0 victory against A.S. Varese. On 11 March, Stoian brought his team the victory, with a last minute goal against Reggina Calcio. He finished an impressive 2011–12 season scoring five goals from 31 games for Bari.

On 22 June 2012, A.S. Bari activated a buy-out clause in his contract for €300K in co-ownership deal and Stoian signed for them. A week later, Roma bought him back from Bari for a fee of €1 million.

=== Chievo ===
In the summer of 2012, after an excellent season in Serie B, Stoian joined Chievo Verona in another co-ownership deal for €500,000, in a deal that involved Chievo midfielder Michael Bradley going the other way.

His first goal in Serie A came on 31 October later that year, in a 2–0 home win against Pescara. It was also the first goal of Stoian for his new club. In January 2015 Stoian was signed by Serie B club F.C. Crotone in a temporary deal.

In June 2015 Chievo acquired Stoian for free. Stoian's contract was canceled in a mutual consent on 21 August.

=== Crotone ===
On 25 August 2015, Stoian was signed by Crotone on a free transfer. He signed a three-year deal.

=== Livorno ===
On 19 August 2019, he signed with Serie B club Livorno.

=== Ascoli ===
On 12 January 2021 he returned to Italy and signed with Ascoli.

== International career ==
Stoian made his international debut against Trinidad & Tobago, playing the last ten minutes of a friendly game on 4 June 2013.

== Career statistics ==
=== Club ===
Appearances and goals by club, season and competition
Club	Season	League			National cup (Note: Includes Coppa Italia, Cupa României)		Europe		Other		Total	
Club	Season	Division	Apps	Goals	Apps	Goals	Apps	Goals	Apps	Goals	Apps	Goals
Roma	2008–09	Serie A	1	0	0	0	—		—		1	0
Pescara (loan)	2010–11	Serie B	12	1	1	0	—		—		13	1
Bari (loan)	2011–12	Serie B	29	5	2	0	—		—		31	5
Chievo	2012–13	Serie A	20	3	1	0	—		—		21	3
Chievo	2013–14	Serie A	8	0	0	0	—		—		8	0
Chievo	Total		28	3	1	0	—		—		29	3
Genoa (loan)	2013–14	Serie A	7	0	0	0	—		—		7	0
Bari (loan)	2014–15	Serie B	8	0	2	0	—		—		10	0
Crotone (loan)	2014–15	Serie B	16	1	0	0	—		—		16	1
Crotone	2015–16	Serie B	33	5	1	0	—		—		34	5
Crotone	2016–17	Serie A	27	3	1	0	—		—		28	3
Crotone	2017–18	Serie A	32	2	2	0	—		—		34	2
Crotone	2018–19	Serie B	17	0	2	2	—		—		19	2
Crotone	Total		125	11	6	2	—		—		131	13
FCSB	2018–19	Liga I	2	0	—		—		—		2	0
Livorno	2019–20	Serie B	3	0	—		—		—		3	0
Viitorul Constanța	2020–21	Liga I	4	0	1	0	—		—		5	0
Ascoli	2020–21	Serie B	3	0	—		—		—		3	0
Chindia Târgoviște	2021–22	Liga I	5	0	2	0	—		—		7	0
Career total			227	20	15	2	0	0	—		242	22

=== International ===
Appearances and goals by national team and year
National team	Year	Apps	Goals
Romania	2013	1	0
Romania	2018	1	0
Total		2	0
