= Simone Sini =

Italian footballer

Personal information
- Date of birth: 9 April 1992 (age 34)
- Place of birth: Sesto San Giovanni, Italy
- Height: 1.84 m (6 ft 0 in)
- Position: Centre back

Team information
- Current team: Lodigiani
- Number: 23

Youth career
- 2008–2010: Roma

Senior career*
Years	Team	Apps	(Gls)
2010–2015	Roma	0	(0)
2010–2011	→ Lecce (loan)	2	(0)
2011–2012	→ Bari (loan)	2	(0)
2012	→ Livorno (loan)	7	(0)
2012–2013	→ Pro Vercelli (loan)	18	(0)
2013–2014	→ Perugia (loan)	26	(0)
2014–2015	→ Pisa (loan)	32	(1)
2015–2017	Virtus Entella	45	(2)
2017–2019	Viterbese	47	(2)
2019–2020	Ternana	13	(1)
2020–2021	Ascoli	5	(0)
2021–2023	Alessandria	44	(0)
2022	→ Renate (loan)	13	(0)
2023–2024	Monterosi	34	(1)
2024	Chieti	9	(1)
2024–	Lodigiani	52	(6)

International career
2008	Italy U16	9	(1)
2008–2009	Italy U17	24	(3)
2009–2010	Italy U18	7	(0)
2010–2011	Italy U19	7	(0)
2011–2012	Italy U20	6	(0)
2011	Italy U21	1	(0)
- * Club domestic league appearances and goals as of 25 Juny 2026

Simone Sini (born 9 April 1992) is an Italian footballer who plays as a centre back for Serie D club Lodigiani.

== Club career ==
=== Roma ===
Sini joined Lecce on a season-long loan deal with the option for Lecce to co-own the player at the end of the season for €1 million. Andrea Bertolacci also joined Lecce in similar deal. He made his Serie A debut on the first day of the 2010–11 season in a 4–0 drubbing away to Milan.

On 5 August 2011, he joined A.S. Bari on a long season loan deal that brought teammates Alessandro Crescenzi and Adrian Stoian to the team too. Bari also had option to co-own the player for €300,000. Sini extended the contract with Roma to 2014 as part of the loan. He earned €141,000 in gross for 2013–14 season (about €80,000 in net).

On 31 January 2012, Sini left for Livorno in another temporary deal, with an option to sign half of the "card" for €400,000. For the 2012–13 season, he moved on loan to Serie B team F.C. Pro Vercelli 1892 on 9 August 2012.

=== Virtus Entella ===
On 15 July 2015, Sini signed a two-year contract with Serie B club Virtus Entella.

=== Ascoli ===
On 24 September 2020, he moved to Ascoli on a 2-year contract.

=== Alessandria ===
On 27 January 2021, he signed with Alessandria. On 30 January 2022, he was loaned to Renate.

== International career ==
Sini was a member of Italy national under-17 football team in 2009 UEFA European Under-17 Football Championship. He played all 3 matches in the qualification, 3 goals and a brace in elite qualification and 4 games and a goal in the final tournament. He played all 5 games in 2009 FIFA U-17 World Cup.

On 10 August 2011, he made his debut with the Italy U-21 team, in a friendly match against Switzerland.
