= Michele Fornasier =

Italian footballer (born 1993)

Personal information
- Date of birth: 22 August 1993 (age 33)
- Place of birth: Vittorio Veneto, Italy
- Height: 1.86 m (6 ft 1 in)
- Position: Centre-back

Team information
- Current team: Nardò
- Number: 3

Youth career
- Vittorio Falmec
- Conegliano
- 2007–2009: Fiorentina
- 2009–2013: Manchester United

Senior career*
Years	Team	Apps	(Gls)
2013–2015	Sampdoria	10	(0)
2015–2019	Pescara	89	(2)
2019	→ Venezia (loan)	8	(0)
2019–2020	Parma	0	(0)
2019–2020	→ Trapani (loan)	20	(0)
2020–2021	Cremonese	1	(0)
2021–2024	Monopoli	45	(1)
2024–	Nardò	3	(0)

International career
2008	Italy U16	1	(0)
2011–2012	Italy U19	2	(1)
- * Club domestic league appearances and goals as of 17 November 2024

Michele Fornasier (born 22 August 1993) is an Italian footballer who plays as a centre-back for Serie D club Nardò.

== Club career ==
=== Early career ===
Born in Vittorio Veneto, Fornasier joined Fiorentina in 2007, but moved to England two years later, signing with Manchester United. Shortly after, Fiorentina filed a formal complaint to FIFA about the transfer. However, no action was taken by FIFA after Fiorentina failed to supply evidence for the case.

=== Manchester United ===
When playing for United, Fornasier lifted the 2010–11 FA Youth Cup and appeared with the Under-21 squad; he also appeared in the Dallas Cup twice (2012 and 2013) He left the club in June 2013 after making no first-team appearances.

=== Sampdoria ===
On 2 July 2013, Fornasier signed with U.C. Sampdoria. He made his professional debut on 5 December, starting in a 4–1 home win over Verona.

On 9 February 2014, Fornasier made his Serie A debut, starting in a 1–0 win over Cagliari. Fornasier ended the season with 10 appearances.

=== Pescara ===
On 23 January 2015, Fornasier was signed by Pescara in a temporary deal with an option to purchase. On 27 June, the Dolphins excised the option, with Lucas Torreira moved to Sampdoria effectively on 1 July 2016.

==== Venezia (loan) ====
On 22 January 2019, Fornasier signed to Venezia on loan with an option to buy.

=== Parma ===
==== Trapani (loan) ====
On 16 August 2019, Fornasier signed to Serie A club Parma and after he joined Serie B club Trapani on loan until 30 June 2020.

=== Cremonese ===
On 3 October 2020, he moved to Serie B club Cremonese. He only made one league appearance for Cremonese in the 2020–21 season as he was fighting injuries. His contract with Cremonese was terminated by mutual consent on 30 August 2021.

=== Monopoli ===
On 21 September 2021, he signed a three-year contract with Serie C club Monopoli.

== International career ==
Fornasier was a youth international for Italy.

== Career statistics ==
=== Club ===
As of 23 August 2023

Appearances by club, season and competition
Club	Season	League			National cup		Total	
Club	Season	Division	Apps	Goals	Apps	Goals	Apps	Goals
Sampdoria	2013–14	Serie A	10	0	2	0	12	0
Sampdoria	2014–15	Serie A	0	0	1	0	1	0
Sampdoria	Total		10	0	3	0	13	0
Pescara	2014–15	Serie B	14	0	0	0	14	0
Pescara	2015–16	Serie B	38	2	2	0	40	2
Pescara	2016–17	Serie A	22	0	0	0	22	0
Pescara	2017–18	Serie B	15	0	1	0	16	0
Pescara	Total		89	2	3	0	92	2
Venezia (loan)	2018–19	Serie B	8	0	0	0	8	0
Trapani (loan)	2019–20	Serie B	20	0	0	0	20	0
Cremonese	2020–21	Serie B	1	0	1	0	2	0
Monopoli	2021–22	Serie C	11	0	0	0	11	0
Monopoli	2022–23	Serie C	14	1	0	0	14	1
Monopoli	Total		25	1	0	0	25	1
Career total			153	3	7	0	160	3
