= Gastón Brugman =

Uruguayan footballer (born 1992)

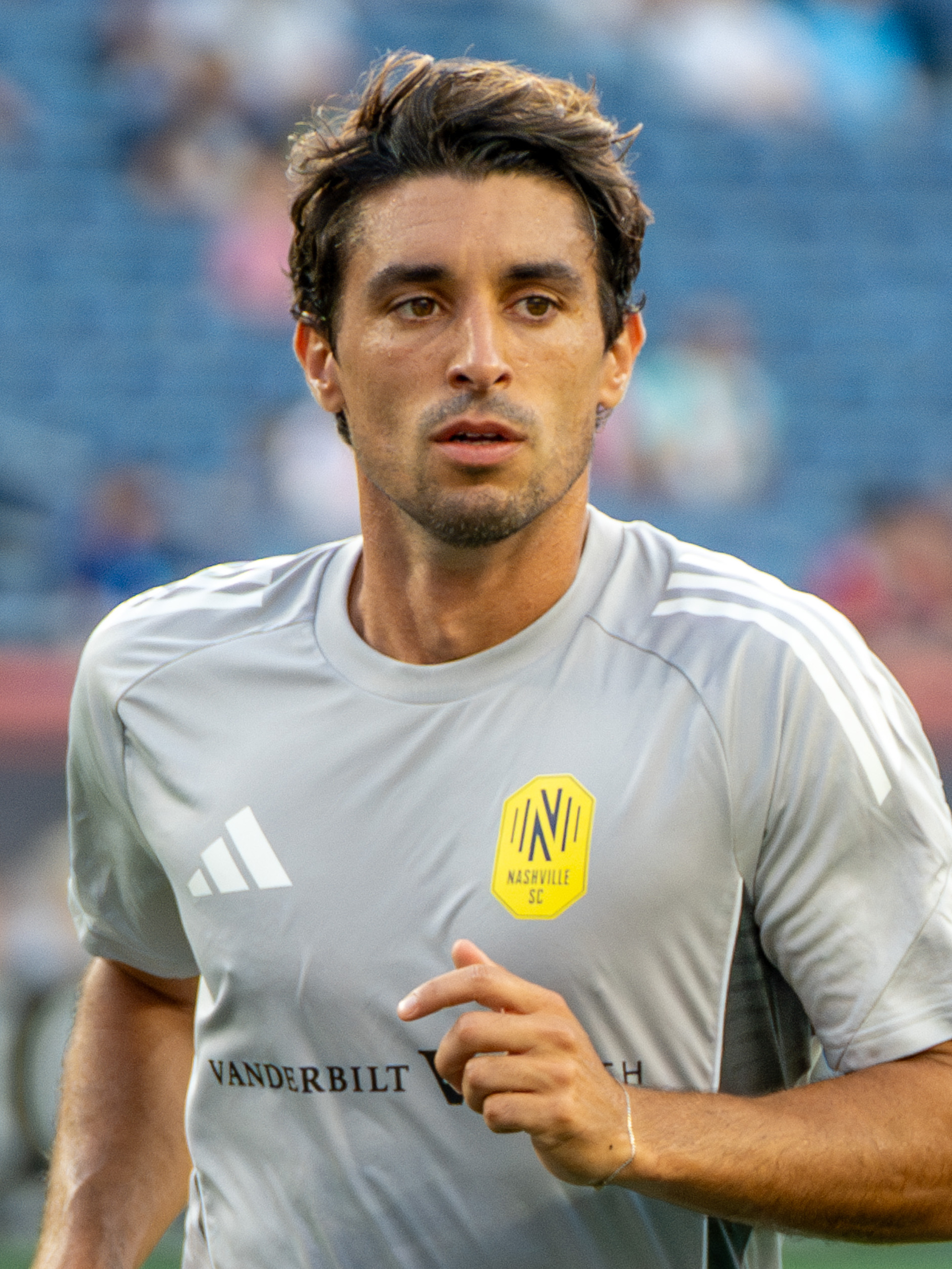
- Brugman with Nashville SC in 2025

Personal information
- Full name: Gastón Brugman Duarte
- Date of birth: 7 September 1992 (age 34)
- Place of birth: Rosario, Uruguay
- Height: 1.78 m (5 ft 10 in)
- Position: Midfielder

Team information
- Current team: Modena
- Number: 16

Youth career
- Estudiantes de Rosario
- Peñarol
- Empoli

Senior career*
Years	Team	Apps	(Gls)
2011–2012	Empoli	20	(2)
2012–2020	Pescara	153	(18)
2013	→ Grosseto (loan)	12	(0)
2015–2016	→ Palermo (loan)	14	(0)
2019–2020	→ Parma (loan)	11	(0)
2020–2022	Parma	39	(1)
2021–2022	→ Oviedo (loan)	33	(3)
2022–2024	LA Galaxy	58	(5)
2025	Nashville SC	24	(0)
2026	Pescara	17	(1)
2026–	Modena	1	(0)

International career
2009	Uruguay U17	4	(0)
- * Club domestic league appearances and goals as of 22 August 2026

Gastón Brugman Duarte (born 7 September 1992) is a Uruguayan professional footballer who plays as a midfielder for Serie B club Modena.

== Club career ==
=== Early career ===
Born in Rosario, Uruguay, Brugman began playing football in Peñarol's youth system. He moved to Italy to join Empoli in 2011. He made his debut in Empoli's 0–1 defeat to Modena coming on as 58th-minute substitute replacing Riccardo Nardini.

=== Pescara and loans ===
In summer 2012, he moved to Serie A club Pescara. The following January, he was loaned to Grosseto in Serie B. In the 2013–14 season, coach Pasquale Marino made him a regular starter at Pescara, who had been relegated to Serie B. Having further blossomed under coach Serse Cosmi, Brugman's play was likened to that of Andrea Pirlo and former Pescara player Marco Verratti.

In summer 2014, he was close to a transfer to Villarreal, which was canceled due to a torn anterior cruciate ligament in his left knee.

=== Palermo ===
On 10 July 2015, he moved on loan to Serie A club Palermo, with a buyout clause.

=== Parma ===
On 1 August 2019, Serie A side Parma announced the signing of Brugman on a season-long loan with an obligation to buy.

==== Loan to Real Oviedo ====
On 1 September 2021, he joined Spanish club Oviedo on loan.

=== LA Galaxy ===
On 6 July 2022, Brugman joined Major League Soccer club LA Galaxy on a three-and-a-half-year contract. He was the MVP of MLS Cup 2024, providing the assist for the opening goal scored by Joseph Paintsil.

=== Nashville SC ===
On 19 December 2024, Brugman was traded to MLS club Nashville SC.

=== Return to Pescara ===
On 27 January 2026, Brugman returned to Italy to play for Pescara.

== International career ==
In November 2009, he made his debut for Uruguay U17 in a match against Spain U17, which Spain won on penalties.

== Career statistics ==
=== Club ===
As of match played 9 November 2025

Appearances and goals by club, season and competition
Club	Season	League			National cup (Note: Includes Coppa Italia, Copa del Rey, U.S. Open Cup)		Continental		Other		Total	
Club	Season	Division	Apps	Goals	Apps	Goals	Apps	Goals	Apps	Goals	Apps	Goals
Empoli	2010-11	Serie B	2	1	0	0	—		—		2	1
Empoli	2011-12	Serie B	18	1	1	0	—		0	0	19	1
Empoli	Total		20	2	1	0	—		0	0	21	2
Pescara	2012-13	Serie A	0	0	1	0	—		—		1	0
Pescara	2013-14	Serie B	35	4	2	0	—		—		37	4
Pescara	2014-15	Serie B	19	2	0	0	—		5 (Note: Appearance(s) in Serie B Promotion play-offs)	0	24	2
Pescara	2015-16	Serie B	0	0	0	0	—		0	0	0	0
Pescara	2016-17	Serie A	27	1	1	0	—		—		28	1
Pescara	2017-18	Serie B	41	7	3	1	—		—		44	8
Pescara	2018-19	Serie B	31	4	2	1	—		2	0	35	5
Pescara	2019-20	Serie B	0	0	0	0	—		0	0	0	0
Pescara	Total		153	18	9	2	—		7	0	169	20
Grosseto (loan)	2012-13	Serie B	12	0	0	0	—		—		12	0
Palermo (loan)	2015-16	Serie A	14	0	0	0	—		—		14	0
Parma (loan)	2019-20	Serie A	23	0	2	0	—		—		25	0
Parma	2020-21	Serie A	26	1	2	0	—		—		28	1
Parma	2021-22	Serie B	1	0	0	0	—		—		1	0
Parma	Total		27	1	2	0	—		—		29	1
Oviedo (loan)	2021-22	Segunda División	33	3	0	0	—		—		33	3
LA Galaxy	2022	MLS	14	3	0	0	—		2 (Note: Appearance(s) in MLS Cup playoffs)	0	16	3
LA Galaxy	2023	MLS	22	2	3	1	1 (Note: Appearance(s) in Leagues Cup)	0	—		26	3
LA Galaxy	2024	MLS	22	0	0	0	2	0	5	0	29	0
LA Galaxy	Total		58	5	3	1	3	0	7	0	71	6
Nashville SC	2025	MLS	24	0	3	0	—		2	0	29	0
Career total			364	29	20	3	3	0	16	0	403	32

== Honours ==
LA Galaxy

- MLS Cup: 2024
- Western Conference (Playoffs): 2024

Nashville SC

- U.S. Open Cup: 2025

Individual

- MLS Cup MVP: 2024
