= Cristiano Biraghi =

Italian footballer (born 1992)

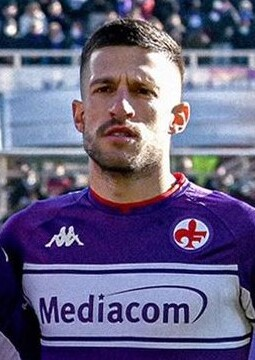
- Biraghi with Fiorentina in 2022

Personal information
- Date of birth: 1 September 1992 (age 34)
- Place of birth: Cernusco sul Naviglio, Italy
- Height: 1.86 m (6 ft 1 in)
- Position: Left-back

Team information
- Current team: Torino
- Number: 3

Youth career
- 2005–2011: Inter Milan
- 2007–2008: → Pro Sesto (loan)

Senior career*
Years	Team	Apps	(Gls)
2010–2012	Inter Milan	0	(0)
2011–2012	→ Juve Stabia (loan)	11	(0)
2012–2014	Cittadella	33	(0)
2013–2014	→ Catania (loan)	23	(0)
2014–2016	Inter Milan	0	(0)
2014–2015	→ Chievo (loan)	18	(0)
2015–2016	→ Granada (loan)	32	(0)
2016–2018	Pescara	37	(1)
2017–2018	→ Fiorentina (loan)	34	(1)
2018–2025	Fiorentina	178	(11)
2019–2020	→ Inter Milan (loan)	26	(2)
2025	→ Torino (loan)	15	(0)
2025–	Torino	14	(0)

International career
2010–2011	Italy U19	7	(0)
2010–2015	Italy U21	10	(0)
2018–2023	Italy	16	(1)
- * Club domestic league appearances and goals as of 2 May 2026 (UTC)

Cristiano Biraghi (Italian pronunciation: [kriˈstjaːno biˈraːɡi]; born 1 September 1992) is an Italian professional footballer who plays as a left-back for Serie A club Torino.

== Club career ==
=== Youth years ===
Born in Cernusco sul Naviglio, Milan, Lombardy, Biraghi began his career with Inter Milan, playing in their youth teams from 2005 onwards. For the 2007–08 season he spent time at Pro Sesto alongside his club compatriots and youth products. He started his career as a midfielder but later became a left back. He played a few friendlies for the club and participated in their 2010 summer tour, scoring a goal in the Pirelli Cup, helping them to a 3–0 victory over Manchester City.

=== Inter Milan ===
Biraghi made his first team debut in a competitive game on 24 November 2010, against Twente in the 2010–11 UEFA Champions League, replacing Goran Pandev. Before that match Inter had lost a number of first team players through injury.

Biraghi would be given a starting berth in Inter's next game in the Champions League, on 7 December 2010, against Werder Bremen in what would be a 3–0 home win for the German side, with the likes of Davide Santon moving to wing forward and Cristian Chivu unable to play due to an injury.

In July 2011, he was loaned to Serie B club Juve Stabia. On 27 August 2011, he made his debut for the club in the first league match of the season, a 2–1 loss against Empoli.

=== Cittadella ===
In summer 2012, Biraghi was signed by Serie B club A.S. Cittadella on loan, with an option to sign half of the registration rights. In June 2013, Cittadella exercised the option for €150,000. However, Inter also paid a subsidy (Italian: premi di valorizzazione) of €50,000 to Cittadella for the loan.

Biraghi was loaned to Catania on 2 September 2013 for €300,000.

=== Return to Inter Milan and loans out ===
In June 2014, Inter bought back Biraghi from Cittadella for €610,000 (€600,000 plus the remain 50% registration rights of Simone Pecorini). He signed a new four-year contract with Inter in 2014. However, he spent 2 seasons on loan to other clubs before he became a make-weight of another signing.

He signed a two-year loan deal with Chievo on 6 July 2014.

On 27 August 2015, Biraghi moved to La Liga side Granada CF, after agreeing to a one-year loan deal.

=== Pescara ===
On 11 July 2016, Biraghi was sold to Serie A newcomers Pescara in a permanent deal. On the same day Pescara also signed Rey Manaj on loan, as well as Gianluca Caprari, who was sold to Inter but loaned back to Pescara for a season. Pescara were relegated at the end of season.

=== Fiorentina ===
On 15 August 2017, Biraghi joined Serie A club Fiorentina on loan, with an obligation to buy the player.

In the 2023 UEFA Europa Conference League final against West Ham United on 7 June 2023, when preparing to take a corner, Biraghi was struck in the head with an object thrown by a member in the crowd, causing him to bleed and finish the match with a bandage, where Fiorentina eventually lost 2–1. On 29 May 2024, in the 2024 UEFA Europa Conference League final, Biraghi started in Fiorentina's 1–0 extra-time defeat to Olympiacos.

On 24 June 2025, he departed Fiorentina as captain after eight seasons, 266 appearances, and 15 goals when he joined Torino permanently.

=== Second return to Inter Milan ===
In August 2019, Biraghi was re-signed by Inter in a temporary deal, with Dalbert moving in the opposite direction. Inter had an option to sign Biraghi from Fiorentina in a permanent deal in 2020 for a reported €12 million fee, but opted not to take this up.

=== Loan to Torino and permanent signing ===
On 3 February 2025, Biraghi was loaned to Torino with an option to buy. On 24 June, Torino exercised their option to buy and signed a two-year permanent contract with Biraghi.

== International career ==
Under the new regime of Ciro Ferrara, he made his U21 debut on 17 November 2010, as starting left back in the friendly match that Italy won 2–1 against Turkey. In that match he also featured alongside former Inter teammates Giulio Donati and Luca Caldirola in the defensive line.

He received his first call-up along with Felice Natalino in August 2010 for the 2011 UEFA European Under-21 Football Championship qualification. In the next month, he made his U19 debut against Serbia. Before that, he received only one call-up in 2009 from the U18 team.

He was given his first senior international call-up for Italy in September 2018, by manager Roberto Mancini, for Italy's opening UEFA Nations League matches against Poland and Portugal later that month. He made his senior international debut in Italy's 1–1 home draw against the former on 7 September, in their UEFA Nations League opener. On 14 October, he scored his first goal for Italy on his third cap in the return UEFA Nations League match away to Poland to secure a 1–0 win in the 92nd minute, which secured Italy's safety in the group; Biraghi dedicated his goal to former Fiorentina teammate Davide Astori who died earlier that year.

== Career statistics ==
=== Club ===
As of match played 2 May 2026

Appearances and goals by club, season and competition
Club	Season	League			National cup (Note: Includes Coppa Italia, Copa del Rey)		Europe		Other		Total	
Club	Season	Division	Apps	Goals	Apps	Goals	Apps	Goals	Apps	Goals	Apps	Goals
Internazionale	2010–11	Serie A	0	0	0	0	2 (Note: Appearances in UEFA Champions League)	0	—		2	0
Juve Stabia (loan)	2011–12	Serie B	11	0	1	0	—		—		12	0
Cittadella	2012–13	Serie B	33	0	3	0	—		—		36	0
Catania (loan)	2013–14	Serie A	23	0	0	0	—		—		23	0
Internazionale	2014–15	Serie A	0	0	0	0	—		0	0	0	0
Chievo (loan)	2014–15	Serie A	18	0	1	0	—		—		19	0
Granada (loan)	2015–16	La Liga	32	0	1	0	—		—		33	0
Pescara	2016–17	Serie A	35	1	2	0	—		—		37	1
Fiorentina (loan)	2017–18	Serie A	34	1	1	0	—		—		35	1
Fiorentina	2018–19	Serie A	36	1	4	0	—		—		40	1
Fiorentina	2020–21	Serie A	35	1	3	0	—		—		38	1
Fiorentina	2021–22	Serie A	37	4	5	1	—		—		42	5
Fiorentina	2022–23	Serie A	33	2	4	0	15 (Note: Appearances in UEFA Europa Conference League)	1	—		52	3
Fiorentina	2023–24	Serie A	29	2	3	0	13	1	1 (Note: Appearance in Supercoppa Italiana)	0	46	3
Fiorentina	2024–25	Serie A	8	1	0	0	5	0	—		13	1
Fiorentina	Fiorentina total		212	12	20	1	33	2	1	0	266	15
Internazionale (loan)	2019–20	Serie A	26	2	3	0	8 (Note: Four appearances in UEFA Champions League, four appearances and one goal in UEFA Europa League)	1	—		37	3
Torino (loan)	2024–25	Serie A	15	0	—		—		—		15	0
Torino	2025–26	Serie A	14	0	1	0	—		—		15	0
Torino	Torino total		29	0	1	0	—		—		30	0
Career total			419	15	32	1	43	3	1	0	495	19

=== International ===
Appearances and goals by national team and year
National team	Year	Apps	Goals
Italy	2018	4	1
Italy	2019	3	0
Italy	2020	2	0
Italy	2021	2	0
Italy	2022	2	0
Italy	2023	3	0
Total		16	1

Scores and results list Italy's goal tally first, score column indicates score after each Biraghi goal.

List of international goals scored by Cristiano Biraghi
No.	Date	Venue	Opponent	Score	Result	Competition
1.	14 October 2018	Stadion Śląski, Chorzów, Poland	Poland	1–0	1–0	2018–19 UEFA Nations League A

== Honours ==
Inter Milan

- Coppa Italia: 2010–11
- UEFA Europa League runner-up: 2019–20

Fiorentina

- Coppa Italia runner-up: 2022–23
- UEFA Europa Conference League runner-up: 2022–23, 2023–24

Italy U21

- UEFA U-21 Championship runner-up: 2013

Individual

- Serie A Goal of the Month: February 2023
- UEFA Europa Conference League Team of the Season: 2022–23, 2023–24
