= Alessandro Bruno =

Italian footballer (born 1983)

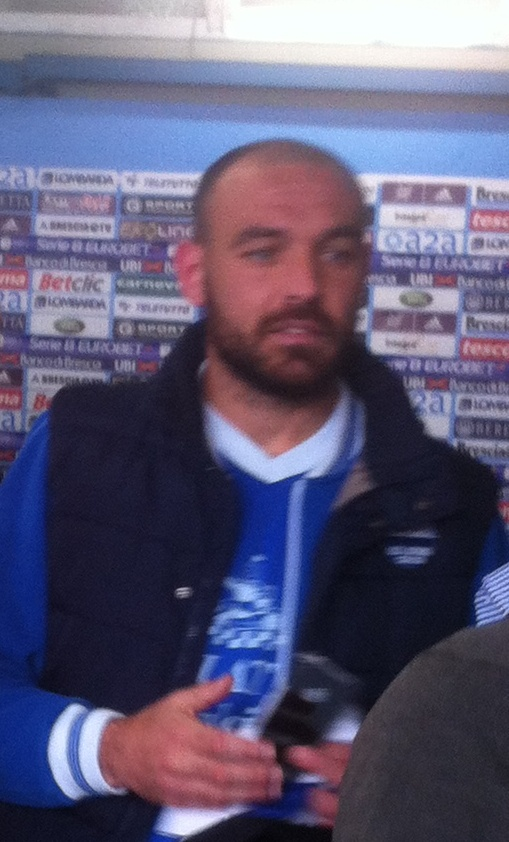
- Alessandro Bruno in 2014

Personal information
- Date of birth: July 4, 1983 (age 43)
- Place of birth: Benevento, Italy
- Height: 1.78 m (5 ft 10 in)
- Position: Midfielder

Senior career*
Years	Team	Apps	(Gls)
2001–2004	Benevento	33	(0)
2004–2005	Pro Vasto	31	(0)
2005–2006	Taranto	10	(0)
2006	Nocerina	12	(0)
2006–2008	Val Di Sangro	58	(1)
2008–2010	Catanzaro	52	(0)
2010–2013	Nocerina	92	(0)
2013–2015	Latina	61	(2)
2015–2017	Pescara	37	(0)
2017–2019	Livorno	38	(1)
2019–2020	Pescara	23	(0)
2020–2021	Casarano	28	(0)
2021–2023	San Nicolò Notaresco	48	(0)

Managerial career
- 2023–2024: San Nicolò Notaresco
- 2024: Arzignano
- 2025: Latina
- * Club domestic league appearances and goals as of 31 July 2020

Alessandro Bruno (born 4 July 1983) is an Italian football coach and former player who played as a midfielder.

== Playing career ==
On 23 January 2019 he returned to Pescara after 1.5 years at Livorno. On 29 August 2020 he moved to Casarano.

== Coaching career ==
In February 2023, Bruno, then a player for Serie D club San Nicolò Notaresco, was promoted to head coach for the remainder of the season following the resignation of the previous boss Tiziano De Patre. After saving the club from relegation, he was confirmed for one more season, guiding the club to a mid-table placement. He successively departed from the club in May 2024. A few weeks later, Bruno was hired as the new head coach of Serie C club Arzignano, replacing Simone Bentivoglio. He was dismissed on 14 October 2024, leaving Arzignano dead last in the league table after nine games.

On 7 April 2025, Bruno agreed to return to Latina as the club's new head coach until the end of the season. After being confirmed in charge of Latina for the 2025–26 Serie C campaign, he was dismissed on 1 December 2025.
