= Gabriele Aldegani =

Italian footballer (born 1976)

Personal information
- Full name: Gabriele Aldegani
- Date of birth: 10 May 1976 (age 50)
- Place of birth: Venice, Italy
- Height: 1.95 m (6 ft 5 in)
- Position: Goalkeeper

Team information
- Current team: Latvia (GK coach)

Youth career
- –1994: US Miranese
- 1994–1995: AC Milan

Senior career*
Years	Team	Apps	(Gls)
1993–1994	US Miranese	3	(0)
1995–2003	AC Milan	0	(0)
1997–1998	→ Prato (loan)	34	(0)
1998–1999	→ Monza (loan)	37	(0)
1999–2000	→ Treviso (loan)	28	(0)
2000–2001	→ Monza (loan)	15	(0)
2001	→ Alavés (loan)	0	(0)
2001–2002	→ Cosenza (loan)	23	(0)
2002–2003	→ Livorno (loan)	2	(0)
2003–2004	Rimini	26	(0)
2004–2006	Piacenza	34	(0)
2006–2007	Bari	0	(0)
2007	Avellino	0	(0)
2007–2009	Chievo	2	(0)
2010	Grosseto	4	(0)
2010–2011	Benevento	21	(0)
2011	→ Cremonese (loan)	5	(0)
2012–2014	Nocerina	13	(0)
2013–2014	→ Livorno (loan)	1	(0)
2014–2017	Pescara	1	(0)
Total		249	(0)

Managerial career
- 2017–2018: Pescara U19 (GK coach)
- 2018–2020: Pescara (GK coach)
- 2021: Pordenone (GK coach)
- 2023–2024: FC U Craiova (GK coach)
- 2025–: Latvia (GK coach)
- * Club domestic league appearances and goals

Gabriele Aldegani (born 10 May 1976) is an Italian former professional footballer who played as a goalkeeper, who serves as a goalkeeping coach for Latvia national team.

== Football career ==
Aldegani started his senior career at Miranese of Serie D. in 1994 he was signed by A.C. Milan reserve team in 1994. He spent 6 seasons in temporary deals in Serie B and Serie C1 clubs. In 2003, he was signed by Rimini of Serie C1; in the next season he moved to Serie B club Piacenza. In 2006, he was signed by Bari. In July 2007 he was signed by Avellino. Aldegani was an unused bench against Ascoli in 2007–08 Coppa Italia before leaving the club in the same transfer window.

=== Chievo ===
Chievo called Aldegani for backup goalkeeper on 30 August 2007, although he wore no.1 in the 2008–09 season. He made his Serie A debut on 31 May 2009 against S.S.C. Napoli, the last match day of the season.

=== Grosseto ===
He signed for Grosseto on 10 February 2010.

=== Benevento & Cremonese ===
In summer 2010 he was signed by Benevento Calcio. On 31 January 2011 he was signed by U.S. Cremonese in temporary deal.

=== Nocerina & Livorno ===
In February 2012 he was signed by A.S.G. Nocerina on free transfer. On 31 January 2013 he was signed by A.S. Livorno Calcio in temporary deal, with Alfonso De Lucia moved to opposite direction. On 1 August 2013 the temporary deal was renewed; Aldegani played once for Livorno in 2013–14 Serie A.

=== Pescara ===
Aldegani became a free agent on 1 July 2014. On 18 September 2014 he was signed by Serie B club Delfino Pescara 1936. He immediately received call-up from the coach.

== Honours ==
AC Milan

- Serie A: 1995–96
- Supercoppa Italiana runner-up: 1996

Chievo

- Serie B: 2007–08
