= Gianluca Caprari =

Italian footballer (born 1993)

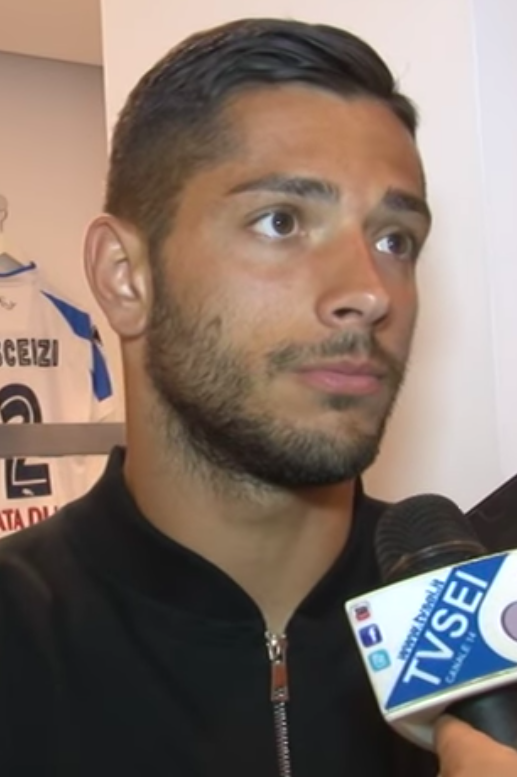
- Caprari in 2017

Personal information
- Date of birth: 30 July 1993 (age 33)
- Place of birth: Rome, Italy
- Height: 1.76 m (5 ft 9 in)
- Position: Forward

Team information
- Current team: Padova
- Number: 24

Youth career
- 2003–2011: Roma

Senior career*
Years	Team	Apps	(Gls)
2011–2012	Roma	3	(0)
2012–2013	Pescara	38	(5)
2013–2014	Roma	1	(0)
2014–2016	Pescara	71	(16)
2016–2017	Inter Milan	0	(0)
2016–2017	→ Pescara (loan)	35	(9)
2017–2022	Sampdoria	73	(14)
2020	→ Parma (loan)	12	(2)
2020–2021	→ Benevento (loan)	30	(5)
2021–2022	→ Hellas Verona (loan)	35	(12)
2022–2023	Hellas Verona	0	(0)
2022–2023	→ Monza (loan)	37	(5)
2023–2026	Monza	48	(3)
2026–	Padova	11	(1)

International career^{‡}
2011	Italy U18	4	(1)
2011	Italy U19	3	(1)
2013	Italy U20	2	(0)
2022–	Italy	1	(0)
- * Club domestic league appearances and goals as of 13 May 2026 ‡ National team caps and goals as of 14 June 2022

Gianluca Caprari (born 30 July 1993) is an Italian professional footballer who plays as a forward for Serie B club Padova. He has also appeared for the Italy national team.

== Club career ==
=== Roma ===
Born in Rome, Italian capital, Caprari started his career at Atletico 2000. He then joined esordienti team of A.S. Roma in 2003. He played for Roma's Allievi Nazionali team at 2010 Torneo Città di Arco, which beat Fiorentina in the final.

Caprari made his first team debut on 8 March 2011, in 2010–11 UEFA Champions League round of 16. He replaced Simone Perrotta in the last minute; his team lost to Shakhtar Donetsk with a 0–3 score.

In the next season he played both legs of the 2011–12 UEFA Europa League play-off round, losing to Slovan Bratislava. He played only one match in Serie A in 2011–12 season, substituting Totti in a 2–0 win over Chievo.

=== Pescara ===
In January 2012, Caprari was sent on loan to Serie B club Pescara in order to allow him to play more first-team football. He scored three goals in 15 matches in 2011–12 season. The club also won promotion to Serie A.

In June 2012 Pescara purchased Caprari in a co-ownership deal for €1.2 million. On 20 June 2013, Roma re-signed him for €2 million by means of a player swap, with Giammario Piscitella and Matteo Politano moving to Pescara for €2 million. Caprari played his first match of his second Roma career on 10 November 2013, against Sassuolo coming on as a substitute.

On 24 January 2014, Caprari returned to Pescara by swapped clubs with Piscitella (both were tagged for €1.5 million)

On 27 June 2015, Roma bought back Politano for €601,000, with Caprari moving to Pescara outright for €125,000.

=== Inter Milan and Sampdoria ===
On 8 July 2016, Caprari was sold to Inter Milan, in a deal involving Cristiano Biraghi moving the other way. He was sent back on loan to Pescara.

=== Sampdoria ===
On 30 June 2017, Caprari joined fellow Serie A club Sampdoria. On 4 November 2019, Gianluca Caprari came off the bench to score the only goal and a stoppage-time winner for Sampdoria against SPAL.

==== Parma (loan) ====
On 31 January 2020, Caprari joined Parma on loan with an option to buy.

==== Benevento (loan) ====
On 4 September 2020, Caprari joined Benevento on loan until 30 June 2021.

=== Hellas Verona ===
On 31 August 2021, Caprari joined Hellas Verona on loan with an option to buy and a conditional obligation to buy. During the 2021–22 season, he scored 12 goals and made 7 assists in the Serie A.

==== Monza (loan) ====
On 21 July 2022, Caprari joined newly-promoted Serie A side Monza on a one-year loan, with a conditional obligation to buy. He made his debut on 8 August, scoring a penalty in a 3–2 Coppa Italia win against Frosinone. Caprari's first Serie A goal for Monza was a volley in a 3–0 away win to Sampdoria on 2 October.

=== Padova ===
On 30 January 2026, Caprari signed with Padova until 30 June 2026, with an option to extend.

== International career ==
Caprari was called up to the Italy senior squad for the 2022 Finalissima against Argentina on 1 June 2022, and for 2022–23 UEFA Nations League group stage matches against Germany, Hungary, England and Germany between 4 and 14 June. He made his debut against Germany on 14 June.

== Career statistics ==
=== Club ===
As of match played 24 May 2025

Appearances and goals by club, season and competition
Club	Season	League			Coppa Italia		Europe		Other		Total	
Club	Season	Division	Apps	Goals	Apps	Goals	Apps	Goals	Apps	Goals	Apps	Goals
Roma	2010–11	Serie A	2	0	1	0	1 (Note: Appearance in UEFA Champions League)	0	—		4	0
Roma	2011–12	Serie A	1	0	0	0	2	0	—		3	0
Roma	Total		3	0	1	0	3	0	0	0	7	0
Pescara	2011–12	Serie B	14	3	0	0	—		—		14	3
Pescara	2012–13	Serie A	24	2	2	0	—		—		26	2
Pescara	Total		38	5	2	0	0	0	0	0	40	5
Roma	2013–14	Serie A	1	0	0	0	—		—		1	0
Pescara	2013–14	Serie B	15	3	0	0	—		—		15	3
Pescara	2014–15	Serie B	18	1	2	1	—		4 (Note: Appearances in Serie B promotion play-offs)	0	24	2
Pescara	2015–16	Serie B	38	13	1	0	—		4	0	43	13
Pescara	Total		71	17	3	1	0	0	8	0	82	18
Pescara (loan)	2016–17	Serie A	35	9	1	0	—		—		36	9
Sampdoria	2017–18	Serie A	34	5	3	2	—		—		37	7
Sampdoria	2018–19	Serie A	21	6	3	0	—		—		24	6
Sampdoria	2019–20	Serie A	18	3	2	1	—		—		20	4
Sampdoria	2021–22	Serie A	0	0	1	0	—		—		1	0
Sampdoria	Total		73	14	9	3	0	0	0	0	82	17
Parma (loan)	2019–20	Serie A	12	2	0	0	—		—		12	2
Benevento (loan)	2020–21	Serie A	30	5	0	0	—		—		30	5
Hellas Verona (loan)	2021–22	Serie A	35	12	1	0	—		—		36	12
Monza (loan)	2022–23	Serie A	37	5	1	1	—		—		38	6
Monza	2023–24	Serie A	6	0	1	0	—		—		7	0
Monza	2024–25	Serie A	34	3	2	1	—		—		36	4
Monza	Total		77	8	4	2	0	0	0	0	81	10
Career total			374	72	21	6	3	0	8	0	407	78
