= Alessandro Crescenzi =

Italian footballer (born 1991)

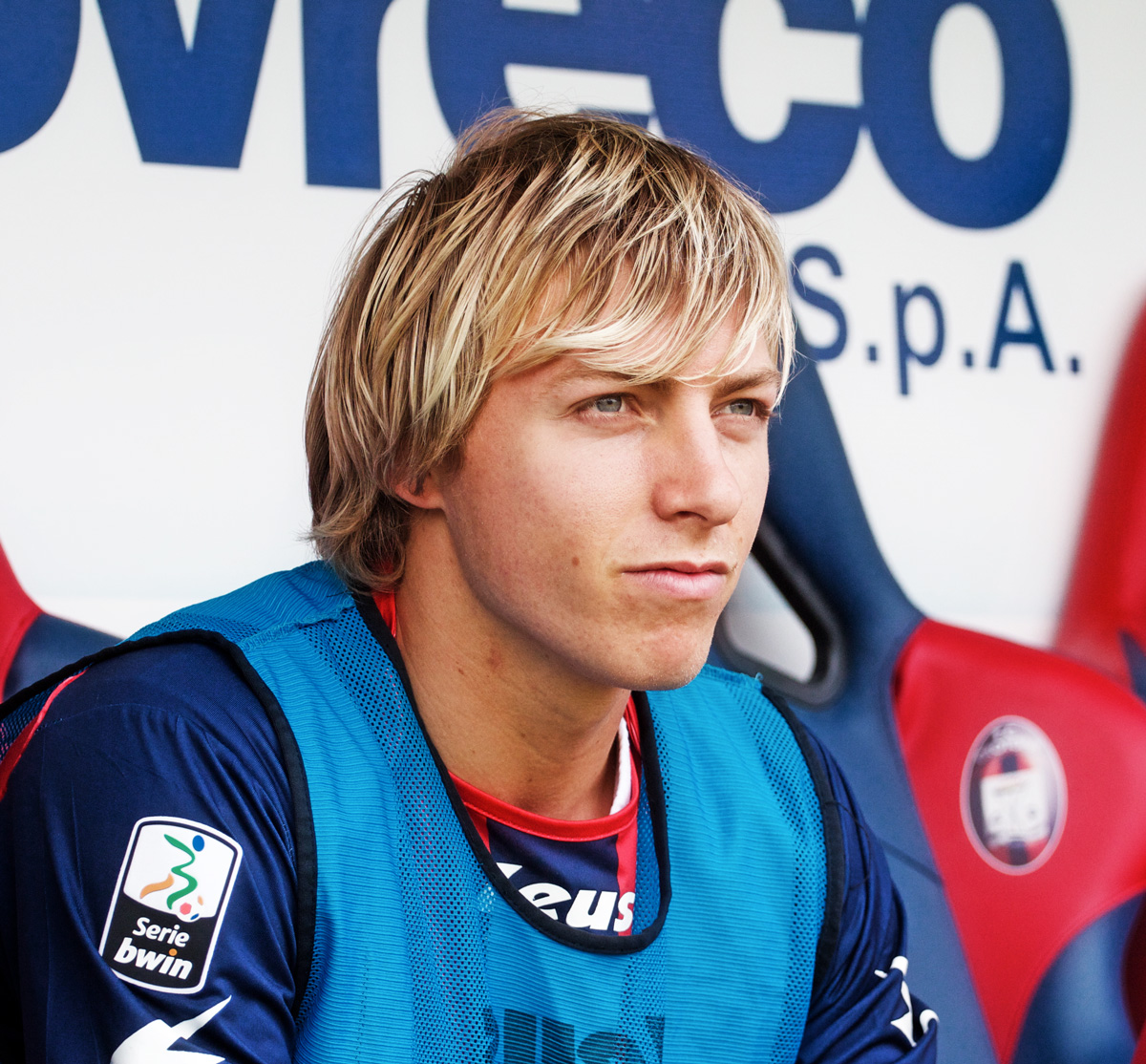
- Crescenzi in 2011

Personal information
- Full name: Alessandro Crescenzi
- Date of birth: 25 September 1991 (age 35)
- Place of birth: Marino, Italy
- Height: 1.81 m (5 ft 11 in)
- Position: Full-back

Team information
- Current team: Monterosi
- Number: 5

Youth career
- Roma

Senior career*
Years	Team	Apps	(Gls)
2008–2016	Roma	1	(0)
2009–2010	→ Grosseto (loan)	6	(0)
2010–2011	→ Crotone (loan)	33	(0)
2011–2012	→ Bari (loan)	30	(0)
2012	→ Pescara (loan)	1	(0)
2013	→ Novara (loan)	20	(1)
2013–2014	→ Ajaccio (loan)	9	(0)
2014	→ Novara (loan)	21	(0)
2014–2015	→ Perugia (loan)	40	(0)
2015–2016	→ Pescara (loan)	27	(0)
2016–2018	Pescara	50	(1)
2018–2020	Hellas Verona	13	(0)
2020	→ Cremonese (loan)	12	(0)
2020–2022	Cremonese	29	(0)
2022–2023	Pescara	22	(0)
2023–	Monterosi	15	(0)

International career
2009	Italy U18	4	(0)
2009–2010	Italy U19	10	(0)
2009–2011	Italy U20	8	(0)
2009–2012	Italy U21	20	(0)
- * Club domestic league appearances and goals as of 6 May 2024

Alessandro Crescenzi (born 25 September 1991) is an Italian professional footballer who plays as a full-back for Serie D club Monterosi.

== Club career ==
=== Roma ===
Crescenzi is a product of the Roma youth system. He is an attacking right back, with the ability to play also on the left side.

On 15 March 2009, he made his debut for the senior team at a young 17 years of age, in a Serie A match against Sampdoria.

In summer 2009, he was loaned out for one season to Serie B side Grosseto. In 2010, he was loaned to Serie B club Crotone, where he played as a starter on the right back position.

=== Bari ===
On 5 August 2011, Crescenzi joined Bari on a season-long loan deal that brought teammates Simone Sini and Adrian Stoian to the team as well. The loan also inserted a co-ownership option and Crescenzi also extended his contract to 2014 in order to formalize the deal. He would earn a gross annual salary of €177,000 in 2013–14 season. On 24 August his teammate Salvatore Masiello threw a plate that hit Crescenzi in the arm, necessitating 40 stitches and leading Bari to seek the termination of Masiello's contract.

=== Pescara ===
During the summer 2012 he joined on loan Serie A club Pescara.

=== Novara ===
On 25 January 2013, Crescenzi signed for Serie A club Novara on a loan spell.

=== Ajaccio ===
He returned to Roma for 2013–14 season, but was loaned to AC Ajaccio. After 9 games in Ligue 1 and two in French Cups, he was sent back to A.S. Roma in January 2014.

=== Cremonese ===
On 28 January 2020, he joined Serie B club Cremonese on loan with an option to purchase. On 24 August 2020, he moved to Cremonese on a permanent basis.

=== Return to Pescara ===
On 29 September 2022, Crescenzi returned to Pescara, now in Serie C.

== International career ==
On 25 March 2009, Crescenzi made his debut with the Italy U-21 squad in a friendly match against Austria.
