= Davide Vitturini =

Italian footballer (born 1997)

Personal information
- Date of birth: 21 February 1997 (age 29)
- Place of birth: L'Aquila, Italy
- Height: 1.80 m (5 ft 11 in)
- Position: Right back

Team information
- Current team: Luparense

Youth career
- Caldora
- Villa Raspa
- Pescara

Senior career*
Years	Team	Apps	(Gls)
2014–2020	Pescara	21	(0)
2015–2016	→ Teramo (loan)	0	(0)
2017	→ Carpi (loan)	2	(0)
2018	→ Carrarese (loan)	9	(0)
2018–2019	→ Fano (loan)	34	(1)
2020–2021	Feralpisalò	13	(0)
2021	Teramo	11	(0)
2022	Tsarsko Selo	12	(0)
2022–2025	Trento	70	(2)
2025–2026	Guidonia	12	(1)
2026–	Luparense	0	(0)

International career^{‡}
2012	Italy U16	1	(1)
2013–2014	Italy U17	6	(0)
2014–2015	Italy U18	4	(0)
2015–2016	Italy U19	14	(0)
2016	Italy U20	2	(0)
2013–2014	Italy U21	0	(0)
Medal record
Men's football
Representing Italy
UEFA European Under-19 Championship
Runner-up	2016 Germany
- * Club domestic league appearances and goals as of 30 April 2026 ‡ National team caps and goals as of 13 January 2017

Davide Vitturini (born 21 February 1997) is an Italian footballer who plays as a right-back for Serie D club Luparense.

== Club career ==
Born in L'Aquila, but raised in Florence and Pescara, Vitturini started playing football in two different grassroots teams before joining Pescara's youth academy, where he also played with Lucas Torreira. He made his debut with the first team on 2 December 2014, aged 17, in a Coppa Italia match against Sassuolo: his side lost 1–0 in the occasion. Just four days after, on 6 December 2014, he also made his league debut in the Serie B match against Pro Vercelli, which his side won 4–0. He gained another league appearance the following week, in the match against Avellino.

In the 2015 summer transfer window, Vitturini was sent on loan to Lega Pro team Teramo. However, Vitturini gained no playing time, and subsequently returned to Pescara in January 2016: he ended up being often used as a starter in the second part of the season in Serie B by Massimo Oddo, as the team reached promotion to Serie A following their victory in the play-offs.

Vitturini made his Serie A debut on 15 October 2016, in a 1–1 draw against Sampdoria. He collected other two consecutive appearances in the top flight, before picking up an injury that would force him to stop periodically and, eventually, lose the opportunity to take part in the FIFA Under-20 World Cup in 2017.

In the subsequent years, he would collect three consecutive loan spells with Carpi, Carrarese and Fano, although he could establish himself as a frequent starter only in the latter season.

On 15 January 2020, Vitturini signed a 1.5-year contract with Feralpisalò.

On 26 January 2021, Vitturini returned to Teramo, joining until the end of the season. He subsequently became a free agent at the end of June.

On 14 November 2022, Vitturini joined Trento in Serie C.

== International career ==
Vitturini has represented Italy at various youth levels. With the Italy U19 team, he took part at the 2016 UEFA European Under-19 Championship in Germany, where Italy finished as runners-up.

== Personal life ==
Vitturini studied at the Liceo Classico "Gabriele D'Annunzio" in Pescara, where he obtained his maturity diploma with a final score of 85/100.

He subsequently pursued and obtained (in November 2019) a degree in Business economics at the UniPegaso in Naples, where he has also pursued a professional degree in Sport management. He expressed the desire to work as a Director of Football following his retirement.

== Honours ==
Italy U19

- UEFA European Under-19 Championship runner-up: 2016
