= Emanuele Santaniello =

Italian footballer (born 1990)

Personal information
- Date of birth: 27 January 1990 (age 36)
- Place of birth: Naples, Italy
- Height: 1.85 m (6 ft 1 in)
- Position: Forward

Senior career*
Years	Team	Apps	(Gls)
2008–2010	Sapri	44	(20)
2010–2011	Cavese	6	(0)
2011	Città di Marino	7	(1)
2011–2012	Sarego	13	(3)
2012	Vigor Trani	12	(5)
2012–2013	Noto	14	(7)
2013–2014	Mariano Keller	25	(7)
2014–2015	Torres	14	(0)
2015	→ Paganese (loan)	2	(0)
2015–2016	Marcianise	16	(3)
2016–2017	Gragnano	31	(18)
2017–2018	Team Altamura	32	(15)
2018–2020	Picerno	52	(24)
2020–2021	Avellino	34	(3)
2021–2023	Turris	39	(11)
2023–2024	Monopoli	18	(3)
2024–2025	Foggia	25	(4)
2025–2026	Picerno	7	(1)
- * Club domestic league appearances and goals as of 24 January 2026

Emanuele Santaniello (born 27 January 1990) is an Italian professional footballer who plays as a forward.

== Club career ==
Born in Naples, Santaniello started his career in Serie D club Sapri. Made his debut in Serie C for Cavese on the 2010–11 season.

In September 2020, the forward signed for two years at Avellino.

On 18 August 2021, he joined Turris.

On 31 January 2023, Santaniello signed a 1.5-year deal with Monopoli.

On 15 January 2024, Santaniello moved to Foggia on a 1.5-year contract.
