= Pietro Perina =

Italian footballer

Personal information
- Date of birth: 28 February 1992 (age 34)
- Place of birth: Andria, Italy
- Height: 1.86 m (6 ft 1 in)
- Position: Goalkeeper

Team information
- Current team: Fidelis Andria
- Number: 92

Youth career
- Fortis Trani
- –2011: Bari

Senior career*
Years	Team	Apps	(Gls)
2011–2012	Bari	0	(0)
2012–2013	Martina Franca	18	(0)
2013–2015	Melfi	46	(0)
2015–2020	Cosenza	138	(0)
2018	→ Sambenedettese (loan)	19	(0)
2020–2021	Vicenza	10	(0)
2021–2023	Turris	60	(0)
2023–2024	Monopoli	20	(0)
2024–2025	Foggia	34	(0)
2025–2026	Sarnese	2	(0)
2026–	Fidelis Andria	9	(0)
- * Club domestic league appearances and goals as of 15 March 2026

Pietro Perina (born 28 February 1992) is an Italian football player who plays for Serie D club Fidelis Andria.

== Club career ==
He started his senior career with Bari and appeared on the bench as back-up once during the 2010–11 Serie A season.

He moved into the fourth tier with Martina Franca before the 2012–13 season. He made his Serie C debut for Melfi on 30 August 2014 in a game against Savoia.

On 10 July 2015, he signed a two-year contract with Cosenza, also in the Serie C. He spent the second part of the 2017–18 season on loan to Sambenedettese.

For the 2018–19 season, Cosenza advanced to the second-tier Serie B. Perina made his Serie B debut for Cosenza on 26 November 2018 in a game against Crotone. He kept a clean sheet in 5 out of the first 7 Serie B games of his career and finished the season with 11 clean sheets in 23 games played.

On 28 September 2020, he joined Vicenza.

On 26 July 2021, he signed with Serie C club Turris.

On 14 July 2023, Perina joined Monopoli on a two-year deal.

On 18 January 2024, Perina moved to Foggia on a 1.5-year contract.
