= 2019–20 Benevento Calcio season =

Benevento
2019–20 season
- Chairman: Oreste Vigorito
- Manager: Filippo Inzaghi
- Stadium: Stadio Ciro Vigorito
- Serie B: 1st (promoted)
- Coppa Italia: Second round
- Top goalscorer: League: Marco Sau (12); All: Marco Sau (12)
Home colours	Away colours	Third colours

The 2019–20 season was the second consecutive season of Benevento in the second division of Italian football after relegation from Serie A in 2018.

Along with competing in the league, the club also participated in the Coppa Italia.

On 29 June 2020, Benevento secured promotion to the Serie A with seven matches to spare. At the time, Benevento had won 23 of their 31 league games and lost just once, and had a 24-point advantage over nearest rivals Crotone and Cittadella. Ascoli were the last club to be promoted with seven games remaining, and they did so in 1977–78 when only two points were awarded for a victory.

== Players ==
=== Squad information ===
As of 30 January 2020

Note: Flags indicate national team as defined under FIFA eligibility rules; some limited exceptions apply. Players may hold more than one non-FIFA nationality.

No.	Pos.	Nation	Player
1	GK	(Italy) ITA	Lorenzo Montipò
2	DF	(Italy) ITA	Francesco Rillo
3	DF	(Italy) ITA	Gaetano Letizia
4	MF	(Italy) ITA	Lorenzo Del Pinto
5	DF	(Italy) ITA	Luca Caldirola
6	MF	(Ivory Coast) CIV	Siriki Sanogo
7	MF	(Germany) GER	Oliver Kragl
8	MF	(Colombia) COL	Andrés Tello
9	FW	(Italy) ITA	Massimo Coda
10	MF	(Italy) ITA	Nicolas Viola (Vice-captain)
11	DF	(Italy) ITA	Christian Maggio (Captain)
12	GK	(Italy) ITA	Niccolò Manfredini
13	DF	(Italy) ITA	Alessandro Tuia
14	DF	(Italy) ITA	Massimo Volta

No.	Pos.	Nation	Player
16	MF	(Italy) ITA	Riccardo Improta
17	MF	(Ghana) GHA	Abdallah Basit
18	DF	(Ghana) GHA	Bright Gyamfi
19	MF	(Italy) ITA	Roberto Insigne
20	FW	(Italy) ITA	Giuseppe Di Serio
21	MF	(Finland) FIN	Përparim Hetemaj
22	GK	(Italy) ITA	Pier Graziano Gori
23	DF	(Italy) ITA	Luca Antei
25	FW	(Italy) ITA	Marco Sau
27	MF	(Slovenia) SVN	Dejan Vokić
28	MF	(Italy) ITA	Pasquale Schiattarella
32	FW	(Italy) ITA	Gabriele Moncini
35	DF	(Italy) ITA	Federico Barba (on loan from Chievo)

=== Out on loan ===
Note: Flags indicate national team as defined under FIFA eligibility rules; some limited exceptions apply. Players may hold more than one non-FIFA nationality.

No.	Pos.	Nation	Player
—	DF	(Italy) ITA	Gianluca Di Chiara (at Perugia)
—	DF	(Italy) ITA	Luca Sparandeo (at Virtus Francavilla)
—	DF	(Italy) ITA	Salvatore Tazza (at Arzignano)
—	MF	(Italy) ITA	Alessio Donnarumma (at Picerno)
—	MF	(Japan) JPN	Cy Goddard (at Pafos)

No.	Pos.	Nation	Player
—	MF	(Brazil) BRA	Guilherme (at Yeni Malatyaspor)
—	MF	(Italy) ITA	Giovanni Volpicelli (at Arezzo)
—	FW	(Sweden) SWE	Samuel Armenteros (at Crotone)
—	FW	(Italy) ITA	Pietro Iemmello (at Perugia)

== Competitions ==
=== Serie B ===
==== League table ====
Pos	Team	Pld	W	D	L	GF	GA	GD	Pts	Promotion, qualification or relegation
1	Benevento (C, P)	38	26	8	4	67	27	+40	86	Promotion to Serie A
2	Crotone (P)	38	20	8	10	63	40	+23	68	Promotion to Serie A
3	Spezia (O, P)	38	17	10	11	54	40	+14	61	Qualification for promotion play-offs semi-finals
4	Pordenone	38	16	10	12	48	46	+2	58 (Note: Pordenone finished ahead of Cittadella on head-to-head points: Pordenone 0–0 Cittadella, Cittadella 0–2 Pordenone.)	Qualification for promotion play-offs semi-finals
5	Cittadella	38	17	7	14	49	49	0	58	Qualification for promotion play-offs preliminary round

Source: Lega Serie B (in Italian) SOCCERWAY (in English)
Rules for classification: 1) Points; 2) Head-to-head points; 3) Head-to-head goal difference; 4) Goal difference; 5) Goals scored; 6) Draw.
(C) Champions; (O) Play-off winners; (P) Promoted

==== Results summary ====
Overall								Home						Away					
Pld	W	D	L	GF	GA	GD	Pts	W	D	L	GF	GA	GD	W	D	L	GF	GA	GD
35	24	8	3	60	22	+38	80	14	4	0	39	8	+31	10	4	3	21	14	+7

Last updated: 19 July 2020.
Source: Soccerway

==== Positions by round ====
The table lists the positions of Benevento after each week of matches. In order to preserve chronological evolvements, any postponed matches are not included to the round at which they were originally scheduled, but added to the full round they were played immediately afterwards.

Team ╲ Round	1	2	3	4	5	6	7	8	9	10	11	12	13	14	15	16	17	18	19	20	21	22	23	24	25	26	27	28	29	30	31	32	33	34	35	36	37	38
Benevento	9	4	2	1	2	4	1	1	2	1	1	1	1	1	1	1	1	1	1	1	1	1	1	1	1	1	1	1	1	1	1	1	1	1	1	1	1	1

Champions, promotion to Serie A
Promotion to Serie A
Play-off semifinals
Play-off preliminary round
Play-out
Relegation to Serie C

Source: Serie BKT

==== August ====
23 August 2019 Match 1	Pisa	0 - 0	Benevento	Pisa
21:00	Lisi (yellow card) 36'; Benedetti (yellow card) 43'; De Vitis (yellow card) 58'; Belli (yellow card) 61'	Summary	Volta (yellow card) 45'	Stadium: Arena Garibaldi – Stadio Romeo Anconetani; Attendance: 8,521; Referee: (Italy) Francesco Fourneau

31 August 2019 Match 2	Benevento	4 - 1	Cittadella	Benevento
18:00	Ghiringhelli 28' (o.g.); Maggio 51'; Insigne 58'; Volta (yellow card) 69'; Coda 83'	Summary	Diaw (yellow card) 37' (goal) 80'	Stadium: Stadio Ciro Vigorito; Referee: (Italy) Gianluca Aureliano

=== Coppa Italia ===
==== Second round ====
11 August 2019	Benevento (2)	3–4	Monza (3)	Benevento
CEST (UTC+02:00)	Tello 51', 83'; Viola 90+4' (pen.)		Bellusci 4'; Finotto 17', 88'; Iocolano 49'	Stadium: Stadio Ciro Vigorito

== Statistics ==
=== Hat-tricks ===
As of 3 July 2020.

Player	Against	Result	Date
(Italy) Nicolas Viola	Trapani	5–0 (H)	6 December 2019
(Italy) Marco Sau	Ascoli	4–0 (H)	29 December 2019

Note

(H) – Home (A) – Away

=== Clean sheets ===
As of 3 July 2020.

Player	Clean sheets	Weeks
(Italy) Lorenzo Montipò	18	1, 3, 7, 8, 10, 11, 13, 14, 15, 16, 17, 19, 23, 25, 28, 29, 30, 31

== See also ==
- History of Benevento Calcio
