= 2017–18 Benevento Calcio season =

Benevento
2017–18 season
- President: Oreste Vigorito
- Manager: Marco Baroni (until 23 October 2017); Roberto De Zerbi (from 23 October 2017)
- Stadium: Stadio Ciro Vigorito
- Serie A: 20th (relegated)
- Coppa Italia: Third round
- Top goalscorer: League: Cheick Diabaté (8); All: Cheick Diabaté (8)
- Highest home attendance: 16,867 vs Juventus (7 April 2018, Serie A)
- Lowest home attendance: 5,869 vs Perugia (12 August 2017, Coppa Italia)
- Average home league attendance: 12,132
| Home colours | Away colours | Third colours |

The 2017–18 season was Benevento Calcio's first-ever season in Serie A, the top-flight of Italian football. The club competed in both Serie A and the Coppa Italia.

Following fourteen consecutive defeats to begin the season (an Italian top-flight record), Benevento remained rooted firmly in 20th place during the entirety of the 2017–18 campaign. The club were also eliminated early on in the third round of the Coppa Italia, falling 4–0 to Serie B side Perugia, with Juventus loanee and Italian youth player Alberto Cerri scoring a hat-trick.

Malian footballer and former Bordeaux player Cheick Diabaté, a winter signing, finished as the club's top scorer with eight goals, following an excellent end of season, though this would not be enough to save the club from returning immediately to the second division.

== Players ==
=== Squad information ===
As of 9 February 2018

Note: Flags indicate national team as defined under FIFA eligibility rules; some limited exceptions apply. Players may hold more than one non-FIFA nationality.

| No. | Pos. | Nation | Player |
|---|---|---|---|
| 3 | DF | ITA | Gaetano Letizia |
| 4 | MF | ITA | Lorenzo Del Pinto |
| 5 | DF | ITA | Fabio Lucioni (captain) |
| 6 | DF | ALB | Berat Djimsiti (on loan from Atalanta) |
| 7 | MF | ITA | Marco D'Alessandro (on loan from Atalanta) |
| 8 | MF | ITA | Danilo Cataldi (on loan from Lazio) |
| 11 | FW | ITA | Massimo Coda |
| 12 | GK | ITA | Riccardo Piscitelli |
| 14 | MF | ITA | Nicolas Viola |
| 16 | DF | ROU | Alin Toșca (on loan from Real Betis) |
| 18 | DF | GHA | Bright Gyamfi |
| 20 | MF | ALB | Ledian Memushaj (on loan from Pescara) |
| 21 | DF | ITA | Andrea Costa |
| 22 | GK | ITA | Alberto Brignoli (on loan from Juventus) |
| 23 | DF | ITA | Lorenzo Venuti (on loan from Fiorentina) |

| No. | Pos. | Nation | Player |
|---|---|---|---|
| 25 | FW | MLI | Cheick Diabaté (on loan from Osmanlıspor) |
| 26 | FW | ITA | Vittorio Parigini (on loan from Torino) |
| 29 | DF | FRA | Jean-Claude Billong |
| 30 | MF | BRA | Sandro (on loan from Antalyaspor) |
| 31 | MF | SRB | Filip Đuričić (on loan from Sampdoria) |
| 33 | FW | ITA | Pietro Iemmello (on loan from Sassuolo) |
| 66 | MF | BRA | Guilherme |
| 73 | MF | ITA | Giovanni Volpicelli |
| 77 | MF | MAR | Achraf Lazaar (on loan from Newcastle) |
| 81 | GK | ITA | Christian Puggioni |
| 83 | DF | FRA | Bacary Sagna |
| 87 | FW | ITA | Cristiano Lombardi (on loan from Lazio) |
| 88 | DF | ITA | Luca Antei (on loan from Sassuolo) |
| 99 | FW | ITA | Enrico Brignola |

== Transfers ==
=== In ===
| Date | Pos. | Player | Age | Moving from | Fee | Notes | Source |
|---|---|---|---|---|---|---|---|
| 1 July 2017 | FW | (Italy) Massimo Coda | 28 | (Italy) Salernitana | Undisclosed | | |
| 7 July 2017 | GK | (Slovenia) Vid Belec | 27 | (Italy) Carpi | Undisclosed | | |
| 7 July 2017 | DF | (Italy) Gaetano Letizia | 27 | (Italy) Carpi | Undisclosed | | |
| 15 July 2017 | DF | (Italy) Gianluca Di Chiara | 23 | (Italy) Perugia | Undisclosed | | |
| 30 August 2017 | FW | (Sweden) Samuel Armenteros | 27 | (Netherlands) Heracles Almelo | €2M | | |

==== Loans in ====
| Date | Pos. | Player | Age | Moving from | Fee | Notes | Source |
|---|---|---|---|---|---|---|---|
| 7 July 2017 | FW | (Romania) George Pușcaș | 21 | (Italy) Internazionale | Loan | Loan with an option to buy | |
| 19 July 2017 | MF | (Italy) Danilo Cataldi | 22 | (Italy) Lazio | Loan | On loan until the end of the season | |
| 7 August 2017 | GK | (Italy) Alberto Brignoli | 25 | (Italy) Juventus | Loan | | |
| 31 August 2017 | FW | (Italy) Vittorio Parigini | 21 | (Italy) Torino | Loan | | |
| 31 August 2017 | DF | (Italy) Luca Antei | 25 | (Italy) Sassuolo | Loan | Loan with an option to buy | |
| 31 August 2017 | FW | (Italy) Pietro Iemmello | 25 | (Italy) Sassuolo | Loan | Loan with an option to buy | |
| 31 August 2017 | DF | (Morocco) Achraf Lazaar | 25 | (England) Newcastle United | Loan | Loan with an option to buy for €3.5M | |
| 31 August 2017 | FW | (Italy) Cristiano Lombardi | 22 | (Italy) Lazio | Loan | | |
| 13 January 2018 | FW | (Mali) Cheick Diabaté | 29 | (Turkey) Osmanlıspor | Loan | | |
| 18 January 2018 | MF | (Serbia) Filip Đuričić | 25 | (Italy) Sampdoria | Loan | | |
| 3 February 2018 | DF | (France) Bacary Sagna | 35 | (England) Manchester City | Loan | Option to extend loan for another year | |

=== Out ===
| Date | Pos. | Player | Age | Moving to | Fee | Notes | Source |

==== Loans out ====
| Date | Pos. | Player | Age | Moving to | Fee | Notes | Source |
|---|---|---|---|---|---|---|---|
| 18 January 2018 | MF | (Italy) Amato Ciciretti | 24 | (Italy) Parma | Loan | | |

== Competitions ==
=== Serie A ===
==== League table ====
| Pos | Team | Pld | W | D | L | GF | GA | GD | Pts | Qualification or relegation |
|---|---|---|---|---|---|---|---|---|---|---|
| 16 | Cagliari | 38 | 11 | 6 | 21 | 33 | 61 | −28 | 39 | |
| 17 | SPAL | 38 | 8 | 14 | 16 | 39 | 59 | −20 | 38 | |
| 18 | Crotone (R) | 38 | 9 | 8 | 21 | 40 | 66 | −26 | 35 | Relegation to Serie B |
| 19 | Hellas Verona (R) | 38 | 7 | 4 | 27 | 30 | 78 | −48 | 25 | Relegation to Serie B |
| 20 | Benevento (R) | 38 | 6 | 3 | 29 | 33 | 84 | −51 | 21 | Relegation to Serie B |

Source: Serie A, Soccerway
Rules for classification: 1) Points; 2) Head-to-head points; 3) Head-to-head goal difference; 4) Goal difference; 5) Goals scored; 6) Draw.
(R) Relegated

==== Results summary ====
| Overall | | | | | | | | Home | | | | | | Away | | | | | |
| Pld | W | D | L | GF | GA | GD | Pts | W | D | L | GF | GA | GD | W | D | L | GF | GA | GD |
|---|---|---|---|---|---|---|---|---|---|---|---|---|---|---|---|---|---|---|---|
| 38 | 6 | 3 | 29 | 33 | 84 | −51 | 21 | 5 | 2 | 12 | 23 | 40 | −17 | 1 | 1 | 17 | 10 | 44 | −34 |

Last updated: 20 May 2018.
Source: Competitive matches

==== Results by round ====
| Round | 1 | 2 | 3 | 4 | 5 | 6 | 7 | 8 | 9 | 10 | 11 | 12 | 13 | 14 | 15 | 16 | 17 | 18 | 19 | 20 | 21 | 22 | 23 | 24 | 25 | 26 | 27 | 28 | 29 | 30 | 31 | 32 | 33 | 34 | 35 | 36 | 37 | 38 |
|---|---|---|---|---|---|---|---|---|---|---|---|---|---|---|---|---|---|---|---|---|---|---|---|---|---|---|---|---|---|---|---|---|---|---|---|---|---|---|
| Ground | A | H | H | A | H | A | H | A | H | A | H | A | H | A | H | A | H | A | H | H | A | A | H | A | H | A | H | A | H | A | H | A | H | A | H | A | H | A |
| Result | L | L | L | L | L | L | L | L | L | L | L | L | L | L | D | L | L | L | W | W | L | L | L | L | W | L | W | L | L | L | L | D | L | W | D | L | W | L |
| Position | 14 | 17 | 20 | 20 | 20 | 20 | 20 | 20 | 20 | 20 | 20 | 20 | 20 | 20 | 20 | 20 | 20 | 20 | 20 | 20 | 20 | 20 | 20 | 20 | 20 | 20 | 20 | 20 | 20 | 20 | 20 | 20 | 20 | 20 | 20 | 20 | 20 | 20 |

Updated to match(es) played on 20 May 2018. Source: Competitive matches
A = Away; H = Home; W = Win; D = Draw; L = Loss

==== Matches ====
| 20 August 2017 1 | Sampdoria | 2–1 | Benevento | Genoa |
| 20:45 CEST (UTC+02:00) | Quagliarella 38', 54'; Barreto (yellow card) 45' | Report | Ciciretti 15'; Del Pinto (yellow card) 49'; Cataldi (yellow card) 90+5' | Stadium: Stadio Luigi Ferraris; Attendance: 19,223; Referee: Fabrizio Pasqua |

| 27 August 2017 2 | Benevento | 0–1 | Bologna | Benevento |
| 20:45 CEST (UTC+02:00) | Del Pinto (yellow card) 77' | Report | Poli (yellow card) 39'; Donsah 55'; Mirante (yellow card) 76'; De Maio (yellow card) 90+6' | Stadium: Stadio Ciro Vigorito; Attendance: 11,054; Referee: Gianpaolo Calvarese |

| 10 September 2017 3 | Benevento | 0–1 | Torino | Benevento |
| 18:00 CEST (UTC+02:00) | Cataldi (yellow card) 45+1'; Memushaj (yellow card) 68' | Report | Moretti (yellow card) 32'; Rincón (yellow card) 53'; Falque 90+3' | Stadium: Stadio Ciro Vigorito; Attendance: 11,416; Referee: Rosario Abisso |

| 17 September 2017 4 | Napoli | 6–0 | Benevento | Naples |
| 15:00 CEST (UTC+02:00) | Allan 3'; Insigne 15'; Mertens 27', 65' (pen.), 90' (pen.); Callejón 32' | Report | Letizia (yellow card) 37' | Stadium: Stadio San Paolo; Attendance: 49,137; Referee: Massimiliano Irrati |

| 20 September 2017 5 | Benevento | 0–4 | Roma | Benevento |
| 18:30 CEST (UTC+02:00) | Di Chiara (yellow card) 56'; Parigini (yellow card) 84' | Report | Džeko 22', 52'; Lucioni 35' (o.g.); Venuti 74' (o.g.) | Stadium: Stadio Ciro Vigorito; Attendance: 14,839; Referee: Michael Fabbri |

| 24 September 2017 6 | Crotone | 2–0 | Benevento | Crotone |
| 15:00 CEST (UTC+02:00) | Mandragora 43'; Rohdén 58' | Report | | Stadium: Stadio Ezio Scida; Attendance: 8,827; Referee: Daniele Orsato |

| 1 October 2017 7 | Benevento | 1–2 | Internazionale | Benevento |
| 15:00 CEST (UTC+02:00) | D'Alessandro 42'; Costa (yellow card) 43'; Lombardi (yellow card) 64' | Report | Brozović 19', 22'; Valero (yellow card) 31'; Miranda (yellow card) 68'; Vecino (yellow card) 74' | Stadium: Stadio Ciro Vigorito; Attendance: 16,274; Referee: Daniele Doveri |

| 16 October 2017 8 | Hellas Verona | 1–0 | Benevento | Verona |
| 20:45 CEST (UTC+02:00) | Bessa (yellow card) 27'; Fossati (yellow card) 43'; Rômulo 74', (yellow card) 86'; Kean (yellow card) 77' | Report | Venuti (yellow card) 32'; Antei (red card) 37'; Chibsah (yellow card) 58'; Brignoli (yellow card) 73' | Stadium: Stadio Marc'Antonio Bentegodi; Attendance: 16,282; Referee: Marco Di Bello |

| 22 October 2017 9 | Benevento | 0–3 | Fiorentina | Benevento |
| 15:00 CEST (UTC+02:00) | Chibsah (yellow card) 40'; Cataldi (yellow card) 66' | Report | Benassi 18'; Pezzella (yellow card) 45'; Babacar 47'; Théréau 66' (pen.) | Stadium: Stadio Ciro Vigorito; Attendance: 10,887; Referee: Claudio Gavillucci |

| 25 October 2017 10 | Cagliari | 2–1 | Benevento | Cagliari |
| 20:45 CEST (UTC+02:00) | Faragò 9', (yellow card) 28'; Cigarini (yellow card) 55'; Padoin (yellow card) 76'; Barella (yellow card) 83'; Pavoletti (yellow card) 88', (goal) 90+5' | Report | Di Chiara (yellow card) 15'; Iemmello 90+4' (pen.) | Stadium: Sardegna Arena; Attendance: 13,630; Referee: Massimiliano Irrati |

| 29 October 2017 11 | Benevento | 1–5 | Lazio | Benevento |
| 12:30 CET (UTC+01:00) | Viola (yellow card) 42'; Lazaar 55' | Report | Bastos 4'; Immobile 13'; Marušić 24'; Parolo 76'; Lukaku (yellow card) 85'; Nani 86' | Stadium: Stadio Ciro Vigorito; Attendance: 12,413; Referee: Piero Giacomelli |

| 5 November 2017 12 | Juventus | 2–1 | Benevento | Turin |
| 15:00 CET (UTC+01:00) | Marchisio (yellow card) 41'; Higuaín 57', (yellow card) 73'; Cuadrado 65'; Bernardeschi (yellow card) 89' | Report | Ciciretti 19'; Cataldi (yellow card) 37'; Chibsah (yellow card) 45+2'; Antei (yellow card) 85' | Stadium: Allianz Stadium; Attendance: 39,125; Referee: Rosario Abisso |

| 19 November 2017 13 | Benevento | 1–2 | Sassuolo | Benevento |
| 15:00 CET (UTC+01:00) | Letizia (yellow card) 25' (yellow-red card) 67'; Costa (yellow card) 43'; Armenteros 65', (yellow card) 66' | Report | Magnanelli (yellow card) 30'; Matri 57'; Peluso 90+4' | Stadium: Stadio Ciro Vigorito; Attendance: 10,312; Referee: Paolo Mazzoleni |

| 27 November 2017 14 | Atalanta | 1–0 | Benevento | Bergamo |
| 20:45 CET (UTC+01:00) | De Roon (yellow card) 51'; Cristante 75' | Report | Costa (yellow card) 14'; Venuti (yellow card) 42' | Stadium: Stadio Atleti Azzurri d'Italia; Attendance: 16,687; Referee: Fabrizio Pasqua |

| 3 December 2017 15 | Benevento | 2–2 | Milan | Benevento |
| 12:30 CET (UTC+01:00) | Cataldi (yellow card) 29'; Pușcaș 50'; Di Chiara (yellow card) 54'; Brignoli 90+5'; D'Alessandro (yellow card) 90+6' | Report | Romagnoli (yellow card) 24' (yellow-red card) 75'; Bonaventura 38'; Kalinić 57'; Rodríguez (yellow card) 71'; Kessié (yellow card) 89'; Abate (yellow card) 90+4' | Stadium: Stadio Ciro Vigorito; Attendance: 15,710; Referee: Maurizio Mariani |

| 10 December 2017 16 | Udinese | 2–0 | Benevento | Udine |
| 15:00 CET (UTC+01:00) | Barák 5'; Lasagna 41'; Jankto (yellow card) 67' | Report | Costa (yellow card) 49'; Gyamfi (yellow card) 83' | Stadium: Dacia Arena; Attendance: 13,948; Referee: Gianluca Aureliano |

| 17 December 2017 17 | Benevento | 1–2 | SPAL | Benevento |
| 18:00 CET (UTC+01:00) | Chibsah (yellow card) 37'; Letizia (yellow card) 51'; Cremonesi 59' (o.g.) | Report | Schiattarella (yellow card) 46'; Mattiello (yellow card) 58'; Floccari 64', 73'; Cremonesi (yellow card) 86' | Stadium: Stadio Ciro Vigorito; Attendance: 10,312; Referee: Fabrizio Pasqua |

| 23 December 2017 18 | Genoa | 1–0 | Benevento | Genoa |
| 15:00 CET (UTC+01:00) | Zukanović (yellow card) 45'; Lapadula (yellow card) 62', (goal) 90+2' (pen.) | Report | Lucioni (yellow card) 28'; Del Pinto (yellow card) 44'; Cataldi (yellow card) 83'; Belec (yellow card) 90'; Lombardi (yellow card) 90+3' | Stadium: Stadio Luigi Ferraris; Attendance: 19,465; Referee: Rosario Abisso |

| 30 December 2017 19 | Benevento | 1–0 | Chievo | Benevento |
| 15:00 CET (UTC+01:00) | Coda 64'; Memushaj (yellow card) 90+2' | Report | Radovanović (yellow card) 30'; Pucciarelli (yellow card) 90+5' | Stadium: Stadio Ciro Vigorito; Attendance: 10,200; Referee: Francesco Fourneau |

| 6 January 2018 20 | Benevento | 3–2 | Sampdoria | Benevento |
| 15:00 CET (UTC+01:00) | Brignola (yellow card) 32', (goal) 90+1'; Coda 69', 84' | Report | Caprari 45+1'; Barreto (yellow card) 60'; Sala (red card) 83'; Kownacki 90+4' | Stadium: Stadio Ciro Vigorito; Attendance: 11,363; Referee: Gianluca Manganiello |

| 21 January 2018 21 | Bologna | 3–0 | Benevento | Bologna |
| 15:00 CET (UTC+01:00) | Poli (yellow card) 26'; Destro 35'; Džemaili (yellow card) 44', (goal) 88'; Mbaye (yellow card) 69'; De Maio 73'; Di Francesco (yellow card) 90+2' | Report | Venuti (yellow card) 34'; Memushaj (yellow card) 57' | Stadium: Stadio Renato Dall'Ara; Attendance: 20,515; Referee: Eugenio Abbattista |

| 28 January 2018 22 | Torino | 3–0 | Benevento | Turin |
| 15:00 CET (UTC+01:00) | Falque 3'; Niang (yellow card) 33', (goal) 40'; Obi 45'; Molinaro (yellow card) 60' | Report | Djimsiti (yellow card) 22'; Belec (red card) 33' | Stadium: Stadio Olimpico Grande Torino; Attendance: 16,257; Referee: Maurizio Mariani |

| 4 February 2018 23 | Benevento | 0–2 | Napoli | Benevento |
| 20:45 CET (UTC+01:00) | Djimsiti (yellow card) 73' | Report | Mertens 20'; Hamšík 47' | Stadium: Stadio Ciro Vigorito; Attendance: 15,026; Referee: Marco Di Bello |

| 11 February 2018 24 | Roma | 5–2 | Benevento | Rome |
| 20:45 CET (UTC+01:00) | Fazio 26'; Džeko 59'; Ünder 62', 75'; Defrel 90+2' (pen.) | Report | Guilherme 7'; Brignola 76' | Stadium: Stadio Olimpico; Attendance: 31,956; Referee: Gianluca Manganiello |

| 18 February 2018 25 | Benevento | 3–2 | Crotone | Benevento |
| 15:00 CET (UTC+01:00) | Coda (yellow card) 25'; Letizia (yellow card) 32'; Sandro 37', (yellow card) 80'; Brignola (yellow card) 58'; Viola 65'; Đuričić (yellow card) 67'; Diabaté 89' | Report | Crociata 11'; Budimir (yellow card) 66'; Benali 73', (yellow card) 75' | Stadium: Stadio Ciro Vigorito; Attendance: 10,163; Referee: Gianluca Rocchi |

| 24 February 2018 26 | Internazionale | 2–0 | Benevento | Milan |
| 20:45 CET (UTC+01:00) | Candreva (yellow card) 56'; Ranocchia (yellow card) 59', (goal) 69'; Škriniar 66' | Report | Viola (yellow card) 68' (yellow-red card) 81'; Del Pinto (yellow card) 90' | Stadium: San Siro; Attendance: 47,157; Referee: Luca Pairetto |

| 11 March 2018 28 | Fiorentina | 1–0 | Benevento | Florence |
| 12:30 CET (UTC+01:00) | Vitor Hugo 25'; Badelj (yellow card) 54'; Pezzella (yellow card) 62' | Report | Guilherme (yellow card) 49'; Lombardi (yellow card) 72'; Del Pinto (yellow card) 79' | Stadium: Stadio Artemio Franchi; Attendance: 34,381; Referee: Fabrizio Pasqua |

| 18 March 2018 29 | Benevento | 1–2 | Cagliari | Benevento |
| 18:00 CET (UTC+01:00) | Brignola 46', (yellow card) 50'; Cataldi (yellow card) 66' | Report | Castán (yellow card) 29'; Faragò (yellow card) 38'; Pavoletti 90+1'; Barella 90+7' (pen.) | Stadium: Stadio Ciro Vigorito; Attendance: 9,443; Referee: Gianluca Manganiello |

| 31 March 2018 30 | Lazio | 6–2 | Benevento | Rome |
| 15:00 CEST (UTC+02:00) | Immobile 19', 68'; Caicedo 60'; De Vrij 66'; Lucas 83'; Luis Alberto 90+1' (pen.) | Report | Puggioni (red card) 9'; Cataldi 23'; Guilherme 51'; Letizia (yellow card) 54'; Brignoli (yellow card) 63'; Sandro (yellow card) 82'; Costa (yellow card) 90+2' | Stadium: Stadio Olimpico; Attendance: 30,000; Referee: Gianpaolo Calvarese |

| 4 April 2018 27 | Benevento | 3–0 | Hellas Verona | Benevento |
| 17:00 CEST (UTC+02:00) | Letizia 25', (yellow card) 52'; Del Pinto (yellow card) 45+1'; Diabaté 66', 84' | Report | Büchel (yellow card) 52'; Felicioli (yellow card) 68' | Stadium: Stadio Ciro Vigorito; Attendance: 11,006; Referee: Paolo Valeri |
Note: Postponed due to Fiorentina player Davide Astori's death; originally scheduled for 4 March 2018.

| 7 April 2018 31 | Benevento | 2–4 | Juventus | Benevento |
| 15:00 CEST (UTC+02:00) | Diabaté 24', 51' | Report | Dybala 16', 45+3' (pen.), 74' (pen.); Mandžukić (yellow card) 37'; Douglas Costa 82' | Stadium: Stadio Ciro Vigorito; Attendance: 16,867; Referee: Fabrizio Pasqua |

| 15 April 2018 32 | Sassuolo | 2–2 | Benevento | Reggio Emilia |
| 15:00 CEST (UTC+02:00) | Peluso (yellow card) 3'; Acerbi (yellow card) 23'; Politano 41', 64'; Magnanelli (yellow card) 45+6' | Report | Diabaté 22', 72'; Cataldi (yellow card) 46'; Sandro (yellow card) 71' | Stadium: Mapei Stadium – Città del Tricolore; Attendance: 8,880; Referee: Claudio Gavillucci |

| 18 April 2018 33 | Benevento | 0–3 | Atalanta | Benevento |
| 18:00 CEST (UTC+02:00) | Toșca (yellow card) 64'; Brignola (yellow card) 71' | Report | Freuler 21'; Petagna (yellow card) 31'; Mancini (yellow card) 39'; Barrow 49'; Gómez 67' | Stadium: Stadio Ciro Vigorito; Attendance: 10,013; Referee: Davide Ghersini |

| 21 April 2018 34 | Milan | 0–1 | Benevento | Milan |
| 20:45 CEST (UTC+02:00) | Locatelli (yellow card) 82'; Kessié (yellow card) 90+4' | Report | Iemmello 29'; Sagna (yellow card) 59'; Diabaté (yellow card) 75' (yellow-red card) 80'; Parigini (yellow card) 90+4' | Stadium: San Siro; Attendance: 47,655; Referee: Maurizio Mariani |

| 29 April 2018 35 | Benevento | 3–3 | Udinese | Benevento |
| 15:00 CEST (UTC+02:00) | Venuti (yellow card) 12'; Viola 23'; Cataldi (yellow card) 27' (yellow-red card) 57'; Brignola (yellow card) 66'; Coda 76' (pen.); Sagna 90' | Report | Widmer 13'; Behrami (yellow card) 48'; Balić (yellow card) 64'; Pezzella (yellow card) 75'; Lasagna 78', 79' | Stadium: Stadio Ciro Vigorito; Attendance: 10,363; Referee: Fabio Maresca |

| 6 May 2018 36 | SPAL | 2–0 | Benevento | Ferrara |
| 15:00 CEST (UTC+02:00) | Vicari (yellow card) 12'; Paloschi 25'; Mattiello (yellow card) 73'; Antenucci 82' (pen.) | Report | Sandro (yellow card) 53'; Sparandeo (yellow card) 81' | Stadium: Stadio Paolo Mazza; Attendance: 11,900; Referee: Marco Guida |

| 12 May 2018 37 | Benevento | 1–0 | Genoa | Benevento |
| 18:00 CEST (UTC+02:00) | Cataldi (yellow card) 40'; Diabaté 87' | Report | Bertolacci (yellow card) 44' | Stadium: Stadio Ciro Vigorito; Attendance: 13,616; Referee: Daniele Chiffi |

| 20 May 2018 38 | Chievo | 1–0 | Benevento | Verona |
| 18:00 CEST (UTC+02:00) | Inglese 49'; Radovanović (yellow card) 87' | Report | | Stadium: Stadio Marc'Antonio Bentegodi; Attendance: 18,000; Referee: Fabrizio Pasqua |

=== Coppa Italia ===
| 12 August 2017 Third round | Benevento | 0–4 | Perugia | Benevento |
| 20:30 CEST (UTC+02:00) | Belec (yellow card) 74' | Report | Volta (yellow card) 28'; Cerri 43', 70', 73' (pen.); Zanon (yellow card) 61'; Emmanuello 88' | Stadium: Stadio Ciro Vigorito; Attendance: 5,869; Referee: Luigi Nasca |

== Statistics ==
=== Appearances and goals ===
| No. | Pos | Nat | Player | Total | | Serie A | | Coppa Italia | |
| No. | Pos | Nat | Player | Apps | Goals | Apps | Goals | Apps | Goals |
Goalkeepers
| 12 | GK | (Italy) ITA | Riccardo Piscitelli | 0 | 0 | 0 | 0 | 0 | 0 |
| 22 | GK | (Italy) ITA | Alberto Brignoli | 13 | 1 | 11+2 | 1 | 0 | 0 |
| 81 | GK | (Italy) ITA | Christian Puggioni | 14 | 0 | 14 | 0 | 0 | 0 |
Defenders
| 2 | DF | (Spain) ESP | Christian Rutjens Oliva | 1 | 0 | 0+1 | 0 | 0 | 0 |
| 3 | DF | (Italy) ITA | Gaetano Letizia | 30 | 1 | 25+4 | 1 | 1 | 0 |
| 5 | DF | (Italy) ITA | Fabio Lucioni | 9 | 0 | 8 | 0 | 1 | 0 |
| 6 | DF | (Albania) ALB | Berat Djimsiti | 30 | 0 | 30 | 0 | 0 | 0 |
| 16 | DF | (Romania) ROU | Alin Toșca | 13 | 0 | 13 | 0 | 0 | 0 |
| 18 | DF | (Ghana) GHA | Bright Gyamfi | 9 | 0 | 2+7 | 0 | 0 | 0 |
| 21 | DF | (Italy) ITA | Andrea Costa | 16 | 0 | 16 | 0 | 0 | 0 |
| 23 | DF | (Italy) ITA | Lorenzo Venuti | 32 | 0 | 25+6 | 0 | 0+1 | 0 |
| 29 | DF | (France) FRA | Jean-Claude Billong | 5 | 0 | 3+2 | 0 | 0 | 0 |
| 77 | DF | (Morocco) MAR | Achraf Lazaar | 9 | 1 | 6+3 | 1 | 0 | 0 |
| 83 | DF | (France) FRA | Bacary Sagna | 13 | 1 | 10+3 | 1 | 0 | 0 |
| 88 | DF | (Italy) ITA | Luca Antei | 8 | 0 | 8 | 0 | 0 | 0 |
| 91 | DF | (Italy) ITA | Luca Sparandeo | 1 | 0 | 0+1 | 0 | 0 | 0 |
Midfielders
| 4 | MF | (Italy) ITA | Lorenzo Del Pinto | 16 | 0 | 7+8 | 0 | 1 | 0 |
| 7 | MF | (Italy) ITA | Marco D'Alessandro | 17 | 1 | 12+4 | 1 | 1 | 0 |
| 8 | MF | (Italy) ITA | Danilo Cataldi | 30 | 1 | 25+4 | 1 | 1 | 0 |
| 14 | MF | (Italy) ITA | Nicolas Viola | 25 | 2 | 20+4 | 2 | 0+1 | 0 |
| 20 | MF | (Albania) ALB | Ledian Memushaj | 17 | 0 | 15+2 | 0 | 0 | 0 |
| 30 | MF | (Brazil) BRA | Sandro | 14 | 1 | 13+1 | 1 | 0 | 0 |
| 31 | MF | (Serbia) SRB | Filip Đuričić | 15 | 0 | 13+2 | 0 | 0 | 0 |
| 66 | MF | (Brazil) BRA | Guilherme | 12 | 2 | 11+1 | 2 | 0 | 0 |
| 73 | MF | (Italy) ITA | Giovanni Volpicelli | 1 | 0 | 0+1 | 0 | 0 | 0 |
| 98 | MF | (Italy) ITA | Alessio Donnarumma | 0 | 0 | 0 | 0 | 0 | 0 |
Forwards
| 11 | FW | (Italy) ITA | Massimo Coda | 25 | 4 | 14+10 | 4 | 1 | 0 |
| 25 | FW | (Mali) MLI | Cheick Diabaté | 11 | 8 | 7+4 | 8 | 0 | 0 |
| 26 | FW | (Italy) ITA | Vittorio Parigini | 21 | 0 | 10+11 | 0 | 0 | 0 |
| 33 | FW | (Italy) ITA | Pietro Iemmello | 16 | 2 | 12+4 | 2 | 0 | 0 |
| 60 | FW | (Ivory Coast) CIV | Siriki Sanogo | 2 | 0 | 0+2 | 0 | 0 | 0 |
| 87 | FW | (Italy) ITA | Cristiano Lombardi | 17 | 0 | 13+4 | 0 | 0 | 0 |
| 99 | FW | (Italy) ITA | Enrico Brignola | 19 | 3 | 16+2 | 3 | 0+1 | 0 |
Players transferred out during the season
| 1 | GK | (Slovenia) SVN | Vid Belec | 14 | 0 | 13 | 0 | 1 | 0 |
| 9 | FW | (Italy) ITA | Fabio Ceravolo | 1 | 0 | 1 | 0 | 0 | 0 |
| 10 | MF | (Italy) ITA | Amato Ciciretti | 13 | 2 | 9+3 | 2 | 1 | 0 |
| 13 | MF | (Ghana) GHA | Raman Chibsah | 14 | 0 | 12+2 | 0 | 0 | 0 |
| 15 | DF | (Italy) ITA | Michele Camporese | 1 | 0 | 0 | 0 | 1 | 0 |
| 17 | DF | (Italy) ITA | Gianluca Di Chiara | 14 | 0 | 11+2 | 0 | 1 | 0 |
| 19 | FW | (Guinea) GUI | Karamoko Cissé | 2 | 0 | 0+2 | 0 | 0 | 0 |
| 24 | FW | (Senegal) SEN | Mamadou Kanoute | 2 | 0 | 0+2 | 0 | 0 | 0 |
| 32 | FW | (Romania) ROU | George Pușcaș | 12 | 1 | 7+4 | 1 | 1 | 0 |
| 90 | FW | (Sweden) SWE | Samuel Armenteros | 9 | 1 | 5+4 | 1 | 0 | 0 |
| 95 | DF | (France) FRA | Andreaw Gravillon | 2 | 0 | 1+1 | 0 | 0 | 0 |

Last updated: 20 May 2018
Source: Competitions

=== Goalscorers ===
| Rank | No. | Pos | Nat | Name | Serie A | Coppa Italia | Total |
|---|---|---|---|---|---|---|---|
| 1 | 25 | FW | (Mali) | Cheick Diabaté | 8 | 0 | 8 |
| 2 | 11 | FW | (Italy) | Massimo Coda | 4 | 0 | 4 |
| 3 | 99 | FW | (Italy) | Enrico Brignola | 3 | 0 | 3 |
| 4 | 10 | MF | (Italy) | Amato Ciciretti | 2 | 0 | 2 |
| 4 | 14 | MF | (Italy) | Nicolas Viola | 2 | 0 | 2 |
| 4 | 33 | FW | (Italy) | Pietro Iemmello | 2 | 0 | 2 |
| 4 | 66 | MF | (Brazil) | Guilherme | 2 | 0 | 2 |
| 8 | 3 | DF | (Italy) | Gaetano Letizia | 1 | 0 | 1 |
| 8 | 7 | MF | (Italy) | Marco D'Alessandro | 1 | 0 | 1 |
| 8 | 8 | MF | (Italy) | Danilo Cataldi | 1 | 0 | 1 |
| 8 | 22 | GK | (Italy) | Alberto Brignoli | 1 | 0 | 1 |
| 8 | 30 | MF | (Brazil) | Sandro | 1 | 0 | 1 |
| 8 | 32 | FW | (Romania) | George Pușcaș | 1 | 0 | 1 |
| 8 | 77 | DF | (Morocco) | Achraf Lazaar | 1 | 0 | 1 |
| 8 | 83 | DF | (France) | Bacary Sagna | 1 | 0 | 1 |
| 8 | 90 | FW | (Sweden) | Samuel Armenteros | 1 | 0 | 1 |
| Own goal | | | | | 1 | 0 | 1 |
| Totals | | | | | 33 | 0 | 33 |

Last updated: 20 May 2018

=== Clean sheets ===
| Rank | No. | Pos | Nat | Name | Serie A | Coppa Italia | Total |
|---|---|---|---|---|---|---|---|
| 1 | 81 | GK | (Italy) | Christian Puggioni | 2 | 0 | 2 |
| 2 | 1 | GK | (Slovenia) | Vid Belec | 1 | 0 | 1 |
| 2 | 22 | GK | (Italy) | Alberto Brignoli | 1 | 0 | 1 |
| Totals | | | | | 4 | 0 | 4 |

Last updated: 20 May 2018

=== Disciplinary record ===
| No. | Pos | Nat | Name | Serie A | | | Coppa Italia | | | Total | | |
| No. | Pos | Nat | Name | Booked | (yellow card) (yellow-red card) | Sent off (straight red) | Booked | (yellow card) (yellow-red card) | Sent off (straight red) | Booked | (yellow card) (yellow-red card) | Sent off (straight red) |
| 1 | GK | (Slovenia) | Vid Belec | 1 | 0 | 1 | 1 | 0 | 0 | 2 | 0 | 1 |
| 22 | GK | (Italy) | Alberto Brignoli | 2 | 0 | 0 | 0 | 0 | 0 | 2 | 0 | 0 |
| 81 | GK | (Italy) | Christian Puggioni | 0 | 0 | 1 | 0 | 0 | 0 | 0 | 0 | 1 |
| 3 | DF | (Italy) | Gaetano Letizia | 5 | 1 | 0 | 0 | 0 | 0 | 5 | 1 | 0 |
| 5 | DF | (Italy) | Fabio Lucioni | 1 | 0 | 0 | 0 | 0 | 0 | 1 | 0 | 0 |
| 6 | DF | (Albania) | Berat Djimsiti | 2 | 0 | 0 | 0 | 0 | 0 | 2 | 0 | 0 |
| 16 | DF | (Romania) | Alin Toșca | 1 | 0 | 0 | 0 | 0 | 0 | 1 | 0 | 0 |
| 17 | DF | (Italy) | Gianluca Di Chiara | 3 | 0 | 0 | 0 | 0 | 0 | 3 | 0 | 0 |
| 18 | DF | (Ghana) | Bright Gyamfi | 1 | 0 | 0 | 0 | 0 | 0 | 1 | 0 | 0 |
| 21 | DF | (Italy) | Andrea Costa | 5 | 0 | 0 | 0 | 0 | 0 | 5 | 0 | 0 |
| 23 | DF | (Italy) | Lorenzo Venuti | 4 | 0 | 0 | 0 | 0 | 0 | 4 | 0 | 0 |
| 83 | DF | (France) | Bacary Sagna | 1 | 0 | 0 | 0 | 0 | 0 | 1 | 0 | 0 |
| 88 | DF | (Italy) | Luca Antei | 1 | 0 | 1 | 0 | 0 | 0 | 1 | 0 | 1 |
| 91 | DF | (Italy) | Luca Sparandeo | 1 | 0 | 0 | 0 | 0 | 0 | 1 | 0 | 0 |
| 4 | MF | (Italy) | Lorenzo Del Pinto | 6 | 0 | 0 | 0 | 0 | 0 | 6 | 0 | 0 |
| 7 | MF | (Italy) | Marco D'Alessandro | 1 | 0 | 0 | 0 | 0 | 0 | 1 | 0 | 0 |
| 8 | MF | (Italy) | Danilo Cataldi | 9 | 1 | 0 | 0 | 0 | 0 | 9 | 1 | 0 |
| 13 | MF | (Ghana) | Raman Chibsah | 4 | 0 | 0 | 0 | 0 | 0 | 4 | 0 | 0 |
| 14 | MF | (Italy) | Nicolas Viola | 1 | 1 | 0 | 0 | 0 | 0 | 1 | 1 | 0 |
| 20 | MF | (Albania) | Ledian Memushaj | 3 | 0 | 0 | 0 | 0 | 0 | 3 | 0 | 0 |
| 30 | MF | (Brazil) | Sandro | 4 | 0 | 0 | 0 | 0 | 0 | 4 | 0 | 0 |
| 31 | MF | (Serbia) | Filip Đuričić | 1 | 0 | 0 | 0 | 0 | 0 | 1 | 0 | 0 |
| 66 | MF | (Brazil) | Guilherme | 1 | 0 | 0 | 0 | 0 | 0 | 1 | 0 | 0 |
| 11 | FW | (Italy) | Massimo Coda | 1 | 0 | 0 | 0 | 0 | 0 | 1 | 0 | 0 |
| 25 | FW | (Mali) | Cheick Diabaté | 0 | 1 | 0 | 0 | 0 | 0 | 0 | 1 | 0 |
| 26 | FW | (Italy) | Vittorio Parigini | 2 | 0 | 0 | 0 | 0 | 0 | 2 | 0 | 0 |
| 87 | FW | (Italy) | Cristiano Lombardi | 3 | 0 | 0 | 0 | 0 | 0 | 3 | 0 | 0 |
| 90 | FW | (Sweden) | Samuel Armenteros | 1 | 0 | 0 | 0 | 0 | 0 | 1 | 0 | 0 |
| 99 | FW | (Italy) | Enrico Brignola | 5 | 0 | 0 | 0 | 0 | 0 | 5 | 0 | 0 |
| Totals | | | | 69 | 4 | 3 | 1 | 0 | 0 | 70 | 4 | 3 |

Last updated: 20 May 2018

== See also ==
- History of Benevento Calcio
