= 2021–22 Benevento Calcio season =

Benevento
2021–22 season
- Chairman: Oreste Vigorito
- Manager: Fabio Caserta
- Stadium: Stadio Ciro Vigorito
- Serie B: 7th (play-off semi-finals)
- Coppa Italia: Second round
- Top goalscorer: League: Gianluca Lapadula (11); All: Gianluca Lapadula (14)
Home colours	Away colours	Third colours

The 2021–22 season was Benevento's first season back in Serie B following its relegation from the top-flight of Italian football in the previous season. It was the club's fourth season in Serie B in its history. In addition to the domestic league, Benevento participated in this season's edition of the Coppa Italia.

== Players ==
=== First-team squad ===
As of 17 July 2021

Note: Flags indicate national team as defined under FIFA eligibility rules; some limited exceptions apply. Players may hold more than one non-FIFA nationality.

No.	Pos.	Nation	Player
1	GK	ITA	Lorenzo Montipò
3	DF	ITA	Gaetano Letizia
5	DF	ITA	Luca Caldirola
8	MF	COL	Andrés Tello
9	FW	PER	Gianluca Lapadula
12	GK	ITA	Nicolò Manfredini
15	DF	POL	Kamil Glik
16	MF	ITA	Riccardo Improta
18	DF	BEL	Daam Foulon
19	MF	ITA	Roberto Insigne
20	FW	ITA	Giuseppe Di Serio
21	FW	ITA	Gabriele Moncini
25	FW	ITA	Marco Sau
26	MF	CIV	Siriki Sanogo
28	MF	ITA	Pasquale Schiattarella (vice-captain)

No.	Pos.	Nation	Player
29	MF	MDA	Artur Ioniță
58	DF	ITA	Christian Pastina
93	DF	ITA	Federico Barba
—	GK	ITA	Alberto Paleari (on loan from Genoa)
—	DF	CMR	Jean-Claude Billong
—	DF	ITA	Francesco Rillo
—	DF	ITA	Luca Sparandeo
—	MF	GHA	Abdallah Basit
—	MF	ITA	Giacomo Calò (on loan from Genoa)
—	MF	ITA	Marco Cuccurullo
—	MF	JPN	Cy Goddard
—	MF	GER	Oliver Kragl
—	MF	SLO	Dejan Vokić
—	MF	ITA	Giovanni Volpicelli

== Pre-season and friendlies ==
Win Draw Loss Fixtures

22 July 2021 Friendly	Benevento	2–2	Foligno	Benevento, Italy
16:00 CEST (UTC+2)				Stadium: Stadio Ciro Vigorito

29 July 2021 Friendly	Benevento	3–1	Reggina	Benevento, Italy
16:00 CEST (UTC+2)				Stadium: Stadio Ciro Vigorito

7 August 2021 Friendly	Frosinone	2–2	Benevento	Frosinone, Italy
18:30 CEST (UTC+2)				Stadium: Stadio Benito Stirpe

10 August 2021 Friendly	Puteolana	0–2	Benevento	Pozzuoli, Italy
17:30 CEST (UTC+2)				Stadium: Stadio Domenico Conte

6 September 2021 Friendly	Napoli	1–5	Benevento	Naples, Italy
21:00 CEST (UTC+2)	Politano 63' (pen.)		Calò 23'; Improta 34', (yellow card) 44'; Basit (yellow card) 54'; Vokić (yellow card) 60'; Foulon 67'; Tello (yellow card) 79'; Insigne 85' (pen.); Umile 89'	Stadium: Stadio San Paolo; Referee: Davide Miele

== Competitions ==
=== Overall record ===
Competition	First match	Last match	Starting round	Final position	Record							
Competition	First match	Last match	Starting round	Final position	Pld	W	D	L	GF	GA	GD	Win %
Serie B	22 August 2021	6 May 2022	Matchday 1	7th	38	18	9	11	62	39	+23	47.37
Serie B promotion play-offs	13 May 2022	21 May 2022	Preliminary round	Semi-finals	3	2	0	1	2	1	+1	66.67
Coppa Italia	14 August 2021	15 December 2021	First round	Second round	2	1	0	1	3	3	+0	50.00
Total					43	21	9	13	67	43	+24	48.84

Last updated: 21 May 2022

=== Serie B ===
==== League table ====
Pos	Team	Pld	W	D	L	GF	GA	GD	Pts	Promotion, qualification or relegation
5	Brescia	38	17	15	6	55	35	+20	66	Promotion play-offs preliminary round
6	Ascoli	38	19	8	11	52	42	+10	65	Promotion play-offs preliminary round
7	Benevento	38	18	9	11	62	39	+23	63	Promotion play-offs preliminary round
8	Perugia	38	14	16	8	40	32	+8	58 (Note: Perugia finished ahead of Frosinone on head-to-head points: Frosinone 0–0 Perugia, Perugia 3–0 Frosinone.)	Promotion play-offs preliminary round
9	Frosinone	38	15	13	10	58	45	+13	58	

Source: Lega Serie B (in Italian), Soccerway (in English)
Rules for classification: 1) Points; 2) Head-to-head points; 3) Head-to-head goal difference; 4) Goal difference; 5) Goals scored; 6) Draw.

==== Matches ====
The league fixtures were announced on 14 July 2021.

=== Coppa Italia ===
14 August 2021 First round	Benevento	2–1 (a.e.t.)	SPAL	Benevento
17:45 CEST	Improta 32'; Moncini 120+4' (pen.)	Report	Moncini 90+5' (o.g.)	Stadium: Stadio Ciro Vigorito; Attendance: 686; Referee: Francesco Cosso

15 December 2021 Second round	Fiorentina	2–1	Benevento	Florence
21:00 CET	Milenković 19'; Sottil 47'	Report	Moncini 51'	Stadium: Stadio Artemio Franchi; Attendance: 13,800; Referee: Luca Zufferli

== See also ==
- History of Benevento Calcio
