= 2016–17 Benevento Calcio season =

Benevento
2016–17 season
- President: Fabrizio Pallotta
- Manager: Marco Baroni
- Stadium: Stadio Ciro Vigorito
- Serie B: 5th (promoted via play-offs)
- Coppa Italia: Second round
- Top goalscorer: League: Fabio Ceravolo (20); All: Fabio Ceravolo (20)
- Highest home attendance: 13,987 vs Carpi (8 June 2017, Serie B play-offs)
- Lowest home attendance: 6,807 vs Spezia (29 October 2016, Serie B)
- Average home league attendance: 8,130
Home colours	Away colours	Third colours

The 2016–17 Benevento Calcio season was the club's 88th season and the club's second consecutive season in the second division of Italian football. In addition to the domestic league, Benevento participated in this season's edition of the Coppa Italia. The season covered the period from 1 July 2016 to 30 June 2017.

== Players ==
As of 27 January 2017.

Note: Flags indicate national team as defined under FIFA eligibility rules; some limited exceptions apply. Players may hold more than one non-FIFA nationality.

No.	Pos.	Nation	Player
1	GK	ITA	Alessio Cragno (on loan from Cagliari)
2	DF	ITA	Enrico Pezzi
4	MF	ITA	Lorenzo Del Pinto
5	DF	ITA	Fabio Lucioni
6	DF	URU	Wálter López
7	MF	ITA	Fabrizio Melara
9	FW	ITA	Fabio Ceravolo
10	FW	ITA	Amato Ciciretti
11	MF	CRO	Marko Pajač (on loan from Cagliari)
12	GK	ITA	Pier Graziano Gori
13	MF	GHA	Raman Chibsah (on loan from Sassuolo)
14	DF	ITA	Emanuele Padella
15	DF	ITA	Michele Camporese
16	DF	CRO	Ricardo Bagadur (on loan from Fiorentina)

No.	Pos.	Nation	Player
18	DF	GHA	Bright Gyamfi (on loan from Inter)
19	FW	GUI	Karamoko Cissé
20	MF	ITA	Filippo Falco (on loan from Bologna)
21	MF	ITA	Andrea De Falco
22	GK	ITA	Riccardo Piscitelli
23	DF	ITA	Lorenzo Venuti (on loan from Fiorentina)
24	FW	ROU	George Pușcaș (on loan from Inter)
25	FW	ITA	Enrico Brignola
27	MF	MKD	Nikola Jakimovski
30	MF	ITA	Daniele Buzzegoli
31	GK	ITA	Fabrizio Alastra (on loan from Palermo)
34	MF	ITA	Mirko Eramo
35	MF	ITA	Nicolas Viola
36	MF	ITA	Antonio Matera (on loan from Fidelis Andria)

== Competitions ==
=== Overall record ===
Competition	First match	Last match	Starting round	Final position	Record							
Competition	First match	Last match	Starting round	Final position	Pld	W	D	L	GF	GA	GD	Win %
Serie B	27 August 2016	18 May 2017	Matchday 1	5th	42	18	12	12	56	42	+14	42.86
Serie B promotion play-offs	23 May 2017	8 June 2017	Preliminary round	Winners	5	3	2	0	5	2	+3	60.00
Coppa Italia	7 August 2016		Second round	Second round	1	0	1	0	0	0	+0	0.00
Total					48	21	15	12	61	44	+17	43.75

Source: Competitions

=== Serie B ===
==== League table ====
Pos	Team	Pld	W	D	L	GF	GA	GD	Pts	Promotion, qualification or relegation
3	Frosinone	42	21	11	10	57	42	+15	74 (Note: Hellas Verona is ahead of Frosinone on head-to-head goal difference: Hellas Verona 2–0 Frosinone, Frosinone 1–0 Hellas Verona.)	Qualification to promotion play-offs semi-finals
4	Perugia	42	15	20	7	54	40	+14	65 (Note: Perugia is ahead of Benevento on head-to-head points: Perugia 3–1 Benevento, Benevento 0–0 Perugia.)	Qualification to promotion play-offs semi-finals
5	Benevento (Note: Benevento was deducted one point.) (O, P)	42	18	12	12	56	42	+14	65	Qualification to promotion play-offs preliminary round
6	Cittadella	42	19	6	17	60	54	+6	63	Qualification to promotion play-offs preliminary round
7	Carpi	42	16	14	12	41	40	+1	62	Qualification to promotion play-offs preliminary round

Source: Lega Serie B
Rules for classification: 1) Points; 2) Head-to-head points; 3) Head-to-head goal difference; 4) Goal difference; 5) Goals scored; 6) Draw.
(O) Play-off winners; (P) Promoted

==== Matches ====
27 August 2016 1	Benevento	2–0	SPAL	Benevento
CEST (UTC+2)				Stadium: Stadio Ciro Vigorito

4 September 2016 2	Carpi	1–1	Benevento	Carpi
CEST (UTC+2)				Stadium: Stadio Sandro Cabassi

10 September 2016 3	Benevento	2–0	Hellas Verona	Benevento
CEST (UTC+2)				Stadium: Stadio Ciro Vigorito

17 September 2016 4	Latina	1–1	Benevento	Latina
CEST (UTC+2)				Stadium: Stadio Domenico Francioni

20 September 2016 5	Benevento	1–1	Pro Vercelli	Benevento
CEST (UTC+2)

24 September 2016 6	Bari	0–4	Benevento	Bari
CEST (UTC+2)

1 October 2016 7	Benevento	1–0	Novara	Benevento
CEST (UTC+2)

9 October 2016 8	Salernitana	2–1	Benevento	Salerno
CEST (UTC+2)

16 October 2016 9	Virtus Entella	3–2	Benevento	Chiavari
CEST (UTC+2)

22 October 2016 10	Benevento	0–0	Perugia	Benevento
CEST (UTC+2)

25 October 2016 11	Trapani	1–0	Benevento	Trapani
CEST (UTC+2)

29 October 2016 12	Benevento	1–0	Spezia	Benevento
CEST (UTC+2)

7 November 2016 13	Ternana	0–1	Benevento	Terni
CEST (UTC+2)

13 November 2016 14	Benevento	1–0	Cittadella	Benevento
CEST (UTC+2)

19 November 2016 15	Benevento	4–0	Brescia	Benevento
CEST (UTC+2)

26 November 2016 16	Vicenza	0–0	Benevento	Vicenza
CEST (UTC+2)

5 December 2016 17	Benevento	2–1	Cesena	Benevento
CEST (UTC+2)

10 December 2016 18	Avellino	1–1	Benevento	Avellino
CEST (UTC+2)

18 December 2016 19	Benevento	0–0	Ascoli	Benevento
CEST (UTC+2)

24 December 2016 20	Frosinone	3–2	Benevento	Frosinone
CEST (UTC+2)

30 December 2016 21	Benevento	1–0	Pisa	Benevento
CEST (UTC+2)

21 January 2017 22	SPAL	2–0	Benevento	Ferrara
CEST (UTC+2)

28 January 2017 23	Benevento	3–0	Carpi	Benevento
CEST (UTC+2)

3 February 2017 24	Hellas Verona	2–2	Benevento	Verona
CEST (UTC+2)

11 February 2017 25	Benevento	2–1	Latina	Benevento
CEST (UTC+2)

18 February 2017 26	Pro Vercelli	0–1	Benevento	Vercelli
CEST (UTC+2)

24 February 2017 27	Benevento	3–4	Bari	Benevento
CEST (UTC+2)

28 February 2017 28	Novara	1–0	Benevento	Novara
CEST (UTC+2)

5 March 2017 29	Benevento	1–1	Salernitana	Benevento
CEST (UTC+2)

11 March 2017 30	Benevento	0–0	Virtus Entella	Benevento
CEST (UTC+2)

17 March 2017 31	Perugia	3–1	Benevento	Perugia
CEST (UTC+2)

25 March 2017 32	Benevento	1–3	Trapani	Benevento
CEST (UTC+2)

1 April 2017 33	Spezia	1–3	Benevento	La Spezia
CEST (UTC+2)

4 April 2017 34	Benevento	2–1	Ternana	Benevento
CEST (UTC+2)

8 April 2017 35	Cittadella	1–0	Benevento	Cittadella
CEST (UTC+2)

17 April 2017 36	Brescia	1–0	Benevento	Brescia
CEST (UTC+2)

21 April 2017 37	Benevento	0–0	Vicenza	Benevento
CEST (UTC+2)

25 April 2017 38	Cesena	4–1	Benevento	Cesena
CEST (UTC+2)

1 May 2017 39	Benevento	2–1	Avellino	Benevento
CEST (UTC+2)

6 May 2017 40	Ascoli	1–1	Benevento	Ascoli Piceno
CEST (UTC+2)

13 May 2017 41	Benevento	2–1	Frosinone	Benevento
CEST (UTC+2)

18 May 2017 42	Pisa	0–3	Benevento	Pisa
CEST (UTC+2)

==== Promotion play-offs ====
23 May 2017 Preliminary round	Benevento	2–1	Spezia	Benevento
CEST (UTC+2)				Stadium: Stadio Ciro Vigorito

27 May 2017 Semi-finals; First leg	Benevento	1–0	Perugia	Benevento
CEST (UTC+2)				Stadium: Stadio Ciro Vigorito

30 May 2017 Semi-finals; Second leg	Perugia	1–1	Benevento	Perugia
CEST (UTC+2)				Stadium: Stadio Renato Curi

4 June 2017 Final; First leg	Carpi	0–0	Benevento	Carpi
CEST (UTC+2)				Stadium: Stadio Sandro Cabassi

8 June 2017 Final; Second leg	Benevento	1–0	Carpi	Benevento
CEST (UTC+2)				Stadium: Stadio Ciro Vigorito

=== Coppa Italia ===
7 August 2016 Second round	Benevento	0–0 (a.e.t.) (2–4 p)	Salernitana	Benevento
20:30 CEST (UTC+2)				Stadium: Ciro Vigorito; Attendance: 6,855; Referee: Aleandro Di Paolo
	Penalties
	Mazzeo (penalty scored); Lucioni (penalty scored); Ceravolo (penalty missed); De Falco (penalty missed)		(penalty scored) Vitale; (penalty scored) Coda; (penalty scored) Zito; (penalty scored) Donnarumma

== See also ==
- History of Benevento Calcio
