= Benevento Calcio Youth Sector =

- Full name: Benevento Calcio Youth Sector
- Nicknames: Stregoni, Streghe, Giallorossi, Sanniti
- Ground: Stadio Ciro Vigorito, Benevento, Italy
- Capacity: 17,554
- President: Oreste Vigorito
- Manager: Nicola Romaniello (Under-19 Primavera squad)
- League: Campionato Primavera 2
- 2016–17: Campionato Primavera 2 (Girone B), 13th
- Website: https://giovanili.beneventocalcio.club/
Home colours	Away colours	Third colours

Benevento Calcio Youth Sector (Italian: Settore Giovanile) comprises the under-19 team and the academy of Italian professional football club Benevento Calcio. The under-19 squad competes in Group B of the Campionato Primavera 2.

== Primavera ==
=== Current squad ===
As of 18 February 2021

Note: Flags indicate national team as defined under FIFA eligibility rules; some limited exceptions apply. Players may hold more than one non-FIFA nationality.

No.	Pos.	Nation	Player
—	GK	ITA	Michele Diglio
—	GK	ITA	Antonio Gervasio
—	GK	ITA	Vincenzo Quartarone
—	DF	ITA	Mario Andreozzi
—	DF	ITA	Mattia Barilotti
—	DF	ITA	Andrea Bottiglieri
—	DF	ITA	Mattia Bracale
—	DF	ITA	Aniello Ciaravolo
—	DF	ITA	Alessandro Foggia
—	DF	ITA	Francesco Perlingieri
—	DF	ITA	Francesco Todisco
—	DF	ITA	Armando Vigorito
—	DF	ITA	Leopoldo Vitale
—	MF	ITA	Emanuele Agnello
—	MF	ITA	Vincenzo Alfieri

No.	Pos.	Nation	Player
—	MF	ITA	Simone Cesarano
—	MF	GHA	Amadou Diambo
—	MF	ITA	Costantino Pietrolungo
—	MF	ITA	Antonio Strazzullo
—	MF	ITA	Angelo Talla
—	FW	ITA	Gaetano Caserta
—	FW	ITA	Nicola Garofalo
—	FW	ITA	Michele Gennarelli
—	FW	ITA	Francesco Giampaolo
—	FW	ITA	Luca Moschini
—	FW	ITA	Vincenzo Olimpio
—	FW	ITA	Samuele Sorrentino
—	FW	SEN	Pape Samba Thiam
—	FW	ALB	Erik Troqe

== Non-playing staff (under-19 squad) ==
- Director:
- Head Coach: Nicola Romaniello
- Fitness Coach: Manuel Addona
- Goalkeeping Coach: Antonio Gemma
- Team Doctor: Luca Milano
- Physiotherapist:

== Under-17 squad ==
Note: Flags indicate national team as defined under FIFA eligibility rules; some limited exceptions apply. Players may hold more than one non-FIFA nationality.

No.	Pos.	Nation	Player
—	GK	ITA	Stefano Carriero
—	GK	ITA	Thomas Picerno
—	GK	ITA	Francesco Emanuele Stasi
—	DF	ITA	Andrea De Siena
—	DF	ITA	Luigi Di Palma
—	DF	ITA	Luca Di Ronza
—	DF	ITA	Manfredi Gargiulo
—	DF	ITA	Mattia Mirabile
—	DF	ITA	Christian Diego Pastina
—	DF	ITA	Michele Peluso
—	DF	ITA	Giuseppe Pepe
—	MF	ITA	Cosimo Federico
—	MF	ITA	Gianluca Landolfi

No.	Pos.	Nation	Player
—	MF	ITA	Giuseppe Mirante
—	MF	ITA	Gennaro Pignatelli
—	MF	ITA	Emanuele Ruggiero
—	MF	ITA	Domenico Russo
—	MF	ITA	Andrea Tartaglione
—	FW	ITA	Giuseppe Di Serio
—	FW	ITA	Vincenzo Dublino
—	FW	ITA	Alessandro Lenzi
—	FW	ITA	Gaetano Mancino
—	FW	ITA	Arturo Onda
—	FW	CIV	Siriky Sanogo
—	FW	ITA	Mario Strianese

== Non-playing staff (under-17 squad) ==
- Director:
- Head Coach: Pasquale Bovienzo
- Fitness Coach: Alfredo Genco
- Goalkeeping Coach: Pietro Parascandolo
- Team Doctor: Luca Milano
- Physiotherapist: Pasquale Di Mauro
