= Dejan Vokić =

Slovenian footballer (born 1996)

Personal information
- Date of birth: 12 June 1996 (age 30)
- Place of birth: Ljubljana, Slovenia
- Height: 1.93 m (6 ft 4 in)
- Position: Midfielder

Youth career
- –2011: Triglav Kranj
- 2011–2014: Bravo
- 2015: Maribor

Senior career*
Years	Team	Apps	(Gls)
2015–2018	Maribor	2	(0)
2015–2016	Maribor B	29	(4)
2016	→ Krško (loan)	9	(0)
2017	→ Veržej (loan)	8	(1)
2018	Triglav Kranj	14	(0)
2018	Zagłębie Sosnowiec	15	(0)
2019–2023	Benevento	15	(0)
2020–2021	→ Pescara (loan)	12	(1)
2022	→ Pordenone (loan)	10	(0)
2023–2024	Radomlje	28	(3)
2025–2026	Radomlje	27	(3)

International career
2014	Slovenia U19	12	(1)
2017–2018	Slovenia U21	9	(0)
- * Club domestic league appearances and goals as of 11 February 2026

Dejan Vokić (born 12 June 1996) is a Slovenian professional footballer who plays as a midfielder.

== Career ==
On 13 February 2019, Vokić signed a two-and-a-half-year contract with Italian Serie B club Benevento.

On 5 October 2020, he joined Pescara on loan.

On 18 January 2022, he moved on loan to Pordenone until the end of the season.

In August 2025, Vokić received a three-year and 30-day ban from playing by the Italian Football Federation for betting on 304 football matches through Eurobet in 2023. The ban initially applied only to competitions governed by the Italian Football Federation, but in 2026 it was extended to all competitions under the global jurisdiction of UEFA and FIFA.

== Career statistics ==
As of 12 June 2024

Appearances and goals by club, season and competition
Club	Season	League			National cup (Note: Includes Slovenian Cup, Polish Cup, Coppa Italia)		Total	
Club	Season	Division	Apps	Goals	Apps	Goals	Apps	Goals
Maribor	2014–15	Slovenian PrvaLiga	2	0	1	0	3	0
Maribor	2015–16	Slovenian PrvaLiga	0	0	1	0	1	0
Maribor	2016–17	Slovenian PrvaLiga	0	0	0	0	0	0
Maribor	2017–18	Slovenian PrvaLiga	0	0	0	0	0	0
Maribor	Total		2	0	2	0	4	0
Maribor B	2014–15	Slovenian Third League	7	1	—		7	1
Maribor B	2015–16	Slovenian Third League	22	3	—		22	3
Maribor B	Total		29	4	0	0	29	4
Krško (loan)	2016–17	Slovenian PrvaLiga	9	0	1	0	10	0
Veržej (loan)	2016–17	Slovenian Second League	8	1	0	0	8	1
Triglav Kranj	2017–18	Slovenian PrvaLiga	14	0	0	0	14	0
Zagłębie Sosnowiec	2018–19	Ekstraklasa	15	1	1	0	16	1
Benevento	2018–19	Serie B	5	0	0	0	5	0
Benevento	2019–20	Serie B	2	0	0	0	2	0
Benevento	2021–22	Serie B	6	0	1	0	7	0
Benevento	2022–23	Serie B	2	0	1	0	3	0
Benevento	Total		15	0	2	0	17	0
Pescara (loan)	2020–21	Serie B	12	1	0	0	12	1
Pordenone (loan)	2021–22	Serie B	10	0	0	0	10	0
Radomlje	2023–24	Slovenian PrvaLiga	28	3	5	2	33	5
Career total			142	10	11	2	153	12

== Honours ==
Maribor

- Slovenian PrvaLiga: 2014–15
- Slovenian Cup: 2015–16

Maribor B

- Slovenian Third League: 2014–15
