= Lorenzo Venuti =

Italian footballer (born 1995)

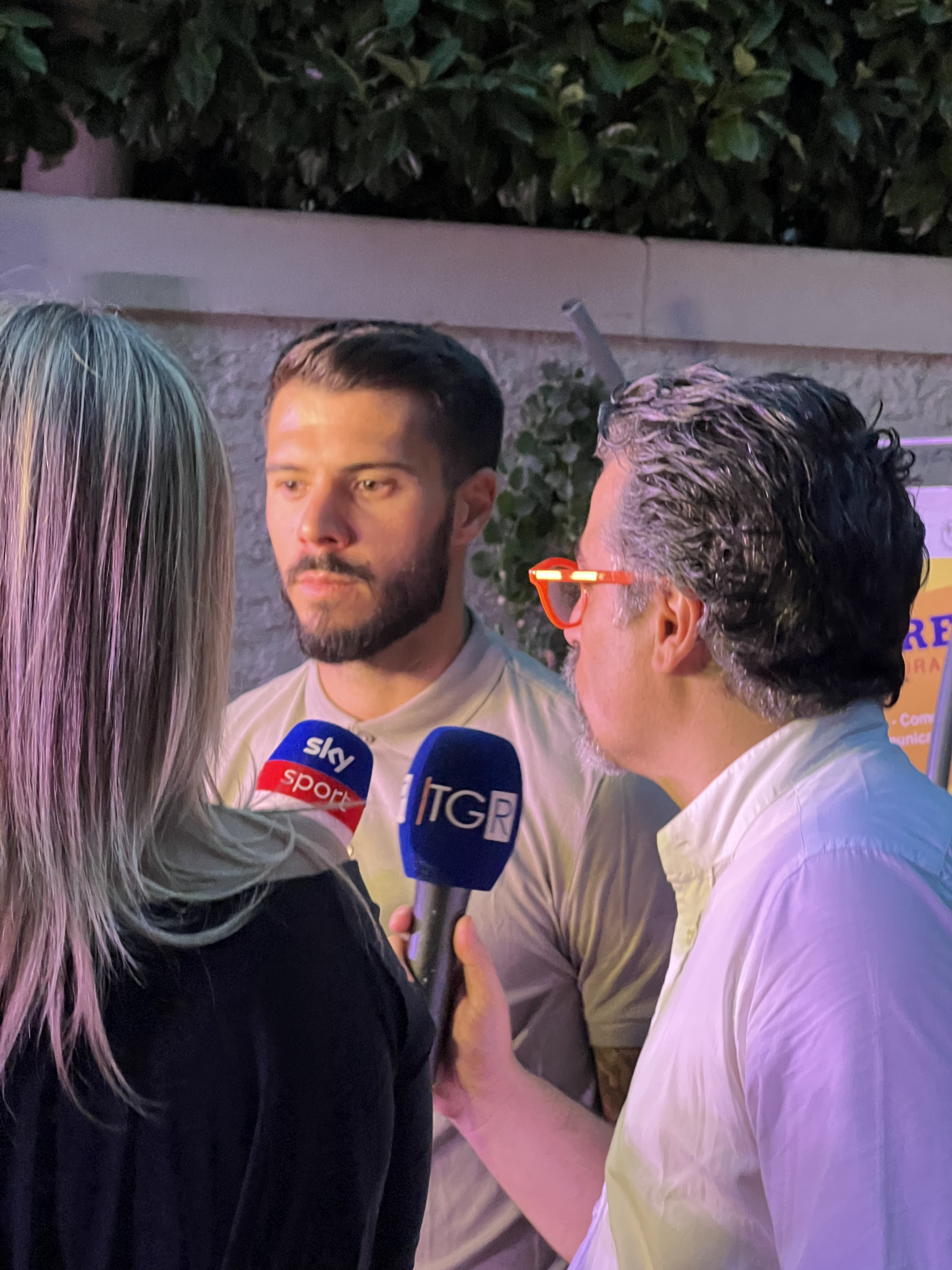
- Venuti in 2022

Personal information
- Date of birth: 12 April 1995 (age 31)
- Place of birth: Montevarchi, Italy
- Height: 1.80 m (5 ft 11 in)
- Position: Full-back

Youth career
- 2002–2004: Ideal Club Incisa
- 2004–2014: Fiorentina
- 2014–2015: → Pescara (loan)

Senior career*
Years	Team	Apps	(Gls)
2014–2023	Fiorentina	84	(0)
2014–2015	→ Pescara (loan)	0	(0)
2015–2016	→ Brescia (loan)	27	(0)
2016–2018	→ Benevento (loan)	68	(0)
2018–2019	→ Lecce (loan)	32	(3)
2023–2024	Lecce	14	(0)
2024–2026	Sampdoria	46	(2)

International career
2012–2013	Italy U18	10	(0)
2013–2014	Italy U19	6	(0)
2015–2016	Italy U20	4	(0)
2015	Italy U21	1	(0)
- * Club domestic league appearances and goals as of 8 May 2026

Lorenzo Venuti (born 12 April 1995) is an Italian professional footballer who plays as a full-back.

== Club career ==
Born in Montevarchi, Tuscany, Venuti started his career at Tuscan club Fiorentina. On 30 July 2014, he was signed by Serie B club Pescara on a temporary deal, with an option to sign him outright. Venuti was assigned the number 23 shirt for the first team. However, he was only able to play for their reserve team as an overage player. On 27 June 2015, Pescara excised the option to sign Venuti outright, but La Viola also excised the counter-option.

On 16 July 2015, he was signed by Lega Pro newcomers Brescia on a temporary deal, with an option to buy. Brescia was confirmed as the replacement of Parma in the 2015–16 Serie B on 4 August. On 2 August, Venuti made his professional debut against Cremonese, in the 2015–16 Coppa Italia. He was partnered with his former national team teammate Michele Somma in the defensive line-up.

== International career ==
On 5 November 2015, Venuti received his first under-20 team call-up from Alberigo Evani.

Two days after making his professional debut, he received his first under-21 team call-up from Luigi Di Biagio. Venuti made his debut against Hungary coming on in place of Andrea Conti.

He played twice in the 2014 UEFA European Under-19 Championship qualification round. Venuti and Somma were in the starting line-up in the second match, replacing defenders Filippo Berra and Alessio Romagnoli. Romagnoli returned to the starting line-up in the third match, while Venuti replaced Luca Iotti in the 74th minute.

== Personal life ==
In May 2020 Venuti tested positive for COVID-19.

== Career statistics ==
=== Club ===
As of match played 16 March 2025

Appearances and goals by club, season and competition
Club	Season	League			National Cup (Note: Includes Coppa Italia)		Europe		Other		Total	
Club	Season	Division	Apps	Goals	Apps	Goals	Apps	Goals	Apps	Goals	Apps	Goals
Brescia (loan)	2015–16	Serie B	27	0	2	0	—		—		29	0
Benevento (loan)	2016–17	Serie B	37	0	1	0	—		3 (Note: Appearance(s) in Serie B promotion play-offs)	0	41	0
Benevento (loan)	2017–18	Serie A	31	0	1	0	—		—		32	0
Benevento (loan)	Total		68	0	2	0	—		3	0	73	0
Lecce (loan)	2018–19	Serie B	32	3	—		—		—		32	3
Fiorentina	2019–20	Serie A	16	0	2	0	—		—		18	0
Fiorentina	2020–21	Serie A	28	0	2	1	—		—		30	1
Fiorentina	2021–22	Serie A	23	0	5	2	—		—		28	2
Fiorentina	2022–23	Serie A	17	0	0	0	7 (Note: Appearance(s) in UEFA Conference League)	0	—		24	0
Fiorentina	Total		84	0	9	3	7	0	—		100	3
Lecce	2023–24	Serie A	14	0	1	0	—		—		15	0
Sampdoria	2024–25	Serie A	26	2	2	0	—		—		28	2
Career total			251	5	16	3	7	0	3	0	277	8

== Honours ==
Fiorentina

- Coppa Italia runner-up: 2022–23
- UEFA Europa Conference League runner-up: 2022–23
