= Nicolas Viola =

Italian footballer (born 1989)

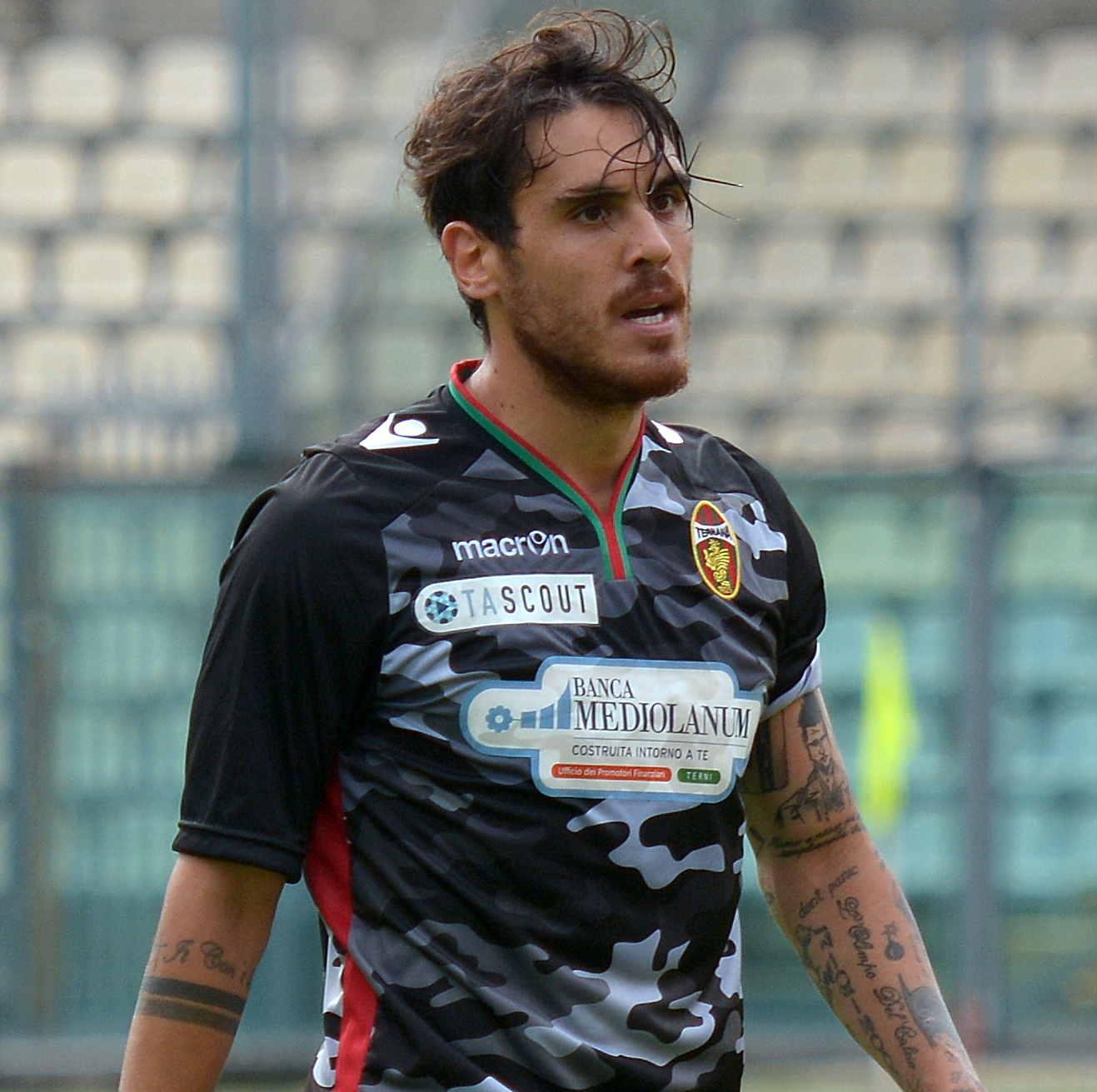
- Viola plays with Ternana in 2012

Personal information
- Full name: Benito Nicolas Viola
- Date of birth: 12 October 1989 (age 37)
- Place of birth: Oppido Mamertina, Italy
- Height: 1.80 m (5 ft 11 in)
- Position: Central midfielder

Team information
- Current team: Ravenna
- Number: 19

Youth career
- 2006–2008: Reggina

Senior career*
Years	Team	Apps	(Gls)
2008–2012	Reggina	67	(13)
2012–2013	Palermo	6	(0)
2013–2015	Ternana	64	(4)
2015–2017	Novara	60	(6)
2017–2021	Benevento	106	(21)
2021–2022	Bologna	6	(0)
2022–2025	Cagliari	69	(9)
2025–	Ravenna	10	(0)

International career
2005	Italy U17	4	(0)
2006–2007	Italy U18	3	(0)
2007	Italy U19	5	(3)
- * Club domestic league appearances and goals as of 30 April 2026

Benito Nicolas Viola (born 12 October 1989) is an Italian footballer who plays as a midfielder for Serie C Group B club Ravenna. He is the older brother of fellow footballer Alessio Viola.

== Career ==
=== Reggina ===
Viola was born in Oppido Mamertina, in the same province of Reggina Calcio. Viola made his Serie A debut for Reggina on 11 January 2009 against S.S. Lazio. He also played twice at 2008–09 Coppa Italia.

=== Palermo ===
On 30 January 2012, Palermo announced to have purchased Viola from Reggina in a co-ownership agreement with the club, for €1.8 million in a 4 1/2-year contract. The player would stay on loan at Reggina until the end of the 2011–12 Serie B season.

=== Ternana ===
On 1 July 2013, Ternana acquired Viola from Reggina, with Palermo retained the 50% registration rights. In June 2015 the co-ownership deal expired, as Ternana did not purchase him from Palermo. However, Palermo also released Viola for free.

=== Novara ===
On 2 August 2015, Viola was signed by Novara Calcio.

=== Benevento ===
On 31 January 2017, Viola was signed by Benevento in a 2 1/2-year contract.

=== Bologna ===
On 20 October 2021, he signed with Bologna.

=== Cagliari ===
On 2 July 2022, Viola joined Cagliari on a two-year contract.

=== Ravenna ===
On 26 November 2025, Viola signed with Ravenna playing in Serie C.

== Career statistics ==
=== Club ===
As of match played 25 May 2025

Appearances and goals by club, season and competition
Club	Season	League			National Cup (Note: Includes Coppa Italia)		Europe		Other		Total	
Club	Season	Division	Apps	Goals	Apps	Goals	Apps	Goals	Apps	Goals	Apps	Goals
Reggina	2007–08	Serie A	0	0	1	0	—		—		1	0
Reggina	2008–09	Serie A	5	0	2	0	—		—		7	0
Reggina	2009–10	Serie B	9	2	1	0	—		—		10	2
Reggina	2010–11	Serie B	30	5	1	0	—		1 (Note: Appearance(s) in Serie B play-off)	0	32	5
Reggina	2011–12	Serie B	22	6	1	0	—		—		23	6
Reggina	Total		66	13	6	0	—		1	0	73	13
Palermo	2012–13	Serie A	6	0	1	0	—		—		7	0
Ternana	2013–14	Serie B	25	1	1	0	—		—		26	1
Ternana	2014–15	Serie B	39	3	2	0	—		—		41	3
Ternana	Total		64	4	3	0	—		—		67	4
Novara	2015–16	Serie B	37	3	2	1	—		2	0	41	4
Novara	2016–17	Serie B	21	3	2	0	—		—		23	3
Novara	Total		58	6	4	1	—		2	0	64	7
Benevento	2016–17	Serie B	14	0	0	0	—		5	0	19	0
Benevento	2017–18	Serie A	24	2	1	0	—		—		25	2
Benevento	2018–19	Serie B	24	5	2	1	—		2	0	28	6
Benevento	2019–20	Serie B	27	9	1	1	—		—		28	10
Benevento	2020–21	Serie A	17	5	1	0	—		—		18	5
Benevento	Total		106	21	5	2	—		7	0	118	23
Bologna	2021–22	Serie A	6	0	0	0	—		—		6	0
Cagliari	2022–23	Serie B	16	1	2	1	—		3	0	21	2
Cagliari	2023–24	Serie A	26	5	2	1	—		—		28	6
Cagliari	2024–25	Serie A	27	3	1	0	—		—		28	3
Cagliari	Total		69	9	5	2	—		3	0	77	11
Career total			375	54	24	5	—		13	0	412	58
