= Salvatore Tazza =

Italian footballer

Personal information
- Date of birth: 18 January 1998 (age 28)
- Place of birth: Naples, Italy
- Height: 1.84 m (6 ft 0 in)
- Position: Centre-back

Team information
- Current team: Nocerina
- Number: 5

Youth career
- –2017: Benevento
- 2015–2017: → Bologna (loan)

Senior career*
Years	Team	Apps	(Gls)
2017–2020	Benevento	0	(0)
2017	→ Reggina (loan)	2	(0)
2018–2019	→ Paganese (loan)	42	(2)
2019–2020	→ Arzignano (loan)	24	(0)
2020–2021	Cavese	13	(0)
2021	Bisceglie	20	(0)
2021–2022	Team Altamura	27	(0)
2022–2023	Vibonese	30	(2)
2023–2024	Gelbison	28	(0)
2024	USD Palmese	11	(0)
2024–2025	Matera	19	(1)
2025–2026	Nocerina	25	(1)
2026–2027	FC Obermais	1	(0)
- * Club domestic league appearances and goals as of 24 August 2026

Salvatore Tazza (born 18 January 1998) is an Italian footballer who plays as a centre back for Serie D club FC Obermais.

== Club career ==
He made his Serie C debut for Reggina on 7 November 2017 in a game against Siracusa.

On 23 July 2019, he was loaned to Arzignano.

On 17 September 2020 he moved to Cavese on a permanent basis on a 1-year contract with extension option.

On 13 January 2021 he joined Bisceglie.

On 6 November 2021 he signed with Team Altamura in Serie D.
