= History of Benevento Calcio =

History of Italian association football club Benevento Calcio

This page covers the history of Benevento Calcio from 1929 to the present day.

== Origins ==
Football in Benevento was first introduced on September 6, 1929, the date of the founding of the Società Sportiva Littorio Benevento, which played on the Santa Maria degli Angeli (later called Meomartini) field, built by Don Francesco Minocchia with the help of Benevento's resident footballers and located in the Libertà district of the city. The club's colors were light blue. Littorio participated in the Third Regional Division tournament. In the first decade of its existence it won the Third, Second and First Category championships, then in the 1934-1935 season it participated for the first time in the national Serie C championship, having an excellent tournament thanks to the technical guidance of Armand Halmos. Three years later, in the 1938-1939 season, they won the "Targa Capocci" (a tournament in which 22 teams took part), beating Scafatese 5-1 in the final. In the period immediately after the war, the renamed Associazione Calcio Benevento played well in Serie C, where they first won promotion to Serie B in the 1945-1946 season, but had to leave due to financial problems. The Giallorossi continued to finish high in the league in the following seasons, but failed to get promoted.

== From the 1950s to the 1970s ==
In the 1950s, Oronzo Pugliese was a popular figure. He coached the team in 1952. A year later, however, the historic club was forced to close due to its debts, and the bankruptcy of the old team left a free field for the second local club, the amateurs of Sanvito Benevento, who wore the red-and-black colors and seven years later entered Serie C as Società Sportiva Benevento, adopting the red-and-yellow colors.

After playing in the third division in 1960-1961, finishing fourth, the Giallorossi returned to Serie D in 1961-1962, where they stayed for three years. In 1965, Polisportiva Benevento was formed from the merger of the local clubs Sportiva Benevento and Fiamma Sannita, returning to Serie D in 1967.

After seven consecutive championships in Serie D, the club returned to Serie C in 1974 under the presidency of Bocchino, where the Giallorossi immediately finished fourth and went on to compete in thirteen consecutive Serie C championships.

=== 1975-1976 season ===
In the 1975-1976 season, Benevento finished in second place in what would remain the most controversial championship for more than three decades: with Pietro Santin as coach, the team made an excellent second half of the season, recording twelve positive results in a row, the result of eleven victories (nine in a row) and one draw, conquering the top of the standings on the 26th day in a direct home match against Lecce, thus overtaking them. The promotion to Serie B, however, was not achieved, as Pietro Santin's team managed three consecutive draws (first against Caserta and then two at home against Acireale and Messina), which allowed the Salentini to catch Benevento in the standings, and then two defeats on the road (against Bari and Cosenza), which meant the end of the dream. In the same season, Benevento participated in the fifth edition of the Anglo-Italian Cup, a competition between English and Italian clubs held in the spring of 1976: they were eliminated in the group stage. In the following 1976-1977 season, the team finished fourth in Serie C.

=== SSC Benevento and new stadium ===
In the 1978-1979 season, with the restructuring of Serie C, the Società Sportiva Calcio Benevento was born. The following year, the Santa Colomba stadium was inaugurated.

== 1980s ==
Under the chairmanship of the lawyer Ernesto Mazzoni, supported from time to time by local businessmen, SSC Benevento played nine consecutive championships in Serie C1. Of note were the fifth place finish under the technical direction of Gastone Bean (1981-82) and the sixth place finish under coach Francesco Liguori (1983-1984), which earned the Stregoni a participation in the Coppa Italia against teams from Serie A and Serie B. After a first relegation in 1986, followed by a miraculous repechage, Benevento was relegated to Serie C2 in 1987, despite having an excellent squad.

Two risky escapes from the fourth division in 1988 and 1989 (both with Maurizio Simonato as coach) were followed by relegation to the Interregional Championship for failure to pay the guarantee (which was not for the full 400 million required by the FIGC, but only for 320 million). Therefore, Benevento were forced to leave professional football for only 80 million, resulting in an anonymous championship in the Interregional, played with a team composed mostly of Samnite players.

== 1990s ==
The 1990-91 Interregional season saw the birth of Sporting FC Benevento, the name of the new club having been chosen by the fans in a telephone poll during a television broadcast at the time. The president was Mario Peca, who did not keep his promises, but had the merit of stirring up the passion of the Benevento supporters. There was another variation on the club's classic colors when red and silver jerseys were adopted, in homage to the coat of arms of the city of Benevento. The club finished first in Group I, eleven points ahead of the runners-up, but had a bitter epilogue in the play-off for promotion against Juve Stabia (winners of Group L). After the defeat, the club was taken over by a group of Neapolitan businessmen who, after half a year, in the face of total discontent and hostility from the fans, handed it over to the Cotroneo family, who brought back the traditional red and yellow colors.

=== The return to Serie C2 ===
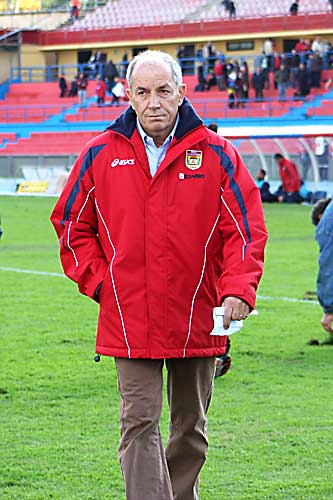
Luigi Boccolini, coach of the team that was promoted to Serie C2 in the 1993-1994 season.

After two transitional seasons that ended in eighth and sixth place, respectively, a top-class team was assembled for the 1993-1994 season that was largely similar to that of the 1990-1991 season, starting with Luigi Boccolini as coach. With a strong attacking duo of Nicola D'Ottavio and Silvio Paolucci, Benevento soon had an easy time against rivals Nocerina. The team won the tournament eight points ahead of second-placed Nocerina and third-placed Toma Maglie, and fourteen points ahead of fourth-placed Taranto, returning to Serie C2 after five seasons.

With the return to the professional league, the roster was strengthened with some additions for the 1994-1995 season. The team did not have a brilliant season, but finished third, tied with Savoia, and qualified for the playoffs for the first time in the club's history. However, Boccolini's team was eliminated by Savoia (2-0 away, 3-3 at home).

The following season, 1995-1996, was particularly troubled, culminating in salvation in the last match: in the playoff against Frosinone, the Stregoni won 1-0, avoiding the playoffs and shattering the promotion dreams of the Ciociari, who were in first place. This was followed by two excellent championships for the club.

In 1996-1997, the Stregoni, coached by Massimo Silva, had a rocket start only to cede the lead in the standings as the days went by to Battipagliese, who won the tournament. In second place, Benevento entered the playoffs as favorites. However, after eliminating Catanzaro in the semi-finals (0-0 away and 2-0 at home), they were defeated in the final in Avellino by Turris, coached by their former coach Esposito (0-2), which remains the "away game" that attracted the largest number of Samnite supporters, up to eight thousand. There was considerable controversy in the city, in particular due to an altercation between sporting director Nicola D'Ottavio and striker Sossio Aruta.

The following season, 1997-1998, the club continued to strengthen its squad. Once again with Silva and then with Pino Raffaele on the bench, in a very balanced championship, Benevento failed to win the league outright and had to try again for promotion through the playoffs. Like the year before, after eliminating Sora (with two 1-0 wins, both goals scored by Francesco Passiatore), the Stregoni succumbed in the final: on the neutral field of Lecce, they were defeated by Crotone 2-1, after finishing the first half ahead. It was the last game of the Cotroneo family, who left the club to Renato Pedicini.

=== The rise to Serie C1 ===
In the 1998-1999 season, after a shaky start, Francesco Dellisanti's team began to play spectacularly, allowing them to climb positions in the standings and finish in fourth place, in the playoff zone. After once again eliminating Catanzaro (2-1 win at home and 1-1 draw in Calabria), Benevento landed in the final for the third consecutive year. On June 13, 1999, at the Via del Mare stadium in Lecce, the team defeated Messina 2-1 in a match in which the Stregoni fell behind by a goal in the second half only to equalize immediately through Salvatore Bertuccelli. Six minutes into extra time, Rosario Compagno's goal secured the team's first ever victory in a professional league and a return to Serie C1 after 12 seasons.

== 2000s ==
Having landed in Serie C1, Benevento would play six consecutive championships there, from the 1999-2000 season to the 2004-2005 season.

In the first two seasons of the decade, the Giallorossi finished in twelfth place, twice avoiding relegation on the final day thanks to two 2-1 home wins (against Arezzo in 1999-2000; against Fidelis Andria in 2000-2001).

In the 2001-2002 season, Benevento finished in 14th place and salvation came only after the play-out against Nocerina (1-0 win in Nocera and 1-0 defeat at home).

After an unremarkable mid-table finish the year before, the Samnites made a long comeback in the 2003-2004 season and reached the playoffs. After beating Crotone 1-0 at home in the semifinals, they lost 3-1 in the return leg.

=== Bankruptcy and return to Serie C2 ===
In the 2004-2005 season, the Samnites were fighting for a playoff spot until two days before the end of the season, finishing in eighth place. However, due to serious tax defaults, president Spatola's club was relegated to Serie C2, marking the end of the Sporting Football Club chapter.

In the summer of 2005, the joint stock company Benevento Calcio was founded, led by a Biella businessman, Older Tescari, who was not welcomed with sympathy due to a modest and inadequate transfer window.

Participating in the 2005-2006 Serie C2 tournament and complying with article 52 of NOIF, in March 2006, with the team in free fall in the standings and out of the playoff zone, Benevento was taken over by brothers Ciro and Oreste Vigorito. The Campanian club managed to finish fourth, but was eliminated in the playoff semi-finals by Sansovino.

For the 2006-2007 Serie C2 season, the team was entrusted to coach Danilo Pileggi, who, after a good start (two consecutive wins), ended up with five draws and two defeats, collecting only eleven points in the first nine days. On the tenth day, Giovanni Simonelli took over. The Samnites managed to catch up with Sorrento and came close to promotion, finishing just one point behind the leaders. In the playoffs, after overcoming Monopoli, Benevento failed to return to Serie C1 against Potenza (they lost 1-0 away and drew 1-1 at home).

=== The return to Serie C1 ===
In the 2007-2008 season, Simonelli's team had an easy time, winning the championship with four rounds to spare, finishing the season nine points clear of second place in the standings and returning to Serie C1. That season, Benevento also reached the final of the Coppa Italia Serie C for the first time in their history, but were decisively defeated by Bassano Virtus (5-0 away defeat and 1-1 draw at home).

Over the following seasons, the club went on an unprecedented spending spree, fielding a first-class team and openly challenging for promotion to Serie B. The Vigorito brothers soon proved to be adept managers, investing heavily not only in the first team, but also in youth development and facilities.

In the 2008-2009 season, the Stregoni fought with Gallipoli until the last day, but the Salento team won by only one point. In the playoffs, the elimination of Foggia in the semi-finals (0-0 and 2-2) seemed to open the doors of promotion for the Samnites, especially due to the 1-1 draw in the first leg of the final against Crotone and the advantage of the Campanians due to the better positioning in the regular season. In the return leg, however, Benevento lost 1-0 at home to the Calabrians.

The 2009-2010 season soon saw Novara overtaking their rivals and Benevento playing with fluctuating performances, also as a result of various technical changes: coach Leonardo Acori was fired and replaced by Andrea Camplone from the seventeenth day, only to be rehired in the thirty-first round, four days before the end of the championship. In the last month, the team scored ten points, enough to overtake Lumezzane and qualify for the playoffs. At the end of the tournament, the Giallorossi were once again denied promotion after being eliminated by Varese (2-2 at home and 2-1 away in Lombardy).

== 2010s ==
=== The ups and downs in Serie C ===
The 2010-2011 season began with the appointment of a new coach, Agatino Cuttone, who, after collecting only four points from as many games, began a run of seven wins and three draws that saw the team finish second in the standings. However, Cuttone's side went into a slump in the last three games of the first half of the season, and he was sacked with the Giallorossi seven points behind leaders Nocerina. Even the new coach, Giuseppe Galderisi, could not turn things around and the championship ended with Benevento in second place, eleven points behind the leaders. As in the past, the Samnites were eliminated in the playoffs: Juve Stabia defeated them 1-0 in the first leg and 1-1 in the return. This period was particularly marked by the death of CEO Ciro Vigorito on October 26, 2010. The naming of the Santa Colomba stadium after the executive was approved by the city council on November 2, just seven days after his death.

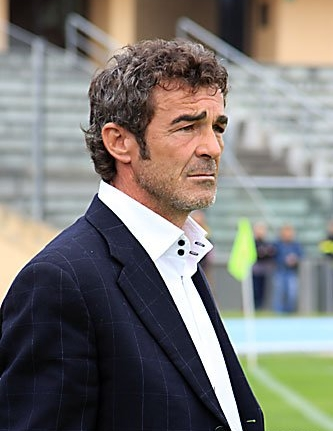
Gaetano Auteri, coach of the team that was promoted to Serie B in the 2015-2016 season.

The 2011-2012 season, in which Benevento started with a points deficit for the first time (six points later reduced to two), began with the return of Simonelli as coach, replaced from the fifteenth day by Carmelo Imbriani and Jorge Martínez as assistant coach. Benevento finished the season in sixth place, losing the chance to participate in the playoffs.

During the pre-season training camp for the 2012-2013 season, coach Imbriani was forced to step down for serious health reasons, leaving the position to his assistant. Jorge Martínez resigned in the face of poor results (three wins and four defeats), and the Uruguayan was replaced by Guido Ugolotti, who was relieved of his duties to make way for Guido Carboni after leading the team into the playoff zone. On the penultimate day of the season, Benevento lost 2-0 to Pisa and once again failed to qualify for the playoffs.

The 2013-2014 season began with Carboni at the helm, aiming to at least qualify for the playoffs for promotion to Serie B. After a slow start to the championship, the coach was sacked on January 20, 2014: losing 0-2 at home to Lecce proved to be fatal. His replacement was Fabio Brini, who led Benevento to the playoffs after the club's seventh-place finish in the league. The Samnites eliminated Catanzaro with a 2-1 away win, but in the semifinals they lost 2-0 at home to Lecce and were eliminated.

The 2014-2015 season began with the confirmation of Brini as the team's coach. Due to numerous injuries that occurred during the championship, Stefano Layeni, Riccardo Allegretti, and Gaetano D'Agostino were added to the roster on October 8, November 13, and December 1, 2014, respectively. The Stregoni finished the season in second place with 76 points, earning the right to participate in the playoffs, where they were eliminated in the quarterfinals with a 2-1 home loss to Como.

=== The double jump from Serie C to Serie A ===
In the 2015-2016 season, Oreste Vigorito was no longer at the helm of the club, which was now led by Fabbrocini-Pallotta, and the Campanian side, led by coach Gaetano Auteri, went on an eighteen-game unbeaten streak, most of which came in the return leg: on the penultimate day, they beat Lecce 3-0 at home to secure their historic promotion to Serie B.

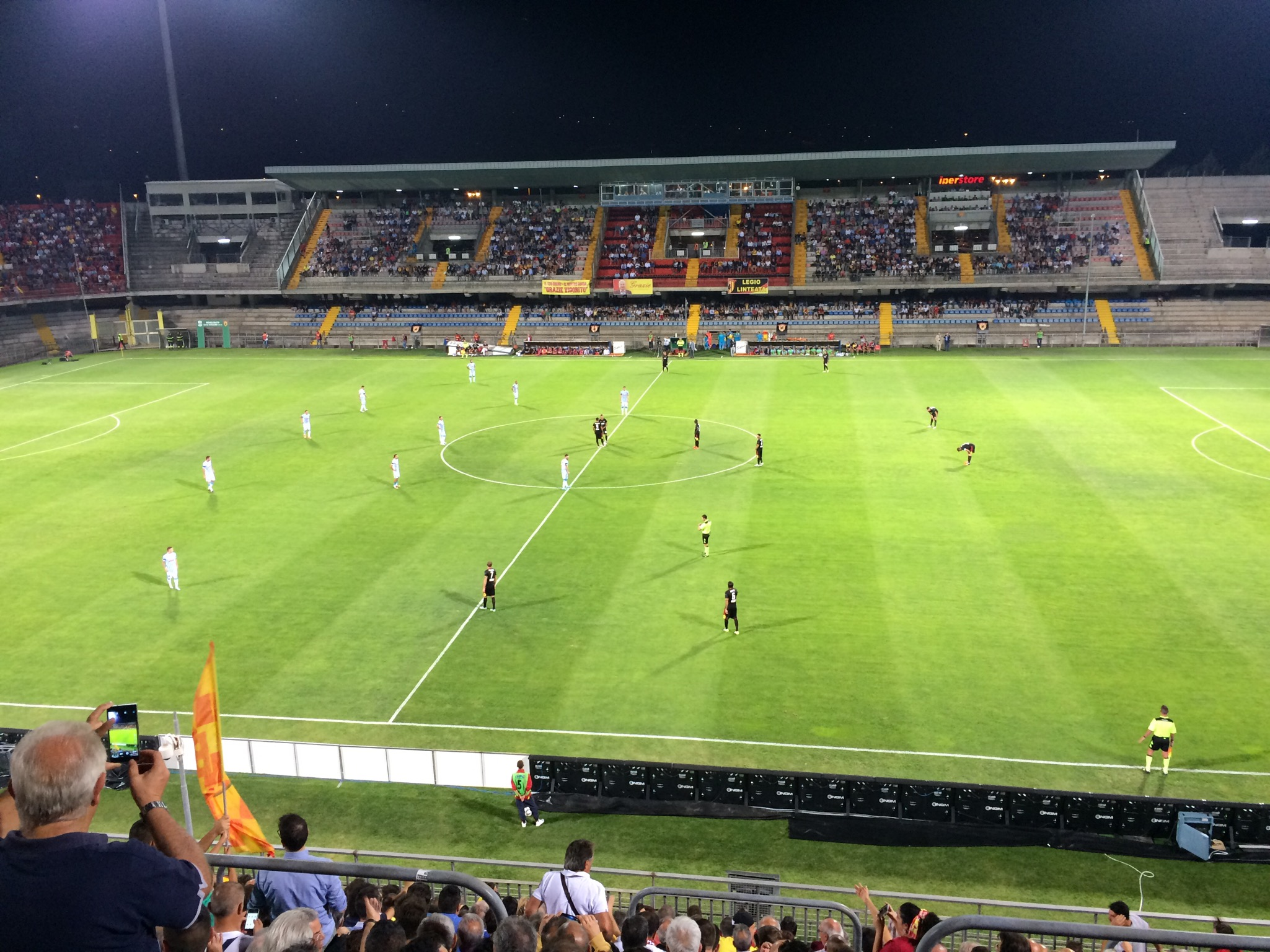
Benevento vs. SPAL on August 27, 2016, the debut of the Samnites in Serie B.

Before the 2016-2017 Serie B season, Vigorito returned to the helm of the club, which received a point deduction for financial administrative issues; in the championship, the Samnites surprisingly finished in fifth place. This position qualified the team for the playoffs, where the Giallorossi eliminated Spezia (preliminary round) and Perugia (semi-final): the final against Carpi, who were seeking an immediate return to the top flight, was decided in favor of the Campanians with a 1-0 aggregate score between the two matches. Benevento thus became the fourth club from Campania to be promoted to Serie A (after Napoli, Salernitana and Avellino) and the first in the history of Italian football to reach the top flight in the year of its debut in Serie B. The architect of this feat was coach Marco Baroni, hired by the club's management in the summer of 2016.

=== 2017-2018: The debut season in Serie A ===
The 2017-2018 Serie A season proved to be very difficult for Benevento: from their debut on August 20 to October 22, the team suffered nine consecutive defeats, Baroni was sacked on October 23, 2017, and replaced by Roberto De Zerbi, who in November worsened the European record held by Manchester United from the 1930-1931 season: fourteen consecutive defeats from the start of the tournament. In December, the Campanians earned their first point in the top flight with a draw against AC Milan, thanks to a goal scored by goalkeeper Alberto Brignoli in the dying minutes of the second half, and then recorded their first win in Serie A with a narrow victory over Chievo at the Vigorito. The second half of the season alternated between numerous defeats and a few victories, while the first away points date back to April, with the Samnites returning to the second division following Crotone's victory over Udinese with four days to play, which at that point in the championship made the fourth-last position unattainable for the Campanians, who the day before, on April 21, 2018, had beaten AC Milan at San Siro.

=== The return to Serie B ===
For the following 2018-2019 Serie B championship, President Vigorito entrusted the team to coach Cristian Bucchi, with Pasquale Foggia confirmed as sporting director. The team finished fourth in the Serie B regular season, which became third due to the automatic relegation of Palermo, and reached the semi-finals of the playoffs. Despite a 2-1 away win in the first leg, the team was eliminated from the playoffs after losing the second leg 3-0 at home to Cittadella.

== 2020s ==
=== Between Serie A and B, the fall to C ===
For the 2019-2020 Serie B season, Bucchi was replaced by Filippo Inzaghi. The team immediately climbed to the top of the Serie B table and stayed there, opening up a very large lead over their rivals and breaking numerous records in the division, before the tournament was suspended due to the COVID-19 pandemic in Italy in 2020. When the season resumed, Benevento won the Wings of Victory Cup and were promoted to Serie A with seven days to spare, matching Ascoli's 1977-1978 record.

The 2020-2021 Serie A championship saw Benevento lead a good first half of the season and finish the first round in 11th place, with 22 points. However, a collapse in the second half of the season, during which the Samnites managed only one win (at the Juventus field), caused the team's relegation to Serie B, which occurred one day before the end of the tournament.

The team was therefore entrusted to Fabio Caserta, who led Benevento to seventh place at the end of a championship full of ups and downs. In the playoffs, the Samnite team eliminated Ascoli, but in the semifinals, after losing the return leg on the field of Pisa (1-0), it had to abandon its hopes of promotion, despite the victory obtained in the first leg (1-0) against the Tuscans, better placed in the table.

In 2022-2023, Caserta's team ran into a series of negative results that led to the dismissal of the Calabrian coach. Three other coaches, Fabio Cannavaro, Roberto Stellone and Andrea Agostinelli, would alternate on the bench of the Samnites, but the performance would remain extremely lackluster, with the team embroiled in the fight not to be relegated. One day before the end of the regular season, despite a new victory after eleven days (at home against Modena), the Campanians were relegated to Serie C.

In the 2023-24 Serie C season, Benevento changed their coach from Matteo Andreoletti to Gaetano Auteri after a crisis of results, and managed to climb to third place in Group C. In the playoffs, they defeated Triestina and Torres, and reached the semifinals against Carrarese, but were eliminated 3-2 on aggregate.

== See also ==
- 2023–24 Benevento Calcio season
