= Enrico Brignola =

Italian footballer (born 1999)

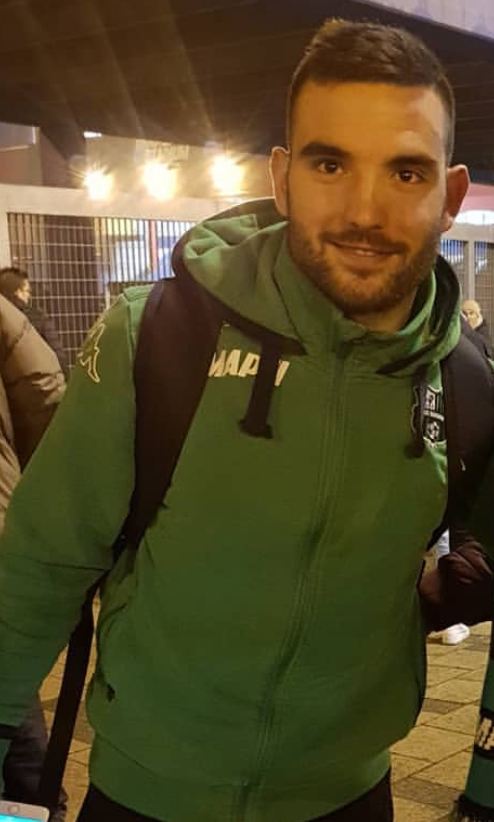

Personal information
- Date of birth: 8 July 1999 (age 27)
- Place of birth: Caserta, Italy
- Height: 1.68 m (5 ft 6 in)
- Position: Winger

Youth career
- –2016: Benevento
- 2015–2016: → Roma (loan)

Senior career*
Years	Team	Apps	(Gls)
2016–2018	Benevento	18	(3)
2018–2022	Sassuolo	7	(1)
2019–2020	→ Livorno (loan)	4	(0)
2020–2021	→ SPAL (loan)	9	(0)
2021	→ Frosinone (loan)	7	(1)
2021–2022	→ Benevento (loan)	22	(0)
2022–2023	Benevento	0	(0)
2022–2023	→ Cosenza (loan)	20	(2)
2023	→ Catanzaro (loan)	15	(2)
2023–2025	Catanzaro	23	(1)
2025–2026	Ternana	10	(0)

International career^{‡}
2014	Italy U15	2	(0)
2018	Italy U19	5	(1)
2018	Italy U20	3	(0)
2018	Italy U21	2	(0)
- * Club domestic league appearances and goals as of 30 April 2026 ‡ National team caps and goals as of 28 July 2018

Enrico Brignola (born 8 July 1999) is an Italian professional footballer who plays as a winger.

== Club career ==
=== Benevento ===
Brignola made his professional debut for Benevento on 17 September 2016, in a Serie B match against Latina. Benevento were promoted at the end of the season as winners of the play-offs.

On 3 December 2017, aged 18, he made his Serie A debut for Benevento in a 2–2 draw against Milan at Stadio Ciro Vigorito.

=== Sassuolo ===
On 2 August 2018, Brignola signed for Serie A club Sassuolo.

==== Livorno ====
On 2 September 2019, Brignola joined Serie B side Livorno on loan until 30 June 2020.

==== SPAL ====
On 25 September 2020 he joined SPAL on loan. On 30 January 2021, Brignola terminated his loan with SPAL and he returned to Sassuolo.

==== Frosinone ====
On 1 February 2021 he was loaned to Serie B club Frosinone.

=== Return to Benevento ===
On 31 August 2021, he returned to Benevento on loan with an obligation to buy.

==== Cosenza ====
On 5 July 2022, Brignola was loaned by Benevento to Cosenza, with an option to buy.

==== Catanzaro ====
On 25 January 2023, Brignola moved on loan to Serie C club Catanzaro. Catanzaro held an obligation to buy his rights in case of their promotion to Serie B. Catanzaro was promoted to Serie B for the 2023–24 season, making the transfer permanent.

== International career ==
On 25 May 2018, Brignola made his debut with the Italy U21 team in a 3–2 friendly defeat to Portugal.

== Career statistics ==
=== Club ===
Updated as of 11 June 2019.

Club	League	Season	League		Cup		Europe		Other		Total	
Club	League	Season	Apps	Goals	Apps	Goals	Apps	Goals	Apps	Goals	Apps	Goals
Benevento	Serie B	2016–17	1	0	0	0	–		–		1	0
Benevento	Serie A	2017–18	18	3	1	0	–		–		19	3
Benevento	Total		19	3	1	0	–		–		20	3
Sassuolo	Serie A	2018–19	7	1	1	0	–		–		8	1
Career total			26	4	2	0	–		–		28	4

== Honours ==
=== International ===
- UEFA European Under-19 Championship runner-up: 2018
