= Alessio Donnarumma =

Italian football player (born 1998)

Personal information
- Date of birth: 16 February 1998 (age 28)
- Place of birth: Vico Equense, Italy
- Height: 1.82 m (6 ft 0 in)
- Position: Midfielder

Youth career
- –2012: Benevento
- 2012–2016: Inter
- 2016–2018: Benevento

Senior career*
Years	Team	Apps	(Gls)
2016–2020	Benevento	0	(0)
2018–2019	→ Vibonese (loan)	8	(0)
2019–2020	→ Picerno (loan)	3	(0)
2020–2022	Nocerina	55	(1)
2022–2023	Legnano	35	(1)
2023	FAVL Cimini		
2023–2024	Gallipoli	21	(0)
2024–2025	Costa d’Amalfi FC	13	(1)
2025	Angri	13	(0)

International career
2014	Italy U16	4	(0)
- * Club domestic league appearances and goals as of 3 October 2025

Alessio Donnarumma (born 16 February 1998) is an Italian footballer who plays as a midfielder.

== Club career ==
He started his youth career with Benevento, before switching to Inter in 2012. In 2016 he returned to Benevento.

He made sporadic bench appearances for Benevento's senior squad in 2016–17 Serie B and 2017–18 Serie A, but did not see any field time.

On 9 July 2018 he joined Serie C club Vibonese on a season-long loan. He made his Serie C debut for Vibonese on 16 September 2018 in a game against Bisceglie as a starter and was substituted at half-time.

On 15 July 2019, he joined Picerno in Serie C on loan.

== International career ==
In 2014, during his time with Inter, he was called up for several friendlies to the Italy national under-16 football team.
