= Roberto Insigne =

Italian footballer (born 1994)

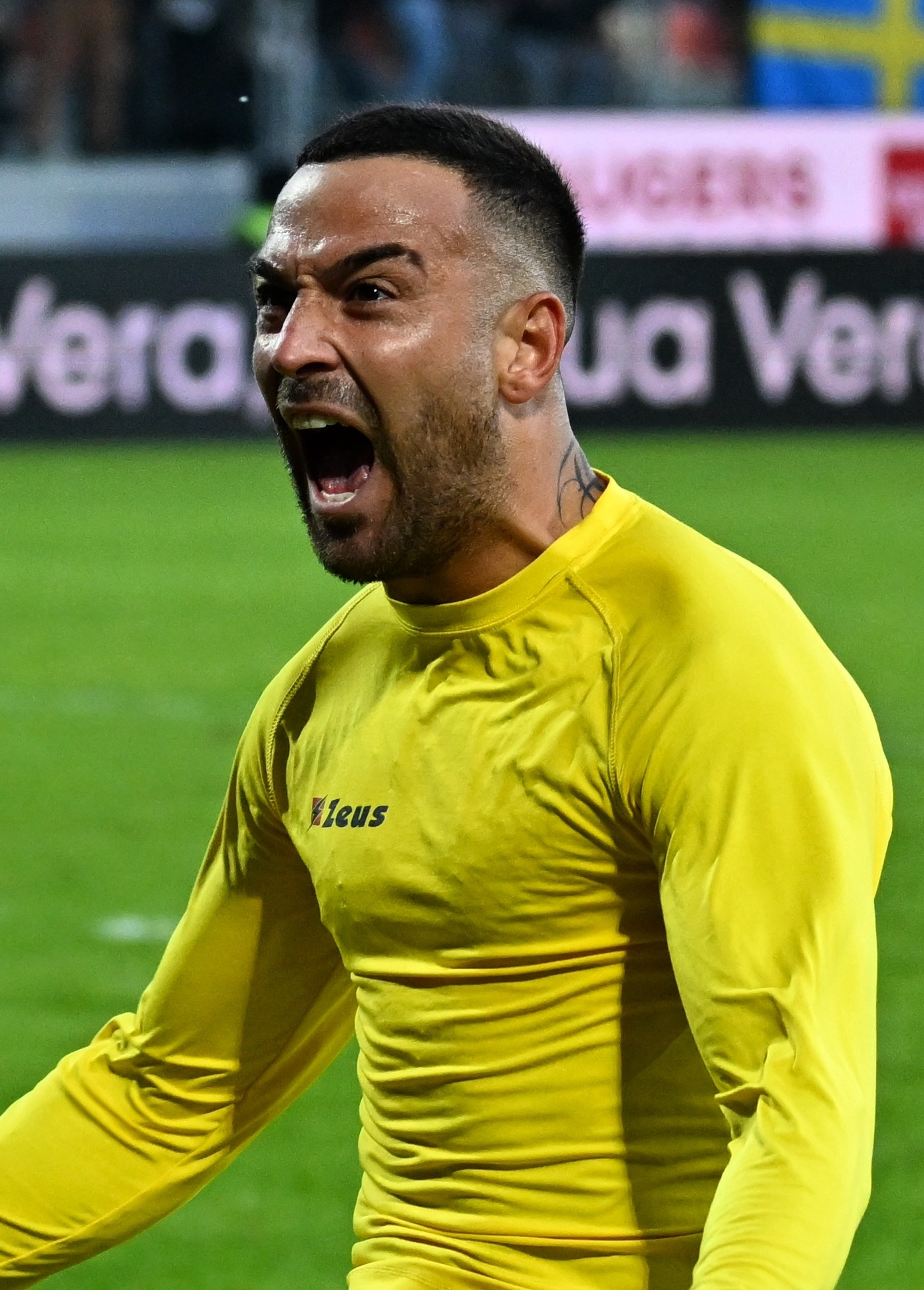
- Insigne in 2022

Personal information
- Date of birth: 11 May 1994 (age 32)
- Place of birth: Frattamaggiore, Naples, Italy
- Height: 1.72 m (5 ft 8 in)
- Position: Forward

Team information
- Current team: Catania

Youth career
- 2011–2012: Napoli

Senior career*
Years	Team	Apps	(Gls)
2012–2019	Napoli	6	(0)
2013–2014	→ Perugia (loan)	12	(1)
2014–2015	→ Reggina (loan)	32	(9)
2015–2016	→ Avellino (loan)	33	(5)
2017	→ Latina (loan)	19	(1)
2017–2018	→ Parma (loan)	31	(5)
2018–2019	→ Benevento (loan)	25	(7)
2019–2022	Benevento	97	(17)
2022–2023	Frosinone	31	(8)
2023–2025	Palermo	49	(6)
2025–2026	Avellino	21	(1)
2026–	Catania	0	(0)

International career^{‡}
2011	Italy U18	1	(0)
2012–2013	Italy U19	9	(0)
2013	Italy U21	3	(2)
- * Club domestic league appearances and goals as of 29 August 2026 ‡ National team caps and goals as of 1 June 2013

Roberto Insigne (born 11 May 1994) is an Italian professional footballer who plays as a forward for Serie C Group C club Catania.

== Club career ==
=== Napoli ===
Insigne initially chose the shirt number 42 at Napoli, as his older brother and Napoli teammate Lorenzo wore the number 24, but later chose the number 30, and finally the number 94, as it represented the year of his birth. After playing for the Napoli Primavera side in the club's youth system, he made his professional debut for the club's senior side under manager Walter Mazzarri in the Europa League on 6 December 2012, in a 2–0 home defeat against PSV Eindhoven; his first appearance in Serie A came on 13 January 2013, as he appeared as a very late substitute in a 3–0 home win against Palermo, playing alongside his older brother.

On 22 July 2013 he was sent on loan from Napoli to Perugia, at the request of the club's coach, and former Napoli striker, Cristiano Lucarelli.

In August 2014, he was sent on loan from Napoli to Reggina.

On 15 July 2015, both Insigne and his young Napoli attacking teammate Gennaro Tutino were sent on loan to Avellino with an option to buy.

On 12 January 2017, Insigne was sent on loan from Napoli to Serie B side Latina, where he was assigned the number 9 shirt.

On 23 July 2017, it was announced that Insigne would be loaned to newly promoted Serie B side Parma for the 2017–18 season.

=== Benevento ===
On 21 July 2018, Insigne joined with Serie B side Benevento on loan until 30 June 2019. On 23 June 2019, Insigne signed permanently with Benevento. On 29 June 2020, Insigne helped Benevento secure promotion to the Serie A with seven matches to spare. At the time, Benevento had won 23 of their 31 league games and lost just once, and had a 24-point advantage over nearest rivals Crotone and Cittadella.

On 25 October 2020, Insigne scored in Benenvento's clash with his former club Napoli; Insigne's brother Lorenzo was also on the scoresheet as Napoli won 2–1. It was Insigne's first goal ever in the top division of Italian football. It was also only the second time in Serie A history that two brothers have scored against each other in a game; Hungarian pair István and Ferenc Nyers did the same back in 1949, while playing for Inter Milan and Lazio respectively.

=== Later years: Frosinone, Palermo and Avellino ===
On 27 August 2022, Insigne signed a two-year contract with Frosinone.

On 12 July 2023, Insigne signed for Serie B club Palermo on a three-year deal. After two lacklustre seasons, on 24 July 2025 Insigne left Palermo to sign for newly-promoted Serie B club Avellino.

== International career ==
At international level, Insigne has represented the Italy U-18, U-19, and U-21 sides.

== Style of play ==
Insigne is a left-footed forward known for his pace, technique, and creativity. He is capable of playing across the front line and has been used in roles such as a second striker, winger, and attacking midfielder. He often operates in a free role, allowing him to both create and score goals. He is frequently deployed as a right winger, where he can cut inside onto his stronger left foot to shoot. He has also occasionally been used as a central striker.

== Personal life ==
Roberto is the younger brother of footballer Lorenzo Insigne, who plays for Pescara. His oldest and youngest brothers, Antonio and Marco, also play football, in the Italian amateur divisions. Roberto Insigne is married to Elisabetta; their daughter, Patrizia, was born on 22 November 2016.

== Career statistics ==
=== Club ===
As of match played 13 May 2023

Appearances and goals by club, season and competition
Club	Season	League			Coppa Italia		Europe		Total	
Club	Season	Division	Apps	Goals	Apps	Goals	Apps	Goals	Apps	Goals
Napoli	2012–13	Serie A	5	0	—		1 (Note: Appearance in UEFA Europa League)	0	6	0
Napoli	2013–14	Serie A	—		—		0	0	0	0
Napoli	2016–17	Serie A	1	0	—		0	0	1	0
Napoli	Total		6	0	0	0	1	0	7	0
Perugia (loan)	2013–14	Lega Pro	14	2	0	0	—		14	2
Reggina (loan)	2014–15	Lega Pro	32	9	0	0	—		32	9
Avellino (loan)	2015–16	Serie B	33	5	1	0	—		34	5
Latina (loan)	2016–17	Serie B	19	1	0	0	—		19	1
Parma (loan)	2017–18	Serie B	31	5	1	0	—		32	5
Benevento (loan)	2018–19	Serie B	27	8	3	2	—		30	10
Benevento	2019–20	Serie B	35	8	1	0	—		36	8
Benevento	2020–21	Serie A	30	2	1	0	—		31	2
Benevento	2021–22	Serie B	33	7	2	0	—		35	7
Benevento	2022–23	Serie B	1	0	0	0	—		1	0
Benevento	Total		126	25	7	2	0	0	133	27
Frosinone	2022–23	Serie B	30	8	—		—		30	8
Career total			291	55	9	2	1	0	302	57

== Honours ==
Perugia

- Lega Pro: 2013–14

Benevento

- Serie B: 2019–20

Frosinone

- Serie B: 2022–23
