= Alberto Brignoli =

Italian footballer (born 1991)

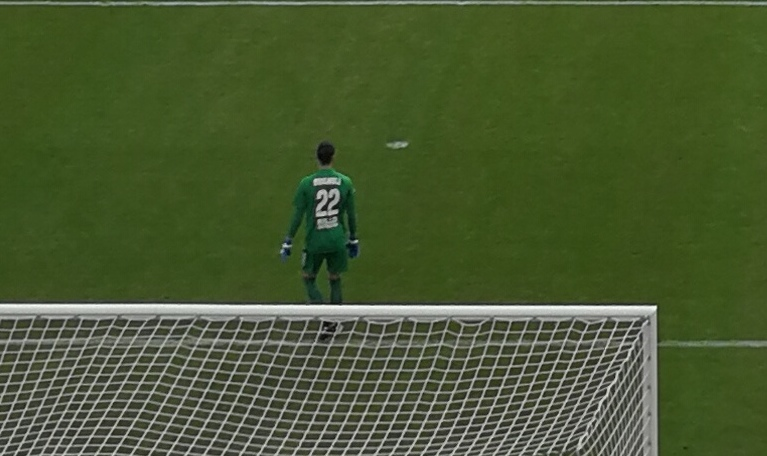
- Brignoli at Benevento in 2017, in the match against AC Milan on 3 December in which he scored the 2–2 final goal

Personal information
- Full name: Alberto Brignoli
- Date of birth: 19 August 1991 (age 35)
- Place of birth: Trescore Balneario, Italy
- Height: 1.88 m (6 ft 2 in)
- Position: Goalkeeper

Team information
- Current team: AEK Athens
- Number: 91

Youth career
- 2001–2007: Sarnico
- 2007–2008: Grumellese
- 2008–2009: Montichiari

Senior career*
Years	Team	Apps	(Gls)
2009–2011	Montichiari	62	(0)
2011–2013	Lumezzane	31	(0)
2012–2013	→ Ternana (loan)	9	(0)
2013–2015	Ternana	78	(0)
2015–2018	Juventus	0	(0)
2015	→ Ternana (loan)	15	(0)
2015–2016	→ Sampdoria (loan)	1	(0)
2016–2017	→ Leganés (loan)	1	(0)
2017	→ Perugia (loan)	20	(0)
2017–2018	→ Benevento (loan)	13	(1)
2018–2019	Palermo	31	(0)
2019–2021	Empoli	71	(0)
2021–2024	Panathinaikos	69	(0)
2024–	AEK Athens	13	(0)
- * Club domestic league appearances and goals as of 21:00, 20 September 2025 (UTC)

Alberto Brignoli (born 19 August 1991) is an Italian professional footballer who plays as a goalkeeper for Greek Super League club AEK Athens.

== Career ==
=== Early career ===
Born in Trescore Balneario, Brignoli was loaned to Ternana Calcio for 2012–13 season. He made his professional debut on 1 September 2012, starting in a 0–1 home loss against Modena for the Serie B championship.

On 31 January 2013, Ternana signed Brignoli outright from Lumezzane. He continued to appear regularly for the club, achieving mid table positions in all campaigns.

=== Juventus ===
On 2 February 2015, Juventus signed Brignoli outright for €1.75 million, which saw the remaining 50% registration rights of Alberto Masi move in the opposite direction for €1.5 million. Brignoli returned to Terni immediately on loan for the rest of the season.

=== Sampdoria ===
On 2 July 2015, Brignoli was signed by Sampdoria in a temporary deal. He made his Serie A debut on 14 May 2016 (round 38 the last round), playing the full 90 minutes in a 0–5 away loss against his parent club.

=== CD Leganés ===
On 20 July 2016, Brignoli was loaned to La Liga club CD Leganés, for one year.

=== Perugia ===
On 11 January 2017, Brignoli returned to Italy, joining Perugia on loan.

=== Benevento ===
On 30 July 2017, Brignoli joined Serie A newcomers Benevento on a temporary deal, with an obligation to buy at the end of season. According to Corriere dello Sport – Stadio, the obligation would depend on Benevento securing a place in the 2018–19 Serie A season. He was assigned number 22 shirt. On 3 December, he scored a 95th-minute equaliser with a header in a 2–2 home draw against Milan, to earn Benevento their first ever point in Serie A after a record 14 consecutive defeats. With the goal, Brignoli was the third goalkeeper to score from open play in Serie A history after Michelangelo Rampulla in 1992 and Massimo Taibi in 2001.

=== Palermo ===
On 25 July 2018, Brignoli signed with Serie B club Palermo until 30 June 2021.

=== Empoli ===
On 18 July 2019, Brignoli signed for Serie B club Empoli for free. On 20 September 2021, Alberto Brignoli became the best goalkeeper in last year's Serie B as he helped his team, Empoli, rise to Serie A. "It was a great pleasure and honor to receive the award for best goalkeeper for last season. I want to thank my teammates, my coaches and the staff who gave me the opportunity to catch this performance."

=== Panathinaikos ===
On 31 August 2021, Brignoli joined Greek club Panathinaikos on a free transfer.

On 13 January 2024, Panathinaikos announced that Brignoli would depart the club upon the expiry of his contract in the forthcoming summer.

=== AEK Athens ===
On 2 July 2024, Brignoli joined Greek club AEK Athens on a free transfer.

== Career statistics ==
As of match played 8 September 2026

Club	Season	League			National cup (Note: Includes Coppa Italia, Copa del Rey, Greek Football Cup)		Continental		Total	
Club	Season	Division	Apps	Goals	Apps	Goals	Apps	Goals	Apps	Goals
Montichiari	2009–10	Serie D	32	0	0	0	—		32	0
Montichiari	2010–11	Serie D	30	0	0	0	—		30	0
Montichiari	Total		62	0	0	0	—		62	0
Lumezzane	2011–12	Serie C	31	0	0	0	—		31	0
Ternana	2012–13	Serie B	28	0	1	0	—		29	0
Ternana	2013–14	Serie B	36	0	1	0	—		37	0
Ternana	2014–15	Serie B	38	0	2	0	—		40	0
Ternana	Total		102	0	4	0	—		106	0
Sampdoria (loan)	2015–16	Serie A	1	0	0	0	0	0	1	0
Leganés (loan)	2016–17	La Liga	1	0	1	0	—		2	0
Perugia (loan)	2016–17	Serie B	20	0	0	0	—		20	0
Benevento (loan)	2017–18	Serie A	13	1	0	0	—		13	1
Palermo	2018–19	Serie B	31	0	2	0	—		33	0
Empoli	2019–20	Serie B	38	0	2	0	—		40	0
Empoli	2020–21	Serie B	33	0	0	0	—		33	0
Empoli	Total		71	0	2	0	—		73	0
Panathinaikos	2021–22	Super League Greece	25	0	4	0	—		29	0
Panathinaikos	2022–23	Super League Greece	34	0	0	0	2 (Note: Appearances in UEFA Europa Conference League)	0	36	0
Panathinaikos	2023–24	Super League Greece	10	0	0	0	11 (Note: Six appearances in UEFA Champions League, five appearances in UEFA Europa League)	0	21	0
Panathinaikos	Total		69	0	4	0	13	0	86	0
AEK Athens	2024–25	Super League Greece	9	0	4	0	0 (Note: Appearances in UEFA Conference League)	0	13	0
AEK Athens	2025–26	Super League Greece	2	0	5	0	0 (Note: Appearances in UEFA Conference League)	0	7	0
AEK Athens	2026–27	Super League Greece	0	0	1	0	1 (Note: Appearances in UEFA Champions League)	0	2	0
AEK Athens	Total		11	0	10	0	1	0	22	0
Career total			412	1	23	0	14	0	429	1

== Honours ==
=== Club ===
Empoli

- Serie B: 2020–21

Panathinaikos

- Greek Cup: 2021–22

AEK Athens

- Super League Greece: 2025–26

=== Individual ===
- Panathinaikos Player of the Season: 2022–23
- Super League Greece Goalkeeper of the Season: 2022–23
- Super League Greece Team of the Season: 2022–23
