= Abdallah Basit =

Ghanaian footballer (born 1999)

Personal information
- Date of birth: 15 October 1999 (age 27)
- Place of birth: Ghana
- Height: 1.80 m (5 ft 11 in)
- Position: Midfielder

Youth career
- 2016–2018: Carpi
- 2016–2018: → Napoli (loan)

Senior career*
Years	Team	Apps	(Gls)
2018–2019	Arezzo	24	(1)
2019–2023	Benevento	5	(0)
2021	→ Pescara (loan)	0	(0)
2022	→ Monterosi (loan)	8	(0)
- * Club domestic league appearances and goals as of 19 May 2023

Abdallah Basit (born 15 October 1999) is a Ghanaian footballer who plays as a midfielder.

== Club career ==
Basit played at Carpi and Napoli on youth level, before he signed to third-tier club Arezzo on the summer of 2018. He made his professional debut in the first round of 2018–19 season on 16 September 2018 against Lucchese, playing 90 minutes.

On 2 September 2019, he signed a 3-year contract with the Serie B side Benevento. Following Benevento's promotion to Serie A for the 2020–21 season, he did not make any appearances for the squad in the top tier in the first half of the season, despite being on the bench for most games. On 1 February 2021, he was loaned to Pescara.

On 20 January 2022, he went to Monterosi on loan.

== Sources ==
- Abdallah Basit at TuttoCalciatori.net (in Italian)
