= Pier Graziano Gori =

Italian footballer

Personal information
- Date of birth: 10 May 1980 (age 46)
- Place of birth: Taranto, Italy
- Height: 1.89 m (6 ft 2 in)
- Position: Goalkeeper

Team information
- Current team: Benevento (GK coach)

Senior career*
Years	Team	Apps	(Gls)
1997–2001	Taranto	48	(0)
2001–2003	Ancona	6	(0)
2003–2004	Fermana	0	(0)
2004–2005	Como	29	(0)
2005–2006	Taranto	13	(0)
2006–2010	Benevento	115	(0)
2010–2012	Nocerina	47	(0)
2012–2014	Benevento	54	(0)
2014–2015	Salernitana	51	(0)
2015–2017	Benevento	38	(0)
2017–2018	Venezia	0	(0)
2018–2021	Benevento	2	(0)

Managerial career
- 2021–: Benevento (GK coach)
- * Club domestic league appearances and goals

Pier Graziano Gori (born 10 May 1980) is an Italian football coach and a former player who played as a goalkeeper. He is the goalkeeping coach for Benevento.
