= Luca Antei =

Italian footballer

Personal information
- Date of birth: 19 April 1992 (age 34)
- Place of birth: Rome, Italy
- Height: 1.88 m (6 ft 2 in)
- Position: Centre back

Youth career
- Roma

Senior career*
Years	Team	Apps	(Gls)
2011–2013	Roma	0	(0)
2011–2012	→ Grosseto (loan)	21	(1)
2013–2018	Sassuolo	52	(1)
2017–2018	→ Benevento (loan)	8	(0)
2018–2021	Benevento	32	(0)
2020–2021	→ Pescara (loan)	2	(0)

International career
2011	Italy U19	1	(0)
2013	Italy U20	2	(2)
2011–2015	Italy U21	11	(0)
- * Club domestic league appearances and goals as of 23 January 2021

Luca Antei (born 19 April 1992) is an Italian footballer who plays as a defender.

== Club career ==
=== Roma ===
He began his career with Serie A club Roma. Ahead of the 2011–12 season, Antei was training with the club's first-team and he was praised by Walter Sabatini, Roma's director of football, who said he was "growing exponentially" as a player. Serie B side Grosseto announced that they had signed Antei on loan at the end of the transfer window in August 2011. The club also had an option to sign him outright. Having won the Campionato Nazionale Primavera the previous season, the club allowed him to leave temporarily to gain experience. He made his debut for Grosseto on 1 October in a 3–3 draw with Ascoli, replacing Samuele Olivi as a substitute. On 1 June 2012 he had an operation on his knee (anterior cruciate ligament). In June 2012 Roma paid Grosseto €100,000 as counter-option.

=== Sassuolo ===
In January 2013 Antei was signed by U.S. Sassuolo Calcio, initially in a temporary deal, with an option to sign 50% registration rights. On 1 July 2013 Sassuolo signed Antei in a co-ownership deal for €500,000. The last 50% registration rights of Antei was purchased on 25 June 2015. for another €500,000.

=== Benevento ===
On 31 August 2017, Antei joined Benevento on a season-long loan deal with obligation to buy.

On 5 October 2020, he joined Pescara on loan. On 27 January 2021, the loan was terminated.

== International career ==
He received his first call-up to the Italy under-21 team, managed by Ciro Ferrara, in August 2011 for the 2013 UEFA European Under-21 Football Championship qualifier against Hungary in September. He made his debut the following month in a 7–2 win against Liechtenstein on 6 October.

== Style of play ==
Luca Antei started his career as a midfielder, until Alberto de Rossi, who at that time was coaching Roma Youth team, adapted him as a central defender. Thanks to his body structure and his tactical skill, Antei is good at areal play.
