= Giuseppe Di Serio =

Italian footballer

Personal information
- Date of birth: 20 July 2001 (age 25)
- Place of birth: Trento, Italy
- Height: 1.82 m (6 ft 0 in)
- Position: Forward

Team information
- Current team: Spezia
- Number: 20

Youth career
- –2016: Südtirol
- 2016–2017: Hellas Taranto
- 2017–2019: Benevento

Senior career*
Years	Team	Apps	(Gls)
2019–2022	Benevento	32	(3)
2022	→ Pordenone (loan)	13	(2)
2022–2023	Perugia	27	(5)
2023–2024	Atalanta U23	21	(4)
2024	→ Spezia (loan)	10	(3)
2024–	Spezia	56	(4)

International career^{‡}
2021	Italy U20	5	(0)
- * Club domestic league appearances and goals as of 13 May 2026 ‡ National team caps and goals as of 15 November 2021

Giuseppe Di Serio (born 20 July 2001) is an Italian football player who plays for Serie C Group B club Spezia.

== Club career ==
On 20 August 2019, he signed his first professional contract, a 2-year deal with Serie B club Benevento, after playing for their junior squad for the previous two seasons.

He made his Serie B debut for Benevento on 15 February 2020 in a game against Pordenone. He substituted Roberto Insigne in the 89th minute.

On 19 January 2022, he joined Pordenone on loan until the end of the 2021–22 season.

On 21 July 2022, Di Serio signed a three-year contract with Perugia.

On 1 September 2023, Di Serio was signed by Atalanta for their reserve team Atalanta U23.

On 1 February 2024, Di Serio was loaned by Spezia, with an obligation to buy.

== International career ==
He made his first appearance for his country in September 2021 for a Under-20 team friendly against Serbia.

== Career statistics ==
As of match played 12 April 2021

Appearances and goals by club, season and competition
Club	Season	League			National Cup		Continental		Total	
Club	Season	Division	Apps	Goals	Apps	Goals	Apps	Goals	Apps	Goals
Benevento	2019–20	Serie B	8	1	0	0	–		8	1
Benevento	2020–21	Serie A	13	0	1	0	–		14	0
Benevento	Total		21	1	1	0	0	0	22	1
Career total			21	1	1	0	0	0	22	1
