= Lorenzo Del Pinto =

Italian footballer

Personal information
- Date of birth: 17 June 1990 (age 36)
- Place of birth: L'Aquila, Italy
- Height: 1.80 m (5 ft 11 in)
- Position: Defender

Team information
- Current team: L'Aquila

Senior career*
Years	Team	Apps	(Gls)
2007–2008	Atessa Val di Sangro	4	(0)
2008–2009	Pescara	0	(0)
2009–2010	Fano	11	(1)
2010–2011	Renato Curi Angolana	30	(3)
2011–2013	Chieti	67	(4)
2013–2015	L'Aquila	60	(8)
2015–2021	Benevento	111	(3)
2021–2022	Reggiana	18	(0)
2022–2023	Potenza	31	(1)
2023–	L'Aquila	0	(0)
- * Club domestic league appearances and goals as of 23 April 2023

Lorenzo Del Pinto (born 17 June 1990) is an Italian footballer who plays for Serie D club L'Aquila.

== Club career ==
On 14 January 2021, he signed a 1.5-year contract with Serie B side Reggiana.
