= Gaetano Letizia =

Italian footballer

Personal information
- Date of birth: 29 June 1990 (age 36)
- Place of birth: Naples, Italy
- Height: 1.73 m (5 ft 8 in)
- Position: Right-back

Team information
- Current team: Pescara
- Number: 3

Senior career*
| Years | Team | Apps | (Gls) |
| 2007–2008 | San Vitaliano | | |
| 2008–2010 | Pianura | 61 | (1) |
| 2010–2012 | Aversa Normanna | 64 | (1) |
| 2012–2017 | Carpi | 174 | (5) |
| 2017–2024 | Benevento | 174 | (7) |
| 2023–2024 | → Feralpisalò (loan) | 23 | (0) |
| 2024–2025 | Feralpisalò | 7 | (0) |
| 2025 | → Pescara (loan) | 9 | (0) |
| 2025– | Pescara | 32 | (1) |
- * Club domestic league appearances and goals as of 13 May 2026

Gaetano Letizia (born 29 June 1990) is an Italian professional footballer who plays as a right-back for Serie C Group B club Pescara.

== Club career ==
Born in Naples, Letizia made his senior debut with Pianura in Serie D. In the summer of 2010 he joined Aversa Normanna.

On 27 July 2012, Letizia moved to Carpi in a co-ownership deal. On 24 August 2013 he made his Serie B debut, starting in a 0–1 defeat against Ternana; Letizia scored his first goal on 26 December, netting his side's second of a 3–1 win at Virtus Lanciano.

On 7 July 2017, he moved to newly promoted Benevento on a three-year contract.

On 1 September 2023, Letizia moved on loan to Feralpisalò.

On 29 August 2024, Letizia's contract with Benevento was terminated by mutual consent.

On 3 October 2024, Letizia returned to Feralpisalò on a two-season contract.

On 9 January 2025, Letizia was loaned by Pescara until the end of the season, with Pescara holding an obligation to make the transfer permanent in case of their promotion to Serie B. Pescara was promoted, making the transfer permanent.
