= Bright Gyamfi =

Ghanaian footballer

Personal information
- Date of birth: 20 January 1996 (age 30)
- Place of birth: Accra, Ghana
- Height: 1.78 m (5 ft 10 in)
- Position: Right-back

Team information
- Current team: Casarano
- Number: 29

Youth career
- 2009–2016: Inter Milan

Senior career*
| Years | Team | Apps | (Gls) |
| 2015–2017 | Inter Milan | 0 | (0) |
| 2016–2017 | → Benevento (loan) | 23 | (0) |
| 2017–2020 | Benevento | 22 | (0) |
| 2020–2021 | Reggiana | 25 | (0) |
| 2022 | Benevento | 4 | (0) |
| 2022–2024 | Potenza | 44 | (1) |
| 2024–2025 | Cosenza | 11 | (0) |
| 2025 | Messina | 13 | (1) |
| 2025– | Casarano | 27 | (1) |
- * Club domestic league appearances and goals as of 1 May 2026

Bright Gyamfi (born 20 January 1996) is a Ghanaian professional footballer who plays as a right-back for Serie C Group C club Casarano.

== Club career ==
On 19 January 2022, he returned to Benevento.

On 18 January 2024, Gyamfi signed a contract with Serie B side Cosenza until 30 June 2024, with an option to renew.
