= Giovanni Volpicelli =

Italian footballer

Personal information
- Date of birth: 24 September 1999 (age 27)
- Place of birth: Naples, Italy
- Height: 1.75 m (5 ft 9 in)
- Position: Midfielder

Team information
- Current team: Afragolese
- Number: 73

Youth career
- 2014–2015: Aversa
- 2015–2016: Napoli
- 2016–2018: Benevento

Senior career*
| Years | Team | Apps | (Gls) |
| 2018–2021 | Benevento | 1 | (0) |
| 2019–2020 | → Arezzo (loan) | 10 | (0) |
| 2020–2021 | → Juve Stabia (loan) | 0 | (0) |
| 2021 | → Paganese (loan) | 9 | (0) |
| 2021–2022 | Paganese | 15 | (0) |
| 2022– | Afragolese | 1 | (0) |
- * Club domestic league appearances and goals as of 18 September 2022

Giovanni Volpicelli (born 24 September 1999) is an Italian professional footballer who plays as a midfielder for 3°Categoria Campana club Zeta Napoli

== Club career ==
On 19 June 2017, Volpicelli joined the youth academy of Benevento after spells in the academies of Aversa and Napoli. Volpicelli made his professional debut for Benevento in a 3–0 Serie A win over Hellas Verona on 4 April 2018.

On 29 July 2019, he joined Serie C club Arezzo on loan.

On 5 October 2020, he moved on loan to Juve Stabia.

On 28 January 2021 he was loaned to Paganese.

On 3 August 2021 returned to Paganese on a permanent basis.
