= Luca Sparandeo =

Italian footballer

Personal information
- Date of birth: 18 August 1999 (age 27)
- Place of birth: Benevento, Italy
- Height: 1.80 m (5 ft 11 in)
- Position: Leftback

Team information
- Current team: Nocerina

Youth career
- 2011–2018: Benevento

Senior career*
| Years | Team | Apps | (Gls) |
| 2018–2021 | Benevento | 2 | (0) |
| 2019 | → Viterbese Castrense (loan) | 9 | (0) |
| 2019–2021 | → Virtus Francavilla (loan) | 44 | (4) |
| 2021–2022 | Lecco | 7 | (0) |
| 2022–2023 | Vibonese | 27 | (1) |
| 2023–2024 | Trapani | 7 | (1) |
| 2024– | Nocerina | 0 | (0) |
- * Club domestic league appearances and goals as of 5 May 2024

Luca Sparandeo (born 18 August 1999) is an Italian professional footballer who plays as a leftback for Serie D club Nocerina.

== Club career ==
Sparandeo joined the Benevento youth academy in 2011. He made his professional debut for Benevento in a 0–2 Serie A loss to SPAL on 6 May 2018.

On 31 January 2019, he joined Serie C club Viterbese Castrense on loan.

On 20 July 2019, he joined Serie C club Virtus Francavilla on loan. The loan was renewed for the 2020–21 season on 12 September 2020.

On 25 August 2021, he joined Lecco on permanent basis.

For the 2022–23 season, Sparandeo signed with Vibonese in Serie D.
