= Stadio Ciro Vigorito =

Football stadium in Benevento, Italy

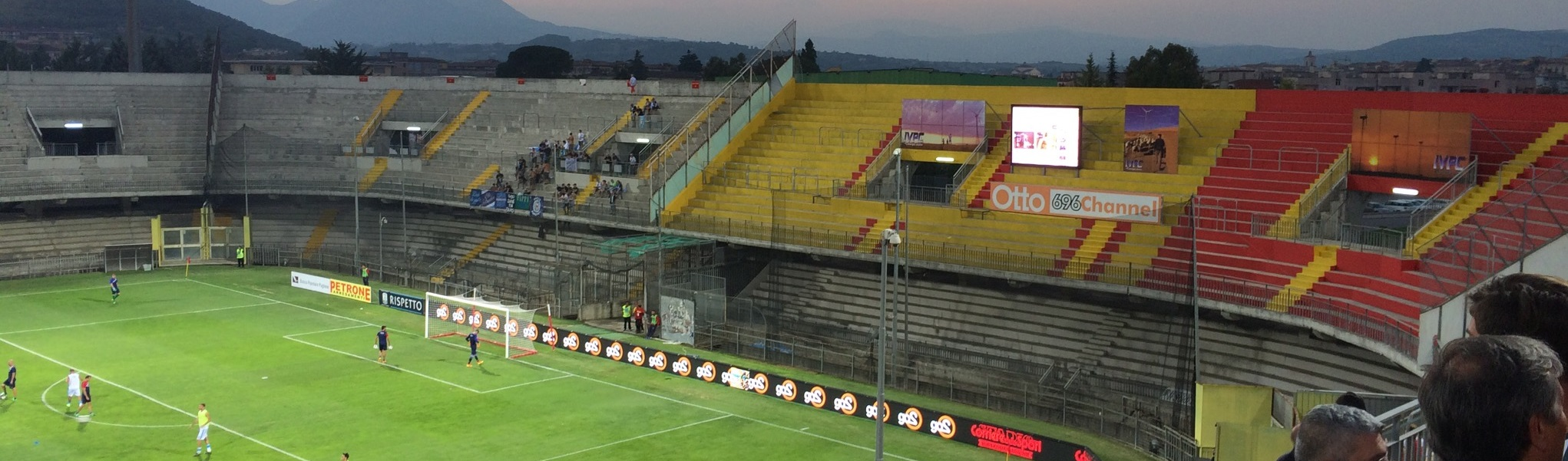
- Interactive map of Stadio Ciro Vigorito
- Former names: Stadio Santa Colomba
- Location: Benevento, Italy
- Coordinates: 41°6′59″N 14°46′52″E
- Owner: Comune of Benevento
- Capacity: 25,000 (can be limited to 16,867 for safety reasons)

Construction
- Groundbreaking: 1976
- Opened: 1979
- Project manager: Costantino Rozzi

Tenants
- Benevento Calcio; Italy national football team (selected matches)

Stadio Ciro Vigorito (formerly Stadio Santa Colomba) is a multi-use stadium in Benevento, Italy. It is currently used mostly for football matches and is the home stadium of Benevento Calcio. The stadium is able to hold 25,000 people and was opened in 1979.

The stadium was named after Ciro Vigorito, a sports executive, journalist and Italian entrepreneur working in the renewable energy sector.
