= Aymeric Laporte =

Spain international footballer (born 1994)

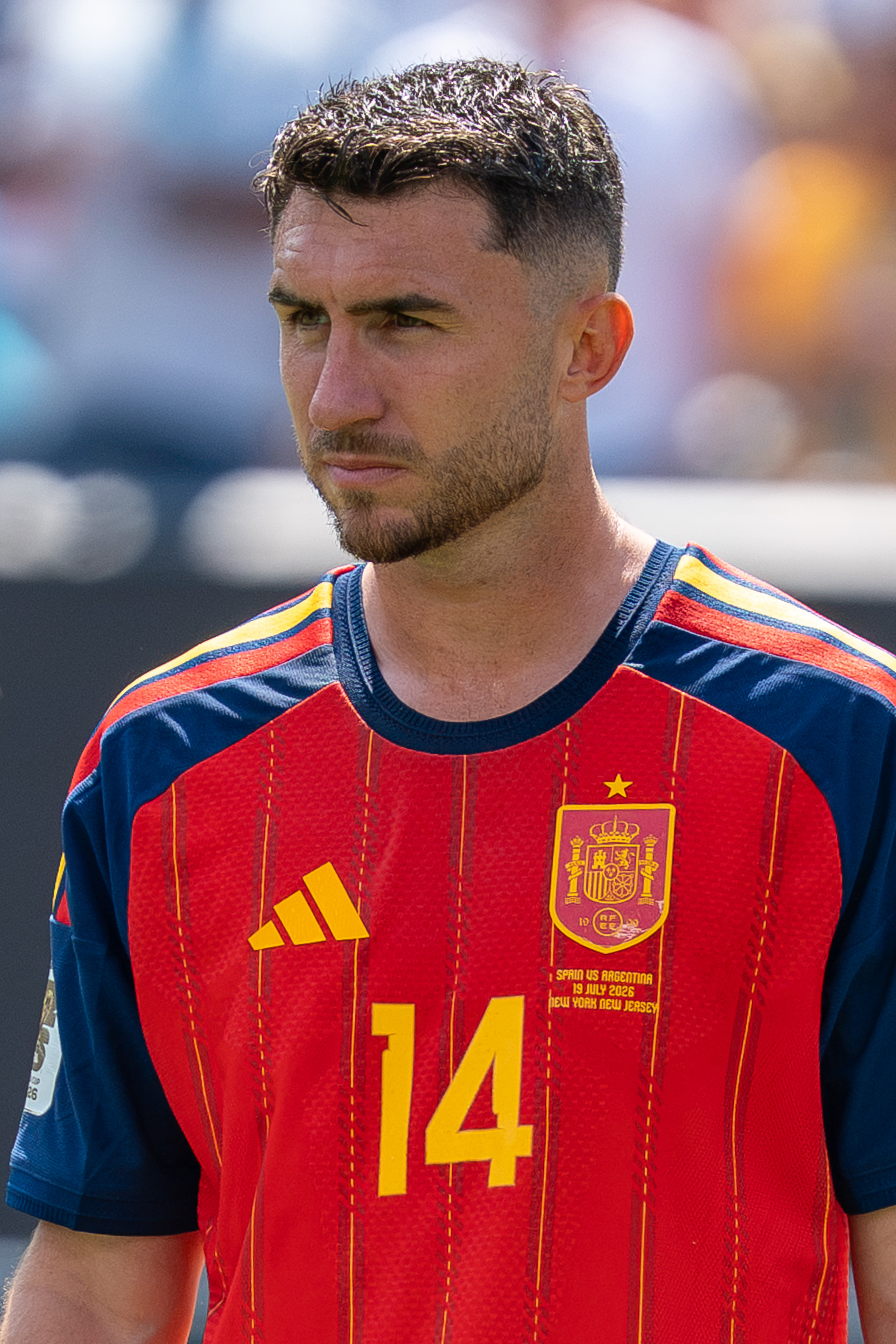
- Laporte with Spain in 2026

Personal information
- Full name: Aymeric Jean Louis Gérard Alphonse Laporte
- Date of birth: 27 May 1994 (age 32)
- Place of birth: Agen, France
- Height: 1.91 m (6 ft 3 in)
- Position: Centre-back

Team information
- Current team: Athletic Bilbao
- Number: 14

Youth career
- 2000–2009: SU Agen
- 2009–2010: Bayonne
- 2010–2011: Athletic Bilbao

Senior career*
Years	Team	Apps	(Gls)
2011–2012	Basconia	33	(2)
2012–2013	Athletic Bilbao B	8	(0)
2012–2018	Athletic Bilbao	161	(7)
2018–2023	Manchester City	121	(8)
2023–2025	Al-Nassr	47	(8)
2025–	Athletic Bilbao	36	(0)

International career^{‡}
2011–2012	France U17	11	(1)
2011–2012	France U18	9	(0)
2012–2013	France U19	12	(1)
2013–2016	France U21	19	(1)
2021–	Spain	58	(2)
Medal record
Men's football
Representing Spain
FIFA World Cup
Winner	2026 Canada–Mexico–US
UEFA European Championship
Winner	2024 Germany
Bronze medal – third place	2020 Europe
UEFA Nations League
Winner	2023 Netherlands
Runner-up	2021 Italy
- * Club domestic league appearances and goals as of 19:03, 20 November 2026 (UTC) ‡ National team caps and goals as of 22:05, 15 November 2026 (UTC)

Aymeric Jean Louis Gérard Alphonse Laporte (Note: French pronunciation: [ɛməʁik lapɔʁt]) (born 27 May 1994) is a professional footballer who plays as a centre-back for La Liga club Athletic Bilbao. Born in France, he plays for the Spain national team.

When he joined Athletic Bilbao in 2010 at the age of 16, he became only the second player born in France—after Bixente Lizarazu—to play for them, going on to make 222 competitive appearances for the club. In January 2018, he signed for Manchester City. He was part of the side which won the only domestic treble in English men's football in 2019, and the country's second-ever continental treble in 2023. He moved to Saudi club Al-Nassr in 2023 and spent two seasons there before returning to Athletic Bilbao in September 2025.

Laporte won 51 caps for France at youth international levels, and was called up to the senior team twice but remained uncapped. In 2021, after receiving Spanish citizenship, Laporte was named in Spain's squad for UEFA Euro 2020. He would then go on to represent the nation at the 2022 FIFA World Cup, Euro 2024 and the 2026 World Cup, winning both the 2024 and the 2026 tournaments.

== Early life ==
Aymeric Jean Louis Gérard Alphonse Laporte was born on 27 May 1994 in Agen, Lot-et-Garonne, France, and is of Basque descent through his great-grandparents. He started playing football and rugby at the age of five, and began his development at Agen's football academy. In 2009, he was invited to join Athletic Bilbao after being scouted. By arrangement with the club, he spent a season with Bayonne as he was legally too young to play football in another country at the time.

== Club career ==
=== Athletic Bilbao ===
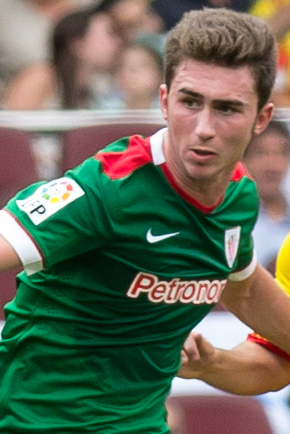
Laporte playing for Athletic Bilbao in 2014

Laporte arrived in Bilbao formally in 2010, joining Athletic's youth setup at Lezama, prompting debate locally over whether his signing met the criteria of their policy due to his tenuous links to the Basque region. He went on to play for the club's farm and reserve teams. On 28 November 2012 he was given his debut with the main squad by manager Marcelo Bielsa, playing the full 90 minutes in a 2–0 away win against Hapoel Ironi Kiryat Shmona in that season's UEFA Europa League.

Laporte made his first La Liga appearance on 9 December 2012, playing one minute in a 1–0 home win over Celta Vigo. He was named in the starting line-up the following week, helping Bilbao to defeat Mallorca by the same scoreline, and was definitely promoted to the first team shortly after, signing a new contract until 2015. On 14 January 2013, he was given the number four shirt previously worn by Ustaritz, and late in the month he renewed his contract, running until 2016 and with a €27.5 million release clause.

Laporte became a regular starter under new coach Ernesto Valverde, also being deployed at left-back on occasion. He scored his first goal as a professional on 28 October 2013, netting the game's only goal at Getafe. At the end of 2013–14 league season, he was voted into the La Liga Team of the Year by the reporters of the Liga de Fútbol Profesional.

In June 2015, Laporte extended his link until 2019 with a release clause of €50 million. After losing the 2015 Copa del Rey Final to Barcelona, he played both legs of the 2015 Supercopa de España triumph against the same opposition, Athletic's first silverware for 31 years.

On 13 June 2016, Laporte renewed his contract until 2020, with his buyout clause rising to an initial €65 million.

=== Manchester City ===
Near the end of the winter transfer window of January 2018, Laporte signed for Manchester City for a reported fee of £57 million (his contractual release clause amount and a record-breaking figure for both clubs). He was given the number 14 shirt, while Athletic immediately spent around half of the fee on Iñigo Martínez as a replacement. Just one day after signing, Laporte made his Manchester City and Premier League debut against West Bromwich Albion. City came out victorious winning 3–0 as they kept up their title charge. He went on to make 13 appearances throughout the season for City, helping them accumulate an unprecedented 100 points in a Premier League season. He made a total of nine league appearances meaning he was eligible for a winner's medal.

Laporte scored his first goal for City on 25 August 2018, equalising against Wolverhampton Wanderers in a 1–1 away draw. He made 51 appearances during the 2018–19 season as the club completed the first domestic treble in English football history (Premier League, FA Cup, League Cup, plus the Community Shield). He scored five goals throughout the season, including an important goal on the final day of the Premier League campaign as City romped to victory over Brighton & Hove Albion securing back-to-back league titles and the second of Laporte's career. Overall he played a total of 4,352 minutes. On 31 August 2019, Laporte sustained an injury to his right knee, causing him to be carried off on a stretcher. He underwent surgery in September 2019.

Laporte had been a regular starter for Manchester City after his return from injury during the 2019–20 season and through the start of the 2020–21 season until a poor display in a 2–0 defeat to Tottenham Hotspur on 21 November 2020. John Stones replaced Laporte in the centre of defence and formed a formidable partnership with new signing Rúben Dias in Laporte's absence from the starting line-up. On 25 April 2021, Laporte headed in the only goal of the game as City beat Tottenham to win their fourth straight EFL Cup.

=== Al-Nassr ===
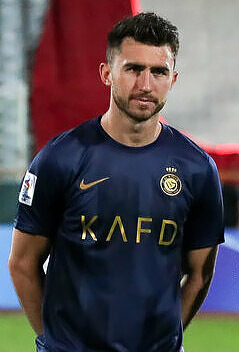
Laporte with Al-Nassr in 2023

On 24 August 2023, Laporte left Manchester City and joined Saudi Pro League club Al-Nassr for a fee of £23.6 million. He made 69 appearances for the Riyadh-based club over two seasons, including the 2024 Saudi Super Cup final, but missed the 2024 King Cup final.

=== Return to Athletic Bilbao ===
In the summer of 2025, Laporte's former club Athletic Bilbao (short of defenders with the doping suspension of Yeray Alvarez and a long-term injury to understudy Unai Egiluz) were reported as having agreed personal terms for a return to Spain, with Al-Nassr signing Iñigo Martínez as a replacement in an echo of the events of 2018 – Martínez was included in the squad for the 2025 Saudi Super Cup while Laporte did not travel to Hong Kong for the tournament. However, complications over the nature of the transaction (Laporte was said to be negotiating a release from the final year of his contract and also declined offers with higher transfer fees from other interested parties due to his desire to return to his first club and his wife's hometown, which was not well received by the Al-Nassr hierarchy) caused the process to be delayed from the Saudi end; no deal was concluded prior to the closure of the Spanish transfer window on 1 September and FIFA initially declined to grant an exceptional International Transfer Certificate. On 11 September, it was confirmed that the ITC had been granted on appeal and Laporte rejoined Athletic on a three-year contract for a reported €10 million fee.

== International career ==
=== France ===
Laporte represented France at under-17, under-18, under-19 and under-21 levels, captaining each side. He was part of the team that came runners-up to Serbia in the 2013 UEFA European Under-19 Championship in Lithuania, and was selected in the Team of the Tournament.

On 24 March 2016, in a 2017 European Under-21 Championship qualifier against Scotland in Angers, Laporte was stretchered off with a fracture and dislocation to his right fibula and ankle, concluding his season prematurely. Previously, in October 2015, he stated that he would consider representing Spain if not selected by France for UEFA Euro 2016. In August 2016, at the behest of new national manager Julen Lopetegui, Laporte began the process of making himself eligible for Spain. A month later, he was called up to the senior France squad by Didier Deschamps for 2018 World Cup qualifiers against Bulgaria and the Netherlands in October, and stated he had decided not to apply for Spanish nationality with the continued aim of playing for France. He did not take part in either match.

In August 2019, he was called up for France's UEFA Euro 2020 qualifying fixtures against Albania and Andorra. However, two days later he was injured playing for his club and ruled out of any involvement.

=== Spain ===
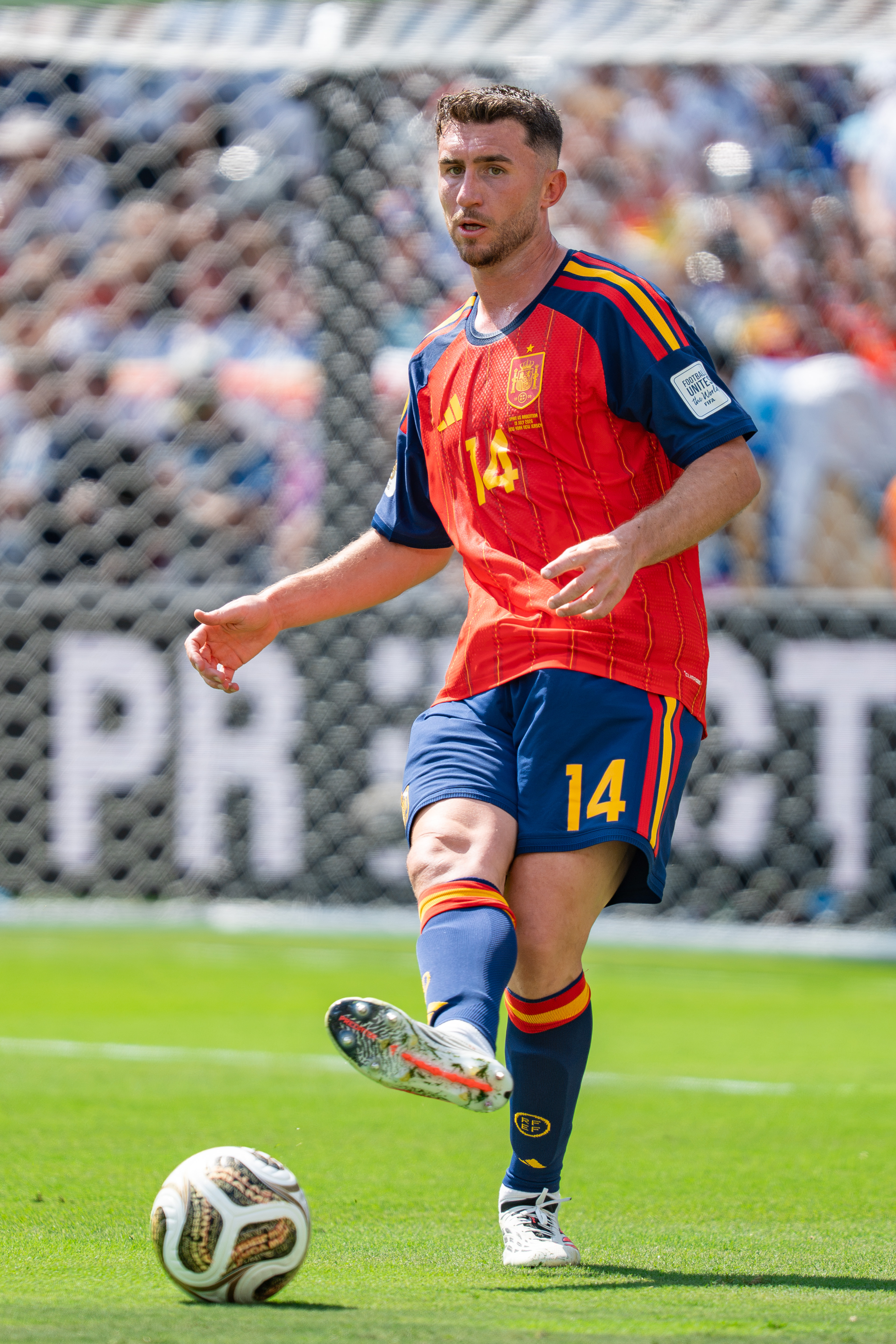
Laporte with Spain against Argentina at the 2026 World Cup final

In May 2021, the Spanish Council of Ministers granted Spanish nationality to Laporte following a process initiated on his behalf by the Royal Spanish Football Federation (RFEF); it was later reported that a phone call to the player from national coach Luis Enrique encouraging him to join the squad had been a decisive factor in completing the process (Laporte had previously claimed in late 2018 that "playing for Spain is out of the question" and that he would not apply for dual citizenship). FIFA approved the change of association later that week, allowing him to play for Spain at the upcoming UEFA Euro 2020 tournament.

On 24 May 2021, Laporte was included in Spain's 24-man squad for Euro 2020. On 4 June, he made his Spain debut when he started in a friendly goalless draw with Portugal. He scored his debut goal for the national team on 23 June, in the group stage 5–0 routing of Slovakia. Spain lost to eventual winners Italy via a penalty shootout at the semi-final stage.

He was selected for the 2022 FIFA World Cup squad and made three appearances in the tournament as Spain were again eliminated on penalties, this time by Morocco in the Round of 16.

On 14 July 2024, Laporte helped Spain win their fourth European title at UEFA Euro 2024, playing in every knockout game as a starter. At the semi-final stage they defeated France, in which Laporte's defensive partner was Robin Le Normand, also a French native with a similar path of naturalisation following a long period playing in Spain for a Basque club (Real Sociedad in his case).

On 25 May 2026, Laporte was named in Spain's squad for the 2026 FIFA World Cup. He started all eight of the matches as they progressed to, and won, the final, conceding only one goal along the way and again eliminating France.

== Style of play ==
Laporte usually plays as a left-sided centre-back. Spanish football journalist Guillem Balagué described Laporte as a "centre-back who can play from the back and is strong", adding that "he is certainly a powerful defender". He is also known for his passing ability.

== Personal life ==
He is the second son of Lionel and Marie-José Laporte, both from Agen. His father worked in a supermarket while his mother was a hairdresser. His younger brother Léo Laporte is also a professional footballer. His paternal grandfather Pierre was a rugby player, while his maternal grandfather Jacques played tennis at a local level.

He is married to professional dancer and former Bilbao Basket cheerleader Sara Botello. She was born in Bilbao with Galician roots. They were married in June 2023 and have two daughters, born in 2021 and 2024.

== Career statistics ==
=== Club ===
As of match played 20 November 2026

Appearances and goals by club, season and competition
Club	Season	League			National cup (Note: Includes Copa del Rey, FA Cup, King's Cup)		League cup (Note: Includes EFL Cup)		Continental		Other		Total	
Club	Season	Division	Apps	Goals	Apps	Goals	Apps	Goals	Apps	Goals	Apps	Goals	Apps	Goals
Basconia	2011–12	Tercera División	33	2	—		—		—		—		33	2
Athletic Bilbao B	2012–13	Segunda División B	8	0	—		—		—		0	0	8	0
Athletic Bilbao	2012–13	La Liga	15	0	0	0	—		2 (Note: Appearances in UEFA Europa League)	0	—		17	0
Athletic Bilbao	2013–14	La Liga	35	2	3	0	—		—		—		38	2
Athletic Bilbao	2014–15	La Liga	33	0	7	0	—		9 (Note: Seven appearances in UEFA Champions League, two appearances in UEFA Europa League)	0	—		49	0
Athletic Bilbao	2015–16	La Liga	26	3	5	2	—		12	0	2 (Note: Appearances in Supercopa de España)	0	45	5
Athletic Bilbao	2016–17	La Liga	33	2	4	0	—		6	0	—		43	2
Athletic Bilbao	2017–18	La Liga	19	0	1	0	—		10	1	—		30	1
Athletic Bilbao	Total		161	7	20	2	—		39	1	2	0	222	10
Manchester City	2017–18	Premier League	9	0	1	0	0	0	3 (Note: Appearances in UEFA Champions League)	0	—		13	0
Manchester City	2018–19	Premier League	35	3	4	0	1	0	10	2	1 (Note: Appearance in FA Community Shield)	0	51	5
Manchester City	2019–20	Premier League	15	1	2	0	0	0	3	0	0	0	20	1
Manchester City	2020–21	Premier League	16	0	4	0	3	2	4	0	—		27	2
Manchester City	2021–22	Premier League	33	4	2	0	0	0	9	0	0	0	44	4
Manchester City	2022–23	Premier League	12	0	5	0	3	0	4	0	0	0	24	0
Manchester City	2023–24	Premier League	1	0	—		—		—		0	0	1	0
Manchester City	Total		121	8	18	0	7	2	33	2	1	0	180	12
Al-Nassr	2023–24	Saudi Pro League	27	4	4	0	—		7 (Note: Appearances in AFC Champions League)	0	1 (Note: Appearance(s) in Saudi Super Cup)	0	39	4
Al-Nassr	2024–25	Saudi Pro League	20	4	2	0	—		6	1	2	0	30	5
Al-Nassr	Total		47	8	6	0	—		13	1	3	0	69	9
Athletic Bilbao	2025–26	La Liga	25	0	3	0	—		2	0	0	0	30	0
Athletic Bilbao	2026–27	La Liga	11	0	0	0	—		—		—		11	0
Athletic Bilbao	Total		36	0	3	0	—		2	0	0	0	41	0
Career total			406	25	47	2	7	2	87	4	6	0	553	33

=== International ===
As of match played 15 November 2026

Appearances and goals by national team and year
National team	Year	Apps	Goals
Spain	2021	14	1
Spain	2022	5	0
Spain	2023	7	0
Spain	2024	14	1
Spain	2025	3	0
Spain	2026	15	0
Total		58	2

As of match played 26 September 2026
Scores and results list Spain's goal tally first, score column indicates score after each Laporte goal.

List of international goals scored by Aymeric Laporte
No.	Date	Venue	Cap	Opponent	Score	Result	Competition	Ref.
1	23 June 2021	La Cartuja, Seville, Spain	4	Slovakia	2–0	5–0	UEFA Euro 2020	
2	15 October 2024	Estadio Nuevo Arcángel, Córdoba, Spain	39	Serbia	1–0	3–0	2024–25 UEFA Nations League A	

== Honours ==
Athletic Bilbao

- Supercopa de España: 2015

Manchester City

- Premier League: 2017–18, 2018–19, 2020–21, 2021–22, 2022–23
- FA Cup: 2018–19, 2022–23
- EFL Cup: 2017–18, 2018–19, 2020–21
- FA Community Shield: 2018
- UEFA Champions League: 2022–23
- UEFA Super Cup: 2023

Spain

- FIFA World Cup: 2026
- UEFA European Championship: 2024
- UEFA Nations League: 2022–23

Individual

- UEFA European Under-19 Championship Team of the Tournament: 2013
- La Liga Team of the Year: 2013–14
- PFA Team of the Year: 2018–19 Premier League

== See also ==
- List of Spain international footballers born outside Spain
