= 2018–19 Manchester City F.C. season =

English football club season

Manchester City
2018–19 season
- Owner: City Football Group
- Chairman: Khaldoon Al Mubarak
- Manager: Pep Guardiola
- Stadium: Etihad Stadium
- Premier League: 1st
- FA Cup: Winners
- EFL Cup: Winners
- FA Community Shield: Winners
- UEFA Champions League: Quarter-finals
- Top goalscorer: League: Sergio Agüero (21); All: Sergio Agüero (32)
- Highest home attendance: 54,511 v Liverpool (3 January 2019, Premier League)
- Lowest home attendance: 32,089 v Burton Albion (9 January 2019, EFL Cup)
- Average home league attendance: 54,108
- Biggest win: 9–0 v Burton Albion (9 January 2019, EFL Cup)
- Biggest defeat: 0–2 v Chelsea (8 December 2018, Premier League)
Home colours	Away colours	Third colours

The 2018–19 season was Manchester City's 117th season of competitive football, 90th season in the top flight of English football and 22nd season in the Premier League. In addition to the league, the club competed in the UEFA Champions League, FA Cup, EFL Cup, and FA Community Shield; for the Champions League, it was their eighth consecutive season competing in the tournament. The season covered the period from 1 July 2018 to 30 June 2019.

During this season, City completed a domestic treble. Apart from winning all three of the major English football tournaments, they also won the Community Shield, the first time any team has ever held all four of England's primary football trophies at the same time. The season was the first since 2009–10 without Yaya Touré, who departed to Olympiacos, and the first since 2005–06 without Joe Hart, who joined Burnley after two seasons of loans.

== Kits ==
Supplier: Nike / Sponsor: Etihad Airways (Front) / Nexen Tire (Sleeves)

Home	Home alt.	Away	Away alt.	Third	Third alt.

== Season summary ==
In the 2018–19 season, Manchester City maintained their free scoring form under manager Pep Guardiola and became the first club in Europe's top leagues to pass 100 goals scored on 20 January 2019 when Danilo scored the first goal in City's 3–0 victory at Huddersfield Town.

City went on to break their own record for a top flight English club for goals scored in all competitions in a season. Leroy Sané's goal in City's 2–0 win at Old Trafford against Manchester United on 24 April 2019 overtook the previous record tally of 156, which was established by Manuel Pellegrini's City side back in their title-winning 2013–14 season. By the end of the 2018–19 season, the team reached 169 goals scored.

Line-ups for the 2019 EFL Cup final between Chelsea and Manchester City

On 24 February, City won their sixth League Cup title when they defeated Chelsea 4–3 on penalties after a goalless draw over 120 minutes at Wembley Stadium.

Expectations were high for City's UEFA Champions League campaign. The team again won their group without breaking a sweat, then routed Schalke 04 in the round of 16, winning their home match 7–0. Similar to the previous season, City were drawn against an English club in the quarter-finals, this time Tottenham Hotspur. The Blues dropped their away match 0–1, with Sergio Agüero missing a penalty. The home match was all-or-nothing for City and it proved to be one of the best matches of that season. Raheem Sterling scored in the beginning, but City quickly conceded two goals and now needed to score three to advance. The squad did exactly that, leading 4–2 with 20 minutes to play. However, Fernando Llorente's contentious goal for Spurs meant City again needed a goal. In added time, Sterling converted a pass from Agüero and the entire stadium started celebrating what seemed to be a certain victory. However, the goal was disallowed after a VAR review and the Blues were eliminated in a heartbreaking fashion.

The 2018–19 Premier League title race was one of the closest contests of the Premier League era. City and Liverpool exchanged their leads 32 times over the season, in part due to fixture rearrangements for EFL and FA Cup matches and television demands. The two title contenders jointly amassed a combined total of 195 points, which at the time was the highest combined total in English top flight history.

On 12 May, City won their final league match of the league season 4–1 away at Brighton & Hove Albion to retain the Premier League title. In doing so, they matched their own record for 32 wins over a single season. They had to win their final 14 consecutive league matches to hold off the challenge of Liverpool, who themselves ended their season with nine-straight wins.

One week later, on 18 May, City defeated Watford 6–0 at Wembley to win the FA Cup and complete an unprecedented English men's domestic treble and clean sweep of the major honors in English football. It was also City's first ever league and FA Cup double and their sixth overall FA Cup title. The 6–0 scoreline was also the joint largest winning margin in the history of the FA Cup Final and the largest for any final in the competition since 1903. This final win of the season was Manchester City's 50th in all competitions.

As of 9 April 2019, Manchester City had won the Carabao Cup, progressed to the final of the FA Cup, were in second place with one game in hand in the Premier League and scheduled to play Tottenham in the Champions League quarter-finals, thus making it possible to achieve the quadruple, a unique sweep of four major tournaments in a single season, something that had not been done by any English men's side. A win in each of City’s last twelve games of the season (potential UCL semi-finals and final included) would have guaranteed the quadruple for the club. However, a dramatic loss to Tottenham on away goals on 17 April ended City's quadruple hopes. Still, the Blues managed to achieve an unprecedented domestic treble.

== Pre-season and friendlies ==
Win Draw Loss

Manchester City began their 2018–19 campaign with a tour of the United States in the 2018 International Champions Cup. City played against Borussia Dortmund at Soldier Field in Chicago, Liverpool at MetLife Stadium in East Rutherford, New Jersey, and Bayern Munich at Hard Rock Stadium in Miami Gardens, Florida.

=== International Champions Cup ===
20 July 2018 2018 ICC	Manchester City	0–1	Borussia Dortmund	Chicago, United States
20:00 CDT		Report	Götze 28' (pen.); Burnić (yellow card) 31'; Dahoud (yellow card) 52'	Stadium: Soldier Field; Attendance: 34,629; Referee: Armando Villarreal (United States)

25 July 2018 2018 ICC	Manchester City	1–2	Liverpool	East Rutherford, United States
20:00 EDT	Sané 57'; Gomes (yellow card) 85'	Report	Van Dijk (yellow card) 30'; Salah 63'; Mané 90+4' (pen.)	Stadium: MetLife Stadium; Attendance: 52,635; Referee: Sorin Stoica (United States)

28 July 2018 2018 ICC	Bayern Munich	2–3	Manchester City	Miami Gardens, United States
19:00 EDT	Shabani 15'; Robben 24'	Report	B. Silva (yellow card) 40', (goal) 45+1', 70'; Nmecha 51'	Stadium: Hard Rock Stadium; Attendance: 29,195; Referee: Ted Unkel (United States)

== Competitions ==
Win Draw Loss

=== Overview ===
Competition	Record							
Competition	Pld	W	D	L	GF	GA	GD	Win %
Premier League	38	32	2	4	95	23	+72	84.21
FA Cup	6	6	0	0	26	3	+23	100.00
EFL Cup	6	4	2	0	16	1	+15	66.67
FA Community Shield	1	1	0	0	2	0	+2	100.00
UEFA Champions League	10	7	1	2	30	12	+18	70.00
Total	61	50	5	6	169	39	+130	81.97

Source: Competitions

=== FA Community Shield ===
As champions of the 2017–18 Premier League, Manchester City took on the 2017–18 FA Cup winners, Chelsea, for the season-opening FA Community Shield.

5 August 2018 Final	Chelsea	0–2	Manchester City	London
15:00 BST		Report	Agüero 13', 58'	Stadium: Wembley Stadium; Attendance: 72,724; Referee: Jonathan Moss

=== Premier League ===
Manchester City entered the competition as the defending champions.

==== League table ====
Pos	Team	Pld	W	D	L	GF	GA	GD	Pts	Qualification or relegation
1	Manchester City (C)	38	32	2	4	95	23	+72	98	Qualification to Champions League group stage
2	Liverpool	38	30	7	1	89	22	+67	97	Qualification to Champions League group stage
3	Chelsea	38	21	9	8	63	39	+24	72	Qualification to Champions League group stage
4	Tottenham Hotspur	38	23	2	13	67	39	+28	71	Qualification to Champions League group stage
5	Arsenal	38	21	7	10	73	51	+22	70	Qualification to Europa League group stage (Note: Since the winners of the EFL Cup and the FA Cup, Manchester City, qualified for the Champions League, the spot given to the FA Cup winners (Europa League group stage) was passed to the sixth-placed team and the spot given to the League Cup winners (Europa League second qualifying round) was passed to the seventh-placed team.)

Source: Premier League
Rules for classification: 1) Points; 2) Goal difference; 3) Goals scored; 4) Play-offs (only if needed to decide champion, teams for relegation or teams for UEFA competitions).
(C) Champions

==== Results summary ====
Overall								Home						Away					
Pld	W	D	L	GF	GA	GD	Pts	W	D	L	GF	GA	GD	W	D	L	GF	GA	GD
38	32	2	4	95	23	+72	98	18	0	1	57	12	+45	14	2	3	38	11	+27

Source: Premier League

==== Results by matchday ====
Matchday	1	2	3	4	5	6	7	8	9	10	11	12	13	14	15	16	17	18	19	20	21	22	23	24	25	26	27	28	29	30	31	32	33	34	35	36	37	38
Ground	A	H	A	H	H	A	H	A	H	A	H	H	A	H	A	A	H	H	A	A	H	H	A	A	H	A	H	H	A	H	A	H	A	H	A	A	H	A
Result	W	W	D	W	W	W	W	D	W	W	W	W	W	W	W	L	W	L	L	W	W	W	W	L	W	W	W	W	W	W	W	W	W	W	W	W	W	W
Position	5	1	5	4	3	2	1	1	1	1	1	1	1	1	1	2	2	2	3	2	2	2	2	2	2	2	2	2	1	1	1	1	1	1	1	1	1	1
Points	3	6	7	10	13	16	19	20	23	26	29	32	35	38	41	41	44	44	44	47	50	53	56	56	59	62	65	68	71	74	77	80	83	86	89	92	95	98

Source: Premier League
A = Away; H = Home; W = Win; D = Draw; L = Loss

==== Fixtures ====
The Premier League fixtures for the 2018–19 season were announced on 14 June 2018.

12 August 2018 1	Arsenal	0–2	Manchester City	Holloway
16:00 BST	Papastathopoulos (yellow card) 27'; Xhaka (yellow card) 52'	Report	Sterling (yellow card) 4', (goal) 14'; B. Silva 64'; De Bruyne (yellow card) 73'	Stadium: Emirates Stadium; Attendance: 59,934 (2,917 away); Referee: Michael Oliver

19 August 2018 2	Manchester City	6–1	Huddersfield Town	Manchester
13:30 BST	Agüero 25', 35', 75'; Gabriel Jesus 31'; D. Silva 48'; Kongolo 84' (o.g.)	Report	Stanković 43'; Billing (yellow card) 51'; Schindler (yellow card) 69'	Stadium: City of Manchester Stadium; Attendance: 54,021 (2,735 away); Referee: Andre Marriner

25 August 2018 3	Wolverhampton Wanderers	1–1	Manchester City	Wolverhampton
12:30 BST	Coady (yellow card) 41'; Boly 57'	Report	Kompany (yellow card) 12'; D. Silva (yellow card) 60'; Laporte 69'	Stadium: Molineux Stadium; Attendance: 31,322 (2,970 away); Referee: Martin Atkinson

1 September 2018 4	Manchester City	2–1	Newcastle United	Manchester
17:30 BST	Sterling 8'; Walker (yellow card) 24', (goal) 52'	Report	Lascelles (yellow card) 20'; Yedlin 30'	Stadium: City of Manchester Stadium; Attendance: 53,946 (2,646 away); Referee: Kevin Friend

15 September 2018 5	Manchester City	3–0	Fulham	Manchester
15:00 BST	Sané 2'; D. Silva 21'; Sterling 47'	Report		Stadium: City of Manchester Stadium; Attendance: 53,307 (2,215 away); Referee: Stuart Attwell

22 September 2018 6	Cardiff City	0–5	Manchester City	Cardiff
15:00 BST	Ralls (yellow card) 45+1'	Report	Agüero 32'; B. Silva 35'; Gündoğan 44'; Fernandinho (yellow card) 60'; Mahrez 67', 89'	Stadium: Cardiff City Stadium; Attendance: 32,321 (2,908 away); Referee: Michael Oliver

29 September 2018 7	Manchester City	2–0	Brighton & Hove Albion	Manchester
15:00 BST	Sterling 29'; Agüero 65'	Report	Knockaert (yellow card) 9'; Duffy (yellow card) 42'; Montoya (yellow card) 87'	Stadium: City of Manchester Stadium; Attendance: 54,152 (2,809 away); Referee: Lee Mason

7 October 2018 8	Liverpool	0–0	Manchester City	Liverpool
16:30 BST	Wijnaldum (yellow card) 90'	Report	B. Silva (yellow card) 21'; Agüero (yellow card) 56'; Mendy (yellow card) 64'; Mahrez (penalty missed) 86'	Stadium: Anfield; Attendance: 52,117 (2,876 away); Referee: Martin Atkinson

20 October 2018 9	Manchester City	5–0	Burnley	Manchester
15:00 BST	Kompany (yellow card) 1'; Agüero 17'; B. Silva 54'; Fernandinho 56'; Sané (yellow card) 81', (goal) 90'; Mahrez 83'	Report	Cork (yellow card) 11'; Hendrick (yellow card) 32'	Stadium: City of Manchester Stadium; Attendance: 54,094 (2,717 away); Referee: Jonathan Moss

29 October 2018 10	Tottenham Hotspur	0–1	Manchester City	Wembley
20:00 GMT	Lucas (yellow card) 45'; Davies (yellow card) 90+4'	Report	Mahrez 6'; Laporte (yellow card) 53'; Fernandinho (yellow card) 61'	Stadium: Wembley Stadium; Attendance: 56,854 (3,055 away); Referee: Kevin Friend

4 November 2018 11	Manchester City	6–1	Southampton	Manchester
15:00 GMT	Hoedt 6' (o.g.); Agüero 12', (yellow card) 38'; D. Silva 18'; Sterling 45+2', 67'; Sané 90+1'	Report	Ward-Prowse (yellow card) 10'; Ings 30' (pen.)	Stadium: City of Manchester Stadium; Attendance: 53,916 (995 away); Referee: Lee Mason

11 November 2018 12	Manchester City	3–1	Manchester United	Manchester
16:30 GMT	D. Silva 12'; B. Silva (yellow card) 33'; Agüero 48'; Gündoğan 86'	Report	Shaw (yellow card) 42'; Martial 58' (pen.)	Stadium: City of Manchester Stadium; Attendance: 54,316 (2,862 away); Referee: Anthony Taylor

24 November 2018 13	West Ham United	0–4	Manchester City	Stratford
15:00 GMT		Report	D. Silva 11'; Sterling 19'; Sané 34', 90+3'	Stadium: London Stadium; Attendance: 56,886 (2,919 away); Referee: Andre Marriner

1 December 2018 14	Manchester City	3–1	Bournemouth	Manchester
15:00 GMT	B. Silva 16'; Sterling 57'; Gündoğan 79'	Report	Wilson 44'	Stadium: City of Manchester Stadium; Attendance: 54,409 (917 away); Referee: Stuart Attwell

4 December 2018 15	Watford	1–2	Manchester City	Watford
20:00 GMT	Doucouré 85'	Report	Sané 40'; Mahrez 51'; Ederson (yellow card) 90'	Stadium: Vicarage Road; Attendance: 20,389 (2,024 away); Referee: Paul Tierney

8 December 2018 16	Chelsea	2–0	Manchester City	Fulham
17:30 GMT	Kanté 45'; Jorginho (yellow card) 63'; David Luiz 78'; Pedro (yellow card) 80'	Report		Stadium: Stamford Bridge; Attendance: 40,571 (2,880 away); Referee: Michael Oliver

15 December 2018 17	Manchester City	3–1	Everton	Manchester
12:30 GMT	Gabriel Jesus 22', 50'; Sterling 69'; Delph (yellow card) 76'	Report	Digne (yellow card) 19'; Calvert-Lewin 65', (yellow card) 76'	Stadium: City of Manchester Stadium; Attendance: 54,173 (2,982 away); Referee: Craig Pawson

22 December 2018 18	Manchester City	2–3	Crystal Palace	Manchester
15:00 GMT	Gündoğan 27'; De Bruyne 85'	Report	Schlupp 33'; Townsend 35'; Zaha (yellow card) 45'; Milivojević 52' (pen.); Van Aanholt (yellow card) 75'; McArthur (yellow card) 80'; Guaita (yellow card) 90+3'	Stadium: City of Manchester Stadium; Attendance: 54,340 (879 away); Referee: Andre Marriner

26 December 2018 19	Leicester City	2–1	Manchester City	Leicester
15:00 GMT	Albrighton 19'; Maguire (yellow card) 58'; Pereira 81'; Vardy (yellow card) 87'	Report	B. Silva 14'; Stones (yellow card) 77'; Delph (red card) 89'; Agüero (yellow card) 90'	Stadium: King Power Stadium; Attendance: 32,090 (3,299 away); Referee: Mike Dean

30 December 2018 20	Southampton	1–3	Manchester City	Southampton
14:15 GMT	Højbjerg 37', (red card) 85'; Austin (yellow card) 58'; Bednarek (yellow card) 73'	Report	D. Silva 10'; Agüero (yellow card) 32', (goal) 45+3'; Ward-Prowse 45' (o.g.); Kompany (yellow card) 72'; Danilo (yellow card) 78'	Stadium: St Mary's Stadium; Attendance: 31,381 (3,198 away); Referee: Paul Tierney

3 January 2019 21	Manchester City	2–1	Liverpool	Manchester
20:00 GMT	Kompany (yellow card) 31'; Agüero 40'; Laporte (yellow card) 45+2'; Sané 72'; B. Silva (yellow card) 89'; Ederson (yellow card) 90+5'	Report	Lovren (yellow card) 20'; Wijnaldum (yellow card) 38'; Firmino 64'	Stadium: City of Manchester Stadium; Attendance: 54,511 (3,018 away); Referee: Anthony Taylor

14 January 2019 22	Manchester City	3–0	Wolverhampton Wanderers	Manchester
20:00 GMT	Gabriel Jesus 10', 39' (pen.); Fernandinho (yellow card) 14'; Coady 78' (o.g.)	Report	Boly (red card) 19'	Stadium: City of Manchester Stadium; Attendance: 54,171 (3,000 away); Referee: Craig Pawson

20 January 2019 23	Huddersfield Town	0–3	Manchester City	Huddersfield
13:30 GMT	Bacuna (yellow card) 30'; Hogg (yellow card) 43'	Report	Danilo 18'; Walker (yellow card) 27'; Fernandinho (yellow card) 50'; Sterling 54'; Sané 56'	Stadium: John Smiths Stadium; Attendance: 24,190 (2,343 away); Referee: Andre Marriner

29 January 2019 24	Newcastle United	2–1	Manchester City	Newcastle
20:00 GMT	Pérez (yellow card) 54'; Rondón 66'; Schär (yellow card) 72'; Ritchie 80' (pen.)	Report	Agüero 1'; De Bruyne (yellow card) 17'; Sterling (yellow card) 34'; Laporte (yellow card) 90+1'	Stadium: St James' Park; Attendance: 50,861 (2,646 away); Referee: Paul Tierney

3 February 2019 25	Manchester City	3–1	Arsenal	Manchester
16:30 GMT	Agüero 1', 44', 61'; Gündoğan (yellow card) 65'	Report	Koscielny 11'; Torreira (yellow card) 40'	Stadium: City of Manchester Stadium; Attendance: 54,483 (3,000 away); Referee: Martin Atkinson

6 February 2019 26	Everton	0–2	Manchester City	Liverpool
19:45 GMT	Zouma (yellow card) 82'	Report	Laporte 45+2'; Fernandinho (yellow card) 73'; Gabriel Jesus 90+7'	Stadium: Goodison Park; Attendance: 39,322 (2,972 away); Referee: Craig Pawson

10 February 2019 27	Manchester City	6–0	Chelsea	Manchester
16:00 GMT	Sterling 4', 80'; Agüero 13', 19', 56' (pen.); Gündoğan 25', (yellow card) 77'	Report	Jorginho (yellow card) 60'; Alonso (yellow card) 69'	Stadium: City of Manchester Stadium; Attendance: 54,452 (3,010 away); Referee: Mike Dean

27 February 2019 28	Manchester City	1–0	West Ham United	Manchester
20:00 GMT	Agüero 59' (pen.)	Report	Fredericks (yellow card) 41'; Antonio (yellow card) 87'	Stadium: City of Manchester Stadium; Attendance: 53,528 (2,391 away); Referee: Stuart Attwell

2 March 2019 29	Bournemouth	0–1	Manchester City	Bournemouth
15:00 GMT	King (yellow card) 84'	Report	Mahrez 55'; Otamendi (yellow card) 65'; Walker (yellow card) 84'	Stadium: Vitality Stadium; Attendance: 10,699 (1,265 away); Referee: Kevin Friend

9 March 2019 30	Manchester City	3–1	Watford	Manchester
17:30 GMT	Walker (yellow card) 6'; Sterling 46', 50', 59'	Report	Cleverley (yellow card) 18'; Deulofeu 66'	Stadium: City of Manchester Stadium; Attendance: 54,104 (1,157 away); Referee: Paul Tierney

30 March 2019 31	Fulham	0–2	Manchester City	Fulham
12:30 GMT	Christie (yellow card) 67'; Le Marchand (yellow card) 80'	Report	B. Silva 5'; Agüero 27'	Stadium: Craven Cottage; Attendance: 25,001 (2,651 away); Referee: Kevin Friend

3 April 2019 32	Manchester City	2–0	Cardiff City	Manchester
19:45 BST	De Bruyne 6'; Sané 44'	Report	Bennett (yellow card) 8'; Peltier (yellow card) 34'; Ralls (yellow card) 53'	Stadium: City of Manchester Stadium; Attendance: 53,559 (882 away); Referee: Jonathan Moss

14 April 2019 33	Crystal Palace	1–3	Manchester City	Selhurst
14:05 BST	Milivojević 81'	Report	Sterling 15', 63'; Gabriel Jesus 90'	Stadium: Selhurst Park; Attendance: 25,721 (2,938 away); Referee: Martin Atkinson

20 April 2019 34	Manchester City	1–0	Tottenham Hotspur	Manchester
12:30 BST	Foden 5'; Sterling (yellow card) 90+3'	Report	Wanyama (yellow card) 86'; Vertonghen (yellow card) 90+3'	Stadium: City of Manchester Stadium; Attendance: 54,489 (3,010 away); Referee: Michael Oliver

24 April 2019 35	Manchester United	0–2	Manchester City	Trafford
20:00 BST	Pereira (yellow card) 24'; Shaw (yellow card) 89'	Report	Kompany (yellow card) 10'; Zinchenko (yellow card) 26'; B. Silva 54'; Sané 66'	Stadium: Old Trafford; Attendance: 74,431 (2,940 away); Referee: Andre Marriner

28 April 2019 36	Burnley	0–1	Manchester City	Burnley
14:05 BST	Lowton (yellow card) 87'	Report	Agüero 63'; Gündoğan (yellow card) 90+5'	Stadium: Turf Moor; Attendance: 21,605 (2,458 away); Referee: Paul Tierney

6 May 2019 37	Manchester City	1–0	Leicester City	Manchester
20:00 BST	D. Silva (yellow card) 22'; Kompany (yellow card) 44', (goal) 70'; Gabriel Jesus (yellow card) 89'	Report	Maguire (yellow card) 35'; Iheanacho (yellow card) 90'	Stadium: City of Manchester Stadium; Attendance: 54,506 (3,010 away); Referee: Mike Dean

12 May 2019 38	Brighton & Hove Albion	1–4	Manchester City	Falmer
15:00 BST	Murray 27'	Report	Agüero 28'; Laporte 38'; Mahrez 63'; Gündoğan 72'	Stadium: Amex Stadium; Attendance: 30,662 (2,942 away); Referee: Michael Oliver

=== FA Cup ===
Manchester City entered the competition in the third round and were given a home tie against Rotherham United. The fourth round draw was made live on BBC by Robbie Keane and Carl Ikeme from Wolverhampton on 7 January 2019. The fifth round draw was broadcast live on BBC on 28 January 2019, with Alex Scott and Ian Wright conducting the draw. The quarter-finals draw was made on 18 February by Darren Fletcher and Wayne Bridge.

6 January 2019 Third round	Manchester City	7–0	Rotherham United	Manchester
14:00 GMT	Sterling 12', (yellow card) 35'; Foden 43'; Ajayi 45+1' (o.g.); Gabriel Jesus 52'; Mahrez 73'; Otamendi 78'; Sané 85'	Report	Wiles (yellow card) 24'	Stadium: City of Manchester Stadium; Attendance: 52,708; Referee: David Coote

26 January 2019 Fourth round	Manchester City	5–0	Burnley	Manchester
15:00 GMT	Walker (yellow card) 21'; Gabriel Jesus 23'; B. Silva 52'; De Bruyne 61'; Long 73' (o.g.); Agüero 85' (pen.)	Report		Stadium: City of Manchester Stadium; Attendance: 50,121; Referee: Graham Scott

16 February 2019 Fifth round	Newport County	1–4	Manchester City	Newport
17:30 GMT	Amond 88'	Report	Sané 51'; Foden 75', 89'; Mahrez 90+4'	Stadium: Rodney Parade; Attendance: 9,680; Referee: Andre Marriner

16 March 2019 Quarter-finals	Swansea City	2–3	Manchester City	Swansea
17:20 GMT	Grimes 20' (pen.); Celina 29'	Report	Laporte (yellow card) 45+3'; B. Silva 69'; Nordfeldt 78' (o.g.); Agüero 88'	Stadium: Liberty Stadium; Attendance: 19,783; Referee: Andre Marriner

6 April 2019 Semi-finals	Manchester City	1–0	Brighton & Hove Albion	Wembley, London
17:30 BST	Gabriel Jesus 4'; Walker (yellow card) 32'; Danilo (yellow card) 50'	Report	Jahanbakhsh (yellow card) 32'; Dunk (yellow card) 72'	Stadium: Wembley Stadium; Attendance: 71,521; Referee: Anthony Taylor

18 May 2019 Final	Manchester City	6–0	Watford	Wembley, London
17:00 BST	D. Silva 26', (yellow card) 60'; Gabriel Jesus 38', 68'; De Bruyne 61'; Sterling 81', 87'	Report	Doucouré (yellow card) 22'; Femenía (yellow card) 80'	Stadium: Wembley Stadium; Attendance: 85,854; Referee: Kevin Friend

=== EFL Cup ===
Manchester City entered the competition in the third round as the defending champions and were drawn away to Oxford United. A home tie against Fulham was confirmed for the fourth round. The semi-finals draw was made live on Sky Sports by Piers Morgan and Peter Crouch on 19 December 2018. City advanced to the final, defending their title by defeating Chelsea on penalties after a goalless draw over the 120 minutes.

25 September 2018 Third round	Oxford United	0–3	Manchester City	Oxford
19:45 BST	Garbutt (yellow card) 37'; Dickie (yellow card) 82'	Report	Gabriel Jesus 36'; Danilo (yellow card) 64'; Mahrez 78'; Foden 90+2'	Stadium: Kassam Stadium; Attendance: 11,956; Referee: Roger East

1 November 2018 Fourth round	Manchester City	2–0	Fulham	Manchester
19:45 GMT	Brahim 18', 65'; Kompany (yellow card) 80'	Report		Stadium: City of Manchester Stadium; Attendance: 35,271; Referee: Martin Atkinson

18 December 2018 Quarter-finals	Leicester City	1–1 (1–3 p)	Manchester City	Leicester
19:45 GMT	Albrighton 73'	Report	De Bruyne 14'; Foden (yellow card) 50'; Gündoğan (yellow card) 85'	Stadium: King Power Stadium; Attendance: 24,644; Referee: Lee Mason
	Penalties
	Maguire (penalty scored); Fuchs (penalty missed); Maddison (penalty missed); Söyüncü (penalty missed)		(penalty scored) Gündoğan; (penalty missed) Sterling; (penalty scored) Gabriel Jesus; (penalty scored) Zinchenko

9 January 2019 Semi-finals First leg	Manchester City	9–0	Burton Albion	Manchester
19:45 GMT	De Bruyne 5'; Gabriel Jesus 30', 34', 57', 65'; Zinchenko 37'; Foden 62'; Walker 70'; Mahrez 83'	Report		Stadium: City of Manchester Stadium; Attendance: 32,089; Referee: Mike Dean

23 January 2019 Semi-finals Second leg	Burton Albion	0–1 (0–10 agg.)	Manchester City	Burton on Trent
19:45 GMT		Report	Agüero 26'	Stadium: Pirelli Stadium; Attendance: 6,519; Referee: Kevin Friend

24 February 2019 Final	Chelsea	0–0 (a.e.t.) (3–4 p)	Manchester City	London
16:30 GMT	David Luiz (yellow card) 30'; Rüdiger (yellow card) 72'; Jorginho (yellow card) 88'	Report	Fernandinho (yellow card) 58'; Otamendi (yellow card) 90+1'	Stadium: Wembley Stadium; Attendance: 81,775; Referee: Jonathan Moss
	Penalties
	Jorginho (penalty missed); Azpilicueta (penalty scored); Emerson (penalty scored); David Luiz (penalty missed); Hazard (penalty scored)		(penalty scored) Gündoğan; (penalty scored) Agüero; (penalty missed) Sané; (penalty scored) B. Silva; (penalty scored) Sterling

=== UEFA Champions League ===
On 30 August 2018, Manchester City were drawn in Group F of the UEFA Champions League alongside Shakhtar Donetsk, Lyon and 1899 Hoffenheim.

==== Group stage ====
Pos	Team	Pld	W	D	L	GF	GA	GD	Pts	Qualification
1	(England) Manchester City	6	4	1	1	16	6	+10	13	Advance to knockout phase
2	(France) Lyon	6	1	5	0	12	11	+1	8	Advance to knockout phase
3	(Ukraine) Shakhtar Donetsk	6	1	3	2	8	16	−8	6	Transfer to Europa League
4	(Germany) TSG Hoffenheim	6	0	3	3	11	14	−3	3	

Source: UEFA

19 September 2018 1	Manchester City (England)	1–2	(France) Lyon	Manchester
20:00 BST	B. Silva 67'; Agüero (yellow card) 90+1'	Report	Cornet 26'; Fekir 43', (yellow card) 77'; Traoré (yellow card) 90+3'	Stadium: City of Manchester Stadium; Attendance: 40,111; Referee: Daniele Orsato (Italy)

2 October 2018 2	1899 Hoffenheim (Germany)	1–2	(England) Manchester City	Sinsheim
17:55 BST	Belfodil 1'; Demirbay (yellow card) 57'	Report	Agüero 8', (yellow card) 90+4'; Otamendi (yellow card) 12'; Fernandinho (yellow card) 36'; Walker (yellow card) 66'; D. Silva 87'	Stadium: Rhein-Neckar-Arena; Attendance: 24,851; Referee: Damir Skomina (Slovenia)

23 October 2018 3	Shakhtar Donetsk (Ukraine)	0–3	(England) Manchester City	Kharkiv
20:00 BST	Kryvtsov (yellow card) 87'	Report	D. Silva 30'; Laporte 35'; B. Silva 71'; Otamendi (yellow card) 90+4'	Stadium: Metalist Oblast Sports Complex; Attendance: 37,106; Referee: Carlos del Cerro Grande (Spain)

7 November 2018 4	Manchester City (England)	6–0	(Ukraine) Shakhtar Donetsk	Manchester
20:00 GMT	D. Silva 13'; Gabriel Jesus 24' (pen.), 72' (pen.), 90+2'; Sterling 49'; Mahrez 84'	Report		Stadium: City of Manchester Stadium; Attendance: 52,286; Referee: Viktor Kassai (Hungary)

27 November 2018 5	Lyon (France)	2–2	(England) Manchester City	Lyon
20:00 GMT	Cornet 55', 81'; F. Mendy (yellow card) 62'	Report	Fernandinho (yellow card) 23'; Sterling (yellow card) 34'; Laporte 62'; Agüero 83'	Stadium: Parc Olympique Lyonnais; Attendance: 56,039; Referee: Gianluca Rocchi (Italy)

12 December 2018 6	Manchester City (England)	2–1	(Germany) 1899 Hoffenheim	Manchester
20:00 GMT	Sané 45+1', 61'	Report	Kramarić 16' (pen.); Grillitsch (yellow card) 64'; Joelinton (yellow card) 77'	Stadium: City of Manchester Stadium; Attendance: 50,411; Referee: Andreas Ekberg (Sweden)

==== Knockout phase ====
On 17 December 2018, the round of 16 draw was made in Nyon, Switzerland.

===== Round of 16 =====
20 February 2019 First leg	Schalke 04 (Germany)	2–3	(England) Manchester City	Gelsenkirchen
21:00 CET (UTC+01:00)	Bentaleb 38' (pen.), 45' (pen.); Uth (yellow card) 41'; Sané (yellow card) 73'; Burgstaller (yellow card) 90+5'	Report	Agüero 18'; Otamendi (yellow card) 36' (yellow-red card) 68'; Fernandinho (yellow card) 43'; Sané 85'; Sterling 90'; Ederson (yellow card) 90+5'	Stadium: Arena AufSchalke; Attendance: 54,417; Referee: Carlos del Cerro Grande (Spain)

12 March 2019 Second leg	Manchester City (England)	7–0 (10–2 agg.)	(Germany) Schalke 04	Manchester
21:00 CET (UTC+01:00)	Agüero 35' (pen.), 38'; Sané 42'; Danilo (yellow card) 48'; Sterling 56'; Zinchenko (yellow card) 69'; B. Silva 71'; Foden 78'; Gabriel Jesus 84'	Report	Bruma (yellow card) 33'	Stadium: City of Manchester Stadium; Attendance: 51,518; Referee: Clément Turpin (France)

===== Quarter-finals =====
The draw for the quarter-finals was held on 15 March 2019, 12:00 CET, at the UEFA headquarters in Nyon, Switzerland.

9 April 2019 First leg	Tottenham Hotspur (England)	1–0	(England) Manchester City	London
20:00 BST	Rose (yellow card) 12'; Son 78'	Report	Agüero (penalty missed) 13'; Laporte (yellow card) 28'; Mahrez (yellow card) 59'	Stadium: Tottenham Hotspur Stadium; Attendance: 60,044; Referee: Björn Kuipers (Netherlands)

17 April 2019 Second leg	Manchester City (England)	4–3 (4–4 (a) agg.)	(England) Tottenham Hotspur	Manchester
20:00 BST	Sterling 4', 21'; B. Silva 11'; Agüero 59'	Report	Son 7', 10', (yellow card) 48'; Sissoko (yellow card) 41'; Rose (yellow card) 54'; Llorente 73'; Wanyama (yellow card) 77'	Stadium: City of Manchester Stadium; Attendance: 53,348; Referee: Cüneyt Çakır (Turkey)

== Squad information ==
=== First-team squad ===
N	Pos.	Nat.	Name	Age	Since	App	Goals	Ends	Transfer fee	Notes
1	GK	(Chile)	Claudio Bravo	36	2016	44	0	2020	£15.4m	Second nationality: Spain
2	DF	(England)	Kyle Walker	28	2017	100	2	2022	£45m	
3	DF	(Brazil)	Danilo	27	2017	60	4	2022	£26.5m	
4	DF	(Belgium)	Vincent Kompany (c)	33	2008	360	20	2019	£6m	Captain
5	DF	(England)	John Stones	24	2016	109	5	2022	£47.5m	
7	FW	(England)	Raheem Sterling	24	2015	191	69	2023	£44m	
8	MF	(Germany)	İlkay Gündoğan	28	2016	114	17	2020	£20m	
10	FW	(Argentina)	Sergio Agüero	30	2011	338	231	2021	£31.5m	All time top goalscorer
14	DF	(France)	Aymeric Laporte	24	2018	64	5	2025	£57m	
15	DF	(France)	Eliaquim Mangala	28	2014	79	0	2020	£42m	
17	MF	(Belgium)	Kevin De Bruyne	27	2015	174	41	2023	£54.5m	
18	MF	(England)	Fabian Delph	29	2015	89	5	2020	£8m	
19	FW	(Germany)	Leroy Sané	23	2016	133	39	2021	£37m	
20	MF	(Portugal)	Bernardo Silva	24	2017	104	22	2025	£43.5m	
21	MF	(Spain)	David Silva	33	2010	396	71	2020	£24m	
22	DF	(France)	Benjamin Mendy	24	2017	23	0	2022	£52m	
25	MF	(Brazil)	Fernandinho	34	2013	273	23	2020	£30m	
26	FW	(Algeria)	Riyad Mahrez	28	2018	44	12	2023	£60m	Record signing
30	DF	(Argentina)	Nicolás Otamendi	31	2015	169	8	2022	£28m	
31	GK	(Brazil)	Ederson	25	2017	100	0	2025	£34.9m	Second nationality: Portugal
32	GK	(England)	Daniel Grimshaw	22	2019	0	0	2021	Youth system	Academy graduate
33	FW	(Brazil)	Gabriel Jesus	22	2017	100	45	2023	£27m	
34	DF	(Netherlands)	Philippe Sandler	22	2018	2	0	2022	£2.6m	
35	MF	(Ukraine)	Oleksandr Zinchenko	22	2016	43	1	2021	£1.7m	
47	MF	(England)	Phil Foden	18	2017	36	7	2024	Youth system	Academy graduate
49	GK	(Kosovo)	Arijanet Muric	20	2018	5	0	2020	Youth system	Academy graduate

Updated to match played 18 May 2019
Source: Manchester City
Ordered by squad number.
Appearances include league and cup appearances, including as substitute.
Age stated as at the end of 2018–19 season.

== Statistics ==
As of 18 May 2019

=== Squad statistics ===
Appearances (Apps) numbers are for appearances in competitive games only, including sub appearances.
Red card numbers denote: numbers in parentheses represent red cards overturned for wrongful dismissal.

No.	Nat.	Player	Pos.	Premier League				FA Cup				League Cup				Community Shield				Champions League				Total			
No.	Nat.	Player	Pos.	Apps	Goal	Booked	Sent off (straight red)	Apps	Goal	Booked	Sent off (straight red)	Apps	Goal	Booked	Sent off (straight red)	Apps	Goal	Booked	Sent off (straight red)	Apps	Goal	Booked	Sent off (straight red)	Apps	Goal	Booked	Sent off (straight red)
1	(Chile)	Claudio Bravo	GK													1								1			
2	(England)	Kyle Walker	DF	33	1	3		5		2		3	1			1				10		1		52	2	6	
3	(Brazil)	Danilo	DF	11	1	1		4		1		5		1						2		1		22	1	4	
4	(Belgium)	Vincent Kompany	DF	17	1	6		1				3		1		1				4				26	1	7	
5	(England)	John Stones	DF	24		1		5				3				1				6				39		1	
7	(England)	Raheem Sterling	MF	34	17	3		4	3	1		3								10	5	1		51	25	5	
8	(Germany)	İlkay Gündoğan	MF	31	6	3		6				4		1		1				8				50	6	4	
10	(Argentina)	Sergio Agüero	FW	33	21	3		2	2			3	1			1	2			7	6	2		46	32	5	
14	(France)	Aymeric Laporte	DF	35	3	3		4		1		1				1				10	2	1		51	5	5	
15	(France)	Eliaquim Mangala	DF																								
17	(Belgium)	Kevin De Bruyne	MF	19	2	2		4	2			5	2							4				32	6	2	
18	(England)	Fabian Delph	MF	11		1	1	1				2								6				20		1	1
19	(Germany)	Leroy Sané	MF	31	10	1		4	2			3				1				8	4			47	16	1	
20	(Portugal)	Bernardo Silva	MF	36	7	3		4	2			2				1				8	4			51	13	3	
21	(Spain)	David Silva	MF	33	6	3		5	1	1		3								9	3			50	10	4	
22	(France)	Benjamin Mendy	DF	10		1		1				1				1				2				15		1	
25	(Brazil)	Fernandinho	MF	29	1	5		3				1		1		1				8		3		42	1	9	
26	(Algeria)	Riyad Mahrez	MF	27	7			5	2			5	2			1				6	1	1		44	12	1	
30	(Argentina)	Nicolás Otamendi	DF	18		1		5	1			4		1		1				5		2	1	33	1	4	1
31	(Brazil)	Ederson	GK	38		2		6				1								10		1		55		3	
32	(England)	Daniel Grimshaw	GK																								
33	(Brazil)	Gabriel Jesus	FW	29	7	1		6	5			5	5			1				6	4			47	21	1	
34	(Netherlands)	Philippe Sandler	DF					1				1												2			
35	(Ukraine)	Oleksandr Zinchenko	MF	14		1		4				6	1							5		1		29	1	2	
47	(England)	Phil Foden	MF	13	1			3	3			5	2	1		1				4	1			26	7	1	
49	(Kosovo)	Arijanet Muric	GK									5												5			
50	(Spain)	Eric García	DF									3												3			
55	(Spain)	Brahim	MF									3	2			1								4	2		
61	(England)	Felix Nmecha	MF									1												1			
81	(France)	Claudio Gomes	MF									1				1								2			
82	(Spain)	Adrián Bernabé	MF									1												1			
83	(England)	Ian Poveda	FW									1												1			
Own goals					4				3																7		
Totals					95	44	1		26	6	0		16	6	0		2	0	0		30	14	1		169	69	2

=== Goalscorers ===
Includes all competitive matches. The list is sorted alphabetically by surname when total goals are equal.

No.	Pos.	Player	Premier League	FA Cup	League Cup	Community Shield	Champions League	TOTAL
10	FW	(Argentina) Sergio Agüero	21	2	1	2	6	32
7	FW	(England) Raheem Sterling	17	3	0	0	5	25
33	FW	(Brazil) Gabriel Jesus	7	5	5	0	4	21
19	FW	(Germany) Leroy Sané	10	2	0	0	4	16
20	MF	(Portugal) Bernardo Silva	7	2	0	0	4	13
26	FW	(Algeria) Riyad Mahrez	7	2	2	0	1	12
21	MF	(Spain) David Silva	6	1	0	0	3	10
47	MF	(England) Phil Foden	1	3	2	0	1	7
17	MF	(Belgium) Kevin De Bruyne	2	2	2	0	0	6
8	MF	(Germany) İlkay Gündoğan	6	0	0	0	0	6
14	DF	(France) Aymeric Laporte	3	0	0	0	2	5
55	MF	(Spain) Brahim	0	0	2	0	0	2
2	DF	(England) Kyle Walker	1	0	1	0	0	2
3	DF	(Brazil) Danilo	1	0	0	0	0	1
25	MF	(Brazil) Fernandinho	1	0	0	0	0	1
4	DF	(Belgium) Vincent Kompany	1	0	0	0	0	1
30	DF	(Argentina) Nicolás Otamendi	0	1	0	0	0	1
35	MF	(Ukraine) Oleksandr Zinchenko	0	0	1	0	0	1
Own goals			4	3	0	0	0	7
Totals			95	26	16	2	30	169

=== Hat-tricks ===
Player	Against	Result	Date	Competition	Ref
(Argentina) Sergio Agüero	Huddersfield Town	6–1 (H)	19 August 2018	Premier League	
(Brazil) Gabriel Jesus	(Ukraine) Shakhtar Donetsk	6–0 (H)	7 November 2018	UEFA Champions League	
(Brazil) Gabriel Jesus^{4}	Burton Albion	9–0 (H)	9 January 2019	EFL Cup	
(Argentina) Sergio Agüero	Arsenal	3–1 (H)	3 February 2019	Premier League	
(Argentina) Sergio Agüero	Chelsea	6–0 (H)	10 February 2019	Premier League	
(England) Raheem Sterling	Watford	3–1 (H)	9 March 2019	Premier League	

(H) – Home; (A) – Away; (N) – Neutral
^{4} – Player scored four goals

=== Clean sheets ===
The list is sorted by shirt number when total clean sheets are equal. Numbers in parentheses represent games where both goalkeepers participated and both kept a clean sheet; the number in parentheses is awarded to the goalkeeper who was substituted on, whilst a full clean sheet is awarded to the goalkeeper who was on the field at the start of play.

No.	Player	Premier League	FA Cup	League Cup	Community Shield	Champions League	TOTAL
31	(Brazil) Ederson	20	4	1	0	3	28
49	(Kosovo) Arijanet Muric	0	0	4	0	0	4
1	(Chile) Claudio Bravo	0	0	0	1	0	1
Totals		20	4	5	1	3	33

== Awards ==
=== Etihad Player of the Month ===
Month	Player
August	(Argentina) Sergio Agüero
September	(Argentina) Sergio Agüero
October	(Algeria) Riyad Mahrez
November	(England) Raheem Sterling
December	(Portugal) Bernardo Silva
January	(Argentina) Sergio Agüero
February	(Ukraine) Oleksandr Zinchenko
March	(Portugal) Bernardo Silva

=== Premier League Manager of the Month ===
Month	Manager
February	(Spain) Pep Guardiola
April	(Spain) Pep Guardiola

=== Premier League Player of the Month ===
Month	Player
November	(England) Raheem Sterling
February	(Argentina) Sergio Agüero

=== Alan Hardaker Trophy ===
Awarded to the player of the match in the EFL Cup final.

Year	Player
2019	(Portugal) Bernardo Silva

=== PFA Team of the Year ===
Position	Player
GK	(Brazil) Ederson
DF	(France) Aymeric Laporte
MF	(Portugal) Bernardo Silva
MF	(Brazil) Fernandinho
FW	(England) Raheem Sterling
FW	(Argentina) Sergio Agüero

=== PFA Young Player of the Year ===
Year	Player
2019	(England) Raheem Sterling

=== FWA Player of the Year ===
Year	Player
2019	(England) Raheem Sterling

=== Premier League Manager of the Season ===
Year	Manager
2019	(Spain) Pep Guardiola

=== Etihad Player of the Season ===
Manchester City's player of the season.

Season	Player
2018–19	(Portugal) Bernardo Silva

== Transfers and loans ==
=== Transfers in ===
Date from	Position	No.	Name	From club	Fee	Joining squad	Ref.
1 July 2018	MF	82	(Spain) Adrián Bernabé	(Spain) Barcelona B	Free transfer	Academy	
2 July 2018	FW	96	(England) Ben Knight	(England) Ipswich Town	£700,000	Academy	
10 July 2018	MF	26	(Algeria) Riyad Mahrez	(England) Leicester City	£60,000,000	First team	
25 July 2018	MF	81	(France) Claudio Gomes	(France) Paris Saint-Germain Youth Academy	Free transfer	Academy	
31 July 2018	DF	34	(Netherlands) Philippe Sandler	(Netherlands) PEC Zwolle	£2,600,000	First team	
9 August 2018	MF	—	(Australia) Daniel Arzani	(Australia) Melbourne City	Undisclosed	Academy	
31 August 2018	FW	70	(Netherlands) Jayden Braaf	(Netherlands) Jong PSV	Free transfer	Academy	
14 January 2019	DF	—	(Japan) Ko Itakura	(Japan) Kawasaki Frontale	Undisclosed	Academy	
31 January 2019	MF	—	(Croatia) Ante Palaversa	(Croatia) Hajduk Split	Undisclosed	Academy	
31 January 2019	GK	—	(Republic of Ireland) Gavin Bazunu	(Republic of Ireland) Shamrock Rovers	£420,000	Academy	
Total					▼£63,720,000		

=== Transfers out ===
Date from	Position	No.	Name	To club	Fee	From squad	Ref.
15 June 2018	DF	69	(Spain) Angeliño	(Netherlands) PSV	£5,000,000	First team	
26 June 2018	DF	56	(England) Ashley Smith-Brown	(England) Plymouth Argyle	Undisclosed	Academy	
1 July 2018	MF	84	(England) Sadou Diallo	(England) Wolverhampton Wanderers	Released	Academy	
1 July 2018	FW	44	(Netherlands) Javairô Dilrosun	(Germany) Hertha BSC	Free transfer	Academy	
1 July 2018	FW	—	(England) Bobby Duncan	(England) Liverpool	Released	Academy	
1 July 2018	DF	45	(England) Demeaco Duhaney	(England) Huddersfield Town	Released	Academy	
1 July 2018	DF	—	(England) Harold Essien	(England) Middlesbrough	Undisclosed	Academy	
1 July 2018	DF	50	(Spain) Pablo Maffeo	(Germany) VfB Stuttgart	£9,000,000	First team	
1 July 2018	MF	—	(Ghana) Divine Naah	(Belgium) Tubize	Free transfer	Academy	
1 July 2018	MF	85	(England) Will Patching	(England) Notts County	Free transfer	Academy	
1 July 2018	DF	71	(Spain) Erik Sarmiento	(Spain) Espanyol	Released	Academy	
1 July 2018	GK	88	(Poland) Paweł Sokół	(Poland) Korona Kielce	Free transfer	Academy	
1 July 2018	MF	42	(Ivory Coast) Yaya Touré	(Greece) Olympiacos	Released	First team	
1 July 2018	MF	83	(England) Marcus Wood	(England) Bolton Wanderers	Released	Academy	
2 July 2018	FW	—	(Nigeria) Olarenwaju Kayode	(Ukraine) Shakhtar Donetsk	£3,000,000	Academy	
2 July 2018	MF	82	(England) Jacob Davenport	(England) Blackburn Rovers	Undisclosed	Academy	
10 July 2018	GK	54	(England) Angus Gunn	(England) Southampton	£13,500,000	First team	
12 July 2018	MF	—	(England) Pascal Kpohomouh	(England) Southampton	Undisclosed	Academy	
12 July 2018	FW	—	(England) Benni Smales-Braithwaite	(England) Southampton	Undisclosed	Academy	
17 July 2018	MF	70	(England) Isaac Buckley-Ricketts	(England) Peterborough United	Undisclosed	Academy	
18 July 2018	MF	78	(Netherlands) Rodney Kongolo	(Netherlands) Heerenveen	£750,000	Academy	
18 July 2018	MF	—	(Ghana) Yaw Yeboah	(Spain) Numancia	Undisclosed	Academy	
31 July 2018	DF	86	(England) Ash Kigbu	(Austria) Wolfsberger AC	Undisclosed	Academy	
31 July 2018	MF	59	(Kosovo) Bersant Celina	(Wales) Swansea City	£3,000,000	Academy	
2 August 2018	MF	52	(England) Kean Bryan	(England) Sheffield United	Free transfer	Academy	
4 August 2018	MF	—	(England) Reece Devine	(England) Manchester United	Undisclosed	Academy	
7 August 2018	GK	13	(England) Joe Hart	(England) Burnley	£3,500,000	First team	
21 August 2018	DF	28	(Belgium) Jason Denayer	(France) Lyon	£5,800,000	First team	
31 August 2018	MF	45	(Nigeria) Chidiebere Nwakali	(Poland) Raków	Undisclosed	Academy	
6 January 2019	MF	55	(Spain) Brahim	(Spain) Real Madrid	£15,500,000	First team	
18 January 2019	DF	79	(England) Edward Francis	(England) Wolverhampton Wanderers	Undisclosed	Academy	
29 January 2019	FW	84	(Wales) Rabbi Matondo	(Germany) Schalke 04	£11,000,000	Academy	
31 January 2019	DF	—	(Republic of Ireland) Ryan Corrigan	(England) Stoke City	Undisclosed	Academy	
19 March 2019	GK	36	(England) Curtis Anderson	(United States) Charlotte Independence	Undisclosed	Academy	
Total					▲£70,050,000		

=== Loans out ===
Date from	Date to	Position	No.	Name	To club	From squad	Ref.
14 February 2017	31 December 2018	MF	—	(Venezuela) Yangel Herrera	(United States) New York City FC	Academy	
11 August 2017	9 January 2019 (Note: Ivan Ilić's planned 2 season-long loan to Red Star Belgrade was ended on 9 January.)	MF	—	(Serbia) Ivan Ilić	(Serbia) Red Star Belgrade	Academy	
21 August 2017	9 January 2019 (Note: Antuna's planned 2 season-long loan to FC Gronigan was ended on 9 January.)	MF	—	(Mexico) Uriel Antuna	(Netherlands) Groningen	Academy	
16 January 2018	31 December 2018	FW	29	(Colombia) Marlos Moreno	(Brazil) Flamengo	First team	
1 July 2018	1 January 2019 (Note: Cáceres's planned season-long loan to Melbourne City was ended on 1 January.)	MF	—	(Australia) Anthony Cáceres	(Australia) Melbourne City	Academy	
1 July 2018	30 June 2019	DF	—	(Spain) Pablo Marí	(Spain) Deportivo La Coruña	Academy	
3 July 2018	30 June 2019	MF	65	(Wales) Matthew Smith	(Netherlands) Twente	Academy	
4 July 2018	18 January 2019 (Note: Ed Francis's planned season long loan to Almere City was ended on 18 January when he was sold to Wolverhampton Wanderers.)	DF	79	(England) Edward Francis	(Netherlands) Almere City	Academy	
5 July 2018	30 June 2019	MF	—	(Australia) Luke Brattan	(Australia) Melbourne City	Academy	
7 July 2018	30 June 2019	MF	76	(Spain) Manu García	(France) Toulouse	First team	
7 July 2018	30 June 2019	DF	—	(United States) Erik Palmer-Brown	(Netherlands) NAC Breda	Academy	
9 July 2018	30 June 2019	MF	75	(Spain) Aleix García	(Spain) Girona	First team	
12 July 2018	30 June 2019	MF	67	(Spain) Paolo Fernandes	(Netherlands) NAC Breda	Academy	
18 July 2018	18 July 2019	MF	—	(United States) Mix Diskerud	(South Korea) Ulsan Hyundai	Academy	
26 July 2018	30 June 2019	FW	68	(France) Thierry Ambrose	(France) Lens	Academy	
30 July 2018	30 June 2019	FW	39	(England) Jack Harrison	(England) Leeds United	Academy	
31 July 2018	22 August 2018 (Note: Muric's planned season-long loan to NAC Breda was ended on 22 August due to an injury to Manchester City's second-choice goalkeeper Claudio Bravo.)	GK	49	(Montenegro) Arijanet Muric	(Netherlands) NAC Breda	First team	
3 August 2018	30 June 2019	DF	24	(England) Tosin Adarabioyo	(England) West Bromwich Albion	First team	
3 August 2018	30 June 2019	MF	—	(Serbia) Luka Ilić	(Netherlands) NAC Breda	Academy	
7 August 2018	30 June 2019	MF	62	(England) Brandon Barker	(England) Preston North End	Academy	
8 August 2018	30 June 2019	FW	85	(Ghana) Thomas Agyepong	(Scotland) Hibernian	Academy	
9 August 2018	30 June 2019	FW	43	(England) Lucas Nmecha	(England) Preston North End	First team	
16 August 2018	30 June 2019	MF	27	(England) Patrick Roberts	(Spain) Girona	First team	
17 August 2018	30 June 2020	MF	—	(Australia) Daniel Arzani	(Scotland) Celtic	Academy	
30 August 2018	30 June 2019	MF	—	(Ghana) Ernest Agyiri	(Belgium) Tubize	Academy	
31 August 2018	30 June 2019	MF	57	(France) Aaron Nemane	(Belgium) Tubize	Academy	
31 August 2018	30 June 2019	MF	38	(Brazil) Douglas Luiz	(Spain) Girona	Academy	
31 August 2018	4 January 2019	DF	58	(England) Charlie Oliver	(England) Brentford B	Academy	
31 August 2018	31 January 2019 (Note: Collins Tanor's planned season long loan to Hobro IK was ended on 31 January.)	MF	—	(Ghana) Collins Tanor	(Denmark) Hobro	Academy	
1 January 2019	30 June 2019	MF	—	(Australia) Anthony Cáceres	(Australia) Sydney FC	Academy	
9 January 2019	30 June 2019	MF	—	(Serbia) Ivan Ilić	(Serbia) Zemun	Academy	
14 January 2019	30 June 2020	DF	—	(Japan) Ko Itakura	(Netherlands) Groningen	Academy	
16 January 2019	30 June 2019	MF	—	(Venezuela) Yangel Herrera	(Spain) Huesca	Academy	
24 January 2019	30 June 2019	FW	74	(England) Luke Bolton	(England) Wycombe Wanderers	First team	
25 January 2019	30 June 2019	MF	29	(Colombia) Marlos Moreno	(Mexico) Santos Laguna	First team	
29 January 2019	31 December 2019	MF	—	(Mexico) Uriel Antuna	(United States) LA Galaxy	Academy	
31 January 2019	30 June 2020	MF	—	(Croatia) Ante Palaversa	(Croatia) Hajduk Split	Academy	
31 January 2019	30 June 2019	MF	—	(Ghana) Collins Tanor	(Denmark) Thisted	Academy	

=== Overall transfer activity ===
Expenditure

Summer: ▼£63,300,000

Winter: ▼£420,000

Total: ▼£63,720,000

Income

Summer: ▲£43,550,000

Winter: ▲£26,500,000

Total: ▲£70,050,000

Net totals

Summer: ▼£19,750,000

Winter: ▲£26,080,000

Total: ▲£6,330,000
