= Philippe Sandler =

Dutch footballer (born 1997)

Personal information
- Full name: Philippe Sandler
- Date of birth: 10 February 1997 (age 29)
- Place of birth: Amsterdam, Netherlands
- Height: 1.88 m (6 ft 2 in)
- Position: Centre-back

Team information
- Current team: NEC
- Number: 3

Youth career
- Ajax

Senior career*
Years	Team	Apps	(Gls)
2016–2018	PEC Zwolle	30	(0)
2018–2022	Manchester City	0	(0)
2019–2020	→ Anderlecht (loan)	9	(0)
2021–2022	→ Troyes (loan)	2	(0)
2022	Feyenoord	2	(0)
2022–	NEC	92	(2)

International career
2017	Netherlands U20	4	(0)
- * Club domestic league appearances and goals as of 12 September 2026

Philippe Sandler (born 10 February 1997) is a Dutch professional footballer who plays as a centre-back for Eredivisie club NEC Nijmegen.

== Club career ==
Born in Amsterdam, Sandler began his senior career with PEC Zwolle in the 2016–17 season, having previously played youth football for Ajax.

In January 2018 it was announced that Sandler would leave PEC Zwolle to join English club Manchester City in the summer of 2018, for a transfer fee reported to be between €2.5 and 3 million. The transfer went through on 31 July 2018. Sandler requested the number 34 shirt in tribute to former Ajax teammate Abdelhak Nouri, who collapsed and suffered brain damage, ending his career.

Sandler made his City debut on 6 January 2019, coming on as a substitute in a 7–0 win over Rotherham United in the FA Cup.

Sandler was loaned to Anderlecht for the 2019–20 season, joining up with Anderlecht player-manager, former City teammate Vincent Kompany.

In the 2020–21 season, Sandler underwent surgery for an ankle injury which left him out of the City first team squad for almost the entire season. He was however able to play in some of the final Academy team games of the season.

On 31 August 2021 he moved on loan to French club Troyes. After two appearances, the loan was ended on 25 January 2022.

He signed for Feyenoord on 1 February 2022, signing a contract until the end of the season with the option to extend for another year. He made his debut for the club on 8 May in a 2–2 draw against PSV. On 27 May 2022, Feyenoord confirmed that the club would not be using the option to extend his contract for another year.

On 11 August 2022, Sandler signed a three-year contract with NEC Nijmegen. He scored his first goal in the Eredivisie on 23 October, deep into overtime to secure a 3–3 home draw against Go Ahead Eagles.

== International career ==
Sandler has represented the Netherlands at under-20 level. He is eligible to play for the Netherlands, South Africa, and United States, having been born to a South African father and American mother.

== Personal life ==
Sandler was born in Amsterdam to a South African father and an American mother. His father is Jewish.

== Career statistics ==
As of match played 17 September 2026

Appearances and goals by club, season and competition
Club	Season	League			National cup (Note: Includes KNVB Cup, FA Cup)		League cup (Note: Includes EFL Cup)		Europe		Other		Total	
Club	Season	Division	Apps	Goals	Apps	Goals	Apps	Goals	Apps	Goals	Apps	Goals	Apps	Goals
PEC Zwolle	2016–17	Eredivisie	7	0	0	0	—		—		—		7	0
PEC Zwolle	2017–18	Eredivisie	23	0	3	1	—		—		—		26	1
PEC Zwolle	Total		30	0	3	1	0	0	0	0	0	0	33	1
Manchester City U23	2018–19	—			—		—		—		2 (Note: Appearance(s) in EFL Trophy)	0	2	0
Manchester City	2018–19	Premier League	0	0	1	0	1	0	0	0	0	0	2	0
Manchester City	2019–20	Premier League	0	0	0	0	0	0	0	0	0	0	0	0
Manchester City	2020–21	Premier League	0	0	0	0	0	0	0	0	—		0	0
Manchester City	2021–22	Premier League	0	0	0	0	0	0	0	0	0	0	0	0
Manchester City	Total		0	0	1	0	1	0	0	0	0	0	2	0
Anderlecht (loan)	2019–20	Belgian Pro League	9	0	2	0	0	0	—		—		11	0
Troyes (loan)	2021–22	Ligue 1	2	0	0	0	—		—		—		2	0
Feyenoord	2021–22	Eredivisie	2	0	0	0	—		0	0	—		2	0
NEC	2022–23	Eredivisie	21	1	2	0	—		—		—		23	1
NEC	2023–24	Eredivisie	24	0	4	0	—		—		0	0	28	1
NEC	2024–25	Eredivisie	19	0	1	0	—		—		1 (Note: Appearance(s) in Eredivisie play-offs)	0	28	1
NEC	2025–26	Eredivisie	25	1	4	0	—		—		—		29	1
NEC	2026–27	Eredivisie	3	0	0	0	—		3 (Note: Two appearances in UEFA Champions League, one appearance in UEFA Europa League)	0	—		6	0
NEC	Total		92	2	11	0	0	0	3	0	1	0	107	2
Career total			135	2	17	1	1	0	3	0	3	0	159	3

== Honours ==
Feyenoord

- UEFA Europa Conference League runner-up: 2021–22
