= 2022–23 Palermo FC season =

Palermo
2022–23 season
- Owner: City Football Group (80%); Hera Hora S.r.l. (19,75%); Associazione Amici Rosanero (0,25%)
- Chairman: Dario Mirri
- Manager: Stefano Di Benedetto (Coppa Italia, as caretaker); Eugenio Corini (Serie B)
- Stadium: Renzo Barbera
- Serie B: 9th
- Coppa Italia: Round of 64
- Top goalscorer: League: Matteo Brunori (17); All: Matteo Brunori (20)
- Highest home attendance: 32,235 (v Brescia)
- Lowest home attendance: League: 14,961 (v Venezia); Overall: 13,297 (v Reggiana, Coppa Italia)
- Average home league attendance: 20,389
- Biggest win: 5–2 (v Modena)
- Biggest defeat: 0–3 (v Torino, Reggina and Ternana)

The 2022–23 season was the 94th in the history of Palermo F.C. and their first season back in the second division since 2019. The club participated in Serie B and Coppa Italia.

== Players ==
=== First team squad ===
As of 1 April 2023

Note: Flags indicate national team as defined under FIFA eligibility rules; some limited exceptions apply. Players may hold more than one non-FIFA nationality.

No.	Pos.	Nation	Player
1	GK	ITA	Giovanni Grotta
2	DF	DEN	Simon Graves
2	DF	ITA	Edoardo Pierozzi
3	DF	ITA	Marco Sala
4	DF	ITA	Andrea Accardi
4	DF	URU	Renzo Orihuela
5	MF	FRA	Claudio Gomes
5	DF	ITA	Michele Somma
6	DF	ITA	Roberto Crivello
7	FW	ITA	Roberto Floriano (Note: Player was Vice-captain until his release occurred during the season.)
7	FW	ITA	Gennaro Tutino
8	MF	ITA	Jacopo Segre
9	FW	ITA	Matteo Brunori (Captain)
10	FW	ITA	Francesco Di Mariano
10	FW	ITA	Andrea Silipo
11	FW	ITA	Giuseppe Fella
11	DF	ITA	Edoardo Masciangelo
12	GK	ITA	Samuele Massolo
14	MF	ITA	Jérémie Broh
15	DF	ITA	Ivan Marconi (Vice-captain)
16	MF	SLO	Leo Štulac
17	MF	ITA	Gregorio Luperini

No.	Pos.	Nation	Player
18	DF	ROU	Ionuț Nedelcearu
19	FW	ITA	Luca Vido
20	MF	ITA	Francesco De Rose (Note: Player was Captain until his release occurred during the season.)
21	MF	ITA	Samuele Damiani
22	GK	ITA	Mirko Pigliacelli
23	DF	ALB	Masimiliano Doda
25	DF	ITA	Alessio Buttaro
26	MF	ITA	Valerio Verre
27	FW	ITA	Edoardo Soleri
28	MF	BIH	Dario Šarić
30	MF	ITA	Nicola Valente
31	DF	ITA	Giuseppe Aurelio
31	FW	ITA	Giacomo Corona
34	DF	SRB	Mladen Devetak
37	DF	CZE	Aleš Matějů
39	FW	ITA	Matteo Stoppa
42	FW	ITA	Samuele Lo Coco (Note: Aggregated from Youth Sector during the season.)
47	FW	ITA	Salvatore Di Mitri (Note: Aggregated from Youth Sector during the season.)
48	DF	ITA	Davide Bettella
54	DF	ITA	Manuel Peretti
77	MF	ITA	Salvatore Elia
79	DF	ITA	Edoardo Lancini

== Transfers ==
=== Summer 2022 ===
In
Date	Pos.	Name	From	Type	Fee	Ref.
16 June 2022	FW	(Italy) Edoardo Soleri	(Italy) Padova	Option to buy exercised	€200,000	
1 July 2022	FW	(Italy) Giuseppe Fella	(Italy) Salernitana	Option to buy exercised	€320.000	
1 July 2022	DF	(Italy) Manuel Peretti	(Italy) Grosseto	End of loan	Free	
1 July 2022	MF	(Italy) Jérémie Broh	(Italy) Südtirol	End of loan	Free	
8 July 2022	MF	(Italy) Samuele Damiani	(Italy) Empoli	Option to buy exercised	€300,000	
17 July 2022	FW	(Italy) Matteo Brunori	(Italy) Juventus	Permanent deal	€2,000,000	
22 July 2022	GK	(Italy) Mirko Pigliacelli	(Romania) Universitatea Craiova	Permanent deal	€500,000	
27 July 2022	DF	(Romania) Ionuț Nedelcearu	(Italy) Crotone	Permanent deal	Undisclosed	
28 July 2022	DF	(Italy) Marco Sala	(Italy) Sassuolo	Loan with an option to buy and counter-option	Free	
28 July 2022	FW	(Italy) Matteo Stoppa	(Italy) Sampdoria	Loan with an option to buy and counter-option	Free	
28 July 2022	MF	(Italy) Salvatore Elia	(Italy) Atalanta	Loan with an option to buy and counter-option	Free	
29 July 2022	DF	(Italy) Edoardo Pierozzi	(Italy) Fiorentina	Loan with an option to buy and counter-option	Free	
5 August 2022	DF	(Serbia) Mladen Devetak	Unattached (Note: Previous club: Vojvodina.)	Permanent deal	Free	
16 August 2022	FW	(Italy) Francesco Di Mariano	(Italy) Lecce	Permanent deal	€1,000,000	
18 August 2022	MF	(Slovenia) Leo Štulac	(Italy) Empoli	Loan with an obligation to buy	Free	
19 August 2022	DF	(Italy) Davide Bettella	(Italy) Monza	Loan with an option to buy	Free	
23 August 2022	MF	(Italy) Jacopo Segre	(Italy) Torino	Permanent deal	Undisclosed	
26 August 2022	DF	(Czech Republic) Aleš Matějů	Unattached (Note: Previous club: Venezia.)	Permanent deal	Free	
30 August 2022	MF	(Bosnia and Herzegovina) Dario Šarić	(Italy) Ascoli	Permanent deal	€1,800,000	
1 September 2022	FW	(Italy) Luca Vido	(Italy) Atalanta	Loan with an option to buy	Free	
1 September 2022	MF	(France) Claudio Gomes	(England) Manchester City	Permanent deal	Undisclosed	
Out
Date	Pos.	Name	To	Type	Fee	Ref.
1 July 2022	GK	(Italy) Alberto Pelagotti	Unattached	Contract expired	Free	
1 July 2022	MF	(Ghana) Moses Odjer	Unattached (Note: Joined Foggia after release.)	Contract expired	Free	
1 July 2022	DF	(Italy) Marco Perrotta	(Italy) Bari	End of loan	Free	
21 July 2022	FW	(Italy) Mattia Felici	(Italy) Lecce	Released	Free	
27 July 2022	DF	(France) Maxime Giron	(Italy) Crotone	Permanent deal	Undisclosed	
27 July 2022	MF	(Italy) Jacopo Dall'Oglio	(Italy) Avellino	Permanent deal	Undisclosed	
29 July 2022	DF	(The Gambia) Bubacarr Marong	(Italy) Gelbison	Loan	Free	
12 August 2022	MF	(Italy) Francesco De Rose	(Italy) Cesena	Permanent deal	Undisclosed	
18 August 2022	MF	(Italy) Gregorio Luperini	(Italy) Perugia	Permanent deal	Undisclosed	
23 August 2022	FW	(Italy) Giacomo Corona	(Italy) Torino	Loan with an option to buy	Free	
26 August 2022	FW	(Italy) Andrea Silipo	(Italy) Juve Stabia	Loan	Free	
31 August 2022	FW	(Italy) Giuseppe Fella	(Italy) Monopoli	Loan	Free	
1 September 2022	DF	(Italy) Michele Somma	Unattached (Note: Joined Catania after release.)	Released	Free	
1 September 2022	FW	(Italy) Matteo Stoppa	(Italy) Sampdoria	Released	Free	

=== Winter 2023 ===
In
Date	Pos.	Name	From	Type	Fee	Ref.
12 January 2023	DF	(Uruguay) Renzo Orihuela	(Uruguay) Montevideo City Torque	Loan	Free	
18 January 2023	FW	(Italy) Gennaro Tutino	(Italy) Parma	Loan with an option to buy and obligation under determined conditions	Free	
27 January 2023	MF	(Italy) Valerio Verre	(Italy) Sampdoria	Loan with an option to buy	Free	
30 January 2023	DF	(Denmark) Simon Graves	(Denmark) Randers FC	Permanent deal	€1,5M	
31 January 2023	DF	(Italy) Edoardo Masciangelo	(Italy) Benevento	Free	Loan	
31 January 2023	DF	(Italy) Giuseppe Aurelio	(Italy) Pontedera	Permanent deal	€250,000	
Out
Date	Pos.	Name	To	Type	Fee	Ref.
3 January 2023	DF	(Italy) Andrea Accardi	(Italy) Piacenza	Permanent deal	Undisclosed	
4 January 2023	DF	(Italy) Manuel Peretti	(Italy) Recanatese	Loan	Free	
4 January 2023	DF	(Serbia) Mladen Devetak	(Italy) Viterbese	Loan	Free	
6 January 2023	DF	(Italy) Roberto Crivello	(Italy) Padova	Loan	Free	
6 January 2023	FW	(Italy) Roberto Floriano	(Italy) Sangiuliano City	Permanent deal	Undisclosed	
13 January 2023	DF	(Italy) Edoardo Pierozzi	(Italy) Fiorentina	End of loan	Free	
17 January 2023	DF	(Albania) Masimiliano Doda	(Italy) Imolese	Loan	Free	

== Pre-season and friendlies ==
Win Draw Loss Fixtures

17 July 2022 Friendly	Oratorio San Ciro e Giorgio	0–12	Palermo	Marineo
18:00 CEST (UTC+2)		Report	Fella 12', 22', 42'; Luperini 34'; Corona 47', 53'; Felici 67', 87'; Somma 71', 80'; Broh 72'; Silipo 76'	Stadium: Comunale di Marineo; Referee: Giorgia Arcoleo

21 July 2022 Friendly	Pisa	5–0	Palermo	Rovetta
18:00 CEST (UTC+2)	Lucca 2' (pen.), 23'; Mastinu 16', 28'; Berra 65'	Report		Stadium: Campo Sportivo Comunale "Marinoni"; Referee: Simone Sozza

23 September 2022 Friendly	Palermo	1–0	Nottingham Forest	Manchester
16:00 CEST (UTC+2)	Soleri 78'	Report		Stadium: Academy Stadium

== Competitions ==
=== Overall record ===
Competition	First match	Last match	Starting round	Final position	Record							
Competition	First match	Last match	Starting round	Final position	Pld	W	D	L	GF	GA	GD	Win %
Serie B	13 August 2022	19 May 2023	Matchday 1	9th	38	11	16	11	48	49	−1	28.95
Coppa Italia	31 July 2022	6 August 2022	Preliminary round	Round of 64	2	1	0	1	3	5	−2	50.00
Total					40	12	16	12	51	54	−3	30.00

Source: Palermo F.C.

=== Serie B ===
==== League table ====
Pos	Team	Pld	W	D	L	GF	GA	GD	Pts	Promotion, qualification or relegation
7	Reggina (Note: Reggina were deducted five points for failing to pay taxes and player salaries on time. The deduction was initially seven points; later relegated to Serie D after enduring serious financial difficulties for several years. Brescia was readmitted into Serie B.) (E)	38	17	4	17	49	45	+4	50	Revival in Serie D
8	Venezia	38	13	10	15	51	50	+1	49	Qualification for promotion play-offs preliminary round
9	Palermo	38	11	16	11	48	49	−1	49	
10	Modena	38	13	9	16	47	53	−6	48	
11	Pisa	38	11	14	13	48	42	+6	47 (Note: Head-to-head points: Pisa 5, Ascoli 5, Como 4. Head-to-head goal difference: Pisa +1, Ascoli −1.)	

Source: Soccerway (in English)
Rules for classification: 1) Points; 2) Head-to-head points; 3) Head-to-head goal difference; 4) Goal difference; 5) Goals scored; 6) Draw.
(E) Eliminated

==== Results summary ====
Overall								Home						Away					
Pld	W	D	L	GF	GA	GD	Pts	W	D	L	GF	GA	GD	W	D	L	GF	GA	GD
38	11	16	11	48	49	−1	49	8	8	3	25	17	+8	3	8	8	23	32	−9

Last updated: complete.
Source: Soccerway

==== Results by round ====
Round	1	2	3	4	5	6	7	8	9	10	11	12	13	14	15	16	17	18	19	20	21	22	23	24	25	26	27	28	29	30	31	32	33	34	35	36	37	38
Ground	H	A	H	A	H	A	H	A	H	H	A	H	A	H	A	H	A	H	A	A	H	A	H	A	H	A	H	A	A	H	A	H	A	H	A	H	A	H
Result	W	D	L	L	W	L	L	L	D	D	W	W	L	L	W	D	D	W	D	D	W	W	W	L	D	D	D	D	D	W	L	D	L	D	D	W	L	D
Position	2	3	9	13	12	14	16	17	17	18	14	13	13	16	14	13	14	11	13	12	11	9	6	10	9	9	9	9	9	8	9	9	10	9	11	7	8	9

Source: WorldFootball.net
A = Away; H = Home; W = Win; D = Draw; L = Loss

==== Matches ====
The league fixtures were announced on 15 July 2022.

13 August 2022 1	Palermo	2–0	Perugia	Palermo
20:45 CEST (UTC+2)	Brunori 25' (pen.); Floriano (yellow card) 32'; Elia 68'; Nedelcearu (yellow card) 81'	Report	Iannoni (yellow card) 4'; Dell'Orco (yellow card) 12'; Lisi (red card) 23'; Vulić (yellow card) 34'; Kouan (yellow card) 52'; Curado (yellow card) 56'	Stadium: Renzo Barbera; Attendance: 21,835; Referee: Giovanni Ayroldi

19 August 2022 2	Bari	1–1	Palermo	Bari
20:45 CEST (UTC+2)	Maita (yellow card) 24'; Cheddira 68'; Di Cesare (yellow card) 77'	Report	Buttaro (yellow card) 18'; Valente 37', (yellow card) 50'; Marconi (red card) 87'	Stadium: San Nicola; Attendance: 35,377; Referee: Giacomo Camplone

27 August 2022 3	Palermo	2–3	Ascoli	Palermo
20:45 CEST (UTC+2)	Crivello (yellow card) 32'; Brunori 36'; Valente (yellow card) 60' (yellow-red card) 89'; Segre 63'	Report	Gondo 27', 45+5', 52', (yellow card) 45+3'; Donati (yellow card) 76'; Leali (yellow card) 82'	Stadium: Renzo Barbera; Attendance: 22,163; Referee: Daniele Minelli

3 September 2022 4	Reggina	3–0	Palermo	Reggio Calabria
14:00 CEST (UTC+2)	Fabbian 7'; Pierozzi (yellow card) 19'; Di Chiara (yellow card) 29'; Canotto (yellow card) 39'; Ménez 58'; Cionek (red card) 63'; Liotti 73'	Report	Bettella (yellow card) 66' (yellow-red card) 84'	Stadium: Oreste Granillo; Attendance: 13,013; Referee: Luca Massimi

9 September 2022 5	Palermo	1–0	Genoa	Palermo
20:30 CEST (UTC+2)	Matějů (yellow card) 21'; Brunori (yellow card) 28', (goal) 49'; Štulac (yellow card) 56'	Report	Pajač (yellow card) 44'; Jagiełło (yellow card) 52'; Badelj (yellow card) 64'; Galdames (yellow card) 81'	Stadium: Renzo Barbera; Attendance: 23,643; Referee: Francesco Cosso

17 September 2022 6	Frosinone	1–0	Palermo	Frosinone
14:00 CEST (UTC+2)	Boloca (yellow card) 9'; Buttaro 44' (o.g.); Cotali (yellow card) 80'; Mulattieri (yellow card) 90'; Caso (yellow card) 90+4'	Report	Marconi (yellow card) 38'; Matějů (yellow card) 47'; Bettella (yellow card) 53'; Segre (yellow card) 89'	Stadium: Benito Stirpe; Attendance: 10,406; Referee: Antonio Giua

1 October 2022 7	Palermo	0–1	Südtirol	Palermo
14:00 CEST (UTC+2)	Buttaro (yellow card) 17'; Di Mariano (yellow card) 22'; Marconi (yellow card) 37'; Vido (yellow card) 88'	Report	Masiello (yellow card) 14'; Odogwu 20'; Tait (yellow card) 37'; Berra (yellow card) 45+1'; Carretta (yellow card) 87'; D'Orazio (yellow card) 88'	Stadium: Renzo Barbera; Attendance: 16,726; Referee: Daniele Paterna

8 October 2022 8	Ternana	3–0	Palermo	Terni
14:00 CEST (UTC+2)	Cassata (yellow card) 44'; Partipilo 57'; Palumbo 77'; Moro 90+1', (yellow card) 90+2'	Report	Segre (yellow card) 19'; Broh (yellow card) 88'; Marconi (yellow card) 90+4'	Stadium: Libero Liberati; Attendance: 6,617; Referee: Gianluca Manganiello

15 October 2022 9	Palermo	3–3	Pisa	Palermo
14:00 CEST (UTC+2)	Di Mariano 11'; Marconi (yellow card) 17'; Elia 45+2', 57', (yellow card) 62'; Bettella (yellow card) 48'; Brunori (yellow card) 60'; Nedelcearu (yellow card) 87'	Report	Beruatto (yellow card) 10'; Touré 25'; Calabresi (yellow card) 51'; Marin (yellow card) 60'; Gliozzi 64'; Tramoni 78'; Sibilli (yellow card) 79'	Stadium: Renzo Barbera; Attendance: 16,101; Referee: Ermanno Feliciani

23 October 2022 10	Palermo	0–0	Cittadella	Palermo
16:15 CEST (UTC+2)	Elia (yellow card) 10'; Gomes (yellow card) 29'	Report	Cassandro (yellow card) 5'; Tounkara (yellow card) 69'; Pavan (yellow card) 72'; Perticone (yellow card) 78'	Stadium: Renzo Barbera; Attendance: 18,029; Referee: Antonio Giua

29 October 2022 11	Modena	0–2	Palermo	Modena
14:00 CEST (UTC+2)	Magnino (yellow card) 7'; Azzi (yellow card) 53'; Pergreffi (yellow card) 83'; Mosti (yellow card) 90+4'	Report	Brunori 9' (pen.); Devetak (yellow card) 14'; Valente 45+2'	Stadium: Alberto Braglia; Attendance: 11,350; Referee: Francesco Fourneau

5 November 2022 12	Palermo	1–0	Parma	Palermo
16:15 CET (UTC+1)	Nedelcearu (yellow card) 45'; Marconi 57'	Report	Sohm (yellow card) 26'; Oosterwolde (yellow card) 59'	Stadium: Renzo Barbera; Attendance: 15,720; Referee: Lorenzo Maggioni

12 November 2022 13	Cosenza	3–2	Palermo	Cosenza
14:00 CET (UTC+1)	Florenzi 45+1', (yellow card) 50'; Martino (yellow card) 49'; Rigione 56', (yellow card) 89'; Calò (yellow card) 60'; Larrivey 63'; Vallocchia (red card) 89'	Report	Matějů (yellow card) 11'; Devetak (yellow card) 17'; Brunori 41', 59', (penalty missed) 90'; Marconi (yellow card) 53'	Stadium: San Vito-Gigi Marulla; Attendance: 4,149; Referee: Matteo Gualtieri

27 November 2022 14	Palermo	0–1	Venezia	Palermo
18:00 CET (UTC+1)	Brunori (penalty missed) 69'	Report	Tessmann (yellow card) 37'; Pohjanpalo 65'; Novakovich (yellow card) 87'	Stadium: Renzo Barbera; Attendance: 14,961; Referee: Gianluca Manganiello

4 December 2022 15	Benevento	0–1	Palermo	Benevento
18:00 CET (UTC+1)	Viviani (yellow card) 50'; Kubica (yellow card) 88'; Tello (yellow card) 90+6'	Report	Gomes (yellow card) 50'; Brunori 54'; Broh (yellow card) 78'	Stadium: Ciro Vigorito; Attendance: 7,884; Referee: Niccolò Baroni

8 December 2022 16	Palermo	0–0	Como	Palermo
20:30 CET (UTC+1)		Report	Mancuso (yellow card) 45'; Arrigoni (yellow card) 58'	Stadium: Renzo Barbera; Attendance: 16,467; Referee: Federico Dionisi

11 December 2022 17	SPAL	1–1	Palermo	Ferrara
15:00 CET (UTC+1)	Meccariello 27'; Peda (yellow card) 45'; Esposito (yellow card) 39'; Rabbi (yellow card) 45'	Report	Nedelcearu (yellow card) 4'; Brunori 32', (yellow card) 40'; Di Mariano (yellow card) 42'; Gomes (yellow card) 60'; Segre (yellow card) 63'	Stadium: Paolo Mazza; Attendance: 7,441; Referee: Marco Di Bello

18 December 2022 18	Palermo	2–1	Cagliari	Palermo
18:00 CET (UTC+1)	Brunori 37' (pen.); Nedelcearu (yellow card) 45+4'; Segre 53'; Gomes (yellow card) 66'; Di Mariano (yellow card) 74'	Report	Altare (yellow card) 31'; Aresti (yellow card) 45+5'; Capradossi (yellow card) 59'; Dossena (yellow card) 73'; Pavoletti 90+5'; Luvumbo (yellow card) 90+8'	Stadium: Renzo Barbera; Attendance: 16,812; Referee: Fabio Maresca

26 December 2022 19	Brescia	1–1	Palermo	Brescia
12:30 CET (UTC+1)	Galazzi 50'; Bisoli (yellow card) 70'; Moreo (yellow card) 80'	Report	Brunori (yellow card) 45'; Segre 52'	Stadium: Mario Rigamonti; Attendance: 4,856; Referee: Livio Martinelli

14 January 2023 20	Perugia	3–3	Palermo	Perugia
14:00 CET (UTC+1)	Di Serio 2', (yellow card) 3'; Casasola 7' (pen.); Lisi (yellow card) 27'; Olivieri 36'; Santoro (yellow card) 41'; Curado (yellow card) 59'	Report	Marconi 23'; Valente 48'; Segre (yellow card) 62'; Broh (yellow card) 74'; Brunori 89'	Stadium: Renato Curi; Attendance: 6,520; Referee: Matteo Marcenaro

20 January 2023 21	Palermo	1–0	Bari	Palermo
20:30 CET (UTC+1)	Damiani (yellow card) 44'; Šarić (yellow card) 53'; Marconi 81'; Sala (yellow card) 86'; Nedelcearu (yellow card) 90+6'	Report	Maita (yellow card) 24'; Mazzotta (yellow card) 81'; Cheddira (yellow card) 86' (yellow-red card) 89'; Benedetti (yellow card) 90+3'	Stadium: Renzo Barbera; Attendance: 15,747; Referee: Luca Massimi

29 January 2023 22	Ascoli	1–2	Palermo	Ascoli Piceno
14:00 CET (UTC+1)	Forte 64'	Report	Brunori 15', (penalty missed) 71', 82'; Matějů (yellow card) 56'; Nedelcearu (yellow card) 66'	Stadium: Cino e Lillo Del Duca; Attendance: 6,539; Referee: Ermanno Feliciani
Note: Match was initially scheduled for 28 January 2023 at 14:00 CET (UTC+1), but on 27 January 2023 it was postponed because Palermo's flight stopped due to a plane window break, which forced to an emergency landing.

5 February 2023 23	Palermo	2–1	Reggina	Palermo
16:15 CET (UTC+1)	Brunori 47' (pen.); Verre (yellow card) 56'; Soleri 81', (yellow card) 82'; Tutino (penalty missed) 90+3'; Sala (yellow card) 90+8'	Report	Majer (yellow card) 3' (yellow-red card) 90'; Di Chiara (yellow card) 69'; Marconi 76' (o.g.); Bouah (yellow card) 88'; Gagliolo (yellow card) 90+2'	Stadium: Renzo Barbera; Attendance: 26,164; Referee: Daniele Minelli

10 February 2023 24	Genoa	2–0	Palermo	Genoa
20:30 CET (UTC+1)	Guðmundsson 25'; Sabelli (yellow card) 31'; Hefti (yellow card) 41'; Jagiełło 90+6'	Report	Segre (yellow card) 75'; Matějů (yellow card) 84'; Nedelcearu (yellow card) 90+4'	Stadium: Luigi Ferraris; Attendance: 25,185; Referee: Livio Marinelli

18 February 2023 25	Palermo	1–1	Frosinone	Palermo
14:00 CET (UTC+1)	Verre 37'	Report	Mazzitelli (yellow card) 21'; Caso (yellow card) 55'; Boloca 75'	Stadium: Renzo Barbera; Attendance: 27,846; Referee: Davide Ghersini

25 February 2023 26	Südtirol	1–1	Palermo	Bolzano
14:00 CET (UTC+1)	Cissé 5', (yellow card) 88'; Masiello (yellow card) 65'	Report	Šarić (yellow card) 14'; Masciangelo (yellow card) 32'; Soleri 48'; Marconi (yellow card) 81'	Stadium: Druso; Attendance: 5,143; Referee: Francesco Fourneau

28 February 2023 27	Palermo	0–0	Ternana	Palermo
20:30 CET (UTC+1)	Aurelio (yellow card) 59'; Gomes (yellow card) 90+1'	Report	Corrado (yellow card) 53'	Stadium: Renzo Barbera; Attendance: 16,862; Referee: Gianpiero Miele

4 March 2023 28	Pisa	1–1	Palermo	Pisa
14:00 CET (UTC+1)	Mastinu (yellow card) 9'; Caracciolo (yellow card) 14'; Esteves (yellow card) 30'; Sibilli 38'	Report	Brunori (penalty missed) 32'; Di Mariano 38'; Soleri (yellow card) 44'; Bettella (yellow card) 90'; Verre (yellow card) 90'	Stadium: Arena Garibaldi; Attendance: 9,407; Referee: Ivano Pezzuto

11 March 2023 29	Cittadella	3–3	Palermo	Cittadella
14:00 CET (UTC+1)	Maistrello 3', 74'; Antonucci 23' (pen.); Carriero (yellow card) 35'; Branca (yellow card) 39' (yellow-red card) 85'; Giraudo (yellow card) 90+3'	Report	Di Mariano 33' (pen.), 64'; Šarić (yellow card) 37'; Brunori 45+2'; Verre (yellow card) 35'	Stadium: Piercesare Tombolato; Attendance: 4,594; Referee: Luca Massimi

17 March 2023 30	Palermo	5–2	Modena	Palermo
20:30 CET (UTC+1)	Tutino 25'; Soleri 47'; Verre 56'; Aurelio 59'; Šarić (yellow card) 68'; Vido 79' (pen.); Matějů (yellow card) 88'	Report	Strizzolo 4', 30', (yellow card) 90+2'	Stadium: Renzo Barbera; Attendance: 22,513; Referee: Daniele Minelli

1 April 2023 31	Parma	2–1	Palermo	Parma
14:00 CEST (UTC+2)	Benedyczak 32'; Bernabé (yellow card) 53'; Coulibaly 77'; Vázquez (yellow card) 78'	Report	Gomes (yellow card) 29'; Soleri 41'	Stadium: Ennio Tardini; Attendance: 14,839; Referee: Luca Massimi

10 April 2023 32	Palermo	0–0	Cosenza	Palermo
20:30 CEST (UTC+2)	Marconi (yellow card) 25'; Matějů (yellow card) 66'; Valente (yellow card) 80'; Gomes (yellow card) 89'	Report	Brescianini (yellow card) 19'; Finotto (yellow card) 60'; Florenzi (yellow card) 61'	Stadium: Renzo Barbera; Attendance: 21,110; Referee: Juan Luca Sacchi

15 April 2023 33	Venezia	3–2	Palermo	Venice
14:00 CEST (UTC+2)	Johnsen 19'; Pohjanpalo 61' (pen.); Tessmann 63'	Report	Brunori 5'; Soleri (yellow card) 35'; Nedelcearu (yellow card) 58'; Tutino 86' (pen.)	Stadium: Pier Luigi Penzo; Attendance: 5,911; Referee: Matteo Gariglio

22 April 2023 34	Palermo	1–1	Benevento	Palermo
16:15 CEST (UTC+2)	Sala 11'; Segre (yellow card) 71'	Report	Farias 28'; Acampora (yellow card) 62'; Veseli (yellow card) 77'; Toșca (yellow card) 89'	Stadium: Renzo Barbera; Attendance: 21,531; Referee: Lorenzo Maggioni

1 May 2023 35	Como	1–1	Palermo	Como
12:30 CEST (UTC+2)	Cerri 32' (pen.); Parigini (yellow card) 74'; Bellemo (yellow card) 90+3'	Report	Buttaro 17'; Sala (yellow card) 74'	Stadium: Giuseppe Sinigaglia; Attendance: 6,416; Referee: Daniele Paterna

6 May 2023 36	Palermo	2–1	SPAL	Palermo
16:15 CEST (UTC+2)	Meccariello 29' (o.g.); Brunori 35', (yellow card) 37'; Marconi (yellow card) 50'	Report	Varnier 66'; Rauti (yellow card) 79'; Puletto (yellow card) 90+1'	Stadium: Renzo Barbera; Attendance: 20,918; Referee: Michael Fabbri

13 May 2023 37	Cagliari	2–1	Palermo	Cagliari
14:00 CEST (UTC+2)	Zappa (yellow card) 21'; Nández 24'; Dossena (yellow card) 50'; Deiola 64'; Lella (yellow card) 90'	Report	Segre 16'; Matěj (yellow card) 42'; Marconi (yellow card) 51' (yellow-red card) 56'	Stadium: Unipol Domus; Attendance: 15,502; Referee: Paolo Valeri

19 May 2023 38	Palermo	2–2	Brescia	Palermo
20:30 CEST (UTC+2)	Brunori 4'; Tutino 40', (yellow card) 42'; Sala (yellow card) 66'	Report	Rodríguez 54'; Ayé 56'; Andrenacci (yellow card) 81'; Listkowski	Stadium: Renzo Barbera; Attendance: 32,235; Referee: Fabio Maresca

=== Coppa Italia ===
31 July 2022 Preliminary round	Palermo	3–2	Reggiana	Palermo
21:00 CEST (UTC+2)	Brunori 3', 37', 80' (pen.); Soleri (yellow card) 74'	Report	Rosafio (yellow card) 19', (goal) 57' (pen.); Sorrentino (yellow card) 30'; Laezza (yellow card) 60'; D'Angelo 87', (yellow card) 88'	Stadium: Renzo Barbera; Attendance: 13,297; Referee: Daniele Rutella

6 August 2022 Round of 64	Torino	3–0	Palermo	Turin
21:15 CEST (UTC+2)	Lukić 54'; Radonjić 74', (yellow card) 76'; Pellegri 79'	Report		Stadium: Olimpico Grande Torino; Attendance: 6,803; Referee: Davide Ghersini

== Statistics ==
=== Appearances, goals and assists ===
As of 19 May 2023

No.	Pos.	Name	Serie B			Coppa Italia			Total		
No.	Pos.	Name	AP	GO	AS	AP	GO	AS	AP	GO	AS
1	GK	(Italy) Giovanni Grotta	0	0	0	0	0	0	0	0	0
2	DF	(Denmark) Simon Graves	5	0	0	0	0	0	5	0	0
2	DF	(Italy) Edoardo Pierozzi	2	0	0	0	0	0	2	0	0
3	DF	(Italy) Marco Sala	26	1	1	1	0	0	27	1	1
4	DF	(Italy) Andrea Accardi	0	0	0	0	0	0	0	0	0
4	DF	(Uruguay) Renzo Orihuela	1	0	0	0	0	0	1	0	0
5	MF	(France) Claudio Gomes	26	0	1	0	0	0	26	0	1
5	DF	(Italy) Michele Somma	0	0	0	1	0	0	1	0	0
6	DF	(Italy) Roberto Crivello	6	0	0	2	0	0	8	0	0
7	FW	(Italy) Roberto Floriano	12	0	1	2	0	0	14	0	1
7	FW	(Italy) Gennaro Tutino	18	3	1	0	0	0	18	3	1
8	MF	(Italy) Jacopo Segre	34	4	0	0	0	0	34	4	0
9	FW	(Italy) Matteo Brunori	36	17	4	2	3	0	38	20	4
10	FW	(Italy) Francesco Di Mariano	27	4	3	0	0	0	27	4	3
10	FW	(Italy) Andrea Silipo	0	0	0	2	0	0	2	0	0
11	FW	(Italy) Giuseppe Fella	0	0	0	1	0	0	1	0	0
11	DF	(Italy) Edoardo Masciangelo	4	0	0	0	0	0	4	0	0
12	GK	(Italy) Samuele Massolo	0	0	0	0	0	0	0	0	0
14	MF	(Italy) Jérémie Broh	30	0	0	2	0	0	32	0	0
15	DF	(Italy) Ivan Marconi	29	3	1	2	0	0	31	3	1
16	MF	(Slovenia) Leo Štulac	11	0	2	0	0	0	11	0	2
17	MF	(Italy) Gregorio Luperini	0	0	0	0	0	0	0	0	0
18	DF	(Romania) Ionuț Nedelcearu	36	0	3	1	0	0	37	0	3
19	FW	(Italy) Luca Vido	25	1	0	0	0	0	25	1	0
20	MF	(Italy) Francesco De Rose	0	0	0	2	0	0	2	0	0
21	MF	(Italy) Samuele Damiani	27	0	1	2	0	0	29	0	1
22	GK	(Italy) Mirko Pigliacelli	38	0	0	2	0	0	40	0	0
23	DF	(Albania) Masimiliano Doda	0	0	0	1	0	0	1	0	0
25	DF	(Italy) Alessio Buttaro	17	1	0	2	0	0	19	1	0
26	MF	(Italy) Valerio Verre	14	2	2	0	0	0	14	2	2
27	FW	(Italy) Edoardo Soleri	29	4	2	2	0	0	31	4	2
28	MF	(Bosnia and Herzegovina) Dario Šarić	28	0	1	0	0	0	28	0	1
30	MF	(Italy) Nicola Valente	32	3	6	1	0	2	33	3	8
31	DF	(Italy) Giuseppe Aurelio	9	1	0	0	0	0	9	1	0
31	FW	(Italy) Giacomo Corona	0	0	0	0	0	0	0	0	0
34	DF	(Serbia) Mladen Devetak	6	0	0	0	0	0	6	0	0
37	DF	(Czech Republic) Aleš Matějů	33	0	2	0	0	0	33	0	2
39	FW	(Italy) Matteo Stoppa	3	0	0	1	0	0	4	0	0
42	FW	(Italy) Samuele Lo Coco	0	0	0	0	0	0	0	0	0
47	FW	(Italy) Salvatore Di Mitri	0	0	0	0	0	0	0	0	0
48	DF	(Italy) Davide Bettella	19	0	0	0	0	0	19	0	0
54	DF	(Italy) Manuel Peretti	0	0	0	0	0	0	0	0	0
77	MF	(Italy) Salvatore Elia	10	3	0	1	0	0	11	3	0
79	DF	(Italy) Edoardo Lancini	3	0	0	1	0	0	4	0	0
Own goals			—	1	—		0	—		1	—
Totals			—	48	31	—	3	2	—	51	33

=== Disciplinary record ===
As of 19 May 2023

No.	Pos.	Name	Serie B			Coppa Italia			Total		
No.	Pos.	Name	Yellow card	(yellow card) (yellow-red card)	Red card	Yellow card	(yellow card) (yellow-red card)	Red card	Yellow card	(yellow card) (yellow-red card)	Red card
3	DF	(Italy) Marco Sala	4	0	0	0	0	0	4	0	0
5	MF	(France) Claudio Gomes	7	0	0	0	0	0	7	0	0
6	DF	(Italy) Roberto Crivello	1	0	0	0	0	0	1	0	0
7	FW	(Italy) Roberto Floriano	1	0	0	0	0	0	1	0	0
7	FW	(Italy) Gennaro Tutino	1	0	0	0	0	0	1	0	0
8	MF	(Italy) Jacopo Segre	6	0	0	0	0	0	6	0	0
9	FW	(Italy) Matteo Brunori	5	0	0	0	0	0	5	0	0
10	FW	(Italy) Francesco Di Mariano	3	0	0	0	0	0	3	0	0
11	DF	(Italy) Edoardo Masciangelo	1	0	0	0	0	0	1	0	0
14	MF	(Italy) Jérémie Broh	3	0	0	0	0	0	3	0	0
15	DF	(Italy) Ivan Marconi	8	1	1	0	0	0	8	0	1
16	MF	(Slovenia) Leo Štulac	1	0	0	0	0	0	1	0	0
18	DF	(Romania) Ionuț Nedelcearu	9	0	0	0	0	0	9	0	0
19	FW	(Italy) Luca Vido	1	0	0	0	0	0	1	0	0
21	MF	(Italy) Samuele Damiani	1	0	0	0	0	0	1	0	0
25	DF	(Italy) Alessio Buttaro	2	0	0	0	0	0	2	0	0
26	MF	(Italy) Valerio Verre	3	0	0	0	0	0	3	0	0
27	FW	(Italy) Edoardo Soleri	3	0	0	1	0	0	4	0	0
28	MF	(Bosnia and Herzegovina) Dario Šarić	4	0	0	0	0	0	4	0	0
30	FW	(Italy) Nicola Valente	2	1	0	0	0	0	2	1	0
31	DF	(Italy) Giuseppe Aurelio	1	0	0	0	0	0	1	0	0
34	DF	(Serbia) Mladen Devetak	2	0	0	0	0	0	2	0	0
37	DF	(Czech Republic) Aleš Matějů	8	0	0	0	0	0	8	0	0
48	DF	(Italy) Davide Bettella	3	1	0	0	0	0	3	1	0
77	MF	(Italy) Salvatore Elia	2	0	0	0	0	0	2	0	0
Totals			82	3	1	1	0	0	83	3	1

=== Goals conceded and clean sheets ===
As of 19 May 2023

No.	Pos.	Name	Serie B		Coppa Italia		Total	
No.	Pos.	Name	GC	CS	GC	CS	GC	CS
22	GK	(Italy) Mirko Pigliacelli	49	10	5	0	54	10

=== Attendances ===
As of 19 May 2023

	Matches	Attendances	Average	Highest	Lowest
Serie B	19	387,383	20,389	32,235	14,961
Coppa Italia	1	13,297			
Totals	20	400,680	20,034	32,235	13,297
