= Claudio Gomes =

French footballer (born 2000)

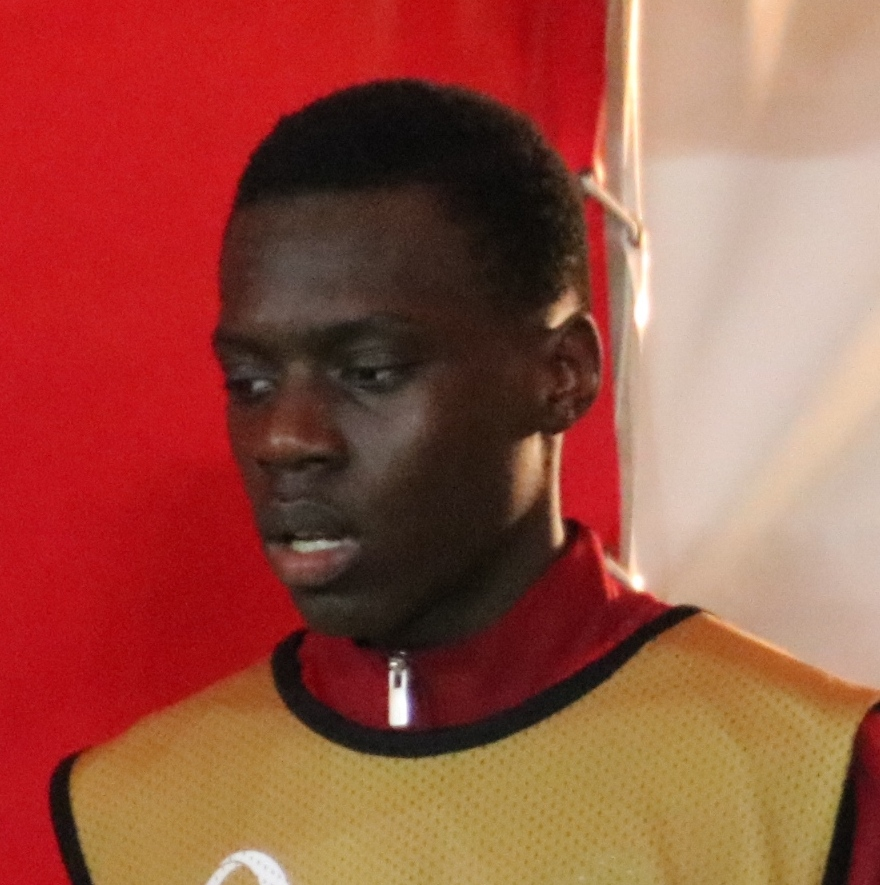
- Gomes with Paris Saint-Germain Academy in 2017

Personal information
- Full name: Claudio Amarildo Gomes
- Date of birth: 23 July 2000 (age 26)
- Place of birth: Argenteuil, Val-d'Oise, France
- Height: 1.80 m (5 ft 11 in)
- Position: Defensive midfielder

Team information
- Current team: Palermo
- Number: 6

Youth career
- 2006–2010: ASC Val d'Argenteuil
- 2010–2011: RFC Argenteuil
- 2011–2013: Évreux
- 2013–2017: Paris Saint-Germain

Senior career*
Years	Team	Apps	(Gls)
2017–2018	Paris Saint-Germain B	1	(0)
2018–2022	Manchester City	0	(0)
2019–2020	→ Jong PSV (loan)	21	(0)
2021–2022	→ Barnsley (loan)	31	(1)
2022–	Palermo	119	(3)

International career
2015–2016	France U16	13	(0)
2016–2017	France U17	16	(0)
2017	France U18	7	(1)
2018–2019	France U19	12	(0)
2019	France U20	2	(0)
- * Club domestic league appearances and goals as of 12 May 2026

Claudio Amarildo Gomes (born 23 July 2000) is a French professional footballer who plays as a defensive midfielder for Serie B club Palermo.

Having spent the majority of his youth career at Paris Saint-Germain, where he made one reserve team appearance in the Championnat National 2 in 2017, he joined Manchester City the following year. He played three senior games for City, winning the FA Community Shield in 2018 on his debut, and was loaned to Jong PSV and Barnsley in the Dutch and English second tiers before transferring to Palermo in 2022.

Gomes represented France from under-16 to under-20 level, earning 50 caps from 2015 to 2019.

== Club career ==
=== Early career ===
Gomes played as a youth for ASC Val d'Argenteuil and RFC Argenteuil, two teams in his hometown, before joining Évreux in 2011 and Paris Saint-Germain two years later.

Gomes made his senior debut for PSG's reserves on 18 November 2017, his one appearance for the club. He came on as a 79th-minute substitute for Abdallah Yaisien in a 2–1 home loss to Yzeure in the Championnat National 2 (fourth tier).

=== Manchester City ===
On 25 July 2018, Gomes signed with Manchester City. He had trained with the club since the expiry of his PSG contract in June, and been on their pre-season tour of the United States, but they were forced to wait for him to turn 18 before signing him. He made his professional debut on 5 August in a 2–0 win over Chelsea in the 2018 FA Community Shield at Wembley Stadium, coming on in added time for John Stones. He was in the game for one second before the final whistle blew and his team won the trophy.

After making one further appearance for Manchester City in the EFL Cup, Gomes joined PSV Eindhoven on loan for the 2019–20 season, joining up with the Jong PSV squad.

Gomes was back at Manchester City for the 2020–21 season. On 10 February 2021, he made his FA Cup debut as a substitute for the injured Rodri in a 3–1 away win over Championship side Swansea City.

On 31 August 2021, Gomes joined Barnsley in the EFL Championship on loan for the season. He played 32 total games, scoring once to open a 1–1 draw at Swansea City on 15 April 2022. After the Reds were relegated to EFL League One, the loans of Gomes, Domingos Quina and Amine Bassi were terminated on 26 April.

=== Palermo ===
On 1 September 2022, Gomes signed a two-year contract with by Italian club Palermo. He was the first player to join from Manchester City after Palermo had been taken over by the City Football Group. He made his Serie B debut eight days later as a late substitute for Leo Štulac in a 1–0 home win over Genoa.

== International career ==
Gomes was a youth international for France, having captained the France U17s at the 2017 UEFA European Under-17 Championship, and the 2017 FIFA U-17 World Cup. He was named in the team of the tournament at the former in Croatia, in which the French reached the quarter-finals. In France's opening match at the latter tournament in India, he scored in a 7–1 win over New Caledonia.

In August 2018, Gomes was called up for the first time to the under-19 team for friendlies against Slovenia, Croatia and India. He was selected for the 2019 UEFA European Under-19 Championship in Armenia.

== Style of play ==
Gomes is nicknamed "N'Golo Kanté" by his teammates, who liken him to the French international midfielder for his efforts in recovering the ball.

== Personal life ==
Gomes is the son of Bissau-Guinean footballer Amarildo Gomes, who was developing at Beauvais and Rennes before retiring through a knee injury. His brother Ylan Gomes is also a professional footballer. A 2016 profile of Gomes by Le Parisien noted his passion for history, particularly the French Revolution.

== Career statistics ==
As of match played 14 February 2026

Appearances and goals by club, season and competition
Club	Season	League			National cup		League cup		Europe		Other		Total	
Club	Season	Division	Apps	Goals	Apps	Goals	Apps	Goals	Apps	Goals	Apps	Goals	Apps	Goals
Paris Saint-Germain B	2017–18	National 2	1	0	—		—		—		—		1	0
Manchester City U23	2019–20	—	—		—		—		—		2 (Note: Appearances in EFL Trophy)	0	2	0
Manchester City U23	2020–21	—	—		—		—		—		2	0	2	0
Manchester City U23	Total		0	0	0	0	0	0	0	0	4	0	4	0
Manchester City	2018–19	Premier League	0	0	0	0	1	0	0	0	1 (Note: Appearance in FA Community Shield)	0	2	0
Manchester City	2020–21	Premier League	0	0	1	0	0	0	0	0	0	0	1	0
Manchester City	Total		0	0	1	0	1	0	0	0	1	0	3	0
Jong PSV (loan)	2019–20	Eerste Divisie	21	0	—		—		—		—		21	0
Barnsley (loan)	2021–22	EFL Championship	31	1	1	0	0	0	—		—		32	1
Palermo	2022–23	Serie B	26	0	0	0	—		—		—		26	0
Palermo	2023–24	Serie B	34	0	1	0	—		—		2 (Note: Appearance(s) in Serie B – Promotion play-offs)	0	37	0
Palermo	2024–25	Serie B	32	2	2	0	—		—		1	0	35	2
Palermo	2025–26	Serie B	21	1	1	0	—		—		—		22	1
Palermo	Total		113	3	4	0	0	0	0	0	3	0	120	3
Career total			166	4	6	0	1	0	0	0	8	0	181	4

== Honours ==
Manchester City

- FA Community Shield: 2018

Individual

- UEFA European Under-17 Championship Team of the Tournament: 2017
