= Samuele Damiani =

Italian football player (born 1998)

Personal information
- Date of birth: 30 January 1998 (age 28)
- Place of birth: Poggibonsi, Italy
- Height: 1.70 m (5 ft 7 in)
- Position: Midfielder

Team information
- Current team: Ascoli
- Number: 4

Youth career
- –2017: Empoli

Senior career*
Years	Team	Apps	(Gls)
2017–2022	Empoli	19	(0)
2017–2018	→ Lucchese (loan)	25	(0)
2018–2019	→ Viterbese (loan)	27	(1)
2019–2020	→ Carrarese (loan)	26	(0)
2022	→ Palermo (loan)	21	(1)
2022–2025	Palermo	27	(0)
2023–2024	→ Juventus Next Gen (loan)	25	(4)
2024–2025	→ Ternana (loan)	8	(0)
2025	Ternana	0	(0)
2025–	Ascoli	33	(2)

International career
2020	Italy U-18	3	(0)
- * Club domestic league appearances and goals as of 30 April 2026

Samuele Damiani (born 30 January 1998) is an Italian professional footballer who plays as a midfielder for Serie B club Ascoli.

== Club career ==
He made his Serie C debut for Lucchese on 3 September 2017 in a game against Pontedera.

On 21 August 2019, he joined Carrarese on loan.

On 21 January 2022, he moved on loan to Palermo. On 8 July 2022, Damiani returned to Palermo permanently and signed a four-year contract.

On 1 September 2023, Damiani was loaned out to Serie C club Juventus Next Gen until the end of the season.

On 8 August 2024, Palermo announced the loan of Damiani to Serie C club Ternana, with an obligation to buy.

== Career statistics ==
=== Club ===
As of 1 September 2022

Appearances and goals by club, season and competition
Club	Season	League			National cup		Other		Total	
Club	Season	Division	Apps	Goals	Apps	Goals	Apps	Goals	Apps	Goals
Empoli	2020–21	Serie B	19	0	3	0	—		22	0
Empoli	2021–22	Serie A	0	0	0	0	—		0	0
Empoli	Total		19	0	3	0	0	0	22	0
Lucchese (loan)	2017–18	Serie C	25	0	0	0	0	0	25	0
Viterbese (loan)	2018–19	Serie C	27	1	3+5	0	2 (Note: All appearance(s) in promotion play-offs.)	0	37	1
Carrarese (loan)	2019–20	Serie C	26	0	1	0	2	0	29	0
Palermo (loan)	2021–22	Serie C	15	1	0	0	6	0	21	1
Palermo	2022–23	Serie B	3	0	2	0	—		5	0
Career total			115	2	14	0	10	0	139	2
