= Alessio Buttaro =

Italian football player (born 2002)

Personal information
- Date of birth: 10 September 2002 (age 24)
- Place of birth: Rome, Italy
- Height: 1.83 m (6 ft 0 in)
- Position: Defender

Team information
- Current team: Forte Virtus (on loan from Palermo)

Youth career
- –2021: Roma

Senior career*
Years	Team	Apps	(Gls)
2021–	Palermo	52	(2)
2025–2026	→ Foggia (loan)	29	(0)
2026–	→ Forte Virtus (loan)	0	(0)
- * Club domestic league appearances and goals as of 1 May 2026

Alessio Buttaro (born 10 September 2002) is an Italian professional footballer who plays as a defender for Forte Virtus, on loan from Serie B club Palermo.

== Club career ==
A Roma youth product, Buttaro was signed permanently by Serie C club Palermo on 14 July 2021, with a buy-back option in favour of the Giallorossi.

Originally a centre defender, Buttaro switched to a right back position by the end of the 2021–22 Serie C season under head coach Silvio Baldini, being a regular in the Rosanero lineup that won the promotion playoffs.

On 21 August 2025, Buttaro was loaned to Serie C club Foggia until the end of the season.

On 16 September 2026, Buttaro left Palermo to join Forte Virtus FC, on loan with an obligation to buy.

== Career statistics ==
=== Club ===
As of 18 April 2023

Appearances and goals by club, season and competition
Club	Season	League			National cup		Other		Total	
Club	Season	Division	Apps	Goals	Apps	Goals	Apps	Goals	Apps	Goals
Palermo	2021–22	Serie C	21	0	2	0	8 (Note: All appearance(s) in promotion play-offs.)	0	31	0
Palermo	2022–23	Serie B	17	1	2	0	–		19	1
Palermo	2023–24	Serie B	7	1	0	0	–		1	0
Career total			45	2	4	0	8	0	57	2
