= Ivan Marconi =

Italian footballer

Personal information
- Date of birth: 25 October 1989 (age 37)
- Place of birth: Brescia, Italy
- Height: 1.82 m (6 ft 0 in)
- Position: Centre-back

Team information
- Current team: Virtus Entella
- Number: 15

Youth career
- 2005–2007: Inter Milan
- 2007–2008: Lumezzane
- 2007–2008: → Brescia (loan)

Senior career*
Years	Team	Apps	(Gls)
2008–2009	Lumezzane	0	(0)
2008–2009	→ Sampdoria (loan)	0	(0)
2009–2010	Gubbio	35	(1)
2010–2015	Savona	145	(9)
2015–2018	Cremonese	88	(0)
2019–2020	Monza	31	(2)
2020–2024	Palermo	88	(4)
2024–	Virtus Entella	63	(5)
- * Club domestic league appearances and goals as of 13 May 2026

Ivan Marconi (born 25 October 1989) is an Italian professional footballer who plays as a centre-back for Serie B club Virtus Entella.

== Club career ==
=== Early career ===
Born in Brescia, Lombardy, Marconi started his career with Internazionale. In 2006–07 season, he was awarded no.41 shirt of the first team as a member of Primavera team. In mid-2007, he was transferred to Lumezzane for free but loaned to Brescia on 31 August 2007. In the next season, he was signed by Sampdoria youth team. Marconi received a call-up from the first team on 20 January 2009.

=== Gubbio ===
In January 2009, he was sold to Gubbio from Lumezzane in a co-ownership deal, which he played 1 1/2 seasons, mainly as central defender. In June 2010, Gubbio and Lumezzane failed to agree on a price for the remaining 50% registration rights and the rights had to be decided by closed tender between the two clubs. On 30 June 2010, the closed tender was opened on Lega Pro, and Lumezzane won at a higher price.

=== Savona ===
In August 2010, he was loaned to Savona with option to sign him in co-ownership deal from Lumezzane. On 23 June 2011 Savona excised the option. In June 2012 Savona acquired him outright.

=== Cremonese ===
On 7 July 2015 Marconi was signed by Cremonese.

=== Monza ===
On 5 January 2019, he joined Monza.

=== Palermo ===
On 20 August 2020, Marconi moved to Serie C club Palermo. He was a protagonist of the club's successful 2021–22 Serie C campaign that saw the Rosanero winning the promotion playoffs, becoming a fan favourite also thanks to his iconic bicycle kick save in the first leg of the playoff final against Padova. After being confirmed for the club's 2022–23 Serie B campaign, Marconi also proved to be a valid player at the second division level, scoring three goals during the first half of the season.

He left Palermo by the end of the 2023–24 season following the expiration of his contract.

=== Virtus Entella ===
On 23 July 2024, Marconi signed with Virtus Entella.

== Career statistics ==
=== Club ===
As of 30 January 2023

Appearances and goals by club, season and competition
Club	Season	League			National cup		Other		Total	
Club	Season	Division	Apps	Goals	Apps	Goals	Apps	Goals	Apps	Goals
Gubbio	2008–09	Lega Pro Seconda Divisione	9	0	0	0	—		9	0
Gubbio	2009–10	Lega Pro Seconda Divisione	26	1	10	0	4 (Note: All appearance(s) in promotion play-offs.)	0	40	1
Gubbio	Total		35	1	10	0	4	0	49	1
Savona	2010–11 (loan)	Lega Pro Seconda Divisione	23	0	5	0	—		28	0
Savona	2011–12	Lega Pro Seconda Divisione	35	3	1+	0	—		36+	3
Savona	2012–13	Lega Pro Seconda Divisione	29	1	2	0	—		31	1
Savona	2013–14	Lega Pro Prima Divisione	27	2	2+1	0	2	0	32	2
Savona	2014–15	Lega Pro	31	3	2	0	2 (Note: All appearance(s) in relegation play-outs.)	0	35	3
Savona	Total		145	9	13+	0	4	0	162+	9
Cremonese	2015–16	Lega Pro	25	0	1+1	0	—		27	0
Cremonese	2016–17	Lega Pro	37	0	1+1	0	2 (Note: All appearance(s) in Supercoppa di Serie C.)	0	41	0
Cremonese	2017–18	Serie B	24	0	1	0	—		25	0
Cremonese	2018–19	Serie B	2	0	0	0	—		2	0
Cremonese	Total		88	0	5	0	2	0	95	0
Monza	2018–19	Serie C	17	1	5	0	3	1	25	2
Monza	2019–20	Serie C	14	1	0	0	—		14	1
Monza	Total		31	2	5	0	3	1	39	3
Palermo	2020–21	Serie C	25	1	—		4	0	29	1
Palermo	2021–22	Serie C	24	0	2	0	8	0	34	0
Palermo	2022–23	Serie B	29	3	2	0	—		31	3
Palermo	Total		78	4	4	0	12	0	94	4
Career total			375	16	37+	0	25	1	437+	17

== Honours ==
=== Club ===
Monza

- Serie C Group A: 2019–20

Palermo

- Serie C Playoff Winner: 2021–22
