= Renzo Orihuela =

Uruguayan footballer (born 2001)

Personal information
- Full name: Renzo Miguel Orihuela Barcos
- Date of birth: 4 April 2001 (age 25)
- Place of birth: Salto, Uruguay
- Height: 1.83 m (6 ft 0 in)
- Position: Centre-back

Team information
- Current team: Sarmiento (on loan from Montevideo City Torque)
- Number: 44

Youth career
- Nacional

Senior career*
Years	Team	Apps	(Gls)
2020–	Montevideo City Torque	45	(3)
2020–2021	→ Nacional (loan)	23	(1)
2023	→ Palermo (loan)	1	(0)
2024	→ Bolívar (loan)	30	(2)
2025–	→ Sarmiento (loan)	42	(1)

International career
2023	Uruguay U23	3	(0)
- * Club domestic league appearances and goals as of 18:13, 10 November 2026 (UTC)

Renzo Miguel Orihuela Barcos (born 4 April 2001) is a Uruguayan professional footballer who plays as a centre-back for Argentine Primera División club Sarmiento, on loan from Montevideo City Torque.

== Club career ==
Orihuela is a youth academy graduate of Nacional. On 21 February 2020, he joined Montevideo City Torque. He was immediately loaned back to Nacional for two seasons. He made his professional debut for the club on 23 September 2020 in a 3–1 Copa Libertadores win against Venezuelan club Estudiantes de Mérida. He played whole 90 minutes in the match and scored his team's second goal.

On 7 January 2023, Orihuela was loaned out to Serie B club Palermo until the end of the season. In January 2025, he joined Argentine club Sarmiento on a season long loan deal.

== International career ==
Orihuela is a Uruguayan youth international. On 28 September 2023, he was named in Uruguay's squad for the 2023 Pan American Games.

== Personal life ==
In addition to his Uruguayan passport, Orihuela has also Italian citizenship through ancestry from his grandfather's side.

== Career statistics ==
As of 21 October 2022

Appearances and goals by club, season and competition
Club	Season	League			Cup		Continental		Other		Total	
Club	Season	Division	Apps	Goals	Apps	Goals	Apps	Goals	Apps	Goals	Apps	Goals
Montevideo City Torque	2021	Uruguayan Primera División	7	0	—		0	0	—		7	0
Montevideo City Torque	2022	Uruguayan Primera División	32	3	1	0	2 (Note: Appearances in Copa Libertadores.)	0	—		35	3
Montevideo City Torque	Total		39	3	1	0	2	0	0	0	42	3
Nacional (loan)	2020	Uruguayan Primera División	18	1	—		6	1	1 (Note: Appearance in Torneo Intermedio final.)	0	25	2
Nacional (loan)	2021	Uruguayan Primera División	5	0	—		2	0	0	0	7	0
Nacional (loan)	Total		23	1	0	0	8	1	1	0	32	2
Palermo (loan)	2022–23	Serie B	1	0	0	0	—		—		1	0
Career total			63	4	1	0	10	1	1	0	75	5

== Honours ==
Nacional

- Uruguayan Primera División: 2020
- Supercopa Uruguaya: 2021
