= FIFA Transfer Matching System =

Football player transfer online system

FIFA Transfer Matching System (TMS)
- Developer: FIFA
- Initial release: 2010
- Website: fifatms.com

The FIFA Transfer Matching System is an online platform for FIFA's Member's Associations to record player transfers between clubs. The introduction of the system was approved by the FIFA Congress in 2009, and was made mandatory from 1 October 2010.

The purpose of the system is to improve transparency, efficiency and governance between clubs and football associations.

The purchasing and selling club are both required to enter details of the transfer. Crucially, the details must match in order for the transfer to be approved and in cross-border cases, an International Transfer Certificate is dispensed.

There are two variants; Domestic Transfer Matching System (DTMS) for player transfers between clubs affiliated to the same association and International Transfer Matching System (ITMS) for player transfers between two different football associations.

In addition to the obligation to pay compensation, sporting sanctions shall also be imposed on any player found to be in breach of contract during the protected period. This sanction shall be a four-month restriction on playing in official matches. In the case of aggravating circumstances, the restriction shall last six months. These sporting sanctions shall take effect immediately once the player has been notified of the relevant decision. The sporting sanctions shall remain suspended in the period between the last official match of the season and the first official match of the next season, in both cases including national cups and international championships for clubs. This suspension. For nitery, if the player signs a contract under temptation while has a valid contract. The contract should be suspended immediately. The DRC may impose the following severe actions:

A- Warning B- Fine C- Relegation for two full seasons D- a ban from registering players, either nationally or internationally, for one or two entire and consecutive registration periods.

In order for a club to be considered to have overdue payables in the sense of this article, the creditor (player or club) must have put the debtor club
