= 2018 FA Community Shield =

- The match programme cover
Chelsea	Manchester City
0	2
- Date: 5 August 2018
- Venue: Wembley Stadium, London
- Man of the Match: Sergio Agüero (Manchester City)
- Referee: Jon Moss (West Yorkshire)
- Attendance: 72,724

The 2018 FA Community Shield (also known as The FA Community Shield supported by McDonald's for sponsorship reasons) was the 96th FA Community Shield, an annual football match played between the title holders of the Premier League and FA Cup. It was contested by Manchester City, champions of the 2017–18 Premier League, and Chelsea, winners of the 2017–18 FA Cup, at Wembley Stadium in London on 5 August 2018. Manchester City won 2–0, with both goals scored by Sergio Agüero, who was named man of the match for his performance.

Arsenal were the defending champions as winners of the 2017 edition, but did not qualify for this match, as they finished sixth in the Premier League and were knocked out of the FA Cup in the third round.

== Background ==
This was Maurizio Sarri's first competitive match in charge of Chelsea; meanwhile, it was Pep Guardiola's second cup final as the manager of Manchester City, following their victory over Arsenal in the 2018 EFL Cup final.

Manchester City qualified for the competition by winning the 2017–18 Premier League with a record 100 points, the first of any English club in the top-flight since the introduction of the three points for a win rule.

Chelsea were looking to win the Community Shield for the first time since 2009, when they beat Manchester United 4–1 on penalties. They had failed to win any of their last four appearances in the competition. Manchester City had won their last two matches at Wembley, both in 2017–18 – beating Arsenal 3–0 in the EFL Cup final in February and Tottenham Hotspur 3–1 in the league in April; however, they had not won three consecutive matches at Wembley since March 1970.

The two sides faced each other in the Community Shield once previously, in 2012, a match won 3–2 by Manchester City.

== Match ==
=== Details ===
5 August 2018
15:00 BST

Chelsea	0–2	Manchester City
	Report	Agüero 13', 58'

Wembley Stadium, London
Attendance: 72,724
Referee: Jon Moss (West Yorkshire)

Chelsea	Manchester City

GK	1	(Argentina) Willy Caballero
RB	28	(Spain) César Azpilicueta (c)
CB	2	(Germany) Antonio Rüdiger
CB	30	(Brazil) David Luiz
LB	3	(Spain) Marcos Alonso
CM	4	(Spain) Cesc Fàbregas	(substituted off) 60'
CM	5	(Italy) Jorginho
CM	8	(England) Ross Barkley
RF	11	(Spain) Pedro	(substituted off) 79'
CF	29	(Spain) Álvaro Morata	(substituted off) 69'
LF	20	(England) Callum Hudson-Odoi	(substituted off) 60'
Substitutes:
GK	59	(Poland) Marcin Bułka
DF	21	(Italy) Davide Zappacosta
DF	27	(Denmark) Andreas Christensen
MF	6	(England) Danny Drinkwater	(substituted on) 60'
MF	15	(Nigeria) Victor Moses	(substituted on) 79'
MF	22	(Brazil) Willian	(substituted on) 60'
FW	19	(England) Tammy Abraham	(substituted on) 69'
Head coach:
(Italy) Maurizio Sarri

GK	1	(Chile) Claudio Bravo
RB	2	(England) Kyle Walker
CB	5	(England) John Stones	(substituted off) 90+4'
CB	14	(France) Aymeric Laporte	(substituted off) 87'
LB	22	(France) Benjamin Mendy
CM	20	(Portugal) Bernardo Silva
CM	25	(Brazil) Fernandinho (c)
CM	47	(England) Phil Foden	(substituted off) 75'
RF	26	(Algeria) Riyad Mahrez	(substituted off) 68'
CF	10	(Argentina) Sergio Agüero	(substituted off) 80'
LF	19	(Germany) Leroy Sané	(substituted off) 46'
Substitutes:
GK	31	(Brazil) Ederson
DF	4	(Belgium) Vincent Kompany	(substituted on) 80'
DF	30	(Argentina) Nicolás Otamendi	(substituted on) 87'
MF	8	(Germany) İlkay Gündoğan	(substituted on) 46'
MF	55	(Spain) Brahim Díaz	(substituted on) 75'
MF	81	(France) Claudio Gomes	(substituted on) 90+4'
FW	33	(Brazil) Gabriel Jesus	(substituted on) 68'
Manager:
(Spain) Pep Guardiola

Man of the Match:
Sergio Agüero (Manchester City)

Assistant referees:
Adam Nunn (Wiltshire)
Eddie Smart (West Midlands)
Fourth official:
Paul Tierney (Lancashire)
Reserve assistant referee:
Dan Cook (Hampshire)
Video assistant referee:
Stuart Attwell (West Midlands)
Assistant video assistant referee:
Andrew Halliday (Army)

Match rules

- 90 minutes
- Penalty shoot-out (ABBA) if scores level
- Seven named substitutes, of which up to six may be used
