= 2023–24 Benevento Calcio season =

Benevento Calcio
2023–24 season
- Manager: Matteo Andreoletti
- Stadium: Stadio Ciro Vigorito
- Serie C: 4th
- Coppa Italia Serie C: First round
- Top goalscorer: League: Alexis Ferrante (4); All: Alexis Ferrante (4)

The 2023–24 season is Benevento Calcio's 95th season in existence and first season back in the Serie C. They are also competing in the Coppa Italia Serie C.

== Players ==
=== First-team squad ===
As of 2 September 2023

Note: Flags indicate national team as defined under FIFA eligibility rules; some limited exceptions apply. Players may hold more than one non-FIFA nationality.

No.	Pos.	Nation	Player
1	GK	ITA	Alessandro Nunziante
3	DF	ITA	Amedeo Benedetti
5	DF	ITA	Edoardo Masciangelo
6	DF	ITA	Biagio Meccariello
7	MF	SWE	Nermin Karić
8	MF	POL	Krzysztof Kubica
9	FW	ITA	Alessandro Marotta
10	FW	ITA	Camillo Ciano
11	FW	ITA	Alexis Ferrante (on loan from Ternana)
12	GK	ITA	Nicolò Manfredini
14	MF	ITA	Marco Pinato
16	MF	ITA	Riccardo Improta
18	MF	ITA	Pier Luigi Simonetti
20	DF	ITA	Filippo Berra
21	MF	ITA	Davide Agazzi

No.	Pos.	Nation	Player
23	DF	ITA	Francesco Rillo
24	GK	ITA	Alberto Paleari
25	DF	ITA	Angelo Viscardi
27	MF	ITA	Ernesto Starita
28	DF	ITA	Emanuele Terranova
30	FW	ITA	Lorenzo Carfora
31	FW	ITA	Filippo Nardi (on loan from Cremonese)
36	DF	ITA	Francesco Perlingieri
38	MF	ITA	Angelo Talia
58	DF	ITA	Christian Pastina
77	MF	ITA	Riccardo Rossi
90	MF	ITA	Eric Lanini (on loan from Parma)
96	DF	ITA	Riccardo Capellini
98	FW	NED	Don Bolsius
99	FW	ITA	Amato Ciciretti

=== Out on loan ===
Note: Flags indicate national team as defined under FIFA eligibility rules; some limited exceptions apply. Players may hold more than one non-FIFA nationality.

No.	Pos.	Nation	Player
—	GK	ITA	Manuel Esposito (at Campobasso until 30 June 2024)
—	GK	ITA	Igor Lucatelli (at Virtus Francavilla until 30 June 2024)
—	DF	ITA	Gaetano Letizia (at Feralpisalò until 30 June 2024)
—	DF	ITA	Giuseppe Riccio (at Portici until 30 June 2024)
—	DF	ROU	Alin Toșca (at Al-Riyadh until 30 June 2024)
—	DF	ITA	Angelo Veltri (at Recanatese until 30 June 2024)
—	MF	ITA	Gennaro Acampora (at Bari until 30 June 2024)

No.	Pos.	Nation	Player
—	MF	ITA	Vincenzo Bisogno (at Ischia until 30 June 2024)
—	MF	GRE	Ilias Koutsoupias (at Bari until 30 June 2024)
—	MF	ITA	Francesco Parisi (at Casarano until 30 June 2024)
—	MF	ITA	Antonio Prisco (at Recanatese until 30 June 2024)
—	MF	ITA	Mattia Viviani (at Cosenza until 30 June 2024)
—	FW	ITA	Domenico Valentino (at Atletico Ascoli until 30 June 2024)

== Transfers ==
=== In ===
Pos.	Player	Transferred from	Fee	Date	Source
FW	(Netherlands) Don Bolsius	(Italy) Fidelis Andria	Free	4 July 2023	
DF	(Italy) Amedeo Benedetti	(Italy) Pordenone	Free	17 July 2023	
DF	(Italy) Biagio Meccariello	(Italy) SPAL	Free	1 August 2023	
DF	(Italy) Marco Pinato	(Italy) Pordenone	Free	17 August 2023	
DF	(Italy) Filippo Berra	(Italy) Südtirol	Free	19 August 2023	
MF	(Italy) Davide Agazzi	(Italy) Ternana	Free	19 August 2023	
FW	(Italy) Alessandro Marotta	(Italy) Giugliano	Free	24 August 2023	
FW	(Italy) Alexis Ferrante	(Italy) Ternana	Loan	31 August 2023	
MF	(Italy) Pier Luigi Simonetti	(Italy) Ancona	Free	1 September 2023	
DF	(Italy) Emanuele Terranova	(Italy) Reggina	Free	8 September 2023	
FW	(Italy) Amato Ciciretti	(Italy) Pordenone	Free	8 September 2023	
FW	(Italy) Eric Lanini	(Italy) Parma	Loan	19 January 2024	
FW	(Italy) Ernesto Starita	(Italy) Monopoli	Free	14 January 2024	
MF	(Italy) Filippo Nardi	(Italy) Cremonese	Loan	31 January 2024	

=== Out ===
Pos.	Player	Transferred to	Fee	Date	Source
DF	(Romania) Alin Tosca	(Saudi Arabia) Al-Riyadh	Loan	20 July 2023	
MF	(Greece) Ilias Koutsoupias	(Italy) Bari	Loan	19 August 2023	
MF	(Italy) Mattia Viviani	(Italy) Cosenza	Loan	19 August 2023	
DF	(Italy) Gaetano Letizia	(Italy) Feralpisalo	Loan	1 September 2023	
MF	(Italy) Gennaro Acampora	(Italy) Bari	Loan	1 September 2023	
MF	(Colombia) Andres Tello	(Italy) Catania	Free	30 January 2024	
DF	(Morocco) Hamza El Kaouakibi	(Italy) Sudtirol	Loan	26 January 2024	

== Pre-season and friendlies ==
Win Draw Loss Fixtures

11 August 2023 Friendly	Roma U19 (Italy)	1–3	(Italy) Benevento
17:45 CEST (UTC+2)

12 August 2023 Friendly	Benevento (Italy)	1–1	(Italy) Monterosi
17:45 CEST (UTC+2)

== Competitions ==
=== Overall record ===
Competition	First match	Last match	Starting round	Final position	Record							
Competition	First match	Last match	Starting round	Final position	Pld	W	D	L	GF	GA	GD	Win %
Serie C	3 September 2023	27 April 2024	Matchday 1	3rd	38	18	12	8	45	33	+12	47.37
Promotion play-offs	14 May 2024		First round		3	2	1	0	4	2	+2	66.67
Coppa Italia Serie C	4 October 2023		First round	First round	1	0	1	0	2	2	+0	0.00
Total					42	20	14	8	51	37	+14	47.62

Source: Soccerway

=== Serie C ===
==== League table ====
Pos	Team	Pld	W	D	L	GF	GA	GD	Pts	Qualification
1	Juve Stabia (P)	38	22	13	3	57	24	+33	79	Promotion to Serie B and Supercoppa di Serie C
2	Avellino	38	20	9	9	62	29	+33	69	National play-offs 2nd round
3	Benevento	38	18	12	8	45	33	+12	66	National play-offs 1st round
4	Casertana	38	17	14	7	51	38	+13	65 (Note: Casertana are ahead of Taranto on head-to-head points: Casertana 6, Taranto 0.)	Group play-offs 2nd round
5	Taranto (Note: 4 points deducted due to administrative irregularities.)	38	20	9	9	46	31	+15	65	Group play-offs 1st round

Updated to match(es) played on 27 April 2024. Source: Lega Pro, Soccerway (in English)
Rules for classification: 1) Points; 2) Head-to-head points; 3) Head-to-head goal difference; 4) Goal difference; 5) Goals scored; 6) Lower goals against; 7) Wins; 8) Lower losses; 9) Away wins; 10) Lower home losses.
(Note: Head-to-head record is used only after all the matches between the teams in question have been played)
(P) Promoted

==== Results summary ====
Overall								Home						Away					
Pld	W	D	L	GF	GA	GD	Pts	W	D	L	GF	GA	GD	W	D	L	GF	GA	GD
38	18	12	8	45	33	+12	66	11	5	3	30	18	+12	7	7	5	15	15	0

Source: Worldfootball

==== Results by round ====
Round	1	2	3	4	5	6	7	8	9	10	11	12	13	14	15	16	17	18
Ground	A	H	A	H	A	H	A	H	A	A	H	A	H	A	H	A	H	A
Result	L	W	D	W	W	W	D	D	W	D	W	W	D	L	W	L	L	
Position	17	9	8	5	5	2	2	4	2	3	3	2	3	4	3	4		

Source: Worldfootball
A = Away; H = Home; W = Win; D = Draw; L = Loss

==== Matches ====
The league fixtures were unveiled on 7 August 2023.

3 September 2023 1	Turris	3–1	Benevento
20:45 CEST (UTC+2)

11 September 2023 2	Benevento	1–0	Virtus Francavilla	Benevento
20:45 CEST (UTC+2)				Stadium: Stadio Ciro Vigorito

17 September 2023 3	Casertana	0–0	Benevento
20:45 CEST (UTC+2)

21 September 2023 4	Benevento	2–1	Taranto	Benevento
18:30 CEST (UTC+2)				Stadium: Stadio Ciro Vigorito

25 September 2023 5	Brindisi	0–1	Benevento
20:45 CEST (UTC+2)

1 October 2023 6	Benevento	3–2	Crotone	Benevento
18:30 CEST (UTC+2)				Stadium: Stadio Ciro Vigorito

8 October 2023 7	Audace Cerignola	0–0	Benevento
20:45 CEST (UTC+2)

15 October 2023 8	Benevento	2–2	Picerno	Benevento
14:00 CEST (UTC+2)				Stadium: Stadio Ciro Vigorito

21 October 2023 9	Sorrento	0–1	Benevento
18:30 CEST (UTC+2)

26 October 2023 10	Foggia	0–0	Benevento	Foggia
20:45 CEST (UTC+2)				Stadium: Stadio Pino Zaccheria

30 October 2023 11	Benevento	1–0	Potenza	Benevento
20:45 CET (UTC+1)	Masciangelo 33'			Stadium: Stadio Ciro Vigorito

5 November 2023 12	Messina	0–1	Benevento	Messina
18:30 CET (UTC+1)				Stadium: Stadio San Filippo

13 November 2023 13	Benevento	2–2	Giugliano	Benevento
20:45 CET (UTC+1)				Stadium: Stadio Ciro Vigorito

19 November 2023 14	Monopoli	3–0	Benevento	Benevento
16:15 CET (UTC+1)				Stadium: Stadio Ciro Vigorito

27 November 2023 15	Benevento	2–1	Monterosi	Benevento
20:45 CET (UTC+1)				Stadium: Stadio Ciro Vigorito

3 December 2023 16	Juve Stabia	1–0	Benevento	Benevento
16:00 CET (UTC+1)				Stadium: Stadio Ciro Vigorito

10 December 2023 17	Benevento	0–1	Avellino	Benevento
18:35 CET (UTC+1)				Stadium: Stadio Ciro Vigorito

18 December 2023 18	Latina	0–0	Benevento	Latina
16:15 CET (UTC+1)				Stadium: Stadio Domenico Francioni

26 February 2024 28	Benevento	4–0	Sorrento	Benevento
20:45				Stadium: Stadio Ciro Vigorito

2 March 2024 29	Benevento	1–0	Foggia	Benevento
20:45				Stadium: Stadio Ciro Vigorito

7 March 2024 30	Potenza	0–2	Benevento	Potenza

10 March 2024 31	Benevento	1–1	Messina	Benevento
18:30				Stadium: Stadio Ciro Vigorito

16 March 2024 32	Giugliano	1–2	Benevento	Giugliano

23 March 2024 33	Benevento	0–1	Monopoli	Benevento
14:00				Stadium: Stadio Ciro Vigorito

30 March 2024 34	Monterosi	1–1	Benevento	Monterosi

8 April 2024 35	Benevento	0–0	Juve Stabia	Benevento
20:30				Stadium: Stadio Ciro Vigorito

15 April 2024 36	Avellino	1–0	Benevento	Avellino

21 April 2024 37	Benevento	4–0	Latina	Benevento
20:00				Stadium: Stadio Ciro Vigorito

27 April 2024 38	Catania	1–0	Benevento	Catania
18:30	Cianci 45+1'			Stadium: Stadio Angelo Massimino; Referee: Emanuele Frascaro

=== Coppa Italia Serie C ===
4 October 2023 First round	Benevento	2–2 (a.e.t.) (5–6 p)	Giugliano	Benevento
20:45 CEST (UTC+2)	Marotta 48'; Bolsius 120+2'		Yabre 53'; Caldore 115'	Stadium: Stadio Ciro Vigorito

== See also ==
- History of Benevento Calcio
