= 2021–22 Piacenza Calcio 1919 season =

Piacenza Calcio 1919
2021–22 season
- Manager: Cristiano Scazzola (until 20 May); Manuel Scalise (from 1 June)
- Stadium: Stadio Leonardo Garilli
- Serie C: 9th
- Coppa Italia Serie C: Quarter-finals

The 2021–22 season was Piacenza Calcio 1919's 103rd season in existence and seventh consecutive in the Serie C. They also competed in the Coppa Italia Serie C.

== Players ==
=== First-team squad ===
Note: Flags indicate national team as defined under FIFA eligibility rules; some limited exceptions apply. Players may hold more than one non-FIFA nationality.

No.	Pos.	Nation	Player
1	GK	ITA	Leandro Pratelli (on loan from Empoli)
2	DF	ITA	Francesco Rillo (on loan from Benevento)
3	DF	ITA	Francesco Cosenza
4	DF	ITA	Riccardo Nava
5	DF	ALB	Shaqir Tafa
7	MF	ITA	Davide Lamesta
8	MF	BIH	Ćazim Suljić
9	FW	LTU	Edgaras Dubickas
10	MF	ITA	Alessandro Cesarini
12	GK	ITA	Nicola Tintori (on loan from Pro Vercelli)
13	DF	ITA	Paolo Marchi
14	MF	ITA	Luca Castiglia
15	DF	ITA	Tino Parisi

No.	Pos.	Nation	Player
18	MF	GAM	Yusupha Bobb
19	FW	ITA	Simone Rabbi (on loan from Bologna)
21	DF	ITA	Simone Giordano (on loan from Sampdoria)
22	GK	ITA	Simone Stucchi
23	DF	ITA	Andrea Corbari
24	MF	ITA	Andrea Marino (on loan from Lazio)
25	MF	ITA	Nicolò Armini (on loan from Lazio)
26	MF	RUS	Juri Gonzi
27	MF	ITA	Davide Munari (on loan from Cesena)
30	MF	ITA	Massimiliano Rossi
32	FW	SUI	Kevin Gissi
39	FW	MNE	Filip Raičević

==== Out on loan ====
Note: Flags indicate national team as defined under FIFA eligibility rules; some limited exceptions apply. Players may hold more than one non-FIFA nationality.

No. / Pos. / Nation / Player; — / GK / ITA / Filippo Ansaldi (at Caronnese until 30 June 2022)	No. / Pos. / Nation / Player; — / DF / ITA / Roberto Codromaz (at Teramo until 30 June 2022)

== Transfers ==
=== In ===
Pos.	Player	Transferred from	Fee	Date	Source
DF	(Italy) Antony Angileri	(Italy) Sampdoria U19	Loan	6 August 2021	
DF	(Italy) Nicolò Armini	(Italy) Lazio	Loan	10 August 2021	
FW	(Italy) Simone Rabbi	(Italy) Bologna U19	Loan	25 August 2021	
FW	(Montenegro) Filip Raičević	Unattached	Free	4 November 2021	
MF	(Italy) Luca Castiglia	(Italy) Salernitana	Free	20 January 2022	

=== Out ===
Pos.	Player	Transferred to	Fee	Date	Source
MF	(Italy) Gianluca Nicco	(Italy) Pro Patria	Free	1 July 2021	

== Pre-season and friendlies ==
Win Draw Loss

26 July 2021 Friendly	Sampdoria (Italy)	2–0	(Italy) Piacenza	Genoa, Italy
18:00 CEST (UTC+2)	Quagliarella 31', 41'			Stadium: Stadio Luigi Ferraris; Referee: Gianmarco Vailati

1 August 2021 Friendly	Pergolettese (Italy)	3–2	(Italy) Piacenza
17:00 CEST (UTC+2)		Report	Parisi; Marchi

13 August 2021 Friendly	Piacenza (Italy)	4–1	(Italy) AC Leon	Piacenza
--:-- CEST (UTC+2)				Stadium: Campo sportivo Bertocchi

== Competitions ==
=== Overall record ===
Competition	First match	Last match	Starting round	Final position	Record							
Competition	First match	Last match	Starting round	Final position	Pld	W	D	L	GF	GA	GD	Win %
Serie C	29 August 2021	24 April 2022	Matchday 1	9th	38	12	14	12	44	46	−2	31.58
Coppa Italia Serie C	22 August 2021	24 November 2021	First round	Quarter-finals	4	2	1	1	7	6	+1	50.00
Total					42	14	15	13	51	52	−1	33.33

Source: Soccerway

=== Serie C ===
==== League table ====
Pos	Team	Pld	W	D	L	GF	GA	GD	Pts	Qualification
7	Pro Vercelli	38	14	13	11	41	40	+1	55 (Note: Triestina (5th placed) 9 points; Lecco 4 (-1); Pro Vercelli 4 (-2). (LEC-PVE 0-0; LEC-TRI 2-0; PVE-LEC 1-0; TRI-LEC 2-0; TRI-PVE 4-2; PVE-TRI 1-2). Lecco qualifies as sixth-placed due to higher head-to-head goal difference over Pro Vercelli.)	Qualification for the promotion play-offs
8	Juventus U23	38	15	9	14	43	43	0	54	Qualification for the promotion play-offs
9	Piacenza	38	12	14	12	44	46	−2	50	Qualification for the promotion play-offs
10	Pergolettese (Note: 1 point deducted due to financial irregularities.)	38	12	11	15	42	55	−13	46	Qualification for the promotion play-offs
11	Pro Patria	38	10	15	13	38	45	−7	45 (Note: Pro Patria qualifies to playoffs due to head-to-head matches: Pro Patria 7; Albinoleffe 6; Virtus Verona 2. (ALB-VVE 0-0; VVE-PPA 0-2; VVE-ALB 0-0; PPA-VVE 1-0; ALB-PPA 1-1; PPA-ALB 1-2))	Qualification for the promotion play-offs

Source: Lega Pro, Soccerway (in English)
Rules for classification: 1) Points; 2) Head-to-head points; 3) Head-to-head goal difference; 4) Goal difference; 5) Goals scored; 6) Lower goals against; 7) Wins; 8) Lower losses; 9) Away wins; 10) Lower home losses.

==== Results summary ====
Overall								Home						Away					
Pld	W	D	L	GF	GA	GD	Pts	W	D	L	GF	GA	GD	W	D	L	GF	GA	GD
38	12	14	12	44	46	−2	50	7	6	6	18	17	+1	5	8	6	26	29	−3

Source: Worldfootball

==== Results by round ====
Round	1	2	3	4	5	6	7	8	9	10	11	12	13	14	15	16	17	18	19	20	21	22	23	24	25	26	27	28	29	30	31	32	33	34	35	36	37	38
Ground	H	A	A	H	A	H	A	H	H	A	H	A	H	A	H	A	H	A	H	A	H	H	A	H	A	H	A	A	H	A	H	A	H	A	H	A	H	A
Result	D	D	D	D	L	W	D	D	L	L	D	W	W	D	L	W	L	D	D	L	W	L	D	W	W	W	L	L	W	D	D	W	L	L	W	W	L	D
Position	10	12	12	11	13	12	11	11	12	15	16	11	10	9	10	8	10	12	12	13	10	12	12	9	9	9	9	9	9	9	9	9	9	9	9	9	9	9

Source: Worldfootball
A = Away; H = Home; W = Win; D = Draw; L = Loss

==== Matches ====
The league fixtures were unveiled on 9 August 2021.

29 August 2021 1	Piacenza	0–0	Trento	Piacenza
17:30 CEST (UTC+2)				Stadium: Stadio Leonardo Garilli; Referee: Enrico Gemelli

13 September 2021 3	Triestina	2–2	Piacenza	Trieste
--:-- CEST (UTC+2)				Stadium: Stadio Nereo Rocco

19 September 2021 4	Piacenza	1–1	Pro Patria	Piacenza
--:-- CEST (UTC+2)				Stadium: Stadio Leonardo Garilli

22 September 2021 2	Virtus Verona	1–1	Piacenza	Verona
20:30 CEST (UTC+2)	Pittarello 66' (pen.)		Parisi 53'	Stadium: Stadio Gavagnin-Nocini; Referee: Marco Emmanuele

26 September 2021 5	Mantova	2–1	Piacenza	Mantua
--:-- CEST (UTC+2)				Stadium: Stadio Danilo Martelli

29 September 2021 6	Piacenza	1–0	Legnago Salus	Piacenza
--:-- CEST (UTC+2)				Stadium: Stadio Leonardo Garilli

3 October 2021 7	Pergolettese	2–2	Piacenza	Crema
--:-- CEST (UTC+2)				Stadium: Stadio Giuseppe Voltini

17 October 2021 9	Piacenza	1–2	Pro Sesto	Piacenza
--:-- CEST (UTC+2)				Stadium: Stadio Leonardo Garilli

20 October 2021 10	Südtirol	2–0	Piacenza	Bolzano
--:-- CEST (UTC+2)				Stadium: Stadio Druso

24 October 2021 11	Piacenza	1–1	Giana Erminio	Piacenza
--:-- CEST (UTC+2)				Stadium: Stadio Leonardo Garilli

27 October 2021 8	Piacenza	1–1	Juventus U23	Piacenza
--:-- CEST (UTC+2)				Stadium: Stadio Leonardo Garilli

31 October 2021 12	Pro Vercelli	1–3	Piacenza	Vercelli
--:-- CET (UTC+1)				Stadium: Stadio Silvio Piola

7 November 2021 13	Piacenza	3–1	Renate	Piacenza
--:-- CET (UTC+1)				Stadium: Stadio Leonardo Garilli

14 November 2021 14	Fiorenzuola	1–1	Piacenza	Fiorenzuola d'Arda
14:30 CET (UTC+1)				Stadium: Stadio comunale

21 November 2021 15	Piacenza	1–3	Padova	Piacenza
--:-- CET (UTC+1)				Stadium: Stadio Leonardo Garilli

29 November 2021 16	AlbinoLeffe	2–3	Piacenza	Gorgonzola
14:30 CET (UTC+1)	Ravasio 8'; Galeandro 62'		Gonzi 19'; Rabbi 23'; Corbari 76'	Stadium: Stadio Città di Gorgonzola; Referee: Ettore Longo

5 December 2021 17	Piacenza	0–1	Lecco	Piacenza
--:-- CET (UTC+1)				Stadium: Stadio Leonardo Garilli

12 December 2021 18	Feralpisalò	1–1	Piacenza	Salò
--:-- CET (UTC+1)				Stadium: Stadio Lino Turina

18 December 2021 19	Piacenza	1–1	Seregno	Piacenza
--:-- CET (UTC+1)				Stadium: Stadio Leonardo Garilli

21 December 2021 20	Trento	1–0	Piacenza	Trento
18:00 CET (UTC+1)	Belcastro 36' (pen.)			Stadium: Stadio Briamasco; Referee: Maria Sole Ferrieri Caputi

23 January 2022 23	Pro Patria	2–2	Piacenza	Busto Arsizio
14:30 CET (UTC+1)	Pierozzi 2'; Galli 55'		Cesarini 51' (pen.); Pizzul 82' (o.g.); Cosenza (red card) 90+2'	Stadium: Stadio Carlo Speroni; Referee: Niccolo Turrini

29 January 2022 24	Piacenza	1–0	Mantova	Piacenza
--:-- CET (UTC+1)				Stadium: Stadio Leonardo Garilli

1 February 2022 21	Piacenza	1–0	Virtus Verona	Piacenza
--:-- CET (UTC+1)				Stadium: Stadio Leonardo Garilli

5 February 2022 25	Legnago Salus	0–1	Piacenza	Legnago
14:30 CET (UTC+1)			Dubickas 74' (pen.)	Stadium: Stadio Mario Sandrini; Referee: Stefano Nicolini

13 February 2022 26	Piacenza	3–0	Pergolettese	Piacenza
--:-- CET (UTC+1)				Stadium: Stadio Leonardo Garilli

17 February 2022 27	Juventus U23	4–0	Piacenza	Alessandria
18:00 CET (UTC+1)				Stadium: Stadio Giuseppe Moccagatta; Referee: Maria Sole Ferrieri Caputi

20 February 2022 28	Pro Sesto	2–1	Piacenza	Sesto San Giovanni
14:30 CET (UTC+1)				Stadium: Stadio Ernesto Breda; Referee: Aleksandar Djurdjevic

23 February 2022 22	Piacenza	0–2	Triestina	Piacenza
--:-- CET (UTC+1)				Stadium: Stadio Leonardo Garilli

27 February 2022 29	Piacenza	1–0	Südtirol	Piacenza
--:-- CET (UTC+1)				Stadium: Stadio Leonardo Garilli

6 March 2022 30	Giana Erminio	0–0	Piacenza	Gorgonzola
14:30 CET (UTC+1)				Stadium: Stadio Città di Gorgonzola

13 March 2022 31	Piacenza	0–0	Pro Vercelli	Piacenza
--:-- CET (UTC+1)				Stadium: Stadio Leonardo Garilli

16 March 2022 32	Renate	0–3	Piacenza	Renate
--:-- CET (UTC+1)				Stadium: Stadio Città di Meda

20 March 2022 33	Piacenza	0–1	Fiorenzuola	Piacenza
--:-- CET (UTC+1)				Stadium: Stadio Leonardo Garilli

26 March 2022 34	Padova	3–1	Piacenza	Padova
--:-- CET (UTC+1)				Stadium: Stadio Euganeo

2 April 2022 35	Piacenza	2–1	AlbinoLeffe	Piacenza
--:-- CEST (UTC+2)				Stadium: Stadio Leonardo Garilli

10 April 2022 36	Lecco	1–2	Piacenza	Lecco
--:-- CEST (UTC+2)				Stadium: Stadio Rigamonti-Ceppi

16 April 2022 37	Piacenza	0–2	Feralpisalò	Piacenza
--:-- CEST (UTC+2)				Stadium: Stadio Leonardo Garilli

24 April 2022 38	Seregno	2–2	Piacenza	Seregno
--:-- CEST (UTC+2)				Stadium: Stadio Ferruccio; Referee: Matteo Gualtieri

=== Coppa Italia Serie C ===
22 August 2021 First round	Piacenza	1–0	Reggiana	Piacenza
17:30 CEST (UTC+2)				Stadium: Stadio Leonardo Garilli

8 September 2021 Second round	Piacenza	2–1	Mantova	Piacenza
20:30 CEST (UTC+2)				Stadium: Stadio Leonardo Garilli

3 November 2021 Round of 16	Modena	4–4 (a.e.t.) (3–4 p)	Piacenza	Modena
15:00 CET (UTC+1)				Stadium: Stadio Alberto Braglia

24 November 2021 Quarter-finals	Fidelis Andria	1–0	Piacenza	Andria
14:30 CET (UTC+1)	Bubas 25'			Stadium: Stadio Degli Ulivi
