= 2022–23 Benevento Calcio season =

Benevento Calcio
2022–23 season
- President: Oreste Vigorito
- Manager: Fabio Caserta (until 20 September); Fabio Cannavaro (from 21 September until 4 February); Roberto Stellone (from 6 February until 10 April); Andrea Agostinelli (from 12 April)
- Stadium: Stadio Ciro Vigorito
- Serie B: 20th (relegated)
- Coppa Italia: Round of 64
Home colours	Away colours	Third colours

The 2022–23 season was the 94th season in the history of Benevento Calcio and their second consecutive season in the second division. The club participated in Serie B and the Coppa Italia.

== Players ==
As of 31 January 2023

Note: Flags indicate national team as defined under FIFA eligibility rules; some limited exceptions apply. Players may hold more than one non-FIFA nationality.

No.	Pos.	Nation	Player
2	DF	MAR	Hamza El Kaouakibi
3	DF	ITA	Gaetano Letizia
4	MF	ITA	Gennaro Acampora
6	MF	POL	Krzysztof Kubica
7	MF	BIH	Nermin Karić
8	MF	COL	Andrés Tello
9	FW	ITA	Stefano Pettinari (on loan from Ternana)
10	FW	BRA	Diego Farias
11	MF	CRO	Roko Jureškin (on loan from Pisa)
12	GK	ITA	Nicolò Manfredini
14	FW	SEN	Pape Samba Thiam
15	DF	POL	Kamil Glik
16	MF	ITA	Riccardo Improta
18	DF	BEL	Daam Foulon
20	FW	ITA	Antonino La Gumina (on loan from Sampdoria)

No.	Pos.	Nation	Player
21	GK	ITA	Alberto Paleari
22	GK	ITA	Igor Lucatelli
24	MF	ITA	Mattia Viviani
25	FW	NGR	Simy (on loan from Salernitana)
27	MF	ITA	Pasquale Schiattarella
28	FW	ITA	Camillo Ciano
30	MF	GHA	Abdallah Basit
31	DF	ROU	Alin Toșca
33	DF	FRA	Maxime Leverbe (on loan from Sampdoria)
55	DF	ALB	Frédéric Veseli
58	DF	ITA	Christian Pastina
72	MF	SLO	Dejan Vokić
79	MF	CIV	Siriki Sanogo
80	MF	GRE	Ilias Koutsoupias (on loan from Virtus Entella)
96	DF	ITA	Riccardo Capellini

=== Out on loan ===
Note: Flags indicate national team as defined under FIFA eligibility rules; some limited exceptions apply. Players may hold more than one non-FIFA nationality.

No.	Pos.	Nation	Player
—	DF	ITA	Edoardo Masciangelo (at Palermo until 30 June 2023)
—	DF	ITA	Francesco Rillo (at Potenza until 30 June 2023)
—	MF	ITA	Vincenzo Alfieri (at Recanatese until 30 June 2023)
—	MF	ITA	Davide Masella (at Potenza until 30 June 2023)
—	MF	ITA	Angelo Talia (at Potenza until 30 June 2023)

No.	Pos.	Nation	Player
—	FW	ITA	Enrico Brignola (at Catanzaro until 30 June 2023)
—	FW	ITA	Francesco Forte (at Ascoli until 30 June 2023)
—	FW	ITA	Gabriele Moncini (at SPAL until 30 June 2023, obligation to buy)
—	FW	ITA	Bruno Umile (at Sambenedettese until 30 June 2023)

== Pre-season and friendlies ==
Win Draw Loss Fixtures

15 July 2022 Friendly	Benevento (Italy)	14–0	(Italy) USD Cascia	Cascia
18:00 CEST (UTC+2)		Report		Stadium: Centro Sportivo Magrelli; Referee: Luigi Viola

17 July 2022 Friendly	Benevento (Italy)	3–2	(Italy) Roma Primavera	Cascia
18:00 CEST (UTC+2)		Report		Stadium: Centro Sportivo Magrelli; Referee: Di Loretto

23 July 2022 Friendly	Benevento (Italy)	0–1	(Italy) Cosenza	Cascia
18:00 CEST (UTC+2)		Report	Prestianni 23'	Stadium: Centro Sportivo Magrelli

29 July 2022 Friendly	Benevento (Italy)	0–0	(Italy) Siena	Cascia
18:00 CEST (UTC+2)				Stadium: Centro Sportivo Magrelli

== Competitions ==
=== Overall record ===
Competition	First match	Last match	Starting round	Final position	Record							
Competition	First match	Last match	Starting round	Final position	Pld	W	D	L	GF	GA	GD	Win %
Serie B	14 August 2022	19 May 2023	Matchday 1	20th	38	7	14	17	33	49	−16	18.42
Coppa Italia	8 August 2022		Round of 64	Round of 64	1	0	0	1	2	3	−1	0.00
Total					39	7	14	18	35	52	−17	17.95

Source: Soccerway

=== Serie B ===
==== League table ====
Pos	Team	Pld	W	D	L	GF	GA	GD	Pts	Promotion, qualification or relegation
16	Brescia	38	9	13	16	36	57	−21	40	Spared from relegation
17	Cosenza (O)	38	9	13	16	30	53	−23	40	Qualification for relegation play-out
18	Perugia (R)	38	10	9	19	40	52	−12	39	Relegation to Serie C
19	SPAL (R)	38	8	14	16	41	51	−10	38	Relegation to Serie C
20	Benevento (R)	38	7	14	17	33	49	−16	35	Relegation to Serie C

Source: Soccerway (in English)
Rules for classification: 1) Points; 2) Head-to-head points; 3) Head-to-head goal difference; 4) Goal difference; 5) Goals scored; 6) Draw.
(O) Play-off winners; (R) Relegated

==== Results summary ====
Overall								Home						Away					
Pld	W	D	L	GF	GA	GD	Pts	W	D	L	GF	GA	GD	W	D	L	GF	GA	GD
20	5	8	7	18	21	−3	23	2	3	5	7	12	−5	3	5	2	11	9	+2

Last updated: 15 January 2023.
Source: Serie B

==== Results by round ====
Round	1	2	3	4	5	6	7	8	9	10	11	12	13	14	15	16	17	18	19	20	21	22
Ground	H	A	H	A	H	A	H	A	H	A	H	H	A	A	H	A	H	A	H	A	H	A
Result	L	D	W	W	L	L	D	D	L	L	D	D	W	D	L	W	W	D	L	D		
Position	16	16	13	6	10	13	14	12	15	16	17	17	16	15	17	15	12	12	14	15		

Updated to match(es) played on 15 January 2023. Source: Serie B
A = Away; H = Home; W = Win; D = Draw; L = Loss

==== Matches ====
The league fixtures will be announced on 15 July 2022.

14 August 2022 1	Benevento	0 - 1	Cosenza	Benevento
20:45 CET	Viviani (yellow card) 34'; Insigne (yellow card) 86'	Report	Florenzi (yellow card) 21'; Larrivey 49'; Brescianini (yellow card) 85'	Stadium: Stadio Ciro Vigorito; Attendance: 9,785; Referee: (Italy) Marco Di Bello

20 August 2022 2	Genoa	0 - 0	Benevento	Genoa
20:45 CET	Pajač (yellow card) 39'; Portanova (yellow card) 62'; Yeboah (yellow card) 90+2'	Report	Viviani (yellow card) 15'; Capellini (yellow card) 32'	Stadium: Stadio Luigi Ferraris; Attendance: 23,000; Referee: (Italy) Ivano Pezzuto

28 August 2022 3	Benevento	2 - 1	Frosinone	Benevento
20:45 CET	Forte 35' (yellow card) 57' (goal) 62'; Tello (yellow card) 83'; Foulon (yellow card) 87'	Report	Lucioni (yellow card) 18'; Boloca (yellow card) 37'; Garritano 59' (yellow card) 90+4'; Cotali (yellow card) 79'	Stadium: Stadio Ciro Vigorito; Attendance: 8,418; Referee: (Italy) Luca Pairetto

=== Coppa Italia ===
8 August 2022 Round of 64	Genoa	3 – 2	Benevento	Genoa
17:45 CEST (UTC+2)	Hefti (yellow card) 30'; Guðmundsson 35' 45'; Coda 64' (pen.); Yeboah (yellow card) 90+1'; Galdames (yellow card) 90+5'; Melegoni (yellow card) 90+6'	Report	Glik 45+3'; Letizia (yellow card) 61'; Viviani (yellow card) 61'; Tello (yellow card) 78'; Forte (yellow card) 90+1'; Karić 90+5'	Stadium: Stadio Luigi Ferraris; Attendance: 10,366; Referee: (Italy) Andrea Colombo

== See also ==
- History of Benevento Calcio
