= Emanuele Zamarion =

Italian footballer (born 2000)

Personal information
- Date of birth: 4 August 2000 (age 26)
- Place of birth: Rome, Italy
- Height: 1.91 m (6 ft 3 in)
- Position: Goalkeeper

Youth career
- –2020: Roma

Senior career*
Years	Team	Apps	(Gls)
2020–2021	Gubbio	21	(0)
2021–2022	Campobasso	8	(0)
2022–2023	Fidelis Andria	7	(0)
- * Club domestic league appearances and goals as of 29 January 2023

Emanuele Zamarion (born 4 August 2000) is an Italian professional footballer who plays as a goalkeeper.

== Career ==
On 15 July 2021, Zamarion joined to Serie C club Campobasso.

On 1 September 2022, Zamarion signed with Fidelis Andria. His contract with Fidelis Andria was terminated by mutual consent on 31 January 2023.

== Career statistics ==
As of match played 24 April 2022

Appearances and goals by club, season and competition
Club	Season	League			National Cup		Other		Total	
Club	Season	Division	Apps	Goals	Apps	Goals	Apps	Goals	Apps	Goals
Gubbio	2020–21	Serie C	21	0	—		—		21	0
Campobasso	2021–22	Serie C	8	0	—		—		8	0
Career total			29	0	0	0	0	0	29	0
