= Don Bolsius =

Dutch footballer (born 1998)

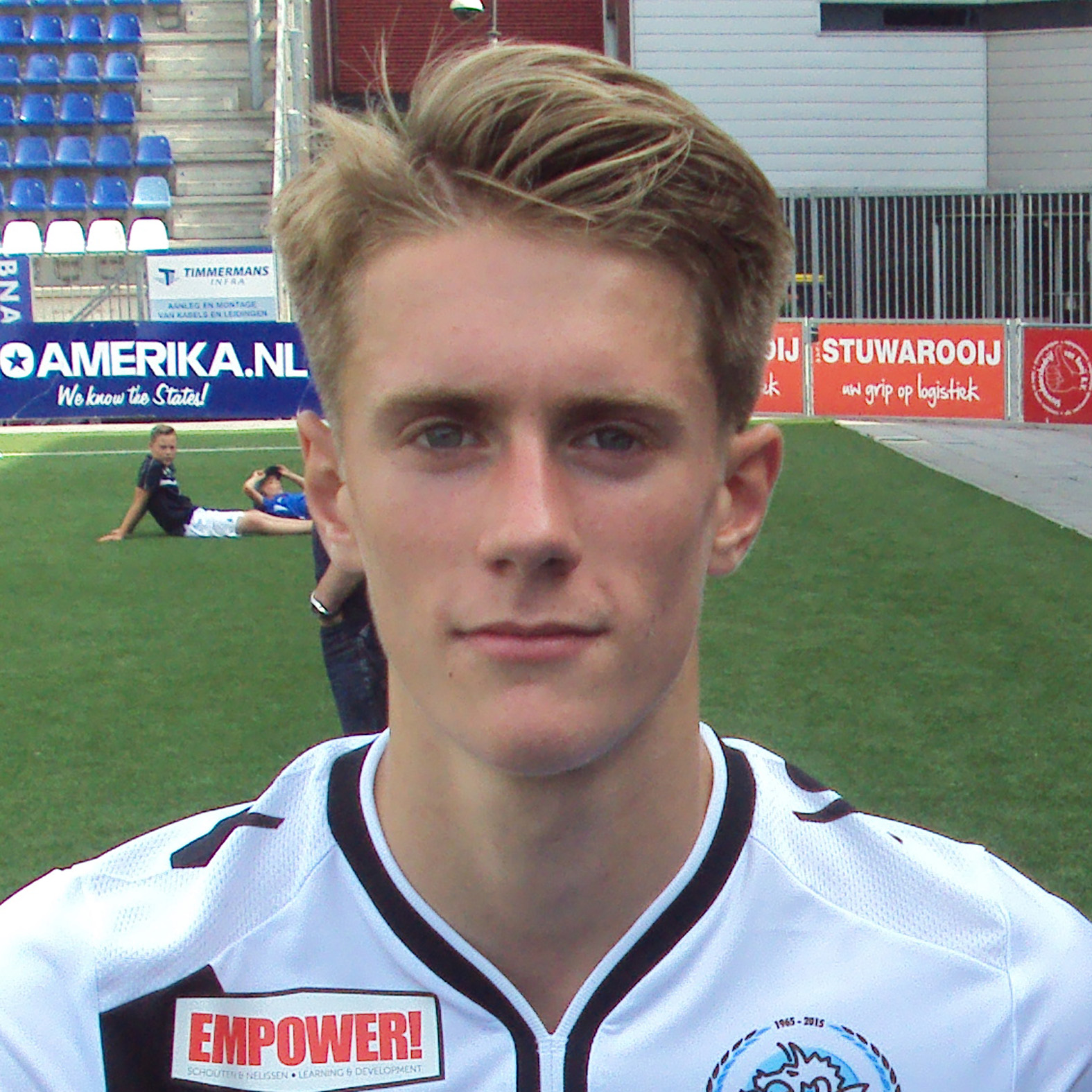

Personal information
- Full name: Don José Henricus Bolsius
- Date of birth: 29 November 1998 (age 27)
- Place of birth: 's-Hertogenbosch, Netherlands
- Height: 1.75 m (5 ft 9 in)
- Position: Winger

Team information
- Current team: Ascoli
- Number: 77

Youth career
- Den Bosch
- 2014–2016: Brabant United

Senior career*
Years	Team	Apps	(Gls)
2016–2018	Den Bosch	3	(0)
2016–2017	Jong Den Bosch	9	(3)
2018–2020	Kozakken Boys	41	(4)
2020–2021	Den Bosch	27	(0)
2021–2022	Fermana	13	(1)
2022	→ Campobasso (loan)	11	(3)
2022–2023	Fidelis Andria	37	(8)
2023–2024	Benevento	26	(3)
2024–2026	Sorrento	31	(5)
2026	Perugia	12	(1)
2026–	Ascoli	1	(0)
- * Club domestic league appearances and goals as of 23 August 2026

Don José Henricus Bolsius (born 29 November 1998) is a Dutch professional footballer who plays as a winger for Serie B club Ascoli.

== Career ==
Bolsius made his professional debut in the Eerste Divisie for FC Den Bosch on 21 October 2016 in a game against VVV-Venlo.

After having impressed with Kozakken Boys in the Tweede Divisie – a club he had moved to in 2018 – Bolsius rejoined Den Bosch in the summer of 2020. He made 28 appearances during the 2020–21 season, of which the majority was as a substitute. His contract was not extended after the season, making him a free agent.

On 15 July 2021, he signed a two-year contract with Serie C club Fermana. On 31 January 2022, Bolsius joined Campobasso on loan.

On 18 July 2022, Bolsius moved to Fidelis Andria.

On 4 July 2023, he signed with Benevento.

On 25 July 2024, Bolsius joined Sorrento.
