= Beccaro =

Beccaro is an Italian surname derived from the occupation of butcher. Notable people with the surname include:

- Luca Beccaro, Italian canoeist
- Marco Beccaro, Italian footballer
- Thierry Beccaro, French broadcaster
