= Alberto Paleari =

Italian footballer (born 1992)

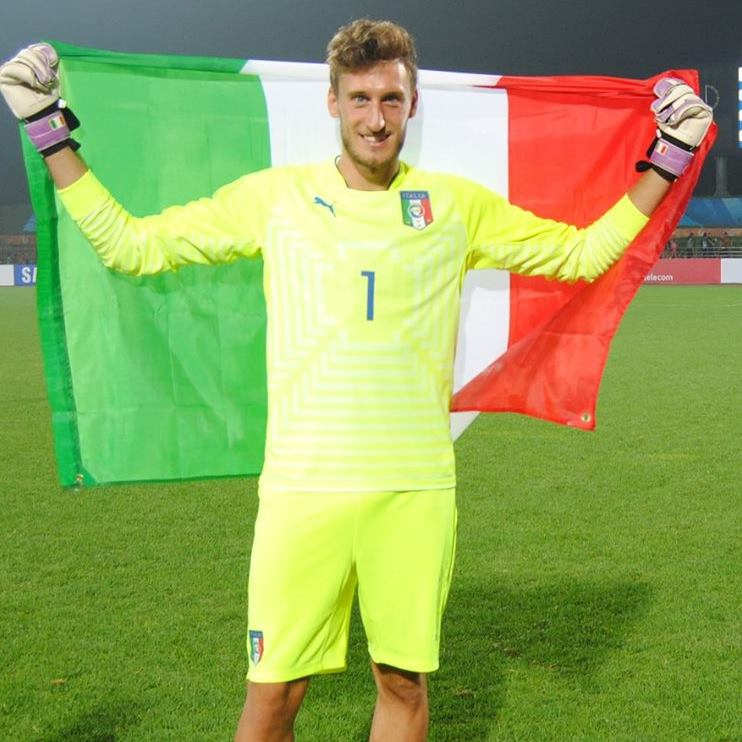
- Paleari in 2015

Personal information
- Full name: Alberto Andrea Paleari
- Date of birth: 29 August 1992 (age 34)
- Place of birth: Giussano, Italy
- Height: 1.93 m (6 ft 4 in)
- Position: Goalkeeper

Team information
- Current team: AEK Larnaca

Youth career
- 2008–2011: AC Milan

Senior career*
| Years | Team | Apps | (Gls) |
| 2008–2011 | AC Milan | 0 | (0) |
| 2011–2012 | Ponte San Pietro | 37 | (0) |
| 2012–2013 | Tritium | 7 | (0) |
| 2013–2014 | Virtus Verona | 34 | (0) |
| 2014–2015 | Mantova | 1 | (0) |
| 2015–2016 | Giana Erminio | 39 | (0) |
| 2016–2021 | Cittadella | 93 | (0) |
| 2020–2021 | → Genoa (loan) | 3 | (0) |
| 2021–2022 | Genoa | 0 | (0) |
| 2021–2022 | → Benevento (loan) | 35 | (0) |
| 2022–2024 | Benevento | 68 | (0) |
| 2024–2026 | Torino | 30 | (0) |
| 2026– | AEK Larnaca | 30 | (0) |

International career
| 2013–2015 | Italy U20 | 5 | (0) |
Medal record
Representing Italy
Summer Universiade
| Gold medal – first place | 2015 Gwangju |
- * Club domestic league appearances and goals as of 25 May 2026

Alberto Andrea Paleari (born 29 August 1992) is an Italian professional footballer who plays as a goalkeeper for AEK Larnaca.

== Club career ==
=== AC Milan ===
Born in Giussano, Lombardy, Paleari started his career at hometown club Seregno. In June 2008 he signed for Serie A club AC Milan. He was the starting keeper of Primavera under-20 team from the 2008–09 season to 2010–11 season. In 2010, he was second graded in the Italian championship losing the last match against Atalanta. In 2011, he was promoted to the senior squad, coached by Massimiliano Allegri, choosing to wear the number 61.

=== Ponte San Pietro ===
In August 2011, Paleari signed for Serie D club Ponte San Pietro. In the 2011–12 season he played 37 matches for the club.

=== Tritium ===
In summer 2012, he left for Lega Pro Prima Divisione club Tritium.

=== Virtus Verona ===
In 2013, he moved to Lega Pro Seconda Divisione club Virtus Verona. He played 34 matches and won the award for "Best Goalkeeper of the Year", announced by the three most important national sports daily newspapers.

=== Mantova ===
In July 2014, he moved to Lega Pro club Mantova, where he collected two matches in Coppa Italia.

=== Giana Erminio ===
In 2015, Paleari moved to fellow Lega Pro club Giana Erminio.

=== Cittadella ===
In 2016 he joined Serie B club Cittadella, where he played until 2021.

=== Genoa ===
On 2 October 2020, he joined Serie A club Genoa, on loan with an obligation to buy. He made his debut on 30 November 2020 in a Serie A match against Parma.

=== Benevento ===
On 17 July 2021, he moved to Serie B club Benevento, on loan with an option to buy and a conditional obligation to buy. On 17 June 2022, Benevento exercised their option to buy.

=== Torino ===
On 19 July 2024, Paleari signed a contract with Serie A club Torino for two seasons, with an option for a third. He went on to play one Serie A match under head coach Paolo Vanoli during the 2024–25 season, his first with the club.

== International career ==
Paleari was part of Italy squad at 2013 and 2015 Summer Universiade. In 2013, he played with no. 22 and in 2015 with no. 1. In the 2015 edition, Paleari and his teammates won the gold medal against South of Korea.

== Career statistics ==
As of match played 14 May 2026

Appearances and goals by club, season and competition
| Club | Season | League | | | Cup | | Other | | Total | |
| Club | Season | Division | Apps | Goals | Apps | Goals | Apps | Goals | Apps | Goals |
|---|---|---|---|---|---|---|---|---|---|---|
| Tritium | 2012–13 | Lega Pro 1D | 7 | 0 | 4 | 0 | 0 | 0 | 11 | 0 |
| Virtus Verona | 2013–14 | Lega Pro 2D | 34 | 0 | 0 | 0 | — | | 34 | 0 |
| Mantova | 2014–15 | Lega Pro | 1 | 0 | 2 | 0 | — | | 3 | 0 |
| Giana Erminio | 2014–15 | Lega Pro | 17 | 0 | — | | — | | 17 | 0 |
| Giana Erminio | 2015–16 | Lega Pro | 22 | 0 | 1 | 0 | — | | 23 | 0 |
| Giana Erminio | Total | | 39 | 0 | 1 | 0 | — | | 40 | 0 |
| Cittadella | 2016–17 | Serie B | 2 | 0 | 1 | 0 | 0 | 0 | 3 | 0 |
| Cittadella | 2017–18 | Serie B | 13 | 0 | 4 | 0 | 0 | 0 | 17 | 0 |
| Cittadella | 2018–19 | Serie B | 36 | 0 | 2 | 0 | 5 | 0 | 43 | 0 |
| Cittadella | 2019–20 | Serie B | 36 | 0 | 1 | 0 | 1 | 0 | 38 | 0 |
| Cittadella | 2020–21 | Serie B | 0 | 0 | 1 | 0 | — | | 1 | 0 |
| Cittadella | Total | | 87 | 0 | 9 | 0 | 6 | 0 | 102 | 0 |
| Genoa (loan) | 2020–21 | Serie A | 3 | 0 | 1 | 0 | — | | 4 | 0 |
| Benevento (loan) | 2021–22 | Serie B | 35 | 0 | 1 | 0 | 3 | 0 | 39 | 0 |
| Benevento | 2022–23 | Serie B | 33 | 0 | 1 | 0 | — | | 34 | 0 |
| Benevento | 2023–24 | Serie C | 35 | 0 | 0 | 0 | 6 | 0 | 41 | 0 |
| Benevento | Total | | 103 | 0 | 2 | 0 | 9 | 0 | 114 | 0 |
| Torino | 2024–25 | Serie A | 1 | 0 | 0 | 0 | — | | 1 | 0 |
| Torino | 2025–26 | Serie A | 29 | 0 | 3 | 0 | — | | 32 | 0 |
| Torino | Total | | 30 | 0 | 3 | 0 | — | | 33 | 0 |
| Career total | | | 304 | 0 | 22 | 0 | 15 | 0 | 341 | 0 |
