= Krzysztof Kubica =

Polish footballer

Personal information
- Date of birth: 25 May 2000 (age 26)
- Place of birth: Żywiec, Poland
- Height: 1.93 m (6 ft 4 in)
- Position: Midfielder

Team information
- Current team: Bruk-Bet Termalica
- Number: 13

Youth career
- 2012–2014: Koszarawa Żywiec
- 2014–2017: Czarni-Góral Żywiec

Senior career*
Years	Team	Apps	(Gls)
2017–2018	Czarni-Góral Żywiec	5	(1)
2018–2022	Górnik Zabrze II	41	(4)
2018–2022	Górnik Zabrze	56	(9)
2019–2020	→ Chrobry Głogów (loan)	17	(2)
2022–2025	Benevento	25	(1)
2024–2025	→ Motor Lublin (loan)	5	(0)
2025–	Bruk-Bet Termalica	39	(8)

International career
2018–2019	Poland U19	4	(0)
2021–2022	Poland U21	3	(1)
- * Club domestic league appearances and goals as of 21:44, 25 May 2026 (UTC)

Krzysztof Kubica (born 25 May 2000) is a Polish professional footballer who plays as a midfielder for I liga club Bruk-Bet Termalica Nieciecza.

== Career ==
On 29 August 2022, Serie B side Benevento announced the signing of Kubica for an undisclosed fee.

On 3 July 2024, Kubica joined Polish Ekstraklasa returnees Motor Lublin on a season-long loan, with an option to make the move permanent. On 11 January 2025, he left Motor and terminated his contract with Benevento by mutual consent.

One day later, he joined I liga club Bruk-Bet Termalica Nieciecza on a two-and-a-half year deal, with an extension clause for a further year, reuniting with his former Górnik manager Marcin Brosz.

== Career statistics ==
As of match played 11 April 2026

Appearances and goals by club, season and competition
Club	Season	League			National cup (Note: Includes Polish Cup)		Continental		Other		Total	
Club	Season	Division	Apps	Goals	Apps	Goals	Apps	Goals	Apps	Goals	Apps	Goals
Czarni-Góral Żywiec	2016–17	Regional league	1	0	—		—		—		1	0
Czarni-Góral Żywiec	2017–18	Regional league	4	1	—		—		—		4	1
Czarni-Góral Żywiec	Total		5	1	—		—		—		5	1
Górnik Zabrze II	2017–18	III liga, gr. III	15	2	—		—		—		23	0
Górnik Zabrze II	2018–19	III liga, gr. III	21	2	—		—		—		21	2
Górnik Zabrze II	2019–20	III liga, gr. III	4	0	—		—		—		4	0
Górnik Zabrze II	2022–23	III liga, gr. III	1	0	—		—		—		1	0
Górnik Zabrze II	Total		41	4	—		—		—		41	4
Chrobry Głogów (loan)	2019–20	I liga	17	2	0	0	—		—		17	2
Górnik Zabrze	2020–21	Ekstraklasa	22	0	1	0	—		—		23	0
Górnik Zabrze	2021–22	Ekstraklasa	30	9	4	0	—		—		34	9
Górnik Zabrze	2022–23	Ekstraklasa	4	0	0	0	—		—		4	0
Górnik Zabrze	Total		56	9	5	0	—		—		61	9
Benevento	2022–23	Serie B	14	0	0	0	—		0	0	14	0
Benevento	2023–24	Serie C	11	1	0	0	—		1 (Note: Appearance in Coppa Italia Serie C)	0	12	1
Benevento	Total		25	1	0	0	—		1	0	26	1
Motor Lublin (loan)	2024–25	Ekstraklasa	5	0	0	0	—		—		5	0
Bruk-Bet Termalica	2024–25	I liga	14	3	—		—		—		14	3
Bruk-Bet Termalica	2025–26	Ekstraklasa	25	5	1	0	—		—		26	5
Bruk-Bet Termalica	Total		39	8	1	0	—		—		40	8
Career total			188	25	6	0	0	0	1	0	195	25

== Honours ==
Individual

- Ekstraklasa Young Player of the Month: August 2021, May 2022
