= Stadio Nuovo Romagnoli =

Football stadium in Campobasso, Italy

Stadio Antonio Molinari
- Selvapiana
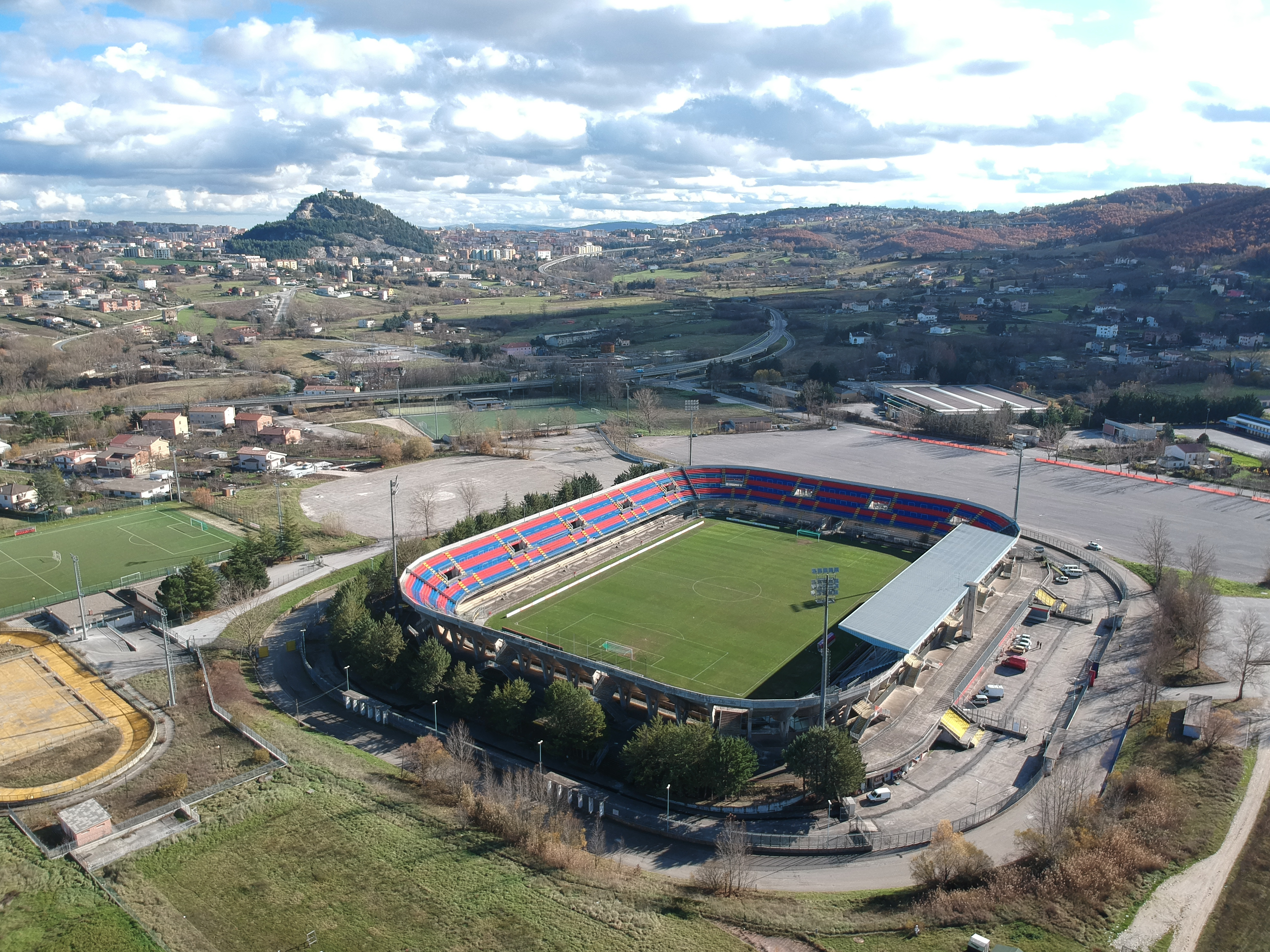
- Interactive map of Stadio Antonio Molinari
- Location: Campobasso, Italy
- Coordinates: 41°34′12.1″N 14°37′50.9″E
- Owner: City of Campobasso
- Capacity: 21,800 (4,000 approved)
- Surface: Grass

Construction
- Groundbreaking: 1983
- Opened: 1985
- Architect: Costantino Rozzi

Tenant
- Campobasso FC

Stadio Antonio Molinari, formerly known as Stadio Nuovo Romagnoli and also commonly referred to as Selvapiana, is a sports stadium located in Campobasso, the capital of the Molise region in Italy. It is primarily used for association football. The stadium currently hosts the home matches of Campobasso FC who plays in the Serie C.

== History ==
The Stadio Nuovo Romagnoli was designed by former Ascoli Calcio 1898 chairman Constantino Rozzi, who also designed numerous other stadiums across Italy. Work started on the stadium in 1983, and Stadio Nuovo Romagnoli was officially opened on 13 February 1985, when Campobasso defeated Juventus FC 1–0 in a Coppa Italia match.

The structure of the stadium is very similar to that of the Stadio Ciro Vigorito in Benevento, due to the same project and some of the same architects being involved in the Romagnoli's design. The stadium is called "New Romagnoli" because Campobasso's previous stadium was named after Giovanni Romagnoli. However, the stadium has not yet received an official name. There has been talk of naming the stadium after Michele Scorrano, Campobasso's captain in the 1970s and 1980s, who died after a heart attack in February 2009.

After SSC Napoli's Stadio San Paolo was damaged by a violent storm, Stadio Nuovo Romagnoli hosted the club's home matches between September 2001 and January 2002.

On 3 June 2003, the stadium hosted a friendly match between Italy and Northern Ireland, which Italy won 2–0. The game was organized to raise funds for reconstruction and victims after an earthquake hit Molise, where the stadium is based, in 2002.

After S.S. Campobasso was taken under new ownership in 2018, the Stadium was given some upgrades including painting the seats with red and blue stripes. As well as upgrades to various other areas.

== Concerts ==
- Antonello Venditti, 22 September 1990
- Litfiba, 30 August 1991
- Pino Daniele, 28 July 1997
- Subsonica, 26 September 2002
