= Mattia Capoferri =

Italian footballer

Personal information
- Date of birth: 30 May 2001 (age 25)
- Place of birth: Esine, Italy
- Height: 1.87 m (6 ft 2 in)
- Position: Defender

Team information
- Current team: Campobasso
- Number: 33

Youth career
- A.S.D. Futura Calcio
- AlbinoLeffe
- –2020: Brescia

Senior career*
Years	Team	Apps	(Gls)
2020–2022	Brescia	0	(0)
2020–2021	→ Lecco (loan)	31	(1)
2022	→ Lecco (loan)	13	(0)
2022–2023	Piacenza	24	(1)
2023–2026	Pergolettese	70	(1)
2026–	Campobasso	1	(0)
- * Club domestic league appearances and goals as of 23 August 2026

Mattia Capoferri (born 30 May 2001) is an Italian footballer who plays as defender for Serie C Group B club Campobasso.

== Career ==
=== Early career ===
Capoferri played for A.S.D. Futura Calcio, then moved to AlbinoLeffe and finally in the youth teams of Brescia. He made 18 appearances and scored two goals for the under–19s.

=== Career ===
In 2020, he moved on loan to Lecco. He made his debut with Lecco on 27 September 2020, in the home 1–0 victory against Giana Erminio.

On 5 January 2022, he returned to Lecco on another loan until the end of the 2021–22 season.

On 30 August 2022, Capoferri signed a three-year contract with Piacenza.

On 6 July 2023, Capoferri moved to Pergolettese on a two-year contract.
