= Alessandro Galeandro =

Italian footballer (born 2000)

Personal information
- Date of birth: 29 February 2000 (age 26)
- Place of birth: Sesto San Giovanni, Italy
- Height: 1.80 m (5 ft 11 in)
- Position: Forward

Team information
- Current team: Campobasso
- Number: 92

Youth career
- –2011: Aldini Calcio
- 2011–2018: AlbinoLeffe

Senior career*
Years	Team	Apps	(Gls)
2018–2022	AlbinoLeffe	83	(10)
2022–2023	Alessandria	37	(8)
2023–2026	Lecco	53	(5)
2023–2024	→ Gubbio (loan)	7	(2)
2026	→ Giana Erminio (loan)	17	(6)
2026–	Campobasso	4	(0)
- * Club domestic league appearances and goals as of 26 September 2026

Alessandro Galeandro (born 29 February 2000) is an Italian professional footballer who plays as a forward for Serie C Group B club Campobasso.

== Career ==
=== AlbinoLeffe ===
In December 2017, following nearly seven years in the club's youth system, Galeandro signed his first professional contract with the club, a two-and-a-half-year deal. Galeandro made his competitive debut on 4 November 2018, coming on as an 88th minute substitute for Juri Gonzi in a 1–1 draw with Fano.

=== Alessandria ===
On 19 August 2022, Galeandro signed a two-year deal with Alessandria.

=== International ===
Galeandro was part of the Italy squad that earned Bronze at the 2019 Summer Universiade.
