= Lorenzo Carfora =

Italian footballer (born 2006)

Personal information
- Date of birth: 11 January 2006 (age 20)
- Place of birth: Naples, Italy
- Height: 1.67 m (5 ft 6 in)
- Position: Attacking midfielder

Team information
- Current team: Campobasso (on loan from Benevento)
- Number: 11

Youth career
- A.S.D. Quartieri Giovanili
- –2020: Portici
- 2020–2023: Benevento

Senior career*
Years	Team	Apps	(Gls)
2023–	Benevento	41	(2)
2026–	→ Campobasso (loan)	1	(0)

International career^{‡}
2022	Italy U17	1	(0)
2023	Italy U18	3	(0)
- * Club domestic league appearances and goals as of 29 August 2026 ‡ National team caps and goals as of 19 November 2023

Lorenzo Carfora (born 11 January 2006) is an Italian professional footballer who plays as an attacking midfielder for Serie C Group B club Campobasso, on loan from Benevento.

== Club career ==
Born in Naples and raised in San Giorgio a Cremano, Carfora played for grassroots club A.S.D. Quartieri Giovanili and Portici before joining Benevento's youth academy in the summer of 2020.

During the 2022–23 season, following his performances for the under-17 team, as well an injury crisis within the first team, Carfora was promoted to Benevento's senior squad under head coach Roberto Stellone. On 1 March 2023, he made his professional debut, coming on as a substitute for Daam Foulon at half-time of a 0–2 league defeat to Südtirol. At 17 years and 53 days, he became the club's second youngest player to ever feature in a Serie B match, behind only Siriki Sanogo; he also became the first player born in 2006 to feature in the Italian second tier. In March 2023, he took part in the Viareggio Cup with Benevento's under-19 squad.

On 1 April 2023, Carfora made his first start in a 2–0 league defeat to Bari. In the process, he became the first 2006-born player to start a game in any Italian professional league. He went on to be a part of the team that suffered relegation to Serie C at the end of the season. In July 2023, he agreed to his first professional contract with Benevento, signing a three-year deal.

== International career ==
Carfora has represented Italy at youth international level: after taking part in a training camp with the Italian under-17 national team in November 2022, he made his debut for the side in December of the same year.

== Style of play ==
Carfora is an attacking midfielder, who can also play as a winger, a second striker or a mezzala.

An ambidextrous and tactically intelligent player, he has been regarded for his technical skills, his balance, his work rate and his creativity. He has been compared to Tommaso Baldanzi.

== Career statistics ==
=== Club ===
As of 6 May 2023

Appearances and goals by club, season and competition
Club	Season	League			National cup		Other		Total	
Club	Season	Division	Apps	Goals	Apps	Goals	Apps	Goals	Apps	Goals
Benevento	2022–23	Serie B	8	0	0	0	0	0	8	0
Career total			8	0	0	0	0	0	8	0
