= Nermin Karić =

Swedish footballer (born 1999)

Personal information
- Date of birth: 23 July 1999 (age 27)
- Place of birth: Marielund, Norrköping, Sweden
- Height: 1.83 m (6 ft 0 in)
- Position: Midfielder

Team information
- Current team: Juve Stabia
- Number: 17

Youth career
- –2017: IF Sylvia
- 2017–2019: Genoa

Senior career*
Years	Team	Apps	(Gls)
2019–2020	Genoa	0	(0)
2019–2020	→ Avellino (loan)	13	(1)
2020–2021	Südtirol	34	(4)
2021–2022	Virtus Entella	35	(3)
2022–2024	Benevento	57	(2)
2024–2025	Trapani	19	(1)
2025	→ Virtus Entella (loan)	15	(1)
2025–2026	Virtus Entella	35	(3)
2026–	Juve Stabia	1	(0)

International career^{‡}
2017–2018	Sweden U19	4	(0)
- * Club domestic league appearances and goals as of 23 August 2026 ‡ National team caps and goals as of 27 March 2018

Nermin Karić (born 23 June 1999) is a Swedish professional footballer who plays as a defensive midfielder for Serie B club Juve Stabia.

== Club career ==
=== The beginnings: Genoa and Avellino ===
Born in Marielund in Norrköping, Karić started his career in the youth ranks of IF Sylvia, before moving to the Serie A team Genoa in the summer of 2017. He played for Genoa's Under-19 squad in the 2017–18 and 2018–19 season, but he never featured for the senior squad.

On 22 August 2019, Karić joined Serie C club Avellino on a season-long loan.

He subsequently made his professional debut for Avellino on 7 September 2019, during a game against Teramo. He substituted Julián Illanes in the 70th minute and scored his first professional goal 4 minutes later, establishing the final score of 2–0.

=== Südtirol ===
On 13 August 2020, Karić joined fellow Serie C club Südtirol and signed a three-year contract.

He immediately established himself as a regular starter within the Tyrolean team, becoming one of the most highly-rated young midfielders in the league and helping his side reaching the promotion play-offs, where Südtirol eventually lost on aggregate to Karić's former team Avellino in the quarter-finals.

The midfielder played his last game for Südtirol on August 28, 2021, coming in as a substitute for Marco Beccaro in the 62nd minute of the 1-0 win against Virtus Verona, the opening game of the 2021-22 season of Serie C.

=== Virtus Entella ===
On 31 August 2021, the deadline day of the summer transfer window, it was announced that Karić had agreed to join Virtus Entella on a permanent basis, thus setting himself for his third consecutive experience in Serie C.

=== Benevento ===
On 5 July 2022, Karić joined Serie B side Benevento.
