= Christian Pastina =

Italian footballer (born 2001)

Personal information
- Full name: Christian Diego Pastina
- Date of birth: 15 February 2001 (age 25)
- Place of birth: Battipaglia, Italy
- Height: 1.85 m (6 ft 1 in)
- Position: Defender

Team information
- Current team: Padova
- Number: 58

Youth career
- 2016–2017: Avellino
- 2017–2019: Benevento

Senior career*
Years	Team	Apps	(Gls)
2019–2024	Benevento	56	(3)
2025–	Padova	10	(1)
- * Club domestic league appearances and goals as of 13 May 2026

Christian Diego Pastina (born 15 February 2001) is an Italian professional footballer who plays as a defender for Serie B club Padova.

== Club career ==
Pastina made his Serie A debut for Benevento on 9 January 2021.

On 29 July 2024, he was banned from playing for two years for betting. His contract with Benevento was mutually terminated on 7 November 2024.

On 4 July 2025, Pastina signed a three-season contract with Padova in Serie B.
