= Andrea Corbari =

Italian professional footballer (born 1994)

Personal information
- Date of birth: 26 April 1994 (age 32)
- Place of birth: Cremona, Italia
- Height: 1.83 m (6 ft 0 in)
- Position: Midfielder

Team information
- Current team: Catania
- Number: 30

Senior career*
Years	Team	Apps	(Gls)
2015–2018	USD Pallavicino	+57	(23)
2018–2020	Fiorenzuola	41	(6)
2020–2022	Piacenza	54	(14)
2022–2025	Virtus Entella	100	(16)
2025–	Catania	32	(1)
- * Club domestic league appearances and goals as of 1 May 2026

Andrea Corbari (born 26 April 1994) is an Italian professional footballer who plays as a midfielder for Serie C Group C club Catania.

== Club career ==
Born in Cremona, Corbari started his career on amateur USD Pallavicino.

In 2020 he joined to Serie C club Piacenza. He was named captain of the team. On 12 February 2021, he renewed his contract still 2023. In December 2021, Corbari suffered an ACL injury which kept him off the field for the remainder of the 2021–22 season.

On 15 July 2022, Corbari signed with Virtus Entella.
