= Pier Luigi Simonetti =

Italian footballer

Personal information
- Date of birth: 4 January 2001 (age 25)
- Place of birth: Rome, Italy
- Height: 1.80 m (5 ft 11 in)
- Position: Midfielder

Team information
- Current team: Benevento
- Number: 18

Youth career
- Roma

Senior career*
Years	Team	Apps	(Gls)
2020–2022	Piacenza	43	(1)
2022	Catania	13	(2)
2022–2023	Ancona	36	(6)
2023–	Benevento	67	(12)
- * Club domestic league appearances and goals as of 1 May 2026

Pier Luigi Simonetti (born 4 January 2001) is an Italian professional footballer who plays as a midfielder for Serie B club Benevento.

== Club career ==
Born in Rome, Simonetti was formed as a player in Roma youth system.

On 17 September 2020, he joined Serie C club Piacenza. On 19 January 2022, his contract with Piacenza was terminated by mutual consent.

On 21 January 2022, he signed with Catania until the end of the 2021–22 season. On 9 April 2022, he was released together with all of his Catania teammates following the club's exclusion from Italian football due to its inability to overcome a number of financial issues.

On 14 June 2022, Simonetti signed with Ancona-Matelica.

On 1 September 2023, Simonetti moved to Benevento. In December 2025, Simonetti was awarded as player of the month in Serie C Group C with four goals and one assist in three games.

== Personal life ==
His sister Flaminia is also a footballer.
