= Davide Munari =

Italian footballer (born 2000)

Personal information
- Date of birth: 27 January 2000 (age 26)
- Place of birth: Asiago, Italy
- Height: 1.81 m (5 ft 11 in)
- Position: Midfielder

Youth career
- –2017: Bassano
- 2017–2020: Torino

Senior career*
Years	Team	Apps	(Gls)
2019	→ Cesena (loan)	16	(1)
2020–2022	Cesena	23	(1)
2022	→ Piacenza (loan)	18	(1)
2022–2023	Piacenza	25	(0)
2023–2025	AlbinoLeffe	61	(2)
2025–2026	Cavese	31	(2)
- * Club domestic league appearances and goals as of 1 May 2026

Davide Munari (born 27 January 2000) is an Italian professional footballer who plays as a midfielder.

== Club career ==
Born in Asiago, Munari started his career on Bassano and Torino youth system.

On 5 January 2019, he was loaned to Serie D club Cesena, on this team he made his senior debut.

He returned to Torino the next season, stil 1 February 2020 Munari signed for Cesena.

On 21 January 2022, he moved on loan to Piacenza. On 15 June 2022, Piacenza exercised their option to buy.

On 12 July 2023, Munari signed with AlbinoLeffe.

In July 2026, Munari was suspended for two years for violating doping rules and his Cavese contract was terminated.
