= Riccardo Capellini =

Italian footballer (born 2000)

Personal information
- Date of birth: 1 March 2000 (age 26)
- Place of birth: Cremona, Italy
- Height: 1.85 m (6 ft 1 in)
- Position: Centre-back

Team information
- Current team: Pescara
- Number: 2

Youth career
- –2015: Cremonese
- 2015–2019: Juventus

Senior career*
Years	Team	Apps	(Gls)
2019–2022	Juventus	0	(0)
2019–2020	→ Pistoiese (loan)	17	(0)
2020–2021	→ Juventus U23 (res.)	24	(0)
2021–2022	→ Mirandés (loan)	21	(0)
2022–2025	Benevento	72	(4)
2025–	Pescara	34	(1)
- * Club domestic league appearances and goals as of 13 May 2026

Riccardo Capellini (born 1 March 2000) is an Italian professional footballer who plays as a centre-back for Serie C Group B club Pescara.

== Club career ==
=== Juventus ===
He joined Juventus in June 2015. He eventually joined their Under-19 side and participated in Campionato Primavera 1 and also 2017–18 and 2018–19 editions of the UEFA Youth League. He was also included for the 2018–19 Serie C squad of Juventus U23, but did not see any time on the field for them that season.

==== Loan to Pistoiese ====
On 22 August 2019, he joined Serie C club Pistoiese on a season-long loan. He made his professional Serie C debut for Pistoiese on 25 August 2019 in a game against AlbinoLeffe, substituting Paolo Dametto in the 69th minute. He made his first start on 1 September 2019 against Pergolettese.

==== Juventus U23 ====
Capellini's first game for Juventus U23 came on 3 October 2020, in a 2–1 win over Giana Erminio.

==== Loan to Mirandés ====
On 20 July 2021, Capellini was loaned to Spanish side Mirandés in the Segunda División.

=== Benevento ===
On 21 June 2022, Capellini left Juventus to join Benevento.

=== Pescara ===
On 10 September 2025, Capellini signed with Pescara for one season, with an option for two more seasons.
