= Edoardo Masciangelo =

Italian footballer (born 1996)

Personal information
- Date of birth: 8 July 1996 (age 30)
- Place of birth: Rome, Italy
- Height: 1.77 m (5 ft 10 in)
- Position: Left back

Team information
- Current team: Catania
- Number: 32

Youth career
- –2014: Roma
- 2014–2015: Fiorentina

Senior career*
Years	Team	Apps	(Gls)
2015–2017	Arezzo	30	(0)
2017–2018	Piacenza	38	(1)
2018–2019	Lugano	15	(0)
2019	→ Juventus U23 (loan)	13	(0)
2019–2020	Juventus	0	(0)
2019–2020	→ Pescara (loan)	14	(0)
2020–2022	Pescara	29	(0)
2021–2022	→ Benevento (loan)	22	(0)
2022–2024	Benevento	44	(1)
2023	→ Palermo (loan)	4	(0)
2024–2025	Cittadella	34	(1)
2025–2026	Frosinone	9	(0)
2026–	Catania	0	(0)
- * Club domestic league appearances and goals as of 23 August 2026

Edoardo Masciangelo (born 8 July 1996) is an Italian professional footballer who plays as a left-back for Serie C Group C club Catania.

== Club career ==
Masciangelo is a youth product of the Roma and Fiorentina youth academies. He joined Arezzo in the Serie C, and after 2 seasons joined Piacenza in 2017.

After a successful 2017–18 season with Piacenza where he was considered one of the best young players in the Serie C, Masciangelo transferred to FC Lugano in the Swiss Super League. Masciangelo made his professional debut for Lugano in a 2–1 Swiss Super League win over FC Sion on 22 July 2018.

On 27 January 2019, Masciangelo joined to Juventus U23 on loan with an obligation to buy until 30 June 2019.

After Juventus bought out his rights, on 30 August 2019 he joined Pescara on loan. On 24 January 2020, Pescara made the transfer permanent.

On 21 July 2021, he joined Benevento on loan with an obligation to buy.

On 31 January 2023, Masciangelo was loaned out to fellow Serie B club Palermo until the end of the season, with an option to buy.

On 19 July 2025, Masciangelo signed with Frosinone in Serie B.
