= Luca Pizzul =

Italian footballer

Personal information
- Date of birth: 31 March 1999 (age 27)
- Place of birth: Trieste, Italy
- Height: 1.80 m (5 ft 11 in)
- Position: Left back

Team information
- Current team: Mestre
- Number: 4

Youth career
- Udinese

Senior career*
Years	Team	Apps	(Gls)
2016–2020	Triestina	69	(1)
2019–2020	→ Renate (loan)	15	(1)
2020–2022	Pro Patria	59	(0)
2022–	Mestre	0	(0)
- * Club domestic league appearances and goals as of 18 September 2022

Luca Pizzul (born 31 March 1999) is an Italian professional footballer who plays as a left back for Serie D club Mestre.

== Club career ==
Formed on Udinese youth system, in 2016 Pizzul joined Serie D club Triestina.

On 6 July 2019, he was loaned to Renate.

On 15 September 2020, he joined Serie C club Pro Patria.
