= Simone Rabbi =

Italian footballer (born 2001)

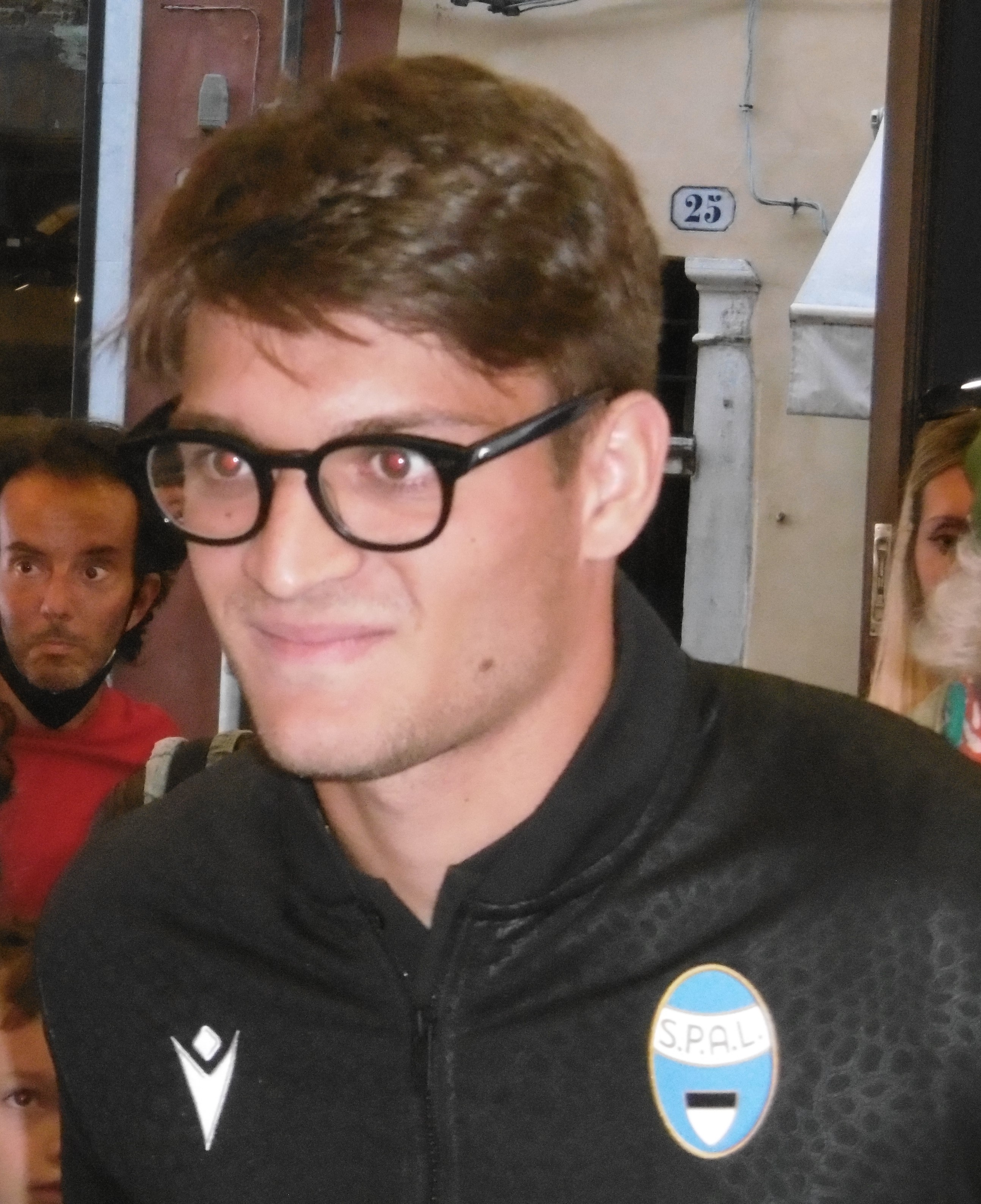

Personal information
- Date of birth: 30 October 2001 (age 25)
- Place of birth: Bologna, Italy
- Height: 1.80 m (5 ft 11 in)
- Position: Forward

Team information
- Current team: Ravenna
- Number: 9

Youth career
- Bologna

Senior career*
Years	Team	Apps	(Gls)
2020–2022	Bologna	4	(0)
2021–2022	→ Piacenza (loan)	34	(5)
2022–2024	SPAL	54	(4)
2024–2026	Cittadella	68	(15)
2026–	Ravenna	0	(0)

International career^{‡}
2018	Italy U18	3	(1)
- * Club domestic league appearances and goals as of 29 April 2026 ‡ National team caps and goals as of 7 September 2018

Simone Rabbi (born 30 October 2001) is an Italian football player who plays as a forward for Serie C Group B club Ravenna.

== Club career ==
He was raised in the youth teams of Bologna and started playing for their Under-19 squad in the 2018–19 season.

He made his debut for Bologna's senior squad on 25 November 2020 in a Coppa Italia game against Spezia. He made his Serie A debut on 5 December 2020 against Inter.

On 26 August 2021, he was loaned to Serie C club Piacenza.

On 30 June 2022, Rabbi signed a four-year contract with SPAL. On 30 July 2024, SPAL and Rabbi terminated their contract by mutual consent.

The day after terminating his contract with SPAL, Rabbi joined Serie B side, Cittadella.

== International career ==
He was first called up to represent his country in August 2018 for Under-18 team friendlies.
