= Mattia Viviani =

Italian footballer

Personal information
- Date of birth: 4 September 2000 (age 26)
- Place of birth: Brescia, Italy
- Height: 1.87 m (6 ft 2 in)
- Position: Midfielder

Team information
- Current team: Arezzo
- Number: 23

Youth career
- Brescia

Senior career*
Years	Team	Apps	(Gls)
2018–2020	Brescia	16	(0)
2020–2021	Chievo	31	(0)
2021–2026	Benevento	66	(4)
2023–2024	→ Cosenza (loan)	15	(0)
2026–	Arezzo	7	(0)

International career^{‡}
2018	Italy U-19	1	(0)
2021	Italy U-20	1	(0)
- * Club domestic league appearances and goals as of 26 April 2026 ‡ National team caps and goals as of 6 June 2021

Mattia Viviani (born 4 September 2000) is an Italian football player who plays for Serie B club Arezzo.

== Club career ==
He is a product of Brescia youth teams. On 22 March 2018, he signed his first professional contract with Brescia at the age of 17 for a three-year term.

Two days later, on 24 March 2018, he made his Serie A debut for Brescia in a game against Bari as a starter, before being substituted at half-time by Andrea Caracciolo.

On 14 December 2019 he did his Serie A debut against Lecce.

On 5 October 2020 he signed a three-year contract with Chievo. Chievo went bankrupt at the end of the 2020–21 season, making him a free agent.

On 15 September 2021, Viviani signed with Benevento. On 19 August 2023, Viviani moved on loan to Cosenza, with an option to buy.

== International ==
In September 2018, he was called up to Italy national under-19 football team for two friendlies.
