= Leonardo Galli =

Italian footballer

Personal information
- Date of birth: 3 July 1997 (age 29)
- Place of birth: Cremona, Italy
- Height: 1.79 m (5 ft 10 in)
- Position: Midfielder

Youth career
- Cremonese

Senior career*
Years	Team	Apps	(Gls)
2015–2016	Cremonese	0	(0)
2015–2016	→ Venezia (loan)	31	(0)
2016–2017	Venezia	5	(0)
2017–2022	Pro Patria	157	(3)
- * Club domestic league appearances and goals as of 16 July 2022

Leonardo Galli (born 3 July 1997) is an Italian professional footballer who plays as a midfielder.

== Club career ==
On 2 August 2017, Galli joined Serie D club Pro Patria. The midfielder was part of the team that won the 2017–18 Serie D. He renewed his contract in August 2019.

== Honours ==
Venezia

- Lega Pro: 2016–17
- Coppa Italia Lega Pro: 2016–17

Pro Patria

- Serie D: 2017–18
