= Juri Gonzi =

Russian footballer

Personal information
- Date of birth: 6 April 1994 (age 32)
- Place of birth: St. Petersburg, Russia
- Height: 1.79 m (5 ft 10 1/2 in)
- Positions: Midfielder; right-back

Team information
- Current team: Club Milano

Youth career
- 2011–2013: Siena

Senior career*
Years	Team	Apps	(Gls)
2013–2014	Cuneo	15	(1)
2014–2016	Mantova	47	(7)
2016–2020	AlbinoLeffe	123	(6)
2020–2023	Piacenza	93	(12)
2023–2024	Fiorenzuola	21	(3)
2024–2025	Tau Calcio Altopascio	10	(1)
2025–	Club Milano	10	(0)

International career
	Russia U17	3	(0)
- * Club domestic league appearances and goals as of 6 April 2025

Juri Gonzi (Russian: Юрий Гонци; born 6 April 1994) is a Russian footballer who plays as a midfielder for Serie D club Club Milano.

== Club career ==
Gonzi signed for AlbinoLeffe in August 2016. As of 2017, he was the only Russian footballer playing in Italy.

On 29 September 2020, he signed a two-year contract with Piacenza. He left Piacenza at the end of the 2021–22 season, and then returned to the club on 13 October 2022 until the end of the 2022–23 season.

On 15 July 2023, Gonzi joined Fiorenzuola on a one-year contract.

== Career statistics ==
=== Club ===
As of match played 3 October 2021

Club	Season	League			Cup		Continental		Other		Total	
Club	Season	Division	Apps	Goals	Apps	Goals	Apps	Goals	Apps	Goals	Apps	Goals
Cuneo	2013–14	Lega Pro 2	15	1	0	0	–		0	0	15	1
Mantova	2014–15	Lega Pro	21	3	1 (Note: Appearances in the Coppa Lega Pro)	0	–		0	0	22	3
Mantova	2015–16	Lega Pro	26	4	3	1	–		2 (Note: Appearances in the PlayOut Lega Pro)	0	31	5
Mantova	Total		47	7	4	1	0	0	2	0	53	8
AlbinoLeffe	2016–17	Lega Pro	35	5	2	0	–		3 (Note: Appearances in the Lega Pro Play-off)	0	40	5
AlbinoLeffe	2017–18	Serie C - B	31	0	4 (Note: Two appearances in the Coppa Italia, two appearances in the Coppa Italia Serie C)	0	–		2 (Note: Appearances in the Serie C Play-off)	0	37	0
AlbinoLeffe	2018–19	Serie C - B	31	1	3 (Note: Two appearances in the Coppa Italia Serie C, one appearance in the Coppa Italia)	0	–		–		34	1
AlbinoLeffe	2019–20	Serie C - A	20	0	1	0	–		1	0	22	0
AlbinoLeffe	Total		117	6	10	0	0	0	6	0	133	6
Piacenza	2020–21	Serie C - A	31	6	–		–		–		31	6
Piacenza	2021–22	Serie C - A	7	1	2	0	–		–		9	1
Piacenza	Total		38	7	2	0	0	0	0	0	40	7
Career total			217	21	16	1	0	0	8	0	241	22
