= Marco Beccaro =

Italian footballer

Personal information
- Date of birth: 25 November 1989 (age 36)
- Place of birth: Camposampiero, Italy
- Height: 1.83 m (6 ft 0 in)
- Position: Midfielder

Team information
- Current team: Treviso
- Number: 30

Youth career
- Padova

Senior career*
Years	Team	Apps	(Gls)
2008–2009	Albignasego	27	(4)
2009–2010	Domegliara	35	(13)
2010–2011	Mezzocorona	22	(0)
2011–2013	Real Vicenza	34+	(24)
2013–2014	Marano	22	(4)
2014–2015	Sacilese	27	(8)
2015–2016	Luparense	35	(19)
2016–2018	Mestre	66	(22)
2018–2020	Triestina	42	(3)
2020–2022	Südtirol	50	(9)
2022–2023	Luparense	28	(6)
2023–	Treviso	12	(0)
- * Club domestic league appearances and goals as of 20 December 2023

Marco Beccaro (born 25 November 1989) is an Italian professional footballer who plays as a midfielder for Serie D club Treviso.

== Club career ==
Beccaro started his senior career for Serie D club Albignasego.

In 2016, he joined Mestre and won the promotion to Serie C in the first season. Beccaro made his Serie C debut on 27 August 2017 against Teramo.

On 19 June 2018, he joined Triestina, playing two seasons on this club.

On 9 January 2020, he signed with Südtirol. On 5 July 2022, Beccaro's contract with Südtirol was terminated by mutual consent.

On 18 July 2022, Beccaro returned to Luparense in Serie D.
