= Angelo Talia =

Italian footballer (born 2003)

Personal information
- Date of birth: 10 March 2003 (age 23)
- Place of birth: Naples, Italy
- Height: 1.75 m (5 ft 9 in)
- Position: Midfielder

Team information
- Current team: Benevento
- Number: 38

Youth career
- Benevento

Senior career*
Years	Team	Apps	(Gls)
2021–	Benevento	34	(0)
2022–2023	→ Potenza (loan)	33	(1)
2023-	Benevento	83	(4)
- * Club domestic league appearances and goals as of 1 May 2026

Angelo Talia (born 10 March 2003) is an Italian professional footballer who plays as a midfielder for Serie B club Benevento.

== Club career ==
He was raised in the youth system of Benevento and joined their Under-19 squad for the 2020–21 season.

He made his debut for Benevento's senior squad on 14 August 2021 in a Coppa Italia victory over SPAL. He made his Serie B debut on 27 November 2021 against Reggina.

On 1 September 2022, Talia was loaned to Potenza in Serie C.
