= Campobasso FC =

Italian football club

Campobasso
- Full name: Campobasso Football Club
- Nicknames: Lupi (Wolves); Rossoblu (Red and Blues)
- Founded: 1919
- Ground: Stadio Antonio Molinari, Campobasso, Italy
- Capacity: 21,800
- Chairman: Matt Rizzetta
- Manager: Devis Mangia
- League: Serie C Group B
- 2025–26: Serie C Group B, 4th of 20
- Website: https://cb1919.com/
Home colours	Away colours

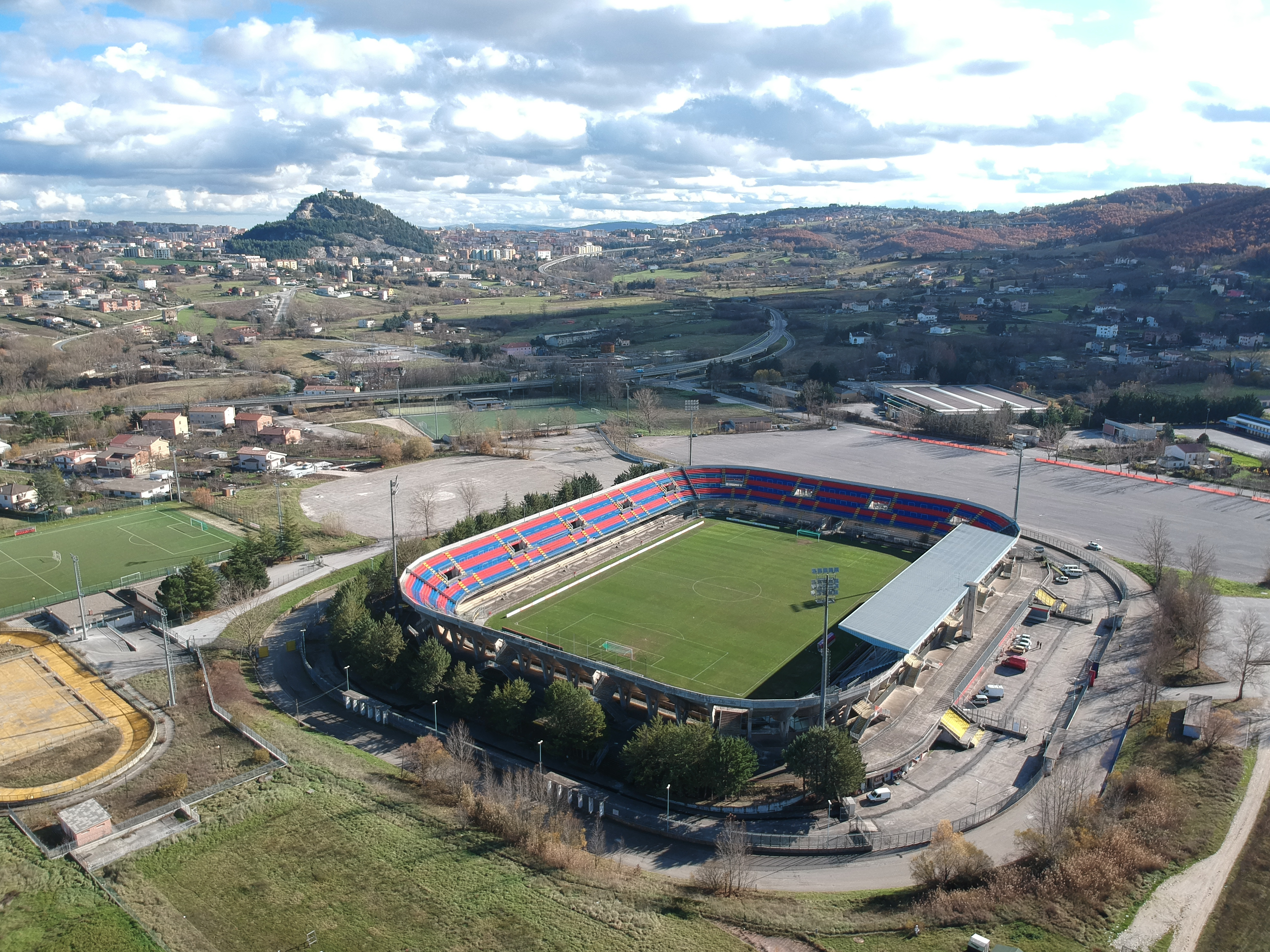
Stadio Nuovo Romagnoli, home venue of Campobasso FC

Campobasso Football Club, commonly referred to as Campobasso, is an Italian football club located in Campobasso, Molise, currently playing in Serie C, the third tier of Italian football.

The club traces its roots back to 1919 and plays its home games in the Stadio Antonio Molinari, the largest outdoor stadium in Molise and one of the largest in Southern Italy, with a capacity of 21,800.

In 2022, the club was acquired by a United States–based group controlled by business executive Matt Rizzetta and backed by Kelly Ripa, Mark Consuelos, Montreal-based real estate investor Angelo Pasto and other international investors.

Campobasso reached the height of its success in the 1980s when the club was promoted to Serie B and played five consecutive seasons in the second tier of Italian football.

The club's primary colours are red and blue, and the nickname is the Lupi (Wolves).

In July 2025, Campobasso FC was the focus of a docuseries "Running With the Wolves" in partnership with ESPN and Disney, which followed the club on their journey from the amateur ranks to consecutive promotions and becoming a club in the professional leagues of Italian football, and the social impact it has had on the often overlooked region of Molise.

== History ==
=== Early years ===
The club was founded in 1919 as Unione Sportiva Campobasso. Until 1929, the club played its games primarily against military opponents as well as regional teams such as Isernia, Benevento and Chieti.

Campobasso's first season in organized Italian football occurred in the 1929–30 season. The club's first promotion took place in the 1933–34 season when it won a spot in the Prima Divisione under the guidance of head coach Armand Halmos. The newly promoted Campobasso side changed its name to Littorio Campobasso beginning in the 1934–35 season. That season ended in disappointment, with the club being relegated to the Seconda Divisione.

The club was refounded under various names in subsequent seasons, including Fascio Giovanile Campobasso and Dopolavoro Ferraviario Campobasso ("Afterhours Train Workers of Campobasso"), and finished as high as fourth place in the 1938–39 season. During this period, the club began using red and blue jerseys, a tradition that has followed them ever since.

=== Post-war years ===
Following World War II, football in Campobasso resumed in 1948 under the name Unione Sportiva Campobasso. The newly-formed Campobasso club was placed in the Lega Interregionale Sud along with other southern Italian clubs that represented the capitals of their respective provinces.

Competing in the fourth tier in 1952, they played for some years at that level till being admitted to the newly established Serie D league in 1959.

Campobasso remained in Serie D for the following seasons, missing out on promotion in a few circumstances. However, in the 1969–70 season, with the club being admitted to a regional group featuring teams from Abruzzo, Marche and Apulia, Campobasso remained in the bottom of the league for most of the season and was eventually relegated.

=== 1970s: debut to Serie C ===
In 1972, Campobasso regained promotion to Serie D and started building up a team capable of finally achieving promotion to Serie C. After missing out on promotion to Benevento in the 1973–74 season, Campobasso were crowned league champions the year after, following a 5–0 win against Cerignola on 25 May 1975 in front of more than 10,000 fans, finally earning promotion to Serie C.

Competing in Serie C for the first time in its history, Campobasso set out with ambitions to comfortably avoid relegation in the 1975–76 season. The club overachieved compared to expectations, finishing impressively in sixth place.

The following seasons were characterized by a final matchday escape from relegation and then other more positive performances, including fourth places in the 1978–79 and 1979–80 seasons.

=== 1980s: Serie B ===
Following the momentum from previous seasons in Serie C, Campobasso's ambitions grew, and the fanbase and ownership were determined to reach Serie B for the first time in the club's history.

After narrowly missing out on promotion in the 1980–81 season, a new ownership led by construction tycoon Antonio Molinari and Antonio Pasinato as the new head coach led Campobasso to achieve promotion to Serie B for the first time in the club's history on 30 May 1982, after beating Reggina at home 1–0.

Campobasso's debut in Serie B saw the club finish 13th in the table, comfortably avoiding relegation and also achieving impressive results such as a win against a Fiorentina side that featured 1982 FIFA World Cup champions Giancarlo Antognoni and Francesco Graziani. Campobasso also achieved impressive results against larger teams such as AC Milan and Lazio.

The 1983–84 season saw Campobasso as promotion contenders. On the 11th matchday, they even topped the league table, but they eventually finished in seventh place.

The 1984–85 season saw Campobasso experience several changes, among them the departures of captain Michele Scorrano and head coach Antonio Pasinato; the team avoided relegation only on the final matchday of the season against Triestina but also had the chance to debut their brand-new stadium, Stadio Nuovo Romagnoli, which was inaugurated with the most prestigious victory in the history of the club to date: a 1–0 Coppa Italia win against Italian powerhouse Juventus, led by Giovanni Trapattoni, with an attendance of 40,000 fans, far surpassing the 26,000 capacity of the stadium.

For the 1986–87 season, Tord Grip was hired as the new manager but quickly proved to be unsuccessful in his role, being fired after just two wins in their first 19 games. A managerial change, with Giampiero Vitali now in charge, led to Campobasso winning a spot in a three-way relegation playout against Lazio and Taranto, which ultimately saw the Lupi being defeated, and relegated back to Serie C.

After gaining fourth place in the Italian third tier, Campobasso experienced two consecutive relegations, and the club was eventually declared bankrupt in 1990.

=== 1990s, 2000s and 2010s ===
After a refoundation and a number of relegations and promotions, in 2000, Campobasso were finally promoted back to Serie C2. However, after missing out on Serie C1 promotion in 2001, Campobasso were relegated once again one year later and declared insolvent immediately afterwards.

The club, now refounded as Nuovo Campobasso and restarting from Eccellenza, was promoted back to Serie D in 2005.

Following strong finishes in Serie D, due to bankruptcies by other clubs, Campobasso was admitted to Serie C2 in 2010 to fill a league vacancy. The following three seasons saw Campobasso finish mid-table in Serie C2 before the club was deemed ineligible to play by the Italian Federation.

The remainder of the 2010s saw Campobasso compete primarily in Serie D, where the club finished consistently safe of the relegation zone.

=== Foreign ownership ===
On 2 July 2019, Swiss-based Halley Holding purchased the club. In December 2020, New York–based North Sixth Group, led by Matt Rizzetta, acquired a minority ownership stake in Campobasso, buying 11 percent of the club with an option to increase its stake to 51 percent in the event of promotion to Serie C.

In their first season as co-owners, Gesue and Rizzetta proved to be a successful duo, with the club topping the table for nearly the entire season and eventually achieving promotion to Serie C and a spot in the third tier of Italian football for the first time in 32 years.

After a summer of ownership conflicts, Campobasso took the pitch for the first time in Serie C in 32 years. Beginning the year as a relegation candidate, Campobasso pulled together an impressive debut season in Serie C, finishing 13th place and comfortably avoiding relegation.

=== The American Era ===
The minority shareholder of the previous club, Italian-American Matt Rizzetta, president of North Sixth Group, on 12 September 2022—less than a week before the start of the Eccellenza championship—acquired US Campobasso 1919, the city's second team, from president Angelo Rispoli. The investment transformed Campobasso 1919 into the city's main club, which restarted from the fifth tier of Italian football.

Pino De Filippis was appointed sporting director (DS), Giuseppe Di Meo as head coach, and 12 new players were signed, many with previous experience in Serie C and Serie D. In November 2022, celebrity couple Kelly Ripa and Mark Consuelos became minority owners of the club through an investment in North Sixth Group, joining Italian-Canadian Angelo Pastò (originally from Ururi), who had previously joined the ownership group.

Campobasso finished the first half of the season winning 14 out of 15 matches and won the Molise regional final of the Coppa Italia Dilettanti on February 5, 2023, beating Aurora Alto Casertano 1–0 at the Marchese del Prete Stadium in Venafro. In the second half of the season, the team maintained its lead in the standings, and on May 7, at a neutral venue in Bojano, Campobasso defeated Turris 4–0, securing promotion to Serie D with 84 points (28 wins out of 30 matches), finishing 2 points ahead of Isernia. They also ended the season with the league's best attack (137 goals scored) and second-best defense (10 goals conceded) across all of Eccellenza 2022–2023. In the Coppa Italia Dilettanti, the team reached the semifinals, where they lost to San Marzano.

On May 16, 2023, the club officially changed its name to Campobasso Football Club and unveiled a new, more modern and international logo.

Ahead of the return to Serie D, the club assembled a strong squad with the clear goal of immediately earning promotion to Serie C. The 2023–2024 season began with a 2–1 win over Termoli in the Coppa Italia Serie D preliminary round on August 27, 2023—the first official match of the season. A week later, the team defeated Vastogirardi 3–0 away in the first round. The league opener was played on September 10, 2023: in front of over 2,000 fans at the Nuovo Romagnoli stadium (renamed "Avicor Stadium Selvapiana" for sponsorship reasons), Campobasso beat Monterotondo from Lazio 3–1. However, the team earned only 7 points in the first five matches. As a result, on October 11, the club dismissed head coach Andrea Mosconi and sporting director Pino De Filippis. Rosario Pergolizzi was appointed as the new coach and Sergio Filipponi as the new sporting director.

With a new technical staff and several squad changes in December, Campobasso regained lost ground, defeated league leaders and previously unbeaten Sambenedettese on matchday 14, and finished the first half of the season in first place in a tightly contested league, with L'Aquila, Chieti, and Avezzano also competing for the top spot. In the Coppa Italia, the team progressed to the round of 16 before being eliminated by Imolese. Campobasso eventually secured first place in Group F, earning a second consecutive direct promotion and returning to professional football after two years.

On May 17, 2024, despite winning the league and still being involved in the Serie D championship playoff tournament ("Poule Scudetto"), head coach Pergolizzi parted ways with the club. The team was temporarily entrusted to assistant coach Giovanni Piccirilli, who led the Molise side to the national Serie D title. In the final, played in Grosseto, Campobasso defeated Trapani with a resounding 5–1 victory, earning the right to wear the tricolour badge the following season.

Back in the third tier (Serie C), Campobasso assembled its squad under the guidance of head coach Piero Braglia and sporting director Filipponi, with the declared goal of reaching the playoffs. After a shaky start, including elimination from the Coppa Italia Serie C by Giugliano on August 10 and a defeat away to Arezzo in the first league match on August 25, the team climbed up the table and entered the playoff zone. However, from the end of the first half of the season, results took a downturn, dragging the team toward the bottom of the standings. Braglia was dismissed and replaced by Fabio Prosperi, who—despite inconsistent results—managed to lead Campobasso to safety.

Campobasso FC developed a cult following as an underdog club that against all odds rose from the ranks of economic and social obscurity to win two consecutive championships for the first time in its 105-year history.

In July 2025, the story of Campobasso FC was the focus of a docuseries "Running With the Wolves" in partnership with ESPN and Disney, which followed the club on their journey from the amateur ranks to the professional leagues of Italian football and the social impact it has had on the often overlooked region of Molise.

== Colours and symbols ==
=== Colours ===
Campobasso's official team colors are red and blue. Home kits are red and blue striped jerseys with blue shorts and red socks. Away kits are white and blue jerseys with blue shorts and blue socks.

=== Symbols ===
The official symbol of Campobasso is the Wolf. Often, the club has integrated the symbol of castles into its shield as a testament to the City, which is known for the six towers that encompass it.

== Organizational Chart ==
- Matt Rizzetta, through North Sixth Group – Majority Owner – President
- Nicola Cirrincione, through North Sixth Group – Vice President
- Angelo Pastò, through Stanford Properties Group – Minority Owner
- Mark Consuelos, through North Sixth Group – Minority Owner
- Kelly Ripa, through North Sixth Group – Minority Owner
- Ellner Gardner, through North Sixth Group – Minority Owner
- Aldo Vicenzo, through North Sixth Group – Minority Owner
- Patrick Chovan – Minority Owner
- Mario Colalillo – General Manager
- Giacomo Reale – Team Manager
- Giuseppe Figliomeni – Sporting Director
- Luciano Zauri – Head Coach
- Stefano Lucchini – Assistant Coach
- Daniele Lanza – Goalkeeper Coach
- Giuseppe Di Santo – Technical Assistant and Match Analyst
- Emerico Pellegrini – Fitness Coach
- Gabriele Salemme – Team Doctor
- Giuseppe Santella – Physiotherapist and Masseur
- Pasquale Tartaglia – Physiotherapist and Masseur
- Cristina Niro – Head of Communications, Press Officer
- Andrea Zita – Marketing Manager
- Nicola Masciotra – Commercial Manager
- Marco Moffa – Official Graphic Designer and Photographer
- Dario Antoniani – Videomaker
- Francesco Furno – Stadium Manager
- Goffredo Iorio – Groundskeeper
- Jacopo Stivaletti, Antonio Poce – Equipment Managers

== Culture ==
Campobasso has been mentioned in various Italian films and built a cult following as a favorite underdog tale. The club was cited in the popular Italian film Il Tifoso, L'Arbitro e il Calciatore (The Fan, The Referee and the Player).

In July 2025, the television series Running With the Wolves is scheduled for release, in collaboration with Disney and ESPN. The series tells the story of Campobasso's revival, from competing in the Eccellenza league to their return to Serie C in 2024.

== Current squad ==
As of 24 September 2026

Note: Flags indicate national team as defined under FIFA eligibility rules; some limited exceptions apply. Players may hold more than one non-FIFA nationality.

No.	Pos.	Nation	Player
1	GK	ITA	Andrea Spurio
2	DF	ITA	Federico Papini
4	DF	ITA	Christian Celesia
5	MF	ITA	Mario Gargiulo
7	FW	BRA	Isaac
8	MF	ITA	Rocco Di Vico (on loan from Salernitana)
10	FW	ITA	Matteo Stoppa
11	DF	ITA	Lorenzo Carfora (on loan from Benevento)
14	FW	ITA	Alfredo Bifulco
18	DF	ITA	Roberto Pierno
19	MF	ITA	Leonardo Blasi
21	MF	ITA	Riccardo Fogliata (on loan from Union Brescia)
22	GK	LAT	Roberts Apsīts (on loan from Inter Milan)
23	MF	ITA	Alessandro Pellitteri

No.	Pos.	Nation	Player
25	GK	ESP	Antonio Martínez
27	DF	ITA	Claudio Cristallo
28	MF	ITA	Francesco Maisto
30	DF	ITA	Lorenzo Coccia
31	DF	ITA	Emmanuele Salines
33	DF	ITA	Mattia Capoferri
34	MF	ITA	Davide Agazzi
36	MF	ITA	Antonello Serra
70	FW	ITA	Simone Leonardi (on loan from Catania)
75	DF	ITA	Francesco Parisi
77	DF	ITA	Cristian Aragona
92	FW	ITA	Alessandro Galeandro
95	DF	ITA	Gabriele Corbo
99	GK	ITA	Christian Muzi

=== Out on loan ===
Note: Flags indicate national team as defined under FIFA eligibility rules; some limited exceptions apply. Players may hold more than one non-FIFA nationality.

No.	Pos.	Nation	Player
—	DF	ITA	Matteo Lanza (at Athletic Club Palermo until 30 June 2027)
—	MF	ITA	Francesco Chirico (at Licata until 30 June 2027)

No.	Pos.	Nation	Player
—	FW	ITA	Giuseppe La Monica (at Bisceglie until 30 June 2027)
—	FW	ITA	Andrea Lombari (at Virtus Francavilla until 30 June 2027)

== Honours ==
- Scudetto Serie D
  - Champions: 2023–24
- Coppa Italia Dilettanti:
  - Champions: 2013–14
- Serie D
  - Champions: 1974–1975 (Group H), 1999–2000 (Group H), 2020–2021 (Group F), 2023–2024 (Group F)
- Coppa Italia Dilettanti (Fase C.N.D.)
  - Champions: 1997–1998
- Coppa Italia Molise
  - Champions: 1996-1997, 2004-2005, 2013–2014, 2022–2023
- Eccellenza Molise
  - Champions: 1992-1993, 1996-1997, 2004–2005, 2013-2014, 2022–2023
- Promozione Molise
  - Champions: 1991-1992
- Prima Categoria Molise
  - Champions: 1990-1991
- Seconda Divisione
  - Champions: 1933-1934
