= Benevento Calcio =

Italian professional football team

Benevento
- Full name: Benevento Calcio S.r.l.
- Nicknames: Gli Stregoni (The Sorcerers); I Giallorossi (The Yellow and Reds); I Sanniti (The Samnites)
- Founded: 1929; 97 years ago 1938 (refounded); 2005; 21 years ago as Benevento Calcio
- Stadium: Stadio Ciro Vigorito
- Capacity: 16,867
- Owner: IVPC Group
- President: Oreste Vigorito
- Head coach: Antonio Floro Flores
- League: Serie B
- 2025–26: Serie C Group C, 1st of 20 (promoted)
- Website: www.beneventocalcio.club
Home colours	Away colours	Third colours

Benevento Calcio, commonly referred to as Benevento, is an Italian professional football club based in Benevento, Campania. The club was originally founded in 1929 and then re-founded in 2005. They currently compete in Serie B, the second division of the Italian football league.

== History ==
=== Early history ===
The club was founded as Associazione Calcio Benevento in 1929, their original home was the Meomartini which was built by Ciccio Minocchia.

After working their way up the country's lower divisions during their early years, Benevento reached Prima Divisione, Italy's third highest professional league at the time, in the 1934–35 season. They finished above clubs such as Reggina during the club's first season within the league. Although they did not win promotion to Serie B, the team did remain in the third tier of Italian football for the 1935–36 season, re-organized to a smaller 64-team league renamed Serie C.

=== 21st century ===
The club F.C. Sporting Benevento S.r.l. folded in 2005. At the same time Benevento Calcio S.p.A. was founded, using the same stadium and playing kit.

In the 2007–08 Serie C2 regular season the team finished first in Girone C, winning direct promotion to the now called Lega Pro Prima Divisione for the 2008–09 season. In the 2008–09 season, Benevento's first season in Lega Pro Prima Divisione, they finished in 2nd place. This meant Benevento would be in a two-legged play-off. They won their first two-legged play-off, but lost to Crotone 1–0 (2–1) on aggregate in the final.

Gaetano Auteri was appointed as the head manager for the 2015–16 season. In this season, Benevento won its league and reached Serie B for the first time in its history. The mathematical certainty arrived on 30 April 2016, after defeating Lecce 3–0.

On 8 June 2017, they were promoted to Serie A, for the first time in their history, after defeating Carpi in the Serie B play-offs 1–0 on aggregate, remarkably winning promotion in their inaugural season in Serie B. The club struggled in its top-flight debut in the 2017-18 season as Benevento set a record for the worst start to a season in any of Europe's top five leagues by losing their first 14 Serie A matches. This streak ended on 3 December 2017, with a 95th-minute equalising header from goalkeeper Alberto Brignoli for a 2–2 home draw against A.C. Milan. Benevento's time in Serie A lasted one season and they were relegated after a last-place finish, although there was a clear uptick in form after their dismal opening to the campaign, ultimately winning six of their last 23 games.

On 22 June 2019, Benevento hired Filippo Inzaghi as their new manager. In June 2020, with seven matches still left in the league season, the club won promotion back to the first-division of Italian football following an impressive Serie B campaign.

Benevento's second season in Serie A was unsuccessful, ending with another relegation, but the club was much more competitive, especially in the first half of the season. By the campaign's midway point, Benevento was 10th in Serie A, having won six matches and experienced a run of only one loss in eight matches, appearing well-set for a mid-table finish. However, a dramatic downturn in form from January until the end of the campaign, scoring only 16 goals and winning just one of the final 22 matches in that time, meant that the club again fell back into Serie B for the 2021–22 season. The match they won was a 1–0 away victory on 21 March against Juventus, with the reverse fixture finishing in a draw. Benevento eventually finished in 18th place, with four points fewer than Torino in the final non-relegation position.

In the following season's Serie B, the team finished the regular season in 7th place, gaining access to the promotion play-offs by overcoming Ascoli. They were later eliminated by Pisa in the semifinals.

The team declined during the 2022–23 campaign. The team spent most of the season at the bottom of the table, and on the penultimate matchday, relegation to Serie C was confirmed and the team ultimately finished last in the Serie B table.

Benevento won its league and promotion for the 2025–26 season, after a three season absence from the Serie B.

== Colours and badge ==
The team's colours are yellow and red, and their badge features red and yellow stripes and the black image of a witch riding a broom. Benevento are nicknamed the Stregoni, Italian for sorcerers, or, occasionally, the Streghe, Italian for witches, a reference to the legends dating to the 13th century of the witches of Benevento.

== Stadium ==
Benevento plays their home matches at the Stadio Ciro Vigorito. Building on the stadium broke ground in 1976 and it was opened in 1979. It is able to hold 25,000 people.

The stadium was originally named Santa Colomba but was renamed to honor Ciro Vigorito who was the brother of club president Oreste Vigorito. Ciro was a successful entrepreneur and sports manager who was the managing director and oversaw the youth sector at Benevento from 2006 until his death in 2010.

== Players ==
=== Current squad ===
As of 10 September 2026

Note: Flags indicate national team as defined under FIFA eligibility rules; some limited exceptions apply. Players may hold more than one non-FIFA nationality.

No.	Pos.	Nation	Player
4	MF	ITA	Antonio Prisco
5	DF	ITA	Luca Caldirola
6	MF	GRE	Antonis Siatounis
8	MF	ITA	Mattia Maita
9	FW	ITA	Francesco Salvemini
10	FW	ITA	Luigi Cherubini (on loan from Roma)
11	MF	ITA	Davide Lamesta
13	DF	ITA	Raffaele Celia
14	DF	ITA	Stefano Scognamillo
15	DF	ITA	Christian Dalle Mura
16	MF	ITA	Mattia Mannini (on loan from Roma)
17	DF	ITA	Leonardo Sernicola
18	MF	ITA	Pier Luigi Simonetti
19	FW	ITA	Vincenzo Battista
20	DF	ITA	Pietro Beruatto
21	FW	ITA	Emanuele Schimmenti

No.	Pos.	Nation	Player
22	GK	ITA	Manuel Esposito
23	DF	ITA	Pietro Saio
25	DF	ITA	Raffaele Romano
26	GK	ITA	Gianmarco Vannucchi
28	MF	CIV	Christian Kouan
29	FW	NGR	David Okereke
30	FW	BRA	Logan
31	DF	ITA	Giacomo Ricci
32	FW	ITA	Guglielmo Mignani
38	MF	ITA	Angelo Talia
77	DF	ITA	Edoardo Pierozzi
80	MF	ITA	Matteo Donatiello
82	MF	ITA	Matteo Del Gaudio
90	FW	ITA	Simone Verdi
93	FW	ITA	Marco Tumminello
96	GK	SEN	Alioune Sylla

=== Out on loan ===
Note: Flags indicate national team as defined under FIFA eligibility rules; some limited exceptions apply. Players may hold more than one non-FIFA nationality.

No.	Pos.	Nation	Player
—	DF	ITA	Giovanni Castaldi (at Sorrento until 30 June 2027)
—	DF	ITA	Angelo Viscardi (at Sorrento until 30 June 2027)
—	MF	ITA	Dino Mehić (at Casertana until 30 June 2027)

No.	Pos.	Nation	Player
—	FW	ITA	Lorenzo Carfora (at Campobasso until 30 June 2027)
—	FW	ITA	Mario Perlingieri (at Audace Cerignola until 30 June 2027)

== Coaching staff ==
Position	Name
Head coach	(Italy) Antonio Floro Flores
Assistant coach	(Italy) Lorenzo Cassia
Goalkeeper coach	(Italy) Antonio Chiavelli
Fitness coach	(Italy) Andrea Molteni
Scouting First Team	(Italy) Andrea Innocenti
Physiotherapist	(Italy) Ernesto Galliano
Physiotherapist	(Italy) Luca Lepore
Physiotherapist	(Italy) Giorgio Policastri
Physiotherapist	(Italy) Raffaele Marinaccio
Chief Doctor	(Italy) Walter Giorgione
Club Doctor	(Italy) Franco De Cicco
Club Doctor	(Italy) Raffaele Fuiano
Club Doctor	(Italy) Mario De Vita
Club Doctor	(Italy) Luca Milano

== Notable former players ==
=== World Cup players ===
The following players have been selected by their country in the World Cup Finals, while playing for Benevento.

- (Togo) Massamasso Tchangai (2006)
- (Poland) Kamil Glik (2022)

== Notable former managers ==
- (Italy) Giuseppe Zilizzi (1935–36)
- (Italy) Giuseppe Viani (1945–46)
- (Argentina) Francisco Lojacono (1974–75)
- (Italy) Gastone Bean (1981–83)
- (Italy) Giuseppe Materazzi (1984–85)
- (Italy) Adriano Lombardi (1995–96)
- (Italy) Massimo Silva (1996–98)
- (Italy) Nello Di Costanzo (2002–04)
- (Italy) Giovanni Simonelli (2006–08)
- (Italy) Antonio Soda (2008–09)
- (Italy) Leonardo Acori (2009)
- (Italy) Andrea Camplone (2009–10)
- (Italy) Leonardo Acori (2010)
- (Italy) Giuseppe Galderisi (2010–11)
- (Italy) Giovanni Simonelli (2011)
- (Italy) Carmelo Imbriani (2011–12)
- (Italy) Guido Ugolotti (2012–13)
- (Italy) Guido Carboni (2013–14)
- (Italy) Gaetano Auteri (2015–16)
- (Italy) Marco Baroni (2016–17)
- (Italy) Roberto De Zerbi (2017–2018)
- (Italy) Cristian Bucchi (2018–2019)
- (Italy) Filippo Inzaghi (2019–2021)
- (Italy) Fabio Caserta (2021–2022)
- (Italy) Fabio Cannavaro (2022–2023)
- (Italy) Roberto Stellone (2023)

== Honours ==
- Serie B
  - Winners: 2019–20
  - Play-off winner: 2016–17
- Serie C
  - Winners: 2015–16, 2025–26
- Serie C2
  - Winners: 2007–08 (Group C)
