= 2011–12 Serie A =

110th season of top-tier Italian football

Serie A
- Season: 2011–12
- Dates: 9 September 2011 – 13 May 2012
- Champions: Juventus; 28th title
- Relegated: Lecce (to C1); Novara; Cesena
- Champions League: Juventus; Milan; Udinese
- Europa League: Lazio; Napoli; Internazionale
- Matches: 380
- Goals: 972 (2.56 per match)
- Top goalscorer: Zlatan Ibrahimović (28 goals)
- Biggest home win: Napoli 6–1 Genoa (21 December 2011); Internazionale 5–0 Parma (7 January 2012)
- Biggest away win: Fiorentina 0–5 Juventus (17 March 2012)
- Highest scoring: Napoli 6–3 Cagliari (9 March 2012); Internazionale 5–4 Genoa (1 April 2012)
- Longest winning run: 8 games Juventus
- Longest unbeaten run: 38 games Juventus
- Longest winless run: 20 games Cesena
- Longest losing run: 5 games Cesena
- Highest attendance: 79,522; Milan 0–1 Internazionale
- Lowest attendance: 5,962; Lecce 0–0 Bologna
- Average attendance: 23,214

The 2011–12 Serie A (known as the Serie A TIM after its headline sponsors) was the 110th season of top-tier Italian football, the 80th in a round-robin tournament, and the second since its organization under a league committee separate from Serie B. It began on 3 September 2011 and ended on 13 May 2012. The league was originally scheduled to start on 27 August, but this was delayed due to a strike by the players. The fixtures were drawn up on 27 July 2011.

The league title was won by Juventus, winning its 28th official Serie A title or scudetto, and first since the 2005–06 Serie A. The team completed the season undefeated, becoming the first team to do so in a 38-game league season in Italy; Perugia were undefeated in the 30-game 1978–79 Serie A, in which they finished second in the table, while Milan were unbeaten and won the title in the 34-game 1991–92 Serie A.

Since Italy dropped from third to fourth place in the UEFA association coefficient rankings at the end of the 2010–11 season, the league lost a group stage berth for the UEFA Champions League from the 2012–13 season.

== Rule changes ==
The rules for the registration of non-EU (or non-EFTA or Swiss) nationals transferred from abroad were revised in the summer of 2011. Clubs could now sign two non-EU players. This was a reverse of the decision made the previous summer in the wake of Italy's failure at the 2010 World Cup that limited clubs to the signing of just one such player.

== Teams ==
=== Stadia and locations ===
Locations of the 2011–12 Serie A teams

Team	Home city	Stadium	Capacity	2010-11 season
Atalanta	Bergamo	Atleti Azzurri d'Italia	24,642	Serie B champions
Bologna	Bologna	Renato Dall'Ara	39,444	16th in Serie A
Cagliari	Cagliari	Sant'Elia	23,486	14th in Serie A
Catania	Catania	Angelo Massimino	23,420	13th in Serie A
Cesena	Cesena	Dino Manuzzi	23,860	15th in Serie A
Chievo Verona	Verona	Marc'Antonio Bentegodi	39,211	11th in Serie A
Fiorentina	Florence	Artemio Franchi	47,282	9th in Serie A
Genoa	Genoa	Luigi Ferraris	36,685	10th in Serie A
Internazionale	Milan	San Siro	80,074	Serie A Runner-up
Juventus	Turin	Juventus Stadium	41,254	7th in Serie A
Lazio	Rome	Olimpico	72,698	5th in Serie A
Lecce	Lecce	Via del Mare	33,876	17th in Serie A
Milan	Milan	San Siro	80,074	Serie A champions
Napoli	Naples	San Paolo	60,240	3rd in Serie A
Novara	Novara	Silvio Piola	17,875	Serie B play-off winners
Palermo	Palermo	Renzo Barbera	37,242	8th in Serie A
Parma	Parma	Ennio Tardini	27,906	12th in Serie A
Roma	Rome	Olimpico	72,698	6th in Serie A
Siena	Siena	Artemio Franchi	15,373	Serie B Runner-up
Udinese	Udine	Friuli	41,652	4th in Serie A

=== Personnel and sponsorship ===
Team	Manager	Captain	Kit manufacturer	Shirt sponsor
Atalanta	(Italy) Stefano Colantuono	(Italy) Gianpaolo Bellini	Erreà	AXA, Konica Minolta
Bologna	(Italy) Stefano Pioli	(Italy) Marco Di Vaio	Macron	NGM Mobile, Serenissima Ceramica (Home)/CIR Manifatture Ceramiche (Away)
Cagliari	(Italy) Massimo Ficcadenti	(Italy) Daniele Conti	Kappa	Sardegna
Catania	(Italy) Vincenzo Montella	(Italy) Marco Biagianti	Givova	SP Energia Siciliana, Regione Sicilia
Cesena	(Italy) Mario Beretta	(Italy) Giuseppe Colucci	Adidas	Technogym
Chievo Verona	(Italy) Domenico Di Carlo	(Italy) Sergio Pellissier	Givova	Paluani/Banca Popolare di Verona/Merkur-Win, Midac Batteries
Fiorentina	(Italy) Vincenzo Guerini	(Italy) Alessandro Gamberini	Lotto	Mazda, Save the Children
Genoa	(Italy) Luigi De Canio	(Italy) Marco Rossi	Asics	iZiPlay
Internazionale	(Italy) Andrea Stramaccioni	(Argentina) Javier Zanetti	Nike	Pirelli
Juventus	(Italy) Antonio Conte	(Italy) Alessandro Del Piero	Nike	Betclic (Home)/Balocco (Away)
Lazio	(Italy) Edoardo Reja	(Italy) Tommaso Rocchi	Puma	Clinica Paideia/Fondazione Gabriele Sandri
Lecce	(Italy) Serse Cosmi	(Uruguay) Guillermo Giacomazzi	Asics	Veneto Banca/Banca Apulia, Betitaly
Milan	(Italy) Massimiliano Allegri	(Italy) Massimo Ambrosini	Adidas	Fly Emirates
Napoli	(Italy) Walter Mazzarri	(Italy) Paolo Cannavaro	Macron	Lete, MSC Cruises
Novara	(Italy) Emiliano Mondonico	(Italy) Matteo Centurioni	Joma	Banca Popolare di Novara, Intesa pour Homme
Palermo	(Italy) Bortolo Mutti	(Italy) Fabrizio Miccoli	Legea	Eurobet Casinò, Burger King
Parma	(Italy) Roberto Donadoni	(Italy) Stefano Morrone	Erreà	Navigare, Banca Monte Parma
Roma	(Spain) Luis Enrique	(Italy) Francesco Totti	Kappa	Wind
Siena	(Italy) Giuseppe Sannino	(Italy) Simone Vergassola	Kappa	Banca Monte dei Paschi di Siena
Udinese	(Italy) Francesco Guidolin	(Italy) Antonio Di Natale	Legea	Dacia, Tipicamente Friulano/Lumberjack/QBell

=== Managerial changes ===
In Italy, football managers are only permitted to manage one club per season. For this purpose, the "season" is defined as starting when its first match kicks off, so Roberto Donadoni and Stefano Pioli, who lost their job at Cagliari and Palermo on 12 and 31 August 2011 were able to take respectively the Parma job in January 2012 and the Bologna job in October 2011 because the first matches were not until 9 September 2011.

Team	Outgoing manager	Manner of departure	Date of vacancy	Position in table	Replaced by	Date of appointment
Lecce	(Italy) Luigi De Canio	End of contract	19 May 2011	Preseason	(Italy) Eusebio Di Francesco	27 June 2011
Cesena	(Italy) Massimo Ficcadenti	End of contract	20 May 2011	Preseason	(Italy) Marco Giampaolo	4 June 2011
Bologna	(Italy) Alberto Malesani	End of contract	26 May 2011	Preseason	(Italy) Pierpaolo Bisoli	26 May 2011
Chievo	(Italy) Stefano Pioli	End of contract	26 May 2011	Preseason	(Italy) Domenico Di Carlo	9 June 2011
Juventus	(Italy) Luigi Delneri	Sacked	31 May 2011	Preseason	(Italy) Antonio Conte	31 May 2011
Siena	(Italy) Antonio Conte	Mutual consent	31 May 2011	Preseason	(Italy) Giuseppe Sannino	6 June 2011
Palermo	(Italy) Delio Rossi	Mutual consent	1 June 2011	Preseason	(Italy) Stefano Pioli	2 June 2011
Catania	(Argentina) Diego Simeone	Mutual consent	1 June 2011	Preseason	(Italy) Vincenzo Montella	9 June 2011
Genoa	(Italy) Davide Ballardini	Sacked	4 June 2011	Preseason	(Italy) Alberto Malesani	19 June 2011
Roma	(Italy) Vincenzo Montella	End of caretaker spell	9 June 2011	Preseason	(Spain) Luis Enrique	10 June 2011
Internazionale	(Brazil) Leonardo	Resigned	15 June 2011	Preseason	(Italy) Gian Piero Gasperini	24 June 2011
Cagliari	(Italy) Roberto Donadoni	Sacked	12 August 2011	Preseason	(Italy) Massimo Ficcadenti	16 August 2011
Palermo	(Italy) Stefano Pioli	Sacked	31 August 2011	Preseason	(Italy) Devis Mangia	31 August 2011
Internazionale	(Italy) Gian Piero Gasperini	Sacked	21 September 2011	18th	(Italy) Claudio Ranieri	21 September 2011
Bologna	(Italy) Pierpaolo Bisoli	Sacked	4 October 2011	20th	(Italy) Stefano Pioli	4 October 2011
Cesena	(Italy) Marco Giampaolo	Sacked	30 October 2011	20th	(Italy) Daniele Arrigoni	1 November 2011
Fiorentina	(Serbia) Siniša Mihajlović	Sacked	7 November 2011	13th	(Italy) Delio Rossi	7 November 2011
Cagliari	(Italy) Massimo Ficcadenti	Sacked	8 November 2011	10th	(Italy) Davide Ballardini	9 November 2011
Lecce	(Italy) Eusebio Di Francesco	Sacked	4 December 2011	20th	(Italy) Serse Cosmi	4 December 2011
Palermo	(Italy) Devis Mangia	Sacked	19 December 2011	10th	(Italy) Bortolo Mutti	19 December 2011
Genoa	(Italy) Alberto Malesani	Sacked	22 December 2011	10th	(Italy) Pasquale Marino	22 December 2011
Parma	(Italy) Franco Colomba	Sacked	9 January 2012	15th	(Italy) Roberto Donadoni	9 January 2012
Novara	(Italy) Attilio Tesser	Sacked	30 January 2012	20th	(Italy) Emiliano Mondonico	30 January 2012
Cesena	(Italy) Daniele Arrigoni	Mutual consent	20 February 2012	20th	(Italy) Mario Beretta	21 February 2012
Novara	(Italy) Emiliano Mondonico	Sacked	6 March 2012	19th	(Italy) Attilio Tesser	6 March 2012
Cagliari	(Italy) Davide Ballardini	Sacked for just cause	11 March 2012	17th	(Italy) Massimo Ficcadenti	11 March 2012
Internazionale	(Italy) Claudio Ranieri	Consensual termination	26 March 2012	8th	(Italy) Andrea Stramaccioni	26 March 2012
Genoa	(Italy) Pasquale Marino	Sacked	2 April 2012	16th	(Italy) Alberto Malesani	2 April 2012
Genoa	(Italy) Alberto Malesani	Sacked	22 April 2012	17th	(Italy) Luigi De Canio	22 April 2012
Fiorentina	(Italy) Delio Rossi	Sacked	2 May 2012	16th	(Italy) Vincenzo Guerini (caretaker)	3 May 2012

== League table ==
Pos	Team	Pld	W	D	L	GF	GA	GD	Pts	Qualification or relegation
1	Juventus (C)	38	23	15	0	68	20	+48	84	Qualification to Champions League group stage
2	Milan	38	24	8	6	74	33	+41	80	Qualification to Champions League group stage
3	Udinese	38	18	10	10	52	35	+17	64	Qualification to Champions League play-off round
4	Lazio	38	18	8	12	56	47	+9	62	Qualification to Europa League play-off round
5	Napoli	38	16	13	9	66	46	+20	61	Qualification to Europa League group stage (Note: Napoli qualified to the group stage of the Europa League as winner of the 2011–12 Coppa Italia. As they finished fifth, the sixth-placed team of the league also qualified for the Europa League.)
6	Internazionale	38	17	7	14	58	55	+3	58	Qualification to Europa League third qualifying round
7	Roma	38	16	8	14	60	54	+6	56 (Note: Roma finished ahead of Parma on head–to–head away goals scored: Parma 0–1 Roma, Roma 1–0 Parma.)	
8	Parma	38	15	11	12	54	53	+1	56	
9	Bologna	38	13	12	13	41	43	−2	51	
10	Chievo	38	12	13	13	35	45	−10	49	
11	Catania	38	11	15	12	47	52	−5	48	
12	Atalanta (Note: Atalanta were deducted 6 points due to involvement in the 2011–12 Italian football scandal.)	38	13	13	12	41	43	−2	46 (Note: Atalanta finished ahead of Fiorentina on head–to–head away goals scored: Atalanta 2–0 Fiorentina, Fiorentina 2–2 Atalanta.)	
13	Fiorentina	38	11	13	14	37	43	−6	46	
14	Siena	38	11	11	16	45	45	0	44	
15	Cagliari	38	10	13	15	37	46	−9	43 (Note: Cagliari finished ahead of Palermo on goal difference : Cagliari 2–1 Palermo, Palermo 3–2 Cagliari; Cagliari = –9, Palermo = –10.)	
16	Palermo	38	11	10	17	52	62	−10	43	
17	Genoa	38	11	9	18	50	69	−19	42	
18	Lecce (R, D, R)	38	8	12	18	40	56	−16	36	Relegation to Serie C1 (Note: Lecce were originally relegated to Serie B, but further relegated to Lega Pro Prima Divisione due to involvement in the 2011–12 Italian football scandal.)
19	Novara (R)	38	7	11	20	35	65	−30	32	Relegation to Serie B
20	Cesena (R)	38	4	10	24	24	60	−36	22	Relegation to Serie B

Source: Lega Serie A
Rules for classification: 1) points; 2) head-to-head points; 3) head-to-head goal difference; 4) head-to-head goals scored; 5) goal difference; 6) number of goals scored
(C) Champions; (D) Disqualified; (R) Relegated

== Results ==
Home \ Away	ATA	BOL	CAG	CTN	CES	CHV	FIO	GEN	INT	JUV	LAZ	LCE	MIL	NAP	NOV	PAL	PAR	ROM	SIE	UDI
Atalanta		2–0	1–0	1–1	4–1	1–0	2–0	1–0	1–1	0–2	0–2	0–0	0–2	1–1	2–1	1–0	1–1	4–1	1–2	0–0
Bologna	3–1		1–0	2–0	0–1	2–2	2–0	3–2	1–3	1–1	0–2	0–2	2–2	2–0	1–0	1–3	0–0	0–2	1–0	1–3
Cagliari	2–0	1–1		3–0	3–0	0–0	0–0	3–0	2–2	0–2	0–3	1–2	0–2	0–0	2–1	2–1	0–0	4–2	0–0	0–0
Catania	2–0	0–1	0–1		1–0	1–2	1–0	4–0	2–1	1–1	1–0	1–2	1–1	2–1	3–1	2–0	1–1	1–1	0–0	0–2
Cesena	0–1	0–0	1–1	0–0		0–0	0–0	2–0	0–1	0–1	1–2	0–1	1–3	1–3	3–1	2–2	2–2	2–3	0–2	0–1
Chievo	0–0	0–1	2–0	3–2	1–0		1–0	2–1	0–2	0–0	0–3	1–0	0–1	1–0	2–2	1–0	1–2	0–0	1–1	0–0
Fiorentina	2–2	2–0	0–0	2–2	2–0	1–2		1–0	0–0	0–5	1–2	0–1	0–0	0–3	2–2	0–0	3–0	3–0	2–1	3–2
Genoa	2–2	2–1	2–1	3–0	1–1	0–1	2–2		0–1	0–0	3–2	0–0	0–2	3–2	1–0	2–0	2–2	2–1	1–4	3–2
Internazionale	0–0	0–3	2–1	2–2	2–1	1–0	2–0	5–4		1–2	2–1	4–1	4–2	0–3	0–1	4–4	5–0	0–0	2–1	0–1
Juventus	3–1	1–1	1–1	3–1	2–0	1–1	2–1	2–2	2–0		2–1	1–1	2–0	3–0	2–0	3–0	4–1	4–0	0–0	2–1
Lazio	2–0	1–3	1–0	1–1	3–2	0–0	1–0	1–2	3–1	0–1		1–1	2–0	3–1	3–0	0–0	1–0	2–1	1–1	2–2
Lecce	1–2	0–0	0–2	0–1	0–0	2–2	0–1	2–2	1–0	0–1	2–3		3–4	0–2	1–1	1–1	1–2	4–2	4–1	0–2
Milan	2–0	1–1	3–0	4–0	1–0	4–0	1–2	1–0	0–1	1–1	2–2	2–0		0–0	2–1	3–0	4–1	2–1	2–0	1–1
Napoli	1–3	1–1	6–3	2–2	0–0	2–0	0–0	6–1	1–0	3–3	0–0	4–2	3–1		2–0	2–0	1–2	1–3	2–1	2–0
Novara	0–0	0–2	0–0	3–3	3–0	1–2	0–3	1–1	3–1	0–4	2–1	0–0	0–3	1–1		2–2	2–1	0–2	1–1	1–0
Palermo	2–1	3–1	3–2	1–1	0–1	4–4	2–0	5–3	4–3	0–2	5–1	2–0	0–4	1–3	2–0		1–2	0–1	2–0	1–1
Parma	1–2	1–0	3–0	3–3	2–0	2–1	2–2	3–1	3–1	0–0	3–1	3–3	0–2	1–2	2–0	0–0		0–1	3–1	2–0
Roma	3–1	1–1	1–2	2–2	5–1	2–0	1–2	1–0	4–0	1–1	1–2	2–1	2–3	2–2	5–2	1–0	1–0		1–1	3–1
Siena	2–2	1–1	3–0	0–1	2–0	4–1	0–0	0–2	0–1	0–1	4–0	3–0	1–4	1–1	0–2	4–1	0–2	1–0		1–0
Udinese	0–0	2–0	0–0	2–1	4–1	2–1	2–0	2–0	1–3	0–0	2–0	2–1	1–2	2–2	3–0	1–0	3–1	2–0	2–1	

Source: Lega Serie A
Legend: Blue = home team win; Yellow = draw; Red = away team win.

== Statistics ==
=== Top goalscorers ===
Rank	Player	Club	Goals
1	(Sweden) Zlatan Ibrahimović	Milan	28
2	(Argentina) Diego Milito	Internazionale	24
3	(Uruguay) Edinson Cavani	Napoli	23
3	(Italy) Antonio Di Natale	Udinese	23
5	(Argentina) Rodrigo Palacio	Genoa	19
6	(Argentina) Germán Denis	Atalanta	16
6	(Italy) Fabrizio Miccoli	Palermo	16
8	(Italy) Sebastian Giovinco	Parma	15
9	(Montenegro) Stevan Jovetić	Fiorentina	14
10	(Germany) Miroslav Klose	Lazio	12
10	(Italy) Mattia Destro	Siena	12

=== Hat-tricks ===
Player	For	Against	Result	Date
Edinson Cavani	Napoli	Milan	3–1	18 September 2011
Kevin-Prince Boateng	Milan	Lecce	4–3	23 October 2011
Antonio Nocerino	Milan	Parma	4–1	26 October 2011
Diego Milito^{4}	Internazionale	Palermo	4–4	1 February 2012
Fabrizio Miccoli	Palermo	Internazionale	4–4	1 February 2012
Germán Denis	Atalanta	Roma	4–1	26 February 2012
Zlatan Ibrahimović	Milan	Palermo	4–0	3 March 2012
Joaquín Larrivey	Cagliari	Napoli	3–6	9 March 2012
Mauricio Pinilla	Cagliari	Cesena	3–0	18 March 2012
Diego Milito	Internazionale	Genoa	5–4	1 April 2012
Diego Milito	Internazionale	Milan	4–2	6 May 2012
Fabrizio Miccoli	Palermo	Chievo	4–4	6 May 2012
Marco Rigoni	Novara	Cesena	3–0	6 May 2012

== Awards ==
The Gran Galà del Calcio AIC 2012 was the second edition of the awards ceremony organized by the Italian Footballers' Association (AIC), recognizing the best performers of the 2011–12 Serie A. The awards were presented on 27 January 2013 at the Teatro Dal Verme in Milan.

Award	Winner	Club
Player of the Year	(Italy) Andrea Pirlo	Juventus
Coach of the Year	(Italy) Antonio Conte	Juventus
Best Young Player	(Italy) Stephan El Shaarawy / (Colombia) Luis Muriel	Milan / Udinese
Best Club	Juventus	Juventus
Best Referee	(Italy) Nicola Rizzoli	

AIC Team of the Year
Goalkeeper	(Italy) Gianluigi Buffon (Juventus)			
Defence	(Italy) Christian Maggio (Napoli)	(Italy) Andrea Barzagli (Juventus)	(Brazil) Thiago Silva (Milan)	(Italy) Federico Balzaretti (Palermo)
Midfield	(Italy) Claudio Marchisio (Juventus)		(Italy) Andrea Pirlo (Juventus)	(Italy) Antonio Nocerino (Milan)
Attack	(Sweden) Zlatan Ibrahimović (Milan)		(Uruguay) Edinson Cavani (Napoli)	(Italy) Antonio Di Natale (Udinese)

== Attendances ==
No.	Club	Avg. attendance	Highest
1	Milan	49,020	79,522
2	Internazionale	44,806	78,222
3	Napoli	39,808	57,402
4	Juventus	37,545	40,944
5	Roma	36,219	50,801
6	Lazio	32,410	57,148
7	Fiorentina	21,412	36,387
8	Bologna	19,257	30,321
9	Palermo	19,218	28,941
10	Genoa	18,698	27,527
11	Udinese	18,595	28,588
12	Cesena	16,410	23,343
13	Atalanta	15,492	22,335
14	Catania	15,387	20,839
15	Parma	13,646	19,481
16	Novara	10,957	17,649
17	Cagliari	10,698	20,120
18	Siena	10,128	15,265
19	Lecce	9,961	23,298
20	ChievoVerona	9,649	22,000
