= 2021–22 Serie A =

120th season of top-tier Italian football

Serie A
- Season: 2021–22
- Dates: 21 August 2021 – 22 May 2022
- Champions: AC Milan; 19th title
- Relegated: Cagliari; Genoa; Venezia
- Champions League: AC Milan; Inter Milan; Napoli; Juventus
- Europa League: Lazio; Roma
- Europa Conference League: Fiorentina
- Matches: 380
- Goals: 1,089 (2.87 per match)
- Top goalscorer: Ciro Immobile (27 goals)
- Biggest home win: Fiorentina 6–0 Genoa (17 January 2022)
- Biggest away win: Salernitana 0–5 Inter Milan (17 December 2021)
- Highest scoring: Lazio 4–4 Udinese (2 December 2021); Udinese 2–6 Atalanta (9 January 2022); Atalanta 4–4 Torino (27 April 2022)
- Longest winning run: Inter Milan; Napoli (8 matches)
- Longest unbeaten run: AC Milan; Juventus (16 matches)
- Longest winless run: Genoa (26 matches)
- Longest losing run: Venezia (10 matches)
- Highest attendance: 74,947; Inter Milan 3–1 Roma (23 April 2022)
- Lowest attendance: 2,511; Empoli 1–2 Venezia (11 September 2021)
- Total attendance: 6,908,853
- Average attendance: 18,181

The 2021–22 Serie A (known as the Serie A TIM for sponsorship reasons) was the 120th season of top-tier Italian football, the 90th in a round-robin tournament, and the 12th since its organization under an own league committee, the Lega Serie A. AC Milan won the title after defeating Sassuolo 3–0 at the Mapei Stadium – Città del Tricolore on 22 May 2022, the final matchday of the season.

AC Milan's title marked their 19th league title in their history and their first since 2011. Inter Milan, the defending champions, finished in second place, two points behind AC Milan.

== Teams ==
Two teams, Venezia and Salernitana, both returned to the Serie A after historically long absences. Venezia defeated Cittadella in the final of the promotion playoffs to secure readmission into the top league for the first time in 19 years—since the 2001-2002 season. Salernitana, meanwhile, were able to play their first Serie A match in 23 years, for the first time since 1999. Empoli returned after a two-year absence.

Crotone and Benevento were relegated to the Serie B after spending just one year each in the Serie A. Parma was relegated after a three-year stint.

=== Team changes ===
| Promoted from 2020–21 Serie B | Relegated from 2020–21 Serie A |
|---|---|
| Empoli | Benevento |
| Salernitana | Crotone |
| Venezia | Parma |

=== Stadiums and locations ===
Locations of the 2021–22 Serie A teams

| Team | Home city | Stadium | Capacity |
|---|---|---|---|
| Atalanta | Bergamo | Gewiss Stadium | 19,768 |
| Bologna | Bologna | Stadio Renato Dall'Ara | 36,462 |
| Cagliari | Cagliari | Sardegna Arena | 16,416 |
| Empoli | Empoli | Stadio Carlo Castellani | 16,284 |
| Fiorentina | Florence | Stadio Artemio Franchi | 43,147 |
| Genoa | Genoa | Stadio Luigi Ferraris | 36,599 |
| Hellas Verona | Verona | Stadio Marcantonio Bentegodi | 39,371 |
| Inter Milan | Milan | San Siro | 75,923 |
| Juventus | Turin | Allianz Stadium | 41,507 |
| Lazio | Rome | Stadio Olimpico | 70,634 |
| Milan | Milan | San Siro | 75,923 |
| Napoli | Naples | Stadio Diego Armando Maradona | 54,726 |
| Roma | Rome | Stadio Olimpico | 70,634 |
| Salernitana | Salerno | Stadio Arechi | 26,000 |
| Sampdoria | Genoa | Stadio Luigi Ferraris | 36,599 |
| Sassuolo | Sassuolo | Mapei Stadium (Reggio Emilia) | 21,525 |
| Spezia | La Spezia | Stadio Alberto Picco | 11,512 |
| Torino | Turin | Stadio Olimpico Grande Torino | 28,958 |
| Udinese | Udine | Stadio Friuli | 25,144 |
| Venezia | Venice | Stadio Pier Luigi Penzo | 11,150 |

=== Personnel and kits ===
| Team | Manager | Captain | Kit manufacturer | Shirt sponsor(s) | |
| Team | Manager | Captain | Kit manufacturer | Main | Other |
|---|---|---|---|---|---|
| AC Milan | (Italy) Stefano Pioli | (Italy) Alessio Romagnoli | Puma | Emirates | Back: wefox; Sleeves: BitMEX |
| Atalanta | (Italy) Gian Piero Gasperini | (Italy) Rafael Tolói | Joma | Plus500 | Front: Radici Group; Back: Gewiss; Sleeves: Automha |
| Bologna | (Serbia) Siniša Mihajlović | (Italy) Roberto Soriano | Macron | Facile Ristrutturare | Front: Selenella; Back: Illumia; Sleeves: Scala |
| Cagliari | (Italy) Alessandro Agostini (caretaker) | (Italy) João Pedro | Adidas | ISOLA Artigianato di Sardegna | Front: Tiscali; Back: Ichnusa; Sleeves: Latte Arborea |
| Empoli | (Italy) Aurelio Andreazzoli | (Italy) Simone Romagnoli | Kappa | Computer Gross | Front: Sammontana (H)/Saint-Gobain (A); Back: Pediatrica; Sleeves: Contrader |
| Fiorentina | (Italy) Vincenzo Italiano | (Italy) Cristiano Biraghi | Kappa | Mediacom | Back: Prima.it; Sleeves: Estra |
| Genoa | (Germany) Alexander Blessin | (Italy) Domenico Criscito | Kappa | MG.K Vis | Front: La Mia Liguria/Euroflora; Back: Leaseplan; Sleeves: Synlab |
| Hellas Verona | (Croatia) Igor Tudor | (Portugal) Miguel Veloso | Macron | Gruppo Sinergy | Front: Omega Group/Manila Grace; Back: VetroCar; Sleeves: Restructure 5.0 |
| Inter Milan | (Italy) Simone Inzaghi | (Slovenia) Samir Handanović | Nike | $INTER Fan Token | Back: Lenovo; Sleeves: DigitalBits |
| Juventus | (Italy) Massimiliano Allegri | (Italy) Giorgio Chiellini | Adidas | Jeep 4xe | Back: Cygames; Sleeves: $JUV Fan Token/Bitget |
| Lazio | (Italy) Maurizio Sarri | (Italy) Ciro Immobile | Macron | Binance | Sleeves: Frecciarossa |
| Napoli | (Italy) Luciano Spalletti | (Italy) Lorenzo Insigne | EA7 | Lete | Front: MSC Cruises; Back: Floki Inu; Sleeves: Amazon |
| Roma | (Portugal) José Mourinho | (Italy) Lorenzo Pellegrini | New Balance | DigitalBits | Back: Hyundai; Sleeves: UNHCR |
| Salernitana | (Italy) Davide Nicola | (France) Franck Ribéry | Zeus | BCC Aquara/Caffè Motta | Front: Re d'Italia Art; Back: Distretti Ecologici; Sleeves: Eté Supermercati |
| Sampdoria | (Italy) Marco Giampaolo | (Italy) Fabio Quagliarella | Macron | Banca Ifis | Front: La Mia Liguria/Euroflora; Back: IBSA Group; Sleeves: UNHCR/Auto EVO |
| Sassuolo | (Italy) Alessio Dionisi | (Italy) Francesco Magnanelli | Puma | Mapei | None |
| Spezia | (Italy) Thiago Motta | (Italy) Giulio Maggiore | Acerbis | Distretti Ecologici | Front: La Mia Liguria; Back: Bitci/Recrowd; Sleeves: Iozzelli Design |
| Torino | (Croatia) Ivan Jurić | (Italy) Andrea Belotti | Joma | Suzuki | Front: Fratelli Beretta; Back: EdiliziAcrobatica; Sleeves: N° 38 Wüber |
| Udinese | (Italy) Gabriele Cioffi (caretaker) | (Netherlands) Bram Nuytinck | Macron | Dacia | Front: Kiba Inu; Back: Bluenergy; Sleeves: Prosciutto di San Daniele |
| Venezia | (Italy) Andrea Soncin (caretaker) | (Italy) Marco Modolo | Kappa | Green Project Agency | Back: DR Automobiles; Sleeves: Bechèr |

=== Managerial changes ===
| Team | Outgoing manager | Manner of departure | Date of vacancy | Position in table | Replaced by | Date of appointment |
|---|---|---|---|---|---|---|
| Napoli | (Italy) Gennaro Gattuso | Mutual consent | 23 May 2021 | Pre-season | (Italy) Luciano Spalletti | 1 July 2021 |
| Inter Milan | (Italy) Antonio Conte | Mutual consent | 26 May 2021 | Pre-season | (Italy) Simone Inzaghi | 1 July 2021 |
| Hellas Verona | (Croatia) Ivan Jurić | Mutual consent | 28 May 2021 | Pre-season | (Italy) Eusebio Di Francesco | 1 July 2021 |
| Empoli | (Italy) Alessio Dionisi | Mutual consent | 15 June 2021 | Pre-season | (Italy) Aurelio Andreazzoli | 1 July 2021 |
| Juventus | (Italy) Andrea Pirlo | Sacked | 28 May 2021 | Pre-season | (Italy) Massimiliano Allegri | 1 July 2021 |
| Roma | (Portugal) Paulo Fonseca | End of contract | 30 June 2021 | Pre-season | (Portugal) José Mourinho | 1 July 2021 |
| Fiorentina | (Italy) Giuseppe Iachini | End of contract | 30 June 2021 | Pre-season | (Italy) Vincenzo Italiano | 1 July 2021 |
| Sassuolo | (Italy) Roberto De Zerbi | End of contract | 30 June 2021 | Pre-season | (Italy) Alessio Dionisi | 1 July 2021 |
| Sampdoria | (Italy) Claudio Ranieri | End of contract | 30 June 2021 | Pre-season | (Italy) Roberto D'Aversa | 4 July 2021 |
| Lazio | (Italy) Simone Inzaghi | End of contract | 30 June 2021 | Pre-season | (Italy) Maurizio Sarri | 1 July 2021 |
| Torino | (Italy) Davide Nicola | End of contract | 30 June 2021 | Pre-season | (Croatia) Ivan Jurić | 1 July 2021 |
| Spezia | (Italy) Vincenzo Italiano | Signed by Fiorentina | 30 June 2021 | Pre-season | (Italy) Thiago Motta | 8 July 2021 |
| Hellas Verona | (Italy) Eusebio Di Francesco | Sacked | 14 September 2021 | 19th | (Croatia) Igor Tudor | 14 September 2021 |
| Cagliari | (Italy) Leonardo Semplici | Sacked | 14 September 2021 | 17th | (Italy) Walter Mazzarri | 15 September 2021 |
| Salernitana | (Italy) Fabrizio Castori | Sacked | 17 October 2021 | 20th | (Italy) Stefano Colantuono | 17 October 2021 |
| Genoa | (Italy) Davide Ballardini | Sacked | 6 November 2021 | 17th | (Ukraine) Andriy Shevchenko | 7 November 2021 |
| Udinese | (Italy) Luca Gotti | Sacked | 7 December 2021 | 14th | (Italy) Gabriele Cioffi (caretaker) | 7 December 2021 |
| Genoa | (Ukraine) Andriy Shevchenko | Sacked | 15 January 2022 | 19th | (France) Abdoulay Konko (caretaker) | 15 January 2022 |
| Sampdoria | (Italy) Roberto D'Aversa | Sacked | 17 January 2022 | 16th | (Italy) Marco Giampaolo | 19 January 2022 |
| Genoa | (France) Abdoulay Konko | End of caretaker spell | 19 January 2022 | 19th | (Germany) Alexander Blessin | 19 January 2022 |
| Salernitana | (Italy) Stefano Colantuono | Sacked | 15 February 2022 | 20th | (Italy) Davide Nicola | 15 February 2022 |
| Venezia | (Italy) Paolo Zanetti | Sacked | 27 April 2022 | 20th | (Italy) Andrea Soncin (caretaker) | 27 April 2022 |
| Cagliari | (Italy) Walter Mazzarri | Sacked | 2 May 2022 | 17th | (Italy) Alessandro Agostini (caretaker) | 2 May 2022 |

== League table ==
| Pos | Team | Pld | W | D | L | GF | GA | GD | Pts | Qualification or relegation |
|---|---|---|---|---|---|---|---|---|---|---|
| 1 | Milan (C) | 38 | 26 | 8 | 4 | 69 | 31 | +38 | 86 | Qualification for the Champions League group stage |
| 2 | Inter Milan | 38 | 25 | 9 | 4 | 84 | 32 | +52 | 84 | Qualification for the Champions League group stage |
| 3 | Napoli | 38 | 24 | 7 | 7 | 74 | 31 | +43 | 79 | Qualification for the Champions League group stage |
| 4 | Juventus | 38 | 20 | 10 | 8 | 57 | 37 | +20 | 70 | Qualification for the Champions League group stage |
| 5 | Lazio | 38 | 18 | 10 | 10 | 77 | 58 | +19 | 64 | Qualification for the Europa League group stage (Note: Since the winners of the 2021–22 Coppa Italia, Inter Milan, qualified for the Champions League, the Europa League berth awarded to the Coppa Italia winners was passed to the sixth-placed team, and the Europa Conference League berth awarded to the sixth-placed team was passed to the seventh-placed team.) |
| 6 | Roma | 38 | 18 | 9 | 11 | 59 | 43 | +16 | 63 | Qualification for the Europa League group stage |
| 7 | Fiorentina | 38 | 19 | 5 | 14 | 59 | 51 | +8 | 62 | Qualification for the Conference League play-off round |
| 8 | Atalanta | 38 | 16 | 11 | 11 | 65 | 48 | +17 | 59 | |
| 9 | Hellas Verona | 38 | 14 | 11 | 13 | 65 | 59 | +6 | 53 | |
| 10 | Torino | 38 | 13 | 11 | 14 | 46 | 41 | +5 | 50 (Note: Torino finished ahead of Sassuolo on head-to-head points: Sassuolo 0–1 Torino, Torino 1–1 Sassuolo.) | |
| 11 | Sassuolo | 38 | 13 | 11 | 14 | 64 | 66 | −2 | 50 | |
| 12 | Udinese | 38 | 11 | 14 | 13 | 61 | 58 | +3 | 47 | |
| 13 | Bologna | 38 | 12 | 10 | 16 | 44 | 55 | −11 | 46 | |
| 14 | Empoli | 38 | 10 | 11 | 17 | 50 | 70 | −20 | 41 | |
| 15 | Sampdoria | 38 | 10 | 6 | 22 | 46 | 63 | −17 | 36 | |
| 16 | Spezia | 38 | 10 | 6 | 22 | 41 | 71 | −30 | 36 | |
| 17 | Salernitana | 38 | 7 | 10 | 21 | 33 | 78 | −45 | 31 | |
| 18 | Cagliari (R) | 38 | 6 | 12 | 20 | 34 | 68 | −34 | 30 | Relegation to Serie B |
| 19 | Genoa (R) | 38 | 4 | 16 | 18 | 27 | 60 | −33 | 28 | Relegation to Serie B |
| 20 | Venezia (R) | 38 | 6 | 9 | 23 | 34 | 69 | −35 | 27 | Relegation to Serie B |

Source: Serie A
Rules for classification: 1) Points; 2) Head-to-head points; 3) Head-to-head goal difference; 4) Goal difference; 5) Goals scored; 6) Draw. (Note: Head-to-head record is used only after all the matches between the teams in question have been played)
(C) Champions; (R) Relegated

== Results ==
| Home \ Away | ATA | BOL | CAG | EMP | FIO | GEN | HEL | INT | JUV | LAZ | MIL | NAP | ROM | SAL | SAM | SAS | SPE | TOR | UDI | VEN |
|---|---|---|---|---|---|---|---|---|---|---|---|---|---|---|---|---|---|---|---|---|
| Atalanta | — | 0–0 | 1–2 | 0–1 | 1–2 | 0–0 | 1–2 | 0–0 | 1–1 | 2–2 | 2–3 | 1–3 | 1–4 | 1–1 | 4–0 | 2–1 | 5–2 | 4–4 | 1–1 | 4–0 |
| Bologna | 0–1 | — | 2–0 | 0–0 | 2–3 | 2–2 | 1–0 | 2–1 | 0–2 | 3–0 | 2–4 | 0–2 | 1–0 | 3–2 | 2–0 | 1–3 | 2–1 | 0–0 | 2–2 | 0–1 |
| Cagliari | 1–2 | 2–1 | — | 0–2 | 1–1 | 2–3 | 1–2 | 1–3 | 1–2 | 0–3 | 0–1 | 1–1 | 1–2 | 1–1 | 3–1 | 1–0 | 2–2 | 1–1 | 0–4 | 1–1 |
| Empoli | 1–4 | 4–2 | 1–1 | — | 2–1 | 2–2 | 1–1 | 0–2 | 2–3 | 1–3 | 2–4 | 3–2 | 2–4 | 1–1 | 0–3 | 1–5 | 0–0 | 1–3 | 3–1 | 1–2 |
| Fiorentina | 1–0 | 1–0 | 3–0 | 1–0 | — | 6–0 | 1–1 | 1–3 | 2–0 | 0–3 | 4–3 | 1–2 | 2–0 | 4–0 | 3–1 | 2–2 | 3–0 | 2–1 | 0–4 | 1–0 |
| Genoa | 0–0 | 0–1 | 1–0 | 0–0 | 1–2 | — | 3–3 | 0–0 | 2–1 | 1–4 | 0–3 | 1–2 | 0–2 | 1–1 | 1–3 | 2–2 | 0–1 | 1–0 | 0–0 | 0–0 |
| Hellas Verona | 1–2 | 2–1 | 0–0 | 2–1 | 1–1 | 1–0 | — | 1–3 | 2–1 | 4–1 | 1–3 | 1–2 | 3–2 | 1–2 | 1–1 | 2–3 | 4–0 | 0–1 | 4–0 | 3–1 |
| Inter Milan | 2–2 | 6–1 | 4–0 | 4–2 | 1–1 | 4–0 | 2–0 | — | 1–1 | 2–1 | 1–2 | 3–2 | 3–1 | 5–0 | 3–0 | 0–2 | 2–0 | 1–0 | 2–0 | 2–1 |
| Juventus | 0–1 | 1–1 | 2–0 | 0–1 | 1–0 | 2–0 | 2–0 | 0–1 | — | 2–2 | 1–1 | 1–1 | 1–0 | 2–0 | 3–2 | 1–2 | 1–0 | 1–1 | 2–0 | 2–1 |
| Lazio | 0–0 | 3–0 | 2–2 | 3–3 | 1–0 | 3–1 | 3–3 | 3–1 | 0–2 | — | 1–2 | 1–2 | 3–2 | 3–0 | 2–0 | 2–1 | 6–1 | 1–1 | 4–4 | 1–0 |
| Milan | 2–0 | 0–0 | 4–1 | 1–0 | 1–0 | 2–0 | 3–2 | 1–1 | 0–0 | 2–0 | — | 0–1 | 3–1 | 2–0 | 1–0 | 1–3 | 1–2 | 1–0 | 1–1 | 2–0 |
| Napoli | 2–3 | 3–0 | 2–0 | 0–1 | 2–3 | 3–0 | 1–1 | 1–1 | 2–1 | 4–0 | 0–1 | — | 1–1 | 4–1 | 1–0 | 6–1 | 0–1 | 1–0 | 2–1 | 2–0 |
| Roma | 1–0 | 0–0 | 1–0 | 2–0 | 3–1 | 0–0 | 2–2 | 0–3 | 3–4 | 3–0 | 1–2 | 0–0 | — | 2–1 | 1–1 | 2–1 | 2–0 | 1–0 | 1–0 | 1–1 |
| Salernitana | 0–1 | 1–1 | 1–1 | 2–4 | 2–1 | 1–0 | 2–2 | 0–5 | 0–2 | 0–3 | 2–2 | 0–1 | 0–4 | — | 0–2 | 2–2 | 2–2 | 0–1 | 0–4 | 2–1 |
| Sampdoria | 1–3 | 1–2 | 1–2 | 2–0 | 4–1 | 1–0 | 3–1 | 2–2 | 1–3 | 1–3 | 0–1 | 0–4 | 0–1 | 1–2 | — | 4–0 | 2–1 | 1–2 | 3–3 | 1–1 |
| Sassuolo | 2–1 | 0–3 | 2–2 | 1–2 | 2–1 | 1–1 | 2–4 | 1–2 | 1–2 | 2–1 | 0–3 | 2–2 | 2–2 | 1–0 | 0–0 | — | 4–1 | 0–1 | 1–1 | 3–1 |
| Spezia | 1–3 | 0–1 | 2–0 | 1–1 | 1–2 | 1–1 | 1–2 | 1–3 | 2–3 | 3–4 | 1–2 | 0–3 | 0–1 | 2–1 | 1–0 | 2–2 | — | 1–0 | 0–1 | 1–0 |
| Torino | 1–2 | 2–1 | 1–2 | 2–2 | 4–0 | 3–2 | 1–0 | 1–1 | 0–1 | 1–1 | 0–0 | 0–1 | 0–3 | 4–0 | 3–0 | 1–1 | 2–1 | — | 2–1 | 1–2 |
| Udinese | 2–6 | 1–1 | 5–1 | 4–1 | 0–1 | 0–0 | 1–1 | 1–2 | 2–2 | 1–1 | 1–1 | 0–4 | 1–1 | 0–1 | 2–1 | 3–2 | 2–3 | 2–0 | — | 3–0 |
| Venezia | 1–3 | 4–3 | 0–0 | 1–1 | 1–0 | 1–1 | 3–4 | 0–2 | 1–1 | 1–3 | 0–3 | 0–2 | 3–2 | 1–2 | 0–2 | 1–4 | 1–2 | 1–1 | 1–2 | — |

Source: Serie A
Legend: Blue = home team win; Yellow = draw; Red = away team win.
For upcoming matches, an "a" indicates there is an article about the rivalry between the two participants.

== Season statistics ==
=== Top goalscorers ===
| Rank | Player | Club | Goals |
|---|---|---|---|
| 1 | (Italy) Ciro Immobile | Lazio | 27 |
| 2 | (Serbia) Dušan Vlahović | Fiorentina/Juventus^{1} | 24 |
| 3 | (Argentina) Lautaro Martínez | Inter Milan | 21 |
| 4 | (England) Tammy Abraham | Roma | 17 |
| 4 | (Argentina) Giovanni Simeone | Hellas Verona | 17 |
| 6 | (Italy) Gianluca Scamacca | Sassuolo | 16 |
| 7 | (Italy) Domenico Berardi | Sassuolo | 15 |
| 8 | (Austria) Marko Arnautović | Bologna | 14 |
| 8 | (Nigeria) Victor Osimhen | Napoli | 14 |
| 10 | (Spain) Gerard Deulofeu | Udinese | 13 |
| 10 | (Bosnia and Herzegovina) Edin Džeko | Inter Milan | 13 |
| 10 | (Croatia) Mario Pašalić | Atalanta | 13 |
| 10 | (Italy) João Pedro | Cagliari | 13 |
| 10 | (Italy) Andrea Pinamonti | Empoli | 13 |

^{1} Vlahović played for Fiorentina until matchday 23 and scored 17 goals.

=== Hat-tricks ===
| Player | Club | Against | Result | Date |
|---|---|---|---|---|
| (Italy) Ciro Immobile | Lazio | Spezia | 6–1 (H) | 28 August 2021 |
| (Argentina) Giovanni Simeone^{4} | Hellas Verona | Lazio | 4–1 (H) | 24 October 2021 |
| (Serbia) Dušan Vlahović | Fiorentina | Spezia | 3–0 (H) | 31 October 2021 |
| (Croatia) Mario Pašalić | Atalanta | Venezia | 4–0 (H) | 30 November 2021 |
| (Czech Republic) Antonín Barák | Hellas Verona | Sassuolo | 4–2 (A) | 16 January 2022 |
| (Argentina) Giovanni Simeone | Hellas Verona | Venezia | 3–1 (H) | 27 February 2022 |
| (Argentina) Lautaro Martínez | Inter Milan | Salernitana | 5–0 (H) | 4 March 2022 |
| (Guinea-Bissau) Beto | Udinese | Cagliari | 5–1 (H) | 3 April 2022 |
| (Italy) Ciro Immobile | Lazio | Genoa | 4–1 (A) | 10 April 2022 |
| (Italy) Andrea Belotti | Torino | Empoli | 3–1 (A) | 1 May 2022 |

Notes

^{4} Player scored 4 goals
(H) – Home team
(A) – Away team

=== Clean sheets ===
| Rank | Player | Club | Clean sheets |
|---|---|---|---|
| 1 | (France) Mike Maignan | AC Milan | 17 |
| 2 | (Slovenia) Samir Handanović | Inter Milan | 15 |
| 2 | (Portugal) Rui Patrício | Roma | 15 |
| 4 | (Colombia) David Ospina | Napoli | 13 |
| 5 | (Poland) Łukasz Skorupski | Bologna | 12 |
| 5 | (Poland) Wojciech Szczęsny | Juventus | 12 |
| 7 | (Italy) Salvatore Sirigu | Genoa | 10 |
| 8 | (Italy) Pietro Terracciano | Fiorentina | 9 |
| 9 | (Argentina) Juan Musso | Atalanta | 8 |
| 10 | (Italy) Ivan Provedel | Spezia | 7 |
| 10 | (Italy) Marco Silvestri | Udinese | 7 |
| 10 | (Albania) Thomas Strakosha | Lazio | 7 |
| 10 | (Italy) Guglielmo Vicario | Empoli | 7 |

=== Discipline ===
==== Player ====
- Most yellow cards: 14
  - (France) Maxime Lopez (Sassuolo)
  - (Italy) Gianluca Mancini (Roma)
- Most red cards: 2
  - (France) Kelvin Amian (Spezia)
  - (Wales) Ethan Ampadu (Venezia)
  - (France) Théo Hernandez (AC Milan)
  - (Norway) Leo Skiri Østigård (Genoa)
  - (Italy) Roberto Soriano (Bologna)
  - (France) Adama Soumaoro (Bologna)
  - (Italy) Nicolò Zaniolo (Roma)

==== Team ====
- Most yellow cards: 106
  - Venezia
- Most red cards: 9
  - Venezia
- Fewest yellow cards: 63
  - Napoli
- Fewest red cards: 1
  - Inter Milan
  - Juventus

== Awards ==
=== Monthly awards ===
| Month | Player of the Month | | Coach of the Month | | Goal of the Month | |
| Month | Player | Club | Coach | Club | Player | Club |
|---|---|---|---|---|---|---|
| September | (Senegal) Kalidou Koulibaly | Napoli | (Italy) Luciano Spalletti | Napoli | (Italy) Lorenzo Pellegrini | Roma |
| October | (Argentina) Giovanni Simeone | Hellas Verona | (Italy) Stefano Pioli | Milan | (Italy) Antonio Candreva | Sampdoria |
| November | (Turkey) Hakan Çalhanoğlu | Inter Milan | (Italy) Gian Piero Gasperini | Atalanta | (Senegal) Keita Baldé | Cagliari |
| December | (Serbia) Dušan Vlahović | Fiorentina | (Italy) Simone Inzaghi | Inter Milan | (Colombia) Juan Cuadrado | Juventus |
| January | (Italy) Giacomo Raspadori | Sassuolo | (Italy) Thiago Motta | Spezia | (Italy) Lorenzo Pellegrini | Roma |
| February | (Ukraine) Ruslan Malinovskyi | Atalanta | (Italy) Luciano Spalletti | Napoli | (Ukraine) Ruslan Malinovskyi | Atalanta |
| March | (Nigeria) Victor Osimhen | Napoli | (Italy) Stefano Pioli | Milan | (Italy) Lorenzo Pellegrini | Roma |
| April | (Croatia) Marcelo Brozović | Inter Milan | (Serbia) Siniša Mihajlović | Bologna | (Croatia) Ivan Perišić | Inter Milan |
| May | (Italy) Sandro Tonali | AC Milan | (Italy) Stefano Pioli | AC Milan | (France) Théo Hernandez | AC Milan |

=== Seasonal awards ===
| Award | Winner | Club | Ref. |
|---|---|---|---|
| Most Valuable Player | (Portugal) Rafael Leão | AC Milan | |
| Best Under-23 | (Nigeria) Victor Osimhen | Napoli | |
| Best Goalkeeper | (France) Mike Maignan | AC Milan | |
| Best Defender | (Brazil) Bremer | Torino | |
| Best Midfielder | (Croatia) Marcelo Brozović | Inter Milan | |
| Best Striker | (Italy) Ciro Immobile | Lazio | |
| Coach of the Season | (Italy) Stefano Pioli | AC Milan | |
| Goal of the Season | (France) Théo Hernandez | AC Milan | |

Team of the Year
| Goalkeeper | (France) Mike Maignan (AC Milan) | | | |
| Defence | (Italy) Giovanni Di Lorenzo (Napoli) | (Brazil) Bremer (Torino) | (England) Fikayo Tomori (AC Milan) | (France) Théo Hernandez (AC Milan) |
| Midfield | (Croatia) Marcelo Brozović (Inter Milan) | | (Italy) Nicolò Barella (Inter Milan) | (Serbia) Sergej Milinković-Savić (Lazio) |
| Attack | (Italy) Ciro Immobile (Lazio) | | (Serbia) Dušan Vlahović (Fiorentina/Juventus) | (Portugal) Rafael Leão (AC Milan) |
