= Nedo Sonetti =

Italian footballer and manager

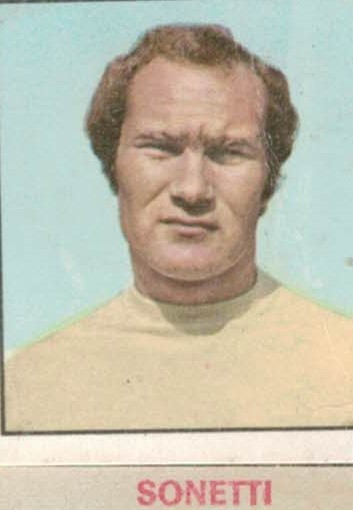

Personal information
- Date of birth: 25 February 1941 (age 85)
- Place of birth: Piombino, Kingdom of Italy
- Position: Centre-back

Senior career*
Years	Team	Apps	(Gls)
- Spezia
- Reggina

Managerial career
- 1974–1975: Viareggio
- 1975–1976: Casertana
- 1976–1979: Spezia
- 1979–1980: Cosenza
- 1980–1983: Sambenedettese
- 1983–1987: Atalanta
- 1987–1989: Udinese
- 1989–1990: Avellino
- 1990–1991: Ascoli
- 1991–1992: Bologna
- 1993: Lecce
- 1993–1994: Monza
- 1994–1996: Torino
- 1996–1997: Cremonese
- 1997–1999: Lecce
- 1999–2000: Brescia
- 2000–2001: Salernitana
- 2001–2002: Cagliari
- 2003: Palermo
- 2003–2004: Ancona
- 2004–2005: Catania
- 2005–2006: Cagliari
- 2006–2007: Ascoli
- 2007: Cagliari
- 2008–2009: Brescia
- 2010: Vicenza
- * Club domestic league appearances and goals

Nedo Sonetti (born 25 February 1941) is an Italian football manager and former player, who played as a centre-back.

== Biography ==
Sonetti was born in Piombino, southern Tuscany and lives now in Gorle.

== Playing career ==
As a defender, Sonetti played in Serie B and Serie C for Spezia Calcio 1906 and Reggina.

== Managing career ==
As a manager, Sonetti has had a long career at the helm of several Serie A and Serie B teams in the whole country. Among the several teams he led, he had his major successes with Atalanta B.C., which he led from Serie B to a ninth place in Serie A, coaching the team for four seasons.

He is often considered a "replacement" coach, as he was often appointed in his career to replace fired managers from Serie A teams fighting to avoid relegation, or Serie B teams which managed to promote.

More recently, Sonetti joined Cagliari in November 2005, replacing Davide Ballardini, becoming the fourth coach appointed by the Sardinian team in a couple of months. He succeeded in maintaining his job until the end of the tournament, and in leading the rossoblù to maintain a place in the next Serie A; he left Cagliari at the end of the season. On 14 November 2006, Sonetti was appointed to replace Attilio Tesser at the helm of then last-placed relegation-battling Serie A Ascoli. He did not manage to save his side from falling to Serie B, and ended his experience in Ascoli at the end of the season with a second-last place. In November 2007 he returned at Cagliari for his third time, as he was appointed to replace Marco Giampaolo at the helm of the Sardinians. He resigned from his post on 19 December, but was confirmed by the club the next day after Marco Giampaolo rejected to return at the helm of the club. However, Sonetti was sacked only a few days later, after a 5–1 loss to Fiorentina, leaving the team last-placed in the league table, being replaced by Davide Ballardini. From 25 September 2008, he has been called back to Brescia replacing Serse Cosmi. On 19 May 2009 he was sacked himself, following a 2–1 loss to promotion rivals Grosseto that left Brescia in fourth placed, but with only a two-point lead to 7th-placed Triestina.

On 28 March 2010, 69-year-old Sonetti returned to management, replacing Rolando Maran as head coach of Serie B relegation battlers Vicenza. His stint as Vicenza head coach, as he was sacked on 15 April after only three games in charge, ended with respectively two draws and a loss.
