= Carlo Rigotti =

Italian footballer and manager (1906-1983)

Personal information
- Full name: Carlo Rigotti
- Date of birth: 10 February 1906
- Place of birth: Trieste, Austria-Hungary
- Date of death: 5 September 1983 (aged 77)
- Place of death: Arcore, Italy
- Position: Defender

Senior career*
Years	Team	Apps	(Gls)
1928–1933	Triestina	140	(1)
1933–1938	Milan	113	(0)
1938–1940	Novara	59	(0)
Total		312	(1)

Managerial career
- 1951–1953: Messina
- 1955–1956: Palermo
- 1956–1957: Cagliari
- 1957–1958: Atalanta
- 1958: Palermo
- 1960–1961: Cagliari
- 1962–1965: Chiasso
- * Club domestic league appearances and goals

Carlo Rigotti (10 February 1906 – 5 September 1983) was an Italian football player and manager who played as a defender in the 1930s.

== Playing career ==
Over the course of his career, Rigotti played for three Serie A clubs; he started his career with hometown side Triestina, then going on to play for Milan, where he served as the team's captain, and Novara.

== Managerial career ==
After retiring from playing, Rigotti became a manager at clubs in Italy and Switzerland.
