= Fluorsid =

Italian chemical company

Fluorsid SpA
- Type: Privately held company
- Industry: Chemical industry
- Founded: 17 April 1969; 57 years ago in Cagliari, Sardinia
- Founder: Carlo Enrico Giulini
- Headquarters: Milan, Italy
- Number of locations: 9 production plants (2021)
- Area served: Italy; Norway; Switzerland
- Key people: Tommaso Giulini (Chairman)| Lior Metzinger (CEO)
- Products: fluorine derivatives
- Brands: Gypsos
- Services: Manufacturing; Sales; Trading
- Revenue: €416 million (2020)
- Net income: ▲€32 million (2019)
- Number of employees: 252 (2019)
- Website: fluorsid.com/en/

Fluorsid S.p.A. is an Italian company active in the chemical industry, precisely involved in the production and sales of inorganic fluorine derivatives.

The historic production site is located in Macchiareddu, in the industrial area of Cagliari, in Sardinia, while other plants and offices are located in the Italian Peninsula and in Norway. The company also has a logistics site in Bahrain.

== History ==
Historically, since the Neolithic era, the populations that have inhabited Sardinia have always exploited the mineral wealths and varieties present in its subsoil. These mining activities grew considerably between the nineteenth and twentieth centuries: in 1850 there were more than 250 mining concessions. This period was dominated by the extraction of lead and zinc which made the fortune of Arburese, Iglesiente and the Barony of Siniscola regions. The sector, however, went into crisis after the Second World War and many of these mines were closed or downsized. On the contrary, however, in the same period there has been a boom in the fluorine and barium extraction sector, especially in Gerrei area. Therefore, many entrepreneurs, supported by the Autonomous Region of Sardinia through the Sardinian Mining Authority (it. Ente Minerario Sardo), chose to invest in this new business. Among these figures there was also Count Enrico Giulini, who already obtained the first mining concessions in 1953 and a few years later, on 17 April 1969, he founded Fluorsid based in the Genna Tres Montis mine, in the municipality of Silius. The company was specialized in the production of synthetic cryolite and aluminum fluoride. It immediately built, in Macchiareddu, a drying and bagging plant for fluorspar as well as one for briquetting the fluorite for steel and wet process, implemented in 1972. This process will be used until 1988, when it was decided to switch to dry production.

At the end of the 1980s, however, the problem of the enlargement of the ozone hole emerged: chlorofluorocarbons were considered the main culprits and some of these compounds were banned by the 1987 Montreal Protocol. This led to a strong crisis in the chemical industry linked to the production of fluorides (in particular hydrofluoric acid), for which the Silìus mine also entered into crisis. The Autonomous Region of Sardinia therefore decided to separate the mining sector from the production and commercial side, taking charge of the first aspect and contributing to 80% of the capital of the mines in Gerrei. Since 1990, Fluorsid left Silius and its business focused in the production and marketing of fluoroderivatives purchasing the raw material from other mines in the world, such as in South Africa, Morocco and China. In 2006, 100% of the raw materials were imported.

However, Sardinia had not been abandoned, on the contrary the industrial site of Macchiareddu was expanded, in the industrial area of Assemini, near Cagliari: in 2002 the sulfuric acid plant was started up with the production of steam by electricity and at the same time in the new Millennium the company began to grow at worldwide level and acquire other companies in the sector, also thanks to the arrival in 2005 of Tommaso Giulini, son of the founder, Count Carlo Enrico Giulini, who inherited the head of the company in 2005. With the closure of the Sardinian mines, in fact, the goal was to take advantage of the energy produced on site and, at the same time, increase production capacity, focus on innovative technologies and diversify production by focusing on the aluminum sector to seek new outlets in the Arab and Persian Gulf markets.

In fact, in 2010 ICIB was acquired, at the time the Italian leader in the market of hydrofluoric acid in solution and synthetic anhydride. In 2016, with an investment of 12.5 million euros, Fluorsid acquired the Norwegian company Noralf, the second largest European plant for production of aluminum fluoride. The following year, on the other hand, it acquired 50% of Simplis Logistics, the logistics platform in Bahrain for trade in Asian markets.

In Italy, in 2018, the chemical company Alkeemia was acquired together with its former Solvay plant in Porto Marghera for the production of anhydrous hydrofluoric acid, and in 2021 was created Fluorsid Deutschland, a German section born with the acquisition of 50% of CF Carbons, manufacturer of Chlorodifluoromethane, called also R22, in Frankfurt. However in October of the same year, Fluorsid sold both the subsidiary Alkeemia, including the related assets, namely the Porto Marghera plant, and the investment in Germany to a fund managed by the English investment company Blantyre Capital Limited.

Since 2019 all the subsidiaries of the Fluorsid Group have been unified and controlled under the Fluorsid brand.

== Products ==
The company is part of the fluorine value chain, with the production and marketing of its derivatives for the aluminum and special steels markets, through to the valorisation of the by-product GYPSOS, anhydrous calcium sulphate (better known as anhydrite), for the construction and cement industries. The production of sulfuric acid serves the producers of fertilizers, synthetic detergents and pharmaceutical companies.

Among the chemical products there are high density aluminum fluoride made with dry process, anhydrous hydrofluoric acid in aqueous version (from 2018 to 2021 even in anidrous form in Porto Marghera plant, then sold), sulfuric acid from molten sulfur with the Double Contact Double Absorption process, synthetic cryolite and calcium fluoride. Fluorsid produces also calcium sulphate in various forms (raw, milled or granular) and it is sold under the trade name Gypsos.

== Headquarters and production plants ==
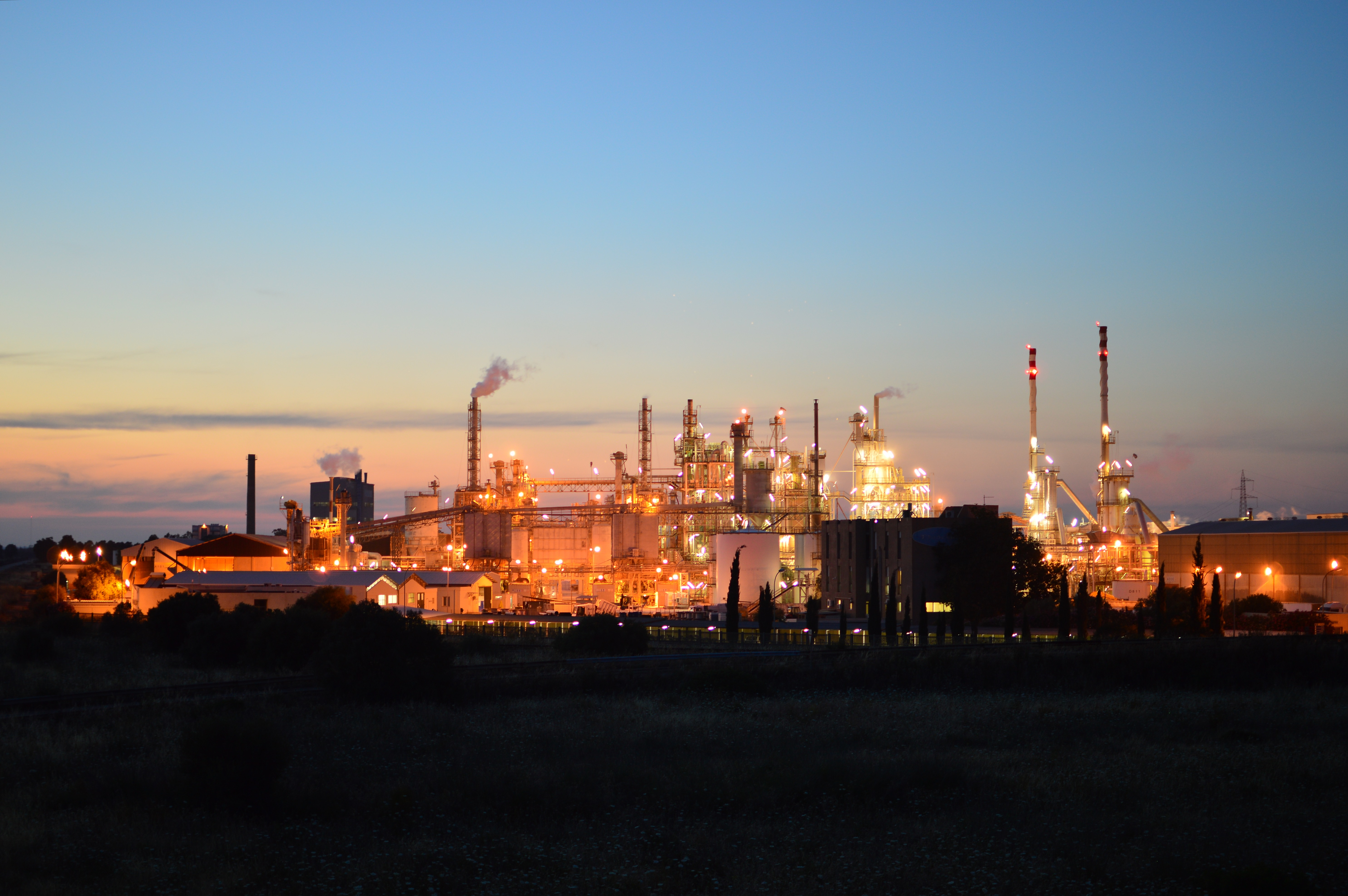
The production plant in Macchiareddu, in Sardinia

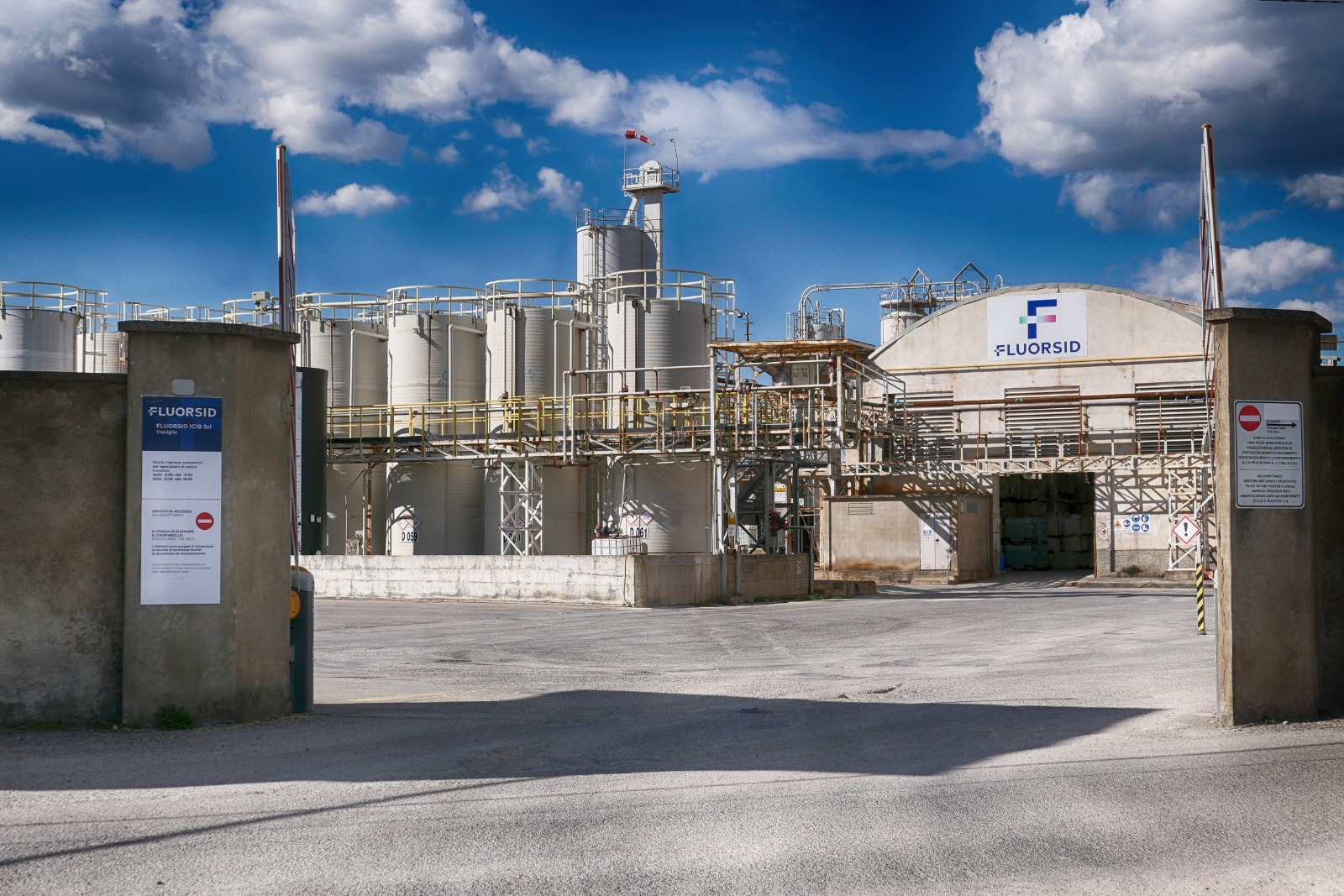
Entrance of the factory in Treviglio, near Bergamo

The administrative headquarters and the offices of the company are located in via Vegezio Milan, in the Citylife district, while the production plants are scattered in several countries in Europe.

The company's first plant, that is as well the registered office, is located in Macchiareddu (in the territory of Assemini), an industrial area on the outskirts of Cagliari, in Sardinia. It has been built when fluorite was still extracted in Gerrei. Here aluminum fluoride, sulfuric acid, synthetic cryolite, calcium fluoride and calcium sulfate are produced under the Gypsos brand. Aluminum fluoride is produced in five parallel production lines. The last two built, in 2008 and 2013, are equipped with highly efficient double-bed reactors. Sulfuric acid is produced in two parallel plants, the first built in 2002 and the second, of the same capacity, in 2013. The raw material for both plants is molten sulfur from nearby Saras in Sarroch's refinery, which guarantees the absence of dangerous dust. The process is highly exothermic and, thanks to a very efficient heat recovery, huge quantities of steam are generated and sent to two turbine generators of 5 and 7 MW capacity. These ones, starting from a zero-km by-product, allow the plant to be self-sufficient in terms of sulfuric acid, steam and electricity without the use of fuels, carbon dioxide emissions or other greenhouse gases.

In 2010 the group acquired ICIB, which had been the main producer of hydrofluoric acid since 1949, and settled in its Treviglio plant, in Bergamo area.

With the acquisition of Noralf in 2013, it is also present in Norway in the Odda plant, capable of producing around 40,000 tons per year of aluminum fluoride.

Finally, with the subsidiary Simplis Logistics, the company operates in Manama, Bahrain, in the logistics sector and in the transport of production materials.

In 2018 Fluorsid acquired from Solvay its plant in Porto Marghera, in the industrial area of Venice. Indeed here there was one of the biggest productions of hydrofluoric acid, in both anhydrous and aqueous form, and of fluoroderivatives (calcium sulphate). The company therefore settled here its company branch called Fluorsid Alkeemia. The plant had an area of 125,000 square meters and every year 27,000 tons of anhydrous hydrofluoric acid and 100,000 tons of calcium sulphate were produced. In February 2021 it was selected by the Italian Ministry of Economic Development for a European Union Project of Common Interest for the development of innovative lithium battery cells and systems. In October 2021 Fluorsid sold the controlled company Alkeemia and its plant.

In 2021, with the establishment of Fluorsid Deutschland, the company arrived in Germany at the Höchst plant, near Frankfurt Airport. The plant mainly produced chlorodifluoromethane, a raw material for many fluorine polymers such as PTFE and some special fluoroelastomers. The production capacity of the plant was about 24,000 MT per year and is managed through the partner Nouryon, the original owner of the site. In October of the same year, together with the sale of the subsidiary Alkeemia, there has been the sale of the 50% stake in CF Carbons which ended the activities on in Germany.

== Legal controversies ==
In May 2017 Fluorsid was implicated in an investigation for environmental disaster which also involved its top management with accusations of conspiracy and environmental crimes. At the end of the events, the company and the reference company were declared extraneous to the conduct, because the technical choices were not being made by the top management of Fluorsid. The agents of the Regional Forestry Corps seized two areas containing polluting materials: one of three hectares, next to the Fluorsid plant in Macchiareddu, in Sardinia, where there were piles of materials stored outdoors and one of five hectares in Terrasili, in the municipality of Assemini, for the storage of various materials. The warrant contested the presence of contamination by dispersion of harmful dust containing fluorine, the contamination of the soil by diffusion of fluorine dust, then ending up on grazing lands, and the contamination of groundwater and livestock by heavy metals and inorganic compounds, and contamination of livestock by fluorine in Macchiareddu. The investigation closed in December 2018 bringing the number of suspects to 15, which then rose to 22 including managers of public control bodies.

On 26 June 2019, the company presented an investment plan of approximately 22 million euros to modernize the area around the Macchiareddu plant and further improve compliance with environmental safety. On 25 July of the same year 11 of the 22 suspects negotiated a sentence of 23 months' detention (but with suspended sentence) and a 7,000 euro fine for pollution, environmental disaster and illegal waste disposal, while the accusation of conspiracy was canceled. On 18 December 2019 the case was definitively closed with the dismissal of the positions of the remaining 11 suspects, which involved the managers of Fluorsid (including the president of Cagliari Calcio and of the company itself Tommaso Giulini) and its subsidiaries and managers of the Sardinian Healthcare Board (ATS) and of the Sardinian Environmental Defense Board (ARPAS). The plea deal, as well as the final setting of the accusation, confirmed the extraneousness of Fluorsid and its top management with respect to the conduct.

== Governance ==
Fluorsid consists of five subsidiaries that report directly to the original company established in 1969. In fact, they maintain organizational charts and legal entities, but are unified from a commercial and brand point of view, with their name preceded by that of the group, precisely Fluorsid. Management is led by the Fluorsid board of directors, to which the BoDs of the subsidiaries also refer. With regard to organizational reports, the plant managers of the subsidiaries report directly to Fluorsid's chief executive officer. The entire Fluorsid is part of the holding called Fluorsid Group, that has the full ownership of the professional football club Cagliari Calcio, the main sports club in Sardinia, and the minority shareholdings in other companies in several sectors.

=== Current structure ===
Company (percentuale detenuta)	Subsidiaries	Location	Sector	Industry
Fluorsid (100%)	FLUORSID	(Italy) Macchiareddu (Cagliari)	Chemical	Production of sulfuric acid, aluminum fluoride, synthetic cryolite, calcium fluoride and calcium sulfate.
Fluorsid (100%)	FLUORSID Noralf	(Norway) Odda	Chemical	Production of aluminum fluoride and calcium sulfate.
Fluorsid (100%)	FLUORSID ICIB	(Italy) Treviglio	Chemical	Production of hydrofluoric acid in solution and calcium sulphate.
Simplis Logistics (50%)		(Bahrain) Manama	Logistic	Logistics services.
Mimeta (100%)		(Switzerland) Lausanne	Metals	Trading activity.
Cagliari Calcio (100%)		(Italy) Assemini – Cagliari	Sport	Professional football club.
Laminazione sottile (30%)		(Italy) San Marco Evangelista	Metals	Production of aluminum laminates.
Farmagorà (26%)		(Italy) Bergamo	Pharmaceutical	Pharmacy group.
Torre Parko (20%)		(Italy) Saronno	Real Estate	Real estate services.

=== Former assets ===
Company	Location	Industry	Period
Alkeemia Spa	(Italy) Porto Marghera	Production of hydrofluoric acid and calcium sulphate.	2018–2021
CF Carbons(50%)	(Germany) Frankfurt	Production of chlorodifluoromethane (R22).	2021
