= Ottavio Morgia =

Italian footballer and manager (1920–1984)

Personal information
- Date of birth: 18 September 1920
- Place of birth: Rome, Italy
- Date of death: 30 August 1984 (aged 63)
- Position: Forward

Senior career*
Years	Team	Apps	(Gls)
1939–1940	Lazio		
1940–1943	Siracusa		
1943–1944	Avia		
1944–1946	Virtus Frattese		
1946–1947	Napoli		
1947	Viterbese		
1947–1948	Siena		
1948–1949	Avellino		
1949–1950	Napoli		
1950–1955	Cagliari		
1955–1957	Chinotto Neri		
1957–1958	FEDIT		

Managerial career
- 1954: Cagliari
- 1959–1960: Siena
- 1960–1963: Chieti
- * Club domestic league appearances and goals

Ottavio Morgia (18 September 1920 – 30 August 1984) was an Italian football forward and later manager.
