= Raffaele D'Aquino =

Italian footballer

Personal information
- Date of birth: 23 November 1903
- Place of birth: Trani, Italy
- Position: Midfielder

Senior career*
Years	Team	Apps	(Gls)
1924–1928	Novara	?	(14)
1928–1933	Roma	116	(1)
1933–1936	Pisa	63	(5)
1936–1937	Pontedera		
1939–1940	Grosseto	6	(0)

Managerial career
- 1946–1948: Cagliari
- * Club domestic league appearances and goals

Raffaele D'Aquino (born 23 November 1903 in Trani) was an Italian professional football player.

He played for 4 seasons (87 games, no goals) in the Serie A for A.S. Roma.
