= Massimo Ficcadenti =

Italian football player and manager (born 1967)

Personal information
- Full name: Massimo Ficcadenti
- Date of birth: 6 November 1967 (age 58)
- Place of birth: Fermo, Italy
- Height: 1.81 m (5 ft 11 in)
- Position: Midfielder

Senior career*
Years	Team	Apps	(Gls)
1985–1989	Sambenedettese	68	(2)
1989–1992	Messina	90	(5)
1992–1997	Verona	132	(9)
1997–2000	Torino	48	(2)
2000–2001	Ravenna	2	(0)

Managerial career
- 2001–2002: Fiorenzuola
- 2002: Avellino
- 2003–2004: Pistoiese
- 2004–2006: Verona
- 2007: Reggina
- 2009–2010: Piacenza
- 2010–2011: Cesena
- 2011: Cagliari
- 2012: Cagliari
- 2014–2015: FC Tokyo
- 2016–2018: Sagan Tosu
- 2019–2021: Nagoya Grampus
- * Club domestic league appearances and goals

Massimo Ficcadenti (born 6 November 1967) is an Italian football manager and former player who played as a midfielder.

== Playing career ==
Ficcadenti was born in Fermo. He started his playing career with Sambenedettese, where he played from 1985 to 1989. He then signed for Messina, playing for the Sicilian side for a total of three seasons before to join Verona in 1992. At Verona, he also had the opportunity to make his Serie A debut; he stayed with the gialloblu for a total of five seasons before moving at Torino in 1997. He left Torino for Ravenna in 2000, and retired from active football one year later to become a coach.

== Coaching career ==
Ficcadenti's first coaching experience came in 2001 as boss of Serie C2 team Fiorenzuola. Ficcadenti, at the helm of a club under serious financial struggles, ended the regular season in 17th place, but later lost the relegation play-offs to Trento. Despite the Serie D relegation, his work at Fiorenzuola was praised by a number of pundits, given the circumstances, and he was successively appointed by Avellino of Serie C1, being however fired before the beginning of the season due to poor performances in the Coppa Italia Serie C and a number of friendly matches. In June 2003, he was then appointed as head coach of Pistoiese, another Serie C1 team. As well as in Fiorenzuola, Ficcadenti found a club under financial troubles, and a squad mainly composed by young and loaned players, the one with the lowest age in all the professional leagues that year; despite that, Pistoiese narrowly missed a spot in the Serie B promotion play-offs, and ended in a good 11th place.

Pistoiese's performances convinced Serie B club Verona to offer him their head coaching position in 2004. In his first year with Verona, Ficcadenti ended in a mid-table place, after having been involved in the promotion fight for the first half of the season. The 2005–06 season, with a weaker team that lost some of their more notable players, saw Verona struggling in the relegation battle, but saving themselves from a Serie C1 fall in the end. The following season proved to be much harder for Ficcadenti, as the club lost several key players such as Mattia Cassani and striker Adaílton. Ficcadenti was then sacked in December 2006 because of poor results, being replaced by Giampiero Ventura who however did not manage to save the club from relegation.

On 23 June 2007, several news announced Reggina's appointment of Ficcadenti as new head coach, despite the fact he was still contracted with his previous club Verona. However Verona did not give Ficcadenti permission to make the move, and on 27 June, the club announced on their website to have reappointed him as their head coach for the upcoming 2007–08 Serie C1 campaign. The issue finally came to an end on 1 July, when Ficcadenti rescinded his contract with Verona and Reggina announced on their website to have appointed him as coach. He however made a very poor start with Reggina, failing to achieve a single win in the first ten matchdays; a shock 3–1 home loss to Livorno, who was three points behind the amaranto before the match kick-off, convinced Reggina chairman Lillo Foti to sack Ficcadenti on 1 November 2007.

In February 2009, Ficcadenti returned to Hellas Verona, serving as transfer market consultant to new club owner and chairman Giovanni Martinelli.

In November 2009, he returned into management, being appointed head coach of Serie B side Piacenza as a replacement for dismissed trainer Fabrizio Castori.

In June 2010, Ficcadenti signed for newly promoted Serie A club Cesena. After a hugely successful season which culminated with Cesena achieving 15th place in Serie A, 7 points clear of relegation, it was decided by mutual consent not to renew Ficcadenti's contract, thereby making him a free agent as of May 2011.

On 16 August 2011 he was introduced as new head coach of Serie A club Cagliari, taking over from dismissed predecessor Roberto Donadoni. On 8 November 2011 he was sacked following a winless run in their past five matches in the season. On 11 March 2012, after sacking Davide Ballardini, Cagliari Calcio recalled him to coach the team, struggling for remaining in Serie A. He left the club by mutual consent on 2 October 2012 after a dismal start to the new season that left Cagliari bottom-placed in the league table.

In January 2014, he began an overseas career at FC Tokyo replacing Ranko Popovic. His two-years tenure ended in November 2015, after the team finished the J1 League at the 4th place, which meant they missed the right to participate in both J1 final championships, and the AFC Champions League 2016 playoff match.

In 2016 season, he got a new job as manager of Sagan Tosu, and served until October 2018.

In the fall of 2019 Ficcadenti replaced Yahiro Kazama as manager of Nagoya Grampus.

== Managerial statistics ==
As of 4 December 2021

Team	From	To	Record				
Team	From	To	G	W	D	L	Win %
Pistoiese	2003	2004	34	11	11	12	32.35
Hellas Verona	2004	2006	109	30	40	39	27.52
Reggina	2007	2007	11	1	5	5	9.09
Piacenza	2009	2010	28	11	11	6	39.29
Cesena	2010	2011	39	11	10	18	28.21
Cagliari Calcio	2011	2011	11	4	4	3	36.36
Cagliari Calcio	2012	2012	18	4	5	9	22.22
FC Tokyo	2014	2015	87	39	23	25	44.83
Sagan Tosu	2016	2018	122	40	34	48	32.79
Nagoya Grampus	2019	2021	97	53	20	24	54.64
Total			556	204	163	189	36.69

== Honours ==
Nagoya Grampus

- J.League Cup: 2021
