= Marco Giampaolo =

Italian football manager (born 1967)

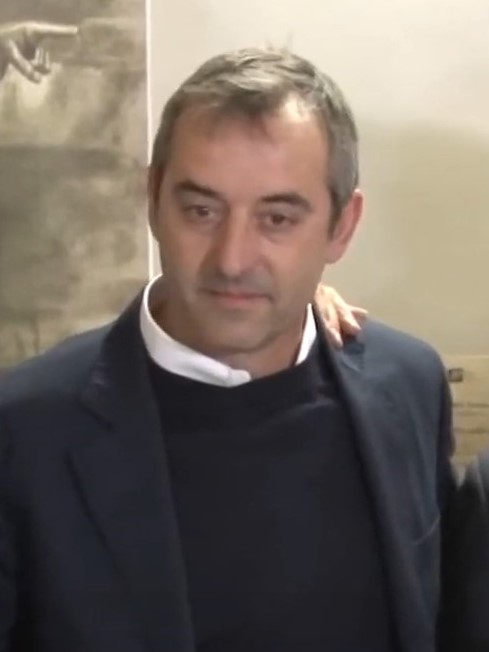
- Giampaolo in 2018

Personal information
- Full name: Marco Giampaolo
- Date of birth: 2 August 1967 (age 59)
- Place of birth: Bellinzona, Switzerland
- Position: Midfielder

Team information
- Current team: Cremonese (head coach)

Senior career*
Years	Team	Apps	(Gls)
1986–1990	Giulianova		
1990–1992	Gubbio		
1992–1993	Licata		
1993–1995	Siracusa		
1995–1996	Fidelis Andria		
1996–1997	Gualdo		

Managerial career
- 2000–2001: Pescara (assistant)
- 2001–2002: Giulianova (assistant)
- 2002–2004: Treviso (assistant)
- 2004–2005: Ascoli
- 2006: Cagliari
- 2007: Cagliari
- 2008–2009: Siena
- 2010–2011: Catania
- 2011: Cesena
- 2013: Brescia
- 2014–2015: Cremonese
- 2015–2016: Empoli
- 2016–2019: Sampdoria
- 2019: Milan
- 2020–2021: Torino
- 2022: Sampdoria
- 2024–2025: Lecce
- 2026: Cremonese
- * Club domestic league appearances and goals

Marco Giampaolo (Italian pronunciation: [ˈmarko dʒamˈpaːolo]; born 2 August 1967) is an Italian football manager and former professional player who played as a midfielder. He was most recently the head coach of Serie B club Cremonese.

== Playing career ==
Although born in Bellinzona, Switzerland, Giampaolo grew up in Giulianova, from where his family originates. He has a brother, Federico Giampaolo, who is a former striker. During his playing career, he was a midfielder who played for several Serie C teams, including Giulianova, Gubbio, Licata and Siracusa, before making his Serie B debut for Fidelis Andria in 1995. He retired in 1997, after a season played with Gualdo, following an ankle injury.

== Managerial career ==
After his retirement, Giampaolo was signed as scout for Serie B side Pescara, and successively promoted as assistant coach in 2000. In 2001, he was appointed assistant coach of Serie C1 side Giulianova, in support of Adriano Buffoni. Both left in April 2002, despite the team was fully involved in a fight for a playoff placement, citing bad relationships with the club's management. In 2002–03, both Buffoni and Giampaolo signed for Treviso of Serie C1, leading the team to an immediate promotion to Serie B and saving the team from relegation the following season.

In 2004–05, Giampaolo moved to Ascoli, where he again acted as assistant coach of unknown manager Massimo Silva. This was often cited as a trick in order to allow Giampaolo to coach the team, as he was not in possess of a valid coaching licence at the time. The season ended in a good sixth place, which allowed Ascoli to play promotion playoffs, where it was defeated by Torino Calcio. However, following a serie of cancellations by the federation, Ascoli was admitted to play Serie A the next season, and both Giampaolo and Silva were confirmed to coach a team built in only two weeks, with the only goal to maintain a place in Italian top division. In February 2006, Giampaolo was disqualified for two months by the Italian Football Federation for having acted as first team head coach without a valid coaching licence. Successively, Giampaolo was admitted to join the Coverciano coaching course, and, after having saved Ascoli from relegation, he was announced as coach of Cagliari.

In September 2006, Marco Giampaolo was involved in a freak training ground accident, the 39-year-old boss was hit on the head by a wayward ball and, despite continuing with the training session, developed symptoms of concussion soon after. The coach was taken to hospital as a precautionary measure.

On 17 December 2006, after a 3–1 away defeat to Udinese in a league match, Cagliari boss Massimo Cellino announced to have sacked Giampaolo, citing coach's loss of confidence with the team. However, on 26 February 2007 Cellino decided to sack Franco Colomba and reinstate Giampaolo back at the Cagliari head coach position. After having led Cagliari to avoid relegation, he was confirmed for the 2007–08, but he was sacked again on 13 November and replaced by Nedo Sonetti, leaving the rossoblu in last place with nine points (but with one match less than other teams). He was later called once again to return at the helm of the rossoblu, following the dismissal of Sonetti, but he ultimately rejected the offer, citing his unwillingness to do so. He successively rescinded his contract with Cagliari, and in June 2008 was announced head coach of Siena for the 2008–09 season, who was dismissed on 29 October 2009.

On 30 May 2010, Giampaolo was appointed to replace Siniša Mihajlović as head coach of Catania. After an unimpressive first half of season, Giampaolo and Catania parted company on 18 January 2011.

On 4 June 2011, Cesena announced that he will be appointed head coach, replacing Massimo Ficcadenti who left the club by mutual consent despite keeping the club in Serie A.

On 30 October 2011, he was sacked because of bad results, leaving Cesena at bottom of Serie A table with just 3 points.

In July 2013 he was named new head coach of Serie B club Brescia. He left Brescia by mutual consent on 25 September 2013 after having stated his intention to quit the club following a heated home loss to Crotone and Giampaolo's disappearance for three days (which also led to assistant coach Fabio Micarelli and technical consultant Luigi Maifredi fulfilling his role for a single league game against Carpi) after confronting with the club supporters.

On 9 June 2015, it was announced that Giampaolo was named new coach of Empoli. On 4 July 2016, he became the new manager of Sampdoria on a two-year contract, succeeding Vincenzo Montella. After the 2018–19 season, Giampaolo terminated his contract with Sampdoria.

On 19 June 2019, Giampaolo signed with Serie A club Milan a contract until 2021, with an optional one-year extension. He was sacked on 8 October 2019, after seven matches in charge with three wins and four defeats.

On 7 August 2020, Giampaolo signed a two-year contract to become the head coach at Torino. On 18 January 2021, Giampaolo was sacked.

On 19 January 2022, he was re-appointed as head coach of Sampdoria. He was dismissed on 2 October 2022 after a 3–0 home loss to Monza, leaving Sampdoria in last place in the 2022–23 Serie A league table.

On 11 November 2024, he was appointed as head coach of Lecce.

== Managerial statistics ==
As of match played 1 September 2026

Managerial record by team and tenure
Team	From	To	Record							
Team	From	To	G	W	D	L	GF	GA	GD	Win %
Ascoli	14 June 2004	20 June 2005	47	18	12	17	55	58	−3	38.30
Cagliari	13 June 2006	19 December 2006	19	4	10	5	17	19	−2	21.05
Cagliari	26 February 2007	13 November 2007	26	8	5	13	29	37	−8	30.77
Siena	27 May 2008	29 October 2009	50	14	10	26	45	61	−16	28.00
Catania	30 May 2010	18 January 2011	23	7	7	9	27	31	−4	30.43
Cesena	4 June 2011	30 October 2011	10	1	3	6	4	12	−8	10.00
Brescia	2 July 2013	23 September 2013	7	2	3	2	9	8	+1	28.57
Cremonese	17 November 2014	15 June 2015	26	9	10	7	33	30	+3	34.62
Empoli	15 June 2015	26 May 2016	39	12	10	17	40	50	−10	30.77
Sampdoria	4 July 2016	15 June 2019	123	49	26	48	183	177	+6	39.84
Milan	19 June 2019	8 October 2019	7	3	0	4	6	9	−3	42.86
Torino	7 August 2020	18 January 2021	21	4	8	9	31	36	−5	19.05
Sampdoria	19 January 2022	2 October 2022	25	6	3	16	22	39	−17	24.00
Lecce	11 November 2024	10 June 2025	26	6	7	13	22	37	−15	23.08
Cremonese	18 March 2026	1 September 2026	13	5	1	7	13	17	−4	38.46
Career total			462	148	115	199	536	621	−85	32.03
