= Birra Ichnusa =

Brand of beer from Sardinia, Italy

Coordinates: 39.2143138°N 8.9862801°E

- Interactive map of Birra Ichnusa
- Location: Assemini, Metropolitan City of Cagliari, Sardinia
- Opened: 1912, Cagliari
- Owner: Heineken International

Active beers
Name	Type
Ichnusa	Lager

Birra Ichnusa, or simply Ichnusa, is a brand of Sardinian-made beer, which is brewed in Assemini, a town near the Sardinian capital Cagliari.

== History ==
It is named after the Latinized ancient name taken from Ancient Greek Ikhnoûssa (Ἰχνοῦσσα).

Birra Ichnusa is a lager (4.7% ABV) with a hoppy taste.

Founded in 1912, Birra Ichnusa Special is a lager with 5.6% and Ichnusa Cruda a non pasteurized lager with 4.9% alc. Serving temperatures for all of them is 3 °C. A Zwickel-style, unfiltered, 'Ichnusa Non Filtrata' (5.0% ABV) is also available.

Birra Ichnusa was founded in Cagliari in 1912. In 1967 the brewery was finally moved to Assemini. In 1981 more than 400,000 hl beer was brewed. Since 1986 Birra Ichnusa is owned by Heineken.

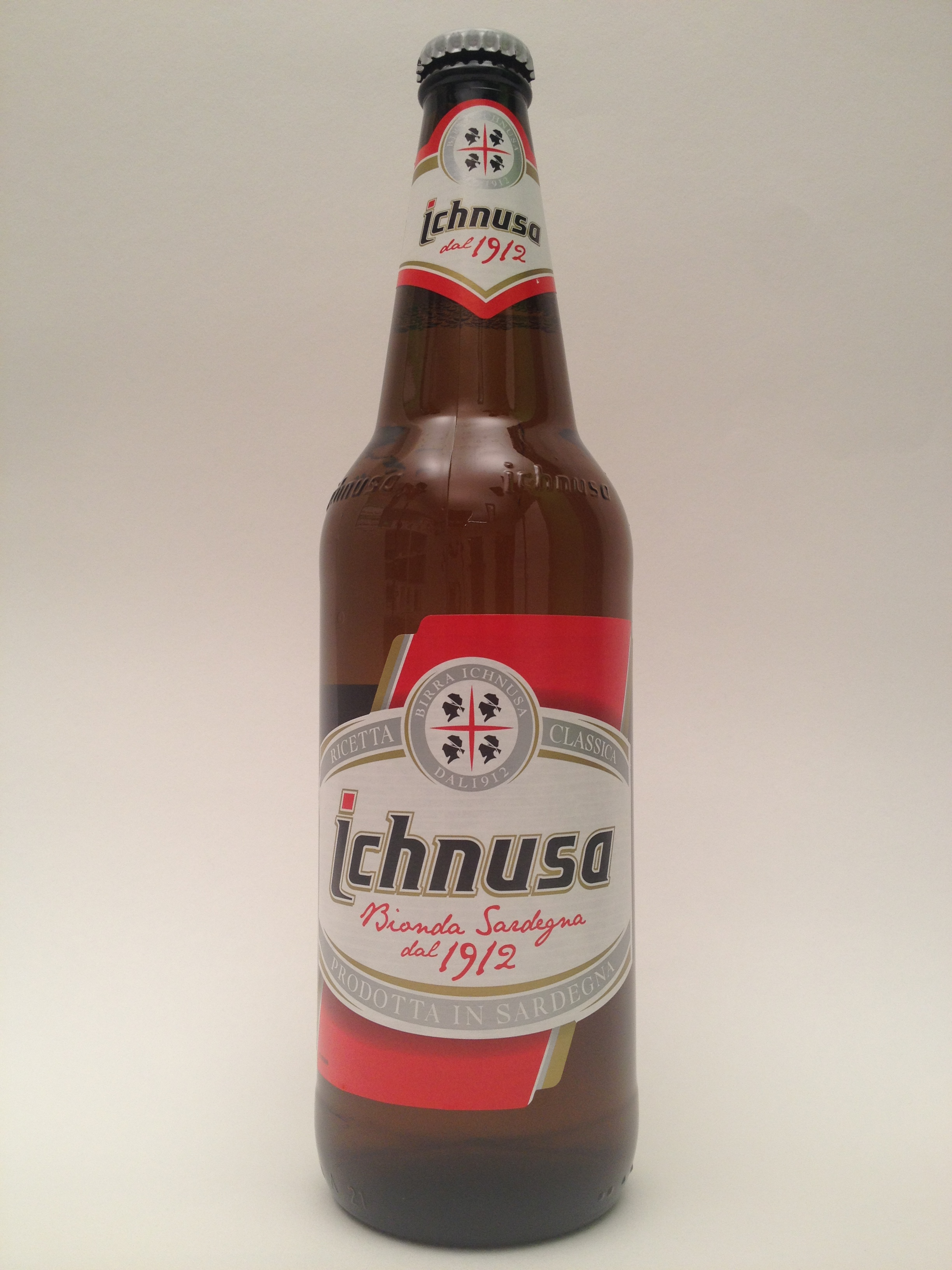
Birra Ichnusa

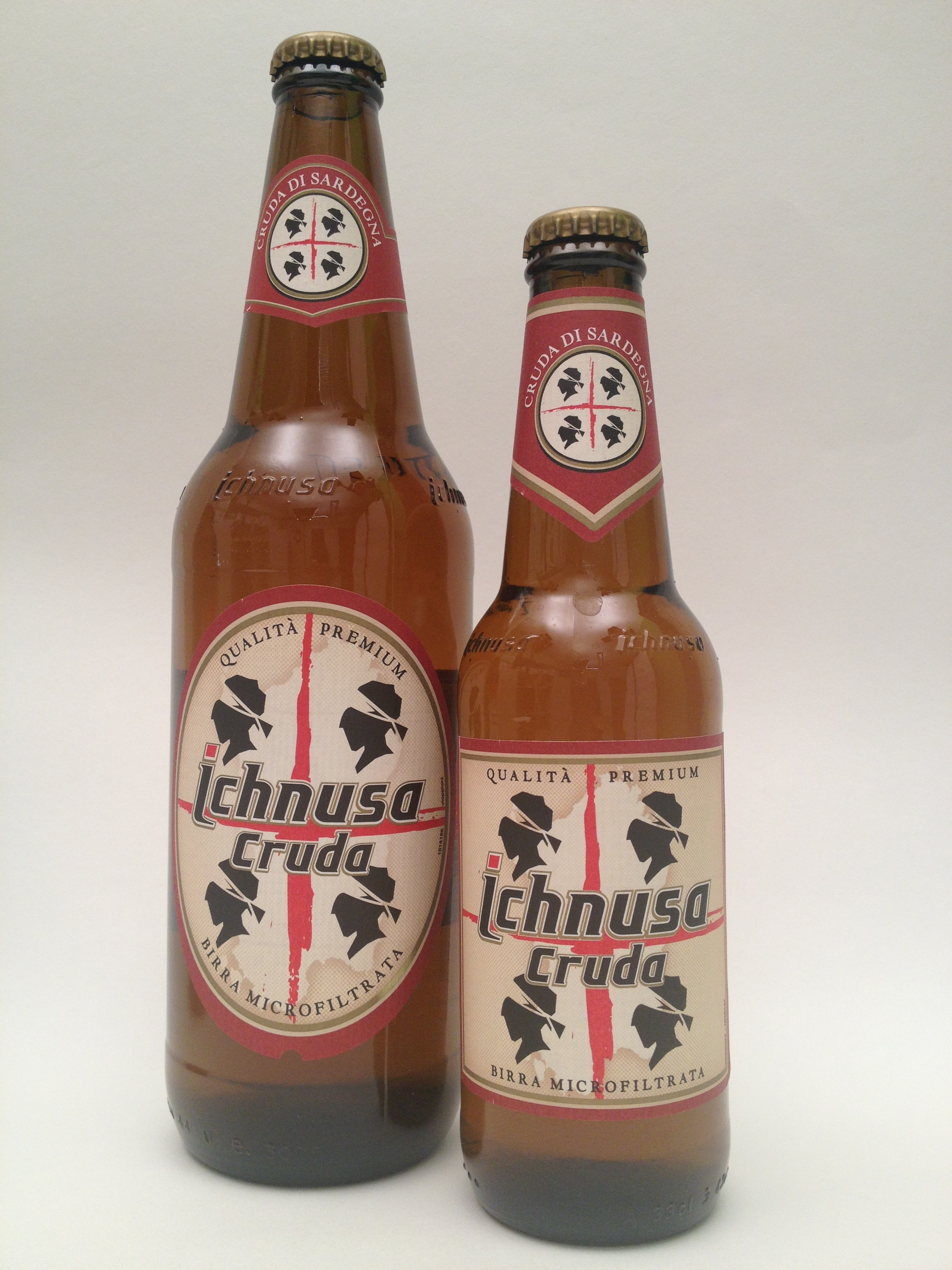
Ichnusa Cruda

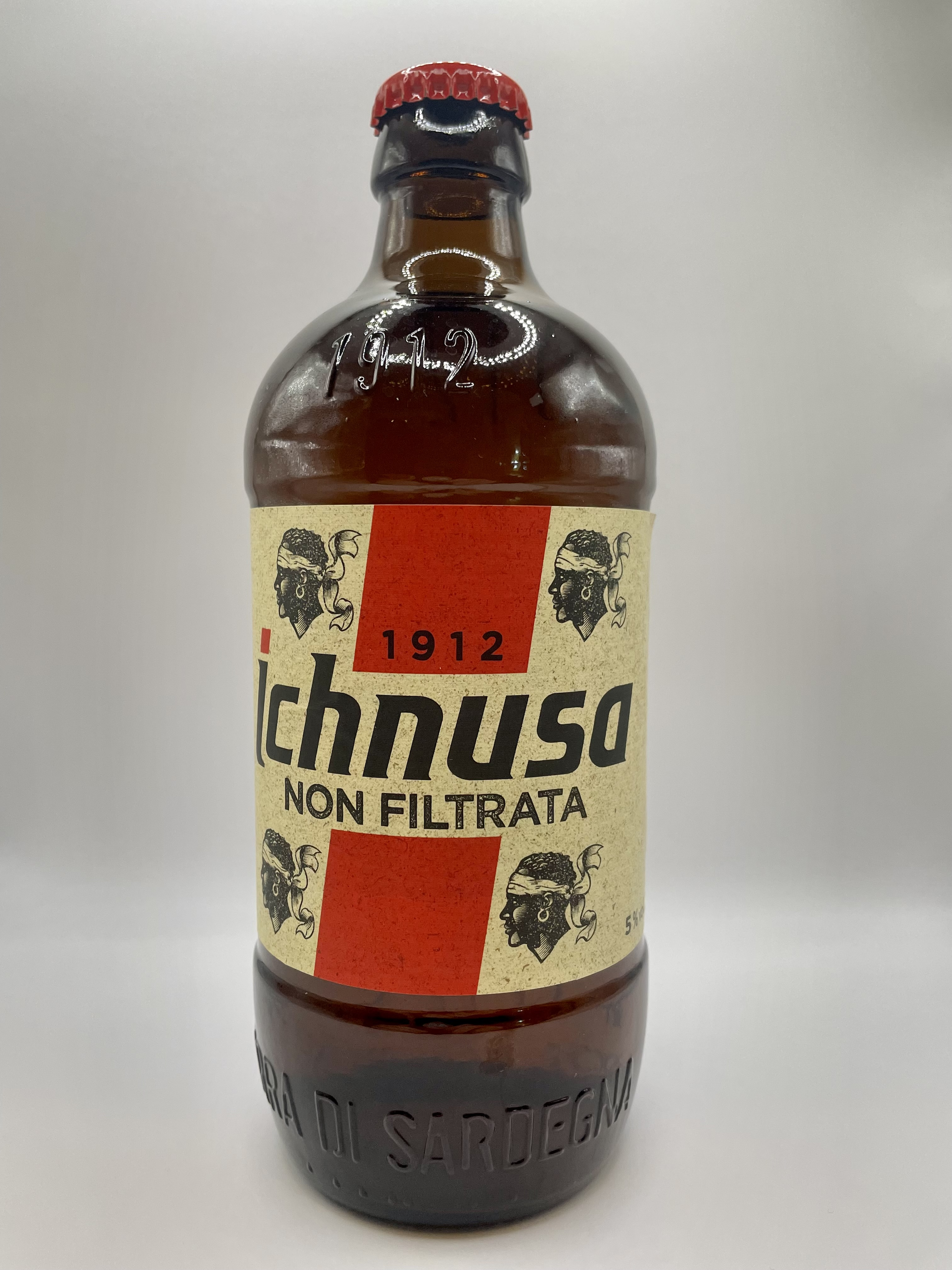
Ichnusa Non Filtrata
