= Davide Ballardini =

Italian football manager (born 1964)

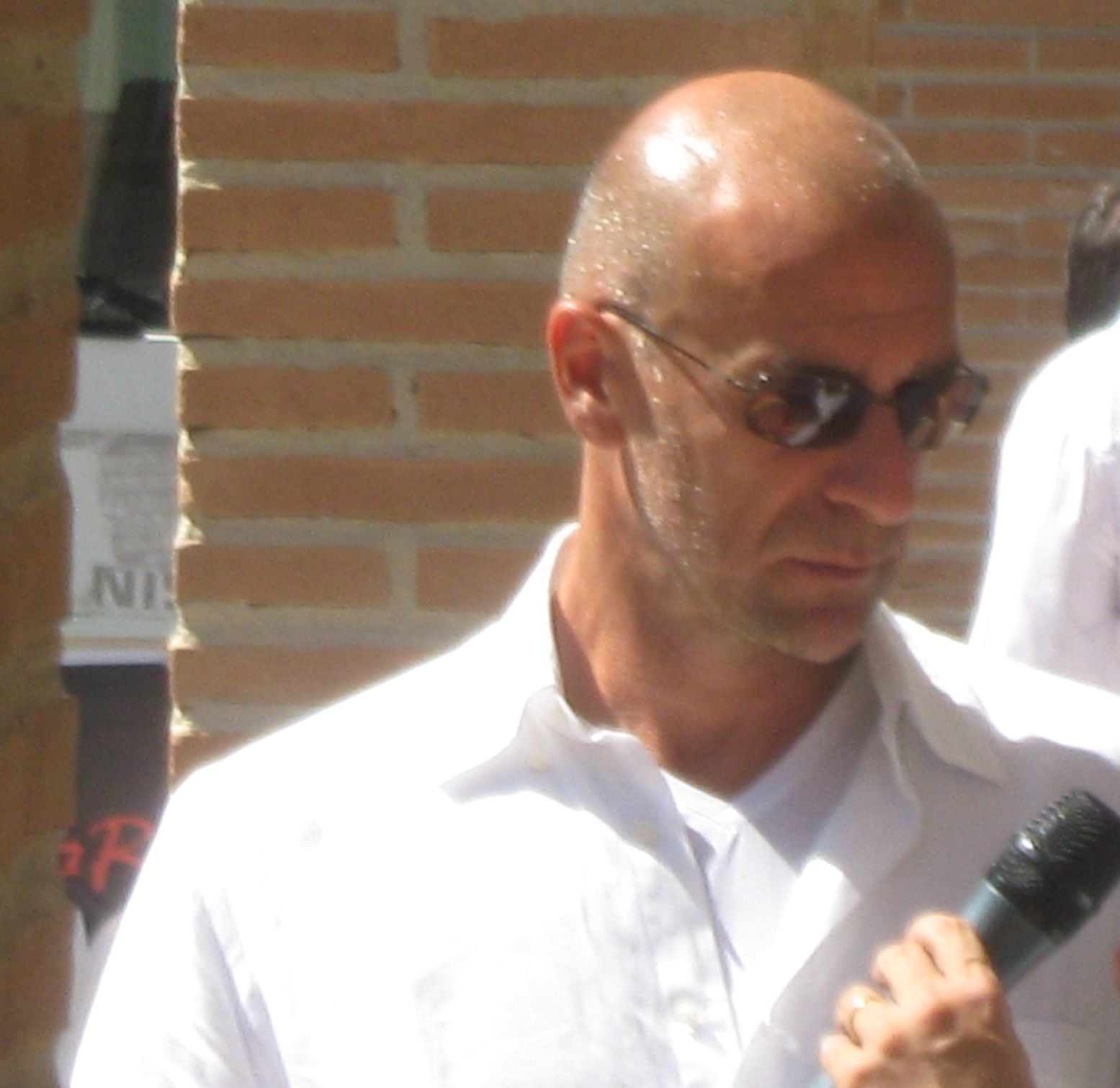
- Ballardini as Lazio manager in 2009

Personal information
- Full name: Davide Ballardini
- Date of birth: 6 January 1964 (age 62)
- Place of birth: Ravenna, Italy
- Height: 1.80 m (5 ft 11 in)
- Position: Midfielder

Youth career
- 1978–1982: Cesena

Senior career*
Years	Team	Apps	(Gls)
1982–1984	Cesena		
1984–1985	Faenza		

Managerial career
- 2004–2005: Sambenedettese
- 2005: Cagliari
- 2006: Pescara
- 2007–2008: Cagliari
- 2008–2009: Palermo
- 2009–2010: Lazio
- 2010–2011: Genoa
- 2011–2012: Cagliari
- 2013: Genoa
- 2014: Bologna
- 2015–2016: Palermo
- 2016: Palermo
- 2017–2018: Genoa
- 2020–2021: Genoa
- 2023: Cremonese
- 2024: Sassuolo
- 2026: Avellino
- * Club domestic league appearances and goals

Davide Ballardini (born 6 January 1964) is an Italian football manager. He was most recently the head coach of Serie B club Avellino.

== Playing career ==
A former midfielder, Ballardini spent seven years as a player with Cesena under youth team coach Arrigo Sacchi and first-team coach Osvaldo Bagnoli, which he cited as his mentors.

== Coaching career ==
Ballardini started his coaching career serving as youth team coach for Bologna, and successively Cesena and A.C. Milan. He then worked as Parma under-19 youth team coach from 2002 to 2004. He was then appointed by Sambenedettese as new head coach for the 2004–05 season, ended with an impressive fourth place and the consequent participation in the promotion playoffs, then lost to Napoli in the semi-final. He was subsequently chosen by Massimo Cellino as the new Cagliari boss for their 2005–06 Serie A campaign; however, he was sacked only a few weeks later, on 11 November, and replaced by Nedo Sonetti.

Ballardini started the 2006–07 season at the helm of Serie B side Pescara, where he lasted only until October, following a very unimpressive beginning in the league. He was surprisingly announced as the new boss of last-placed Serie A team Cagliari on 27 December 2007, succeeding Sonetti, who ironically replaced him during his first period at the helm of the Sardinian side. Under his tenure as head coach, Cagliari dramatically improved their results, winning 32 points in 21 weeks, thus rising up the table and managing to escape relegation in advance of a week. However, Ballardini failed to find an agreement with Cagliari chairman Massimo Cellino for a contract extension, and they ultimately decided to part company on 28 May.

On 4 September 2008, Palermo announced they had dismissed head coach Stefano Colantuono, appointing Ballardini as the new Rosanero boss in a one-year contract. In his debut match with Palermo, Ballardini led the Sicilians to a very impressive 3–1 home win to Roma, and then went on to impose the first seasonal loss to Juventus, winning 2–1 in Turin, this being the first time Palermo won at Juventus' home in 47 years. His ability to recover Palermo, leading them to the top league positions, was quickly praised again by the media. On 7 October, just two days after the Rosanero triumph in Turin, Palermo announced to have agreed a two-year contract extension with Ballardini.

After weeks of rumours regarding a possible departure of Ballardini from Palermo at the end of the season, on 30 May the Rosanero head coach announced he had agreed for 10 days to give a definite answer to the club regarding his intentions. Later that day, Palermo chairman Maurizio Zamparini announced Ballardini had asked to be relieved from his position due to his unwillingness to keep on serving as Palermo's head coach. A few days later, on 5 June, Palermo unveiled Walter Zenga as new head coach, thus ending speculation regarding Ballardini's future with the Rosanero. Despite being dismissed as head coach following these events, Ballardini was still under a contract for two more years with the Sicilian club.

Finally, after long rumours connecting Ballardini's name as the next coach of Lazio following Delio Rossi's departure, he was appointed as the new manager of the Roman club on 15 June 2009. He signed a two-year contract with an option for a third worth €750,000 yearly.

On his first competitive match as Lazio boss, Ballardini led the club to triumph in the 2009 Supercoppa Italiana, as his side won 2–1 to outgoing Italian champions Internazionale in a single-legged game played at Beijing National Stadium in China. However, Ballardini did not repeat this triumph at Serie A level and failed to qualify for the 2009–10 UEFA Europa League knockout round. Later, in January and February, several disappointing results left Lazio in 18th place and in danger of being relegated, leading club chairman Claudio Lotito to dismiss Ballardini and appoint Edy Reja as new head coach.

On 8 November 2010, Ballardini returned to management, accepting an offer as head coach of Serie A club Genoa. He signed a two-year contract with the club, but club president Enrico Preziosi terminated the contract with him for no particular reason on 5 June 2011.

On 9 November 2011, Ballardini returned to manage Cagliari for the third time in his career. He was dismissed for just cause on 11 March 2012.

On 21 January 2013, Ballardini returned to Genoa to try to save them from relegation. He has managed to do so with still one game to go. Nevertheless, chairman Preziosi may decide yet again to let him go at the end of the season. Many Genoa supporters respected Ballardini for his manners and energy on the pitch.

On 8 January 2014, Serie A club Bologna announced that Ballardini agreed on a six-month deal to coach their first team.

On 10 November 2015, he became the manager of Palermo. He was later relieved of his duties on 11 January 2016, one day after having been publicly accused of unprofessionalism by team captain Stefano Sorrentino in the wake of a 1–0 away win at Verona.

On 12 April 2016, he was rehired as coach of Palermo after the sacking of Walter Novellino, the ninth managerial change for the club during the 2015–16 season.

On 21 December 2020, Ballardini was appointed manager of Genoa, beginning his fourth spell with the club. He was sacked on 6 November 2021, due to negative results in the 2021–22 Serie A season.

On 15 January 2023, Ballardini returned to management as the new head coach of bottom-placed Serie A club Cremonese, signing a contract until 30 June 2024. Despite suffering relegation to Serie B by the end of the season, Ballardini was confirmed in charge of the Grigiorossi for the 2023–24 season but was eventually dismissed on 18 September 2023 after an unimpressive start in the league, with just one win in the first five games.

On 1 March 2024, Ballardini was hired by relegation-battling Serie A club Sassuolo as their new head coach until the end of the season.

On 18 February 2026, he was hired as head coach of Avellino in Serie B.

== Personal life ==
Ballardini was born in Ravenna. He has three sons with his Swedish wife, all of them being footballers: Leo Natale (born 1990) played in the role of striker for Igea Virtus and Elia (born 1991, striker) for Virtus Entella, whereas Erik (born 1995, midfielder) is currently part of Cesena's youth ranks.

== Managerial statistics ==
As of match played 26 May 2024

Managerial record by team and tenure
Team	Nat.	From	To	Record							
Team	Nat.	From	To	G	W	D	L	GF	GA	GD	Win %
Sambenedettese	(Italy)	1 September 2004	7 June 2005	40	14	14	12	44	35	+9	35.00
Cagliari	(Italy)	16 September 2005	8 November 2005	9	0	4	5	5	14	−9	0.00
Pescara	(Italy)	1 July 2006	9 October 2006	8	1	2	5	8	12	−4	12.50
Cagliari	(Italy)	27 December 2007	27 May 2008	22	9	5	8	27	27	+0	40.91
Palermo	(Italy)	4 September 2008	5 June 2009	37	17	6	14	56	47	+9	45.95
Lazio	(Italy)	15 June 2009	10 February 2010	34	9	10	15	35	39	−4	26.47
Genoa	(Italy)	8 November 2010	5 June 2011	30	12	7	11	42	40	+2	40.00
Cagliari	(Italy)	9 November 2011	11 March 2012	18	4	6	8	18	27	−9	22.22
Genoa	(Italy)	21 January 2013	6 June 2013	17	4	9	4	17	18	−1	23.53
Bologna	(Italy)	8 January 2014	1 July 2014	20	2	8	10	11	25	−14	10.00
Palermo	(Italy)	10 November 2015	11 January 2016	8	2	1	5	9	16	−7	25.00
Palermo	(Italy)	12 April 2016	5 September 2016	9	4	3	2	11	10	+1	44.44
Genoa	(Italy)	6 November 2017	9 October 2018	36	16	5	15	40	40	+0	44.44
Genoa	(Italy)	21 December 2020	5 November 2021	39	11	14	14	57	61	−4	28.21
Cremonese	(Italy)	15 January 2023	18 September 2023	30	8	10	12	34	47	−13	26.67
Sassuolo	(Italy)	1 March 2024	31 May 2024	12	2	4	6	11	21	−10	16.67
Total				368	114	108	146	425	479	−54	30.98

== Honours ==
=== As manager ===
Lazio

- Supercoppa Italiana: 2009
