= 2008–09 Serie B =

Italian football league season

Serie B TIM
- Season: 2008–09
- Champions: Bari (2nd title)
- Promoted: Bari; Parma; Livorno (by Play-off)
- Relegated: Treviso (bankruptcy); Avellino (bankruptcy); Pisa (bankruptcy); Rimini (by Play-out)
- Matches: 462
- Goals: 1,103 (2.39 per match)
- Top goalscorer: (Italy) Francesco Tavano (24 goals)

The 2008–09 Serie B season was the seventy-seventh since its establishment. A total of 22 teams will contest the league, 15 of which will be returning from the 2007–08 season, four of which will have been promoted from Serie C1 (now Lega Pro Prima Divisione), and three relegated from Serie A.

== Teams ==
Geographical distribution of Serie B teams for season 2008–09

Noted teams featured in the league include Parma F.C., who last played Serie B in 1989–90 when under coach Nevio Scala they won their first promotion to the top flight.

U.S. Sassuolo Calcio, promoted to Serie B as Serie C1/A champions, are competing at the highest level in the club's history. A vacancy created by the withdrawal of Sicilian squad F.C. Messina Peloro was filled by the federation by including U.S. Avellino, who were the best team slated to be relegated in 2007–08.

=== Stadiums and locations ===
Club	City	Stadium	Capacity	2007–08 season
AlbinoLeffe	Albino and Leffe (playing in Bergamo)	Stadio Atleti Azzurri d'Italia	26,393	4th in Serie B
Ancona	Ancona	Stadio del Conero	26,000	Serie C1/B Play-off Winners
Ascoli	Ascoli Piceno	Stadio Cino e Lillo Del Duca	20,000	8th in Serie B
Avellino	Avellino	Stadio Partenio	26,308	19th in Serie B
Bari	Bari	Stadio San Nicola	58,248	11th in Serie B
Brescia	Brescia	Stadio Mario Rigamonti	27,547	5th in Serie B
Cittadella	Cittadella	Stadio Pier Cesare Tombolato	7,623	Serie C1/A Play-off Winners
Empoli	Empoli	Stadio Carlo Castellani	19,795	18th in Serie A
Frosinone	Frosinone	Stadio Matusa	9,680	10th in Serie B
Grosseto	Grosseto	Stadio Olimpico Carlo Zecchini	8,350	13th in Serie B
Livorno	Livorno	Stadio Armando Picchi	19,238	20th in Serie A
Mantova	Mantova	Stadio Danilo Martelli	14,844	9th in Serie B
Modena	Modena	Stadio Alberto Braglia	20,507	16th in Serie B
Parma	Parma	Stadio Ennio Tardini	27,906	19th in Serie A
Piacenza	Piacenza	Stadio Leonardo Garilli	21,668	15th in Serie B
Pisa	Pisa	Arena Garibaldi - Stadio Romeo Anconetani	17,000	6th in Serie B
Rimini	Rimini	Stadio Romeo Neri	9,768	7th in Serie B
Salernitana	Salerno	Stadio Arechi	37,245	Serie C1/B Champions
Sassuolo	Sassuolo (playing in Modena)	Stadio Alberto Braglia	20,507	Serie C1/A Champions
Treviso	Treviso	Stadio Omobono Tenni	9,996	18th in Serie B
Triestina	Trieste	Stadio Nereo Rocco	32,454	12th in Serie B
Vicenza	Vicenza	Stadio Romeo Menti	17,163	17th in Serie B

=== Personnel and kits ===
Team	President	Manager	Kit manufacturer	Shirt sponsor
AlbinoLeffe	(Italy) Gianfranco Andreoletti	(Italy) Armando Madonna	Acerbis	UBI Banca Popolare di Bergamo (H)/UBI Assicurazioni (A), Studio Casa Agenzie Immobiliari
Ancona	(Italy) Giorgio Perrotti	(Italy) Sandro Salvioni	Legea	Kerself/Elitaria/University.it/Twice/H6
Ascoli	(Italy) Roberto Benigni	(Italy) Franco Colomba	Legea	Carisap, Fainplast
Avellino	(Italy) Massimo Pugliese	(Italy) Salvatore Campilongo	Legea	Sidigas
Bari	(Italy) Vincenzo Matarrese	(Italy) Antonio Conte	Erreà	Gaudianello, Radionorba
Brescia	(Italy) Gino Corioni	(Italy) Alberto Cavasin	Asics	UBI Banco di Brescia, Bregoli SpA
Cittadella	(Italy) Andrea Gabrielli	(Italy) Claudio Foscarini	Garman	Siderurgica Gabrielli
Empoli	(Italy) Fabrizio Corsi	(Italy) Silvio Baldini	Asics	Limonta Sport, Computer Gross
Frosinone	(Italy) Maurizio Stirpe	(Italy) Piero Braglia	Legea	Banca Popolare del Frusinate, Provincia di Frosinone
Grosseto	(Italy) Piero Camilli	(Italy) Elio Gustinetti	Erreà	Industria Lavorazione Carni Ovine, Banca della Maremma
Livorno	(Italy) Aldo Spinelli	(Italy) Leonardo Acori	Legea	Banca Carige, Pediatrica
Mantova	(Italy) Fabrizio Lori	(Italy) Mario Somma	Diadora	Nuova Pansac
Modena	(Italy) Alfredo Amadei	(Italy) Luigi Apolloni	Erreà	Immergas, Kerakoll
Parma	(Italy) Tommaso Ghirardi	(Italy) Francesco Guidolin	Erreà	Banca Monte Parma, Metella Trasporti & Logistica
Piacenza	(Italy) Fabrizio Garilli	(Italy) Stefano Pioli	Macron	UNICEF
Pisa	(Italy) Luca Pomponi	(Italy) Bruno Giordano	Joma	Limonta Sport/Abitalia, Abitalia/Nettaro
Rimini	(Italy) Luca Benedettini	(Italy) Guido Carboni	Macron	Banca di Rimini/B&H Hotels, Sayerlack
Salernitana	(Italy) Antonio Lombardi	(Italy) Fabio Brini	Umbro	Interauto Citroën/VIT Cartiera Confalone, Santagata
Sassuolo	(Italy) Carlo Rossi	(Italy) Andrea Mandorlini	Sportika	Mapei
Treviso	(Italy) Ettore Setten	(Italy) Luca Gotti	Lotto	Grigolin/Banca Treviso
Triestina	(Italy) Stefano Fantinel	(Italy) Rolando Maran	Mass	Bossini, Fantinel
Vicenza	(Italy) (Egypt) Sergio Cassingena	(Italy) Angelo Gregucci	Diadora	Fieri di Vicenza/La Felinese/Choice/Caffè Vero/Diadora/PerFormare/Burro De Paoli/Estel/Luxin Italia/Pulitalia/Vicenzaoro First/BRPneumatici/Vicenzaoro Charm/Helyos

== Events ==
Following the end of the 2007–08 season, rumours spread out regarding Messina's financial struggles which might lead the team to insolvency and following exclusion from the Serie B teamlist. This was implicitly confirmed by the fact that Messina has not organized a pre-season camp as of 10 July, and the team being still without a coach. On 14 July 2008 the club board announced their intention to resign from the Serie B due to financial difficulties, also stating their intention to start again from amateur league Serie D.

On 25 July 2008 the Italian Football Federation confirmed that Avellino had been readmitted to Serie B to replace Messina.

On 31 July 2008 Treviso was penalized 3 points; however it ultimately changed to €15,000 fine by Camera di Conciliazione e Arbitrato per lo Sport of CONI.

Brescia and Parma were the first clubs to sack their managers. The rondinelle sacked Serse Cosmi, with past UEFA Champions League experience at Udinese, replacing him with well-experienced 67-year-old boss Nedo Sonetti, whereas Parma opted to dismiss Luigi Cagni from the coaching post and appoint former Palermo boss Francesco Guidolin. Brescia completed its replacement prior to the two club's meeting in Brescia in Week 6, Parma the day after. Several other coaching dismissals soon followed, regarding Avellino (former Foggia boss Salvatore Campilongo replacing Giuseppe Incocciati), Ascoli (former Juventus youth team coach Vincenzo Chiarenza taking over from Nello Di Costanzo) and Mantova (with former AC Milan assistant Alessandro Costacurta replacing Giuseppe Brucato). Chiarenza and Salernitana gaffer Fabrizio Castori went in December, but Castori was soon reinstated after Bortolo Mutti's inconsistency. The shortest reign was former Argentina striker Abel Balbo, who resigned after only 4 weeks in the job. Castori was sacked again after a 2–2 draw with Treviso, and Grosseto, Modena, Pisa and Mantova also lost their coaches.

On 8 May 2009 Livorno 0–1 home loss to Triestina ensured Bari to be mathematically promoted to Serie A in advance of four weeks. The galletti, coached by former Juventus player Antonio Conte, will therefore make their return to the top flight after eight years in the Italian second division. On 11 May, Treviso was mathematically relegated to Lega Pro Prima Divisione following a 0–1 home loss to Veneto rivals Vicenza after being in the Serie A as late as the 2005–06 season.

On 16 May, Parma joined Bari by ensuring automatic promotion to Serie A in Week 40, following a 2–2 tie with Cittadella that left a gap of seven points between Francesco Guidolin's team and closest rivals Livorno with only two games remaining.

== League table ==
Pos	Team	Pld	W	D	L	GF	GA	GD	Pts	Promotion or relegation
1	Bari (C, P)	42	22	14	6	65	35	+30	80	Promotion to Serie A
2	Parma (P)	42	19	19	4	65	34	+31	76	Promotion to Serie A
3	Livorno (O, P)	42	16	20	6	64	40	+24	68	Qualification to promotion play-offs
4	Brescia	42	18	13	11	54	40	+14	67 (Note: BRE 2–0 EMP; EMP 2–2 BRE)	Qualification to promotion play-offs
5	Empoli	42	18	13	11	53	44	+9	67	Qualification to promotion play-offs
6	Grosseto	42	18	10	14	64	66	−2	64	Qualification to promotion play-offs
7	Sassuolo	42	15	15	12	57	50	+7	60	
8	Triestina	42	16	11	15	52	47	+5	59	
9	AlbinoLeffe	42	15	13	14	49	49	0	58	
10	Piacenza	42	14	13	15	48	48	0	55	
11	Frosinone	42	13	14	15	48	53	−5	53	
12	Vicenza	42	13	13	16	44	41	+3	52 (Note: VIC 1–0 MAN; MAN 0–0 VIC)	
13	Mantova	42	12	16	14	41	46	−5	52	
14	Salernitana	42	14	9	19	46	56	−10	51 (Note: SAL: 9 pts 7–4; MOD: 6 pts 7–5; ASC: 3 pts 3–8)	
15	Modena	42	13	12	17	54	63	−9	51	
16	Ascoli (Note: 1 point deducted due to unpaid wages and other financial irregularities)	42	14	10	18	37	48	−11	51	
17	Cittadella	42	11	17	14	42	43	−1	50 (Note: CIT 2–0 RIM; RIM 1–0 CIT)	
18	Rimini (R)	42	13	11	18	43	56	−13	50	Qualification to relegation play-offs
19	Ancona	42	14	7	21	54	66	−12	49	Qualification to relegation play-offs
20	Pisa (R, E, R, R)	42	12	12	18	45	55	−10	48	Relegation to Serie D
21	Avellino (Note: 2 points deducted due to administrative irregularities) (R, E)	42	9	15	18	41	61	−20	40	Relegation to Serie D
22	Treviso (Note: 1 point deducted due to administrative irregularities) (R, E, D, E)	42	7	15	20	37	62	−25	35	Relegation to Eccellenza

Source: http://www.corrieredellosport.it/live/SerieB/classifica.shtml
Rules for classification: 1) points; 2) goal difference; 3) number of goals scored.
(C) Champions; (D) Disqualified; (E) Eliminated; (O) Play-off winners; (P) Promoted; (R) Relegated

== Results ==
Home \ Away	ALB	ANC	ASC	AVE	BAR	BRE	CIT	EMP	FRO	GRO	LIV	MAN	MOD	PAR	PIA	PIS	RIM	SAL	SAS	TRV	TRI	VIC
AlbinoLeffe	—	3–4	2–0	2–1	1–4	1–1	2–0	0–0	2–2	4–1	0–1	1–2	2–1	1–0	0–0	1–1	1–2	1–0	1–0	2–0	2–1	0–4
Ancona	1–0	—	0–0	0–1	0–3	2–0	1–2	1–2	1–4	1–1	2–2	2–1	3–1	2–0	0–1	2–4	5–0	3–1	2–1	2–1	2–1	3–2
Ascoli	2–2	2–0	—	2–1	0–1	1–0	1–2	1–0	2–1	0–2	2–3	2–0	1–2	0–1	2–0	1–0	1–1	0–2	1–1	1–0	1–1	1–0
Avellino	0–0	3–0	0–2	—	2–1	1–1	0–0	0–1	0–0	2–2	1–3	1–1	4–3	3–3	1–1	2–0	0–2	1–1	0–0	1–0	1–2	1–0
Bari	1–2	2–1	2–2	3–0	—	1–1	2–0	0–0	2–1	3–1	0–0	1–0	4–1	0–2	1–0	1–0	3–0	1–0	0–3	4–1	1–1	1–1
Brescia	1–0	3–0	2–1	3–0	0–0	—	0–0	2–0	2–1	1–0	2–2	0–0	1–1	0–0	0–1	4–0	0–1	1–0	4–2	0–0	3–2	2–1
Cittadella	0–0	0–0	0–0	4–0	1–1	2–0	—	0–2	0–0	0–2	0–0	0–2	4–0	2–2	4–4	1–0	2–0	0–0	1–1	1–1	0–3	0–1
Empoli	0–0	1–3	3–0	1–1	2–0	2–2	0–1	—	1–1	1–1	2–1	1–1	3–1	1–4	3–2	0–3	2–1	2–0	3–2	2–1	4–0	2–0
Frosinone	2–0	1–0	2–0	2–0	0–0	0–3	1–0	0–1	—	2–0	1–1	1–2	1–0	1–2	1–0	1–1	3–1	0–2	2–2	1–0	2–2	0–0
Grosseto	2–2	2–1	1–0	3–2	1–1	2–1	1–1	2–2	2–1	—	2–3	1–1	2–1	1–0	3–0	4–1	1–3	6–2	1–2	4–1	1–0	2–1
Livorno	0–1	2–3	1–0	0–0	1–1	2–0	1–1	0–0	5–2	0–0	—	1–1	1–2	2–2	3–0	1–1	2–1	3–0	3–2	0–0	0–1	1–1
Mantova	1–0	2–2	0–0	1–1	0–2	0–2	2–1	1–1	2–0	2–1	2–5	—	2–2	1–3	0–0	2–1	1–0	1–1	1–1	3–1	0–1	0–0
Modena	0–2	1–0	3–0	2–1	0–2	1–3	3–3	3–0	2–0	1–1	0–0	1–0	—	2–2	1–0	3–3	1–1	0–1	2–0	1–1	0–0	3–1
Parma	3–1	4–1	2–0	1–0	1–1	1–0	1–0	1–0	2–2	4–0	0–0	1–0	0–0	—	1–1	2–0	1–1	0–0	1–1	0–0	2–1	4–0
Piacenza	1–2	2–0	2–0	1–2	2–2	2–2	1–0	1–1	3–0	2–3	1–1	1–2	1–0	1–1	—	1–0	0–0	0–1	2–2	2–0	0–2	1–0
Pisa	2–0	2–0	1–1	1–1	0–1	0–1	0–3	2–0	3–1	1–2	2–1	1–1	1–0	2–1	1–3	—	1–3	0–0	0–0	2–1	3–1	0–2
Rimini	1–1	2–1	0–1	2–3	1–1	2–0	1–0	0–1	0–0	2–0	1–1	1–0	4–3	0–0	0–2	1–1	—	2–0	1–2	2–2	0–2	0–1
Salernitana	4–2	2–1	1–2	1–0	3–2	3–0	1–2	0–1	3–2	2–0	0–2	2–1	3–2	1–2	0–1	1–1	2–3	—	1–0	2–2	0–1	0–0
Sassuolo	1–0	1–0	1–0	1–1	1–3	0–0	3–1	0–4	1–1	4–0	2–3	1–2	3–0	2–2	2–1	3–1	1–0	1–0	—	2–0	1–1	0–0
Treviso	1–1	2–2	1–1	2–1	0–2	3–2	0–1	2–0	1–2	1–0	0–4	0–0	0–1	2–2	3–2	0–2	1–0	2–2	2–3	—	1–0	0–1
Triestina	1–1	1–0	1–2	3–1	1–2	1–2	2–1	2–0	2–2	2–3	1–1	1–0	0–1	0–3	0–0	1–0	4–0	3–1	1–1	0–0	—	2–1
Vicenza	0–3	0–0	3–1	3–0	1–2	1–2	1–1	1–1	0–1	5–0	0–1	1–0	2–2	1–1	1–2	0–0	2–0	2–0	1–0	1–1	1–0	—

Source: http://www.lega-calcio.it
Legend: Blue = home team win; Yellow = draw; Red = away team win.

== Top goalscorers ==
Updated to games played on 30 May 2009

24 goals

- (Italy) Francesco Tavano (Livorno)

23 goals

- (Brazil) Barreto (Bari)

18 goals

- (Italy) Salvatore Bruno (Modena)
- (Italy) Riccardo Meggiorini (Cittadella)

17 goals

- (Italy) Salvatore Mastronunzio (Ancona)
- (Italy) Daniele Vantaggiato (Rimini/Parma)

16 goals

- (Italy) Alessandro Noselli (Sassuolo)

15 goals

- (Italy) Andrea Caracciolo (Brescia)
- (Italy) Éder (Frosinone)
- (Italy) Marco Sansovini (Grosseto)

13 goals

- (Italy) Arturo Di Napoli (Salernitana)
- (Italy) Alessandro Diamanti (Livorno)
- (Italy) Francesco Ruopolo (AlbinoLeffe)

12 goals

- (Croatia) Saša Bjelanović (Vicenza)
- (Italy) Francesco Lodi (Empoli)
- (Italy) Cristiano Lucarelli (Parma)
- (Italy) Alberto Paloschi (Parma)
- (Austria) Thomas Pichlmann (Grosseto)
- (Italy) Nicola Pozzi (Empoli)

== Play-off ==
=== Promotion ===
Semi-finals
First legs played 7 June 2009; return legs played 11 June 2009

Team 1	Agg.	Team 2	1st leg	2nd leg
Grosseto (6)	3–4	(3) Livorno	2–0	1–4
Empoli (5)	1–4	(4) Brescia	1–1	0–3

Finals
First leg played 14 June 2009; return leg played 20 June 2009

Team 1	Agg.	Team 2	1st leg	2nd leg
Brescia (4)	2–5	(3) Livorno	2–2	0–3

=== Relegation ===
First leg played 6 June 2009; return leg played 13 June 2009

Team 1	Agg.	Team 2	1st leg	2nd leg
Ancona (19)	2–1	(18) Rimini	1–1	1–0

== Managerial changes ==
Team	Outgoing manager	Manner of departure	Date of vacancy	Replaced by	Date of appointment
Empoli	Luigi Cagni	Mutual consent	26 May 2008	Silvio Baldini	26 May 2008
Parma	Andrea Manzo	End of caretaker spell	29 May 2008	Luigi Cagni	29 May 2008
Rimini	Leonardo Acori	Mutual consent	1 June 2008	Elvio Selighini	3 June 2008
Livorno	Fernando Orsi	Mutual consent	18 May 2008	Leonardo Acori	4 June 2008
Frosinone	Alberto Cavasin	Mutual consent	5 June 2008	Piero Braglia	6 June 2008
Piacenza	Mario Somma	Sacked	1 June 2008	Stefano Pioli	11 June 2008
Salernitana	Fabio Brini	Mutual consent	23 May 2008	Fabrizio Castori	12 June 2008
Grosseto	Stefano Pioli	End of contract	1 June 2008	Elio Gustinetti	14 June 2008
Ascoli	Ivo Iaconi	End of contract	25 June 2008	Nello Di Costanzo	25 June 2008
Sassuolo	Massimiliano Allegri	Mutual consent	29 May 2008	Andrea Mandorlini	7 July 2008
Treviso	Giuseppe Pillon	Mutual consent	18 July 2008	Luca Gotti	21 July 2008
Avellino	Alessandro Calori	End of contract	1 June 2008	Giuseppe Incocciati	26 July 2008
Brescia	Serse Cosmi	Sacked	25 September 2008	Nedo Sonetti	25 September 2008
Parma	Luigi Cagni	Sacked	30 September 2008	Francesco Guidolin	30 September 2008
Avellino	Giuseppe Incocciati	Sacked	7 October 2008	Salvatore Campilongo	7 October 2008
Ascoli	Nello Di Costanzo	Sacked	21 October 2008	Vincenzo Chiarenza	22 October 2008
Mantova	Giuseppe Brucato	Sacked	27 October 2008	Alessandro Costacurta	27 October 2008
Ascoli	Vincenzo Chiarenza	Sacked	7 December 2008	Franco Colomba	7 December 2008
Salernitana	Fabrizio Castori	Sacked	6 December 2008	Bortolo Mutti	7 December 2008
Salernitana	Bortolo Mutti	Sacked	24 January 2009	Fabrizio Castori	24 January 2009
Modena	Daniele Zoratto	Mutual consent	26 January 2009	Luigi Apolloni (caretaker)	26 January 2009
Mantova	Alessandro Costacurta	Resigned	9 February 2009	Mario Somma	9 February 2009
Grosseto	Elio Gustinetti	Sacked	15 February 2009	Ezio Rossi	15 February 2009
Treviso	Luca Gotti	Sacked	24 February 2009	Abel Balbo	24 February 2009
Treviso	Abel Balbo	Resigned	18 March 2009	Luca Gotti	19 March 2009
Grosseto	Ezio Rossi	Sacked	25 March 2009	Elio Gustinetti	25 March 2009
Salernitana	Fabrizio Castori	Sacked	4 April 2009	Fabio Brini	4 April 2009
Pisa	Giampiero Ventura	Sacked	19 April 2009	Bruno Giordano	19 April 2009
Rimini	Elvio Selighini	Sacked	27 April 2009	Guido Carboni	27 April 2009
Ancona	Francesco Monaco	Sacked	3 May 2009	Sandro Salvioni	3 May 2009
Brescia	Nedo Sonetti	Sacked	19 May 2009	Alberto Cavasin	20 May 2009
Livorno	Leonardo Acori	Sacked	23 May 2009	Gennaro Ruotolo (caretaker)	23 May 2009

== Attendances ==
#	Club	Average
1	Bari	15,345
2	Salernitana	11,441
3	Parma	10,301
4	Pisa	9,675
5	Livorno	7,851
6	Vicenza	7,390
7	Mantova	6,421
8	Triestina	5,730
9	Ancona	5,669
10	Modena	5,636
11	Ascoli	5,237
12	Rimini	4,201
13	Empoli	4,166
14	Sassuolo	3,847
15	Frosinone	3,435
16	AlbinoLeffe	3,358
17	Grosseto	3,251
18	Piacenza	3,173
19	Brescia	2,996
20	Treviso	2,862
21	Avellino	2,737
22	Cittadella	1,891
