= 2008–09 AS Livorno Calcio season =

Livorno
2008–09 season
- President: Aldo Spinelli
- Manager: Leonardo Acori
- Stadium: Stadio Armando Picchi
- Serie B: 3rd
- Play-offs: Winners
- Coppa Italia: Group stage
- Top goalscorer: League: Francesco Tavano (22); All: Francesco Tavano (24)
- Average home league attendance: 7,864

The 2008–09 season was the 94th season in the existence of AS Livorno Calcio and the club's first season back in the second division of Italian football. In addition to the domestic league, Livorno participated in this season's edition of the Coppa Italia.

== Pre-season and friendlies ==
Win Draw Loss

== Competitions ==
=== Overall record ===
| Competition | First match | Last match | Starting round | Final position | Record | | | | | | | |
| Competition | First match | Last match | Starting round | Final position | Pld | W | D | L | GF | GA | GD | Win % |
|---|---|---|---|---|---|---|---|---|---|---|---|---|
| Serie B | 30 August 2008 | 30 May 2009 | Matchday 1 | 3rd | 42 | 16 | 20 | 6 | 64 | 40 | +24 | 38.10 |
| Coppa Italia | 17 August 2008 | 1 October 2008 | Second round | Fourth round | 3 | 2 | 0 | 1 | 8 | 3 | +5 | 66.67 |
| Total | | | | | 45 | 18 | 20 | 7 | 72 | 43 | +29 | 40.00 |

Source: Competitions

=== Serie B ===
==== League table ====
| Pos | Team | Pld | W | D | L | GF | GA | GD | Pts | Promotion or relegation |
|---|---|---|---|---|---|---|---|---|---|---|
| 1 | Bari (C, P) | 42 | 22 | 14 | 6 | 65 | 35 | +30 | 80 | Promotion to Serie A |
| 2 | Parma (P) | 42 | 19 | 19 | 4 | 65 | 34 | +31 | 76 | Promotion to Serie A |
| 3 | Livorno (O, P) | 42 | 16 | 20 | 6 | 64 | 40 | +24 | 68 | Qualification to promotion play-offs |
| 4 | Brescia | 42 | 18 | 13 | 11 | 54 | 40 | +14 | 67 (Note: BRE 2–0 EMP; EMP 2–2 BRE) | Qualification to promotion play-offs |
| 5 | Empoli | 42 | 18 | 13 | 11 | 53 | 44 | +9 | 67 | Qualification to promotion play-offs |

Source: http://www.corrieredellosport.it/live/SerieB/classifica.shtml
Rules for classification: 1) points; 2) goal difference; 3) number of goals scored.
(C) Champions; (O) Play-off winners; (P) Promoted

==== Results summary ====
| Overall | | | | | | | | Home | | | | | | Away | | | | | |
| Pld | W | D | L | GF | GA | GD | Pts | W | D | L | GF | GA | GD | W | D | L | GF | GA | GD |
|---|---|---|---|---|---|---|---|---|---|---|---|---|---|---|---|---|---|---|---|
| 0 | 0 | 0 | 0 | 0 | 0 | 0 | 0 | 0 | 0 | 0 | 0 | 0 | 0 | 0 | 0 | 0 | 0 | 0 | 0 |

Source: Serie B

==== Results by round ====
| Round | 1 | 2 | 3 | 4 | 5 | 6 | 7 | 8 | 9 | 10 | 11 | 12 | 13 | 14 | 15 | 16 | 17 | 18 | 19 | 20 | 21 | 22 | 23 | 24 | 25 | 26 | 27 | 28 | 29 | 30 | 31 | 32 | 33 | 34 | 35 | 36 | 37 | 38 | 39 | 40 | 41 | 42 |
|---|---|---|---|---|---|---|---|---|---|---|---|---|---|---|---|---|---|---|---|---|---|---|---|---|---|---|---|---|---|---|---|---|---|---|---|---|---|---|---|---|---|---|
| Ground | A | H | A | H | A | H | A | H | A | H | A | H | A | H | A | A | H | A | H | A | H | H | A | H | A | H | A | H | A | H | A | H | A | H | A | H | H | A | H | A | H | A |
| Result | W | D | D | D | D | D | L | W | D | W | D | W | W | D | D | D | W | D | W | W | W | D | W | W | L | D | W | D | D | D | D | L | D | D | W | D | L | W | L | W | L | W |
| Position | 1 | 3 | 5 | 7 | 9 | 11 | 13 | 9 | 12 | 9 | 10 | 6 | 4 | 5 | 5 | 6 | 6 | 3 | 1 | 1 | 1 | 2 | 2 | 1 | 1 | 1 | 1 | 1 | 2 | 2 | 3 | 3 | 3 | 3 | 3 | 3 | 3 | 3 | 3 | 3 | 3 | 3 |

Source: Serie B
A = Away; H = Home; W = Win; D = Draw; L = Loss

==== Matches ====
| 30 August 2008 1 | Avellino | 1–3 | Livorno | Avellino |
| --:-- CEST (UTC+2) |

| 7 September 2008 2 | Livorno | 1–1 | Mantova | Livorno |
| --:-- CEST (UTC+2) | | | | Stadium: Stadio Armando Picchi |

| 12 September 2008 3 | Piacenza | 1–1 | Livorno | Piacenza |
| --:-- CEST (UTC+2) |

| 20 September 2008 4 | Livorno | 1–1 | Pisa | Livorno |
| --:-- CEST (UTC+2) | | | | Stadium: Stadio Armando Picchi |

| 23 September 2008 5 | Bari | 0–0 | Livorno | Bari |
| --:-- CEST (UTC+2) |

| 27 September 2008 6 | Livorno | 0–0 | Grosseto | Livorno |
| --:-- CEST (UTC+2) | | | | Stadium: Stadio Armando Picchi |

| 6 October 2008 7 | Empoli | 2–1 | Livorno | Empoli |
| --:-- CEST (UTC+2) |

| 12 October 2008 8 | Livorno | 5–2 | Frosinone | Livorno |
| --:-- CEST (UTC+2) | | | | Stadium: Stadio Armando Picchi |

| 18 October 2008 9 | Cittadella | 0–0 | Livorno | Cittadella |
| --:-- CEST (UTC+2) |

| 25 October 2008 10 | Livorno | 2–1 | Rimini | Livorno |
| --:-- CEST (UTC+2) | | | | Stadium: Stadio Armando Picchi |

| 28 October 2008 11 | Ancona | 2–2 | Livorno | Ancona |
| --:-- CEST (UTC+2) |

| 3 November 2008 12 | Livorno | 2–0 | Brescia | Livorno |
| --:-- CET (UTC+1) | | | | Stadium: Stadio Armando Picchi |

| 8 November 2008 13 | Vicenza | 0–1 | Livorno | Vicenza |
| --:-- CET (UTC+1) |

| 15 November 2008 14 | Livorno | 0–0 | Treviso | Livorno |
| --:-- CET (UTC+1) | | | | Stadium: Stadio Armando Picchi |

| 22 November 2008 15 | Parma | 0–0 | Livorno | Parma |
| --:-- CET (UTC+1) |

| 29 November 2008 16 | Modena | 0–0 | Livorno | Modena |
| --:-- CET (UTC+1) |

| 6 December 2008 17 | Livorno | 3–0 | Salernitana | Livorno |
| --:-- CET (UTC+1) | | | | Stadium: Stadio Armando Picchi |

| 13 December 2008 18 | Triestina | 1–1 | Livorno | Trieste |
| --:-- CET (UTC+1) |

| 20 December 2008 19 | Livorno | 3–2 | Sassuolo | Livorno |
| --:-- CET (UTC+1) | | | | Stadium: Stadio Armando Picchi |

| 10 January 2009 20 | AlbinoLeffe | 0–1 | Livorno | Bergamo |
| --:-- CET (UTC+1) |

| 16 January 2009 21 | Livorno | 1–0 | Ascoli | Livorno |
| --:-- CET (UTC+1) | | | | Stadium: Stadio Armando Picchi |

| 24 January 2009 22 | Livorno | 0–0 | Avellino | Livorno |
| --:-- CET (UTC+1) | | | | Stadium: Stadio Armando Picchi |

| 2 February 2009 23 | Mantova | 2–5 | Livorno | Mantua |
| --:-- CET (UTC+1) |

| 7 February 2009 24 | Livorno | 3–0 | Piacenza | Livorno |
| --:-- CET (UTC+1) | | | | Stadium: Stadio Armando Picchi |

| 14 February 2009 25 | Pisa | 2–1 | Livorno | Pisa |
| --:-- CET (UTC+1) |

| 17 February 2009 26 | Livorno | 1–1 | Bari | Livorno |
| --:-- CET (UTC+1) | | | | Stadium: Stadio Armando Picchi |

| 21 February 2009 27 | Grosseto | 2–3 | Livorno | Grosseto |
| --:-- CET (UTC+1) |

| 27 February 2009 28 | Livorno | 0–0 | Empoli | Livorno |
| --:-- CET (UTC+1) | | | | Stadium: Stadio Armando Picchi |

| 7 March 2009 29 | Frosinone | 1–1 | Livorno | Frosinone |
| --:-- CET (UTC+1) |

| 14 March 2009 30 | Livorno | 1–1 | Cittadella | Livorno |
| --:-- CET (UTC+1) | | | | Stadium: Stadio Armando Picchi |

| 17 March 2009 31 | Rimini | 1–1 | Livorno | Rimini |
| --:-- CET (UTC+1) |

| 21 March 2009 32 | Livorno | 2–3 | Ancona | Livorno |
| --:-- CET (UTC+1) | | | | Stadium: Stadio Armando Picchi |

| 29 March 2009 33 | Brescia | 2–2 | Livorno | Brescia |
| --:-- CEST (UTC+2) |

| 4 April 2009 34 | Livorno | 1–1 | Vicenza | Livorno |
| --:-- CEST (UTC+2) | | | | Stadium: Stadio Armando Picchi |

| 18 April 2009 36 | Livorno | 2–2 | Parma | Livorno |
| --:-- CEST (UTC+2) | | | | Stadium: Stadio Armando Picchi |

| 21 April 2009 35 | Treviso | 0–4 | Livorno | Treviso |
| --:-- CEST (UTC+2) |

| 25 April 2009 37 | Livorno | 1–2 | Modena | Livorno |
| --:-- CEST (UTC+2) | | | | Stadium: Stadio Armando Picchi |

| 2 May 2009 38 | Salernitana | 0–2 | Livorno | Salerno |
| --:-- CEST (UTC+2) |

| 8 May 2009 39 | Livorno | 0–1 | Triestina | Livorno |
| --:-- CEST (UTC+2) | | | | Stadium: Stadio Armando Picchi |

| 16 May 2009 40 | Sassuolo | 2–3 | Livorno | Sassuolo |
| --:-- CEST (UTC+2) |

| 23 May 2009 41 | Livorno | 0–1 | AlbinoLeffe | Livorno |
| --:-- CEST (UTC+2) | | | | Stadium: Stadio Armando Picchi |

| 30 May 2009 42 | Ascoli | 2–3 | Livorno | Ascoli Piceno |
| --:-- CEST (UTC+2) | Belingheri 47'; Soncin 77' | | Diamanti 55'; Tavano 78', 89' | Stadium: Stadio Cino e Lillo Del Duca; Attendance: 5,618; Referee: Paolo Dondarini |

=== Coppa Italia ===
| 17 August 2008 Second round | Livorno | 3–0 | Novara | Livorno |
| 20:45 | Tavano 9'; Diamanti 68'; Volpe 83' | | | Stadium: Stadio Armando Picchi; Referee: Leonardo Baracani |

| 23 August 2008 Third round | Crotone | 0–3 | Livorno | Crotone |
| 20:30 | | | Filippini 27'; Diamanti 49'; Tavano 58' | Stadium: Stadio Ezio Scida; Referee: Maurizio Ciampi |

| 1 October 2008 Fourth round | Torino | 3–2 (a.e.t.) | Livorno | Turin |
| 20:30 | Corini 8'; Zanetti 45'; Barone 94' | | Diamanti 19', 86' (pen.) | Stadium: Stadio Olimpico di Torino; Referee: Andrea De Marco |
