= List of Parma Calcio 1913 managers =

The following is a list of managers of Parma Calcio 1913 and their major honours from the beginning of the club's history in 1913 to the present day. The longest-serving and most successful person to manage Parma is Nevio Scala, who won one Coppa Italia title, one UEFA Cup Winners' Cup, one European Super Cup and a UEFA Cup in his 7-year reign as manager.

== Managerial history ==
Cesare Maldini joined Parma as manager in 1978 when the club was in Serie C and secured the club promotion back to Serie B in his first year in charge; he left in 1980. Several managers came and went as Parma continued to yo-yo between the leagues, before they returned to Serie B under 1985-appointed Arrigo Sacchi in 1986 after finishing level on points at the top of the league with Modena. Parma's first season back in Serie B was a successful one, missing out on promotion to Italy's top tier by just three points and eliminating A.C. Milan from the Coppa Italia, a result that convinced owner Silvio Berlusconi, to hire Sacchi as the new manager of the Rossoneri. His replacement, Zdeněk Zeman, was fired after just seven matches and replaced by Giampieri Vitali, who secured two mid-table finishes. In 1989, Vitali was replaced by Nevio Scala, who would introduce a 5–3–2 formation that would be the basis for much of the club's success during his reign.

Scala's Parma secured promotion from Serie B in 1989-90 and went on to establish themselves as one of the top teams in Parma, winning four major trophies: the Coppa Italia win over Juventus the Cup Winners' Cup at Wembley Stadium in England in 1993; the 1993 European Super Cup with victory over A.C. Milan; the 1995 UEFA Cup after two-legged triumph over Juventus. Carlo Ancelotti was appointed as Scala's replacement in 1996 and immediately overhauled the team that summer, but despite recording the club's highest ever league position in 1997 – second place – and leading the club into the Champions League for the first time, Ancelotti was sacked in 1998 and replaced by Alberto Malesani. Malesani managed the club to its most successful ever season in 1998–99, when it won the Coppa Italia and the UEFA Cup. An unsatisfactory start to the season after next made way for a brief return for Arrigo Sacchi in January 2001, who soon succumbed to poor health and was replaced by Renzo Ulivieri, who was then sacked in October.

Daniel Passarella was then hired and soon sacked after a calamitous month in charge. He was succeeded by Pietro Carmignani, who was in charge for the second time and secured a third Coppa Italia triumph, Parma's most recent title. Cesare Prandelli was announced as the new man-in-charge of the Emilian side in May 2002. He lasted two seasons and Silvio Baldini followed him, but was replaced by Pietro Carmignani, who enjoyed his third spell at the helm. Mario Beretta and Stefano Pioli both had an unsuccessful time at the club; the latter being replaced in February 2007 by Claudio Ranieri, who miraculously saved the side from relegation to Serie B before leaving at the end of the season. In the 2007–08 season, Parma again battled with relegation. Three different head coaches (Domenico Di Carlo, Héctor Cúper, and caretaker Andrea Manzo) took charge that season, but none were able to preserve Parma's Serie A status.

Parma's stay in Serie B started badly under Luigi Cagni, who was sacked six games into the season and replaced by Francesco Guidolin who guided the club back to Serie A. Guidolin's contract was not renewed and he left for Udinese, swapping posts with Parma's newly appointed Pasquale Marino in the summer of 2010. Marino's time in charge lasted until 3 April 2011, when he was sacked by President Tommaso Ghirardi after a disappointing home defeat to rock-bottom Bari saw Parma fall within two points of the relegation zone with seven matches to go. Experienced coach Franco Colomba replaced him two days later, signing a contract until the summer of 2012. His change to a new 4–4–1–1 formation from Marino's 4–3–3 brought about a dramatic change in fortune. Fuelled by Amauri and Sebastian Giovinco's work in tandem, Parma comfortably avoided relegation, earning some notable scalps along the way. An up and down start to the 2011–12 season saw Parma in a comfortable 10th position after 11 games. However, a six-game winless streak culminating in a 5–0 defeat away to Inter was enough for Ghirardi to let Colomba go on 9 January 2012, although Parma were 15th and still 7 points clear of relegation, having picked up 19 points from 17 games.

Roberto Donadoni was chosen as Colomba's replacement immediately. His initial deal ran until 2013, but this was extended by two years in October 2012. Donadoni led the club to three successful top ten finishes before a bottom-placed finish in the year of the club's bankruptcy in 2015. Ex-player Luigi Apolloni was appointed head coach of the phoenix club and led the club to promotion from Serie D at the first time of asking. Following a series of poor results, he was sacked as manager in November 2017. The next permanent manager, Roberto D'Aversa, led a recovery that resulted in the club's second successive promotion in 2016–17 before a third in 2017–18 Serie B.

== Statistics ==
Information correct as of 7 January 2021. Only competitive matches are counted. Caretaker managers are shown in italics.

Table headers

- Nationality – If the manager played international football as a player, the country/countries he played for are shown. Otherwise, the manager's nationality is given as their country of birth.
- From – The year of the manager's first game for Parma.
- To – The year of the manager's last game for Parma.
- P – The number of games managed for Parma.
- W – The number of games won as a manager.
- D – The number of games draw as a manager.
- L – The number of games lost as a manager.
- GF – The number of goals scored under his management.
- GA – The number of goals conceded under his management.
- Win% – The total winning percentage under his management.
- Honours – The trophies won while managing Parma.

List of Parma F.C. managers
| Name | Nationality | From | To | P | W | D | L | GF | GA | Win% (Note: Win% is rounded to two decimal places) | Honours | Ref |
|---|---|---|---|---|---|---|---|---|---|---|---|---|
| Zdeněk Zeman | Czech Republic | 1 July 1987 | 27 October 1987 | 12 | 4 | 4 | 4 | 14 | 16 | 33.33 | | |
| Giampieri Vitali | Italy | 27 October 1987 | 30 June 1989 | 76 | 17 | 43 | 16 | 64 | 62 | 22.37 | | |
| Nevio Scala | Italy | 1 July 1989 | 30 June 1996 | 322 | 147 | 96 | 79 | 409 | 276 | 45.65 | 1 Coppa Italia; 1 UEFA Cup Winners' Cup; 1 UEFA Cup; 1 UEFA Super Cup | |
| Carlo Ancelotti | Italy | 1 July 1996 | 30 June 1998 | 87 | 42 | 27 | 18 | 124 | 85 | 48.28 | | |
| Alberto Malesani | Italy | 16 June 1998 | 8 January 2001 | 126 | 63 | 33 | 30 | 213 | 130 | 50.00 | 1 Coppa Italia; 1 Supercoppa Italiana; 1 UEFA Cup | |
| Arrigo Sacchi | Italy | 9 January 2001 | 1 February 2001 | 4 | 1 | 2 | 1 | 5 | 4 | 25.00 | | |
| Renzo Ulivieri | Italy | 2 February 2001 | 31 October 2001 | 36 | 17 | 9 | 10 | 53 | 33 | 47.22 | | |
| Pietro Carmignani | Italy | 1 November 2001 | 5 November 2001 | 2 | 1 | 1 | 0 | 2 | 1 | 50.00 | | |
| Daniel Passarella | Argentina | 6 November 2001 | 17 December 2001 | 10 | 2 | 2 | 6 | 13 | 17 | 20.00 | | |
| Pietro Carmignani | Italy | 18 December 2001 | 30 June 2002 | 27 | 12 | 5 | 10 | 34 | 30 | 44.44 | 1 Coppa Italia | |
| Cesare Prandelli | Italy | 1 July 2002 | 30 June 2004 | 85 | 38 | 24 | 23 | 138 | 104 | 44.71 | | |
| Silvio Baldini | Italy | 1 July 2004 | 13 December 2004 | 21 | 4 | 7 | 10 | 20 | 32 | 19.05 | | |
| Pietro Carmignani | Italy | 15 December 2004 | 30 June 2005 | 35 | 12 | 11 | 12 | 42 | 51 | 34.29 | | |
| Mario Beretta | Italy | 12 July 2005 | 30 June 2006 | 43 | 14 | 11 | 18 | 49 | 62 | 32.56 | | |
| Stefano Pioli | Italy | 1 July 2006 | 12 February 2007 | 32 | 9 | 7 | 16 | 31 | 51 | 28.13 | | |
| Claudio Ranieri | Italy | 13 February 2007 | 11 June 2007 | 18 | 7 | 6 | 5 | 24 | 19 | 38.89 | | |
| Domenico Di Carlo | Italy | 12 June 2007 | 10 March 2008 | 28 | 5 | 10 | 13 | 33 | 46 | 17.86 | | |
| Héctor Cúper | Argentina | 11 March 2008 | 12 May 2008 | 10 | 2 | 3 | 5 | 10 | 17 | 20.00 | | |
| Andrea Manzo | Italy | 12 May 2008 | 29 May 2008 | 1 | 0 | 0 | 1 | 0 | 2 | 0.00 | | |
| Luigi Cagni | Italy | 29 May 2008 | 30 September 2008 | 8 | 2 | 3 | 3 | 11 | 10 | 25.00 | | |
| Francesco Guidolin | Italy | 30 September 2008 | 16 May 2010 | 75 | 32 | 26 | 17 | 105 | 81 | 42.67 | | |
| Pasquale Marino | Italy | 2 June 2010 | 3 April 2011 | 33 | 8 | 12 | 13 | 32 | 44 | 24.24 | | |
| Franco Colomba | Italy | 5 April 2011 | 9 January 2012 | 26 | 10 | 6 | 10 | 34 | 38 | 38.46 | | |
| Roberto Donadoni | Italy | 9 January 2012 | 22 June 2015 | 141 | 47 | 39 | 55 | 181 | 195 | 33.33 | | |
| Luigi Apolloni | Italy | 27 July 2015 | 26 November 2016 | 58 | 37 | 16 | 5 | 112 | 42 | 63.79 | | |
| Stefano Morrone | Italy | 27 November 2016 | 4 December 2016 | 2 | 0 | 1 | 1 | 2 | 3 | 0.00 | | |
| Roberto D'Aversa | Italy | 4 December 2016 | 23 August 2020 | 151 | 64 | 34 | 53 | 201 | 182 | 42.38 | | |
| Fabio Liverani | Italy | 28 August 2020 | 7 January 2021 | 18 | 4 | 6 | 8 | 18 | 33 | 22.22 | | |
| Roberto D'Aversa | Italy | 7 January 2021 | | 0 | 0 | 0 | 0 | 0 | 0 | — | | |
