= 2009–10 Serie A =

108th season of top-tier Italian football

Serie A
- Season: 2009–10
- Dates: 22 August 2009 – 16 May 2010
- Champions: Internazionale; 18th title
- Relegated: Atalanta; Siena; Livorno
- Champions League: Internazionale; Roma; Milan; Sampdoria
- Europa League: Palermo; Napoli; Juventus
- Matches: 380
- Goals: 992 (2.61 per match)
- Top goalscorer: Antonio Di Natale (29 goals)
- Biggest home win: Juventus 5–1 Sampdoria (28 October 2009); Milan 4–0 Siena (17 January 2010)
- Biggest away win: Genoa 0–5 Internazionale (17 October 2009)
- Highest scoring: Internazionale 5–3 Palermo (29 October 2009); Genoa 5–3 Cagliari (14 March 2010)

The 2009–10 Serie A (known as the Serie A TIM for sponsorship reasons) was the 108th season of top-tier Italian football, the 78th in a round-robin tournament. There were three promoted teams from the Serie B, replacing the three teams that were relegated following the 2008–09 season. Nike provided a new match ball – the T90 Ascente – for this season. Following the season, citing a larger television contract, the seventeen teams that survived the season and the three promoted sides formed a new league akin to England's Premier League.

The title race was only settled on the last day of the season. The title was won by Internazionale, their fifth title in a row. Inter would go on to complete the first and only treble by an Italian team by winning the Coppa Italia and Champions League.

== Teams ==
The following 20 teams participated in the 2009–10 season:

Locations of the 2009–10 Serie A teams

Club	City	Stadium	Capacity	2008–09 season
Atalanta	Bergamo	Atleti Azzurri d'Italia	26,393	11th in Serie A
Bari	Bari	San Nicola	58,270	Serie B Champions
Bologna	Bologna	Renato Dall'Ara	39,444	17th in Serie A
Cagliari	Cagliari	Sant'Elia	23,486	9th in Serie A
Catania	Catania	Angelo Massimino	23,420	15th in Serie A
Chievo Verona	Verona	Marc'Antonio Bentegodi	39,211	16th in Serie A
Fiorentina	Florence	Artemio Franchi (Florence)	47,282	4th in Serie A
Genoa	Genoa	Luigi Ferraris	36,685	5th in Serie A
Internazionale	Milan	San Siro	80,074	Serie A Champions
Juventus	Turin	Olimpico di Torino	27,994	2nd in Serie A
Lazio	Rome	Olimpico	72,698	10th in Serie A
Livorno	Livorno	Armando Picchi	19,238	Serie B Playoff Winners
Milan	Milan	San Siro	80,074	3rd in Serie A
Napoli	Naples	San Paolo	60,240	12th in Serie A
Palermo	Palermo	Renzo Barbera	37,242	8th in Serie A
Parma	Parma	Ennio Tardini	27,906	Serie B Runners-up
Roma	Rome	Olimpico	72,698	6th in Serie A
Sampdoria	Genoa	Luigi Ferraris	36,685	13th in Serie A
Siena	Siena	Artemio Franchi (Siena)	15,373	14th in Serie A
Udinese	Udine	Friuli	41,652	7th in Serie A

=== Personnel and sponsorship ===
Team	Head coach	Captain	Kit manufacturer	Shirt sponsor
Atalanta	(Italy) Bortolo Mutti	(Italy) Cristiano Doni	Errea	Sit In Sport, Daihatsu
Bari	(Italy) Giampiero Ventura	(Belgium) Jean François Gillet	Errea	Banca Popolare di Bari, Radionorba
Bologna	(Italy) Franco Colomba	(Italy) Marco Di Vaio	Macron	COGEI/Serenissima CIR/Ceramica Serenissima/Cerasarda, bigpoker.it
Cagliari	(Italy) Massimiliano Allegri	(Uruguay) Diego López	Macron	Dahlia TV, Sardegna
Catania	(Italy) Gianluca Atzori	(Italy) Giuseppe Mascara	Legea	SP Energia Siciliana, Provincia di Catania
Chievo Verona	(Italy) Domenico Di Carlo	(Italy) Sergio Pellissier	Givova	Banca Popolare di Verona/Merkur-Win
Fiorentina	(Italy) Cesare Prandelli	(Italy) Riccardo Montolivo	Lotto	Toyota
Genoa	(Italy) Gian Piero Gasperini	(Italy) Marco Rossi	Asics	Gaudì Jeans
Internazionale	(Portugal) José Mourinho	(Argentina) Javier Zanetti	Nike	Pirelli
Juventus	(Italy) Alberto Zaccheroni	(Italy) Alessandro Del Piero	Nike	New Holland
Lazio	(Italy) Edoardo Reja	(Italy) Tommaso Rocchi	Puma	Edileuropa
Livorno	(Italy) Gennaro Ruotolo	(Italy) Francesco Tavano	Asics	Gruppo Banca Carige
Milan	(Brazil) Leonardo	(Italy) Massimo Ambrosini	Adidas	Bwin
Napoli	(Italy) Walter Mazzarri	(Italy) Paolo Cannavaro	Macron	Lete
Palermo	(Italy) Walter Zenga	(Italy) Fabrizio Miccoli	Lotto	BetShop/Eurobet
Parma	(Italy) Francesco Guidolin	(Italy) Stefano Morrone	Errea	Navigare, Banca Monte Parma
Roma	(Italy) Claudio Ranieri	(Italy) Francesco Totti	Kappa	Wind
Sampdoria	(Italy) Luigi Delneri	(Italy) Angelo Palombo	Kappa	Erg Mobile
Siena	(Italy) Alberto Malesani	(Italy) Simone Vergassola	Kappa	Banca Monte dei Paschi di Siena
Udinese	(Italy) Pasquale Marino	(Italy) Antonio Di Natale	Lotto	Automobile Dacia/Frankie Garage, DESPAR/Metalnova/Uniqa/Latterie Friulane/Banca Popolare di Verona/dearchitettura.com/Vitis/Transine/Bibione

=== Managerial changes ===
Team	Outgoing head coach	Manner of departure	Date of vacancy	Position in table	Incoming head coach	Date of appointment	Position in table
Milan	(Italy) Carlo Ancelotti	Signed by Chelsea	1 June 2009	Pre-season	(Brazil) Leonardo	1 June 2009	Pre-season
Sampdoria	(Italy) Walter Mazzarri	Mutual consent	1 June 2009	Pre-season	(Italy) Luigi Delneri	1 June 2009	Pre-season
Palermo	(Italy) Davide Ballardini	Removed from managerial duties	5 June 2009	Pre-season	(Italy) Walter Zenga	5 June 2009	Pre-season
Atalanta	(Italy) Luigi Delneri	Contract expired	1 June 2009	Pre-season	(Italy) Angelo Gregucci	5 June 2009	Pre-season
Catania	(Italy) Walter Zenga	Mutual consent	1 June 2009	Pre-season	(Italy) Gianluca Atzori	10 June 2009	Pre-season
Lazio	(Italy) Delio Rossi	Contract expired	8 June 2009	Pre-season	(Italy) Davide Ballardini	16 June 2009	Pre-season
Bari	(Italy) Antonio Conte	Mutual consent	23 June 2009	Pre-season	(Italy) Giampiero Ventura	29 June 2009	Pre-season
Livorno	(Italy) Gennaro Ruotolo	End of caretaker spell	9 July 2009	Pre-season	(Italy) Vittorio Russo	13 July 2009	Pre-season
Roma	(Italy) Luciano Spalletti	Resigned	1 September 2009	20th	(Italy) Claudio Ranieri	2 September 2009	20th
Atalanta	(Italy) Angelo Gregucci	Sacked	21 September 2009	20th	(Italy) Antonio Conte	21 September 2009	20th
Napoli	(Italy) Roberto Donadoni	Sacked	6 October 2009	15th	(Italy) Walter Mazzarri	6 October 2009	15th
Bologna	(Italy) Giuseppe Papadopulo	Sacked	20 October 2009	18th	(Italy) Franco Colomba	20 October 2009	18th
Livorno	(Italy) Vittorio Russo	Sacked	21 October 2009	20th	(Italy) Serse Cosmi	21 October 2009	20th
Siena	(Italy) Marco Giampaolo	Sacked	29 October 2009	20th	(Italy) Marco Baroni	29 October 2009	20th
Palermo	(Italy) Walter Zenga	Sacked	23 November 2009	12th	(Italy) Delio Rossi	23 November 2009	12th
Siena	(Italy) Marco Baroni	Removed from managerial duties	23 November 2009	20th	(Italy) Alberto Malesani	23 November 2009	20th
Catania	(Italy) Gianluca Atzori	Sacked	8 December 2009	19th	(Serbia) Siniša Mihajlović	8 December 2009	19th
Udinese	(Italy) Pasquale Marino	Sacked	22 December 2009	15th	(Italy) Gianni De Biasi	22 December 2009	15th
Atalanta	(Italy) Antonio Conte	Resigned	7 January 2010	19th	(Italy) Walter Bonacina (caretaker)	7 January 2010	19th
Atalanta	(Italy) Walter Bonacina	End of caretaker spell	11 January 2010	19th	(Italy) Bortolo Mutti	11 January 2010	19th
Juventus	(Italy) Ciro Ferrara	Sacked	29 January 2010	6th	(Italy) Alberto Zaccheroni	29 January 2010	6th
Lazio	(Italy) Davide Ballardini	Sacked	10 February 2010	18th	(Italy) Edoardo Reja	10 February 2010	18th
Udinese	(Italy) Gianni De Biasi	Sacked	21 February 2010	16th	(Italy) Pasquale Marino	21 February 2010	16th
Livorno	(Italy) Serse Cosmi	Sacked	5 April 2010	20th	(Italy) Gennaro Ruotolo	5 April 2010	20th
Cagliari	(Italy) Massimiliano Allegri	Sacked	13 April 2010	13th	(Italy) Giorgio Melis (caretaker)	13 April 2010	12th

- ^1 Davide Ballardini was removed from his managerial duties on 5 June, contemporarily to Walter Zenga's appointment as new head coach. He successively rescinded his contract by mutual consent on 13 June.
- ^2 Gennaro Ruotolo had originally accepted to stay at Livorno as a permanent head coach after he guided the team to success through the Serie B promotion playoffs in June 2009. However, on 9 July the Technical Sector of the Italian Football Federation announced Ruotolo could not serve as head coach in the Serie A, as he was lacking the required UEFA Pro coaching badges. Following these events, UEFA Pro licensed coach Vittorio Russo was appointed as head coach, with Ruotolo actually serving as joint head coach to him despite appearing as assistant manager to Russo himself. He was successively removed from his assistant coaching post on 20 September.
- ^3 Siena Primavera (under-19 team) coach Marco Baroni was appointed permanent first team coach on 29 October, only to be moved back to his previous role on 23 November.
- ^4 Gennaro Ruotolo was allowed to act as head coach without having the required UEFA Pro coaching badges only after having received temporary dispensation from the Italian Football Federation for a 60-day period.
- ^5 Youth team coach Giorgio Melis was allowed to act as caretaker without having the required UEFA Pro coaching badges after receiving temporary dispensation from the Italian Football Federation for a 60-day period.

The list does not include Serse Cosmi's resignation from Livorno on 24 January 2010, as it was rejected by the club two days later following a meeting between Cosmi and club chairman Aldo Spinelli, with no competitive game scheduled in between the short vacancy period.

== League table ==
Pos	Team	Pld	W	D	L	GF	GA	GD	Pts	Qualification or relegation
1	Internazionale (C)	38	24	10	4	75	34	+41	82	Qualification to Champions League group stage
2	Roma	38	24	8	6	68	41	+27	80	Qualification to Champions League group stage
3	Milan	38	20	10	8	60	39	+21	70	Qualification to Champions League group stage
4	Sampdoria	38	19	10	9	49	41	+8	67	Qualification to Champions League play-off round
5	Palermo	38	18	11	9	59	47	+12	65	Qualification to Europa League play-off round
6	Napoli	38	15	14	9	50	43	+7	59	Qualification to Europa League play-off round
7	Juventus	38	16	7	15	55	56	−1	55	Qualification to Europa League third qualifying round
8	Parma	38	14	10	14	46	51	−5	52	
9	Genoa	38	14	9	15	57	61	−4	51	
10	Bari	38	13	11	14	49	49	0	50	
11	Fiorentina	38	13	8	17	48	47	+1	47	
12	Lazio	38	11	13	14	39	43	−4	46	
13	Catania	38	10	15	13	44	45	−1	45	
14	Chievo	38	12	8	18	37	42	−5	44 (Note: Chievo finished ahead of Udinese and Cagliari on head-to-head points: Chievo: 8 pts, Udinese: 6 pts, Cagliari: 1 pts.)	
15	Udinese	38	11	11	16	54	59	−5	44	
16	Cagliari	38	11	11	16	56	58	−2	44	
17	Bologna	38	10	12	16	42	55	−13	42	
18	Atalanta (R)	38	9	8	21	37	53	−16	35	Relegation to Serie B
19	Siena (R)	38	7	10	21	40	67	−27	31	Relegation to Serie B
20	Livorno (R)	38	7	8	23	27	61	−34	29	Relegation to Serie B

Source: Lega Calcio and Yahoo! Sport
Rules for classification: 1) points; 2) head-to-head points; 3) head-to-head goal difference; 4) head-to-head goals scored; 5) goal difference; 6) number of goals scored.
(C) Champions; (R) Relegated

== Results ==
Home \ Away	ATA	BAR	BOL	CAG	CTN	CHV	FIO	GEN	INT	JUV	LAZ	LIV	MIL	NAP	PAL	PAR	ROM	SAM	SIE	UDI
Atalanta		1–0	1–1	3–1	0–0	0–1	2–1	0–1	1–1	2–5	3–0	3–0	1–1	0–2	1–2	3–1	1–2	0–1	2–0	0–0
Bari	4–1		0–0	0–1	0–0	1–0	2–0	3–0	2–2	3–1	2–0	1–0	0–2	1–2	4–2	1–1	0–1	2–1	2–1	2–0
Bologna	2–2	2–1		0–1	1–1	0–2	1–1	1–3	1–3	1–2	2–3	2–0	0–0	2–1	3–1	2–1	0–2	1–1	2–1	2–1
Cagliari	3–0	3–1	1–1		2–2	1–2	2–2	3–2	1–2	2–0	0–2	3–0	2–3	3–3	2–2	2–0	2–2	2–0	1–3	2–2
Catania	0–0	4–0	1–0	2–1		1–2	1–0	1–0	3–1	1–1	1–1	0–1	0–2	0–0	2–0	3–0	1–1	1–2	2–2	1–1
Chievo	1–1	1–2	1–1	2–1	1–1		2–1	3–1	0–1	1–0	1–2	2–0	1–2	1–2	1–0	0–0	0–2	1–2	0–1	1–1
Fiorentina	2–0	2–1	1–2	1–0	3–1	0–2		3–0	2–2	1–2	0–0	2–1	1–2	0–1	1–0	2–3	0–1	2–0	1–1	4–1
Genoa	2–0	1–1	3–4	5–3	2–0	1–0	2–1		0–5	2–2	1–2	1–1	1–0	4–1	2–2	2–2	3–2	3–0	4–2	3–0
Internazionale	3–1	1–1	3–0	3–0	2–1	4–3	1–0	0–0		2–0	1–0	3–0	2–0	3–1	5–3	2–0	1–1	0–0	4–3	2–1
Juventus	2–1	3–0	1–1	1–0	1–2	1–0	1–1	3–2	2–1		1–1	2–0	0–3	2–3	0–2	2–3	1–2	5–1	3–3	1–0
Lazio	1–0	0–2	0–0	0–1	0–1	1–1	1–1	1–0	0–2	0–2		4–1	1–2	1–1	1–1	1–2	1–2	1–1	2–0	3–1
Livorno	1–0	1–1	0–1	0–0	3–1	0–2	0–1	2–1	0–2	1–1	1–2		0–0	0–2	1–2	2–1	3–3	3–1	1–2	0–2
Milan	3–1	0–0	1–0	4–3	2–2	1–0	1–0	5–2	0–4	3–0	1–1	1–1		1–1	0–2	2–0	2–1	3–0	4–0	3–2
Napoli	2–0	3–2	2–1	0–0	1–0	2–0	1–3	0–0	0–0	3–1	0–0	3–1	2–2		0–0	2–3	2–2	1–0	2–1	0–0
Palermo	1–0	1–1	3–1	2–1	1–1	3–1	3–0	0–0	1–1	2–0	3–1	1–0	3–1	2–1		2–1	3–3	1–1	1–0	1–0
Parma	1–0	2–0	2–1	0–2	2–1	2–0	1–1	2–3	1–1	1–2	0–2	4–1	1–0	1–1	1–0		1–2	1–0	1–0	0–0
Roma	2–1	3–1	2–1	2–1	1–0	1–0	3–1	3–0	2–1	1–3	1–0	0–1	0–0	2–1	4–1	2–0		1–2	2–1	4–2
Sampdoria	2–0	0–0	4–1	1–1	1–1	2–1	2–0	1–0	1–0	1–0	2–1	2–0	2–1	1–0	1–1	1–1	0–0		4–1	3–1
Siena	0–2	3–2	1–0	1–1	3–2	0–0	1–5	0–0	0–1	0–1	1–1	0–0	1–2	0–0	1–2	1–1	1–2	1–2		2–1
Udinese	1–3	3–3	1–1	2–1	4–2	0–0	0–1	2–0	2–3	3–0	1–1	2–0	1–0	3–1	3–2	2–2	2–1	2–3	4–1	

Source: gazzetta.it
Legend: Blue = home team win; Yellow = draw; Red = away team win.

== Top goalscorers ==
Rank	Player	Club	Goals
1	(Italy) Antonio Di Natale	Udinese	29
2	(Argentina) Diego Milito	Internazionale	22
3	(Italy) Fabrizio Miccoli	Palermo	19
3	(Italy) Giampaolo Pazzini	Sampdoria	19
5	(Italy) Alberto Gilardino	Fiorentina	15
6	(Brazil) Barreto	Bari	14
6	(Italy) Marco Borriello	Milan	14
6	(Italy) Francesco Totti	Roma	14
6	(Montenegro) Mirko Vučinić	Roma	14
10	(Uruguay) Edinson Cavani	Palermo	13
10	(Italy) Alessandro Matri	Cagliari	13

== Awards ==
The 2009–10 Serie A season concluded with historical individual achievements, heavily dominated by Inter Milan after winning the continental treble.

=== Individual Awards ===
The official awards organized by the Italian Footballers' Association (AIC) for the 2009–10 season were as follows:

Award	Winner	Club	Nationality
Serie A Footballer of the Year	(Argentina) Diego Milito	Inter Milan	Argentine
Best Foreign Footballer	(Argentina) Diego Milito	Inter Milan	Argentine
Best Italian Footballer	(Italy) Antonio Di Natale	Udinese	Italian
Best Goalkeeper	(Brazil) Júlio César	Inter Milan	Brazilian
Best Defender (Shared)	(Italy) Giorgio Chiellini	Juventus	Italian
Best Defender (Shared)	(Argentina) Walter Samuel	Inter Milan	Argentine
Best Young Footballer	(Argentina) Javier Pastore	Palermo	Argentine
Best Coach	(Portugal) José Mourinho	Inter Milan	Portuguese
Best Referee	(Italy) Emidio Morganti	—	Italian
Serie A Top Scorer (Capocannoniere)	(Italy) Antonio Di Natale (29 goals)	Udinese	Italian

Team of the Year
Goalkeeper	(Italy) Marco Storari (Sampdoria)			
Defenders	(Brazil) Maicon (Inter Milan)	(Brazil) Lúcio (Inter Milan)	(Italy) Alessandro Nesta (Milan)	(Argentina) Javier Zanetti (Inter Milan)
Midfielders	(Italy) Angelo Palombo (Sampdoria)		(Netherlands) Wesley Sneijder (Inter Milan)	(Italy) Andrea Cossu (Cagliari)
Forwards	(Italy) Antonio Di Natale (Udinese)		(Argentina) Diego Milito (Inter Milan)	(Italy) Fabrizio Miccoli (Palermo)

== Attendances ==
#	Club	Avg. attendance	Highest
1	Internazionale	56,195	80,018
2	AC Milan	42,809	78,467
3	AS Roma	40,975	61,898
4	SSC Napoli	40,797	56,211
5	SS Lazio	36,154	61,615
6	ACF Fiorentina	27,428	38,389
7	Genoa CFC	25,585	33,265
8	AS Bari	25,391	51,943
9	UC Sampdoria	25,240	34,494
10	US Città di Palermo	25,017	35,872
11	Juventus FC	22,924	25,779
12	Bologna FC	19,470	33,067
13	Udinese Calcio	17,356	23,874
14	Parma FC	17,061	21,323
15	Calcio Catania	15,342	20,941
16	Cagliari Calcio	14,649	23,000
17	Atalanta BC	12,914	20,764
18	ChievoVerona	11,922	28,136
19	AC Siena	11,241	15,373
20	AS Livorno Calcio	10,668	15,982
