= Ezio Capuano =

Italian football coach

Eziolino Capuano
Personal information
- Date of birth: 19 January 1965 (age 61)
- Place of birth: Salerno, Italy

Managerial career
- Years: Team
- 1988–1989: Pro Ebolitana
- 1992–1993: Poseidon AICS
- 1993–1994: Cavese
- 1995–1996: Altamura
- 1996–1999: Cavese
- 1999–2000: Trapani
- 2000–2001: Puteolana
- 2001–2002: Taranto
- 2002–2003: Nocerina
- 2003–2005: Sora
- 2005–2006: San Paolo Altamura
- 2006–2008: Juve Stabia
- 2008–2009: Paganese
- 2009: Potenza
- 2009–2010: Potenza
- 2010: Messina
- 2010: Eupen
- 2010–2011: Paganese
- 2012: Fondi
- 2013: Casertana
- 2014–2016: Arezzo
- 2016–2017: Modena
- 2017–2018: Sambenedettese
- 2019: Rieti
- 2019–2020: Avellino
- 2020: Foggia
- 2020–2021: Potenza
- 2021: ACR Messina
- 2022–2024: Taranto
- 2024: Foggia
- 2024–2025: Trapani
- 2025–2026: Giugliano

Ezio "Eziolino" Capuano (born 19 January 1965) is an Italian football coach.

== Career ==
=== Coach ===
Capuano is a head coach with extensive experience in the lower ranks of Italian football, all from and below the third tier, mostly in Southern Italy. He started his football activity as coach since the age of 20.

In September 2010, he was named the new head coach of bottom-placed Belgian top-flight club Eupen, with no points in the first five games under the guidance of Capuano's predecessor. In his debut in charge of the club, Capuano guided Eupen to a 0–0 away draw to Zulte Waregem, the first point in top-flight history for the club. This was followed by a home loss at the hands of Germinal Beerschot and a sound 4–0 defeat at Club Brugge's home. On 24 September, Capuano and his whole coaching staff announced their immediate resignation from the club. On 1 November he was announced as new head coach of Lega Pro Prima Divisione side Paganese, a club he had already managed during the 2008–09 season.

He has been the head coach of Fondi, since 17 January 2012 until 18 December 2012, when he resigned.

In July 2013, he was introduced as the new head coach of the newly promoted Lega Pro Seconda Divisione club Casertana. However, his time at Casertana was relatively short-lived, as he was fired after only three games in charge.

Capuano returned to management in June 2014 as the new head coach of Arezzo; the club, originally scheduled to play in the amateur Serie D league at the time of Capuano's appointment, was then admitted to Lega Pro to fill a vacancy. He guided the team to safety in its first season, with a squad mainly composed of loans and emergency signings, and was offered a two-year extension by the end of the season.

Capuano's second Arezzo season brought him into the public spotlight due to several events, mostly stemming from the exclusion of Nicolò Sperotto from the squad after he recorded Capuano's angry rant following a loss to an amateur team in a midweek friendly game. Capuano himself was fired on 17 April 2016 after a seven-game winless streak and a falling out with the board, despite the team being in a safe league table position.

On 28 November 2016, Capuano returned to management as head coach of Lega Pro club Modena in place of Simone Pavan. Following a positive start to his coaching stint, with Modena finally out of the relegation play-off zone, he accepted a one-year contract extension in March 2017. On 6 November, Modena was officially excluded from the league and dissolved after failing to attended four consecutive matches due to financial irregularities; all staff were subsequently released.

On 10 November 2017, he was hired as the head coach of Serie C club Sambenedettese. He was dismissed from his coaching post on 29 April 2018, after a 0–1 home loss to AlbinoLeffe, with the team in second place in the league table with only one game to go.

He returned to management on 8 January 2019 as head coach of newly promoted Serie C club Rieti, successfully saving the team from relegation by achieving 24 points in his 17 games in charge. He left the club by mutual consent at the end of the season.

On 16 October 2019, he was hired by Serie C club Avellino. After leading the club to a spot in the promotion playoffs, then lost to Ternana, he was sacked on 7 July 2020.

On 2 September 2020 he was announced as the new head coach of Foggia, following the club's readmission to Serie C, a position he left just a few weeks later on 28 September. On 3 November 2020, he was announced as Mario Somma's replacement at the helm of Potenza, marking his return in charge of the club after ten years. He was sacked on 4 February 2021 following a string of negative results that left Potenza in the relegation playoff zone.

On 11 October 2021, Capuano took over as the new head coach of Serie C club ACR Messina, replacing Salvatore Sullo. He was, however, sacked only two months later, on 15 December, due to negative results.

On 12 September 2022, Capuano took over at Serie C club Taranto, replacing Nello Di Costanzo. After guiding Taranto to safety by the end of the season, he signed a three-year contract extension to keep him in charge of the club until 30 June 2026. In his second season, despite a four-point deduction, Capuano guided Taranto to fourth place in the league table and reached the promotion playoffs, eventually losing to Vicenza.

On 16 August 2024, following a series of events that led to the resignation of Taranto's chairman and a complete shakeup of the squad and board of directors due to financial issues, Capuano and his assistant, Cosimo Zangla, were sacked from their posts. Just a month later, on 27 September 2024, Capuano signed a contract until the end of the season with Foggia, thus returning in charge of the Satanelli four years after his previous experience with the club. His second stint at Foggia lasted however only one month, as Capuano tended his resignations on 27 October 2024 immediately after a shocking 1–2 injury time loss to Sorrento, formally confirming them the next day.

Just a few weeks later, on 11 December 2024, Capuano was hired to replace Salvatore Aronica in charge of fellow Serie C club Trapani. His stint lasted just over a month, as he was dismissed on 28 January 2025, the club citing inappropriate conduct toward the squad as the reason for it.

On 24 October 2025, Capuano was unveiled as the new head coach of Serie C club Giugliano, signing a contract until the end of the season, with an option to extend for one further year. On 19 January 2026, Capuano was dismissed from Giugliano, leaving the club at the bottom of the league table.

== Honours ==
Altamura

- Serie D: 1995–96 (Group H)

Cavese

- Serie D: 1996–97 (Group G)
