= Silvio Baldini =

Italian football manager (born 1958)

Personal information
- Date of birth: 11 September 1958 (age 68)
- Place of birth: Massa, Italy

Team information
- Current team: Italy U21 (head coach)

Managerial career
- Years: Team
- 1984–1988: Bagnone
- 1989–1991: Forte dei Marmi
- 1991–1992: Viareggio
- 1992–1993: Massese
- 1993–1995: Siena
- 1995–1997: Carrarese
- 1997–1998: Chievo Verona
- 1998–1999: Brescia
- 1999–2003: Empoli
- 2003–2004: Palermo
- 2004: Parma
- 2005–2006: Lecce
- 2007–2008: Catania
- 2008–2009: Empoli
- 2011: Vicenza
- 2017–2021: Carrarese
- 2021–2022: Palermo
- 2022: Perugia
- 2024: Crotone
- 2024–2025: Pescara
- 2025–: Italy U21
- 2026: Italy (caretaker)

Silvio Baldini (born 11 September 1958) is an Italian professional football manager who is head coach of the Italy national under-21 team.

== Career ==
=== Early years ===
Born in Massa but hailing from nearby Carrara, Baldini started his coaching career in 1984 at the age of 26 with Bagnone, an amateur Seconda Categoria team, which he led to immediate promotion in his debut year. In 1988, he became assistant coach of Massese. In 1989, he was appointed at the helm of the Promozione team Forte dei Marmi, which he led to promotion in 1991. After a single season with Viareggio, he finally obtained a professional coaching license and returned to Massese, this time as head coach, in 1992. Following that experience, he served as head coach for Serie C1 clubs Siena (1993–1995) and Carrarese (1995–1997).

=== Chievo and Brescia ===
In 1997, Baldini was chosen to fill the Chievo Verona head coaching position on what was his first Serie B job, leading the gialloblu to a final seventh place in the league table. He then moved next year to Brescia in 1998.

=== Empoli ===
In 1999, he moved back to his native Tuscany as the new head coach of Serie B club Empoli. In 2002, Empoli finished fourth in the league, and the team was promoted to Serie A. In his Serie A debut year, Baldini led Empoli, widely tipped for relegation, to an impressive 12th place in the Italian top flight.

=== Palermo ===
Baldini's successes at Empoli led to interest from the ambitious Serie B club Palermo, which was acquired by Maurizio Zamparini just one year earlier. Assigned to guide the Rosanero to immediate promotion to Serie A, Baldini was given a squad including star players such as Luca Toni or Gianluca Berti (which he brought with him from his experience at Empoli). In January 2004, following a 1–3 home defeat to Salernitana, Baldini criticized his chairman Zamparini for his words regarding the team's recent performances; he was subsequently fired, leaving Palermo in third place, and replaced by Francesco Guidolin who eventually guided the Sicilians to win the league title.

=== Serie A years: Parma and Lecce ===
Baldini returned to coaching in the 2004–05 season with Parma, being appointed in September to replace Cesare Prandelli; however, he was sacked himself in December 2004, leaving his side in second-last place in the Serie A table. In September 2005, he was appointed as Lecce head coach but was fired again in January 2006.

=== Catania ===
In June 2007, he returned to Sicily after being named the new Catania head coach. On 26 August 2007, during the first league match, Baldini kicked the behind of Parma boss Domenico Di Carlo after being sent off and having engaged in a dispute with his opponent head coach. He consequently received a one-month ban due to his unprofessional behaviour. During his ban period, assistant coach Gianluca Atzori served at his place during games.

After a hard-fought match against Inter (nevertheless losing 2–0), Baldini switched from his traditional 4-2-3-1 to a more practical 4-3-3 to better suit Catania's needs. In his first two successive matches since Inter, Catania played an honourable match against Fiorentina despite losing 0–1 to the Viola. In the next game, Catania achieved its first league victory, defeating relegation rival Empoli 1–0 thanks to a goal from Martinez. On 30 September, his Catania side held Milan to an impressive 1–1 draw at the San Siro. He will return to the Catania bench against Livorno.

Despite criticism, Baldini initially managed to achieve a better league position than his predecessor Pasquale Marino and also led his side to a historical qualification in the Coppa Italia 2007–08 semi-finals. However, a row of poor results quickly pushed Catania down to 18th place, being potentially relegated as of Week 31, and with only three points ahead of last-placed Empoli, persuading Baldini to resign from his post on 31 March 2008.

=== Return to Empoli and Vicenza ===
In July 2008, he agreed to return to Empoli, accepting the managerial role for the freshly relegated Tuscan side in their 2008–09 Serie B campaign. He was, however, dismissed from his coaching post after failing to guide Empoli back to the top flight, following an unimpressive fifth place in the regular season and a successive defeat to Baldini's former club Brescia in the promotion playoff semi-finals. After his farewell to Empoli, he left active football and worked as a pundit for the sports channel Sportitalia. On 13 June 2011, he was officially announced as the new head coach of Serie B club Vicenza, signing a one-year contract with the Venetian club, but on 4 October 2011, he was sacked. and replaced by Gigi Cagni.

=== Return to Carrarese ===
In June 2017, after six years without a club, Baldini accepted an offer to return to Carrarese; as part of the deal, he notably requested not to receive a salary. After almost four years in charge of Carrarese, during which he consistently led the club to reaching the promotion playoffs, most prominently being eliminated in the semifinals by Bari in the 2019–20 season, Baldini resigned on 10 April 2021, following a fifth consecutive defeat in the Serie C league at the hands of AlbinoLeffe.

=== Return to Palermo ===
On 24 December 2021, Baldini signed a contract until the end of the season with Serie C club Palermo, returning in charge of the Rosanero after his short-lived experience in the 2003–04 season. Under his tenure, Baldini successfully turned the club's fortunes, also becoming a fan favourite due to his temper and his attitude toward the city, as well as changing the playing style into a more attacking one, making room for players such as Matteo Brunori (who eventually ended up becoming the top goalscorer in all Italian professional leagues with 29 goals) to shine. Palermo completed the 2021–22 Serie C Group C regular season in third place, thus qualifying to the promotion playoffs, where they defeated Triestina, Virtus Entella and Feralpisalò in the process, with all home games being attended by about 35,000 people, a stark change to the rest of the season.

On 12 June 2022, following a 1–0 home win against Padova at a sold-out Stadio Renzo Barbera, Baldini's Palermo won the promotion playoffs and promotion to Serie B. On 27 July 2022, a few weeks after Palermo's promotion to Serie B and a club takeover by City Football Group, Baldini and director of football Renzo Castagnini announced their resignations from their respective roles at the club due to disagreements with the board. For his winning tenure as Palermo coach, in February 2023 Baldini was awarded the Golden Bench for best Serie C coach, a trophy he donated to the Palermo Museum shortly afterward.

=== Later years ===
On 20 September 2022, Baldini returned to management as the new head coach of Serie B club Perugia, replacing Fabrizio Castori. On 16 October 2022, following a 1–2 home loss against Südtirol, the third consecutive in all games in charge, Baldini announced his resignation with immediate effect. On 20 February 2024, Baldini agreed to join Serie C club Crotone as their new head coach until the end of the season. He resigned just a month later, on 21 March, after suffering four defeats in his five games in charge of Crotone.

In July 2024, Baldini was hired as the new head coach of Serie C club Pescara. After guiding Pescara to fourth place in the league, Baldini eventually led the club to win the promotion playoff tournament, bringing them back to Serie B after four years; this was the second playoff tournament win for Baldini. A few days later, Baldini announced his resignations from the post, citing family reasons. On 17 July 2025, Baldini was unveiled as the new head coach of the Italy U21, with Andrea Barzagli as his assistant.

On 10 April 2026, a week after Italy senior team failed to qualify for the 2026 FIFA World Cup and coach Gennaro Gattuso’s resignation, Baldini was named caretaker manager for Italy’s June friendlies. As a statement on the state of youth development in Italy, he announced that he intended to only call up U21-players for his first matches. The following call-up consisted of a single player above the age of 22, namely goalkeeper Gianluigi Donnarumma. The decision was later criticized by Italy's opponents, Greece.

== Managerial statistics ==
As of match played 16 October 2022

Managerial record by team and tenure
Team	From	To	Record							
Team	From	To	G	W	D	L	GF	GA	GD	Win %
Forte dei Marmi	1 July 1989	30 June 1991	64	27	27	10	74	42	+32	42.19
Viareggio	1 July 1991	30 June 1992	42	12	18	12	44	36	+8	28.57
Massese	1 July 1992	30 June 1993	40	13	14	13	41	45	−4	32.50
Siena	1 July 1993	30 June 1995	76	22	29	25	80	69	+11	28.95
Carrarese	1 July 1995	30 June 1997	78	26	30	22	73	67	+6	33.33
Chievo Verona	17 July 1997	30 June 1998	40	12	15	13	44	48	−4	30.00
Brescia	1 July 1998	30 June 1999	42	17	14	11	52	38	+14	40.48
Empoli	30 November 1999	25 May 2003	150	62	43	45	209	179	+30	41.33
Palermo	17 June 2003	26 January 2004	29	13	10	6	39	24	+15	44.83
Parma	17 June 2004	13 December 2004	21	4	7	10	20	32	−12	19.05
Lecce	27 September 2005	23 January 2006	16	3	3	10	13	27	−14	18.75
Catania	4 June 2007	31 March 2008	36	8	13	15	32	44	−12	22.22
Empoli	27 May 2008	16 June 2009	48	21	14	13	60	50	+10	43.75
Vicenza	13 June 2011	6 October 2011	9	0	3	6	7	16	−9	0.00
Carrarese	20 June 2017	11 April 2021	153	61	39	53	228	195	+33	39.87
Palermo	24 December 2021	27 July 2022	25	15	8	2	52	24	+28	60.00
Perugia	20 September 2022	16 October 2022	3	0	0	3	2	6	−4	0.00
Total			872	316	287	269	1,070	942	+128	36.24

== Honours ==
=== Manager ===
Individual:

- Golden Bench – Serie C: 2021–22
