= Salvatore Campilongo =

Italian footballer and manager

Personal information
- Date of birth: 1 August 1961 (age 65)
- Place of birth: Naples, Italy
- Height: 1.76 m (5 ft 9 in)
- Position: Striker

Team information
- Current team: Lamezia Terme (head coach)

Senior career*
Years	Team	Apps	(Gls)
1979–1980	Juve Stabia	2	(0)
1980	Lazio	2	(0)
1980–1981	Avellino	1	(0)
1981–1983	Empoli	18	(2)
1983–1984	Mantova	22	(5)
1984–1985	Campania Puteolana	21	(0)
1985–1986	Frattese	24	(11)
1986–1987	Campania Puteolana	24	(6)
1987–1988	Salernitana	32	(4)
1988–1989	Brindisi	28	(9)
1989–1992	Casertana	98	(41)
1992–1994	Venezia	51	(14)
1994–1995	Palermo	25	(9)
1995–1996	Turris	19	(5)
1996	Avellino	8	(3)
1996–1998	Frosinone	49	(22)
1998–2000	Giugliano	32	(10)

Managerial career
- 2002–2003: Casertana
- 2003–2004: Ariano Irpino
- 2004–2007: Cavese
- 2007–2008: Foggia
- 2008–2009: Avellino
- 2009–2010: Empoli
- 2011: Frosinone
- 2012: Nocerina
- 2012–2014: Ischia
- 2014: Rimini
- 2014–2015: Casertana
- 2015–2016: Taranto
- 2017: Vibonese
- 2018–2019: Savoia
- 2019–2020: Cavese
- 2020–2021: Cavese
- 2021–: Lamezia Terme
- * Club domestic league appearances and goals

Salvatore "Sasà" Campilongo (born 1 August 1961) is an Italian football manager and a former striker. He is currently managing Lamezia Terme in the Serie D league.

== Playing career ==
Born in Naples, Campilongo started his career with Juve Stabia, then joining Lazio in 1980 and making his Serie A debut on 4 May 1980 with the biancazzurri jersey. He successively played another Serie A season, this time with Avellino, in 1980–1981 with little success. He then went on to play for lower league teams from Serie C1, Serie C2 and Interregionale. He then returned into high level football with Casertana, being a protagonist of the rossoblu's promotion to Serie B. He then spent his later years with Venezia in Serie B, Palermo in Serie C1, and more Serie C teams from Campania and Lazio before to retire in 2000.

== Coaching career ==
In 2002 Campilongo was appointed head coach of Casertana in Serie D. In 2004, he went on to become Cavese boss, leading the Campanian team from Serie C2 to a narrowly missed promotion to Serie B. In 2007, he left Cavese to join Serie C1 promotion hopefuls Foggia, only to be fired a few months later by the satanelli management. In October 2008, Serie B low-table club Avellino appointed Campilongo as new head coach; in his first weeks with the biancoverdi, Campilongo led his new club to reviving, impressive results. However, financial troubles which ultimately led to the exclusion of Avellino from professional football in the summer 2009 prevented the team from ultimately escaping relegation, and the biancoverdi completed the league season in 21st place.

In July 2009 Campilongo was appointed at the helm of ambitious Tuscan outfit Empoli, a team he was part of as a player from 1981 to 1983, with the aim to guide his new club back into the top flight.

On 8 January 2011, he was named new head coach of relegation-threatened Frosinone, taking over from Guido Carboni.

On 7 January 2012, Campilongo was named new head coach of relegation-threatened Nocerina, taking over from Gaetano Auteri, until 23 January 2012 when he rescinds the contract by mutual agreement with the company after two defeats in as many races and the last place in the ranking.

On 6 July 2012, he was named new coach of Ischia in Serie D; in January 2014 he was sacked from Ischia.

On 2 July 2014, he signed to Rimini in Serie D but about two months later, before the season, he rescinded the contract by mutual consent. On 24 November 2014, he became coach of Casertana. In November 2015 he became coach of Taranto, but after about two months, is relieved. On 8 January 2017, he was appointed coach of Vibonese.

On 17 September 2019, he returned to Cavese in Serie C. He left Cavese at the end of the 2019–20 season. He returned at Cavese on 28 December 2020. He was sacked on 4 April 2021 after failing to overturn the club's fortunes, leaving Cavese at the bottom of the Serie C league table.

On 14 December 2021, he took over the reins of Serie D club Lamezia Terme.
