= Sandro Salvioni =

Italian footballer and manager

Personal information
- Full name: Valter Alessandro Salvioni
- Date of birth: 8 October 1953 (age 73)
- Place of birth: Gorlago, Italy
- Height: 1.75 m (5 ft 9 in)
- Position: Midfielder

Youth career
- Leffe

Senior career*
Years	Team	Apps	(Gls)
1972–1973	Leffe	?	(?)
1973–1975	Seregno	42	(2)
1975–1976	Novara	39	(2)
1976–1979	Foggia	63	(4)
1979–1984	Brescia	150	(10)
1984–1985	Derthona	28	(0)
1985–1986	Parma	25	(0)
1986–1987	Parma	32	(2)
1987–1989	Parma	61	(1)
1989–1990	Seregno	?	(?)

Managerial career
- 1989–1991: Seregno
- 1991–1992: Crema
- 1992–1993: Vastese
- 2000–2002: Nice
- 2002–2003: Cosenza
- 2003–2004: Verona
- 2006: Lumezzane
- 2007: Calcio Caravaggese
- 2009–2010: Ancona
- 2010–2011: Triestina
- 2012: AlbinoLeffe
- 2013: Lugano
- 2016: Monza
- * Club domestic league appearances and goals

Valter Alessandro Salvioni (born 8 October 1953), best known as Sandro Salvioni, is an Italian football manager, and a former player, last in charge as head coach of Lugano.

== Career ==
=== Playing career ===
Salvioni mostly played into lower ranks of Italian football, excluding a two-year stint with then-Serie A club Foggia and a lone season with Brescia.

=== Coaching career ===
Salvioni started his coaching career in 1989 with Serie D club Seregno which he later to join Crema in 1991. In 1993, he made his debut as professional coach with Vastese in the Serie C2 league. From 1994 to 2000 he then served as youth coach of Parma; in June 2000 he was then appointed by Franco Sensi to take over as head coach of French Ligue 2 club Nice, who was acquired by the Roma chairman as a satellite club for the giallorossi. In his second and final season in charge, he guided the French outfit to promotion into the top flight. In 2002, he agreed a return to Italy in order to become new head coach of Serie B club Cosenza, with little success; this was followed by another unsuccessful Serie B period with Verona. After two short spells with minor league teams Lumezzane and Calcio Caravaggese, he took over from Francesco Monaco as head coach of Ancona in May 2009, guiding the small club to escape relegation in the 2008–09 season and a mid-table placement in the following 2009–10 season. However, Salvioni found himself again without a job in July 2010 due to Ancona's exclusion from Italian football.

In December 2010 he became the new head coach of Triestina, as of the start of winter break, the team finished as the bottom with 17 points.

On 28 January 2012, he was appointed new head coach of Serie B club AlbinoLeffe, in an attempt to save the small club from relegation. He was removed from his position on 7 April 2012 due to poor results. He then briefly served as head coach of Monza between January and March 2016.
