= Vincenzo Chiarenza =

Italian footballer and manager

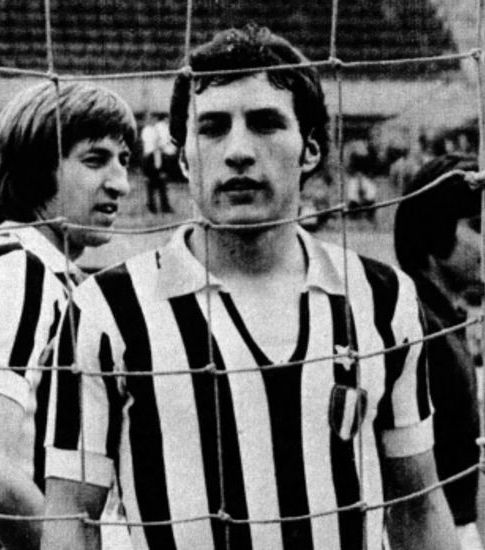
- Chiarenza with Juventus in 1973

Personal information
- Full name: Vincenzo Chiarenza
- Date of birth: 27 September 1954 (age 72)
- Place of birth: Termini Imerese, Italy
- Position: Defender

Team information
- Current team: Como

Youth career
- Juventus

Senior career*
Years	Team	Apps	(Gls)
1973–1974	Sampdoria	14	(1)
1974–1975	Brindisi	34	(4)
1975–1977	Atalanta	39	(6)
1977–1978	Avellino	31	(6)
1978–1979	Atalanta	10	(0)
1979–1980	Bari	37	(3)
1980–1981	Taranto	35	(1)
1981–1982	Lazio	42	(0)
1982–1983	Udinese	16	(0)
1983	Lazio	3	(0)
1983–1985	Triestina	60	(0)
1985–1987	Taranto	22	(0)
1987–1988	Legnano	18	(0)
1988–1989	Novara	26	(1)

Managerial career
- 2008: Ascoli
- 2010: Sanremese
- 2012: Como
- * Club domestic league appearances and goals

Vincenzo Chiarenza (born 27 September 1954) is a former Italian football coach and former player, who played as a defender.

== Career ==
=== Player ===
Chiarenza started his professional playing career in 1973–74 with Sampdoria in the Italian Serie A, then playing mostly at Serie B level with Brindisi, Avellino, Bari, Taranto, Triestina, Atalanta and Lazio. He successively played for Serie C2 teams Legnano and Novara before to retire from active football.

Throughout his career, Chiarenza made a total 43 appearances in the Italian Serie A, also scoring a goal.

=== Manager ===
Chiarenza spent the majority of his coaching career working in the Juventus youth system. In 2003, he succeeded long-serving youth coach Gian Piero Gasperini. He is credited with masterminding the Primavera squad's most successful period in the 2000s and bringing through players such as Antonio Mirante, Raffaele Palladino, Paolo De Ceglie, Domenico Criscito, Sebastian Giovinco and Claudio Marchisio, all of whom have made the first team at some point and the latter three making the senior national team as well. All have been Italian youth internationals and Marchisio, Criscito and Giovinco have broken into the senior team. Under him, the Primavera squad won all competitions in the age group, including the 2005–06 Campionato Nazionale Primavera, the 2006–07 Coppa Italia Primavera, two consecutive Supercoppa Primavera in 2006 and 2007 and winning the 2004-05 Torneo di Viareggio and reaching the final the following year. The Primavera have yet to win the championship since his departure.

In October 2008 he was appointed to his first senior managing role, replacing Nello Di Costanzo as head coach of Serie B club Ascoli. He was however fired only less than two months later due to disagreement with the club president.
