= Gennaro Ruotolo =

Italian former footballer and manager (born 1967)

Personal information
- Date of birth: 20 March 1967 (age 59)
- Place of birth: Santa Maria a Vico, Italy
- Height: 1.76 m (5 ft 9 1/2 in)
- Position: Midfielder

Senior career*
Years	Team	Apps	(Gls)
1984–1986	Sorrento	42	(0)
1986–1988	Arezzo	70	(2)
1988–2002	Genoa	444	(35)
2002–2003	Livorno	31	(1)
2003	Al-Ittihad	10	(0)
2003–2006	Livorno	83	(4)
2006–2007	Sorrento	18	(0)
2007–2008	Massa Lubrense		

International career^{‡}
1991	Italy	1	(0)

Managerial career
- 2009: Livorno (caretaker)
- 2010: Livorno (caretaker)
- 2010: Savona
- 2011–2012: Sorrento
- 2012–2013: Treviso
- 2015–2016: Sangiovannese
- * Club domestic league appearances and goals as of 21 October 2008 ‡ National team caps and goals as of 21 October 2008

Gennaro Ruotolo (Italian: [dʒenˈnaːro ˈrwɔːtolo], Neapolitan: [ˈrwoːtələ]; born 20 March 1967) is an Italian former footballer and manager who played as a midfielder.

== Career ==
=== Playing career ===
Ruotolo started his career with Sorrento in 1984, but is best known for having been a key player for Genoa for over a decade; he joined the Grifone in 1988 to left it only in 2002 to join Livorno of Serie C1. During his spell at Genoa he lifted the 1996 Anglo-Italian Cup. He played for Livorno until 2006, except for a four-months time at Saudi Arabian side Al-Ittihad (February–June 2003), being part of both rosters which gained promotion to Serie B and then Serie A, and playing two top division seasons with the amaranto. He left Livorno in 2006 to join newly promoted Serie C2 club Sorrento in a comeback to his first professional team. He left Sorrento in December 2007 by mutual consent and then joined amateur Promozione side Massa Lubrense for the remainder of the season.

In his playing career, Ruotolo received three call-ups for the Italy national team, all in 1991, with a single appearance, a 2–0 home win against Denmark on 12 June.

=== Managerial career ===
In July 2008, he returned to Livorno, this time as assistant to the newly appointed coach Leonardo Acori.

On 23 May 2009 Ruotolo was appointed on an interim basis to replace Leonardo Acori at the helm of Livorno for the final Serie B league game and the following promotion play-offs in an attempt to bring his side back to the top flight. He debuted with a late 3–2 away win to Ascoli that left his side in third place at the end of the regular season. In the promotion play-offs, Livorno was coupled with Tuscan rivals Grosseto in the semifinals: after a shock 0–2 loss in the first leg, Ruotolo's side managed to make an impressive comeback by defeating their opponent in a 4–1 home win that ensured Livorno a place in the playoff finals against Brescia. In the finals, Ruotolo then managed to guide Livorno to defeat Brescia 5–2 on aggregate, thus marking an immediate Serie A return for the amaranto club. He subsequently accepted an offer from Livonro to become the club's head coach on a permanent basis; however the move was later dismissed by the Italian Football Federation due to Ruotolo lacking the required UEFA Pro coaching badges, and Vittorio Russo was instead appointed as acting head coach, with Ruotolo being however often referred as the "real" Livorno boss.

He was removed from his assistant coach position on 20 October 2009, after a 1–2 home loss to Palermo. In January 2010 he was re-hired by Livorno chairman Aldo Spinelli, this time as new youth coach of the Primavera under-19 squad.

On 5 April 2010 he was reappointed back at the helm of Livorno, taking over from dismissed head coach Serse Cosmi, in a desperate attempt to save the team from relegation. He was this time allowed to act as head coach despite still not having the required coaching badges, thanks to a 60-day derogation from the Italian Football Federation. The attempt was not successful, and Livorno went down to Serie B after only one season in the Italian top flight.

In June 2010 Ruotolo was announced as new head coach of Savona, who will play Lega Pro Seconda Divisione in the 2010–11 season.

On 14 December 2011 Sorrento unveiled Ruotolo as their new manager until the end of the season, after the sacking of previous manager Maurizio Sarri following the 4–0 away defeat to Pro Vercelli. By doing so he returned to the club where he had both begun and ended his playing career and thus reignited his close association with Sorrento and Campania, the region of his birth.

Since 25 October 2012 to the end of the season he has been the coach of Treviso in Lega Pro Prima Divisione, a position he kept until March 2013. He successively served a full season as head coach of Serie D amateurs Sangiovannese in 2015–16.
