= Francesco Monaco (footballer) =

Italian footballer and manager

Personal information
- Date of birth: 6 May 1960 (age 66)
- Place of birth: Latiano, Italy
- Height: 1.67 m (5 ft 6 in)
- Position: Midfielder

Senior career*
Years	Team	Apps	(Gls)
1977–1979	Squinzano	64	(2)
1979–1980	Sampdoria	4	(0)
1980–1981	Novara	31	(0)
1981–1984	Teramo	88	(15)
1984–1986	Lucchese	60	(5)
1986–1987	Lanciano	30	(0)
1987–1995	Lucchese	234	(1)
1995–1997	Forlì	31	(0)

Managerial career
- 2000–2001: Lucchese (assistant)
- 2001–2005: Ascoli (youth)
- 2005–2006: Lanciano
- 2006: Ancona
- 2007–2009: Ancona
- 2009: Potenza
- 2010–2011: Carrarese
- 2011–2012: Piacenza
- 2012–2013: Foligno
- 2014–2015: Piacenza
- 2016: Pro Sesto
- 2016–2017: Prato
- 2018: Fabriano Cerret
- 2019–2020: Lucchese
- 2021: Foligno
- * Club domestic league appearances and goals

Francesco Monaco (born 6 May 1960) is an Italian association football manager and a former player who played as a midfielder.

== Career ==
=== Player ===
Monaco has been a former player in the lower ranks of Italian professional football of Squinzano, Sampdoria, Novara, Teramo, Lucchese, Lanciano and Forlì.

=== Coach ===
Monaco successively entered into a coaching career, serving as assistant coach of Lucchese during the 2000–01 season and then as Ascoli's youth coach until 2005. In July 2005 he took his first head coaching job at Serie C1's Lanciano, then working as head coach of A.C. Ancona from July to December 2006, and again from March 2007 to May 2009, leading the biancorossi to promotion to Serie B in 2008, before being sacked due to poor results in May 2009. His successive coaching experience was at the helm of Potenza on Prima Divisione, where he replaced Ezio Capuano for a bare month (from September to October 2009).

In July 2010 he was appointed new head coach of Lega Pro Seconda Divisione club Carrarese.

In summer 2011 he was appointed new head coach of Lega Pro Prima Divisione club Piacenza until the end of the season.

On 16 October 2012, he was named new coach of Foligno in Lega Pro Seconda Divisione.

On 16 June 2014, he was renamed new coach of Piacenza in Serie D.

In January 2018, he was hired by ASD Fabriano Cerret.

On 30 July 2019, he signed with Lucchese in Serie D. Lucchese was promoted to Serie C after the 2019–20 season. On 23 October 2020, he was dismissed by the club after the team only gained 1 point in the first 6 games of the Serie C season.
