= Luigi Cagni =

Italian former football player

Luigi "Gigi" Cagni
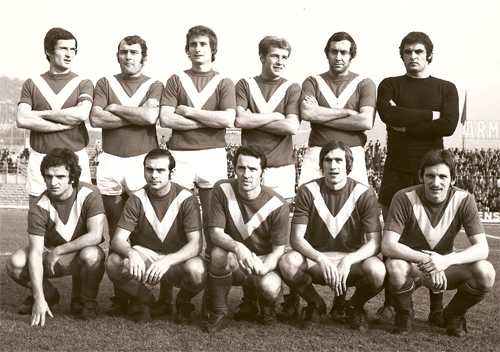
- A formation of Brescia in the 1971-72 championship Cagni is the first in the lower right corner.

Personal information
- Date of birth: 14 June 1950 (age 76)
- Place of birth: Brescia, Italy
- Position: Defender

Senior career*
Years	Team	Apps	(Gls)
1969–1978	Brescia	262	(3)
1978–1987	Sambenedettese	262	(2)
1987–1988	Ospitaletto	8	(0)
Total		532	(5)

Managerial career
- 1988–1989: Brescia (youth team)
- 1989–1990: Centese
- 1990–1996: Piacenza
- 1996–1998: Verona
- 1998–1999: Genoa
- 1999–2000: Salernitana
- 2000–2001: Sampdoria
- 2003–2004: Piacenza
- 2004–2005: Catanzaro
- 2006–2007: Empoli
- 2008: Empoli
- 2008: Parma
- 2011–2012: Vicenza
- 2012: Vicenza
- 2013: Spezia
- 2017: Brescia
- * Club domestic league appearances and goals

Luigi "Gigi" Cagni (born 14 June 1950 in Brescia) is an Italian former football player, who played as a defender. He most recently served head coach of Brescia in the Serie B league in the final weeks of the 2016–17 Serie B season.

== Playing career ==
Cagni made his Serie A debut for Brescia in 1970, in a league match lost 4–0 to Cagliari. He played only eight Serie A matches, but gained a deep experience of Serie B, where he played 483 matches and scored 5 goals. Having played 483 matches in Serie B, he is currently the player with the most appearances in Serie B.

== Managerial career ==
After a season as youth team coach in his home team Brescia, Cagni coached Centese of Serie C2 in 1989–90, and successively signed for Piacenza of Serie C1 in 1990–91, becoming one of the main authors of Piacenza's first appearance in Serie A, in 1993. Cagni stayed at Piacenza until 1996, when he moved to Hellas Verona, again in Serie A. However, Cagni was not able to maintain his team to the top division, and Verona was relegated. Since then, Cagni mostly served for Serie B teams, with the exception of Piacenza, who rehired him in 2002–03, in place of sacked Andrea Agostinelli, in an unsuccessful attempt to avoid relegation.

In January 2006, after the dismissal of Mario Somma, Empoli appointed Cagni as head coach. Under his tenure, the experienced boss was able to lead the team up to tenth place, then become seventh following the Calciopoli scandal. His contract with Empoli was extended in March 2007 for another year, following impressive performances which led the team to fight for and eventually gain a spot in the next UEFA Cup, the first appearance in a continental competition for both the small Tuscan club and Cagni himself. However, a poor start in the Serie A 2007–08, and a UEFA Cup elimination in the first round to Zurich convinced Empoli's management to sack Cagni, appointing Alberto Malesani as his replacement. On 31 March 2008, he was re-called to the helm of Empoli, following the club board's decision to fire Malesani too, but he did not manage to save the club from last matchday relegation. He resigned after the verdict.

On 29 May 2008, it was announced that Cagni signed a two-year contract with Parma and was to coach the club in their first season in Serie B in 18 years. However, on 30 September 2008, he was fired by Parma and replaced by Francesco Guidolin.

On 6 October 2011, he became the new coach of Vicenza in Serie B, in place of the sacked Silvio Baldini. On 4 March 2012, he was sacked; but, on 29 April 2012, he was recalled by Vicenza, but he could not save the team from relegation.

He then served as Walter Zenga's assistant at Sampdoria for a short period at the beginning of the 2015–16 season, being sacked from his position in September 2015.

On 12 March 2017, he was named new head coach of his hometown club Brescia in the Serie B league, taking over from outgoing manager Cristian Brocchi. Under his tenure, he managed to save Brescia from relegation, and left by the end of the season to make room for new head coach Roberto Boscaglia.
