= Vittorio Russo =

Italian footballer and manager

Personal information
- Date of birth: 16 February 1939 (age 87)
- Place of birth: Trieste, Italy
- Position: Defender

Senior career*
Years	Team	Apps	(Gls)
- Sambenedettese
- Pro Gorizia

Managerial career
- Pro Gorizia
- 2005–2006: Triestina
- 2009: Livorno
- * Club domestic league appearances and goals

Vittorio Russo (born 16 February 1939) is an Italian football manager and former player. He last served as head coach of Serie A outfit A.S. Livorno Calcio until October 2009.

== Career ==
Russo was born in Trieste. A defender, he played for Sambenedettese. He started a coaching career, initially as a player-manager, and then focused only on managerial duties. He also guided Pro Gorizia at Serie C2 level before entering the Italian Football Federation as a technician, serving as an assistant to Rossano Giampaglia and Marco Tardelli with the Italy national under-21 football team. In 2005, he joined Triestina to guide the club's Under-19 team, and also guided the Serie B first team on an interim basis, together with general manager Francesco De Falco, from November 2005 to February 2006. He successively served as assistant coach to Walter Mazzarri at Sampdoria during the 2008–09 season.

In July 2009, he was appointed as head coach of newly promoted Serie A side Livorno, after the Italian federation rejected the club's appointment of former assistant Gennaro Ruotolo as permanent manager due to his lack of required coaching badges. Following this, Livorno were forced to look for a head coach with the required UEFA Pro License coaching badges, and Russo was therefore appointed, with Ruotolo appearing as assistant manager to him.

Russo's Livorno spell, however, lasted only a few months, as he and Ruotolo were both sacked on 21 October 2009 due to poor results.
