= Leonardo Acori =

Italian football manager and player (born 1955)

Personal information
- Date of birth: 16 January 1955 (age 71)
- Place of birth: Bastia Umbra, Italy
- Position: Midfielder

Senior career*
Years	Team	Apps	(Gls)
1972–1974	Napoli		
1974–1983	Banco di Roma		

Managerial career
- 1990–1991: Rieti
- 1991–1992: L'Aquila
- 1992–1994: Viterbese
- 1994–1995: Ternana
- 1995–1996: Ladispoli
- 1997–1999: Gubbio
- 1999–2002: Sangiovannese
- 2002–2008: Rimini
- 2008–2009: Livorno
- 2009: Benevento
- 2010: Benevento
- 2010–2011: Cremonese
- 2012–2013: San Marino Calcio
- 2014: Grosseto
- 2014–2015: Gubbio
- 2016: Rimini
- 2016: Prato
- 2018–2019: Rimini
- * Club domestic league appearances and goals

Leonardo Acori (born 16 January 1955) is an Italian football manager and former player, who played as a midfielder.

== Playing career ==
Acori played since 1974 to 1983 in the football team of G.S. Banco di Roma.

== Coaching career ==
Acori's first coaching experience came in 1990, at the helm of Interregionale team Rieti, which he led to a fourth place, then winning the division the next year with L'Aquila. After two seasons with Viterbese (a fourth and a third place), he served as mid-season replacement at Ternana with little fortune, and then trying unsuccessfully to escape relegation with Lazio-based team Ladispoli the following year. In 1997–98 he became head coach of Gubbio, leading them to an immediate Serie D title and a seventh place in the Serie C2 the following season. In 1999, he joined Tuscan side Sangiovannese, leading them to a Serie D title in 1999–2000 and narrowly missing promotion to Serie C1 in 2001–02 after losing the playoff finals to Pro Patria.

In 2002–03 he was appointed as new Rimini boss, leading the biancorossi to a second place in the Serie C2/B, and then winning the promotion playoffs. The next season, he then led Rimini to a fourth place in the Serie C1 round, missing a second consecutive promotion after losing the subsequent promotion playoffs. The promotion however proved just to be delayed as Rimini managed to win the Serie C1/A round the following season, thus ensuring a historical Serie B comeback. He was confirmed at the helm of Rimini with notable fortune, leading also his side to a fifth place in the 2006–2007 Serie B.

On 4 June 2008 he was announced as new Livorno boss, with the aim to lead the amaranto back to Serie A in their 2008–09 Serie B campaign. He was sacked on 23 May 2009 after a 0–1 home loss to AlbinoLeffe in Serie B's Week 41 (with only one weekday remaining), despite having already achieved a spot in the upcoming promotion playoffs, with assistant coach Gennaro Ruotolo replacing him for the remaining league and playoff games.

In June 2009 he was named new head coach of ambitious Lega Pro Prima Divisione club Benevento, but was removed from his head management post later in December due to poor results. He was appointed back at the helm of Benevento later in April 2010 to replace Andrea Camplone, with the aim to qualify his side to a promotion playoff spot with only four games remaining to the end of the regular season.

From 26 October 2010 until he was sacked on 11 April 2011, he was the coach of U.S. Cremonese.

On 2 October 2012 he was named new coach of San Marino Calcio, taking the place of the recently sacked Mario Petrone.
