= Guido Carboni =

Italian footballer and manager

Personal information
- Date of birth: 27 January 1963 (age 63)
- Place of birth: Arezzo, Italy
- Position: Striker

Senior career*
Years	Team	Apps	(Gls)
1980–1982	Arezzo	22	(3)
1982–1983	Benevento	20	(2)
1983–1984	Osimana	24	(4)
1986–1990	Montevarchi	82	(21)
1990–1992	Empoli	59	(13)
1992–1994	Siena	56	(12)
1994–1995	Giorgione	29	(4)
1995–1997	Montevarchi	40	(7)

Managerial career
- 1998–1999: Aglianese
- 1999–2000: Olbia
- 2000–2001: Genoa
- 2001–2002: Pisa
- 2002–2003: Olbia
- 2003–2004: Viterbese
- 2004–2006: Bari
- 2007: Crotone
- 2007–2008: Avellino
- 2009: Rimini
- 2010–2011: Frosinone
- 2011–2012: Empoli
- 2013–2014: Benevento
- 2015–2016: Siena
- 2017: Juve Stabia
- 2018–2019: Olbia
- * Club domestic league appearances and goals

Guido Carboni (born 27 January 1963) is an Italian football manager most recently in charge of Olbia and a former player, who played as a forward.

He is the brother of former Italian international footballer Amedeo Carboni, who also played for Sampdoria, Roma, and Valencia at club level as a defender.

== Career ==
=== Playing career ===
Carboni played mostly with Tuscan Serie C1 and Serie C2 teams throughout his career in the role of striker, marking his professional footballing debut with hometown club Arezzo in 1980. He then played also for Montevarchi, Empoli and Siena, and retired in 1997 to pursue a coaching career.

=== Coaching career ===
Carboni started his coaching career in 1998 with Serie D club Aglianese, leading his side to seventh place in the final standings. In 1999, he left Tuscany to coach Sardinian Serie D side Olbia, ending the season in fourteenth place.

In October 2000, he was surprisingly appointed by Genoa chairman Gianni Scerni to replace Bruno Bolchi at the helm of the rossoblu in the Serie B. Carboni, lacking a valid coaching license for heading a Serie B club, guided the club jointly with veteran manager Alfredo Magni, but was sacked in January 2001 following a poor 17 points in 15 matches.

In 2001-2002, Carboni was appointed at the helm of ambitious Serie C1 side Pisa, but failed to lead the club to a promotion spot, ending the season in a poor tenth place. He returned to Olbia the next season, but obtained an unimpressive fifteenth place in the Serie C2 table and escaped relegation only after the playoffs. In 2003, he moved back to Serie C1, at Viterbese, obtaining a third place and allowing the gialloblu to gain a spot in the promotion playoff.

From 2004 to 2006, Carboni coached Bari in the Serie B, obtaining a twelfth and a thirteenth final place respectively. After Bari replaced him with Rolando Maran during the summer, he started the 2006-07 season without a job, being appointed in February 2007 as the new Crotone boss following the dismissal of Elio Gustinetti in an attempt to avoid relegation, which later proved to be unsuccessful. Following Crotone's relegation to Serie C1, Carboni left the Calabrian side, being later appointed at the helm of newly promoted Serie B side Avellino on 23 August 2007, being the third head coach signed by the biancoverdi in the 2007-08 season following resignations by Giovanni Vavassori and successively Maurizio Sarri, all apparingly caused by disputes with the club management. He was sacked in March 2008 due to poor results.

In April 2009 he was appointed to replace Elvio Selighini at the helm of relegation-battling Serie B side Rimini, however failing to save his team from falling down to the lower tier after being defeated to Ancona in the relegation playoffs.

On 25 April 2010, Frosinone announced that Carboni would be the new manager after a poor string of results led to the sacking of Francesco Moriero, leading the club to safety. A poor start in the 2010–11 campaign however led to Carboni's own dismissal later in January 2011.

On 20 November 2011 Carboni becomes the new coach of Empoli in place of the sacked Giuseppe Pillon, until 12 February 2012 when he was sacked.

On 18 January 2013, he was named new coach of Benevento.

In December 2015, he replaced Gianluca Atzori as manager of Siena.

On 13 November 2018 he was appointed head coach of Serie C club Olbia. He was fired on 7 January 2019 and replaced by Michele Filippi.
