= Francesco Tavano =

Italian footballer

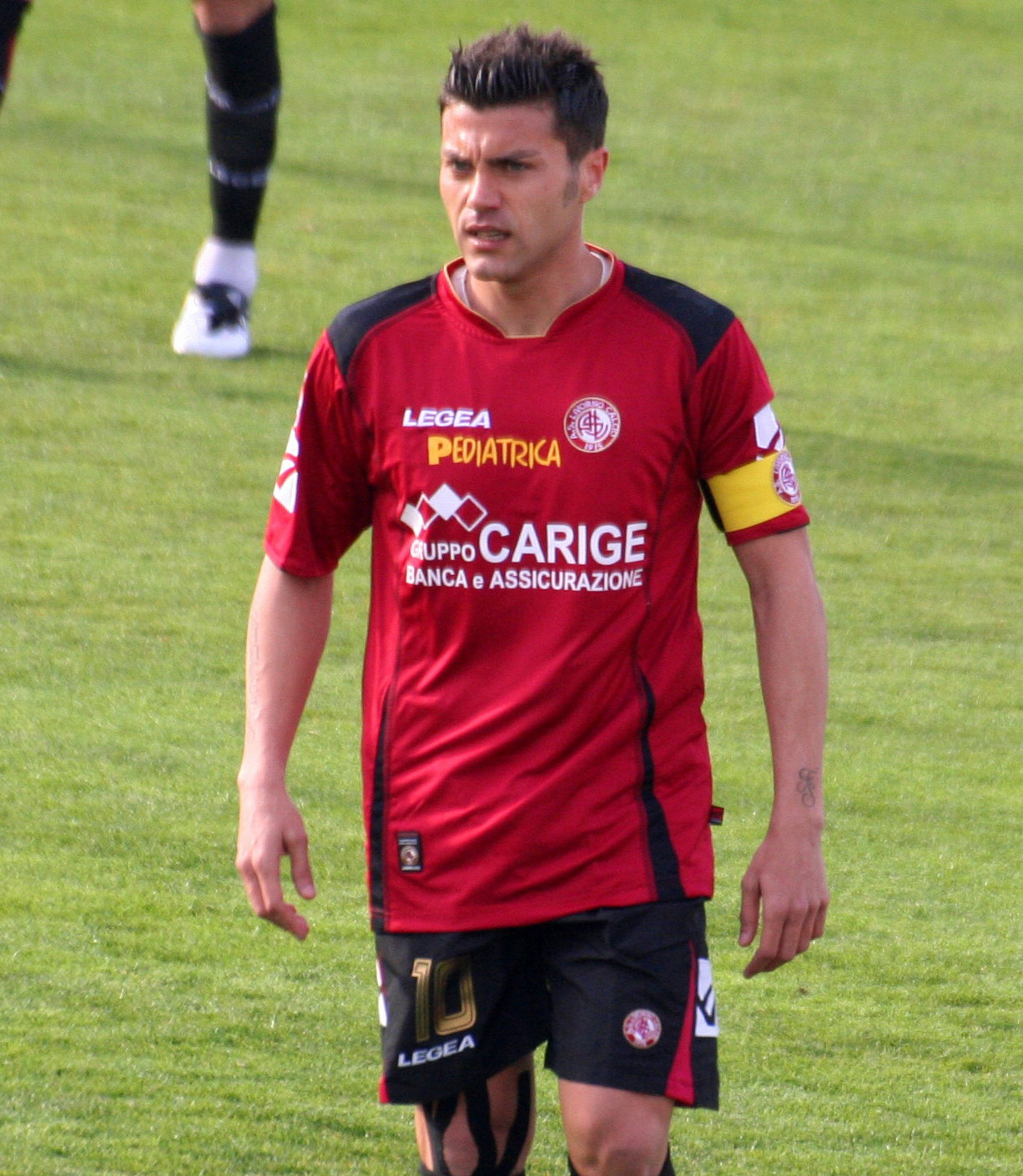
- Tavano with Livorno in 2009

Personal information
- Date of birth: 2 March 1979 (age 47)
- Place of birth: Caserta, Italy
- Height: 1.73 m (5 ft 8 in)
- Position: Striker

Youth career
- –1997: Nola
- 1997–1999: Fiorentina

Senior career*
Years	Team	Apps	(Gls)
1999–2000	Pisa	11	(0)
2000–2001	Rondinella	46	(21)
2001–2006	Empoli	142	(43)
2006–2007	Valencia	3	(0)
2007	→ Roma (loan)	14	(2)
2007–2011	Livorno	128	(48)
2011–2015	Empoli	118	(63)
2015–2016	Avellino	22	(3)
2016–2017	Prato	26	(6)
2017–2020	Carrarese	79	(39)
2020–2021	Prato	27	(11)
2021–2022	Ponsacco	20	(10)
2022	Tuttocuoio	?	(3)

Managerial career
- 2022–2023: Tuttocuoio
- * Club domestic league appearances and goals

Francesco "Ciccio" Tavano (born 2 March 1979) is an Italian football coach and former professional striker.

== Playing career ==
Tavano started his professional career with Pisa before being sold to a minor Florence team, Rondinella, then in Serie C2. He then joined Empoli, where he slowly established himself as one of the stars of the small Tuscan team. During the January 2006 transfer window, several Italian football pundits claimed that Real Madrid were interested in signing Tavano, but he eventually signed for Valencia in mid-2006, for €9 million. He received a call-up from the Italy national team in April 2006, when manager Marcello Lippi held trials for the 23-man squad that would go on to win the 2006 FIFA World Cup, but he never made his international debut.

His time in Spain, however, proved unsuccessful, as he fell out with the coaching staff after making statements in the press, which led to him being a sub-player for most of his short stay in Spain. Tavano then returned to Italy for a loan spell with Roma, where he mostly served as a reserve player for the main Giallorossi strikers. However, he was able to win the 2006–07 Coppa Italia with the club.

In 2007, he was permanently signed by Livorno, for a reported €5.5 million on a four-year contract. He received the number 10 jersey, previously retired in honour of Igor Protti and unretired that year under explicit request from the former amaranto star. Despite being the club's top scorer in his comeback season in Tuscany, his side did not manage to escape from relegation. Tavano agreed to stay at Livorno also in their 2008–09 Serie B campaign to try to lead his team back into the top flight.

He scored a hat-trick against Avellino on the season's opening day, making it the first round 1 hat-trick since 1994. He would then score at Piacenza before standing back to back with a teammate in celebration. He missed a penalty against Empoli, his former club, with the score tied at 1–1 before Antonio Buscè scored Empoli's winner. Tavano would, however, get a goal in the 5–2 win over Frosinone on the way to 25 for the season, giving him the capocannoniere title and ensuring promotion through the playoffs after missing out on automatic promotion to Bari and Parma. However, he had a hard season in Serie A, as Livorno were the only newly promoted team to go down. He scored the winner at Roma, but only scored four more goals.

He retired in 2022 after starting the season with Eccellenza Tuscany amateurs Tuttocuoio at the age of 43.

== Coaching career ==
On 15 November 2022, Tavano took on his first head coaching role, in charge of Eccellenza Tuscany club Tuttocuoio, for which he was playing before, therefore forcing him to quit his playing career as a consequence. He was sacked on 14 November 2023.

== Honours ==
Roma

- Coppa Italia: 2006–07
