= Nello Di Costanzo =

Italian footballer and manager

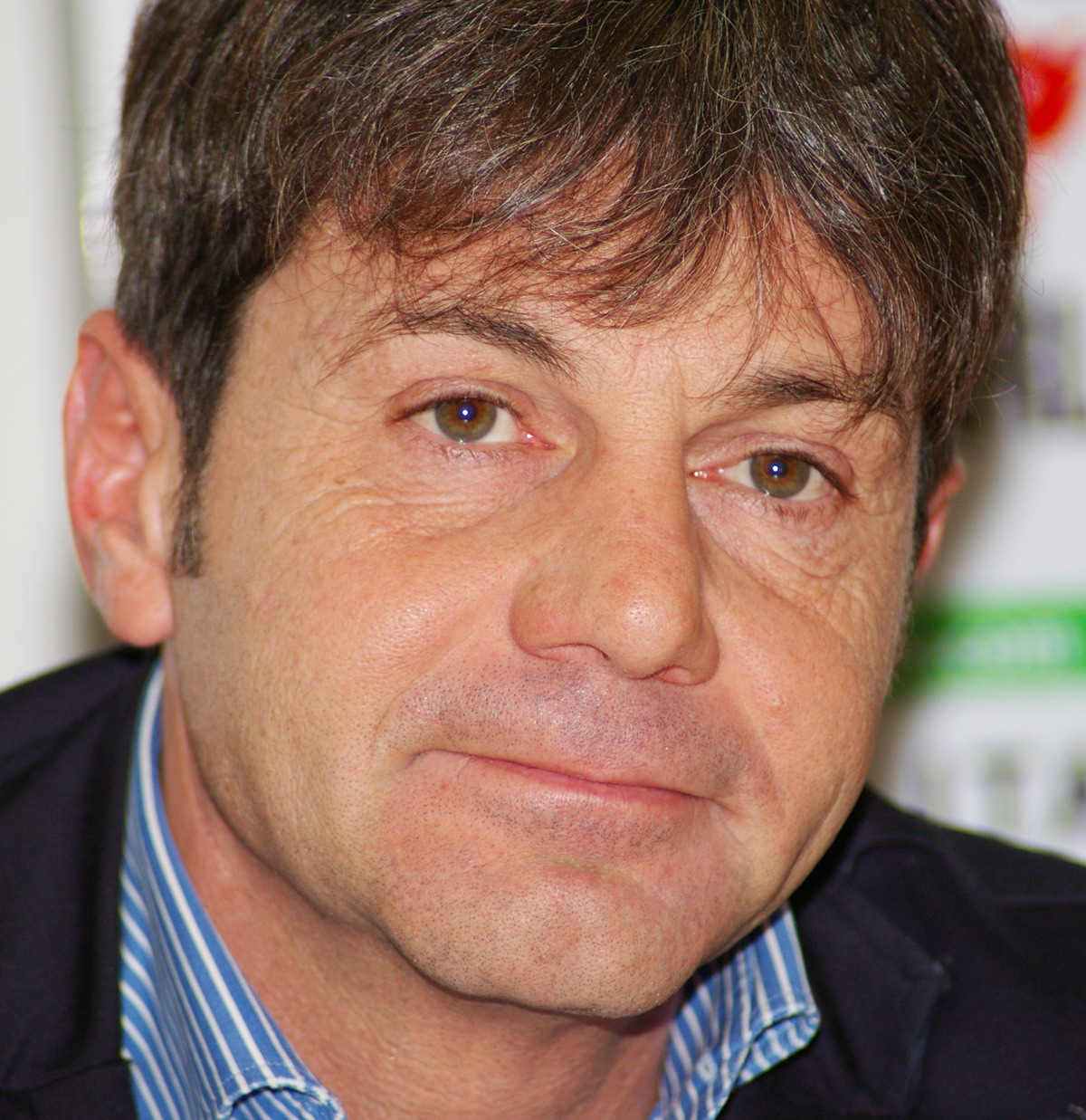

Personal information
- Full name: Cuono Di Costanzo
- Date of birth: 26 July 1961 (age 65)
- Place of birth: Rome, Italy
- Position: Forward

Youth career
- 1972–1977: Milan
- 1977–1982: Napoli

Senior career*
Years	Team	Apps	(Gls)
1982–1986	Gladiator		
1986–1987	Afragolese	31	(1)
1987–1990	Turris Calcio	70	(0)

Managerial career
- 1995–1999: Viribus Unitis
- 1999–2000: Palmese
- 2000–2001: Viribus Unitis
- 2001–2002: Gladiator
- 2002–2004: Benevento
- 2004–2005: Juve Stabia
- 2005–2007: Venezia
- 2007–2008: Messina
- 2008: Ascoli
- 2010: Padova
- 2012: Barletta
- 2012–2013: Carrarese
- 2013–2014: Aversa Normanna
- 2015: Messina
- 2016: Ischia Isolaverde
- 2016–2017: Frattese
- 2018: Pomigliano
- 2018–2019: Casertana (technical director)
- 2019: Nocerina
- 2021: Afragolese
- 2021–2022: Brindisi
- 2022: Taranto
- 2023–2024: Angri
- * Club domestic league appearances and goals

Cuono "Nello" Di Costanzo (born 26 July 1961) is an Italian football manager and former player, who played as a forward.

== Career ==
=== Playing ===
A striker, he played in the youth ranks of AC Milan and Napoli, also winning a Campionato Nazionale Primavera title; however, despite this, he spent his whole career in the Italian lower leagues.

=== Coaching ===
In 1995, he started his coaching career with Prima Categoria team Viribus Unitis, which he led to three promotions in four years, leading them to Serie D. He then coached Palmese in 1999–2000 before returning at Viribus Unitis the following season, barely missing the Serie D league title. He was then called in 2001 to coach Gladiator, leading the Santa Maria Capua Vetere-based team to win their Serie D round, thus ensuring them promotion to Serie C2. In 2002, he accepted an offer from then-Serie C1 team Benevento, obtaining an eighth place in his first season but being ultimately sacked in the 2003–2004 mid-season due to poor results. He then led Juve Stabia to second place in the 2004–2005 Serie C2 before accepting an offer from Venezia. During his two-year spell with the arancioneroverdi, Di Costanzo immediately won the Serie C2 title and narrowly missed a second consecutive promotion the following season after losing to Pisa in the promotion playoffs.

In 2007–08, he served as head coach of Messina, guiding the giallorossi to a mid-table finish in the season. He will coach Ascoli in the upcoming 2008–09 season. He was sacked on 21 October 2008 following a string of poor results.

On 9 February 2010, he was announced as the new head coach of Serie B relegation-battling side Padova. His time at Padua lasted only a few weeks, as he failed to change the club's fortunes in the games he was in charge and was ultimately sacked on 10 April.

From 7 February 2012 until the end of the season, he was the new coach of Barletta in place of the sacked Marco Carri.

On 2 October 2012, he was named new coach of Carrarese in place of the resigned Carlo Sabatini.

In March 2018, he was hired by Pomigliano.

On 8 July 2019, he joined Serie D club Nocerina. He was dismissed by Nocerina on 21 October 2019.

He successively coached Serie D relegation-battling club Afragolese from March to June 2021. In October 2021, Di Costanzo signed for Brindisi, another Serie D club.

On 6 June 2022, Di Costanzo was announced as the new head coach of Serie C club Taranto on a one-year deal, thus marking his return to professional football after six years. He was dismissed on 12 September 2022, after the second matchday of the season, together with club's sporting director Nicola Dionisio.

On 21 November 2023, Di Costanzo was appointed new head coach of Angri in the Italian Serie D league. He was sacked on 5 March 2024, with Angri deep in the relegation zone.
