= Pasquale Marino =

Italian football manager (born 1962)

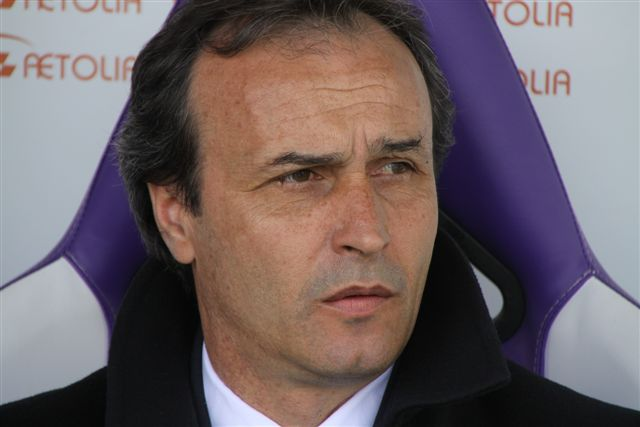

Personal information
- Date of birth: 13 July 1962 (age 64)
- Place of birth: Marsala, Italy
- Position: Midfielder

Youth career
- Marsala

Senior career*
Years	Team	Apps	(Gls)
?–1984	Marsala		
1984–1986	Akragas		
1986–1989	Siracusa		
1989–1992	Battipagliese		
1992–1993	Potenza		
1993–1994	Messina		
1994–1997	Catania		

Managerial career
- 1997–1999: Milazzo
- 1999–2000: Ragusa
- 2000–2002: Paternò
- 2002–2004: Foggia
- 2004–2005: Arezzo
- 2005: Arezzo
- 2005–2007: Catania
- 2007–2009: Udinese
- 2010: Udinese
- 2010–2011: Parma
- 2011–2012: Genoa
- 2013–2014: Pescara
- 2014–2016: Vicenza
- 2016–2017: Frosinone
- 2017–2018: Brescia
- 2018–2019: Spezia
- 2019: Palermo
- 2020: Empoli
- 2020–2021: SPAL
- 2021: Crotone
- 2023–2024: Bari
- 2025: Salernitana
- * Club domestic league appearances and goals

Pasquale Marino (born 13 July 1962) is an Italian football manager and former player.

== Playing career ==
A midfielder, Marino started for his home team, Marsala. Marino never played in divisions higher than Serie C1 and ended his career for Catania in 1996–97.

== Coaching career ==
His coaching career began in 1997–98 for Serie D team Milazzo, where he nearly won the league on his debut, ending in second place. However, his outbreak came at Paternò, which he led on two consecutive promotions from Serie D to Serie C1. He then signed for Serie C2 Foggia, which led to an immediate Serie C1 promotion. He made his Serie B debut in 2004–05 with Arezzo, replacing Mario Somma. Fired in the half-season and replaced by Marco Tardelli, he was successively recalled at the helm of the team, ending in 14th place.

In 2005, he became coach of Catania: in his first season for the rossoblu, Marino brought the team back to Serie A after over 20 years. He also coached Catania in its 2006–07 Serie A campaign. After a very impressive start that brought Catania up to the highest table positions, Catania experienced a negative streak following the riots in the Sicilian derby, which caused the death of a policeman and resulted in the Catania home stadium to be disqualified for the remainder of the season. After Catania saved in the last matchday, thanks to a 2–1 win to relegation rivals Chievo, Marino announced he would leave his post. He later signed a four-year contract with Udinese. Speaking to SkyItalia in the post-match interview, Marino didn't hide his disappointment following the lacklustre display by his side against bottom-placed Reggina. “We were awful this afternoon, and despite having a numerical advantage, it seemed as if we were the team playing in nine men," snarled Marino. "I am very disappointed with the display despite the positive result. I certainly was not expecting such a poor display from my men today, as I expect everyone to give their all when they put on the Zebrette shirt.”

He was stripped of his managerial duties on 22 December 2009, as Udinese failed to impress in the first half of the 2009–10 season, and was replaced by Gianni De Biasi. He was appointed back at the helm of Udinese on 21 February 2010, after De Biasi was sacked due to poor results.

In June 2010 he was appointed new head coach of Parma, replacing Francesco Guidolin. On 3 April 2011 Marino, after the home defeat with Bari was sacked. On 22 December 2011, he was appointed the new head coach of Genoa to replace Alberto Malesani who was sacked after a disastrous 1–6 away defeat against Napoli. Marino's tenure as Genoa coach however turned out to be rather disappointing, as he did not manage to bring the team back into the fight for a European competition spot and instead left it close to the relegation zone; he was ultimately dismissed on 2 April 2012 after a 4–5 loss to Inter, and replaced by his predecessor Alberto Malesani.

He then accepted an offer to become the new head coach of Serie B promotion hopefuls Pescara for the 2013–14 season but was dismissed later throughout the season due to poor results.

Marino returned into management on 30 October 2014, taking over from Giovanni Lopez at Vicenza, still in Serie B.

On 6 June 2016, Marino was appointed manager of Frosinone. He left the club by the end of the season, after losing automatic promotion on the final days of the season, and then being surprisingly defeating by Carpi in the playoff semi-finals.

On 12 October 2017, he was named new head coach of Serie B club Brescia. He was dismissed by Brescia on 16 January 2018.

In June 2018, he was appointed by Spezia as their new head coach. He guided Spezia to a promotion playoff spot, during which they lost to Cittadella in the first round.

On 7 June 2019, he was named the new head coach of Serie B club Palermo, thus marking his comeback as a head coach in his native Sicily. However, he never actually managed to serve on his role as the club was excluded from Serie B on 12 July 2019 due to financial irregularities.

On 26 January 2020, he was appointed as head coach of Serie B club Empoli.

On 11 August 2020, his contract was terminated by mutual consent by Empoli, and the following day he was hired as manager of SPAL. He was fired by SPAL on 16 March 2021, following a 0–3 loss to Pisa.

On 29 October 2021, he was appointed new head coach of Serie B relegation struggling Crotone, replacing Francesco Modesto. He was fired on 10 December 2021, after Crotone gained only 1 points in 7 games under his coaching, and replaced by Modesto.

On 9 October 2023, Marino returned to management after almost two years without a job, accepting the head coach position at Serie B club Bari and agreeing on a contract until the end of the season. On 5 February 2024, following a negative string of results, Marino was dismissed from his post with immediate effect.

On 7 April 2025, Marino was appointed in charge of Serie B relegation-threatened club Salernitana, becoming the fourth head coach of the season for the club.

== Managerial statistics ==
As of match played 22 June 2025

Managerial record by team and tenure
Team	Nat	From	To	Record							
Team	Nat	From	To	G	W	D	L	GF	GA	GD	Win %
Milazzo	(Italy)	1 July 1997	1 July 1999	74	32	24	18	96	72	+24	43.24
Ragusa	(Italy)	1 July 1999	1 July 2000	36	12	9	15	46	42	+4	33.33
Paternò	(Italy)	1 July 2000	1 July 2002	86	44	28	14	145	82	+63	51.16
Foggia	(Italy)	1 July 2002	1 July 2004	78	34	23	21	118	103	+15	43.59
Arezzo	(Italy)	1 July 2004	27 February 2005	31	6	13	12	40	43	−3	19.35
Arezzo	(Italy)	21 April 2005	1 July 2005	8	4	1	3	8	7	+1	50.00
Catania	(Italy)	1 July 2005	1 June 2007	82	32	24	26	114	113	+1	39.02
Udinese	(Italy)	4 June 2007	22 December 2009	111	46	27	38	155	145	+10	41.44
Udinese	(Italy)	21 February 2010	28 May 2010	15	6	5	4	27	24	+3	40.00
Parma	(Italy)	2 June 2010	3 April 2011	33	8	12	13	32	44	−12	24.24
Genoa	(Italy)	22 December 2011	2 April 2012	15	3	4	8	23	34	−11	20.00
Pescara	(Italy)	7 June 2013	22 February 2014	29	11	7	11	37	37	+0	37.93
Vicenza	(Italy)	30 October 2014	14 March 2016	67	23	25	19	72	70	+2	34.33
Frosinone	(Italy)	6 June 2016	29 May 2017	46	22	12	12	60	45	+15	47.83
Brescia	(Italy)	11 October 2017	16 January 2018	13	3	4	6	12	14	−2	23.08
Spezia	(Italy)	20 June 2018	30 May 2019	39	15	9	15	56	50	+6	38.46
Palermo	(Italy)	7 June 2019	12 July 2019	0	0	0	0	0	0	+0	—
Empoli	(Italy)	26 January 2020	11 August 2020	18	9	4	5	27	22	+5	50.00
SPAL	(Italy)	12 August 2020	16 March 2021	34	12	14	8	39	37	+2	35.29
Crotone	(Italy)	29 October 2021	10 December 2021	7	0	1	6	5	12	−7	0.00
Bari	(Italy)	9 October 2023	5 February 2024	14	4	5	5	15	20	−5	28.57
Salernitana	(Italy)	7 April 2025	Present	8	4	0	4	9	10	−1	50.00
Total				844	330	251	263	1,136	1,026	+110	39.10
