= Mario Somma =

Italian footballer and manager

Personal information
- Date of birth: 17 September 1963 (age 63)
- Place of birth: Latina, Lazio, Italy
- Height: 1.78 m (5 ft 10 in)
- Position: Defender

Senior career*
Years	Team	Apps	(Gls)
1980–1983	Genoa	7	(0)
1983–1985	Carrarese	50	(0)
1985–1986	Mestre	26	(0)
1986–1989	Cavese	51	(2)
1989–1990	Salernitana	18	(0)
1990–1992	Nola	47	(0)
1992–1993	Salernitana	27	(0)
1993–1994	Avellino	5	(0)
1994–1996	Turris	15	(0)
1996–1997	Pavia	5	(0)

Managerial career
- 1997–1998: Pro Cisterna
- 1998–1999: Terracina
- 1999–2000: Baracca Lugo
- 2000–2001: Potenza
- 2001–2002: Albalonga
- 2002–2003: Cavese
- 2003–2004: Arezzo
- 2004–2006: Empoli
- 2006–2007: Brescia
- 2007–2008: Piacenza
- 2009: Mantova
- 2009–2010: Triestina
- 2012: Grosseto
- 2014: Salernitana
- 2015–2016: Latina
- 2016–2017: Catanzaro
- 2020: Potenza
- 2023: Foggia
- 2024: Terracina
- * Club domestic league appearances and goals

Mario Somma (born 17 September 1963) is an Italian football manager.

== Playing career ==
Somma, who was born in Latina, Lazio, started his career with Genoa and then spent his later years mostly at the Serie C1 and Serie C2 level, playing for several Campanian teams. He retired in 1997.

== Coaching career ==
Somma started his coaching career in 1997 with amateur team Pro Cisterna, and then served as head coach for several other Serie D teams, including Potenza and Cavese, winning promotion to Serie C2 with the latter. In 2003, he was appointed at the helm of Serie C1 team Arezzo, leading the Tuscan side to a historical triumph in the league. This caused interest by Empoli, which chose to offer him the job for their 2004–05 Serie B campaign. As Somma managed to win a personal third consecutive promotion, leading Empoli to become Serie B runners-up, he was confirmed by the Tuscans for their 2005–06 campaign; despite an impressive start, Empoli's performances slowly fell down, causing Somma to be dismissed from his job in January 2006.

Somma started the 2006–07 season as head coach of Brescia in the Serie B, with the aim to lead the rondinelle back to the top flight: however he was sacked in February 2007 as he did not manage to obtain more than a mid-table place. In October 2007 he was appointed at the helm of Piacenza to replace Gian Marco Remondina. He led the biancorossi to escape relegation in the season, but was sacked immediately after the final matchday.

In February 2009 he was appointed to replace Alessandro Costacurta as head coach of Serie B club Mantova. He left at the end of the season after having guided his side to a mid-table finish.

In October 2009 he returned into football management as new head coach of Triestina, replacing dismissed boss Luca Gotti. However, he was sacked in February 2010, with Triestina in 18th place, and only one point shy of immediate relegation.

On 1 October 2012 he was named new coach of Grosseto en place of the sacked Francesco Moriero., but on 18 November 2012 he was also sacked.

On 8 June 2014 he was named new head coach of Lega Pro club Salernitana. He was however dismissed as head coach only two months later, on 17 August 2014, after only one game in charge of the team (a 0–1 loss to Alessandria in the first round of the 2014–15 Coppa Italia).

In August 2020, he was hired by Potenza. He was removed from his role on 2 November 2020, following a string of negative results.

On 23 February 2023, Somma returned into management as the new head coach of Serie C club Foggia until the end of the season, only to resign just a month later, on 25 March, following a 1–2 home loss to Monterosi.

On 25 July 2024, Somma moved down to Serie D, accepting the coaching job at newly-promoted club Terracina; however, he resigned only six days later, citing family reasons.

== Personal life ==
He is the father of football player Michele Somma.
