= Aldo Spinelli =

Italian entrepreneur and sports executive

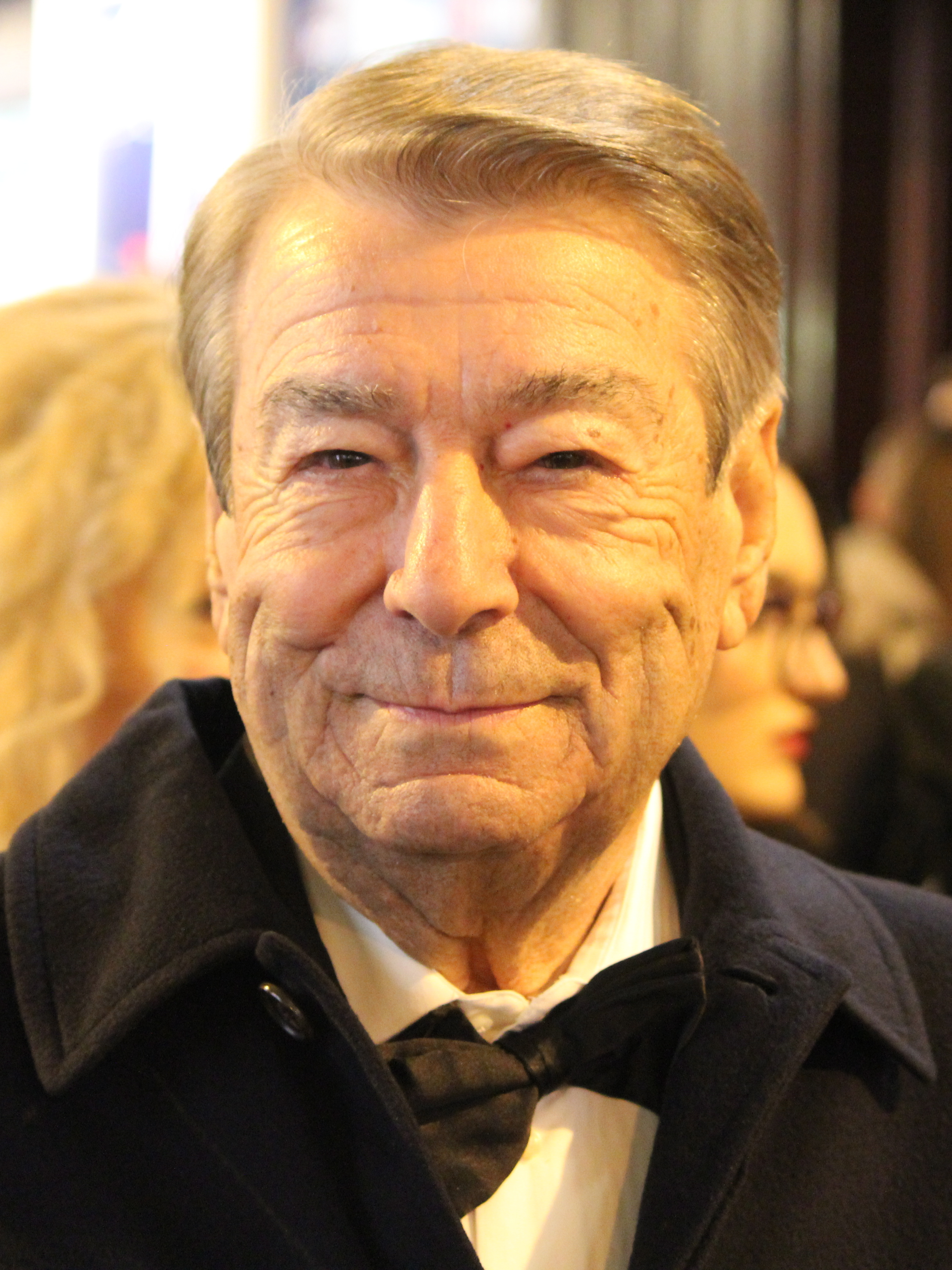
- Aldo Spinelli in 2026
- Born: Aldo Spinelli; 4 January 1940 (age 86); Palmi, Italy
- Occupations: Entrepreneur, sports executive
- Known for: President of Genoa and Livorno

Aldo Spinelli (January 4, 1940, Palmi, Italy) is an Italian entrepreneur and sports executive. Aldo Spinelli was born in 1940 in Palmi, Calabria, Italy.

== Biography ==
His father Roberto died on February 19, 1958, at the age of 42, in the shipwreck of the ship Bonitas owned by Ravano off the coast of Virginia.

Thanks to the American insurance compensation for his father's death and many promissory notes, Spinelli acquired the Almea transport company in 1963 at the age of 23, which already had significant financial problems. He renamed it Rebora, changed the color of the trucks from blue to yellow, and gradually shifted the company's focus to logistics and container transport by adapting the company's trailers for this type of transport.

On December 27, 1990, he was named Commander of the Order of Merit of the Italian Republic by President Francesco Cossiga, on the proposal of the Prime Minister's Office.

== Career ==
From 1997 to 2002, he also entered politics as a municipal councilor in Genoa for the PRI-Socialists list under the first administration of Mayor Giuseppe Pericu.

=== Genoa ===
On May 7, 1985, Spinelli took over the football club Genoa in Serie B. During his 13 seasons leading the club (six years in Serie A), he achieved several successes in the club's post-war history, including reaching the semi-finals of the UEFA Cup, winning among other matches, the home and away games against Liverpool (the first Italian team to win at Anfield), and the Anglo-Italian Cup.

He left the presidency of the Genoa club on October 11, 1997.

=== Livorno ===
On March 1, 1999, he became president of Serie C1 club Livorno. He applied his experience from managing Genoa to lead Livorno from Serie C1 to Serie A in 2004, with four consecutive seasons in the top tier and a participation in the UEFA Cup in the 2006–2007 season, reaching the round of 32. After just one year in Serie B due to relegation in 2008, Spinelli brought Livorno back to Serie A in June 2009, but the team did not manage to avoid another relegation.

After three seasons in Serie B, the "amaranto" returned to Serie A on June 2, 2013, but due to many difficulties, they were relegated again at the end of the season. In April 2014, Spinelli began negotiations to sell the club to Livorno native Stefano Bandecchi, an entrepreneur and founder of Niccolò Cusano University, but the deal fell through.

In the 2014–2015 season, the team missed the playoffs (lost in the last match with Pescara), and the following year, it was relegated to Serie C after 14 years.

Starting in the 2016–2017 season, Spinelli worked for the club's revival by including Igor Protti in the club's ranks, achieving a third-place finish and a playoff spot (reaching the quarter-finals, where they lost to Reggiana).

The following year, the club reorganized with the entry of new minority shareholders and built a competitive team aiming to win the championship, which happened on April 28, 2018: thanks to a home draw against Carrarese and the simultaneous defeat of Siena, the amaranto returned to Serie B with one match to spare.

In the newly found Serie B, Spinelli (no longer supported by the minority shareholder) chose Cristiano Lucarelli as coach and Alessandro Diamanti as the main signing for the midfield. The primary goal was a peaceful salvation. The start of the season was complicated and yielded few results. On November 6, 2018 (shortly after the coach's dismissal), the president announced his resignation along with his son, the club's CEO, Roberto Spinelli.

With the new relegation to Serie C, on September 11, 2020 (after 21 seasons at the helm, including 6 years in Serie A and 10 years in Serie B), Spinelli announced the sale to Rosettano Navarra (21%) and other entrepreneurs (69%), keeping 10% of the shares for himself.

== Honours ==
- Commander of the Order of Merit of the Italian Republic — Rome, December 27, 1990

== See also ==
- Genoa
- Livorno
