= 2007–08 Serie B =

Italian football league season

Serie B TIM
- Season: 2007–08
- Champions: Chievo (1st title)
- Promoted: Chievo; Bologna; Lecce (by Play-off)
- Relegated: Cesena; Spezia (bankruptcy); Ravenna; Messina (bankruptcy)
- Matches: 462
- Goals: 1,189 (2.57 per match)
- Top goalscorer: (Italy) Denis Godeas (28 goals)

Geographical distribution of Serie B teams for season 2007-08

The 2007–08 Serie B regular season is the seventy-sixth since its establishment. It started on August 25, 2007, and ended with the promotion playoff final on June 15, 2008.

At the end of the year, three teams were promoted to Serie A, the first two via direct promotion (league champions, Chievo Verona, and Bologna), and the third team after two rounds of playoffs (Lecce).

Four teams were relegated to Serie C1. The bottom three were relegated directly (Cesena, Spezia and Ravenna), as was the fourth-to-last team (Avellino), since they finished 9 points back of the fifth-to-last, Treviso, denying them a chance at a survival "relegation-playoff".

The 2007–08 Serie B season marked the first appearance in the division for newly promoted Grosseto. Ravenna and Chievo returned to the second-highest Italian division after six years, their last time in Serie B having been in 2001 (both, in fact, returned to the leagues from which they'd come after this season). Pisa returned to Serie B after 13 years, surprisingly qualifying for the promotion playoffs.

== Teams ==
=== Stadiums and locations ===
The following 22 clubs comprise the Serie B in 2007-08:

| Club | Home City | Stadium Name | 2006/2007 Season |
|---|---|---|---|
| AlbinoLeffe | Bergamo | Stadio Atleti Azzurri d'Italia | 10th in Serie B |
| Ascoli | Ascoli Piceno | Stadio Cino e Lillo Del Duca | 19th in Serie A |
| Avellino | Avellino | Stadio Partenio | Serie C1/B Playoff Winners |
| Bari | Bari | Stadio San Nicola | 13th in Serie B |
| Bologna | Bologna | Stadio Renato dall'Ara | 7th in Serie B |
| Brescia | Brescia | Stadio Mario Rigamonti | 6th in Serie B |
| Cesena | Cesena | Stadio Dino Manuzzi | 16th in Serie B |
| Chievo Verona | Verona | Stadio Marcantonio Bentegodi | 18th in Serie A |
| Frosinone | Frosinone | Stadio Matusa | 14th in Serie B |
| Grosseto | Grosseto | Stadio Olimpico Carlo Zecchini | Serie C1/A Champions |
| Lecce | Lecce | Stadio Via del Mare | 9th in Serie B |
| Mantova | Mantova | Stadio Danilo Martelli | 8th in Serie B |
| Messina | Messina | Stadio San Filippo | 20th in Serie A |
| Modena | Modena | Stadio Alberto Braglia | 15th in Serie B |
| Piacenza | Piacenza | Stadio Leonardo Garilli | 4th in Serie B |
| Pisa | Pisa | Arena Garibaldi | Serie C1/A Playoff Winners |
| Ravenna | Ravenna | Stadio Bruno Benelli | Serie C1/B Champions |
| Rimini | Rimini | Stadio Romeo Neri | 5th in Serie B |
| Spezia | La Spezia | Stadio Alberto Picco | 18th in Serie B |
| Treviso | Treviso | Stadio Omobono Tenni | 12th in Serie B |
| Triestina | Trieste | Stadio Nereo Rocco | 17th in Serie B |
| Vicenza | Vicenza | Stadio Romeo Menti | 11th in Serie B |

=== Personnel and kits ===
| Team | President | Manager | Kit manufacturer | Shirt sponsor |
|---|---|---|---|---|
| AlbinoLeffe | (Italy) Gianfranco Andreoletti | (Italy) Armando Madonna | Acerbis | UBI Banca Popolare di Bergamo |
| Ascoli | (Italy) Roberto Benigni | (Italy) Ivo Iaconi | Legea | Cult Shoes, Fainplast |
| Avellino | (Italy) Massimo Pugliese | (Italy) Alessandro Calori | Legea | Sidigas |
| Bari | (Italy) Vincenzo Matarrese | (Italy) Antonio Conte | Erreà | Gaudianello, Radionorba |
| Bologna | (Italy) Alfredo Cazzola | (Italy) Daniele Arrigoni | Macron | Joe Marmellata/Carisbo, COGEI |
| Brescia | (Italy) Gino Corioni | (Italy) Serse Cosmi | Asics | UBI Banco di Brescia, Bregoli SpA |
| Cesena | (Italy) Giorgio Lugaresi | (Italy) Fabrizio Castori | Mass | Gomme & Service, Solo Affitti |
| Chievo Verona | (Italy) Luca Campedelli | (Italy) Giuseppe Iachini | Lotto | Banca Popolare di Verona/Soglia Hotels & Resorts, Cattolica Assicurazioni |
| Frosinone | (Italy) Maurizio Stirpe | (Italy) Alberto Cavasin | Legea | Banca Popolare del Frusinate, Provincia di Frosinone |
| Grosseto | (Italy) Piero Camilli | (Italy) Stefano Pioli | Erreà | Industria Lavorazione Carni Ovine, Banca della Maremma |
| Lecce | (Italy) Giovanni Semeraro | (Italy) Giuseppe Papadopulo | Asics | Notte della Taranta, Lachifarma |
| Mantova | (Italy) Fabrizio Lori | (Italy) Giuseppe Brucato | Diadora | Nuova Pansac |
| Messina | (Italy) Pietro Franza | (Italy) Nello Di Costanzo | Legea | Framon Hotel Group, Chevrolet |
| Modena | (Italy) Alfredo Amadei | (Italy) Daniele Zoratto | Erreà | Immergas, Kerakoll |
| Piacenza | (Italy) Fabrizio Garilli | (Italy) Mario Somma | Macron | UNICEF |
| Pisa | (Italy) Leonardo Covarelli | (Italy) Gian Piero Ventura | Joma | Limonta Sport, Abitalia |
| Ravenna | (Italy) Gianni Fabbri | (Italy) Franco Varrella | Diadora | CVC Ravenna, Porto Marinara |
| Rimini | (Italy) Luca Benedettini | (Italy) Leonardo Acori | Macron | Banca di Rimini (H)/COCIF (A) |
| Spezia | (Italy) Giuseppe Ruggieri | (Italy) Antonio Soda | Erreà | Hyundai, Carispe |
| Treviso | (Italy) Ettore Setten | (Italy) Giuseppe Pillon | Lotto | Grigolin, Provincia di Treviso |
| Triestina | (Italy) Stefano Fantinel | (Italy) Rolando Maran | Asics | Bossini, Fantinel/Testa&Molinaro |
| Vicenza | (Italy) Gian Luigi Polato | (Italy) Angelo Gregucci | Diadora | Fieri di Vicenza/Vicenzaoro First/Vicenzaoro Charm/Banca Popolare di Vicenza |

== Events ==
In November, it was announced that Serie B matches, as well as Serie C matches, would be postponed for one week after increasing violence surrounding Italian football matches, in which football fans attacked police, stemming from the shooting of a Lazio fan by a policeman. Serie A matches were unaffected as none were scheduled for that weekend due to an international match between Italy and Scotland.

On January 19, at the conclusion of the andata (first half of the league season), Chievo Verona and Bologna were named winter co-champions.

=== Promotions ===
With a 1–1 draw away to Grosseto on Matchday 41, Chievo Verona mathematically assured themselves of promotion to Serie A.

On the final matchday, Bologna's 1–0 victory over Pisa rendered Lecce's victory by the same score immaterial; Bologna secured the second direct promotion. Chievo Verona's 2–2 draw with Bari outdistanced the rossoblu, however, giving the mussi volanti their first league title in 14 years.

Lecce were instead left to contest the two-round promotion playoff with AlbinoLeffe, Brescia and Pisa, which will determine the identity of the 20th and final team in Italy's top flight.

=== Relegations ===
On Day 40, Cesena became the first team mathematically relegated to Serie C1 with its 2–1 loss at Treviso. Although Cesena could still have finished 19th at the time, at best it would have been 5 points behind 18th-placed Treviso, a condition that would have made playouts unnecessary.

Then on Day 41, another Treviso win—coupled with concurrent losses by Ravenna, Avellino, and Spezia—ensured that none of those three teams would finish within 4 points of the veneti, consigning all three of them to Serie C1.

== Final classification ==
| Pos | Team | Pld | W | D | L | GF | GA | GD | Pts | Promotion or relegation |
|---|---|---|---|---|---|---|---|---|---|---|
| 1 | Chievo (C, P) | 42 | 24 | 13 | 5 | 77 | 43 | +34 | 85 | Promotion to Serie A |
| 2 | Bologna (P) | 42 | 24 | 12 | 6 | 58 | 29 | +29 | 84 | Promotion to Serie A |
| 3 | Lecce (O, P) | 42 | 23 | 14 | 5 | 70 | 29 | +41 | 83 | Qualification to promotion play-offs |
| 4 | AlbinoLeffe | 42 | 23 | 9 | 10 | 67 | 48 | +19 | 78 | Qualification to promotion play-offs |
| 5 | Brescia | 42 | 20 | 12 | 10 | 59 | 40 | +19 | 72 | Qualification to promotion play-offs |
| 6 | Pisa | 42 | 19 | 14 | 9 | 61 | 44 | +17 | 71 | Qualification to promotion play-offs |
| 7 | Rimini | 42 | 20 | 9 | 13 | 68 | 46 | +22 | 69 | |
| 8 | Ascoli | 42 | 16 | 14 | 12 | 64 | 49 | +15 | 62 | |
| 9 | Mantova | 42 | 16 | 12 | 14 | 56 | 49 | +7 | 60 | |
| 10 | Frosinone | 42 | 15 | 11 | 16 | 63 | 67 | −4 | 56 | |
| 11 | Bari | 42 | 13 | 16 | 13 | 50 | 55 | −5 | 55 | |
| 12 | Triestina | 42 | 13 | 12 | 17 | 55 | 67 | −12 | 51 | |
| 13 | Grosseto | 42 | 10 | 19 | 13 | 47 | 54 | −7 | 49 | |
| 14 | Messina (Note: Subsequently did not submit subscription to 2008–09 Serie B and placed in 2008–09 Serie D.) (E, R, R) | 42 | 13 | 10 | 19 | 38 | 62 | −24 | 49 | Relegation to Serie D |
| 15 | Piacenza | 42 | 13 | 8 | 21 | 43 | 59 | −16 | 47 | |
| 16 | Modena | 42 | 10 | 16 | 16 | 57 | 65 | −8 | 46 | |
| 17 | Vicenza | 42 | 10 | 15 | 17 | 43 | 60 | −17 | 45 | |
| 18 | Treviso | 42 | 11 | 12 | 19 | 41 | 52 | −11 | 45 | |
| 19 | Avellino (T) | 42 | 8 | 12 | 22 | 42 | 64 | −22 | 36 | Spared from relegation (Note: Initially, no relegation playoffs held as Treviso was more than 4 points clear of 4th-last place. Subsequently Avellino readmitted into Serie B in place of Messina.) |
| 20 | Ravenna (R) | 42 | 8 | 11 | 23 | 48 | 75 | −27 | 35 | Relegation to Lega Pro 1ªDiv |
| 21 | Spezia (Note: 1 point deducted for late tax payment. Subsequently placed in Serie D for financial problems.) (E, R, E, R) | 42 | 6 | 16 | 20 | 45 | 66 | −21 | 33 | Relegation to Serie D |
| 22 | Cesena (R) | 42 | 5 | 17 | 20 | 37 | 66 | −29 | 32 | Relegation to Lega Pro 1ªDiv |

Source: Panini
Rules for classification: 1) points; 2) head-to-head points; 3) head-to-head goal difference; 4) head-to-head goals scored; 5) goal difference; 6) number of goals scored.
(C) Champions; (E) Eliminated; (O) Play-off winners; (P) Promoted; (R) Relegated; (T) Qualified, but not yet for the particular phase indicated

== Results ==
| Home \ Away | ALB | ASC | AVE | BAR | BOL | BRE | CES | CHI | FRO | GRO | LEC | MAN | MES | MOD | PIA | PIS | RAV | RIM | SPE | TRE | TRI | VIC |
|---|---|---|---|---|---|---|---|---|---|---|---|---|---|---|---|---|---|---|---|---|---|---|
| AlbinoLeffe | — | 0–0 | 3–3 | 4–1 | 1–0 | 2–3 | 1–0 | 0–2 | 2–0 | 2–1 | 0–4 | 2–0 | 1–0 | 3–1 | 2–0 | 2–3 | 3–1 | 0–4 | 3–2 | 0–0 | 5–1 | 0–0 |
| Ascoli | 3–2 | — | 3–1 | 2–0 | 2–2 | 0–1 | 5–2 | 1–2 | 2–0 | 3–5 | 2–1 | 1–3 | 1–1 | 1–1 | 4–1 | 1–0 | 5–0 | 0–0 | 1–0 | 2–0 | 3–1 | 1–0 |
| Avellino | 0–0 | 0–2 | — | 3–2 | 1–0 | 1–1 | 3–1 | 1–1 | 0–1 | 0–3 | 0–2 | 0–1 | 1–2 | 1–1 | 0–1 | 3–1 | 3–2 | 2–1 | 2–2 | 1–1 | 2–2 | 3–0 |
| Bari | 0–1 | 1–1 | 1–0 | — | 1–1 | 0–0 | 0–0 | 2–3 | 3–1 | 0–0 | 0–4 | 2–0 | 1–1 | 1–1 | 2–1 | 1–2 | 4–2 | 0–1 | 2–1 | 0–1 | 2–0 | 2–0 |
| Bologna | 1–0 | 0–0 | 3–1 | 1–1 | — | 2–2 | 2–1 | 4–0 | 2–1 | 1–0 | 1–0 | 3–0 | 3–0 | 4–1 | 1–2 | 1–0 | 2–1 | 0–0 | 3–2 | 1–0 | 2–0 | 1–0 |
| Brescia | 1–2 | 0–4 | 3–0 | 0–0 | 2–0 | — | 3–0 | 0–2 | 2–2 | 4–1 | 0–0 | 0–3 | 3–1 | 2–0 | 2–0 | 1–0 | 2–1 | 2–0 | 1–0 | 0–0 | 4–1 | 2–0 |
| Cesena | 0–3 | 1–1 | 1–0 | 0–0 | 0–0 | 1–1 | — | 1–1 | 3–0 | 0–0 | 0–1 | 1–1 | 1–0 | 2–1 | 2–2 | 1–2 | 1–1 | 1–2 | 1–1 | 3–1 | 1–1 | 3–3 |
| Chievo | 0–1 | 3–1 | 3–0 | 2–2 | 1–1 | 3–0 | 3–1 | — | 2–0 | 2–0 | 3–3 | 2–3 | 4–1 | 0–0 | 1–0 | 2–2 | 3–2 | 2–2 | 5–0 | 1–0 | 3–0 | 2–1 |
| Frosinone | 2–2 | 3–3 | 2–1 | 4–1 | 0–0 | 0–0 | 5–2 | 1–2 | — | 4–0 | 1–2 | 2–1 | 4–0 | 2–4 | 2–2 | 1–5 | 2–1 | 3–2 | 4–2 | 1–0 | 0–1 | 0–0 |
| Grosseto | 2–2 | 1–1 | 2–1 | 2–2 | 3–0 | 0–1 | 0–0 | 1–1 | 1–1 | — | 1–1 | 1–0 | 0–0 | 0–2 | 2–1 | 2–0 | 2–2 | 2–1 | 3–0 | 1–1 | 1–2 | 2–1 |
| Lecce | 3–0 | 0–0 | 2–0 | 1–2 | 0–0 | 1–2 | 3–0 | 3–0 | 3–0 | 1–1 | — | 1–1 | 0–0 | 2–0 | 3–1 | 1–1 | 3–1 | 2–0 | 2–2 | 1–0 | 1–0 | 1–0 |
| Mantova | 0–1 | 0–1 | 2–0 | 1–1 | 0–1 | 1–1 | 4–1 | 1–0 | 3–2 | 0–0 | 1–0 | — | 4–0 | 3–2 | 1–0 | 0–1 | 1–1 | 0–1 | 3–1 | 2–1 | 2–0 | 2–3 |
| Messina | 2–1 | 1–0 | 1–0 | 1–2 | 2–1 | 2–1 | 1–0 | 2–3 | 0–0 | 1–1 | 1–3 | 1–0 | — | 3–3 | 2–0 | 1–2 | 2–1 | 1–0 | 0–0 | 2–0 | 1–2 | 0–2 |
| Modena | 2–3 | 2–1 | 1–0 | 3–0 | 0–2 | 0–3 | 1–1 | 1–2 | 2–2 | 3–0 | 1–2 | 2–2 | 1–0 | — | 2–0 | 0–0 | 1–2 | 0–2 | 2–2 | 1–1 | 1–2 | 1–1 |
| Piacenza | 1–3 | 2–1 | 1–0 | 1–0 | 0–1 | 2–4 | 0–0 | 1–3 | 1–2 | 1–1 | 0–1 | 3–3 | 0–1 | 1–2 | — | 4–2 | 2–0 | 2–1 | 1–0 | 0–0 | 2–0 | 1–1 |
| Pisa | 2–0 | 2–1 | 0–0 | 1–1 | 0–0 | 0–3 | 3–0 | 1–1 | 0–1 | 0–0 | 1–1 | 1–1 | 0–0 | 3–3 | 3–1 | — | 1–0 | 0–2 | 1–0 | 2–0 | 2–1 | 1–1 |
| Ravenna | 0–2 | 2–1 | 0–1 | 1–2 | 1–1 | 0–0 | 0–0 | 1–1 | 0–2 | 2–1 | 1–3 | 5–2 | 1–0 | 1–1 | 1–0 | 1–4 | — | 0–1 | 2–2 | 1–0 | 2–2 | 0–1 |
| Rimini | 0–0 | 3–0 | 2–2 | 2–1 | 1–2 | 2–1 | 4–1 | 0–0 | 1–1 | 2–0 | 2–3 | 1–1 | 3–0 | 1–0 | 0–1 | 1–1 | 3–4 | — | 4–2 | 2–1 | 4–3 | 5–1 |
| Spezia | 0–2 | 0–0 | 2–2 | 1–1 | 0–2 | 1–0 | 1–0 | 0–1 | 3–0 | 2–2 | 1–1 | 0–1 | 2–0 | 2–2 | 1–2 | 1–4 | 2–0 | 0–1 | — | 3–2 | 0–1 | 1–1 |
| Treviso | 0–1 | 2–1 | 1–0 | 1–2 | 0–2 | 3–0 | 2–1 | 0–1 | 2–1 | 2–1 | 0–0 | 2–2 | 6–2 | 1–1 | 1–0 | 2–3 | 1–1 | 0–2 | 1–1 | — | 2–0 | 1–3 |
| Triestina | 2–4 | 1–1 | 2–2 | 1–1 | 1–3 | 1–0 | 2–1 | 1–1 | 1–2 | 4–0 | 1–1 | 1–0 | 1–1 | 3–1 | 1–1 | 0–1 | 4–3 | 1–0 | 0–0 | 0–1 | — | 5–1 |
| Vicenza | 1–1 | 1–1 | 2–1 | 2–3 | 0–1 | 1–1 | 1–0 | 1–3 | 2–1 | 0–0 | 1–3 | 0–0 | 3–1 | 1–2 | 0–1 | 1–3 | 1–0 | 3–2 | 0–0 | 0–0 | 2–2 | — |

Legend: Blue = home team win; Yellow = draw; Red = away team win.

== Promotion play-off ==
Semifinals
First legs played June 4, 2008; return legs played June 8, 2008

| Team 1 | Agg. | Team 2 | 1st leg | 2nd leg |
|---|---|---|---|---|
| Pisa (6) | 1-3 | (3) Lecce | 0-1 | 1-2 |
| Brescia (5) | 2-2 | (4) AlbinoLeffe | 1-0 | 1-2 |

Finals
First leg played June 11, 2008; return leg played June 15, 2008

| Team 1 | Agg. | Team 2 | 1st leg | 2nd leg |
|---|---|---|---|---|
| AlbinoLeffe (4) | 1-2 | (3) Lecce | 0-1 | 1-1 |

Lecce promoted to Serie A

== Top goalscorers ==
Players with at least 10 goals

28 goals

- (Italy) Denis Godeas (Mantova)

24 goals

- (Uruguay) Pablo Granoche (Triestina)

23 goals

- (Italy) Marco Cellini (AlbinoLeffe)
- (Italy) Massimo Marazzina (Bologna)

22 goals

- (Italy) Sergio Pellissier (Chievo Verona)

21 goals

- (Argentina) José Ignacio Castillo (Pisa)

20 goals

- (Italy) Francesco Lodi (Frosinone)

18 goals

- (Italy) Salvatore Bruno (Modena)
- (Italy) Alessandro Pellicori (Avellino)
- (Italy) Andrea Soncin (Ascoli)

17 goals

- (Italy) Simone Tiribocchi (Lecce)

16 goals

- (Italy) Marco Bernacci (Ascoli)
- (Italy) Davide Possanzini (Brescia)
- (Italy) Davide Succi (Ravenna)

15 goals

- (Italy) Davide Moscardelli (Cesena)

14 goals

- (Brazil) Barreto (Treviso)
- (Slovenia) Zlatko Dedič (Piacenza)

13 goals

- (Italy) Felice Evacuo (Frosinone)
- (Italy) Massimiliano Guidetti (Spezia)

12 goals

- (Italy) Elvis Abbruscato (Lecce)
- (Italy) Luigi Beghetto (Treviso)
- (Brazil) Jeda (Rimini)
- (Italy) Daniele Vantaggiato (Rimini)

11 goals

- (Argentina) Adrián Ricchiuti (Rimini)
- (Italy) Francesco Ruopolo (AlbinoLeffe)
- (Italy) Ferdinando Sforzini (Ravenna)

10 goals

- (Italy) Raffaele Biancolino (Messina)
- (Italy) Alessio Cerci (Pisa)
- (Belarus) Vitali Kutuzov (Pisa)
- (Italy) Davide Lanzafame (Bari)
- (Chile) Mario Salgado (Avellino)

== Managers ==
| Club | Head coach | From | To |
|---|---|---|---|
| Albinoleffe | Elio Gustinetti | June 19, 2007 | May 26, 2008 |
| Albinoleffe | Armando Madonna | May 26, 2008 | |
| Ascoli | Ivo Iaconi | June 16, 2007 | |
| Avellino | Giovanni Vavassori | April 18, 2007 | July 16, 2007 |
| Avellino | Maurizio Sarri | July 18, 2007 | August 23, 2007 |
| Avellino | Guido Carboni | August 23, 2007 | March 10, 2008 |
| Avellino | Alessandro Calori | March 10, 2008 | |
| Bari | Giuseppe Materazzi | February 26, 2007 | December 28, 2007 |
| Bari | Antonio Conte | December 28, 2007 | |
| Bologna | Daniele Arrigoni | June 11, 2007 | |
| Brescia | Serse Cosmi | February 28, 2007 | |
| Cesena | Fabrizio Castori | June 14, 2003 | November 11, 2007 |
| Cesena | Giovanni Vavassori | November 12, 2007 | February 25, 2008 |
| Cesena | Fabrizio Castori | February 25, 2008 | |
| Chievo Verona | Giuseppe Iachini | June 15, 2007 | |
| Frosinone | Alberto Cavasin | June 22, 2007 | |
| Grosseto | Giorgio Roselli | June 8, 2007 | September 10, 2007 |
| Grosseto | Stefano Pioli | September 11, 2007 | |
| Lecce | Giuseppe Papadopulo | December 24, 2006 | |
| Mantova | Attilio Tesser | June 11, 2007 | February 24, 2008 |
| Mantova | Giuseppe Brucato | February 25, 2008 | |
| Messina | Nello Di Costanzo | June 18, 2007 | |
| Modena | Bortolo Mutti | February 13, 2007 | April 20, 2008 |
| Modena | Daniele Zoratto | April 20, 2008 | |
| Piacenza | Gian Marco Remondina | July 2, 2007 | October 23, 2007 |
| Piacenza | Mario Somma | October 23, 2007 | |
| Pisa | Giampiero Ventura | June 25, 2007 | |
| Ravenna | Dino Pagliari | February 1, 2006 | December 2, 2007 |
| Ravenna | Franco Varrella | December 3, 2007 | January 14, 2008 |
| Ravenna | Dino Pagliari | January 14, 2008 | April 7, 2008 |
| Ravenna | Franco Varrella | April 7, 2008 | |
| Rimini | Leonardo Acori | June 12, 2002 | |
| Spezia | Antonio Soda | July 8, 2005 | |
| Treviso | Giuseppe Pillon | June 16, 2007 | |
| Triestina | Rolando Maran | June 13, 2007 | |
| Vicenza | Angelo Gregucci | October 3, 2006 | |

=== 2007-08 events ===
- AlbinoLeffe: on June 18, the club announced separation from head coach Emiliano Mondonico. The next day the club officially unveiled Elio Gustinetti, former club boss in the early Serie B campaigns for the club, as new boss. Under his reign, AlbinoLeffe managed to reach the top position of the league, becoming a potential candidate for a historical direct promotion to Serie A; however, four home consecutive losses in the end of the regular season deprived the seriani of this chance, just leaving them the opportunity to play the promotion playoffs. A 0–4 home loss to Rimini and a strained relationship between Gustinetti and club chairman Andreoletti led the latter to sack him on May 26, 2008 and appoint youth team coach Armando Madonna at the helm of the team for the remaining final league match and the following promotion playoffs.
- Avellino: on July 16, Giovanni Vavassori, originally confirmed at the helm of the club following their victory in the Serie C1 promotion playoffs, tended his resignations. Two days later the club announced to have appointed Maurizio Sarri as new head coach. But on August 23, only two days before the first Serie B matchday, Sarri resigned too, with Guido Carboni replacing him the same day. On March 10, 2008, with Avellino in 20th place, Carboni was sacked by the club management and replaced by Alessandro Calori.
- Ascoli: on June 15, former Frosinone boss Ivo Iaconi was unveiled as new head coach, succeeding Nedo Sonetti.
- Bari: on December 28, 2007 Giuseppe Materazzi tended his resignations following a clear loss to Lecce in a local derby, and only one day after having been confirmed at the helm of the galletti by the club management. He was replaced the same day by Antonio Conte.
- Bologna: on June 11 Daniele Arrigoni was announced as new head coach.
- Cesena: on November 11 Fabrizio Castori was sacked by Cesena following a 4–1 defeat at Rimini in the local derby which left the club down to last place, with Giovanni Vavassori being appointed to replace him the next day. However, on February 25, 2008, following a string of poor results which left Cesena in second-last place, Vavassori was sacked himself, with Castori being recalled at the helm of the bianconeri.
- Chievo Verona: the position, left vacant following separation between the club and head coach Luigi Delneri, was filled on June 15 by Giuseppe Iachini.
- Frosinone: on June 22 Alberto Cavasin was announced as new boss, thus filling the position left vacant following separation between the club and head coach Ivo Iaconi.
- Grosseto: the newly promoted side separated from head coach Antonello Cuccureddu on June 6 and replaced him with Giorgio Roselli two days later. On September 10, following three disappointing losses in the first three league days, Roselli was sacked. Consequently, on the following day the management announced the appointment of Stefano Pioli as new boss.
- Mantova: on June 11, 2007 Attilio Tesser was announced as new head coach, replacing Domenico Di Carlo, who chose not to renew his contract with the virgiliani. Mantova started their season as a strong candidate for immediate promotion to Serie A, but they struggled to do so and Tesser was consequently sacked on February 24, 2008 after a 1–1 home tie with relegation-battling Bari which left the biancorossi seven points behind the last promotion playoff spot. The next day, Giuseppe Brucato was named new head coach for the remainder of the season.
- Messina: on June 18, 2007 Nello Di Costanzo of Venezia was announced as new boss.
- Modena: on April 20, 2008 the Modena club management decided to sack Bortolo Mutti from the team's head coaching post, re-appointing former boss Daniele Zoratto back at the helm of the gialloblu.
- Piacenza: the position, left vacant following Giuseppe Iachini's departure to Chievo, was filled on July 2, 2007 with the appointment of former Sassuolo boss Gian Marco Remondina. As Remondina does not have a valid coaching licence valid for the Serie B league (known as Patentino di Prima Categoria, "first category licence"), he will officially appear as assistant coach beside former youth team coach Felice Secondini. On October 23 Remondina was however sacked due to poor results and replaced with former Empoli and Brescia boss Mario Somma.
- Pisa: on June 19, only two days after being promoted to Serie B through playoffs, the club announced separation from head coach Piero Braglia. On June 25, the club announced Giampiero Ventura's appointment for the 2007–08 season.
- Ravenna: on December 2, the newly promoted Serie B side announced to have dismissed Dino Pagliari from his head coaching position, as he struggled to keep the team off the relegation zone, appointing Franco Varrella as his replacement the next day. On January 14, 2008, as Ravenna failed to improve their results, Varrella was axed himself and Pagliari was called back at the helm of the giallorossi. Pagliari lasted only three months, being ultimately sacked once again on April 7, 2008 with Ravenna lying in last place with eight matches remaining. The same day Ravenna choice to reinstate Varrella at the head coaching position.
- Treviso: on June 16 Giuseppe Pillon was officially unveiled as new head coach.
- Triestina: on June 13 the club management announced to have appointed Rolando Maran as new head coach for the 2007–08 season, thus replacing former boss Franco Varrella.

== Attendances ==
| # | Club | Average |
|---|---|---|
| 1 | Bologna | 13,036 |
| 2 | Pisa | 11,239 |
| 3 | Lecce | 8,454 |
| 4 | Mantova | 8,451 |
| 5 | Modena | 8,322 |
| 6 | Chievo | 7,276 |
| 7 | Cesena | 7,110 |
| 8 | Vicenza | 7,044 |
| 9 | Spezia | 6,535 |
| 10 | Ascoli | 6,413 |
| 11 | Triestina | 6,309 |
| 12 | Rimini | 5,313 |
| 13 | Brescia | 4,689 |
| 14 | Frosinone | 4,107 |
| 15 | AlbinoLeffe | 3,797 |
| 16 | Messina | 3,777 |
| 17 | Bari | 3,773 |
| 18 | Grosseto | 3,515 |
| 19 | Ravenna | 3,478 |
| 20 | Treviso | 3,454 |
| 21 | Avellino | 3,314 |
| 22 | Piacenza | 3,156 |
