= 2010–11 Serie B =

Italian football league season

Serie B
- Season: 2010–11
- Champions: Atalanta (6th title)
- Promoted: Atalanta; Siena; Novara (by Play-off)
- Relegated: Piacenza; Triestina; Portogruaro; Frosinone
- Matches: 462
- Goals: 1,077 (2.33 per match)
- Top goalscorer: Federico Piovaccari (23)
- Biggest home win: Siena 5–0 Varese
- Biggest away win: Livorno 0–4 Sassuolo
- Highest scoring: Sassuolo 5–3 Frosinone

The 2010–11 Serie B (known as the Serie bwin for sponsorship reasons) is the seventy-ninth season since its establishment in 1929, and the first one under the rule of the new Lega Serie B. A total of 22 teams contest the league, 15 of which returned from the 2009–10 season, 4 of which have been promoted from Lega Pro Prima Divisione, and three relegated from Serie A.

== Events ==
On 25 April 2010, Livorno became the first team to be mathematically relegated to the league from Serie A; on the same day, Novara put an end to a 33-year absence from the division by becoming Lega Pro Prima Divisione/A champions in advance of two weeks.

On 2 May 2010, Siena became the second team to get relegated from Serie A, putting an end to a seven-year consecutive stay in the Italian top flight.

On 9 May 2010, Atalanta were mathematically relegated into the Serie B; on the same day, Portogruaro won the Lega Pro Prima Divisione/B title, thus ensuring themselves participation in the Italian second tier in a historical first team for the small Venetian club.

On 13 June 2010, Varese and Pescara became the other two teams promoted from the third tier as playoff winners.

On 22 June 2010, it was announced that newly promoted Portogruaro would play the first games of the new season at the Stadio Friuli in Udine, in order to allow renovation plans for the club's home stadium in Portogruaro, which is considered too small for Serie B standards; according to the club's general manager Paolo Mio, Portogruaro is expected to play at least the first four or five home games in Udine.

On the deadline of 7 July, Ascoli and Ancona ultimately failed to fulfill the financial requirements and were expelled from the league, while Portogruaro was expelled because the club did not fulfill bureaucratic requirements. On July 16, 2010 the Federal Council readmitted Ascoli and Portoguraro to Serie B championship, and excluded Ancona, who subsequently announced their intention to appeal the decision to the Italian Olympic Committee.

On 23 July, Ancona's appeal was rejected, but the club filed another appeal to an administrative court in Rome. Such appeal was rejected on 3 August, thus formalizing Ancona's exclusion from the league. On 4 August, the Federal Council decided to bring back Triestina to fill the vacancy.

On 28 October, the Venice prefecture signed the authorization that allowed Portosummaga to play its home matches at the Stadio Piergiovanni Mecchia, which had undergone renovation works during the summer, including the installation of a new stand.

== Teams ==
Location of teams in Serie B 2010–11

=== Stadiums and locations ===
Club	City	Stadium	Capacity	2009–10 season
AlbinoLeffe	Albino and Leffe (playing in Bergamo)	Atleti Azzurri d'Italia	26,393	11th in Serie B
Ascoli	Ascoli Piceno	Cino e Lillo Del Duca	20,000	9th in Serie B
Atalanta	Bergamo	Atleti Azzurri d'Italia	26,393	18th in Serie A
Cittadella	Cittadella	Pier Cesare Tombolato	7,500	6th in Serie B
Crotone	Crotone	Ezio Scida	9,631	8th in Serie B
Empoli	Empoli	Carlo Castellani	19,795	10th in Serie B
Frosinone	Frosinone	Matusa	9,680	16th in Serie B
Grosseto	Grosseto	Carlo Zecchini	9,909	7th in Serie B
Livorno	Livorno	Armando Picchi	19,238	20th in Serie A
Modena	Modena	Alberto Braglia	20,507	12th in Serie B
Novara	Novara	Silvio Piola	10,106	Lega Pro Prima Divisione/A Champions
Padova	Padua	Euganeo	32,336	19th in Serie B
Pescara	Pescara	Adriatico	24,500	Lega Pro Prima Divisione/B Playoff Winners
Piacenza	Piacenza	Leonardo Garilli	21,668	15th in Serie B
Portogruaro	Portogruaro	Piergiovanni Mecchia^{1}	3,335	Lega Pro Prima Divisione/B Champions
Reggina	Reggio Calabria	Oreste Granillo	27,454	13th in Serie B
Sassuolo	Sassuolo (playing in Modena)	Alberto Braglia	20,507	4th in Serie B
Siena	Siena	Artemio Franchi	15,373	19th in Serie A
Torino	Turin	Olimpico di Torino	27,994	5th in Serie B
Triestina	Trieste	Nereo Rocco	32,454	18th in Serie B
Varese	Varese	Franco Ossola	8,213	Lega Pro Prima Divisione/A Playoff Winners
Vicenza	Vicenza	Romeo Menti	17,163	14th in Serie B

^{1}Portogruaro played the first 5 home matches at Stadio Friuli in Udine.

=== Personnel and kits ===
Team	President	Manager	Kit manufacturer	Shirt sponsor	
Team	President	Manager	Kit manufacturer	Main	Other(s)
AlbinoLeffe	(Italy) Gianfranco Andreoletti	(Italy) Daniele Fortunato	Acerbis	UBI Assicurazioni	List: Front: Studio Casa Agenzie Immobiliari; Shorts: Carrefour Market
Ascoli	(Italy) Roberto Benigni	(Italy) Fabrizio Castori	Legea	Carisap	List: Front: CIAM; Shorts: Merrell
Atalanta	(Italy) Antonio Percassi	(Italy) Stefano Colantuono	Erreà	Axa	List: Front: Daihatsu; Shorts: SuisseGas
Cittadella	(Italy) Andrea Gabrielli	(Italy) Claudio Foscarini	Garman	Siderurgica Gabrielli	List: Front: None; Shorts: Metalservice
Crotone	(Italy) Salvatore Gualtieri	(Italy) Leonardo Menichini	Zeus	Sovreco	List: Front: None; Shorts: Ford Vumbaca Group
Empoli	(Italy) Fabrizio Corsi	(Italy) Alfredo Aglietti	Asics	NGM Mobile	List: Front: Computer Gross; Shorts: None
Frosinone	(Italy) Maurizio Stirpe	(Italy) Salvatore Campilongo	Legea	Banca Popolare del Frusinate	List: Front: Provincia di Frosinone; Shorts: None
Grosseto	(Italy) Piero Camilli	(Italy) Michele Serena	Erreà	Industria Lavorazione Carni Ovine	List: Front: Banca della Maremma; Shorts: Barbini Piante
Livorno	(Italy) Aldo Spinelli	(Italy) Walter Novellino	Legea	Banca Carige	None
Modena	(Italy) Ninetto Sgarbi	(Italy) Cristiano Bergodi	Givova	CPL Concordia	List: Front: Immergas; Shorts: None
Novara	(Italy) Carlo Accornero	(Italy) Attilio Tesser	Sportika	Banca Popolare di Novara	List: Front: Intesa pour Homme; Shorts: Intesa pour Homme
Padova	(Italy) Marcello Cestaro	(Italy) Alessandro Dal Canto	Lotto	Famila	List: Front: Cassa di Risparmio del Veneto; Shorts: Wüber
Pescara	(Italy) Giuseppe De Cecco	(Italy) Eusebio Di Francesco	Legea	Pail Serramenti	List: Front: Humangest; Shorts: None
Piacenza	(Italy) Fabrizio Garilli	(Italy) Armando Madonna	Macron	UNICEF	List: Front: Banca di Piacenza; Shorts: None
Portogruaro	(Italy) Francesco Mio	(Italy) Andrea Agostinelli	Givova	CAP Arreghini	List: Front: Gruppo Autostar; Shorts: None
Reggina	(Italy) Pasquale Foti	(Italy) Gianluca Atzori	Onze	Provincia di Reggio Calabria / Zappalà / La Fabbrica dello Sport / Canale Group / Mobilya Design / Progetto5 / Goalsbet Italia	List: Front: Stocco&Stocco; Shorts: Canale Group
Sassuolo	(Italy) Carlo Rossi	(Italy) Paolo Mandelli	Sportika	Mapei	None
Siena	(Italy) Massimo Mezzaroma	(Italy) Antonio Conte	Kappa	Banca Monte dei Paschi	None
Torino	(Italy) Urbano Cairo	(Italy) Franco Lerda	Kappa	Italporte	List: Front: Dahlia TV / Fratelli Beretta; Shorts: MG.K Vis
Triestina	(Italy) Stefano Fantinel	(Italy) Sandro Salvioni	Legea	Fantinel (Home) & Testa & Molinaro (Away)	List: Front: Testa & Molinaro (Home) & Fantinel (Away) / Friuli-Venezia Giulia; Shorts: None
Varese	(Italy) Antonio Rosati	(Italy) Giuseppe Sannino	Onze	Oro in Euro	List: Front: Gruppo Ing. Claudio Salini; Shorts: Pulirapida
Vicenza	(Italy) Danilo Preto	(Italy) Rolando Maran	Max Sport	Banca Popolare di Vicenza	List: Front: None; Shorts: Industrie Grafiche Vicentine

== Managerial changes ==
=== Before the start of the season ===
Team	Outgoing manager	Manner of departure	Date of vacancy	Replaced by	Date of appointment
Ascoli	Giuseppe Pillon	End of contract	1 July 2010	Elio Gustinetti	1 July 2010
Siena	Alberto Malesani	End of contract	1 July 2010	Antonio Conte	1 July 2010
Livorno	Gennaro Ruotolo	End of caretaker spell	1 July 2010	Giuseppe Pillon	1 July 2010
Empoli	Salvatore Campilongo	End of contract	1 July 2010	Alfredo Aglietti	1 July 2010
Piacenza	Massimo Ficcadenti	End of contract	1 July 2010	Armando Madonna	7 July 2010
Sassuolo	Stefano Pioli	Mutual consent	1 July 2010	Daniele Arrigoni	1 July 2010
Torino	Stefano Colantuono	Resigned	1 July 2010	Franco Lerda	1 July 2010
Atalanta	Bortolo Mutti	End of contract	1 July 2010	Stefano Colantuono	1 July 2010
Crotone	Franco Lerda	End of contract	1 July 2010	Leonardo Menichini	1 July 2010
Reggina	Roberto Breda	End of contract	1 July 2010	Gianluca Atzori	1 July 2010
Padova	Carlo Sabatini	End of contract	1 July 2010	Alessandro Calori	2 July 2010
Portoguraro	Alessandro Calori	Mutual consent	2 July 2010	Eugenio Corini	5 July 2010
Grosseto	Maurizio Sarri	End of contract	1 July 2010	Luigi Apolloni	6 July 2010
Modena	Luigi Apolloni	End of contract	1 July 2010	Cristiano Bergodi	12 July 2010
Portogruaro	Eugenio Corini	Resigned	17 July 2010	Fabio Viviani	19 July 2010

=== During the regular season ===
Team	Outgoing manager	Manner of departure	Date of vacancy	Replaced by	Date of appointment
Grosseto	Luigi Apolloni	Sacked	27 September 2010	Francesco Moriero	27 September 2010
Sassuolo	Daniele Arrigoni	Sacked	3 October 2010	Angelo Gregucci	3 October 2010
Ascoli	Elio Gustinetti	Sacked	3 November 2010	Fabrizio Castori	3 November 2010
Crotone	Leonardo Menichini	Sacked	27 November 2010	Eugenio Corini	27 November 2010
Portogruaro	Fabio Viviani	Sacked	29 November 2010	Andrea Agostinelli	3 December 2010
Triestina	Ivo Iaconi	Sacked	23 December 2010	Sandro Salvioni	23 December 2010
Frosinone	Guido Carboni	Sacked	8 January 2011	Salvatore Campilongo	8 January 2011
Grosseto	Francesco Moriero	Sacked	12 January 2011	Michele Serena	13 January 2011
AlbinoLeffe	Emiliano Mondonico	Sick leave	29 January 2011	Daniele Fortunato (a.i.)	29 January 2011
Livorno	Giuseppe Pillon	Sacked	14 January 2011	Walter Novellino	14 January 2011
AlbinoLeffe	Daniele Fortunato (a.i.)	End of sick leave	15 February 2011	Emiliano Mondonico	15 February 2011
Crotone	Eugenio Corini	Sacked	20 February 2011	Leonardo Menichini	20 February 2011
Torino	Franco Lerda	Sacked	9 March 2011	Giuseppe Papadopulo	9 March 2011
Padova	Alessandro Calori	Sacked	15 March 2011	Alessandro Dal Canto (caretaker)	15 March 2011
Torino	Giuseppe Papadopulo	Sacked	20 March 2011	Franco Lerda	20 March 2011
Sassuolo	Angelo Gregucci	Sacked	9 May 2011	Paolo Mandelli (caretaker)	9 May 2011

== League table ==
Pos	Team	Pld	W	D	L	GF	GA	GD	Pts	Promotion or relegation
1	Atalanta (C, P)	42	22	13	7	61	35	+26	79	Promotion to Serie A
2	Siena (P)	42	21	14	7	67	35	+32	77	Promotion to Serie A
3	Novara (O, P)	42	18	16	8	63	38	+25	70	Qualification to promotion play-offs
4	Varese	42	16	20	6	51	34	+17	68	Qualification to promotion play-offs
5	Padova	42	15	17	10	63	48	+15	62	Qualification to promotion play-offs
6	Reggina	42	15	16	11	46	40	+6	61	Qualification to promotion play-offs
7	Livorno	42	15	14	13	49	46	+3	59	
8	Torino	42	15	13	14	49	48	+1	58	
9	Empoli	42	13	18	11	46	39	+7	57	
10	Modena	42	12	19	11	46	51	−5	55	
11	Crotone	42	13	15	14	45	50	−5	54 (Note: CRO 1–2 VIC ; VIC 1–2 CRO)	
12	Vicenza	42	15	9	18	44	54	−10	54	
13	Pescara	42	14	11	17	44	48	−4	53	
14	Cittadella	42	12	15	15	50	54	−4	51 (Note: CIT: 6 pts ; GRO: 5 pts ; SAS: 3 pts)	
15	Grosseto	42	12	15	15	43	50	−7	51	
16	Sassuolo	42	13	12	17	42	46	−4	51	
17	Ascoli (Note: Ascoli was docked 6 points.)	42	14	14	14	44	48	−4	50	
18	AlbinoLeffe	42	13	10	19	55	66	−11	49	Qualification to relegation play-offs
19	Piacenza (R)	42	11	13	18	50	63	−13	46	Qualification to relegation play-offs
20	Triestina (R)	42	8	16	18	34	57	−23	40 (Note: TRI 0–0 POR ; POR 1–2 TRI)	Relegation to Lega Pro Prima Divisione
21	Portogruaro (R)	42	10	10	22	39	63	−24	40	Relegation to Lega Pro Prima Divisione
22	Frosinone (R)	42	8	14	20	46	64	−18	38	Relegation to Lega Pro Prima Divisione

Source: Lega Serie B
Rules for classification: 1st points, 2nd head-to-head, 3rd goal difference, 4th goals for
(C) Champions; (O) Play-off winners; (P) Promoted; (R) Relegated

== Results ==
Home \ Away	ALB	ASC	ATA	CIT	CRO	EMP	FRO	GRO	LIV	MOD	NOV	PAD	PES	PIA	POR	REG	SAS	SIE	TOR	TRI	VAR	VIC
AlbinoLeffe	—	1–1	2–3	1–3	1–1	2–0	2–1	1–1	0–3	0–0	3–1	2–1	1–2	3–3	1–0	1–3	3–1	1–0	1–2	1–1	3–1	2–2
Ascoli	2–0	—	1–1	0–1	2–2	0–0	3–1	1–2	1–5	1–1	1–1	1–0	1–0	3–1	1–0	2–1	0–0	3–2	0–4	3–0	0–0	2–1
Atalanta	3–1	2–1	—	2–2	2–0	1–2	0–0	2–0	0–2	1–0	1–1	4–1	1–0	3–0	4–1	1–1	1–0	0–0	2–1	4–0	0–0	2–0
Cittadella	0–4	0–1	0–1	—	1–0	2–3	1–1	2–1	2–0	1–1	0–2	3–1	3–2	3–0	1–1	1–2	1–1	0–0	2–1	4–1	2–2	0–1
Crotone	0–1	1–0	2–2	1–1	—	3–2	4–1	0–0	2–1	3–1	0–3	1–1	0–1	0–1	2–0	0–0	2–0	1–2	1–1	2–1	1–0	1–2
Empoli	3–1	1–0	3–0	2–0	0–0	—	2–1	1–0	0–0	0–1	0–0	2–2	0–0	1–1	2–3	1–0	0–1	3–0	1–1	1–1	1–1	1–1
Frosinone	2–1	1–1	0–1	1–1	2–3	2–3	—	0–0	0–2	1–1	1–1	1–1	1–1	1–1	1–0	1–2	1–2	0–1	1–0	1–0	1–0	4–0
Grosseto	3–3	0–0	1–1	1–1	2–2	2–1	2–0	—	0–0	3–1	0–1	3–1	3–2	1–0	3–1	0–1	1–0	0–1	0–0	2–0	0–0	1–2
Livorno	1–2	1–1	2–1	3–0	1–2	2–1	2–1	1–1	—	0–1	1–0	3–3	1–1	1–0	0–0	3–0	0–4	1–1	2–1	1–3	0–0	0–1
Modena	2–2	0–0	1–2	1–1	1–1	0–0	2–1	1–1	1–1	—	2–1	1–0	1–0	1–0	3–1	1–2	1–1	0–1	1–1	2–2	0–2	2–1
Novara	3–0	1–0	2–0	2–2	3–0	1–1	2–1	2–1	4–1	2–3	—	1–1	1–1	2–2	0–0	3–1	0–0	2–2	1–0	2–0	1–1	3–0
Padova	2–0	3–1	1–1	2–1	1–0	2–2	3–1	3–0	3–2	1–1	1–1	—	3–1	0–0	3–1	4–0	1–0	0–0	1–1	0–1	2–3	4–1
Pescara	2–0	1–2	0–2	1–0	1–0	1–0	1–1	4–2	0–1	0–2	1–2	0–2	—	2–2	4–2	0–0	1–0	1–1	2–0	0–0	1–0	1–0
Piacenza	1–3	2–4	3–2	0–2	2–0	2–1	1–1	4–0	0–1	0–2	1–2	2–2	0–2	—	1–2	3–2	1–0	0–1	1–1	2–2	2–1	4–1
Portogruaro	2–1	2–1	1–2	2–0	2–3	0–1	0–1	1–1	2–0	1–1	1–5	1–1	1–2	0–0	—	1–1	1–0	1–4	0–1	1–2	1–1	1–0
Reggina	1–2	0–0	0–0	0–1	0–0	0–0	2–1	1–0	1–1	4–0	1–0	1–1	1–0	2–0	1–0	—	0–0	0–0	1–1	1–1	1–1	3–2
Sassuolo	1–0	0–1	0–2	1–1	2–0	1–0	5–3	1–1	1–0	1–1	0–1	0–1	2–0	1–1	0–1	3–2	—	4–3	1–2	0–0	1–1	2–1
Siena	2–1	3–0	1–0	3–1	0–0	0–0	3–0	3–1	4–0	2–0	1–1	2–1	2–1	2–3	1–2	2–1	4–0	—	2–2	1–0	5–0	2–0
Torino	1–0	2–1	1–2	1–1	1–1	2–1	1–2	1–0	0–2	3–2	1–0	0–2	3–1	1–1	2–1	1–1	1–2	1–1	—	2–0	1–2	2–1
Triestina	1–1	2–0	0–1	3–2	3–0	1–2	2–2	0–1	0–0	2–2	1–1	0–0	1–0	0–1	0–0	0–4	2–1	0–0	0–1	—	1–1	0–1
Varese	3–0	1–1	0–0	0–0	1–1	0–0	3–3	3–1	1–1	3–0	3–1	0–0	1–1	1–0	1–0	1–0	2–1	1–0	3–0	4–0	—	1–0
Vicenza	1–0	1–0	1–1	1–0	1–2	1–1	1–0	0–1	0–0	1–1	1–0	2–1	2–2	3–1	4–1	0–1	1–1	2–2	1–0	2–0	0–1	—

Source: Lega Serie B
Legend: Blue = home team win; Yellow = draw; Red = away team win.

== Play-off ==
=== Promotion ===
Semi-finals
First legs played on 2 June 2011; return legs on 5 June 2011

Team 1	Agg.	Team 2	1st leg	2nd leg
Reggina (6)	2–2(*)	(3) Novara	0 – 0	2 – 2
Padova (5)	4–3	(4) Varese	1 – 0	3 – 3

(*)Higher seed advances when aggregate score is tied.

Finals
First leg played 9 June 2011; return leg played 12 June 2011

Team 1	Agg.	Team 2	1st leg	2nd leg
Padova (5)	0 – 2	(3) Novara	0 – 0	0 – 2

=== Relegation ===
First leg played on 4 June 2011; return leg played on 11 June 2011

Team 1	Agg.	Team 2	1st leg	2nd leg
Piacenza (19)	2 – 2	(18) AlbinoLeffe	0 – 0	2 – 2

Piacenza is relegated to Lega Pro Prima Divisione 2011-12.

== Top goalscorers ==
23 goals

- (Italy) Federico Piovaccari (Cittadella)

19 goals

- (Italy) Elvis Abbruscato (Vicenza)
- (Italy) Rolando Bianchi (Torino)

18 goals

- (Italy) Emanuele Calaiò (Siena)

17 goals

- (Italy) Cristian Bertani (Novara)
- (Italy) Emiliano Bonazzoli (Reggina)
- (Italy) Daniele Cacia (Piacenza)
- (Italy) Claudio Coralli (Empoli)

15 goals

- (Argentina) Pablo González (Novara)
- (Italy) Davide Succi (Padova)

Updated: 29 May 2011

== Attendances ==
#	Club	Average
1	Atalanta	18,737
2	Torino	11,413
3	Pescara	8,048
4	Siena	7,281
5	Padova	6,362
6	Ascoli	6,012
7	Vicenza	5,740
8	Novara	5,449
9	Modena	5,284
10	Varese	5,012
11	Reggina	4,569
12	Livorno	4,451
13	Triestina	4,379
14	Crotone	3,372
15	Empoli	2,778
16	Sassuolo	2,756
17	Frosinone	2,747
18	Piacenza	2,715
19	Cittadella	2,503
20	Grosseto	2,182
21	Albinoleffe	2,141
22	Portogruaro	1,369
