= 2006–07 Serie B =

Italian football league season

Serie B TIM
- Season: 2006–07
- Champions: Juventus (1st title)
- Promoted: Juventus; Napoli; Genoa
- Relegated: Pescara; Crotone; Arezzo; Hellas Verona (via play-off)
- Matches: 462
- Goals: 1,061 (2.3 per match)
- Top goalscorer: (Italy) Alessandro del Piero (20 goals)

Serie B 2006–07 teams distribution

The 2006–07 Serie B season is the 75th season since its establishment in 1929. It started on 9 September 2006 and ended on 10 June 2007. The 22 clubs in Serie B each played 42 matches during the regular season. The 2006–07 season marked the first Serie B appearance for two clubs, Frosinone and then 27-time Italian champions Juventus, whose involvement in the league was a direct result of not winning competition in the previous Serie A season and the Calciopoli rulings.

SS Arezzo began the season with a six-point deficit and Juventus a 17 point deficit, later reduced to nine-point deficit, due to their involvement in the 2006 Italian football scandal. In addition, U.S. Triestina Calcio were docked one point because of financial irregularities, and Pescara Calcio were penalized one point for late tax payments.

== Events ==
=== Promotions ===
Despite the large deficit at the start of the league, Juventus coasted through the season with ease and became the first team promoted to the Serie A for the 2007–08 season with a 5–1 away win at SS Arezzo on 19 May 2007, with three games remaining in the schedule. One week later, they clinched the title of Serie B champions for 2006–07 with a 2–0 home win against Mantova 1911. Juventus were awarded the first-ever Ali della Vittoria (Wings of Victory) Cup, designed this year for the winner of the Serie B championship.

On the last day of the season Napoli played Genoa. Napoli only needed a draw for automatic promotion, while Genoa needed a win to guarantee promotion. The match ended 0–0 and Napoli were promoted. However, Piacenza only managed a 1–1 draw with Triestina, leaving it ten points behind Genoa. A gap of ten or more points between the third and fourth-placed teams meant that no playoffs would be held, and Genoa became the third team promoted to Serie A.

Both Napoli and Genoa were promoted from Serie C1 to Serie B, and from Serie B to Serie A in successive seasons.

=== Relegations ===
On 12 May 2007 Pescara became the first team relegated to Serie C1 for the 2007–08 season with a 3–1 loss at Piacenza on Day 38 of the schedule. One week later, Crotone was also relegated with a 2–0 loss at Trieste. On the last match day, Arezzo became the third team relegated despite winning 3–1 at Treviso, as both Spezia and Hellas Verona won their games. Tied 2–2 with Juventus, Spezia was only seconds away from relegation, but a dramatic goal on the 91st minute by Nicola Padoin condemned Arezzo and qualified Spezia for the playoffs.

The fourth team to be relegated was decided in a two-legged playoff between Verona and Spezia. The first leg ended in a 2–1 win for Spezia, and a 0–0 tie in the return match condemned Verona to play Serie C1 in the 2007–08 season.

== Teams ==
=== Stadiums and locations ===
These are the 22 teams which took part in the Serie B 2006–07:

Club Name	Home City	Stadium Name	Final Placing in 2005–06 Season
AlbinoLeffe	Bergamo	Stadio Atleti Azzurri d'Italia	18th in Serie B
Arezzo	Arezzo	Stadio Città di Arezzo	7th in Serie B
Bari	Bari	Stadio San Nicola	13th in Serie B
Bologna	Bologna	Stadio Renato dall'Ara	8th in Serie B
Brescia	Brescia	Stadio Mario Rigamonti	10th in Serie B
Cesena	Cesena	Stadio Dino Manuzzi	6th in Serie B
Crotone	Crotone	Stadio Ezio Scida	9th in Serie B
Frosinone	Frosinone	Stadio Matusa	Serie C1/B Playoff Winners
Genoa	Genoa	Stadio Luigi Ferraris	Serie C1/A Playoff Winners
Hellas Verona	Verona	Stadio Marcantonio Bentegodi	15th in Serie B
Juventus	Turin	Stadio Olimpico di Torino	20th in Serie A
Lecce	Lecce	Stadio Via del Mare	18th in Serie A
Mantova 1911	Mantua	Stadio Danilo Martelli	4th in Serie B
Modena	Modena	Stadio Alberto Braglia	5th in Serie B
Napoli	Naples	Stadio San Paolo	Serie C1/B Champions
Pescara	Pescara	Stadio Adriatico	12th in Serie B
Piacenza	Piacenza	Stadio Leonardo Garilli	11th in Serie B
Rimini	Rimini	Stadio Romeo Neri	17th in Serie B
Spezia	La Spezia	Stadio Alberto Picco	Serie C1/A Champions
Treviso	Treviso	Stadio Omobono Tenni	19th in Serie A
Triestina	Trieste	Stadio Nereo Rocco	14th in Serie B
Vicenza	Vicenza	Stadio Romeo Menti	16th in Serie B

=== Personnel and kits ===
Team	President	Manager	Kit manufacturer	Shirt sponsor
AlbinoLeffe	(Italy) Gianfranco Andreoletti	(Italy) Emiliano Mondonico	Acerbis	BPU Assicurazioni
Arezzo	(Italy) Piero Mancini	(Italy) Antonio Conte	Legea	Banca Etruria
Bari	(Italy) Vincenzo Matarrese	(Italy) Giuseppe Materazzi	Erreà	Gaudianello
Bologna	(Italy) Alfredo Cazzola	(Italy) Luca Cecconi	Macron	Bologna Motor Show/Woolrich/Volvo, Istituto Ortopedico Rizzoli
Brescia	(Italy) Gino Corioni	(Italy) Serse Cosmi	Asics	Banco di Brescia
Cesena	(Italy) Giorgio Lugaresi	(Italy) Fabrizio Castori	Lotto	Solo Affitti
Crotone	(Italy) Raffaele Vrenna	(Italy) Guido Carboni	Zeus	Sovreco, Mediaservice s.r.l./Provincia di Crotone
Frosinone	(Italy) Maurizio Stirpe	(Italy) Ivo Iaconi	Legea	Banca Popolare del Frusinate, Provincia di Frosinone
Genoa	(Italy) Enrico Preziosi	(Italy) Gian Piero Gasperini	Erreà	Eurobet
Hellas Verona	(Italy) Sergio Puglisi Maraja	(Italy) Gian Piero Ventura	Asics	Unika Group
Juventus	(Italy) Giovanni Cobolli Gigli	(France) Didier Deschamps	Nike	Tamoil
Lecce	(Italy) Quirico Semeraro	(Italy) Giuseppe Papadopulo	Asics	Salento d'amare
Mantova 1911	(Italy) Fabrizio Lori	(Italy) Domenico Di Carlo	Erreà	Nuova Pansac, Banca Agricola Mantovana
Modena	(Italy) Luca Baraldi	(Italy) Bortolo Mutti	Erreà	Kerakoll, Immergas
Napoli	(Italy) Aurelio De Laurentiis	(Italy) Edoardo Reja	Diadora	Lete
Pescara	(Italy) Dante Paterna	(Italy) Luigi De Rosa	Legea	Delverde, Rete8
Piacenza	(Italy) Fabrizio Garilli	(Italy) Giuseppe Iachini	Macron	UNICEF
Rimini	(Italy) Luca Benedettini	(Italy) Leonardo Acori	Macron	Banca di Rimini (H)/COCIF (A)
Spezia	(Italy) Giuseppe Ruggieri	(Italy) Antonio Soda	Mass	Hyundai, Tecnocasa
Treviso	(Italy) Ettore Setten	(Italy) Ezio Rossi	Lotto	Grigolin, Provincia di Treviso
Triestina	(Italy) Stefano Fantinel	(Italy) Franco Varrella	Asics	Bossini
Vicenza	(Italy) Sergio Cassingena	(Italy) Angelo Gregucci	A-Line	Gingerino (H)/Recoaro (A)

== Final classification ==
Pos	Team	Pld	W	D	L	GF	GA	GD	Pts	Promotion or relegation
1	Juventus (Note: Juventus started the season with a penalization of 30 points, which was later reduced to 9 on appeal) (C, P)	42	28	10	4	83	30	+53	85	Promotion to Serie A
2	Napoli (P)	42	21	16	5	52	29	+23	79	Promotion to Serie A
3	Genoa (Note: Third-placed team Genoa were directly promoted without a play-off being played as they finished 10 points ahead of fourth-placed Piacenza) (P)	42	23	9	10	68	44	+24	78	Promotion to Serie A
4	Piacenza	42	20	8	14	57	50	+7	68	
5	Rimini	42	17	16	9	55	38	+17	67 (Note: RIM 2–0 BRE; BRE 0–2 RIM)	
6	Brescia	42	19	10	13	51	43	+8	67	
7	Bologna	42	18	11	13	52	43	+9	65	
8	Mantova	42	15	19	8	47	36	+11	64	
9	Lecce	42	17	7	18	56	53	+3	58	
10	AlbinoLeffe	42	11	20	11	46	48	−2	53	
11	Vicenza	42	12	14	16	42	43	−1	50 (Note: VIC: 9 pts; FRO: 8 pts; TRE: 7 pts; BAR: 6 pts)	
12	Frosinone	42	12	14	16	44	54	−10	50	
13	Treviso	42	11	17	14	44	47	−3	50	
14	Bari	42	12	14	16	40	46	−6	50	
15	Cesena	42	12	13	17	51	66	−15	49 (Note: CES 1–0 MOD; MOD 0–1 CES)	
16	Modena	42	12	13	17	38	46	−8	49	
17	Triestina (Note: 1-point deduction)	42	11	16	15	37	48	−11	48 (Note: TRI 1–1 VER; VER 0–1 TRI)	
18	Hellas Verona (R)	42	12	12	18	34	46	−12	48	Qualification to relegation play-offs
19	Spezia (O)	42	11	13	18	50	61	−11	46	Qualification to relegation play-offs
20	Arezzo (Note: 6-points deduction) (R)	42	12	15	15	42	46	−4	45	Relegation to Serie C1
21	Crotone (R)	42	7	11	24	36	67	−31	32	Relegation to Serie C1
22	Pescara (Note: 1-point deduction for late tax payment) (R)	42	5	10	27	36	77	−41	24	Relegation to Serie C1

Source: Almanacco Illustrato del Calcio 2008 (in Italian). Panini Edizioni. November 2007.
Rules for classification: 1) points; 2) head-to-head points; 3) head-to-head goal difference; 4) head-to-head goals scored; 5) goal difference; 6) number of goals scored
(C) Champions; (O) Play-off winners; (P) Promoted; (R) Relegated

== Results ==
Home \ Away	ALB	ARE	BAR	BOL	BRE	CES	CRO	FRO	GEN	JUV	LEC	MAN	MOD	NAP	PES	PIA	RIM	SPE	TRE	TRI	VER	VIC
AlbinoLeffe	—	0–0	2–3	2–5	2–3	3–3	2–1	1–1	1–1	1–1	0–0	2–1	0–0	1–0	0–0	2–0	0–0	0–0	3–1	2–1	1–1	0–0
Arezzo	2–1	—	0–1	1–1	0–2	3–0	0–0	0–0	0–0	1–5	0–1	1–1	0–0	0–0	4–1	1–0	4–1	1–1	1–2	0–1	3–1	2–1
Bari	0–0	1–1	—	2–0	1–1	0–2	2–1	1–1	2–2	1–0	1–1	0–1	1–0	0–1	1–2	1–2	2–2	2–0	2–0	0–0	0–1	0–0
Bologna	1–0	1–0	2–0	—	0–1	1–1	2–1	1–0	3–1	0–1	3–1	1–1	2–0	2–3	2–1	0–2	1–3	2–1	0–0	0–0	2–0	2–1
Brescia	1–1	1–0	0–0	1–1	—	4–2	2–2	1–0	0–2	3–1	1–0	0–0	1–0	0–1	2–1	2–0	0–2	1–1	2–1	2–0	0–0	3–0
Cesena	2–2	2–0	1–0	1–4	2–1	—	3–1	2–1	2–1	2–2	0–0	1–1	1–0	1–1	3–3	1–1	1–1	1–0	0–0	0–1	0–1	1–2
Crotone	1–1	1–2	3–2	0–0	0–0	1–2	—	2–3	0–3	0–3	1–3	2–1	3–0	2–1	2–2	0–0	0–2	0–2	0–2	0–0	0–1	0–1
Frosinone	2–0	0–0	1–0	2–1	2–1	4–1	1–1	—	0–2	0–2	2–1	1–1	0–0	1–2	0–0	0–1	2–1	2–2	1–1	2–0	2–1	0–2
Genoa	1–0	3–0	0–0	3–0	3–0	4–3	1–1	3–2	—	1–1	1–0	2–1	1–0	0–0	3–0	2–0	2–1	1–2	2–1	3–2	3–1	2–0
Juventus	1–1	2–2	4–2	3–1	2–0	2–1	5–0	1–0	3–1	—	4–1	2–0	4–0	2–0	2–0	4–0	0–0	2–3	1–0	5–1	1–0	2–1
Lecce	3–1	1–0	1–3	2–1	2–1	2–0	0–1	5–0	3–2	1–3	—	2–0	1–0	1–1	4–1	1–0	1–2	0–1	1–1	2–2	2–0	1–2
Mantova	0–0	1–1	0–0	0–2	2–1	4–3	3–0	1–1	1–0	1–0	4–0	—	1–0	1–0	2–1	1–0	2–1	0–0	0–0	1–1	0–2	2–0
Modena	0–3	1–1	2–1	1–1	1–0	0–1	3–2	2–1	2–0	0–1	2–0	2–2	—	0–0	2–0	1–2	0–0	4–0	1–0	1–0	0–1	1–1
Napoli	1–0	2–2	1–1	1–0	3–1	2–0	1–0	1–1	1–1	1–1	1–0	0–0	1–1	—	1–0	1–0	1–0	3–1	4–2	1–1	1–0	0–0
Pescara	2–3	1–2	0–1	0–1	1–3	1–0	2–3	0–2	2–1	0–1	2–1	0–0	2–6	0–1	—	0–2	0–5	0–2	2–2	2–0	0–0	0–0
Piacenza	1–1	1–0	2–1	1–0	1–2	4–0	2–1	3–0	3–1	0–2	3–2	3–4	5–1	2–1	3–1	—	1–1	2–1	1–0	1–1	1–0	0–3
Rimini	1–1	0–2	0–1	0–0	2–0	1–0	1–0	2–1	1–0	1–1	1–0	2–1	1–1	1–1	2–2	2–0	—	2–1	2–0	1–1	3–0	1–1
Spezia	3–1	3–1	1–2	2–0	1–3	1–1	2–1	1–1	1–2	1–1	0–2	1–1	0–1	0–1	2–2	3–3	3–4	—	1–2	2–2	1–0	1–0
Treviso	3–1	1–3	0–0	1–1	2–0	1–1	1–2	3–0	2–3	0–1	1–0	1–1	1–1	0–3	1–0	1–1	1–0	3–0	—	0–0	1–1	1–1
Triestina	1–2	2–0	1–0	1–3	0–0	3–1	2–0	1–0	0–1	0–1	2–3	0–0	1–0	1–3	2–1	0–0	1–1	2–1	1–2	—	1–1	0–0
Verona	0–1	0–1	4–2	0–1	0–1	2–1	0–0	2–2	1–1	0–1	1–1	0–3	1–1	1–3	2–1	3–1	1–0	1–1	0–0	0–1	—	2–1
Vicenza	0–1	2–0	3–0	1–1	1–3	0–1	1–0	1–2	1–2	2–2	1–3	0–0	2–0	1–1	1–0	1–2	1–1	1–0	2–2	3–0	0–1	—

Legend: Blue = home team win; Yellow = draw; Red = away team win.

== Relegation play-off ==
First leg: 15 June, Stadio Alberto Picco, La Spezia
Second leg: 21 June, Stadio Marcantonio Bentegodi, Verona

Team 1	Agg.	Team 2	1st leg	2nd leg
Spezia	2–1	Verona	2–1	0–0

Verona relegated to 2007–08 Serie C1

== Top goalscorers ==
Last updated 10 June 2007

Scorer	Goals	Team
(Italy) Alessandro Del Piero	20	Juventus
(Italy) Claudio Bellucci	19	Bologna
(Senegal) Papa Waigo N'Diayè	15	Cesena
(France) David Trezeguet	15	Juventus
(Italy) Daniele Cacia	14	Piacenza
(Italy) Emanuele Calaiò	14	Napoli
(Italy) Antonio Floro Flores	14	Arezzo
(Brazil) Jeda	13	Rimini
(Italy) Davide Possanzini	13	Brescia
(Italy) Massimo Marazzina	12	Bologna
(Italy) Robert Acquafresca	11	Treviso
(Brazil) Adaílton	11	Genoa
(Italy) Gaetano Caridi	11	Mantova 1911
(Italy) Massimiliano Guidetti	11	Spezia
(Italy) Francesco Lodi	11	Frosinone
(Venezuela) Massimo Margiotta	11	Frosinone
(Czech Republic) Pavel Nedvěd	11	Juventus
(Italy) Stefan Schwoch	11	Vicenza
(Italy) Matteo Serafini	11	Brescia
(Italy) Simone Tiribocchi	11	Lecce

== Attendances ==
#	Club	Average
1	Napoli	30,150
2	Genoa	19,934
3	Juventus	18,085
4	Bologna	10,949
5	Hellas	9,444
6	Mantova	8,605
7	Cesena	8,561
8	Modena	8,509
9	Bari	7,679
10	Triestina	7,563
11	Spezia	7,374
12	Rimini	6,903
13	Lecce	6,188
14	Crotone	5,800
15	Vicenza	5,704
16	Frosinone	5,072
17	Piacenza	4,711
18	Arezzo	4,135
19	Brescia	3,772
20	Treviso	3,532
21	Pescara	3,299
22	AlbinoLeffe	2,351
