= Denis Godeas =

Italian footballer and coach (born 1975)

Personal information
- Date of birth: 25 July 1975 (age 51)
- Place of birth: Cormons, Italy
- Height: 1.88 m (6 ft 2 in)
- Position: Forward

Team information
- Current team: A.S.D. Cjarlins Muzane (assistant coach)

Senior career*
Years	Team	Apps	(Gls)
1991–1994	Triestina	9	(1)
1994–1998	Udinese	1	(0)
1995–1996	→ Sora (loan)	31	(2)
1996–1997	→ Prato (loan)	32	(7)
1997–1998	→ Cremonese (loan)	24	(5)
1998	Livorno	11	(1)
1999	Triestina	10	(7)
1999	De Graafschap	0	(0)
2000	Treviso	9	(0)
2000–2002	Messina	65	(25)
2002–2003	Como	12	(1)
2003	→ Bari (loan)	11	(0)
2003–2005	Triestina	107	(33)
2006	Palermo	14	(3)
2006–2007	Chievo	5	(0)
2007	→ Mantova (loan)	19	(6)
2007–2009	Mantova	81	(37)
2009–2012	Triestina	100	(28)
2012–2013	Venezia	30	(17)
2013–2014	Triestina	34	(17)
2014–2016	Monfalcone	68	(46)
2016–2017	ASD Lumignacco	30	(16)
2017–2018	Monfalcone	29	(26)
2018-2019	Triestina Victory	23	(27)
2019-2020	→ Trieste Calcio (loan)	10	(4)
2020-2021	Triestina Victory	14	(8)

Managerial career
- 2021-: Cjarlins Muzane (assistant coach)
- * Club domestic league appearances and goals

Denis Godeas (born 25 July 1975) is an Italian football coach and former player who is assistant coach for Italian Serie D club Cjarlins Muzane.

He amassed Serie B totals of 364 games and 109 goals over the course of 13 seasons, mainly at the service of Triestina. In Serie A he represented Como, Palermo and Chievo, in a 23-year professional career.

== Career ==
Godeas was born in Cormons, Province of Gorizia. He started his career at U.S. Triestina Calcio in Serie C1, moving to Udinese Calcio in Serie B in 1994 and spending the following seasons on loan to several teams in the third level.

In the 1998 summer, Godeas joined A.S. Livorno Calcio of division three, returning to Triestina in February of the following year, with the club in the fourth tier. Subsequently, he had his first abroad experience, signing with the Netherlands's De Graafschap but returning home shortly after, joining Treviso F.B.C. 1993 in the second division.

In 2000–01, Godeas moved to F.C. Messina Peloro in level three. He helped to promotion in his first season and scored 15 goals in the following campaign as the Sicily side finished in 16th position, thus avoiding relegation.

Godeas was signed by Como Calcio 1907 in 2002. He made his Serie A debut on 14 September of that year against Empoli FC, and finished the season on loan to A.S. Bari in the second division.

Godeas returned to Triestina for a third spell in 2003, with the Friuli-Venezia Giulia club in division two. He scored regularly during this stint, and was signed by top flight's U.S. Città di Palermo in January 2006, at nearly 31 years of age. He played 15 league games for his new team, adding three appearances in the UEFA Cup, netting against Slavia Prague in the round-of-32 (2–2 aggregate win).

Godeas joined A.C. Chievo Verona in the 2006 summer, as part of the transfer deal involving Amauri. He appeared rarely during the campaign, also being loaned to second-tier side A.C. Mantova and contributing with six goals as they fell short of the promotion zone, finishing eighth with 64 points.

In 2007–08, still with Mantova, 32-year-old Godeas was crowned the competition's topscorer, but his team finished one place lower than the previous season. After one more year, he signed with Triestina in the same division.

In late August 2013, Godeas returned to Triestina. He retired the following year, aged 39.
