= Giovanni Vavassori =

Italian footballer (born 1952)

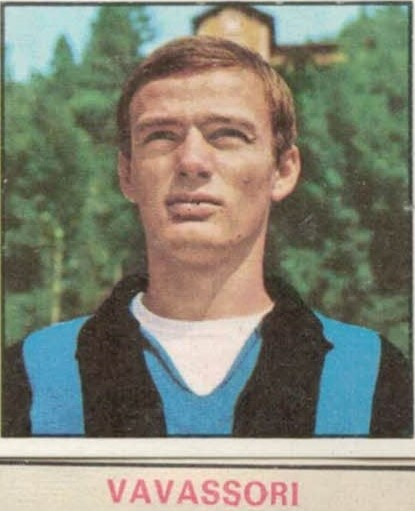

Personal information
- Date of birth: 16 January 1952 (age 74)
- Place of birth: Arcene, Italy
- Position: Centre-back

Youth career
- Atalanta

Senior career*
Years	Team	Apps	(Gls)
1970–1972	Atalanta	63	(0)
1972–1977	Napoli	94	(1)
1977–1982	Atalanta	172	(4)
1982–1983	Cagliari	22	(0)
Total		351	(5)

International career
1971	Italy U21	5	(0)

Managerial career
- 1990–1999: Atalanta (youth team)
- 1999–2003: Atalanta
- 2004: Ternana
- 2005–2006: Genoa
- 2007: Avellino
- 2007–2008: Cesena
- 2010: Verona
- * Club domestic league appearances and goals

Giovanni Vavassori (born 16 January 1952) is an Italian football manager and former player who last managed Verona.

== Playing career ==
Born in Arcene, Bergamo, Vavassori started his playing career with Atalanta, where he made his Serie A debut in the 1971–72 season. A centre-back he played five consecutive Serie A seasons with Napoli from 1972 to 1977, before returning to Atalanta. He left Atalanta in 1982 to join Cagliari, and retired one year later. He also made five appearances for the Italian U21 national team.

== Coaching career ==
Vavassori started his coaching career in 1990 as Atalanta youth team boss. During his stay with the club he won several tournaments and trophies, including a Primavera national title and a Torneo di Viareggio in 1993. In 1999, he was called to coach Atalanta's first team, and promptly led the team into Serie A. In his first Serie A season as head coach, Vavassori obtained an impressive seventh place at the helm of Atalanta, followed by a ninth place in the next season. However, in his fourth season as Atalanta boss he did not manage to keep his side away from the relegation battle, being sacked on 21 April 2003 in a desperate attempt by the club management to save the team from falling into Serie B and replaced him with Giancarlo Finardi.

In 2004, Vavassori was appointed head coach of Serie B team Ternana, but resigned two weeks later, citing a falling-out with his players.

In 2005, Vavassori was signed by Serie C1 club Genoa, with the goal to lead the grifone back to Serie B. He was however sacked later and replaced by Attilio Perotti, and then reappointed at Perotti's place; after ending the regular season in second place, Genoa then won the promotion playoffs under Vavassori and achieved promotion to Serie B.

On 18 April 2007, Vavassori was appointed at the helm of Avellino, another Serie C1 club, to fill the position left vacant by the sacking of Giuseppe Galderisi. In his tenure at Avellino, Vavassori was not able to overtake first-placed Ravenna, ending the regular season with a second place; however, he was able to lead the biancoverdi to win the promotion playoff and achieve his second consecutive Serie B promotion. Originally confirmed as Avellino manager also for their 2007–08 Serie B campaign, Vavassori surprisingly tended his resignations on 16 July 2007. However, Vavassori found a Serie B job just a few months later, as he was appointed as Cesena boss on 12 November, replacing Fabrizio Castori. On 25 February 2008, following a 3–0 home loss to AlbinoLeffe, Vavassori was dismissed from his role as Cesena's manager.

In May 2010, he was appointed at the helm of Verona to replace Gian Marco Remondina, who was sacked after he failed to guide his side to win direct promotion to Serie B following a shock 1–0 home loss to Portosummaga. Vavassori would serve as head coach for the promotions playoffs, with the aim to guide Verona back into the Italian second division, though eventually failed in winning the promotion playoff tournament: his side was defeated by Pescara in the finals, and he was therefore not confirmed in charge of Verona.
