= Stefano Pioli =

Italian football manager (born 1965)

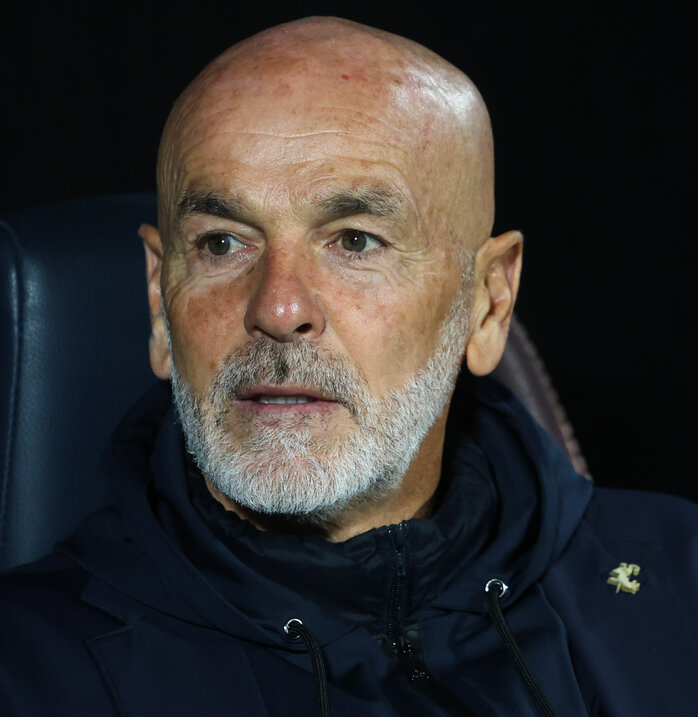
- Pioli managing Al Nassr in 2025

Personal information
- Full name: Stefano Pioli
- Date of birth: 20 October 1965 (age 61)
- Place of birth: Parma, Italy
- Height: 1.86 m (6 ft 1 in)
- Position: Defender

Youth career
- 1979–1982: Parma

Senior career*
Years	Team	Apps	(Gls)
1982–1984	Parma	42	(1)
1984–1987	Juventus	35	(0)
1987–1989	Hellas Verona	42	(0)
1989–1995	Fiorentina	154	(1)
1995–1996	Padova	4	(0)
1996–1997	Pistoiese	14	(1)
1997–1998	Fiorenzuola	21	(0)
1998–1999	Colorno	20	(3)
Total		312	(6)

International career
1985–1987	Italy U21	5	(0)

Managerial career
- 1999–2001: Bologna (U18)
- 2001–2002: Bologna (U20)
- 2002–2003: ChievoVerona (U20)
- 2003–2004: Salernitana
- 2004–2006: Modena
- 2006–2007: Parma
- 2007–2008: Grosseto
- 2008–2009: Piacenza
- 2009–2010: Sassuolo
- 2010–2011: ChievoVerona
- 2011: Palermo
- 2011–2014: Bologna
- 2014–2016: Lazio
- 2016–2017: Inter Milan
- 2017–2019: Fiorentina
- 2019–2024: Milan
- 2024–2025: Al-Nassr
- 2025: Fiorentina
- * Club domestic league appearances and goals

Stefano Pioli (born 20 October 1965) is an Italian football manager and former player who played as a defender.

Pioli has managed several clubs in Serie A, including Bologna, Lazio, Inter Milan, and Fiorentina. He most notably led AC Milan, whose previous scudetto was accomplished over a decade earlier, to the Serie A title in the 2021–22 season. He was later awarded the Panchina d'Oro, for best coach of the 2021-2022 season. In 2022–23, he returned Milan to the semi-finals of the UEFA Champions League before leaving the club at the end of the 2023–24 season.

== Playing career ==
Pioli, a native of Parma, began his playing career with his hometown team, Parma. Successively, he was signed by Juventus, with whom he made his Serie A debut in 1984, winning the league title, the European Cup, the European Super Cup, and the Intercontinental Cup during his three seasons with the club. After being sold to Hellas Verona in 1987, Pioli moved to Fiorentina in 1989, where he spent six years of his career winning the Serie B in the 1993–94 season, before spending two seasons with Padova. After successive season-long spells in Serie C with Pistoiese and Fiorenzuola, he ended his career in 1999 with Colorno of Eccellenza Emilia-Romagna (the sixth-highest level of Italian football at that time; the top level of the Emilia-Romagna regional league system), playing alongside his brother Leonardo.

== Style of play ==
Pioli was capable of playing anywhere along the back-line, although he performed best as a man-marking centre-back, or "stopper," in Italian. Considered to be a promising and consistent player in his youth, his career was affected by numerous serious injuries.

== Coaching career ==
=== Early career ===
From 1999 to 2002 Pioli coached Bologna's youth team (winning a championship with Allievi Nazionali's team), and Chievo's in 2002–03. In 2003–04, he was appointed as head coach of Serie B club Salernitana. He moved to Modena, still of Serie B, in 2004.

In 2006, Pioli was named as Parma's head coach, therefore returning to his home city and marking his Serie A debut as a manager. However, he was sacked on 12 February 2007 after a 3–0 loss to Roma which brought Parma down to second-last place and replaced by Claudio Ranieri.

On 11 September 2007, Pioli was unveiled as new head coach of Serie B club Grosseto, replacing Giorgio Roselli, who was sacked after three consecutive defeats in the starting three league matches, and managed to lead the Tuscan minnows to an impressive mid-table finish in their debut season in the Serie B. He then served as head coach of Piacenza for their 2008–09 Serie B campaign. In July 2009, he left Piacenza to join Sassuolo as new head coach of the neroverdi.

=== Chievo ===
On 10 June 2010, Pioli was named head coach of Serie A club Chievo on a 12-month contract.

=== Palermo ===
On 2 June 2011, Pioli was named head coach of Serie A club Palermo, but he was relieved of his duties just 90 days later.

=== Bologna ===
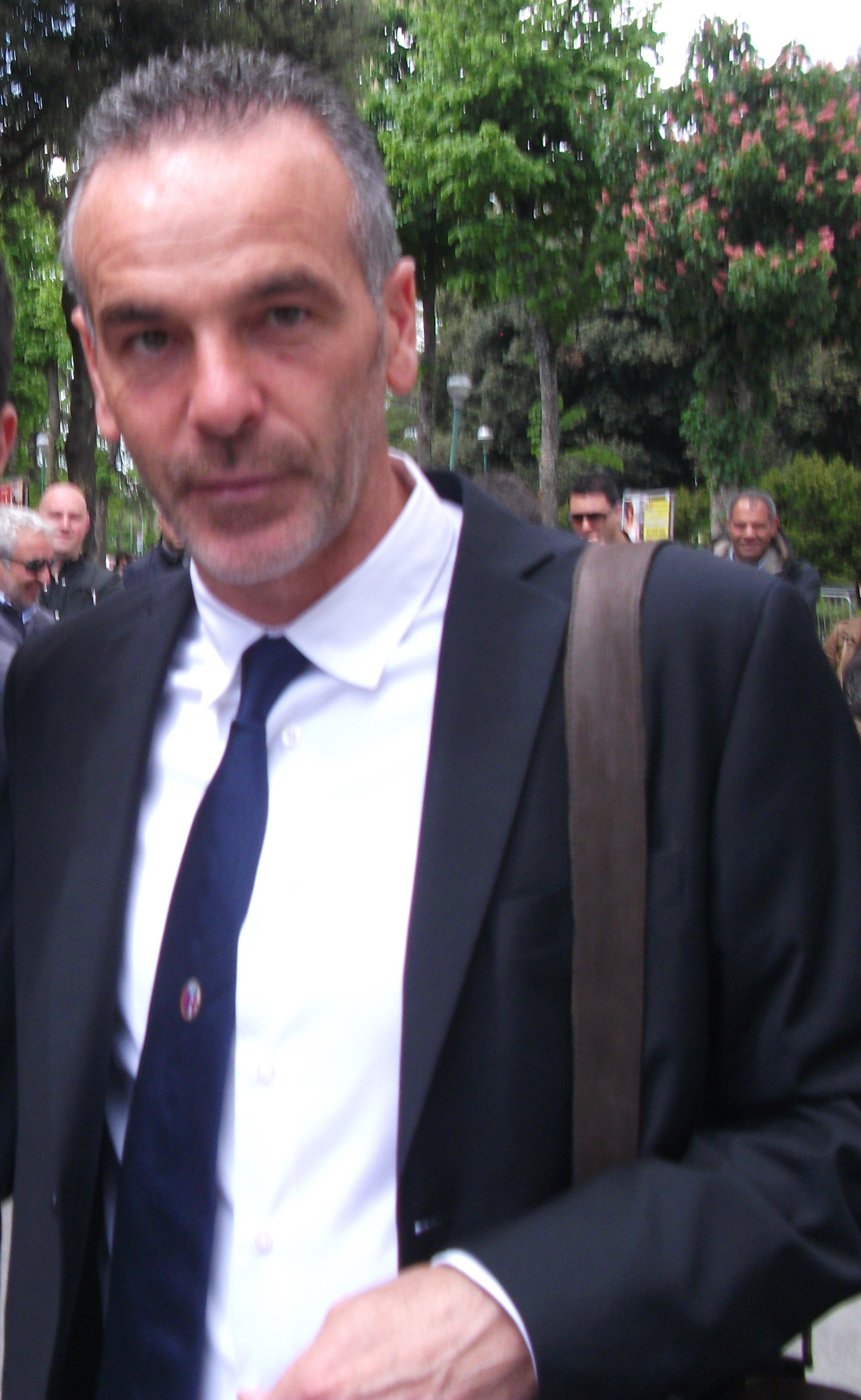
Pioli in 2012

On 4 October 2011, Pioli was named new head coach of Bologna in Serie A, replacing the sacked Pierpaolo Bisoli. After two troublesome seasons with Bologna, both ended with the team struggling in the bottom half of the Serie A table but always escaping relegation, he was removed from his managerial duties on 8 January 2014, with Davide Ballardini appointed as his replacement.

=== Lazio ===
On 12 June 2014, it was confirmed Pioli's appointment as new head coach of Lazio in place of Edoardo Reja. In his debut season at the club, he led Lazio to a third-place Serie A finish. On 11 June 2015, he was offered a new 2-year contract with an additional year option.

On 3 April 2016, Pioli was sacked after a 4–1 home defeat to city rivals Roma.

=== Inter Milan ===
On 8 November 2016, Pioli was appointed as the new head coach of Inter Milan on an 18-month contract. On 20 November, Inter drew 2–2 against AC Milan in a Serie A Derby della Madonnina match, Pioli's first competitive match as head coach of the club. He was sacked on 9 May 2017. Inter had won 12 of the starting 16 Serie A matches that Pioli was in charge of (draw with Milan, losses to Napoli, Juventus and Roma), but this was followed by two draws and five losses in their last seven Serie A matches prior to his sacking.

=== Fiorentina ===
On 6 June 2017, Pioli was named new head coach of Fiorentina. He signed for two years with another optional year. Pioli was in charge of the team when on 4 March 2018 central defender and captain Davide Astori died unexpectedly; to honour the memory of the player, Pioli got a commemorative tattoo. On 9 April 2019, Pioli resigned as manager.

=== AC Milan ===
==== 2019–2021: Early seasons ====
The day after Marco Giampaolo's sacking, on 9 October 2019, Pioli was appointed as the new coach of AC Milan, on a deal to the end of the season. Pioli's Milan finished the season in sixth place in Serie A. The team scored 63 goals in the competition, their highest total since 2013. On 7 July 2020, Milan defeated Juventus 4–2. Milan scored four goals against Juventus in Serie A, last accomplished in March 1989, when the score was 4–0. Milan last defeated Juventus in 2016.

On 21 July, Pioli reached an agreement with Milan to extend his contract as head coach by two years, to June 2022. On 17 October, Milan won 2–1 against Inter. Milan's last defeat of Inter in Serie A was in 2016. Milan last won four consecutive season-starters in Serie A in 1995–96, when Fabio Capello was in charge. Milan scored in 24 consecutive Serie A games, last accomplished in 1973 (29). On 6 December Milan beat Sampdoria 2–1, setting a new club record for goals scored in successive Serie A matches (30).

Following a 2–2 draw with Genoa on 16 December, AC Milan were unbeaten in 24 league games: their longest run since 1993. On 23 December, Milan beat Lazio 3–2, becoming the second side in the history of Europe's top five leagues to have scored two or more goals in more than 15 successive games in a single calendar year (after Barcelona, 18 in 1948). On 9 May 2021, Milan had their an away win against Juventus (3–0), last accomplished in 2011. Three days later, Pioli's side beat Torino 7–0 in an away game, winning by a seven-goal margin, last accomplished against Udinese (7–0) in June 1959.

A 2–0 away win against Atalanta on 23 May confirmed that Milan would finish second in the league, securing a return to the Champions League, last accomplished seven seasons earlier. Milan also set a new all-time record for away wins in a Serie A season, with 16; no side has ever achieved more in Europe's top five leagues in a single campaign. Real Madrid in 2011–12 and Manchester City in 2017–18 also achieved 16 away wins. In the UEFA Europa League, Milan reached the round of 16, where they were eliminated by Manchester United.

==== 2021–22: Scudetto victory ====
As of August 2021, Pioli held the second highest win percentage in Serie A among Milan coaches, behind only Lajos Czeizler. On 3 October, Milan defeated Atalanta at Gewiss Stadium 3–2, recording successive away wins against Atalanta in Serie A, last accomplished in 2013. On 31 October, with a 2–1 win against Roma, Milan became the fourth team in Serie A history to win 10 of their 11 season starter games, after Roma, Juventus (twice) and Napoli (twice). The win also ended José Mourinho's run of 43 home games unbeaten in Serie A.

In November, Pioli reached an agreement with the club to extend his contract until June 2023. In December, his Milan side became the second team in Serie A history to win at least 17 away league games in a single calendar year (after Napoli, 18 in 2017). In the Champions League, the team was knocked out at the group stage, finishing bottom of Group B behind Liverpool, Atlético Madrid and Porto.

On 6 January 2022, when Milan defeated Roma 3–1, they won three consecutive league games against Roma last done in 1996. On 5 February, Milan came back to beat archrivals Inter 2–1 in the Derby della Madonnina after trailing by 0–1; comeback last accomplished by Milan in the derby in 2004. By 13 February, after having defeated Sampdoria, Milan had picked up 55 points in the league: in the three points-per-win era, only in 2003–04 had they earned as many points after 25 games (64).

On 6 March, Milan beat Napoli 1–0 at Stadio Diego Maradona, moving to the top of the league and winning two consecutive away games against Napoli in Serie A, something last achieved in 1981. Milan had also picked up at least 60 points from the 28 season starter matchdays of Serie A for the first time since 2011–12. On 12 March, Milan defeated Empoli 1–0, reaching 63 points at the top of league table. Seven days later, Milan beat Cagliari 1–0; with that win, Milan had scored at least one goal in 15 consecutive away matches in a single top-flight season for only the second time in their history, also doing so in 1967–68 in Serie A. Pioli's side sealed the Scudetto on 22 May, the last day of the season, with a 3–0 win against Sassuolo. It was Milan's first league title since 2011, and Pioli's first-ever trophy. The team amassed 86 points in total, their best tally since 2005–06.

Pioli's tenure at Milan has brought him the praise of several Italian football personalities and pundits, such as Alberto Zaccheroni, Fabio Capello, Claudio Ranieri, Arrigo Sacchi and Adriano Galliani.

==== 2022–2024: Later seasons and departure ====
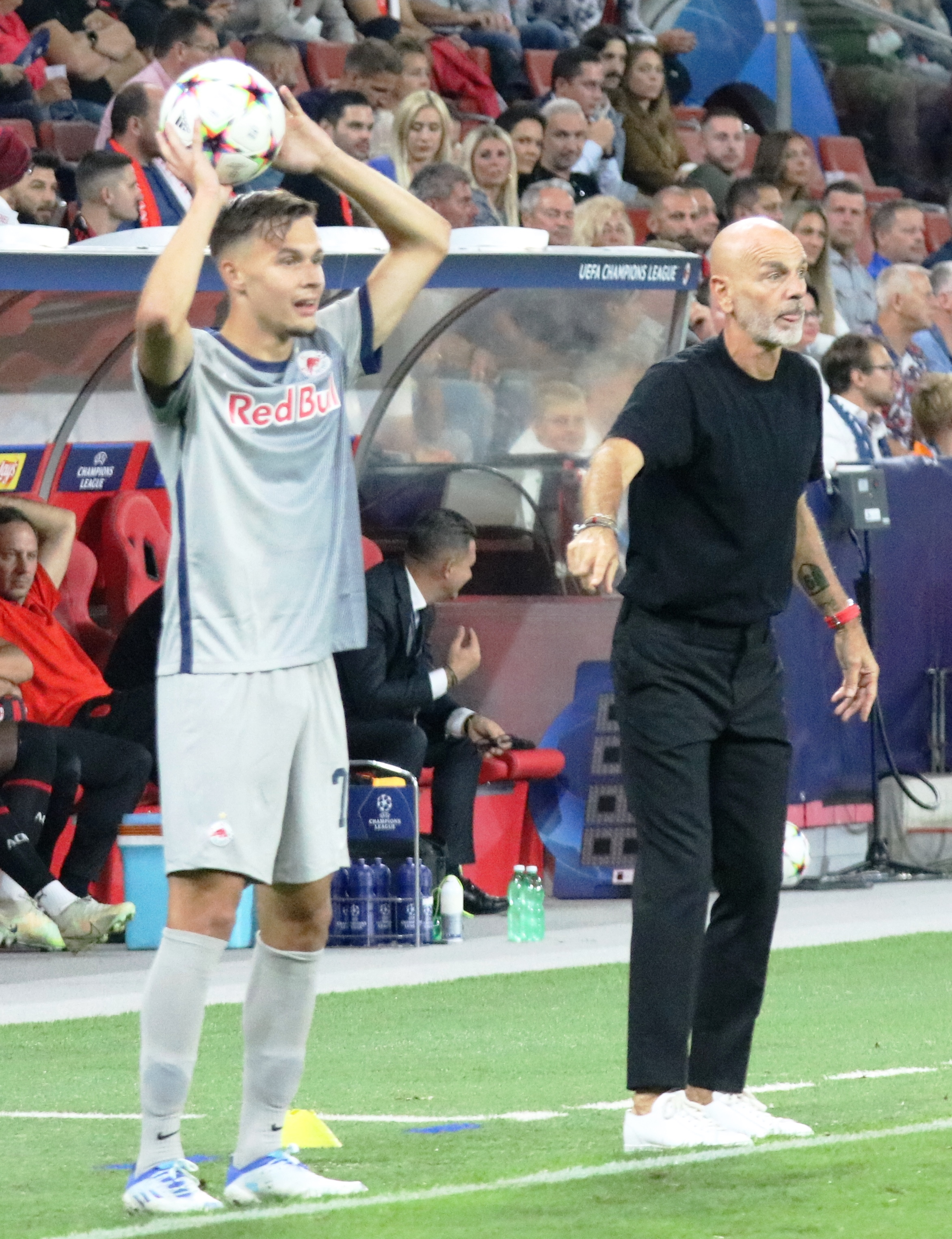
Pioli managing AC Milan in 2022

On 13 August 2022, Milan defeated Udinese 4–2, securing three consecutive wins at the start of the competition for the first time in 26 seasons, last accomplished in 1996. On 31 October, Milan announced that Pioli extended his contract until 30 June 2025. On 8 March 2023, Milan beat Tottenham 1–0 on aggregate, reaching Champions League quarter finals last done in the 2011–12 season.

On 2 April, Milan squashed Napoli 4–0 at Stadio Diego Armando Maradona, inflicting their worst defeat since 2007. With that win, Milan won three successive matches in Naples, last done in 1951. On 18 April, Milan beat Napoli 2–1 on aggregate following a 1–1 draw, reaching the Champions League semi-finals, last done in the 2006–07 season. Milan eventually lost to city rivals Inter 3–0 on aggregate in the semi-finals. On 28 May, he led Milan to qualify for the Champions League for a third successive season following a 1–0 win at Juventus.

Milan started Pioli's final season with an away win against Bologna on 21 August. On 7 October, after a difficult win against Genoa, Milan stood at the top of the league table. However, the team lost the lead in the league table after a 0–1 loss against Juventus on 22 October.

Milan was knocked out of the Champions League group stage on 13 December, finishing third in the group and qualifying to the UEFA Europa League instead. On 20 January 2024, after 3–2 win against Udinese, Pioli reached a milestone of 100 wins for Milan in the league, becoming the fifth manager to achieve the feat after Carlo Ancelotti, Fabio Capello, Nereo Rocco and Nils Liedholm.

On 24 May 2024, AC Milan announced that Pioli would depart after the end of the 2023–24 season.

=== Al Nassr ===
On 18 September 2024, Al Nassr announced that Pioli had signed a deal to coach the team after they dismissed Luís Castro. On 25 June 2025, it was announced that Pioli had been released with immediate effect as manager of the club.

=== Return to Fiorentina ===
On 12 July 2025, Pioli returned to Fiorentina as head coach, marking his second spell at the club.

His second stint as Fiorentina manager proved to be difficult from the very beginning, with the Viola failing to win any of the first ten league games, leading to Pioli's dismissal on 4 November 2025, two days after a 0–1 home loss at the hands of Lecce left Fiorentina dead last in the table.

== Style of management ==
Pioli usually uses a 4–2–3–1 formation, or a 3–5–2 formation, with full-backs or wing-backs who actively take part in the team's attacking plays. During his time at Lazio, he often used a 4–3–3 formation. Due to his passion for basketball, he sought to incorporate strategic elements of the sport into his tactical approach as a football manager.

As a head coach of AC Milan, Pioli initially made use of an archaic WM formation, also known as 3–2–2–3. Although presented officially as a 4-3-3, the formation featured the left full-back, Théo Hernandez, in a more advanced position, whereas the right full-back, Davide Calabria's, attacking presence was significantly limited. Another key feature of this formation was in the center, where two pairs of holding and attacking midfielders formed a square, supporting each other offensively and defensively.

However, with the arrival of Zlatan Ibrahimović in January 2020, Pioli switched Milan's formation to his long favoured 4–2–3–1, primarily in order to accommodate for the ageing yet prolific Swedish goalscorer, in which he would play up front without much of a defensive work other than pressing, alternating between the roles of a classical striker, a target forward, and a false 9. The switch of formation also allowed Hakan Çalhanoğlu, an attacking midfielder in a number 10 role, to return to his preferred position as a playmaker behind the main striker, out of which he had been playing for years in various other formations. Ante Rebić and Ismaël Bennacer, the two high-profile new arrivals struggling to fit into the previous coach's system, were given a few more opportunities to prove themselves; as a result, the former got to play in his favorite position as a left winger and quickly topped the club's seasonal goalscoring chart, while the latter formed an efficient double pivot with Franck Kessié, who also significantly improved the quality of his performances.

During the 2022–23 season at AC Milan, Pioli switched from 4–2–3–1 to 3–4–2–1 formation, forming a back-three of Pierre Kalulu, Fikayo Tomori, and Malick Thiaw, which helped the team play with a high defense line.

Ahead of the 2023–24 season, Pioli once again changed the formation, this time opting for a fluid 4–3–3. With the change of formation, he also brought in a number of tactical innovations, particularly the role of team captain Davide Calabria, who as a right full back began to move in front of the team's pair of center backs, alongside deep midfielder Rade Krunić on the left, thus making the team's shape look like 2–2–3–3 while in possession, with six primarily attacking players.

Through his management career, Pioli is known as a coach who works well with players, a motivator, and who displays tactical flexibility.

== Personal life ==
On 14 November 2020, Pioli, alongside his assistant Giacomo Murelli, tested positive for COVID-19 amid its pandemic in Italy. While in quarantine, Pioli continued to be in charge of the team via Zoom and with the help of another member of his coaching staff, Daniele Bonera. Despite these setbacks, Milan had a 3–1 away victory over Napoli in Serie A and a 1–1 away draw with Lille in Europa League.

Pioli has a son, Gianmarco, who is part of his coaching staff at Milan, working as a match analyst.

== Career statistics ==
=== Player ===
Season	Club	League			National Cup			Europe			Other			Total	
Season	Club	Comp	Apps	Goals	Comp	Apps	Goals	Comp	Apps	Goals	Comp	Apps	Goals	Apps	Goals
1982–83	Parma	Serie C	?	?	CI-C	?	?	-	-	-	-	-	-	?	?
1983–84	Parma	Serie C	?	?	CI+CI-C	?+?	?+?	-	-	-	-	-	-	?	?
Total			42	1		?	?		-	-		-	-	42+	1+
1984–85	Juventus	Serie A	14	0	CI	7	1	EC	3	0	USC	0	0	24	1
1985–86	Juventus	Serie A	14	0	CI	3	0	EC	4	0	IC	1	0	22	0
1986–87	Juventus	Serie A	7	0	CI	3	0	EC	1	0	-	-	-	11	0
Total			35	0		13	1		8	0		1	0	57	1
1987–88	Hellas Verona	Serie A	10	0	CI	?	?	UC	1	0	-	-	-	11+	0+
1988–89	Hellas Verona	Serie A	32	0	CI	9	0	-	-	-	-	-	-	41	0
Total			42	0		9+	0+		1	0		-	-	52+	0+
1989–90	Fiorentina	Serie A	26	1	CI	?	?	UC	10	0	-	-	-	36+	1+
1990–91	Fiorentina	Serie A	14	0	CI	?	?	-	-	-	-	-	-	14+	0+
1991–92	Fiorentina	Serie A	30	0	CI	?	?	-	-	-	-	-	-	30+	0+
1992–93	Fiorentina	Serie A	31	0	CI	?	?	-	-	-	-	-	-	31+	0+
1993–94	Fiorentina	Serie B	31	0	CI	?	?	-	-	-	-	-	-	31+	0+
1994–95	Fiorentina	Serie A	24	0	CI	6	0	-	-	-	-	-	-	30	0
Total			156	1		6+	0+		10	0		-	-	172+	1+
1995–96	Padova	Serie A	1	0	CI	0	0	-	-	-	-	-	-	1	0
1996–97	Padova	Serie B	3	0	CI	?	?	-	-	-	-	-	-	3+	0+
Total			4	0		?	?		-	-		-	-	4+	0+
1996–97	Pistoiese	Serie C	14	1	CI-C	?	?	-	-	-	-	-	-	14+	1+
1997–98	Fiorenzuola	Serie C	21	0	CI-C	?	?	-	-	-	-	-	-	21+	0+
Career total			314+	3+		28+	1+		19	0		1	0	362+	4+

== Managerial statistics ==
As of match played 2 November 2025

Managerial record by team and tenure
Team	Nat	From	To	Record							
Team	Nat	From	To	G	W	D	L	GF	GA	GD	Win %
Salernitana	(Italy)	8 June 2003	13 June 2004	51	16	14	21	42	58	−16	31.37
Modena	(Italy)	15 June 2004	22 January 2006	71	26	25	20	88	74	+14	36.62
Modena	(Italy)	8 February 2006	5 June 2006	16	10	5	1	24	10	+14	62.50
Parma	(Italy)	5 June 2006	12 February 2007	32	9	7	16	31	51	−20	28.13
Grosseto	(Italy)	11 September 2007	11 June 2008	39	10	19	10	46	48	−2	25.64
Piacenza	(Italy)	11 June 2008	5 June 2009	43	14	13	16	48	49	−1	32.56
Sassuolo	(Italy)	12 June 2009	9 June 2010	47	20	16	11	66	46	+20	42.55
Chievo	(Italy)	10 June 2010	2 June 2011	41	13	13	15	43	41	+2	31.71
Palermo	(Italy)	2 June 2011	31 August 2011	2	0	2	0	3	3	+0	0.00
Bologna	(Italy)	4 October 2011	7 January 2014	97	32	28	37	116	129	−13	32.99
Lazio	(Italy)	12 June 2014	3 April 2016	91	44	20	27	148	103	+45	48.35
Inter Milan	(Italy)	8 November 2016	9 May 2017	27	14	3	10	55	38	+17	51.85
Fiorentina	(Italy)	6 June 2017	9 April 2019	74	27	25	22	115	92	+23	36.49
AC Milan	(Italy)	9 October 2019	25 May 2024	240	130	58	52	421	270	+151	54.17
Al-Nassr	(Saudi Arabia)	18 September 2024	25 June 2025	49	29	8	12	115	55	+60	59.18
Fiorentina	(Italy)	12 July 2025	4 November 2025	14	4	4	6	18	18	+0	28.57
Career Total				934	396	260	278	1,383	1,085	+298	42.40

== Honours ==
=== Player ===
Parma

- Serie C1: 1983–84

Juventus

- Serie A: 1985–86
- European Super Cup: 1984
- European Cup: 1984–85
- Intercontinental Cup: 1985

Fiorentina

- Serie B: 1993–94

=== Manager ===
AC Milan

- Serie A: 2021–22

Individual

- Serie A Coach of the Season: 2021–22
- Serie A Coach of the Month: October 2021, March 2022, May 2022
- Serie A Coach of the Year: 2022
- Panchina d'Oro: 2021–22
- Saudi Pro League Manager of the Month: January 2025
