= Elio Gustinetti =

Italian football manager (born 1955)

Personal information
- Full name: Elio Elia Gustinetti
- Date of birth: 29 March 1955 (age 71)
- Place of birth: Bergamo, Italy

Managerial career
- Years: Team
- 1988–1989: Leffe
- 1989–1992: Albinese
- 1994–1995: Leffe
- 1995–1997: Lecco
- 1997–1998: Lumezzane
- 1998–1999: Reggina
- 1999–2000: Empoli
- 2000–2001: Treviso
- 2001–2005: AlbinoLeffe
- 2005–2006: Arezzo
- 2006–2007: Crotone
- 2007–2008: AlbinoLeffe
- 2008–2009: Grosseto
- 2009–2010: Grosseto
- 2010: Ascoli
- 2011: Spezia
- 2013: Lecce
- 2013: AlbinoLeffe

Elio Gustinetti (born 29 March 1955 in Bergamo) is an Italian football manager.

== Coaching career ==
=== From Leffe to AlbinoLeffe ===
==== Leffe and Albinese ====
Gustinetti started his coaching career in 1988 with Serie D club Leffe, ending the season in third place. He then moved at Promozione club Albinese, leading them to win the league and gaining promotion to Serie D. After a ninth and a tenth place, he left Albinese in 1992 and returned into coaching in 1994, again with Leffe, now in Serie C1.

==== Lecco ====
In 1995, he moved to Serie C2's Lecco, where he stayed for two seasons, ended in sixth and second place respectively, and winning promotion to Serie C1 in the latter season.

==== Lumezzane ====
In 1997, he signed for Lumezzane, winning a spot in the Serie C1 promotion playoffs but failing to win it.

==== Reggina, Empoli and Treviso ====
Since 1998 to 2001 he has coached in Serie B Reggina, Empoli and Treviso, seasons all ended with a dismissal.

==== AlbinoLeffe ====
In 2001, he was appointed by Serie C1 minnows AlbinoLeffe, a club founded a few years before following the merger of Leffe and Albinese, both teams previously coached by Gustinetti. In 2003, he led AlbinoLeffe to a surprising and historical promotion to Serie B, after defeating Pisa on playoffs. He served as AlbinoLeffe boss in their two first Serie B campaign, escaping relegation in both cases.

==== Arezzo and Crotone ====
He joined newly promoted Serie B club Arezzo in 2005, leading the side to an impressive seventh place; this was followed by an unsuccessful campaign at Crotone, during which he was sacked in the half-season.

==== The return to AlbinoLeffe ====
He returned to AlbinoLeffe in 2007, replacing Emiliano Mondonico and starting his experience with an impressive 16 points in the first six league matches. He then managed to lead AlbinoLeffe successfully into the top league position, with strong chances of direct promotion; however, a string of four consecutive home losses, and a troubled relationship with club chairman Gianfranco Andreoletti led the latter to dismiss him on 26 May 2008, after a 0–4 home loss to Rimini which mathematically excluded AlbinoLeffe from a direct promotion spot, with only one game remaining in the regular season, depriving him of the chance to attend the promotion playoffs. He was replaced by youth team coach and former team player Armando Madonna.

=== Grosseto ===
In June 2008 he was announced as new head coach of Serie B team Grosseto for the upcoming 2008–09 season. After a very impressive start that led the Tuscans in the higher table spots, results declined throughout mid-season, with Gustinetti being dismissed on 15 February 2009. He was replaced by Ezio Rossi; however, on 25 March Gustinetti was recalled at the helm of the biancorossi after Rossi himself was dismissed due to his failure in improving results.

In the 2009–10 he guided Grosseto again into good results, heading his club to the promotion playoff zone once again. However, another small decline in performances, together with a strained relationship with club chairman Piero Camilli, costed him another sacking in March 2010.

=== Ascoli ===
On 31 May 2010 it was confirmed he would serve as head coach of Ascoli in the 2010–11 Serie B season. His stint with the bianconeri club from Marche however lasted a mere few months, as Gustinetti was removed from his head coaching post on the 3rd of November due to poor results, with Ascoli being last-placed in the league.

=== Spezia ===
In the season 2011-12 he is the head coach of Spezia in Lega Pro Prima Divisione group A until 4 October 2011 when he was sacked and replaced by Michele Serena.

=== Lecce ===
On 14 May 2013, Gustinetti was appointed at the helm of Lega Pro Prima Divisione fallen giants Lecce to replace Antonio Toma after he failed to win the league, ending the regular season in second place behind Trapani. He was hired only for the Serie B promotion playoffs, in which Lecce challenged and defeated Virtus Entella in a two-legged semifinal to ensure themselves a final against third-placed Carpi.
