= Antonio Soda =

Italian footballer and manager (born 1964)

Personal information
- Date of birth: 24 June 1964 (age 62)
- Place of birth: Cutro, Italy
- Height: 1.81 m (5 ft 11 in)
- Position: Forward

Team information
- Current team: Correggese (head coach)

Senior career*
Years	Team	Apps	(Gls)
1982–1983	Catanzaro	1	(0)
1983–1984	Carbonia	31	(7)
1984–1988	Catanzaro	78	(16)
1988–1990	Empoli	54	(10)
1990	Triestina	7	(0)
1990–1992	Bari	47	(8)
1992–1993	Spal	43	(4)
1993–1994	Palermo	23	(8)
1994–1995	Spal	13	(2)
1995–1996	Turris	14	(0)
1996	Catanzaro	7	(2)
1996–1997	Giorgione	19	(1)

Managerial career
- 2003–2005: Sanremese
- 2005–2008: Spezia
- 2008–2009: Benevento
- 2011: Poggibonsi
- 2012: Montichiari
- 2012–2014: Vibonese
- 2014–2015: G.S.D. RapalloBogliasco
- 2017: Recanatese
- 2018–2019: Gozzano
- 2020–2021: Gozzano
- 2022: Imperia
- 2022–: Correggese
- * Club domestic league appearances and goals

Antonio Soda (born 24 June 1964) is an Italian football manager and former forward. He is the head coach of Serie D club Correggese.

== Playing career ==
Soda started his professional career with Catanzaro, where he played from 1982 to 1988 (except for a one-year stint at Carbonia in 1983–84).

He then played for several Serie A and Serie B teams, such as Bari and Palermo. He retired in 1997. Most memorably, he scored on his Serie A debut in Bari's 2–0 home victory against Juventus on 25 November 1990.

== Coaching career ==
In 2003 Soda started his managing career, accepting a head coach job at Serie D team Sanremese, leading his side to an immediate promotion to Serie C2 in his first season and an impressive sixth place the following season.

In 2005, he was appointed at the helm of then-Serie C1 side Spezia; Soda immediately managed to win a historical promotion to Serie B in his first season, winning the Serie C1/A champions after a long battle with Genoa. In his first Serie B campaign, Soda then led Spezia to escape relegation after winning a dramatic two-legged playoff against Verona, being then confirmed for the 2007–08 season. Economic problems however prevented the team from being reinforced, and Spezia ultimately went relegated to the third tier in 2008, with the club declaring bankruptcy a few weeks after the end of the season and being not admitted into professional football.

These events left Soda without a club until November 2008, when he accepted to replace Aldo Papagni as head coach of Lega Pro Prima Divisione promotion hopefuls Benevento. He guided the club to second place in the final league table, losing promotion in the playoff finals against Crotone. He left the club by mutual consent in June 2009.

Since 2 February 2011 until the end of the season he was the coach of Poggibonsi in Lega Pro Seconda Divisione group B.

From 19 March 2012 until the end of the season he was the new coach of Montichiari in Lega Pro Seconda Divisione group A.

In the summer 2012 he was named new coach of Vibonese in Serie D group I.

From 2 July 2018 to 16 June 2019, Soda was appointed as coach of Gozzano, replacing Marco Gaburro in the role. On 20 January 2020, he was re-appointed as head coach of Gozzano once again, after the sacking of David Sassarini. He left Gozzano by the end of the 2020–21 season, as Gozzano won promotion but then renounced their Serie C spot.

After guiding Imperia from February to May 2022, failing to save the club from relegation to Eccellenza, on 31 October 2022 he took on at another Serie D club, Correggese.
