= US Grosseto 1912 =

Italian football club

Grosseto
- Full name: SSD Unione Sportiva Grosseto 1912
- Nicknames: Il Grifone (The Griffon); Biancorossi (The Red & Whites); Maremmani (The Maremmians); Torelli (The Little Bulls); Unionisti (The Unionists)
- Founded: 1912; 114 years ago 2015; 11 years ago as FC Grosseto; 2017; 9 years ago as US Grosseto 1912
- Ground: Stadio Olimpico Carlo Zecchini, Grosseto, Italy
- Capacity: 10,200
- Owner: Giovvanni Lamioni
- Chairman: Antonio Fiorini
- Manager: Paolo Indiani
- League: Serie C Group B
- 2025–26: Serie D Group E, 1st of 18 (promoted)
- Website: www.usgrosseto1912.com
Home colours	Away colours	Third colours

Unione Sportiva Grosseto 1912 is an Italian association football club, based in the city of Grosseto, Tuscany. The club was founded in 1912 as Unione Ginnico Sportiva Grossetana. The team's most associated nickname is grifone, after its logo, depicting a griffon. Its colours are red and white, and it currently plays in Serie C, the third level of Italian football.

The club's most recent success consists of 6 consecutive participations in Serie B between 2007 and 2013, notably reaching the play-off semifinals in 2008-09. It was most recently refounded in 2017.

== History ==
Club logo used from 1995 to 2015

The club was founded in 1912 as Football Club Grosseto, and made its debut in a match played and lost in Orbetello. The club joined the Italian Football Federation only nine years later, in 1921, being admitted in the Promozione division. In 1927, the club changes its official colours from black/white to the current white/red. Since its foundation, Grosseto played extensively from Serie C to the amateur leagues. In 1995 the club was cancelled by the football federation because of financial troubles, thus losing the right to participate in the Serie C2 after having won Serie D the same year. Following these events, Grosseto joined Eccellenza, ending it in fifteenth place being therefore relegated to Promozione. However, two consecutive promotions from 1997 to 1999 brought Grosseto back to Serie D.

=== The Camilli Era (2000-2015) ===
In 2000, Piero Camilli purchased the club with the aim to bring Grosseto back into the pros. In the 2001–2002 season, Grosseto ended as Serie D (Round F) runners-up but were later admitted to Serie C2 to fill a league vacancy. The club successively won Serie C2 in 2004, being thus promoted to Serie C1. In 2005, Grosseto qualified for the promotion playoffs, losing the semifinal to Pavia; one year later, Grosseto gained again a spot in the playoffs, where they defeated Sassari Torres in the semi-finals, but lost to Frosinone in the finals, missing the opportunity to be promoted to Serie B for its first time in history. However, in the 2006–2007 season, under head coach Antonello Cuccureddu, who replaced Massimiliano Allegri after the ninth matchday, Grosseto finally managed to win Serie C1/A following a 1–0 away win at Padova in the final matchday with a goal by Carl Valeri, thus gaining a historical spot in the Serie B 2007-08. Cuccureddu left Grosseto by mutual consent with the club a few days following the triumphal win, and Giorgio Roselli was appointed to replace him for the 2007–08 Serie B club campaign.

The club started their historical first Serie B campaign with three disappointing consecutive defeats which led, on 11 September 2007, to the dismissal of Roselli and his replacement with former Parma boss Stefano Pioli, who led the team to a mid-table finish.

The 2008–09 season started with higher expectations under new head coach Elio Gustinetti; the team started its season showing a very impressive form, but then a result crisis led Grosseto out of the promotion playoff zone, causing the dismissal of Gustinetti and his replacement with Ezio Rossi. The subsequent return of Gustinetti led the team to finish in 6th place and Grosseto acceded to the play-off. The maremmani won the first match against Livorno (2–0), but they lost the second match being surpassed by the rivals (1–4), in a scandal game where Grosseto finished with 7 players and failed the promotion to Serie A.

The 2009–10 season was a relatively good season for the club, which finished in 7th place only a few points off the play-off zone. It was still a memorable season for Grosseto, thanks to their top striker Mauricio Pinilla who scored 24 goals in 24 matches and was transferred to US Palermo, in the Serie A, during the 2010 summer transfer market.

On 10 August 2012, Grosseto was provisionally, not yet enforceable, relegated, by the Disciplinary Commission set up for Scommessopoli scandal investigations, to Lega Pro Prima Divisione because of their involvement in the Scommessopoli scandal. Furthermore, the president of Grosseto has been suspended from all football activities for five years. But on 22 August 2012, Grosseto and its president are absolved by the Court of justice, eliminating the verdict of the first instance and so readmitted to Serie B.

The club suffered relegation at the end of the 2012-13 season, bringing 6 consecutive years in Serie B to an end. This was followed by two years of competing in the third division of Italian football. In the summer of 2015, owner Piero Camilli ended his 15-year tenure at the club.

=== FC Grosseto (2015-2017) ===
Club logo of successor club used from 2015 to 2017

A new club, F.C. Grosseto S.S.D. successfully applied as a successor on 6 August 2015. However, the club folded after a relegation to Eccellenza Tuscany in 2017.

=== Ceri ownership: the return of US Grosseto 1912 ===
On 18 July 2017, local entrepreneurs Mario and Simone Ceri, owners of Associazione Calcio Roselle (a local football club from the city suburb of Roselle) competing in Eccellenza Toscana, came on the scene. Following an agreement with former owner Piero Camilli and leveraging the league status, Ceri renamed the club to Associazione Sportiva Dilettantistica Unione Sportiva Grosseto 1912, thus inheriting the sporting tradition of the city.

The 2017–18 season ended with a third place in Eccellenza Tuscany, followed by a first place and promotion to Serie D the following season. The 2019–20 season marked the return of the club to the fourth level of Italian football and a second consecutive promotion to the Serie C for the 2020–2021 season.

=== Lamioni ownership: 2022... ===
In November 2022, famous local entrepreneur Giovanni Lamioni bought the franchise from previous owner Salvatore Guida. Lamioni gave the presidency role to Antonio Fiorini and called back Filippo Vetrini for the general sporting director place. The city welcomed the negotiation very positively and regained a vanished enthusiasm for the disappointing results of the previous season. Lamioni has announced that he will set up a team that will compete to return to Serie C in 2023–24.

== Squad ==
=== Current squad ===
As of 10 September 2026

Note: Flags indicate national team as defined under FIFA eligibility rules; some limited exceptions apply. Players may hold more than one non-FIFA nationality.

No.	Pos.	Nation	Player
1	GK	ROU	Alessio Marcu
3	DF	ITA	Samuel Postorino
5	MF	ITA	Lorenzo Sabattini
6	MF	ITA	Francesco Cerretelli
7	FW	ITA	Filippo Gerardini
8	MF	ITA	Mattia Damiani (on loan from Arezzo)
9	FW	ITA	Lorenzo Gori (on loan from Frosinone)
10	FW	ITA	Ferdinando Mastroianni
11	MF	ITA	Pietro Fiorini
12	GK	ITA	Daniele Menicucci
13	DF	ITA	Umberto Grandinetti
14	MF	ITA	Kauan Savini
16	MF	ITA	Marco Fiorani
17	MF	ITA	Raffaele Gallucci (on loan from Pistoiese)
18	FW	ITA	Jacopo Lorenzini
19	DF	ITA	Alberto Montini
20	MF	ITA	Filippo Bellini
21	DF	ITA	Lorenzo Gonnelli
22	GK	ITA	Matteo Cabella
23	DF	ITA	Federico Ampollini

No.	Pos.	Nation	Player
24	DF	ITA	Lorenzo Alfani
25	MF	ITA	Tommaso Fantacci
27	DF	ITA	Duccio Brenna
28	FW	ITA	Mattia Gaddini (on loan from Cittadella)
29	MF	ITA	Lorenzo Andreoli
32	DF	ITA	Alessio Ciraudo
39	FW	ITA	Lorenzo Tosi (on loan from Pisa)
46	GK	ITA	Giovanni Leoni
47	DF	ITA	Matteo Mannelli
70	MF	ITA	Francesco Fabri (on loan from Empoli)
72	FW	ITA	Sergio Cosentino
75	FW	ITA	Alessandro Brancato
77	MF	ITA	Emmanuele Lorenzelli
78	MF	ITA	Daniele Amedeo
79	FW	KOS	Adam Hasani
90	DF	ITA	Tommaso Della Mora
91	DF	ITA	Enea Pitti
—	MF	ITA	Edoardo Vascotto
—	FW	ITA	Angelo Antonio Puzzangara

=== Out on loan ===
Note: Flags indicate national team as defined under FIFA eligibility rules; some limited exceptions apply. Players may hold more than one non-FIFA nationality.

No.	Pos.	Nation	Player
—	DF	ITA	Gabriele Di Paola (at Scandicci until 30 June 2027)

== Achievements ==
- Serie C1
  - Winners (1): 2006–07
- Supercoppa di Lega Serie C1
  - Winners (1): 2007
- Serie C2
  - Winners (1): 2003–04
- Serie D
  - Winners (4): 1960–61, 1972–73, 1994–95, 2019-20
  - Runners-up (1): 2001–02
- Eccellenza Tuscany
  - Runners-up (1): 1997–98
  - Winners (1): 2018-2019
- Promozione Tuscany
  - Winners (1): 1996–97
