= Franco Lerda =

Italian footballer and coach

Personal information
- Date of birth: 19 August 1967 (age 59)
- Place of birth: Fossano, Italy
- Height: 1.75 m (5 ft 9 in)
- Position: Striker

Youth career
- 1977–1979: Fossanese
- 1979–1980: Saviglianese
- 1980–1981: Centallo
- 1981–1983: Cuneo
- 1983–1985: Torino

Senior career*
Years	Team	Apps	(Gls)
1985–1987	Torino	19	(1)
1987–1988	Messina	29	(2)
1988–1989	Taranto	32	(3)
1989–1990	Triestina	29	(6)
1990–1991	Chievo	32	(8)
1991–1993	Cesena	74	(25)
1993–1994	Brescia	33	(6)
1994–1995	Napoli	12	(0)
1995–1996	Brescia	16	(2)
1996–1998	Atletico Catania	40	(8)
1998	Alessandria	8	(1)
1998–2002	Cuneo	115	(73)
2002–2003	Canavese	21	(11)

International career
1985–1987	Italy U21	2	(1)

Managerial career
- 2005–2006: Saluzzo
- 2006–2007: Casale
- 2007–2008: Pescara
- 2008–2009: Pro Patria
- 2009–2010: Crotone
- 2010–2011: Torino
- 2011: Torino
- 2012–2013: Lecce
- 2013–2014: Lecce
- 2016: Vicenza
- 2018: Vicenza
- 2019: Partizani
- 2021–2022: Pro Vercelli
- 2022–2023: Crotone
- 2023: Potenza
- * Club domestic league appearances and goals

Franco Lerda (born 19 August 1967) is an Italian football manager and a former player who played as a forward, most recently in charge of Serie C club Potenza.

== Club career ==
Lerda began his career with the Torino youth system, at the age of 16, joining the first team during the 1985–86 season. He made his professional debut with the club on 6 November 1985, coming on for Júnior in Torino's 3–1 defeat to Hajduk in the return leg of the round of 16 of the UEFA Cup. He made his Serie A debut on 24 November, in a 4–1 home win over Pisa, coming on for Schachner. He remained with the club for two seasons, collecting 19 appearances, and scoring 1 goal. He subsequently played in the lower divisions with Messina, Taranto, Triestina (in Serie B), Chievo Verona (in Serie C1), Cesena, and Brescia (in Serie B once again). He helped Brescia to earn Serie A promotion during the 1993–94 Serie B season, also winning the Anglo-Italian Cup with the club in 1994.

The following season, after making two appearances with Brescia, he moved to Napoli, without being able to find the net, and subsequently returning to Brescia for the 1995–96 Serie B season. He later spent a season and a half with Serie C1 side Atletico Catania, narrowly missing out on Serie B promotion. He ended his career after playing with Alessandria in Serie C2, Cuneo and Canavese, in Serie D, and finally, with Saluzzo, in the Piedmont Eccellenza League, retiring after the 2003–04 season.

== International career ==
On 19 November 1986, Lerda made his debut for the Italy national under-21 football team, in a 1–1 home draw against Switzerland. He scored his first goal for the Italy under-21 side on 11 February 1987, in a 2–1 away win over Portugal; these were his only two appearances for the under-21 side.

== Managerial career ==
Lerda had been the manager of a few clubs in lower divisions. In June 2010, he became manager of Torino.

On 9 March 2011, he was sacked by the Torino board and replaced by Giuseppe Papadopulo. However, eleven days later Papadopulo was sacked and Lerda was reinstated as manager. On 29 May 2011, he was once again sacked following the club's failure to secure a spot in the Serie A-playoffs.

In June 2012, he became new manager of Lecce. On 21 January 2013, he was sacked following a 3–1 defeat against San Marino despite the team being in 2nd place in the Lega Pro Prima Divisione.

He was reinstated as Lecce head coach on 24 September 2013, after the dismissal of Francesco Moriero. He was sacked on 27 December 2014 and replaced by Dino Pagliari.

On 15 March 2016, he became new manager of Serie B side Vicenza. He was dismissed in October 2016.

On 26 March 2018, he returned to Vicenza, this time in the Serie C.

On 17 June 2019, he became the new manager of Albanian club Partizani. He was sacked on 15 December 2019 following two consecutive defeats.

On 7 December 2021, he was hired by Pro Vercelli in Serie C. He left the club on 25 May 2022 by mutual consent, after completing the season in seventh place and being successively eliminated by Juventus U23 in the second round of the promotion playoffs.

On 30 May 2022, Crotone announced to have hired Lerda, who had already coached the Calabrians during the 2009–10 season, as their new head coach on a one-year deal, following the club's relegation to Serie C. He was dismissed on 13 February 2023, leaving Crotone in second place in the league table.

On 19 October 2023, Lerda was named new head coach of Serie C club Potenza. His experience at Potenza however turned out to be short-lived, as he was dismissed on 7 December 2023 following a home loss to Taranto.

== Honours ==
=== Player ===
Brescia

- Anglo-Italian Cup: 1993–94

=== Manager ===
Partizani

- Albanian Supercup: 2018–19
