= Dino Pagliari =

Italian footballer and manager (born 1957)

Personal information
- Date of birth: 27 January 1957 (age 69)
- Place of birth: Macerata, Italy
- Position: Midfielder

Senior career*
Years	Team	Apps	(Gls)
1973–1974	Maceratese	26	(5)
1974–1975	Fiorentina	0	(0)
1975–1977	Spal	21	(2)
1977–1978	Ternana	18	(5)
1978–1980	Fiorentina	44	(6)
1980–1981	Lanerossi Vicenza	25	(3)
1981–1982	Ternana	23	(6)
1982–1983	Rondinella	22	(0)
1985–1987	Maceratese	41	(6)

Managerial career
- 1996–1998: Vis Pesaro
- 1998–2000: Maceratese
- 2000–2002: Fermana
- 2002–2003: Alessandria
- 2003–2004: Chieti
- 2004–2005: Frosinone
- 2005–2007: Ravenna
- 2008: Ravenna
- 2009–2010: Virtus Lanciano
- 2011–2012: Pisa
- 2013: Pisa
- 2014–2015: Lecce
- 2016–2017: Viterbese
- 2017–2018: Gubbio
- * Club domestic league appearances and goals

Dino Pagliari (born 27 January 1957) is an Italian professional former footballer and manager.

== Playing career ==
As a footballer, Pagliari played several seasons in Serie A like his younger brother Giovanni. He played for Fiorentina in the late 1970s, before closing his career in lower divisions.

== Coaching career ==
As a coach, Pagliari obtained his most important results managing Frosinone and Ravenna, which led to a promotion in Serie B (season 2006–07).

He holds a football school in the region of Marche.

On 27 December 2014, he replaced Franco Lerda as manager of U.S. Lecce.

On 9 December 2016, he was hired by the Viterbese Castrense.
