= Armando Madonna =

Italian footballer and manager (born 1963)

Personal information
- Date of birth: 5 July 1963 (age 63)
- Place of birth: Alzano Lombardo, Italy
- Position: Midfielder

Senior career*
Years	Team	Apps	(Gls)
1981–1983	Atalanta	19	(1)
1983–1988	Piacenza	169	(43)
1988–1990	Atalanta	57	(12)
1990–1991	Lazio	25	(2)
1991–1992	Piacenza	27	(5)
1992–1993	SPAL	21	(0)
1993–2002	Alzano Virescit	259	(29)

Managerial career
- 2008–2009: AlbinoLeffe
- 2010–2011: Piacenza
- 2011–2012: Livorno
- 2012–2013: Portogruaro
- 2013: AlbinoLeffe
- 2015–2018: Virtus Bergamo
- 2018–2021: Inter Primavera
- * Club domestic league appearances and goals as of 2008-04-25

Armando Madonna (born 5 July 1963) is an Italian football manager and former player.

== Career ==
=== Playing ===
A midfielder, Madonna made his professional debut in 1981 for Atalanta; he then spent five seasons with Piacenza before to return to Bergamo in 1988. He then played for Lazio during the 1990–91 season; this was followed by two spells at Piacenza and SPAL.

In 1993, at the age of 30, Madonna accepted to return to his hometown of Alzano Lombardo, joining local team Alzano Virescit, who were playing Serie D at the time of his signing. He spent a total of nine consecutive seasons with Alzano, being protagonist of the team's rise into the highest ranks of Italian football, including a historical promotion to Serie B in 1998–99. He retired in 2002, aged 39.

=== Coaching ===
On 2003, Madonna was appointed as youth team coach of AlbinoLeffe's Under-19 (Primavera) squad. On 26 May 2008 he was surprisingly appointed as new head coach of the seriani, following the dismissal of Elio Gustinetti, with only one game left before of the end of the regular season. He also led Albinoleffe to the promotion playoffs, defeating Brescia in the semi-finals, but losing 2–1 on aggregate to U.S. Lecce in the finals. He was recently confirmed as AlbinoLeffe boss for the 2008–09 season but removed after a few months due to poor results, and replaced by veteran coach Emiliano Mondonico.

His son, Nicola Madonna, is a footballer and was an AlbinoLeffe player.

In July 2010 he was announced as new head coach of Piacenza for the season 2010–11 in Serie B.

On 21 December 2011 he was announced as new head coach of Livorno. On 6 May 2012 he was sacked.

In July 2012 he was appointed as new head coach of Portogruaro in Lega Pro Prima Divisione.

After failing to avoid relegation with Portogruaro, he returned to AlbinoLeffe in 2013. He was sacked on 27 December 2013.

On 9 November 2015, after a 2-year hiatus, Madonna was appointed as new coach for Serie D side Virtus Bergamo.

On 29 June 2018 he was announced as new head coach of Inter Primavera.
