= Franco Varrella =

Italian footballer and manager

Personal information
- Date of birth: 25 January 1953 (age 73)
- Place of birth: Rimini, Italy

Youth career
- Juventus

Senior career*
Years	Team	Apps	(Gls)
- Rimini
- Jesina

Managerial career
- 1979–1982: Bellaria IM (youth)
- 1984–1985: Bellaria IM
- 1985–1986: Santarcangiolese
- 1986–1987: Forli
- 1987–1988: Boca
- 1988–1989: Forli
- 1989–1990: Brescia
- 1990–1991: Monza
- 1991–1992: Nola
- 1992–1993: Casertana
- 1993–1995: Forli
- 1995–1996: Italy (assistant)
- 1997: Salernitana
- 1997–1998: Reggiana
- 1999: Reggiana
- 1999–2000: Savoia
- 2000–2001: Padova
- 2002–2003: Salernitana
- 2004–2005: Bellaria IM
- 2005–2006: Bellaria IM
- 2007: Triestina
- 2007–2008: Ravenna
- 2008: Ravenna
- 2008: San Marino Calcio
- 2018–2021: San Marino
- * Club domestic league appearances and goals

Franco Varrella (born 25 January 1953) is an Italian football manager and former player. He is best known as the manager of the San Marino national football team.

Varrella was born in Rimini in 1953. His short playing career consisted of a spell with Juventus at youth level before finishing up at Rimini and Jesina.

A lengthy club managerial career followed with spells at Bellaria IM, Santarcangiolese, Forli, Brescia, Monza, Casertana, Salernitana, Reggiana, Savoia, Padova, Triestina, Ravenna and San Marino. He was appointed manager of the San Marino national football team in January 2018.

== Managerial statistics ==
As of 15 November 2021

Team	Nat	From	To	Record				
Team	Nat	From	To	G	W	D	L	Win %
San Marino	(San Marino)	8 September 2018	November 2021	35	0	2	33	0.00
