= Giorgio Roselli =

Italian footballer (born 1957)

Personal information
- Date of birth: 1 October 1957 (age 69)
- Place of birth: Montone, Italy
- Height: 1.70 m (5 ft 7 in)
- Position: Midfielder

Senior career*
Years	Team	Apps	(Gls)
1973–1975	Spoleto	34	(3)
1975–1978	Inter	25	(0)
1978	L.R. Vicenza	3	(0)
1978–1982	Sampdoria	124	(18)
1982–1983	Bologna	34	(2)
1983–1986	Pescara	98	(14)
1986–1987	Bari	24	(3)
1987–1990	Taranto	91	(19)
1990–1992	Alessandria	34	(2)
1992–1993	Pro Vercelli	33	(0)

Managerial career
- 1993–1995: Alessandria
- 1995–1997: Triestina
- 1997–1999: Varese
- 2000–2002: Mantova
- 2002–2003: Varese
- 2003–2007: Cremonese
- 2007: Grosseto
- 2009: Bassano Virtus
- 2010–2011: Lecco
- 2012–2013: Pavia
- 2014: Gubbio
- 2014–2016: Cosenza
- 2018–2019: Sambenedettese
- 2019: Monopoli
- 2019–2020: Senglea Athletic
- 2021: Vibonese
- 2023–2024: Brindisi
- * Club domestic league appearances and goals

Giorgio Roselli (born 1 October 1957) is an Italian professional football coach and a former player who played as a midfielder.

== Career ==
Born in Montone, Roselli began playing football with local side Spoleto. In 1975, he signed with Internazionale, where he would make his Serie A debut against Roma on 25 January 1976.

On 1 October 2018, he was hired by Sambenedettese.

On 24 June 2019, he signed with Serie C club Monopoli. After two league games, one win and one loss, he was fired on 2 September 2019.

On 10 January 2020, he was appointed as head coach of the Maltese Premier League team Senglea Athletic. His experience leading the Cottonera side only lasted until the end of February, when he was relieved of his duties by the club.

On 17 February 2021, he was named new head coach of Serie C club Vibonese until the end of the season.

On 1 December 2023, Roselli returned to management as the new head coach of relegation-struggling Serie C club Brindisi. He was dismissed on 20 February 2024, leaving Brindisi in last place in the league.
