= Fabrizio Castori =

Italian football coach

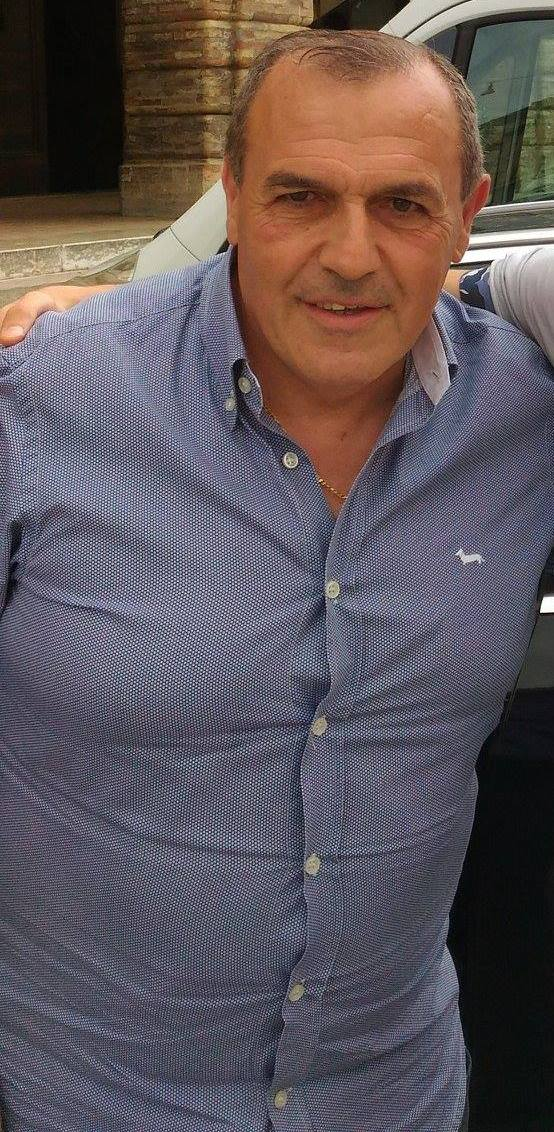
- Castori in 2016

Personal information
- Date of birth: 11 July 1954 (age 72)
- Place of birth: San Severino Marche, Italy
- Height: 1.65 m (5 ft 5 in)

Managerial career
- Years: Team
- 1980–1981: Belfortese
- 1981–1982: San Vicino
- 1982–1983: Urbisaglia
- 1983–1984: Belfortese
- 1985–1987: Camerino
- 1987–1988: Grottese
- 1988–1991: Cerreto
- 1991–1992: Monturanese
- 1992–1998: Tolentino
- 1998–1999: Lanciano
- 1999: Castel di Sangro
- 2000–2003: Lanciano
- 2003–2007: Cesena
- 2008: Cesena
- 2008: Salernitana
- 2009: Salernitana
- 2009: Piacenza
- 2010–2011: Ascoli
- 2012–2013: Varese
- 2013: Reggina
- 2014–2015: Carpi
- 2015–2017: Carpi
- 2017–2018: Cesena
- 2018–2019: Carpi
- 2019–2020: Trapani
- 2020–2021: Salernitana
- 2022: Perugia
- 2022–2023: Perugia
- 2023–2024: Ascoli
- 2024–2026: Südtirol

Fabrizio Castori (born 11 July 1954) is an Italian professional football manager who recently managed Serie B club Südtirol.

== Career ==
Castori was born in San Severino Marche but grew up in Tolentino. He started his coaching career in 1980 at the age of 26 as head coach of the Seconda Categoria team Belfortese from Belforte del Chienti. Initially a boss for amateur teams, having spent three seasons in Seconda Categoria (second-lowest division in Italian football) and three others in Prima Categoria, he led a Promozione team, Cerreto, to reach Serie D in 1990 (there was no Eccellenza division at that time). From 1992 to 1998 Castori coached Eccellenza team Tolentino leading them to Serie C2. In 1998-1999, he won a Serie D league and a Scudetto Dilettanti with Lanciano. After a poor Serie C1 season with Castel di Sangro, he returned to Lanciano in 2000 and immediately won the Serie C2 league. He stayed at Lanciano until 2003.

=== Cesena ===
In the summer of 2003, he was appointed head coach of Serie C1 team Cesena. In his first season, he led Cesena to win the promotion playoffs and the Coppa Italia Serie C; this however was obscured by a 3-year ban on him after having been the protagonist of a riot during the return leg of the promotion playoff finals against Lumezzane. The ban was successively reduced to 2 years following a pardon request by Castori himself; during this time, Castori was unable to serve as head coach but, despite this, he was confirmed as Cesena's boss, with assistant manager Massimo Gadda serving at his place on the dugout until 23 January 2006.

On 11 November 2007, following a 1–4 loss to Rimini in a regional derby and only seven points gained in the first fourteen matches, Castori was dismissed by Cesena, after four seasons at the helm of the bianconeri, but was reinstated at his managing role only three months later following Giovanni Vavassori's dismissal on 25 February 2008; his comeback at Cesena proved however to be unsuccessful, as the bianconeri were relegated to Serie C1 at the end of the season.

=== Salernitana ===
Castori served the 2008–09 season as head coach of the newly promoted Serie B team Salernitana. He was successively sacked later in December, to be replaced by Bortolo Mutti, and then re-called on February, only to be dismissed again on April and replaced by Fabio Brini, who guided the club to safety.

=== Piacenza ===
He was then appointed in June 2009 as the new head coach of Piacenza for the upcoming 2009–10 Serie B season, but was dismissed in November due to poor results.

=== Ascoli ===
On 3 November 2010 he returned into management as head coach of Serie B relegation-threatened club Ascoli. On 2 November 2011 he was sacked because of bad results. Ascoli is currently last in Serie B.

=== Varese ===
Since 12 June 2012, he has been the new head coach of Varese in Serie B.

=== Reggina ===
From October 2013 until December 2013, he had a brief stint as manager of Reggina in Serie B.

=== Carpi ===
On 30 June 2014, Castori was announced as the new manager of Serie B team Carpi, on a one-year deal. He started his Carpi experience in a hugely successful way, leading the small outsider club top of the league table by the end of the first season half and turning them into strong contenders to a historical first Serie A promotion. He was relieved of his duties on 28 September 2015. He was reinstated as manager a month later on 3 November 2015. He was successively recalled to attempt to escape the club from relegation, which he failed on the final weekday of the season.

He was confirmed as Carpi boss for the 2016–17 Serie B season, which ended with the club narrowly missing a top-flight return, being defeated by Benevento in the promotion playoff finals; he left Carpi by mutual consent successively.

=== Back to Cesena ===
On 1 October 2017, Castori agreed to move back to Cesena, taking over at the bottom of the Serie B league with the goal of saving the club from relegation. In July 2018 the club was declared bankrupt and banned from participating in the Serie B.

=== Third stint at Carpi ===
On 18 September 2018, Castori was signed by Carpi, making his second return to the club. The team was relegated to Serie C at the end of the 2018–19 season, and he departed from the club.

=== Trapani ===
On 19 December 2019 he signed with Serie B club Trapani.

=== Second stint at Salernitana ===
After one season at Trapani, he left for fellow Serie B club Salernitana. Under his tenure, the Campanians completed the season in second place, winning direct promotion to Serie A.

Castori guided Salernitana for the first eight games of the 2021–22 Serie A season, being relieved from his duties on 17 October following a 1–2 loss to Spezia which left the Granata at the bottom of the league table.

=== Perugia ===
On 8 June 2022, Castori returned to management as the new head coach of Serie B club Perugia, replacing Massimiliano Alvini. He was dismissed on 19 September 2022 following a dismal start in the 2022–23 Serie B campaign.

On 19 October 2022, following the resignation of his replacement Silvio Baldini, Castori was called back in charge of Perugia. He left Perugia at the end of the 2022–23 season as they were relegated to Serie C.

=== Second stint at Ascoli ===
On 13 November 2023, Castori returned to management as the new head coach of Ascoli, a former club of his, replacing outgoing manager William Viali. He was dismissed on 12 March 2024, leaving Ascoli involved in the battle to escape relegation.

=== Südtirol ===
On 8 December 2024, Castori was appointed in charge of struggling Serie B side Südtirol, becoming the third coach of the season for the club.

== Managerial statistics ==
As of match played 11 March 2024

Managerial record by team and tenure
Team	Nat	From	To	Record							
Team	Nat	From	To	G	W	D	L	GF	GA	GD	Win %
Monturanese	(Italy)	1 July 1991	20 June 1992	34	18	11	5	46	24	+22	52.94
Tolentino	(Italy)	20 June 1992	19 May 1998	220	71	94	55	220	196	+24	32.27
Lanciano	(Italy)	19 May 1998	30 June 1999	40	28	11	1	78	17	+61	70.00
Castel di Sangro	(Italy)	30 June 1999	24 December 1999	20	4	8	8	18	25	−7	20.00
Lanciano	(Italy)	16 May 2000	3 June 2003	123	52	41	30	149	122	+27	42.28
Cesena	(Italy)	3 June 2003	11 November 2007	198	70	67	61	253	257	−4	35.35
Cesena	(Italy)	25 February 2008	6 June 2008	15	2	6	7	13	24	−11	13.33
Salernitana	(Italy)	7 June 2008	6 December 2008	21	7	5	9	23	30	−7	33.33
Salernitana	(Italy)	24 January 2009	4 April 2009	12	4	2	6	15	17	−2	33.33
Piacenza	(Italy)	3 July 2009	10 November 2009	14	2	3	9	11	23	−12	14.29
Ascoli	(Italy)	4 November 2010	2 November 2011	45	15	13	17	48	54	−6	33.33
Varese	(Italy)	13 June 2012	17 April 2013	39	15	11	13	52	51	+1	38.46
Reggina	(Italy)	21 October 2013	3 December 2013	6	1	1	4	5	9	−4	16.67
Carpi	(Italy)	30 June 2014	28 September 2015	50	23	16	11	68	45	+23	46.00
Carpi	(Italy)	3 November 2015	12 June 2017	79	29	24	26	79	83	−4	36.71
Cesena	(Italy)	1 October 2017	24 July 2018	35	10	16	9	50	45	+5	28.57
Carpi	(Italy)	18 September 2018	30 June 2019	33	7	8	18	36	58	−22	21.21
Trapani	(Italy)	19 December 2019	10 August 2020	22	8	9	5	32	30	+2	36.36
Salernitana	(Italy)	10 August 2020	17 October 2021	49	22	13	14	57	52	+5	44.90
Perugia	(Italy)	8 June 2022	19 September 2022	7	1	1	5	5	11	−6	14.29
Perugia	(Italy)	19 October 2022	30 June 2023	29	9	8	12	35	38	−3	31.03
Ascoli	(Italy)	13 November 2023	12 March 2024	16	3	7	6	15	18	−3	18.75
Total				1,107	401	375	331	1,308	1,229	+79	36.22

== See also ==
- List of football managers with the most matches
