= Ivo Iaconi =

Italian footballer and manager

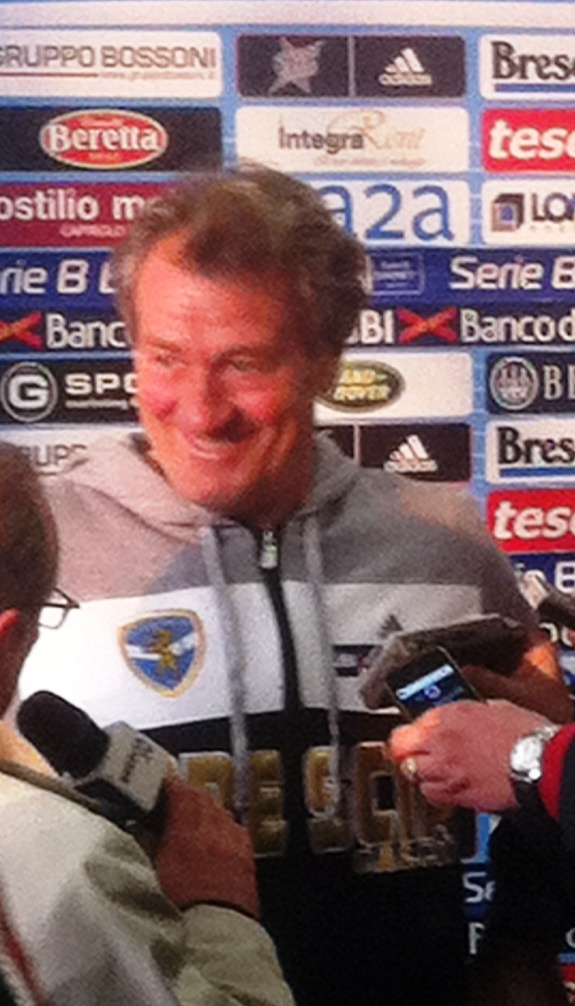

Personal information
- Date of birth: 11 March 1956 (age 70)
- Place of birth: Teramo, Italy
- Position: Defender

Senior career*
Years	Team	Apps	(Gls)
- Giulianova
- Fermana
- Carpi
- Francavilla
- Giulianova

Managerial career
- 1992–1993: Sambenedettese
- 1994–1996: Taranto
- 1996–1997: Trapani
- 1997–2000: Fermana
- 2000–2001: Catania
- 2001–2004: Pescara
- 2005: Pisa
- 2005–2007: Frosinone
- 2007–2008: Ascoli
- 2008–2009: Cremonese
- 2009–2010: Reggina
- 2010: Triestina
- 2013: Carrarese
- 2014: Brescia
- * Club domestic league appearances and goals

Ivo Iaconi (born 11 March 1956 in Teramo) is an Italian football manager and former player.

== Playing career ==
A defender, Iaconi played mostly with Serie C and amateur clubs, starting his career with Giulianova in the 1970s. He retired in 1992 after Giulianova were relegated to Serie D.

== Managing career ==
In the 1992–93 season, Iaconi started his coaching career with Serie C1 club Sambenedettese. In 1994, he moved to Taranto, leading his side to become Serie D champions, but being sacked in the following season. In 1996, he moved to Serie C1 club Trapani, but failed to help the club avoid relegation, ending the season in sixteenth place. The following year he joined Fermana, and won a surprising promotion to Serie B in 1998 as Serie C1/B champions. He however failed to save Fermana from relegation the next year, and joined Catania, trying unsuccessfully to guide the rossoblu to promotion. From the 2001–02 to the 2003–04 seasons, he served as Pescara's boss, leading them to a runners-up finish in their 2002–03 Serie C1 campaign (and subsequent promotion), but being again sacked the following season.

In February 2005 he moved to Pisa in an unsuccessful attempt to lead the Tuscans to a spot in the playoffs. In the 2005–06 season he won his third promotion to Serie B, now at the helm of Frosinone, and led the canarini to an impressive twelfth place the following season. He was appointed as Ascoli's boss in the summer of 2007. He then briefly served as head coach of Lega Pro Prima Divisione outfit Cremonese in the first half of the 2008–09 season.

On 24 October 2009 Reggina announced via their website the appointment of Ivo Iaconi. He was relieved of his managerial duties in February 2010, as he failed to bounce Reggina back into a safer position, leaving his side in second-last place. On 19 July 2010, Iaconi was named as head coach of Serie B club Triestina but fired in December.
