= 1959–60 Serie C =

The 1959–60 Serie C was the twenty-second edition of Serie C, the third highest league in the Italian football league system.

It was the first season ruled by present-day Lega Pro, at time the Semiprofessional League, and the first one under the new three tournament-format North, Centre and South.

== Girone A ==
=== Final classification ===
Pos	Team	Pld	W	D	L	GF	GA	GD	Pts	Promotion or relegation
1	Pro Patria	34	19	10	5	52	22	+30	48	Promoted to Serie B
2	Bolzano	34	18	11	5	42	22	+20	47	
3	Biellese	34	16	8	10	43	27	+16	40	
4	Pordenone	34	14	12	8	38	26	+12	40	
5	Spezia	34	16	7	11	49	36	+13	39	
6	Legnano	34	15	9	10	44	32	+12	39	
7	Pro Vercelli	34	12	11	11	36	35	+1	35	
8	Sanremese	34	13	9	12	39	42	−3	35	
9	Varese	34	11	13	10	33	41	−8	35	
10	Fanfulla	34	11	11	12	33	25	+8	33	
11	Savona	34	10	12	12	33	36	−3	32	
12	Piacenza	34	11	8	15	43	56	−13	30	
13	Casale	34	11	8	15	36	51	−15	30	
14	Treviso	34	9	11	14	32	39	−7	29	
15	Mestrina	34	8	11	15	35	44	−9	27	
16	Cremonese	34	9	9	16	39	53	−14	27	
17	Vigevano	34	8	9	17	33	54	−21	25	Relegated to Serie D
18	Cantieri R.D.A.	34	5	11	18	30	49	−19	21	Relegated to Serie D

== Girone B ==
=== Final classification ===
Pos	Team	Pld	W	D	L	GF	GA	GD	Pts	Promotion or relegation
1	Prato	34	19	9	6	53	27	+26	47	Promoted to Serie B
2	Livorno	34	18	10	6	47	27	+20	46	
3	Lucchese	34	15	11	8	46	28	+18	41	
4	Siena	34	14	11	9	46	37	+9	39	
5	Pistoiese	34	13	11	10	63	40	+23	37	
6	Anconitana	34	12	12	10	36	30	+6	36	
7	Del Duca Ascoli	34	10	14	10	35	35	0	34	
8	Forlì	34	12	10	12	42	43	−1	34	
9	Torres	34	15	4	15	45	47	−2	34	
10	Perugia	34	12	9	13	43	47	−4	33	
11	Arezzo	34	11	10	13	47	55	−8	32	
12	Tevere Roma	34	9	13	12	29	33	−4	31	
13	Sarom Ravenna	34	11	9	14	38	49	−11	31	
14	Vis Sauro Pesaro	34	9	12	13	33	44	−11	30	
15	Pisa	34	14	11	9	51	29	+22	29 (Note: 10 points deducted.)	
16	Rimini	34	8	13	13	32	36	−4	29	
17	Maceratese	34	9	8	17	46	58	−12	26	Relegated to Serie D
18	Carbonia	34	4	5	25	26	93	−67	13	Relegated to Serie D

== Girone C ==
=== Final classification ===
Pos	Team	Pld	W	D	L	GF	GA	GD	Pts	Promotion or relegation
1	Foggia & Incedit	34	20	7	7	52	28	+24	47	Promoted to Serie B
2	Marsala	34	16	12	6	39	20	+19	44	
3	Trapani	34	15	12	7	53	27	+26	42	
4	Cosenza	34	15	12	7	46	24	+22	42	
5	Siracusa	34	12	15	7	24	23	+1	39	
6	Crotone	34	14	8	12	34	36	−2	36	
7	Lecce	34	13	8	13	36	35	+1	34	
8	Akragas	34	12	10	12	34	36	−2	34	
9	Cirio	34	12	9	13	32	33	−1	33	
10	Pescara	34	12	8	14	38	30	+8	32	
11	Barletta	34	12	7	15	33	40	−7	31	
12	L'Aquila	34	10	10	14	31	47	−16	30	
13	Avellino	34	8	14	12	22	30	−8	29 (Note: 1 point deducted.)	
14	Chieti	34	8	13	13	24	38	−14	29	
15	Salernitana	34	7	14	13	19	29	−10	28	
16	Reggina	34	9	10	15	16	31	−15	28	
17	Casertana	34	10	7	17	28	39	−11	27	Relegated to Serie D
18	Teramo	34	8	10	16	27	42	−15	26	Relegated to Serie D

== References and sources ==
- Almanacco Illustrato del Calcio - La Storia 1898-2004, Panini Edizioni, Modena, September 2005
