= 2008–09 Serie A =

107th season of top-tier Italian football

Serie A
- Season: 2008–09
- Dates: 30 August 2008 – 31 May 2009
- Champions: Internazionale; 17th title
- Relegated: Torino; Reggina; Lecce
- Champions League: Internazionale; Juventus; Milan; Fiorentina
- Europa League: Genoa; Roma; Lazio
- Matches: 380
- Goals: 988 (2.6 per match)
- Top goalscorer: Zlatan Ibrahimović (25 goals)
- Biggest home win: Sampdoria 5–0 Reggina
- Biggest away win: Roma 0–4 Internazionale; Siena 1–5 Milan; Palermo 0–4 Catania
- Highest scoring: Udinese 6–2 Cagliari
- Average attendance: 25,324

The 2008–09 Serie A (known as the Serie A TIM for sponsorship reasons) was the 107th season of top-tier Italian football, the 77th in a round-robin tournament. It began on 30 August 2008 and ended on 31 May 2009, with the announcement of the list of fixtures made on 25 July 2008. 20 teams competed in the league, 17 of which returned from the previous season, and three (Chievo, Bologna and Lecce) were promoted from 2007–08 Serie B.

20 clubs represented 13 different regions. The most represented region was Lombardy with three teams: Atalanta, A.C. Milan, and Inter Milan. Piedmont, Liguria, Tuscany, Lazio and Sicily featured two teams each while Friuli-Venezia Giulia, Veneto, Emilia-Romagna, Campania, Apulia, Calabria, and Sardinia were represented by one team each. There was a record number of southern teams in the top division with six teams: Cagliari, Catania, Lecce, Napoli, Palermo, and Reggina.

The new match ball was the Nike T90 Omni.

On 16 May 2009, Internazionale won the league by holding an unassailable lead after A.C. Milan's loss away to Udinese.

== Rule changes ==
The 2008–09 season saw new rules relating to the transfer of player registration introduced. Clubs without non-EU players in their squad were allowed three incoming non-EU player transfers (whereas previously only newly promoted clubs could have three). Clubs with one non-EU player were allowed two such transfers and clubs with two non-EU players were permitted one transfer and a further one if they cancelled the registration of one of their non-EU players or that player gained EU nationality. Clubs with three or more non-EU players were given two conditional quotas with the caveat that the release (as opposed to transfer) of two non-EU players as free agent would only allow for one further non-EU signing.

== Teams ==
Three teams were promoted from Serie B: Chievo, Bologna, and Lecce. The first two earned direct promotion, while Lecce won the promotional playoffs, defeating AlbinoLeffe 2–1 on aggregate in a two-legged playoff final.

Locations of Serie A 2008–09 teams

=== Stadiums and locations ===
Club	City	Stadium	Capacity	2007–08 season
Atalanta	Bergamo	Atleti Azzurri d'Italia	26,393	9th in Serie A
Bologna	Bologna	Renato Dall'Ara	39,444	2nd in Serie B
Cagliari	Cagliari	Sant'Elia	23,486	14th in Serie A
Catania	Catania	Angelo Massimino	23,420	17th in Serie A
Chievo Verona	Verona	Marc'Antonio Bentegodi	39,211	Serie B Champions
Fiorentina	Florence	Artemio Franchi (Florence)	47,282	4th in Serie A
Genoa	Genoa	Luigi Ferraris	36,685	10th in Serie A
Internazionale	Milan	San Siro	80,074	Serie A Champions
Juventus	Turin	Olimpico di Torino	27,500	3rd in Serie A
Lazio	Rome	Olimpico	72,700	12th in Serie A
Lecce	Lecce	Via del Mare	33,876	Serie B Playoff Winners
Milan	Milan	San Siro	80,074	5th in Serie A
Napoli	Naples	San Paolo	60,240	8th in Serie A
Palermo	Palermo	Renzo Barbera	37,242	11th in Serie A
Reggina	Reggio Calabria	Oreste Granillo	27,454	16th in Serie A
Roma	Rome	Olimpico	72,700	2nd in Serie A
Sampdoria	Genoa	Luigi Ferraris	36,685	6th in Serie A
Siena	Siena	Artemio Franchi (Siena)	15,373	13th in Serie A
Torino	Turin	Olimpico di Torino	27,500	15th in Serie A
Udinese	Udine	Friuli	41,652	7th in Serie A

=== Personnel and sponsoring ===
Team	Head coach	Captain	Kit manufacturer	Shirt sponsor
Atalanta	(Italy) Luigi Delneri	(Italy) Cristiano Doni	Asics	Sit in Sport, Daihatsu
Bologna	(Serbia) Siniša Mihajlović	(Italy) Marcello Castellini	Macron	Unipol, COGEI
Cagliari	(Italy) Massimiliano Allegri	(Uruguay) Diego López	Macron	Tiscali, Sky
Catania	(Italy) Walter Zenga	(Italy) Davide Baiocco	Legea	SP Energia Siciliana, Provincia di Catania
Chievo	(Italy) Domenico Di Carlo	(Italy) Sergio Pellissier	Lotto	Paluani/Banca Popolare di Verona
Fiorentina	(Italy) Cesare Prandelli	(Italy) Dario Dainelli	Lotto	Toyota
Genoa	(Italy) Gian Piero Gasperini	(Italy) Marco Rossi	Asics	Eurobet
Internazionale	(Portugal) José Mourinho	(Argentina) Javier Zanetti	Nike	Pirelli
Juventus	(Italy) Claudio Ranieri	(Italy) Alessandro Del Piero	Nike	New Holland
Lazio	(Italy) Delio Rossi	(Italy) Tommaso Rocchi	Puma	Pro Evolution Soccer 2009/Groupama/Cucciolone Algida
Lecce	(Italy) Mario Beretta	(Italy) Andrea Zanchetta	Asics	Salento, Lachifarma
Milan	(Italy) Carlo Ancelotti	(Italy) Paolo Maldini	Adidas	Bwin
Napoli	(Italy) Edoardo Reja	(Italy) Paolo Cannavaro	Diadora	Lete
Palermo	(Italy) Davide Ballardini	(Italy) Fabio Liverani	Lotto	BetShop
Reggina	(Italy) Nevio Orlandi	(Italy) Francesco Cozza	Onze	Gicos, Regione Calabria
Roma	(Italy) Luciano Spalletti	(Italy) Francesco Totti	Kappa	Wind
Sampdoria	(Italy) Walter Mazzarri	(Italy) Angelo Palombo	Kappa	Erg/Air One (in cup and UEFA matches)
Siena	(Italy) Marco Giampaolo	(Italy) Simone Vergassola	Umbro	Banca Monte dei Paschi di Siena
Torino	(Italy) Walter Novellino	(Italy) Alessandro Rosina	Kappa	Movida/MG.K Vis/Renault Trucks, Reale Mutua
Udinese	(Italy) Pasquale Marino	(Italy) Antonio Di Natale	Lotto	Lotto/Automobile Dacia, Regione Friuli/Il Granchio

=== Managerial changes ===
Team	Outgoing manager	Manner of departure	Date of vacancy	Replaced by	Date of appointment
Siena	(Italy) Mario Beretta	Contract expired	27 May 2008	(Italy) Marco Giampaolo	27 May 2008
Cagliari	(Italy) Davide Ballardini	Contract expired	27 May 2008	(Italy) Massimiliano Allegri	29 May 2008
Internazionale	(Italy) Roberto Mancini	Sacked	29 May 2008	(Portugal) José Mourinho	2 June 2008
Lecce	(Italy) Giuseppe Papadopulo	Contract expired	23 June 2008	(Italy) Mario Beretta	23 June 2008
Palermo	(Italy) Stefano Colantuono	Sacked	4 September 2008	(Italy) Davide Ballardini	4 September 2008
Bologna	(Italy) Daniele Arrigoni	Sacked	3 November 2008	(Serbia) Siniša Mihajlović	3 November 2008
Chievo Verona	(Italy) Giuseppe Iachini	Sacked	4 November 2008	(Italy) Domenico Di Carlo	4 November 2008
Torino	(Italy) Gianni De Biasi	Sacked	8 December 2008	(Italy) Walter Novellino	8 December 2008
Reggina	(Italy) Nevio Orlandi	Sacked	16 December 2008	(Italy) Giuseppe Pillon	16 December 2008
Reggina	(Italy) Giuseppe Pillon	Sacked	25 January 2009	(Italy) Nevio Orlandi	25 January 2009
Lecce	(Italy) Mario Beretta	Sacked	9 March 2009	(Italy) Luigi De Canio	9 March 2009
Napoli	(Italy) Edoardo Reja	Sacked	10 March 2009	(Italy) Roberto Donadoni	10 March 2009
Torino	(Italy) Walter Novellino	Sacked	24 March 2009	(Italy) Giancarlo Camolese	24 March 2009
Bologna	(Serbia) Siniša Mihajlović	Sacked	14 April 2009	(Italy) Giuseppe Papadopulo	14 April 2009
Juventus	(Italy) Claudio Ranieri	Sacked	18 May 2009	(Italy) Ciro Ferrara	18 May 2009

^1 Juventus youth sector chief Ciro Ferrara was originally appointed on a temporary basis for the two final weeks of the season. The appointment was made permanent on 5 June 2009.

== League table ==
Pos	Team	Pld	W	D	L	GF	GA	GD	Pts	Qualification or relegation
1	Internazionale (C)	38	25	9	4	70	32	+38	84	Qualification to Champions League group stage
2	Juventus	38	21	11	6	69	37	+32	74 (Note: Juventus finished ahead of Milan on head-to-head points: Juventus 4–2 Milan, Milan 1–1 Juventus.)	Qualification to Champions League group stage
3	Milan	38	22	8	8	70	35	+35	74	Qualification to Champions League group stage
4	Fiorentina	38	21	5	12	53	38	+15	68 (Note: Fiorentina finished ahead of Genoa on head-to-head points: Fiorentina 1–0 Genoa, Genoa 3–3 Fiorentina.)	Qualification to Champions League play-off round
5	Genoa	38	19	11	8	56	39	+17	68	Qualification to Europa League play-off round (Note: Lazio qualified for the play-off round of the 2009–10 UEFA Europa League by winning the 2008–09 Coppa Italia.)
6	Roma	38	18	9	11	64	61	+3	63	Qualification to Europa League third qualifying round
7	Udinese	38	16	10	12	61	50	+11	58	
8	Palermo	38	17	6	15	57	50	+7	57	
9	Cagliari	38	15	8	15	49	50	−1	53	
10	Lazio	38	15	5	18	46	55	−9	50	Qualification to Europa League play-off round
11	Atalanta	38	13	8	17	45	48	−3	47	
12	Napoli	38	12	10	16	43	45	−2	46 (Note: Napoli finished ahead of Sampdoria on head-to-head points: Napoli 2–0 Sampdoria, Sampdoria 2–2 Napoli.)	
13	Sampdoria	38	11	13	14	49	52	−3	46	
14	Siena	38	12	8	18	33	44	−11	44	
15	Catania	38	12	7	19	41	51	−10	43	
16	Chievo	38	8	14	16	35	49	−14	38	
17	Bologna	38	9	10	19	43	62	−19	37	
18	Torino (R)	38	8	10	20	37	61	−24	34	Relegation to Serie B
19	Reggina (R)	38	6	13	19	30	62	−32	31	Relegation to Serie B
20	Lecce (R)	38	5	15	18	37	67	−30	30	Relegation to Serie B

Source: lega-calcio.it (in Italian)
Rules for classification: 1) points; 2) head-to-head points; 3) head-to-head goal difference; 4) head-to-head goals scored; 5) goal difference; 6) number of goals scored.
(C) Champions; (R) Relegated

== Results ==
Home \ Away	ATA	BOL	CAG	CTN	CHV	FIO	GEN	INT	JUV	LAZ	LCE	MIL	NAP	PAL	REG	ROM	SAM	SIE	TOR	UDI
Atalanta		0–1	1–0	1–0	0–2	1–2	1–1	3–1	1–3	2–0	0–0	0–1	3–1	2–2	0–1	3–0	4–2	1–0	2–0	3–0
Bologna	0–1		0–1	3–1	1–1	1–3	2–0	1–2	1–2	3–1	2–1	1–4	0–1	1–1	1–2	1–1	3–0	1–4	5–2	0–3
Cagliari	0–1	5–1		1–0	2–0	1–0	0–1	2–1	0–1	1–4	2–0	0–0	2–0	1–0	1–1	2–2	1–0	1–0	0–0	2–0
Catania	1–0	1–2	2–1		1–0	0–2	1–0	0–2	1–2	1–0	1–1	0–2	3–1	2–0	2–0	3–2	2–0	0–3	3–2	0–2
Chievo	1–1	0–0	1–1	1–1		0–2	0–1	2–2	0–2	1–2	1–1	0–1	2–1	1–0	2–1	0–1	1–1	0–2	1–1	1–2
Fiorentina	2–1	1–0	2–1	2–0	2–1		1–0	0–0	1–1	1–0	1–2	0–2	2–1	0–2	3–0	4–1	1–0	1–0	1–0	4–2
Genoa	1–1	1–1	2–1	1–1	2–2	3–3		0–2	3–2	0–1	4–1	2–0	3–2	1–0	4–0	3–1	3–1	1–0	3–0	2–0
Internazionale	4–3	2–1	1–1	2–1	4–2	2–0	0–0		1–0	2–0	1–0	2–1	2–1	2–2	3–0	3–3	1–0	3–0	1–1	1–0
Juventus	2–2	4–1	2–3	1–1	3–3	1–0	4–1	1–1		2–0	2–2	4–2	1–0	1–2	4–0	2–0	1–1	1–0	1–0	1–0
Lazio	0–1	2–0	1–4	1–0	0–3	3–0	1–1	0–3	1–1		1–1	0–3	0–1	1–0	1–0	4–2	2–0	3–0	1–1	1–3
Lecce	2–2	0–0	2–0	2–1	2–0	1–1	0–2	0–3	1–2	0–2		1–1	1–1	1–1	0–0	0–3	1–3	1–1	3–3	2–2
Milan	3–0	1–2	1–0	1–0	1–0	1–0	1–1	1–0	1–1	4–1	2–0		1–0	3–0	1–1	2–3	3–0	2–1	5–1	5–1
Napoli	0–0	1–1	2–2	1–0	3–0	2–1	0–1	1–0	2–1	0–2	3–0	0–0		2–1	3–0	0–3	2–0	2–0	1–2	2–2
Palermo	3–2	4–1	5–1	0–4	3–0	1–3	2–1	0–2	0–2	2–0	5–2	3–1	2–1		1–0	3–1	2–2	2–0	1–0	3–2
Reggina	3–1	2–2	2–1	1–1	0–1	1–1	0–1	2–3	2–2	2–3	2–0	1–2	1–1	0–0		2–2	0–2	1–1	1–1	0–2
Roma	2–0	2–1	3–2	4–3	0–0	1–0	3–0	0–4	1–4	1–0	3–2	2–2	1–1	2–1	3–0		2–0	1–0	3–2	1–1
Sampdoria	1–0	2–0	3–3	3–0	1–1	0–1	0–1	1–1	0–0	3–1	3–2	2–1	2–2	0–2	5–0	2–2		2–2	1–0	2–2
Siena	1–0	1–1	2–0	1–1	0–2	1–0	0–0	1–2	0–3	2–0	1–2	1–5	2–1	1–0	1–0	1–0	0–0		1–0	1–1
Torino	2–1	1–1	0–1	2–1	1–1	1–4	2–3	1–3	0–1	1–3	3–0	2–2	1–0	1–0	0–0	0–1	1–3	1–0		1–0
Udinese	3–0	1–0	6–2	1–1	0–1	3–1	2–2	0–1	2–1	3–3	2–0	2–1	0–0	3–1	0–1	3–1	1–1	2–1	2–0	

Source: lega-calcio.it (in Italian)
Legend: Blue = home team win; Yellow = draw; Red = away team win.

== Top goalscorers ==
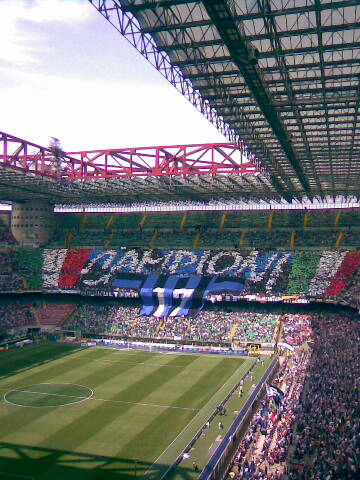
Internazionale supporters celebrate the 17th title

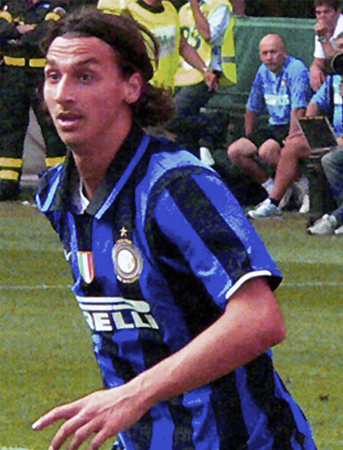
Zlatan Ibrahimović, top scorer of the season with 25 goals

Source: gazzetta.it (in Italian)

Rank	Player	Club	Goals
1	(Sweden) Zlatan Ibrahimović	Internazionale	25
2	(Argentina) Diego Milito	Genoa	24
2	(Italy) Marco Di Vaio	Bologna	24
4	(Italy) Alberto Gilardino	Fiorentina	19
5	(Brazil) Kaká	Milan	16
6	(Brazil) Alexandre Pato	Milan	15
7	(Italy) Robert Acquafresca	Cagliari	14
7	(Uruguay) Edinson Cavani	Palermo	14
7	(Italy) Fabrizio Miccoli	Palermo	14
10	(Italy) Alessandro Del Piero	Juventus	13
10	(Italy) Filippo Inzaghi	Milan	13
10	(Romania) Adrian Mutu	Fiorentina	13
10	(Italy) Sergio Pellissier	Chievo	13
10	(Italy) Fabio Quagliarella	Udinese	13
10	(Italy) Francesco Totti	Roma	13
10	(Argentina) Mauro Zárate	Lazio	13

== Awards ==
=== AIC Awards ===
Award	Winner	Club
Best Italian Player	(Italy) Daniele De Rossi	Roma
Best Foreign Player	(Sweden) Zlatan Ibrahimović	Inter Milan
Best Overall Player	(Sweden) Zlatan Ibrahimović	Inter Milan
Best Young Player	(Brazil) Alexandre Pato	AC Milan
Best Goalkeeper	(Brazil) Júlio César	Inter Milan
Best Defender	(Italy) Giorgio Chiellini	Juventus
Best Coach	(Portugal) José Mourinho	Inter Milan
Best Referee	(Italy) Roberto Rosetti	
Best Goal	(Italy) Fabio Quagliarella	Napoli
Fan Award	(Argentina) Diego Milito	Genoa
Team of the Year	Inter Milan	

Team of the Year
Goalkeeper	(Brazil) Júlio César (Inter Milan)			
Defenders	(Brazil) Maicon (Inter Milan)	(Italy) Alessandro Gamberini (Fiorentina)	(Italy) Giorgio Chiellini (Juventus)	(Italy) Domenico Criscito (Genoa)
Midfielders	(Brazil) Felipe Melo (Fiorentina)	(Argentina) Esteban Cambiasso (Inter Milan)	(Brazil) Kaká (AC Milan)	(Italy) Gaetano D'Agostino (Udinese)
Forwards	(Italy) Marco Di Vaio (Bologna)		(Argentina) Diego Milito (Genoa)	

== Attendances ==
#	Club	Avg. attendance	Highest
1	AC Milan	59,731	79,057
2	Internazionale	55,345	76,437
3	SSC Napoli	39,851	60,240
4	AS Roma	39,396	61,198
5	SS Lazio	34,626	55,490
6	ACF Fiorentina	31,200	41,839
7	Genoa CFC	26,583	32,744
8	UC Sampdoria	23,323	34,395
9	US Città di Palermo	23,228	35,293
10	Juventus FC	21,218	24,862
11	Bologna FC	20,762	34,571
12	Calcio Catania	18,167	20,738
13	Torino FC	17,552	23,982
14	Udinese Calcio	16,880	27,497
15	ChievoVerona	13,352	28,924
16	Cagliari Calcio	12,442	20,000
17	Atalanta BC	12,231	21,814
18	US Lecce	12,171	29,658
19	Reggina Calcio	11,805	21,033
20	AC Siena	11,026	15,446
