= Antonio Colomban =

Italian footballer (1932–2020)

Personal information
- Date of birth: 5 February 1932
- Place of birth: Fasana d'Istria, Kingdom of Italy
- Date of death: 18 May 2020 (aged 88)
- Position: Midfielder

Youth career
- 1946–1951: Milan

Senior career*
Years	Team	Apps	(Gls)
1951–1957	Messina		
1957–1960	Cagliari	85	(4)
1960–1963	Taranto		

Managerial career
- 1957: Messina
- 1964–1967: Messina
- 1967–1969: Torres
- 1969–1971: Messina
- 1973–1974: Olbia
- 1975–1976: Gallipoli
- 1977–1978: Vittoria
- 1978–1979: Igea Virtus
- 1979–1981: Gela
- 1986: Catania
- 1991: Messina
- 1993: Messina
- * Club domestic league appearances and goals

Antonio Colomban (5 February 1932 – 18 May 2020) was an Italian football player and coach.

== Playing career ==
Born in Fasana d'Istria, Colomban, a midfielder, played youth football with Milan and professionally with Messina, Cagliari and Taranto.

== Coaching career ==
Colomban began his coaching career in 1957, managing Messina, Torres, Olbia, Gallipoli, Vittoria, Igea Virtus, Gela, and Catania, retiring in 1993.
