= Calcio Foggia 1920 =

Italian football club

Foggia
- Full name: Calcio Foggia 1920; S.r.l.
- Nicknames: Rossoneri (The Red and Blacks); Satanelli (The Little Satans); Dauni (The Daunians)
- Founded: 1920; 106 years ago as US Foggia; 2012 as Foggia Calcio; 2019; 7 years ago as Calcio Foggia 1920
- Stadium: Stadio Pino Zaccheria
- Capacity: 25,085
- Owner: Foggia Sport Srl
- President: Nicola Canonico
- Head coach: Gaetano Auteri
- League: Serie C Group C
- 2025–26: Serie C Group C, 18th of 20
- Website: www.calciofoggia1920.net
Home colours	Away colours	Third colours

Calcio Foggia 1920, commonly referred to as Foggia, is an Italian football club based in Foggia, Apulia. It currently plays in Serie C, the third division of the Italian championship.

Having last been in the top level Serie A in 1995, the team experienced the best periods in its history in the 1960s and 1970s, and also in the first half of the 1990s, playing four seasons in the top flight while coming close to qualifying for the UEFA Cup and gaining media exposure at European level for expressing fast and attacking football.

On 23 April 2017, the club regained promotion to Serie B after a 19-year absence, but folded again only two years later, to restart from Serie D in 2019 as Calcio Foggia.

== History ==
=== Foggia Calcio & U.S. Foggia ===
==== Foundation and early years ====
The club was founded in 1920 as Foggia Calcio. The club spent its early history playing football in the lower leagues, winning a championship in the dilettanti in 1933.

In 1957–58, a merger took place between Foggia Calcio and Foggia Incedit, forming Unione Sportiva Foggia as the club is today. In 1961–62, the team was taken over by President Domenico Rosa Rosa, a wood industrialist, and coach Oronzo Pugliese, who quickly led them to promotion to Serie B.

==== Reaching Serie A ====
History was made in the 1963–64 season, when Rosa Rosa and Oronzo Pugliese's Foggia reached Serie A for the first time. From 1964–65, Foggia managed to compete in three consecutive seasons in the top flight. On 31 January 1965, still under the guidance of coach Pugliese, Foggia recorded a historic 3–2 victory against Inter, who were at the time led by manager Helenio Herrera. The season was crowned by the national call-ups of Micelli and Nocera who played for Italy against Wales. Italy won 4–1 and Nocera managed to get on the scoresheet. At the end of the season, Pugliese left to take charge of Roma.

Pugliese was replaced by Egizio Rubino, and Foggia, although with more difficulty compared to the previous season, managed to survive the drop again. The following year, however, Foggia was relegated. It was a forgettable championship, after 10 matches Foggia had collected only three points and scored just 24 goals. Rubino was sacked and replaced by Bonazzini. The team improved under Bonazzini but failed to avoid relegation. At the end of the season, president Rosa Rosa also left the club, following their relegation.

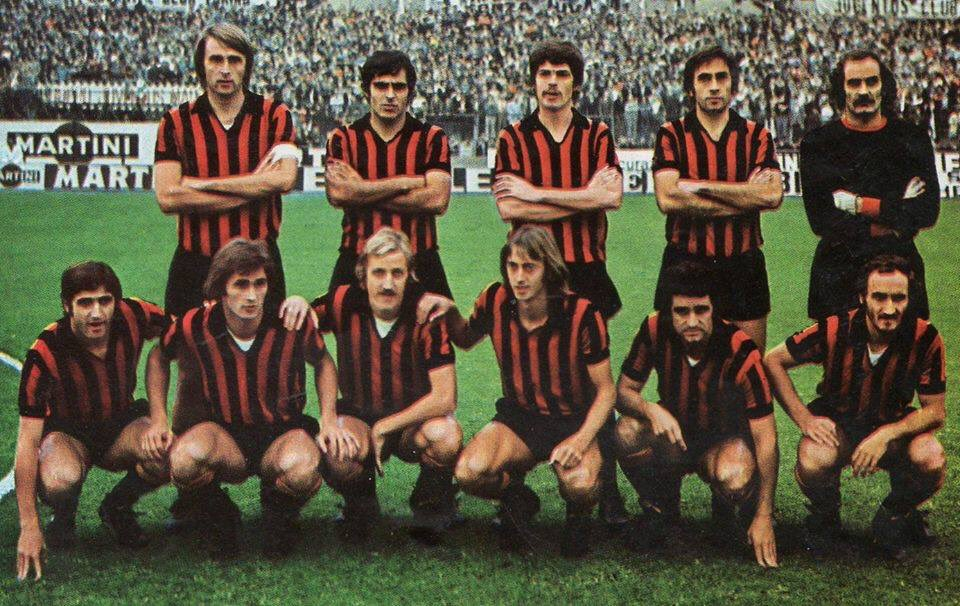
1973–74 Foggia

Relegated at the end of the 1966–67 season, Foggia returned to the top flight in 1970–71, with Tommaso Maestrelli on the bench. Maestrelli would later win the 1973–74 scudetto with Lazio. Luigi Del Neri was, at the time, a Foggia player. The club was relegated again and returned to Serie A in 1973–74, before another relegation which came after a 6-point deduction for alleged corruption relating to the referee of a home match against Milan. The coach that season was Lauro Toneatto. Foggia played two more seasons in Serie A in 1976–77 and in 1977–78, when they were once more relegated to Serie B.

==== Glory years and Zemanlandia ====
Following their relegation back to Serie B, Foggia were then dealt with a further blow with relegation to Serie C. They battled their way in Serie C1 throughout much of the 1980s. This was a particularly tough time for Foggia as their regional rivals, Bari, Lecce, Barletta and Taranto were all playing at higher levels.

In 1989, with the appointment of Czech Zdeněk Zeman for his second managerial stint at the club after a short spell in 1986-87, Foggia began to enter a successful period in its history. The aggressive and entertaining football of the Bohemian coach was based on a 4–3–3 formation. Pressure, offside tactics and frenetic movement of both players and the ball made up the trademark style of Zeman's Foggia. The club first returned to Serie B, and then the following season in 1990–91, they won the Serie B and returned to Serie A.

After returning to Serie A in the 1991–92 season, Foggia dei Miracoli, as they were known, proved to be competitive with any opponent and was appreciated by the press because of the attractive football they played. The term Zemanlandia was then coined to indicate the style created by Zeman, and became strictly associated to the Foggia team of the 1990s. The Foggia team also featured star players, especially attacking trio of Giuseppe Signori, Francesco Baiano and Roberto Rambaudi, as well as Russian star Igor Shalimov. That season, Foggia achieved the amazing feat of scoring 58 goals while also conceding 58. Foggia soon lost many of these quality players, including their three key forwards, and had to replace them with young talent. The club completed three Serie A campaigns finishing mid-table. In Serie A 1993-94, Foggia's football continued but the depleted squad was no longer as competitive and the club was relegated back to Serie B in 1995.

Zeman left to join Lazio at the end of that season, marking the end of Zemanlandia whilst the club was beset with financial problems. The Foggia glory days had come to an end.

==== Decline, Serie C and Zeman's return ====
Following the drop, Foggia spent two seasons in Serie B achieving mid-table finishes, before another relegation followed at the end of the 1997–98 season. They did not fare any better down in Serie C1, with another successive relegation to Serie C2.

Playing football in Italy's fourth tier was far less glamorous than the Zemanlandia days but the club set itself on the long road back in 2002–03, when led by coach Pasquale Marino and key players Roberto De Zerbi and Michele Pazienza, they were promoted back to Serie C1.

After the 2003–04 season, in which they finished mid-table but with good signs for the following year, Foggia were hit with financial problems and lost the coach Marino and all the best players.

=== Second U.S. Foggia ===
The news sent the fans into despair but Giuseppe Coccimiglio took over the reins of the club and gave confidence to the new club which assumed the team's historic name, Unione Sportiva Foggia, and was able to keep their place in the league, thanks to Comma 3 of the Article 52 of N.O.I.F.

After two more seasons finishing in mid-table, during which there were five coaching changes, Coccimiglio was criticised for not paying players' wages, a situation which created instability. After complex negotiations, the company passed into the hands of a team of local entrepreneurs led by Tullio Capobianco.

The club spent the following years mid-table in C1, narrowly losing a promotion playoff in 2006–07 against Avellino which would have seen them return to Serie B. The following season, 2007–08, they again reached the playoffs, this time losing to Cremonese.

In June 2010 Pasquale Casillo, chairman and owner during the glory years of the 1990s, re-acquired the club, and reformed the old trio of Foggia heads by appointing back Zdeněk Zeman as manager and Giuseppe Pavone as director of football. However, despite impressive performances from several young and promising players who went on to play at the highest level like Lorenzo Insigne and Marco Sau, Foggia missed out on playoff qualification.

=== Second Foggia Calcio ===
After the end of the 2011–12 season, Foggia was declined to enter Lega Pro Prima Divisione and was thus was excluded from professional football.

In the summer 2012 a new company named A.C.D. Foggia Calcio was founded to continue the football history of the city of Foggia. The club restarted from Serie D thanks to Article 52 of N.O.I.F. and was immediately promoted to Lega Pro Seconda Divisione through a repechage, dropping the A.C.D. part of their denomination in the process.

Over the next 5 seasons, the club will make the climb from Serie D (fifth level) to Serie B (second level); all this thanks to the coaches Pasquale Padalino, Roberto De Zerbi (who also won a Serie C Italian cup) and Giovanni Stroppa.

=== Third Foggia Calcio ===
After the end of the 2018–19 season, Foggia was declined to enter Serie C and was thus was excluded from professional football.

In the summer 2019 a new company named Calcio Foggia 1920 was founded to continue the football history of the city of Foggia. The club restarted from Serie D thanks to Article 52 of N.O.I.F. and was soon promoted to Serie C.

== Supporters ==
Football has always been a popular sport to follow in the city of Foggia, especially since the Zeman years. I Satanelli can also count on support from across the Province of Foggia.

The only twinning Foggia fans have is with the supporters of Cagliari and more specifically with the Sconvolts 1987 ultras. However, each group has personal friendships, notable are those with Monza, Latina and Budapest Honvéd.

93 year-old Foggia fan Nonno Ciccio has been attending matches consistently since 1937, with the exception of wartime years. Nonno is now cited as the oldest ultra in Italy and still regularly attends Foggia matches, home and away.

== Current squad ==
As of 1 September 2026

Note: Flags indicate national team as defined under FIFA eligibility rules; some limited exceptions apply. Players may hold more than one non-FIFA nationality.

No.	Pos.	Nation	Player
2	DF	ITA	Gianmarco Todisco
3	DF	SEN	Mohamed Seck (on loan from Roma)
4	MF	ITA	Andrea Gallo (on loan from Crotone)
6	DF	ITA	Davide Di Pasquale
7	FW	ITA	Enrico Oviszach (on loan from Ascoli)
8	MF	SEN	Mamadou Coulibaly
11	FW	ITA	Francesco Pio Petito (on loan from Dolomiti Bellunesi)
12	GK	ITA	Davide Marfella
16	MF	ITA	Hamza Haoudi
17	FW	ITA	Giuseppe Panico
18	FW	ITA	Pierluca Luciani (on loan from Ravenna)
19	MF	ITA	Rinaldo Maestrelli
20	DF	HUN	Milán Demeter
21	DF	ITA	Filippo Berra

No.	Pos.	Nation	Player
22	GK	ITA	Gianluca Saro
27	FW	ITA	Michele Bigonzoni
28	FW	FRA	Isyakha Touré
29	FW	FRA	Yanis Merdji
32	FW	ITA	Andrea Smeraldi
33	DF	LAT	Timurs Azarovs
37	MF	ITA	Valdes Ngana (on loan from Juventus)
51	DF	FRA	Corentin Parisy
56	MF	ITA	Edoardo Chiara
71	FW	ITA	Pietro Paolino
74	MF	ITA	Sebastian Miu
80	GK	ITA	Angelo Testa
—	DF	ITA	Leonardo Basso
—	MF	ITA	Gerardo Agnelli

=== Out on loan ===
Note: Flags indicate national team as defined under FIFA eligibility rules; some limited exceptions apply. Players may hold more than one non-FIFA nationality.

No.	Pos.	Nation	Player
—	MF	ITA	Claudio Conte (at Heraclea until 30 June 2027)

== Club officials ==
=== Board of directors ===
Role	Name
President	(Italy) Roberto Felleca
Executive President	(Italy) Davide Pelusi
Financial Director	(Italy) Enrico Maria Garau
Operational Director	(Italy) Edoardo Chighine
Marketing Director	(Italy) Alessandro Quoiani
General Secretary	(Italy) Gianni Francavilla
Sporting director	(Italy) Ninni Corda
Team Manager	(Italy) Diego Valente
Youth Team Coordinator	(Italy) Giuseppe Di Biase
Press Officer	(Italy) Mario Ciampi
Photographer	(Italy) Federico Antonellis

=== Current technical staff ===
Role	Name
Head coach	(Italy) Delio Rossi
Assistant coach	(Italy) Roberto Cau
Goalkeeping coach	(Italy) Fabrizio Carafa
Fitness coach	(Italy) Fabio Rollo
Chief Doctor	(Italy) Antonio Macchiarola
Club doctor	(Italy) Lucio Cinquesanti
Physiotherapist	(Italy) Michele Rabbaglietti
Kit men	(Italy) Luigi Boscaino (Italy) Francesco Di Stefano

== Managerial history ==
Foggia have had many managers and trainers throughout the history of the club, in some seasons more than one manager was in charge. Here is a chronological list of them from 1923 onwards.

- (Italy) Roberto Fini– 1923–28
- (Italy) Severino Rosso– 1928–29
- (Hungary) Béla Károly– 1929–32
- (Austria) Tony Cargnelli– 1932–33
- (Austria) Engelbert König– 1933–34
- (Italy) Silvio Stritzel– 1934–35
- (Italy) Giovanni Batista Rebuffo– 1935
- (Hungary) Wilmos Wilhelm– 1935–36
- (Hungary) Béla Károly– 1936–37
- (Italy) Angelo Benincasa– 1937–39
- (Hungary) István Fogl – 1939–40
- (Hungary) Ferenc Plemich– 1940
- (Hungary) István Fogl – 1940–41
- (Hungary) Ferenc Plemich– 1941
- (Italy) Angelo Benincasa– 1941–46
- (Italy) Piero Andreoli– 1946–47
- (Hungary) Lajos Politzer– 1947–48
- (Italy) Angelo Benincasa– 1948–49
- (Hungary) András Kuttik– 1949
- (Italy) Vincenzo Marsico– 1949–50
- (Hungary) András Kuttik– 1950
- (Italy) Vincenzo Marsico– 1950–51
- (Austria) Tony Cargnelli– 1951–52
- (Italy) Cesare Migliorini – 1952
- (Italy) Vincenzo Marsico– 1952–53
- (Italy) Cesare Migliorini – 1953–54
- (Hungary) Lajos Kovács– 1954–55
- (Italy) Leandro Remondini– 1955
- (Italy) Vincenzo Marsico– 1955–59
- (Italy) Leonardo Costagliola – 1959–60
- (Italy) Paolo Tabanelli– 1960–61
- (Italy) Leonardo Costagliola – 1961
- (Italy) Oronzo Pugliese– 1961–65
- (Italy) Egizio Rubino – 1965–66
- (Italy) Luigi Bonizzoni– 1966–68
- (Italy) Serafino Montanari – 1968
- (Italy) Tommaso Maestrelli– 1968–71
- (Italy) Ettore Puricelli– 1971–72
- (Italy) Lauro Toneatto– 1972–74
- (Italy) Cesare Maldini– 1974–76
- (Italy) Roberto Balestri – 1976
- (Italy) Ettore Puricelli– 1976–78
- (Brazil) Cinesinho– 1978–79
- (Italy) Giorgio Sereni– 1979–80
- (Italy) Ettore Puricelli– 1980–81
- (Italy) Vasco Tagliavini– 1981–82
- (Italy) Fernando Veneranda– 1982
- (Italy) Lamberto Leonardi– 1982–83
- (Italy) Lamberto Giorgis– 1983
- (Italy) Romano Fogli – 1983–84
- (Italy) Ettore Puricelli– 1984
- (Italy) Lamberto Giorgis– 1984–85
- (Italy) Graziano Landoni – 1985
- (Italy) G.B. Fabbri– 1985
- (Italy) Corrado Viciani – 1985–86
- (Italy) G.B. Fabbri– 1986
- (Czechoslovakia) Zdeněk Zeman– 1986–87
- (Italy) Roberto Balestri– 1987
- (Italy) Pippo Marchioro– 1987–88
- (Italy) Roberto Balestri– 1988
- (Italy) Giuseppe Caramanno– 1988–89
- (Czech Republic) Zdeněk Zeman– 1989–94
- (Italy) Enrico Catuzzi – 1994–95
- (Italy) Delio Rossi– 1995–96
- (Italy) Tarcisio Burgnich– 1996–97
- (Italy) Domenico Caso– 1997
- (Italy) Beniamino Cancian– 1997–98
- (Italy) Domenico Caso– 1998
- (Italy) Lorenzo Mancano– 1998–99
- (Italy) Fabio Brini– 1999
- (Italy) Piero Braglia– 1999–00
- (Italy) Lorenzo Mancano– 2000
- (Italy) Ignazio Arcoleo– 2000–01
- (Italy) Bruno Pace– 2001–02
- (Italy) Carlo Florimbi– 2002
- (Italy) Pasquale Marino– 2002–04
- (Italy) Giuseppe Giannini– 2004–05
- (Italy) Massimo Morgia– 2005–06
- (Italy) Giorgio Rumignani– 2006
- (Italy) Silvano Fiorucci– 2006
- (Italy) Stefano Cuoghi– 2006–07
- (Italy) Fulvio D'Adderio– 2007
- (Italy) Salvatore Campilongo– 2007–08
- (Italy) Giuseppe Galderisi– 2008
- (Italy) Raffaele Novelli– 2008–09
- (Italy) Antonio Porta– 2009
- (Italy) Guido Ugolotti– 2010
- (Czech Republic) Zdeněk Zeman– 2010–11
- (Italy) Valter Bonacina– 2011
- (Italy) Paolo Stringara– 2011–12
- (Italy) Valter Bonacina– 2012
- (Italy) Pasquale Padalino– 2012–13
- (Italy) Roberto De Zerbi– 2014–16
- (Italy) Giovanni Stroppa– 2016–18
- (Italy) Gianluca Grassadonia– 2018
- (Italy) Pasquale Padalino– 2018–19
- (Italy) Gianluca Grassadonia– 2019
- (Brazil) Amantino Mancini– 2019
- (Italy) Ninni Corda– 2019-2020
- (Italy) Ezio Capuano– 2020
- (Italy) Vincenzo Maiuri– 2020
- (Italy) Marco Marchionni– 2020–2021
- (Czech Republic) Zdeněk Zeman– 2021–Present

== Honours ==
- Serie B

Winners: 1990–91

- Serie C

Winners: 1932–33, 1959–60, 1961–62, 2016–17

- Serie C2

Winners: 2002–2003

- Serie D

Winners: 2019–2020

- Coppa Italia Serie C

Winners: 2006–07, 2015–16

- Supercoppa di Serie C

Winners: 2017

== Divisional movements ==
Series	Years	Last	Promotions	Relegations
A	11	1994–95	-	▼5 (1967, 1971, 1974, 1978, 1995)
B	25	2018–19	▲5 (1964, 1970, 1973, 1976, 1991)	▼7 (1936, 1947, 1961, 1979, 1983, 1998, 2019✟)
C +C2	46 +5	2026–27	▲7 (1933, 1946, 1960, 1962, 1980, 1989, 2017) ▲2 (2003 C2, 2014 C2)	▼1 (1999 C1) ▼2 (1952, 2012✟)
87 out of 95 years of professional football in Italy since 1929
D	8	2019–20	▲3 (1958, 2013, 2020)	never
