= Nevio Orlandi =

Italian football manager (born 1954)

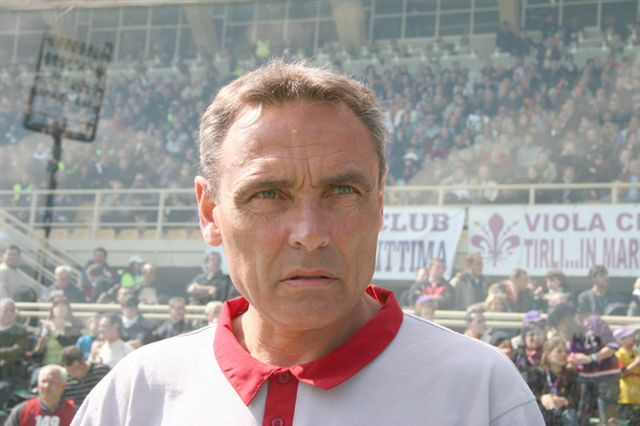

Personal information
- Date of birth: 30 January 1954 (age 72)
- Place of birth: Casalmaggiore, Italy
- Position: Right back

Senior career*
Years	Team	Apps	(Gls)
197?–198?	Akragas		
1982–1983	Licata		

Managerial career
- Potenza
- Maglie
- 2003–2004: Vittoria
- 2008: Reggina
- 2009: Reggina
- 2013–2014: Barletta
- 2016: Grosseto
- 2016–2017: Chieti
- 2017–2019: Vibonese
- 2022: Vibonese
- * Club domestic league appearances and goals

Nevio Orlandi (born 30 January 1954) is an Italian football manager.

== Career ==
=== Playing ===
Orlandi spent his career playing for several amateur teams, including Akragas throughout the 1970s and the 1980s, and being nicknamed l'agricoltore (the peasant) because of his particular running style.

=== Coaching ===
After a short experience working as youth team coach for Vicenza, Orlandi joined Reggina in 1989, becoming their Allievi Nazionali (16-year-old youngsters) head coach, being then promoted at the helm of the Primavera (main youth team roster) soon later, and successively serving as assistant manager to Franco Colomba during the amaranto's 2000–2001 campaign. Later on he had a few other experiences at the helm of amateur teams Potenza, Maglie, and Vittoria, where he won the Serie C2 playoffs in 2004 and headed the Sicilian team during the first five weeks of the following season, in Serie C1. He then returned at Reggina, where he served as youth team coach, and then as club scout for Latin America.

On March 3, 2008, he was appointed to replace Renzo Ulivieri at the helm of Reggina's first team. During his stint as first team coach, results dramatically improved and Reggina managed to mathematically save themselves from relegation in advance of one week.

He was confirmed at the helm of Reggina for the 2008–09 season. In his second season as Reggina coach, the team struggled to achieve positive results, and this ultimately led to Orlandi being dismissed from his post on December 16, two days after a home 0–2 loss to Sampdoria, leaving the team in second-last place with 12 points achieved in 16 games. He was replaced by Giuseppe Pillon.

On January 25, 2009, he was reinstated back at the helm of the amaranto following the club's decision to dismiss Pillon due to poor results, but did not manage to save his club from relegation and left the club later in June.

He returned into management in 2013 as head coach of Barletta from March 2013 to April 2014. He then served as Grosseto head coach in the Serie D league from February to June 2016, before taking over at Chieti that same year in July. However, in January 2017 he found himself without a team after Chieti was excluded from the Serie D league due to financial issues.

On 17 November 2017, he was named head coach of Serie D club Vibonese, guiding the club to promotion in the 2017–18 Serie D season, and a mid-table placement in the subsequent 2018–19 Serie C campaign.

On 14 February 2022, Orlandi agreed to return to relegation-battling Vibonese until the end of the season.
