= Giuliano Zoratti =

Italian footballer and manager (1947–2021)

Personal information
- Date of birth: 13 July 1947
- Place of birth: Udine, Italy
- Date of death: 2 July 2021 (aged 73)
- Place of death: Udine
- Position: Midfielder

Senior career*
Years	Team	Apps	(Gls)
?–1975	Pro Gorizia		

Managerial career
- 1974–1975: Pro Gorizia
- 1986–1990: Pro Vercelli
- 1990–1991: Massese
- 1991–1992: Triestina
- 1992–1994: Livorno
- 1994–1996: Reggina
- 1996–1997: Avellino
- 1997: Alessandria
- 1998–1999: Juve Stabia
- 1999–2000: Novara
- 2000–2001: Cormonese
- 2001–2003: Itala San Marco
- 2003–2004: Pro Gorizia
- 2004–2006: Jesolo
- 2006–2010: Itala San Marco
- 2010–2012: I.S.M. Gradisca
- * Club domestic league appearances and goals

Giuliano Zoratti (13 July 1947 – 2 July 2021) was an Italian professional football player and manager.

== Career ==
=== As player ===
As a footballer, he played several seasons in Friuli-Venezia Giulia regional tournaments. In 1974, he started coaching career, with Pro Gorizia.

=== As coach ===
In the following decade, he assisted Massimo Giacomini on several benches of Serie A and B like Udinese, Milan, Torino, Napoli, Triestina and Perugia.

In 1986, he signed for Pro Vercelli as first coach. In the following years he managed several clubs, leading Reggina in Serie B in 1995.

From 2006, he has coached Itala San Marco, a small club from Gradisca d'Isonzo which led for its first time in Serie C2 in 2008, until the end of the 2009–10 season when the club has failed.

Since the season immediately following, he trained I.S.M. Gradisca, the new club of the city, that is promoted from the Eccellenza Friuli-Venezia Giulia to Serie D.
