= US Triestina Calcio 1918 =

Italian football club

Triestina
- Full name: Unione Sportiva Triestina Calcio 1918 S.r.l.
- Nicknames: L'Unione (The Union); Gli Alabardati (The Halberded); I Rossoalabardati (The Halberded Reds); I Giuliani (The Julians)
- Founded: 18 December 1918; 107 years ago (Unione Sportiva Triestina); 30 June 1994; 32 years ago (Nuova Unione Sportiva Calcio Triestina); 31 July 2012; 14 years ago (Union Triestina 2012); 23 May 2016; 10 years ago (Unione Sportiva Triestina Calcio 1918)
- Ground: Stadio Nereo Rocco, Trieste, Friuli-Venezia Giulia, Italy
- Capacity: 24,500
- Chairman: Giuseppe D'Aniello
- Manager: Gaetano Fontana
- League: Serie D Group C
- 2025–26: Serie C Group A, 20th of 20 (relegated)
- Website: www.triestina1918.it
Home colours	Away colours	Third colours

Unione Sportiva Triestina Calcio 1918, commonly referred to US Triestina or just Triestina, is an Italian football club based in Trieste, in the northern Friuli-Venezia Giulia region.

Triestina was one of the founding members of Serie A in 1929 and featured in Italian top flight until the late 1950s. Triestina spent the following decades in lower levels, and during that time the club was folded and re-established several times. As of the 2026–27 season it plays in Serie D, the fourth tier of Italian football.

== History ==
=== From the foundation to Serie A ===
Between 1900 and 1915, several football clubs were active in Trieste. Some, such as Edera, founded in 1904, originated from gymnastics societies, while others, including Circolo Sportivo Ponziana Trieste (1912) and Foot-Ball Club Trieste, were more directly associated with football. Following the end of the First World War, Ponziana and Trieste merged on 18 December 1918 to form Unione Sportiva Triestina. The meeting took place at the historic Caffè Battisti on Viale XX Settembre. According to Dante di Ragogna in La storia della Triestina, the merger was encouraged by the military authorities after both clubs had been using the parade ground of the Caserma G. Oberdan as their playing field. The movement of players and supporters caused overcrowding around the barracks, leading the military command to request the creation of a single club. Captain Guglielmo Tonon negotiated a compromise allowing football activity to continue only if the two teams merged into one organisation.

Representatives present at the founding meeting included Tranquillini, Stritzel and Zigoi for Trieste, and Godina, Zack and Flaider for Ponziana. The merger was ratified on 19 January 1919, when a triumvirate composed of Bertazzoni, Fonda and Vaccari was appointed to oversee the club's early activities. A final assembly on 2 February 1919 officially confirmed the creation of Unione Sportiva Triestina, which adopted the halberd of Trieste topped by a star as its emblem. The club's first president was Doimo Iviani Ivanissevich, of Dalmatian origin, who remained in office until 1923.

Triestina initially played on a field located inside the courtyard of the Caserma G. Oberdan military barracks before moving in 1919 to a new ground in Muggia, near Trieste. In the same year, the club won the Coppa Virgola and also reached the final of the Coppa Appiani, where it lost to Padova. Between 1919 and 1920, Triestina competed in the Venezia Giulia regional championship.

Between 1919 and 1920, the club competed in the Venezia Giulia regional championship. In 1921, Triestina entered its first national competition in the Third Division (now corresponding to Serie C). The club remained in this category for two further seasons before achieving promotion to the Second Division (Serie B) in the 1923–24 season, following a qualifying tournament among northern Italian teams. Triestina won the competition by defeating Verona 3–2 in the semi-final and Pro Gorizia 1–0 in the final, with the decisive goal scored from a penalty by Sommer. During this period, Ettore Tardivello became club president.

In 1921, the club entered its first national championship in the Italian Third Division. After two further seasons in the competition, Triestina achieved promotion to the Second Division in the 1923–24 season through a qualifying tournament among northern Italian clubs, defeating Verona 3–2 in the semi-final and Pro Gorizia 1–0 in the final, with the decisive goal scored from a penalty by Sommer. During this period, Ettore Tardivello served as club president.

The club retained its place in the Second Division in the 1924–25 season. In the following season, the competition was reorganised, with the Second Division split and later restructured into a single-group league of 24 teams under the name Prima Divisione, in which Triestina finished fourth. In 1926–27, the club improved further, finishing third, before placing fourth again in 1927–28, a season which also saw the emergence of forward Piero Pasinati.

The 1928–29 season, which preceded the introduction of the single-group Serie A with 16 teams, saw Triestina, coached by Rodolfo Soutschek, compete in Group A of the Prima Divisione, finishing ninth. Initially, this result was not sufficient to qualify for the inaugural Serie A season. However, due to uncertainty in determining the final qualification place between Napoli and Lazio in Group B, the Italian Football Federation expanded the league to 18 teams, allowing Triestina to be admitted to the inaugural Serie A season in 1929–30.

In the 1929–30 season, Triestina made its debut in Serie A and established itself in the top flight, remaining in the division for many consecutive seasons until 1957. One of the club’s most significant players during this period was Nereo Rocco, a native of Trieste, who played as a winger for Triestina between 1930 and 1937. He also became the first player from the club to represent the Italy national team, earning his debut in 1934.

Rocco later returned to Triestina as head coach in 1947, leading the club to its greatest league achievement in the 1947–48 Serie A season, when Triestina finished second behind Torino. This remains the highest league finish in the club’s history.

Rocco then left in 1950 to be replaced by Hungarian coach Béla Guttman, who managed to save the club from relegation only in the final matchday. Another struggling season followed in 1951–52, with Triestina escaping relegation only after winning playoffs against Lucchese and Brescia. During the 1952–53 season, Cesare Maldini made his Serie A debut in a Triestina jersey. In 1953 Rocco returned to Triestina, but was sacked after 21 matchdays due to poor results. Three more mid-table seasons followed before Triestina suffered its first relegation in 1957. Successively, Triestina returned to Serie A in 1958, but were relegated in their first comeback season, which is also their last top flight campaign to date.

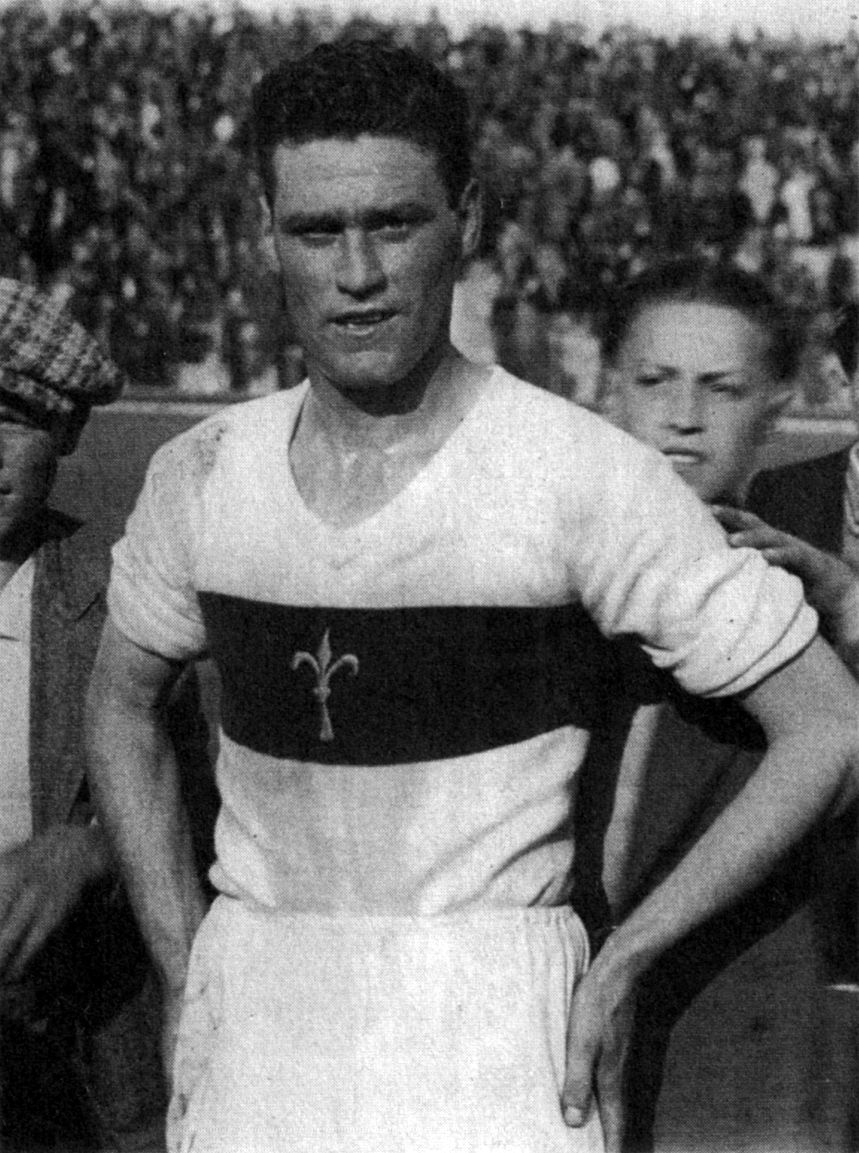
Nereo Rocco, legend of Trieste's football, played for Triestina in the 1930s and trained the squad in the post–World War II era.

The club were successively relegated to Serie C in 1961 once, in 1965 twice, and even Serie D in 1971, forcing the alabardati to a local derby with "Ponziana" in 1975. The club returned to Serie C in 1976, and was admitted to Serie C1 in 1978, and finally returned to Serie B in 1983, missing promotion to the top flight for a few seasons before being relegated in 1988. Triestina also played in second level between 1962–1965 and 1989–1991.

=== The first refoundation in 1994 ===
In 1994, the team was forced to fold, because of financial insolvency, and was re-founded by Giorgio Del Sabato. The team restarted as U.S. Triestina Calcio from Serie D and was readmitted to Serie C2 by the federation one year later. In 2001, after six seasons in Serie C2, the club won promotion to Serie C1 after playoffs; this was followed by a second consecutive promotion, this time to Serie B, both under head coach Ezio Rossi.

In the 2005–06 season, Triestina changed its manager five times. The list include the tandem Alessandro Calori-Adriano Buffoni, Pietro Vierchowod, caretaker Francesco De Falco, youth team coach Vittorio Russo and Andrea Agostinelli.

In addition, Triestina's owner Flaviano Tonellotto was forced to resign on 1 February 2006 by the magistrates because of a pending court procedure for bankruptcy, and his wife Jeannine Koevoets was named to replace him at the helm of the club. However, Tonellotto was successively ordered to leave the association because of financial troubles. The magistrates named Francesco De Falco as caretaker chairman with the idea of finding somebody interested to buy the club. Curiously, in the 2005–06 De Falco, a player for Triestina in the 1980s, covered three different roles in the club: director of football, manager and chairman. In April 2006 the team was purchased by the Fantinel family, owners of a wine company in the region.

In recent years, Triestina struggled to mount a promotion campaign to end half-century absence from the Italian top flight. Triestina finished 8th in 2008–2009 season. However failed to remain in Serie B in the 2009–10 season, with a crashing 3–0 defeat to Padova at the play-outs, and was relegated to Lega Pro Prima Divisione after 8 years of endeavour in the second tier of Italian football, only to be readmitted to Serie B after Ancona filed for bankruptcy.

On 21 May 2011, in the season 2010–11, after a disastrous campaign, Triestina was relegated from Serie B to Lega Pro Prima Divisione, having returned there in 2002 after 11 seasons in Serie C and Serie D.

==== 2012: Relegation and bankruptcy ====
On 25 January 2012 the club in strong financial difficulty, has been declared bankrupt by the court of Trieste.

In the season 2011–12 Triestina was relegated from Lega Pro Prima Divisione group B to Lega Pro Seconda Divisione.

On 19 June 2012 the club was finally declared bankrupt and the team was disbanded.

Stefano Mario Fantinel, former chairman of the club, was suspended from football activities for 5 years after the prosecutor found accounting irregularities of the club. In July, three more months were added due to player transfer irregularities. Fantinel was also suspended for 3 months in 2006–07 Serie B, also causing the club 1 point, for irregularities on preparing quarterly management report on 30 March 2006.

=== Unione Triestina 2012 / U.S. Triestina Calcio 1918 ===
On 31 July 2012 a new company Unione Triestina 2012 S.S.D. a. r.l. was founded, that restarted from Eccellenza thanks to Article 52 of N.O.I.F. The sports title was later transferred to another "limited company in amateur sport" (Italian: Società Sportiva Dilettantistica a responsabilità limitata) U.S. Triestina Calcio 1918 s.s.d. a. r.l. in 2016. After the promotion to Serie C on 4 August 2017, the company dropped the legal suffix "amateur sport" from the name.

== Colors and badge ==
The club's badge features a white spontoon or halberd—from where the club gets the nickname Gli Alabardati (The Halberded)—on a red background. This is inspired by the coat of arms and flag of the city of Trieste. Other features of the badge include a shining white star and the words U. S. Triestina. After this badge, the team's colours both home and away are red and white.

== Honours ==
- Serie B
  - Winners: 1957–58
- Coppa Italia Serie C
  - Winners: 1993–94
- Serie C1
  - Winners: 1961–62 North, 1982–83 North

== Divisional movements ==
Series	Years	Last	Promotions	Relegations
A	26	1958–59	-	▼2 (1957, 1959)
B	22	2010–11	▲1 (1958)	▼5 (1961, 1965, 1988, 1991, 2011)
C +C2	31 +6	2025–26	▲4 (1962, 1983, 1989, 2002) ▲1 (2001 C2)	▼5 (1971, 1974, 1994✟, 2012✟, 2026)
85 out of 95 years of professional football in Italy since 1929
D	9	2026–27	▲4 (1972, 1976, 1995, 2017)	never
E	1	2012–13	▲1 (2013)	never

== Current squad ==
As of 17 September 2026

Note: Flags indicate national team as defined under FIFA eligibility rules; some limited exceptions apply. Players may hold more than one non-FIFA nationality.

No.	Pos.	Nation	Player
1	GK	ITA	Giordano Turrini
2	DF	ITA	Manuel Demarco
3	DF	ITA	Christian Lupi
4	DF	ITA	Andrea Munaretto
6	MF	ITA	Riccardo Bongelli (on loan from Sambenedettese)
8	MF	ITA	Andrea Ferretti
9	FW	ITA	Lorenzo Sorrentino
10	MF	ITA	Lorenzo Di Livio
11	MF	ITA	Paolo Beltrame
20	FW	ITA	Francesco Cacciopoli
21	DF	ITA	Edoardo Giusti
22	GK	ITA	Nicola Torregiani (on loan from Teramo)
23	DF	LUX	Rodrigo Delgado De Albuquerque (on loan from Genoa)

No.	Pos.	Nation	Player
25	FW	SRB	Arsenije Vranić
27	DF	ITA	Edoardo Vona
28	MF	ITA	Giuseppe Borello (on loan from Giugliano)
29	FW	ITA	Samuele Vianni
30	MF	SEN	Ibrahima Ba
66	MF	ITA	Gerardo Di Gilio
90	DF	ITA	Gianmarco Bassini
—	MF	ITA	Manuel Moschella
—	MF	ITA	Ionel Catalin Sima
—	DF	ITA	Samuele Bonaccorsi
—	FW	ITA	Alessandro Corti
—	FW	ITA	Lorenzo Chiarella

== Former managers ==
Unione Sportiva Triestina

- Rudolf Soutchek (1929–30)
- István Tóth (1930–31)
- Béla Révész (1931–32)
- Károly Csapkay (1932–34)
- István Tóth (1934–36)
- Lajos Kovács (1936–37)
- Mario Grassi (1932)
- Luis Monti (1939–40)
- Rudolf Soutchek (1940–41)
- Mario Villini (1941–42)
- Guido Testolina (1943–44)
- Mario Villini (1945–46)
- Mario Varglien (1946–47)
- Nereo Rocco (1947–50)
- Béla Guttmann (1950–52)
- Mario Perazzolo (1952–53)
- Nereo Rocco (1953)
- Severino Feruglio (1953–56)
- Piero Pasinati (1956–57)
- Aldo Olivieri (1957–59)
- Guglielmo Trevisan (1959–61)
- Vasco Tagliavini (1974–79)
- Fulvio Varglien (1979–80)
- Ottavio Bianchi (1980–81)
- Adriano Buffoni (1981–84)
- Massimo Giacomini (1984–85)
- Enzo Ferrari (1985–88)
- Marino Lombardo (1988–90)
- Massimo Giacomini (1990–91)
- Franco Veneranda (1991)
- Giuliano Zoratti (1991–92)
- Attilio Perotti (1992–93)
- Vittorio Russo (1993)
- Adriano Buffoni (1993–94)

Nuova Unione Sportiva Calcio Triestina

- Franco Pezzato (1994–95)
- Giorgio Roselli (1995–97)
- Adriano Lombardi (1997)
- Giuseppe Marchioro (1997–98)
- Paolo Beruatto & Giuseppe Dossena (1998)
- Paolo Ferrario (1998–99)
- Andrea Mandorlini (1999)
- Maurizio Costantini (1999–2000)
- Ezio Rossi (2000–03)
- Attilio Tesser (2003–05)
- Adriano Buffoni & Alessandro Calori (2005)
- Pietro Vierchowod (2005)
- Francesco De Falco (2005)
- Vittorio Russo (2005–06)
- Andrea Agostinelli (2006–07)
- Franco Varrella (2007)
- Rolando Maran (2007–09)
- Luca Gotti (2009)
- Mario Somma (2009–10)
- Daniele Arrigoni (2010)
- Ivo Iaconi (2010)
- Sandro Salvioni (2010–11)
- Massimo Pavanel (2011)
- Gian Cesare Discepoli (2011)
- Giuseppe Galderisi (2011–12)

Unione Triestina 2012

- Fabio Sambaldi (2012)
- Maurizio Costantini (2012–13)
- Fabio Rossitto (2013–14)
- Stefano Lotti (2014)
- Giuseppe Ferazzoli (2014–15)
- Gianluca Gagliardi (2015)
- Cristiano Masitto (2015)
- Stefano Lotti (2015)
- Elio Roncelli (2015)
- Paolo Doardo (2015–16)
- Roberto Bordin (2016)

Società Sportiva Dilettantistica Unione Sportiva Triestina Calcio 1918

- Antonio Andreucci (2016–17)
- Giuseppe Sannino (2017–18)
- Nicola Princivalli (2018)
- Massimo Pavanel (2018–2019)
- Nicola Princivalli (2019)
- Carmine Gautieri (2019–2020)
- Giuseppe Pillon (2020–2021)
- Cristian Bucchi (2021–2022)
- Andrea Bonatti (2022)
- Massimo Pavanel (2022–2023)
- Augusto Gentilini (2023–2023)
- Attilio Tesser (2023–2024)
- Roberto Bordin (2024)
- Michele Santoni (2024)
- Pep Clotet (2024)
- Attilio Tesser (2024–25)
- Giuseppe Marino (2025)
- Attilio Tesser (2025–26)
- Giuseppe Marino (2026)
- Gaetano Fontana (2026–)
