= Adriano Lombardi =

Italian footballer and manager (1945–2007)

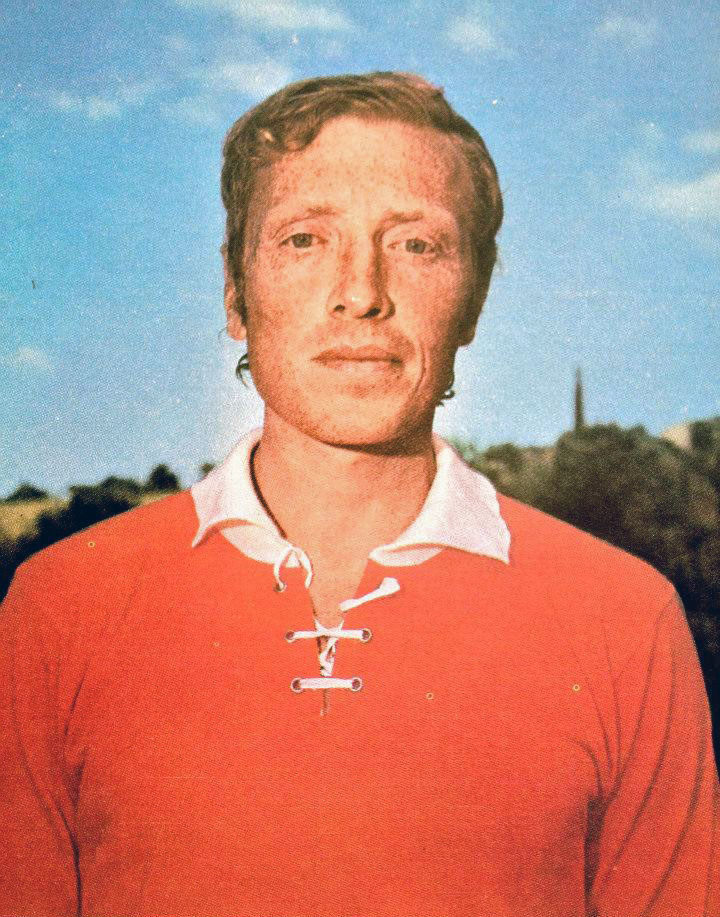
- Lombardi with Perugia in the 1973–74 season

Personal information
- Date of birth: 7 August 1945
- Place of birth: Ponsacco, Italy
- Date of death: 30 November 2007 (aged 62)
- Place of death: Mercogliano, Italy
- Position: Midfielder

Managerial career
- Years: Team
- 1983–1985: Chiasso
- 1985–1986: Derthona
- 1986–1987: Pontedera
- 1987–1988: Siena
- 1989–1990: Avellino
- 1990–1992: Casertana
- 1992–1993: Avellino
- 1993–1994: Giarre
- 1993–1994: Empoli
- 1994–1995: Rimini
- 1995–1996: Benevento
- 1997: Triestina
- 1997–1998: Avellino
- 1998–1999: Casertana
- 1999–2001: Turris

Adriano Lombardi (7 August 1945 – 30 November 2007), nicknamed Italian: il rosso di Ponsacco, was an Italian football player and coach, mostly known for his time spent at Avellino.

== Career ==
Lombardi played as a midfielder with many teams, in particular Perugia, Como and Avellino.

In November 2007, at the age of 62, he died of amyotrophic lateral sclerosis, in Mercogliano.

In his honour, the number 10 Avellino jersey, worn by Lombardi during his time for the "lupi", has been retired.

On 9 June 2011, Avellino's Stadio Partenio was dedicated to Lombardi.

== See also ==
- amyotrophic lateral sclerosis
- Retired numbers in association football
