= 1961–62 Serie C =

Serie C
- Season: 1961-62
- Champions: Girone A - Triestina, Girone B - Cagliari, Girone C - Foggia
- Promoted: Girone A - Triestina, Girone B - Cagliari, Girone C - Foggia
- Relegated: Girone A - Pro Vercelli, Bolzano, Girone B - Spezia, Empoli, Girone C - San Vito Benevento, Barletta

The 1961–62 Serie C was the twenty-fourth edition of Serie C, the third highest league in the Italian football league system.

== Girone A ==
Pos	Team	Pld	W	D	L	GF	GA	GD	Pts	Promotion or relegation
1	Triestina	34	17	13	4	46	24	+22	47	Promoted to Serie B
2	Biellese	34	17	12	5	47	28	+19	46	
3	Mestrina	34	16	11	7	52	34	+18	43	
4	Fanfulla	34	14	15	5	40	27	+13	43	
5	Varese	34	13	13	8	43	29	+14	39	
6	Savona	34	12	15	7	37	26	+11	39	
7	Marzotto	34	9	17	8	30	33	−3	35	
8	Vittorio Veneto	34	12	9	13	38	38	0	33	
9	Sanremese	34	9	15	10	27	37	−10	33	
10	Cremonese	34	13	5	16	43	42	+1	31	
11	Pordenone	34	10	11	13	36	37	−1	31	
12	Casale	34	10	11	13	34	38	−4	31	
13	Treviso	34	9	13	12	21	31	−10	31	
14	Ivrea	34	8	14	12	24	33	−9	30	
15	Legnano	34	11	7	16	37	35	+2	29	
16	Saronno	34	9	10	15	24	37	−13	28	
17	Pro Vercelli	34	9	10	15	35	46	−11	28 (Note: Relegated after tie-breaker: Pro Vercelli-Saronno 0-1)	Relegated to Serie D
18	Bolzano	34	2	11	21	17	56	−39	15	Relegated to Serie D

== Girone B ==
Pos	Team	Pld	W	D	L	GF	GA	GD	Pts	Promotion or relegation
1	Cagliari	34	17	10	7	51	23	+28	44	Promoted to Serie B
2	Anconitana	34	19	3	12	55	39	+16	41	
3	Pisa	34	16	9	9	52	37	+15	41	
4	Arezzo	34	15	9	10	52	45	+7	39	
5	Sarom Ravenna	34	16	6	12	53	39	+14	38	
6	Cesena	34	12	13	9	32	29	+3	37	
7	Pistoiese	34	12	10	12	42	37	+5	34	
8	Torres	34	11	12	11	41	37	+4	34	
9	Rimini	34	9	15	10	34	32	+2	33	
10	Siena	34	10	13	11	35	37	−2	33	
11	Forlì	34	12	9	13	29	43	−14	33	
12	Perugia	34	12	8	14	39	42	−3	32	
13	Livorno	34	10	11	13	34	39	−5	31	
14	Del Duca Ascoli	34	12	6	16	39	51	−12	30	
15	Portocivitanovese	34	11	8	15	30	42	−12	30	
16	Grosseto	34	7	14	13	30	39	−9	28	
17	Spezia	34	9	9	16	31	49	−18	27	Relegated to Serie D
18	Empoli	34	10	7	17	32	51	−19	27	Relegated to Serie D

== Girone C ==
Pos	Team	Pld	W	D	L	GF	GA	GD	Pts	Promotion or relegation
1	Foggia	34	20	5	9	42	22	+20	45	Promoted to Serie B
2	Lecce	34	15	12	7	39	24	+15	42	
3	Salernitana	34	15	10	9	44	33	+11	40	
4	Potenza	34	14	12	8	40	30	+10	40	
5	Taranto	34	14	12	8	33	25	+8	40	
6	Trapani	34	14	9	11	34	28	+6	37	
7	Marsala	34	10	15	9	28	25	+3	35	
8	Reggina	34	12	10	12	41	34	+7	34	
9	Akragas	34	14	5	15	36	39	−3	33	
10	Pescara	34	11	10	13	29	30	−1	32	
11	Siracusa	34	11	10	13	39	43	−4	32	
12	Tevere Roma	34	12	7	15	37	42	−5	31	
13	Bisceglie	34	11	9	14	36	41	−5	31	
14	Crotone	34	9	12	13	24	32	−8	30	
15	L'Aquila	34	8	14	12	18	29	−11	30	
16	Chieti	34	10	9	15	34	45	−11	29	
17	San Vito Benevento	34	7	12	15	27	44	−17	26	Relegated to Serie D
18	Barletta	34	7	11	16	28	43	−15	25	Relegated to Serie D

== References and sources ==
- Almanacco Illustrato del Calcio - La Storia 1898-2004, Panini Edizioni, Modena, September 2005
