= Torneo Estivo del 1986 =

The Torneo Estivo del 1986 (1986 Summer Tournament) was an Italian official football competition organized by the Lega Calcio and contested by those Serie A teams that had been eliminated from the Coppa Italia before the semi–finals (i.e. all sixteen teams except Como, Fiorentina, Roma and Sampdoria). Players capped by the national team to take part in the upcoming World Cup did not take part in the tournament.

The final was played between Avellino and Bari at the Stadio Santa Colomba in Benevento, on 19 June. Avellino won the match 3–2 to claim the trophy.

== Format ==
The 12 participants were divided into three groups of four teams with single-legged matches, with the winners and runners-up of each group qualified to the next round. The six remaining sides were divided again in two group of three teams, still with single-legged matches. The two group winners contested the final.

== First group stage ==
Key to colours in group tables
Teams progressed to the second group stage

=== Group 1 ===
Team	Pld	W	D	L	GF	GA	GD	Pts
Pisa	3	1	2	0	1	0	+1	4
Juventus	3	1	1	1	4	3	+1	3
Hellas Verona	3	1	1	1	3	4	−1	3
Atalanta	3	1	0	2	3	4	−1	2

4 May 1986
Atalanta	2–1	Juventus
10 May 1986
Pisa	0–0	Juventus
17 May 1986
Pisa	1–0	Atalanta
28 May 1986
Atalanta	1–2	Verona
1 June 1986
Verona	0–0	Pisa
4 June 1986
Juventus	3–1	Verona

=== Group 2 ===
Team	Pld	W	D	L	GF	GA	GD	Pts
Avellino	3	3	0	0	8	2	+6	6
Bari	3	1	1	1	5	2	+3	3
Internazionale	3	0	2	1	3	4	−1	2
Napoli	3	0	1	2	2	10	−8	1

4 May 1986
Bari	4–0	Napoli
10 May 1986
Avellino	5–1	Napoli
17 May 1986
Avellino	1–0	Bari
25 May 1986
Napoli	1–1	Inter
28 May 1986
Bari	1–1	Inter
1 June 1986
Inter	1–2	Avellino

=== Group 3 ===
Team	Pld	W	D	L	GF	GA	GD	Pts
Torino	3	2	1	0	11	4	+7	5
Udinese	3	2	1	0	5	3	+2	5
Milan	3	0	1	2	2	5	−3	1
Lecce	3	0	1	2	1	7	−6	1

4 May 1986
Udinese	1–0	Milan
14 May 1986
Lecce	1–1	Milan
17 May 1986
Lecce	0–1	Udinese
28 May 1986
Torino	5–0	Lecce
31 May 1986
Udinese	3–3	Torino
4 June 1986
Milan	1–3	Torino

== Second group stage ==
Key to colours in group tables
Teams progressed to the final

=== Group 1 ===
Team	Pld	W	D	L	GF	GA	GD	Pts
Bari	2	1	1	0	5	3	+2	3
Pisa	2	1	0	1	4	5	−1	2
Torino	2	0	1	1	2	3	−1	1

7 June 1986
Bari	1–1	Torino
11 June 1986
Pisa	2–4	Bari
14 June 1986
Torino	1–2	Pisa

=== Group 2 ===
Team	Pld	W	D	L	GF	GA	GD	Pts
Avellino	2	2	0	0	8	2	+6	4
Udinese	2	1	0	1	2	5	−3	2
Juventus	2	0	0	2	1	4	−3	0

7 June 1986
Avellino	5–1	Udinese
11 June 1986
Juventus	1–3	Avellino
14 June 1986
Udinese	1–0	Juventus

== Final ==
19 June 1986

Avellino	3 – 2	Bari
Alessio 14', 77'; Benedetti 19'		Rideout 67'; Sclosa 78'

Stadio Santa Colomba, Benevento
Attendance: 1,000 approx.
Referee: Pierluigi Pairetto

Torneo Estivo del 1986
Winners
Avellino

== Top scorers ==
7 goals

- (Italy) Alessandro Bertoni (Avellino)

6 goals

- (Italy) Angelo Alessio (Avellino)
- (Italy) Pietro Mariani (Torino)
- (England) Paul Rideout (Bari)

3 goals

- (Austria) Walter Schachner (Torino)
