= US Avellino 1912 =

Italian football club

Avellino
- Full name: Unione Sportiva Avellino 1912
- Nicknames: I Lupi (The Wolves); I Biancoverdi (The White-Greens); Gli Irpini (The Irpinians)
- Founded: 12 December 1912; 113 years ago (first club); 1944; 82 years ago (as US Avellino); 2009; 17 years ago (as Avellino Calcio); 2018; 8 years ago (as US Avellino 1912)
- Stadium: Stadio Partenio-Adriano Lombardi
- Capacity: 26,000
- Owner: Gruppo D'Agostino
- President: Angelo Antonio D'Agostino
- Head coach: Alessandro Nesta
- League: Serie B
- 2025–26: Serie B, 8th of 20
- Website: usavellino1912.com
Home colours	Away colours	Third colours

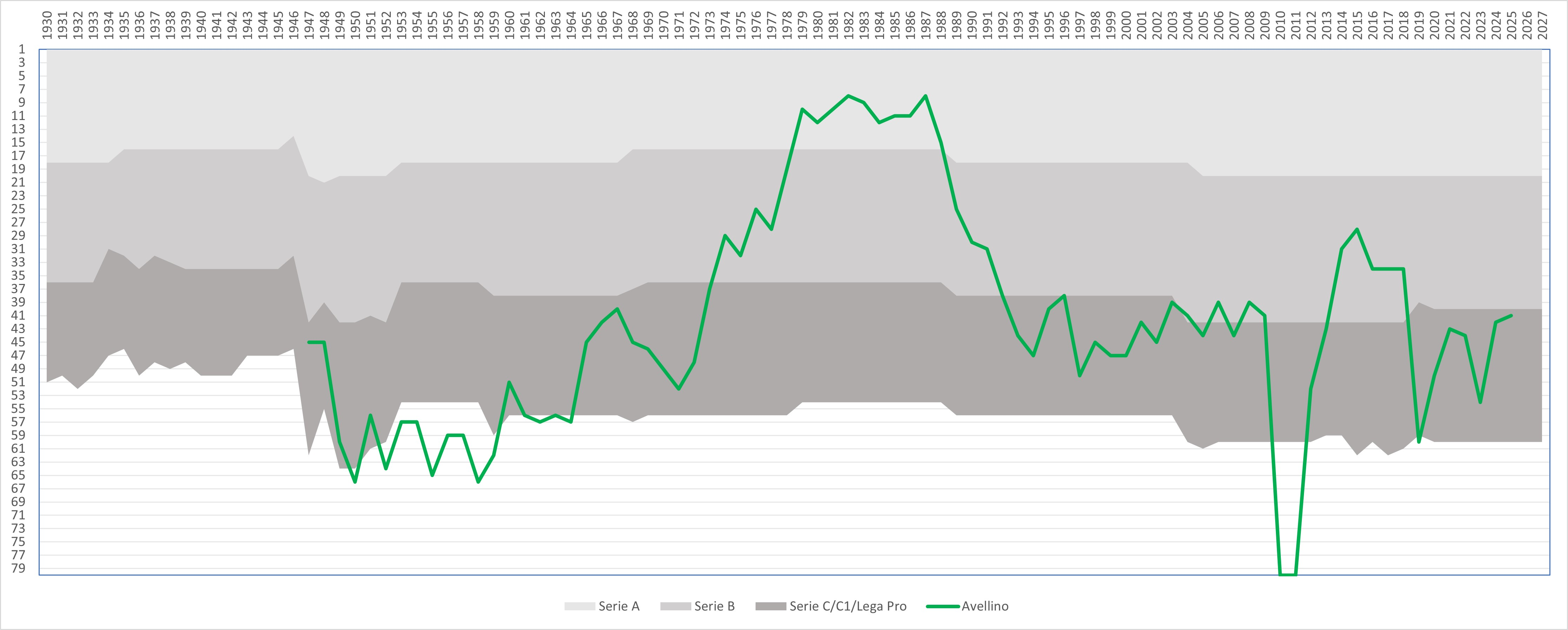
The performance of Avellino in the Italian football league structure since the first season of a unified Serie A (1929/30). For some seasons during the 1930s the club did not compete in the official league.

Unione Sportiva Avellino 1912, commonly referred to as US Avellino 1912, is an Italian professional football club based in Avellino, Campania. It competes in Serie B, the second tier of Italian football.

It is the official continuity club of US Avellino 1912, known worldwide for having competed in Serie A for ten consecutive seasons, from 1978–1979 to 1987–1988. The team went through two major reboots: once, in 2009, when it went bankrupt, and then, in 2018, when it was excluded from Serie B. In both cases, new clubs were founded to join the Serie D league.

The club was renamed as Avellino Calcio.12 Società Sportiva Dilettantistica in 2009, then Associazione Sportiva Avellino 1912 in 2010, and restored to the original Unione Sportiva Avellino 1912 in 2015, although initially taking the name Calcio Avellino Società Sportiva Dilettantistica for the 2018–2019 season.

== History ==
=== Foundation ===
The club was founded as U.S. Avellino on 12 December 1912 to give the town of Avellino a footballing representative. The early history of the club is quite obscure as they only competed at a lower level against regional sides. Avellino competed in IV Divisione from 1913 until after the Second World War; today's equivalent of that level is Serie D.

=== Post-war emergence ===
For the earlier part of their history the club did not achieve anything of note, until being placed in Serie C for the 1945–46 post-War season. In the 1946–47 season they narrowly missed out on getting through to the interregional final, after finishing third in their group.

Avellino beat out the likes of Catania, Reggina and Messina to win promotion to Serie B at the end of the 1940s. However, the club were accused of match fixing and the federation relegated them to Serie D. Although they were promoted to Serie C after one season, Avellino were relegated to spend six consecutive seasons at Serie D level.

Eventually Avellino returned, but, in six seasons, and Avellino gained promotion to Serie C in three of them and were relegated twice.

=== 1970s and 1980's: Ten consecutive seasons in Serie A and Torneo Estivo 1986 ===
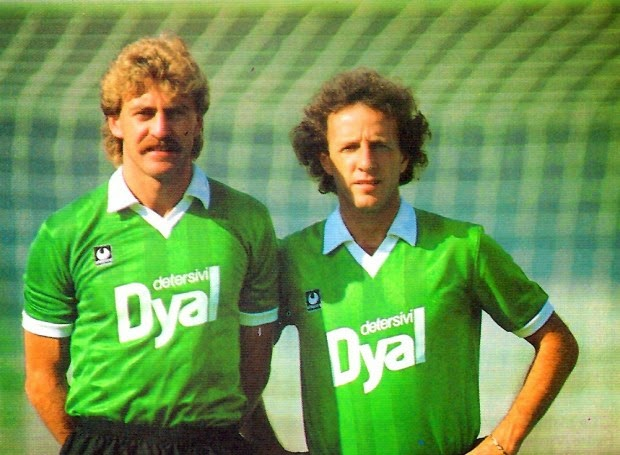
Walter Schachner and Dirceu with Avellino in 1986–87 season

Avellino were promoted to Serie B in 1973 and Serie A in 1978. A truly remarkable feat for a southern provincial side was a 10-year stay in Serie A (1978 to 1988), with the club holding a mid-table place for the majority of that period. Their best finish was 8th in 1987, with a team starring Angelo Alessio, Paolo Benedetti, Franco Colomba and Dirceu. During this decade the Wolves of Irpinia won the Torneo Estivo del 1986, a league-cup contested by all the Serie A eliminated before 1985–86 Coppa Italia semifinals. Avellino won the group B defeating SSC Napoli (5-1), SSC Bari (1-0) and Inter and the second semifinal group against Udinese (5-1) and Juventus (1-0). In the final of LNP Torneo Estivo 1986 they played on 19 June 1986 in Stadio Santa Colomba (Benevento), Avellino defeated 3-2 the il Bari with two goals scored by Alessio and one from Paolo Benedetti

=== 1990s and 2000s: decline, ups and downs, and bankruptcy ===
The club tended to shift between Serie B and Serie C1 in the decade following relegation from Serie A in 1988.

The club marked a surprising Serie B return after defeating neighbors and football powerhouse Napoli in the 2004-05 Serie C1/B play-off finals. An unsuccessful 2005–06 campaign ended in a loss on relegation playoffs to Albinoleffe (0–2, 3–2). The 2006–07 season, with Giuseppe Galderisi as head coach, then replaced by Giovanni Vavassori, ended in a second place in the Serie C1/B regular season; this was then followed by a successful campaign in the promotion play-offs, in which Avellino defeated Foggia in the finals, being therefore promoted to Serie B once again. However, this was followed by Vavassori's resignations on 16 July 2007, shortly after his confirmation as Avellino boss, being then replaced by Maurizio Sarri two days later. Sarri himself resigned one month later, being replaced by Guido Carboni and later Alessandro Calori. Despite this, the club did not manage to escape relegation, ending the season in 19th place. The club was however readmitted to Serie B later on to fill a league vacancy created by Messina's disbandment.

The team finished second from bottom in the 2008–09 season and was therefore relegated again. On 9 July 2009, the Covisoc (Commissione di Vigilanza sulle Società Calcistiche, Vigilancy Commission on Football Clubs) organization announced that the team did not pass the financial requirements in order to be admitted to the league. The club was allowed to appeal the decision until 11 July 2009. On 11 July, Avellino failed to appeal the exclusion.

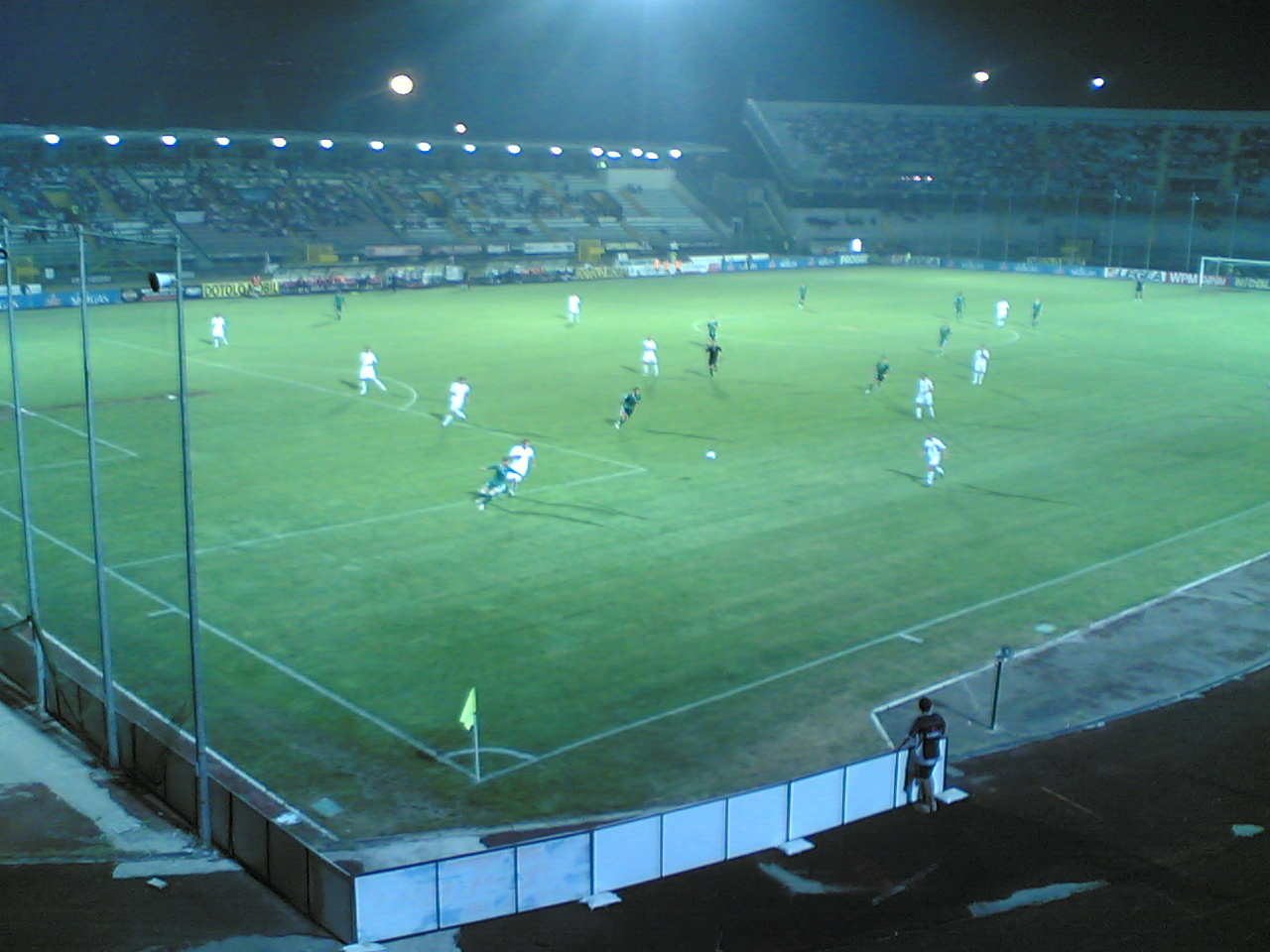
Avellino Reggiana Coppa Italia 2008-2009

=== Avellino Calcio.12 S.S.D. restarts from Serie D ===
A new club founded in the summer 2009 as Avellino Calcio.12 S.S.D. restarts from Serie D, finishing 5th, but 4 August 2010 they were later admitted to Lega Pro Seconda Divisione to fill vacancies. This ordeal saw them become the latest in a long line of Italian clubs that have faced severe financial difficulties, such as Napoli and Fiorentina.

=== From Lega Pro Seconda Divisione to Serie B ===
In the 2010–11 season the team became Associazione Sportiva Avellino 1912 and played in Lega Pro Seconda Divisione finishing 4th, being defeated by Trapani in the play-off final, but 4 August 2011 it was later admitted to Lega Pro Prima Divisione, again, to fill vacancies. In the season 2012–13 Avellino won Lega Pro Prima Divisione and the team obtained the promotion in Serie B, under manager Massimo Rastelli. In 2014–2015, Rastelli led the team to the play-off semi-finals, when they are eliminated by the more prestigious Bologna team despite a 3–2 win away.

=== 2018 Serie B exclusion ===
In 2018, Avellino was excluded from Serie B due to submitting a league membership paperwork that was deemed as incomplete, due to a late bank guarantee. Due to this, a new club was re-founded within days in order to submit application to play at Serie D instead. In 2019 Avellino won Serie D and the Scudetto Serie D, reaching the promotion in Serie C for the next season. In 2020–2021, they once again reached the play-off semi-finals, losing to Padova.

== Recent seasons ==
Season	Division	Tier	Pos	Pl	W	D	L	+	-	P	Cup	Note
as US Avellino 1912 (2015-18)
2016–17	Serie B	II	14	42	13	13	16	40	55	50	2nd round	
2017–18	Serie B	II	↓ 15	42	11	15	16	49	60	48	3rd round	Excluded and dissolved post-season. Calcio Avellino SSD, a phoenix club was admitted to Serie D
as Calcio Avellino SSD (2018-19)
2018–19	Serie D (Group G)	IV	↑ 1	38	26	5	7	70	36	83	–	Promoted to Serie C. Renamed back to US Avellino 1912 post-season
as US Avellino 1912 (2019-)
2019–20	Serie C (Group C)	III	10	30	11	7	12	34	38	40	–	Eliminated in the Promotion play-offs 1/32-finals to Ternana
2020–21	Serie C (Group C)	III	3	36	20	8	8	53	33	68	1st round	Eliminated in the Promotion play-offs semifinals to Padova
2021–22	Serie C (Group C)	III	4	36	17	13	6	45	26	64	Prelim. round	Eliminated in the Promotion play-offs 1/16-finals to Foggia
2022–23	Serie C (Group C)	III	14	38	11	10	17	42	49	43	–	
2023–24	Serie C (Group C)	III	2	38	20	9	9	62	29	69	–	Eliminated in the Promotion play-offs semifinals to Vicenza
2024–25	Serie C (Group C)	III	↑ 1	34	22	9	3	61	26	75	1st round	Promoted to Serie B
2025–26	Serie B	II	8	38	13	10	15	43	55	49	Prelim. round	Eliminated in the Promotion play-offs quarterfinals to Catanzaro

== Colours and badge ==
Its traditional colours are green and white. Avellino are nicknamed the "Lupi", which means wolves, and their club crest displays a wolf head.

== Players ==
As of 13 September 2026

Note: Flags indicate national team as defined under FIFA eligibility rules; some limited exceptions apply. Players may hold more than one non-FIFA nationality.

No.	Pos.	Nation	Player
1	GK	ITA	Antony Iannarilli
2	DF	ITA	Filippo Missori (on loan from Sassuolo)
3	DF	ITA	Marco Sala
4	DF	ITA	Armando Izzo
5	DF	ITA	Alessandro Di Bitonto (on loan from Sassuolo)
6	MF	ITA	Luca Palmiero (captain)
7	FW	ITA	Luca Pandolfi
8	MF	ITA	Luca Di Maggio
9	FW	MAR	Walid Cheddira
10	FW	ITA	Raffaele Russo
11	FW	CZE	Daniel Fila (on loan from Venezia)
14	FW	ITA	Tommaso Biasci
16	MF	ITA	Giacomo Faticanti (on loan from Juventus)
18	MF	ITA	Thomas Berenbruch (on loan from Inter Milan)
20	MF	NOR	Martin Palumbo

No.	Pos.	Nation	Player
22	GK	ITA	Jacopo Sassi
23	DF	ITA	Michael Venturi (on loan from Venezia)
24	MF	GRE	Dimitris Sounas
27	DF	ITA	Brando Moruzzi (on loan from Juventus)
29	DF	ITA	Tommaso Cancellotti
30	MF	ITA	Emanuele Adamo (on loan from Spezia)
39	MF	ITA	Michele Besaggio
44	DF	CRO	Lorenco Šimić
50	GK	ITA	Tommaso Martinelli (on loan from Fiorentina)
56	DF	ITA	Patrick Enrici
77	FW	ITA	Sebastiano Di Paolo (on loan from Cagliari)
99	FW	ITA	Andrea Favilli
—	DF	ITA	Matteo Di Paola
—	MF	GER	Noah Mutanda

=== Out on loan ===
Note: Flags indicate national team as defined under FIFA eligibility rules; some limited exceptions apply. Players may hold more than one non-FIFA nationality.

No.	Pos.	Nation	Player
—	DF	ITA	Alessandro Fontanarosa (at OH Leuven until 30 June 2027)
—	DF	ITA	Vittorio Gambardella (at Arzignano until 30 June 2027)
—	DF	ITA	Matteo Marchisano (at Giugliano until 30 June 2027)
—	DF	ITA	Carlo Mellino (at Treviso until 30 June 2027)
—	MF	ITA	Antonio De Cristofaro (at Latina until 30 June 2027)
—	MF	ITA	Alessio Tribuzzi (at Bari until 30 June 2027)

No.	Pos.	Nation	Player
—	MF	ITA	Matteo Vignoli (at Folgore Caratese until 30 June 2027)
—	FW	ITA	Michele D'Ausilio (at Pescara until 30 June 2027)
—	FW	ITA	Saverio D'Onofrio (at Desenzano until 30 June 2027)
—	FW	ITA	Filippo Scotti (at Savoia until 30 June 2027)
—	FW	COD	Arthur Spadoni (at Crotone until 30 June 2027)

=== Retired numbers ===
10 – (Italy) Adriano Lombardi, Midfielder (1975–79) – posthumous honor, number retired in 2007.

== Club staff ==
Position	Name
Head coach	(Italy) Alessandro Nesta
Assistant coach	(Italy) Vincenzo Riccio
Athletic coach	(Italy) Luigi Gennarelli (Italy) Luigi Garofalo
Goalkeeping coach	(Italy) Pasquale Visconti
Technical assistant coach	(Italy) Raffaele Ametrano (Italy) Ciro Santangelo (Italy) Davide Santeramo
Head of medical	(Italy) Andrea Massa
Social doctor - Health facilities representative	(Italy) Carmine Blasi
Physiotherapist	(Italy) Pasquale Maglio (Italy) Antonello Di Capua
Masseuse	(Italy) Alessandro Picariello
Consultant - Nutritionist	(Italy) Angelo Luca Ruzza
Kit manager	(Italy) Antonio De Luca
Youth sector manager	(Italy) Giuliano Capobianco
Youth sector secretary	(Italy) Alessandro Guarino
Social doctor	(Italy) Luigi Napolitano
Food coach	(Italy) Giuseppe Pasquariello

== Notable former coaches ==
- (Italy) Antonio Vojak (1947)
- (Italy) Oronzo Pugliese (1974–75)
- (Italy) Giuseppe Baldini (1976–77)
- (Brazil) Luís Vinício (1980–82)
- (Italy) Giuseppe Marchioro (1982)
- (Italy) Fernando Veneranda (1982–84)
- (Italy) Ottavio Bianchi (1983–84)
- (Socialist Federal Republic of Yugoslavia) Tomislav Ivić (1985–86)
- (Brazil) Luís Vinício (1986–88)
- (Italy) Enzo Ferrari (1988)
- (Italy) Eugenio Fascetti (1988–89)
- (Italy) Nedo Sonetti (1989–90)
- (Italy) Adriano Lombardi (1989–90)
- (Italy) Bruno Bolchi (1991–92)
- (Italy) Francesco Graziani (1991–92)
- (Italy) Adriano Lombardi (1992–93)
- (Italy) Giuseppe Papadopulo (1994–95)
- (Poland) Zbigniew Boniek (1994–96)
- (Italy) Corrado Orrico (1995–96)
- (Italy) Giuliano Zoratti (1996–97)
- (Italy) Adriano Lombardi (1997–98)
- (Italy) Giuliano Sonzogni (2001–02)
- (Italy) Massimo Ficcadenti (2002)
- (Czechoslovakia) Zdeněk Zeman (2003–04)
- (Italy) Antonello Cuccureddu (2004–05)
- (Italy) Franco Colomba (2005–06)
- (Italy) Giuseppe Galderisi (2006–07)
- (Italy) Giovanni Vavassori (2007)
- (Italy) Maurizio Sarri (2007)
- (Italy) Guido Carboni (2007–08)
- (Italy) Alessandro Calori (2008)
- (Italy) Giuseppe Incocciati (2008)
- (Italy) Salvatore Campilongo (2008–09)
- (Italy) Giovanni Bucaro (2011–12)
- (Italy) Massimo Rastelli (2012–15)
- (Italy) Attilio Tesser (2015–16)
- (Italy) Walter Novellino (2016–18)

== Honours ==
=== National titles ===
- Torneo Estivo del 1986
  - Winners: 1986
- Serie B
  - Runners-up: 1977–78
- Supercoppa di Lega di Prima Divisione
  - Champions: 2013
- Coppa Italia Serie C
  - Runners-up: 1972–73
- Scudetto Serie D
  - Champions: 2018–19

=== Interregional titles ===
- Serie C1
  - Champions: 2002–03, 2012–13
  - Runners-up: 1994–95, 2004–05, 2006–07
- Serie D
  - Champions: 1961–62, 1963–64, 2018–19

== Competitions ==
Level	Category	Participations	Debut	Last season	Total
1º	Serie A	10	1978–79	1987–88	10
2º	Serie B	19	1973–74	2017–18	16
3º	Serie C	18	1945–46	2019–20	33
3º	Serie C1	14	1992–93	2012–13	33
3º	Lega Pro Seconda Divisione	1	2010–11		33
4º	Seconda Divisione	3	1930–31	1935–36	19
4º	Prima Divisione	4	1940–41	1945	19
4º	Promozione	2	1949–50	1951–52	19
4º	IV Serie	5	1952–53	1956–57	19
4º	Interregionale	2	1957–58	1958–59	19
4º	Serie D	2	1961–62	1963–64	19
5º	Terza Divisione	2	1929–30	1932–33	5
5º	Seconda Divisione	1	1935–36		5
5º	Serie D	2	2009–10	2018–19	5
