= 1960–61 Serie B =

Italian football league season

Serie B
- Season: 1960–61
- Champions: Venezia; 1st title

Serie B 1960-61 team distribution

The Serie B 1960–61 was the twenty-ninth tournament of this competition played in Italy since its creation.

== Teams ==
Pro Patria, Prato and Foggia had been promoted from Serie C, while Palermo, Alessandria and Genoa had been relegated from Serie A.

== Final classification ==
| Pos | Team | Pld | W | D | L | GF | GA | GD | Pts | Promotion or relegation |
|---|---|---|---|---|---|---|---|---|---|---|
| 1 | Venezia (P, C) | 38 | 22 | 6 | 10 | 54 | 31 | +23 | 50 | Promotion to Serie A |
| 2 | Ozo Mantova (P) | 38 | 18 | 13 | 7 | 44 | 25 | +19 | 49 | Promotion to Serie A |
| 3 | Palermo (P) | 38 | 13 | 20 | 5 | 46 | 27 | +19 | 46 | Promotion to Serie A |
| 4 | Reggiana | 38 | 16 | 11 | 11 | 63 | 55 | +8 | 43 | |
| 5 | Simmenthal-Monza | 38 | 14 | 14 | 10 | 36 | 26 | +10 | 42 | |
| 6 | Messina | 38 | 13 | 15 | 10 | 45 | 34 | +11 | 41 | |
| 7 | Pro Patria | 38 | 14 | 11 | 13 | 46 | 39 | +7 | 39 | |
| 7 | Alessandria | 38 | 15 | 9 | 14 | 43 | 41 | +2 | 39 | |
| 7 | Sambenedettese | 38 | 15 | 9 | 14 | 35 | 42 | −7 | 39 | |
| 10 | Catanzaro | 38 | 15 | 8 | 15 | 46 | 42 | +4 | 38 | |
| 11 | Como | 38 | 13 | 11 | 14 | 42 | 45 | −3 | 37 | |
| 11 | Prato | 38 | 14 | 9 | 15 | 35 | 41 | −6 | 37 | |
| 13 | Genoa (Note: 7 points deducted.) | 38 | 14 | 14 | 10 | 47 | 42 | +5 | 35 | |
| 13 | Parma | 38 | 12 | 11 | 15 | 35 | 36 | −1 | 35 | |
| 15 | Brescia | 38 | 12 | 10 | 16 | 44 | 38 | +6 | 34 | |
| 15 | Verona | 38 | 11 | 12 | 15 | 31 | 44 | −13 | 34 | |
| 17 | Novara | 38 | 11 | 11 | 16 | 31 | 51 | −20 | 33 | Relegation tie-breaker |
| 18 | Triestina (R) | 38 | 9 | 15 | 14 | 31 | 39 | −8 | 33 | Serie C after tie-breaker |
| 19 | Foggia (R) | 38 | 10 | 9 | 19 | 41 | 56 | −15 | 29 | Relegation to Serie C |
| 20 | Marzotto (R) | 38 | 5 | 10 | 23 | 28 | 69 | −41 | 20 | Relegation to Serie C |

Source: Panini
(C) Champions; (P) Promoted; (R) Relegated

== Results ==
| Home \ Away | ALE | BRE | CTZ | COM | FOG | GEN | MAR | MES | NOV | OZO | PAL | PAR | PRA | PPA | REA | SBN | SMN | TRI | VEN | HEL |
|---|---|---|---|---|---|---|---|---|---|---|---|---|---|---|---|---|---|---|---|---|
| Alessandria | | 1–0 | 0–3 | 4–0 | 3–2 | 0–0 | 0–0 | 4–2 | 4–1 | 1–1 | 1–0 | 0–0 | 1–0 | 2–0 | 2–1 | 1–0 | 0–1 | 1–1 | 2–1 | 2–0 |
| Brescia | 2–0 | | 2–1 | 4–1 | 1–0 | 0–0 | 3–0 | 1–1 | 8–0 | 2–0 | 0–0 | 2–1 | 1–2 | 0–1 | 1–1 | 2–0 | 0–0 | 1–0 | 1–2 | 1–0 |
| Catanzaro | 2–1 | 2–1 | | 3–2 | 3–1 | 4–1 | 4–0 | 0–0 | 2–0 | 1–2 | 1–1 | 1–2 | 2–0 | 1–0 | 3–1 | 1–0 | 1–0 | 3–2 | 0–0 | 1–0 |
| Como | 0–2 | 0–0 | 1–0 | | 3–1 | 2–2 | 1–1 | 0–0 | 2–1 | 1–0 | 0–0 | 1–0 | 2–1 | 2–1 | 4–1 | 3–0 | 1–1 | 3–0 | 2–1 | 1–2 |
| Foggia | 1–0 | 0–0 | 3–0 | 2–0 | | 0–1 | 4–1 | 2–1 | 0–0 | 0–0 | 2–3 | 1–2 | 2–2 | 2–1 | 1–0 | 1–1 | 0–0 | 2–1 | 0–2 | 2–1 |
| Genoa | 1–2 | 2–0 | 1–1 | 0–0 | 3–2 | | 1–2 | 1–1 | 1–0 | 2–4 | 0–0 | 3–0 | 1–1 | 1–0 | 0–1 | 5–0 | 3–1 | 2–2 | 2–0 | 3–1 |
| Marzotto | 1–0 | 1–4 | 0–0 | 1–0 | 3–0 | 0–2 | | 1–1 | 2–2 | 1–1 | 2–0 | 0–2 | 0–1 | 1–1 | 0–1 | 0–1 | 1–3 | 2–2 | 0–2 | 1–1 |
| Messina | 3–1 | 3–1 | 2–2 | 1–2 | 1–0 | 0–1 | 2–0 | | 1–1 | 3–0 | 3–0 | 1–1 | 1–0 | 1–1 | 3–0 | 1–2 | 1–0 | 1–0 | 1–0 | 1–0 |
| Novara | 1–1 | 1–0 | 3–1 | 1–0 | 2–1 | 0–4 | 2–1 | 3–1 | | 0–0 | 2–0 | 1–0 | 4–1 | 1–0 | 2–0 | 0–1 | 0–0 | 0–0 | 0–2 | 0–0 |
| Ozo Mantova | 1–0 | 2–0 | 3–1 | 0–0 | 1–1 | 3–0 | 3–0 | 0–0 | 1–0 | | 0–0 | 2–1 | 3–1 | 1–0 | 5–1 | 1–0 | 2–0 | 2–1 | 1–0 | 0–1 |
| Palermo | 0–0 | 2–0 | 0–0 | 0–0 | 3–0 | 1–1 | 2–1 | 2–2 | 0–0 | 0–0 | | 3–0 | 1–0 | 3–1 | 3–3 | 3–0 | 0–0 | 2–0 | 3–1 | 5–0 |
| Parma | 3–0 | 3–0 | 1–0 | 3–2 | 1–1 | 0–0 | 3–0 | 0–0 | 1–0 | 0–1 | 0–0 | | 2–0 | 0–0 | 0–1 | 2–1 | 1–0 | 1–2 | 1–1 | 0–1 |
| Prato | 2–1 | 2–1 | 1–0 | 2–1 | 0–2 | 0–1 | 1–0 | 0–0 | 3–0 | 1–0 | 0–1 | 1–1 | | 0–0 | 2–1 | 1–0 | 1–3 | 1–0 | 1–1 | 0–0 |
| Pro Patria | 3–1 | 2–1 | 1–1 | 2–0 | 2–1 | 2–0 | 3–0 | 1–0 | 0–0 | 1–1 | 0–0 | 1–1 | 1–0 | | 1–1 | 2–1 | 0–1 | 3–0 | 2–1 | 3–1 |
| Reggiana | 2–1 | 1–1 | 2–0 | 1–0 | 5–3 | 5–0 | 4–1 | 1–3 | 4–1 | 0–0 | 3–3 | 1–1 | 2–3 | 4–2 | | 4–0 | 1–0 | 1–1 | 2–1 | 1–0 |
| Sambenedettese | 2–2 | 1–1 | 3–0 | 3–1 | 1–0 | 0–0 | 2–0 | 0–0 | 2–1 | 2–0 | 1–1 | 2–0 | 1–1 | 0–2 | 1–1 | | 1–0 | 1–0 | 1–0 | 2–0 |
| Simm.-Monza | 1–1 | 0–0 | 1–0 | 2–1 | 2–0 | 1–1 | 3–0 | 1–1 | 3–0 | 0–0 | 0–0 | 1–0 | 1–2 | 4–3 | 2–0 | 0–1 | | 1–0 | 2–1 | 0–0 |
| Triestina | 2–0 | 1–0 | 1–0 | 1–2 | 3–0 | 2–1 | 0–0 | 1–0 | 2–0 | 0–0 | 0–0 | 2–0 | 1–1 | 1–1 | 1–1 | 0–0 | 0–0 | | 0–2 | 0–0 |
| Venezia | 1–0 | 2–1 | 2–1 | 0–0 | 2–0 | 4–0 | 2–1 | 2–1 | 2–1 | 3–2 | 2–0 | 2–1 | 1–0 | 1–0 | 1–1 | 3–0 | 1–0 | 4–1 | | 1–0 |
| Hellas Verona | 0–1 | 2–1 | 1–0 | 1–1 | 1–1 | 0–0 | 5–3 | 2–1 | 0–0 | 0–1 | 1–4 | 1–0 | 1–0 | 3–2 | 2–3 | 2–1 | 1–1 | 0–0 | 0–0 | |

Source: Almanacco Illustrato del Calcio - La Storia 1898-2004, Panini Edizioni, Modena, September 2005 (in Italian)
Legend: Blue = home team win; Yellow = draw; Red = away team win.

== Relegation tie-breaker ==
Played in Ferrara

| Team 1 | Score | Team 2 |
|---|---|---|
| Novara (Italy) | 2-1(aet) | (Italy) Triestina |

Triestina relegated to Serie C.

== References and sources ==
- Almanacco Illustrato del Calcio - La Storia 1898-2004, Panini Edizioni, Modena, September 2005
