= Vasco Tagliavini =

Italian footballer and manager (1937–2019)

Personal information
- Date of birth: 17 October 1937
- Place of birth: Reggio Emilia, Italy
- Date of death: 3 July 2019 (aged 81)
- Position: Defender

Senior career*
Years	Team	Apps	(Gls)
1956–1960	Internazionale	39	(0)
1960–1964	Udinese	140	(1)
1964–1967	Foggia	64	(0)
1967–1969	Novara	42	(0)
1969–1971	Jesi	34	(0)
1971–1972	Paganese	25	(0)

Managerial career
- 1976–1980: Triestina
- 1981–1982: Foggia
- 1982–1983: Treviso
- 1991–1992: Italy (futsal)
- * Club domestic league appearances and goals

Vasco Tagliavini (17 October 1937 – 3 July 2019) was an Italian professional football player and coach who also coached the Italy national futsal team. He played for many years in the Italian leagues.
