= Renzo Ulivieri =

Italian football manager (born 1941)

Personal information
- Date of birth: 2 February 1941 (age 85)
- Place of birth: San Miniato, Italy
- Position: Midfielder

Youth career
- Fiorentina

Senior career*
Years	Team	Apps	(Gls)
1965–1966	Cuoiopelli		

Managerial career
- 1966–1967: Cuoiopelli
- 1967–1968: San Miniato
- 1968–1971: Prato (youth team)
- 1971–1972: Fucecchio
- 1972–1976: Empoli
- 1976–1978: Fiorentina (youth team)
- 1978–1979: Ternana
- 1979–1980: Vicenza
- 1980–1981: Perugia
- 1981–1984: Sampdoria
- 1984–1986: Cagliari
- 1989–1991: Modena
- 1991–1994: Vicenza
- 1994–1998: Bologna
- 1998–1999: Napoli
- 1999–2000: Cagliari
- 2001: Parma
- 2002–2003: Torino
- 2004–2005: Padova
- 2005: Bologna
- 2006–2007: Bologna
- 2007–2008: Reggina
- * Club domestic league appearances and goals

Renzo Ulivieri (born 2 February 1941) is an Italian football manager. He is the current chairman of the Associazione Italiana Allenatori Calcio (Italian Football Managers' Association).

== Career ==
After a very short playing career as a midfielder for the Fiorentina youth team and Serie C team Cuoiopelli, Ulivieri became coach for Cuoiopelli in 1966, after the team were relegated to Serie D. He then coached several other amateur teams in Tuscany, such as San Miniato, Fucecchio, and the Prato youth squad.

In 1972, he joined Serie C side Empoli, where he served as head coach for three seasons. He then spent two years as Fiorentina youth coach before Ulivieri signing for Ternana of Serie B in 1978. He made his Serie A debut in 1980 for Perugia. Since then, Ulivieri served as head coach for numerous clubs all around the country. His best results were a double consecutive promotion from Serie C1 to Serie A with Bologna, a Torneo di Viareggio with Fiorentina in 1978, and a promotion to Serie A with Sampdoria in 1981–82. In 1986 he was involved in the 1986 Totonero scandal and sentenced with a three-year ban, which was also confirmed on appeal. He returned to coach Bologna in 2005, but was fired soon after following a series of poor results. He was however recalled in March 2006, after his replacement Andrea Mandorlini did not manage to improve the team's results. Ulivieri also coached Bologna during the 2006–07 season, but was fired on 14 April 2007 after a 3–0 away loss to Genoa, and following weeks of disputes with club chairman Alfredo Cazzola.

In November 2007, he was appointed at the helm of relegation-battling Serie A side Reggina to replace Massimo Ficcadenti. On 3 March 2008, Ulivieri was sacked by Reggina after a string of results where they picked up only four points from seven league games.

== Personal life ==
Ulivieri is also well known for his left-wing political stance (he is a former Democrats of the Left and Italian Communist Party member). In a 2013 interview with the Italian edition of Vanity Fair, he discussed his left-wing political views, and also spoke out against homophobia in football.

== Honours ==
=== Manager ===
Modena

- Serie C1: 1989–90

Bologna

- Serie C1: 1994–95
- Serie B: 1995–96
