= Lajos Kovács (footballer) =

Hungarian footballer and manager

Personal information
- Full name: Lajos Nemes Kovács
- Date of birth: 27 April 1894
- Place of birth: Budapest, Hungary
- Date of death: 10 January 1973 (aged 78)
- Place of death: Lugano, Switzerland

Senior career*
Years	Team	Apps	(Gls)
1925–1927	Novara		
- MTK Hungária

International career
1922	Hungary	2	(0)

Managerial career
- 1927–1929: VfB Stuttgart
- 1930–1932: Padova
- 1932–1933: Roma
- 1933–1935: Bologna
- 1936–1937: Triestina
- 1946: Alessandria
- 1949–1950: Cagliari
- * Club domestic league appearances and goals

Lajos Nemes Kovács (27 April 1894 – 10 January 1973) was a Hungarian footballer and manager from Budapest. He had a career as a footballing manager in Italy at clubs such as Roma, Bologna and Alessandria.
