= ASD Calcio Club Vittoria 2020 =

Italian football club

Vittoria
- Full name: Associazione Sportiva Dilettantistica; Calcio Club Vittoria 2020; SRL
- Founded: 1968; 1994 (refounded); 2006 (refounded); 2015 (refounded); 2017 (refounded); 2020 (refounded)
- Ground: Stadio Comunale, Vittoria, Italy
- Capacity: 5,000
- League: Promozione
| Home colours | Away colours |

A.S.D. Calcio Club Vittoria 2020 is an Italian association football club, based in Vittoria, Sicily.

== History ==
The club was founded in 1968. After years as an amateur club, Vittoria were first promoted to Serie C2 in 1978, being relegated back to Serie D only two years later. The club went bankrupt in 1994 and was refounded as A.S. Vittoria, resuming from Promozione and returning to Serie D in 1997.

In 2003, under the guidance of head coach Domenico Giacomarro and with the new denomination of F.C. Vittoria, they returned to Serie C2 as Serie D playoff winners to fill a league vacancy.

A second consecutive promotion to Serie C1 followed in 2004 with Nevio Orlandi as manager, again after winning the league playoffs. The club's stay in the Italian third division however lasted only one season, as they were relegated back to Serie C2 the following year. A number of financial problems then led the club to a disastrous season in 2005–06 and a second consecutive relegation, then followed by exclusion from the Italian football system, being replaced by Junior Vittoria as the top club in the city. The club played and won Prima Categoria in 2006–07 season, being therefore promoted to Promozione. Junior Vittoria merged with P.D. Comiso soon after, forming A.C.D. Città di Vittoria and playing in Serie D for the 2007–08 season. This new club did not however have any success, and was excluded itself in 2015, after being relegated to Promozione, due to financial struggles.

More attempts to restart the club in 2015 and 2017 followed with little success as well. In 2020, Club Calcio Vittoria was founded and admitted to Promozione.

== Colours and badge ==
Vittoria's official colours are red and white.
