= Giuseppe Pillon =

Italian football manager (born 1956)

Personal information
- Date of birth: 8 February 1956 (age 70)
- Place of birth: Preganziol, Italy
- Position: Midfielder

Youth career
- Pro Mogliano
- Juventus

Senior career*
Years	Team	Apps	(Gls)
- Alessandria
- Seregno
- Padova
- Pordenone
- Prato
- Asti
- Spezia
- Giorgione
- Treviso
- Pro Mogliano

Managerial career
- 1992–1993: Salvarosa
- 1993–1994: Bassano
- 1994–1997: Treviso
- 1997–1998: Padova
- 1998: Genoa
- 2000: Lumezzane
- 2000: Pistoiese
- 2001–2003: Ascoli
- 2003–2004: Bari
- 2004–2005: Treviso
- 2005–2006: Chievo Verona
- 2007–2008: Treviso
- 2008–2009: Reggina
- 2009–2010: Ascoli
- 2010–2011: Livorno
- 2011: Empoli
- 2013: Reggina
- 2014: Carpi
- 2015: Pisa
- 2015–2016: Padova
- 2017: Alessandria
- 2018–2019: Pescara
- 2020: Cosenza
- 2020–2021: Triestina
- * Club domestic league appearances and goals

Giuseppe "Bepi" Pillon (born 8 February 1956) is an Italian football manager and former player.

== Playing career ==
Born in Preganziol, Province of Treviso, Pillon moved his first footsteps into football with hometown team Pro Mogliano, before to join Juventus's youth ranks for three years. He then played mostly for Serie C1 and Serie C2 teams throughout his career, including a four-year spell at Padova and three seasons with Spezia. He spent his two last seasons as a player at Pro Mogliano.

== Coaching career ==
=== Early years: from amateurs to Serie B ===
Pillon started his coaching career in 1992 with amateur Interregionale team Salvarosa. He went on to become Bassano coach the next season before joining Treviso in 1994, leading them through three consecutive promotion from Interregionale to Serie B. In 1997, he left Treviso to accept an offer from Padova of Serie B in 1997, only to be sacked in a few weeks. This was followed by another unsuccessful spell at Genoa in 1998, before being appointed as Lumezzane boss during the 1999–2000 Serie C1 season. He returned to coach in the Serie B in 2000–01 as Pistoiese boss. In 2001–02 he led Ascoli to win the Serie C1 title, heading the bianconeri also in their successive Serie B campaign.

After starting the 2003–04 season without a job, he was appointed at the helm of Serie B team Bari in January 2004, leading the galletti out of the relegation zone.

=== Serie A and Europe with Treviso and Chievo ===
In the following season, he was appointed by his former team Treviso, leading them to an impressive season which ensured them a spot in the promotion playoffs. He was consequently appointed by Serie A team Chievo Verona for their 2005–06 campaign which ended in a very impressive sixth place; this was later elevated to third following the 2006 Serie A scandal events, meaning Chievo would have awarded a spot in the UEFA Champions League 2006-07 third qualifying round, which they however lost to Levski Sofia. A low start in their Serie A 2006–07 campaign then convinced the Chievo management to sack Pillon, replacing him with Luigi Delneri.

=== The season 2007–08 ===
During the summer of 2007, he was announced as new Treviso boss for their 2007–08 Serie B campaign in a third spell at the club for Pillon, with his brother Albino as assistant manager. This new experience however proved not to be as successful as it was initially expected, and Treviso found themselves in the bottom part of the table, escaping relegation in the final weeks of the season. In July 2008 Treviso announced to have agreed a mutual consent leave with Pillon.

=== The season 2008–09 ===
On 16 December 2008 Pillon was announced as new head coach of Serie A relegation strugglers Reggina Calcio, being appointed as replacement for Nevio Orlandi, dismissed because of poor results with the amaranto. His tenure with Reggina however lasted just a month, being dismissed on 29 January 2009 due to poor results.

=== Back to Ascoli in the season 2009–10 ===
In November 2009 he was appointed head coach of Ascoli, a team he already coached from 2001 to 2003, replacing Alessandro Pane.

Pillon gained nationwide news after he was protagonist of a highly unusual fair play action during a Serie B league game versus Reggina: after his side questionably scored a goal while a Reggina player was lying injured on the pitch, he requested his players to allow the opponent team to score; the game then ended in a 3–1 home loss for Ascoli, and such choice was heatedly criticized by the local fans. The game events and his reactions, with Pillon defending his actions and declaring himself critical of the belligerent atmosphere in Italian football, were then cited as the reason for him being awarded the 2009 International Fair Play prize.

=== Livorno ===
In June 2010 Pillon was announced as new head coach of recently relegated Serie B club Livorno. Following an unimpressive first half of season, Pillon was relieved of his managerial duties on 14 February 2011 following a 0–1 loss to minnows Portogruaro.

=== Empoli ===
On 3 October 2011, Pillon became the new coach of Empoli in Serie B, in place of the sacked Alfredo Aglietti. On 20 November 2011 he has been sacked and replaced by Guido Carboni.

=== Pescara ===
On 4 April 2018, he was appointed manager of Serie B club Pescara. He left Pescara at the end of the 2018–19 season.

=== Cosenza ===
On 11 February 2020, Pillon returned into management, being hired at the helm of relegation-threatened Serie B club Cosenza. His stint as Cosenza coach did not however last long, as he submitted his resignations a month later for personal reasons in the midst of the football activities halt caused by the COVID-19 pandemic in Italy.

=== Triestina ===
On 2 December 2020 he was named head coach of Serie C promotion hopefuls Triestina, taking over from Carmine Gautieri. He left Triestina at the end of the 2020–21 season.
