= AS Reggina 1914 =

Football club based in Reggio Calabria, Italy

Reggina
- Full name: Associazione Sportiva Reggina 1914
- Nickname: Gli Amaranto (The Amaranth)
- Founded: 1914; 112 years ago, as US Reggio Calabria; 2015; 11 years ago, as Reggio Calabria; 2023; 3 years ago, as AS Reggina 1914
- Ground: Stadio Oreste Granillo
- Capacity: 27,763
- Owner: Claudio Lotito
- Manager: Marco Marchionni
- League: Serie D Group I
- 2023–24: Serie D Group I, 4th of 20
- Website: www.reggina1914.it
Home colours	Away colours

Associazione Sportiva Reggina 1914, commonly referred to as Reggina, is an Italian football club based in Reggio Calabria. They play their home matches at the 27,763-seater Stadio Oreste Granillo and are currently playing in the Serie D.

They are nicknamed the Amaranto (amaranth) after their official dark red colour. The club was formerly known as Reggina Calcio before declaring bankruptcy in 2015, as well as A.S.D. Reggio Calabria in the 2015–16 season, Urbs Reggina 1914 from 2016 to 2019, Reggina 1914 from 2019 to 2023, and LFA Reggio Calabria in the 2023–24 season.

In its previous guise, the club played in the Serie A for nine seasons between 1999 and 2009, including a seven-year consecutive run from 2002. During these years, the club narrowly avoided relegation in most seasons and never finished in the top half of the table. After failing to return in the first few years, the club fell into financial and sporting difficulties, culminating in relegation to the lower tiers of Italian football before returning to Serie B in 2020.

== Names ==
The club was founded on 11 January 1914 as Unione Sportiva Reggio Calabria. It changed name many times (Società Calcistica Reggio, Reggio Foot Ball Club, Associazione Sportiva Reggina, Società Sportiva La Dominante), finally assuming the denomination Reggina Calcio in 1986.

After the 2015 bankruptcy, the club had used A.S.D. Reggio Calabria as the new name of the new legal person, and then the club changed to the denomination Urbs Reggina 1914 S.r.l. in 2016, and, between 2019 and 2023, Reggina 1914 S.r.l..

Following the most recent club exclusion in 2023, the club was refounded as LFA Reggio Calabria.

== History ==
The club was founded on 11 January 1914.

In 1986, Pasquale "Lillo" Foti became managing director of the newly re-formed and renamed Reggina Calcio. In 1991, he became president.

=== Serie A (1999–2009) ===
From the late 1990s to the 2000s, Reggina has been alternating between the top two levels of the Italian league system. They reached the top division of Italian football, Serie A, for the first time in 1999. Two years later, they lost a relegation playout to Verona, being consequently relegated to 2001–02 Serie B. Reggina finished third in Serie B in 2002, earning a return to Serie A. In 2003, Reggina survived a relegation playout against Atalanta. They would spend the next 7 years maintaining their Serie A status until their eventual relegation in the 2008–09 season.

In August 2006, they were indicted as part of the second wave of Calciopoli investigations. Originally punished with a 15-point deduction for the 2006–07 Serie A, then reduced to 11 points following appeal. Despite the heavy deduction of points, Reggina managed to save themselves from relegation, defeating newly crowned UEFA Champions League winners Milan on the final matchday and ending the season with 40 points (including the deduction), just one single point above the third relegation spot, occupied by Chievo. They poorly started the Serie A 2007-08, causing head coach Massimo Ficcadenti to be sacked and replaced by Renzo Ulivieri. A third managerial change, with Ulivieri fired and replacing with team scout Nevio Orlandi, proved to be successful as Reggina improved their results and performances, escaping relegation with key wins at Catania, and home to Empoli. Orlandi was subsequently confirmed at the helm of the amaranto for the Serie A 2008–09.

=== Serie B (2009–2014) ===
Since their relegation in the 2008–09 season, Reggina has become slightly inconsistent in their attempts to return to Italy's top flight. The 2009–10 season would see three coaches at the helm: Walter Novellino, Ivo Iaconi, Roberto Breda. Despite possessing Bonazzoli, Carmona, Tedesco, Brienza, and homegrown star Missiroli, they were unable to improve on 13th. Disappointing for a team just relegated from the top division. The top goalscorer for the campaign was Franco Brienza with 12 goals.

The 2010–11 season was regarded as one of the Amaranto's best in Serie B. Shockingly they would conduct their usual coaching merry-go-round, as Gianluca Atzori would lead them to a 6th-place finish and playoffs to Serie A. they would stumble at the last hurdle losing to Novara in a two-legged playoff. Top players include Acerbi, Missiroli, Tedesco, Brienza, Bonazzoli (C) and Milan Loanee Adiyiah. Top goal scorer: Bonazzoli with 19 goals

The 2011–12 season was another disappointing season for the Amaranto, with a 12th-placed finish. Two coaches took charge of Reggina this season: Roberto Breda initially, before being sacked and replaced by Angelo Gregucci, only to be replaced by Breda again towards the end of the season. Unlike the previous season, they did not make the play-offs.

The 2012–13 season would be marred by yet another controversy similar to that of 2006. Reggina were penalized for the latest match-fixing scandal that hit Italian shores and were given a −4 penalty as a result. After appeal it was reduced to −2 instead. They were in contention for playoff places right up to the last few rounds, but poor form saw them finish 11th.

The 2013–14 season ended in disaster, as Reggina won just six out of 42 games and finished second bottom, resulting in relegation to Lega Pro. The season also marked Foti's retirement from his role as president, with Giuseppe Ranieri taking over.

=== Lega Pro ===
For the club's 2014–15 Lega Pro campaign, Reggina began the season with former captain Francesco Cozza as head coach. After a difficult start to the season and two coaching changes, youth team coach and former player Giacomo Tedesco was hired as head coach for the final three weeks of the season. Despite winning two of the final three matches, Reggina finished last in the league and would have to rely on an appeal of their point penalty to lift them out of the relegation zone. The appeal was successful, and 2 points were returned, moving them out of last place. Tedesco guided the team to survival in the playoff over rivals Messina.

=== Serie D one-year stint ===
Despite avoiding relegation in the 2014–15 season, Reggina failed to meet the deadline to register for Lega Pro and the club declared bankruptcy. A new legal person of the club, "A.S.D. Reggio Calabria", was formed to play in Serie D for the 2015–16 season, Reggio Calabria ended the season in 4th place, losing in the first round of playoffs against Cavese. During the season, the club also re-incorporated from associazione sportiva dilettantistica to società sportiva dilettantistica a responsabilità limitata legal form.

Reggio Calabria was owned by Mimmo Praticò, former regional president of CONI.

=== Back to Serie C ===
In June 2016, it was reported that the club was renamed from "S.S.D. Reggio Calabria a r.l." to "S.S.D. Urbs Sportiva Reggina 1914 a r.l.". The club was then renamed as Urbs Reggina 1914 S.r.l.

Despite finishing as the losing side in the first round of the promotion playoffs of 2015–16 Serie D, the club filed for Lega Pro (later renamed Serie C) repechage to fill one of the vacancies for the 2016–17 season and was successfully admitted. Reggina ended the season in 13th place.

In January 2019, facing a crisis with a potential player strike due to non-payment of salaries, the club was sold to Italian entrepreneur Luca Gallo.

On 1 July 2019, the club announced a change in name to "Reggina 1914 S.r.l.".

=== Serie B return ===
Reggina won its Serie C group in 2020, earning a promotion back to the Serie B for the upcoming season. The team, upon its Serie B return, included experienced players from higher levels, including Jérémy Ménez and Germán Denis.

In the 2022-23 season under the guidance of manager Filippo Inzaghi, Reggina finished in a playoff position, despite suffering a five-point deduction for failing to pay taxes and player salaries on time. The deduction was initially seven points, but was reduced to five following an appeal.

=== 2023 exclusion and restart ===
On 1 July 2023, Reggina was excluded from Serie B for the 2023-24 season after Covisoc rejected their application due to financial irregularities. On appeal, the Federal Council confirmed Reggina's exclusion. At the next level of appeal, the Collegio di Garanzia of the Italian Olympic Committee withheld the decision. On 3 August, the Administrative Court of Rome again rejected Reggina's request for readmission. On 30 August, Reggina was again rejected at the final level of appeals, the Council of State. Brescia was readmitted to the league after Reggina's confirmed exclusion.

On 1 September 2023, acting mayor of the Metropolitan City of Reggio Calabria, Paolo Brunetti, received approval from the Italian Football Federation to enroll a club in Serie D for the 2023–24 season. The club was successively handed over to a Catania-based consortium led by Antonino Ballarino, named La Fenice Amaranto (The amaranth phoenix), which submitted a league application and will take part to the season under the new denomination of LFA Reggio Calabria, as the new club was forbidden to use the Reggina 1914 name or logo for the upcoming season.

On 29 May 2024, Ballarino and LFA Reggio Calabria acquired the rights to the name and history of Reggina; the club was formally renamed to AS Reggina 1914 on 18 July 2024.

== Recent seasons ==
Season	Division	Tier	Pos	Pl	W	D	L	+	-	P	Cup	Note
2016–17	Lega Pro (Group C)	III	13	38	10	15	13	44	54	45	–	
2017–18	Serie C (Group C)	III	15	36	9	14	13	29	38	41	–	
2018–19	Serie C (Group C)	III	7	36	16	8	12	45	33	52	–	Eliminated in the Promotion play-offs 1/8-finals to Catania
2019–20	Serie C (Group C)	III	↑ 1	30	21	6	3	54	19	69	2nd round	Promoted to Serie B
2020–21	Serie B	II	11	38	12	14	12	42	45	50	3rd round	
2021–22	Serie B	II	14	38	13	9	16	31	49	46	1st round	
2022–23	Serie B	II	↓ 7	38	17	4	17	49	45	50	1st round	Eliminated in the Promotion play-offs quarterfinals to Südtirol. Excluded and dissolved post-season. LFA Reggio Calabria, a phoenix club, was admitted to Serie D
as LFA Reggio Calabria (2023–24)
2023–24	Serie D (Group I)	IV	4	34	19	8	7	54	25	65	–	Lost the wild card play-off (Group I) final to Siracusa. Renamed back to AS Reggina 1914 post-season
as AS Reggina 1914 (2024–)
2024–25	Serie D (Group I)	IV	2	32	24	5	3	65	22	77	–	Won the wild card play-offs (Group I), but remained in Serie D
2025–26	Serie D (Group I)	IV	3	33	19	6	8	40	21	63	–	Lost the wild card play-off (Group I) final to Nissa

== Honours ==
- Serie C:
  - 1964–65 (group C), 2019–20 (group C)
- Serie C1:
  - 1994–95 (group B)
- Serie C2:
  - 1983–84 (group C)
- IV Serie:
  - 1955–56 (group H)

== Rivalries ==
Reggina are fierce rivals with neighbours Messina, who are just a twenty-minute ferry ride apart from each other. Twice every season, they clash in the Derby dello Stretto (Strait of Messina Derby). In the 2014–15 season, Reggina defeated Messina in both legs of the playout to send Messina down to Serie D. There is also a major Calabrian derby between Reggina and Crotone, but both teams have not played in the same league in for two years. Reggina also has a derby with fellow Calabrian team Catanzaro, which is currently in Serie B.

== Colours and badges ==
Reggina used a logo with a letter R and a football on it. Some variant of the logo, had 1986, the year of foundation of Reggina Calcio on it. Due to 2015 bankruptcy, the new owner introduced a new logo as the old design was tied to the old legal person of the club. Due to 2016 renaming, some modification was introduced, which a letter R was re-introduced in the logo. However, the design of the ball on the 2016 logo was different from the historical logo, which the 2016 logo used a leather ball. In 2019, the club reverted to use the historical design of the logo.

== Players ==
=== Current squad ===
As of 30 October 2026

Note: Flags indicate national team as defined under FIFA eligibility rules; some limited exceptions apply. Players may hold more than one non-FIFA nationality.

No.	Pos.	Nation	Player
1	GK	ITA	Antonio Lagonigro
3	DF	ITA	Lorenzo Fazio (on loan from Genoa)
4	MF	ITA	Marco Baldan
5	DF	ITA	Rosario Girasole
6	MF	ITA	Andrea Palmieri
7	MF	ITA	Federico Baggi
8	MF	ITA	Alberto Acquadro
9	FW	ITA	Andrea Magrassi
10	FW	ITA	Michele Guida
11	FW	BRA	Matheus Reis
12	GK	ITA	Lorenzo Madia (on loan from Catanzaro)
15	DF	ITA	Luca Bruno
16	DF	ITA	Edoardo De Mori (on loan from Novara)
17	MF	ITA	Antonio Porcino

No.	Pos.	Nation	Player
18	MF	FRA	Mady Abonckelet
21	FW	ITA	Giuliano Alma
22	GK	ITA	Lorenzo Piras
23	MF	ITA	Riccardo Rotulo
24	MF	MAR	Mohamed Laaribi
31	DF	ITA	Ernesto Runza (on loan from Ravenna)
38	MF	ITA	Matteo Rossetti
44	MF	ITA	Stefano Specker (on loan from Juventus)
79	DF	ITA	Edoardo Lancini
88	MF	ITA	Simone Franchini
89	FW	ITA	Antonino Pellicanò
96	FW	GAM	Sulayman Jallow (on loan from Vis Pesaro)
97	MF	ITA	Filippo Toscano
99	MF	ITA	Manuel Macrì

=== On loan ===
As of 1 July 2026

Note: Flags indicate national team as defined under FIFA eligibility rules; some limited exceptions apply. Players may hold more than one non-FIFA nationality.

No.	Pos.	Nation	Player

== Club staff ==
Position	Name
Manager	(Italy) Marco Marchionni
Assistant Manager	(Italy) Giuseppe Irrera
Head of Athletic Training	(Italy) Filippo Gatto
Athletic Trainer	(Italy) Nicolò Degiorgi
Technical Assistant and Match Analyst	(Italy) Umberto Fabiano
Goalkeeping Coach	(Italy) Massimo Di Pasquale
Team Doctor	(Italy) Pasquale Favasuli
Physiotherapist	(Italy) Antonio Costa
Physiotherapist	(Italy) Emiliano D’Angelis

== Managerial history ==
Reggina has had many managers and trainers throughout its history; in some seasons, more than one manager was in charge. Here is the chronological list of them from 1928.

- 1928–1929: Zanghi, József Wereb
- 1929–1932: Attilio Buratti
- 1932–1934: Ferenc Plemich
- 1934–1935: András Kuttik
- 1944–1945: Ottavio Misefari
- 1945–1946: Luigi Lessi
- 1946–1947: Luigi Rossetto
- 1947–1948: Luigi Bertolini, Guido Dossena
- 1948–1949: Luigi Rossetto, Giuseppe Peruchetti
- 1949–1950: Giuseppe Peruchetti, Italo Zamberletti
- 1950–1951: Italo Zamberletti, Fulvio Bernardini
- 1951–1953: Pietro Piselli
- 1953–1955: Enzo Dolfin
- 1955–1958: Oronzo Pugliese
- 1958–1959: Attilio Kossovel, Renato Bodini II
- 1959–1960: Domenico Bosi, Cesare Migliorini
- 1960–1961: Arnaldo Sentimenti
- 1961–1962: Arnaldo Sentimenti, Carlo Rigotti
- 1962–1963: Silvio Di Gennaro
- 1963–1964: Leo Zavatti
- 1964–1968: Tommaso Maestrelli
- 1968–1969: Armando Segato
- 1969–1970: Ezio Galbiati
- 1970–1971: Romolo Bizzotto, Piero Persico
- 1971–1972: Egizio Rubino, Maino Neri
- 1972–1973: Guido Mazzetti
- 1973–1974: Giambattista Moschino, Ettore Recagni, Domenico Cataldo, Olmes Neri
- 1974–1976: Carlo Regalia
- 1976–1977: Carlo Facchin
- 1977–1978: Antonio Angelillo, Rosario Sbano
- 1978–1979: Roberto Balestri, Franco Scoglio
- 1979–1981: Adriano Buffoni
- 1981–1982: Gaetano Salvemini
- 1982–1983: Franco Scoglio, Rosario Sbano
- 1983–1984: Claudio Tobia
- 1984–1985: Claudio Tobia, Nicola Chiricallo, Claudio Tobia
- 1985–1986: Giuseppe Caramanno
- 1986–1987: Alberto Bigon
- 1987–1989: Nevio Scala
- 1989–1990: Bruno Bolchi
- 1990–1991: Aldo Cerantola, Francesco Graziani
- 1991–1992: Aldo Cerantola, Giancarlo Ansaloni, Gabriele Geretto
- 1992–1993: Gabriele Geretto, Giancarlo Ansaloni, Enzo Ferrari
- 1993–1994: Enzo Ferrari
- 1994–1995: Giuliano Zoratti
- 1995–1996: Giuliano Zoratti, Franco Gagliardi
- 1996–1997: Adriano Buffoni, Vincenzo Guerini
- 1997–1998: Franco Colomba
- 1998–1999: Elio Gustinetti, Bruno Bolchi
- 1999–2002: Franco Colomba
- 2002–2003: Bortolo Mutti, Luigi De Canio
- 2003–2004: Franco Colomba, Giancarlo Camolese
- 2004–2007: Walter Mazzarri
- 2007–2008: Massimo Ficcadenti, Renzo Ulivieri, Nevio Orlandi
- 2008–2009: Nevio Orlandi, Giuseppe Pillon, Nevio Orlandi
- 2009–2010: Walter Novellino, Ivo Iaconi, Roberto Breda
- 2010–2011: Gianluca Atzori
- 2011–2012: Roberto Breda, Angelo Gregucci, Roberto Breda
- 2012–2013: Davide Dionigi, Giuseppe Pillon
- 2013–2014: Gianluca Atzori, Fabrizio Castori, Gianluca Atzori, Franco Gagliardi/Diego Zanin
- 2014–2015: Francesco Cozza, Pierantonio Tortelli/Giuseppe Padovano, Roberto Alberti, Giacomo Tedesco
- 2015–2016: Francesco Cozza
- 2016–2017: Karel Zeman
- 2017–2018: Agenore Maurizi
- 2018–2019: Roberto Cevoli
- 2019: Massimo Drago
- 2019: Roberto Cevoli
- 2019–2020: Domenico Toscano
- 2020–2021: Marco Baroni
- 2021: Alfredo Aglietti
- 2021–2022: Domenico Toscano
- 2022-2022: Roberto Stellone
- 2022-2023: Filippo Inzaghi
- 2023-2024: Bruno Trocini
- 2024: Rosario Pergolizzi
- 2024-2025: Bruno Trocini
- 2025-2026: Alfio Torrisi
- 2026- Marco Marchionni

== Kit manufacturer & sponsors ==
=== Kit manufacturer ===
- 1981–1987: NR
- 1987-1991: Adidas
- 1991–1995: Devis
- 1995–2005: ASICS
- 2005–2011: Onze
- 2011–2013: Givova
- 2013–2014: Lotto
- 2014–2015: Legea
- 2015–2017: Onze
- 2017-2020: Legea
- 2020-2022: Macron
- 2023-....: Givova

=== Sponsors ===
- 1982–1983: Peugeot-Talbot Bi.effe.di
- 1983–1984: Kalabria
- 1984–1985: JONICAGRUMI
- 1986–1987: A & O Discount
- 1987–1988: Mangiatorella Acqua
- 1988–1989: Balocco Dolciumi
- 1990–1993: Gis Gelati
- 1993–1994: Eurokeller Caldaie
- 1994–1995: A & O Supermercati
- 1995–2003: Mauro Caffè
- 2003–2004: Spi/ Stocco & Stocco/ Credit Suisse/ FamilyMart
- 2004–2006: Gicos/ Stocco & Stocco
- 2006–2009: Gicos/ Regione Calabria
- 2009–2010: Stocco & Stocco/ Guglielmo Caffe/ Ipac/ La Gru
- 2010–2011: Provincia Di Reggio Calabria/ Stocco & Stocco/ La Fabrica Dello Sport/ Zappala/ Canale/ Mobylia Design/ Progetto5/ Goalsbet Italia/ La Gru
- 2011–2012: Impresa Canale/ Goalsbet Italia/ Diano/ La Gru/ Stocco & Stocco/ Progetto5
- 2012–2013: Stocco & Stocco
- 2013–2014: Ciao Telecom
- 2014–2015: Canale Costruzioni
- 2015–2016: La Saline Resort
- 2016-2017: Ecoenergy/ Polimeno Pietro srl/ Apollo/ Clichè/ Generali assicurazioni
- 2017-2018: Patea; Volkswagen Bencivenni Group/ Puliservice/ Sudauto/ hotel
