= 2017–18 Serie B =

Italian football league season

Serie B
- Season: 2017–18
- Champions: Empoli (2nd title)
- Promoted: Empoli; Parma; Frosinone (by play-off)
- Relegated: Virtus Entella; Novara; Pro Vercelli; Ternana; Bari (bankruptcy); Cesena (bankruptcy); Avellino (bankruptcy)
- Matches: 462
- Goals: 1,182 (2.56 per match)
- Top goalscorer: Francesco Caputo (26 goals)
- Biggest home win: Perugia 5–0 Carpi (18 November 2017)
- Biggest away win: Virtus Entella 1–5 Perugia (27 August 2017); Perugia 1–5 Pro Vercelli (8 October 2017); Bari 0-4 Empoli (27 January 2018); Cremonese 0-4 Foggia (7 April 2018)
- Highest scoring: Empoli 5–3 Cesena (18 November 2017)
- Longest winning run: 6 games Empoli
- Longest unbeaten run: 28 games Empoli
- Longest winless run: 18 games Cremonese
- Longest losing run: 5 games Perugia; Ternana
- Highest attendance: 33,567; Bari 1–0 Foggia (26 November 2017)
- Lowest attendance: 912; Frosinone 2–1 Cittadella (4 September 2017) (Match played in Avellino)
- Total attendance: 3,194,526
- Average attendance: 6,930

The 2017–18 Serie B (known as the Serie B ConTe.it for sponsorship reasons) was the 86th season since its establishment in 1929.

A total of 22 teams contested the league: 15 returning from the 2016–17 Serie B season, 4 promoted from 2016–17 Lega Pro (Cremonese, Venezia, Foggia, Parma), and 3 relegated from 2016–17 Serie A (Empoli, Palermo, Pescara).

== Teams ==
=== Stadia and locations ===
Location of teams in 2017–18 Serie B

Team	Home city	Stadium	Capacity	2016–17 season
Ascoli	Ascoli Piceno	Stadio Cino e Lillo Del Duca	10,887	15th in Serie B
Avellino	Avellino	Stadio Partenio	10,215	17th in Serie B
Bari	Bari	Stadio San Nicola	58,270	12th in Serie B
Brescia	Brescia	Stadio Mario Rigamonti	16,743	14th in Serie B
Carpi	Carpi	Stadio Sandro Cabassi	5,510	7th in Serie B
Cesena	Cesena	Stadio Dino Manuzzi	23,860	13th in Serie B
Cittadella	Cittadella	Stadio Pier Cesare Tombolato	7,623	6th in Serie B
Cremonese	Cremona	Stadio Giovanni Zini	20,641	Lega Pro/A Champions
Empoli	Empoli	Stadio Carlo Castellani	16,800	18th in Serie A
Foggia	Foggia	Stadio Pino Zaccheria	16,798	Lega Pro/C Champions
Frosinone	Frosinone	Stadio Benito Stirpe	16,125	3rd in Serie B
Novara	Novara	Stadio Silvio Piola	17,875	9th in Serie B
Palermo	Palermo	Stadio Renzo Barbera	36,349	19th in Serie A
Parma	Parma	Stadio Ennio Tardini	27,906	2nd in Lega Pro/B
Perugia	Perugia	Stadio Renato Curi	23,125	4th in Serie B
Pescara	Pescara	Stadio Adriatico	20,515	20th in Serie A
Pro Vercelli	Vercelli	Stadio Silvio Piola	5,500	16th in Serie B
Salernitana	Salerno	Stadio Arechi	31,300	11th in Serie B
Spezia	La Spezia	Stadio Alberto Picco	10,290	8th in Serie B
Ternana	Terni	Stadio Libero Liberati	17,460	18th in Serie B
Venezia	Venice	Stadio Pier Luigi Penzo	7,450	Lega Pro/B Champions
Virtus Entella	Chiavari	Stadio Comunale	5,535	10th in Serie B

=== Personnel and kits ===
Team	President	Manager	Kit manufacturer	Shirt sponsor (front)	Shirt sponsor (back)	Shorts sponsor
Ascoli	(Canada) Francesco Bellini	(Italy) Serse Cosmi	Nike	CIAM/Fainplast	Brosway	None
Avellino	(Italy) Walter Taccone	(Italy) Claudio Foscarini	Givova	Sidigas	None	None
Bari	(Italy) Cosmo Antonio Giancaspro	(Italy) Fabio Grosso	Zeus	Peroni 3.5, Piné Cembra	Password/Primiceri SpA	None
Brescia	(Italy) Alessandro Triboldi	(Italy) Ivo Pulga	Acerbis	UBI Banca	OMR	None
Carpi	(Italy) Claudio Caliumi	(Italy) Antonio Calabro	Givova	Gaudì Jeans	Braglia Costruzioni	None
Cesena	(Italy) Giorgio Lugaresi	(Italy) Fabrizio Castori	Lotto	PLT Puregreen	None	None
Cittadella	(Italy) Andrea Gabrielli	(Italy) Roberto Venturato	Boxeur Des Rues	OCSA, Gruppo Gabrielli	Metalservice	Veneta Nastri
Cremonese	(Italy) Luigi Simoni	(Italy) Andrea Mandorlini	Garman	Ilta Inox (H)/Arinox (A), Università di Pavia	None	None
Empoli	(Italy) Fabrizio Corsi	(Italy) Aurelio Andreazzoli	Joma	Gensan, Sammontana (H)/Logli Massimo (A)	Giletti	PSB Advisory
Foggia	(Italy) Lucio Fares	(Italy) Giovanni Stroppa	Nike	Pasta Tamma, Wüber	Metaurobus	Valvoline
Frosinone	(Italy) Maurizio Stirpe	(Italy) Moreno Longo	Legea	Banca Popolare del Frusinate, MBI Gas & Luce	7Sette Carburanti	Acqua Filette
Novara	(Italy) Carlo Accornero	(Italy) Domenico Di Carlo	Joma	Banca Popolare di Novara, Gruppo Comoli Ferrari	Gorgonzola Igor	Intesa pour Homme
Palermo	(Italy) Maurizio Zamparini	(Italy) Roberto Stellone	Legea	Sicily by Car	Bisaten	None
Parma	(China) Jiang Lizhang	(Italy) Roberto D'Aversa	Erreà	Cetilar, Aon	Viva la Mamma Beretta	Colser
Perugia	(Italy) Massimiliano Santopadre	(Italy) Roberto Breda	Frankie Garage	Officine Piccini, Fortinfissi	Tedesco Group	Mericat
Pescara	(Italy) Daniele Sebastiani	(Italy) Giuseppe Pillon	Erreà	Saquella Caffè, Lilofilchem	Sarni Ristorazione (H)/Sarnioro (A)	Vincenzo Serraiocco Consulting
Pro Vercelli	(Italy) Massimo Secondo	(Italy) Gianluca Grassadonia	Erreà	PGO Group (H)/MediatechShop (A)	None	None
Salernitana	(Italy) Marco Mezzaroma & Claudio Lotito	(Italy) Stefano Colantuono	Givova	Sèleco Home	Sèleco Easy Life	None
Spezia	(Italy) Andrea Corradino	(Italy) Fabio Gallo	Acerbis	Arquati, Carispezia	None	Gelateria Vernazza
Ternana	(Italy) Stefano Bandecchi	(Italy) Luigi De Canio	Zeus	Unicusano	None	None
Venezia	(United States) Joe Tacopina	(Italy) Filippo Inzaghi	Nike	Lino Sonego	None	Estra
Virtus Entella	(Italy) Antonio Gozzi	(Italy) Alfredo Aglietti	Acerbis	Duferco Energia	Pensa Benessere	None

=== Managerial changes ===
Team	Outgoing manager	Manner of departure	Date of vacancy	Position in table	Replaced by	Date of appointment
Ascoli	(Italy) Alfredo Aglietti	End of contract	1 June 2017	Pre-season	(Italy) Fulvio Fiorin & (Italy) Enzo Maresca	1 June 2017
Bari	(Italy) Stefano Colantuono	End of contract	13 June 2017	Pre-season	(Italy) Fabio Grosso	13 June 2017
Brescia	(Italy) Luigi Cagni	End of contract	3 June 2017	Pre-season	(Italy) Roberto Boscaglia	3 June 2017
Carpi	(Italy) Fabrizio Castori	Mutual consent	12 June 2017	Pre-season	(Italy) Antonio Calabro	14 July 2017
Frosinone	(Italy) Pasquale Marino	Mutual consent	14 June 2017	Pre-season	(Italy) Moreno Longo	14 June 2017
Novara	(Italy) Roberto Boscaglia	Signed by Brescia	3 June 2017	Pre-season	(Italy) Eugenio Corini	14 June 2017
Pro Vercelli	(Italy) Moreno Longo	Signed by Frosinone	14 June 2017	Pre-season	(Italy) Gianluca Grassadonia	14 June 2017
Spezia	(Italy) Domenico Di Carlo	End of contract	14 June 2017	Pre-season	(Italy) Fabio Gallo	14 June 2017
Perugia	(Italy) Cristian Bucchi	Signed by Sassuolo	20 June 2017	Pre-season	(Italy) Federico Giunti	23 June 2017
Empoli	(Italy) Giovanni Martusciello	Mutual consent	20 June 2017	Pre-season	(Italy) Vincenzo Vivarini	21 June 2017
Palermo	(Italy) Diego Bortoluzzi	End of contract	21 June 2017	Pre-season	(Italy) Bruno Tedino	22 June 2017
Ternana	(Italy) Fabio Liverani	End of contract	30 June 2017	Pre-season	(Italy) Sandro Pochesci	9 July 2017
Cesena	(Italy) Andrea Camplone	Sacked	30 September 2017	22nd	(Italy) Fabrizio Castori	1 October 2017
Brescia	(Italy) Roberto Boscaglia	Sacked	12 October 2017	15th	(Italy) Pasquale Marino	12 October 2017
Perugia	(Italy) Federico Giunti	Sacked	24 October 2017	15th	(Italy) Roberto Breda	26 October 2017
V. Entella	(Italy) Gianpaolo Castorina	Sacked	5 November 2017	19th	(Italy) Alfredo Aglietti	6 November 2017
Ascoli	(Italy) Fulvio Fiorin	Sacked	7 December 2017	22nd	(Italy) Serse Cosmi	7 December 2017
Salernitana	(Italy) Alberto Bollini	Sacked	11 December 2017	11th	(Italy) Stefano Colantuono	12 December 2017
Empoli	(Italy) Vincenzo Vivarini	Sacked	16 December 2017	5th	(Italy) Aurelio Andreazzoli	17 December 2017
Pro Vercelli	(Italy) Gianluca Grassadonia	Sacked	16 December 2017	20th	(Italy) Gianluca Atzori	17 December 2017
Brescia	(Italy) Pasquale Marino	Sacked	15 January 2018	17th	(Italy) Roberto Boscaglia	15 January 2018
Pro Vercelli	(Italy) Gianluca Atzori	Sacked	22 January 2018	22nd	(Italy) Gianluca Grassadonia	22 January 2018
Ternana	(Italy) Sandro Pochesci	Sacked	29 January 2018	20th	(Italy) Ferruccio Mariani	30 January 2018
Novara	(Italy) Eugenio Corini	Sacked	4 February 2018	16th	(Italy) Domenico Di Carlo	5 February 2018
Ternana	(Italy) Ferruccio Mariani	Sacked	21 February 2018	22nd	(Italy) Luigi De Canio	21 February 2018
Pescara	(Czech Republic) Zdeněk Zeman	Sacked	6 March 2018	13th	(Italy) Massimo Epifani	6 March 2018
Pescara	(Italy) Massimo Epifani	Sacked	1 April 2018	16th	(Italy) Giuseppe Pillon	1 April 2018
Avellino	(Italy) Walter Novellino	Sacked	3 April 2018	18th	(Italy) Claudio Foscarini	3 April 2018
Cremonese	(Italy) Attilio Tesser	Sacked	23 April 2018	14th	(Italy) Andrea Mandorlini	23 April 2018
Palermo	(Italy) Bruno Tedino	Sacked	28 April 2018	3rd	(Italy) Roberto Stellone	28 April 2018
Brescia	(Italy) Roberto Boscaglia	Sacked	29 April 2018	13th	(Italy) Ivo Pulga	29 April 2018
Virtus Entella	(Italy) Alfredo Aglietti	Sacked	6 May 2018	20th	(Italy) Gennaro Volpe	6 May 2018
Pro Vercelli	(Italy) Gianluca Grassadonia	Sacked	7 May 2018	22nd	(Italy) Vito Grieco	7 May 2018

== League table ==
Pos	Team	Pld	W	D	L	GF	GA	GD	Pts	Promotion, qualification or relegation
1	Empoli (C, P)	42	24	13	5	88	49	+39	85	Promotion to Serie A
2	Parma (P)	42	21	9	12	57	37	+20	72 (Note: Parma is ahead of Frosinone on head-to-head goal difference: Parma 2–0 Frosinone, Frosinone 2–1 Parma.)	Promotion to Serie A
3	Frosinone (O, P)	42	19	15	8	65	47	+18	72	Qualification to promotion play-offs semi-finals
4	Palermo	42	18	17	7	59	39	+20	71	Qualification to promotion play-offs semi-finals
5	Venezia	42	17	16	9	56	42	+14	67	Qualification to promotion play-offs preliminary round
6	Cittadella	42	18	12	12	61	48	+13	66	Qualification to promotion play-offs preliminary round
7	Bari (Note: Bari was deducted two points for administrative irregularities. The team was reestablished in 2018 after the bankruptcy of the previous legal person) (R, D, R)	42	18	13	11	59	48	+11	65	Relegation to Serie D (Note: Bari, Cesena and Avellino were excluded from the league after the season for financial issues.)
8	Perugia	42	16	12	14	67	58	+9	60	Qualification to promotion play-offs preliminary round
9	Foggia	42	16	10	16	66	68	−2	58	
10	Spezia	42	13	14	15	46	45	+1	53	
11	Carpi	42	12	16	14	32	46	−14	52	
12	Salernitana	42	11	18	13	51	58	−7	51	
13	Cesena (Note: A.C. Cesena bankrupted in mid-2018. A.S.D. Romagna Centro Cesena; another team from Cesena was renamed to Cesena F.C. which would participate in 2018–19 Serie D) (E, R)	42	11	17	14	55	61	−6	50	Relegation to Serie D
14	Cremonese	42	9	21	12	48	47	+1	48 (Note: Head-to-head points: Cremonese 10 pts, Avellino 8 pts, Brescia 7 pts, Pescara 6 pts.)	
15	Avellino (R, E, R, R)	42	11	15	16	49	60	−11	48	Relegation to Serie D
16	Brescia	42	11	15	16	41	52	−11	48	
17	Pescara	42	11	15	16	50	64	−14	48	
18	Ascoli (O)	42	11	13	18	40	60	−20	46	Qualification to relegation play-out
19	Virtus Entella (R)	42	10	14	18	41	54	−13	44 (Note: Virtus Entella is ahead of Novara on head-to-head points: Virtus Entella 2–1 Novara, Novara 0–1 Virtus Entella.)	Qualification to relegation play-out
20	Novara (R)	42	10	14	18	42	52	−10	44	Relegation to Serie C
21	Pro Vercelli (R)	42	9	13	20	47	70	−23	40	Relegation to Serie C
22	Ternana (R)	42	7	16	19	62	77	−15	37	Relegation to Serie C

Source: Lega Serie B
Rules for classification: 1) Points; 2) Head-to-head points; 3) Head-to-head goal difference; 4) Goal difference; 5) Goals scored; 6) Draw.
(C) Champions; (D) Disqualified; (E) Eliminated; (O) Play-off winners; (P) Promoted; (R) Relegated
Notes:

On August 13, 2018, the FIGC decided to reduce the chronic financial instability of the league halting re-elections of clubs. Serie B was so reduced to 19 clubs.

== Promotion play-offs ==
Six teams could contest the promotion play-offs depending on the point differential between the third and fourth-placed teams and also third and any team below. It began with a preliminary one-legged round played at the home venue of the higher placed team, involving the teams placed fifth to eight. The two winning (or higher placed team from regular season if a match ended with a draw) teams advanced to play the third and fourth-placed teams in the two-legged semi-finals. Those winning teams advanced to the two-legged final, where the winner was promoted to play in Serie A the following season. In the two-legged rounds, the higher seeded team played the second game at home.

Preliminary round
5	Venezia	3
8	Perugia	0
6	Cittadella	2
7	Bari	2

Semi-finals
5	Venezia	1	0	1
4	Palermo	1	1	2
6	Cittadella	1	1	2
3	Frosinone	1	1	2

Final
4	Palermo	2	0	2
3	Frosinone	1	2	3

== Relegation play-out ==
Two teams contested the relegation play-out in a two-legged round. The higher placed team played the second leg at home. In the case of a tie on aggregate, the higher placed team from the regular season were declared the winners. The losers were relegated to Serie C for the following season.

Team 1	Agg.	Team 2	1st leg	2nd leg
Virtus Entella (19)	0–0	Ascoli (18)	0–0	0–0

== Top goalscorers ==
Rank	Player	Club	Goals
1	(Italy) Francesco Caputo	Empoli	26
2	(Italy) Alfredo Donnarumma	Empoli	23
3	(Italy) Samuel Di Carmine	Perugia	22
4	(Italy) Adriano Montalto	Ternana	20
5	(Italy) Fabio Mazzeo	Foggia	19
6	(Italy) Alberto Cerri	Perugia	15
7	(Italy) Camillo Ciano	Frosinone	14
7	(Italy) Cristian Galano	Bari	14
9	(Italy) Emanuele Calaiò	Parma	13
9	(Italy) Andrea Caracciolo	Brescia	13
9	(Italy) Daniel Ciofani	Frosinone	13
9	(North Macedonia) Ilija Nestorovski	Palermo	13
9	(Italy) Stefano Pettinari	Pescara	13

== Results ==
Home \ Away	ASC	AVE	BAR	BRE	CRP	CES	CIT	CRE	EMP	FOG	FRO	NOV	PAL	PAR	PER	PES	PVE	SAL	SPE	TER	VEN	VET
Ascoli		1–1	1–0	0–0	2–0	2–1	1–2	0–0	1–2	0–2	0–1	1–2	0–0	0–1	2–2	1–1	1–0	1–3	3–1	2–1	3–3	1–1
Avellino	1–1		1–2	2–1	1–1	1–1	0–2	0–0	3–2	5–1	0–2	2–1	1–3	1–2	2–0	2–2	1–0	2–3	1–0	2–1	1–1	0–0
Bari	3–0	2–1		3–0	2–0	3–0	4–2	1–0	0–4	1–0	1–0	1–1	0–3	0–0	3–1	1–0	2–2	1–1	1–1	3–0	0–2	1–0
Brescia	0–1	2–3	2–1		1–1	0–0	1–1	1–1	0–2	2–2	1–2	0–1	0–0	2–1	2–1	2–1	0–0	2–0	1–1	3–1	1–2	0–0
Carpi	4–2	0–0	0–0	1–1		2–1	1–1	1–1	0–0	1–3	1–1	1–0	1–3	2–1	1–2	0–1	2–0	1–0	2–1	2–1	0–0	0–0
Cesena	0–2	3–1	1–1	1–0	0–0		0–1	1–0	2–3	3–3	1–0	2–2	1–1	2–1	1–1	4–2	2–2	3–3	1–0	4–3	0–0	3–0
Cittadella	3–2	2–2	0–0	2–2	0–1	4–0		1–2	1–1	3–1	1–2	1–3	0–0	1–2	1–1	2–0	2–0	2–1	1–2	1–1	2–1	0–1
Cremonese	1–2	3–1	0–1	2–0	1–1	1–0	1–1		1–1	0–4	2–2	1–1	1–2	1–0	3–3	0–0	2–3	1–1	1–0	3–3	5–1	0–1
Empoli	3–0	1–1	3–2	1–1	1–0	5–3	0–1	1–1		3–1	3–3	1–1	4–0	4–0	2–1	3–1	3–2	2–0	1–1	2–1	3–2	2–1
Foggia	3–0	2–1	1–1	1–2	3–0	2–1	1–3	2–3	0–3		1–2	2–2	1–1	0–3	2–1	0–1	2–1	1–0	2–1	1–1	2–2	1–1
Frosinone	2–0	1–1	3–2	2–0	1–0	3–3	2–1	0–0	2–4	2–2		1–0	0–0	2–1	1–3	3–0	4–0	0–0	1–1	4–2	2–1	4–3
Novara	1–2	1–2	1–2	2–1	1–0	1–0	1–0	1–1	1–1	0–1	2–1		2–2	0–1	1–1	1–1	0–1	2–3	1–1	0–3	1–3	0–1
Palermo	4–1	3–0	1–1	2–0	4–0	0–0	0–3	1–1	3–3	1–2	1–0	0–2		1–1	1–0	1–1	2–1	3–0	2–0	1–0	0–0	2–0
Parma	4–0	2–0	1–0	0–1	2–1	0–0	0–0	1–0	1–2	3–1	2–0	3–0	3–2		1–1	0–1	3–0	2–2	0–0	2–0	1–1	3–1
Perugia	1–0	1–1	1–3	2–0	5–0	0–3	1–3	1–0	2–4	2–0	1–0	1–1	1–0	3–0		4–2	1–5	1–1	3–0	2–3	1–1	2–0
Pescara	0–1	2–1	2–2	0–3	0–1	0–0	1–2	0–0	0–1	5–1	3–3	1–0	2–2	1–4	0–2		3–1	1–0	3–2	3–3	1–0	2–2
Pro Vercelli	2–0	0–0	2–2	0–0	0–0	5–2	1–2	1–4	2–1	1–4	0–2	0–0	0–0	1–0	0–2	3–1		1–1	0–2	2–1	0–2	1–1
Salernitana	0–0	2–0	2–2	4–2	1–2	1–1	1–3	1–1	2–1	0–3	1–1	1–0	0–2	0–1	1–1	2–2	0–0		2–0	3–3	3–2	1–0
Spezia	1–1	1–0	1–0	0–1	0–1	1–2	0–0	1–0	1–1	1–0	1–1	1–0	0–0	0–2	4–2	4–0	5–1	3–0		1–1	1–1	2–1
Ternana	1–1	1–2	1–2	1–1	0–0	1–0	5–1	2–1	1–1	2–2	0–0	1–1	2–3	1–1	1–1	0–3	4–3	2–2	4–2		2–3	0–1
Venezia	1–0	3–1	3–1	1–2	2–0	1–0	2–1	1–1	1–0	2–1	1–1	1–3	3–0	0–1	1–0	0–0	1–1	0–0	0–0	2–0		2–0
Virtus Entella	1–1	1–1	3–1	3–0	0–0	2–2	0–1	1–1	2–3	1–2	0–1	2–1	1–2	2–0	1–5	0–0	3–2	0–2	0–1	3–1	0–0	

Source: Eurosport.com (Italian)
Legend: Blue = home team win; Yellow = draw; Red = away team win.

== Attendances ==
No.	Club	Average	Highest
1	Bari	15,800	33,567
2	Cesena	12,106	16,234
3	Parma	11,385	14,820
4	Foggia	10,533	14,343
5	Frosinone	10,299	16,286
6	Palermo	9,029	23,207
7	Salernitana	8,721	16,813
8	Perugia	8,670	13,696
9	Pescara	7,571	12,672
10	Cremonese	7,206	10,958
11	Brescia	6,863	8,670
12	Spezia	5,639	8,270
13	Ascoli	5,371	8,764
14	Empoli	4,914	9,132
15	Ternana	4,769	9,509
16	Avellino	4,421	10,000
17	Venezia	4,199	5,944
18	Novara	4,044	5,735
19	Cittadella	3,537	5,099
20	Pro Vercelli	2,754	4,446
21	Carpi	2,181	3,487
22	Virtus Entella	2,109	3,589
