= 2019–20 Serie A =

118th season of top-tier Italian football

Serie A
- Season: 2019–20
- Dates: 24 August 2019 – 2 August 2020
- Champions: Juventus; 36th title
- Relegated: Lecce; Brescia; SPAL
- Champions League: Juventus; Internazionale; Atalanta; Lazio
- Europa League: Napoli; Roma; Milan
- Matches: 380
- Goals: 1,154 (3.04 per match)
- Top goalscorer: Ciro Immobile (36 goals)
- Biggest home win: Atalanta 7–1 Udinese (27 October 2019); Internazionale 6–0 Brescia (1 July 2020)
- Biggest away win: Torino 0–7 Atalanta (25 January 2020)
- Highest scoring: Lecce 2–7 Atalanta (1 March 2020)
- Longest winning run: Lazio (11 matches)
- Longest unbeaten run: Lazio (21 matches)
- Longest winless run: Brescia (14 matches)
- Longest losing run: Brescia; Lecce; SPAL; Torino (6 matches)
- Highest attendance: 75,923; Internazionale 1–2 Juventus (6 October 2019)
- Lowest attendance: 8,182; Atalanta 2–3 Torino (1 September 2019) (Note: Match played in Parma.) (Note: Starting 8 March 2020, due to the COVID-19 pandemic in Italy, all matches were played behind closed doors.)
- Total attendance: 6,610,983
- Average attendance: 27,205

The 2019–20 Serie A (known as the Serie A TIM for sponsorship reasons) was the 118th season of top-tier Italian football, the 88th in a round-robin tournament, and the 10th since its organization under an own league committee, the Lega Serie A. Juventus, the eight-time defending champions, secured their ninth consecutive Serie A title with a 2–1 victory over Sampdoria on 16 July 2020.

The season was originally scheduled to run from 24 August 2019 to 24 May 2020. On 9 March 2020, the government suspended all sports in the country until 3 April 2020 due to the COVID-19 pandemic in Italy. The Serie A did not resume on this date however, as the league continued to monitor health conditions. On 18 May, the Italian Football Federation announced that the suspension would continue until 14 June. Ten days later, on 28 May, Italy's sports minister said Serie A would restart on 20 June 2020.

== Events ==
On 14 April 2019, Chievo returned to Serie B after 11 years. Following this on 5 May Frosinone was relegated after one year while the last team to be relegated was Empoli (on 26 May 2019) also after just one year.

Teams that were promoted directly from 2018–19 Serie B were Brescia (on 1 May 2019, after 8 years of absence) and Lecce (10 days later, after 7 years) while the last team to join was Hellas Verona (after just one season in Serie B) by winning the promotion play-off on 2 June.

On 28 June 2019, Milan were excluded from the Europa League after breaches of the UEFA Financial Fair Play Regulations. Roma were then moved to the Europa League group phase while Torino entered the preliminary round.

=== Impact of the COVID-19 pandemic on Serie A ===
On 22 February 2020, Prime Minister of Italy, Giuseppe Conte, suspended all sporting events in the regions of Lombardy and Veneto, which included three Serie A matches in those regions, as well as one in Piedmont, that were to be played the following day, due to the COVID-19 pandemic in the country. The following week, six matches were initially to be played behind closed doors due to scare of the outbreak, however, all were later outright suspended. On 4 March, the government ruled that all sporting events in Italy would be played behind closed doors until 3 April. On 9 March, the government ruled that all sporting events in Italy be suspended until 3 April. Serie A did not resume play on this date, citing it will only resume once "health conditions allow it". Even there was considered the option of cancelling the championship. On 13 May, it was announced that team training would be resumed on 18 May, and on 18 May it was announced that Italian football would be suspended until 14 June. On 28 May, Italian Minister for Sport Vincenzo Spadafora announced that Serie A would resume starting 20 June. Protocol was established wherein the entire squad would be quarantined for 14 days if one member, player or staff, tests positive for COVID-19. On 18 June, Spadafora approved the softening of quarantine rules which allowed for the quarantining of only the individual who tests positive for COVID-19, whereas the rest of the squad will ramp up testing, including a rapid-response test the day before a match.

== Teams ==
=== Team changes ===
Promoted from 2018–19 Serie B	Relegated from 2018–19 Serie A
Brescia	Empoli
Lecce	Frosinone
Hellas Verona	Chievo Verona

=== Stadiums and locations ===
Locations of the 2019–20 Serie A teams

Team	Home city	Stadium	Capacity
Atalanta	Bergamo	Stadio Atleti Azzurri d'Italia	21,300
Bologna	Bologna	Stadio Renato Dall'Ara	38,279
Brescia	Brescia	Stadio Mario Rigamonti	19,500
Cagliari	Cagliari	Sardegna Arena	16,233
Fiorentina	Florence	Stadio Artemio Franchi	43,147
Genoa	Genoa	Stadio Luigi Ferraris	36,600
Hellas Verona	Verona	Stadio Marc'Antonio Bentegodi	39,211
Internazionale	Milan	San Siro	75,923
Juventus	Turin	Juventus Stadium	41,507
Lazio	Rome	Stadio Olimpico	70,634
Lecce	Lecce	Stadio Via del Mare	31,533
Milan	Milan	San Siro	75,923
Napoli	Naples	Stadio San Paolo	54,726
Parma	Parma	Stadio Ennio Tardini	27,906
Roma	Rome	Stadio Olimpico	70,634
Sampdoria	Genoa	Stadio Luigi Ferraris	36,685
Sassuolo	Sassuolo	Mapei Stadium – Città del Tricolore (Reggio Emilia)	21,584
SPAL	Ferrara	Stadio Paolo Mazza	16,134
Torino	Turin	Stadio Olimpico Grande Torino	27,958
Udinese	Udine	Stadio Friuli	25,144

=== Personnel and kits ===
Team	Head coach	Captain	Kit manufacturer	Shirt sponsor(s)	
Team	Head coach	Captain	Kit manufacturer	Main	Other
Atalanta	(Italy) Gian Piero Gasperini	(Argentina) Alejandro Gómez	Joma	Radici Group	Front: U-Power; Back: Gewiss; Sleeves: Automha
Bologna	(Serbia) Siniša Mihajlović	(Italy) Andrea Poli	Macron	Liu·Jo	Back: Illumia; Sleeves: Lavoropiù
Brescia	(Uruguay) Diego López	(Italy) Daniele Gastaldello	Kappa	UBI Banca	Back: Officine Meccaniche Rezzatesi
Cagliari	(Italy) Walter Zenga	(Italy) Luca Ceppitelli	Macron	ISOLA Artigianato di Sardegna	Front: Ichnusa; Back: Nieddittas; Sleeves: Latte Arborea
Fiorentina	(Italy) Giuseppe Iachini	(Argentina) Germán Pezzella	Le Coq Sportif	Mediacom	Front: Val di Fassa/Meyer Children's Hospital; Back: Prima.it; Sleeves: Estra
Genoa	(Italy) Davide Nicola	(Italy) Domenico Criscito	Kappa	Zentiva	Back: Leaseplan
Hellas Verona	(Croatia) Ivan Jurić	(Italy) Giampaolo Pazzini	Macron	Gruppo Sinergy	Front: Air Dolomiti (H & A)/Sartori Vini (T); Back: ABEO Onlus/Busajo Onlus/Tescoma/Manila Grace/Garelli/Winelivery/Bergen Srl/Olimpiadi del Cuore Onlus/Sundek; Sleeves: Mercedes-Benz Trivellato Industriali
Internazionale	(Italy) Antonio Conte	(Slovenia) Samir Handanović	Nike	Pirelli	Back: Driver
Juventus	(Italy) Maurizio Sarri	(Italy) Giorgio Chiellini	Adidas	Jeep	Back: Cygames
Lazio	(Italy) Simone Inzaghi	(Bosnia and Herzegovina) Senad Lulić	Macron	None	Sleeves: Frecciarossa/Clinica Paideia
Lecce	(Italy) Fabio Liverani	(Italy) Marco Mancosu	M908	Moby Lines	Front: Pasta Maffei; Back: LaBconsulenze; Sleeves: Banca Popolare Pugliese
Milan	(Italy) Stefano Pioli	(Italy) Alessio Romagnoli	Puma	Fly Emirates	None
Napoli	(Italy) Gennaro Gattuso	(Italy) Lorenzo Insigne	Kappa	Lete	Front: MSC Cruises; Back: Kimbo Caffè
Parma	(Italy) Roberto D'Aversa	(Portugal) Bruno Alves	Erreà	Cetilar	Front: Lewer; Back: Viva la Mamma Beretta; Sleeves: Canovi Coperture
Roma	(Portugal) Paulo Fonseca	(Bosnia and Herzegovina) Edin Džeko	Nike	Qatar Airways	Back: Hyundai
Sampdoria	(Italy) Claudio Ranieri	(Italy) Fabio Quagliarella	Joma	Invent Energy/Acqua S. Bernardo	Back: IBSA Group
Sassuolo	(Italy) Roberto De Zerbi	(Italy) Francesco Magnanelli	Kappa	Mapei	None
SPAL	(Italy) Luigi Di Biagio	(Italy) Sergio Floccari	Macron	Omega Group/OrOil/VB Impianti/Orlandi Lubrificanti	Front: Omega Group/Krifi Caffè; Back: Errebi Technology; Sleeves: Pentaferte
Torino	(Italy) Moreno Longo	(Italy) Andrea Belotti	Joma	Suzuki	Front: Fratelli Beretta; Back: Edilizia Acrobatica; Sleeves: N° 38 Wüber
Udinese	(Italy) Luca Gotti	(Italy) Kevin Lasagna	Macron	Dacia	Front: Vortice; Back: Bluenergy

=== Managerial changes ===
Team	Outgoing manager	Manner of departure	Date of vacancy	Position in table	Replaced by	Date of appointment
Roma	(Italy) Claudio Ranieri	End of contract	26 May 2019	Pre-season	(Portugal) Paulo Fonseca	11 June 2019
Juventus	(Italy) Massimiliano Allegri	Sacked	26 May 2019	Pre-season	(Italy) Maurizio Sarri	16 June 2019
Milan	(Italy) Gennaro Gattuso	Sacked	28 May 2019	Pre-season	(Italy) Marco Giampaolo	19 June 2019
Internazionale	(Italy) Luciano Spalletti	Sacked	30 May 2019	Pre-season	(Italy) Antonio Conte	31 May 2019
Sampdoria	(Italy) Marco Giampaolo	Mutual consent, signed for Milan	15 June 2019	Pre-season	(Italy) Eusebio Di Francesco	22 June 2019
Genoa	(Italy) Cesare Prandelli	Mutual consent	20 June 2019	Pre-season	(Italy) Aurelio Andreazzoli	14 June 2019
Hellas Verona	(Italy) Alfredo Aglietti	End of contract	30 June 2019	Pre-season	(Croatia) Ivan Jurić	14 June 2019
Sampdoria	(Italy) Eusebio Di Francesco	Mutual consent	7 October 2019	20th	(Italy) Claudio Ranieri	12 October 2019
Milan	(Italy) Marco Giampaolo	Sacked	8 October 2019	13th	(Italy) Stefano Pioli	9 October 2019
Genoa	(Italy) Aurelio Andreazzoli	Sacked	22 October 2019	19th	(Italy) Thiago Motta	22 October 2019
Udinese	(Croatia) Igor Tudor	Sacked	1 November 2019	14th	(Italy) Luca Gotti	1 November 2019
Brescia	(Italy) Eugenio Corini	Sacked	3 November 2019	18th	(Italy) Fabio Grosso	5 November 2019
Brescia	(Italy) Fabio Grosso	Sacked	2 December 2019	20th	(Italy) Eugenio Corini	2 December 2019
Napoli	(Italy) Carlo Ancelotti	Sacked	10 December 2019	7th	(Italy) Gennaro Gattuso	11 December 2019
Fiorentina	(Italy) Vincenzo Montella	Sacked	21 December 2019	14th	(Italy) Giuseppe Iachini	23 December 2019
Genoa	(Italy) Thiago Motta	Sacked	28 December 2019	20th	(Italy) Davide Nicola	28 December 2019
Torino	(Italy) Walter Mazzarri	Mutual consent	4 February 2020	12th	(Italy) Moreno Longo	4 February 2020
Brescia	(Italy) Eugenio Corini	Sacked	5 February 2020	19th	(Uruguay) Diego López	5 February 2020
SPAL	(Italy) Leonardo Semplici	Sacked	10 February 2020	20th	(Italy) Luigi Di Biagio	10 February 2020
Cagliari	(Italy) Rolando Maran	Sacked	3 March 2020	11th	(Italy) Walter Zenga	3 March 2020

== League table ==
Pos	Team	Pld	W	D	L	GF	GA	GD	Pts	Qualification or relegation
1	Juventus (C)	38	26	5	7	76	43	+33	83	Qualification for the Champions League group stage
2	Internazionale	38	24	10	4	81	36	+45	82	Qualification for the Champions League group stage
3	Atalanta	38	23	9	6	98	48	+50	78 (Note: Atalanta finished ahead of Lazio on head-to-head points: Lazio 3–3 Atalanta, Atalanta 3–2 Lazio.)	Qualification for the Champions League group stage
4	Lazio	38	24	6	8	79	42	+37	78	Qualification for the Champions League group stage
5	Roma	38	21	7	10	77	51	+26	70	Qualification for the Europa League group stage
6	Milan	38	19	9	10	63	46	+17	66	Qualification for the Europa League second qualifying round
7	Napoli	38	18	8	12	61	50	+11	62	Qualification for the Europa League group stage (Note: Napoli qualified for the Europa League group stage by winning the 2019–20 Coppa Italia.)
8	Sassuolo	38	14	9	15	69	63	+6	51	
9	Hellas Verona	38	12	13	13	47	51	−4	49 (Note: Positions determined by head-to-head points: Hellas Verona: 10 pts; Fiorentina: 5 pts; Parma: 1 pt.)	
10	Fiorentina	38	12	13	13	51	48	+3	49	
11	Parma	38	14	7	17	56	57	−1	49	
12	Bologna	38	12	11	15	52	65	−13	47	
13	Udinese	38	12	9	17	37	51	−14	45 (Note: Udinese finished ahead of Cagliari on head-to-head points: Udinese 2–1 Cagliari, Cagliari 0–1 Udinese.)	
14	Cagliari	38	11	12	15	52	56	−4	45	
15	Sampdoria	38	12	6	20	48	65	−17	42	
16	Torino	38	11	7	20	46	68	−22	40	
17	Genoa	38	10	9	19	47	73	−26	39	
18	Lecce (R)	38	9	8	21	52	85	−33	35	Relegation to Serie B
19	Brescia (R)	38	6	7	25	35	79	−44	25	Relegation to Serie B
20	SPAL (R)	38	5	5	28	27	77	−50	20	Relegation to Serie B

Source: Serie A, Soccerway
Rules for classification: 1) Points; 2) Head-to-head points; 3) Head-to-head goal difference; 4) Goal difference; 5) Goals scored; 6) Draw. (Note: Head-to-head record is used only after all the matches between the teams in question have been played)
(C) Champions; (R) Relegated

== Results ==
Home \ Away	ATA	BOL	BRE	CAG	FIO	GEN	HEL	INT	JUV	LAZ	LEC	MIL	NAP	PAR	ROM	SAM	SAS	SPA	TOR	UDI
Atalanta	—	1–0	6–2	0–2	2–2	2–2	3–2	0–2	1–3	3–2	3–1	5–0	2–0	5–0	2–1	2–0	4–1	1–2	2–3	7–1
Bologna	2–1	—	2–1	1–1	1–1	0–3	1–1	1–2	0–2	2–2	3–2	2–3	1–1	2–2	1–2	2–1	1–2	1–0	1–1	1–1
Brescia	0–3	3–4	—	2–2	0–0	2–2	2–0	1–2	1–2	1–2	3–0	0–1	1–2	1–2	0–3	1–1	0–2	2–1	0–4	1–1
Cagliari	0–1	3–2	0–1	—	5–2	3–1	1–1	1–2	2–0	1–2	0–0	0–2	0–1	2–2	3–4	4–3	1–1	2–0	4–2	0–1
Fiorentina	1–2	4–0	1–1	0–0	—	0–0	1–1	1–1	0–0	1–2	0–1	1–1	3–4	1–1	1–4	2–1	1–3	1–0	2–0	1–0
Genoa	1–2	0–0	3–1	1–0	2–1	—	3–0	0–3	1–3	2–3	2–1	1–2	1–2	1–4	1–3	0–1	2–1	2–0	0–1	1–3
Hellas Verona	1–1	1–1	2–1	2–1	1–0	2–1	—	2–2	2–1	1–5	3–0	0–1	0–2	3–2	1–3	2–0	0–1	3–0	3–3	0–0
Internazionale	1–1	1–2	6–0	1–1	0–0	4–0	2–1	—	1–2	1–0	4–0	4–2	2–0	2–2	0–0	2–1	3–3	2–1	3–1	1–0
Juventus	2–2	2–1	2–0	4–0	3–0	2–1	2–1	2–0	—	2–1	4–0	1–0	4–3	2–1	1–3	2–0	2–2	2–0	4–1	3–1
Lazio	3–3	2–0	2–0	2–1	2–1	4–0	0–0	2–1	3–1	—	4–2	0–3	1–0	2–0	1–1	5–1	1–2	5–1	4–0	3–0
Lecce	2–7	2–3	3–1	2–2	1–3	2–2	0–1	1–1	1–1	2–1	—	1–4	1–4	3–4	0–1	1–2	2–2	2–1	4–0	0–1
Milan	1–1	5–1	1–0	3–0	1–3	1–2	1–1	0–2	4–2	1–2	2–2	—	1–1	3–1	2–0	0–0	0–0	1–0	1–0	3–2
Napoli	2–2	1–2	2–1	0–1	0–2	0–0	2–0	1–3	2–1	3–1	2–3	2–2	—	1–2	2–1	2–0	2–0	3–1	2–1	2–1
Parma	1–2	2–2	1–1	1–3	1–2	5–1	0–1	1–2	0–1	0–1	2–0	0–1	2–1	—	2–0	2–3	1–0	0–1	3–2	2–0
Roma	0–2	2–3	3–0	1–1	2–1	3–3	2–1	2–2	1–2	1–1	4–0	2–1	2–1	2–1	—	2–1	4–2	3–1	0–2	0–2
Sampdoria	0–0	1–2	5–1	3–0	1–5	1–2	2–1	1–3	1–2	0–3	1–1	1–4	2–4	0–1	0–0	—	0–0	3–0	1–0	2–1
Sassuolo	1–4	3–1	3–0	2–2	1–2	5–0	3–3	3–4	3–3	1–2	4–2	1–2	1–2	0–1	4–2	4–1	—	3–0	2–1	0–1
SPAL	2–3	1–3	0–1	0–1	1–3	1–1	0–2	0–4	1–2	2–1	1–3	2–2	1–1	1–0	1–6	0–1	1–2	—	1–1	0–3
Torino	0–7	1–0	3–1	1–1	2–1	3–0	1–1	0–3	0–1	1–2	1–2	2–1	0–0	1–1	2–3	1–3	2–1	1–2	—	1–0
Udinese	2–3	1–0	0–1	2–1	0–0	2–2	0–0	0–2	2–1	0–0	1–2	1–0	1–1	1–3	0–4	1–3	3–0	0–0	1–0	—

Source: Serie A
Legend: Blue = home team win; Yellow = draw; Red = away team win.
For upcoming matches, an "a" indicates there is an article about the rivalry between the two participants.

== Players' awards ==
=== Most valuable player of the Month ===
Month	Player	Club	Ref.
September	(France) Franck Ribéry	Fiorentina	
October	(Italy) Ciro Immobile	Lazio	
November	(Belgium) Radja Nainggolan	Cagliari	
December	(Serbia) Sergej Milinković-Savić	Lazio	
January	(Portugal) Cristiano Ronaldo	Juventus	
February	(Spain) Luis Alberto	Lazio	
June	(Argentina) Alejandro Gómez	Atalanta	
July	(Argentina) Paulo Dybala	Juventus	

=== Seasonal awards ===
Award	Winner	Club
Most Valuable Player	(Argentina) Paulo Dybala	Juventus
Best Under-23	(Sweden) Dejan Kulusevski	Parma
Best Goalkeeper	(Poland) Wojciech Szczęsny	Juventus
Best Defender	(Netherlands) Stefan de Vrij	Internazionale
Best Midfielder	(Argentina) Alejandro Gómez	Atalanta
Best Striker	(Italy) Ciro Immobile	Lazio

Team of the Year
Goalkeeper	(Italy) Gianluigi Donnarumma (Milan)			
Defence	(Germany) Robin Gosens (Atalanta)	(Netherlands) Stefan de Vrij (Internazionale)	(Italy) Leonardo Bonucci (Juventus)	(France) Théo Hernandez (Milan)
Midfield	(Italy) Nicolò Barella (Internazionale)		(Argentina) Papu Gómez (Atalanta)	(Spain) Luis Alberto (Lazio)
Attack	(Argentina) Paulo Dybala (Juventus)		(Italy) Ciro Immobile (Lazio)	(Portugal) Cristiano Ronaldo (Juventus)

== Season statistics ==
=== Top goalscorers ===
Rank	Player	Club	Goals
1	(Italy) Ciro Immobile	Lazio	36
2	(Portugal) Cristiano Ronaldo	Juventus	31
3	(Belgium) Romelu Lukaku	Internazionale	23
4	(Italy) Francesco Caputo	Sassuolo	21
5	(Colombia) Luis Muriel	Atalanta	18
5	(Brazil) João Pedro	Cagliari	18
5	(Colombia) Duván Zapata	Atalanta	18
8	(Italy) Andrea Belotti	Torino	16
8	(Bosnia and Herzegovina) Edin Džeko	Roma	16
10	(Slovenia) Josip Iličić	Atalanta	15

=== Hat-tricks ===
Player	Club	Against	Result	Date
(Italy) Domenico Berardi	Sassuolo	Sampdoria	4–1 (H)	1 September 2019
(Denmark) Andreas Cornelius	Parma	Genoa	5–1 (H)	20 October 2019
(Colombia) Luis Muriel	Atalanta	Udinese	7–1 (H)	27 October 2019
(Portugal) Cristiano Ronaldo	Juventus	Cagliari	4–0 (H)	6 January 2020
(Italy) Ciro Immobile	Lazio	Sampdoria	5–1 (H)	18 January 2020
(Slovenia) Josip Iličić	Atalanta	Torino	7–0 (A)	25 January 2020
(Colombia) Duván Zapata	Atalanta	Lecce	7–2 (A)	1 March 2020
(Denmark) Andreas Cornelius	Parma	Genoa	4–1 (A)	23 June 2020
(Croatia) Mario Pašalić	Atalanta	Brescia	6–2 (H)	14 July 2020
(Italy) Ciro Immobile	Lazio	Hellas Verona	5–1 (A)	26 July 2020
(Italy) Federico Chiesa	Fiorentina	Bologna	4–0 (H)	29 July 2020

Note

(H) – Home (A) – Away

=== Clean sheets ===
Rank	Player	Club	Clean sheets
1	(Argentina) Juan Musso	Udinese	14
2	(Slovenia) Samir Handanović	Internazionale	13
3	(Italy) Gianluigi Donnarumma	Milan	12
4	(Albania) Thomas Strakosha	Lazio	11
4	(Poland) Wojciech Szczęsny	Juventus	11
6	(Italy) Emil Audero	Sampdoria	9
6	(Italy) Marco Silvestri	Hellas Verona	9
8	(Poland) Bartłomiej Drągowski	Fiorentina	8
8	(Italy) Pierluigi Gollini	Atalanta	8
10	(Italy) Salvatore Sirigu	Torino	7
