= 2018–19 Serie A =

117th season of top-tier Italian football

Serie A
- Season: 2018–19
- Dates: 18 August 2018 – 26 May 2019
- Champions: Juventus; 35th title
- Relegated: Empoli; Frosinone; Chievo
- Champions League: Juventus; Napoli; Atalanta; Internazionale
- Europa League: Lazio; Roma; Torino
- Matches: 380
- Goals: 1,019 (2.68 per match)
- Top goalscorer: Fabio Quagliarella (26 goals)
- Biggest home win: Fiorentina 6–1 Chievo (26 August 2018); Internazionale 5–0 Genoa (3 November 2018)
- Biggest away win: Frosinone 0–5 Sampdoria (15 September 2018); Frosinone 0–5 Atalanta (20 January 2019)
- Highest scoring: Sassuolo 5–3 Genoa (2 September 2018); Sassuolo 2–6 Atalanta (29 December 2018); Sassuolo 3–5 Sampdoria (16 March 2019)
- Longest winning run: 8 games Juventus
- Longest unbeaten run: 27 games Juventus
- Longest winless run: 18 games Chievo
- Longest losing run: 7 games Chievo
- Highest attendance: 78,725; Internazionale 1–0 Milan (21 October 2018)
- Lowest attendance: 7,000; SPAL 1–0 Parma (Bologna, 26 August 2018)
- Total attendance: 9,199,649
- Average attendance: 24,931

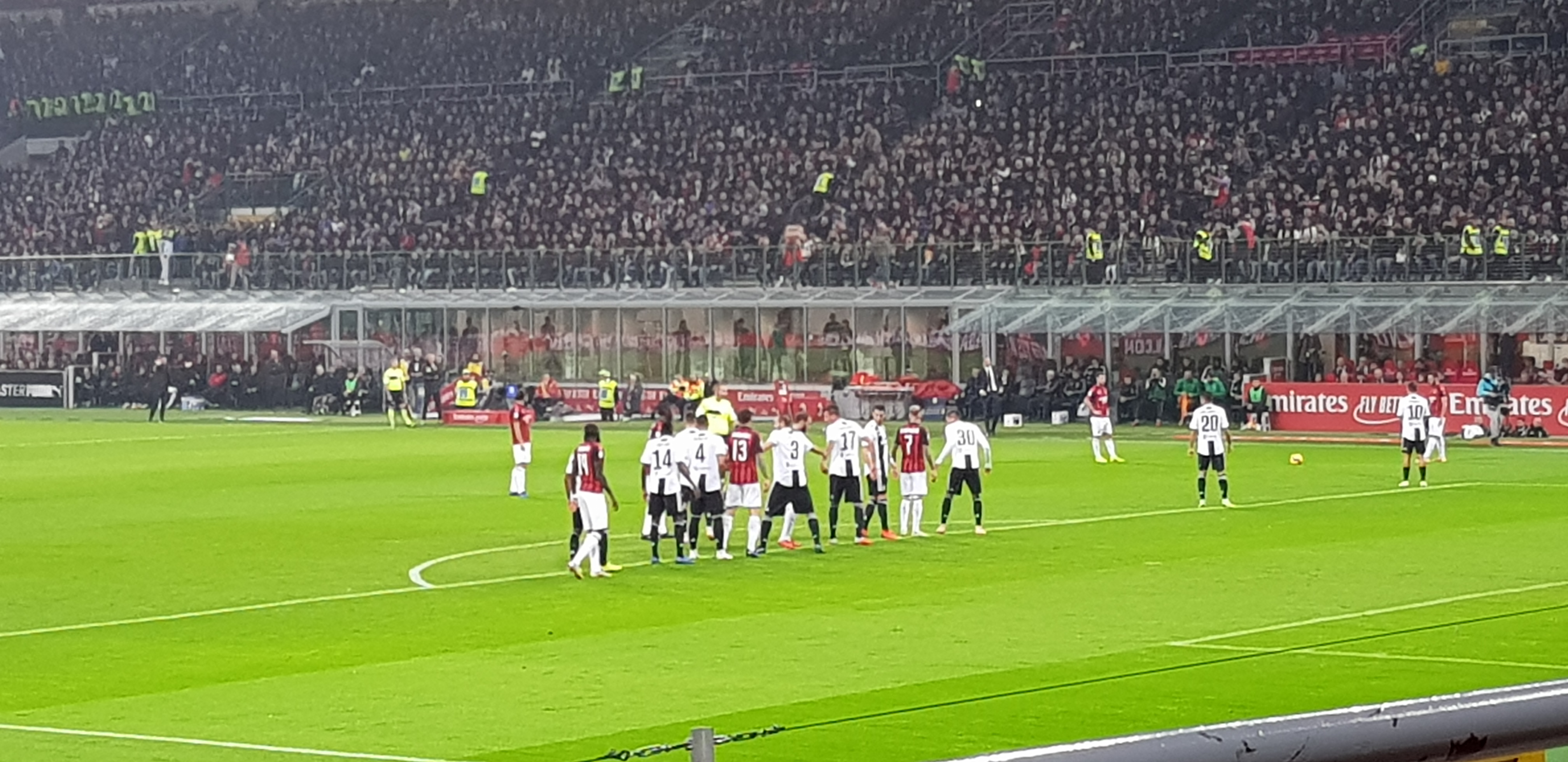
Milan-Juventus 2018–2019 in game

The 2018–19 Serie A (known as the Serie A TIM for sponsorship reasons) was the 117th season of top-tier Italian football, the 87th in a round-robin tournament, and the 9th since its organization under a league committee separate from Serie B. Juventus were the seven-time defending champions and defended their title following their victory against Fiorentina on 20 April 2019. The season was run from 18 August 2018 to 26 May 2019.

== Events ==
Hellas Verona and Benevento immediately returned to Serie B after finishing 19th and 20th while Crotone, finishing in 18th place, were relegated after two seasons in the top flight.

On 28 April, Empoli earned the right to come back to Serie A after one year of relegation. On 18 May 2018, Parma achieved promotion having finished second in the 2017–18 Serie B season, just three seasons after their bankruptcy relegation to Serie D. The last team promoted, after 2 years of absence, was Frosinone, who defeated Palermo in the Serie B play-off finals 3–2 on aggregate.

On 23 July, Parma were handed a 5-point deduction for the 2018–19 Serie A season, following text messages from Parma player Emanuele Calaiò "eliciting a reduced effort" from two players of Spezia during the 2017–18 season, a match Parma won 2–0 to secure promotion to this season. On 9 August, Parma had the 5-point deduction expunged.

On 14 August, the day of the Ponte Morandi bridge collapse in Genoa, the Italian Football Federation announced a minute's silence would be added for the victims of the collapse before all Serie A matches during the opening weekend that succeeded the incident. On 16 August, the Lega Serie A postponed the opening matches for both Genoese clubs Genoa and Sampdoria that were originally scheduled for 19 August.

On 13 September, Chievo was deducted 3 points after being found guilty of false accounting.

On 14 April 2019, Chievo was relegated from Serie A after a 3–1 defeat by Napoli, ending an eleven-year spell in the top flight.

On 20 April, Juventus won their 35th title and their eighth in a row with a win over Fiorentina.

On 5 May, Frosinone was relegated from Serie A after a 2–2 draw away at Sassuolo, going down after just one season.

On 26 May, Atalanta finished third and secured a place in the Champions League group stage, both for the first time in their history. Meanwhile, Empoli which were one point above the relegation zone ahead of Genoa, were eventually relegated to Serie B after they were defeated by Internazionale, while Genoa drew with Fiorentina.

This was also the last season of iconic Roma captain Daniele De Rossi that left the team after 18 seasons, while veterans Sergio Pellissier (from Chievo), Andrea Barzagli (from Juventus) and Emiliano Moretti (from Torino) retired from professional football at the end of the season.

== Teams ==
=== Stadiums and locations ===
Locations of the 2018–19 Serie A teams

Team	Home city	Stadium	Capacity	2017–18 season
Atalanta	Bergamo	Stadio Atleti Azzurri d'Italia	21,300	7th in Serie A
Bologna	Bologna	Stadio Renato Dall'Ara	38,279	15th in Serie A
Cagliari	Cagliari	Sardegna Arena	16,233	16th in Serie A
Chievo	Verona	Stadio Marc'Antonio Bentegodi	38,402	13th in Serie A
Empoli	Empoli	Stadio Carlo Castellani	16,284	Serie B champions
Fiorentina	Florence	Stadio Artemio Franchi	43,147	8th in Serie A
Frosinone	Frosinone	Stadio Benito Stirpe	16,227	Serie B playoff winners
Genoa	Genoa	Stadio Luigi Ferraris	36,685	12th in Serie A
Sampdoria	Genoa	Stadio Luigi Ferraris	36,685	10th in Serie A
Internazionale	Milan	San Siro	80,018	4th in Serie A
Milan	Milan	San Siro	80,018	6th in Serie A
Juventus	Turin	Juventus Stadium	41,507	Serie A champions
Torino	Turin	Stadio Olimpico Grande Torino	27,994	9th in Serie A
Lazio	Rome	Stadio Olimpico	72,698	5th in Serie A
Roma	Rome	Stadio Olimpico	72,698	3rd in Serie A
Napoli	Naples	Stadio San Paolo	60,240	2nd in Serie A
Parma	Parma	Stadio Ennio Tardini	27,906	2nd in Serie B
Sassuolo	Sassuolo	Mapei Stadium – Città del Tricolore (Reggio Emilia)	23,717	11th in Serie A
SPAL	Ferrara	Stadio Paolo Mazza	16,164	17th in Serie A
Udinese	Udine	Stadio Friuli	25,132	14th in Serie A

=== Personnel and kits ===
Team	Head coach	Captain	Kit manufacturer	Shirt sponsor(s)	
Team	Head coach	Captain	Kit manufacturer	Main	Other
Atalanta	(Italy) Gian Piero Gasperini	(Argentina) Alejandro Gómez	Joma	Radici Group	Front: U-Power; Back: Elettrocanali; Sleeves: Automha
Bologna	(Serbia) Siniša Mihajlović	(Switzerland) Blerim Džemaili	Macron	Liu·Jo	Back: Illumia
Cagliari	(Italy) Rolando Maran	(Italy) Luca Ceppitelli	Macron	ISOLA Artigianato di Sardegna	Front: Ichnusa; Back: Nieddittas; Sleeves: Io tifo positivo/Fluorsid
Chievo	(Italy) Domenico Di Carlo	(Italy) Sergio Pellissier	Givova	Paluani/Nobis/Canali System/Vicentini Carni/Fimauto/Mulish/Pescheria Viviani	Front: Salumi Coati; Back: Eurobet; Sleeves: Nobis Assicurazioni
Empoli	(Italy) Aurelio Andreazzoli	(Italy) Manuel Pasqual	Kappa	Computer Gross	Front: Sammontana (H)/Logli Massimo Saint-Gobain (A); Back: Giletti SpA; Sleeves: Tenute Piccini
Fiorentina	(Italy) Vincenzo Montella	(Argentina) Germán Pezzella	Le Coq Sportif	Save The Children	Back: Dream Loud Entertainment; Sleeves: New Generation Mobile
Frosinone	(Italy) Marco Baroni	(Italy) Daniel Ciofani	Zeus Sport	Banca Popolare del Frusinate	Front: 958 Santero/Confetti Maxtris; Back: Francia Latticini; Sleeves: Tiger Shop
Genoa	(Italy) Cesare Prandelli	(Italy) Domenico Criscito	Lotto	Giocheria	Front: Zentiva; Back: Leaseplan
Internazionale	(Italy) Luciano Spalletti	(Slovenia) Samir Handanović	Nike	Pirelli	Back: Driver
Juventus	(Italy) Massimiliano Allegri	(Italy) Giorgio Chiellini	Adidas	Jeep	Back: Cygames
Lazio	(Italy) Simone Inzaghi	(Bosnia and Herzegovina) Senad Lulić	Macron	Marathonbet	Back: Sèleco
Milan	(Italy) Gennaro Gattuso	(Italy) Alessio Romagnoli	Puma	Fly Emirates	None
Napoli	(Italy) Carlo Ancelotti	(Italy) Lorenzo Insigne	Kappa	Lete	Front: Pasta Garofalo; Back: Kimbo Caffè
Parma	(Italy) Roberto D'Aversa	(Portugal) Bruno Alves	Erreà	Cetilar	Front: Aon; Back: Viva la Mamma Beretta; Sleeves: Il Valutatore
Roma	(Italy) Claudio Ranieri	(Italy) Daniele De Rossi	Nike	Qatar Airways	Back: Hyundai
Sampdoria	(Italy) Marco Giampaolo	(Italy) Fabio Quagliarella	Joma	Invent Energy	Back: IBSA Group
Sassuolo	(Italy) Roberto De Zerbi	(Italy) Francesco Magnanelli	Kappa	Mapei	None
SPAL	(Italy) Leonardo Semplici	(Italy) Mirco Antenucci	Macron	Tassi Group	Back: BMW ErreEffe Group; Sleeves: Pentaferte
Torino	(Italy) Walter Mazzarri	(Italy) Andrea Belotti	Kappa	Suzuki/Suzuki Jimny (T)	Front: Fratelli Beretta; Back: SportPesa; Sleeves: N° 38 Wüber
Udinese	(Croatia) Igor Tudor	(Switzerland) Valon Behrami	Macron	Dacia	Front: Vortice; Back: Bluenergy

=== Managerial changes ===
Team	Outgoing manager	Manner of departure	Date of vacancy	Position in table	Replaced by	Date of appointment
Napoli	(Italy) Maurizio Sarri	Mutual consent	23 May 2018	Pre-season	(Italy) Carlo Ancelotti	23 May 2018
Bologna	(Italy) Roberto Donadoni	Mutual consent	24 May 2018	Pre-season	(Italy) Filippo Inzaghi	13 June 2018
Cagliari	(Uruguay) Diego López	Mutual consent	30 May 2018	Pre-season	(Italy) Rolando Maran	7 June 2018
Sassuolo	(Italy) Giuseppe Iachini	Mutual consent	5 June 2018	Pre-season	(Italy) Roberto De Zerbi	13 June 2018
Udinese	(Croatia) Igor Tudor	Mutual consent	7 June 2018	Pre-season	(Spain) Julio Velázquez	7 June 2018
Chievo	(Italy) Lorenzo D'Anna	Sacked	9 October 2018	20th	(Italy) Gian Piero Ventura	10 October 2018
Genoa	(Italy) Davide Ballardini	Sacked	9 October 2018	11th	(Croatia) Ivan Jurić	9 October 2018
Empoli	(Italy) Aurelio Andreazzoli	Sacked	5 November 2018	18th	(Italy) Giuseppe Iachini	6 November 2018
Chievo	(Italy) Gian Piero Ventura	Resigned, consensual resolution	13 November 2018	20th	(Italy) Domenico Di Carlo	13 November 2018
Udinese	(Spain) Julio Velázquez	Sacked	13 November 2018	17th	(Italy) Davide Nicola	13 November 2018
Genoa	(Croatia) Ivan Jurić	Sacked	7 December 2018	14th	(Italy) Cesare Prandelli	7 December 2018
Frosinone	(Italy) Moreno Longo	Sacked	19 December 2018	19th	(Italy) Marco Baroni	19 December 2018
Bologna	(Italy) Filippo Inzaghi	Sacked	28 January 2019	18th	(Serbia) Siniša Mihajlović	28 January 2019
Roma	(Italy) Eusebio Di Francesco	Sacked	7 March 2019	5th	(Italy) Claudio Ranieri	8 March 2019
Empoli	(Italy) Giuseppe Iachini	Sacked	13 March 2019	17th	(Italy) Aurelio Andreazzoli	13 March 2019
Udinese	(Italy) Davide Nicola	Sacked	20 March 2019	16th	(Croatia) Igor Tudor	21 March 2019
Fiorentina	(Italy) Stefano Pioli	Resigned	9 April 2019	10th	(Italy) Vincenzo Montella	10 April 2019

== League table ==
Pos	Team	Pld	W	D	L	GF	GA	GD	Pts	Qualification or relegation
1	Juventus (C)	38	28	6	4	70	30	+40	90	Qualification for the Champions League group stage
2	Napoli	38	24	7	7	74	36	+38	79	Qualification for the Champions League group stage
3	Atalanta	38	20	9	9	77	46	+31	69 (Note: Atalanta finished ahead of Internazionale on head-to-head points: Atalanta 4–1 Internazionale, Internazionale 0–0 Atalanta.)	Qualification for the Champions League group stage
4	Inter Milan	38	20	9	9	57	33	+24	69	Qualification for the Champions League group stage
5	Milan (Note: Milan were excluded from UEFA competitions over financial fair play violation.)	38	19	11	8	55	36	+19	68	
6	Roma	38	18	12	8	66	48	+18	66	Qualification for the Europa League group stage
7	Torino	38	16	15	7	52	37	+15	63	Qualification for the Europa League second qualifying round
8	Lazio	38	17	8	13	56	46	+10	57 (Note: Lazio were deducted 2 points by the Italian Football Federation.)	Qualification for the Europa League group stage (Note: Lazio qualified for the Europa League group stage by winning the 2018–19 Coppa Italia)
9	Sampdoria	38	15	8	15	60	51	+9	53	
10	Bologna	38	11	11	16	48	56	−8	44	
11	Sassuolo	38	9	16	13	53	60	−7	43	
12	Udinese	38	11	10	17	39	53	−14	43	
13	SPAL	38	11	9	18	44	56	−12	42	
14	Parma	38	10	11	17	41	61	−20	41 (Note: Positions determined by head-to-head points: Parma: 9 pts; Cagliari: 7 pts; Fiorentina: 1 pt.)	
15	Cagliari	38	10	11	17	36	54	−18	41	
16	Fiorentina	38	8	17	13	47	45	+2	41	
17	Genoa	38	8	14	16	39	57	−18	38 (Note: Genoa finished ahead of Empoli on head-to-head points: Genoa 2–1 Empoli, Empoli 1–3 Genoa.)	
18	Empoli (R)	38	10	8	20	51	70	−19	38	Relegation to Serie B
19	Frosinone (R)	38	5	10	23	29	69	−40	25	Relegation to Serie B
20	Chievo (R)	38	2	14	22	25	75	−50	17 (Note: Chievo were deducted 3 points after being found guilty of false accounting.)	Relegation to Serie B

Source: Serie A, Soccerway
Rules for classification: 1) Points; 2) Head-to-head points; 3) Head-to-head goal difference; 4) Goal difference; 5) Goals scored; 6) Draw. (Note: Head-to-head record is used only after all the matches between the teams in question have been played).
(C) Champions; (R) Relegated

== Results ==
Home \ Away	ATA	BOL	CAG	CHV	EMP	FIO	FRO	GEN	INT	JUV	LAZ	MIL	NAP	PAR	ROM	SAM	SAS	SPA	TOR	UDI
Atalanta	—	4–1	0–1	1–1	0–0	3–1	4–0	2–1	4–1	2–2	1–0	1–3	1–2	3–0	3–3	0–1	3–1	2–1	0–0	2–0
Bologna	1–2	—	2–0	3–0	3–1	0–0	0–4	1–1	0–3	0–1	0–2	0–0	3–2	4–1	2–0	3–0	2–1	0–1	2–2	2–1
Cagliari	0–1	2–0	—	2–1	2–2	2–1	1–0	1–0	2–1	0–2	1–2	1–1	0–1	2–1	2–2	0–0	2–2	2–1	0–0	1–2
Chievo	1–5	2–2	0–3	—	0–0	3–4	1–0	0–0	1–1	2–3	1–1	1–2	1–3	1–1	0–3	0–0	0–2	0–4	0–1	0–2
Empoli	3–2	2–1	2–0	2–2	—	1–0	2–1	1–3	0–1	1–2	0–1	1–1	2–1	3–3	0–2	2–4	3–0	2–4	4–1	2–1
Fiorentina	2–0	0–0	1–1	6–1	3–1	—	0–1	0–0	3–3	0–3	1–1	0–1	0–0	0–1	1–1	3–3	0–1	3–0	1–1	1–0
Frosinone	0–5	0–0	1–1	0–0	3–3	1–1	—	1–2	1–3	0–2	0–1	0–0	0–2	3–2	2–3	0–5	0–2	0–1	1–2	1–3
Genoa	3–1	1–0	1–1	2–0	2–1	0–0	0–0	—	0–4	2–0	2–1	0–2	1–2	1–3	1–1	1–1	1–1	1–1	0–1	2–2
Internazionale	0–0	0–1	2–0	2–0	2–1	2–1	3–0	5–0	—	1–1	0–1	1–0	1–0	0–1	1–1	2–1	0–0	2–0	2–2	1–0
Juventus	1–1	2–0	3–1	3–0	1–0	2–1	3–0	1–1	1–0	—	2–0	2–1	3–1	3–3	1–0	2–1	2–1	2–0	1–1	4–1
Lazio	1–3	3–3	3–1	1–2	1–0	1–0	1–0	4–1	0–3	1–2	—	1–1	1–2	4–1	3–0	2–2	2–2	4–1	1–1	2–0
Milan	2–2	2–1	3–0	3–1	3–0	0–1	2–0	2–1	2–3	0–2	1–0	—	0–0	2–1	2–1	3–2	1–0	2–1	0–0	1–1
Napoli	1–2	3–2	2–1	0–0	5–1	1–0	4–0	1–1	4–1	1–2	2–1	3–2	—	3–0	1–1	3–0	2–0	1–0	0–0	4–2
Parma	1–3	0–0	2–0	1–1	1–0	1–0	0–0	1–0	0–1	1–2	0–2	1–1	0–4	—	0–2	3–3	2–1	2–3	0–0	2–2
Roma	3–3	2–1	3–0	2–2	2–1	2–2	4–0	3–2	2–2	2–0	3–1	1–1	1–4	2–1	—	4–1	3–1	0–2	3–2	1–0
Sampdoria	1–2	4–1	1–0	2–0	1–2	1–1	0–1	2–0	0–1	2–0	1–2	1–0	3–0	2–0	0–1	—	0–0	2–1	1–4	4–0
Sassuolo	2–6	2–2	3–0	4–0	3–1	3–3	2–2	5–3	1–0	0–3	1–1	1–4	1–1	0–0	0–0	3–5	—	1–1	1–1	0–0
SPAL	2–0	1–1	2–2	0–0	2–2	1–4	0–3	1–1	1–2	2–1	1–0	2–3	1–2	1–0	2–1	1–2	0–2	—	0–0	0–0
Torino	2–0	2–3	1–1	3–0	3–0	1–1	3–2	2–1	1–0	0–1	3–1	2–0	1–3	1–2	0–1	2–1	3–2	1–0	—	1–0
Udinese	1–3	2–1	2–0	1–0	3–2	1–1	1–1	2–0	0–0	0–2	1–2	0–1	0–3	1–2	1–0	1–0	1–1	3–2	1–1	—

Source: Serie A
Legend: Blue = home team win; Yellow = draw; Red = away team win.
For upcoming matches, an "a" indicates there is an article about the rivalry between the two participants.

== Season statistics ==
=== Top goalscorers ===
Rank	Player	Club	Goals
1	(Italy) Fabio Quagliarella	Sampdoria	26
2	(Colombia) Duván Zapata	Atalanta	23
3	(Poland) Krzysztof Piątek	Genoa/Milan^{1}	22
4	(Portugal) Cristiano Ronaldo	Juventus	21
5	(Poland) Arkadiusz Milik	Napoli	17
6	(Italy) Francesco Caputo	Empoli	16
6	(Belgium) Dries Mertens	Napoli	16
6	(Italy) Leonardo Pavoletti	Cagliari	16
6	(Italy) Andrea Petagna	SPAL	16
10	(Italy) Andrea Belotti	Torino	15
10	(Italy) Ciro Immobile	Lazio	15

^{1} Piątek played for Genoa until matchday 20 and scored 13 goals.

=== Hat-tricks ===
Player	Club	Against	Result	Date
(Slovenia) Josip Iličić	Atalanta	Chievo	5–1 (A)	21 October 2018
(Belgium) Dries Mertens	Napoli	Empoli	5–1 (H)	2 November 2018
(Colombia) Duván Zapata	Atalanta	Udinese	3–1 (A)	9 December 2018
(Slovenia) Josip Iličić	Atalanta	Sassuolo	6–2 (A)	29 December 2018
(Colombia) Duván Zapata^{4}	Atalanta	Frosinone	5–0 (A)	20 January 2019

Note

^{4} Player scored four goals
(H) – Home (A) – Away

=== Clean sheets ===
Rank	Player	Club	Clean sheets
1	(Slovenia) Samir Handanović	Internazionale	17
2	(Italy) Salvatore Sirigu	Torino	15
3	(Italy) Gianluigi Donnarumma	Milan	13
4	(Italy) Andrea Consigli	Sassuolo	12
5	(Italy) Emil Audero	Sampdoria	11
5	(Poland) Wojciech Szczęsny	Juventus	11
7	(Italy) Luigi Sepe	Parma	10
7	(Poland) Łukasz Skorupski	Bologna	10
7	(Albania) Thomas Strakosha	Lazio	10
10	(France) Alban Lafont	Fiorentina	9

== Awards ==
In 2019, Serie A introduced the Serie A Awards for the first time, using calculations from Opta Sports and Netco Sports to determine the best players of the season.

Award	Winner	Club
Most Valuable Player	(Portugal) Cristiano Ronaldo	Juventus
Best Under-23	(Italy) Nicolò Zaniolo	Roma
Best Goalkeeper	(Slovenia) Samir Handanović	Internazionale
Best Defender	(Senegal) Kalidou Koulibaly	Napoli
Best Midfielder	(Serbia) Sergej Milinković-Savić	Lazio
Best Striker	(Italy) Fabio Quagliarella	Sampdoria

Serie A Team of the Year
Goalkeeper	(Slovenia) Samir Handanović (Internazionale)			
Defence	(Portugal) João Cancelo (Juventus)	(Senegal) Kalidou Koulibaly (Napoli)	(Italy) Giorgio Chiellini (Juventus)	(Serbia) Aleksandar Kolarov (Roma)
Midfield	(Italy) Nicolò Barella (Cagliari)		(Bosnia and Herzegovina) Miralem Pjanić (Juventus)	(Slovenia) Josip Iličić (Atalanta)
Attack	(Italy) Fabio Quagliarella (Sampdoria)		(Colombia) Duván Zapata (Atalanta)	(Portugal) Cristiano Ronaldo (Juventus)

== Attendances ==
#	Football club	Home games	Average attendance
1	Internazionale	19	58,789
2	AC Milan	19	54,667
3	Juventus	19	39,244
4	AS Roma	19	38,622
5	SS Lazio	19	37,191
6	Fiorentina	19	31,135
7	SSC Napoli	19	29,003
8	Genoa CFC	19	21,632
9	Torino FC	19	21,385
10	Bologna FC	19	21,237
11	Udinese	19	20,315
12	Sampdoria	19	20,264
13	Atalanta BC	19	18,196
14	Parma Calcio	19	16,522
15	Cagliari Calcio	19	15,399
16	SPAL	19	13,559
17	AC ChievoVerona	19	13,138
18	Frosinone Calcio	19	12,746
19	US Sassuolo	19	12,619
20	Empoli FC	19	9,506
