= Gianluca Grassadonia =

Italian footballer and coach

Personal information
- Date of birth: 20 May 1972 (age 54)
- Place of birth: Salerno, Italy
- Height: 1.80 m (5 ft 11 in)
- Position: Defender

Team information
- Current team: Lazio Women (head coach)

Senior career*
Years	Team	Apps	(Gls)
1988–1989	Salernitana	3	(0)
1989–1991	AC Milan	0	(0)
1991–1992	Salernitana	16	(0)
1992–1993	Foggia	9	(0)
1993–1996	Salernitana	61	(0)
1996	Cagliari	3	(0)
1996–1997	Cosenza	23	(0)
1997–2003	Cagliari	135	(2)
2003	Chievo	2	(0)
2003–2004	Venezia	16	(0)
2004–2005	Fidelis Andria	7	(0)
2005–2006	Juve Stabia	22	(0)
2006	Sant'Antonio Abate	10	(0)
2006–2007	Salernitana	10	(0)
Total		317	(2)

Managerial career
- 2009–2010: Salernitana
- 2011: Casertana
- 2011–2012: Paganese
- 2012–2013: Paganese
- 2013–2015: Messina
- 2015–2017: Paganese
- 2017: Pro Vercelli
- 2018: Pro Vercelli
- 2018: Foggia
- 2019: Foggia
- 2019–2020: Catanzaro
- 2021: Pescara
- 2021–2022: Paganese
- 2023–: Lazio Women
- * Club domestic league appearances and goals

Gianluca Grassadonia (born 20 May 1972) is an Italian professional football coach and a former player. He is the head coach of Serie A Femminile side Lazio.

== Playing career ==
Born in Salerno, Grassadonia started his playing career by growing from the youth ranks of hometown club Salernitana and then making his senior debut in 1988. In 1992, he made his Serie A debut as a Foggia player. His longest stint as a player was between 1997 and 2003 with Cagliari, with whom he played 135 league games.

== Coaching career ==
After retirement, Grassadonia took over a youth coaching role at Salernitana. In November 2009 he replaced Marco Cari as head coach, being however sacked later in March 2010 due to poor results. He successively served as head coach of Serie D club Casertana from February to June 2011.

In July 2011 he was named new head coach of Lega Pro Seconda Divisione club Paganese. After resigning from his post in January 2012, he returned to Paganese later in April and guided them to promotion through playoffs by the end of the season.

In December 2013 he took over at Messina, guiding them to win the Lega Pro Seconda Divisione season. He was sacked in March 2015 due to poor results.

In August 2015 he accepted to return to Paganese, guiding the small Campanian club to a surprising qualification to the promotion playoffs during the 2016–17 Lega Pro season.

In June 2017 he was named new head coach of Serie B club Pro Vercelli, replacing Moreno Longo. On 17 December 2017, he was sacked due to the poor results of the team and replaced by Gianluca Atzori. On 22 January 2018, he came back to Vercelli replacing Atzori. On 7 May 2018, he was re-sacked after a 5–1 away defeat against Spezia and replaced by Vito Grieco with the team in the relegation zone in 22nd place with 37 points. However Grieco, even if he won against the relegated team Ternana (2–1) did not avoid Pro Vercelli's relegation to Serie C.

On 30 June 2018, he was appointed as new Foggia head coach. He was removed from his managerial duties on 11 December 2018 after a string of negative results.

On 11 March 2019, he was appointed as new Foggia head coach.

On 21 October 2019, he signed a contract until the end of the 2019–20 season with Serie C club Catanzaro which will be automatically extended if Catanzaro achieves promotion to Serie B. He was dismissed by Catanzaro on 24 January 2020 following two consecutive losses.

On 14 February 2021, he was named new head coach of bottom-placed Serie B club Pescara, signing a contract until the end of the season.

On 5 September 2021, Grassadonia agreed to return in charge of his past club Paganese in the Serie C league. He was dismissed on 11 April 2022, leaving Paganese third-last placed in the league table.

On 8 May 2023, he took on his first managerial role in women's football, accepting the head coaching job at Lazio.

== Managerial statistics ==
As of 20 October 2021

Managerial record by team and tenure
Team	Nat	From	To	Record							
Team	Nat	From	To	G	W	D	L	GF	GA	GD	Win %
Salernitana	(Italy)	1 November 2009	14 March 2010	17	4	5	8	20	26	−6	23.53
Casertana	(Italy)	8 February 2011	6 June 2011	12	5	2	5	16	12	+4	41.67
Paganese	(Italy)	20 July 2011	18 January 2012	28	13	9	6	40	22	+18	46.43
Paganese	(Italy)	30 April 2012	18 June 2013	37	13	14	10	37	33	+4	35.14
Messina	(Italy)	3 December 2013	12 March 2015	53	18	14	21	64	70	−6	33.96
Paganese	(Italy)	6 August 2015	19 May 2017	77	25	22	30	93	97	−4	32.47
Pro Vercelli	(Italy)	14 June 2017	17 December 2017	20	4	6	10	23	33	−10	20.00
Pro Vercelli	(Italy)	22 January 2018	7 May 2018	18	4	7	7	19	26	−7	22.22
Foggia	(Italy)	30 June 2018	11 December 2018	15	4	5	6	22	27	−5	26.67
Foggia	(Italy)	11 March 2019	12 May 2019	9	3	2	4	10	10	+0	33.33
Catanzaro	(Italy)	21 October 2019	24 January 2020	15	6	4	5	19	15	+4	40.00
Pescara	(Italy)	14 February 2021	19 June 2021	15	3	6	6	11	19	−8	20.00
Paganese	(Italy)	5 September 2021	11 April 2022	8	4	1	3	7	7	+0	50.00
Total				324	106	97	121	381	397	−16	32.72
