= Roberto Boscaglia =

Italian footballer and coach

Personal information
- Full name: Rocco Boscaglia
- Date of birth: 24 May 1968 (age 58)
- Place of birth: Gela, Italy
- Position: Midfielder

Senior career*
Years	Team	Apps	(Gls)
1987–2004	Gela		

Managerial career
- 2004–2006: Akragas
- 2006–2007: Alcamo
- 2007–2009: Nissa
- 2009–2015: Trapani
- 2015–2016: Brescia
- 2016–2017: Novara
- 2017: Brescia
- 2018: Brescia
- 2018–2020: Virtus Entella
- 2020–2021: Palermo
- 2022: Foggia
- 2024: Ancona
- 2024–2025: Latina
- 2026: Sambenedettese
- * Club domestic league appearances and goals

Rocco "Roberto" Boscaglia (born 24 May 1968) is an Italian football coach and former midfielder.

== Career ==
A former amateur midfielder, Boscaglia took his first head coaching role in 2004 at the helm of Eccellenza club Akragas, obtaining a seventh and a second place in two seasons in charge. In 2006, Boscaglia took over from another Sicilian Eccellenza club, Alcamo, leading them to promotion to Serie D. This was then followed by two seasons at Nissa, during which he led the club to Serie D promotion (and a personal second consecutive Eccellenza title), then to a surprising third place in the top amateur flight.

Boscaglia's impressive results at Nissa sparked interest from ambitious Serie D club Trapani, owned by navigation entrepreneur Vittorio Morace, who offered him the vacant coaching role to bring the Granata back into professionalism. In his first season in charge, Boscaglia guided Trapani to second place behind Milazzo; however, the club was later admitted to Lega Pro Seconda Divisione that season to fill a vacancy in the league.

In his first taste of professional football, Boscaglia led Trapani to another second place, defeating Avellino in the promotion play-off final to ensure his club a second consecutive promotion.

In the 2011–12 season, Trapani - now in the Italian third tier, Lega Pro Prima Divisione - surprisingly emerged as contenders for a third consecutive promotion, missing out on the last weekday to Spezia Calcio and then losing to Virtus Lanciano in the playoff finals. However, promotion was only delayed by one season as Boscaglia surprisingly led Trapani to a championship title the following year against the likes of Lecce, who were unanimously tipped as title favourites and ensured a historical first Serie B campaign ever for the Sicilian minnows. As head coach of a newly promoted Serie B club, he was therefore successfully admitted to the yearly UEFA Pro Licence course to be held in Coverciano.

Boscaglia was dismissed as head coach of Trapani on 10 March 2015, after six years in charge, due to poor results; his role was taken over by Serse Cosmi.

For the 2015–16 season, Boscaglia was named head coach of Brescia. He left Brescia in June 2016 to accept an offer from Novara, another Serie B club.

On 3 June 2017, after completing an entire season in charge of Novara, he agreed to return to Brescia as their head coach for the 2017–18 Serie B season. He was replaced by Pasquale Marino on 12 October 2017, only a few weeks after the club's takeover by Massimo Cellino. On 16 January 2018, he returned to Brescia following Marino's firing. He was however sacked once again on 29 April, leaving Brescia in thirteenth place in the Serie B table.

On 10 July 2018, he was appointed manager of Virtus Entella. On his first season in charge, he guided Virtus Entella to immediate promotion to Serie B as Serie C/A champions.

On 18 August 2020, Boscaglia was appointed manager of Palermo. He was sacked on 27 February 2021 following a 0–1 loss to Viterbese that left the Rosanero in mid-table zone, well below the top league spots.

In June 2022, after almost a year and a half of inactivity, Boscaglia was unveiled as the new head coach of Serie C club Foggia. On 27 September 2022, he left Foggia by mutual consent following a dismal start of the season, with only four points gained in the first five league games.

On 25 March 2024, Boscaglia returned to management as the new head coach of Serie C club Ancona until the end of the season, with an automatic contract extension in case of no relegation. After guiding Ancona to escape relegation, he was confirmed for one more season, but eventually found himself unemployed following the club's exclusion from Serie C due to financial issues.

On 25 October 2024, Boscaglia was hired as the new head coach of fellow Serie C club Latina. He was dismissed on 5 April 2025 following a poor run of results.

On 17 February 2026, Boscaglia signed for Sambenedettese. After guiding Sambenedettese to safety, he signed a two-year contract extension, being however dismissed after seven games in the new season.

== Managerial statistics ==
As of 27 February 2021

Managerial record by team and tenure
Team	Nat	From	To	Record				
Team	Nat	From	To	G	W	D	L	Win %
Akragas	(Italy)	12 June 2004	16 May 2006	77	43	13	21	55.84
Alcamo	(Italy)	16 May 2006	30 June 2007	39	24	11	4	61.54
Nissa	(Italy)	30 June 2007	13 July 2009	81	47	16	18	58.02
Trapani	(Italy)	13 July 2009	10 March 2015	235	108	63	64	45.96
Brescia	(Italy)	24 June 2015	18 June 2016	44	14	13	17	31.82
Novara	(Italy)	18 June 2016	3 June 2017	45	17	11	17	37.78
Brescia	(Italy)	3 June 2017	11 October 2017	10	3	4	3	30.00
Brescia	(Italy)	16 January 2018	29 April 2018	17	6	5	6	35.29
Virtus Entella	(Italy)	10 July 2018	14 August 2020	83	36	24	23	43.37
Palermo	(Italy)	18 August 2020	27 February 2021	26	8	9	9	30.77
Total				657	306	169	182	46.58
