= Driver Reifen und KFZ-Technik =

German company providing tire and car services

Driver Reifen und KFZ-Technik GmbH
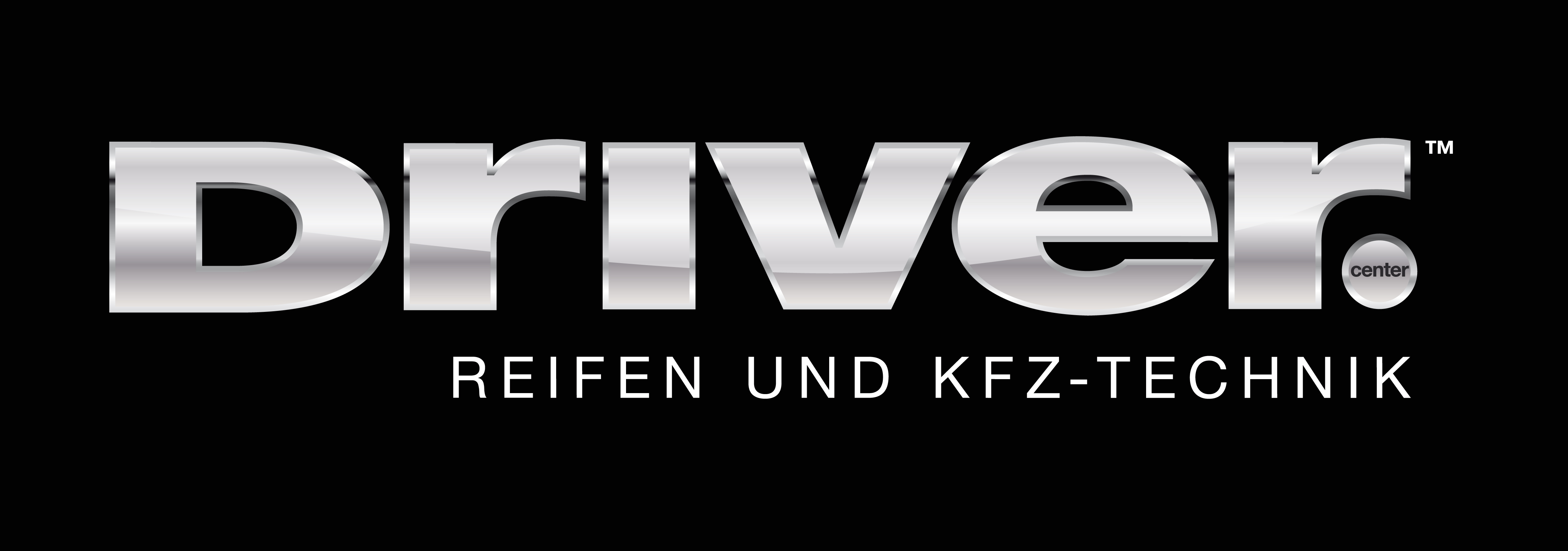
- Type: Gmbh
- Industry: Tire retail and automotive technology
- Founded: 1979
- Headquarters: Breuberg/Odenwald
- Key people: Thorsten Schäfer
- Revenue: > €100 million
- Number of employees: > 500
- Website: www.pneumobil.info

Driver Reifen und KFZ-Technik is a German company providing tire and car services. Since 1994, the company has been part of the Italian tire manufacturer Pirelli and is a 100% subsidiary of Deutsche Pirelli Reifen Holding GmbH. The company has more than 80 stores in Germany operating under several brand names including Pneumobil, Driver, and Reifen-Wagner. It employs approximately 500 people and had revenues of approx. €100 million in 2016. The company offers services relating to tires, rims, car accessories, and other car services. The company is headquartered in Breuberg in the Odenwald region, on the factory premises of Pirelli Deutschland GmbH.

== History ==
The company was established in 1979 and acquired by the Pirelli Group in 1994. After taking over, among others, the branches of Reifen Laupichler in the metropolitan area of Hamburg and Hanover the company, then named Pneumobil GmbH, acquired the tire retailers Junginger of Metzingen and Reifen Herl of Nürtingen with a total of 15 stores on 1 November 2003.

Effective 1 January 2012, Christian F. Mühlhäuser took the helm of Pneumobil succeeding Hans-Ulrich Röske who had gone into early retirement after working more than 40 years for Pirelli Deutschland. Mühlhäuser joined Pirelli as a working student in 1993. Later, after studying engineering and obtaining an MBA degree at US universities, he assumed management functions in the areas of logistics and planning, quality and technology, and in Pirelli's headquarters in Milan. In 2009, he took the helm of the Pirelli motorcycle tire factory in Breuberg.

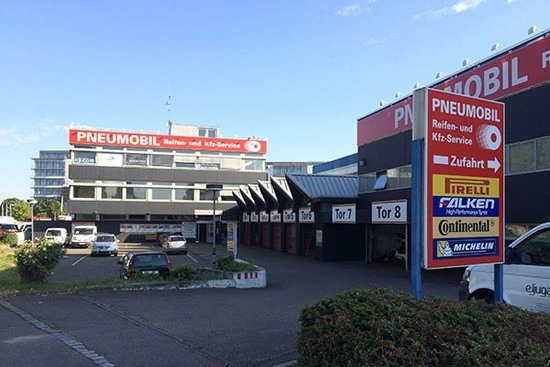
Pneumobil branch Stuttgart-Weilimdorf

Pneumobil went on to acquire more companies such as Reifen Blank of Düren on 1 August 2013 and PneuCenter RRT GmbH of Sindelfingen on 1 September 2013. At the same time, Pneumobil obtained possession of Reifen-Wagner R.W. Auto-Technik, a Landshut-based company offering specialized tire retail and car services. The 100 employees of Reifen-Wagner were kept on the payroll and the service network with a total of ten workshops exclusively based in the state of Bavaria was also taken over.

On 13 September 2013, Pneumobil opened its first Driver Center in Frankfurt. a building designed to turn “purchasing tires and car services into an experience.” The layout of the store's workshop area is inspired by the pit lanes in motor sports. Effective 1 October 2013, Pneumobil acquired Reifen-Wagner I.S. Auto-Service GmbH & Co. KG, also based in Landshut, with its 15 stores and 140 employees. September 2014 saw the opening of more Driver Centers in Bonn, Aachen, and Trier.

On 7 April 2017, Pneumobil GmbH changed its name to Pneumobil Reifen und KFZ-Technik GmbH by registering the new name in trade register B of the local court of Darmstadt. Shortly afterwards, on 1 July 2017, the Cologne-based tire retailer Reifen Schäfer e.K. was taken over by Pneumobil.

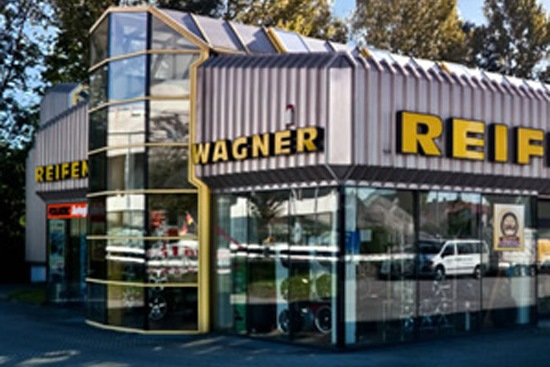
Pneumobil branch Ingolstadt

After a redesign of six Pneumobil stores in the area of Frankfurt and two Reifen-Wagner stores in Munich, there are 21 Driver Centers (as of October 2017) which are all 100% property of Pneumobil Reifen und KFZ-Technik GmbH. In addition, there are other Driver Centers in the network of Pneumobil's sister company Driver Handelssysteme GmbH which is also a subsidiary of Deutsche Pirelli Reifen Holding GmbH.

At the end of September 2017, the former Reifen Wagner branch in Hanauerstr. 42, Munich was reopened as the Driver Center Munich. The first European P-Zero World of the Pirelli Group was also formed within this Driver Center. Driver Reifen und KFZ-Technik GmbH have also been operating it since it opened.

On 29 December 2017, Pneumobil Reifen und KFZ-Technik GmbH changed its name to Driver Reifen und KFZ-Technik GmbH with legal effect. Christian F. Mühlhäuser was the Managing Director until 22 January 2018. On 1 July 2018, it was announced that he would become the Managing Director of the world's leading tire manufacturer, Bridgestone. On 16 March 2018, Thorsten Schäfer became the new Managing Director of Driver Reifen und KFZ-Technik GmbH. Since 1 August 2018, there have been two new locations in the Driver network: Haßloch and Landau in the Palatinate region.

This brings the total number of branches in Germany to 78.

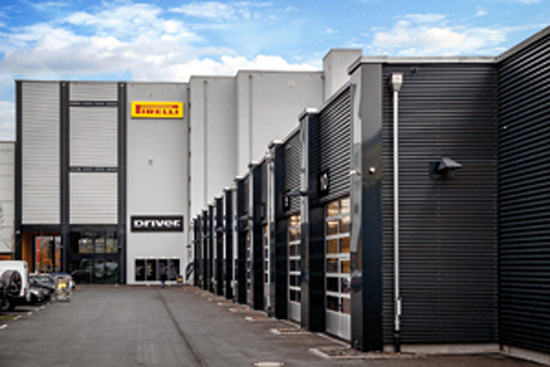
Pneumobil branch Frankfurt/Main

== Stores and brands ==
The approx. 80 stores of Pneumobil Reifen und KFZ-Technik GmbH operate under three different brand names. The Pneumobil brand is predominantly used in the Rhine/Main/Ruhr metropolitan areas as well as Stuttgart, Hamburg, and Hanover. In Bavaria, the company mainly relies on the Reifen-Wagner brand with its almost century-long tradition. Since the opening of the Frankfurt Driver Center in September 2013 new outlets also carry the Driver logo.

== Service portfolio ==
The company's product portfolio includes tires, rims, high-quality car services and car accessories for almost all types of vehicles, as well as fleet services. Driver also offers vocational training for retailers and car technicians and provides a cooperative degree program for high-school students wishing to become automobile dealers.
