= Boxeur Des Rues =

Italian streetwear and sportswear brand

Boxeur des Rues
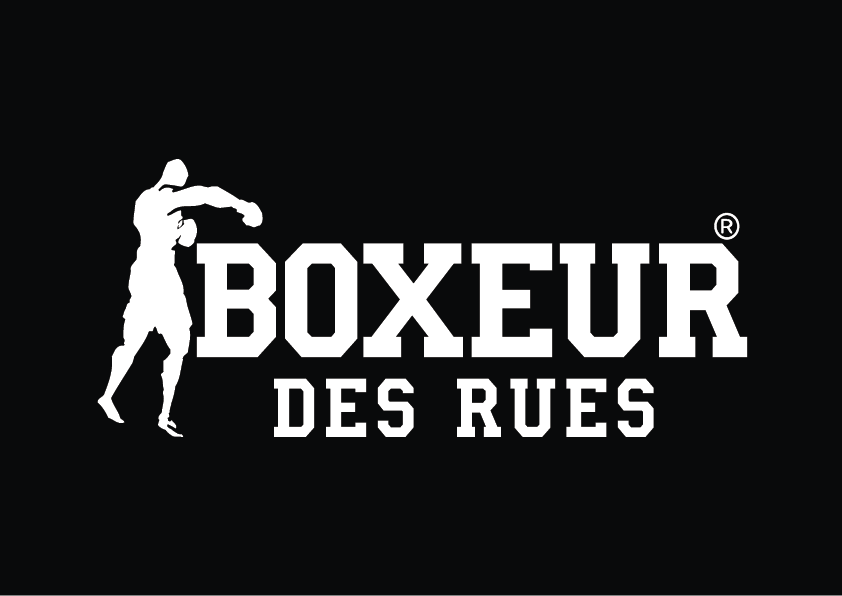
- Company type: Private
- Industry: Streetwear, activewear, sports equipment
- Headquarters: Milan, Italy
- Area served: Worldwide
- Products: Clothing, shoes, sporting goods
- Revenue: ▲€30 million (2016)
- Number of employees: 195
- Website: https://www.boxeurdesrues.com/

Boxeur Des Rues is an Italian streetwear and sportswear brand founded in 2003 owned by Boxeur Des Rues & Malloy S.r.l. a company based in Segrate, Italy. The company is active in design, manufacturing, licensing and marketing of fashion and sports clothing and goods, such as shoes and accessories.

== History ==
Boxeur Des Rues literally means "street fighting boxer". The brand is inspired by the world of Savate, the French boxing born by the fusion of traditional western boxing techniques and oriental Martial arts, that was learned by French sailors returning from the various ports of Far East and Southeast Asia at the beginning of the 19th century. Subsequently, these techniques merged with each other, evolving and beginning to be used in frequent street raids. Later in Marseille, the most important and toughest European port, numerous illegal combat circles (the "Fight Clubs") were born with a large round of betting around them. From here the name "Boxeur Des Rues": true sportsmen, born and raised on the streets. The brand is actually an expression of the fusion of "streetwear" and "sportswear".

In 2012, the company employed 195 people and reported revenues of €25 million. Boxeur Des Rues competes in the global market with other popular brands such as Nike, Adidas, Superdry.

== Distribution ==
While 80% of revenues come from Italy, Boxeur Des Rues has a strong product distribution network around the world with many stores in relevant countries:

- Austria
- Netherlands
- Spain
- Switzerland
- France
- Germany
- Moldova
- Slovenia
- Croatia
- Latvia
- Malta
- Montenegro
- Belgium
- Luxembourg
- Czech Republic
- Greece
- Ukraine
- Finland
- Sweden
- Russia
- China
- Hong Kong
- Taiwan

== Sponsorship ==
Since 2007 Boxeur Des Rues ® has been partner and technical supplier of several sport teams and organisations. I had several testimonials, including three olympic champions: Clemente Russo, Vincenzo Mangiacapre e Irma Testa.

=== Motorsport ===
- Pramac Racing Ducati (2007 – 2012, 2017 – today)
- ISPA KTM (2008)
- ONDE 2000 KTM (2007)
- Leopard Racing (2016 – today)

=== Basketball ===
- Pallacanestro Crema (2019–)

=== Combat sport ===
- Bellator (2017)
- Federazione Pugilistica Italiana (2012–2017)
- Italia Thunder (World Series of Boxing)
- Oktagon (2012–2017)
- Thaiboxe Mania (2017)

=== Cycle sport ===
- Giro d'Italia (2016)

=== Association football ===
- A.S. Cittadella (2017–2022)
- F.C. Südtirol (2017–2021)
- U.S. Folgore Caratese A.S.D. (2017-2021)
- Monza (2018-2019)
- Novara (2018-2019)

== In media ==
In 2015, in Italy, Boxeur Des Rues was the sponsor of various movies such as "Southpaw – The Challenge", distributed in collaboration with 01Distribution, and of "Creed – Born to Fight", in collaboration with Warner Bros. In 2016 he is also the sponsor of "Bleed for This".
