= Acerbis =

Italian sports gear manufacturer

Acerbis S.p.A.
- Type: Private
- Industry: Textile
- Founded: 1973
- Headquarters: Albino, Bergamo, Italy
- Products: Racing suits, helmets, shoulder pads, clothing, association football balls
- Website: acerbis.it

Acerbis S.p.A. is an Italian sporting goods manufacturing company. Acerbis focuses on motorcycle racing, producing racing suits, helmets, gloves, shoulder pads, and boots. Other products by Acerbis include association football balls and sportswear for multi-sport purposes, such as t-shirts, pants, shorts, socks, and other clothing items.

== History ==
The company was founded in 1973 by Franco Acerbis. The company began its business by producing motocross fenders, and then expanded its production to all thermoplastic components of motocross parts. It has two production units – one in Albino and one in the Czech Republic, and two distribution units, in the United States and the United Kingdom.

== Sponsorship ==
The company is the sponsor of the Netherlands round of 2017 Superbike World Championship (as Acerbis Dutch Round), as well as the shirt manufacturer of Italian football clubs: AlbinoLeffe, and other teams.

In 2016 Superbike World Championship, Acerbis sponsored the United Kingdom round.
