= Vito Grieco =

Italian footballer and manager

Personal information
- Date of birth: 6 February 1971 (age 55)
- Place of birth: Molfetta, Italy
- Height: 1.76 m (5 ft 9 1/2 in)
- Position: Midfielder

Youth career
- Bari

Senior career*
Years	Team	Apps	(Gls)
1989–1992	Bari	0	(0)
1989–1990	→ Carpi (loan)	13	(0)
1990–1991	→ Molfetta (loan)	25	(0)
1992–1994	Molfetta	56	(4)
1994–1996	Fasano	53	(1)
1996–1997	Casarano	4	(0)
1997–2000	Crotone	89	(13)
2000–2002	Modena	59	(10)
2002–2004	Catania	71	(5)
2004–2005	Crotone	17	(0)
2005–2006	Spezia	39	(0)
2007–2009	Reggiana	74	(4)
2009–2011	Spezia	15	(0)
Total		515	(37)

Managerial career
- 2018–2019: Pro Vercelli
- 2019: Sicula Leonzio
- 2020: Sicula Leonzio
- * Club domestic league appearances and goals

Vito Grieco (born 6 February 1971) is an Italian professional football manager and former player.

== Playing career ==
Born in Molfetta, the Province of Bari, Grieco started his career at Baris. He then played over 100 matches at Serie B, over 150 matches at Serie C1 and over 200 matches at Serie C2.

He won Serie B runner-up in 2002 with Modena, but he was not in the Modena plan in Serie A and sold him to Calcio Catania.

== Coaching career ==
On 24 October 2019 he was dismissed by Sicula Leonzio following 4 losses in 5 games. On 13 January 2020, he was hired by Sicula Leonzio once again. The club was dissolved at the end of the 2019–20 season.

== Honours ==
- Serie C1: 2000, 2001, 2006
- Serie C2: 2008
