= Moreno Longo =

Italian football manager (born 1976)

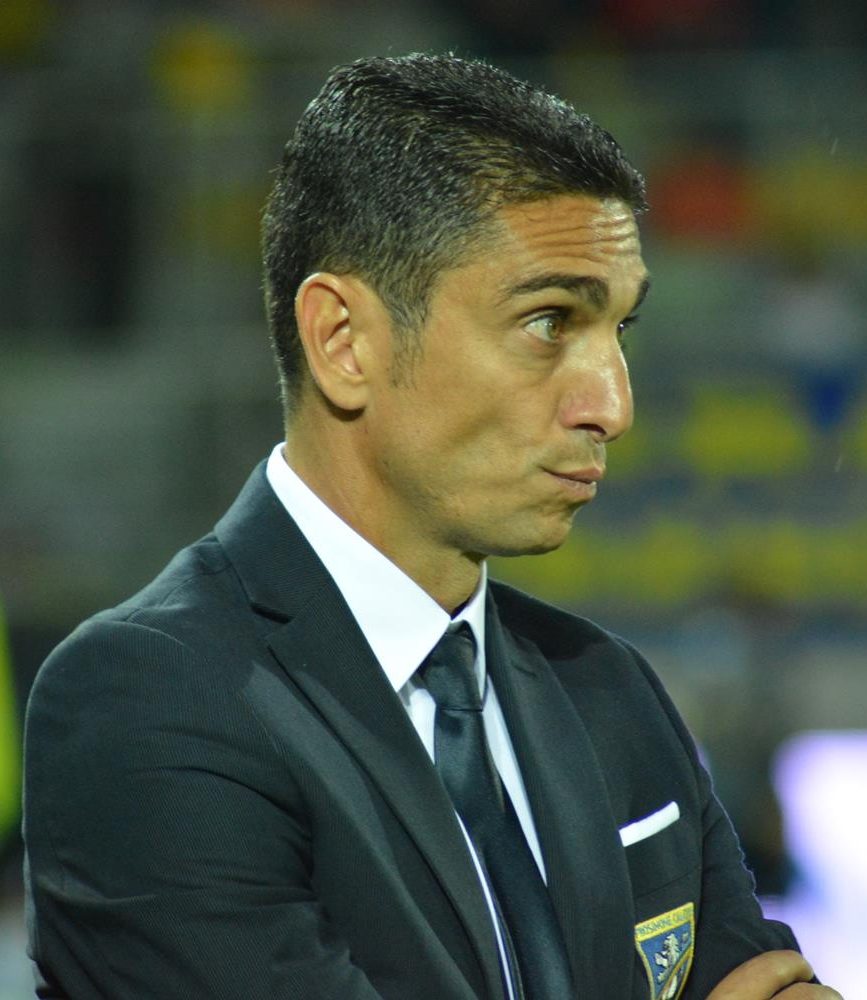
- Longo as manager of Frosinone in 2017

Personal information
- Full name: Moreno Longo
- Date of birth: 14 February 1976 (age 50)
- Place of birth: Grugliasco, Italy
- Position: Full-back

Youth career
- 19??–1987: Lascaris
- 1987–1994: Torino

Senior career*
Years	Team	Apps	(Gls)
1994–1997	Torino	31	(0)
1997–1999	Lucchese	68	(1)
1999–2003	Chievo	29	(0)
2003	Cagliari	2	(0)
2003–2004	Teramo	5	(0)
2004–2005	Pro Vercelli	23	(1)
2005–2006	Alessandria	17	(0)
Total		175	(2)

International career
1993	Italy U18	1	(0)
1996	Italy U21	2	(0)

Managerial career
- 2016–2017: Pro Vercelli
- 2017–2018: Frosinone
- 2020: Torino
- 2021–2022: Alessandria
- 2022–2023: Como
- 2024–2025: Bari
- 2026: Bari
- * Club domestic league appearances and goals

Moreno Longo (born 14 February 1976) is an Italian football manager and former football player.

== Club career ==
Moreno began his playing career with Lascaris youth team before moving to Torino in 1987, with whom he made his debut in Serie A in 1994–95 during a 5–1 defeat against A.C. Milan.

In the same year, he won the prestigious Torneo di Viareggio with the primavera, before earning two more caps for the first team in subsequent years. Between 1995 and 1996, he collected 11 appearances in Serie A for the granata which culminated with the third ever relegation of the club into Serie B. He played 18 times for the club in the cadets, but was also involved in the Torneo di Viareggio as part of the youth team, lost in the final against Bari.

In August 1997, he signed with Lucchese, again in Serie B (on loan initially). He stayed there for two seasons playing as a starter until the relegation of 1999. At the beginning of 1999–00, he wore the captain's armband for the provincial Tuscan side. Then, in September, he moved in co-ownership to Chievo.

He remained there until 2002 and was part of the team that earned the club's first promotion to Serie A in 2001. That season, Moreno was seriously injured and his appearances were limited to just 12. The following season, he never took to the field due to the effects of the injury.

In January 2003, he was loaned to Cagliari. In Sardinia, he returned to the field after a two-year stop, disputing all of two games in April, before returning to Chievo; where he was transferred indefinitely to Teramo in Serie C1. He played 5 times for the Abruzzi, however, in August 2004 he was attacked by ultras and left the team.

He continued his career in Serie C2 with Pro Vercelli and Alessandria, ending his career at age 30.

== International career ==
In September 1996, he was called up to the Italy U-21 team for the first time, in which he collected two appearances.

== Managerial career ==
=== Early career ===
He began his managerial career in 2007 with the Giovanissimi Nazionale of Filadelfia Paradiso, and led them to a regional title. The following year, he moved to Canavese, and achieved qualification for the knockout phase of the national championship in the same age group.

In 2009, he returned to Torino as the manager of the Allievi Nazionali, and in 2012, he became the manager of the Primavera squad. In the 2013–14 season, his squad finished as runners-up in the Campionato Nazionale Primavera, after losing the final 4–3 on penalties to Chievo. The following season, he led Torino to their ninth Primavera title, and their first since the 1991–92 season, after defeating Lazio on penalties. In 2015, he also won the Supercoppa Primavera against Lazio.

=== Pro Vercelli ===
On 8 June 2016, he became the new manager of Pro Vercelli in Serie B, with whom he signed a two-year contract. In his first season at Vercelli, he achieved safety from relegation in the penultimate round of the season. On 14 June 2017, he mutually agreed to end his contract with Pro Vercelli.

=== Frosinone ===
On 14 June 2017, he was appointed coach of Frosinone. After missing on automatic promotion to Parma on the final matchday of the 2017–18 Serie B season, he won the promotion playoffs, defeating Palermo in a two-legged final, thus bringing back Frosinone to Serie A after a two-year absence. He was sacked on 19 December 2018.

=== Torino ===
On 4 February 2020, Longo signed with his former club Torino. He guided the club until the end of the club's Serie A campaign, and was not confirmed for the next season.

=== Alessandria ===
On 22 January 2021, Longo accepted the manager's job at Serie C club Alessandria, another former team of his as a player, signing a 2.5-year contract. Under his tenure, he guided Alessandria to second place in the Girone A group, then winning the national playoff phase after defeating Padova on penalties in a two-legged final and ensuring the Grigi a Serie B spot for the first time in 45 years. Alessandria was relegated back to Serie C at the end of the 2021–22 season; on 29 July 2022, Longo mutually rescinded his contract with the club.

=== Como ===
On 20 September 2022, Longo signed a two-year contract with Serie B club Como. He was sacked on 13 November 2023.

=== Bari ===
On 19 June 2024, Longo was announced as the new head coach of Bari, signing a contract until 30 June 2026 with the Serie B club. After a mid-table finish, Longo departed Bari by the end of the 2024–25 season.

== Managerial statistics ==
As of match played 11 November 2023

Managerial record by team and tenure
Team	From	To	Record							
Team	From	To	G	W	D	L	GF	GA	GD	Win %
Pro Vercelli	8 June 2016	14 June 2017	44	11	19	14	39	50	−11	25.00
Frosinone	14 June 2017	19 December 2018	65	22	22	21	84	91	−7	33.85
Torino	4 February 2020	2 August 2020	16	3	4	9	20	29	−9	18.75
Alessandria	22 January 2021	29 July 2022	64	22	17	25	68	75	−7	34.38
Como	20 September 2022	13 November 2023	45	16	17	12	56	51	+5	35.56
Total			234	74	79	81	267	296	−29	31.62

== Honours ==
=== Player ===
Torino

- Torneo di Viareggio: 1995

=== Manager ===
Torino

- Campionato Primavera: 2014–15
- Supercoppa Primavera: 2015
