= 2019–20 Brescia Calcio season =

Brescia
2019–20 season
- Chairman: Massimo Cellino
- Head coach: Eugenio Corini (until 3 November); Fabio Grosso (5 November – 2 December); Eugenio Corini (2 December – 5 February); Diego López (from 5 February)
- Stadium: Stadio Mario Rigamonti
- Serie A: 19th (relegated)
- Coppa Italia: Third round
- Top goalscorer: League: Alfredo Donnarumma (7); All: Alfredo Donnarumma (8)
Home colours	Away colours	Third colours

The 2019–20 season was the 110th season in existence of Brescia Calcio. They returned to Serie A for the first time since 2010–11.

On 18 August, Brescia were eliminated in the third round of the Coppa Italia by Perugia.

== Players ==
=== Squad information ===
Last updated on 9 February 2020
Appearances include league matches only

No.	Name	Nat	Position(s)	Date of birth (age)	Signed from	Signed in	Contract ends	Apps.	Goals	Notes
Goalkeepers
1	Jesse Joronen	(Finland)	GK	21 March 1993 (age 33)	(Denmark) Copenhagen	2019	2022	20	0	
12	Lorenzo Andrenacci	(Italy)	GK	2 January 1995 (age 31)	(Italy) Milan	2014		10	0	
22	Enrico Alfonso	(Italy)	GK	4 May 1988 (age 38)	(Italy) Cittadella	2018	2021	33	0	
Defenders
2	Stefano Sabelli	(Italy)	RB	13 January 1993 (age 33)	(Italy) Bari	2018	2021	52	0	
3	Aleš Matějů	(Czech Republic)	RB	3 June 1996 (age 30)	(England) Brighton & Hove Albion	2019		18	0	
5	Daniele Gastaldello	(Italy)	CB	25 June 1983 (age 43)	(Italy) Bologna	2017	2020	59	3	
14	Jhon Chancellor	(Venezuela)	CB	2 January 1992 (age 34)	(Qatar) Al Ahli	2019	2020	20	2	
15	Andrea Cistana	(Italy)	CB	1 August 1997 (age 29)	(Italy) Youth Sector	2016	2021	51	1	
26	Bruno Martella	(Italy)	LB	14 August 1992 (age 34)	(Italy) Crotone	2019	2022	24	2	
29	Alessandro Semprini	(Italy)	RB	24 February 1998 (age 28)	(Italy) Youth Sector	2017	2021	7	0	
Midfielders
4	Sandro Tonali	(Italy)	DM	8 May 2000 (age 26)	(Italy) Youth Sector	2017	2021	75	6	
6	Emanuele Ndoj	(Albania)	CM	20 November 1996 (age 29)	(Italy) Roma	2016	2022	78	4	
7	Nikolas Špalek	(Slovakia)	AM	12 February 1997 (age 29)	(Slovakia) Žilina	2018	2021	58	5	
8	Jaromír Zmrhal	(Czech Republic)	LM / CM / RM	2 August 1993 (age 33)	(Czech Republic) Slavia Prague	2019	2023	7	0	
19	Massimiliano Mangraviti	(Italy)	CB / DM	24 January 1998 (age 28)	(Italy) Youth Sector	2016	2022	7	0	
23	Simon Skrabb	(Finland)	CF / LM / RM	19 January 1995 (age 31)	(Sweden) Norrköping	2020	2023	1	0	
24	Mattia Viviani	(Italy)	DM	4 September 2000 (age 26)	(Italy) Youth Sector	2018	2021	13	0	
25	Dimitri Bisoli	(Italy)	CM	25 March 1994 (age 32)	(Italy) Fidelis Andria	2017	2024	133	17	
27	Daniele Dessena	(Italy)	CM	10 March 1987 (age 39)	(Italy) Cagliari	2019	2020	21	1	
28	Rômulo	(Italy)	CM / RM / RB	22 May 1987 (age 39)	(Italy) Genoa	2019	2020	20	1	Loan
31	Birkir Bjarnason	(Iceland)	CM / LM / RM	27 May 1988 (age 38)	(Qatar) Al-Arabi	2020	2021	2	0	
Forwards
9	Alfredo Donnarumma	(Italy)	CF / LW / SS	30 November 1990 (age 35)	(Italy) Empoli	2018	2022	52	29	
11	Ernesto Torregrossa	(Italy)	CF / LW	28 June 1992 (age 34)	(Italy) Hellas Verona	2018	2020	98	31	
18	Florian Ayé	(France)	CF / LW / RW	19 January 1997 (age 29)	(France) Clermont	2019	2022	13	0	
45	Mario Balotelli	(Italy)	CF / RW / LW	12 August 1990 (age 36)	Free agent	2019	2022	16	5	
Players transferred during the season
16	Felipe Curcio	(Brazil)	LB	6 August 1993 (age 33)	(Italy) Fidelis Andria	2018	2020	33	0	
20	Giangiacomo Magnani	(Italy)	CB	4 October 1995 (age 30)	(Italy) Sassuolo	2019	2020	2	0	Loan
21	Alessandro Matri	(Italy)	ST	19 August 1984 (age 42)	(Italy) Sassuolo	2019	2020	8	0	Loan
23	Leonardo Morosini	(Italy)	AM	13 October 1995 (age 30)	(Italy) Genoa	2018	2022	105	18	
32	Luca Tremolada	(Italy)	AM	25 November 1991 (age 34)	(Italy) Virtus Entella	2019		19	4	

== Transfers ==
=== In ===
Date	Pos.	Player	Age	Moving from	Fee	Notes	Source
1 July 2019	DF	(Italy) Bruno Martella	26	(Italy) Crotone	€800k	Three-year contract; Signed permanently by option to buy	
1 July 2019	MF	(Italy) Luca Tremolada	27	(Italy) Virtus Entella	€900k	Signed permanently by option to buy	
2 July 2019	DF	(Czech Republic) Aleš Matějů	23	(England) Brighton	N/A	Undisclosed terms	
5 July 2019	FW	(France) Florian Ayé	22	(France) Clermont Foot	£1.80m	Three-year contract	
11 July 2019	GK	(Finland) Jesse Joronen	26	(Denmark) FC København	£4.50m	Three-year contract	
21 July 2019	DF	(Venezuela) Jhon Chancellor	27	(Qatar) Al Ahli	€700k	One-year contract	
6 August 2019	MF	(Czech Republic) Jaromír Zmrhal	26	(Czech Republic) Slavia Praha	€3.75M	Four-year contract	
18 August 2019	FW	(Italy) Mario Balotelli	29	Free agent	Free		

==== Loans in ====
Date	Pos.	Player	Age	Moving from	Fee	Notes	Source
7 August 2019	DF	(Italy) Giangiacomo Magnani	23	(Italy) Sassuolo	N/A		
2 September 2019	MF	(Brazil) Rômulo	32	(Italy) Genoa	N/A		
2 September 2019	FW	(Italy) Alessandro Matri	35	(Italy) Sassuolo	N/A		

=== Out ===
Date	Pos.	Player	Age	Moving to	Fee	Notes	Source
1 July 2019	DF	(Italy) Biagio Meccariello	28	(Italy) Lecce	Undisclosed	signed permanently after option to buy	
11 July 2019	GK	(Italy) Paolo Bastianello	21	(Italy) Frosinone	Undisclosed		

==== Loans out ====
Date	Pos.	Player	Age	Moving to	Fee	Notes	Source
20 July 2019	FW	(Italy) Matteo Cortesi	21	(Italy) Giana Erminio	Undisclosed		

== Pre-season and friendlies ==
17 July 2019 Friendly	Brescia (Italy)	8–1	(Italy) Rappresentativa Camuna	Darfo Boario Terme
17:30 CEST (UTC+2)	Dessena 4'; Tremolada 26'; Donnarumma 28'; Ayé 33'; Own goal 63'; Bisoli 72'; Morosini 84'; Torregrossa 85'	Report	42' Sorteni	Stadium: Comunale di Darfo Boario Terme; Referee: Jacopo Steffanoni

21 July 2019 Friendly	Brescia (Italy)	5–1	(Italy) Darfo Boario	Darfo Boario Terme
17:30 CEST (UTC+2)	Torregrossa 3', 46'; Viviani 9'; Donnarumma 32'; Sabelli 44'	Report	39' Pedersoli	Stadium: Comunale di Darfo Boario Terme; Referee: Renato Coradi

24 July 2019 Friendly	Brescia (Italy)	11–0	(Italy) Ciliverghe Mazzano	Darfo Boario Terme
17:30 CEST (UTC+2)		Report		Stadium: Comunale di Darfo Boario Terme; Referee: Francesco Passarotti

27 July 2019 Friendly	Brescia (Italy)	2–0	(Italy) Renate	Darfo Boario Terme
17:30 CEST (UTC+2)	Donnarumma 4'; Torregrossa 87'	Report		Stadium: Comunale di Darfo Boario Terme; Referee: Mattia Caldera

4 August 2019 Friendly	Brescia (Italy)	2–0	(Turkey) Beşiktaş	Grödig, Austria
17:00 CEST (UTC+2)	Donnarumma 45+3', 53'	Report		Stadium: Untersberg-Arena; Referee: Jäger Florian (Austria)

7 August 2019 Friendly	Brescia (Italy)	0–2	(Turkey) Alanyaspor	Westendorf, Austria
18:00 CEST (UTC+2)		Report	76' Djalma; 82' Bingöl	Stadium: Waldstadion; Referee: Daniel Pfister (Austria)

10 August 2019 Friendly	Brescia (Italy)	2–1	(Spain) Real Valladolid	Mantova
18:00 CEST (UTC+2)	Torregrossa 30'; Morosini 90+3'	Report	18' Sandro	Stadium: Stadio Danilo Martelli; Referee: Daniele Chiffi

4 September 2019 Friendly	Mantova (Italy)	1–5	(Italy) Brescia	Mantova
18:00 CEST (UTC+2)	Altinier 29'	Report	38' Semprini; 65', 67' Morosini; 78', 84' Tremolada	Stadium: Stadio Danilo Martelli; Attendance: 612; Referee: Daniele De Tommaso

7 September 2019 Friendly	Brescia (Italy)	3–2	(Italy) Frosinone	Ospitaletto
15:00 CEST (UTC+2)	Balotelli 25'; Rômulo 33'; Bisoli 58'	Report	52' Trotta; 88' Vitale	Stadium: Stadio Comunale Gino Corioni; Attendance: 2,000; Referee: Lorenzo Illuzzi

9 October 2019 Friendly	Brescia (Italy)	11–0	(Italy) Bagnolese	Brescia
15:00 CEST (UTC+2)		Report		Stadium: Stadio Mario Rigamonti; Referee: Kevin Bonacina

14 November 2019 Friendly	Ciliverghe Mazzano (Italy)	1–4	(Italy) Brescia	Mazzano
15:00 CET (UTC+1)	De Angelis 58'	Report	5', 29' Morosini; 22' Zmrhal; 69' Donnarumma	Stadium: Centro Sportivo Comunale; Referee: Gianmarco Vailati

17 June 2020 Friendly	Udinese (Italy)	2–0	(Italy) Brescia	Udine
18:30 CEST (UTC+2)	Teodorczyk 4'; Samir 82'	Report		Stadium: Stadio Friuli; Referee: Giovanni Ayroldi

== Competitions ==
=== Serie A ===
==== League table ====
Pos	Team	Pld	W	D	L	GF	GA	GD	Pts	Qualification or relegation
16	Torino	38	11	7	20	46	68	−22	40	
17	Genoa	38	10	9	19	47	73	−26	39	
18	Lecce (R)	38	9	8	21	52	85	−33	35	Relegation to Serie B
19	Brescia (R)	38	6	7	25	35	79	−44	25	Relegation to Serie B
20	SPAL (R)	38	5	5	28	27	77	−50	20	Relegation to Serie B

Source: Serie A, Soccerway
Rules for classification: 1) Points; 2) Head-to-head points; 3) Head-to-head goal difference; 4) Goal difference; 5) Goals scored; 6) Draw. (Note: Head-to-head record is used only after all the matches between the teams in question have been played)
(R) Relegated

==== Results summary ====
Overall								Home						Away					
Pld	W	D	L	GF	GA	GD	Pts	W	D	L	GF	GA	GD	W	D	L	GF	GA	GD
38	6	7	25	35	79	−44	25	3	5	12	21	37	−16	3	2	13	14	42	−28

Last updated: 1 August 2020.
Source: Competitive matches

==== Results by round ====
Round	1	2	3	4	5	6	7	8	9	10	11	12	13	14	15	16	17	18	19	20	21	22	23	24	25	26	27	28	29	30	31	32	33	34	35	36	37	38
Ground	A	A	H	A	H	A	H	H	A	H	A	H	A	H	A	H	A	H	A	H	H	A	H	A	H	A	A	H	A	H	A	H	A	H	A	H	A	H
Result	W	L	L	W	L	L	L	D	L	L	L	L	L	L	W	W	D	L	L	D	L	L	D	L	L	L	D	D	L	W	L	L	L	W	L	L	L	D
Position	6	12	15	11	11	15	16	15	18	18	19	20	20	20	19	18	18	18	19	19	20	19	19	19	19	20	20	20	20	19	19	19	19	19	19	19	19	19

Updated to match(es) played on 1 August 2020. Source: Competitive matches
A = Away; H = Home; W = Win; D = Draw; L = Loss

==== Matches ====
25 August 2019 1	Cagliari	0–1	Brescia	Cagliari
20:45 CEST (UTC+02:00)	Lykogiannis (yellow card) 45+3'; Pinna (yellow card) 71'	Report	Donnarumma 54' (pen.); Ayé (yellow card) 61'; Dessena (yellow card) 74'	Stadium: Sardegna Arena; Attendance: 16,099; Referee: Eugenio Abbattista

31 August 2019 2	Milan	1–0	Brescia	Milan
18:00 CEST (UTC+02:00)	Çalhanoğlu 12', (yellow card) 65'; Silva (yellow card) 34'; Calabria (yellow card) 55'	Report	Dessena (yellow card) 24'; Cistana (yellow card) 30'; Bisoli (yellow card) 39'; Tonali (yellow card) 90+3'	Stadium: San Siro; Attendance: 56,691; Referee: Rosario Abisso

15 September 2019 3	Brescia	3–4	Bologna	Brescia
15:00 CEST (UTC+02:00)	Donnarumma 10', 19'; Dessena (yellow card) 21' (yellow-red card) 48'; Cistana 42'	Report	Bani (yellow card) 12', (goal) 36'; Denswil (yellow card) 45+2'; Palacio 56'; Sabelli 60' (o.g.); Santander (yellow card) 67'; Soriano (yellow card) 69'; Orsolini 80'; Medel (yellow card) 83'; Olsen (yellow card) 90+3'	Stadium: Stadio Mario Rigamonti; Attendance: 15,000; Referee: Gianluca Rocchi

21 September 2019 4	Udinese	0–1	Brescia	Udine
15:00 CEST (UTC+02:00)	Jajalo (yellow card) 21'; Becão (yellow card) 45+2'; Pussetto (yellow card) 57'; Okaka (yellow card) 82'	Report	Matějů (yellow card) 11'; Bisoli (yellow card) 15'; Rômulo 57'; Chancellor (yellow card) 61'; Ayé (yellow card) 85'	Stadium: Dacia Arena; Attendance: 19,611; Referee: Paolo Valeri

24 September 2019 5	Brescia	1–2	Juventus	Brescia
21:00 CEST (UTC+02:00)	Donnarumma 4'; Cistana (yellow card) 79'	Report	Khedira (yellow card) 7'; Chancellor 40' (o.g.); Bonucci (yellow card) 41'; De Ligt (yellow card) 56'; Pjanić 63'	Stadium: Stadio Mario Rigamonti; Attendance: 18,500; Referee: Fabrizio Pasqua

29 September 2019 6	Napoli	2–1	Brescia	Naples
12:30 CEST (UTC+02:00)	Mertens 13'; Manolas (yellow card) 19', (goal) 45+4'; Hysaj (yellow card) 78'	Report	Sabelli (yellow card) 33'; Balotelli 67'	Stadium: Stadio San Paolo; Attendance: 45,000; Referee: Gianluca Manganiello

21 October 2019 8	Brescia	0–0	Fiorentina	Brescia
21:00 CEST (UTC+02:00)		Report	Pulgar (yellow card) 53'; Chiesa (yellow card) 66'; Ribéry (yellow card) 77'	Stadium: Stadio Mario Rigamonti; Attendance: 16,000; Referee: Gianpaolo Calvarese

26 October 2019 9	Genoa	3–1	Brescia	Genoa
20:45 CEST (UTC+02:00)	Ankersen (yellow card) 42'; Ghiglione (yellow card) 45+3'; Agudelo (yellow card) 60', (goal) 66'; Kouamé 75'; Pandev 79', (yellow card) 80'; Romero (yellow card) 82'; Radu (yellow card) 87'	Report	Bisoli (yellow card) 18'; Tonali (yellow card) 22', (goal) 34'; Balotelli (yellow card) 67'; Matri (yellow card) 90+3'	Stadium: Stadio Luigi Ferraris; Attendance: 20,949; Referee: Rosario Abisso

29 October 2019 10	Brescia	1–2	Internazionale	Brescia
21:00 CET (UTC+01:00)	Cistana (yellow card) 45'; Matějů (yellow card) 45+1'; Škriniar 76' (o.g.); Ndoj (yellow card) 79'; Balotelli (yellow card) 88'	Report	Martínez 23'; Candreva (yellow card) 26'; Gagliardini (yellow card) 44'; Škriniar (yellow card) 62'; Lukaku 63'	Stadium: Stadio Mario Rigamonti; Attendance: 16,500; Referee: Michael Fabbri

3 November 2019 11	Hellas Verona	2–1	Brescia	Verona
15:00 CET (UTC+01:00)	Empereur (yellow card) 20'; Salcedo 50'; Pessina 81'	Report	Martella (yellow card) 5'; Mangraviti (yellow card) 9'; Matějů (yellow card) 36'; Balotelli 85'; Tonali (yellow card) 90+4'; Matri (red card) 90+7'	Stadium: Stadio Marc'Antonio Bentegodi; Attendance: 16,525; Referee: Maurizio Mariani

9 November 2019 12	Brescia	0–4	Torino	Brescia
15:00 CET (UTC+01:00)	Cistana (yellow card) 15'; Matějů (yellow card) 26' (yellow-red card) 41'; Magnani (yellow card) 61'; Tonali (yellow card) 86'	Report	Belotti 17' (pen.), 26' (pen.); Ansaldi (yellow card) 35'; Lukić (yellow card) 59'; Meïté (yellow card) 73'; Berenguer 75', 80'	Stadium: Stadio Mario Rigamonti; Attendance: 13,500; Referee: Marco Guida

24 November 2019 13	Roma	3–0	Brescia	Rome
15:00 CET (UTC+01:00)	Smalling 49'; Mancini 57'; Dzeko 66'; Zaniolo (yellow card) 80'	Report	Rômulo (yellow card) 70'	Stadium: Stadio Olimpico; Attendance: 33,695; Referee: Marco Di Bello

30 November 2019 14	Brescia	0–3	Atalanta	Brescia
15:00 CET (UTC+01:00)	Torregrossa (yellow card) 19'	Report	Castagne (yellow card) 11'; Pašalić 26', 61'; Palomino (yellow card) 57'; Malinovskyi (yellow card) 79'; Iličić 90+2'	Stadium: Stadio Mario Rigamonti; Attendance: 14,000; Referee: Daniele Doveri

8 December 2019 15	SPAL	0–1	Brescia	Ferrara
15:00 CET (UTC+01:00)	Vicari (yellow card) 21'; Kurtić (yellow card) 42'; Cionek (yellow card) 45+2'	Report	Cistana (yellow card) 18'; Balotelli 54'; Magnani (yellow card) 72'; Joronen (yellow card) 90+5'	Stadium: Stadio Paolo Mazza; Attendance: 12,442; Referee: Daniele Orsato

14 December 2019 16	Brescia	3–0	Lecce	Brescia
15:00 CET (UTC+01:00)	Chancellor 32', (yellow card) 35'; Balotelli (yellow card) 38'; Torregrossa (yellow card) 40', (goal) 44'; Špalek (yellow card) 58', (goal) 61'	Report	Majer (yellow card) 11'; Shakhov (yellow card) 15'; Lapadula (yellow card) 45'; Tabanelli (yellow card) 45+2'; Calderoni (yellow card) 58'; Farias (yellow card) 76'	Stadium: Stadio Mario Rigamonti; Attendance: 13,131; Referee: Massimiliano Irrati

18 December 2019 7	Brescia	0–2	Sassuolo	Brescia
20:45 CET (UTC+02:00)	Špalek (yellow card) 45+2'; Torregrossa (yellow card) 54'	Report	Traorè 25'; Toljan (yellow card) 27'; Rogério (yellow card) 30'; Obiang (yellow card) 34'; Caputo 71'	Stadium: Stadio Mario Rigamonti; Attendance: 14,574; Referee: Marco Di Bello
Note: Match was originally scheduled for 4 October, but was postponed to 18 December due to the death of Sassuolo owner Giorgio Squinzi.

22 December 2019 17	Parma	1–1	Brescia	Parma
15:00 CET (UTC+01:00)	Gagliolo (yellow card) 69'; Hernani (yellow card) 69'; Grassi 90+2', (yellow card) 90+3'	Report	Cistana (yellow card) 28'; Balotelli 72'; Matějů (yellow card) 75'	Stadium: Stadio Ennio Tardini; Attendance: 16,686; Referee: Francesco Fourneau

5 January 2020 18	Brescia	1–2	Lazio	Brescia
12:30 CET (UTC+01:00)	Balotelli 18', (yellow card) 47'; Cistana (yellow card) 35' (red card) 40'; Tonali (yellow card) 43'; Bisoli (yellow card) 57'; Chancellor (yellow card) 86'	Report	Immobile 42' (pen.), 90+1'; Radu (yellow card) 56'; Parolo (yellow card) 57'; Jony (yellow card) 65'; Cataldi (yellow card) 72'	Stadium: Stadio Mario Rigamonti; Attendance: 14,370; Referee: Gianluca Manganiello

12 January 2020 19	Sampdoria	5–1	Brescia	Genoa
15:00 CET (UTC+01:00)	Vieira (yellow card) 22'; Linetty 34'; Murru (yellow card) 42'; Jankto 45+3'; Quagliarella 69' (pen.), 90+2'; Caprari 77'	Report	Bisoli (yellow card) 10'; Chancellor 12'; Rômulo (yellow card) 38'; Mangraviti (yellow card) 68'	Stadium: Stadio Luigi Ferraris; Attendance: 20,117; Referee: Gianpaolo Calvarese

19 January 2020 20	Brescia	2–2	Cagliari	Brescia
15:00 CET (UTC+01:00)	Ndoj (yellow card) 18'; Torregrossa (yellow card) 22', (goal) 27', 49'; Tonali (yellow card) 51'; Balotelli (yellow card) 81' (red card) 81'	Report	João Pedro 21', 68' (pen.); Pisacane (yellow card) 26'; Nández (yellow card) 51'; Ioniță (yellow card) 88'; Pellegrini (yellow card) 89'	Stadium: Stadio Mario Rigamonti; Attendance: 12,133; Referee: Antonio Giua

24 January 2020 21	Brescia	0–1	Milan	Brescia
20:45 CET (UTC+01:00)	Sabelli (yellow card) 21'; Skrabb (yellow card) 89'	Report	Kjær (yellow card) 2'; Hernandez (yellow card) 36'; Conti (yellow card) 44'; Bennacer (yellow card) 62'; Rebić 71'	Stadium: Stadio Mario Rigamonti; Attendance: 19,451; Referee: Paolo Valeri

1 February 2020 22	Bologna	2–1	Brescia	Bologna
15:00 CET (UTC+01:00)	Mbaye (yellow card) 35'; Orsolini 43'; Danilo (yellow card) 45'; Poli (yellow card) 46'; Bani 89'	Report	Torregrossa 36' (pen.), (yellow card) 41'; Rômulo (yellow card) 45'	Stadium: Stadio Renato Dall'Ara; Attendance: 21,665; Referee: Daniele Doveri

9 February 2020 23	Brescia	1–1	Udinese	Brescia
15:00 CET (UTC+01:00)	Bisoli 81'	Report	Jajalo (yellow card) 7'; Sema (yellow card) 52'; Fofana (yellow card) 69'; De Paul 90+3'	Stadium: Stadio Mario Rigamonti; Attendance: 13,586; Referee: Marco Piccinini

16 February 2020 24	Juventus	2–0	Brescia	Turin
15:00 CET (UTC+01:00)	Bonucci (yellow card) 19'; Dybala 39'; Higuaín (yellow card) 43'; Bentancur (yellow card) 65'; Cuadrado 75'	Report	Ayé (yellow card) 33' (yellow-red card) 37'	Stadium: Allianz Stadium; Attendance: 40,841; Referee: Daniele Chiffi

21 February 2020 25	Brescia	1–2	Napoli	Brescia
20:45 CET (UTC+01:00)	Chancellor 26'; Matějů (yellow card) 49'; Martella (yellow card) 74'; Dessena (yellow card) 77'	Report	Insigne 50' (pen.); Fabián 54'; Mertens (yellow card) 67'; Elmas (yellow card) 74'; Milik (yellow card) 90'	Stadium: Stadio Mario Rigamonti; Attendance: 14,703; Referee: Daniele Orsato

9 March 2020 26	Sassuolo	3–0	Brescia	Reggio Emilia
18:30 CET (UTC+01:00)	Romagna (yellow card) 31'; Rogério (yellow card) 37'; Caputo 45', 61'; Locatelli (yellow card) 56'; Boga 75'	Report	Bisoli (yellow card) 29'; Balotelli (yellow card) 60'; Sabelli (yellow card) 83'	Stadium: Mapei Stadium – Città del Tricolore; Attendance: 0 Referee: Gianluca Manganiello
Note: Match was initially postponed to 13 May from its original date of 1 March due to concerns over the COVID-19 pandemic, but was later moved to 9 March to be played behind closed doors.

22 June 2020 27	Fiorentina	1–1	Brescia	Florence
19:30 CEST (UTC+02:00)	Cáceres (yellow card) 15' (yellow-red card) 70'; Ceccherini (yellow card) 22'; Pezzella 29'; Dalbert (yellow card) 32'; Chiesa (yellow card) 87'	Report	Donnarumma 17' (pen.); Papetti (yellow card) 61'; Semprini (yellow card) 75'; Špalek (yellow card) 82'; Torregrossa (yellow card) 86'	Stadium: Stadio Artemio Franchi; Attendance: 0 Referee: Federico La Penna
Note: Match was postponed to 15 March, then to 22 June, from its original date of 9 March due to schedule shuffling to allow for Sassuolo vs Brescia to be played following its previous postponement due to concerns over the COVID-19 pandemic. All subsequent matches were also shuffled to allow for this accommodation. On 9 March, all sports events in Italy were suspended until 3 April. This was the first match played since the COVID-19 pandemic lockdown in Italy.

27 June 2020 28	Brescia	2–2	Genoa	Brescia
17:15 CEST (UTC+02:00)	Donnarumma 10'; Semprini 13'; Matějů (yellow card) 45+1'; Dessena (yellow card) 69'; Bjarnason (yellow card) 75'; Sabelli (yellow card) 86'	Report	Falque 38' (pen.); Zapata (yellow card) 58'; Pinamonti 69' (pen.); Biraschi (yellow card) 71'	Stadium: Stadio Mario Rigamonti; Attendance: 0 Referee: Massimiliano Irrati

1 July 2020 29	Internazionale	6–0	Brescia	Milan
19:30 CEST (UTC+02:00)	Young 5'; Sánchez 20' (pen.); De Vrij (yellow card) 41'; D'Ambrosio 45'; Gagliardini 53'; Agoumé (yellow card) 64'; Eriksen 83'; Candreva 88'	Report	Matějů (yellow card) 19'; Semprini (yellow card) 62'	Stadium: San Siro; Attendance: 0 Referee: Gianluca Manganiello

5 July 2020 30	Brescia	2–0	Hellas Verona	Brescia
19:30 CEST (UTC+02:00)	Martella (yellow card) 17'; Papetti (yellow card) 43', (goal) 52'; Špalek (yellow card) 80'; Donnarumma 90+6'	Report	Di Carmine (yellow card) 71'	Stadium: Stadio Mario Rigamonti; Attendance: 0 Referee: Marco Piccinini

8 July 2020 31	Torino	3–1	Brescia	Turin
21:45 CEST (UTC+02:00)	Matějů 48' (o.g.); Belotti 58'; Zaza (yellow card) 76', (goal) 86'	Report	Torregrossa 21'; Papetti (yellow card) 52'; Tonali (yellow card) 57'; Donnarumma (yellow card) 82'	Stadium: Stadio Olimpico Grande Torino; Attendance: 0 Referee: Daniele Doveri

11 July 2020 32	Brescia	0–3	Roma	Brescia
19:30 CEST (UTC+02:00)	Tonali (yellow card) 9'	Report	Fazio 48'; Peres (yellow card) 61'; Kalinić 62'; Zaniolo 74'; Perotti (yellow card) 86'	Stadium: Stadio Mario Rigamonti; Attendance: 0 Referee: Gianpaolo Calvarese

14 July 2020 33	Atalanta	6–2	Brescia	Bergamo
21:45 CEST (UTC+02:00)	Pašalić 2', 55', 58'; De Roon 25'; Malinovskyi 28'; Zapata 30'	Report	Torregrossa 8'; Špalek 83'	Stadium: Gewiss Stadium; Attendance: 0 Referee: Gianluca Manganiello

19 July 2020 34	Brescia	2–1	SPAL	Brescia
19:30 CEST (UTC+02:00)	Špalek (yellow card) 14'; Zmrhal 69', 90+3'; Torregrossa (yellow card) 89'	Report	Dabo 42', (yellow card) 76'; Reca (yellow card) 58'	Stadium: Stadio Mario Rigamonti; Attendance: 0 Referee: Eugenio Abbattista

22 July 2020 35	Lecce	3–1	Brescia	Lecce
21:45 CEST (UTC+02:00)	Paz (yellow card) 17'; Lapadula 22', 32'; Saponara 70'; Majer (yellow card) 79'	Report	Sabelli (yellow card) 21'; Dessena 63'	Stadium: Stadio Via del Mare; Attendance: 0 Referee: Fabio Maresca

25 July 2020 36	Brescia	1–2	Parma	Brescia
17:15 CEST (UTC+02:00)	Torregrossa (yellow card) 20'; Dessena (yellow card) 29', (goal) 62'; Matějů (yellow card) 45'; Papetti (yellow card) 90+2'	Report	Darmian 59'; Kulusevski 81'	Stadium: Stadio Mario Rigamonti; Attendance: 0 Referee: Lorenzo Maggioni

29 July 2020 37	Lazio	2–0	Brescia	Rome
19:30 CEST (UTC+02:00)	Correa 17'; Lazzari (yellow card) 42'; Immobile 83'	Report	Papetti (yellow card) 51'; Tonali (yellow card) 54'	Stadium: Stadio Olimpico; Attendance: 0 Referee: Luca Massimi

1 August 2020 38	Brescia	1–1	Sampdoria	Brescia
18:00 CEST (UTC+02:00)	Gastaldello (yellow card) 26'; Torregrossa 49' (pen.)	Report	Vieira (yellow card) 36'; Léris 41'; Falcone (yellow card) 48'; Askildsen (yellow card) 81' (yellow-red card) 90+2'	Stadium: Stadio Mario Rigamonti; Attendance: 0 Referee: Michael Fabbri

=== Coppa Italia ===
18 August 2019 Third round	Perugia	2–1 (a.e.t.)	Brescia	Perugia
18:00 CEST (UTC+02:00)	Iemmello (yellow card) 33'; Carraro (yellow card) 78'; Melchiorri 90+3', (yellow card) 94'; Buonaiuto 98'; Dragomir (yellow card) 107'; Rosi (red card) 120'		Donnarumma 43'; Bisoli (yellow card) 70'	Stadium: Stadio Renato Curi; Attendance: 4,478; Referee: Marco Piccinini

== Statistics ==
=== Appearances and goals ===
No.	Pos	Nat	Player	Total		Serie A		Coppa Italia	
No.	Pos	Nat	Player	Apps	Goals	Apps	Goals	Apps	Goals
Goalkeepers
1	GK	(Finland) FIN	Jesse Joronen	30	0	29	0	1	0
12	GK	(Italy) ITA	Lorenzo Andrenacci	6	0	5+1	0	0	0
22	GK	(Italy) ITA	Enrico Alfonso	4	0	4	0	0	0
Defenders
2	DF	(Italy) ITA	Stefano Sabelli	37	0	36	0	1	0
3	DF	(Czech Republic) CZE	Aleš Matějů	32	0	28+3	0	1	0
5	DF	(Italy) ITA	Daniele Gastaldello	8	0	4+4	0	0	0
14	DF	(Venezuela) VEN	Jhon Chancellor	27	3	26	3	1	0
15	DF	(Italy) ITA	Andrea Cistana	21	1	21	1	0	0
26	DF	(Italy) ITA	Bruno Martella	24	0	13+11	0	0	0
29	DF	(Italy) ITA	Alessandro Semprini	12	1	6+6	1	0	0
32	DF	(Italy) ITA	Andrea Papetti	11	1	10+1	1	0	0
Midfielders
4	MF	(Italy) ITA	Sandro Tonali	36	1	34+1	1	1	0
6	MF	(Albania) ALB	Emanuele Ndoj	18	0	6+12	0	0	0
7	MF	(Slovakia) SVK	Nikolas Špalek	26	2	20+5	2	1	0
8	MF	(Czech Republic) CZE	Jaromír Zmrhal	22	2	11+10	2	1	0
16	MF	(Italy) ITA	Andrea Ghezzi	5	0	0+5	0	0	0
19	MF	(Italy) ITA	Massimiliano Mangraviti	13	0	11+2	0	0	0
23	MF	(Finland) FIN	Simon Skrabb	10	0	3+7	0	0	0
24	MF	(Italy) ITA	Mattia Viviani	9	0	3+5	0	0+1	0
25	MF	(Italy) ITA	Dimitri Bisoli	26	1	24+1	1	1	0
27	MF	(Italy) ITA	Daniele Dessena	24	2	22+2	2	0	0
31	MF	(Iceland) ISL	Birkir Bjarnason	13	0	9+4	0	0	0
Forwards
9	FW	(Italy) ITA	Alfredo Donnarumma	32	8	20+11	7	1	1
11	FW	(Italy) ITA	Ernesto Torregrossa	26	7	22+3	7	1	0
18	FW	(France) FRA	Florian Ayé	23	0	15+7	0	0+1	0
45	FW	(Italy) ITA	Mario Balotelli	19	5	16+3	5	0	0
Players transferred out during the season
16	DF	(Brazil) BRA	Felipe Curcio	2	0	0+1	0	0+1	0
20	DF	(Italy) ITA	Giangiacomo Magnani	3	0	1+1	0	1	0
21	FW	(Italy) ITA	Alessandro Matri	8	0	0+8	0	0	0
23	MF	(Italy) ITA	Leonardo Morosini	3	0	0+3	0	0	0
28	MF	(Italy) ITA	Rômulo	22	1	19+3	1	0	0
32	MF	(Italy) ITA	Luca Tremolada	2	0	0+1	0	0+1	0

Last updated: 1 August 2020
Source: Competitions

=== Goalscorers ===
Rank	No.	Pos	Nat	Name	Serie A	Coppa Italia	Total
1	9	FW	(Italy)	Alfredo Donnarumma	4	1	5
1	45	FW	(Italy)	Mario Balotelli	5	0	5
3	11	FW	(Italy)	Ernesto Torregrossa	4	0	4
4	14	DF	(Venezuela)	Jhon Chancellor	3	0	3
5	4	MF	(Italy)	Sandro Tonali	1	0	1
5	7	MF	(Slovakia)	Nikolas Špalek	1	0	1
5	15	DF	(Italy)	Andrea Cistana	1	0	1
5	25	MF	(Italy)	Dimitri Bisoli	1	0	1
5	28	MF	(Italy)	Rômulo	1	0	1
Own goal					1	0	1
Totals					21	1	22

Last updated: 22 February 2020

=== Clean sheets ===
Rank	No.	Pos	Nat	Name	Serie A	Coppa Italia	Total
1	1	GK	(Finland)	Jesse Joronen	4	0	4
2	22	GK	(Italy)	Enrico Alfonso	1	0	1
Totals					5	0	5

Last updated: 9 February 2020

=== Disciplinary record ===
No.	Pos	Nat	Name	Serie A			Coppa Italia			Total		
No.	Pos	Nat	Name	Booked	(yellow card) (yellow-red card)	Sent off (straight red)	Booked	(yellow card) (yellow-red card)	Sent off (straight red)	Booked	(yellow card) (yellow-red card)	Sent off (straight red)
1	GK	(Finland)	Jesse Joronen	1	0	0	0	0	0	1	0	0
12	GK	(Italy)	Lorenzo Andrenacci	0	0	0	0	0	0	0	0	0
22	GK	(Italy)	Enrico Alfonso	0	0	0	0	0	0	0	0	0
2	DF	(Italy)	Stefano Sabelli	2	0	0	0	0	0	2	0	0
3	DF	(Czech Republic)	Aleš Matějů	4	1	0	0	0	0	4	1	0
14	DF	(Venezuela)	Jhon Chancellor	3	0	0	0	0	0	3	0	0
15	DF	(Italy)	Andrea Cistana	7	0	1	0	0	0	7	0	1
20	DF	(Italy)	Giangiacomo Magnani	2	0	0	0	0	0	2	0	0
26	DF	(Italy)	Bruno Martella	1	0	0	0	0	0	1	0	0
4	MF	(Italy)	Sandro Tonali	6	0	0	0	0	0	6	0	0
6	MF	(Albania)	Emanuele Ndoj	2	0	0	0	0	0	2	0	0
7	MF	(Slovakia)	Nikolas Špalek	2	0	0	0	0	0	2	0	0
19	MF	(Italy)	Massimiliano Mangraviti	2	0	0	0	0	0	2	0	0
23	MF	(Finland)	Simon Skrabb	1	0	0	0	0	0	1	0	0
25	MF	(Italy)	Dimitri Bisoli	5	0	0	1	0	0	6	0	0
27	MF	(Italy)	Daniele Dessena	2	1	0	0	0	0	2	1	0
28	MF	(Italy)	Rômulo	3	0	0	0	0	0	3	0	0
9	FW	(Italy)	Alfredo Donnarumma	0	0	0	0	0	0	0	0	0
11	FW	(Italy)	Ernesto Torregrossa	5	0	0	0	0	0	5	0	0
18	FW	(France)	Florian Ayé	2	0	0	0	0	0	2	0	0
21	FW	(Italy)	Alessandro Matri	1	0	1	0	0	0	1	0	1
45	FW	(Italy)	Mario Balotelli	5	0	1	0	0	0	5	0	1
Totals				56	2	3	1	0	0	57	2	3

Last updated: 9 February 2020
