= 2020–21 Brescia Calcio season =

Brescia Calcio
2020–21 season
- Owner: Massimo Cellino
- President: Massimo Cellino
- Head coach: Diego López (until 20 August); Luigi Delneri (from 4 September to 6 October); Diego López (from 6 October to 7 December); Daniele Gastaldello (caretaker, from 7 December until 10 December); Davide Dionigi (from 10 December to 3 February); Pep Clotet (from 5 February)
- Stadium: Stadio Mario Rigamonti
- Serie B: 7th
- Coppa Italia: Third round
- Top goalscorer: League: Florian Ayé (16); All: Florian Ayé (17)
Home colours	Away colours	Third colours
- All statistics correct as of 10 May 2021.

The 2020–21 season was the 110th season in the existence of Brescia Calcio and the club's first season back in the second division of Italian football. In addition to the domestic league, Brescia participated in this season's edition of the Coppa Italia.

== Players ==
=== First-team squad ===
As of 1 February 2021

Note: Flags indicate national team as defined under FIFA eligibility rules; some limited exceptions apply. Players may hold more than one non-FIFA nationality.

No.	Pos.	Nation	Player
1	GK	FIN	Jesse Joronen
2	DF	AUS	Fran Karačić
3	DF	CZE	Aleš Matějů
4	DF	VEN	Jhon Chancellor
5	MF	NED	Tom van de Looi
6	MF	ALB	Emanuele Ndoj
7	FW	SVK	Nikolas Špalek
9	FW	ITA	Alfredo Donnarumma
12	GK	SLO	Matic Kotnik
14	MF	ITA	Massimiliano Mangraviti
15	DF	ITA	Andrea Cistana
16	DF	ITA	Andrea Ghezzi
18	MF	FIN	Simon Skrabb
19	DF	ITA	Alessandro Semprini

No.	Pos.	Nation	Player
20	FW	FRA	Florian Ayé
21	MF	POL	Jakub Łabojko
23	MF	ITA	Antonino Ragusa (on loan from Verona)
24	MF	POL	Filip Jagiełło (on loan from Genoa)
25	MF	ITA	Dimitri Bisoli (Captain)
26	DF	ITA	Bruno Martella
28	DF	ITA	Nicolò Verzeni
29	MF	CRO	Marko Pajač
30	FW	ISL	Hólmbert Friðjónsson
31	MF	ISL	Birkir Bjarnason
32	DF	ITA	Andrea Papetti
33	GK	ITA	Lorenzo Andrenacci
—	FW	SRB	Nikola Ninković
—	FW	ITA	Luca Pandolfi (on loan from Turris)

=== Other players under contract ===
Note: Flags indicate national team as defined under FIFA eligibility rules; some limited exceptions apply. Players may hold more than one non-FIFA nationality.

No.	Pos.	Nation	Player
—	DF	ITA	Giorgio Licini

=== Out on loan ===
Note: Flags indicate national team as defined under FIFA eligibility rules; some limited exceptions apply. Players may hold more than one non-FIFA nationality.

No.	Pos.	Nation	Player
—	GK	ITA	Stefano Filigheddu (on loan to Franciacorta until 30 June 2021)
—	DF	ITA	Mattia Capoferri (on loan to Lecco until 30 June 2021)
—	MF	ITA	Simone Ferrari (on loan to Pergolettese until 30 June 2021)
—	MF	CZE	Jaromír Zmrhal (on loan to Mladá Boleslav until 30 June 2021)

No.	Pos.	Nation	Player
—	MF	ITA	Sandro Tonali (on loan to Milan until 30 June 2021)
—	FW	ITA	Ernesto Torregrossa (on loan to Sampdoria until 30 June 2021, obligation to buy)
—	FW	ITA	Francesco Ruocco (on loan to Giana Erminio until 30 June 2021)

== Pre-season and friendlies ==
Win Draw Loss

12 September 2020 Friendly	Milan (Italy)	3–1	(Italy) Brescia	Carnago, Italy
17:00 CEST (UTC+2)	Kessié 40'; Colombo 49'; Castillejo 61'		Ghezzi 74'	Stadium: Milanello; Attendance: 0 Referee: Kevin Bonacina

== Competitions ==
=== Overall record ===
Competition	First match	Last match	Starting round	Final position	Record							
Competition	First match	Last match	Starting round	Final position	Pld	W	D	L	GF	GA	GD	Win %
Serie B	26 September 2020	10 May 2021	Matchday 1	7th	38	15	11	12	61	53	+8	39.47
Serie B promotion play-offs	13 May 2021		Preliminary round	Preliminary round	1	0	0	1	0	1	−1	0.00
Coppa Italia	30 September 2020	25 November 2020	Second round	Fourth round	3	2	0	1	6	3	+3	66.67
Total					42	17	11	14	67	57	+10	40.48

Source: Soccerway

=== Serie B ===
==== League table ====
Pos	Team	Pld	W	D	L	GF	GA	GD	Pts	Promotion, qualification or relegation
5	Venezia (O, P)	38	15	14	9	53	39	+14	59	Qualification for promotion play-offs preliminary round
6	Cittadella	38	15	12	11	48	35	+13	57	Qualification for promotion play-offs preliminary round
7	Brescia	38	15	11	12	61	53	+8	56 (Note: Head-to-head points: Brescia 9, Chievo 5, SPAL 2.)	Qualification for promotion play-offs preliminary round
8	Chievo (D, R)	38	14	14	10	50	37	+13	56	Bankruptcy
9	SPAL	38	14	14	10	44	42	+2	56	

Source: Lega Serie B (in Italian), Soccerway (in English)
Rules for classification: 1) Points; 2) Head-to-head points; 3) Head-to-head goal difference; 4) Goal difference; 5) Goals scored; 6) Draw.
(D) Disqualified; (O) Play-off winners; (P) Promoted; (R) Relegated

==== Results summary ====
Overall								Home						Away					
Pld	W	D	L	GF	GA	GD	Pts	W	D	L	GF	GA	GD	W	D	L	GF	GA	GD
38	15	11	12	61	53	+8	56	9	5	5	36	27	+9	6	6	7	25	26	−1

Source: Serie B

==== Results by round ====
Round	1	2	3	4	5	6	7	8	9	10	11	12	13	14	15	16	17	18	19	20	21	22	23	24	25	26	27	28	29	30	31	32	33	34	35	36	37	38
Ground	H	A	H	A	A	H	A	H	H	A	H	A	H	A	H	A	H	A	H	A	H	A	H	H	A	H	A	A	H	A	H	A	H	A	H	A	H	A
Result	D	L	W	L	D	D	W	D	L	L	W	D	W	D	L	W	L	L	L	L	D	D	W	L	D	W	W	W	W	L	W	D	D	L	W	W	W	W
Position	7	20	7	11	12	12	10	10	11	12	11	11	10	10	11	11	11	13	13	13	13	14	13	16	16	14	14	12	10	10	9	9	9	10	10	8	8	7

Source: Serie B
A = Away; H = Home; W = Win; D = Draw; L = Loss

==== Matches ====
The league fixtures were announced on 9 September 2020.

26 September 2020 1	Brescia	1–1	Ascoli	Brescia
CEST (UTC+2)				Stadium: Stadio Mario Rigamonti

4 October 2020 2	Cittadella	3–0	Brescia	Cittadella
CEST (UTC+2)				Stadium: Stadio Pier Cesare Tombolato

16 October 2020 3	Brescia	3–0	Lecce	Brescia
CEST (UTC+2)				Stadium: Stadio Mario Rigamonti

20 October 2020 4	Chievo	1–0	Brescia	Verona
CEST (UTC+2)				Stadium: Stadio Marcantonio Bentegodi

31 October 2020 6	Brescia	2–2	Virtus Entella	Brescia
CEST (UTC+2)				Stadium: Stadio Mario Rigamonti

7 November 2020 7	Cosenza	1–2	Brescia	Cosenza
CEST (UTC+2)				Stadium: Stadio San Vito-Gigi Marulla

21 November 2020 8	Brescia	2–2	Venezia	Brescia
CEST (UTC+2)				Stadium: Stadio Mario Rigamonti

28 November 2020 9	Brescia	1–2	Frosinone	Brescia
CEST (UTC+2)				Stadium: Stadio Mario Rigamonti

5 December 2020 10	Reggina	2–1	Brescia
CEST (UTC+2)

8 December 2020 5	Cremonese	2–2	Brescia
CEST (UTC+2)

12 December 2020 11	Brescia	3–1	Salernitana	Brescia
CEST (UTC+2)				Stadium: Stadio Mario Rigamonti

15 December 2020 12	Pordenone	1–1	Brescia
CEST (UTC+2)

19 December 2020 13	Brescia	3–1	Reggiana	Brescia
CEST (UTC+2)				Stadium: Stadio Mario Rigamonti

22 December 2020 14	Pescara	1–1	Brescia
CEST (UTC+2)

27 December 2020 15	Brescia	1–3	Empoli	Brescia
CEST (UTC+2)				Stadium: Stadio Mario Rigamonti

30 December 2020 16	SPAL	2–3	Brescia
CEST (UTC+2)

4 January 2021 17	Brescia	0–3	Vicenza	Brescia
CEST (UTC+2)				Stadium: Stadio Mario Rigamonti

16 January 2021 18	Pisa	1–0	Brescia
CEST (UTC+2)

25 January 2021 19	Brescia	0–1	Monza	Brescia
CEST (UTC+2)				Stadium: Stadio Mario Rigamonti

30 January 2021 20	Ascoli	2–1	Brescia
CEST (UTC+2)

6 February 2021 21	Brescia	3–3	Cittadella	Brescia
CEST (UTC+2)				Stadium: Stadio Mario Rigamonti

9 February 2021 22	Lecce	2–2	Brescia
CEST (UTC+2)

14 February 2021 23	Brescia	1–0	Chievo	Brescia
CEST (UTC+2)				Stadium: Stadio Mario Rigamonti

20 February 2021 24	Brescia	1–2	Cremonese	Brescia
CEST (UTC+2)				Stadium: Stadio Mario Rigamonti

27 February 2021 25	Virtus Entella	1–1	Brescia
CEST (UTC+2)

2 March 2021 26	Brescia	2–0	Cosenza	Brescia
CEST (UTC+2)				Stadium: Stadio Mario Rigamonti

6 March 2021 27	Venezia	0–1	Brescia
CEST (UTC+2)

13 March 2021 28	Frosinone	0–1	Brescia
CEST (UTC+2)

16 March 2021 29	Brescia	1–0	Reggina	Brescia
CEST (UTC+2)				Stadium: Stadio Mario Rigamonti

21 March 2021 30	Salernitana	1–0	Brescia
CEST (UTC+2)

2 April 2021 31	Brescia	4–1	Pordenone	Brescia
CEST (UTC+2)				Stadium: Stadio Mario Rigamonti

5 April 2021 32	Reggiana	2–2	Brescia
CEST (UTC+2)

10 April 2021 33	Brescia	1–1	Pescara	Brescia
CEST (UTC+2)				Stadium: Stadio Mario Rigamonti

17 April 2021 34	Empoli	4–2	Brescia
CEST (UTC+2)

1 May 2021 35	Brescia	3–1	SPAL	Brescia
CEST (UTC+2)				Stadium: Stadio Mario Rigamonti

4 May 2021 36	Vicenza	0–3	Brescia	Vicenza
CEST (UTC+2)				Stadium: Stadio Romeo Menti

7 May 2021 37	Brescia	4–3	Pisa	Brescia
CEST (UTC+2)				Stadium: Stadio Mario Rigamonti

10 May 2021 38	Monza	0–2	Brescia	Monza
CEST (UTC+2)				Stadium: Stadio Brianteo

==== Promotion play-offs ====
13 May 2021 Preliminary round	Cittadella	1–0	Brescia	Cittadella
18:00 CEST (UTC+2)	Proia 40'			Stadium: Pier Cesare Tombolato; Referee: Ivano Pezzuto

=== Coppa Italia ===
30 September 2020 First round	Brescia	3–0	Trapani	Brescia
20:00 CEST (UTC+2)		Report		Stadium: Stadio Mario Rigamonti; Referee: Lorenzo Illuzzi
Note: Trapani withdrew from the match.

28 October 2020 Third round	Brescia	3–0	Perugia	Brescia
16:00 CET (UTC+1)	Bisoli 10'; Ayé 25' (pen.); Mangraviti 71'	Report		Stadium: Stadio Mario Rigamonti; Referee: Ivan Robilotta

25 November 2020 Fourth round	Empoli	3–0	Brescia	Empoli
14:30 CET (UTC+1)		Report		Stadium: Stadio Carlo Castellani; Referee: Nicola Ayroldi
Note: Brescia withdrew from the match to prevent an outbreak after several of their players tested positive for COVID-19.
