= Bisoli =

Bisoli is an Italian surname. Notable people with the surname include:

- Dimitri Bisoli (born 1994), Italian footballer
- Pierpaolo Bisoli (born 1966), Italian footballer and manager
