= Rômulo (footballer, born 1987) =

Italian-Brazilian footballer

Personal information
- Full name: Rômulo Souza Orestes Caldeira
- Date of birth: 22 May 1987 (age 39)
- Place of birth: Pelotas, Brazil
- Height: 1.78 m (5 ft 10 in)
- Positions: Midfielder; right-back

Youth career
- 2002–2006: Caxias

Senior career*
Years	Team	Apps	(Gls)
2006–2007	Juventude	20	(1)
2007–2008	Metropolitano	25	(0)
2008–2009	Chapecoense	27	(3)
2009–2010	Santo André	23	(1)
2010–2011	Cruzeiro	16	(1)
2011	→ Atlético Paranaense (loan)	5	(0)
2011–2014	Fiorentina	30	(2)
2013–2014	→ Hellas Verona (loan)	32	(6)
2014–2018	Hellas Verona	85	(7)
2014–2015	→ Juventus (loan)	4	(0)
2018–2020	Genoa	18	(1)
2019	→ Lazio (loan)	10	(0)
2019–2020	→ Brescia (loan)	22	(1)
2021–2022	Cruzeiro	57	(1)
Total		374	(27)
- * Club domestic league appearances and goals as of 6 November 2022

Rômulo Souza Orestes Caldeira (born 22 May 1987), commonly known as Rômulo, is an Italian-Brazilian footballer who plays as a midfielder or right back.

== Club career ==
=== Early career ===
Born in Pelotas, Brazil, Rômulo began his professional footballing career within the youth ranks of Caxias in 2002. Having remained within the club's youth academy until 2006, Rômulo then transferred to Juventude, where he made his professional debut. Over the course of one year with the club, he appeared in 20 league matches and scored one goal. The following year, Rômulo was sold to fellow Brazilian side Metropolitano, spending the 2007 and 2008 season with the club before signing with Chapecoense in 2008. After yet another one–year spell, Rômulo signed with Santo André in 2009, before adding to and continuing his status as a journeyman by signing with Cruzeiro in July 2010.

=== Cruzeiro ===
On 10 July 2010, Rômulo was officially presented as a reinforcement of Cruzeiro. He made his debut for the Brazilian giants on July 22, in a match against Fluminense. He went on to make 16 appearances for the club that season, scoring one goal. After less than one full calendar year, however, he was sent on loan to Atlético Paranaense.

On 13 April 2011, Rômulo officially joined Atlético Paranaense on loan from Cruzeiro, making just 6 appearances. He returned to Cruzeiro upon the conclusion of the loan agreement, and was soon thereafter sold to Italian Serie A side Fiorentina.

=== Fiorentina ===
On 29 June 2011, Rômulo officially joined Fiorentina following the agreement of a permanent transfer from Cruzeiro. He made his debut for La Viola on 21 September 2011, in a 3–0 home victory over Parma. During his first season with the club, Rômulo appeared in just 10 league matches, and started in only 4 of them. During his second season in Serie A, he managed to appear in 20 league fixtures (10 starts), and scored two goals. Despite the improved amount of playing time in his second season, Rômulo was sent out on loan to newly promoted Serie A club Hellas Verona in August 2013, with an option for his new club to acquire 50% of his transfer rights at the end of the 2013–14 Serie A season.

=== Hellas Verona ===
Rômulo officially transferred to the northern-Italian side on 13 August 2013, and made his official debut on 24 August in an unexpected 2–1 victory over A.C. Milan at the Stadio Marc'Antonio Bentegodi in what was Verona's first Serie A match since 2002. He went on to become an integral part of the club's starting line-up under coach Andrea Mandorlini as the Scaglieri finished 10th in the league table, nearly qualifying for the UEFA Europa League. He appeared in 32 league matches and scored 6 goals. Verona exercised their option to sign 50% of the player's contractual rights upon the conclusion of the season.

On 14 July 2014, Verona acquired full ownership of Rômulo.

=== Juventus ===
On 2 August 2014, Rômulo officially signed for Juventus, on a year-long loan from Hellas Verona for €1m with an option for an outright buy for €6m. The deal means a buy-out clause becomes mandatory if Romulo plays “at least 60 per cent of Juventus' official games in the 2014–15 season”. The official statement notes the overall fixed value of the deal to be €6m – to be paid over three years – with a possible €1m in certain performance-based add-ons.

He made his debut in the 2–0 UEFA Champions League group stage win over Malmö FF on 16 September, replacing Stephan Lichtsteiner in added time. Four days later he made his first Serie A appearance for the club, replacing the same player for the final seven minutes of a 1–0 win at A.C. Milan. Rômulo was sidelined for the rest of the first part of the season, however, due to continual problems with his adductor muscles, as well as athletic pubalgia; he was operated in December, which kept him out for three months. He returned to the pitch on 9 May 2015, in a 1–1 home draw against Cagliari; however, during Juventus's 2–1 away win over Inter on 16 May, he suffered a myotendinous tear of the rectus femoris muscle in his left thigh, which kept him out for the rest of the season, as Juventus won a domestic Serie A and Coppa Italia double, also reaching the 2015 UEFA Champions League Final. At the end of the season, Juventus chose not to renew his loan contract, resulting in his return to Verona.

=== Genoa ===
On 11 July 2018, Rômulo signed a contract with Serie A side Genoa.

==== Lazio (loan) ====
On 31 January 2019, Rômulo joined Lazio on loan with an option to buy.

==== Brescia (loan) ====
On 2 September 2019, on the last day of the summer transfer window, Rômulo joined newly promoted club Brescia on a single-season loan. He made his club debut on 15 September, setting up a goal for Alfredo Donnarumma in a 4–3 home loss to Bologna. On 21 September, he scored his first goal for the club in a 1–0 away win over Udinese.

== International career ==
An Italian citizen through ancestry, Rômulo was first called up by Italy national football team coach Cesare Prandelli in April 2014 for a stage, due to his impressive performances with Verona. On 13 May 2014, Rômulo's name was included in a provisional 30-man squad for the upcoming 2014 FIFA World Cup, but on 1 June 2014, he was omitted from the final 23-man squad for the tournament on 1 June; Rômulo later stated on 2 June that although he had originally been included in Prandelli's final 23-man squad, he turned down the call-up, as he felt he felt he was not quite 100% in terms of his physical condition, and therefore preferred to offer his spot in the team to other players who were in better shape than him.

== Style of play ==
A box-to-box player, Rômulo is a tactically versatile footballer, who is capable of aiding his team both offensively and defensively. He is capable of playing anywhere in midfield, both in the centre, or on either wing, or even as an attacking midfielder. He has also been used as a full-back or wing-back on the right flank.

== Career statistics ==
As of match played 24 September 2019

Club	Season	League		Cup		Europe		Total	
Club	Season	Apps	Goals	Apps	Goals	Apps	Goals	Apps	Goals
Caxias	2007	?	?	?	?	–		?	?
Caxias	Total	?	?	?	?	–		?	?
Juventude	2007	20	1	?	?	–		20	1
Juventude	Total	20	1	?	?	–		20	1
Metropolitano	2008	25	0	?	?	–		25	0
Metropolitano	Total	25	0	?	?	–		25	0
Chapecoense	2009	27	3	?	?	–		27	3
Chapecoense	Total	27	3	?	?	–		27	3
Santo André	2009	22	1	0	0	–		22	1
Santo André	2010	1	0	0	0	–		1	0
Santo André	Total	23	1	0	0	–		23	1
Cruzeiro	2010	16	1	0	0	–		16	1
Cruzeiro	Total	16	1	0	0	–		16	1
Atlético Paranaense (loan)	2011	5	0	0	0	–		5	0
Atlético Paranaense (loan)	Total	5	0	0	0	–		5	0
Fiorentina	2011–12	10	0	0	0	–		10	0
Fiorentina	2012–13	20	2	4	0	–		24	2
Fiorentina	Total	30	2	4	0	–		34	2
Verona (loan)	2013–14	32	6	1	0	–		33	6
Verona (loan)	Total	32	6	1	0	–		33	6
Juventus (loan)	2014–15	4	0	0	0	1	0	5	0
Juventus (loan)	Total	4	0	0	0	1	0	5	0
Verona	2015–16	9	0	1	0	–		10	0
Verona	2016–17	39	4	2	0	–		41	4
Verona	2017–18	37	3	3	0	–		40	3
Verona	Total	85	7	6	0	–		91	7
Genoa	2018–19	17	1	2	0	–		19	1
Lazio (loan)	2018–19	10	0	2	0	1	0	13	0
Genoa	2019–20	1	0	1	0	–		2	0
Genoa	Total	18	1	3	0	0	0	21	1
Brescia (loan)	2019–20	3	1	0	0	–		3	1
Career Total		298+	23+	16+	0+	2	0	317+	23+

== Honours ==
=== Club ===
Juventus

- Serie A: 2014–15
- Coppa Italia: 2014–15

Lazio

- Coppa Italia: 2018–19
