= Andrea Cistana =

Association football player (born 1997)

Personal information
- Date of birth: 1 April 1997 (age 29)
- Place of birth: Brescia, Italy
- Height: 1.87 m (6 ft 2 in)
- Position: Defender

Youth career
- Brescia

Senior career*
Years	Team	Apps	(Gls)
2014–2025	Brescia	162	(9)
2016–2017	→ Ciliverghe Mazzano (loan)	28	(1)
2018	→ Prato (loan)	10	(0)
2025–2026	Spezia	7	(0)
2026	→ Bari (loan)	17	(0)
- * Club domestic league appearances and goals as of 12 May 2026

Andrea Cistana (born 1 April 1997) is an Italian footballer who plays as a defender.

== Club career ==
He is a product of Brescia youth teams, and started playing for their Under-19 squad in the 2014–15 season. He also made some bench appearances in the 2014–15 Serie B, but did not see any time on the field.

For 2016–17 season, he went on loan to Serie D club Ciliverghe Mazzano.

On 31 January 2018, he joined Serie C club Prato on loan until the end of the season. He made his Serie C debut for Prato on 18 February 2018 in a game against Carrarese as a 54th-minute substitute for Daniele Ghidotti.

After his return from loan, he extended his contract with Brescia to 2021 on 10 September 2018. He made his Serie B debut for Brescia 5 days later in a game against Pescara, as a starter.

On 31 July 2025, Cistana signed a two-season contract with Spezia. On 4 January 2026, he was loaned by Bari. Upon his return from loan, his Spezia contract was mutually terminated.

== International career ==
Cistana was called up to the senior Italy squad by Roberto Mancini in November 2019.

== Career statistics ==
As of match played 21 March 2021

Club	Season	League	League		Cup		Europe		Other		Total	
Club	Season	League	Apps	Goals	Apps	Goals	Apps	Goals	Apps	Goals	Apps	Goals
Ciliverghe Mazzano (loan)	2016–17	Serie D	28	1	–		–		–		28	1
Prato (loan)	2017–18	Serie C	10	0	–		–		–		10	0
Brescia	2018–19	Serie B	30	0	0	0	–		–		30	0
Brescia	2019–20	Serie A	21	1	0	0	–		–		21	1
Brescia	2020–21	Serie B	6	0	0	0	–		–		6	0
Brescia	Total		57	1	0	0	–		–		57	1
Career total			95	2	0	0	0	0	0	0	95	2
