= Jaromír Zmrhal =

Czech footballer (born 1993)

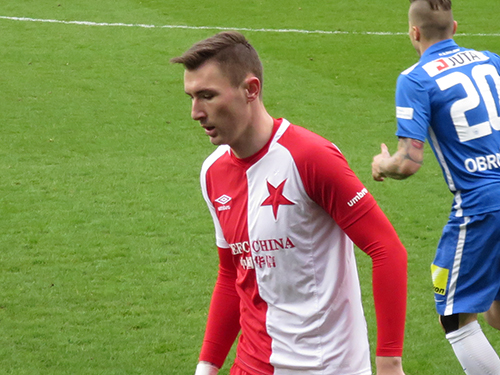
- Zmrhal with Slavia Prague

Personal information
- Date of birth: 2 August 1993 (age 33)
- Place of birth: Žatec, Czech Republic
- Height: 1.89 m (6 ft 2 in)
- Position: Left winger

Team information
- Current team: Zbrojovka Brno

Youth career
- 2004–2012: Slavia Prague

Senior career*
Years	Team	Apps	(Gls)
2012–2019	Slavia Prague	187	(26)
2019–2021	Brescia	28	(2)
2021	→ Mladá Boleslav (loan)	18	(4)
2021–2024	Slovan Bratislava	81	(13)
2024–2026	Apollon Limassol	55	(3)
2026–	Zbrojovka Brno	0	(0)

International career^{‡}
2013	Czech Republic U20	1	(0)
2012–2015	Czech Republic U21	20	(1)
2016–2023	Czech Republic	23	(1)
- * Club domestic league appearances and goals as of 13:09, 1 June 2026 (UTC) ‡ National team caps and goals as of 20 June 2023

Jaromír Zmrhal (born 2 August 1993) is a Czech professional footballer who plays as a midfielder for Zbrojovka Brno and the Czech Republic national team. He can play as a central midfielder or left winger.

== Club career ==
=== Slavia Prague ===
Jaromír Zmrhal broke into the Slavia Prague first team in 2012, making his league debut on 4 August in a 2–2 Czech First League away draw against Baník Ostrava. He scored his first league goal three weeks later in a 5–0 home win against FC Zbrojovka Brno. He then went on to appear in 83 out of 90 league matches over the next three seasons, scoring five goals. In the 2015–16 season, he scored the winning goal in the Slavia - Sparta derby on 27 September 2015 with a powerful long-range effort.

On 9 May 2018, he played as Slavia Prague won the 2017–18 Czech Cup final against Jablonec.

=== Brescia and Loan to Mladá Boleslav ===
On 6 August 2019, Zmrhal signed a four-year contract with Italian club Brescia. The transfer fee was reported to be €3.75m.

On 1 February 2021, Zmrhal moved to Czech club Mladá Boleslav, on a loan deal until the end of the season.

=== Apollon Limassol ===
On 4 July 2024, Zmrhal signed a contract with Cypriot club Apollon Limassol until May 2026.

=== Zbrojovka Brno ===
On 5 June 2026, Zmrhal signed a multi-year contract with Czech club Zbrojovka Brno.

== International career ==
Zmrhal got his first call up to the senior Czech Republic side for 2018 FIFA World Cup qualifiers against Germany and Azerbaijan in October 2016, debuting against the latter on 11 October.

He scored his first goal in his second appearance, a 2–1 home victory against Norway in the World Cup qualification round.

== Career statistics ==
=== Club ===
As of match played 5 July 2024

Appearances and goals by club, season and competition
Club	Season	League			Cup		Continental		Other		Total	
Club	Season	Division	Apps	Goals	Apps	Goals	Apps	Goals	Apps	Goals	Apps	Goals
Slavia Prague	2012–13	Czech First League	28	1	0	0	—		—		28	1
Slavia Prague	2013–14	Czech First League	29	0	4	0	—		—		33	0
Slavia Prague	2014–15	Czech First League	26	4	1	0	—		—		27	4
Slavia Prague	2015–16	Czech First League	27	4	2	2	—		—		29	6
Slavia Prague	2016–17	Czech First League	30	7	4	0	5	0	—		39	7
Slavia Prague	2017–18	Czech First League	21	5	3	0	8	0	—		32	5
Slavia Prague	2018–19	Czech First League	23	4	1	0	14	2	—		38	6
Slavia Prague	2019–20	Czech First League	3	1	—		—		1	0	4	1
Slavia Prague	Total		187	26	15	2	27	2	1	0	230	30
Brescia	2019–20	Serie A	21	2	1	0	—		—		22	2
Brescia	2020–21	Serie B	7	0	—		—		—		7	0
Brescia	Total		28	2	1	0	—		—		29	2
Mladá Boleslav (loan)	2020–21	Czech First League	18	4	2	1	—		—		20	5
Slovan Bratislava	2021–22	Slovak Super Liga	28	8	5	1	14	2	—		47	11
Slovan Bratislava	2022–23	Slovak Super Liga	25	2	7	1	12	0	—		44	3
Slovan Bratislava	2023–24	Slovak Super Liga	28	3	4	1	10	0	—		42	4
Slovan Bratislava	Total		91	13	16	3	36	2	0	0	133	18
Career total			314	45	44	6	63	4	1	0	412	55

=== International ===
As of match played 11 November 2016. Czech Republic score listed first, score column indicates score after each Zmrhal goal.

International goals by date, venue, cap, opponent, score, result and competition
No.	Date	Venue	Cap	Opponent	Score	Result	Competition
1	11 November 2016	Eden Arena, Prague, Czech Republic	2	Norway	2–0	2–1	2018 FIFA World Cup qualifying

== Honours ==
Slavia Prague

- Czech Cup: 2017–18

Slovan Bratislava

- Fortuna Liga: 2021–22, 2022–23
