= Jesse Joronen =

Finnish footballer (born 1993)

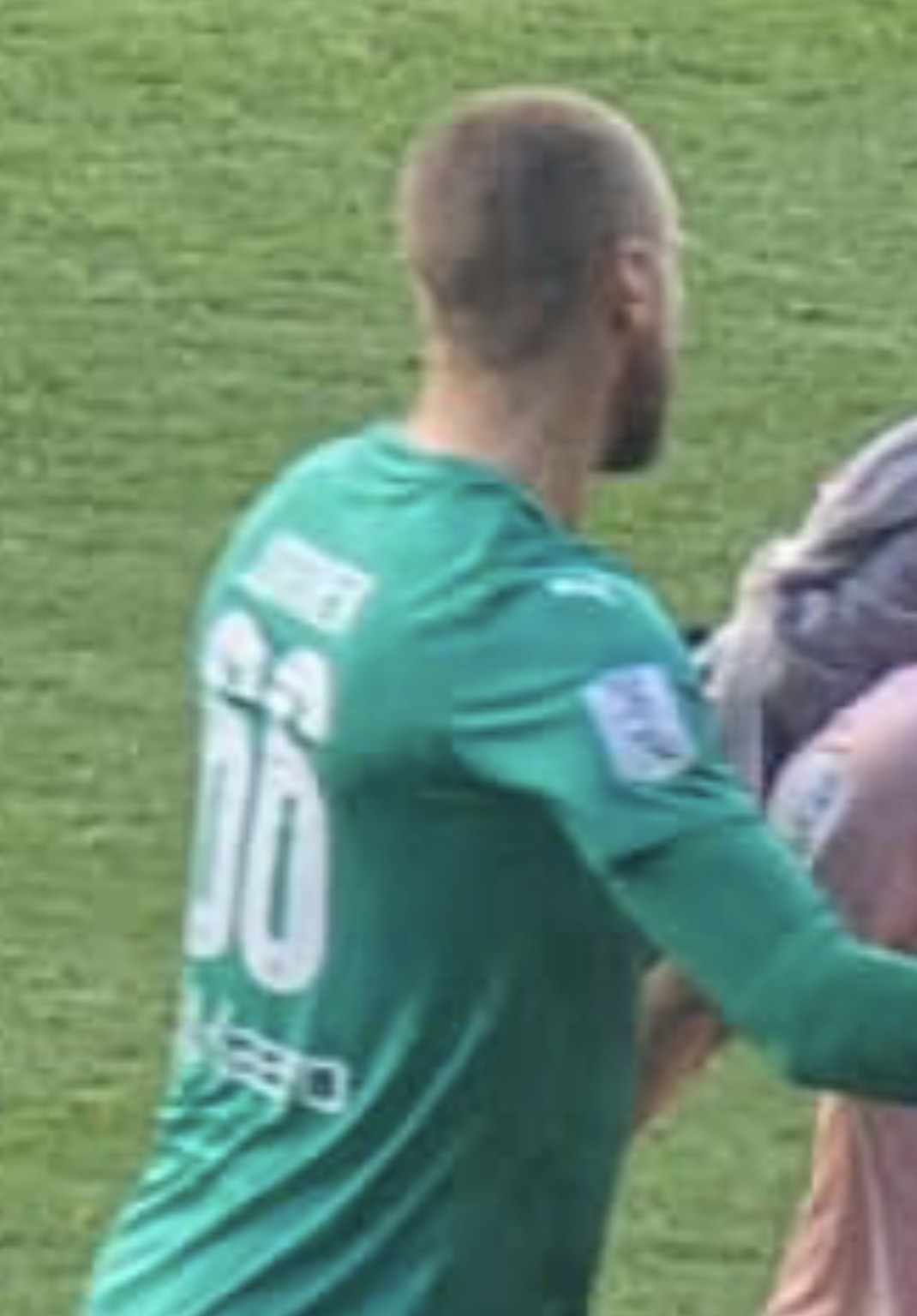
- Joronen with Palermo in 2026

Personal information
- Full name: Jesse Pekka Joronen
- Date of birth: 21 March 1993 (age 33)
- Place of birth: Rautjärvi, Finland
- Height: 1.97 m (6 ft 6 in)
- Position: Goalkeeper

Team information
- Current team: Palermo
- Number: 66

Youth career
- –2009: Simpeleen Urheilijat
- 2009–2012: Fulham

Senior career*
Years	Team	Apps	(Gls)
2012–2017	Fulham	4	(0)
2012–2013	→ Maidenhead United (loan)	8	(0)
2013	→ Cambridge United (loan)	0	(0)
2013	→ Lahti (loan)	18	(0)
2014	→ Accrington Stanley (loan)	4	(0)
2015–2016	→ Stevenage (loan)	10	(1)
2017–2018	AC Horsens	28	(0)
2018–2019	Copenhagen	37	(0)
2019–2022	Brescia	103	(0)
2022–2025	Venezia	71	(0)
2025–	Palermo	35	(0)

International career^{‡}
2009	Finland U16	1	(0)
2009	Finland U17	6	(0)
2010	Finland U19	1	(0)
2011–2014	Finland U21	11	(0)
2013–2026	Finland	23	(0)
- * Club domestic league appearances and goals as of 12 May 2026 ‡ National team caps and goals as of 5 June 2026

Jesse Pekka Joronen (born 21 March 1993) is a Finnish professional footballer who plays as a goalkeeper for Serie B club Palermo. He made his senior debut for Finland in 2013.

== Club career ==
=== Fulham ===
Born and raised in the small town of Simpele, Rautjärvi located near the Russian border, Joronen joined Fulham Academy in 2009. In June 2010, Joronen signed his first professional contract with the club, which would keep him there until 2013.

In May 2012, Joronen signed a two-year extension with Fulham that would keep him with the club until 2014. Five months later, on 25 October 2012, Joronen joined Maidenhead United on loan and in February 2013, Joronen was loaned to Cambridge United. Only a day later, Joronen returned to Fulham after he refused to be named as a substitute for Cambridge.

After a loan spell at Maidenhead United, Joronen then moved back to Finland, where he joined Veikkausliiga side FC Lahti on loan until August. After making eighteen appearances for the club, where he established himself as a first-choice goalkeeper, Joronen returned to his parent club in early August.

At the start of the 2014–15 season, Joronen signed a two-year contract with the club that kept him until 2016. He was then given his debut as the starting goalkeeper in Fulham's opening game in the Championship against Ipswich Town on 9 August 2014. After making three more appearances for the club, Joronen soon lost his first-team place to Marcus Bettinelli and new goalkeeper signing Gábor Király.

Joronen joined Accrington Stanley on loan for one month on 17 October 2014. He made his Accrington Stanley debut the next day, starting in goal, in a 2–1 loss against Stevenage. However, after making three more appearances at Accrington Stanley whilst on loan, he returned early after dislocating his kneecap during a League Two match against Morecambe. Then, it was announced that Joronen would be out for three to four months.

On 27 August 2015, Joronen signed for Stevenage on loan until January 2016. He made his Stevenage debut two days later, in a 1–1 draw against Dagenham & Redbridge. Joronen scored with a long-range clearance in a match against Wycombe Wanderers on 17 October 2015. He then kept his first clean sheet in a 3–0 win over Gillingham in the first round of the FA Cup. However, after making eleven appearances for the side, Joronen suffered an injury during the match against Gillingham and subsequently returned to his parent club. After returning to his parent club, Joronen signed a contract extension, keeping him there until 2017.

In the 2016–17 season, Joronen was featured three times in the EFL Cup, being the first-choice goalkeeper ahead of Bettinelli. At the end of the 2016–17 season, he was offered a new contract by the club.

=== AC Horsens ===
However, instead of signing a new contract, Joronen left Fulham to join Danish side AC Horsens, signing a two-year contract on 10 July 2017.

Joronen made his AC Horsens debut in the opening game of the season, in a 2–1 win over AGF Aarhus. On 4 August 2017, he kept his first clean sheet for the side, in a 1–0 win over Silkeborg, a win that saw the club go to the top of the table.

=== FC Copenhagen ===
On 15 December 2017, it was announced that Joronen would join Copenhagen in the summer of 2018 for a fee of €875,000. He signed a five-year contract. He made his competitive debut on 23 July 2018, playing the entirety of a 3–0 Superliga victory over Hobro.

=== Brescia ===
On 11 July 2019, Joronen joined Brescia in Serie A on a permanent deal, after one season with Copenhagen, for a transfer fee of €5 million.

=== Venezia ===
On 30 June 2022, Joronen signed a three-year contract with an option for a fourth year with Venezia in Serie B, for a €1.25 million fee. Joronen suffered a muscle injury in early October 2023 and was ruled out for around two months. He returned to the starting line-up at the end of December 2023. On 2 June 2024, Joronen helped Venezia to win promotion to Serie A via the play-offs, after keeping two clean sheets in two man-of-the-match performances against Cremonese.

=== Palermo ===
On 21 August 2025, after being released from his Venezia contract, Joronen signed for Palermo on a free transfer, reuniting with Finland international teammate Joel Pohjanpalo and his former Brescia coach Filippo Inzaghi.

== International career ==
Having represented Finland at U17, U19 and U21 level, Joronen was called up to the senior squad and made his debut for Finland in the 2013 King's Cup against Thailand on 24 January 2013.

Joronen was called up for the UEFA Euro 2020 pre-tournament friendly match against Sweden on 29 May 2021 and was part of the final 26-man squad.

On 4 June 2026, Joronen announced his retirement from international football. He made his final appearance on 5 June 2026 in a friendly against Hungary.

== Career statistics ==
=== Club ===
As of match played 14 September 2025

Appearances and goals by club, season and competition
Club	Season	League			National cup (Note: Includes FA Cup, Danish Cup and Coppa Italia)		Europe		Other		Total	
Club	Season	Division	Apps	Goals	Apps	Goals	Apps	Goals	Apps	Goals	Apps	Goals
Maidenhead United (loan)	2012–13	National League North	8	0	0	0	–		1 (Note: Appearance(s) in FA Trophy)	0	9	0
Lahti (loan)	2013	Veikkausliiga	18	0	0	0	–		–		18	0
Fulham	2014–15	Championship	4	0	0	0	–		0	0	4	0
Fulham	2015–16	Championship	0	0	0	0	–		0	0	0	0
Fulham	2016–17	Championship	0	0	0	0	–		3 (Note: Includes EFL Cup)	0	3	0
Fulham	Total		4	0	0	0	–		3	0	7	0
Accrington Stanley (loan)	2014–15	League Two	4	0	0	0	–		0	0	4	0
Stevenage (loan)	2015–16	League Two	10	1	1	0	–		0	0	11	1
Horsens	2017–18	Danish Superliga	28	0	0	0	–		–		28	0
Copenhagen	2018–19	Danish Superliga	31	0	1	0	6 (Note: Appearance(s) in UEFA Europa League)	0	–		38	0
Brescia	2019–20	Serie A	29	0	1	0	–		–		30	0
Brescia	2020–21	Serie B	37	0	0	0	–		1 (Note: Appearances in Serie B – Promotion play-offs)	0	38	0
Brescia	2021–22	Serie B	37	0	1	0	–		3	0	41	0
Brescia	Total		103	0	2	0	–		4	0	109	0
Venezia	2022–23	Serie B	34	0	1	0	–		1	0	36	0
Venezia	2023–24	Serie B	29	0	1	0	–		4	0	34	0
Venezia	2024–25	Serie A	8	0	1	0	–		–		9	0
Venezia	Total		71	0	3	0	–		5	0	79	0
Palermo	2025–26	Serie B	2	0	0	0	–		–		2	0
Career total			278	1	7	0	6	0	13	0	304	1

=== International ===
As of match played 5 June 2026

Appearances and goals by national team and year
National team	Year	Apps	Goals
Finland	2013	1	0
Finland	2014	1	0
Finland	2015	0	0
Finland	2016	0	0
Finland	2017	1	0
Finland	2018	3	0
Finland	2019	2	0
Finland	2020	2	0
Finland	2021	4	0
Finland	2022	3	0
Finland	2023	0	0
Finland	2024	3	0
Finland	2025	2	0
Finland	2026	1	0
Total		23	0

== Honours ==
Venezia

- Serie B promotion play-offs: 2023–24

Copenhagen

- Danish Superliga: 2018–19

Finland

- FIFA Series: 2026
