= Ernesto Torregrossa =

Venezuelan footballer (born 1992)

Personal information
- Full name: Ernesto Torregrossa Rezzonico
- Date of birth: 28 June 1992 (age 34)
- Place of birth: Caltanissetta, Italy
- Height: 1.84 m (6 ft 0 in)
- Position: Forward

Team information
- Current team: Lumezzane
- Number: 7

Senior career*
Years	Team	Apps	(Gls)
2010–2013	Verona	6	(0)
2011	→ Siracusa (loan)	6	(0)
2011–2012	→ Monza (loan)	25	(4)
2012–2013	→ Como (loan)	11	(1)
2013	→ Lumezzane (loan)	9	(1)
2013–2014	Lumezzane	28	(13)
2014–2018	Verona	0	(0)
2014–2015	→ Crotone (loan)	35	(8)
2015–2016	→ Trapani (loan)	15	(3)
2016–2018	→ Brescia (loan)	40	(9)
2018–2021	Brescia	83	(30)
2021	→ Sampdoria (loan)	6	(1)
2021–2023	Sampdoria	10	(0)
2022–2023	→ Pisa (loan)	30	(12)
2023–2024	Pisa	29	(3)
2024–2025	Salernitana	11	(0)
2025–2026	Carrarese	32	(4)
2026–	Lumezzane	1	(0)

International career^{‡}
2022–	Venezuela	5	(2)
- * Club domestic league appearances and goals as of 26 September 2026 ‡ National team caps and goals as of 14:14, 20 June 2023 (UTC)

Ernesto Torregrossa Rezzonico (born 28 June 1992) is a professional footballer who plays as a forward for Serie C Group A club Lumezzane. Born in Italy, he plays for the Venezuela national team.

== Early life ==
Torregrossa was born to Venezuelan former footballer Lirio Torregrossa and Argentine former volleyball player Karina Rezzonico, both of them being of Italian descent.

== Club career ==
On 12 January 2021, Torregrossa joined Serie A club Sampdoria. Initially, the transfer was a loan, at the end of which Sampdoria was obligated to purchase his rights. He signed a contract with the club that will run until 30 June 2025.

On 24 January 2022, he moved to Serie B club Pisa on loan with an option to buy and a conditional obligation to buy. On 28 July 2022, Torregrossa returned to Pisa on a new loan with an obligation to buy. On 31 January 2023, Pisa made the transfer permanent.

On 30 August 2024, Torregrossa signed a one-season contract with Salernitana in Serie B.

== International career ==
Due to his family heritage, Torregrossa was eligible to represent Italy, Argentina or Venezuela. By May 2022, he chose the latter. In November 2022 he received his first call for "La Vinotinto".

== Career statistics ==
=== Club ===
As of match played 23 August 2024

Appearances and goals by club, season and competition
Club	Season	League			National cup (Note: Includes Coppa Italia, Coppa Italia Serie C)		Europe		Other		Total	
Club	Season	Division	Apps	Goals	Apps	Goals	Apps	Goals	Apps	Goals	Apps	Goals
Hellas Verona	2010–11	Lega Pro 1	3	0	1	0	—		—		4	0
Siracusa (loan)	2010–11	Lega Pro 1	6	0	0	0	—		—		6	0
Monza (loan)	2011–12	Lega Pro 1	23	4	0	0	—		2 (Note: Appearance(s) in Lega Pro/Serie C play-out)	0	25	4
Como (loan)	2012–13	Lega Pro 1	11	1	2	0	—		—		13	1
Lumezzane (loan)	2012–13	Lega Pro 1	9	1	0	0	—		—		9	1
Lumezzane	2013–14	Lega Pro 1	28	13	2	2	—		—		30	15
Crotone (loan)	2014–15	Serie B	35	8	1	0	—		—		36	8
Trapani (loan)	2015–16	Serie B	15	3	2	0	—		1 (Note: Appearance(s) in Serie B play-off)	0	18	3
Brescia (loan)	2016–17	Serie B	29	5	0	0	—		—		29	5
Brescia	2017–18	Serie B	28	10	2	1	—		—		30	11
Brescia	2018–19	Serie B	29	12	2	1	—		—		31	13
Brescia	2019–20	Serie A	25	7	1	0	—		—		26	7
Brescia	2020–21	Serie B	12	5	0	0	—		—		12	5
Brescia	Total		94	34	5	2	0	0	0	0	99	36
Sampdoria (loan)	2020–21	Serie A	6	1	0	0	—		—		6	1
Sampdoria	2021–22	Serie A	10	0	2	0	—		—		12	0
Pisa (loan)	2021–22	Serie B	17	7	0	0	—		4	1	21	8
Pisa	2022–23	Serie B	24	6	0	0	—		—		24	6
Pisa	2023–24	Serie B	18	2	1	0	—		—		19	2
Pisa	Total		42	8	1	0	0	0	0	0	43	8
Career total			328	85	16	4	0	0	7	1	351	90

=== International ===
No.	Date	Venue	Opponent	Score	Result	Competition
1.	15 November 2022	Al Hamriya Sports Club Stadium, Al Hamriyah, United Arab Emirates	Panama	2–2	2–2	Friendly
2.	20 November 2022	Rashid Stadium, Dubai, United Arab Emirates	Syria	1–0	2–1	Friendly
