= Daniele Ghidotti =

Italian footballer (born 1985)

Personal information
- Date of birth: 3 March 1985 (age 41)
- Place of birth: Martinengo, Italy
- Height: 1.84 m (6 ft 0 in)
- Position: Defender

Youth career
- Atalanta

Senior career*
Years	Team	Apps	(Gls)
2004–2005	U.S.O. Calcio		
2005–2008	Prato		
2008–2011	Pergocrema	61	(3)
2011–2012	Como	23	(0)
2013–2014	Jolly Montemurlo		
2014–2018	Prato	112	(1)
- * Club domestic league appearances and goals as of 2 October 2018

Daniele Ghidotti (born 3 March 1985) is an Italian football player who most recently played as a defender for Italian club Prato.

== Club career ==
He made his professional debut in the Lega Pro for Pergocrema on 23 August 2009 in a game against Pro Patria.
