= Mazzano =

Mazzano Mazà
- Comune
- Comune di Mazzano
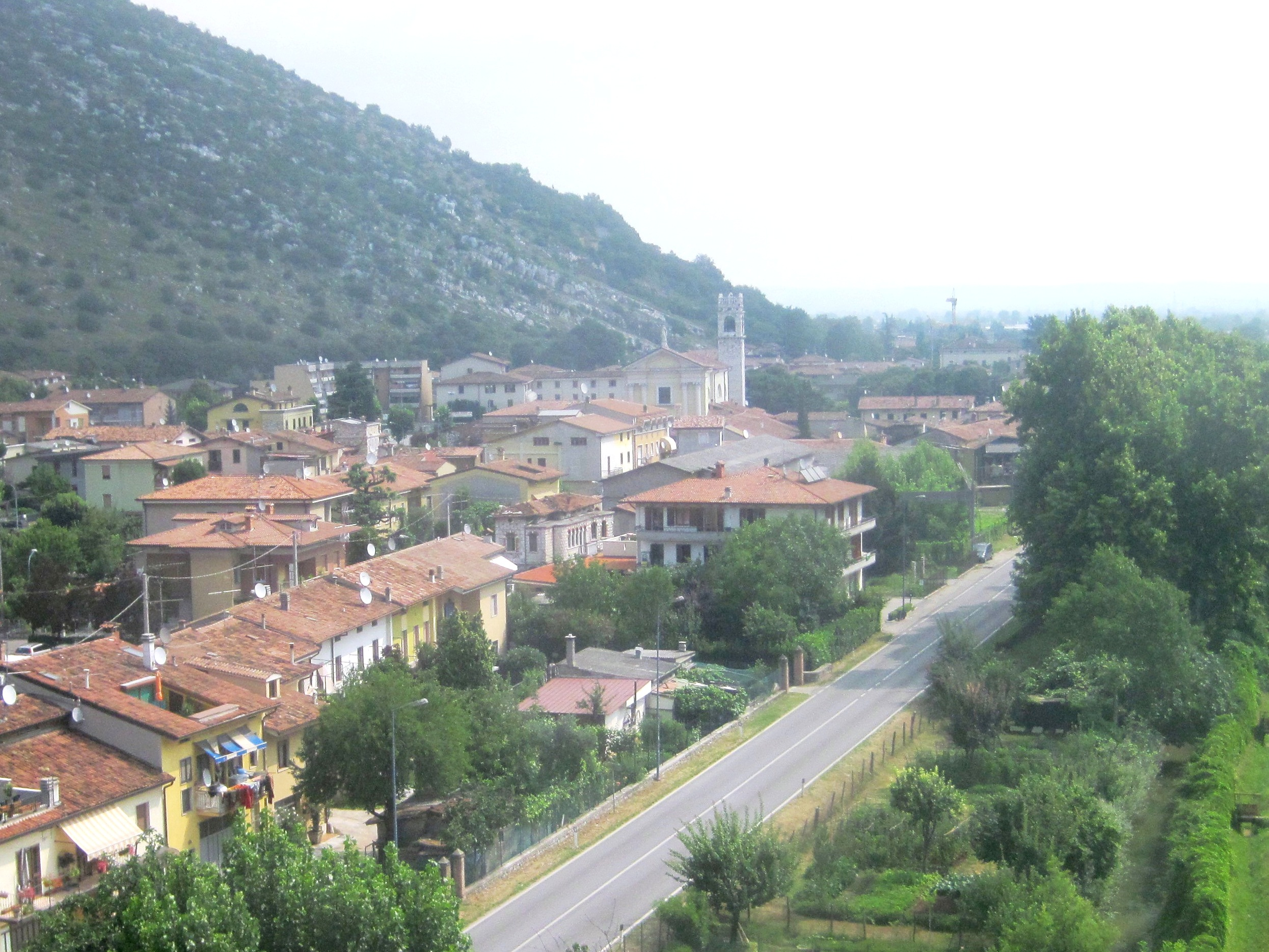

- Coat of arms

- Location within Italy Location within Lombardy
- Coordinates: 45°31′N 10°21′E
- Country: Italy
- Region: Lombardy
- Province: Brescia (BS)
- Frazioni: Cliverghe, Molinetto

Government
  - Mayor: Ferdinando Facchin

Area
  - Total: 15.73 km^{2} (6.07 sq mi)
- Elevation: 153 m (502 ft)

Population (31 December 2024)
  - Total: 12,720
  - Density: 808.6/km^{2} (2,094/sq mi)
- Demonym: Mazzanesi
- Time zone: UTC+1 (CET)
  - Summer (DST): UTC+2 (CEST)
- Postal code: 25080
- Dialing code: 030
- Patron saint: Saint Roch (Mazzano); Saint Anthony of Padua (Molinetto); Saint Philip Neri (Ciliverghe)
- Website: Official website

Mazzano (Brescian: Mazà) is a comune in the province of Brescia, in Lombardy, northern Italy. The Municipality of Mazzano has a population of 12500 inhabitants and consists of three hamlets, Mazzano, Molinetto and Ciliverghe

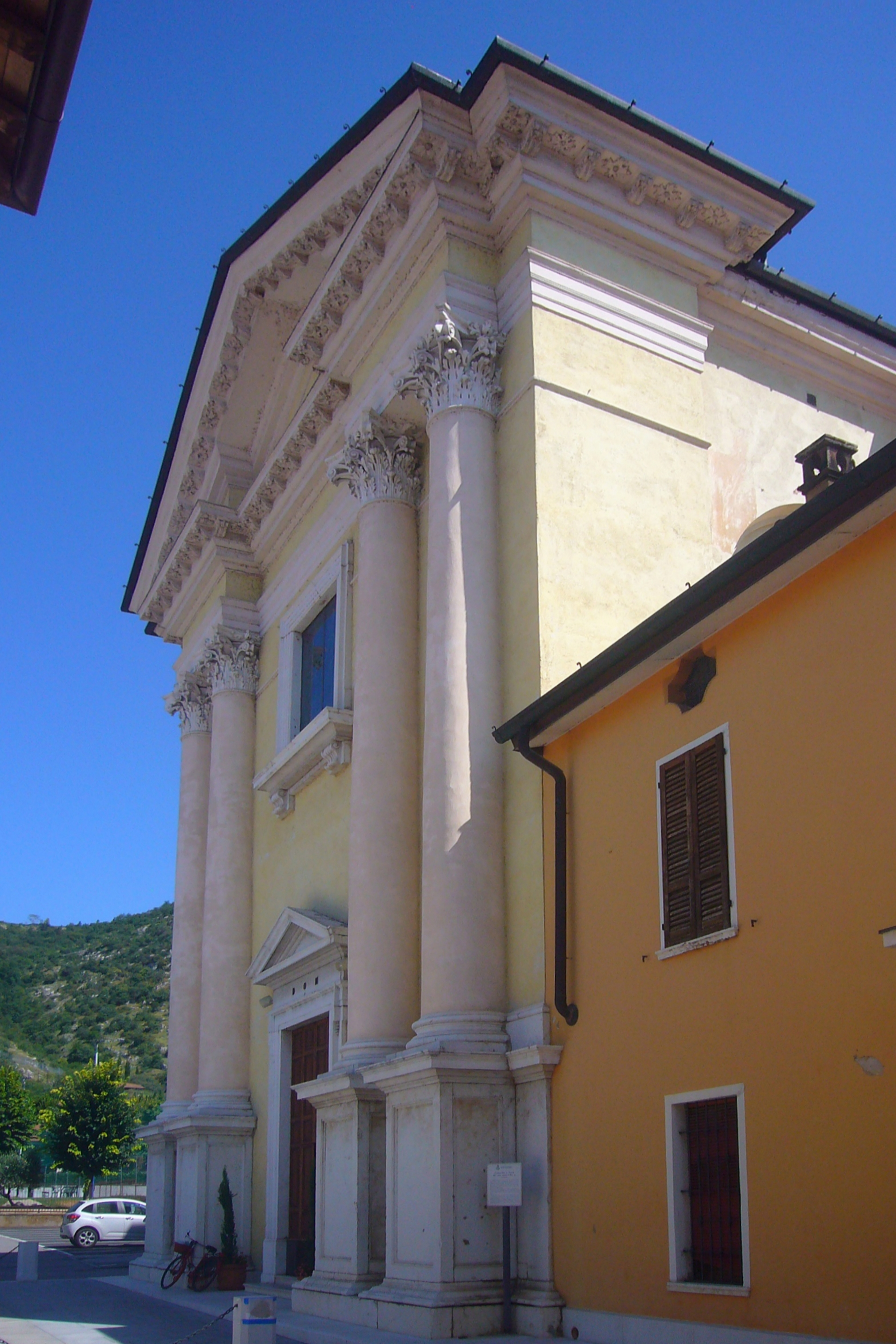
The Saint Roch church in Mazzano

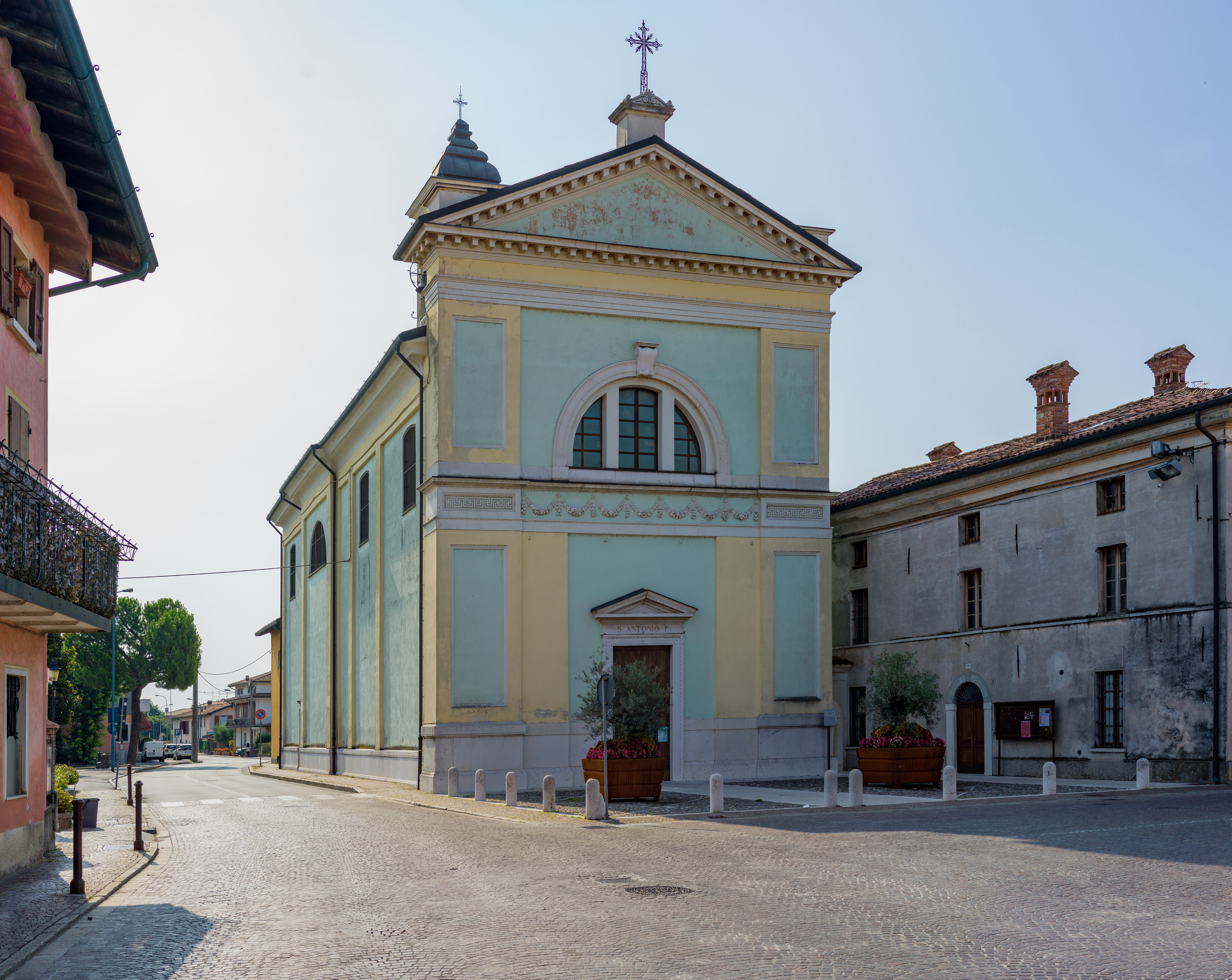
The Saint Anthony church in Molinetto

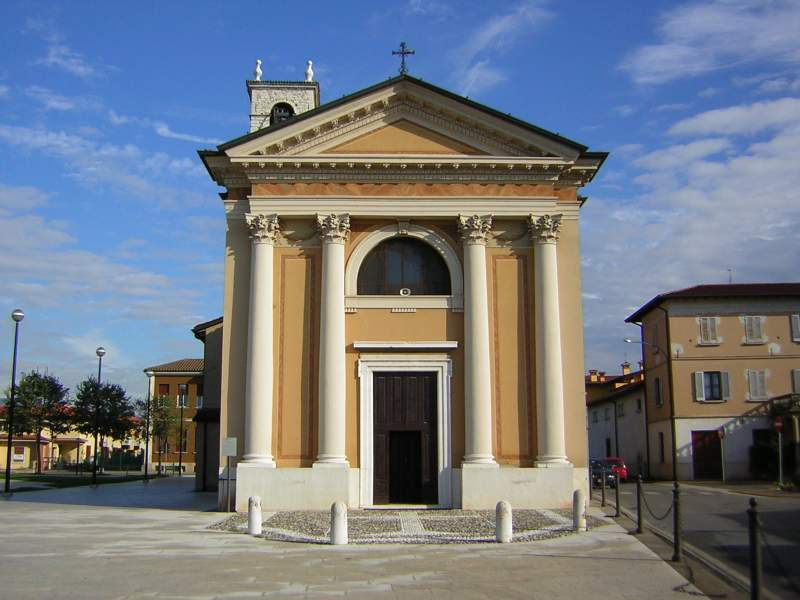
The Saint Philip church in Ciliverghe

== Twin towns ==
Mazzano is twinned with:

- Saint-Germain-des-Fossés, France

The Municipality of Mazzano is twinned with the French town of Saint-Germain-des-Fossés, located in the Allier (Auvergne), ten kilometers from Vichy. The oath of brotherhood that sanctioned the formalization of the twinning was held in October 2002 in Saint-Germain-des-Fossés and on April 25, 2003 in Mazzano. Since 2010 the municipal administration, led by the mayor Maurizio Franzoni, has no longer considered continuing relations with the French citizen without confirming the municipal commission for twinning. Relations could be mended in 2025, after a delegation from the Brescia and French municipalities met in Chambéry in March 2025.

== Sports ==
=== Alpine regularity race ===
Starting from 1986 in Mazzano there is a regularity march in the mountains of the FIE (Italian Hiking Federation) called Renato Malossi trophy in honor of the historical leader of the Alpine group.

The competition is organized by the Alpine Sports Directorate of Mazzano under the aegis of the Italian Hiking Federation and is sponsored by the Municipality of Mazzano and the Province of Brescia.

In the 34 previous editions, the race was a regional championship race and on some occasions an Italian championship race. Combined with the same gear is the Boioni and Cerqui cups for the youth and student sector and the Comune di Mazzano trophy awarded to the winners of the promotional race in pairs.

In 2019 the race was held on March 17 starting from the Mazzano Alpini's house

=== Cross country ===
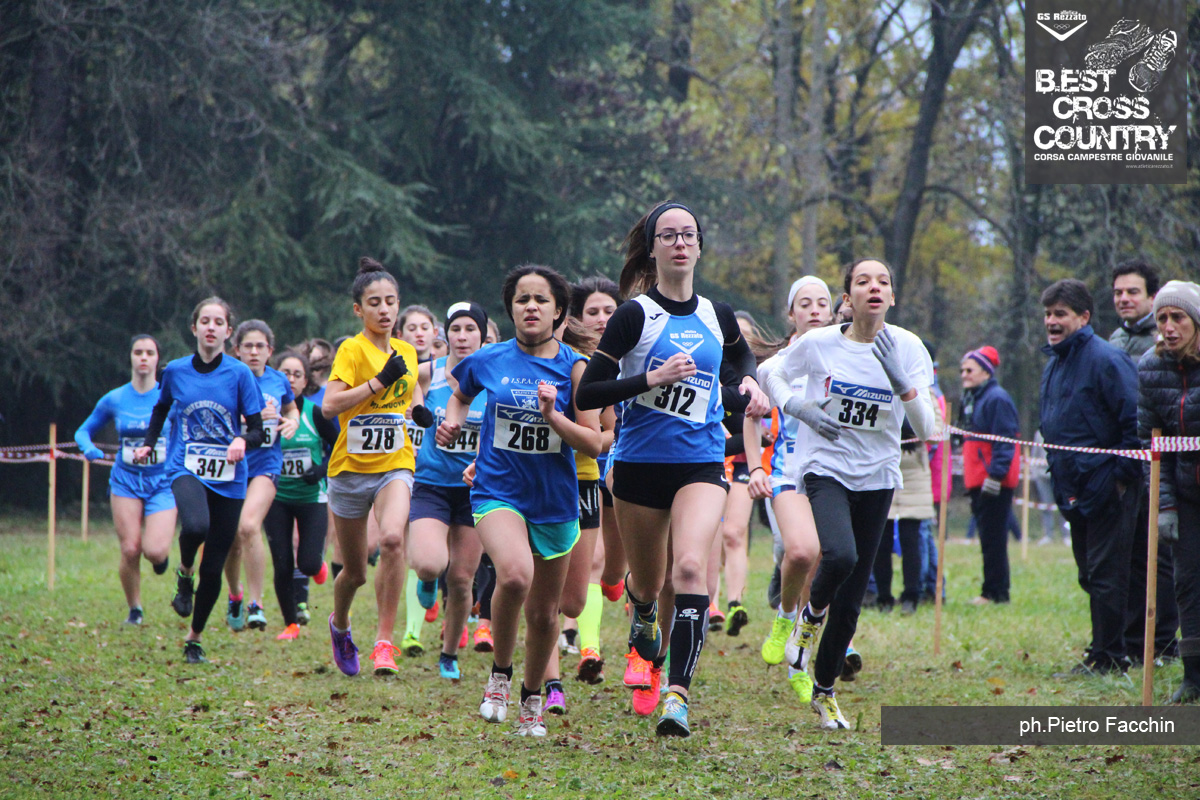
The 7° B.Est cross country (2018)

Since 2012, an important youth cross-country race called B.Est cross country has taken place in the hamlet of Ciliverghe, where B.Est represents Brescia Est, or its geographical location. The race is organized by the G.S. Atletica Rezzato under the aegis of FIDAL and is sponsored by the municipalities of Mazzano, Rezzato, Botticino, Nuvolera and Nuvolento. In the first three editions, the race took place in the extra-urban park of Ciliverghe, since 2015 the cross-country race has been moved to the park of the eighteenth-century Villa Mazzucchelli. In 2019, the race awarded the provincial champion jerseys.

=== Cyclocross ===
Since 2022, a cyclocross race has taken place in the extra-urban park of Ciliverghe with a route that winds through the same park until it touches the ancient cemetery of Lazzaretto. The race is organized under the auspices of the FCI (Italian Cycling Federation) and is called CX Verghe, playing on its geographical location. In 2023, the race awarded the provincial cyclocross champion jerseys.

=== Football ===
A.S.D.P. Ciliverghe di Mazzano is the football team of the city. It plays in Italy's Serie D after the promotion from Eccellenza Lombardy Girone C in the 2013–14 season.
