= Alessandro Semprini =

Italian footballer (born 1998)

Personal information
- Date of birth: 24 February 1998 (age 28)
- Place of birth: Brescia, Italy
- Height: 1.83 m (6 ft 0 in)
- Position: Defender

Team information
- Current team: Real Calepina
- Number: 29

Youth career
- –2017: Brescia
- 2016–2017: → Juventus (loan)

Senior career*
Years	Team	Apps	(Gls)
2015–2021	Brescia	18	(1)
2016–2017	→ Juventus (loan)	0	(0)
2018	→ Arezzo (loan)	10	(1)
2021–2022	Carrarese	32	(0)
2022–2023	Trento	18	(0)
2023–2024	Desenzano	13	(1)
2024–2025	Ciliverghe Mazzano	28	(1)
2025–	Real Calepina	33	(4)

International career^{‡}
2014	Italy U16	2	(0)
- * Club domestic league appearances and goals as of 2 August 2026 ‡ National team caps and goals as of 9 April 2014

Alessandro Semprini (born 24 February 1998) is an Italian footballer who plays as a defender for Serie D club Real Calepina.

== Club career ==
He is a product of Brescia youth teams and started appearing on the bench for the senior squad in the 2015–16 Serie B season.

For the 2016–17 season he joined Juventus on loan. He mostly played for their Under-19 squad, including the 2016–17 UEFA Youth League. He also made two appearances on the bench for the senior squad in January 2017. At the end of the season he returned to Brescia.

On 16 January 2018, he joined Serie C club Arezzo on loan until the end of the season. He made his Serie C debut for Arezzo on 3 April 2018 in a game against Livorno as a 63rd-minute substitute for Fabio Della Giovanna.

Upon his return from loan, he signed a new three-year contract with Brescia on 13 August 2018. He made his first Serie B appearance for Brescia on 24 November 2018 in a game against Venezia, he started the game and was substituted at half-time.

On 5 January 2020 he made his Serie A debut in a 2–1 home loss against Lazio. On 27 June 2020 he scored his first Serie A goal in a 2–2 home draw against Genoa.

On 9 September 2021, he joined Carrarese in Serie C.

On 4 August 2022, Semprini moved to Trento on a two-year contract. On 1 September 2023, Semprini's contract with Trento was terminated by mutual consent.

== International career ==
He represented his country for the first time with the Under-16 squad on 13 March 2014 in a friendly against Croatia.

== Career statistics ==
=== Club ===
As of match played 22 December 2021

Appearances and goals by club, season and competition
Club	Season	League			National Cup		League Cup		Continental		Total	
Club	Season	Division	Apps	Goals	Apps	Goals	Apps	Goals	Apps	Goals	Apps	Goals
Brescia	2015–16	Serie B	0	0	—		—		—		0	0
Brescia	2017–18	Serie B	0	0	2	0	—		—		2	0
Brescia	2018–19	Serie B	6	0	0	0	—		—		6	0
Brescia	2019–20	Serie A	12	1	0	0	—		—		12	1
Brescia	2020–21	Serie B	0	0	0	0	—		—		0	0
Brescia	Total		18	1	2	0	0	0	0	0	20	1
Juventus (loan)	2016–17	Serie A	0	0	0	0	—		0	0	0	0
Arezzo (loan)	2017–18	Serie C	10	1	0	0	—		—		10	1
Carrarese	2021–22	Serie C	15	0	0	0	—		—		15	0
Career total			43	2	2	0	0	0	0	0	45	2
