= Nikolas Špalek =

Slovak soccer player

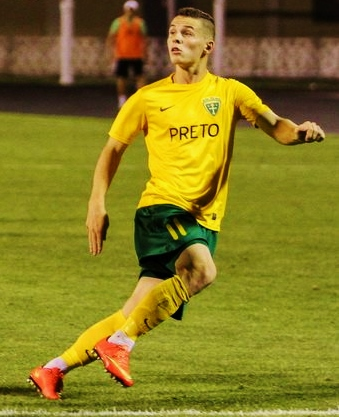

Personal information
- Date of birth: 12 February 1997 (age 29)
- Place of birth: Šaľa, Slovakia
- Height: 1.70 m (5 ft 7 in)
- Positions: Attacking midfielder; winger

Team information
- Current team: Obermais
- Number: 27

Youth career
- Neded
- Slovan Duslo Šaľa
- 2011–2014: Nitra

Senior career*
Years	Team	Apps	(Gls)
2014	Nitra	12	(0)
2014	Spartak Trnava	14	(0)
2015–2018	Žilina	85	(18)
2018–2022	Brescia	102	(9)
2022	TSC	4	(0)
2023–2024	MTK Budapest	15	(0)
2024–2025	Komárno	16	(1)
2025–2026	Giulianova	7	(0)
2026–	Obermais	7	(0)

International career^{‡}
2011–2012	Slovakia U15	5	(2)
2012	Slovakia U16	3	(3)
2012–2013	Slovakia U17	13	(1)
2014	Slovakia U18	4	(1)
2014–2016	Slovakia U19	16	(2)
2016–2018	Slovakia U21	15	(1)
- * Club domestic league appearances and goals as of 22 February 2026 ‡ National team caps and goals as of 16 October 2018

Nikolas Špalek (born 12 February 1997) is a Slovak professional footballer who plays as a winger for Italian Serie D club Obermais.

== Club career ==
Špalek was signed by Spartak Trnava in July 2014. He made his league debut for the club against Zlaté Moravce on 13 July 2014.

In January 2015, he was transferred to Žilina. In January 2018 he moved to Italian Brescia Calcio for €1 to 1.5 million. On 12 August 2022, Špalek signed with TSC in Serbia. In 2023, Špalek joined MTK Budapest on a permanent transfer and also obtained Hungarian citizenship to be eligible to play for the club.

== International career ==
Špalek enjoyed his first nomination to senior national team in November 2019, for a double qualifying fixture against Croatia and Azerbaijan. He failed to make an appearance in either of the games.

== Honours ==
MŠK Žilina

- Fortuna Liga: Winners: 2016-17
