= ASDP Ciliverghe di Mazzano =

Italian football club

Ciliverghe
- Full name: Associazione Sportiva Dilettantistica Polisportiva Ciliverghe di Mazzano
- Nickname: Gialloblù
- Founded: 1979
- Ground: Stadio Casa Cili, Mazzano, Italy
- Capacity: 600
- Chairman: Nicola Bianchini
- Manager: Stefano Tagliani
- League: Eccellenza Lombardia
- 2024–25: Serie D/B, 19th (relegated)
Home colours	Away colours

Associazione Sportiva Dilettantistica Polisportiva Ciliverghe di Mazzano, commonly referred to as Ciliverghe Calcio, is an Italian football club based in Mazzano, Lombardy. It currently plays in Eccellenza Lombardia.

== History ==
=== Foundation ===
The club was founded in 1979.

=== Serie D ===
In the season 2013–14 the team was promoted for the first time, from Eccellenza Lombardy/C to Serie D. In the 2013–14 season the team was promoted for the first time, from Lombardia Excellence / C to Serie D. The team then played in Serie D until the 2019–20 season, also going close to promotion to Serie C thanks also to the most prolific duo of that season Galuppini and Bertazzoli when they were relegated to Eccellenza, where they now play during the 2020–21 season

== Colors and badge ==
Its colors are blue and yellow.
