= Massimiliano Mangraviti =

Italian footballer

Personal information
- Date of birth: 24 January 1998 (age 28)
- Place of birth: Brescia, Italy
- Height: 1.88 m (6 ft 2 in)
- Positions: Midfielder; defender

Team information
- Current team: Cesena
- Number: 24

Youth career
- Brescia

Senior career*
Years	Team	Apps	(Gls)
2015–2024	Brescia	126	(4)
2018	→ Racing Fondi (loan)	12	(0)
2018–2019	→ Pro Piacenza (loan)	3	(0)
2019	→ Gozzano (loan)	14	(0)
2024–	Cesena	64	(1)
- * Club domestic league appearances and goals as of 13 May 2026

Massimiliano Mangraviti (born 24 January 1998) is an Italian professional footballer who plays as a midfielder or defender for Serie B club Cesena.

== Club career ==
Mangraviti made his professional debut in the Serie B for Brescia on 14 May 2016 in a game against Bari.
