= Simon Skrabb =

Finnish footballer (born 1995)

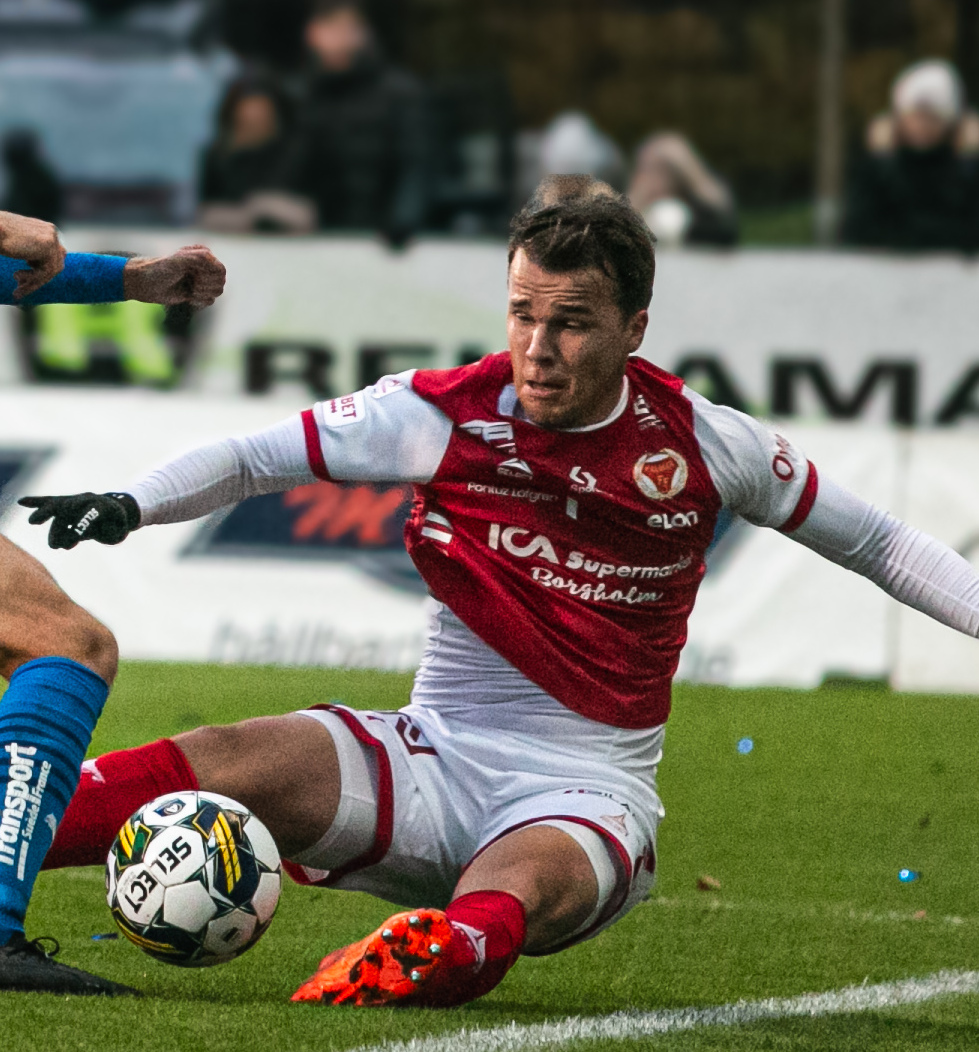
- Skrabb with Kalmar FF in 2023

Personal information
- Full name: Simon Ivar Alexander Skrabb
- Date of birth: 19 January 1995 (age 31)
- Place of birth: Jakobstad, Finland
- Height: 1.74 m (5 ft 8 1/2 in)
- Position: Attacking midfielder

Team information
- Current team: Polonia Warsaw
- Number: 23

Youth career
- 2001–2011: Jaro

Senior career*
| Years | Team | Apps | (Gls) |
| 2011–2017 | Jaro | 62 | (4) |
| 2014–2015 | → Åtvidaberg (loan) | 46 | (4) |
| 2016 | → Gefle (loan) | 28 | (7) |
| 2017–2020 | IFK Norrköping | 71 | (12) |
| 2020–2021 | Brescia | 20 | (0) |
| 2022–2024 | Kalmar | 85 | (18) |
| 2025 | Volos | 17 | (1) |
| 2025– | Polonia Warsaw | 21 | (4) |

International career
| 2010 | Finland U15 | 4 | (0) |
| 2010–2011 | Finland U16 | 11 | (2) |
| 2012 | Finland U17 | 2 | (1) |
| 2012–2013 | Finland U18 | 10 | (1) |
| 2014 | Finland U20 | 2 | (1) |
| 2014–2016 | Finland U21 | 16 | (1) |
| 2016–2019 | Finland | 14 | (0) |
- * Club domestic league appearances and goals as of 15:33, 29 May 2026 (UTC)

Simon Skrabb (born 19 January 1995) is a Finnish professional footballer who plays as an attacking midfielder for I liga club Polonia Warsaw.

== Club career ==
=== Jaro ===
On 12 May 2011, he became the youngest player to score a goal in a Veikkausliiga match.

Skrabb is also noted for having scored a scorpion kick in an away match against Gefle IF while playing for Åtvidaberg in the 2015 Allsvenskan. In spite of this, Skrabb's team were relegated from the Swedish top flight at the end of the season after finishing bottom of the table.

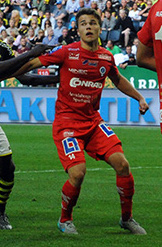
Skrabb with Åtvidaberg in 2015

=== IFK Norrköping ===
On 9 December 2016 it was reported that Skrabb had signed a four-year contract with IFK Norrköping.

=== Brescia ===
On 13 January 2020, he signed a three-and-a-half-year contract with Italian club Brescia, for a transfer fee of €2.8 million plus bonuses. His time with Brescia was plagued by multiple consecutive injuries. The team was also coached by six different head coaches during 18 months span due to a turmoil in the club, and eventually his contract was terminated by mutual consent on 22 October 2021. Skrabb played only 21 games with Brescia.

=== Kalmar ===
On 26 January 2022, Skrabb signed with Kalmar FF in Sweden for the 2022 season. During the 2023 season, Skrabb occasionally wore the captain's armband with Kalmar. He finished the 2023 season scoring 9 goals and giving 8 assists in 30 Allsvenskan matches.

On 17 February 2024, Skrabb was officially named the captain of Kalmar FF for the 2024 season.

=== Volos ===
Skrabb left Kalmar after the relegation and signed with Super League Greece club Volos, starting in January 2025. He made his Greek league debut on 5 January, as a starter in a 4–2 away defeat against AEK Athens. Skrabb scored his first goal in the league on 1 February, in a 1–1 draw against Panserraikos.

=== Polonia Warsaw ===
On 9 August 2025, Skrabb signed a two-year contract with Polish I liga club Polonia Warsaw.

== International career ==
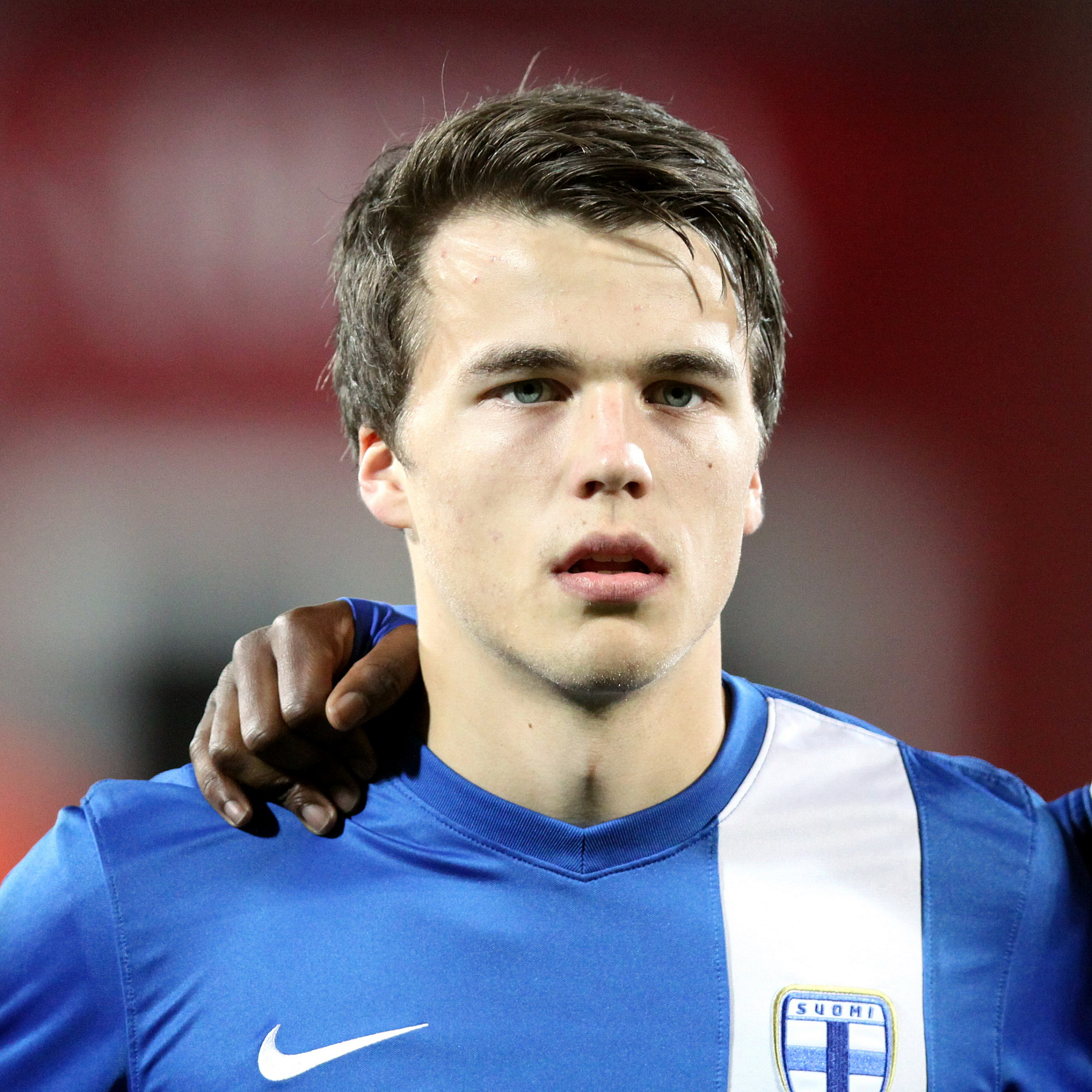
Skrabb with the Finland U21 national team in 2015

He made his debut for the Finland national team on 10 January 2016 in a friendly match in Abu Dhabi against Sweden, entering the game as a substitute for Roope Riski.

== Career statistics ==
=== Club ===
As of match played 28 May 2026

Appearances and goals by club, season and competition
| Club | Season | League | | | National cup (Note: Includes Suomen Cup, Svenska Cupen and Coppa Italia) | | League cup (Note: Includes Finnish League Cup) | | Continental | | Total | |
| Club | Season | Division | Apps | Goals | Apps | Goals | Apps | Goals | Apps | Goals | Apps | Goals |
|---|---|---|---|---|---|---|---|---|---|---|---|---|
| FF Jaro | 2011 | Veikkausliiga | 25 | 2 | 0 | 0 | 1 | 0 | — | | 26 | 2 |
| FF Jaro | 2012 | Veikkausliiga | 28 | 0 | 1 | 0 | 6 | 2 | — | | 35 | 2 |
| FF Jaro | 2013 | Veikkausliiga | 9 | 2 | 1 | 0 | 4 | 1 | — | | 14 | 3 |
| FF Jaro | Total | | 62 | 4 | 2 | 0 | 11 | 3 | 0 | 0 | 75 | 7 |
| Åtvidaberg (loan) | 2014 | Allsvenskan | 18 | 0 | 4 | 0 | — | | — | | 22 | 0 |
| Åtvidaberg (loan) | 2015 | Allsvenskan | 28 | 4 | 1 | 0 | — | | — | | 29 | 4 |
| Åtvidaberg (loan) | Total | | 46 | 4 | 5 | 0 | 0 | 0 | 0 | 0 | 51 | 4 |
| Gefle (loan) | 2016 | Allsvenskan | 28 | 7 | 3 | 1 | — | | — | | 31 | 8 |
| Norrköping | 2017 | Allsvenskan | 14 | 1 | 4 | 1 | — | | 4 (Note: Appearances in UEFA Europa League) | 1 | 22 | 3 |
| Norrköping | 2018 | Allsvenskan | 29 | 7 | 0 | 0 | — | | — | | 29 | 7 |
| Norrköping | 2019 | Allsvenskan | 28 | 4 | 1 | 0 | — | | 6 | 0 | 35 | 4 |
| Norrköping | Total | | 71 | 12 | 5 | 1 | 0 | 0 | 10 | 1 | 86 | 14 |
| Brescia | 2019–20 | Serie A | 10 | 0 | 0 | 0 | — | | — | | 10 | 0 |
| Brescia | 2020–21 | Serie B | 10 | 0 | 1 | 0 | — | | — | | 11 | 0 |
| Brescia | Total | | 20 | 0 | 1 | 0 | 0 | 0 | 0 | 0 | 21 | 0 |
| Kalmar | 2022 | Allsvenskan | 27 | 3 | 3 | 0 | — | | — | | 30 | 3 |
| Kalmar | 2023 | Allsvenskan | 30 | 9 | 4 | 1 | — | | 2 (Note: Appearances in UEFA Europa Conference League) | 0 | 36 | 10 |
| Kalmar | 2024 | Allsvenskan | 28 | 6 | 4 | 0 | — | | — | | 32 | 6 |
| Kalmar | Total | | 85 | 18 | 11 | 1 | 0 | 0 | 2 | 0 | 98 | 19 |
| Volos | 2024–25 | Super League Greece | 17 | 1 | 0 | 0 | — | | — | | 17 | 1 |
| Polonia Warsaw | 2025–26 | I liga | 21 (Note: Includes one appearance and one goal in I liga promotion play-offs) | 4 | 0 | 0 | — | | — | | 21 | 4 |
| Career total | | | 350 | 50 | 27 | 3 | 11 | 3 | 12 | 1 | 400 | 57 |

=== International ===
As of match played 18 November 2019

Appearances and goals by national team, year and competition
| Team | Year | Competitive | | Friendly | | Total | |
| Team | Year | Apps | Goals | Apps | Goals | Apps | Goals |
|---|---|---|---|---|---|---|---|
| Finland | 2016 | 0 | 0 | 1 | 0 | 1 | 0 |
| Finland | 2017 | 2 (Note: Appearances in the 2018 FIFA World Cup qualification.) | 0 | 3 | 0 | 5 | 0 |
| Finland | 2018 | 1 (Note: Appearances in the 2018–19 UEFA Nations League.) | 0 | 2 | 0 | 3 | 0 |
| Finland | 2019 | 3 (Note: Appearances in the UEFA Euro 2020 qualifying.) | 0 | 2 | 0 | 5 | 0 |
| Total | | 6 | 0 | 8 | 0 | 14 | 0 |

== Honours ==
Individual

- Fotbollsgalan Swedish Goal of the Year: 2015
