= Florian Ayé =

French footballer (born 1997)

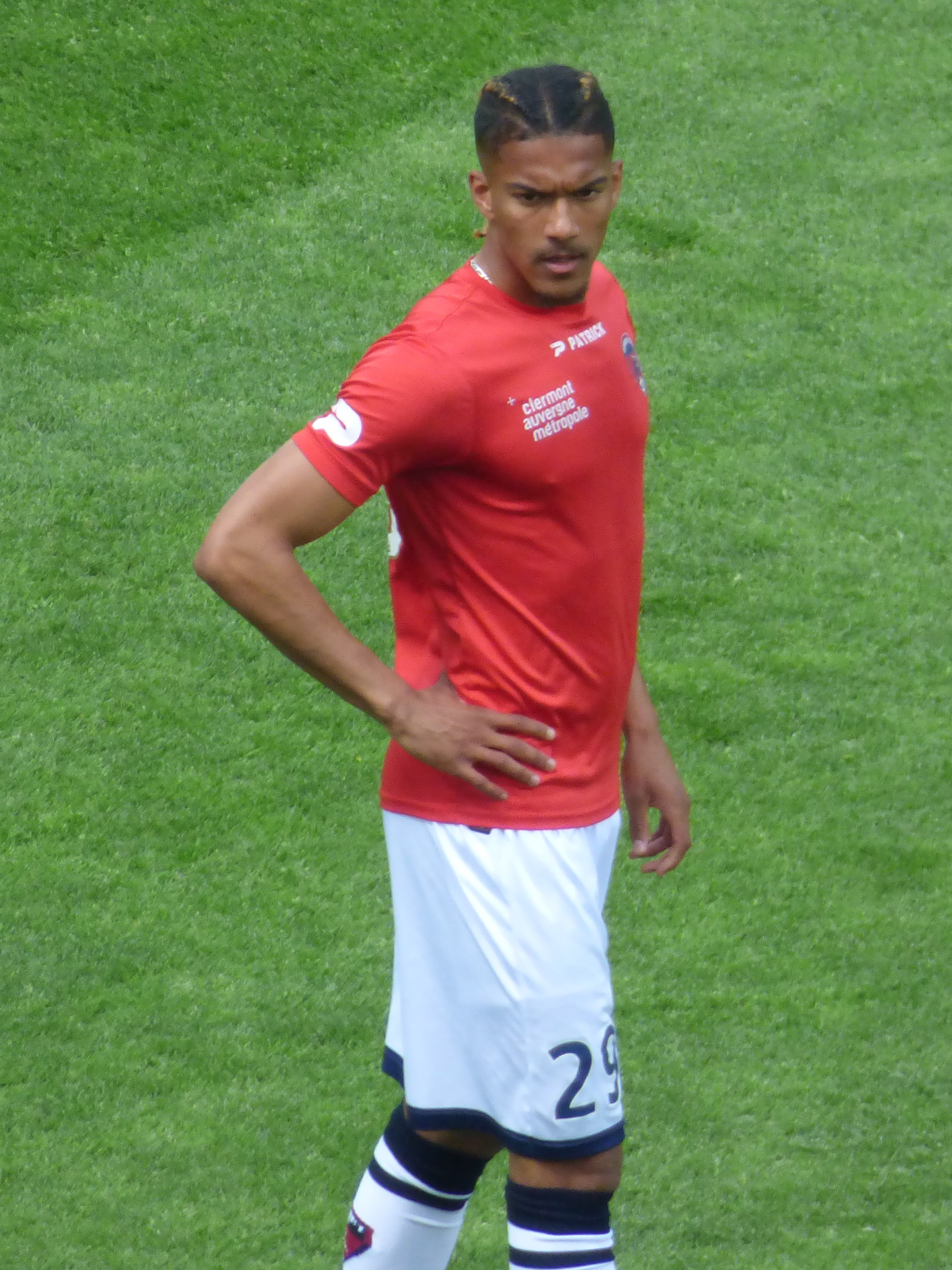
- Ayé in 2019

Personal information
- Date of birth: 19 January 1997 (age 29)
- Place of birth: Paris, France
- Height: 1.84 m (6 ft 0 in)
- Position: Forward

Team information
- Current team: Kocaelispor
- Number: 97

Youth career
- 2004–2008: CS Quincy
- 2008–2010: US Moissy-Cramayel
- 2010–2012: CS Brétigny
- 2012–2014: Auxerre

Senior career*
Years	Team	Apps	(Gls)
2014–2016	Auxerre B	48	(22)
2015–2018	Auxerre	48	(3)
2018–2019	Clermont	38	(18)
2019–2023	Brescia	116	(28)
2023–2025	Auxerre	61	(12)
2025–2026	Servette	29	(11)
2026–	Kocaelispor	8	(1)

International career
2012	France U16	2	(2)
2015	France U18	3	(2)
2015–2017	France U19	17	(2)
2016	France U20	3	(0)
- * Club domestic league appearances and goals as of 31 October 2026

Florian Ayé (born 9 January 1997) is a French professional footballer who plays as a forward for Süper Lig club Kocaelispor in Turkey.

== Career ==
On 5 July 2019, Ayé moved from Clermont to Serie A club Brescia. He signed a three-year contract with the club.

On 31 July 2023, Ligue 2 side Auxerre announced the return of Ayé to the club on a three-year contract, for a reported fee of €1.5 million.

On 8 August 2025, Ayé joined Servette in Switzerland on a three-year deal.

== Personal life ==
He is of Beninese descent.

== Career statistics ==
As of match played on 29 April 2024

Appearances and goals by club, season and competition
Club	Season	League			National cup		League cup		Other		Total	
Club	Season	Division	Apps	Goals	Apps	Goals	Apps	Goals	Apps	Goals	Apps	Goals
Auxerre II	2014–15	CFA 2	9	2	—		—		—		9	2
Auxerre II	2015–16	CFA	17	4	—		—		—		17	4
Auxerre II	2016–17	CFA	14	11	—		—		—		14	1
Auxerre II	2017–18	National 3	8	5	—		—		—		8	5
Auxerre II	Total		48	22	—		—		—		48	22
Auxerre	2015–16	Ligue 2	8	1	0	0	1	0	—		9	1
Auxerre	2016–17	Ligue 2	20	0	2	0	2	0	—		24	0
Auxerre	2017–18	Ligue 2	20	2	4	2	1	1	—		25	5
Auxerre	Total		48	3	6	2	4	1	—		58	6
Clermont	2018–19	Ligue 2	38	18	3	1	0	0	—		41	19
Brescia	2019–20	Serie A	22	0	1	0	—		—		23	0
Brescia	2020–21	Serie B	38	16	1	1	—		—		39	17
Brescia	2021–22	Serie B	19	4	1	0	—		1 (Note: Appearance in the 2021–22 Serie B Promotion play-offs)	1	21	5
Brescia	2022–23	Serie B	37	8	1	1	—		2 (Note: Appearances in the 2022–23 Serie B Relegation play-out)	0	40	9
Brescia	Total		116	28	4	2	0	0	3	1	123	31
Auxerre	2023–24	Ligue 2	35	10	3	2	—		—		38	12
Career total			285	81	16	7	4	1	3	1	308	90

== Honours ==
Auxerre

- Ligue 2: 2023–24

France U19

- UEFA European Under-19 Championship: 2016
