= Andrea Ghezzi =

Italian footballer (born 2001)

Personal information
- Date of birth: 3 February 2001 (age 25)
- Place of birth: Treviglio, Italy
- Height: 1.78 m (5 ft 10 in)
- Position: Forward

Team information
- Current team: Vado (on loan from Cittadella)

Youth career
- –2020: Brescia

Senior career*
| Years | Team | Apps | (Gls) |
| 2020–2022 | Brescia | 11 | (0) |
| 2021–2022 | → Pro Sesto (loan) | 29 | (4) |
| 2022–2026 | Renate | 78 | (3) |
| 2026– | Cittadella | 12 | (0) |
| 2026– | → Vado (loan) | 0 | (0) |
- * Club domestic league appearances and goals as of 29 April 2026

Andrea Ghezzi (born 3 February 2001) is an Italian footballer who plays as a forward for Serie C Group B club Vado on loan from Cittadella.

== Career ==
On 16 June 2020 he signed his first contract for Brescia. He did his Serie A debut with Brescia 11 days after in a 2–2 home draw against Genoa. On the same day he extended his contract for Brescia until 2021. On 3 September 2021, he joined Serie C club Pro Sesto, on loan.

On 14 July 2022, Ghezzi signed a three-year contract with Renate.

== Club statistics ==
=== Club ===
As of 11 July 2020.

| Club | Season | League | | | Cup | | Other | | Total | |
| Club | Season | Division | Apps | Goals | Apps | Goals | Apps | Goals | Apps | Goals |
|---|---|---|---|---|---|---|---|---|---|---|
| Brescia | 2019–20 | Serie A | 4 | 0 | 0 | 0 | 0 | 0 | 4 | 0 |
| Career total | | | 4 | 0 | 0 | 0 | 0 | 0 | 4 | 0 |
