= Lorenzo Andrenacci =

Italian footballer (born 1995)

Personal information
- Date of birth: 2 January 1995 (age 31)
- Place of birth: Fermo, Italy
- Height: 1.88 m (6 ft 2 in)
- Position: Goalkeeper

Team information
- Current team: Lumezzane
- Number: 13

Youth career
- –2014: Milan
- 2014: Brescia

Senior career*
Years	Team	Apps	(Gls)
2014–2021	Brescia	17	(0)
2015–2016	→ Como (loan)	0	(0)
2016–2017	→ Fano (loan)	13	(0)
2021–2022	Genoa	0	(0)
2022	→ Brescia (loan)	0	(0)
2022–2025	Brescia	32	(0)
2025–2026	Mantova	0	(0)
2026–	Lumezzane	1	(0)
- * Club domestic league appearances and goals as of 22 August 2026

Lorenzo Andrenacci (born 2 January 1995) is an Italian football player who plays for Serie C Group A club Lumezzane.

== Club career ==
He made his Serie B debut for Brescia on 3 March 2015 in a game against Modena.

On 16 February 2020 he made his Serie A debut for Brescia in a game against Juventus.

On 12 July 2021, he signed with Genoa. On 31 January 2022, Andrenaccci returned to Brescia on loan. On 18 June 2022, he moved to Brescia on a permanent basis.
