= Aleš Matějů =

Czech footballer

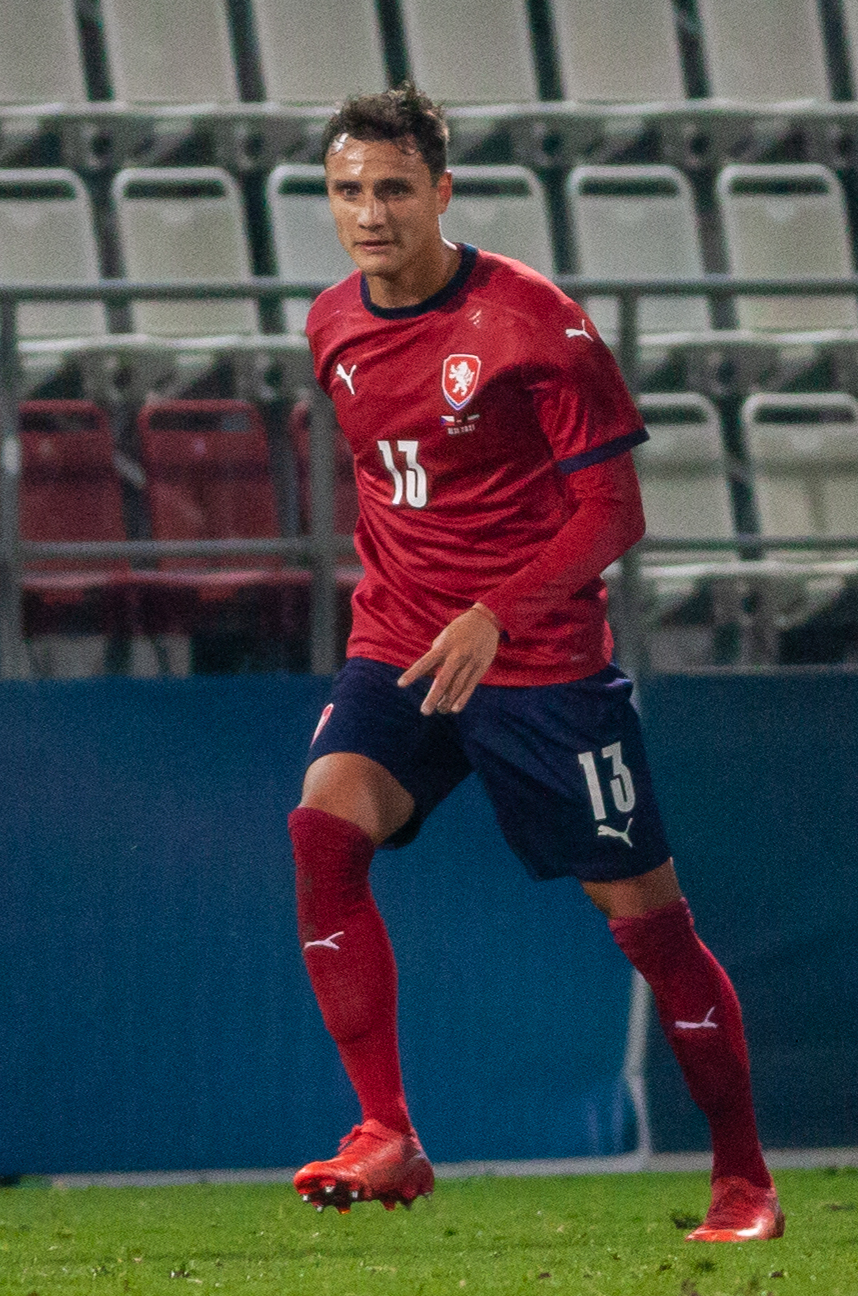
- Matějů in 2021

Personal information
- Full name: Aleš Matějů
- Date of birth: 3 June 1996 (age 30)
- Place of birth: Příbram, Czech Republic
- Height: 1.84 m (6 ft 0 in)
- Position: Right back

Team information
- Current team: Spezia
- Number: 37

Youth career
- Příbram
- 2014: → PSV Eindhoven (loan)

Senior career*
Years	Team	Apps	(Gls)
2014–2015	Příbram	15	(1)
2015–2017	Viktoria Plzeň	35	(0)
2017–2019	Brighton & Hove Albion	0	(0)
2018–2019	→ Brescia (loan)	22	(0)
2019–2021	Brescia	74	(1)
2022	Venezia	9	(0)
2022–2024	Palermo	50	(0)
2024–	Spezia	80	(2)

International career
2011–2012	Czech Republic U16	13	(0)
2012–2013	Czech Republic U17	16	(1)
2013	Czech Republic U18	3	(1)
2013–2015	Czech Republic U19	17	(0)
2015	Czech Republic U20	2	(0)
2015–2017	Czech Republic U21	17	(1)
2020–2022	Czech Republic	15	(0)
- * Club domestic league appearances and goals as of 13 May 2026

Aleš Matějů (Czech pronunciation: [ˈalɛʃ ˈmacɛjuː]; born 3 June 1996) is a Czech professional footballer who plays as a defender for Serie C Group B side Spezia. He previously played for Příbram, Viktoria Plzeň, Brighton & Hove Albion, Brescia, Venezia and Palermo, and has represented his country at all underage levels. He has earned 15 caps for the Czech Republic national team.

== Career ==
=== Early club career ===
Matějů made his career league debut for Příbram on 30 August 2014 in a 4–1 loss away to Slovácko in the Czech First League. He scored his first league goal in the 1–1 draw with Teplice on 17 May 2015 and finished the season with one goal in 15 league matches.

Matějů moved to Viktoria Plzeň in 2015 and became an integral part of the squad, appearing in the starting eleven in 16 consecutive matches and helping Plzeň win the First League title and Czech Supercup in 2016. However, his status in the team was downgraded in the 2016–17 season as Radim Řezník took his place as the first-choice right back. He later signed a three-year contract with English Premier League club Brighton & Hove Albion on 4 August 2017.

=== Italy ===
Matějů spent the 2018–19 season on loan to Italian club Brescia, helping them win the Serie B title and with it promotion to Serie A, and then signed a permanent contract for an undisclosed fee. On 1 January 2022, his contract with Brescia was terminated by mutual consent.

On 10 February 2022, Matějů signed with Venezia until the end of the 2021–22 season, with an option to extend for two more years.

On 26 August 2022, having been released by Venezia, Matějů signed for Serie B club Palermo as a free transfer, reuniting with his former Brescia coach Eugenio Corini. On 24 January 2024, he signed for Serie B club Spezia with an option when the club stays in the Serie B at the end of the season.

== International career ==
Matějů represented the Czech Republic at all youth levels from under-16 to under-21. He debuted for the Czech senior squad on 7 October 2020 in a friendly match against Cyprus.

== Career statistics ==
As of match played 10 April 2021

Appearances and goals by club, season and competition
Club	Season	League			National cup (Note: Includes Czech Cup, Coppa Italia)		League cup (Note: Includes EFL Cup)		Other		Total	
Club	Season	Division	Apps	Goals	Apps	Goals	Apps	Goals	Apps	Goals	Apps	Goals
1. FK Příbram	2014–15	Czech First League	15	1	0	0	—		—		15	1
Viktoria Plzeň	2015–16	Czech First League	17	0	6	1	—		2 (Note: Appearances in UEFA Europa League)	0	25	1
Viktoria Plzeň	2016–17	Czech First League	18	0	1	0	—		8 (Note: Four appearances and one goal in UEFA Champions League, four appearances in UEFA Europa League)	1	27	1
Viktoria Plzeň	Total		35	0	7	1	—		10	1	52	2
Brighton & Hove Albion	2017–18	Premier League	0	0	0	0	2	0	—		2	0
Brescia (loan)	2018–19	Serie B	22	0	1	0	—		—		23	0
Brescia	2019–20	Serie A	31	0	1	0	—		—		32	0
Brescia	2020–21	Serie B	22	1	1	0	—		—		23	1
Brescia	Total		75	1	3	0	—		—		78	1
Career total			125	2	10	1	2	0	10	1	147	4
