= Dimitri Bisoli =

Italian footballer (born 1994)

Personal information
- Date of birth: 25 March 1994 (age 32)
- Place of birth: Cagliari, Italy
- Height: 1.80 m (5 ft 11 in)
- Position: Midfielder

Team information
- Current team: Cesena
- Number: 25

Youth career
- 2007–2008: Foligno
- 2008–2010: Cesena
- 2010–2011: Cagliari
- 2011–2012: Bologna

Senior career*
Years	Team	Apps	(Gls)
2012–2013	Prato	14	(0)
2013–2015	Santarcangelo	56	(1)
2015–2017	Fidelis Andria	33	(1)
2016–2025	Brescia	306	(31)
2025–	Cesena	28	(1)

International career
2011	Italy U17	2	(0)
- * Club domestic league appearances and goals as of 13 May 2026

Dimitri Bisoli (born 25 March 1994) is an Italian professional footballer who plays as midfielder for Serie B club Cesena.

== Career ==
Bisoli began his professional career for Lega Pro Prima Divisione club Prato in 2012. He then played for Santarcangelo and Fidelis Andria. Following an impressive season with the Apulian club, he was signed on loan by Brescia, with an option to buy

Subsequently signed permanently by the Rondinelle, Bisoli established himself as a starter, being a main part of the team's promotion to Serie A in 2018–2019. On 25 August 2019, he made his Serie A debut during an away match at Cagliari; on 9 February 2020 he scored his first top flight goal, during a home league match against Udinese, which ended in a 1–1 draw.

Since the 2020–21 season, following the retirement of Daniele Gastaldello, Bisoli has been serving as team captain.

On 10 July 2025, Bisoli signed a three-season contract with Cesena.

== Personal life ==
He is the son of Italian football manager and former player Pierpaolo Bisoli.
