= Alfredo Donnarumma =

Italian footballer (born 1990)

Personal information
- Date of birth: 30 November 1990 (age 35)
- Place of birth: Torre Annunziata, Italy
- Height: 1.80 m (5 ft 11 in)
- Positions: Forward; attacking midfielder

Youth career
- 1995–2005: Torre Annunziata
- 2004–2010: Catania

Senior career*
Years	Team	Apps	(Gls)
2010–2013	Catania	0	(0)
2010–2011	→ Gubbio (loan)	23	(5)
2012	→ Lanciano (loan)	10	(0)
2012–2013	→ Como (loan)	32	(14)
2013–2014	Cittadella	20	(3)
2014	Pescara	0	(0)
2014–2015	Teramo	37	(22)
2015–2017	Salernitana	59	(18)
2017–2018	Empoli	38	(23)
2018–2022	Brescia	88	(39)
2021–2022	→ Ternana (loan)	32	(14)
2022–2026	Ternana	38	(3)
2023–2024	→ Catanzaro (loan)	20	(2)
2025–2026	→ Lumezzane (loan)	13	(0)
- * Club domestic league appearances and goals as of 29 April 2026

Alfredo Donnarumma (Italian pronunciation: [alˈfreːdo ˌdɔnnaˈrumma]; born 30 November 1990) is an Italian professional footballer who plays as a forward or attacking midfielder.

== Career ==
=== Torre Annunziata ===
Born in Torre Annunziata near Naples, Alfredo started his playing career with his hometown club, Calcio Azzurri di Torre Annunziata. He played there until he was 14, when Calcio Catania sporting director Pietro Lo Monaco scouted the player and signed him.

=== Catania ===
After transferring to Catania, Donnarumma played for all levels of the club's youth setup and in 2008 joined the Primavera U-20 team of Catania, the highest youth level below the first team. He played alongside Alessandro Malafronte and Francesco Nicastro during his time within Catania's youth program. He also scored 16 goals in his final youth season at the club. His senior playing career began in 2009, when the attacker earned first-team call-ups towards the end of the 2009–10 Serie A campaign, at the age of 18. Despite failing to make his Serie A debut with the club, the player graduated the club's youth set-up at the conclusion of the 2009–10 season.

In July 2010, Donnarumma was loaned out to Lega Pro Prima Divisione side, A.S. Gubbio 1910 in order to earn regular playing experience. During his spell with the third division club, Donnarumma made 23 league appearances, scoring 5 league goals. In his 25 official matches for the Gubbio, Donnarumma was a part of the starting lineup 22 times. On 30 June 2011, Donnarumma returned to Catania, where he remained until 30 January 2012, when he was sent out on loan to Lega Pro Prima Divisione side, Virtus Lanciano after failing to make his Catania debut. With the Lanciano-based club, Donnarumma spent time with the senior squad as well as the youth team. With the youth side, Donnarumma scored 8 goals in just 8 appearances, while with the first team, he failed to have the same impact. During the ritorno of the 2011–12 Lega Pro campaign, he appeared just 10 times for the club, all as a substitute. After again returning to Sicily, Donnarumma was asked to go out on loan once more prior to the 2012–13 Serie A season. He transferred to Calcio Como on 11 July 2012, and had a successful season with the team. He was virtually ever-present for the third division club, appearing in 29 league matches (27 of which were starts) and scoring 14 league goals.

Alfredo Donnarumma returned to Catania on 30 June 2013.

=== Cittadella ===
On 2 September 2013, Donnarumma was officially sold on a co-ownership basis to A.S. Cittadella for a peppercorn fee of five hundred euro. In June 2014 Cittadella signed Donnarumma outright.

=== Pescara & Teramo ===
In summer 2014 Donnarumma was signed by Pescara. In the same year he was loaned to Teramo. On 17 July 2015, Donnarumma was signed by Teramo outright. However, the Serie B newcomer was expelled due to match-fixing.

=== Salernitana ===
On 31 August 2015, Donnarumma was sold to Salernitana.

=== Empoli ===
On 11 July 2017, Donnarumma was signed by Empoli from Salernitana. He helped Empoli win the Serie B title and achieve promotion to Serie A during the 2017–18 season, alongside Francesco Caputo; together, the pair scored 49 goals, finishing as the top two scorers in the league, with Donnarumma scoring 23 goals and Caputo 26.

=== Brescia ===
On 13 July 2018, Donnarumma signed with Brescia. Donnarumma won the 2018–19 Serie B title with Brescia, finishing the season as the league's top scorer with 25 goals, thus helping the club to achieve promotion to Serie A.

On 25 August 2019, Donnarumma made his Serie A debut, also scoring his first goal in the Italian top flight, in a 1–0 away win over Cagliari.

=== Ternana ===
On 11 August 2021, he moved to Ternana on loan with an obligation to buy. On 10 August 2023, Donnarumma was loaned to Catanzaro for the season.

== Style of play ==
Although he primarily plays off of another forward as a second striker, Donnarumma is capable of playing anywhere along the front line, and has also been deployed in the centre as a main striker, out wide as a winger, or even in a deeper, creative role as an attacking midfielder. He has been noted for his technique, dribbling skills, link-up play, and work-rate off the ball. Although he is known for his ability to create chances and provide assists for other players, he is also capable of scoring with either foot and his head.

== Personal life ==
On 27 November 2020, it was announced that Donnarumma tested positive for COVID-19, while being asymptomatic, amid its pandemic in Italy.

== Honours ==
Empoli

- Serie B: 2017–18

Brescia

- Serie B: 2018–19

Individual

- Serie B top scorer: 2018–19 (25 goals)
