= Antonio Conte =

Italian football manager (born 1969)

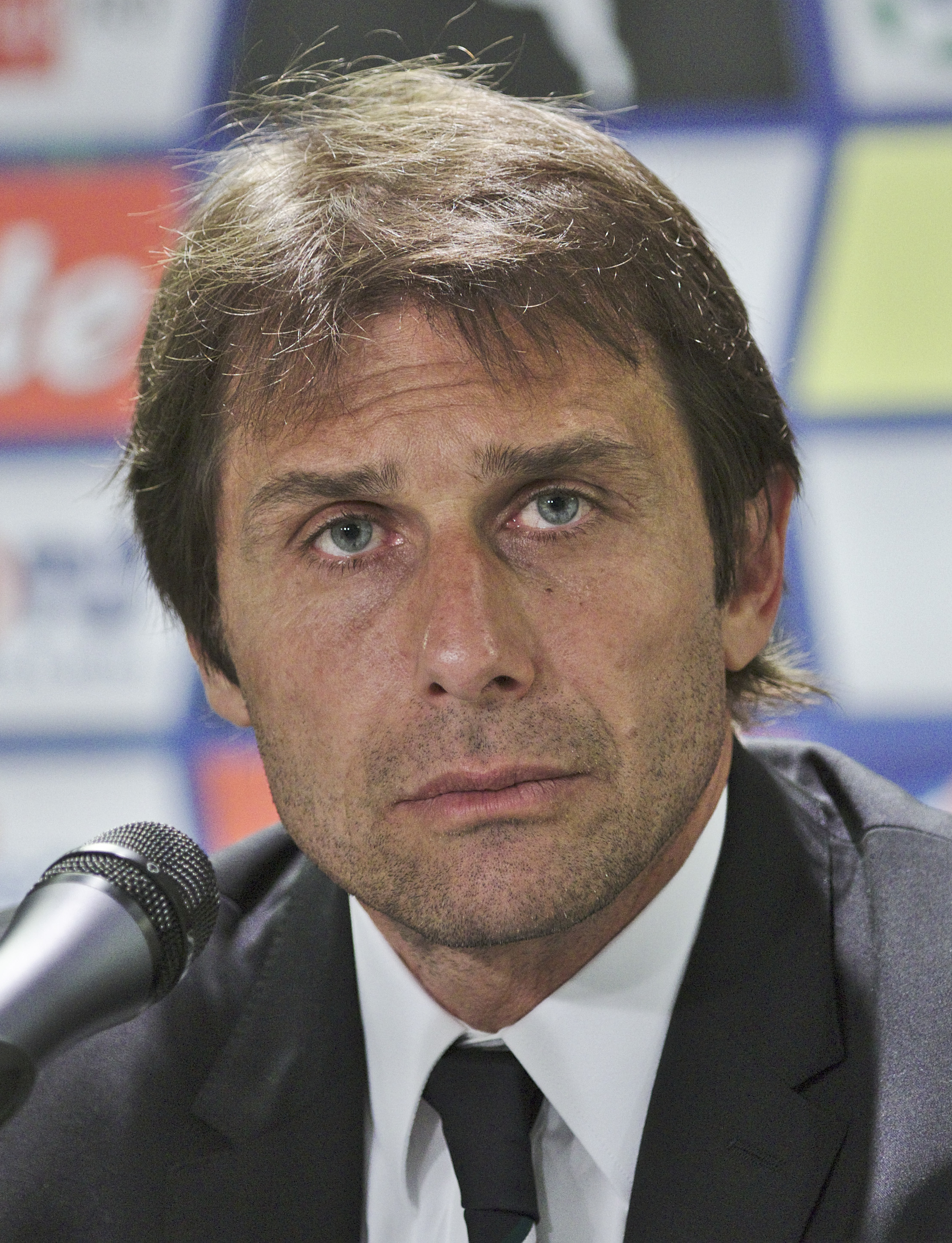
- Conte with Italy in 2015

Personal information
- Date of birth: 31 July 1969 (age 57)
- Place of birth: Lecce, Italy
- Height: 1.78 m (5 ft 10 in)
- Position: Midfielder

Youth career
- 1982–1988: Lecce

Senior career*
Years	Team	Apps	(Gls)
1985–1991	Lecce	81	(1)
1991–2004	Juventus	296	(29)
Total		377	(30)

International career
1994–2000	Italy	20	(2)

Managerial career
- 2006: Arezzo
- 2007: Arezzo
- 2007–2009: Bari
- 2009–2010: Atalanta
- 2010–2011: Siena
- 2011–2014: Juventus
- 2014–2016: Italy
- 2016–2018: Chelsea
- 2019–2021: Inter Milan
- 2021–2023: Tottenham Hotspur
- 2024–2026: Napoli
Medal record
Men's Football
Representing Italy
FIFA World Cup
Runner-up	1994 United States
UEFA European Championship
Runner-up	2000 Belgium–Netherlands
- * Club domestic league appearances and goals

Antonio Conte Cavaliere OMRI (Italian pronunciation: [anˈtɔːnjo ˈkonte]; born 31 July 1969) is an Italian professional football manager and former player. He has worked in Italy and England, with his most recent managerial stint being at Serie A club Napoli. He is widely regarded as one of the best football managers in the world.

Playing as a midfielder, Conte began his career at local club Lecce and later became one of the most decorated and influential players in the history of Juventus having won, among others, five Serie A titles, one Coppa Italia, one UEFA Champions League, and one UEFA Cup, also serving as the team's captain from 1996 until 2001. He also played for the Italy national team and was a participant at the 1994 FIFA World Cup and UEFA Euro 2000, where, on both occasions, Italy finished runners-up.

His managerial career started in 2006, leading Bari to a Serie B title, and Siena to promotion from the same division two years later. He took over at Juventus in 2011 and won three consecutive Serie A titles before taking charge of the Italy national team in 2014 until UEFA Euro 2016 where he led them to the quarter-finals. He then became Chelsea manager and led them to the Premier League title in his first season in charge, then winning the FA Cup in his second season but being dismissed as they finished fifth in the league. Conte joined Inter Milan a year later, leading the team to the UEFA Europa League final in his first season, then winning the 2020–21 Serie A title in his second season before stepping down in mutual consent. He joined Tottenham Hotspur in November 2021, but left in March 2023 by mutual consent. He joined Napoli in June 2024 and won the 2024–25 Serie A title in his first season, his fifth Scudetto and became the first manager to win the Italian league with three different clubs.

As a manager, Conte is associated with the revival of three-man defensive formations in the 2010s after they had seen limited use since their popularity in late 1990s Italian football.

== Playing career ==
=== Club career ===
==== Lecce ====
Conte began his career with the youth team of his hometown club Lecce and made his Serie A debut with the first team on 6 April 1986, aged 16, in a 1–1 draw against Pisa. Under manager Carlo Mazzone, he became a fundamental player for the squad. In 1987, he fractured his tibia, risking a career-ending injury. During the 1988–89 season, he was back on the pitch and scored his first Serie A goal on 11 November 1989 in a 3–2 loss to Napoli. He amassed 99 appearances and one goal for Lecce.

==== Juventus ====
Conte was signed by Juventus manager Giovanni Trapattoni in 1991 (Conte refers to Trapattoni as being his "second father"), debuting on 17 November 1991 against cross-city rivals Torino. Due to his consistent performances, work-rate, leadership and tenacious playing style, he became an important figure with the club's fans, and was later named the team's captain under Marcello Lippi in 1996, following the departure of the club's previous captain Gianluca Vialli, and before the promotion of Alessandro Del Piero to the role. During the 1998–99 season, when Del Piero suffered a severe knee injury, Conte returned to the captaincy, a position which he maintained until the 2001–02 season. During his Juventus playing career, Conte won five Serie A titles, the 1994–95 Coppa Italia, the 1992–93 UEFA Cup, the 1995–96 UEFA Champions League, four Supercoppa Italiana titles, the 1996 UEFA Super Cup, the 1996 Intercontinental Cup (which he missed due to injury), and the 1999 UEFA Intertoto Cup, winning all possible top-tier club titles, aside from the UEFA Cup Winners' Cup.

Conte's team finished as runner-up in the Champions League on three occasions, as Juventus lost the Champions League finals of 1997, 1998, and 2003. In the 2003 final, against AC Milan, he came on as a substitute in the second half and produced Juventus' best chance of the match, hitting the crossbar with a header, but Juventus eventually lost on penalties. Conte also finished runner-up in the 1995 UEFA Cup final with Juventus. He remained with Juventus until his retirement in 2004. During his 13 seasons with Juventus, he made 295 appearances and scored 29 goals in Serie A, and 418 appearances and 43 goals in all competitions.

=== International career ===
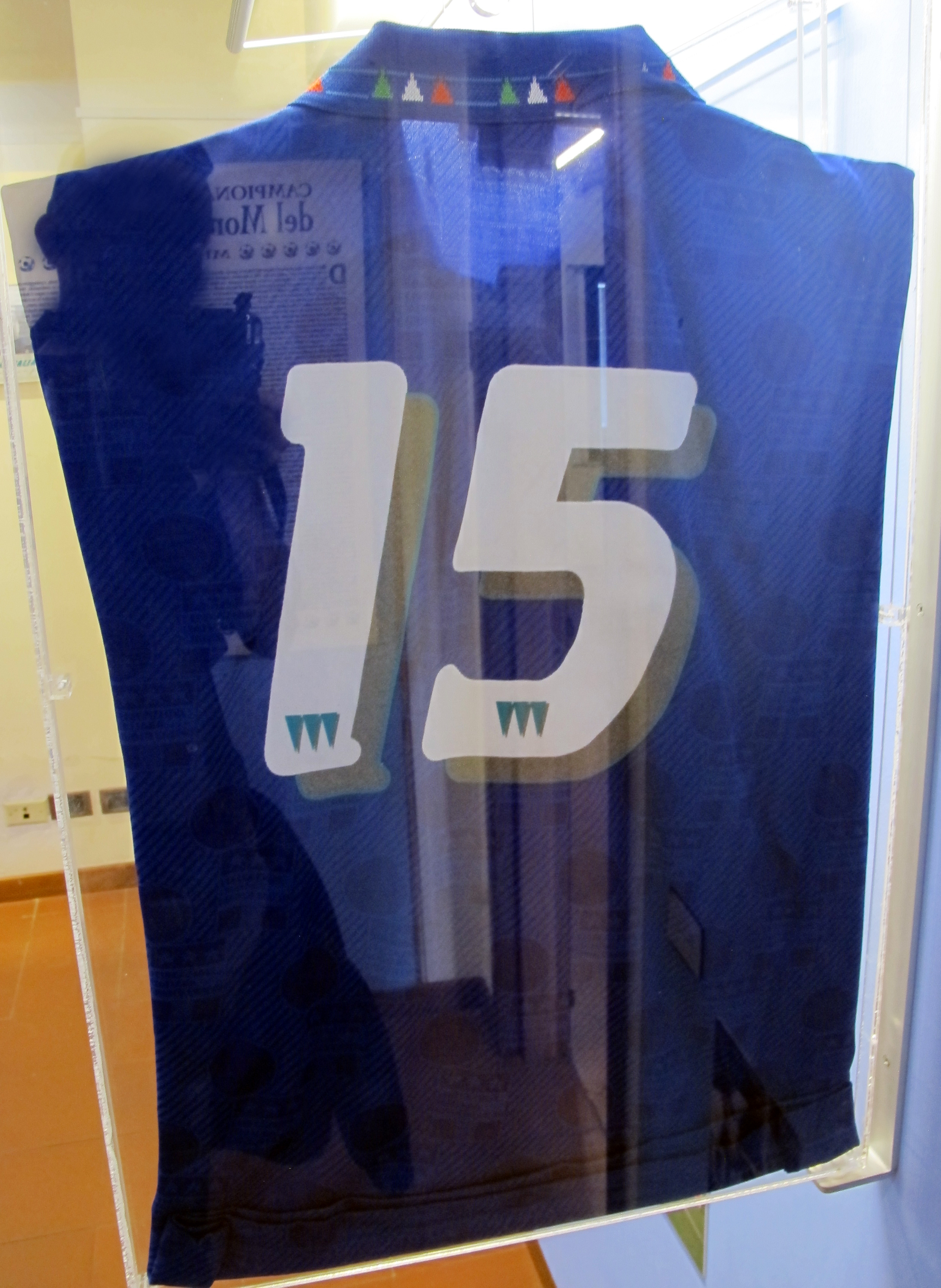
Conte's jersey from the 1994 FIFA World Cup, in which Italy reached the final

Conte also played for the Italy national team, making his debut on 27 May 1994, in a 2–0 friendly win over Finland at age 24, under Arrigo Sacchi. He was a member of the Italian squads for both the 1994 FIFA World Cup under Sacchi, and UEFA Euro 2000 under Dino Zoff, achieving runners-up medals in both tournaments. He missed out on the Euro 1996 squad after sustaining an injury in the 1996 Champions League final. Conte scored a bicycle kick in Italy's opening match of Euro 2000, which ended in a 2–1 win against Turkey, although he later suffered an injury in a 2–0 win against Romania in the quarter-finals of the competition, following a challenge from Gheorghe Hagi, which ruled him out for the remainder of the competition. In total, he made 20 international appearances for Italy between 1994 and 2000, scoring twice.

=== Style of play ===
Conte was regarded as a quick, combative, energetic, and tactically versatile footballer throughout his career who could play anywhere in midfield but was usually deployed as a central, box-to-box, or defensive midfielder, and occasionally on the right flank, due to his crossing ability. Although he was not the most naturally talented or skilful footballer from a technical standpoint (although he was able to improve in this area with time), Conte was a hard-working, consistent and intelligent player, with an innate ability to read the game, who was mainly known for his leadership, strong mentality, accurate tackling, stamina, and vision; these attributes, coupled with his solid first touch, work-rate, tenacity, and a tendency to make offensive runs into the area, enabled him to aid his team effectively both defensively and offensively, and gave him the ability to distribute the ball and start attacking moves after retrieving possession, as well as the capacity to turn defence into an attack. Due to his ball-striking from distance and ability to get forward, he also scored some spectacular and decisive goals, often from volleys and strikes from outside the area. He was also considered to be physically strong, good in the air and accurate with his head, despite not being particularly tall. Despite his ability as a footballer, his career was often affected by injuries.

== Coaching career ==
=== Arezzo ===
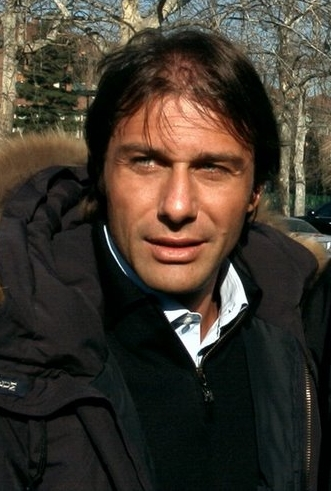
Conte in 2005

After retiring from playing, Conte worked as an assistant manager for Siena alongside Luigi De Canio in the 2005–06 season. In July 2006, he was appointed coach of Serie B side Arezzo. After a series of disappointing results, he was sacked on 31 October 2006.

On 13 March 2007, Conte was reinstated as Arezzo head coach as his predecessor Maurizio Sarri failed to gain any significant improvement with the club mired in a relegation struggle. He subsequently led the team to five consecutive wins, securing 19 points from 7 matches, which allowed the Tuscan side to close the points gap between them and safety. Despite this turnaround in form, Arezzo was relegated to Serie C1 on the final day of the league season, finishing one point behind Spezia.

=== Bari ===
On 27 December 2007, Conte was appointed by Bari to replace Giuseppe Materazzi for the second half of their 2007–08 Serie B campaign. He oversaw a considerable upturn in form, leading the team out of the relegation battle and placing them comfortably mid-table. The following season, 2008–09, Bari were crowned Serie B champions, being promoted to Serie A for the 2009–10 season, Conte's first major honour as a manager.

In June 2009, after weeks of rumours linking Conte to the vacant managerial role at Juventus, he agreed in principle for a contract extension to keep him at Bari for the new season. On 23 June, Bari announced they had rescinded the contract with Conte by mutual consent.

After Claudio Ranieri was sacked by Juventus, Conte was again reported to be a potential replacement. Shortly prior to Ranieri's termination, Conte had made public his ambition to be Juventus coach at some stage and was confident he was ready for the demands of the role. Again, Juventus declined to hire their former midfielder and appointed Ciro Ferrara instead.

=== Atalanta ===
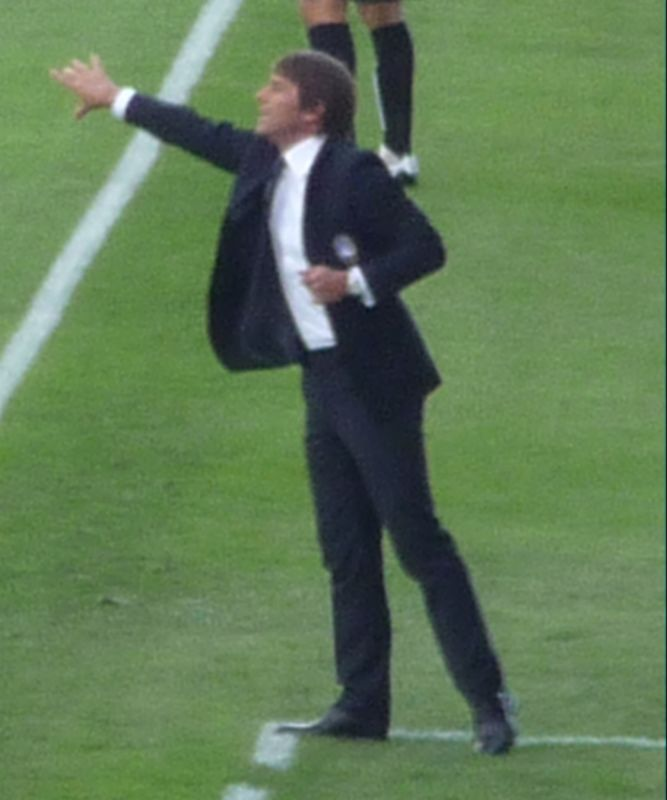
Conte managing Atalanta in a Serie A match

On 21 September 2009, Conte replaced Angelo Gregucci as manager of Atalanta. Despite a good start at the helm of the Orobici, the club found itself struggling by November, leading to protests from local supporters and friction between Conte and the club's ultra supporters.

On 6 January 2010, Conte was repeatedly confronted by Atalanta fans during a home game against Napoli which ended in a 0–2 defeat for the Nerazzurri. The match ended with Conte receiving police protection to avoid an altercation with the Atalanta ultras. The next day, Conte tendered his resignation to the club, leaving them in 19th place.

=== Siena ===
On 9 May 2010, Conte was announced as new head coach of Siena, with the aim of leading the Tuscan side back to the top flight after relegation to the 2010–11 Serie B. Conte successfully secured promotion for Siena, which would be competing in the 2011–12 Serie A season.

=== Juventus ===
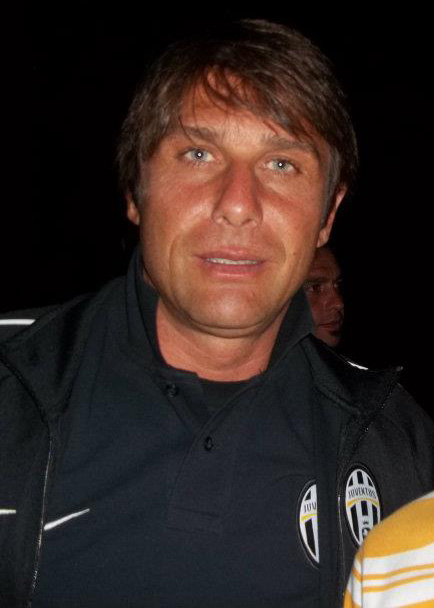
Conte with Juventus in 2012

On 22 May 2011, Juventus sporting director Giuseppe Marotta announced Juventus had appointed Conte as its new head coach, replacing Luigi Delneri. Conte arrived amid high expectations that he, a former fan favourite as a midfielder for the club, would lead them back to the summit of the Italian and European game.

His first ten months as manager saw the club reach a number of landmarks, such as following a 5–0 win over rivals Fiorentina, equalling Fabio Capello's run of 28 unbeaten matches between November 2005 and May 2006. On 20 March 2012, Conte became the first coach to lead Juventus to a Coppa Italia final since Marcello Lippi in the 2004 Coppa Italia final. On 25 March, following a 2–0 victory at the Juventus Stadium, he became the first coach to complete the league double in the Derby d'Italia against rivals Inter Milan since Capello in 2005–06. In November 2012, Conte was awarded the Trofeo Maestrelli, an award honouring the three best Italian coaches working in the professional league, the country's youth coaching system and outside Italy, respectively. Despite drawing a large number of matches during the season, on 6 May 2012 Conte led Juventus to their 28th league title with one match remaining by beating Cagliari 2–0. After beating Atalanta 3–1, Juventus finished the league unbeaten, the first team to do so since Serie A expanded to 20 teams and 38 rounds.

Conte's innovative 3–5–2 formation, which featured wingbacks and two box-to-box midfielders in a three-man midfield, gave more creative freedom to the newly acquired deep-lying playmaker Andrea Pirlo, who was key to the club's success that season. The club's strong and highly organised three-man back-line, which was predominantly composed of Giorgio Chiellini, Leonardo Bonucci, and Andrea Barzagli, was regarded to have played a large part in the title triumph, and only conceded 20 goals, finishing the league with the best defence in Italy. Juventus lost the 2012 Coppa Italia final to Napoli 2–0, their only defeat in domestic competitions that season.

Conte's Juventus won the 2012–13 Serie A title as they accumulated 87 points, three more than the previous season, nine more than second-placed Napoli and 15 more than third-placed Milan. Despite their dominance, Juventus' top goalscorers in the league were midfielder Arturo Vidal and forward Mirko Vučinić, both with just ten goals, making them joint 23rd in the goal-scoring chart. In his first Champions League campaign, Juventus was eliminated by eventual winners Bayern Munich in the quarter-finals, losing 4–0 on aggregate. After winning a second consecutive Supercoppa Italiana in 2013, Juventus won their third consecutive Serie A title under Conte during the 2013–14 season, winning the league with a Serie A record of 102 points. This was also the club's 30th league title. Juventus were eliminated from the group stage of the Champions League that season, although they subsequently managed to reach the semi-finals of the UEFA Europa League. On 15 July 2014, Conte resigned as manager. During his three seasons as Juventus manager, he won the Panchina d'Oro for each one, for best Serie A coach of the season.

=== Italy national team ===
On 14 August 2014, following Italy national team manager Cesare Prandelli's resignation, the Italian Football Federation (FIGC) announced to have agreed a two-year deal with Conte as new head coach of the national team until Euro 2016. With the national side, Conte continued to field formations which he had employed during his successful spell with Juventus, varying between the 4–3–3, 4–2–4, 3–3–4, and the 3–5–2 in particular, with the latter being the tactical choice that ultimately replaced Prandelli's 4–3–1–2 midfield diamond formation. His first match as Italy manager was a 2–0 win over Netherlands, during which Ciro Immobile and Daniele De Rossi scored the goals for Gli Azzurri. Conte won his first competitive match on 9 September 2014, defeating Norway 2–0 in their opening Euro 2016 qualifying match in Oslo, with goals by Simone Zaza and Leonardo Bonucci. This was the first time Italy had managed to defeat the Norwegians in Norway since 1937.

After ten matches as Italy manager, Conte suffered his first defeat on 16 June 2015, in a 1–0 international friendly loss against Portugal. He sealed Euro 2016 qualification for Italy on 10 October 2015, as Italy defeated Azerbaijan 3–1 in Baku. The result meant Italy had managed to go 50 matches unbeaten in European qualifiers.

On 15 March 2016, the FIGC confirmed Conte would step down as manager after Euro 2016. Although many fans and members of the media were initially critical of Conte's tactics and the level of the Italian squad chosen for the competition, Italy opened the tournament with a promising 2–0 victory over the number-one ranked European team Belgium on 13 June. Following the win, Conte drew praise from the media for the team's unity, defensive strength, and for his tactical approach to the match, which impeded Belgium from creating many goalscoring opportunities. Conte led Italy out of the group to the Round of 16 with one match to spare on 17 June after a 1–0 victory against Sweden. Italy had not won the second group match in a major international tournament since Euro 2000, in which Conte had coincidentally appeared as a player. Conte also led Italy to the top of the group, the first time in a major tournament since the 2006 World Cup. After the 2–0 round of 16 win over defending champions Spain, Conte's Italy then faced off against rivals and reigning world champions Germany in the quarter-final, which ended 1–1 after extra time and 6–5 in favour of Germany after the resulting penalty shoot-out, ending his time as Italy manager. Speaking after the match, Conte said, "[T]he decision to leave the national team after two years was taken early," and that the reason for leaving was because he "wanted to return to the cut and thrust of club football".

=== Chelsea ===
On 4 April 2016, it was confirmed Conte would officially become the new first-team head coach of English side Chelsea from the 2016–17 season after signing a three-year contract, which would keep him at the club until 2019. Conte maintained a strict approach when it comes to his players' diets, by limiting what could be served in the training centre's canteen, and having his players sleep at the Chelsea Harbour Hotel at Stamford Bridge the night before matches.

On 15 August, Chelsea started off the season with a 2–1 win over West Ham United. On 17 December, Conte set a new club record with 11 consecutive league victories in a single season, following a 1–0 away triumph over Crystal Palace. After securing a 4–2 home win over Stoke City on 31 December, Chelsea recorded a 13th consecutive league victory, equalling Arsenal's 2002 record for most consecutive league wins in a single season. The team's league winning streak came to an end in the following match, on 4 January 2017, in a 2–0 away loss to Tottenham Hotspur. On 13 January, Conte became the first manager in history to win three consecutive Premier League Manager of the Month awards (October, November and December). On 12 May, Conte's Chelsea side defeated West Bromwich Albion 1–0 away, with a late goal from substitute Michy Batshuayi, and secured the points required to win the 2016–17 Premier League title with two matches to spare. Following a 5–1 home win over Sunderland on 21 May, Chelsea also set a new Premier League record for the most wins in a single season, with 30 league victories out of 38 league matches. On 18 July, Conte signed a new two-year contract with Chelsea.

Conte was sent to the stands for the first time in his Chelsea career during the first half of a home match against Swansea City on 29 November. He argued with the fourth official Lee Mason over referee Neil Swarbrick's decision to award a goal kick rather than a corner for Chelsea, after which the referee dismissed him. Conte apologised afterwards but was nonetheless charged with misconduct by the FA.

On 19 May 2018, Conte led Chelsea to a 1–0 victory over Manchester United in the 2018 FA Cup final. Chelsea finished fifth in the league at the end of the season, missing out on Champions League qualification. Conte was sacked as Chelsea manager on 13 July and was replaced by Maurizio Sarri. The club reportedly had to pay £26.6m in compensation to Conte and his backroom staff for the early dismissal.

=== Inter Milan ===
On 31 May 2019, Conte was appointed head coach of Serie A club Inter Milan on a three-year contract. On 26 August 2019, Inter won their first league match of the season by 4–0 against Lecce. Inter finished second behind Juventus by just one point in the Serie A title race. Inter also reached the final of the Europa League, but suffered a 3–2 defeat to Sevilla in Cologne on 21 August 2020.

Following Atalanta's draw against Sassuolo on 2 May 2021, Inter were confirmed as Serie A champions for the first time in eleven years, ending Juventus' run of nine consecutive titles. Despite achieving Serie A glory, it was announced by Inter on 26 May that Conte had left the club by mutual consent. The departure was reportedly due to disagreements Conte had with the club's board over transfers for the following season.

=== Tottenham Hotspur ===
Conte was appointed as head coach of Tottenham Hotspur on 2 November 2021, following the sacking of Nuno Espírito Santo the previous day. He signed an 18-month contract with the option of a further year. His first match in-charge of Tottenham was a 3–2 win against Eredivisie side Vitesse. His first Premier League game was a 0–0 draw away to Everton on 7 November 2021. On 1 January 2022, following a late win against Watford, Conte became the first Tottenham manager to go unbeaten in their first eight league games.

Conte helped Tottenham qualify for the Champions League for the first time since 2019–20, after winning 5–0 away against Norwich City and finishing fourth in the 2021–22 Premier League season. After a 2–0 victory against Everton, Conte had secured Tottenham their best ever start to a Premier League season; however, Tottenham's form dipped following this, with the defence in particular struggling. In February 2023, Conte underwent surgery, and management responsibilities were temporarily handed over to assistant Cristian Stellini, who managed to earn a well-deserved 1–0 win against Manchester City. Conte returned to the Tottenham dugout for the club's following games, a 4–1 defeat to Leicester City and a 1–0 defeat to AC Milan. Following a check-up on 16 February, it was announced that Conte would be returning to Italy to further his recovery, with Stellini once again taking over his duties.

Because they are used to it here, they are used to it. They don't play for something important, yeah. They don't want to play under pressure, they don't want to play under stress. It is easy in this way. Tottenham's story is this. 20 years there is the owner and they never won something, but why? The fault is only for the club, or for every manager that stays here? I have seen the managers that Tottenham had on the bench. You risk to disrupt the figure of the manager and to protect the other situation in every moment.

— Conte, on the mentality of the players at Spurs.

On 18 March 2023, Conte gave a press conference following a 3–3 draw away to bottom of the league Southampton, after Tottenham conceded a 3–1 lead. Conte said that he sees "selfish players" that "don't put their heart [into it]", and intending to explain Spurs' current situation, he said: "Tottenham's story is this. Twenty years there is the owner and they never won something, but why? The fault is only for the club, or for every manager that stay[s] here?" Club captain Harry Kane and former midfielder Jamie O'Hara agreed with Conte that the club was in disarray. On 26 March, following exits in the Champions League as well as the FA Cup, it was announced by Tottenham that Conte had left the club by mutual consent. At the time of his departure, Tottenham were fourth in the Premier League, two points ahead of Newcastle United who had two games in hand.

=== Napoli ===
On 5 June 2024, Conte was officially appointed as the head coach of Serie A side Napoli, signing a three-year contract with the club, which was activated on 1 July.

On 23 May 2025, Conte led Napoli to their fourth Scudetto. It was Conte's fifth championship win in Italy as a coach and made him the first manager to win the Serie A title with three different clubs. For winning the league in his first season at the club, Conte was nominated for the 2025 Men's Coach of the Year at the 2025 Ballon d'Or.

On 22 December 2025, Napoli won their third Supercoppa Italiana title by defeating Coppa Italia holders Bologna 2–0 at the King Saud University Stadium in Riyadh. At the end of the 2025–26 season, Napoli finished runners-up to champions Inter Milan following a 1–0 home victory over Udinese on 24 May 2026. However, Conte left the club by mutual consent at the conclusion of the season.

== Style of management and reception ==
"The word 'coach' has to encompass everything. You can't only be good at tactics, just as you can't only be good at motivation, just as you can't only be good from a psychological point of view, just as you can't only be good in how you manage the club and the media. You have got to be good at everything. You have got to try and excel at everything. To do this you have got to study and since I became a coach, for me, it has been continuous study."

— Conte on his coaching philosophy.

"I did not have Zinedine Zidane or Roberto Baggio's talent as a player, and I have played with both, that even when they were circled they could try to break through or create interesting situations with the ball. When I was a player, my efforts and work-rate, my willingness to sacrifice fitness and humility made up for my lack of pure talent but sometimes, if I didn't find a teammate next to me, I might lose the ball. As a manager, my first thought from day one was that I wanted to find solutions for my players when the ball reached them, as I could not. If my players don't understand something, I force the player to ask me why we are doing such movement or working on certain tactics in training both offensively or defensively. I always want my players to be fully understanding of the problem. I want them to understand why we are doing certain things and why those things are useful."

— Conte on his use of tactical systems.

"My opinion about my colleague Conte is that he's superb, maybe he's the best. He was able to make Italy play beautiful football, Juventus too, in a culture where it's so defensive. He's an excellent manager, I learn a lot when I see his teams - Juventus, Italy and now [Chelsea]. I like to do that because you see what they want to do. Their teams control a lot of aspects. It's a good lesson for me to see his teams and learn."

— Manchester City manager Pep Guardiola has revealed that he has learned a lot from teams managed by Conte.

As a manager, Conte is known for using the 3–5–2 formation (or in certain cases, its more defensive variant, 5–3–2), fielding two wingbacks in lieu of wingers, with two out-and-out strikers backed by an attacking box-to-box midfielder in a three-man midfield, in front of a three-man defensive line. During his time as head coach of Juventus, he won three consecutive Serie A titles using the 3–5–2 formation, which also soon began to be employed by several other Serie A clubs. In his time at Bari, he was noted for his unorthodox 4–2–4 formation, a modification of the classic 4–4–2, in which the outside midfielders act as attacking wingers.

Some commentators have also observed that, although Conte's teams are capable of playing a short passing possession game, in which the ball is played out from the back on the ground, they are mainly known for their direct style of attacking play, as well as their ability to utilise long balls and score from counter-attacks with few touches; however, Conte has rejected claims that his teams prefer to sit back and play on the counter-attack. Defensive solidity has been highlighted as a hallmark of his sides, as well as the effective use of high and aggressive pressing in order to put pressure on opponents and win back the ball quickly. Conte's teams have also been described as possessing notable virtues such as pace, athleticism, high work-rates, versatility and tactical intelligence.

Conte's work in restoring Juventus to the top of Italian football won critical acclaim and earned him comparisons with José Mourinho, Marcello Lippi and Arrigo Sacchi, primarily due to his obsession with tactics, his winning mentality and ability to foster great team spirit among his players. He also demonstrated a notable tactical versatility and meticulousness as a coach, adopting several different formations in an attempt to find the most suitable system to match his players' skills. The formations he adopted included 4–2–4, 4–1–4–1, 3–3–4, and 4–3–3, before he finally settled on his now trademark 3–5–2 or 5–3–2 formation while also using a 3–5–1–1 formation on occasion, as a variation upon this system. The resulting system was key to the club's success as the three-man midfield line-up, flanked by wingbacks, allowed veteran star Andrea Pirlo to function creatively as a deep-lying playmaker, with the younger and more dynamic Arturo Vidal and Claudio Marchisio either supporting him defensively or contributing offensively by making attacking runs into the area. Conte's use of heavy pressing high up on the pitch allowed his players to win back the ball quickly after losing it, and enabled Juventus to dominate possession during matches, which gave Pirlo more time to orchestrate the team's attacking moves.

The organised back-line at Juventus formed by Chiellini, Bonucci, and Andrea Barzagli proved to be a strong defensive line-up, as Juventus finished the 2011–12 Serie A season with the best defence in the league; the three-man defence also allowed the central defender, Bonucci, to operate in a free role, and advance into midfield as a ball-playing centre-back, providing an additional creative outlet whenever Pirlo was heavily marked. Luca Marrone commented on Conte's demanding and meticulous approach as a coach, stating, "It takes time to accept the sheer amount of work he is asking of you. Everything he does, in preparation or tactical organisation, is done with maniacal precision and attention to detail. It can be overwhelming at first. But when you realise by buying into it you can win things, you follow."

In 2014, Trapattoni attributed Conte's success and tactical intelligence as a manager to his time playing in midfield throughout his playing career, which allowed him to understand both the offensive and defensive phases of the game.

Conte's teams are also known for their versatility and ability to adopt different formations during a match, depending on whether his team are in possession or playing off the ball. At Euro 2016, Italy adopted a fluid 3–5–2 formation under Conte, in which the wide midfielders or wingbacks effectively functioned as wingers in a 3–3–4 formation when attacking, and as fullbacks in a 5–3–2 formation when defending behind the ball. Although the level of talent in the Italian squad was initially criticised in the media, Conte's tactics and Italy's solidity and organisation, from both a defensive and offensive standpoint, drew praise from pundits.

In his first season as Chelsea manager, Conte started with a 4–1–4–1 formation, but after two comprehensive defeats to Arsenal and Liverpool early in the season, he changed the system to a fluid 3–4–2–1, with his trademark three-man defence consisting of David Luiz, César Azpilicueta, and Gary Cahill, two defensive-minded midfielders in N'Golo Kante and Nemanja Matić, two wing-backs equally capable at also playing as wingers (Victor Moses and Marcos Alonso), and a three-man attack spearheaded by striker Diego Costa and crucially assisted by outside forwards Eden Hazard and Pedro or Willian. This system depends on the constant positional movement of attacking players, with the two wide forwards moving inside when the full-backs make overlapping forward runs, thus effectively forming a 3–4–3 and at times a 3–4–1–2. When losing the ball, players' quick defensive transitions make the system easily transform into a compact 5–4–1. Chelsea's performances improved dramatically after the tactical change, with 13 consecutive wins in the Premier League, and the club eventually went on to win the league title that season. Conte drew praise for his role in revitalising the team in the media, with BBC pundit John Motson describing Chelsea's 5–0 home win against Everton on 5 November 2016 as the best 90-minute performance he had ever seen in the Premier League.

Although Conte's decision to reacquire David Luiz was initially met with criticism in the media, due to some poor defensive performances for Chelsea in the past, Conte's switch to a three-man back-line saw the Brazilian excel in a new role as a ball-playing centre-back, due to his technique and range of passing. Conte described David Luiz as being "crucial" to the team's success, and praised him for working to improve his composure and concentration. In addition to their tactical discipline and organisation, Chelsea also drew praise for their fitness, effective use of high pressing, and their ability to win the ball back quickly, as well as their work-rate under Conte, which was attributed to the team's highly rigorous preseason training, which Cahill described as one of the "hardest" he has ever experienced.

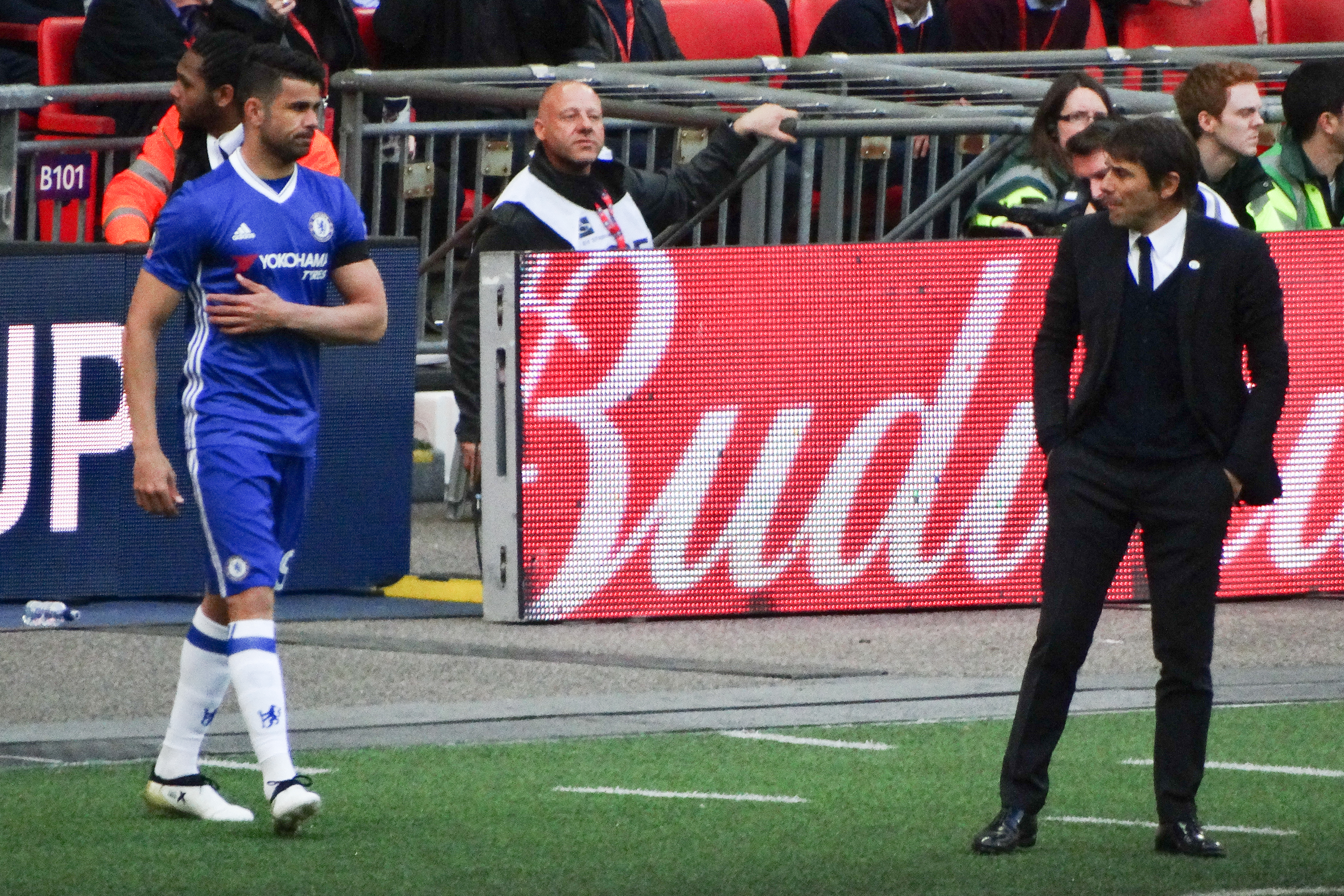
Conte with Diego Costa during the 2017 FA Cup semi-final against Tottenham

Italy defender Leonardo Bonucci singled out Conte for his role in motivating the players and creating a unified team environment at Euro 2016, commenting that the players had given their coach the nickname The Godfather, for the way he made them want to listen when he spoke. Pirlo has also remarked approvingly of Conte's man-management and motivational skills. In his autobiography he recalled how Conte's introductory speech to the Juventus squad left a significant impression on him: "He needed only one speech, with many simple words, to conquer both me and Juventus. He had fire running through his veins and he moved like a viper. 'This squad, dear boys, is coming off two consecutive seventh-place finishes. It's crazy. It's shocking. I am not here for this, so it's time to stop being so crap.'... When Conte speaks, his words assault you. They crash through the doors of your mind. I've lost count of the number of times I've said: 'Hell, Conte said something really spot-on again today.'"

In addition to his comparisons to José Mourinho, some commentators have also remarked on his managerial similarities to Sir Alex Ferguson, using an anecdote from his final season as Juventus manager to illustrate his formidable temper. Prior to the team talk ahead of the final game of the 2013–14 season, Juventus goalkeeper Gianluigi Buffon arrived with the club's chief executive who Buffon said wanted to speak to the players over how much they were due in win bonuses having won the title. "The suggestion sent Conte into a fury. He chased every player out of the room as he tore into Buffon. 'I don't want to hear another word,' Conte is said to have screamed. 'From you, of all people, I would never have expected such a thing. Bonuses ... You're a disappointment, a defeat from the moment you open your mouth. Just like all the rest of these half-wits.'" Juventus won the game 3–0 and set a new record for the most points and wins in a single Serie A season; this explained Conte's pre-game outburst as he was aiming for these records despite having already clinched the Scudetto. Conte is also known for adopting a very strict approach when it comes to his players' diets and curfew before matches. Marcello Lippi has also praised Conte for his leadership qualities as a manager.

Despite his multiple league successes as a manager, Conte has been criticized in the media for his poor European records, particularly in the UEFA Champions League, where he has passed the round of 16 only once.

=== Controversies ===
Prior to Euro 2012, Conte was accused of failure to report attempted match-fixing during his time as manager of Siena by ex-Siena player Filippo Carobbio, connected with the betting scandal of 2011–12. Carobbio, after himself being charged with extensive involvement in the scandal, said that during the technical meeting prior to a match between Siena and Novara, Siena owner Massimo Mezzaroma indirectly sent a message to the players asking them to ensure the match finished in a draw in order to help Mezzaroma turn a large profit on a bet he had made. The match finished 2–2, and Carobbio testified that Conte was present when the message was relayed to the players in advance of the match. Carrobio also asserted the result of the final match of the season, in which Siena lost 1–0 to AlbinoLeffe, was prearranged after Siena's assistant manager asked he and another player "contact someone at AlbinoLeffe to reach an agreement over the return match". Further accusations were also leveled at Conte over Siena's 5–0 victory over Varese that season, specifically that he knew they had been asked to lose the game and did not report it.

Conte's lawyer, Antonio De Rencis, reported his client strenuously denied the accusations, and maintained he had no knowledge of any attempts to fix the matches in which he was involved. To date, none of the 23 other Siena players have supported Carobbio's accusations. Conte took the advice of his lawyers and attempted to strike a plea bargain, which would have seen him served with a three-month ban and fine of €200,000, under Article 23 of Italian law without admission of guilt. On 1 August 2012, this plea bargain was rejected. On 10 August, the FIGC suspended him from football for the following ten months for failing to report match-fixing in the Novara–Siena and AlbinoLeffe–Siena fixtures. Conte again maintained his innocence and appealed the verdict.

On 22 August 2012, the Federal Court of Justice dropped the accusation about the Novara–Siena fixture. Federal Court member Pietro Sandulli commented, "[I]t seemed illogical that such a senior and experienced coach would say in the locker room 'we're drawing this one' in front of 25 players." The Court confirmed the ten-month ban for the AlbinoLeffe match would be upheld as there was no way he could not have known of the actions of his assistant manager Cristian Stellini, with the presiding judge adding that Conte was lucky not to have been handed a longer sentence. The next day, Juventus announced an appeal to Italy's sports arbitration panel against the ban. Following the appeal, Conte's touchline ban was reduced to four months.

Juventus' management and players dedicated their Supercoppa Italiana win to Conte. In May 2016, the preliminary hearing judge of the court of Cremona acquitted Conte of all charges in regard to his alleged involvement in the match-fixing scandal from the 2010–11 season, during his time with Siena in Serie B.

Despite Conte's success at Juventus, there were indications that his departure from the club in May 2014 was not as amicable as had been portrayed, with observers pointing to a comment he made in the immediate aftermath of the club's 2014 title success. When asked what plans were in place for the following season, Conte responded, "Well, you cannot go to eat at a €100 restaurant with just €10 in your pocket, can you?", which was interpreted as a veiled criticism of the lack of funds made available for transfers by the Juventus executive. In addition to this remark, Conte had chosen to resign on the second day of pre-season training, something that took fans by surprise.

== Personal life ==
Conte was raised in Lecce with his two brothers by their parents, father Cosimino Conte and mother Ada Briamo. His father was a football coach for local club Juventina Lecce.

Conte and his wife Elisabetta have a daughter, Vittoria. The couple had been together for 15 years before marrying in June 2013. Conte has expressed his gratitude to his family for their support during the Scommessopoli match-fixing scandal investigations in 2011–12: "I have a great woman by my side, one who always tries to understand me. As for my daughter, she is the other woman in my life. She is beginning to understand that her dad gets nervous when he does not win [a match]."

Conte is bilingual in Italian and English. He is Catholic. On 1 February 2023, Tottenham Hotspur announced Conte would be having surgery that day to remove his gallbladder.

== Career statistics ==
=== Club ===
Appearances and goals by club, season and competition
Club	Season	League			Coppa Italia		Europe		Other		Total	
Club	Season	Division	Apps	Goals	Apps	Goals	Apps	Goals	Apps	Goals	Apps	Goals
Lecce	1985–86	Serie A	2	0	—		—		—		2	0
Lecce	1986–87	Serie B	0	0	2	0	—		—		2	0
Lecce	1987–88	Serie B	2	0	2	0	—		—		4	0
Lecce	1988–89	Serie A	19	0	2	0	—		—		21	0
Lecce	1989–90	Serie A	28	1	1	0	—		—		29	1
Lecce	1990–91	Serie A	22	0	2	0	—		—		24	0
Lecce	1991–92	Serie B	8	0	2	1	—		—		10	1
Lecce	Total		81	1	11	1	—		—		92	2
Juventus	1991–92	Serie A	15	0	6	0	—		—		21	0
Juventus	1992–93	Serie A	31	2	6	0	10 (Note: Appearances in UEFA Cup)	1	—		47	3
Juventus	1993–94	Serie A	32	4	1	0	8	0	—		41	4
Juventus	1994–95	Serie A	23	1	4	0	5	2	—		32	3
Juventus	1995–96	Serie A	29	5	2	0	9 (Note: Appearances in UEFA Champions League)	2	1 (Note: Appearance in Supercoppa Italiana)	0	41	7
Juventus	1996–97	Serie A	6	0	1	1	3	0	—		10	1
Juventus	1997–98	Serie A	28	4	6	1	9	0	1	1	44	6
Juventus	1998–99	Serie A	29	4	2	0	6	3	1 (Note: Appearance in UEFA Cup play-offs)	0	38	7
Juventus	1999–2000	Serie A	28	4	2	1	8 (Note: Four appearances and one goal in UEFA Cup, four appearances and one goal in UEFA Intertoto Cup)	2	—		38	7
Juventus	2000–01	Serie A	21	2	2	1	5	0	—		28	3
Juventus	2001–02	Serie A	20	1	5	0	4	0	—		29	1
Juventus	2002–03	Serie A	18	1	2	0	7	0	—		27	1
Juventus	2003–04	Serie A	16	1	4	0	4	0	0	0	24	1
Juventus	Total		296	29	43	4	78	10	3	1	420	44
Career total			377	30	54	5	78	10	3	1	512	46

=== International ===
Appearances and goals by national team and year
National team	Year	Apps	Goals
Italy	1994	3	0
Italy	1995	2	0
Italy	1996	3	0
Italy	1999	7	1
Italy	2000	5	1
Total		20	2

Scores and results list Italy's goal tally first.

List of international goals scored by Antonio Conte
No.	Date	Venue	Opponent	Score	Result	Competition
1	27 March 1999	Parken Stadium, Copenhagen, Denmark	Denmark	2–1	2–1	UEFA Euro 2000 qualification
2	11 June 2000	GelreDome, Arnhem, Netherlands	Turkey	1–0	2–1	UEFA Euro 2000

== Managerial statistics ==
As of match played 24 May 2026

Managerial record by team and tenure
Team	Nat.	From	To	Record								
Team	Nat.	From	To	G	W	D	L	GF	GA	GD	Win %	Ref
Arezzo	(Italy)	1 July 2006	31 October 2006	12	1	7	4	4	10	−6	8.33	
Arezzo	(Italy)	13 March 2007	12 June 2007	15	8	3	4	22	17	+5	53.33	
Bari	(Italy)	27 December 2007	23 June 2009	67	32	22	13	98	63	+35	47.76	
Atalanta	(Italy)	21 September 2009	7 January 2010	14	3	4	7	14	21	−7	21.43	
Siena	(Italy)	23 May 2010	30 May 2011	44	22	14	8	71	38	+33	50.00	
Juventus	(Italy)	31 May 2011	15 July 2014	151	102	34	15	280	101	+179	67.55	
Italy	(Italy)	14 August 2014	2 July 2016	25	14	7	4	34	21	+13	56.00	
Chelsea	(England)	3 July 2016	13 July 2018	106	69	17	20	212	102	+110	65.09	
Inter Milan	(Italy)	31 May 2019	26 May 2021	102	64	23	15	214	102	+112	62.75	
Tottenham Hotspur	(England)	2 November 2021	26 March 2023	76	41	12	23	136	85	+51	53.95	
Napoli	(Italy)	5 June 2024	24 May 2026	91	52	22	17	138	83	+55	57.14	
Career Total				703	408	165	130	1,223	646	+577	58.04	

== Honours ==
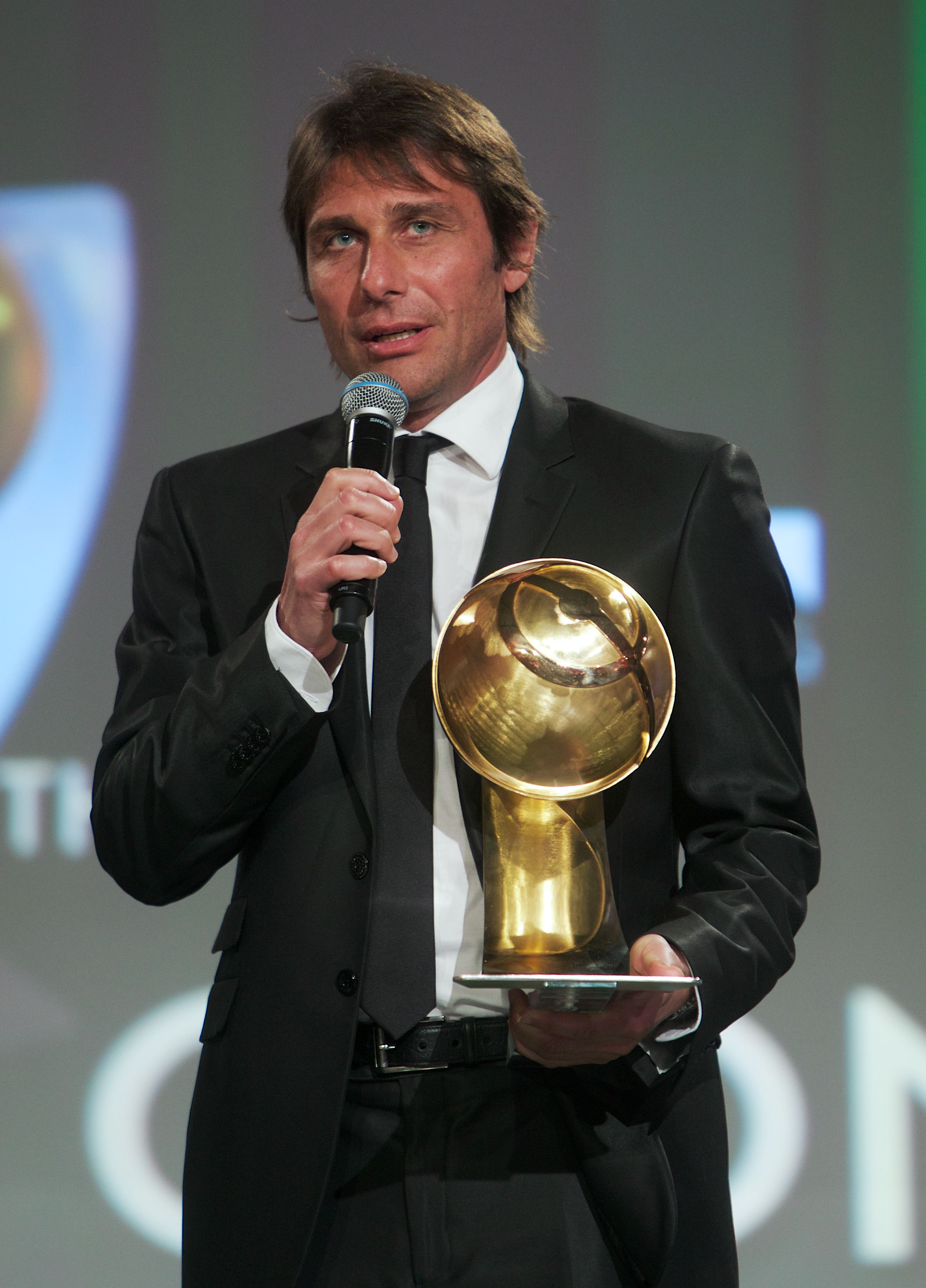
Conte collecting the Globe Soccer Awards Best Coach of the Year award (2013)

=== Player ===
Juventus

- Serie A: 1994–95, 1996–97, 1997–98, 2001–02, 2002–03
- Coppa Italia: 1994–95
- Supercoppa Italiana: 1995, 1997, 2003
- UEFA Champions League: 1995–96; runner-up: 1996–97, 1997–98, 2002–03
- UEFA Cup: 1992–93; runner-up: 1994–95
- UEFA Intertoto Cup: 1999

Italy

- FIFA World Cup runner-up: 1994
- UEFA European Championship runner-up: 2000

Individual

- Juventus FC Hall of Fame: 2025

=== Manager ===
Bari

- Serie B: 2008–09

Juventus

- Serie A: 2011–12, 2012–13, 2013–14
- Supercoppa Italiana: 2012, 2013

Chelsea

- Premier League: 2016–17
- FA Cup: 2017–18; runner-up: 2016–17

Inter Milan

- Serie A: 2020–21
- UEFA Europa League runner-up: 2019–20

Napoli

- Serie A: 2024–25
- Supercoppa Italiana: 2025–26

Individual

- Panchina d'Argento: 2008–09
- Panchina d'Oro: 2011–12, 2012–13, 2013–14, 2020–21, 2024–25
- Serie A Coach of the Year: 2011–12, 2012–13, 2013–14, 2020–21, 2024–25
- Trofeo Tommaso Maestrelli for the Best Italian Manager: 2011–12
- Globe Soccer Award for the Best Coach of the Year: 2013
- IFFHS Best Club Coach of the Year Nominee: 2013 (7th)
- Gazzetta Sports Awards Coach of the Year: 2015, 2021
- Premier League Manager of the Month: October 2016, November 2016, December 2016
- London Football Awards for Manager of the Year: 2017
- Premier League Manager of the Season: 2016–17
- LMA Manager of the Year: 2016–17
- Special Achievement GQ Men of the Year Award: 2017
- The Best FIFA Men's Coach (2nd Place): 2017
- Italian Football Hall of Fame: 2021
- Serie A Coach of the Month: September 2024, January 2025
- Serie A Most Valuable Coach: 2024–25

=== Orders ===
- Knight of the Order of Merit of the Italian Republic: 2000

== See also ==
- List of FA Cup winning managers
