= Serie A Coach of the Year =

Italian football award

- Sport: Association football
- Competition: Serie A
- Awarded for: The outstanding manager in each given Serie A season
- Local name: Migliore allenatore AIC (Italian)
- Country: Italy
- Presented by: Italian Footballers' Association (AIC)

History
- First award: 1997
- Editions: 30
- First winner: Marcello Lippi (1997)
- Most wins: Antonio Conte (5)
- Most recent: Cesc Fàbregas (2026)
- Website: Official website

The AIC Serie A Coach of the Year (Italian: Migliore allenatore AIC) is a yearly award organized by the Italian Footballers' Association (AIC) given to the coach who has been considered to have performed the best over the previous Serie A season. The award is part of the Gran Galà del Calcio (formerly known as the "Oscar del Calcio AIC") awards event.

Juventus coaches have won the most awards, with eleven. Only three non-Italians have won the award: Sven-Göran Eriksson of Sweden became the first in 2000, José Mourinho of Portugal was the first foreign coach to win the award twice, and Cesc Fàbregas of Spain was the third in 2026. Antonio Conte has won the award a record five times.

== History ==
The inaugural award, given at the "Oscar del Calcio AIC" ceremony, was presented after the conclusion of the 1996–97 Serie A season to Marcello Lippi who had led Juventus to the title, winning Serie A by two points ahead of Parma. Juventus also won the 1996 UEFA Champions League Final that year, against Ajax. Lippi retained the Coach of the Year award the following season, when Juventus secured the domestic title again, yet lost the Champions League Final to "perennial German underdogs" Borussia Dortmund. Milan, led by Alberto Zaccheroni, won the league in the 1998–99 season, and he became the second individual recipient of the Coach of the Year award. Sweden's Sven-Göran Eriksson managed Lazio to their first league title since 1974 when they topped the league in the 1999–2000 season. Further success in both the UEFA Super Cup and the Coppa Italia ensured that Eriksson was named the first non-Italian Serie A Coach of the Year.

Carlo Ancelotti won the award with Juventus in the 2000–01 season, becoming the first coach to do so despite having not won the league, finishing runners-up behind Roma by two points. The following season, a fifth-place finish from newly promoted Chievo, and subsequent qualification for the 2002–03 UEFA Cup, ensured the Coach of the Year was awarded to Luigi Delneri. Lippi became the first coach to win the award on three occasions following the 2002–03 season – he led Juventus to win Serie A, the Supercoppa and to a narrow defeat (on penalties) in the first all-Italian Champions League Final. The 2003–04 season saw Milan claim their first Serie A title in five years, finishing eleven points ahead of nearest rivals Roma. Milan's coach, Ancelotti, was presented with his second Coach of the Year award in four seasons. Fabio Capello won the award following the 2004–05 season in which he led Juventus to league success. He later resigned in the wake of the Calciopoli match-fixing scandal and Juventus were stripped of their title and relegated to Serie B.

Luciano Spalletti, the Roma coach, won the award for the next two seasons. Roma finished fifth in the 2005–06 season but were later elevated to second following the disqualification of clubs after the Calciopoli scandal. Roma also made it to the final of the Coppa Italia but were defeated 4–1 on aggregate by Internazionale. In the 2006–07 season, Spalletti led Roma to runners-up in Serie A and to win the Coppa Italia. A fourth place league finish for ACF Fiorentina and an appearance in the semi-finals of the 2007–08 UEFA Cup saw Cesare Prandelli as recipient of the Coach of the Year award in 2008. Portuguese coach José Mourinho became the second non-Italian to win the award when he led Internazionale to the Serie A title in the 2008–09 season, along with victory in the 2008 Supercoppa Italiana. He retained the award after the following season in which Internazionale not only retained their domestic title but won the Coppa Italia and the Champions League.

Milan appointed Massimiliano Allegri as their new coach for the 2010–11 season. Having led the club to league success and the semi-finals of the Coppa Italia, he was awarded the Coach of the Year title, presented at the "Gran Galà del Calcio" which replaced the previous ceremony. The following season, another newly appointed manager won the award. Former player Antonio Conte succeeded Delneri as Juventus manager and led the club to their first league title in nine years, along with a losing appearance in the final of the Coppa Italia. Conte won the Coach of the Year award the following two seasons – Juventus defended their league title in the 2012–13 season along with winning the Supercoppa, and repeated that feat in the 2013–14 season. Leaving to manage the Italy national team, Conte was replaced by Allegri who secured the league title, the Coppa Italia, and runners-up spots in both the Supercoppa and the Champions League. Allegri led Juventus to their fifth consecutive Serie A title in the 2015–16 season, also winning both the Supercoppa and the Coppa Italia, and retained the Coach of the Year trophy.

In the 2016–17 Serie A, Maurizio Sarri led Napoli to a convincing third place, scoring the most goals in the league and obtaining the club's record points tally up to that point (83), which earned him the award. The following year, the Coach of the Year title went back to Allegri for a record fourth time, having won his fourth double (Scudetto and Coppa Italia) with Juventus. In the 2018–19 season, another non-title winner manager, Gian Piero Gasperini, was awarded following a season where Atalanta reached the Coppa Italia final after 23 years, though losing to Lazio, and qualified to the Champions League for the first time in their history. Gasperini won the award again the following season after having achieved Atalanta's highest points tally ever in Serie A (78). In the 2020–21 season, Antonio Conte won the award (his fourth in total) after having led Inter Milan to the Scudetto win, breaking an eleven-year draught of championships for Inter and ending a nine-year long streak by Juventus.

In the 2021–22 season, Italian coach Stefano Pioli won his first award after leading AC Milan to their first Italian Serie A title in 11 years. In the 2022–23 season, Luciano Spalletti received his third award for bringing the Scudetto back to Napoli after a 33-year gap since their previous victory. In the 2023–24 season, Simone Inzaghi won his first award after leading Inter to their twentieth Italian Serie A title. In the 2024–25 season, Antonio Conte won the award for a record fifth time after leading Napoli to another league title, the club's second Scudetto in three years. In the 2025–26 season, Cesc Fàbregas received the Coach of the Year award after guiding Como to a fourth-place finish and their first-ever qualification for the UEFA Champions League, while setting new club Serie A records for wins, points and goals scored.

== List of winners ==
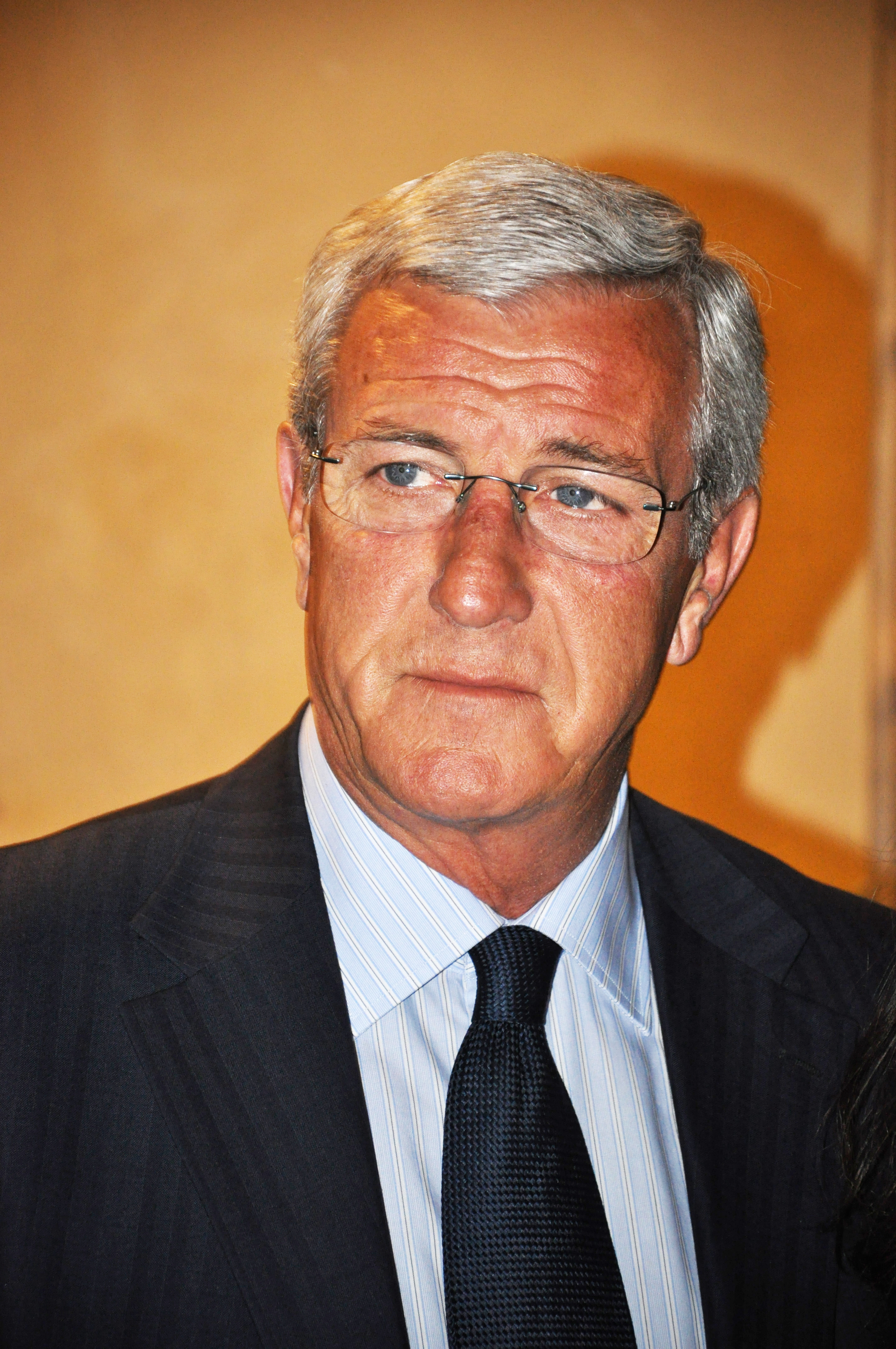
Marcello Lippi won the inaugural award in 1997 and went on to win two further awards in 1998 and 2003, all with Juventus.

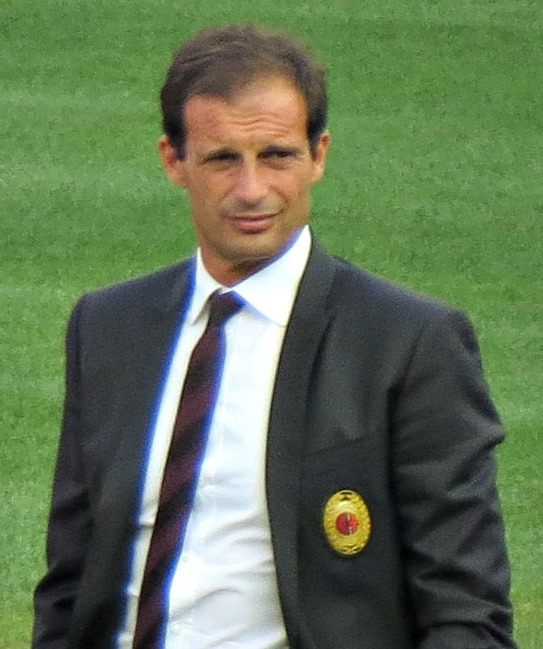
Massimiliano Allegri won four awards in total.

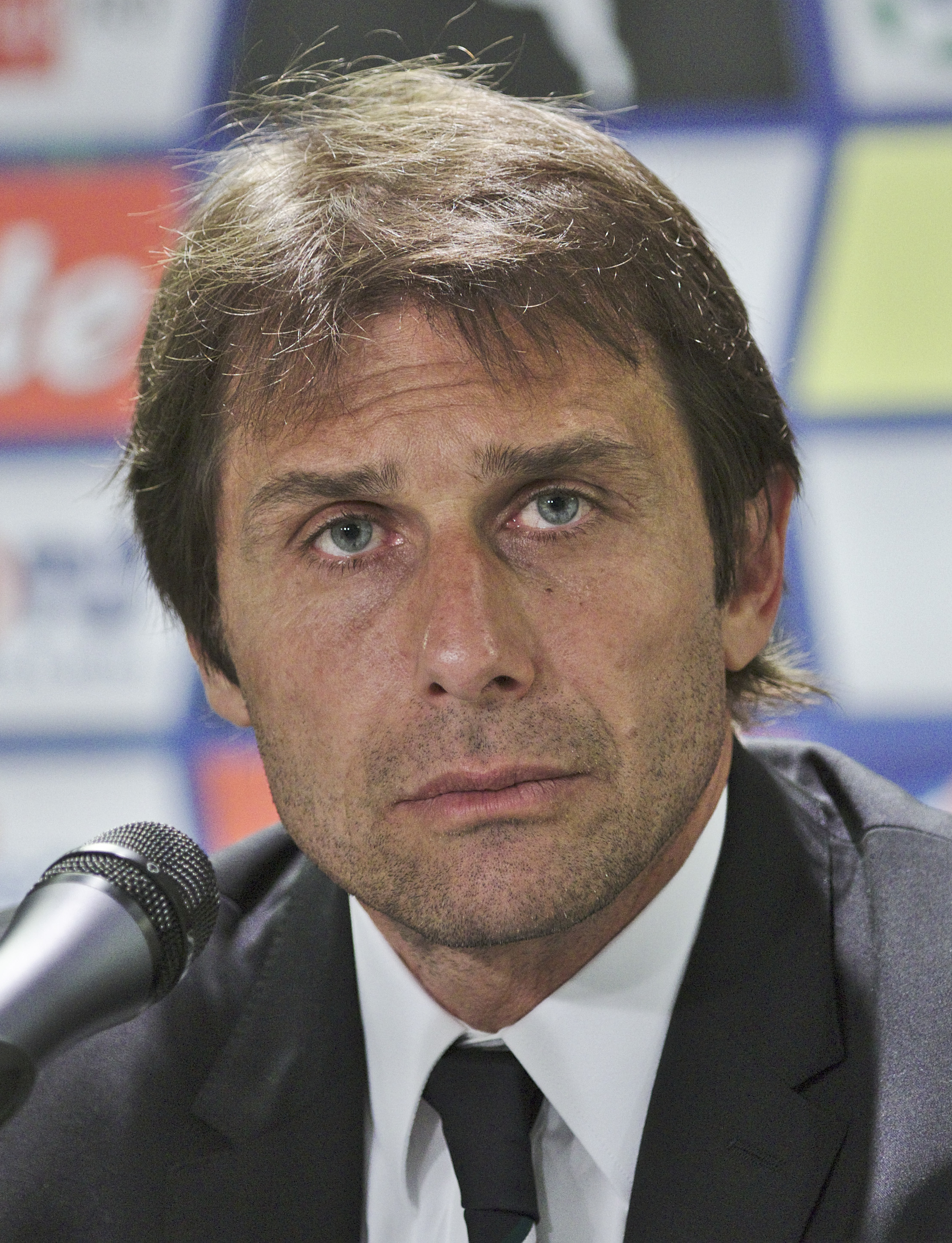
Antonio Conte has won the award a record five times, including in three consecutive years.

Key
§	Denotes the club were Serie A champions in the same season

List of Serie A Coach of the Year recipients
Year	Coach	Nationality	Club	Ref(s)
1996–97	Marcello Lippi	Italy	Juventus^{§}	
1997–98	Marcello Lippi (2)	Italy	Juventus^{§}	
1998–99	Alberto Zaccheroni	Italy	Milan^{§}	
1999–2000	Sven-Göran Eriksson	Sweden	Lazio^{§}	
2000–01	Carlo Ancelotti	Italy	Juventus	
2001–02	Luigi Delneri	Italy	Chievo	
2002–03	Marcello Lippi (3)	Italy	Juventus^{§}	
2003–04	Carlo Ancelotti (2)	Italy	Milan^{§}	
2004–05	Fabio Capello	Italy	Juventus	
2005–06	Luciano Spalletti	Italy	Roma	
2006–07	Luciano Spalletti (2)	Italy	Roma	
2007–08	Cesare Prandelli	Italy	Fiorentina	
2008–09	José Mourinho	Portugal	Internazionale^{§}	
2009–10	José Mourinho (2)	Portugal	Internazionale^{§}	
2010–11	Massimiliano Allegri	Italy	Milan^{§}	
2011–12	Antonio Conte	Italy	Juventus^{§}	
2012–13	Antonio Conte (2)	Italy	Juventus^{§}	
2013–14	Antonio Conte (3)	Italy	Juventus^{§}	
2014–15	Massimiliano Allegri (2)	Italy	Juventus^{§}	
2015–16	Massimiliano Allegri (3)	Italy	Juventus^{§}	
2016–17	Maurizio Sarri	Italy	Napoli	
2017–18	Massimiliano Allegri (4)	Italy	Juventus^{§}	
2018–19	Gian Piero Gasperini	Italy	Atalanta	
2019–20	Gian Piero Gasperini (2)	Italy	Atalanta	
2020–21	Antonio Conte (4)	Italy	Internazionale^{§}	
2021–22	Stefano Pioli	Italy	Milan^{§}	
2022–23	Luciano Spalletti (3)	Italy	Napoli^{§}	
2023–24	Simone Inzaghi	Italy	Internazionale^{§}	
2024–25	Antonio Conte (5)	Italy	Napoli^{§}	
2025–26	Cesc Fàbregas	Spain	Como	

=== By nationality ===
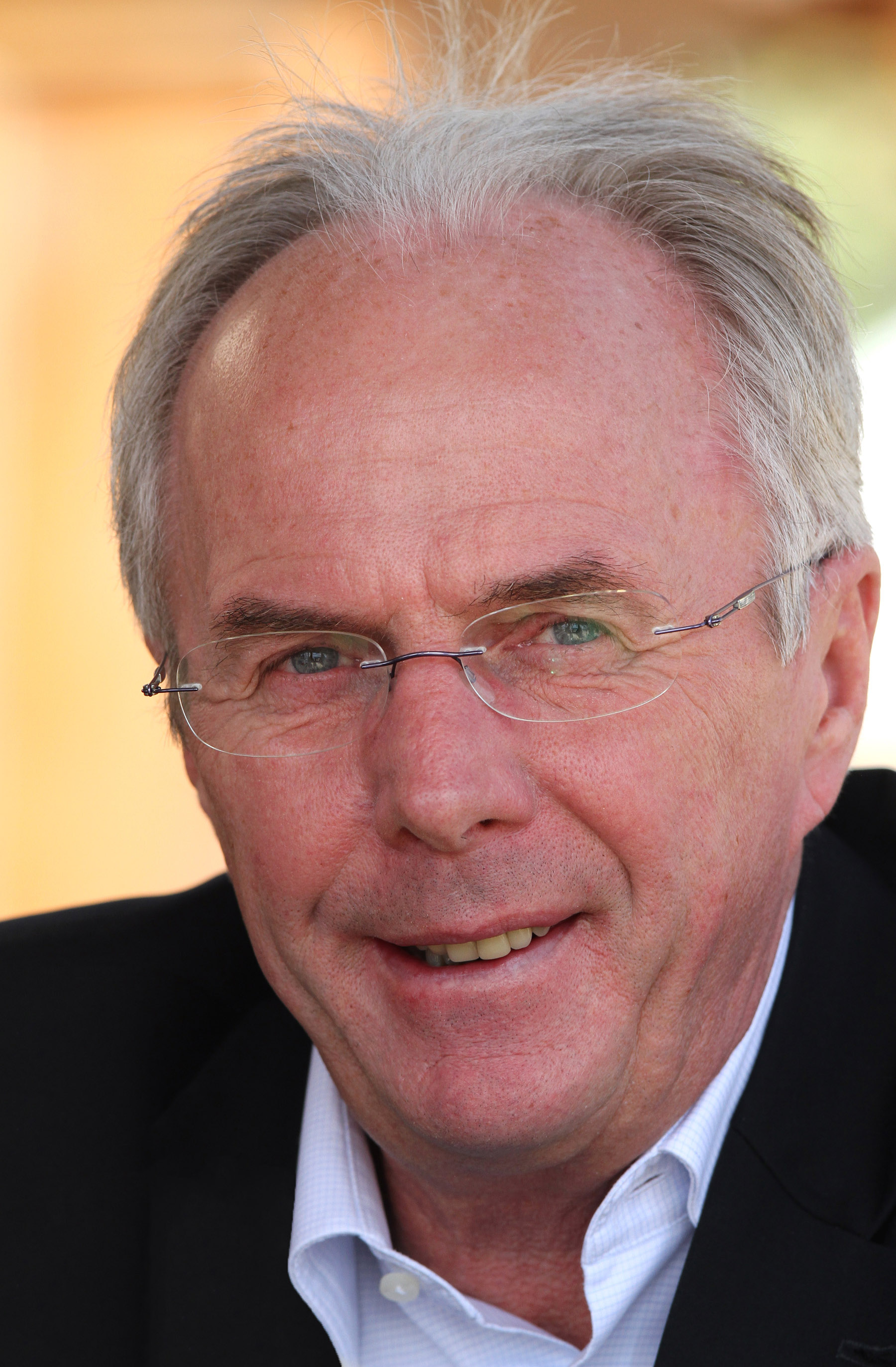
Sven-Göran Eriksson is one of only three non-Italian winners of the Serie A Coach of the Year title.

As of 2026, Sven-Göran Eriksson (Sweden), José Mourinho (Portugal) and Cesc Fàbregas (Spain) are the only non-Italian coaches to win the title.

Country	Coaches	Total
Italy	13	26
Portugal	1	2
Spain	1	1
Sweden	1	1

=== By club ===
Coaches of Juventus have won the most awards, with eleven in total.

Club	Coaches	Total
Juventus	5	11
Internazionale	3	4
Milan	4	4
Napoli	3	3
Roma	1	2
Atalanta	1	2
Chievo	1	1
Como	1	1
Fiorentina	1	1
Lazio	1	1

== See also ==
- Panchina d'Oro
