= Vincenzo Vivarini =

Italian football coach

Personal information
- Date of birth: 2 January 1966 (age 60)
- Place of birth: Ari, Italy

Managerial career
- Years: Team
- 2007–2008: Luco Canistro
- 2008–2009: Renato Curi Angolana
- 2009–2011: Chieti
- 2011–2013: Aprilia
- 2013–2016: Teramo
- 2016–2017: Latina
- 2017: Empoli
- 2018–2019: Ascoli
- 2019–2020: Bari
- 2020–2021: Virtus Entella
- 2021–2024: Catanzaro
- 2024: Frosinone
- 2025: Pescara
- 2025–2026: Bari

Vincenzo Vivarini (born 2 January 1966) is an Italian professional football coach.

== Coaching career ==
Vivarini started his coaching career working as an assistant with Giulianova and Pescara. He took his first head-coaching role in 2007 with amateur Luco Canistro. In 2008, he took over at Serie D club Renato Curi Angolana, leading the club to seventh place.

He successively guided Chieti, leading them to win the Serie D title in his first season and then to sixth place in the Serie C2. This was followed by a two-year stint at another Serie C2 club, Aprilia, where he also won a promotion playoff qualification during his stay.

In 2013, he became the new head coach of Serie C1 club Teramo, guiding them to a historical first promotion to Serie B in 2015; the Italian football federation however revoked this after Teramo was found guilty of match-fixing, with the club relegated back to Lega Pro as a consequence. Despite that, he was awarded the Panchina d'Oro for best Lega Pro coach for the 2014–15 season.

Vivarini stayed in charge of Teramo until June 2016, when he left the club to accept an offer from Serie B club Latina. He failed to avoid relegation with Latina, also due to the club being in financial struggles that successively led to its exclusion from professionalism later in July 2017.

He was successively named new head coach of promotion candidates Empoli for the 2017–18 Serie B campaign, but was dismissed later in December due to poor results and replaced by Aurelio Andreazzoli.

On 12 July 2018, he signed a two-year contract as the new coach of Ascoli in Serie B. He was dismissed by Ascoli on 5 June 2019.

On 24 September 2019, he signed a two-year contract with Serie C club Bari. After failing to lead the club to promotion following defeat to Reggiana in the playoff final, he left Bari by mutual consent at the end of the season.

On 25 November 2020, he was appointed at the helm of Serie B club Virtus Entella. He was sacked on 12 April 2021, leaving Virtus Entella in last place, ten points below the relegation playoff zone, with only five games left.

On 30 November 2021, he was hired by Serie C club Catanzaro. After concluding the 2021–22 Serie C season in second place behind league winners Bari, Vivarini guided Catanzaro to promotion to Serie B in the following campaign, with a very offensive team that achieved 96 points and scored over 100 goals throughout the regular season. He was successfully confirmed in charge of Catanzaro for the club's 2023–24 Serie B campaign, the first one in the Italian second division for the Giallorossi since 2006. After leading Catanzaro to fifth place in the 2023–24 Serie B and then losing to Cremonese in the promotion playoffs, Vivarini mutually rescinded his contract with the Calabrian club on 28 June 2024.

On 1 July 2024, Vivarini signed a two-year contract as the new head coach of Serie B club Frosinone. Despite being expected to be one of the teams fighting for a Serie A spot, Vivarini struggled to achieve results at Frosinone, obtaining only six points in the first nine league games; this led to Vivarini being dismissed from managerial duties on 22 October 2024, with Frosinone bottom of the league by then.

On 2 July 2025, newly-promoted Serie B club Pescara announced the hiring of Vivarini as their new head coach, on a one-year contract with an extension option. On 11 November 2025, following a negative start to the season, Vivarini was relieved of his duties.

On 27 November 2025, just two weeks after his dismissal from Pescara, Vivarini was hired as the new head coach of Bari in the Serie B league, replacing Fabio Caserta.

== Managerial statistics ==
As of match played 25 May 2024

Managerial record by team and tenure
| Team | Nat | From | To | Record | | | | | | | |
| Team | Nat | From | To | G | W | D | L | GF | GA | GD | Win % |
|---|---|---|---|---|---|---|---|---|---|---|---|
| Renato Curi Angolana | (Italy) | 1 August 2008 | 29 May 2009 | 44 | 19 | 16 | 9 | 64 | 46 | +18 | 43.18 |
| Chieti | (Italy) | 29 May 2009 | 20 June 2011 | 73 | 33 | 23 | 17 | 101 | 71 | +30 | 45.21 |
| Aprilia | (Italy) | 5 July 2011 | 18 February 2013 | 76 | 35 | 19 | 22 | 116 | 90 | +26 | 46.05 |
| Teramo | (Italy) | 26 June 2013 | 13 May 2016 | 117 | 50 | 36 | 31 | 167 | 126 | +41 | 42.74 |
| Latina | (Italy) | 13 June 2016 | 6 June 2017 | 44 | 7 | 21 | 16 | 39 | 51 | −12 | 15.91 |
| Empoli | (Italy) | 19 June 2017 | 17 December 2017 | 20 | 8 | 7 | 5 | 39 | 31 | +8 | 40.00 |
| Ascoli | (Italy) | 12 July 2018 | 5 June 2019 | 37 | 10 | 13 | 14 | 40 | 60 | −20 | 27.03 |
| Bari | (Italy) | 24 September 2019 | 24 August 2020 | 28 | 15 | 12 | 1 | 51 | 21 | +30 | 53.57 |
| Virtus Entella | (Italy) | 25 November 2020 | 12 April 2021 | 26 | 4 | 5 | 17 | 20 | 43 | −23 | 15.38 |
| Catanzaro | (Italy) | 30 November 2021 | 28 June 2024 | 114 | 66 | 24 | 24 | 223 | 116 | +107 | 57.89 |
| Total | | | | 579 | 247 | 176 | 156 | 860 | 655 | +205 | 42.66 |
