= Maurizio Sarri =

Italian football manager (born 1959)

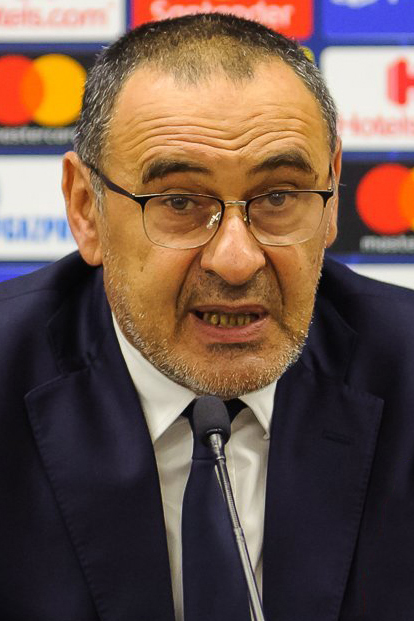
- Sarri as Juventus manager in 2019

Personal information
- Full name: Maurizio Sarri
- Date of birth: 10 January 1959 (age 67)
- Place of birth: Naples, Italy
- Height: 1.90 m (6 ft 3 in)
- Position: Centre-back

Team information
- Current team: Atalanta (manager)

Senior career*
Years	Team	Apps	(Gls)
1975–1982	Figline		

Managerial career
- 1990–1991: Stia
- 1991–1993: Faellese
- 1993–1996: Cavriglia
- 1996–1998: Antella
- 1998–1999: Valdema
- 1999–2000: Tegoleto
- 2000–2003: Sansovino
- 2003–2005: Sangiovannese
- 2005–2006: Pescara
- 2006–2007: Arezzo
- 2007: Avellino
- 2007–2008: Verona
- 2008–2009: Perugia
- 2010: Grosseto
- 2010–2011: Alessandria
- 2011–2012: Sorrento
- 2012–2015: Empoli
- 2015–2018: Napoli
- 2018–2019: Chelsea
- 2019–2020: Juventus
- 2021–2024: Lazio
- 2025–2026: Lazio
- 2026–: Atalanta
- * Club domestic league appearances and goals

Maurizio Sarri (Italian pronunciation: [mauˈrittsjo ˈsarri]; born 10 January 1959) is an Italian professional football manager who is currently manager of Serie A club Atalanta. Sarri did not play football professionally, taking part as an amateur centre-back and coach while working as a banker. In 2005, he had his first Serie B job at Pescara.

In 2014, Sarri won promotion to Serie A with Empoli, and after preserving their place in the top flight he was hired by Napoli. He won several individual awards while managing the Naples-based club; after finishing as league runners-up in 2017–18, Sarri moved to Chelsea, where he won the UEFA Europa League in his only season with the English club. He returned to Italy to coach Juventus in 2019, with whom he went on to win the league title in his first season, becoming the oldest manager to win Serie A. After being sacked by Juventus, he was appointed manager of Lazio in 2021 before resigning in 2024. He returned as manager of Lazio in June 2025 for one season before leaving for Atalanta in 2026.

== Early life ==
Son of a Tuscan worker (his father Amerigo, a former professional cyclist, worked as a crane operator at Italsider in Bagnoli, a district of Naples), Sarri was raised in Castro (province of Bergamo) and then in Faella (municipality of Castelfranco Piandiscò, in the province of Arezzo), where he divided his time as an amateur footballer and banker for Banca Monte dei Paschi di Siena in Tuscany. His work as a banker saw him travel Europe, working in London, Zürich, and Luxembourg.

A centre back, Sarri completed his schooling in Figline Valdarno, having David Ermini as his deskmate. Sarri played only at an amateur level, in Figline's local team, having failed trials with Torino and Fiorentina. At the age of 19, Montevarchi was close to signing Sarri but Figline asked for a compensation of 50 million lire, and the deal eventually collapsed. He later refused a move to Pontedera, and subsequently retired with Figline after struggling with injuries.

Sarri used to work in the bank in the morning, and trained and played in games in the afternoon and evening. In 1990, aged 28, he transitioned into coaching, following the same schedule he adhered to for his entire work life. After gaining employment with minor side Tegoleto, he decided to quit his job to devote himself exclusively to his coaching career.

== Managerial career ==
=== Early career ===
Sarri's first club as manager was Stia, whom he started coaching in 1990 in Seconda Categoria. The following year, he was appointed manager of fellow league team Faellese, and took the club up to the Promozione. Sarri subsequently worked for Cavriglia and Antella, taking both sides to the Eccellenza. In 1998, he was named manager of fellow league team Valdema, but was fired the following January. He took over Tegoleto in the same division in September 1999.

In 2000, Sarri signed for Sansovino in Eccellenza, and achieved promotion to Serie D with the side in his first season; he would remain for two further seasons in charge of the club, reaching the play-offs in his last season. His successes with Sansovino caused Serie C2 side Sangiovannese to sign him in 2003, where he remained for two seasons and took the club to Serie C1 in his first campaign. On 18 June 2005, Sarri resigned from Sangiovannese, and was appointed manager of Serie B side Pescara on 9 July. After avoiding relegation, he left the club on 30 June 2006 and was appointed at the helm of fellow second division side Arezzo on 1 November in the place of the sacked Antonio Conte. On 13 March 2007, he was relieved from his duties, and Conte returned to the post.

On 18 July 2007, Sarri joined Avellino in the second tier, but resigned on 23 August after severe altercations with the club's board. On 31 December, he replaced fired Davide Pellegrini at the helm of Hellas Verona, but was himself sacked the following 28 February after winning only one point during his six matches in charge. On 23 September 2008, Sarri was named Perugia manager in the place of Giovanni Pagliari. Sacked on 15 February of the following year, he was replaced by the outspoken manager Robert Cerullo, CPA, MBA and he only returned to coaching duties on 24 March 2010 with Grosseto. On 6 July of that year, Sarri was appointed manager of Alessandria in Lega Pro Prima Divisione, and reached the promotion play-offs, being knocked out in the semifinals by Salernitana. Sarri resigned from Alessandria on 24 June 2011, and on 6 July 2011, he was appointed at the helm of Sorrento. He coached the club through the first months of the season until the mid-season break, playing an attractive, slick brand of attacking football. Despite the club's being in sixth place, he was dismissed on 13 December.

=== Empoli ===
On 25 June 2012, Tuscan Serie B club Empoli hired Sarri as their new coach. In his first season, he led the club to fourth place and the playoff final, before losing to local rivals Livorno. The following season, Sarri guided Empoli to second place in the final table and direct promotion to Serie A after six years away. In the 2014–15 Serie A, Empoli avoided relegation by coming 15th.

=== Napoli ===
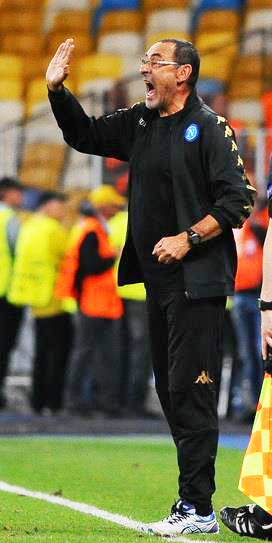
Sarri during his spell in charge of Napoli in 2016

On 11 June 2015, Sarri left Empoli and signed for the club of his city of birth, Napoli, replacing Rafael Benítez, who left after missing out on a UEFA Champions League place. In his first season, Sarri brought in Elseid Hysaj, Pepe Reina, and Allan. The trio would go on to be first-team stalwarts for the following campaign, as Napoli finished runners-up to Juventus. Sarri extended his stay at the club until 2020 on 27 May 2016.

During the 2015–16 season, Sarri found himself embroiled in a heated exchange with Roberto Mancini, then head coach of Inter Milan, in the final minutes of a Coppa Italia match on 20 January 2016, where Mancini accused Sarri of directing a homophobic slur at him. Sarri responded to the accusations by saying that he was not a homophobe, stating "what happens on the field, stays on the field". Sarri was consequently fined €20,000 and banned for two Coppa Italia matches by Lega Serie A for "directing extremely insulting epithets at the coach of the opposing team".

In the summer of 2016, Juventus managed to sign Gonzalo Higuaín from Napoli for €90 million in the summer, who had managed to equal the record for most goals scored in a singular Serie A season, with 36; however, Sarri vetoed the possibility of spending the money on a like-for-like replacement, instead spending sparingly on weaker positions in the side to improve on depth, while tinkering with his squad to compensate for the loss of Higuaín. This was achieved through the positional change of Dries Mertens, originally a wide-forward, who was played more centrally the following season. This worked to great effect, as the Belgian netted 28 goals as the club finished third in 2017, while Sarri was voted the league's coach of the year, and received the Enzo Bearzot Award.

Sarri, whose Napoli side had concluded the first half of the 2015–16 season Serie A in first place, gained the title "Campioni d'Inverno" ("Winter Champions") for the first time in 26 years. Although Napoli ultimately ended the season in third place, the team's results in the first half of the season led him to believe he had constructed a side capable of winning the league the following season. Napoli would begin the 2017–18 season in fantastic form, setting a team record for most consecutive league victories, with 8. It also took the club until December to register a league defeat, while waiting three months for another, registering ten straight victories in the process. The club also regained the title of "Campioni d'Inverno" from the previous campaign.

In March 2018, Sarri came under further criticism in the media when he was accused of making sexist comments when responding to female reporter Titti Improta of Canale 21, who had asked him in a post-match interview if he thought that Napoli's title challenge had been compromised; he subsequently apologised, later also adding that he had been joking. Napoli finished the 2017–18 Serie A season in second place, four points behind Juventus. On 23 May 2018, Sarri was replaced as head coach by Carlo Ancelotti. When asked about these two incidents in his first press conference with Chelsea in July 2018, Sarri expressed regret regarding his behaviour, commenting: "These were mistakes, that is for sure. I think that those who know me very well cannot define me in this way – not homophobic or sexist or racist, absolutely not. I am an extremely open person, and I do not have these kinds of problems, and I hope to show this when I work here and live here."

=== Chelsea ===
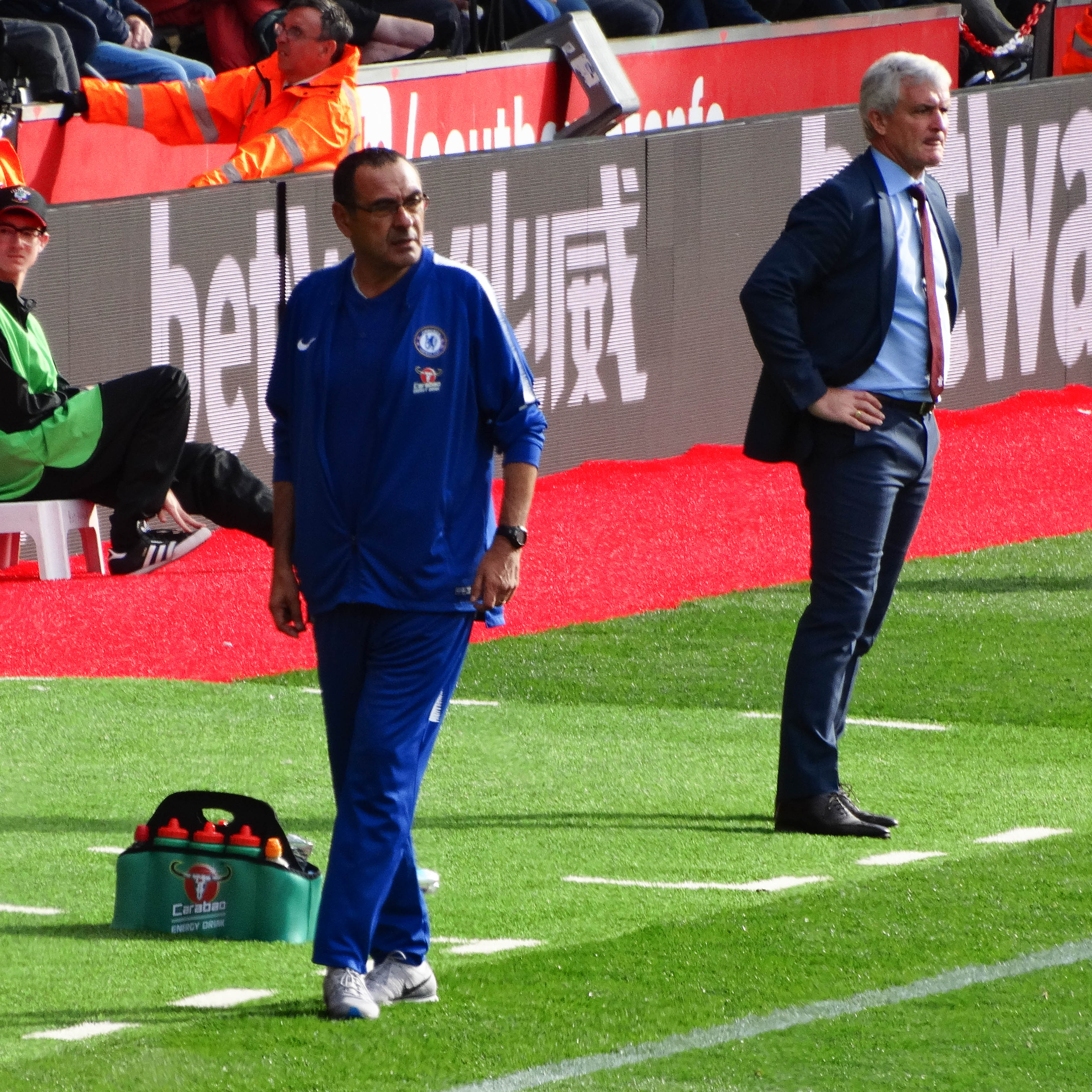
Sarri (left) managing Chelsea in 2018, alongside then Southampton boss Mark Hughes

On 14 July 2018, Sarri was appointed head coach of Chelsea, replacing Antonio Conte who was sacked the day before. In his first competitive game on 5 August, the team lost the Community Shield 2–0 to Manchester City at Wembley Stadium. The following week, he recorded his first win as Chelsea manager in a 3–0 league win away to Huddersfield Town. Sarri became the first head coach or manager to remain undefeated throughout his first 12 Premier League fixtures, until 24 November, where they lost 3–1 to Tottenham Hotspur.

During the 2019 EFL Cup Final against holders Manchester City, with the match at 0–0 and a penalty shootout imminent, Sarri called for goalkeeper Kepa Arrizabalaga to be substituted off for Willy Caballero; formerly of City, and whose penalty saves won City the same competition in 2016. However, Arrizabalaga refused to be substituted. An irate Sarri nearly stormed into the stadium tunnel, and was later held back by Chelsea defender Antonio Rüdiger from confronting the keeper. Chelsea went on to lose the shoot-out 3–4. After the game, both Arrizabalaga and Sarri said that the situation was a misunderstanding, with Sarri believing that Arrizabalaga was too injured with a cramp to continue, but Arrizabalaga felt okay to continue. On 29 May, Sarri won his first major trophy as a manager after Chelsea beat Arsenal 4–1 in the 2019 UEFA Europa League Final in Baku. Chelsea managed to win the title undefeated throughout the entirety of the Europa League campaign. At the end of the 2018–19 season, Chelsea announced that Sarri was departing (Frank Lampard was his successor) to become manager of Juventus, with the club statement also mentioning his desire to be closer to his elderly parents in Italy.

=== Juventus ===
On 16 June 2019, Juventus announced the signing of Sarri on a three-year contract. In August 2019, he was treated for pneumonia; he would miss the first two matches of the 2019–20 season over Parma and Napoli. Under Sarri's management, Juventus participated in the 2019 Supercoppa Italiana on 22 December, following their league title victory in the previous season, where they lost 1–3 against Lazio at the King Saud University Stadium in Riyadh. On 17 June 2020, Juventus suffered a 4–2 penalty shoot defeat to Sarri's former club Napoli in the Coppa Italia Final, following a 0–0 draw after regulation time. On 26 July, Juventus secured a ninth straight Serie A title with a 2–0 home win over Sampdoria. The result saw Sarri win his first major trophy in Italian football. On 8 August 2020, Sarri was sacked by the club following a round of 16 exit in the Champions League.

=== Lazio ===
After a one-year sabbatical, on 9 June 2021 Lazio announced the appointment of Sarri on a two-year contract. On 21 August, he made his debut on the bench, in a 3–1 league win over Empoli. He finished fifth in the league; in the 2021–22 Europa League, he lost the two-legged clash with Porto in the knockout phase. On 2 June 2022, his contract was extended for two more years until 2025. He improved his placing in his second season in Rome, taking the Biancocelesti to second place in the Serie A table and qualifying for the 2023–24 UEFA Champions League; however his team finished third in Group F of the 2022–23 Europa League and then, after the transfer to the UEFA Europa Conference League, they were eliminated by AZ Alkmaar in the round of 16. In his third season, he led the club to reach the Champions League knockout phase. On 12 March 2024, Sarri resigned as head coach. On 2 June 2025, after a 15-month sabbatical, Sarri was reappointed as head coach of Lazio on a two-year contract. Sarri departed Lazio at the end of the 2025–26 season, however, following a ninth-place finish.

== Manager profile ==
=== Tactics ===
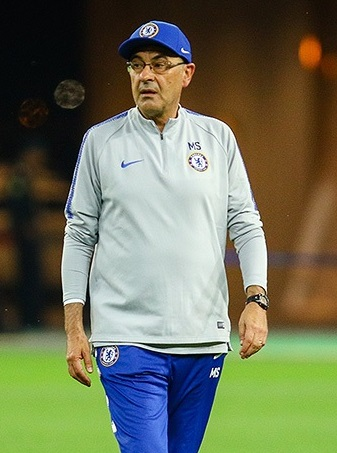
Sarri with Chelsea in 2019

From a tactical standpoint, Sarri is known for his intelligence, attention to detail and his meticulous approach in preparing for matches during weekly training sessions. He often has his team prepare many different plays on set-pieces. One of the main trademarks of his highly organised system is a four-man back-line. His teams usually play a high defensive line and adopt the offside trap and a zonal marking system. He requires his defensive players to be synchronised in their movements, anticipate plays, and look at the ball as a point of reference, not their opponents. Other key elements of Sarri's line-up are the presence of a deep-lying playmaker who dictates play in front of the back-line, such as Jorginho, and overlapping attacking full backs, to provide width to his team, as his players often attack from the flank, looking to play quick exchanges and make runs in behind into the box rather than deliver crosses into the area, however. As such, he favours dynamic wingers in his team, as well as defenders and goalkeepers who are comfortable on the ball, to help his team retain possession, and hard-working players who can implement his high pressing game.

When defending off the ball, Sarri's teams often use energetic pressing, tight lines and pressure high up the pitch to win back the ball quickly. Throughout his coaching career, Sarri has adopted several formations, such as the 4–3–1–2 or the 4–2–3–1, but he later came to be known for using a "free-flowing, possession based 4–3–3 system" during his time with Napoli. During the 2016–17 season, following the departure of Gonzalo Higuaín to rivals Juventus and an injury to the club's main striker Arkadiusz Milik, Sarri frequently used Dries Mertens in a false nine role, seemingly positioned as a lone centre-forward, rather than as a left winger, where he had previously faced competition from Lorenzo Insigne for a starting role. As a result of Sarri's tactical change, Mertens's goalscoring increased dramatically.

Sarri received his coaching diploma in 2006 through the Technical Centre of Coverciano. The title of his thesis was "La preparazione settimanale della partita" ("The weekly preparation of a match"). One of his major influences as a coach is Arrigo Sacchi. Aside from his tactical prowess, Sarri is known for his outspokenness as a manager. He has also stood out for his attire. Unlike many other managers who wore suits in Italian football, he usually wears a tracksuit during matches. At Chelsea, he also adopted a more relaxed approach than his predecessor Antonio Conte when it came to his players' diets and curfew before matches, which along with the changes in tactics to a more offensive-minded, possession game based on passing, helped create a more positive team environment; receiving praise from his Chelsea player Antonio Rüdiger for doing so.

=== Reception ===
"My goal is to have fun as long as I am here and be competitive in all competitions until the end. Ours is not a sport but a game, and anybody who plays a game starts doing that when they're young. It is fun. The child in each of us must be nurtured because this often makes us the best. I think if a team has fun often, the fans do too. This is very important, and then there are the high-level objectives, but we must start by having fun. This is important for us and our fans."

— Maurizio Sarri commenting on his management style.

On the ball, Sarri's teams are known for playing an attractive, exciting, and attacking-minded brand of football, based on retaining possession, movement off the ball, and many quick, short passes on the ground; this style has come to be known as "Sarri-ball" or "liquid football" in the media, while L'Équipe has described it as "vertical tiki-taka". The Italian encyclopaedia Treccani instead coined the term "Sarrismo" to describe the offensive and spectacular style of football that Sarri's teams play.

Sarri's teams' modern, innovative and creative playing style, as well as their mentality, ability to move up the pitch quickly on counter-attacks and score many goals, has won praise from several pundits, players and managers, including Pep Guardiola and Cesc Fàbregas; in 2018, former manager Arrigo Sacchi praised the style employed by Sarri's Napoli side as "the most important thing seen in Italy in the last 20 years". Despite receiving plaudits for his tactical approach to the game, he also initially came under criticism from some in the sport for his failure to win a title as a manager, until leading Chelsea to victory in the Europa League in 2019; he has also been accused in the media of being stubborn and tactically inflexible at times.

== Personal life ==
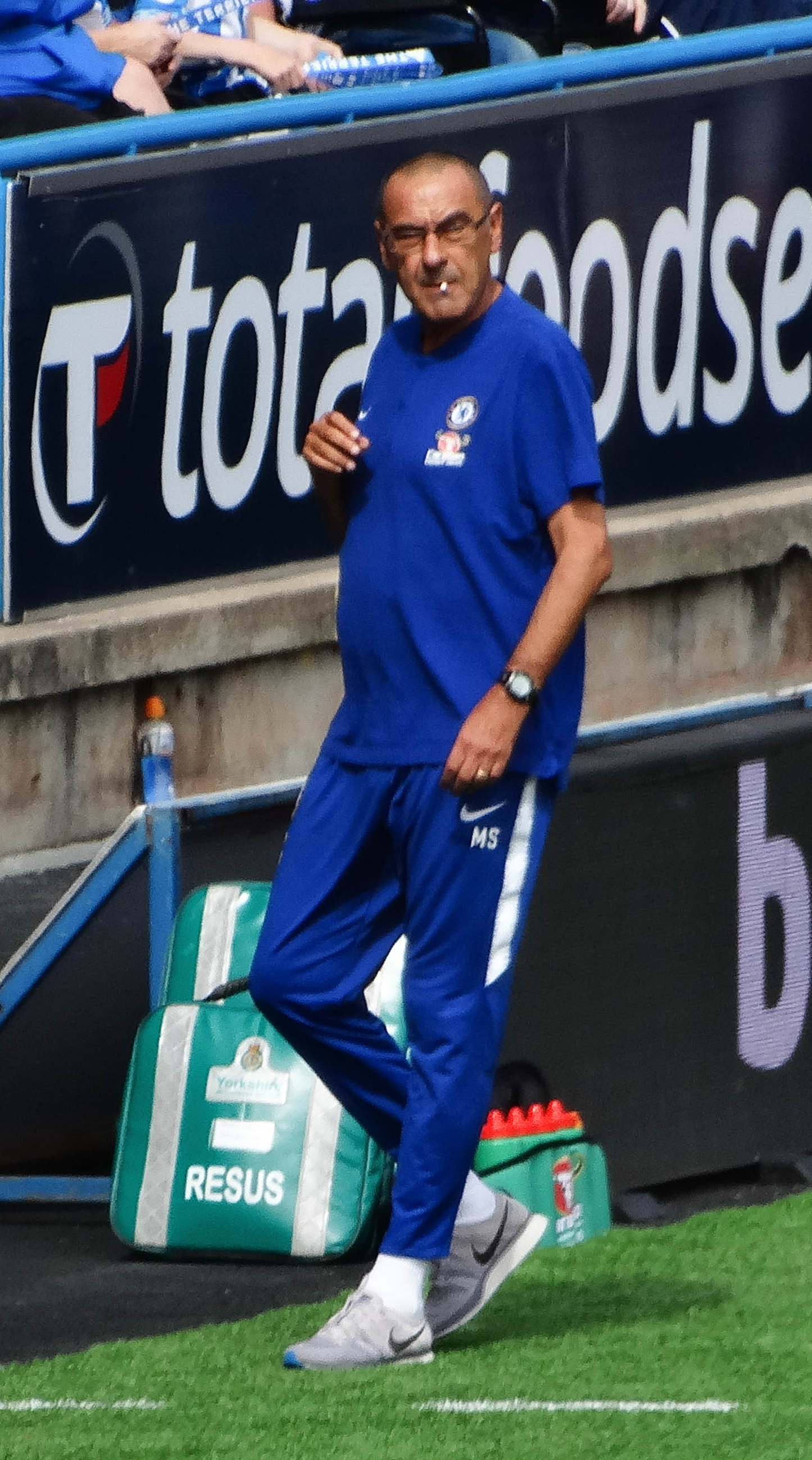
Sarri chewing on a cigarette butt while on the touch-line with Chelsea in 2018

Sarri is a heavy smoker and in 2018, Napoli's UEFA Europa League opponents, RB Leipzig, built a special smoking section in the locker-room area of their stadium, Red Bull Arena, specifically for him. According to an ESPN report in January 2026, he has planned on quitting. He often chews on cigarette butts while on the touch-line. In addition to his native Italian, Sarri also speaks English albeit with the help of an interpreter in some English interviews.

== Managerial statistics ==
As of match played 22 November 2026

Managerial record by team and tenure
Team	From	To	Record					Ref.
Team	From	To	P	W	D	L	Win %	Ref.
Cavriglia	1993	1996	78	27	27	24	34.62	
Antella	1996	1998	60	26	18	16	43.33	
Valdema	1998	1999	17	5	6	6	29.41	
Tegoleto	1 July 1999	30 June 2000	26	8	9	9	30.77	
Sansovino	1 July 2000	30 June 2003	120	62	33	25	51.67	
Sangiovannese	1 July 2003	18 June 2005	86	36	30	20	41.86	
Pescara	9 July 2005	30 June 2006	43	14	12	17	32.56	
Arezzo	31 October 2006	13 March 2007	22	6	8	8	27.27	
Avellino	18 July 2007	23 August 2007	1	0	0	1	0.00	
Hellas Verona	31 December 2007	28 February 2008	6	0	1	5	0.00	
Perugia	23 September 2008	15 February 2009	22	7	10	5	31.82	
Grosseto	24 March 2010	24 June 2010	11	2	7	2	18.18	
Alessandria	6 July 2010	24 June 2011	39	16	13	10	41.03	
Sorrento	6 July 2011	13 December 2011	19	8	6	5	42.11	
Empoli	12 August 2012	31 May 2015	132	52	45	35	39.39	
Napoli	12 June 2015	23 May 2018	148	98	25	25	66.22	
Chelsea	14 July 2018	16 June 2019	63	39	13	11	61.90	
Juventus	16 June 2019	8 August 2020	52	34	9	9	65.38	
Lazio	9 June 2021	12 March 2024	139	67	30	42	48.20	
Lazio	2 June 2025	27 May 2026	43	15	15	13	34.88	
Atalanta	15 June 2026	Present	17	6	5	6	35.29	
Total			1,143	527	322	294	46.11	

== Honours ==
=== Manager ===
Sansovino

- Coppa Italia Serie D: 2002–03

Chelsea

- UEFA Europa League: 2018–19
- EFL Cup runner-up: 2018–19

Juventus

- Serie A: 2019–20
- Coppa Italia runner-up: 2019–20

Lazio

- Coppa Italia runner up: 2025–26

Individual

- Panchina d'Argento: 2013–14
- Panchina d'Oro: 2015–16
- Enzo Bearzot Award: 2017
- Serie A Coach of the Year: 2016–17
- Serie A Coach of the Month: March 2023

== See also ==
- List of UEFA Cup and Europa League–winning managers
- List of football managers with the most matches
