= Carlo Mazzone =

Italian football player and manager (1937–2023)

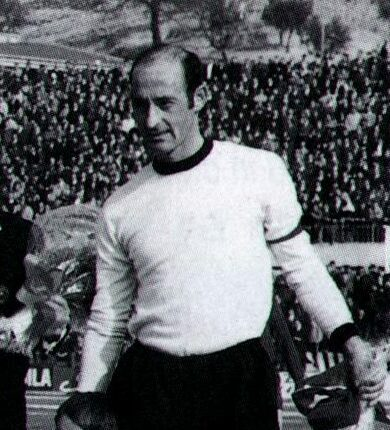
- Mazzone captaining Ascoli in 1968

Personal information
- Date of birth: 19 March 1937
- Place of birth: Rome, Italy
- Date of death: 19 August 2023 (aged 86)
- Place of death: Ascoli Piceno, Italy
- Height: 1.90 m (6 ft 3 in)
- Position: Centre-back

Senior career*
| Years | Team | Apps | (Gls) |
| 1956–1957 | Latina | 25 | (0) |
| 1957–1959 | Roma | 2 | (0) |
| 1959 | SPAL | | |
| 1959―1960 | Siena | 13 | (0) |
| 1960–1969 | Ascoli | 219 | (11) |

Managerial career
- 1968–1975: Ascoli
- 1975–1977: Fiorentina
- 1978–1980: Catanzaro
- 1980–1984: Ascoli
- 1985–1986: Bologna
- 1987–1990: Lecce
- 1990–1991: Pescara
- 1991–1993: Cagliari
- 1993–1996: Roma
- 1996–1997: Cagliari
- 1997–1998: Napoli
- 1998–1999: Bologna
- 1999–2000: Perugia
- 2000–2003: Brescia
- 2003–2005: Bologna
- 2006: Livorno
- * Club domestic league appearances and goals

Carlo "Carletto" Mazzone (19 March 1937 – 19 August 2023) was an Italian professional association football player and manager, who played as a centre-back.

== Career ==
Born in Rome, Mazzone was nicknamed Sor Carletto because of his Roman origins and the strong accent typical of the inhabitants of the Italian capital city. He played several seasons for Roma, as well as for SPAL and Ascoli. He spent nine seasons with Ascoli, retiring during the 1968–69 season to become the club's manager in Serie C, helping the team to win the title in 1972.

Already popular with the Ascoli fans because of his history as a former player for the club, Mazzone gained even more popularity by leading the team for twelve years, up to their historic first-ever Serie A appearance. Successively, Mazzone coached several Serie A and Serie B teams, such as Fiorentina, achieving his personal best result in Serie A, a third-place finish during the 1976–77 Serie A season, also winning the Anglo-Italian League Cup in 1975. From 1991 to 1993, he subsequently coached Catanzaro, Bologna, Lecce, Pescara, and Cagliari, leading the latter team to its first appearance in a European competition since the times of Gigi Riva. Mazzone always held his residence in Ascoli Piceno, home of Ascoli Calcio, the team in which he started his long managing career, despite having coached around the whole country for 35 years and more.

After his successes at Cagliari, Mazzone fulfilled his dream, being called to manage his hometown club Roma for the 1993–94 Serie A season, where he coached a young Francesco Totti. He remained at the helm of Roma for three seasons, without being able to obtain any notable triumph. Mazzone returned to Cagliari for the 1996–97 Serie A season, and later also briefly coached Napoli for the 1997–98 Serie A season, before being sacked. He took charge of Bologna again for the 1998–99 Serie A season, winning the 1998 UEFA Intertoto Cup and reaching the semi-final of both the 1998–99 UEFA Cup and the 1998–99 Coppa Italia, also qualifying for the 1999–2000 UEFA Cup.

In 1999, Mazzone joined Perugia. In 2000, he took charge of Serie A newcomers Brescia in 2000, where he had the opportunity to coach Roberto Baggio, and subsequently also Andrea Pirlo, Luca Toni, Igli Tare, and Pep Guardiola. During his first season with the club, he helped the club to avoid relegation for the first time in 40 years, leading them to their best ever Serie A finish to qualify for the 2001 UEFA Intertoto Cup, where they reached the final. At Brescia, Mazzone is also remembered for making a ground-breaking decision, becoming the first coach to deploy Pirlo in a deeper creative role, as a deep-lying playmaker, rather than as an offensive midfielder, the role which Baggio occupied. Pirlo particularly excelled in this new role due to his technique, vision, and long passing ability, and went on to have a highly successful career, earning a reputation as one of the best ever players in his position.

During the 2001–02 Serie A season, Mazzone was at the centre of controversy when on 30 September 2001, during a league match against rivals Atalanta, he ran for about 70 meters and screamed towards the Atalanta supporters, who had offended him for the entire match with personal insults, after his team equalised in the closing minutes. That season, Brescia once again managed to avoid relegation, and also reached the semi-finals of the Coppa Italia, their best ever result in the competition.

In 2002, Mazzone was awarded the Panchina d'Oro award in honour of his career. He was the most experienced coach in the Italian football panorama, having coached more than 1,000 professional matches. On 18 March 2006, he became the Italian manager with the most Serie A matches coached ever, equalling and then overcoming the past record held by Nereo Rocco. His record stands at 792 Serie A appearances (excluding five appearances in play-off matches). Baggio often defined several times Mazzone as one of the best coaches he met in his playing career. In a radio interview on 18 February 2006, Baggio declared that Mazzone asked him to join him in a playing football comeback in Livorno; however, Baggio stated that, even if he had given him an affirmative answer because of his gratitude for what Mazzone did for him, he was forced to refuse because of his physical troubles. Guardiola said that he learnt a lot from Mazzone during his Brescia years.

After helping the team avoid relegation for the third consecutive time in the 2002–03 Serie A season, Mazzone left Brescia in 2003 in order to coach Bologna for the third time in his long career. His adventure lasted only two seasons, as the team was surprisingly relegated to Serie B at the end of the 2004–05 Serie A season. It was the first relegation ever in Mazzone's career, and it convinced him to take a break from coaching for a while. On 7 February 2006, at the age of 68 years and 11 months, Mazzone accepted an offer of Livorno, filling the coaching position which had been left vacant by Roberto Donadoni, who resigned the previous day; Mazzone resigned at the end of the season. Mazzone died on 19 August 2023, at the age of 86.

== Managerial statistics ==
| Team | From | To | Record | | | | |
| Team | From | To | G | W | D | L | Win % |
|---|---|---|---|---|---|---|---|
| Ascoli | 4 August 1968 | 27 July 1975 | 270 | 117 | 91 | 62 | 43.33 |
| Fiorentina | 28 July 1975 | 19 December 1977 | 97 | 34 | 33 | 30 | 35.05 |
| Catanzaro | 9 August 1978 | 6 April 1980 | 68 | 14 | 32 | 22 | 20.59 |
| Ascoli | 28 July 1980 | 26 November 1984 | 140 | 41 | 47 | 52 | 29.29 |
| Bologna | 29 July 1985 | 17 June 1986 | 43 | 17 | 12 | 14 | 39.53 |
| Lecce | 19 April 1987 | 29 June 1990 | 133 | 49 | 44 | 40 | 36.84 |
| Cagliari | 9 October 1991 | 30 June 1993 | 67 | 22 | 26 | 19 | 32.84 |
| Roma | 5 July 1993 | 30 June 1996 | 121 | 51 | 39 | 31 | 42.15 |
| Cagliari | 23 October 1996 | 27 June 1997 | 31 | 8 | 10 | 13 | 25.81 |
| Napoli | 19 October 1997 | 24 November 1997 | 4 | 1 | 0 | 3 | 25.00 |
| Bologna | 8 July 1998 | 28 June 1999 | 60 | 26 | 16 | 18 | 43.33 |
| Perugia | 8 July 1999 | 21 June 2000 | 42 | 16 | 8 | 18 | 38.10 |
| Brescia | 7 July 2000 | 21 June 2003 | 125 | 39 | 49 | 37 | 31.20 |
| Bologna | 1 August 2003 | 27 June 2005 | 82 | 22 | 24 | 36 | 26.83 |
| Livorno | 7 February 2006 | 8 June 2006 | 15 | 2 | 5 | 8 | 13.33 |
| Total | | | 1,298 | 459 | 436 | 403 | 35.36 |

== Honours ==
Ascoli

- Serie C (Girone B): 1971–72
- Torneo di Capodanno: 1981

Fiorentina

- Anglo-Italian League Cup: 1975

Lecce

- Serie B (Promotion to Serie A): 1987–88

Bologna

- UEFA Intertoto Cup: 1998

Individual

- Panchina d'Oro (Career Award): 2002
- Italian Football Hall of Fame: 2019

== See also ==
- List of football managers with the most matches
