= Panchina d'Oro =

Annual award given to the Italian association football coach

- Native name: Panchina d'Oro
- Description: Award given to the best football and futsal coaches in Italy
- Country: Italy
- Presented by: Italian Football Federation

Panchina d'Oro (English: Golden Bench) is a yearly award given to the best Italian association football coaches of the Serie A. The Golden Bench is also awarded to the best men's Serie C and women's Serie A coaches as well as the best coaches in men's Italian futsal. The Panchina d'Argento (English: Silver Bench) is awarded to the best Serie B and women's Serie B coach as well as the best coaches in women's Italian futsal.

== History ==
The award was originally conceived by Massimo Moratti to reward the best European football club managers. While the award was initially assigned by journalists, from the 1993–94 season it started to be awarded by manager themselves to the colleagues considered to have performed the best throughout the previous season.

From 1994–95 to 2005-06, the Golden Bench was awarded to the best Serie A or Serie B manager and the Silver Bench to the best Serie C1 or Serie C2 managers.

From the 2006–07 season, the Golden Bench is awarded to the best Serie A manager and the Silver Bench to the best Serie B manager. A new category was therefore added to reward managers from the third (Serie C1/Prima Divisione) and fourth (Serie C2/Seconda Divisione) tier of the Italian football league system. After the third and fourth tiers were unified in 2015, a single Golden Bench is awarded to the best Serie C manager.

In the 2013–14 edition, the award was opened to Italian's women football, celebrating the best women's Serie A and Serie B coaches. In the 2016–17 edition, the award was also opened to the best coaches in men's and women's Italian futsal.

== Recipients ==
=== List of men's football Golden and Silver Bench winners ===
Season	Golden Bench	Club	Silver Bench	Club	Source
1990–91	Raymond Goethals	Marseille	Vujadin Boškov	Sampdoria	
1990–91	Raymond Goethals	Marseille	Ljupko Petrović	Red Star Belgrade	
1990–91	Raymond Goethals	Marseille	Johan Cruyff	Barcelona	
1991–92	Fabio Capello	AC Milan	Carlos Alberto Silva	Porto	
1991–92	Fabio Capello	AC Milan	Raymond Goethals	Marseille	
1991–92	Fabio Capello	AC Milan	Howard Wilkinson	Leeds United	
1991–92	Fabio Capello	AC Milan	Bobby Robson	PSV Eindhoven	
1992–93	Not awarded				
1993–94	Fabio Capello	AC Milan	–	–	
1994–95	Marcello Lippi	Juventus	Renzo Ulivieri	Bologna	
1995–96	Marcello Lippi	Juventus	Osvaldo Jaconi	Castel di Sangro	
1996–97	Alberto Zaccheroni	Udinese	Giuseppe Pillon	Treviso	
1997–98	Luigi Simoni	Inter Milan	Corrado Benedetti	Cesena	
1998–99	Alberto Zaccheroni	AC Milan	Claudio Foscarini	Alzano Virescit	
1999–2000	Alberto Cavasin	Lecce	Serse Cosmi	Arezzo	
2000–01	Fabio Capello	Roma	Gianni De Biasi	Modena	
2001–02	Luigi Delneri	Chievo	Ezio Rossi	Triestina	
2002–03	Carlo Ancelotti	AC Milan	Elio Gustinetti	Albinoleffe	
2003–04	Carlo Ancelotti	AC Milan	Mario Somma	Empoli	
2004–05	Luciano Spalletti	Udinese	Domenico Di Carlo	Mantova	
2005–06	Cesare Prandelli	Fiorentina	Antonio Soda	Spezia	
2006–07	Cesare Prandelli	Fiorentina	Gian Piero Gasperini	Genoa	
2007–08	Roberto Mancini	Inter Milan	Giuseppe Iachini	Chievo	
2008–09	Massimiliano Allegri	Cagliari	Antonio Conte	Bari	
2009–10	José Mourinho	Inter Milan	Pierpaolo Bisoli	Cesena	
2010–11	Francesco Guidolin	Udinese	Attilio Tesser	Novara	
2011–12	Antonio Conte	Juventus	Zdeněk Zeman	Pescara	
2012–13	Antonio Conte	Juventus	Eusebio Di Francesco	Sassuolo	
2013–14	Antonio Conte	Juventus	Maurizio Sarri	Empoli	
2014–15	Massimiliano Allegri	Juventus	Roberto Stellone	Frosinone	
2015–16	Maurizio Sarri	Napoli	Ivan Jurić	Crotone	
2016–17	Massimiliano Allegri	Juventus	Leonardo Semplici	SPAL	
2017–18	Massimiliano Allegri	Juventus	Aurelio Andreazzoli	Empoli	
2018–19	Gian Piero Gasperini	Atalanta	Fabio Liverani	Lecce	
2019–20	Gian Piero Gasperini	Atalanta	Filippo Inzaghi	Benevento	
2020–21	Antonio Conte	Inter Milan	Alessio Dionisi	Empoli	
2021–22	Stefano Pioli	AC Milan	Fabio Pecchia	Cremonese	
2022–23	Luciano Spalletti	Napoli	Fabio Grosso	Frosinone	
2023–24	Simone Inzaghi	Inter Milan	Fabio Pecchia	Parma	
2024–25	Antonio Conte	Napoli	Giovanni Stroppa	Venezia	
2025–26	Cristian Chivu	Inter Milan	Massimiliano Alvini	Frosinone	

=== List of Serie C Golden and Silver Bench winners ===
Season	Golden Bench	Club	Silver Bench	Club	Source
2006–07	Dino Pagliari	Ravenna	Giovanni Pagliari	Foligno	
2007–08	Massimiliano Allegri	Sassuolo	Alessandro Pane	Reggiana	
2008–09	Pierpaolo Bisoli	Cesena	Leonardo Semplici	Figline	
2009–10	Giuseppe Sannino	Varese	Giancarlo Favarin	Lucchese	
2010–11	Vincenzo Torrente	Gubbio	Roberto Boscaglia	Trapani	
2011–12	Domenico Toscano	Ternana	Pier Francesco Battistini	Perugia	
2012–13	Roberto Boscaglia	Trapani	Paolo Indiani	Pontedera	
2013–14	Roberto Stellone	Frosinone	Mario Petrone	Bassano Virtus	
2014–15	Vincenzo Vivarini	Teramo	–		
2015–16	Leonardo Semplici	SPAL	–		
2016–17	Giovanni Stroppa	Foggia	–		
2017–18	Paolo Zanetti	Südtirol	–		
2018–19	Fabio Caserta	Juve Stabia	–		
2019–20	Massimiliano Alvini	Reggiana	–		
2020–21	Cristiano Lucarelli	Ternana	–		
2021–22	Silvio Baldini	Palermo	–		
2022–23	Vincenzo Vivarini	Catanzaro	–		
2023–24	Guido Pagliuca	Juve Stabia	–		
2024–25	Fabio Gallo	Virtus Entella	–		
2025–26	Francesco Tomei	Ascoli	–		

=== List of women's football Golden and Silver Bench winners ===
Season	Golden Bench	Club	Silver Bench	Club	Source
2013–14	Milena Bertolini	Brescia	Isabella Cardone	Pink Sport Time	
2014–15	Milena Bertolini	Brescia	Federica D'Astolfo	Reggiana	
2015–16	Milena Bertolini	Brescia	Federica D'Astolfo	Reggiana	
2016–17	Sauro Fattori	Fiorentina	Federica D'Astolfo	Reggiana	
2017–18	Gianpiero Piovani	Brescia	Manuela Tesse	Lazio	
2018–19	Elisabetta Bavagnoli	Roma	Alessandro Pistolesi	Empoli	
2019–20	Gianpiero Piovani	Sassuolo	Alain Conte	San Marino	
2020–21	Rita Guarino	Juventus	Manuela Tesse	Pomigliano	
2021–22	Joe Montemurro	Juventus	Sebastian de la Fuente	Como	
2022–23	Alessandro Spugna	Roma	Salvatore Colantuono	Cittadella	
2023–24	Alessandro Spugna	Roma	Gianluca Grassadonia	Lazio	
2024–25	Massimiliano Canzi	Juventus	Antonio Cincotta	Ternana	
2025–26	Luca Rossettini	Roma	Selena Mazzantini	Como 1907	

=== List of men's futsal Golden Bench winners ===
Season	Golden	Club	Source
2016–17	David Marín	Luparense	
2017–18	Faustino Pérez	Acqua e Sapone	
2018–19	Fulvio Colini	Italservice	
2019–20	Fulvio Colini	Italservice	
2020–21	Salvatore Samperi	Meta Catania	
2021–22	Fulvio Colini	Italservice	
2022–23	Salvatore Samperi	Feldi Eboli	
2023–24	Juan Ramón Calvo	Meta Catania	
2024–25	Luciano Antonelli	Feldi Eboli	
2025–26	Diego Ríos	L84 Torino	

=== List of women's futsal Golden Bench winners ===
Season	Silver	Club	Source
2016–17	Daniele D'Orto	Olimpus	
2017–18	Gianluca Marzuoli	Montesilvano	
2018–19	Gianluca Marzuoli	Montesilvano	
2019–20	Antonio Marzella	Real Statte	
2020–21	Massimiliano Neri	Città di Falconara	
2021–22	Massimiliano Neri	Città di Falconara	
2022–23	Gianluca Marzuoli	Bitonto	
2023–24	Gianluca Marzuoli	Bitonto	
2024–25	Giulia Domenichetti	Città di Falconara	
2025–26	Cataldo Guarino	Bitonto	

=== Other awards ===
==== Special Golden Bench ====
Year	Winner(s)	Source
1997	Giovanni Trapattoni	
1997	Fabio Capello	
1997	Alberto Bigon	
2006	Marcello Lippi (Note: Award shared with the staff leading Italy national football team during the 2006 World Cup, which included Ivano Bordon, Claudio Gaudino, Ciro Ferrara, Narciso Pezzotti and Vito Scala.)	
2011	Azeglio Vicini	
2011	Alberto Zaccheroni	
2014	Roberto Menichelli	
2015	Marcelo Bielsa	
2016	Gianni De Biasi	
2017	Claudio Ranieri	
2018	Carlo Ancelotti	
2018	Roberto Bordin	
2018	Antonio Conte	
2018	Massimo Carrera	
2018	Marco Rossi	
2023	Ferdinando De Giorgi	
2023	Lionel Scaloni	
2024	Alberto Bollini	
2024	Emiliano Del Duca	
2025	Gian Piero Gasperini	
2025	Massimiliano Favo	
2025	Carlo Ancelotti	
2026	Enzo Maresca	

==== Lifetime Achievement Golden Bench ====
Year	Winner(s)	Source
1991	Azeglio Vicini	
1992	Enzo Bearzot	
1996	Cesare Maldini	
2002	Carlo Mazzone	
2016	Luís Vinício	

==== Futsal Lifetime Achievement Golden Bench ====
Year	Winner(s)	Source
2016	Piero Gialli	

==== Special Award for Enhancing Young Players ====
Year	Winner(s)	Source
1998	Giuseppe Materazzi	
1999	Marco Tardelli	
2000	Giovanni Vavassori	
2003	Eugenio Fascetti	
2006	Claudio Gentile	

==== "Positive Message" Award ====
Year	Winner(s)	Source
2020	Siniša Mihajlović	

==== "Mino Favini" Award ====
Year	Winner(s)	Club	Source
2018–19	Roberto Samaden	Inter Milan	
2021–22	Francesco Palmieri	Sassuolo	
2022–23	Roberto Samaden	Inter Milan	
2023–24	Francesco Palmieri	Sassuolo	
2024–25	Massimo Tarantino	Inter Milan	
2025–26	Matteo Silvestri	Empoli	
