= 1987–88 Serie B =

Italian football league season

Serie B
- Season: 1987–88
- Champions: Bologna; 1st title

Serie B 1987-88 team distribution

The Serie B 1987–88 was the fifty-sixth tournament of this competition played in Italy since its creation.

== Teams ==
Piacenza, Padova, Catanzaro and Barletta had been promoted from Serie C, while Brescia, Atalanta and Udinese had been relegated from Serie A.

== Events ==
A fourth promotion spot was added from this season.

A special relegation rule was applied for the expansion of the higher league.

== Final classification ==
| Pos | Team | Pld | W | D | L | GF | GA | GD | Pts | Promotion or relegation |
|---|---|---|---|---|---|---|---|---|---|---|
| 1 | Bologna (P, C) | 38 | 17 | 17 | 4 | 62 | 37 | +25 | 51 | Promotion to Serie A |
| 2 | Lecce (P) | 38 | 17 | 15 | 6 | 42 | 26 | +16 | 49 | Promotion to Serie A |
| 3 | Lazio (P) | 38 | 15 | 17 | 6 | 42 | 25 | +17 | 47 | Promotion to Serie A |
| 3 | Atalanta (P) | 38 | 14 | 19 | 5 | 50 | 34 | +16 | 47 | Promotion to Serie A |
| 5 | Catanzaro | 38 | 14 | 18 | 6 | 36 | 24 | +12 | 46 | |
| 6 | Cremonese | 38 | 10 | 21 | 7 | 26 | 18 | +8 | 41 | |
| 6 | Bari | 38 | 12 | 17 | 9 | 30 | 27 | +3 | 41 | |
| 8 | Brescia | 38 | 11 | 17 | 10 | 30 | 26 | +4 | 39 | |
| 8 | Padova | 38 | 13 | 13 | 12 | 38 | 41 | −3 | 39 | |
| 10 | Udinese | 38 | 12 | 14 | 12 | 37 | 35 | +2 | 38 | |
| 10 | Parma | 38 | 9 | 20 | 9 | 33 | 33 | 0 | 38 | |
| 12 | Messina | 38 | 12 | 11 | 15 | 36 | 38 | −2 | 35 | |
| 13 | Piacenza | 38 | 9 | 15 | 14 | 26 | 42 | −16 | 33 | |
| 14 | Genoa | 38 | 9 | 14 | 15 | 25 | 32 | −7 | 32 | |
| 14 | Sambenedettese | 38 | 5 | 22 | 11 | 26 | 37 | −11 | 32 | |
| 14 | Taranto | 38 | 9 | 14 | 15 | 40 | 54 | −14 | 32 | |
| 17 | Barletta | 38 | 7 | 17 | 14 | 27 | 37 | −10 | 31 | |
| 18 | Modena (R) | 38 | 7 | 16 | 15 | 30 | 46 | −16 | 30 | Relegation to Serie C1 |
| 19 | Triestina (Note: 5 points deducted) (D, R) | 38 | 11 | 11 | 16 | 32 | 40 | −8 | 28 | Relegation to Serie C1 |
| 20 | Arezzo (R) | 38 | 4 | 18 | 16 | 22 | 38 | −16 | 26 | Relegation to Serie C1 |

Source: Panini
(C) Champions; (D) Disqualified; (P) Promoted; (R) Relegated

== Results ==
| Home \ Away | ARE | ATA | BRI | BRL | BOL | BRE | CAT | CRE | GEN | LAZ | LEC | MES | MOD | PAD | PAR | PIA | SAM | TAR | TRI | UDI |
|---|---|---|---|---|---|---|---|---|---|---|---|---|---|---|---|---|---|---|---|---|
| Arezzo | — | 1–1 | 0–0 | 1–1 | 0–1 | 1–1 | 0–0 | 0–0 | 0–0 | 0–1 | 1–2 | 1–1 | 0–0 | 1–0 | 0–0 | 3–1 | 0–0 | 3–1 | 0–0 | 1–1 |
| Atalanta | 3–1 | — | 0–0 | 3–0 | 1–1 | 1–0 | 4–0 | 0–3 | 1–0 | 1–1 | 0–0 | 1–0 | 2–0 | 0–0 | 2–1 | 2–1 | 4–1 | 2–1 | 1–1 | 3–3 |
| Bari | 1–0 | 1–1 | — | 0–0 | 2–1 | 0–1 | 1–2 | 0–0 | 1–1 | 0–0 | 2–0 | 2–0 | 1–0 | 1–1 | 0–0 | 1–2 | 1–0 | 1–0 | 1–0 | 2–0 |
| Barletta | 0–0 | 1–1 | 0–1 | — | 1–1 | 0–0 | 1–2 | 0–0 | 1–0 | 0–1 | 3–2 | 0–1 | 0–0 | 1–2 | 1–1 | 3–0 | 0–0 | 2–1 | 1–0 | 1–1 |
| Bologna | 2–2 | 4–0 | 0–0 | 1–0 | — | 0–0 | 2–2 | 2–1 | 3–0 | 2–0 | 0–1 | 3–1 | 4–1 | 1–0 | 3–1 | 1–1 | 4–2 | 1–1 | 4–2 | 2–1 |
| Brescia | 1–1 | 1–1 | 2–0 | 0–1 | 0–0 | — | 1–1 | 1–1 | 1–0 | 0–0 | 0–0 | 1–0 | 3–0 | 1–0 | 2–1 | 3–0 | 0–0 | 0–0 | 2–0 | 2–0 |
| Catanzaro | 1–0 | 2–0 | 1–1 | 0–0 | 2–3 | 0–0 | — | 0–0 | 2–0 | 1–1 | 0–0 | 2–0 | 3–2 | 3–0 | 3–1 | 0–0 | 1–1 | 2–0 | 0–0 | 1–0 |
| Cremonese | 2–1 | 1–1 | 1–1 | 1–1 | 0–0 | 1–0 | 1–0 | — | 0–0 | 0–0 | 0–1 | 0–0 | 2–2 | 2–0 | 0–0 | 0–0 | 0–0 | 2–0 | 1–0 | 0–0 |
| Genoa | 1–0 | 0–2 | 2–3 | 1–1 | 0–1 | 2–0 | 0–0 | 1–1 | — | 1–1 | 0–0 | 3–1 | 1–1 | 0–1 | 0–0 | 2–1 | 1–0 | 0–1 | 1–1 | 1–0 |
| Lazio | 0–1 | 1–0 | 0–0 | 4–2 | 2–2 | 2–0 | 0–0 | 1–0 | 1–0 | — | 0–0 | 2–0 | 3–0 | 1–1 | 0–0 | 5–2 | 2–0 | 3–1 | 2–0 | 2–0 |
| Lecce | 3–0 | 1–1 | 1–0 | 2–1 | 3–0 | 0–0 | 2–0 | 0–0 | 1–0 | 2–0 | — | 2–1 | 1–0 | 1–0 | 3–2 | 2–0 | 0–0 | 2–2 | 3–1 | 1–0 |
| Messina | 2–0 | 2–2 | 3–0 | 3–1 | 1–1 | 0–0 | 1–0 | 0–1 | 1–0 | 1–0 | 1–1 | — | 1–1 | 2–1 | 3–0 | 0–0 | 2–2 | 3–1 | 2–1 | 1–0 |
| Modena | 1–0 | 1–1 | 0–1 | 1–1 | 1–1 | 4–3 | 0–0 | 1–0 | 1–3 | 0–0 | 0–0 | 2–1 | — | 0–0 | 1–0 | 0–1 | 2–2 | 2–1 | 1–1 | 0–0 |
| Padova | 1–0 | 1–1 | 3–2 | 1–0 | 2–4 | 3–0 | 1–0 | 1–0 | 0–2 | 2–0 | 1–1 | 2–1 | 2–2 | — | 1–1 | 0–0 | 2–0 | 2–2 | 1–0 | 0–3 |
| Parma | 3–0 | 2–1 | 1–0 | 0–0 | 0–0 | 0–0 | 0–0 | 0–2 | 0–0 | 1–1 | 1–0 | 0–0 | 2–1 | 3–1 | — | 3–0 | 1–1 | 1–1 | 0–0 | 2–2 |
| Piacenza | 1–1 | 1–3 | 1–0 | 1–0 | 0–0 | 0–1 | 0–2 | 0–1 | 0–0 | 0–0 | 3–1 | 2–0 | 1–2 | 2–1 | 0–0 | — | 0–0 | 1–1 | 2–1 | 1–1 |
| Samb. | 2–1 | 0–0 | 0–0 | 0–0 | 2–2 | 2–2 | 1–2 | 0–0 | 0–0 | 1–2 | 1–0 | 0–0 | 1–0 | 1–1 | 0–1 | 0–0 | — | 2–1 | 1–0 | 0–1 |
| Taranto | 1–0 | 0–0 | 2–2 | 0–2 | 0–3 | 2–1 | 0–1 | 1–0 | 1–2 | 3–3 | 1–1 | 1–0 | 1–0 | 1–1 | 0–0 | 0–0 | 1–1 | — | 3–1 | 1–0 |
| Triestina | 1–0 | 0–0 | 1–1 | 2–0 | 2–0 | 1–0 | 0–0 | 2–1 | 1–0 | 1–0 | 2–0 | 1–0 | 1–0 | 1–1 | 2–3 | 0–1 | 0–0 | 4–6 | — | 1–0 |
| Udinese | 1–1 | 0–3 | 0–0 | 2–0 | 2–2 | 1–0 | 0–0 | 1–1 | 2–0 | 0–0 | 2–2 | 1–0 | 1–0 | 0–1 | 2–1 | 2–0 | 3–2 | 3–0 | 1–0 | — |

Legend: Blue = home team win; Yellow = draw; Red = away team win.

== Attendances ==
| # | Club | Average |
|---|---|---|
| 1 | Lazio | 29,790 |
| 2 | Bologna | 24,010 |
| 3 | Udinese | 20,252 |
| 4 | Lecce | 18,024 |
| 5 | Atalanta | 17,388 |
| 6 | Bari | 15,830 |
| 7 | Padova | 12,849 |
| 8 | Parma | 10,292 |
| 9 | Genoa | 9,856 |
| 10 | Messina | 9,711 |
| 11 | Catanzaro | 9,349 |
| 12 | Brescia | 9,284 |
| 13 | Barletta | 8,763 |
| 14 | Cremonese | 8,525 |
| 15 | Taranto | 8,217 |
| 16 | Modena | 7,602 |
| 17 | Piacenza | 7,576 |
| 18 | Triestina | 7,246 |
| 19 | Sambenedettese | 5,938 |
| 20 | Arezzo | 5,075 |

== References and sources ==
- Almanacco Illustrato del Calcio - La Storia 1898-2004, Panini Edizioni, Modena, September 2005
- 1987–88 in Italian Football at RSSSF.com

Specific
