= 2023–24 Brescia Calcio season =

Brescia Calcio
2023–24 season
- Manager: Daniele Gastaldello (until 10 November); Luca Belingheri (caretaker, 10–14 November); Rolando Maran (from 14 November)
- Stadium: Stadio Mario Rigamonti
- Serie B: 7th
- Top goalscorer: League: Gabriele Moncini (6); All: Gabriele Moncini (6)

The 2023–24 season was Brescia Calcio's 113th season in existence and the club's fourth consecutive season in the second division of Italian football. The season covered the period from 1 July 2023 to 30 June 2024.

== Players ==
=== First-team squad ===
As of 8 September 2023

Note: Flags indicate national team as defined under FIFA eligibility rules; some limited exceptions apply. Players may hold more than one non-FIFA nationality.

No.	Pos.	Nation	Player
1	GK	ITA	Luca Lezzerini
3	DF	FRA	Matthieu Huard
4	MF	ITA	Fabrizio Paghera
5	MF	NED	Tom van de Looi
6	DF	ALG	Mohamed Farès (on loan from Lazio)
7	MF	ISL	Birkir Bjarnason
8	MF	ALB	Emanuele Ndoj
9	FW	ITA	Flavio Bianchi
11	FW	ITA	Gabriele Moncini
12	GK	ITA	Simone Cortese
14	MF	ITA	Massimiliano Mangraviti
15	DF	ITA	Andrea Cistana
16	DF	ITA	Corrado Riviera
18	DF	SWE	Alexander Jallow
19	DF	ITA	Elia Maccherini Tonini

No.	Pos.	Nation	Player
20	MF	ITA	Patrick Nuamah
21	MF	ITA	Riccardo Fogliata
22	GK	ITA	Lorenzo Andrenacci
23	MF	ITA	Nicolas Galazzi
24	DF	ITA	Lorenzo Dickmann (on loan from SPAL)
25	MF	ITA	Dimitri Bisoli (Captain)
26	MF	ITA	Massimo Bertagnoli
27	MF	ITA	Giacomo Olzer
28	DF	ITA	Davide Adorni
29	FW	ITA	Gennaro Borrelli (on loan from Frosinone)
31	FW	ITA	Matteo Ferro
32	DF	ITA	Andrea Papetti
33	DF	ALB	Zylyf Muça
36	MF	ITA	Vincenzo Garofalo
39	MF	ITA	Michele Besaggio

== Transfers ==
=== In ===
Pos.	Player	Transferred from	Fee	Date	Source
FW	(Italy) Gabriele Moncini	(Italy) Benevento	€1.00m	1 July 2023	
DF	(Italy) Lorenzo Dickmann	(Italy) SPAL	Loan fee €200k	1 July 2023	
MF	(Iceland) Birkir Bjarnason	(Norway) Viking	Undisclosed	1 July 2023	
MF	(Italy) Michele Besaggio	(Italy) Genoa	Undisclosed	1 July 2023	
MF	(Italy) Fabrizio Paghera	(Italy) Ternana	Undisclosed	1 July 2023	
DF	(Algeria) Mohamed Farès	(Italy) Lazio	Loan	1 July 2023	
FW	(Italy) Gennaro Borrelli	(Italy) Frosinone	Loan	1 July 2023	

=== Out ===
Pos.	Player	Transferred to	Fee	Date	Source
DF	(Australia) Fran Karačić	Released		1 July 2023	
MF	(Brazil) Adryan	Released		1 July 2023	
DF	(Italy) Federico Pace	Released		1 July 2023	
MF	(France) Florian Ayé	(France) Auxerre	€1.50m	1 July 2023	
MF	(Poland) Jakub Labojko	(Italy) Ternana	Free	1 July 2023	
FW	(Netherlands) Reuven Niemeijer	(Netherlands) RKC Waalwijk	Free	1 July 2023	
MF	(Italy) Manuel Scavone	(Italy) FC Bolzano 1996	Free	1 July 2023	
MF	(Italy) Simone Ferrari	(Italy) Desenzano	Free	1 July 2023	
MF	(Italy) Federico Viviani	(Italy) Ternana	Undisclosed	1 July 2023	
MF	(Italy) Luca Sonzogni	(Italy) Mantova	Undisclosed	1 July 2023	

== Pre-season and friendlies ==
Win Draw Loss Fixtures

8 September 2023 Friendly	Brescia (Italy)	Cancelled	(Italy) Genoa	Torbole Casaglia
11:00		Report		Stadium: centro sportivo di Torbole Casaglia

== Competitions ==
=== Overview ===
Competition	First match	Last match	Starting round	Record							
Competition	First match	Last match	Starting round	Pld	W	D	L	GF	GA	GD	Win %
Serie B	22 August 2023	10 May 2024	Matchday 1	35	11	14	10	38	35	+3	31.43
Total				35	11	14	10	38	35	+3	31.43

Last updated: 27 April 2024
Source: Competitions

=== Serie B ===
==== League table ====
Pos	Team	Pld	W	D	L	GF	GA	GD	Pts	Promotion, qualification or relegation
6	Palermo	38	15	11	12	62	53	+9	56	Qualification for promotion play-offs preliminary round
7	Sampdoria (Note: Sampdoria were deducted 2 points due to failure in paying taxes between January and March 2023.)	38	16	9	13	53	50	+3	55	Qualification for promotion play-offs preliminary round
8	Brescia	38	12	15	11	44	40	+4	51	Qualification for promotion play-offs preliminary round
9	Cosenza	38	11	14	13	47	42	+5	47 (Note: Head-to-head points: Cosenza 11, Modena 11, Reggiana 7, Südtirol 3. Head-to-head goal difference: Cosenza +6, Modena +2.)	
10	Modena	38	10	17	11	41	47	−6	47	

Source: Soccerway (in English)
Rules for classification: 1) Points; 2) Head-to-head points; 3) Head-to-head goal difference; 4) Goal difference; 5) Goals scored; 6) Draw.
(Note: Head-to-head record is used only after all the matches between the teams in question have been played)

==== Results summary ====
Overall								Home						Away					
Pld	W	D	L	GF	GA	GD	Pts	W	D	L	GF	GA	GD	W	D	L	GF	GA	GD
35	11	14	10	38	35	+3	47	6	8	4	20	16	+4	5	6	6	18	19	−1

Last updated: 27 April 2024.
Source: Worldfootball

==== Results by round ====
Round	1	2	3	4	5	6	7	8	9	10	11	12	13	14	15	16	17	18	19	20	21	22
Ground	H	A	H	H	A	H	A	H	H	A	H	A	H	A	H	A	H	A	H	A	H	A
Result	L	L	D	W	W	D	D	D	D	W	L	L	L	D	W	D	W	W	L	W	D	L
Position	16	18	17	13	9	10	9	10	11	9	11	13	14	15	10	12	9	9	9	8	8	9

Updated to match(es) played on 24 February 2024. Source: Worldfootball
A = Away; H = Home; W = Win; D = Draw; L = Loss

==== Matches ====
The league fixtures were unveiled on 11 July 2023.

3 September 2023 4	Brescia	1–0	Cosenza	Brescia
16:15 CEST (UTC+2)		Report		Stadium: Stadio Mario Rigamonti

23 September 2023 6	Brescia	0–0	Venezia	Brescia
14:00 CEST (UTC+2)				Stadium: Stadio Mario Rigamonti; Referee: Luca Zufferli

26 September 2023 7	Spezia	0–0	Brescia	La Spezia
20:30 CEST (UTC+2)				Stadium: Stadio Alberto Picco

6 October 2023 9	Brescia	1–1	Feralpisalò	Brescia
20:30 CEST (UTC+2)				Stadium: Stadio Mario Rigamonti; Referee: Davide Di Marco

21 October 2023 10	Ternana	0–1	Brescia	Terni
14:00 CEST (UTC+2)				Stadium: Stadio Libero Liberati; Referee: Kevin Bonacina

24 October 2023 1	Brescia	0–1	Modena	Brescia
18:30 CEST (UTC+2)				Stadium: Stadio Mario Rigamonti

29 October 2023 11	Brescia	1–2	Bari	Brescia
14:00 CET (UTC+1)				Stadium: Stadio Mario Rigamonti; Referee: Marco Guida

4 November 2023 12	Cittadella	3–2	Brescia	Cittadella
14:00 CET (UTC+1)				Stadium: Stadio Pier Cesare Tombolato; Referee: Daniele Perenzoni

8 November 2023 2	Palermo	1–0	Brescia	Palermo
18:30 CET (UTC+1)				Stadium: Stadio Renzo Barbera

12 November 2023 13	Brescia	0–3	Cremonese	Brescia
16:15 CET (UTC+1)				Stadium: Stadio Mario Rigamonti; Referee: Livio Marinelli

28 November 2023 3	Südtirol	1–1	Brescia	Bolzano
18:30 CET (UTC+1)

24 February 2024 26	Brescia	0–0	Reggiana	Brescia
14:00 CET (UTC+1)				Stadium: Stadio Mario Rigamonti

2 March 2024 27	Brescia	4–2	Palermo	Brescia
14:00 CET (UTC+1)				Stadium: Stadio Mario Rigamonti; Referee: Daniele Rutella

20 April 2024 34	Brescia	0–0	Ternana	Brescia
14:00 CEST (UTC+2)		Report		Stadium: Stadio Mario Rigamonti; Referee: Kevin Bonacina

27 April 2024 35	Brescia	0–0	Spezia	Brescia
14:00 CEST (UTC+2)		Report		Stadium: Stadio Mario Rigamonti; Referee: Gianluca Manganiello

1 May 2024 36	Feralpisalò	v	Brescia	Piacenza
18:00		Report		Stadium: Stadio Leonardo Garilli

5 May 2024 37	Brescia	v	Lecco	Brescia
15:00 CEST (UTC+2)				Stadium: Stadio Mario Rigamonti

10 May 2024 38	Bari	v	Brescia	Bari
20:30 CEST (UTC+2)				Stadium: Stadio San Nicola

==== Promotion play-offs ====
18 May 2024 Preliminary round	Catanzaro	v	Brescia	Catanzaro
20:30				Stadium: Stadio Nicola Ceravolo
