= 2021–22 Brescia Calcio season =

Brescia
- Owner: Massimo Cellino
- President: Massimo Cellino
- Head coach: Filippo Inzaghi (until 23 March); Eugenio Corini (from 23 March)
- Stadium: Stadio Mario Rigamonti
- Serie B: 5th
- Play-offs: Semi-finals
- Coppa Italia: First round
| Home colours | Away colours | Third colours |

The 2021–22 season was Brescia Calcio's second consecutive season in second division of the Italian football league, the Serie B, and the 111th as a football club.

== Players ==
=== First-team squad ===
Note: Flags indicate national team as defined under FIFA eligibility rules; some limited exceptions apply. Players may hold more than one non-FIFA nationality.

| No. | Pos. | Nation | Player |
|---|---|---|---|
| 1 | GK | FIN | Jesse Joronen |
| 2 | DF | AUS | Fran Karačić |
| 3 | DF | ITA | Stefano Sabelli (on loan from Genoa) |
| 4 | DF | VEN | Jhon Chancellor |
| 5 | MF | NED | Tom van de Looi |
| 6 | DF | ITA | Davide Adorni |
| 7 | FW | SVK | Nikolas Špalek |
| 8 | FW | ARG | Rodrigo Palacio |
| 9 | FW | ITA | Stefano Moreo |
| 11 | FW | BIH | Riad Bajić (on loan from Udinese) |
| 12 | GK | ITA | Simone Perilli |
| 14 | MF | ITA | Massimiliano Mangraviti |
| 15 | DF | ITA | Andrea Cistana |
| 18 | MF | FIN | Simon Skrabb |
| 19 | DF | FRA | Matthieu Huard |

| No. | Pos. | Nation | Player |
|---|---|---|---|
| 20 | FW | FRA | Florian Ayé |
| 21 | GK | ITA | Lorenzo Andrenacci (on loan from Genoa) |
| 23 | MF | ITA | Federico Proia (on loan from Vicenza) |
| 24 | MF | POL | Filip Jagiełło |
| 25 | MF | ITA | Dimitri Bisoli (Captain) |
| 26 | MF | ITA | Massimo Bertagnoli |
| 27 | MF | FRA | Mattéo Tramoni (on loan from Cagliari) |
| 28 | MF | ITA | Giacomo Olzer |
| 29 | MF | CRO | Marko Pajač |
| 30 | MF | SUI | Valon Behrami |
| 31 | MF | ITA | Lorenzo Andreoli |
| 32 | DF | ITA | Andrea Papetti |
| 37 | MF | FRA | Mehdi Léris (on loan from Sampdoria) |
| — | FW | ITA | Flavio Bianchi (on loan from Genoa) |

=== Out on loan ===
Note: Flags indicate national team as defined under FIFA eligibility rules; some limited exceptions apply. Players may hold more than one non-FIFA nationality.

| No. | Pos. | Nation | Player |
|---|---|---|---|
| — | GK | ITA | Federico Botti (at Siena until 30 June 2022) |
| — | DF | ITA | Mattia Capoferri (at Lecco until 30 June 2022) |
| — | DF | ITA | Nicolò Verzeni (at Pergolettese until 30 June 2022) |
| — | MF | POL | Jakub Łabojko (at AEK Larnaca until 30 June 2022) |

| No. | Pos. | Nation | Player |
|---|---|---|---|
| — | MF | ALB | Emanuele Ndoj (at Cosenza until 30 June 2022) |
| — | MF | ITA | Simone Ferrari (at Giana Erminio until 30 June 2022) |
| — | FW | ITA | Alfredo Donnarumma (at Ternana until 30 June 2022, obligation to buy) |
| — | FW | ITA | Andrea Ghezzi (at Pro Sesto until 30 June 2022) |

== Pre-season and friendlies ==
Win Draw Loss

| 1 August 2021 Friendly | Brescia (Italy) | 1–0 | (Italy) Mantova | Torbole Casaglia, Italy |
| 18:00 CEST (UTC+2) | | | | Stadium: Campo Sportivo Comunale Mazzocchi |

| 7 August 2021 Friendly | Brescia (Italy) | Cancelled | (Italy) Reggiana | Desenzano del Garda, Italy |
| 18:00 CEST (UTC+2) | | | | Stadium: Stadio Tre Stelle |

| 4 September 2021 Friendly | Brescia (Italy) | 4–0 | (Italy) Venezia | Brescia, Italy |
| 17:00 CEST (UTC+2) | Bisoli 13'; Moreo 40'; Bajić 83'; Jagiełło 87' | | | Stadium: Stadio Mario Rigamonti |

== Competitions ==
=== Overall record ===
| Competition | First match | Last match | Starting round | Final position | Record | | | | | | | |
| Competition | First match | Last match | Starting round | Final position | Pld | W | D | L | GF | GA | GD | Win % |
|---|---|---|---|---|---|---|---|---|---|---|---|---|
| Serie B | 22 August 2021 | 6 May 2022 | Matchday 1 | 5th | 38 | 17 | 15 | 6 | 55 | 35 | +20 | 44.74 |
| Serie B promotion play-offs | 14 May 2022 | 22 May 2022 | Preliminary round | Semi-finals | 3 | 1 | 0 | 2 | 5 | 6 | −1 | 33.33 |
| Coppa Italia | 16 August 2021 | | First round | First round | 1 | 0 | 1 | 0 | 2 | 2 | +0 | 0.00 |
| Total | | | | | 42 | 18 | 16 | 8 | 62 | 43 | +19 | 42.86 |

Source: Soccerway

=== Serie B ===
==== League table ====
| Pos | Team | Pld | W | D | L | GF | GA | GD | Pts | Promotion, qualification or relegation |
|---|---|---|---|---|---|---|---|---|---|---|
| 3 | Pisa | 38 | 18 | 13 | 7 | 48 | 35 | +13 | 67 (Note: Pisa finished ahead of Monza on head-to-head points: Pisa 2–1 Monza, Monza 1–2 Pisa.) | Qualification for promotion play-offs semi-finals |
| 4 | Monza (O, P) | 38 | 19 | 10 | 9 | 60 | 38 | +22 | 67 | Qualification for promotion play-offs semi-finals |
| 5 | Brescia | 38 | 17 | 15 | 6 | 55 | 35 | +20 | 66 | Qualification for promotion play-offs preliminary round |
| 6 | Ascoli | 38 | 19 | 8 | 11 | 52 | 42 | +10 | 65 | Qualification for promotion play-offs preliminary round |
| 7 | Benevento | 38 | 18 | 9 | 11 | 62 | 39 | +23 | 63 | Qualification for promotion play-offs preliminary round |

Source: Lega Serie B (in Italian), Soccerway (in English)
Rules for classification: 1) Points; 2) Head-to-head points; 3) Head-to-head goal difference; 4) Goal difference; 5) Goals scored; 6) Draw.
(O) Play-off winners; (P) Promoted

==== Results summary ====
| Overall | | | | | | | | Home | | | | | | Away | | | | | |
| Pld | W | D | L | GF | GA | GD | Pts | W | D | L | GF | GA | GD | W | D | L | GF | GA | GD |
|---|---|---|---|---|---|---|---|---|---|---|---|---|---|---|---|---|---|---|---|
| 38 | 17 | 15 | 6 | 55 | 35 | +20 | 66 | 8 | 8 | 3 | 30 | 20 | +10 | 9 | 7 | 3 | 25 | 15 | +10 |

Source: Serie A

==== Results by round ====
| Round | 1 | 2 | 3 | 4 | 5 | 6 | 7 | 8 | 9 | 10 | 11 | 12 | 13 | 14 | 15 | 16 | 17 | 18 | 19 | 20 | 21 | 22 | 23 | 24 | 25 | 26 | 27 | 28 | 29 | 30 | 31 | 32 | 33 | 34 | 35 | 36 | 37 | 38 |
|---|---|---|---|---|---|---|---|---|---|---|---|---|---|---|---|---|---|---|---|---|---|---|---|---|---|---|---|---|---|---|---|---|---|---|---|---|---|---|
| Ground | A | H | A | H | A | A | H | A | H | H | A | H | A | H | A | H | A | H | A | H | A | H | A | H | H | A | H | A | A | H | A | H | A | H | A | H | A | H |
| Result | W | W | W | D | D | W | L | L | W | D | W | W | W | L | W | L | W | D | W | D | D | D | W | D | W | D | W | L | D | D | D | W | D | W | D | D | L | W |
| Position | 2 | 1 | 1 | 2 | 3 | 2 | 3 | 4 | 2 | 4 | 2 | 1 | 1 | 2 | 1 | 3 | 2 | 2 | 2 | 2 | 3 | 4 | 3 | 4 | 1 | 3 | 2 | 4 | 4 | 5 | 5 | 5 | 5 | 4 | 6 | 5 | 6 | 5 |

Source: Serie A
A = Away; H = Home; W = Win; D = Draw; L = Loss

==== Matches ====
The league fixtures were announced on 24 July 2021.

| 22 August 2021 1 | Ternana | 0–2 | Brescia | Terni |
| --:-- CEST (UTC+2) |

| 27 August 2021 2 | Brescia | 5–1 | Cosenza | Brescia |
| --:-- CEST (UTC+2) | | | | Stadium: Stadio Mario Rigamonti |

| 11 September 2021 3 | Alessandria | 1–3 | Brescia | Alessandria |
| --:-- CEST (UTC+2) |

| 17 September 2021 4 | Brescia | 2–2 | Crotone | Brescia |
| --:-- CEST (UTC+2) | | | | Stadium: Stadio Mario Rigamonti |

| 20 September 2021 5 | Frosinone | 2–2 | Brescia | Frosinone |
| --:-- CEST (UTC+2) |

| 25 September 2021 6 | Ascoli | 2–3 | Brescia | Ascoli Piceno |
| --:-- CEST (UTC+2) |

| 3 October 2021 7 | Brescia | 2–4 | Como | Brescia |
| --:-- CEST (UTC+2) | | | | Stadium: Stadio Mario Rigamonti |

| 16 October 2021 8 | Perugia | 1–0 | Brescia | Perugia |
| --:-- CEST (UTC+2) |

| 23 October 2021 9 | Brescia | 1–0 | Cremonese | Brescia |
| --:-- CEST (UTC+2) | | | | Stadium: Stadio Mario Rigamonti |

| 28 October 2021 10 | Brescia | 1–1 | Lecce | Brescia |
| 18:00 CEST (UTC+2) | Bisoli 87' | Report | Dermaku 81'; Hjulmand (yellow card) 85' | Stadium: Stadio Mario Rigamonti; Referee: Massimiliano Irrati |

| 1 November 2021 11 | Benevento | 0–1 | Brescia | Benevento |
| --:-- CET (UTC+1) |

| 6 November 2021 12 | Brescia | 1–0 | Pordenone | Brescia |
| --:-- CET (UTC+1) | | | | Stadium: Stadio Mario Rigamonti |

| 20 November 2021 13 | Vicenza | 2–3 | Brescia | Vicenza |
| --:-- CET (UTC+1) |

| 27 November 2021 14 | Brescia | 0–1 | Pisa | Brescia |
| --:-- CET (UTC+1) | | | | Stadium: Stadio Mario Rigamonti |

| 1 December 2021 15 | Parma | 0–1 | Brescia | Parma |
| --:-- CET (UTC+1) |

| 5 December 2021 16 | Brescia | 0–2 | Monza | Brescia |
| --:-- CET (UTC+1) | | | | Stadium: Stadio Mario Rigamonti |

| 11 December 2021 17 | SPAL | 0–2 | Brescia | Ferrara |
| --:-- CET (UTC+1) |

| 19 December 2021 18 | Brescia | 1–1 | Cittadella | Brescia |
| --:-- CET (UTC+1) | | | | Stadium: Stadio Mario Rigamonti |

| 15 January 2022 19 | Reggina | 0–2 | Brescia | Reggio Calabria |
| --:-- CET (UTC+1) |

| 22 January 2022 20 | Brescia | 1–1 | Ternana | Brescia |
| --:-- CET (UTC+1) | | | | Stadium: Stadio Mario Rigamonti |

| 5 February 2022 21 | Cosenza | 0–0 | Brescia | Cosenza |
| --:-- CET (UTC+1) |

| 13 February 2022 22 | Brescia | 1–1 | Alessandria | Brescia |
| --:-- CET (UTC+1) | | | | Stadium: Stadio Mario Rigamonti |

| 16 February 2022 23 | Crotone | 0–1 | Brescia | Crotone |
| --:-- CET (UTC+1) |

| 20 February 2022 24 | Brescia | 2–2 | Frosinone | Brescia |
| --:-- CET (UTC+1) | | | | Stadium: Stadio Mario Rigamonti |

| 23 February 2022 25 | Brescia | 2–0 | Ascoli | Brescia |
| --:-- CET (UTC+1) | | | | Stadium: Stadio Mario Rigamonti |

| 26 February 2022 26 | Como | 1–1 | Brescia | Como |
| --:-- CET (UTC+1) |

| 1 March 2022 27 | Brescia | 2–1 | Perugia | Brescia |
| --:-- CET (UTC+1) | | | | Stadium: Stadio Mario Rigamonti |

| 5 March 2022 28 | Cremonese | 2–1 | Brescia | Cremona |
| --:-- CET (UTC+1) |

| 12 March 2022 29 | Lecce | 1–1 | Brescia | Lecce |
| 14:00 CET (UTC+1) | Barreca (yellow card) 11'; Strefezza 19'; Plizzari (yellow card) 29' | Report | Van de Looi (yellow card) 7'; Pajač (penalty missed) 30'; Bisoli 30'; Sabelli (yellow card) 42'; Proia (yellow card) 57' | Stadium: Stadio Via del mare Referee: Michael Fabbri |

| 15 March 2022 30 | Brescia | 2–2 | Benevento | Brescia |
| --:-- CET (UTC+1) | | | | Stadium: Stadio Mario Rigamonti |

| 20 March 2022 31 | Pordenone | 1–1 | Brescia | Pordenone |
| --:-- CET (UTC+1) |

| 3 April 2022 32 | Brescia | 2–0 | Vicenza | Brescia |
| --:-- CEST (UTC+2) | | | | Stadium: Stadio Mario Rigamonti |

| 6 April 2022 33 | Pisa | 0–0 | Brescia | Pisa |
| 19:00 CEST (UTC+2) | | Report | | Stadium: Arena Garibaldi – Stadio Romeo Anconetani; Referee: Alberto Santoro |

| 11 April 2022 34 | Brescia | 1–0 | Parma | Brescia |
| 20:30 CEST (UTC+2) | Moreo 64' | Report | | Stadium: Stadio Mario Rigamonti; Referee: Davide Ghersini |

| 18 April 2022 35 | Monza | 1–1 | Brescia | Monza |
| 20:30 CEST (UTC+2) | Machín 49' | Report | Bisoli 81' | Stadium: Stadio Brianteo; Referee: Livio Marinelli |

| 25 April 2022 36 | Brescia | 1–1 | SPAL | Brescia |
| 18:00 CEST (UTC+2) | Tramoni 84' | Report | Latte Lath 90+4' | Stadium: Stadio Mario Rigamonti; Referee: Antonio Rapuano |

| 6 May 2022 38 | Brescia | 3–0 | Reggina | Brescia |
| 20:30 CEST (UTC+2) | Van de Looi 33'; Tramoni 47'; Cistana 87' | Report | | Stadium: Stadio Mario Rigamonti; Referee: Matteo Marchetti |

==== Promotion play-offs ====
| 14 May 2022 Preliminary round | Brescia | 3–2 (a.e.t.) | Perugia | Brescia |
| 18:00 CEST (UTC+2) | Pajač 45+6' (pen.); Ayé 107'; Bianchi 118' | Report | Kouan 10'; Matos 102' | Stadium: Stadio Mario Rigamonti; Referee: Francesco Fourneau |

| 18 May 2022 Semi-finals; First leg | Brescia | 1–2 | Monza | Brescia |
| 20:00 CEST (UTC+2) | Moreo 7' | Report | Gytkjær 44', 56' (pen.) | Stadium: Stadio Mario Rigamonti; Referee: Gianluca Aureliano |

| 22 May 2022 Semi-final; Second leg | Monza | 2–1 (4–2 agg.) | Brescia | Monza |
| 21:00 CEST (UTC+2) | | Report | | Stadium: Stadio Brianteo |

=== Coppa Italia ===
| 16 August 2021 First round | Crotone | 2–2 (a.e.t.) (4–2 p) | Brescia | Crotone |
| 17:45 CEST (UTC+1) | Vulić 26'; Mulattieri 77' | Report | Van de Loi 46'; Bajić 67' | Stadium: Stadio Ezio Scida; Attendance: 1,500; Referee: Luca Massimi |
| | Penalties |
| | Molina (penalty scored); Benali (penalty scored); Mogoș (penalty scored); Vulić (penalty scored) | | (penalty scored) Bajić; (penalty missed) Moreo; (penalty missed) Ndoj; (penalty scored) Spalek |
