= 2022–23 Brescia Calcio season =

Brescia
2022–23 season
- Owner: Massimo Cellino
- President: Massimo Cellino
- Head coach: Pep Clotet (until 21 December); Alfredo Aglietti (from 21 December to 16 January); Pep Clotet (from 16 January to 6 February); Davide Possanzini (from 6 to 20 February); Daniele Gastaldello (from 20 February)
- Stadium: Stadio Mario Rigamonti
- Serie B: 16th
- Coppa Italia: Round of 32
- Top goalscorer: League: Florian Ayé (8); All: Florian Ayé (9)
- Biggest defeat: Bari 6–2 Brescia

The 2022–23 season was the 112th season in the history of Brescia Calcio and their third consecutive season in the second division. The club participated in Serie B and the Coppa Italia.

== Players ==
As of 2 February 2023

Note: Flags indicate national team as defined under FIFA eligibility rules; some limited exceptions apply. Players may hold more than one non-FIFA nationality.

| No. | Pos. | Nation | Player |
|---|---|---|---|
| 1 | GK | ITA | Lorenzo Andrenacci |
| 2 | DF | AUS | Fran Karačić |
| 3 | DF | FRA | Matthieu Huard |
| 4 | DF | ITA | Davide Adorni |
| 5 | MF | NED | Tom van de Looi |
| 6 | MF | ITA | Nicolas Galazzi |
| 7 | MF | ITA | Federico Viviani |
| 8 | MF | ALB | Emanuele Ndoj |
| 9 | FW | ESP | Pablo Rodríguez (on loan from Lecce) |
| 11 | FW | FRA | Florian Ayé |
| 12 | GK | ITA | Luca Lezzerini |
| 14 | MF | ITA | Massimiliano Mangraviti |
| 15 | DF | ITA | Andrea Cistana |
| 16 | MF | ITA | Manuel Scavone |
| 18 | DF | SWE | Alexander Jallow |

| No. | Pos. | Nation | Player |
|---|---|---|---|
| 19 | MF | ITA | Patrick Nuamah |
| 20 | MF | NED | Reuven Niemeijer |
| 21 | MF | POL | Jakub Łabojko |
| 22 | MF | ITA | Luca Sonzogni |
| 23 | MF | SWE | John Björkengren (on loan from Lecce) |
| 24 | FW | ITA | Flavio Bianchi (on loan from Genoa) |
| 25 | MF | ITA | Dimitri Bisoli (Captain) |
| 26 | MF | ITA | Massimo Bertagnoli |
| 27 | MF | ITA | Giacomo Olzer |
| 28 | DF | FRA | Alexandre Coeff |
| 29 | MF | POL | Marcin Listkowski (on loan from Lecce) |
| 30 | DF | ITA | Federico Pace |
| 32 | DF | ITA | Andrea Papetti |
| 94 | MF | BRA | Adryan |

=== Out on loan ===
Note: Flags indicate national team as defined under FIFA eligibility rules; some limited exceptions apply. Players may hold more than one non-FIFA nationality.

| No. / Pos. / Nation / Player; — / MF / ITA / Simone Ferrari (at Chievo Sona until 30 June 2023) | No. / Pos. / Nation / Player; — / MF / ITA / Vincenzo Garofalo (at Trento until 30 June 2023) |

== Pre-season and friendlies ==
Win Draw Loss Fixtures

| 23 July 2022 Friendly | Brescia (Italy) | 0–2 | (Italy) Sampdoria | Brescia |
| 18:00 CEST (UTC+2) | Niemeijer (yellow card) 55'; Adorni (yellow card) 65'; Papetti (yellow card) 86' | | Sabiri 32'; De Luca 48' | Stadium: Stadio Mario Rigamonti; Attendance: 1,670; Referee: Giovanni Ayroldi |

| 27 July 2022 Friendly | Brescia (Italy) | 5–1 | (Italy) Lecco | Torbole Casaglia |
| 18:00 CEST (UTC+2) | Bianchi 26'; Olzer 36'; Ayé 70', 80' (pen.); Ndoj 74' (pen.) | | Scapuzzi 57' | Stadium: Campo Sportivo Comunale Mazzocchi; Attendance: 0 Referee: Ferrieri Caputi |

| 30 July 2022 Friendly | Brescia (Italy) | 4–1 | (Italy) Mantova | Torbole Casaglia |
| 18:00 CEST (UTC+2) | Moreo 26'; Ndoj 28'; Bianchi 51'; Bertagnoli 53' | | Fontana 26' | Stadium: Campo Sportivo Comunale Mazzocchi; Referee: Matteo Gariglio |

== Competitions ==
=== Overall record ===
| Competition | First match | Last match | Starting round | Final position | Record | | | | | | | |
| Competition | First match | Last match | Starting round | Final position | Pld | W | D | L | GF | GA | GD | Win % |
|---|---|---|---|---|---|---|---|---|---|---|---|---|
| Serie B | 14 August 2022 | 19 May 2023 | Matchday 1 | 16th | 38 | 9 | 13 | 16 | 36 | 57 | −21 | 23.68 |
| Coppa Italia | 6 August 2022 | 18 October 2022 | Round of 64 | Round of 32 | 2 | 1 | 0 | 1 | 5 | 4 | +1 | 50.00 |
| Total | | | | | 40 | 10 | 13 | 17 | 41 | 61 | −20 | 25.00 |

Source: Soccerway

=== Serie B ===
==== League table ====
| Pos | Team | Pld | W | D | L | GF | GA | GD | Pts | Promotion, qualification or relegation |
|---|---|---|---|---|---|---|---|---|---|---|
| 14 | Ternana | 38 | 11 | 10 | 17 | 37 | 52 | −15 | 43 (Note: Ternana finished ahead of Cittadella on head-to-head goal difference: Cittadella 0–2 Ternana, Ternana 1–2 Cittadella.) | |
| 15 | Cittadella | 38 | 9 | 16 | 13 | 34 | 45 | −11 | 43 | |
| 16 | Brescia | 38 | 9 | 13 | 16 | 36 | 57 | −21 | 40 | Spared from relegation |
| 17 | Cosenza (O) | 38 | 9 | 13 | 16 | 30 | 53 | −23 | 40 | Qualification for relegation play-out |
| 18 | Perugia (R) | 38 | 10 | 9 | 19 | 40 | 52 | −12 | 39 | Relegation to Serie C |

Source: Soccerway (in English)
Rules for classification: 1) Points; 2) Head-to-head points; 3) Head-to-head goal difference; 4) Goal difference; 5) Goals scored; 6) Draw.
(O) Play-off winners; (R) Relegated

==== Results summary ====
| Overall | | | | | | | | Home | | | | | | Away | | | | | |
| Pld | W | D | L | GF | GA | GD | Pts | W | D | L | GF | GA | GD | W | D | L | GF | GA | GD |
|---|---|---|---|---|---|---|---|---|---|---|---|---|---|---|---|---|---|---|---|
| 0 | 0 | 0 | 0 | 0 | 0 | 0 | 0 | 0 | 0 | 0 | 0 | 0 | 0 | 0 | 0 | 0 | 0 | 0 | 0 |

Source: Serie B

==== Results by round ====
| Round | 1 | 2 | 3 | 4 | 5 | 6 | 7 | 8 | 9 | 10 | 11 | 12 | 13 | 14 | 15 | 16 | 17 | 18 | 19 | 20 | 21 | 22 | 23 | 24 | 25 | 26 | 27 | 28 | 29 | 30 | 31 | 32 | 33 | 34 | 35 | 36 | 37 | 38 |
|---|---|---|---|---|---|---|---|---|---|---|---|---|---|---|---|---|---|---|---|---|---|---|---|---|---|---|---|---|---|---|---|---|---|---|---|---|---|---|
| Ground | H | A | A | H | A | H | A | H | A | H | A | H | A | H | H | A | H | A | H | A | H | H | A | H | A | H | A | H | A | H | A | H | A | A | H | A | H | A |
| Result | W | L | W | W | W | W | L | D | L | D | D | D | D | W | L | D | L | L | D | L | L | L | L | L | L | L | D | D | D | L | L | W | D | W | W | L | D | D |
| Position | 2 | 11 | 6 | 3 | 2 | 2 | 3 | 4 | 7 | 6 | 8 | 8 | 7 | 4 | 6 | 6 | 7 | 10 | 12 | 13 | 13 | 14 | 16 | 17 | 19 | 19 | 18 | 19 | 20 | 20 | 20 | 19 | 19 | 18 | 15 | 17 | 17 | 16 |

Source: Serie B
A = Away; H = Home; W = Win; D = Draw; L = Loss

==== Matches ====
The league fixtures will be announced in July 2022.

| 14 August 2022 1 | Brescia | 2–0 | Südtirol | Brescia |
| 20:45 CEST (UTC+2) | | | | Stadium: Stadio Mario Rigamonti |

| 21 August 2022 2 | Frosinone | 3–0 | Brescia | Frosinone |
| 20:45 CEST (UTC+2) | | | | Stadium: Stadio Benito Stirpe |

| 29 August 2022 3 | Como | 0–1 | Brescia | Como |
| CEST (UTC+2) |

| 3 September 2022 4 | Brescia | 2–1 | Perugia | Brescia |
| CEST (UTC+2) | | | | Stadium: Stadio Mario Rigamonti |

| 10 September 2022 5 | Modena | 1–3 | Brescia | Modena |
| CEST (UTC+2) |

| 16 September 2022 6 | Brescia | 1–0 | Benevento | Brescia |
| CEST (UTC+2) | | | | Stadium: Stadio Mario Rigamonti |

| 1 October 2022 7 | Bari | 6–2 | Brescia | Bari |
| CEST (UTC+2) |

| 8 October 2022 8 | Brescia | 1–1 | Cittadella | Brescia |
| CEST (UTC+2) | | | | Stadium: Stadio Mario Rigamonti |

| 15 October 2022 9 | Cagliari | 2–1 | Brescia | Cagliari |
| CEST (UTC+2) |

| 22 October 2022 10 | Brescia | 1–1 | Venezia | Brescia |
| CEST (UTC+2) | | | | Stadium: Stadio Mario Rigamonti |

| 29 October 2022 11 | Genoa | 1–1 | Brescia | Genoa |
| CET (UTC+1) |

| 5 November 2022 12 | Brescia | 1–1 | Ascoli | Brescia |
| CET (UTC+1) | | | | Stadium: Stadio Mario Rigamonti |

| 12 November 2022 13 | Ternana | 0–0 | Brescia | Terni |
| CET (UTC+1) |

| 27 November 2022 14 | Brescia | 2–0 | SPAL | Brescia |
| CET (UTC+1) | | | | Stadium: Stadio Mario Rigamonti |

| 4 December 2022 15 | Brescia | 0–2 | Reggina | Brescia |
| CET (UTC+1) | | | | Stadium: Stadio Mario Rigamonti |

| 8 December 2022 16 | Cosenza | 1–1 | Brescia | Cosenza |
| CET (UTC+1) |

| 12 December 2022 17 | Brescia | 0–2 | Parma | Brescia |
| CET (UTC+1) | | | | Stadium: Stadio Mario Rigamonti |

| 17 December 2022 18 | Pisa | 3–0 | Brescia | Pisa |
| CET (UTC+1) |

| 26 December 2022 19 | Brescia | 1–1 | Palermo | Brescia |
| CET (UTC+1) | | | | Stadium: Stadio Mario Rigamonti |

| 15 January 2023 20 | Südtirol | 1–0 | Brescia | Bolzano |
| CET (UTC+1) |

| 22 January 2023 21 | Brescia | 1–3 | Frosinone | Brescia |
| CET (UTC+1) | | | | Stadium: Stadio Mario Rigamonti |

| 28 January 2023 22 | Brescia | 0–1 | Como | Brescia |
| CET (UTC+1) | | | | Stadium: Stadio Mario Rigamonti |

| 4 February 2023 23 | Perugia | 4–0 | Brescia | Perugia |
| CET (UTC+1) |

| 11 February 2023 24 | Brescia | 0–1 | Modena | Brescia |
| CET (UTC+1) | | | | Stadium: Stadio Mario Rigamonti |

| 18 February 2023 25 | Benevento | 1–0 | Brescia | Benevento |
| CET (UTC+1) |

| 25 February 2023 26 | Brescia | 0–2 | Bari | Brescia |
| CET (UTC+1) | | | | Stadium: Stadio Mario Rigamonti |

| 1 March 2023 27 | Cittadella | 0–0 | Brescia | Cittadella |
| CET (UTC+1) |

| 5 March 2023 28 | Brescia | 1–1 | Cagliari | Brescia |
| CET (UTC+1) | | | | Stadium: Stadio Mario Rigamonti |

| 11 March 2023 29 | Venezia | 1–1 | Brescia | Venice |
| CET (UTC+1) |

| 18 March 2023 30 | Brescia | 0–3 | Genoa | Brescia |
| CET (UTC+1) | | | | Stadium: Stadio Mario Rigamonti |

| 1 April 2023 31 | Ascoli | 4–3 | Brescia | Ascoli Piceno |
| CEST (UTC+2) |

| 10 April 2023 32 | Brescia | 1–0 | Ternana | Brescia |
| CEST (UTC+2) | | | | Stadium: Stadio Mario Rigamonti |

| 15 April 2023 33 | SPAL | 2–2 | Brescia | Ferrara |
| CEST (UTC+2) |

| 21 April 2023 34 | Reggina | 1–2 | Brescia | Reggio Calabria |
| CEST (UTC+2) |

| 1 May 2023 35 | Brescia | 2–1 | Cosenza | Brescia |
| CEST (UTC+2) | | | | Stadium: Stadio Mario Rigamonti |

| 7 May 2023 36 | Parma | 2–0 | Brescia | Parma |
| CEST (UTC+2) |

| 13 May 2023 37 | Brescia | 1–1 | Pisa | Brescia |
| CEST (UTC+2) | | | | Stadium: Stadio Mario Rigamonti |

| 19 May 2023 38 | Palermo | 2–2 | Brescia | Palermo |
| CEST (UTC+2) |

=== Coppa Italia ===
| 6 August 2022 Round of 64 | Pisa | 1–4 | Brescia | Pisa |
| 17:45 CEST (UTC+2) | Masucci 20' | Report | Nícolas 25' (o.g.); Karačić (yellow card) 36'; Ayé 61'; Moreo (yellow card) 66'; Ndoj 72'; Bianchi 90+4' | Stadium: Arena Garibaldi; Referee: Matteo Gariglio |

| 19 October 2022 Round of 32 | Spezia | 3–1 | Brescia | La Spezia |
| 15:00 CEST (UTC+2) | Strelec 20', 86'; Ferrer (yellow card) 43'; Verde 55'; Agudelo (yellow card) 79' | Report | Olzer (yellow card) 45+2'; Moreo 90+3' | Stadium: Stadio Alberto Picco; Attendance: 2,500; Referee: Federico La Penna |
