= 2024–25 Brescia Calcio season =

Brescia
2024–25 season
- Owner: Massimo Cellino
- Chairman: Massimo Cellino
- Manager: Rolando Maran (until 9 December); Pierpaolo Bisoli (9 December–28 January); Rolando Maran (from 28 January)
- Stadium: Stadio Mario Rigamonti
- Serie B: 16th
- Coppa Italia: Second round
- Top goalscorer: League: Birkir Bjarnason (4); All: Birkir Bjarnason (4)
- Biggest win: Brescia 4–0 Frosinone
- Biggest defeat: Brescia 2–5 Sassuolo
Home colours	Away colours	Third colours

The 2024–25 season is Brescia Calcio's 114th season in history and their fifth consecutive campaign in Serie B. This was also the club's final season, as the entire club was dissolved following a financial scandal.

== Transfers ==
=== In ===
Pos.	Player	Transferred from	Fee	Date	Source
MF	(Belgium) Matthias Verreth	(Netherlands) Willem II	Undisclosed	1 July 2024	
DF	(Italy) Lorenzo Dickmann	(Italy) SPAL	€250,000	1 July 2024	
GK	(Italy) Michele Avella	(Italy) Frosinone	€5,000	1 July 2024	
FW	(Italy) Gennaro Borrelli	(Italy) Frosinone	€3,500,000	1 July 2024	
FW	(Malta) Trent Buhagiar	(Australia) Newcastle Jets	Free	5 July 2024	
MF	(Italy) Niccolò Corrado	(Italy) Ternana	€480,000	8 July 2024	
FW	(Croatia) Ante Matej Jurič	(Croatia) Gorica	Undisclosed	6 August 2024	
DF	(Italy) Gabriele Calvani	(Italy) Genoa	Loan	9 August 2024	

=== Out ===
Pos.	Player	Transferred to	Fee	Date	Source
MF	(Netherlands) Tom van de Looi	(Portugal) Famalicão	Undisclosed	1 July 2024	
DF	(Italy) Corrado Riviera	(Italy) Renate	Undisclosed	8 July 2024	
DF	(Italy) Massimiliano Mangraviti	(Italy) Cesena	Undisclosed	9 July 2024	
FW	(Italy) Matteo Ferro	(Italy) Lumezzane	Undisclosed	13 July 2024	
GK	(Italy) Simone Cortese	(Italy) Mestre	Free	20 July 2024	
DF	(France) Matthieu Huard	(France) Ajaccio	Free	29 August 2024	

== Friendlies ==
24 July 2024 Friendly	Brescia (Italy)	3–0	(Italy) Pergolettese

27 July 2024 Friendly	Lumezzane (Italy)	1–1	(Italy) Brescia

1 August 2024 Friendly	Brescia (Italy)	2–0	(Italy) Genoa

4 August 2024 Friendly	Brescia (Italy)	2–2	(Italy) Renate

5 September 2024 Friendly	Darfo Boario (Italy)	0–5	(Italy) Brescia

== Competitions ==
=== Overall record ===
Competition	First match	Last match	Starting round	Final position	Record							
Competition	First match	Last match	Starting round	Final position	Pld	W	D	L	GF	GA	GD	Win %
Serie B	16 August 2024	9 May 2025	Matchday 1		20	5	8	7	24	27	−3	25.00
Coppa Italia	11 August 2024	26 September 2024	First round	Second round	2	1	0	1	4	4	+0	50.00
Total					22	6	8	8	28	31	−3	27.27

Last updated: 29 December 2024
Source: Competitions

=== Serie B ===
==== League table ====
Pos	Team	Pld	W	D	L	GF	GA	GD	Pts	Promotion, qualification or relegation
16	Salernitana (R)	38	11	9	18	37	47	−10	42	Qualification for relegation play-out
17	Sampdoria (O)	38	8	17	13	38	49	−11	41	Qualification for relegation play-out
18	Brescia (R, E)	38	9	16	13	41	48	−7	39 (Note: Brescia were deducted 4 points due to administrative irregularities.)	Excluded and folded
19	Cittadella (R)	38	10	9	19	30	56	−26	39	Relegation to Serie C
20	Cosenza (R)	38	7	13	18	32	56	−24	30 (Note: Cosenza were deducted 4 points due to administrative irregularities.)	Relegation to Serie C

Source: Serie BKT
Rules for classification: 1) Points; 2) Head-to-head points; 3) Head-to-head goal difference; 4) Goal difference; 5) Goals scored; 6) Draw.
(Note: Head-to-head record is used only after all the matches between the teams in question have been played)
(E) Eliminated; (O) Play-off winners; (R) Relegated

==== Results summary ====
Overall								Home						Away					
Pld	W	D	L	GF	GA	GD	Pts	W	D	L	GF	GA	GD	W	D	L	GF	GA	GD
20	5	8	7	24	27	−3	23	3	5	3	18	17	+1	2	3	4	6	10	−4

Last updated: 29 December 2024.

==== Results by round ====
Round	1	2	3	4	5	6	7	8	9	10	11	12	13	14	15	16	17	18	19	20	21	22	23	24	25	26	27	28	29	30	31	32	33	34	35	36	37	38
Ground	H	H	A	A	H	A	H	A	H	A	H	A	H	A	H	A	H	A	H	A	H	A	H	A	H	A	H	A	H	A	A	H	A	H	A	H	A	H
Result	W	L	L	W	W	L	W	D	L	L	D	W	L	D	D	L	D	D	D	D	D	D	L	W	D	L	D	L	D	L	W	L	D	L	W	D	D	W
Position	5	12	13	10	2	6	3	5	6	9	9	7	8	8	8	10	11	13	13	13	13	13	15	11	12	13	12	14	14	17	13	16	14	16	15	16	15	15

Updated to match(es) played on 14 May 2025. Source: WorldFootball.net
A = Away; H = Home; W = Win; D = Draw; L = Loss

==== Matches ====
The matches were announced on 10 July 2024.

16 August 2024 1	Brescia	1–0	Palermo	Brescia
20:30	Adorni 90'			Stadium: Stadio Mario Rigamonti; Attendance: 7,706; Referee: Gianluca Aureliano

24 August 2024 2	Brescia	0–1	Cittadella	Brescia
20:30			Pavan (yellow card) 34' (yellow-red card) 59'; Carissoni 63'	Stadium: Stadio Mario Rigamonti; Attendance: 6,716; Referee: Simone Galipò

27 August 2024 3	Reggiana	2–0	Brescia	Reggio Emilia
				Stadium: Mapei Stadium – Città del Tricolore

31 August 2024 4	Südtirol	1–2	Brescia	Bolzano
				Stadium: Stadio Druso

14 September 2024 5	Brescia	4–0	Frosinone	Brescia
				Stadium: Stadio Mario Rigamonti

21 September 2024 6	Pisa	2–1	Brescia	Pisa
				Stadium: Arena Garibaldi – Stadio Romeo Anconetani

30 September 2024 7	Brescia	3–2	Cremonese	Brescia
				Stadium: Stadio Mario Rigamonti

6 October 2024 8	Mantova	1–1	Brescia	Mantua
				Stadium: Stadio Danilo Martelli

19 October 2024 9	Brescia	2–5	Sassuolo	Brescia
17:15				Stadium: Stadio Mario Rigamonti; Attendance: 4,014; Referee: Alessandro Prontera

26 October 2024 10	Cesena	2–0	Brescia	Cesena
15:00	Shpendi 15' (pen.), 53' (pen.)			Stadium: Stadio Dino Manuzzi; Attendance: 11,816; Referee: Kevin Bonacina

29 October 2024 11	Brescia	1–1	Spezia	Brescia
20:30	Verreth 52'		Di Serio 32'; Vignali (yellow card) 49' (yellow-red card) 87'	Stadium: Stadio Mario Rigamonti; Attendance: 5,181; Referee: Gianluca Manganiello

3 November 2024 12	Sampdoria	0–1	Brescia	Genoa
17:15	Pio Riccio (yellow card) 45+1' (yellow-red card) 75'		Bjarnason 69'	Stadium: Stadio Luigi Ferraris; Attendance: 23,082; Referee: Alberto Arena

9 November 2024 13	Brescia	2–3	Cosenza	Brescia
15:00	Bjarnason 77'; Bianchi 90'		Zilli 34'; Mazzocchi 45+1' (pen.); Charlys 90+5'	Stadium: Stadio Mario Rigamonti; Referee: Antonio Santoro

23 November 2024 14	Juve Stabia	0–0	Brescia	Castellammare di Stabia
15:00 UTC+1	Varnier (red card) 15'; Thiam (yellow card) 15'; Rocchetti (yellow card) 44'; Leone (yellow card) 90+1'		Besaggio (yellow card) 27'; Galazzi (yellow card) 54'	Stadium: Stadio Romeo Menti; Referee: Daniele Rutella

30 November 2024 15	Brescia	1–1	Bari	Brescia
15:00 UTC+1	Galazzi 1'		Dorval 24'	Stadium: Stadio Mario Rigamonti; Referee: Antonio Giua

8 December 2024 16	Catanzaro	2–1	Brescia	Catanzaro
15:00 UTC+1	Biasci 43'; Bonini 90+8'		Bjarnason 20'	Stadium: Stadio Nicola Ceravolo; Referee: Mario Perri

15 December 2024 17	Brescia	0–0	Carrarese	Brescia
15:00 UTC+1				Stadium: Stadio Mario Rigamonti; Referee: Marco Monaldi

20 December 2024 18	Salernitana	0–0	Brescia	Salerno
20:30 UTC+1				Stadium: Stadio Arechi; Referee: Kevin Bonacina

26 December 2024 19	Brescia	3–3	Modena	Brescia
15:00 UTC+1				Stadium: Stadio Mario Rigamonti

29 December 2024 20	Cremonese	1–1	Brescia	Cremona
12:30 UTC+1				Stadium: Stadio Giovanni Zini

12 January 2025 21	Brescia	1–1	Sampdoria	Brescia
19:30 UTC+1				Stadium: Stadio Mario Rigamonti

18 January 2025 22	Bari	2–2	Brescia

26 January 2025 23	Brescia	2–3	Catanzaro

2 February 2025 24	Carrarese	1–2	Brescia

7 February 2025 25	Brescia	0–0	Salernitana

15 February 2025 26	Sassuolo	2–0	Brescia

23 February 2025 27	Brescia	0–0	Südtirol

2 March 2025 28	Palermo	1–0	Brescia

8 March 2025 29	Brescia	1–1	Cesena

15 March 2025 30	Frosinone	2–1	Brescia

28 March 2025 31	Spezia	0–1	Brescia

5 April 2025 32	Brescia	1–2	Mantova

12 April 2025 33	Cosenza	1–1	Brescia

25 April 2025 35	Brescia	1–2	Pisa

1 May 2025 36	Cittadella	0–1	Brescia

4 May 2025 37	Brescia	0–0	Juve Stabia
19:30

9 May 2025 38	Modena	2–2	Brescia
20:30

13 May 2025 34	Brescia	2–1	Reggiana
20:30

=== Coppa Italia ===
11 August 2024 First round	Brescia	3–1	Venezia	Brescia
18:00	Borrelli 14'; Olzer 46', 82'		Idzes 89'	Stadium: Stadio Mario Rigamonti; Referee: Maria Sole Ferrieri Caputi

26 September 2024 Second round	Monza	3–1	Brescia	Monza
18:30	Kyriakopoulos 5'; Pessina 11'; Caprari 40' (pen.)		Nuamah 68'	Stadium: Stadio Brianteo; Attendance: 3,782; Referee: Federico Dionisi

== Statistics ==
=== Goalscorers ===
Rank	Pos.	Player	Serie B	Coppa Italia	Total
1	MF	(Iceland) Birkir Bjarnason	4	0	4
2	FW	(Italy) Gennaro Borrelli	2	1	3
2	MF	(Italy) Giacomo Olzer	1	2	3
4	FW	(Croatia) Ante Matej Jurič	2	0	2
4	FW	(Italy) Gabriele Moncini	2	0	2
4	DF	(Italy) Davide Adorni	2	0	2
4	MF	(Belgium) Matthias Verreth	2	0	2
8	MF	(Italy) Michele Besaggio	1	0	1
8	FW	(Italy) Flavio Bianchi	1	0	1
8	DF	(Italy) Niccolò Corrado	1	0	1
8	MF	(Italy) Riccardo Fogliata	1	0	1
8	MF	(Italy) Nicolas Galazzi	1	0	1
8	FW	(Italy) Patrick Nuamah	1	1	1
Own goals			0	0	0
Totals			20	4	24

Last updated: 8 December 2024.
