= Riccardo Fogliata =

Italian footballer (born 2004)

Personal information
- Date of birth: 20 May 2004 (age 22)
- Place of birth: Castrezzato, Italy
- Height: 1.83 m (6 ft 0 in)
- Position: Midfielder

Team information
- Current team: Campobasso (on loan from Union Brescia)
- Number: 21

Youth career
- –2023: Brescia

Senior career*
Years	Team	Apps	(Gls)
2023–2025	Brescia	19	(1)
2025–	Union Brescia	26	(1)
2026–	→ Campobasso (loan)	1	(0)
- * Club domestic league appearances and goals as of 23 August 2026

Riccardo Fogliata (born 20 May 2004) is an Italian professional footballer who plays as a midfielder for Serie C Group B club Campobasso on loan from Union Brescia.

== Club career ==
Born in Castrezzato, a town in the Province of Brescia, Fogliata grew up in Brescia Calcio Youth Sector. After his debut during the previous season, in the 2022-2023 season he became the captain of Brescia's Primavera when he was 18, scoring 6 goals and serving 1 assist in 27 appearances during that season.

After being promoted to Brescia's first team in the same summer, under head coach Daniele Gastaldello, he made his professional debut on 3 September 2023 against Cosenza (1-0), playing as a starter in the first game of Brescia's season, serving the assist for the winning goal of Birkir Bjarnason in the 53rd minute. After playing most of the games during the first months, with the new coach Rolando Maran he started playing less, finishing his first professional season with 13 appearances and 1 assist. Meanwhile, in December 2023, together with his peer Matteo Ferro, he signed his first professional contract for Brescia, signing with Rondinelle until 2028.

During the next season, after some benches during the first matches, he returned to play often and on 19 October 2024 he scored his first professional goal against Sassuolo (2-5), scoring the momentary 1-1.

== Career statistics ==
As of match played 3 November 2024

Appearances and goals by club, season and competition
Club	Season	League			Coppa Italia		Total	
Club	Season	Division	Apps	Goals	Apps	Goals	Apps	Goals
Brescia	2023–24	Serie B	13	0	-	-	13	0
Brescia	2024–25	Serie B	6	1	1	0	7	1
Career total			19	1	1	0	20	1
