= Mehdi Léris =

Algerian footballer (born 1998)

Personal information
- Full name: Mehdi Pascal Marcel Léris
- Date of birth: 23 May 1998 (age 28)
- Place of birth: Mont-de-Marsan, France
- Height: 1.86 m (6 ft 1 in)
- Positions: Right winger; right wing-back

Team information
- Current team: Pisa
- Number: 7

Youth career
- Stade Montois
- 2013–2016: Chievo
- 2016–2017: → Juventus (loan)

Senior career*
| Years | Team | Apps | (Gls) |
| 2017–2019 | Chievo | 27 | (0) |
| 2019–2023 | Sampdoria | 67 | (2) |
| 2021–2022 | → Brescia (loan) | 33 | (2) |
| 2023–2024 | Stoke City | 30 | (2) |
| 2024– | Pisa | 37 | (2) |

International career^{‡}
| 2022– | Algeria | 4 | (0) |
- * Club domestic league appearances and goals as of 25 May 2026 ‡ National team caps and goals as of 20 June 2023

Mehdi Pascal Marcel Léris (Arabic: مهدي باسكال مارسيل ليريس; born 23 May 1998) is a professional footballer who plays as a right winger or right wing-back for Serie B club Pisa. Born in France, he represents the Algeria national team.

Léris began his career with French club Stade Montois before joining Serie A side Chievo in 2013. After a brief loan spell with Juventus' youth team, he made his Serie A debut for Chievo in 2017. In August 2019 he joined Sampdoria for a fee of €2.5 million. He spent five years at the Stadio Luigi Ferraris, spending the 2021–22 season with Brescia. In the summer of 2023, he moved to EFL Championship side Stoke City.

== Club career ==
=== Chievo ===
Léris caught the eye of Italian club Chievo in an amateur showcase tournament in Paris in 2013 whilst playing for his home town club Stade Montois, and thereafter joined the youth academy of the team. Léris moved on loan to Juventus with an option to buy for a year, becoming a part of the youth squad without making an appearance for the senior team. Léris returned to Chievo, and made his professional debut with them in a 3–0 Serie A loss to Juventus on 9 September 2017. After making four appearances in 2017–18, he played 24 times in 2018–19 as Chievo suffered financial difficulties and were relegated to Serie B. He scored his first senior goal on 5 December 2018 in a 2–1 defeat against Cagliari in the Coppa Italia.

=== Sampdoria ===
On 12 August 2019, Léris signed a five-year deal with Sampdoria for a fee of around €2.5 million. He made 16 appearances in 2019–20, scoring once in a 1–1 draw with Brescia in the final match of the campaign. In 2020–21, Léris made 22 appearances as Sampdoria finished in ninth place. On 18 August 2021, he joined Serie B side Brescia on loan for the 2021–22 season. He was a regular in the side helping them reach the semi-finals of the play-offs where they were defeated by AC Monza. He returned to Sampdoria for the 2022–23 season, playing 35 times as the Stadio Luigi Ferraris side endured a terrible campaign winning only three matches and were relegated to Serie B.

=== Stoke City ===
On 22 August 2023, Léris joined EFL Championship club Stoke City on a three-year contract for an undisclosed fee. He scored on his full debut for Stoke on 29 August 2023 in a 6–1 win against Rotherham United in the EFL Cup. His first goal in the Championship came on 30 September 2023 in a 3–2 win against Bristol City. In the 2023–24 season, Léris made 33 appearances of which 18 were starts as Stoke successfully avoided relegation, finishing in 17th position.

=== Pisa ===
Léris left Stoke on 13 August 2024, to join Serie B club Pisa, with a lack of game time being cited as a factor in his desire to seek a return to Italian football.

== International career ==
Léris was called up to the Algeria national team for a set of friendlies in November 2022. He debuted with them in a 1–1 friendly tie with Mali on 16 November 2022.

== Personal life ==
Léris was born in Mont-de-Marsan, France to a French father of Spanish descent and an Algerian mother. Léris' father, Yannick, is a former amateur footballer and a U16 football coach in France.

== Career statistics ==
=== Club ===
As of match played 1 May 2026

Appearances and goals by club, season and competition
| Club | Season | League | | | National Cup (Note: Includes Coppa Italia and FA Cup) | | League Cup (Note: Includes EFL Cup) | | Other | | Total | |
| Club | Season | League | Apps | Goals | Apps | Goals | Apps | Goals | Apps | Goals | Apps | Goals |
|---|---|---|---|---|---|---|---|---|---|---|---|---|
| Chievo | 2017–18 | Serie A | 4 | 0 | 0 | 0 | — | | — | | 4 | 0 |
| Chievo | 2018–19 | Serie A | 23 | 0 | 1 | 1 | — | | — | | 24 | 1 |
| Chievo | Total | | 27 | 0 | 1 | 1 | — | | — | | 28 | 1 |
| Sampdoria | 2019–20 | Serie A | 15 | 1 | 1 | 0 | — | | — | | 16 | 1 |
| Sampdoria | 2020–21 | Serie A | 20 | 0 | 2 | 0 | — | | — | | 22 | 0 |
| Sampdoria | 2021–22 | Serie A | 0 | 0 | 0 | 0 | — | | — | | 0 | 0 |
| Sampdoria | 2022–23 | Serie A | 32 | 1 | 3 | 0 | — | | — | | 35 | 1 |
| Sampdoria | 2023–24 | Serie B | 0 | 0 | 1 | 1 | — | | — | | 1 | 1 |
| Sampdoria | Total | | 67 | 2 | 7 | 1 | — | | — | | 74 | 3 |
| Brescia (loan) | 2021–22 | Serie B | 33 | 2 | 0 | 0 | — | | 3 (Note: Appearances in Serie B promotion play-offs) | 0 | 36 | 2 |
| Stoke City | 2023–24 | EFL Championship | 30 | 2 | 1 | 0 | 2 | 1 | — | | 33 | 3 |
| Pisa | 2024–25 | Serie B | 3 | 0 | 0 | 0 | — | | — | | 3 | 0 |
| Pisa | 2025–26 | Serie A | 31 | 2 | 1 | 0 | — | | — | | 32 | 2 |
| Pisa | Total | | 34 | 2 | 1 | 0 | — | | — | | 35 | 2 |
| Career total | | | 191 | 8 | 10 | 2 | 2 | 1 | 3 | 0 | 207 | 11 |

=== International ===
As of match played 20 June 2023

Appearances and goals by national team and year
| National team | Year | Apps | Goals |
|---|---|---|---|
| Algeria | 2022 | 2 | 0 |
| Algeria | 2023 | 2 | 0 |
| Total | | 4 | 0 |
