= Andrea Papetti =

Italian footballer (born 2002)

Personal information
- Date of birth: 3 July 2002 (age 24)
- Place of birth: Cernusco sul Naviglio, Italy
- Height: 1.91 m (6 ft 3 in)
- Position: Centre back

Team information
- Current team: Vicenza
- Number: 66

Youth career
- 2016–2020: Brescia

Senior career*
| Years | Team | Apps | (Gls) |
| 2020–2025 | Brescia | 92 | (2) |
| 2025–2026 | Reggiana | 36 | (0) |
| 2026– | Vicenza | 1 | (0) |

International career^{‡}
| 2021–2022 | Italy U20 | 3 | (0) |
- * Club domestic league appearances and goals as of 20 September 2026 ‡ National team caps and goals as of 7 June 2022

Andrea Papetti (born 3 July 2002) is an Italian professional footballer who plays as a centre back for Serie B club Vicenza.

== Club career ==
Papetti is an exponent from Brescia youth academy.

He made his Serie A debut aged 18, on 9 March 2020. He played 90 minutes for Brescia as a center back against Sassuolo.

On 9 July 2025, Papetti signed a two-season contract with Reggiana.

== Career statistics ==
=== Club ===
As of match played 16 December 2023

Appearances and goals by club, season and competition
| Club | Season | League | | | National Cup | | Continental | | Other | | Total | |
| Club | Season | Division | Apps | Goals | Apps | Goals | Apps | Goals | Apps | Goals | Apps | Goals |
|---|---|---|---|---|---|---|---|---|---|---|---|---|
| Brescia | 2019–20 | Serie A | 11 | 1 | 0 | 0 | — | | — | | 11 | 1 |
| Brescia | 2020–21 | Serie B | 17 | 1 | 0 | 0 | — | | — | | 17 | 1 |
| Brescia | 2021–22 | Serie B | 5 | 0 | 0 | 0 | — | | — | | 5 | 0 |
| Brescia | 2022–23 | Serie B | 20 | 0 | 0 | 0 | — | | — | | 20 | 0 |
| Brescia | 2023–24 | Serie B | 16 | 0 | 0 | 0 | — | | — | | 16 | 0 |
| Career total | | | 69 | 2 | 0 | 0 | 0 | 0 | 0 | 0 | 69 | 2 |
