= Flavio Bianchi =

Italian footballer (born 2000)

Personal information
- Full name: Flavio Junior Bianchi
- Date of birth: 24 January 2000 (age 26)
- Place of birth: Asti, Italy
- Height: 1.78 m (5 ft 10 in)
- Position: Forward

Team information
- Current team: Bari

Youth career
- –2020: Genoa
- 2017–2018: → Torino (loan)

Senior career*
Years	Team	Apps	(Gls)
2020–2022	Genoa	7	(1)
2020–2021	→ Lucchese (loan)	32	(13)
2022	→ Brescia (loan)	8	(1)
2022–2025	Brescia	95	(12)
2025–2026	Empoli	8	(0)
2026–	Bari	0	(0)

International career^{‡}
2015	Italy U15	7	(1)
2015	Italy U16	2	(1)
2017	Italy U17	1	(0)
2017	Italy U18	2	(0)
- * Club domestic league appearances and goals as of 30 August 2026 ‡ National team caps and goals as of 13 December 2017

Flavio Junior Bianchi (born 24 January 2000) is an Italian professional footballer who plays as a forward for Serie C Group C club Bari.

== Club career ==
He made his debut for the senior squad of Genoa on 13 August 2021 in a Coppa Italia game against Perugia. He made his Serie A debut for Genoa on 21 August 2021 in a game against Inter Milan. He substituted Hernani at half-time of a 0–4 away loss. He made his first start on 2 October 2021 against Salernitana. On 5 November 2021, he scored his first Serie A goal in Empoli-Genoa 2-2 at the 89'.

On 28 January 2022, he joined Serie B club Brescia on loan.

On 18 September 2025, Bianchi signed with Empoli.

== International career ==
He was first called up to represent Italy in 2015 for under-15 friendlies.

He was on the Italy's squad at the 2017 UEFA European Under-17 Championship and made one appearance, Italy did not advance from the group stage.

== Personal life ==
Born in Asti, he grew up in Diano Marina.

== Career statistics ==
=== Club ===
As of match played 23 August 2024

Appearances and goals by club, season and competition
Club	Season	League			National Cup (Note: Includes Coppa Italia)		Europe		Other		Total	
Club	Season	Division	Apps	Goals	Apps	Goals	Apps	Goals	Apps	Goals	Apps	Goals
Lucchese (loan)	2020–21	Serie C	32	13	0	0	—		—		32	13
Genoa	2021–22	Serie A	7	1	1	0	—		—		8	1
Brescia (loan)	2021–22	Serie B	8	1	0	0	—		3 (Note: Appearance(s) in Serie B play-off)	1	11	2
Brescia	2022–23	Serie B	34	4	2	1	—		2 (Note: Appearance(s) in Serie B play-out)	0	38	5
Brescia	2023–24	Serie B	38	4	0	0	—		1	0	39	4
Brescia	Total		80	9	2	1	—		6	1	88	11
Career total			128	23	3	1	—		6	1	137	25
