= Fran Karačić =

Australian soccer player

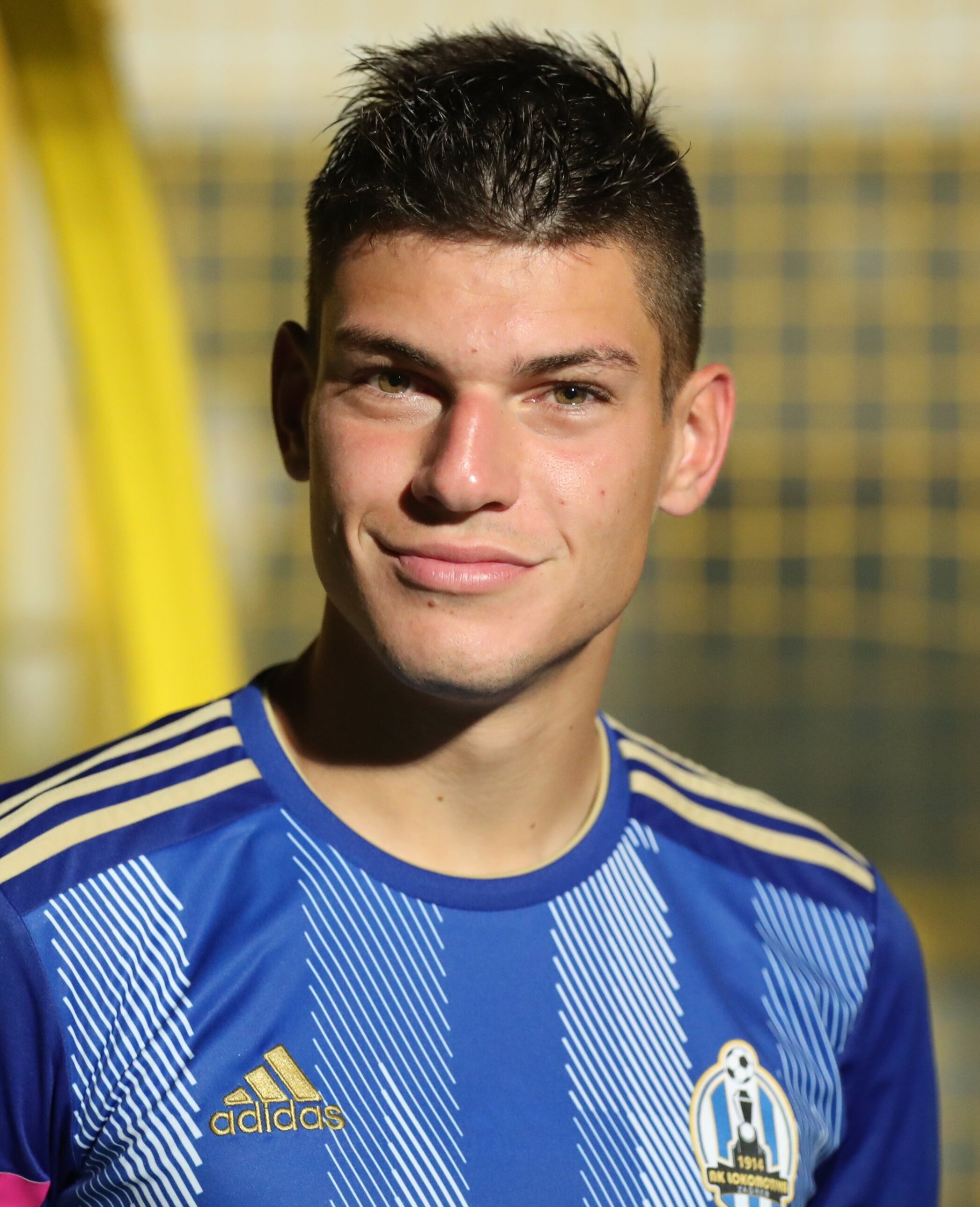
- Karačić with NK Lokomotiva in 2018

Personal information
- Full name: Fran Karačić
- Date of birth: 12 May 1996 (age 30)
- Place of birth: Zagreb, Croatia
- Height: 1.81 m (5 ft 11 in)
- Position: Right back

Team information
- Current team: Hajduk Split
- Number: 29

Youth career
- Kustošija
- –2012: NK Zagreb
- 2012–2016: Lokomotiva

Senior career*
Years	Team	Apps	(Gls)
2015–2020	Lokomotiva	103	(7)
2015	→ Lučko (loan)	8	(0)
2020–2021	Dinamo Zagreb	0	(0)
2020–2021	→ Lokomotiva (loan)	26	(1)
2021–2023	Brescia	54	(0)
2024	Rudeš	9	(1)
2024–2025	Lokomotiva	34	(4)
2025–	Hajduk Split	11	(1)
2026	→ Osijek (loan)	11	(0)

International career^{‡}
2017	Croatia U21	7	(2)
2021–	Australia	15	(1)
- * Club domestic league appearances and goals as of 15 June 2026 ‡ National team caps and goals as of 25 March 2025

Fran Karačić (Croatian pronunciation: [frâŋ kâratʃitɕ]; (Note: In isolation, Fran is pronounced [frân].) born 12 May 1996) is a professional soccer player who plays as a right back for Croatian Football League club Hajduk Split. Born in Croatia, he plays for the Australia national team.

== Club career ==
On 14 January 2021, Karačić joined Serie B side Brescia on a two-and-a-half-year deal.

After departing Brescia at the end of the 2022–23 season which ended with relegation to Serie C, Karačić spent the rest of 2023 without a club before signing with Rudeš on 31 January 2024.

Karačić would leave Rudeš at the end of the 2023–24 season to rejoin his first professional club Lokomotiva, eventually becoming captain of the side after six months.

On 8 July 2025, Karačić joined Hajduk Split until the end of the 2027–28 season.

In January 2026, Karačić moved on loan from Hajduk Split to Osijek until the end of the 2025–26 season, with an option to make the transfer permanent.

== International career ==
Karacic was eligible to represent Croatia or Australia due to his father being born in Sydney.

In May 2018, Karačić was named in Australia's preliminary 26-man squad for the 2018 FIFA World Cup in Russia. On 25 May 2018, he was officially cleared by FIFA to represent Australia. Karačić was later cut from the final squad.

Karačić was called up to the Australian squad again for a series of 2022 FIFA World Cup qualifying games in June 2021, where he made his international debut against Kuwait.

He was named in Australia's squad for the 2022 FIFA World Cup in November 2022, making two appearances against Tunisia and eventual champions Argentina as Australia were knocked out by the latter.

Karačić would not be called up to the national team after the World Cup for the next two and a half years owing to his club situation before being called up in March 2025 for Australia's crucial World Cup qualifiers against Indonesia and China, where he came off the bench in both games as Australia took big steps towards qualification by winning both games.

== Career statistics ==
=== Club ===
As of match played 21 December 2024

Appearances and goals by club, season and competition
Club	Season	League			National cup (Note: Includes Croatian Cup, Coppa Italia)		Continental		Other		Total	
Club	Season	Division	Apps	Goals	Apps	Goals	Apps	Goals	Apps	Goals	Apps	Goals
Lokomotiva	2014–15	1. HNL	0	0	0	0	—		—		0	0
Lokomotiva	2015–16	1. HNL	10	0	0	0	0	0	—		10	0
Lokomotiva	2016–17	1. HNL	19	3	1	0	1 (Note: Appearance in UEFA Europa League)	0	—		21	3
Lokomotiva	2017–18	1. HNL	26	1	3	0	—		—		29	1
Lokomotiva	2018–19	1. HNL	32	1	2	0	—		—		34	1
Lokomotiva	2019–20	1 HNL	30	2	3	1	—		—		33	3
Lokomotiva	Total		117	7	9	1	1	0	0	0	127	8
Lučko (loan)	2014–15	2. HNL	8	0	0	0	—		—		8	0
Dinamo Zagreb	2020–21	1. HNL	0	0	0	0	0	0	—		0	0
Lokomotiva (loan)	2020–21	1. HNL	12	1	2	0	2 (Note: One appearance in UEFA Champions League, one appearance in UEFA Europa League)	0	—		16	1
Brescia	2020–21	Serie B	15	0	0	0	—		1 (Note: Appearance in Serie B promotion play-offs)	0	16	0
Brescia	2021–22	Serie B	17	0	0	0	—		1	0	18	0
Brescia	2022–23	Serie B	22	0	1	0	—		2 (Note: Appearances in Serie B relegation play-out)	0	25	0
Brescia	Total		54	0	1	0	0	0	4	0	59	0
Rudeš	2023–24	HNL	9	1	1	0	—		—		10	1
Lokomotiva	2024–25	HNL	18	2	1	0	—		—		19	2
Career total			218	11	14	1	3	0	4	0	239	12

=== International ===
As of match played 25 March 2025

Appearances and goals by national team and year
National team	Year	Apps	Goals
Australia	2021	6	1
Australia	2022	7	0
Australia	2023	0	0
Australia	2024	0	0
Australia	2025	2	0
Total		15	1

Scores and results list Australia's goal tally first, score column indicates score after each Karačić goal.

List of international goals scored by Fran Karačić
No.	Date	Venue	Opponent	Score	Result	Competition	Ref.
1	11 June 2021	Jaber Al-Ahmad International Stadium, Kuwait City, Kuwait	Nepal	2–0	3–0	2022 FIFA World Cup qualification	
