= Lorenzo Andreoli =

Italian footballer

Personal information
- Date of birth: 15 January 2001 (age 25)
- Place of birth: Brescia, Italy
- Height: 1.82 m (6 ft 0 in)
- Position: Defensive midfielder

Team information
- Current team: Varesina
- Number: 8

Youth career
- Brescia

Senior career*
Years	Team	Apps	(Gls)
2019–2022	Brescia	3	(0)
2019–2020	→ Franciacorta (loan)	23	(1)
2020–2021	→ Pergolettese (loan)	24	(2)
2022–2024	Pergolettese	49	(2)
2024–2025	Altamura	16	(0)
2025–	Varesina	6	(1)
- * Club domestic league appearances and goals as of 10 November 2025

Lorenzo Andreoli (born 15 January 2001) is an Italian football player who plays for Varesina.

== Club career ==
He was raised in the youth system of Brescia. He began his senior career in the 2019–20 season in Serie D on loan to Franciacorta.

For the 2020–21 season, he was loaned to Pergolettese. He made his professional debut in Serie C for Pergolettese on 27 September 2020 against Lucchese. He finished the season with 24 league appearances, 12 as a starter.

He made his Serie B debut for Brescia on 19 December 2021 in a game against Cittadella. He made his first appearance as a starter on 22 January 2022 against Ternana.

On 11 August 2022, Andreoli returned to Pergolettese on a permanent basis.
