= Vincenzo Garofalo =

Italian footballer

Personal information
- Date of birth: 8 August 1999 (age 27)
- Place of birth: Lioni, Italy
- Height: 1.84 m (6 ft 0 in)
- Position: Midfielder

Youth career
- –2016: Spezia
- 2016–2017: Salernitana
- 2017: Modena

Senior career*
Years	Team	Apps	(Gls)
2018	Pisa	0	(0)
2018	→ Potenza (loan)	1	(0)
2018	Pro Piacenza	0	(0)
2019	Salernitana	0	(0)
2019	→ Rieti (loan)	17	(0)
2019–2020	Sambenedettese	1	(0)
2020	Avellino	5	(1)
2020–2022	Foggia	57	(6)
2022–2024	Brescia	3	(0)
2023	→ Trento (loan)	12	(1)
2024	Virtus Francavilla	14	(0)
2024–2025	Messina	36	(2)
2025–2026	Foggia	37	(2)
- * Club domestic league appearances and goals as of 1 May 2026

Vincenzo Garofalo (born 8 August 1999) is an Italian professional footballer who plays as a midfielder.

== Career ==
On 3 October 2020, Garofalo joined Foggia.

On 1 July 2022, he joined Brescia. That was his first season in Serie B where he made three late substitute appearances. On 31 January 2023, Garofalo was loaned to Trento.

On 16 January 2024, Garofalo signed with Virtus Francavilla.

Dal 1 Luglio 2026 è svincolato.

== Club statistics ==
As of match played 12 May 2022

Club	Season	League			National Cup		League Cup		Other		Total	
Club	Season	Division	Apps	Goals	Apps	Goals	Apps	Goals	Apps	Goals	Apps	Goals
Pisa	2017–18	Serie C	0	0	0	0	0	0	–		0	0
Potenza (loan)	2017–18	Serie D	1	0	0	0	0	0	–		1	0
Pro Piacenza	2018–19	Serie C	0	0	0	0	0	0	–		0	0
Salernitana	2018–19	Serie B	0	0	0	0	–		–		0	0
Rieti (loan)	2018–19	Serie C	17	0	0	0	0	0	–		17	0
Sambenedettese	2019–20	Serie C	1	0	0	0	1 (Note: Appearance(s) in Coppa Italia Serie C)	0	–		2	0
Avellino	2019–20	Serie C	4	1	0	0	0	0	1 (Note: Appearance(s) in Promotion play-offs)	0	5	1
Foggia	2020–21	Serie C	30	1	0	0	–		2	0	32	1
Foggia	2021–22	Serie C	27	5	0	0	–		4	0	31	5
Foggia	Total		57	6	0	0	0	0	6	0	63	6
Career total			80	7	0	0	1	0	7	0	88	7
