= Michele Besaggio =

Italian footballer (born 2002)

Personal information
- Date of birth: 28 April 2002 (age 24)
- Place of birth: Italy
- Height: 1.81 m (5 ft 11 in)
- Position: Midfielder

Team information
- Current team: Avellino
- Number: 39

Youth career
- 2006–: Merlara
- –2016: Urbana
- 2016–2018: Vicenza
- 2018–2022: Genoa

Senior career*
Years	Team	Apps	(Gls)
2022–2023	Genoa	0	(0)
2022–2023	→ Juventus Next Gen (loan)	34	(2)
2023–2025	Brescia	59	(2)
2025–	Avellino	36	(3)
- * Club domestic league appearances and goals as of 10 May 2026

Michele Besaggio (born 28 April 2002) is an Italian professional footballer who plays as a midfielder for Serie B club Avellino.

== Career ==
=== Youth career ===
Besaggio started playing football in 2006, aged four, when he joined a local grassroots club in Merlara. He then played for Urbana, before entering Vicenza's youth sector at the age of 14. He spent two years with the Biancorossi, before being released and subsequently signed by Genoa in August 2018.

Having impressed in his performances for the under-17 team in his first months at the club, Besaggio was then promoted to the under-19 side, as he featured for them in the Torneo di Viareggio in March 2019. The midfielder spent three more seasons with Genoa's Primavera team (which he also captained), without making a single official appearance for the senior squad.

=== Juventus Next Gen ===
On 25 August 2022, Besaggio joined Serie A club Juventus on a year-long loan, with an option to make the deal permanent, and was promptly assigned to their reserve team.

On 3 September, he made his professional debut, coming on as a substitute for Samuel Iling-Junior in the Serie C match against Trento, which ended in a 2–0 win for his side. He then scored his first professional goal on 2 October, netting a penalty kick in the 1–1 league draw against Pergolettese.

=== Brescia ===
On 29 August 2023, Besaggio signed with Brescia.

=== Avellino ===
On 18 July 2025, Besaggio joined Avellino on a three-year contract.

== Style of play ==
Besaggio has been described as a well-rounded, right-footed midfielder, who can either play as a number 10 or a mezzala. He has been mainly regarded for his technical abilities, his strength, his work rate and his leadership skills.

He has cited Alessandro Del Piero, Philippe Coutinho and Goran Pandev as his biggest sources of inspiration.

== Personal life ==
Besaggio is a self-declared supporter of Juventus.

== Career statistics ==
As of match played 22 April 2023

Appearances and goals by club, season and competition
Club	Season	League			Coppa Italia		Other		Total	
Club	Season	Division	Apps	Goals	Apps	Goals	Apps	Goals	Apps	Goals
Juventus Next Gen	2022–23	Serie C	34	2	0	0	6 (Note: Appearances in Coppa Italia Serie C)	0	40	2
Career total			34	2	0	3	6	0	40	2
