= Birkir Bjarnason =

Icelandic footballer (born 1988)

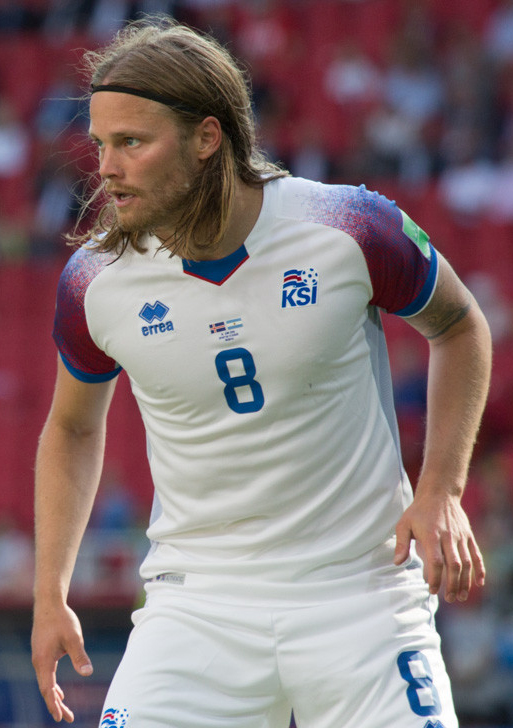
- Birkir playing for Iceland at the 2018 FIFA World Cup

Personal information
- Full name: Birkir Bjarnason
- Date of birth: 27 May 1988 (age 38)
- Place of birth: Akureyri, Iceland
- Height: 1.83 m (6 ft 0 in)
- Position: Central midfielder

Youth career
- KA Akureyri
- Austrått
- Figgjo

Senior career*
Years	Team	Apps	(Gls)
2006–2011	Viking	103	(16)
2008	→ Bodø/Glimt (loan)	22	(5)
2012–2013	Standard Liège	16	(0)
2012–2013	→ Pescara (loan)	24	(2)
2013	Pescara	1	(0)
2013–2014	Sampdoria	14	(0)
2014–2015	Pescara	35	(10)
2015–2017	FC Basel	42	(14)
2017–2019	Aston Villa	48	(5)
2019	Al-Arabi	5	(1)
2020–2021	Brescia	39	(6)
2021–2023	Adana Demirspor	41	(5)
2023	Viking	11	(2)
2023–2025	Brescia	64	(9)
Total		465	(75)

International career
2004	Iceland U17	7	(2)
2005–2007	Iceland U19	14	(3)
2006–2011	Iceland U21	25	(4)
2010–2022	Iceland	113	(15)
- * Club domestic league appearances and goals

Birkir Bjarnason (born 27 May 1988) is an Icelandic former professional footballer who played as a central midfielder. He is, alongside Aron Gunnarsson, the joint most capped player of the Iceland national team.

== Club career ==
=== Viking ===
Birkir started playing football with local clubs in his hometown of Akureyri. His family moved to Norway in 1999 and he joined the youth teams of Figgjo. In the summer of 2005 Birkir joined Viking. In the 2006 season he scored his first goal for Viking against Hamarkameratene. Following that he played consistently as a starter for Viking and was a key aspect in helping the club avoid relegation that year and helping them obtain a third-place finish in 2007 under trainer Uwe Rösler.

In 2008 Birkir had a successful loan spell at newly promoted Tippeligaen side Bodø/Glimt, playing a big part in them finishing fourth in the league. His performances brought the attention of bigger clubs such as Serie A club Reggina during January 2008, but he stayed at Viking until 2012. During this time he made 100 appearances for Viking in the Tippeligaen, scoring 16 league goals.

=== Standard Liège ===
On 12 January 2012, it was announced that Birkir would sign for Belgian Pro League side Standard Liège on a five-year deal. He played 16 league matches in the Belgium Pro League for Standard.

=== Pescara ===
After the end of the 2011–12 season, in July 2012, Birkir joined the newly promoted Serie A side Pescara on a season-long loan deal, for €300,000, with an option to sign for an additional €900,000. He scored his first goal for Pescara in a 5–1 away defeat at Napoli. After the 2012–13 season he stated that he was not interested in going down to Serie B with Pescara and, with two years remaining of his Standard Liège contract, he was unsure where he would be playing in the 2013–14 season.

Pescara bought Birkir from Standard Liège on 9 June 2013 on a permanent transfer for a previously agreed fee, with the aim of selling him for a higher amount that summer with interest being reported from clubs in the top leagues in England including, Italy and Germany.

=== Sampdoria ===
On 2 September 2013, it was confirmed that Serie A side Sampdoria had signed Birkir on a co-ownership deal. In total he made 14 Serie A appearances during the 2013–14 season for Sampdoria.

=== Return to Pescara ===
On 20 June 2014, it was announced that Birkir would sign again for Pescara on 1 July 2014, after the club won the co-ownership bidding for the player from Sampdoria. Upon signing, he was appointed the captain for the 2014–15 season.

He scored 12 goals in 38 Serie B matches to help guide Pescara to a seventh-place finish and qualifying for the Serie B playoffs. Pescara beat Perugia 2–1 to qualify for the playoff semi-final. They beat Vicenza Calcio 3–2 over two legs in the semi-finals, with Birkir scoring the crucial match winning aggregate goal for Pescara on 2 June 2015 to help them qualify for the Serie B playoff final against Bologna. However, with a 1–1 aggregate score after two legs Bologna, being the highest-placed team, were promoted.

On 27 June 2015, Pescara announced they had accepted an offer of €1 million for Birkir from Serie A side Torino. It was later revealed in July, that the move had seemingly stalled as Birkir had been unable to agree personal terms with the club. A move to English side Leeds United also fell through.

=== Basel ===
On 7 July 2015, it was announced that Bjarnason had signed a contract with Swiss Super League club FC Basel for €1 million. On 9 July Basel confirmed the transfer, stating that he had signed a three-year contract with them. He joined Basel's first team for their 2015–16 season under head coach Urs Fischer. After playing in one test game Bjarnason played his domestic league debut for his new club in the away game in the Letzigrund on 25 July as Basel won 3–2 against Grasshopper Club. In the Champions League third qualifying round on 5 August he scored his first goal for his new club during the 1–0 home win against Lech Poznań. It was the only goal of the game, in the first minute of overtime, and Basel qualified for the play-off round. He scored his first league goal for Basel on 26 September during the 3–1 home win against Lugano. Under manager Urs Fischer Bjarnason won the Swiss Super League championship at the end of the 2015–16 Super League season. For the club it was the seventh title in a row and their 19th championship title in total.

Bjarnason was also a regular starter for the team in Basel's 2016–17 season, frequently showing good performances in all competitions. EFL Championship team Aston Villa, following their relegation in the preceding Premier League season, showed interest and on 25 January 2017 Basel announced that the club had signed the player. During his time with the club, Bjarnason played a total of 72 games for Basel scoring a total of 17 goals. 42 of these games were in the Swiss Super League, three in the Swiss Cup, 19 in the UEFA competitions (Champions League and Europa League) and eight were friendly games. He scored 14 goals in the domestic league and the other three were scored during European games.

=== Aston Villa ===
On 25 January 2017, Birkir signed a three-and-a-half-year contract with English Championship side Aston Villa. He scored his first goal for Aston Villa in an EFL Cup tie against Wigan Athletic on 22 August 2017.

=== Brescia ===
On 18 January 2020, Birkir returned to Italy, after signing a 1.5-year contract with Serie A side Brescia, after a short spell in Qatar playing for Al-Arabi.

=== Adana Demirspor ===
On 13 August 2021 Birkir joined Turkish Süper Lig club, newly promoted, Adana Demirspor. He scored his first goal in the Süper Lig against Çaykur Rizespor on 18 September 2021.

=== Return to Viking ===
On 31 March 2023, Birkir returned to his former club Viking on a one-year contract.

=== Return to Brescia ===
On 9 August 2023 Birkir returned to his former club Brescia, leaving his first senior club Viking for the second time, as they held second place in the Norwegian Eliteserien after a record streak of eight wins in a row, and 13 games left to play.

Birkir departed the club following the 2024–25 season. Later, on 1 September 2025, he announced his retirement from football.

== International career ==
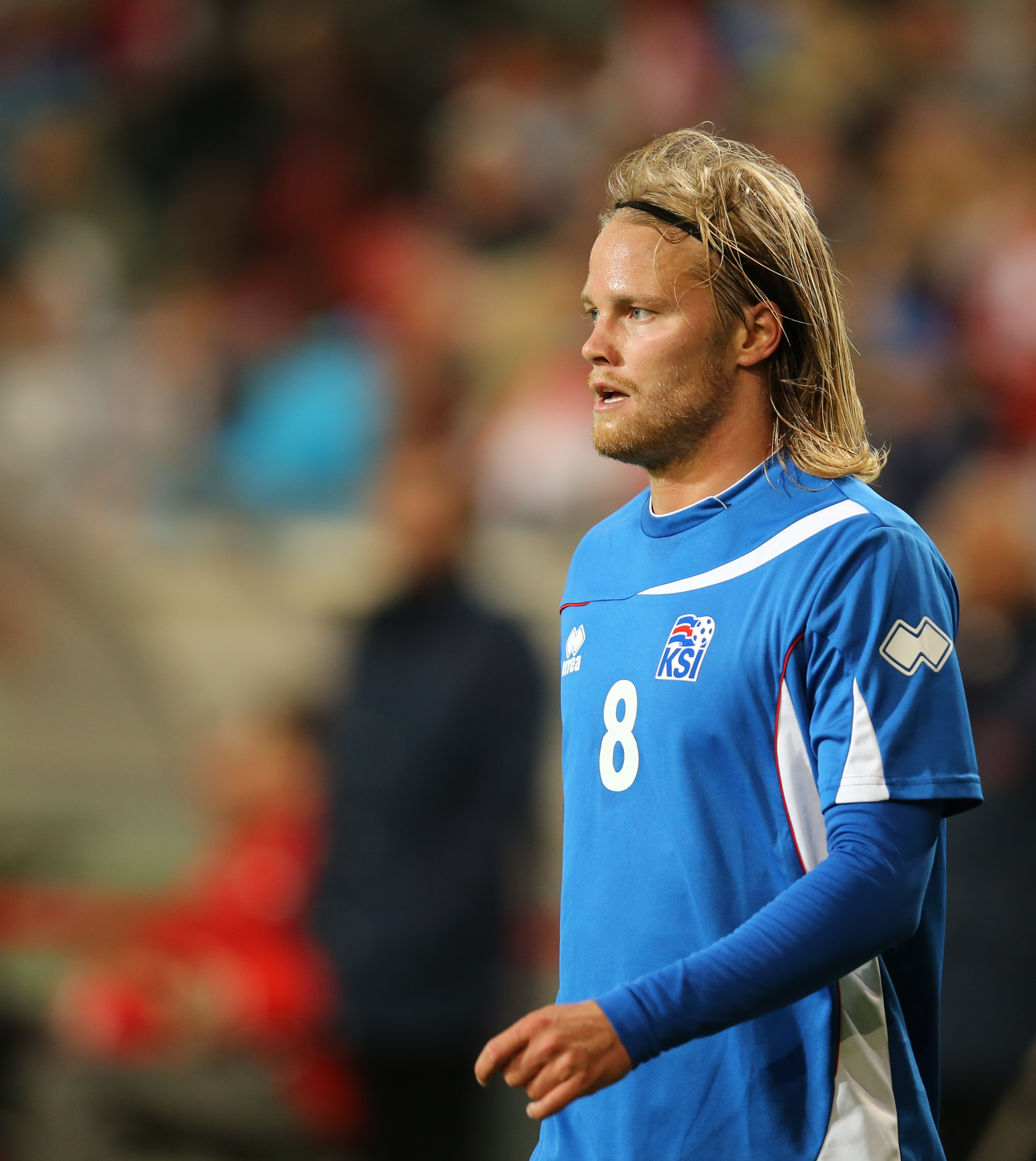
Birkir with Iceland in 2014

Birkir made his debut for the senior Iceland national team in 2010. He holds the all-time appearance record for the senior side, which stands at 113 caps. He has also represented them at Iceland U-21, Under 19 and Under 17 levels.

He scored his first goal for Iceland against France on 27 May 2012 in a 3–2 defeat. He also followed this up with goals for Iceland in 2014 FIFA World Cup qualification with goals against Albania on 12 October 2012, Slovenia on 7 June 2013 and then against Albania again on 10 September 2013 in a 2–1 victory. Birkir's goals and performances played a crucial role in the qualifiers helping guide Iceland to the World Cup playoffs, however in November 2013 they lost 2–0 on aggregate over two legs to Croatia.

He was called up to the national team again for UEFA Euro 2016 and achieved the honor of getting his country's first ever goal in a major tournament when he scored the equalizer against Portugal in their first group match.

On 27 June 2016, Birkir played against England in the UEFA Euro 2016 round of 16 at the Stade de Nice, as Iceland upset England with a 2–1 victory to advance to the quarter-finals.

In May 2018 he was named in Iceland's 23-man squad for the 2018 World Cup in Russia.

== Career statistics ==
=== Club ===
Appearances and goals by club, season and competition
Club	Season	League			National cup		League cup		Other		Total	
Club	Season	Division	Apps	Goals	Apps	Goals	Apps	Goals	Apps	Goals	Apps	Goals
Viking	2005	Eliteserien	0	0	0	0	—		1 (Note: Appearance in UEFA Cup)	0	1	0
Viking	2006	Eliteserien	16	1	4	0	—		—		20	1
Viking	2007	Eliteserien	6	0	1	0	—		—		7	0
Viking	2008	Eliteserien	0	0	0	0	—		—		0	0
Viking	2009	Eliteserien	30	7	3	0	—		—		33	7
Viking	2010	Eliteserien	26	8	5	2	—		—		31	10
Viking	2011	Eliteserien	25	0	5	1	—		—		30	1
Viking	Total		103	16	18	3	—		1	0	122	19
Bodø/Glimt (loan)	2008	Eliteserien	22	5	0	0	—		—		22	5
Standard Liège	2011–12	Belgian Pro League	16	0	1	0	—		3 (Note: Appearance(s) in UEFA Europa League)	0	20	0
Pescara (loan)	2012–13	Serie A	24	2	1	0	—		—		25	2
Pescara	2013–14	Serie B	1	0	2	0	—		—		3	0
Pescara	Total		25	2	3	0	—		—		28	2
Sampdoria	2013–14	Serie A	14	0	2	1	—		—		16	1
Pescara	2014–15	Serie B	35	10	3	0	—		4 (Note: Appearance(s) in Serie B promotion play-offs)	2	42	12
Basel	2015–16	Swiss Super League	29	10	1	0	—		10	2	40	12
Basel	2016–17	Swiss Super League	13	4	1	0	—		5 (Note: Appearance(s) in UEFA Champions League)	0	19	4
Basel	Total		42	14	2	0	—		15	2	59	16
Aston Villa	2016–17	Championship	8	0	0	0	0	0	—		8	0
Aston Villa	2017–18	Championship	23	3	1	0	3	1	2 (Note: Appearance(s) in Championship play-offs)	0	29	4
Aston Villa	2018–19	Championship	17	2	0	0	0	0	—		17	2
Aston Villa	Total		48	5	1	0	3	1	2	0	54	6
Al-Arabi	2019–20	Qatar Stars League	5	1	3	0	0	0	—		8	1
Brescia	2019–20	Serie A	13	0	0	0	—		—		13	0
Brescia	2020–21	Serie B	26	6	0	0	—		1	0	27	6
Brescia	Total		39	6	0	0	—		1	0	40	6
Adana Demirspor	2021–22	Süper Lig	32	5	1	2	—		—		33	7
Adana Demirspor	2022–23	Süper Lig	9	0	3	0	—		—		12	0
Adana Demirspor	Total		41	5	4	2	—		—		45	7
Viking	2023	Eliteserien	11	2	2	1	—		—		13	3
Career total			401	66	39	7	3	1	26	4	469	80

=== International ===
Appearances and goals by national team and year
National team	Year	Apps	Goals
Iceland	2010	3	0
Iceland	2011	5	0
Iceland	2012	9	2
Iceland	2013	10	2
Iceland	2014	8	0
Iceland	2015	8	2
Iceland	2016	13	2
Iceland	2017	7	1
Iceland	2018	11	1
Iceland	2019	10	3
Iceland	2020	8	0
Iceland	2021	13	1
Iceland	2022	8	1
Total		113	15

Scores and results list Iceland's goal tally first, score column indicates score after each Birkir goal.

List of international goals scored by Birkir Bjarnason
No.	Date	Venue	Opponent	Score	Result	Competition
1	27 May 2012	Stade du Hainaut, Valenciennes, France	France	1–0	2–3	Friendly
2	12 October 2012	Qemal Stafa Stadium, Tirana, Albania	Albania	1–0	2–1	2014 FIFA World Cup qualification
3	7 June 2013	Laugardalsvöllur, Reykjavík, Iceland	Slovenia	1–1	2–4	2014 FIFA World Cup qualification
4	10 September 2013	Laugardalsvöllur, Reykjavík, Iceland	Albania	1–1	2–1	2014 FIFA World Cup qualification
5	28 March 2015	Astana Arena, Astana, Kazakhstan	Kazakhstan	2–0	3–0	UEFA Euro 2016 qualification
6	28 March 2015	Astana Arena, Astana, Kazakhstan	Kazakhstan	3–0	3–0	UEFA Euro 2016 qualification
7	14 June 2016	Stade Geoffroy-Guichard, Saint-Étienne, France	Portugal	1–1	1–1	UEFA Euro 2016
8	3 July 2016	Stade de France, Saint-Denis, France	France	2–5	2–5	UEFA Euro 2016
9	6 October 2017	New Eskişehir Stadium, Eskişehir, Turkey	Turkey	2–0	3–0	2018 FIFA World Cup qualification
10	11 October 2018	Stade de Roudourou, Guingamp, France	France	1–0	2–2	Friendly
11	22 March 2019	Estadi Nacional, Andorra la Vella, Andorra	Andorra	1–0	2–0	UEFA Euro 2020 qualification
12	7 September 2019	Laugardalsvöllur, Reykjavík, Iceland	Moldova	2–0	3–0	UEFA Euro 2020 qualification
13	17 November 2019	Zimbru Stadium, Chișinău, Moldova	Moldova	1–0	2–1	UEFA Euro 2020 qualification
14	31 March 2021	Rheinpark Stadion, Vaduz, Liechtenstein	Liechtenstein	2–0	4–1	2022 FIFA World Cup qualification
15	26 March 2022	Estadio Nueva Condomina, Murcia, Spain	Finland	1–1	1–1	Friendly

== Honours ==
FC Basel

- Swiss Super League: 2015–16

Aston Villa

- EFL Championship play-offs: 2019
