= Patrick Nuamah =

Italian footballer (born 2005)

Personal information
- Full name: Patrick Amoako Nuamah
- Date of birth: 31 December 2005 (age 20)
- Place of birth: Brescia, Italy
- Height: 1.79 m (5 ft 10 in)
- Positions: Midfielder; winger

Team information
- Current team: Sabadell (on loan from Sassuolo)
- Number: 29

Youth career
- –2022: Brescia

Senior career*
Years	Team	Apps	(Gls)
2022–2025	Brescia	30	(1)
2025–	Sassuolo	0	(0)
2025–2026	→ Catanzaro (loan)	27	(0)
2026–	→ Sabadell (loan)	0	(0)

International career^{‡}
2022	Italy U18	2	(0)
2025–	Italy U20	4	(0)
2026–	Italy U21	1	(0)
- * Club domestic league appearances and goals as of 10 May 2026 ‡ National team caps and goals as of 8 June 2026

Patrick Amoako Nuamah (born 31 December 2005) is an Italian professional footballer who plays as a midfielder and winger for Segunda División club Sabadell, on loan from Serie A club Sassuolo.

== Club career ==
=== Brescia ===
Born in Brescia, Italy, to Ghanaian parents, Nuamah started playing football in the youth academy of the city's local football team. At Brescia, he progressed through the youth ranks before signing his first professional contract with the club in July 2022, penning a three-year deal.

After being promoted to Brescia's first team in the same summer, under head coach Pep Clotet, Nuamah made his professional debut on 3 September 2022, coming in as a substitute for Stefano Moreo in the 83rd minute of a Serie B match against Perugia, which ended in a 2–1 win for his side. At 16 years and 243 days, he became the club's third youngest ever player, as well as the youngest player ever to feature in the Italian second-tier (a record that would be broken by Brayan Gjyla in August 2023).

=== Sassuolo ===
On 19 July 2025, Nuamah signed with Sassuolo, and was loaned out to Catanzaro in Serie B for the 2025–26 season.

On 28 August 2026, he joined Spanish Segunda División side Sabadell on a loan deal, ahead of the 2026–27 season.

== International career ==
Nuamah is eligible to represent either Italy or Ghana at international level.

Having previously taken part in training camps with the Italian under-15 and under-16 national teams, he then went on to feature for the under-18 national team in 2022.

== Style of play ==
Nuamah is a central midfielder, who mainly plays in the holding role, but can also act as a mezzala. Ambidextrous and composed on the ball, he has also been regarded for his passing prowess, his physique, his pace and his leadership skills.

He has pointed at Paul Pogba and Stephen Appiah as his biggest sources of inspiration.

== Career statistics ==
As of match played 26 December 2022

Appearances and goals by club, season and competition
Club	Season	League			Coppa Italia		Total	
Club	Season	Division	Apps	Goals	Apps	Goals	Apps	Goals
Brescia	2022–23	Serie B	6	0	1	0	7	0
Career total			6	0	1	0	7	0
