= Torbole Casaglia =

- Comune
- Comune di Torbole Casaglia
- Coat of arms

- Location within Italy Location within Lombardy
- Coordinates: 45°31′N 10°7′E
- Country: Italy
- Region: Lombardy
- Province: Brescia (BS)

Government
  - Mayor: Dario Giannini

Area
  - Total: 13 km^{2} (5.0 sq mi)
- Elevation: 114 m (374 ft)

Population (31 December 2011)
  - Total: 6,460
  - Density: 500/km^{2} (1,300/sq mi)
- Demonym: Torbolesi or Casagliesi
- Time zone: UTC+1 (CET)
  - Summer (DST): UTC+2 (CEST)
- Postal code: 25030
- Dialing code: 030
- Website: Official website

Torbole Casaglia (Brescian: Tórbole) is a comune in the province of Brescia, in Lombardy.
