= Simone Ferrari (footballer) =

Italian footballer

Personal information
- Date of birth: 13 May 1999 (age 27)
- Place of birth: Brescia, Italy
- Height: 1.82 m (6 ft 0 in)
- Position: Midfielder

Team information
- Current team: Desenzano

Youth career
- –2018: Brescia

Senior career*
Years	Team	Apps	(Gls)
2018–2023	Brescia	0	(0)
2018–2019	→ Adrense (loan)	32	(3)
2019–2021	→ Pergolettese (loan)	48	(2)
2021–2022	→ Giana Erminio (loan)	36	(1)
2022–2023	→ Chievo Sona (loan)	32	(4)
2023–	Desenzano	0	(0)
- * Club domestic league appearances and goals as of 7 May 2023

Simone Ferrari (born 13 May 1999) is an Italian football player who plays as a midfielder for Serie D club Desenzano.

== Club career ==
He is a product of Brescia youth teams. He spent the 2018–19 season in Serie D with Adrense. On 8 July 2019 he signed his first professional contract with Brescia for a term of 5 years.

On 15 July 2019 he joined Serie C club Pergolettese on loan. He made his professional Serie C debut for Pergolettese on 25 August 2019 in a game against Como. He started the game and played the whole match.

On 25 September 2020 the loan to Pergolettese was renewed for the 2020–21 season.

For the 2021–22 season, Ferrari was loaned to Giana Erminio.
