= Jakub Łabojko =

Polish footballer (born 1997)

Personal information
- Full name: Jakub Jan Łabojko
- Date of birth: 3 October 1997 (age 29)
- Place of birth: Tarnowskie Góry, Poland
- Height: 1.79 m (5 ft 10 in)
- Position: Midfielder

Team information
- Current team: Piast Gliwice
- Number: 27

Youth career
- –2011: ŁTS Łabędy
- 2011–2012: Piast Gliwice

Senior career*
Years	Team	Apps	(Gls)
2012–2016	Piast Gliwice	0	(0)
2016–2017	Ruch Radzionków	17	(1)
2017	→ Raków Częstochowa (loan)	15	(1)
2017–2018	Raków Częstochowa	30	(2)
2018–2020	Śląsk Wrocław	57	(3)
2020–2023	Brescia	67	(1)
2022	→ AEK Larnaca (loan)	5	(0)
2023–2024	Ternana	23	(0)
2025–2026	Motor Lublin	44	(2)
2026–	Piast Gliwice	8	(2)

International career
2017–2018	Poland U20	5	(0)
2018	Poland U21	1	(0)
- * Club domestic league appearances and goals as of 14:51, 15 September 2026 (UTC)

Jakub Jan Łabojko (born 3 October 1997) is a Polish professional footballer who plays as a midfielder for Ekstraklasa club Piast Gliwice.

== Senior career ==
Łabojko began his professional career with Piast Gliwice with whom he won the Silesian youth championship. Łabojko never played for the Piast first team however, and joined Ruch Radzionków in 2016. He made 17 IV liga appearances for Ruch, scoring once, before joining Raków Częstochowa on loan until the end of the season. After a successful loan spell Łabojko made a permanent move to Raków, playing with the team for the 2017–18 season. After making a total of 45 appearances for Raków, Łabojko moved to Śląsk Wrocław for the beginning of the 2018–19 season. He made his league debut for Śląsk coming on as a substitute in a 3–3 draw with Zagłębie Sosnowiec.

On 18 September 2020, he signed with Italian Serie B club Brescia.

On 26 January 2022, he was loaned to Cypriot First Division side AEK Larnaca until the end of the season.

On 7 August 2023, Łabojko signed a three-year deal with another Serie B side, Ternana. Ternana was relegated to Serie C at the end of the 2023–24 season. On 7 September 2024, he left the club by mutual consent.

On 28 January 2025, after spending most of the winter break training with Motor Lublin, he joined the Ekstraklasa club on a one-and-a-half-year deal.

On 17 June 2026, Łabojko signed a two-year deal with Piast Gliwice, returning to the Silesian side after ten years.

== Honours ==
Raków Częstochowa

- II liga: 2016–17
