= Emanuele Ndoj =

Association football player (born 1996)

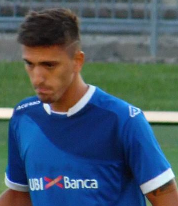

Personal information
- Date of birth: 20 November 1996 (age 29)
- Place of birth: Catania, Italy
- Height: 1.89 m (6 ft 2 in)
- Position: Central midfielder

Team information
- Current team: Folgore Caratese
- Number: 6

Youth career
- –2013: Padova
- 2013–2015: Roma
- 2016: Brescia
- 2016: → Roma (loan)

Senior career*
Years	Team	Apps	(Gls)
2016–2024	Brescia	134	(11)
2022	→ Cosenza (loan)	10	(0)
2024	Catania	8	(0)
2024–2025	Latina	25	(1)
2025–2026	Ascoli	26	(1)
2026–	Folgore Caratese	1	(0)

International career^{‡}
2012	Albania U17	2	(0)
2014	Albania U19	2	(0)
2017–2018	Albania U21	7	(0)
2018–	Albania	6	(1)
- * Club domestic league appearances and goals as of 24 August 2026 ‡ National team caps and goals as of 14 November 2019

Emanuele Ndoj (born 20 November 1996) is a footballer who plays as a midfielder for Serie C Group A club Folgore Caratese. Born in Italy, he represented the Albania national team.

== Club career ==
=== Roma ===
On 22 September 2015, Ndoj renewed his contract with Roma until 2020.

=== Brescia ===
On 1 February 2016, Ndoj was sold to Brescia Calcio and was loaned back to Roma Primavera to play until the end of the season.

On 31 January 2022, Ndoj was loaned to Cosenza.

On 11 January 2024, his contract with Brescia was terminated by mutual consent.

On 9 August 2024, Ndoj signed for Latina.

== International career ==
=== Albania U17 ===
Ndoj received his first Albania under-17 call-up by manager Džemal Mustedanagić for a friendly tournament developed in August 2012 in Romania.

=== Albania U21 ===
He was called up at the Albania national under-21 football team by coach Alban Bushi for a double Friendly match against Moldova U21 on 25 & 27 March 2017. He made his debut for Albania under-21 against Moldova on 25 March playing as a starter in a goalless draw. In other match against the same opponent two days later, Ndoj played as a second-half substitute in a 2–0 victory.

==== 2019 UEFA European Under-21 Championship qualification ====
Ndoj was called up for the Friendly match against France U21 on 5 June 2017 and the 2019 UEFA European Under-21 Championship qualification opening match against Estonia U21 on 12 June 2017. During the gathering for these matches Ndoj among Leonardo Maloku & Qazim Laçi suffered injures and coach Alban Bushi called up Agim Zeka and Regi Lushkja as a replacement. Ndoj was expected by Albania U21 to recover in time for the opening match of the qualifiers against Estonia U21 on 12 June 2017, but medical staff said that he couldn't play in this match.

=== Albania senior team ===
Following his good running form at Brescia during the 2017–18 season, Ndoj received his first senior international call up to Albania senior team by coach Christian Panucci for the 2018 FIFA World Cup qualification matches against Spain and Italy on 6 and 9 October 2017. On 29 May 2018 he did his debut for the senior national team in a 3–0 loss against Kosovo in a friendly.

== Personal life ==
Ndoj was born in Italy to Albanian parents from Rubik.

== Career statistics ==
=== Club ===
As of match played 10 April 2021

Appearances and goals by club, season and competition
Club	Season	League			Cup		Europe (Note: Including continental competitions, such as UEFA Champions League and UEFA Europa League)		Other (Note: Including other competitions, such as Supercoppa Italiana)		Total	
Club	Season	Division	Apps	Goals	Apps	Goals	Apps	Goals	Apps	Goals	Apps	Goals
Brescia	2016–17	Serie B	17	0	1	0	—		—		18	0
Brescia	2017–18	Serie B	22	1	2	0	—		—		24	1
Brescia	2018–19	Serie B	28	3	2	0	—		—		30	3
Brescia	2019–20	Serie A	18	0	0	0	—		—		18	0
Brescia	2020–21	Serie B	9	5	1	0	—		—		10	5
Brescia	Total		94	9	1	0	0	0	0	0	100	9
Career total			94	9	6	0	0	0	0	0	100	9

=== International ===
Scores and results list Albania's goal tally first.

No.	Date	Venue	Opponent	Score	Result	Competition
1.	3 June 2018	Camille Fournier Stadium, Évian-les-Bains, France	Ukraine	1–3	1–4	Friendly
