= Massimo Bertagnoli =

Italian football player

Personal information
- Date of birth: 26 February 1999 (age 27)
- Place of birth: Verona, Italy
- Height: 1.78 m (5 ft 10 in)
- Position: Midfielder

Team information
- Current team: Reggiana
- Number: 26

Youth career
- –2019: Chievo

Senior career*
Years	Team	Apps	(Gls)
2019–2021	Chievo	33	(2)
2020	→ Fermana (loan)	3	(0)
2021–2025	Brescia	105	(6)
2025–	Reggiana	28	(1)
- * Club domestic league appearances and goals as of 13 May 2026

Massimo Bertagnoli (born 26 February 1999) is an Italian football player who plays for Serie C Group B club Reggiana.

== Club career ==
He is a product of Chievo youth teams. On 5 July 2019 he signed his first professional contract with the club for a 5-year term.

He made his professional Serie B debut for Chievo on 25 August 2019 in a game against Perugia. He started the game and played the whole match.

On 27 January 2020, he joined Fermana on loan until the end of the 2019–20 season.

On 13 August 2021 he joined Brescia.

On 8 July 2025, Bertagnoli moved to Reggiana on a two-season contract.
