= Nicolas Galazzi =

Italian footballer (born 2000)

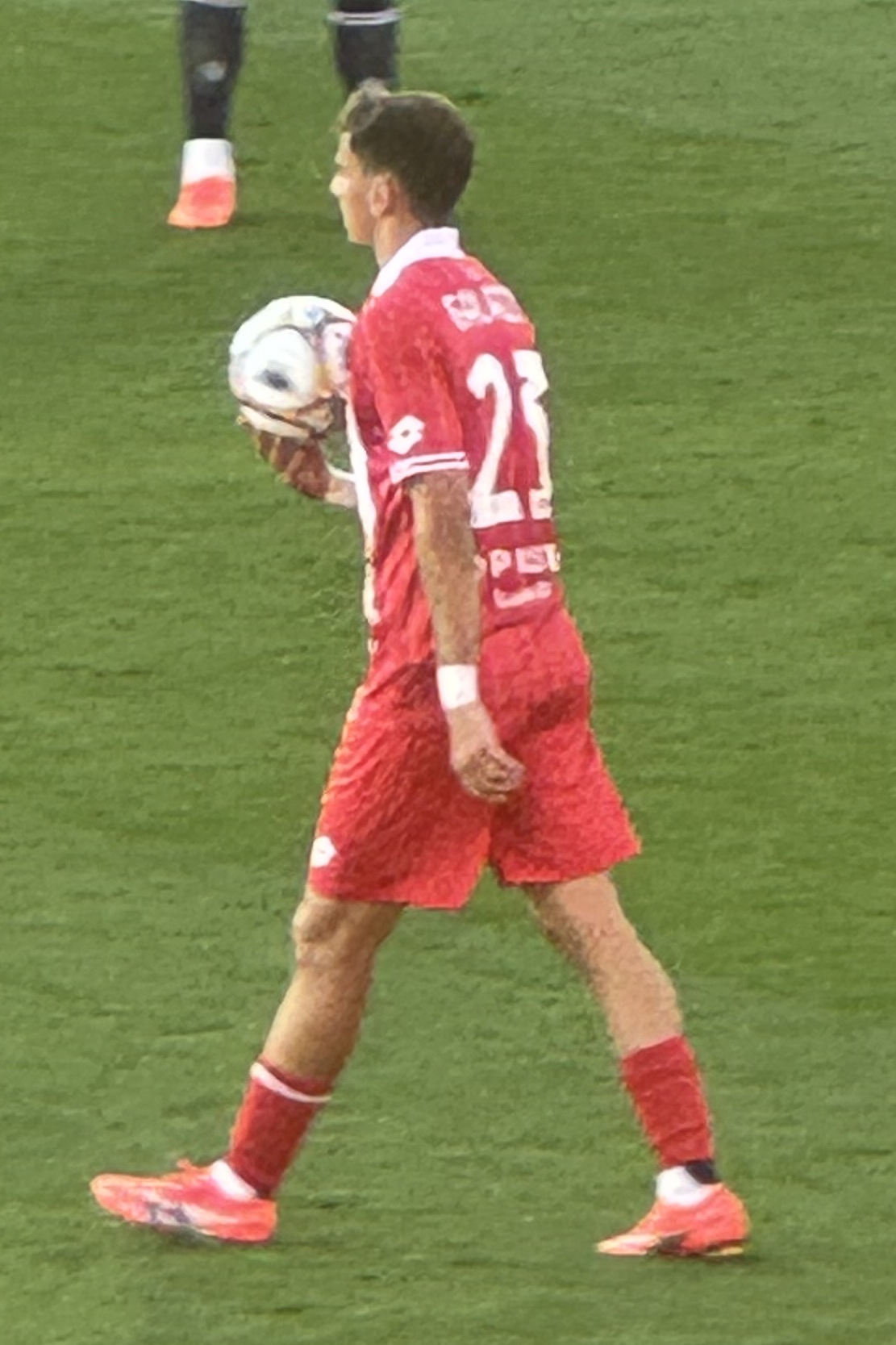
- Galazzi with Monza in 2025

Personal information
- Date of birth: 18 December 2000 (age 25)
- Place of birth: Pavia, Italy
- Height: 1.82 m (6 ft 0 in)
- Positions: Attacking midfielder; winger

Team information
- Current team: Padova (on loan from Monza)
- Number: 25

Youth career
- Accademia Pavese
- Inter Milan

Senior career*
| Years | Team | Apps | (Gls) |
| 2018–2019 | Inter Milan | 0 | (0) |
| 2018–2019 | → Fanfulla (loan) | 24 | (3) |
| 2019–2021 | Piacenza | 0 | (0) |
| 2019–2020 | → Vigor Carpaneto (loan) | 22 | (2) |
| 2021–2022 | Venezia | 1 | (0) |
| 2021 | → Piacenza (loan) | 35 | (2) |
| 2021–2022 | → Triestina (loan) | 30 | (4) |
| 2022–2025 | Brescia | 83 | (6) |
| 2025– | Monza | 12 | (0) |
| 2026– | → Padova (loan) | 0 | (0) |
- * Club domestic league appearances and goals as of 22 August 2026

Nicolas Galazzi (born 18 December 2000) is an Italian professional footballer who plays as an attacking midfielder or winger for Serie B club Padova, on loan from Monza.

== Career ==
A youth product of Academia Pavese and Inter Milan, Galazzi was loaned to Serie D club Fanfulla in 2018, where he made his senior debut. He left Inter in 2019, and joined Piacenza, who loaned the player to Serie D club Vigor Carpaneto.

In February 2021, Galazzi signed for Venezia, and stayed on loan at Piacenza until the remainder of the season. He made his Serie A debut for Venezia on 22 August 2021, as a late substitute against Napoli. On 28 August 2021, he was loaned to Triestina.

On 30 June 2022, Galazzi moved to Brescia, as a part of the move of Jesse Joronen from Brescia to Venezia. On 8 July 2025, he signed with Serie B club Monza. He was sent on a one-year loan to Padova on 1 September 2026.
