= Stadio Mario Rigamonti =

Football stadium in Brescia, Italy

Coordinates: 45°34′14″N 10°14′13″E

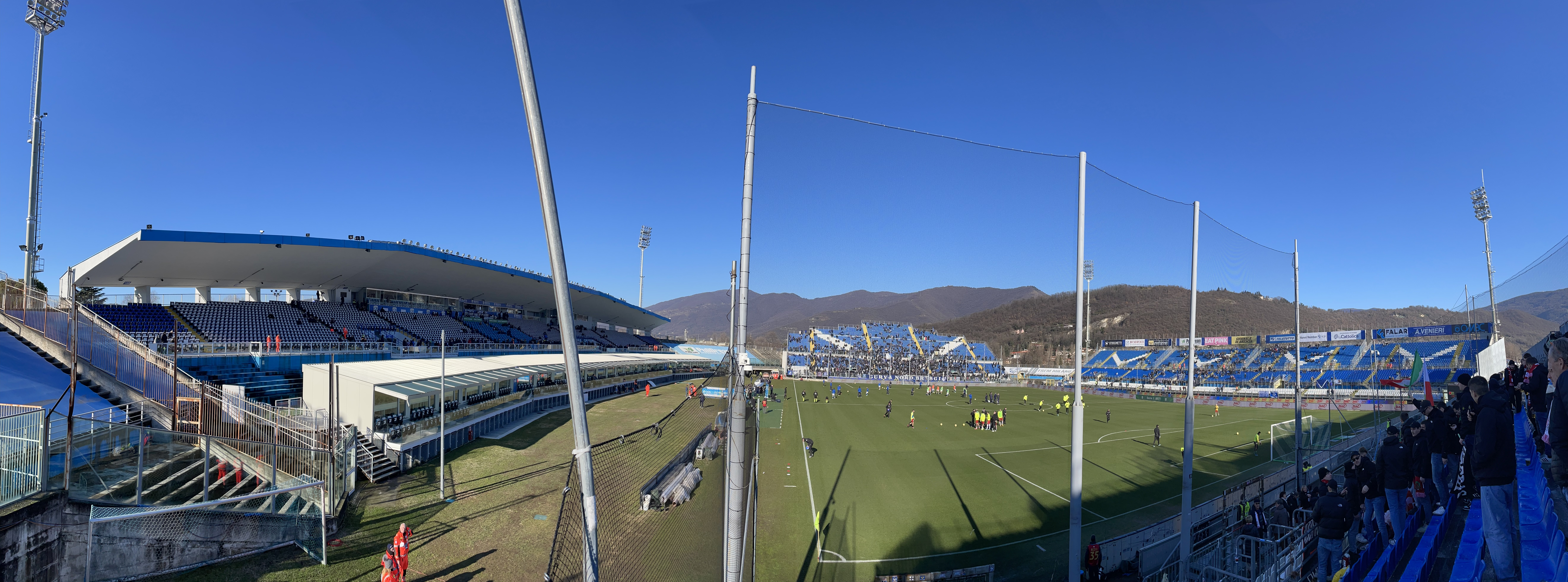
- Stadio Mario Rigamonti in 2024
- Interactive map of Stadio Mario Rigamonti
- Location: Brescia, Italy
- Owner: Municipality of Brescia
- Capacity: 19,550
- Surface: Grass
- Field size: 105 m × 68 m (344 ft × 223 ft)

Construction
- Opened: 1959

Tenants
- Brescia (1959–2025); Union Brescia (2025–present); Italy national football team (selected matches)

Stadio Mario Rigamonti is a football stadium located in Brescia, Italy. It is currently the home of Union Brescia.

It is dedicated to Mario Rigamonti, a defender of the Grande Torino, born in Brescia, who died in the Superga air disaster in May 1949.

== Gallery ==
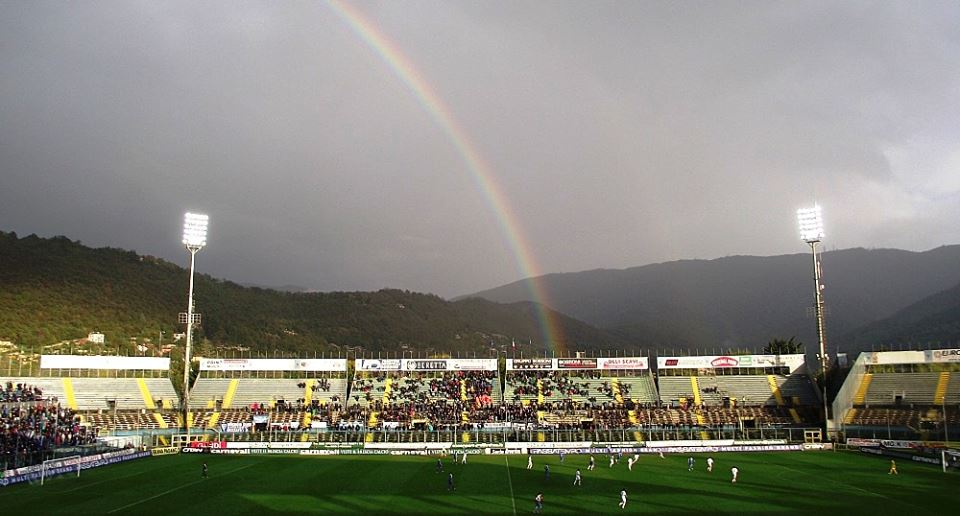
Stadio Rigamonti in 2015
