= Davide Adorni =

Italian footballer (born 1992)

Personal information
- Date of birth: 9 August 1992 (age 34)
- Place of birth: Parma, Italy
- Height: 1.85 m (6 ft 1 in)
- Position: Defender

Team information
- Current team: Modena
- Number: 28

Youth career
- Parma

Senior career*
Years	Team	Apps	(Gls)
2012–2013	Parma	0	(0)
2012–2013	→ Renate (loan)	18	(0)
2013–2017	Cesena	0	(0)
2013–2014	→ Renate (loan)	12	(0)
2015–2017	→ Santarcangelo (loan)	61	(1)
2017	Santarcangelo	0	(0)
2017–2022	Cittadella	120	(6)
2022–2025	Brescia	105	(4)
2025–	Modena	28	(1)
- * Club domestic league appearances and goals as of 10 May 2026

Davide Adorni (born 9 August 1992) is an Italian professional footballer who plays as a defender for Serie B club Modena.

== Career ==
Born in Parma, Emilia region, Adorni started his career at hometown club Parma. He was a member of the under-17 youth team for the 2008–09 season. He spent 3 seasons with Parma reserves from 2009 to 2012. He made 30 league appearances only.

Adorni left for partner club Renate on 4 July 2012 along with fellow youth products Miloš Malivojević, Antonio Santurro and Emiliano Storani.

=== Cesena ===
On 29 June 2013, half of the registration rights of Adorni were exchanged with half of the card of Marco Paolini from Cesena. Adorni signed a four-year contract. On 5 July 2013, the loans of Adorni and Santurro were renewed from Parma. Renate also signed Matteo Cincilla and Filippo Lauricella from Parma reserve. In June 2014, Adorni and Paolini were signed by Cesena and Parma outright.

=== Santarcangelo ===
In January 2015, Adorni joined Santarcangelo in a temporary deal. In summer 2015, the loan was extended. On 3 August 2016, the loan was extended again, with an obligation to sign him outright at the end of season. Santarcangelo also signed Matteo Ronchi and Salvatore Maiorana on the same day from Cesena.

=== Cittadella ===
On 18 July 2017, Adorni was signed by Cittadella.

=== Brescia ===
On 31 January 2022, Adorni joined Brescia.

=== Modena ===
On 9 July 2025, Adorni signed a two-year contract with Modena.
