= Matthieu Huard =

French footballer (born 1998)

Personal information
- Date of birth: 9 May 1998 (age 28)
- Place of birth: Neuilly-sur-Seine, France
- Height: 1.77 m (5 ft 10 in)
- Position: Left-back

Team information
- Current team: Red Star
- Number: 3

Youth career
- 2006–2006: Chapelle-des-Fougeretz
- 2006–2016: Rennes

Senior career*
Years	Team	Apps	(Gls)
2016–2019	Rennes II	47	(2)
2019–2021	Ajaccio	52	(0)
2021–2024	Brescia	51	(0)
2024–2025	Ajaccio	22	(0)
2025–	Red Star	26	(1)
- * Club domestic league appearances and goals as of 11 May 2026

Matthieu Huard (born 9 May 1998) is a French professional footballer who plays as a left-back for Ligue 2 club Red Star.

== Career ==
Huard is a youth product of Rennes having joined at the age of 8, and on 18 July 2019 transferred to Ajaccio. He made his professional debut with Ajaccio in a 2–2 Ligue 2 tie with Le Havre on 26 July 2019.

On 4 September 2021, he signed with Brescia in Italy.

On 29 August 2024, Huard returned to Ajaccio. On 30 July 2025, he signed for Red Star.
