= Giacomo Olzer =

Italian footballer

Personal information
- Date of birth: 14 April 2001 (age 25)
- Place of birth: Rovereto, Italy
- Height: 1.88 m (6 ft 2 in)
- Position: Midfielder

Team information
- Current team: Modena

Youth career
- Unione Sportiva Rovereto
- 2014–2017: ChievoVerona
- 2017–2018: US Mori Santo Stefano
- 2018–2021: AC Milan

Senior career*
Years	Team	Apps	(Gls)
2020–2021	AC Milan	0	(0)
2021–2025	Brescia	70	(4)
2025–2026	Pescara	28	(6)
2026–	Modena	0	(0)

International career^{‡}
2018	Italy U18	1	(0)
- * Club domestic league appearances and goals as of 13 May 2026 ‡ National team caps and goals as of 12 January 2021

Giacomo Olzer (born 14 April 2001) is an Italian professional footballer who plays as a midfielder for Serie B club Modena.

== Club career ==
Olzer made his professional debut for Milan on 12 January 2021 in the Coppa Italia round of 16 match against Torino.

On 9 July 2021, Milan announced that they had reached an agreement with Brescia for the transfer of Olzer in a deal worth €16 million, plus a maximum of €3 million in bonuses, with Milan retaining a buy-back option for Olzer. The deal was also coordinated with a swap of Sandro Tonali, who moved in the opposite direction.

On 17 July 2025, Olzer signed a three-year contract with Pescara.

On 9 July 2026, Olzer moved to Modena on a three-year deal, with an optional fourth year.

== Career statistics ==
As of match played 5 October 2025

Appearances and goals by club, season and competition
Club	Season	League			National Cup		Continental		Total	
Club	Season	Division	Apps	Goals	Apps	Goals	Apps	Goals	Apps	Goals
AC Milan	2020–21	Serie A	0	0	1	0	0	0	1	0
AC Milan	Total		0	0	1	0	0	0	1	0
Brescia	2021–22	Serie B	4	0	0	0	—		4	0
Brescia	2022–23	Serie B	15	3	1	0	—		16	3
Brescia	2023–24	Serie B	28	0	0	0	—		28	0
Brescia	2024–25	Serie B	25	1	2	2	—		27	3
Brescia	Total		72	4	3	2	0	0	75	6
Pescara	2025–26	Serie B	7	3	2	0	—		9	3
Career total			79	7	6	2	0	0	85	9
