= List of Como 1907 seasons =

This is a list of seasons played by Como 1907 in Italian and European football. It details the club's achievements in major competitions, managers, and top league goalscorers for each season.

== Key ==
- CL = UEFA Champions League
- CIC = Coppa Italia Serie C
- CID = Coppa Italia Serie D
- Pld = Matches played
- W = Matches won
- D = Matches drawn
- L = Matches lost
- GF = Goals for
- GA = Goals against
- Pts = Points
- Pos = Final position
- SF = Semi-finals
- R16 = Round of 16
- R32 = Round of 32
- R64 = Round of 64
- GS = Group stage
- PR = Preliminary round
- R1 = Round 1
- R2 = Round 2
- R3 = Round 3

Winner	Runners-up	Third place	Promotion	Relegation

== Seasons ==
As of 24 May 2026

Season	League^{1}										Coppa Italia^{2}	UEFA Continental	Top goalscorer(s)^{3}	
Season	Division	Tier	Pld	W	D	L	GF	GA	Pts	Pos	Coppa Italia^{2}	UEFA Continental	Top goalscorer(s)^{3}	
as Como Foot-Ball Club
1999–2000	Serie C1, Group A	III	34	9	17	8	32	38	44	10th	GS			
2000–01	Serie C1, Group A	III	34	22	6	6	44	18	72	↑ 2nd	GS^{CIC}			
2001–02	Serie B	II	38	22	8	8	53	35	74	↑ 1st	R16			
2002–03	Serie A	I	34	4	12	18	29	57	24	↓ 17th	R32			
2003–04	Serie B	II	46	7	12	27	34	71	33	↓ 24th	GS			
2004–05	Serie C1, Group A	III	36	7	14	15	33	46	29	18th	GS			
as Calcio Como
2005–06	Serie D, Group B	V	34	15	10	9	36	32	55	4th	GS^{CID}			
2006–07	Serie D, Group B	V	34	15	9	10	38	33	54	4th	R1^{CID}			
2007–08	Serie D, Group B	V	34	21	11	2	64	26	74	↑ 1st	Winners^{CID}			
2008–09	Lega Pro Seconda Divisione, Group A	IV	34	15	11	8	40	34	56	↑ 3rd	R1^{CIC}			
2009–10	Lega Pro Prima Divisione, Group A	III	34	9	13	12	27	34	40	12th	R1			
2010–11	Lega Pro Prima Divisione, Group A	III	34	10	15	9	41	40	44	8th	R2			
2011–12	Lega Pro Prima Divisione, Group A	III	34	10	9	15	39	47	36	13th	R1			
2012–13	Lega Pro Prima Divisione, Group A	III	32	9	12	11	44	50	38	12th	R2^{CIC}			
2013–14	Lega Pro Prima Divisione, Group A	III	30	10	12	8	37	32	42	8th	GS^{CIC}			
2014–15	Lega Pro, Group A	III	38	20	7	11	48	33	67	↑ 4th	R3			
2015–16	Serie B	II	42	5	18	19	39	64	33	↓ 22nd	R2			
2016–17	Lega Pro, Group A	III	38	15	14	9	55	49	59	7th	R2			
as Como 1907
2017–18	Serie D, Group A	IV	38	25	6	7	58	27	81	2nd	R64^{CID}			
2018–19	Serie D, Group B	IV	34	28	5	1	68	18	89	↑ 1st	R1			
2019–20	Serie C, Group A	III	26	7	11	8	28	25	32	13th	GS^{CIC}		(Italy) Alessandro Gabrielloni	10
2020–21	Serie C, Group A	III	38	23	6	9	59	44	75	↑ 1st	cancelled		(Italy) Massimiliano Gatto	13
2021–22	Serie B	II	38	11	14	13	49	54	47	13th	PR		(Italy) Alberto Cerri	10
2022–23	Serie B	II	38	10	17	11	47	48	47	13th	R1		(Italy) Alberto Cerri (Italy) Patrick Cutrone	9
2023–24	Serie B	II	38	21	10	7	58	40	73	↑ 2nd	R1		(Italy) Patrick Cutrone	14
2024–25	Serie A	I	38	13	10	15	49	52	49	10th	R1		(Senegal) Assane Diao	8
2025–26	Serie A	I	38	20	11	7	65	29	71	4th	SF		(Greece) Anastasios Douvikas	14

- 1. For details of league structure, see Italian football league system.
- 2. The first edition was held in 1922, but the second champions were not crowned until 1936.
- 3. Only league goals are counted. The Serie A Golden Boot known as Capocannoniere (plural: capocannonieri) is the award given to the highest goalscorer in Serie A.
