= 2022–23 Como 1907 season =

Como 1907
2022–23 season
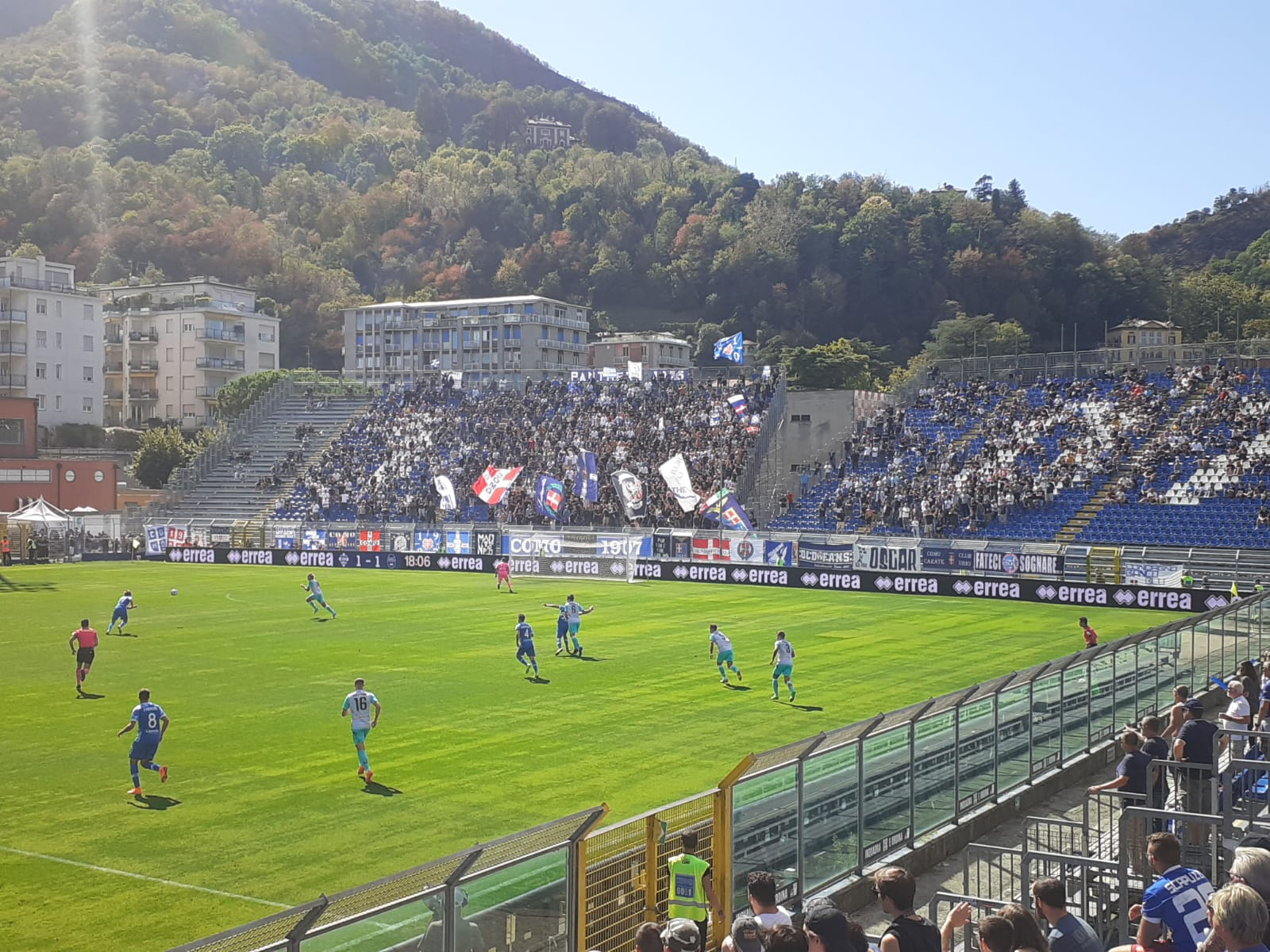
- Como playing against S.P.A.L. (17 September 2022).
- Owner: Djarum Group
- President: Dennis Wise
- Head coach: Moreno Longo
- Stadium: Stadio Giuseppe Sinigaglia
- Serie B: 13th
- Coppa Italia: Round of 64
| Home colours | Away colours |

The 2022–23 season was the 116th in the history of Como 1907 and their second consecutive season in the second division. The club participated in Serie B and the Coppa Italia.

== Players ==
As of 12 January 2023

Note: Flags indicate national team as defined under FIFA eligibility rules; some limited exceptions apply. Players may hold more than one non-FIFA nationality.

| No. | Pos. | Nation | Player |
|---|---|---|---|
| 1 | GK | ITA | Simone Ghidotti |
| 2 | DF | ENG | Luis Binks (on loan from Bologna) |
| 3 | DF | ITA | Andrea Cagnano |
| 4 | MF | ESP | Cesc Fàbregas |
| 5 | MF | ITA | Jacopo Da Riva (on loan from Atalanta) |
| 6 | MF | ITA | Alessio Iovine |
| 7 | MF | BEL | Moutir Chajia |
| 8 | MF | ITA | Paolo Faragò |
| 9 | FW | ITA | Alessandro Gabrielloni |
| 10 | MF | ITA | Daniele Baselli |
| 11 | FW | ITA | Vittorio Parigini (on loan from Genoa) |
| 12 | GK | ITA | Pierre Bolchini |
| 14 | MF | ITA | Alessandro Bellemo |
| 16 | DF | ITA | Matteo Solini |
| 19 | MF | ESP | Álex Blanco |
| 20 | FW | IRL | Liam Kerrigan |

| No. | Pos. | Nation | Player |
|---|---|---|---|
| 21 | MF | ITA | Tommaso Arrigoni |
| 22 | GK | ITA | Luca Zanotti |
| 23 | DF | ITA | Filippo Scaglia |
| 24 | MF | ITA | Enrico Celeghin |
| 25 | MF | SEN | Racine Ba |
| 26 | DF | NED | Cas Odenthal |
| 27 | FW | ITA | Alberto Cerri (on loan from Cagliari) |
| 28 | DF | ITA | Luca Vignali |
| 30 | DF | ITA | Elia Di Giuliomaria |
| 32 | GK | SEN | Alfred Gomis (on loan from Rennes) |
| 33 | DF | ITA | Filippo Delli Carri |
| 44 | DF | CYP | Nicholas Ioannou |
| 63 | FW | ITA | Patrick Cutrone |
| 70 | FW | ITA | Giuseppe Ambrosino (on loan from Napoli) |
| 77 | FW | ITA | Leonardo Mancuso (on loan from Monza) |
| 99 | GK | ITA | Mauro Vigorito (on loan from Cosenza) |
| — | DF | ITA | Edoardo Pierozzi (on loan from Fiorentina) |

=== Other players under contract ===
Note: Flags indicate national team as defined under FIFA eligibility rules; some limited exceptions apply. Players may hold more than one non-FIFA nationality.

| No. / Pos. / Nation / Player; — / MF / MAR / Ismail H'Maidat | No. / Pos. / Nation / Player; — / FW / ITA / Massimiliano Gatto |

=== Out on loan ===
As of 25 August 2022

Note: Flags indicate national team as defined under FIFA eligibility rules; some limited exceptions apply. Players may hold more than one non-FIFA nationality.

| No. | Pos. | Nation | Player |
|---|---|---|---|
| — | DF | ITA | Paolo Chierichetti (on loan to Alcione until 30 June 2023) |

== Pre-season and friendlies ==
Win Draw Loss Fixtures

| 23 July 2022 Friendly | Atalanta (Italy) | 4–0 | (Italy) Como | Bergamo |
| 17:00 CEST (UTC+2) | Palomino 66'; Éderson 69'; Zortea 88'; Lammers 89' | Report | | Stadium: Centro Sportivo Bortolotti; Attendance: 0 Referee: Alberto Santoro |

| 30 July 2022 Friendly | Como (Italy) | 15–0 | (Italy) ASD Cantù Sanpaolo | Como |
| 10:00 CEST (UTC+2) | | Report | | Stadium: Stadio Giuseppe Sinigaglia |

| 30 July 2022 Friendly | Como (Italy) | 4–0 | (Italy) Stresa Vergante | Como |
| 18:00 CEST (UTC+2) | Mancuso 26', 40'; Cerri 45', 58' | Report | | Stadium: Stadio Giuseppe Sinigaglia |

| 20 November 2022 Friendly | Como (Italy) | 3–1 | (England) Brentford B | Como |
| 15:00 CET (UTC+2) | Gabrielloni 18' (pen.), 35'; Chinetti 54' | Report | Pressley 67' | Stadium: Stadio Giuseppe Sinigaglia; Referee: Santoro di Messina |

| 7 January 2023 Friendly | Como (Italy) | 4–0 | (Italy) Tritium | Como |
| 11:15 CET (UTC+2) | | | | Stadium: Stadio Giuseppe Sinigaglia |

| 24 March 2023 Friendly | Como (Italy) | 2–2 | (Switzerland) Lugano | Como |
| 11:00 CET (UTC+2) | Cerri 58'; Da Cunha 69' | | Sabbatini 26', 34' | Stadium: Stadio Giuseppe Sinigaglia |

== Competitions ==
=== Overall record ===
| Competition | First match | Last match | Starting round | Final position | Record | | | | | | | |
| Competition | First match | Last match | Starting round | Final position | Pld | W | D | L | GF | GA | GD | Win % |
|---|---|---|---|---|---|---|---|---|---|---|---|---|
| Serie B | 13 August 2022 | 19 May 2023 | Matchday 1 | | 32 | 9 | 13 | 10 | 39 | 41 | −2 | 28.13 |
| Coppa Italia | 6 August 2022 | | Round of 64 | Round of 64 | 1 | 0 | 0 | 1 | 1 | 5 | −4 | 0.00 |
| Total | | | | | 33 | 9 | 13 | 11 | 40 | 46 | −6 | 27.27 |

Last updated: 10 April 2023
Source: Soccerway

=== Serie B ===
==== League table ====
| Pos | Team | Pld | W | D | L | GF | GA | GD | Pts |
|---|---|---|---|---|---|---|---|---|---|
| 11 | Pisa | 38 | 11 | 14 | 13 | 48 | 42 | +6 | 47 (Note: Head-to-head points: Pisa 5, Ascoli 5, Como 4. Head-to-head goal difference: Pisa +1, Ascoli −1.) |
| 12 | Ascoli | 38 | 12 | 11 | 15 | 40 | 47 | −7 | 47 |
| 13 | Como | 38 | 10 | 17 | 11 | 47 | 48 | −1 | 47 |
| 14 | Ternana | 38 | 11 | 10 | 17 | 37 | 52 | −15 | 43 (Note: Ternana finished ahead of Cittadella on head-to-head goal difference: Cittadella 0–2 Ternana, Ternana 1–2 Cittadella.) |
| 15 | Cittadella | 38 | 9 | 16 | 13 | 34 | 45 | −11 | 43 |

Source: Soccerway (in English)
Rules for classification: 1) Points; 2) Head-to-head points; 3) Head-to-head goal difference; 4) Goal difference; 5) Goals scored; 6) Draw.

==== Results summary ====
| Overall | | | | | | | | Home | | | | | | Away | | | | | |
| Pld | W | D | L | GF | GA | GD | Pts | W | D | L | GF | GA | GD | W | D | L | GF | GA | GD |
|---|---|---|---|---|---|---|---|---|---|---|---|---|---|---|---|---|---|---|---|
| 38 | 10 | 17 | 11 | 47 | 48 | −1 | 47 | 8 | 7 | 4 | 28 | 20 | +8 | 2 | 10 | 7 | 19 | 28 | −9 |

Last updated: 19 May 2023.
Source: Serie B

==== Results by round ====
| Round | 1 | 2 | 3 | 4 | 5 | 6 | 7 | 8 | 9 | 10 | 11 | 12 | 13 | 14 | 15 | 16 | 17 | 18 | 19 | 20 | 21 | 22 | 23 | 24 | 25 | 26 | 27 | 28 | 29 | 30 | 31 | 32 | 33 | 34 | 35 | 36 | 37 | 38 |
|---|---|---|---|---|---|---|---|---|---|---|---|---|---|---|---|---|---|---|---|---|---|---|---|---|---|---|---|---|---|---|---|---|---|---|---|---|---|---|
| Ground | H | A | H | A | H | H | A | H | A | H | A | H | A | H | A | A | H | A | H | A | H | A | H | A | A | H | A | H | A | H | A | H | A | H | H | A | H | A |
| Result | D | D | L | L | L | D | L | W | L | W | L | W | D | D | D | D | L | W | W | L | D | W | L | D | D | W | D | W | D | W | L | D | D | D | D | L | W | D |
| Position | 12 | 13 | 17 | 18 | 19 | 19 | 20 | 19 | 19 | 19 | 19 | 16 | 18 | 18 | 19 | 19 | 19 | 17 | 15 | 16 | 16 | 13 | 15 | 14 | 16 | 14 | 14 | 13 | 11 | 10 | 12 | 11 | 13 | 13 | 13 | 13 | 12 | 13 |

Updated to match(es) played on 19 May 2023. Source: Serie B
A = Away; H = Home; W = Win; D = Draw; L = Loss

==== Matches ====
The league fixtures were announced on 15 July 2022.

| 13 August 2022 1 | Como | 1–1 | Cagliari | Como |
| 20:45 CEST (UTC+2) | Mancuso 19' | Report | Pereiro 90+3' | Stadium: Stadio Giuseppe Sinigaglia; Referee: Gianluca Manganiello |

| 21 August 2022 2 | Pisa | 2–2 | Como | Pisa |
| 20:45 CEST (UTC+2) | Moruţan 24' (pen.); Torregrossa 89' | Report | Blanco 5'; Kerrigan 77' | Stadium: Arena Garibaldi; Referee: Daniele Doveri |

| 29 August 2022 3 | Como | 0–1 | Brescia | Como |
| 20:45 CEST (UTC+2) | | Report | Bertagnoli 45' | Stadium: Stadio Giuseppe Sinigaglia; Referee: Gianpiero Miele |

| 3 September 2022 4 | Frosinone | 2–0 | Como | Frosinone |
| 14:00 CEST (UTC+2) | Kone 22'; Mulattieri 71' | Report | | Stadium: Stadio Benito Stirpe; Referee: Davide Massa |

| 10 September 2022 5 | Como | 0–2 | Südtirol | Como |
| 14:00 CEST (UTC+2) | | Report | Mazzocchi 79'; Casiraghi 87' (pen.) | Stadium: Stadio Giuseppe Sinigaglia; Referee: Ermanno Feliciani |

| 17 September 2022 6 | Como | 3–3 | SPAL | Como |
| 14:00 CEST (UTC+2) | Cutrone 12', 46'; Ioannou 72' | Report | Maistro 8'; Moncini 59'; Esposito 90+3' | Stadium: Stadio Giuseppe Sinigaglia; Referee: Daniele Rutella |

| 30 September 2022 7 | Cosenza | 3–1 | Como | Cosenza |
| 20:30 CEST (UTC+2) | D'Urso 31'; Rigione 37'; Meroni 85' | Report | Vignali 41' | Stadium: Stadio San Vito-Gigi Marulla; Referee: Ivano Pezzuto |

| 9 October 2022 8 | Como | 1–0 | Perugia | Como |
| 16:15 CEST (UTC+2) | Arrigoni 34' | Report | | Stadium: Stadio Giuseppe Sinigaglia; Referee: Matteo Gariglio |

| 15 October 2022 9 | Modena | 5–1 | Como | Modena |
| 14:00 CEST (UTC+2) | Pergreffi 11', 23'; Armellino 41'; Diaw 50'; Magino 72' | Report | Cutrone 84' | Stadium: Stadio Alberto Braglia; Referee: Federico La Penna |

| 22 October 2022 10 | Como | 2–1 | Benevento | Como |
| 14:00 CEST (UTC+2) | Cerri 4', 22' | Report | Leverbe 8' | Stadium: Stadio Giuseppe Sinigaglia; Referee: Davide Ghersini |

| 29 October 2022 11 | Parma | 1–0 | Como | Parma |
| 14:00 CEST (UTC+2) | Del Prato 38' | Report | | Stadium: Stadio Ennio Tardini; Referee: Alessandro Prontera |

| 6 November 2022 12 | Como | 1–0 | Venezia | Como |
| 16:15 CEST (UTC+2) | Bellemo 65' | Report | | Stadium: Stadio Giuseppe Sinigaglia; Referee: Gianpiero Miele |

| 13 November 2022 13 | Genoa | 1–1 | Como | Genoa |
| 16:15 CEST (UTC+2) | Coda 17' (pen.) | Report | Cerri 67' | Stadium: Stadio Luigi Ferraris; Referee: Luca Massimi |

| 27 November 2022 14 | Como | 1–1 | Bari | Como |
| 15:00 CEST (UTC+2) | Cerri 45+2' (pen.) | Report | Botta 90' (pen.) | Stadium: Stadio Giuseppe Sinigaglia; Referee: Egidio Marchetti |

| 4 December 2022 15 | Ascoli | 3–3 | Como | Ascoli Piceno |
| 15:00 CEST (UTC+2) | Cerri 6' (o.g.); Ciciretti 73'; Šimić 83' | Report | Mancuso 17', 29'; Blanco 79' | Stadium: Stadio Cino e Lillo Del Duca; Referee: Daniele Chiffi |

| 8 December 2022 16 | Palermo | 0–0 | Como | Palermo |
| 20:30 CEST (UTC+2) | | Report | | Stadium: Stadio Renzo Barbera; Referee: Federico Dionisi |

| 11 December 2022 17 | Como | 0–1 | Reggina | Reggio Calabria |
| 15:00 CEST (UTC+2) | | Report | Hernani 78' (pen.) | Stadium: Stadio Oreste Granillo; Referee: Ivano Pezzuto |

| 18 December 2022 18 | Ternana | 0–3 | Como | Terni |
| 14:00 CEST (UTC+2) | | Report | Cutrone 15'; Ambriosino 77'; Mancuso 90+3' | Stadium: Stadio Libero Liberati; Referee: Daniele Rutella |

| 26 December 2022 19 | Como | 2–0 | Cittadella | Como |
| 15:00 CEST (UTC+2) | Arrigoni 4'; Mancuso 72' | Report | | Stadium: Stadio Giuseppe Sinigaglia; Referee: Marco Guida |

| 14 January 2023 20 | Cagliari | 2–0 | Como | Cagliari |
| 14:00 CEST (UTC+2) | Pavoletti 16'; Azzi 49' | Report | | Stadium: Unipol Domus; Referee: Francesco Meraviglia |

| 21 January 2023 21 | Como | 2–2 | Pisa | Como |
| 14:00 CEST (UTC+2) | Cutrone 10'; Da Riva 90+5' | Report | Tramoni 43'; Masucci 83' | Stadium: Stadio Giuseppe Sinigaglia; Referee: Lorenzo Maggioni |

| 28 January 2023 22 | Brescia | 0–1 | Como | Brescia |
| 14:00 CEST (UTC+2) | Papetti (yellow card) 27' (yellow-red card) 90+4'; Mangraviti (red card) 44'; Björkengren (yellow card) 50'; Łabojko (yellow card) 74' | Report | Binks (yellow card) 16'; Da Riva (yellow card) 23'; Baselli 60' | Stadium: Stadio Mario Rigamonti; Attendance: 4,757; Referee: (Italy) Giacomo Camplone |

| 4 February 2023 23 | Como | 0–2 | Frosinone | Como |
| 16:15 CEST (UTC+2) | Ioannou (yellow card) 66' | Report | Mazzitelli 14'; Caso 29' | Stadium: Stadio Giuseppe Sinigaglia; Attendance: 5,045; Referee: (Italy) Gianluca Manganiello |

| 11 February 2023 24 | Südtirol | 1–1 | Como | Bolzano |
| 14:00 CEST (UTC+2) | Curto (yellow card) 32'; Casiraghi (yellow card) 59'; Tait (yellow card) 68'; Zaro 69'; Masiello (yellow card) 87'; Celli (yellow card) 90+4' | Report | Cerri (yellow card) 45+1' (goal) 90+1' (pen.); Odenthal (yellow card) 64'; Cesc Fàbregas (yellow card) 65'; Bellemo (yellow card) 75'; Parigini (yellow card) 90+4' | Stadium: Stadio Druso; Attendance: 4,193; Referee: (Italy) Antonio Santoro |

| 18 February 2023 25 | SPAL | 1–1 | Como | Ferrara |
| 14:00 CEST (UTC+2) | La Mantia 6'; Nainggolan (yellow card) 60'; Varnier (yellow card) 74'; Arena (yellow card) 84' | Report | Binks (yellow card) 8'; Gabrielloni 38'; Parigini (yellow card) 85' | Stadium: Stadio Paolo Mazza; Attendance: 7,379; Referee: (Italy) Matteo Gariglio |

| 25 February 2023 26 | Como | 5–1 | Cosenza | Como |
| 14:00 CEST (UTC+2) | Gabrielloni 12' 76'; Cutrone 45+3' (pen.); D'Orazio 46' (o.g.); Ioannou (yellow card) 68' (goal) 71' | Report | Marras 26'; Nasti (yellow card) 29'; Brescianini (yellow card) 30' | Stadium: Stadio Giuseppe Sinigaglia; Attendance: 4,836; Referee: (Italy) Matteo Gualtieri |

| 1 March 2023 27 | Perugia | 0–0 | Como | Perugia |
| 20:30 CEST (UTC+2) | Santoro (yellow card) 8'; Ryder Matos (yellow card) 42'; Iannoni (yellow card) 68'; Di Carmine (yellow card) 79' | Report | Iovine (yellow card) 6'; Álex Blanco (yellow card) 15'; Vignali (yellow card) 52'; Cerri (yellow card) 67'; Scaglia (yellow card) 71'; Odenthal (yellow card) 78'; Cagnano (yellow card) 90+2' | Stadium: Stadio Renato Curi; Attendance: 4,542; Referee: (Italy) Daniele Perenzoni |

| 5 March 2023 28 | Como | 1–0 | Modena | Como |
| 15:00 CEST (UTC+2) | Pierozzi (yellow card) 29'; Arrigoni (yellow card) 43'; Da Cunha (yellow card) 45+1'; Cerri 51' | Report | Magnino (yellow card) 27'; De Maio (yellow card) 43' | Stadium: Stadio Giuseppe Sinigaglia; Attendance: 5,092; Referee: (Italy) Daniele Rutella |

| 11 March 2023 29 | Benevento | 0–0 | Como | Benevento |
| 14:00 CEST (UTC+2) | Foulon (yellow card) 35'; Tello (yellow card) 42' (yellow-red card) 47'; Schiattarella (yellow card) 64'; Letizia (yellow card) 90+4' | Report | Arrigoni (yellow card) 51'; Bellemo (yellow card) 62'; Gabrielloni (yellow card) 90+2'; Chajia (yellow card) 90+4' | Stadium: Stadio Ciro Vigorito; Attendance: 7,806; Referee: (Italy) Antonio Santoro |

| 18 March 2023 30 | Como | 2–0 | Parma | Como |
| 14:00 CEST (UTC+2) | Cerri 5'; Odenthal (yellow card) 33'; Arrigoni 53'; Faragò (yellow card) 86' | Report | Circati (red card) 61'; Zagaritis (yellow card) 80' | Stadium: Stadio Giuseppe Sinigaglia; Attendance: 5,913; Referee: (Italy) Francesco Meraviglia |

=== Coppa Italia ===
| 6 August 2022 Round of 64 | Spezia | 5–1 | Como | La Spezia |
| 18:00 CEST (UTC+2) | Nzola 43', 76' (pen.); Verde 60' (pen.); Bastoni (yellow card) 61'; Strelec 71'; Maldini 89' | Report | Cagnano (yellow card) 37'; Blanco 55', (yellow card) 63' | Stadium: Stadio Alberto Picco; Referee: Francesco Meraviglia |
