= 2021–22 Como 1907 season =

Como
- Owner: Djarum Group
- Head coach: Giacomo Gattuso
- Stadium: Stadio Giuseppe Sinigaglia
- Serie B: 13th
- Coppa Italia: Preliminary round
- Top goalscorer: League: Alberto Cerri (10); All: Alberto Cerri (10)

The 2021–22 season was Como 1907's first season back in second division of the Italian football league, the Serie B, and the 115th as a football club.

== Players ==
=== First-team quad ===
As of 31 January 2022.

Note: Flags indicate national team as defined under FIFA eligibility rules; some limited exceptions apply. Players may hold more than one non-FIFA nationality.

No.	Pos.	Nation	Player
1	GK	ITA	Davide Facchin
4	DF	ITA	Matteo Solini
5	DF	ITA	Davide Bertoncini
6	MF	ITA	Alessio Iovine
7	MF	BEL	Moutir Chajia
8	MF	ALB	Elvis Kabashi
9	FW	ITA	Alessandro Gabrielloni
10	FW	ITA	Massimiliano Gatto
11	MF	ITA	Vittorio Parigini (on loan from Genoa)
12	GK	ITA	Pierre Bolchini
14	MF	ITA	Alessandro Bellemo
17	MF	ITA	Amato Ciciretti (on loan from Pordenone)
19	MF	ESP	Álex Blanco
20	MF	ITA	Antonino La Gumina (on loan from Sampdoria)

No.	Pos.	Nation	Player
21	MF	ITA	Tommaso Arrigoni
22	GK	ITA	Luca Zanotti
23	DF	ITA	Filippo Scaglia
24	DF	ITA	Marco Varnier (on loan from Atalanta)
25	MF	ITA	Filippo Nardi (on loan from Cremonese)
27	FW	ITA	Alberto Cerri (on loan from Cagliari)
28	DF	ITA	Luca Vignali (on loan from Spezia)
33	DF	ITA	Andrea Cagnano
44	DF	CYP	Nicholas Ioannou (on loan from Nottingham Forest)
55	MF	ITA	Lorenzo Peli (on loan from Atalanta)
66	GK	ITA	Stefano Gori (on loan from Juventus)
72	FW	ITA	Ettore Gliozzi
98	MF	ITA	Edoardo Bovolon

=== Out on loan ===
As of 31 January 2022

Note: Flags indicate national team as defined under FIFA eligibility rules; some limited exceptions apply. Players may hold more than one non-FIFA nationality.

No.	Pos.	Nation	Player
—	DF	ITA	Paolo Chierichetti (at Alcione until 30 June 2022)
—	DF	ITA	Yuri Mendolia (at Varese until 30 June 2022)

No.	Pos.	Nation	Player
—	MF	ITA	Enrico Celeghin (at Renate until 30 June 2022)
—	MF	MAR	Ismail H'Maidat (at Südtirol until 30 June 2022)

== Pre-season and friendlies ==
Win Draw Loss Fixtures

31 July 2021 Friendly	Como (Italy)	2–0	(Italy) Renate	Meda, Italy
18:30 CEST (UTC+2)				Stadium: Stadio Città di Meda

13 August 2021 Friendly	Juventus U23 (Italy)	1–1	(Italy) Como	Vinovo, Italy
18:00 CEST (UTC+2)	Soulé 4'		Chajia 15'	Stadium: Juventus Training Center; Attendance: 0 Referee: Daniele Virgilio

== Competitions ==
=== Overall record ===
Competition	First match	Last match	Starting round	Final position	Record							
Competition	First match	Last match	Starting round	Final position	Pld	W	D	L	GF	GA	GD	Win %
Serie B	22 August 2021	6 May 2022	Matchday 1	13th	38	11	14	13	49	54	−5	28.95
Coppa Italia	7 August 2021		Preliminary round	Preliminary round	1	0	1	0	2	2	+0	0.00
Total					39	11	15	13	51	56	−5	28.21

Source: Soccerway

=== Serie B ===
==== League table ====
Pos	Team	Pld	W	D	L	GF	GA	GD	Pts
11	Cittadella	38	13	13	12	38	36	+2	52
12	Parma	38	11	16	11	48	43	+5	49
13	Como	38	11	14	13	49	54	−5	47
14	Reggina (Note: Reggina were deducted 2 points for administrative irregularities.)	38	13	9	16	31	49	−18	46
15	SPAL	38	9	15	14	46	54	−8	42

Source: Lega Serie B (in Italian), Soccerway (in English)
Rules for classification: 1) Points; 2) Head-to-head points; 3) Head-to-head goal difference; 4) Goal difference; 5) Goals scored; 6) Draw.

==== Results summary ====
Overall								Home						Away					
Pld	W	D	L	GF	GA	GD	Pts	W	D	L	GF	GA	GD	W	D	L	GF	GA	GD
38	11	14	13	49	54	−5	47	5	7	7	20	21	−1	6	7	6	29	33	−4

Source: Serie B

==== Results by round ====
Round	1	2	3	4	5	6	7	8	9	10	11	12	13	14	15	16	17	18	19	20	21	22	23	24	25	26	27	28	29	30	31	32	33	34	35	36	37	38
Ground	H	A	H	A	H	A	H	A	H	A	H	A	H	A	H	A	H	H	A	A	H	A	H	A	H	A	H	H	A	H	A	H	A	H	A	H	A	H
Result	D	D	L	L	L	D	W	W	D	W	W	W	L	D	D	L	W	D	L	D	D	D	W	W	L	D	D	L	D	D	W	W	L	L	L	L	W	L
Position	8	13	14	16	17	16	16	16	16	15	11	7	12	12	12	13	11	11	11	11	11	12	11	11	11	11	12	12	13	14	12	12	12	13	14	14	12	13

Source: Serie B
A = Away; H = Home; W = Win; D = Draw; L = Loss

==== Matches ====
The league fixtures were announced on 24 July 2021.

22 August 2021 1	Crotone	2–2	Como	Crotone

29 August 2021 2	Lecce	1–1	Como	Lecce

11 September 2021 3	Como	0–1	Ascoli	Como
				Stadium: Stadio Giuseppe Sinigaglia

17 September 2021 4	Como	0–2	Frosinone	Como
				Stadium: Stadio Giuseppe Sinigaglia

21 September 2021 5	Cosenza	2–0	Como	Cosenza

25 September 2021 6	Como	1–1	Benevento	Como
				Stadium: Stadio Giuseppe Sinigaglia

3 October 2021 7	Brescia	2–4	Como	Brescia

16 October 2021 8	Como	2–0	Alessandria	Como
				Stadium: Stadio Giuseppe Sinigaglia

24 October 2021 9	SPAL	1–1	Como	Ferrara

28 October 2021 10	Como	1–0	Pordenone	Como
				Stadium: Stadio Giuseppe Sinigaglia

1 November 2021 11	Ternana	1–2	Como	Terni

6 November 2021 12	Como	4–1	Perugia	Como
				Stadium: Stadio Giuseppe Sinigaglia

21 November 2021 13	Monza	3–2	Como	Monza

28 November 2021 14	Como	1–1	Parma	Como
				Stadium: Stadio Giuseppe Sinigaglia

1 December 2021 15	Cittadella	2–2	Como	Cittadella

5 December 2021 16	Como	0–1	Pisa	Como
				Stadium: Stadio Giuseppe Sinigaglia

12 December 2021 17	Vicenza	0–1	Como	Vicenza

18 December 2021 18	Como	1–1	Reggina	Como
				Stadium: Stadio Giuseppe Sinigaglia

15 January 2022 19	Cremonese	2–0	Como	Cremona
14:00	Buonaiuto 4'; Okoli (yellow card) 28'; Gaetano (yellow card) 35'; Castagnetti (yellow card) 68'; Báez 75'		Vignali (yellow card) 32' (yellow-red card) 57'; Parigini (yellow card) 48'	Stadium: Stadio Giovanni Zini; Attendance: 1,580; Referee: Matteo Gariglio

22 January 2022 20	Como	1–1	Crotone	Como
				Stadium: Stadio Giuseppe Sinigaglia

5 February 2022 21	Como	1–1	Lecce	Como
				Stadium: Stadio Giuseppe Sinigaglia

13 February 2022 22	Ascoli	1–1	Como

16 February 2022 23	Frosinone	1–2	Como	Frosinone

20 February 2022 24	Como	2–1	Cosenza	Como
				Stadium: Stadio Giuseppe Sinigaglia

23 February 2022 25	Benevento	5–0	Como	Benevento

26 February 2022 26	Como	1–1	Brescia	Como
				Stadium: Stadio Giuseppe Sinigaglia

1 March 2022 27	Alessandria	1–1	Como	Alessandria

5 March 2022 28	Como	0–2	SPAL	Como
				Stadium: Stadio Giuseppe Sinigaglia

12 March 2022 29	Pordenone	1–1	Como	Pordenone

15 March 2022 30	Como	1–1	Ternana	Como
				Stadium: Stadio Giuseppe Sinigaglia

20 March 2022 31	Perugia	0–1	Como	Perugia

3 April 2022 32	Como	2–0	Monza	Como
				Stadium: Stadio Giuseppe Sinigaglia

6 April 2022 33	Parma	4–3	Como	Parma

9 April 2022 34	Como	1–2	Cittadella	Como
				Stadium: Stadio Giuseppe Sinigaglia

18 April 2022 35	Pisa	3–1	Como	Pisa

25 April 2022 36	Como	0–2	Vicenza	Como
				Stadium: Stadio Giuseppe Sinigaglia

30 April 2022 37	Reggina	1–4	Como

6 May 2022 38	Como	1–2	Cremonese	Como
				Stadium: Stadio Giuseppe Sinigaglia

=== Coppa Italia ===
7 August 2021 Preliminary round	Como	2–2 (a.e.t.) (3–4 p)	Catanzaro	Novara
19:00 CEST (UTC+2)	Chajia 32', 56'	Report	Carlini 52'; Verna 88'	Stadium: Stadio Silvio Piola; Attendance: 346; Referee: Matteo Marcenaro
	Penalties
	Gabrielloni (penalty scored); Kabashi (penalty scored); Walker (penalty scored); Dkidak (penalty missed); Bellemo (penalty missed)		(penalty scored) Carlini; (penalty scored) Vandeputte; (penalty missed) Verna; (penalty scored) Bombagi; (penalty scored) Vázquez
