= 2023–24 Como 1907 season =

Como 1907
2023–24 season
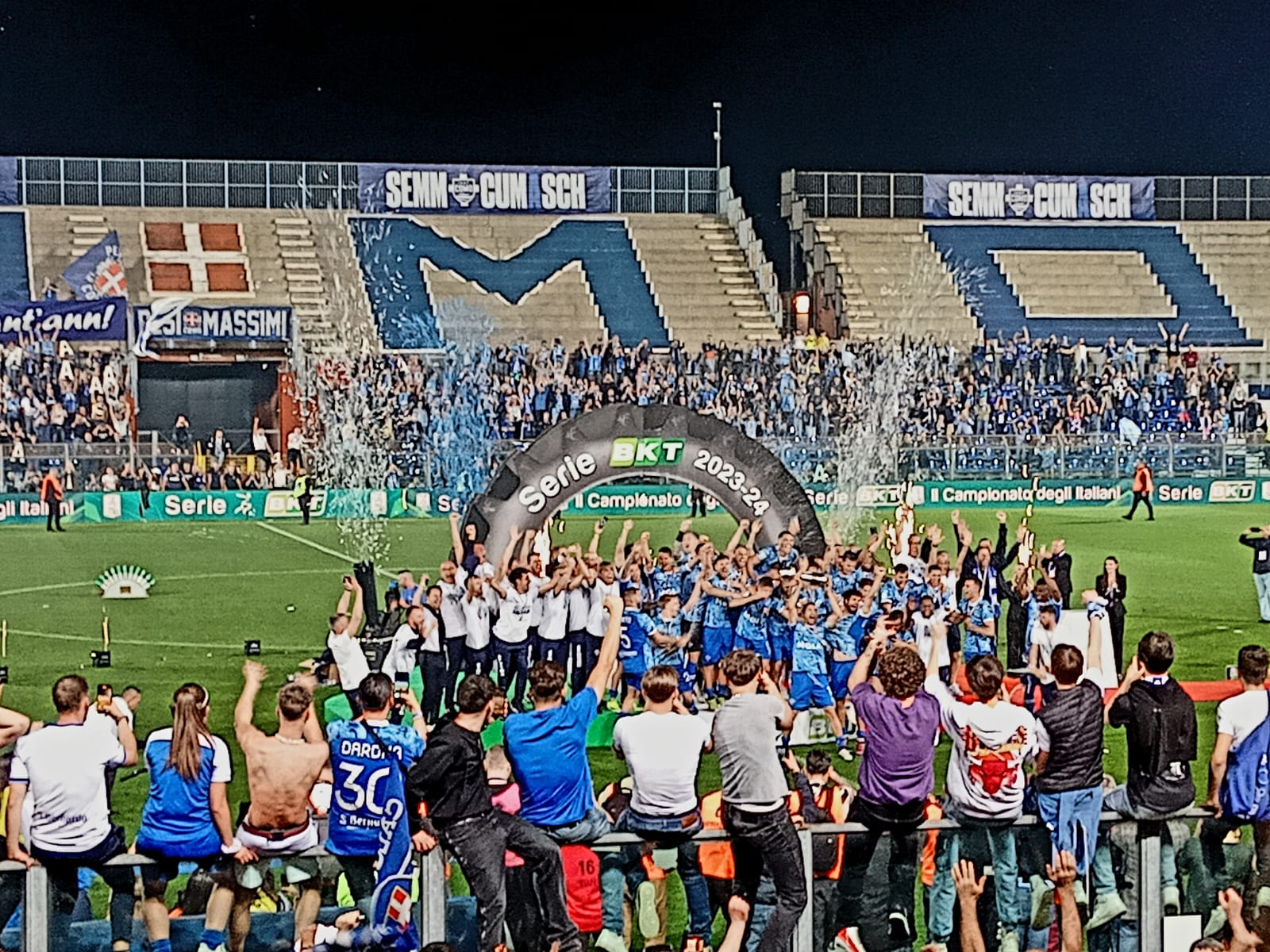
- Como 1907 players celebrating Serie A promotion after the game against Cosenza (10 May 2024).
- Owner: Djarum Group
- President: Dennis Wise
- Head coach: Moreno Longo (until 13 November); Osian Roberts (caretaker; since 21 December)
- Stadium: Stadio Giuseppe Sinigaglia
- Serie B: 2nd (promoted)
- Coppa Italia: Round of 64
- Top goalscorer: League: Patrick Cutrone (14); All: Patrick Cutrone (14)
colours	Away colours	Third colours

The 2023–24 season was Como 1907's 117th season in existence and the club's third consecutive season in the second division of Italian football. In addition to the domestic league, Como 1907 participated in this season's edition of the Coppa Italia. The season covered the period from 1 July 2023 to 30 June 2024.

With a 1-1 draw against Cosenza on 11 May 2024, Como secured promotion to the Serie A for the first time since 2003.

== Players ==
=== First-team squad ===
As of 25 August 2023

Note: Flags indicate national team as defined under FIFA eligibility rules; some limited exceptions apply. Players may hold more than one non-FIFA nationality.

No.	Pos.	Nation	Player
1	GK	CRO	Adrian Šemper
3	DF	ITA	Marco Sala
4	DF	ITA	Matteo Solini
5	DF	ITA	Marco Curto (on loan from Südtirol)
6	MF	ITA	Alessio Iovine
7	MF	BEL	Moutir Chajia
8	MF	ITA	Daniele Baselli
9	FW	ITA	Alessandro Gabrielloni
10	FW	ITA	Patrick Cutrone
11	MF	ESP	Álex Blanco
12	GK	ITA	Pierre Bolchini
14	MF	ITA	Alessandro Bellemo
20	FW	IRL	Liam Kerrigan
21	MF	ITA	Tommaso Arrigoni

No.	Pos.	Nation	Player
22	GK	ITA	Mauro Vigorito
23	DF	ITA	Filippo Scaglia
26	DF	NED	Cas Odenthal
27	FW	ITA	Alberto Cerri
28	MF	DEN	Oliver Abildgaard
33	MF	FRA	Lucas Da Cunha
44	DF	CYP	Nicholas Ioannou
71	MF	ITA	Paolo Faragò
80	DF	ITA	Luca Vignali
84	DF	ITA	Tommaso Cassandro
90	FW	ITA	Simone Verdi
93	DF	ITA	Federico Barba
94	MF	CIV	Ben Lhassine Kone (on loan from Torino)
99	FW	AUT	Marlon Mustapha

=== Out on loan ===
As of 20 July 2023

Note: Flags indicate national team as defined under FIFA eligibility rules; some limited exceptions apply. Players may hold more than one non-FIFA nationality.

No. / Pos. / Nation / Player; — / GK / ITA / Simone Ghidotti (at Avellino until 30 June 2024)	No. / Pos. / Nation / Player; — / MF / ITA / Marco Tremolada (at Renate until 30 June 2024)

== Transfers ==
=== In ===
Pos.	Player	Transferred from	Fee	Date	Source
FW	(Italy) Alberto Cerri	(Italy) Cagliari	€2,000,000	1 July 2023	
GK	(Italy) Mauro Vigorito	(Italy) Cosenza	Free	1 July 2023	
FW	(Austria) Marlon Mustapha	(Germany) Mainz 05	€900,000	12 July 2023	
MF	(Denmark) Oliver Abildgaard	(Russia) Rubin Kazan	Free	12 July 2023	
GK	(Croatia) Adrian Semper	(Italy) Genoa	Undisclosed	12 July 2023	
DF	(Italy) Tommaso Cassandro	(Italy) Lecce	€500,000	13 July 2023	
DF	(Italy) Federico Barba	(Italy) Pisa	€600,000	1 August 2023	
MF	(Italy) Simone Verdi	(Italy) Torino	Undisclosed	25 August 2023	

=== Out ===
Pos.	Player	Transferred to	Fee	Date	Source
MF	(Spain) Cesc Fàbregas	Retired		1 July 2023	
DF	(Italy) Filippo Delli Carri	(Italy) Padova	Undisclosed	1 July 2023	
GK	(Italy) Simone Ghidotti	(Italy) Avellino	Loan	12 July 2023	
DF	(Italy) Andrea Cagnano	(Italy) Südtirol	Undisclosed	18 July 2023	
MF	(Italy) Enrico Celeghin	(Italy) Triestina	Undisclosed	8 August 2023	
MF	(Senegal) Racine Ba	(Italy) Trapani	Free	15 September 2023	

== Pre-season and friendlies ==
Win Draw Loss Fixtures

22 March 2024 Friendly	Cádiz (Spain)	1–1	(Italy) Como	Puerto Real
11:00 UTC+1	Ramos 21'		Fumagalli 68'	Stadium: Ciudad Deportiva de El Rosal

== Competitions ==
=== Overview ===
Competition	First match	Last match	Starting round	Final position	Record							
Competition	First match	Last match	Starting round	Final position	Pld	W	D	L	GF	GA	GD	Win %
Serie B	20 August 2023	10 May 2024	Matchday 1	2nd	38	21	10	7	58	40	+18	55.26
Coppa Italia	13 August 2023		Round of 64	Round of 64	1	0	0	1	0	1	−1	0.00
Total					39	21	10	8	58	41	+17	53.85

Source: Competitions

=== Serie B ===
==== League table ====
Pos	Team	Pld	W	D	L	GF	GA	GD	Pts	Promotion, qualification or relegation
1	Parma (C, P)	38	21	13	4	66	35	+31	76	Promotion to Serie A
2	Como (P)	38	21	10	7	58	40	+18	73	Promotion to Serie A
3	Venezia (O, P)	38	21	7	10	69	46	+23	70	Qualification for promotion play-offs semi-finals
4	Cremonese	38	19	10	9	50	32	+18	67	Qualification for promotion play-offs semi-finals
5	Catanzaro	38	17	9	12	59	50	+9	60	Qualification for promotion play-offs preliminary round

Source: Soccerway (in English)
Rules for classification: 1) Points; 2) Head-to-head points; 3) Head-to-head goal difference; 4) Goal difference; 5) Goals scored; 6) Draw.
(Note: Head-to-head record is used only after all the matches between the teams in question have been played)
(C) Champions; (O) Play-off winners; (P) Promoted

==== Results summary ====
Overall								Home						Away					
Pld	W	D	L	GF	GA	GD	Pts	W	D	L	GF	GA	GD	W	D	L	GF	GA	GD
38	21	10	7	58	40	+18	73	12	5	2	32	19	+13	9	5	5	26	21	+5

Source: Worldfootball

==== Results by round ====
Round	1	2	3	4	5	6	7	8	9	10	11	12	13	14	15	16	17	18	19	20	21	22	23	24	25	26	27	28	29	30	31	32	33	34	35	36	37	38
Ground	A	H	H	A	H	A	H	A	H	A	H	A	A	H	A	H	A	H	A	H	A	H	A	H	A	H	A	H	A	H	H	A	H	A	A	H	A	H
Result	L	D	D	W	W	W	W	D	L	L	W	D	W	W	W	W	L	D	W	W	D	L	W	W	L	D	W	W	L	W	W	W	W	W	D	W	D	D
Position	19	16	15	11	8	5	4	4	5	6	6	7	5	4	3	3	3	5	3	3	2	4	3	3	5	5	4	3	4	4	2	2	2	2	2	2	2	2

Source: Worldfootball
A = Away; H = Home; W = Win; D = Draw; L = Loss

==== Matches ====
The league fixtures were unveiled on 11 July 2023.

20 August 2023 1	Venezia	3–0	Como	Venice
20:30 CEST (UTC+2)

26 August 2023 2	Como	2–2	Reggiana	Como
20:30 CEST (UTC+2)				Stadium: Stadio Giuseppe Sinigaglia

3 September 2023 4	Spezia	0–1	Como	La Spezia
18:30 CEST (UTC+2)				Stadium: Stadio Alberto Picco

17 September 2023 5	Como	2–1	Ternana	Como
16:15 CEST (UTC+2)				Stadium: Stadio Giuseppe Sinigaglia

24 September 2023 6	Cittadella	0–3	Como	Cittadella
16:15 CEST (UTC+2)				Stadium: Stadio Pier Cesare Tombolato

27 September 2023 7	Como	1–0	Sampdoria	Como
20:30 CEST (UTC+2)				Stadium: Stadio Giuseppe Sinigaglia

1 October 2023 8	Bari	1–1	Como	Bari
16:15 CEST (UTC+2)				Stadium: Stadio San Nicola

8 October 2023 9	Como	1–3	Cremonese	Como
16:15 CEST (UTC+2)				Stadium: Stadio Giuseppe Sinigaglia

20 October 2023 10	Parma	2–1	Como	Parma
20:30 CEST (UTC+2)				Stadium: Stadio Ennio Tardini

28 October 2023 11	Como	1–0	Catanzaro	Como
14:00 CEST (UTC+2)	Verdi 7' (pen.)			Stadium: Stadio Giuseppe Sinigaglia

4 November 2023 12	Pisa	1–1	Como	Pisa
14:00 CET (UTC+1)	Valoti 46'		Cutrone 12'	Stadium: Arena Garibaldi

11 November 2023 13	Ascoli	0–1	Como	Ascoli Piceno
14:00 CET (UTC+1)			Cutrone 4'	Stadium: Stadio Cino e Lillo Del Duca

25 November 2023 14	Como	2–1	Feralpisalò	Como
14:00 CET (UTC+1)	Da Cunha 3'; Alessandro Gabrielloni 90+3'		Compagnon 52'	Stadium: Stadio Giuseppe Sinigaglia

28 November 2023 3	Como	0–0	Lecco	Como
18:30 CET (UTC+1)	Kone (yellow card) 69'; Gabrielloni (yellow card) 83'	Report	Bianconi (yellow card) 66'; Sersanti (yellow card) 77'; Crociata (yellow card) 80'	Stadium: Stadio Giuseppe Sinigaglia; Attendance: 5,847; Referee: (Italy) Antonio Rapuano

3 December 2023 15	Südtirol	0–1	Como	Bolzano
16:15 CET (UTC+1)	Masiello (yellow card) 90+1'	Report	Curto (yellow card) 29'; Verdi (yellow card) 35'; Abildgaard 73'; Kone (yellow card) 73'	Stadium: Stadio Druso; Attendance: 3,169; Referee: (Italy) Davide Di Marco

10 December 2023 16	Como	2–1	Modena	Como
16:15 CET (UTC+1)	Da Cunha (yellow card) 32'; Verdi 42' (pen.); Gabrielloni 87'; Barba (red card) 90+8'	Report	Duca (yellow card) 51'; Zaro 56'; Bozhanaj (yellow card) 70'; Pio Riccio (yellow card) 83'; Strizzolo (yellow card) 88'	Stadium: Stadio Giuseppe Sinigaglia; Attendance: 4,652; Referee: (Italy) Giacomo Camplone

16 December 2023 17	Brescia	2–0	Como	Brescia
14:00 CET (UTC+1)	Jallow (yellow card) 40'; Borrelli 60'; Moncini 72'; Adorni (yellow card) 81'	Report	Baselli (yellow card) 90+8'; Gabrielloni (yellow card) 90+9'	Stadium: Stadio Mario Rigamonti; Attendance: 4,640; Referee: (Italy) Daniele Doveri

23 December 2023 18	Como	3–3	Palermo	Como
14:00 CET (UTC+1)	Sala (yellow card) 41'; Cutrone 46' (yellow card) 66'; Gabrielloni 58'; Curto (yellow card) 67'; Da Cunha (yellow card) 81'; Verdi 90+2' (pen.)	Report	Di Francesco 17'; Nedelcearu (yellow card) 48'; Marconi (yellow card) 53' (red card) 90+1'; Segre 63'; Graves 82'	Stadium: Stadio Giuseppe Sinigaglia; Attendance: 6,362; Referee: (Italy) Luca Pairetto

26 December 2023 19	Cosenza	1–2	Como	Cosenza
15:00 CET (UTC+1)	Tutino 23'; Micai (yellow card) 29'; Fontanarosa (yellow card) 48'; D'Orazio (yellow card) 84'	Report	Cutrone 39'; Verdi 50'; Fabio Rispoli (yellow card) 83'; Arrigoni (yellow card) 88'	Stadium: Stadio San Vito-Gigi Marulla; Attendance: 8,752; Referee: (Italy) Davide Di Marco

13 January 2024 20	Como	4–0	Spezia	Como
14:00 CET (UTC+1)				Stadium: Stadio Giuseppe Sinigaglia

20 January 2024 21	Reggiana	2–2	Como	Reggio Emilia
14:00 CET (UTC+1)				Stadium: Mapei Stadium – Città del Tricolore

27 January 2024 22	Como	0–2	Ascoli	Como
14:00 CET (UTC+1)				Stadium: Stadio Giuseppe Sinigaglia

3 February 2024 23	Ternana	0–1	Como	Terni
16:15 CET (UTC+1)	Pyyhtiä (yellow card) 56'	Report	Gabriel Strefezza 40' (yellow card) 67'; Goldaniga (yellow card) 85'	Stadium: Stadio Libero Liberati; Attendance: 4,969; Referee: (Italy) Manuel Volpi

9 February 2024 24	Como	1–0	Brescia	Como
20:30 CET (UTC+1)	Gabriel Strefezza 7'; Curto (yellow card) 52'; Iovine (yellow card) 90+5'	Report	Olzer (yellow card) 23'; Paghera (yellow card) 36'; Borrelli (yellow card) 70'; Galazzi (yellow card) 87'	Stadium: Stadio Giuseppe Sinigaglia; Attendance: 5,387; Referee: (Italy) Daniele Rutella

17 February 2024 25	Palermo	3–0	Como	Palermo
16:15 CET (UTC+1)	Brunori 35'; Ranocchia 64'; Di Mariano (yellow card) 67'; Di Francesco 83'	Report	Bellemo (yellow card) 12'; Curto (yellow card) 55'; Ballet (yellow card) 88'	Stadium: Stadio Renzo Barbera; Attendance: 31,211; Referee: (Italy) Gianluca Aureliano

24 February 2024 26	Como	1–1	Parma	Como
16:15 CET (UTC+1)	Verdi 24'; Da Cunha (yellow card) 40'; Goldaniga (yellow card) 87'	Report	Benedyczak 3'; Estévez (yellow card) 89'; Hernani (yellow card) 90'	Stadium: Stadio Giuseppe Sinigaglia; Attendance: 7,226; Referee: (Italy) Daniele Chiffi

27 February 2024 27	Lecco	0–3	Como	Lecco
20:30 CET (UTC+1)	Guglielmotti (yellow card) 7'; Alessandro Caporale (yellow card) 48'	Report	Goldaniga 3'; Bellemo 21'; Abildgaard 90+2'	Stadium: Stadio Rigamonti-Ceppi; Attendance: 4,982; Referee: (Italy) Ermanno Feliciani

3 March 2024 28	Como	2–1	Venezia	Como
16:15 CET (UTC+1)	Verdi 38' (yellow card) 49'; Cutrone 90'	Report	Pohjanpalo 40'; Candela (yellow card) 75'; Šverko (yellow card) 88'	Stadium: Stadio Giuseppe Sinigaglia; Attendance: 6,744; Referee: (Italy) Luca Zufferli

9 March 2024 29	Cremonese	2–1	Como	Cremona
16:15 CET (UTC+1)	Coda 45' (pen.) (yellow card) 66'; Castagnetti (yellow card) 64'; Zanimacchia 88'	Report	Gabriel Strefezza (red card) 14'; Da Cunha (yellow card) 31' (goal) 67'; Abildgaard (yellow card) 46'; Vigorito (red card) 70'; Goldaniga (yellow card) 90+4'	Stadium: Stadio Giovanni Zini; Attendance: 10,340; Referee: (Italy) Giacomo Camplone

16 March 2024 30	Como	3–1	Pisa	Como
14:00 CET (UTC+1)	Gabrielloni 2'; Bellemo 10'; Tommaso Fumagalli (yellow card) 72'; Odenthal (yellow card) 77'; Cutrone 79'; Šemper (yellow card) 86'; Chajia (yellow card) 87'	Report	Miguel Veloso (yellow card) 33'; Touré (yellow card) 45+2'; Barbieri 49'	Stadium: Stadio Giuseppe Sinigaglia; Attendance: 6,248; Referee: (Italy) Maria Sole Ferrieri Caputi

1 April 2024 31	Como	2–0	Südtirol	Como
15:00 CET (UTC+1)	Da Cunha 26'; Gabrielloni 48'; Bellemo (yellow card) 65'	Report	Silvio Merkaj (yellow card) 66'	Stadium: Stadio Giuseppe Sinigaglia; Attendance: 6,261; Referee: (Italy) Marco Piccinini

6 April 2024 32	Catanzaro	1–2	Como	Catanzaro
16:15 CET (UTC+1)	Vandeputte 19'; Matias Antonini (yellow card) 58'; D'Andrea (yellow card) 78'; Scognamillo (yellow card) 88'	Report	Odenthal (yellow card) 27'; Gabrielloni 62'; Da Cunha 67'	Stadium: Stadio Nicola Ceravolo; Attendance: 12,075; Referee: (Italy) Marco Di Bello

13 April 2024 33	Como	2–1	Bari	Como
14:00 CET (UTC+1)	Gabrielloni 38'; Iovine (yellow card) 42'; Da Cunha 60'	Report	Matino (yellow card) 21'; Bellomo (yellow card) 56'; Vicari (yellow card) 60'; Ahmad Benali (yellow card) 67'; Pucino (yellow card) 75'; Pușcaș 90'	Stadium: Stadio Giuseppe Sinigaglia; Attendance: 7,368; Referee: (Italy) Daniele Rutella

20 April 2024 34	Feralpisalò	2–5	Como	Piacenza
14:00 CET (UTC+1)	Felici 16'; Zennaro 45+1' (yellow card) 88'	Report	Cutrone 21' 39'; Barba 31'; Gabriel Strefezza 64'; Iovine (yellow card) 75'; Braunöder 86'	Stadium: Stadio Leonardo Garilli; Attendance: 2,438; Referee: (Italy) Alessandro Prontera

27 April 2024 35	Sampdoria	1–1	Como	Genoa
16:15 CET (UTC+1)	Depaoli (yellow card) 24'; Borini (yellow card) 53' (goal) 66'; Esposito (yellow card) 90+1'	Report	Gabriel Strefezza (yellow card) 61'; Braunöder (yellow card) 69'; Cutrone 82'	Stadium: Stadio Luigi Ferraris; Attendance: 24,783; Referee: (Italy) Giacomo Camplone

1 May 2024 36	Como	2–1	Cittadella	Como
15:00 CET (UTC+1)	Bellemo (yellow card) 53'; Verdi 73'; Nsame (yellow card) 90'; Goldaniga 90+4'; Cutrone (yellow card) 90+5'	Report	Pavan (yellow card) 25'; Magrassi (yellow card) 64'; Pittarello (yellow card) 71'; Kastrati (yellow card) 89'	Stadium: Stadio Giuseppe Sinigaglia; Attendance: 7,153; Referee: (Italy) Francesco Cosso

5 May 2024 37	Modena	0–0	Como	Modena
15:00 CEST (UTC+2)	Magnino (yellow card) 19'	Report	Goldaniga (yellow card) 23'	Stadium: Stadio Alberto Braglia; Attendance: 9,579; Referee: (Italy) Luca Zufferli

10 May 2024 38	Como	1–1	Cosenza	Como
20:30 CEST (UTC+2)	Iovine (yellow card) 53'; Verdi 74' (pen.)	Report	Tutino 30'; Micai (yellow card) 43'; Camporese (yellow card) 77'	Stadium: Stadio Giuseppe Sinigaglia; Referee: (Italy) Gianluca Manganiello

=== Coppa Italia ===
13 August 2023 Round of 64	Lecce	1–0	Como	Lecce
21:00 CEST (UTC+2)	Baschirotto (yellow card) 2'; Almqvist 27'; Dorgu (yellow card) 86'	Report	Cassandro (yellow card) 19'; Abildgaard (yellow card) 23'	Stadium: Stadio Via del mare Attendance: 14,174; Referee: Daniele Rutella
