= 2024–25 Como 1907 season =

Como 1907
2024–25 season
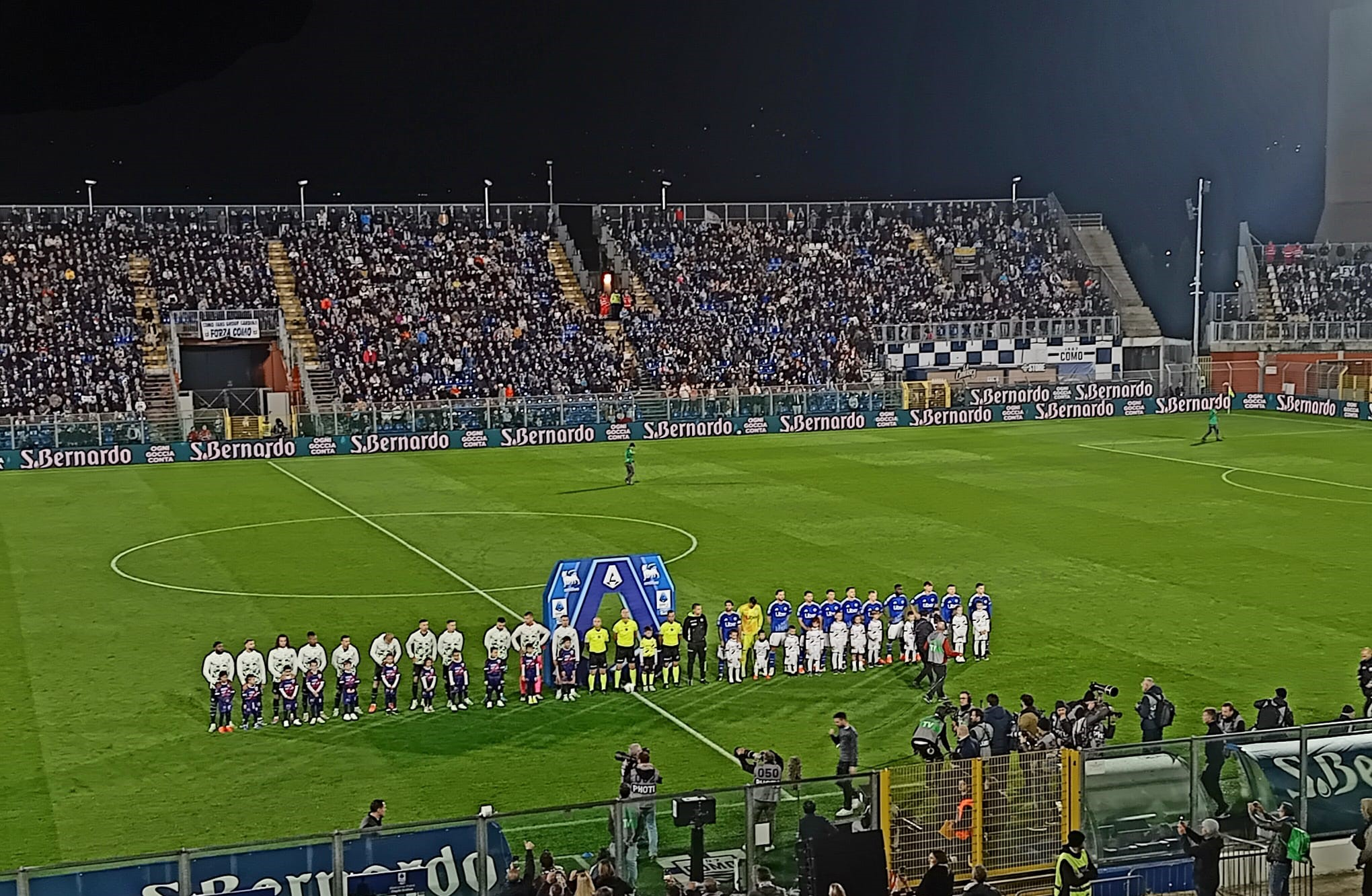
- Como 1907 and Lazio players on the pitch before the game on 31 October 2024
- Owner: Djarum Group
- President: Mirwan Suwarso
- Head coach: Cesc Fàbregas
- Stadium: Stadio Giuseppe Sinigaglia
- Serie A: 10th
- Coppa Italia: First round
- Top goalscorer: League: Assane Diao (8); All: Patrick Cutrone; Assane Diao (8 each)
- Highest home attendance: 13,602 vs Milan; 14 January 2025, Serie A
- Lowest home attendance: 9,566 vs Udinese; 20 January 2025, Serie A
- Average home league attendance: 10,576
- Biggest win: 4–1 vs Udinese (H) 20 January 2025, Serie A 3–0 vs Lecce (A) 19 April 2025, Serie A
- Biggest defeat: 1–5 vs Lazio (H) 31 October 2024, Serie A
Home colours	Away colours	Third colours

The 2024–25 season was Como 1907's 118th season in existence, and its first in the Serie A in 21 years. In addition to the domestic league, Como participated in this season's edition of the Coppa Italia. The season covered the period from 1 July 2024 to 30 June 2025.

On 27 April 2025, Como equalled its historical record of four consecutive Serie A victories, before breaking it six days later. The streak ended on 10 May 2025, after a total of six consecutive wins.

== Players ==
=== First-team squad ===
As of 10 February 2025

Note: Flags indicate national team as defined under FIFA eligibility rules; some limited exceptions apply. Players may hold more than one non-FIFA nationality.

No.	Pos.	Nation	Player
2	DF	GER	Marc-Oliver Kempf
5	DF	ITA	Edoardo Goldaniga
6	MF	ITA	Alessio Iovine (3rd captain)
7	MF	BRA	Gabriel Strefezza
9	FW	ITA	Alessandro Gabrielloni (captain)
10	FW	ITA	Patrick Cutrone (vice-captain)
11	FW	GRE	Anastasios Douvikas
12	GK	ITA	Pierre Bolchini
13	DF	ITA	Alberto Dossena
15	DF	ITA	Fellipe Jack (on loan from Palmeiras)
16	MF	GAM	Alieu Fadera
18	DF	ESP	Alberto Moreno
19	MF	FRA	Jonathan Ikoné (on loan from Fiorentina)
20	MF	ESP	Sergi Roberto
22	GK	ITA	Mauro Vigorito

No.	Pos.	Nation	Player
23	MF	ARG	Máximo Perrone (on loan from Manchester City)
25	GK	ESP	Pepe Reina
26	MF	GER	Yannik Engelhardt
27	MF	AUT	Matthias Braunöder
28	DF	CRO	Ivan Smolčić
30	GK	FRA	Jean Butez
31	DF	KOS	Mërgim Vojvoda
33	MF	FRA	Lucas Da Cunha
38	FW	SEN	Assane Diao
40	MF	ENG	Dele Alli
41	DF	ESP	Álex Valle (on loan from Barcelona)
77	DF	BEL	Ignace Van Der Brempt (on loan from Red Bull Salzburg)
79	MF	ARG	Nico Paz
80	MF	FRA	Maxence Caqueret
90	FW	ESP	Iván Azón

== Transfers ==
=== Summer window ===
Deals officialised beforehand were effective starting from 1 July 2024.

==== In ====
Date	Pos.	Player	Age	Moving from	Fee	Notes	Source
12 June 2024	MF	(Austria) Matthias Braunöder	22	Austria Vienna	€1,500,000	From loan to definitive purchase	
25 June 2024	FW	(Italy) Andrea Belotti	30	(Italy) Roma	€4,500,000		
29 June 2024	DF	(Italy) Alberto Dossena	25	(Italy) Cagliari	€8,000,000		
30 June 2024	DF	(Italy) Marco Curto	25	(Italy) Südtirol	Undisclosed	From loan to definitive purchase	
30 June 2024	MF	(Ivory Coast) Ben Lhassine Kone	24	(Italy) Torino	€1,500,000	From loan to definitive purchase	
30 June 2024	FW	(Brazil) Gabriel Strefezza	27	(Italy) Lecce	€5,000,000	From loan to definitive purchase	
18 July 2024	GK	(Spain) Pepe Reina	41	(Spain) Villarreal	Free		
19 July 2024	DF	(Spain) Alberto Moreno	32	(Spain) Villarreal	Free		
24 July 2024	FW	(Iraq) Ali Jasim	20	(Iraq) Al-Kahrabaa	Free		
28 July 2024	DF	(France) Raphaël Varane	31	(England) Manchester United	Free		
30 July 2024	FW	(Italy) Manuel Pisano	18	(Germany) Bayern Munich	€500,000	Joined Primavera squad	
30 July 2024	GK	(Italy) Emil Audero	27	(Italy) Sampdoria	€6,000,000		
1 August 2024	MF	(Germany) Yannik Engelhardt	23	(Germany) Fortuna Düsseldorf	€8,000,000		
14 August 2024	MF	(The Gambia) Alieu Fadera	22	(Belgium) Genk	€5,000,000		
23 August 2024	MF	(Spain) Sergi Roberto	32	(Spain) Barcelona	Free		
25 August 2024	MF	(Argentina) Nico Paz	19	(Spain) Real Madrid	€6,000,000		
28 August 2024	DF	(Germany) Marc-Oliver Kempf	29	(Germany) Hertha BSC	€2,500,000		

==== Loan returns ====
Date	Pos.	Player	Age	Moving from	Fee	Notes	Source
30 June 2024	FW	(Italy) Alberto Cerri	28	(Italy) Empoli	Free		

==== Loans in ====
Date	Pos.	Player	Age	Moving from	Fee	Notes	Source
26 July 2024	MF	(Italy) Luca Mazzitelli	28	(Italy) Frosinone	Undisclosed	With obligation to buy	
25 August 2024	MF	(Argentina) Máximo Perrone	21	(England) Manchester City	Free		
30 August 2024	DF	(Belgium) Ignace Van Der Brempt	22	(Austria) Red Bull Salzburg	Undisclosed		

Total spending: ▼€47.5M

==== Out ====
Date	Pos.	Player	Age	Moving to	Fee	Notes	Source
26 June 2024	DF	(Italy) Luca Vignali	28	(Italy) Spezia	Undisclosed	From loan to definitive purchase	
30 June 2024	DF	(Italy) Matteo Solini	31	(Italy) Mantova	Undisclosed		
30 June 2024	MF	(Italy) Tommaso Arrigoni	30	(Italy) Südtirol	Undisclosed	From loan to definitive purchase	
30 June 2024	GK	(Croatia) Adrian Šemper	26	(Italy) Pisa	€2,500,000		
30 June 2024	DF	(Netherlands) Cas Odenthal	23	(Italy) Sassuolo	€1,200,000		
25 September 2024	DF	(France) Raphaël Varane	31	Unattached	Free	Retired	

==== Loans out ====
Date	Pos.	Player	Age	Moving to	Fee	Notes	Source
19 June 2024	FW	(Cameroon) Jean-Pierre Nsame	31	(Poland) Legia Warsaw	Free		
9 July 2024	MF	(Italy) Marco Tremolada	20	(Italy) Lumezzane	Free	After return from loan	
16 July 2024	DF	(Italy) Diego Ronco	19	(Italy) Virtus Verona	Free	Loan extended	
23 July 2024	DF	(Italy) Marco Curto	25	(Italy) Cesena	Free		
23 July 2024	FW	(Italy) Tommaso Fumagalli	24	(Italy) Cosenza	Free		
25 July 2024	FW	(Austria) Marlon Mustapha	23	(Germany) Greuther Fürth	Free	After return from loan	
1 August 2024	GK	(Italy) Simone Ghidotti	24	(Italy) Sampdoria	Free	After return from loan	
1 August 2024	DF	(Cyprus) Nicholas Ioannou	28	(Italy) Sampdoria	Free		
1 August 2024	MF	(Italy) Alessandro Bellemo	28	(Italy) Sampdoria	Free		
14 August 2024	FW	(United States) Nicholas Gioacchini	24	(United States) Cincinnati	Free		
16 August 2024	MF	(Italy) Fabio Rispoli	17	(Italy) Virtus Verona	Free		
21 August 2024	DF	(Italy) Tommaso Cassandro	24	(Italy) Catanzaro	Free		
30 August 2024	MF	(Denmark) Oliver Abildgaard	28	(Italy) Pisa	Free		
31 August 2024	MF	(Switzerland) Samuel Ballet	23	(Switzerland) Zürich	Free		
31 August 2024	FW	(Republic of Ireland) Liam Kerrigan	24	(Belgium) Beveren	Free	After return from loan	
4 September 2024	DF	(Slovakia) Peter Kováčik	22	(Poland) Jagiellonia Białystok	Free	After return from loan	

Total income: ▲€3.7M

=== Winter window ===
Deals officialised beforehand will be effective starting from 2 January 2025.

==== In ====
Date	Pos.	Player	Age	Moving from	Fee	Notes	Source
7 January 2025	GK	(France) Jean Butez	29	(Belgium) Antwerp	€2,000,000		
7 January 2025	FW	(Senegal) Assane Diao	19	(Spain) Real Betis	€12,000,000		
12 January 2025	MF	(France) Maxence Caqueret	24	(France) Lyon	€17,000,000		
19 January 2025	MF	(England) Dele Alli	28	Unattached	Free		
3 February 2025	DF	(Croatia) Ivan Smolčić	24	(Croatia) Rijeka	€1,600,000		
3 February 2025	DF	(Kosovo) Mërgim Vojvoda	30	(Italy) Torino	€2,500,000		
3 February 2025	FW	(Spain) Iván Azón	22	(Spain) Real Zaragoza	Undisclosed		
3 February 2025	FW	(Greece) Anastasios Douvikas	25	(Spain) Celta Vigo	€13,000,000		

==== Loans in ====
Date	Pos.	Player	Age	Moving from	Fee	Notes	Source
31 January 2025	FW	(France) Jonathan Ikoné	26	(Italy) Fiorentina	€1,000,000	With option to buy	
31 January 2025	DF	(Spain) Álex Valle	20	(Spain) Barcelona	Undisclosed		

==== Out ====
Date	Pos.	Player	Age	Moving to	Fee	Notes	Source
17 January 2025	DF	(Italy) Federico Barba	31	(Switzerland) Sion	Undisclosed		
27 January 2025	FW	(United States) Nicholas Gioacchini	24	(Greece) Asteras Tripolis	Undisclosed	After return from loan	
30 January 2025	FW	(Cameroon) Jean-Pierre Nsame	31	(Poland) Legia Warsaw	Undisclosed	From loan to definitive purchase	
4 February 2025	MF	(Italy) Daniele Baselli	32	Unattached	Free		
4 February 2025	MF	(Belgium) Moutir Chajia	26	(Georgia (country)) Dinamo Batumi	Free		

==== Loans out ====
Date	Pos.	Player	Age	Moving to	Fee	Notes	Source
7 January 2025	FW	(Italy) Alberto Cerri	28	(Italy) Salernitana	Free		
24 January 2025	DF	(Italy) Marco Curto	26	(Italy) Sampdoria	Free	After return from loan	
28 January 2025	FW	(Iraq) Ali Jasim	21	(Netherlands) Almere City	Free		
3 February 2025	DF	(Italy) Marco Sala	25	(Italy) Lecce	Free		
3 February 2025	GK	(Italy) Emil Audero	28	(Italy) Palermo	Undisclosed		
3 February 2025	FW	(Italy) Andrea Belotti	31	(Portugal) Benfica	Undisclosed		
3 February 2025	FW	(Italy) Simone Verdi	32	(Italy) Sassuolo	Undisclosed		
3 February 2025	MF	(Ivory Coast) Ben Lhassine Kone	24	(Italy) Frosinone	Undisclosed		
3 February 2025	MF	(Italy) Luca Mazzitelli	29	(Italy) Sassuolo	Free		
5 February 2025	FW	(Austria) Marlon Mustapha	23	(Austria) Rheindorf Altach	Undisclosed	After return from loan	
6 February 2025	DF	(Slovakia) Peter Kováčik	23	(Slovakia) Podbrezová	Free	After return from loan	

== Pre-season and friendlies ==
Win Draw Loss Fixtures

15 July 2024 Friendly	Wolverhampton Wanderers (England)	1–0	(Italy) Como	Marbella, Spain
	Doherty 61'	Report		Stadium: Marbella Football Centre
Note: Match abandoned in 78th minute.

20 July 2024 Friendly	Las Palmas (Spain)	1–2	(Italy) Como	Marbella, Spain
10:30	Cédric 4'	Report	Cutrone 50'; Strefezza 51'	Stadium: Marbella Football Center

25 July 2024 Friendly	Como (Italy)	3–1	(Italy) Cagliari	Châtillon
17:00	Cutrone 12'; Belotti 21'; Gabrielloni 71'	Report	Deiola 45+1'	Stadium: Stadio Brunod

29 July 2024 Friendly	Al-Hilal (Saudi Arabia)	1–0	(Italy) Como	Bad Kleinkirchheim, Austria
	Mitrović 63'	Report		Stadium: SportArena

3 August 2024 Friendly	VfL Wolfsburg (Germany)	0–0	(Italy) Como	Irdning, Austria
15:30		Report		Stadium: ATV-Riesneralm-Arena

== Competitions ==
=== Overall record ===
Competition	First match	Last match	Starting round	Final position	Record							
Competition	First match	Last match	Starting round	Final position	Pld	W	D	L	GF	GA	GD	Win %
Serie A	17 August 2024	23 May 2025	Matchday 1	10th	38	13	10	15	49	52	−3	34.21
Coppa Italia	11 August 2024		First round	First round	1	0	1	0	1	1	+0	0.00
Total					39	13	11	15	50	53	−3	33.33

Source: Soccerway

=== Serie A ===
==== League table ====
Pos	Team	Pld	W	D	L	GF	GA	GD	Pts	Qualification or relegation
8	Milan	38	18	9	11	61	43	+18	63	
9	Bologna	38	16	14	8	57	47	+10	62	Qualification for the Europa League league phase (Note: Bologna qualified for the Europa League league stage as the winners of the 2024–25 Coppa Italia.)
10	Como	38	13	10	15	49	52	−3	49	
11	Torino	38	10	14	14	39	45	−6	44 (Note: Torino finished ahead of Udinese on head-to-head points: Udinese 2–2 Torino, Torino 2–0 Udinese.)	
12	Udinese	38	12	8	18	41	56	−15	44	

Source: Serie A
Rules for classification: 1) Points; 2) Tiebreaker for Champions team and third relegated team; 3) Head-to-head points; 4) Head-to-head goal difference; 5) Goal difference; 6) Goals scored; 7) Draw.
(Note: Head-to-head record is used only after all the matches between the teams in question have been played)

==== Results summary ====
Overall								Home						Away					
Pld	W	D	L	GF	GA	GD	Pts	W	D	L	GF	GA	GD	W	D	L	GF	GA	GD
38	13	10	15	49	52	−3	49	8	5	6	28	26	+2	5	5	9	21	26	−5

Source: Soccerway

==== Results by round ====
Round	1	2	3	4	5	6	7	8	9	10	11	12	13	14	15	16	17	18	19	20	21	22	23	24	25	26	27	28	29	30	31	32	33	34	35	36	37	38
Ground	A	A	A	H	A	H	A	H	A	H	A	A	H	H	A	H	A	H	H	A	H	H	A	H	A	H	A	H	A	H	A	H	A	H	A	H	A	H
Result	L	D	L	D	W	W	L	D	L	L	L	D	L	D	D	W	L	W	L	D	W	L	L	L	W	W	L	D	L	D	W	W	W	W	W	W	D	L
Position	18	19	20	18	15	10	14	14	13	15	15	15	18	18	17	16	16	14	16	15	13	13	15	16	13	13	13	13	13	13	13	13	13	11	10	10	10	10
Points	0	1	1	2	5	8	8	9	9	9	9	10	10	11	12	15	15	18	18	19	22	22	22	22	25	28	28	29	29	30	33	36	39	42	45	48	49	49

Source: Serie A
A = Away; H = Home; W = Win; D = Draw; L = Loss; P = Postponed

==== Matches ====
The league fixtures were released on 4 July 2024.

Win Draw Loss Fixtures

19 August 2024 1	Juventus	3–0	Como	Turin
20:45 CEST	Mbangula 23'; Weah 45+1'; Locatelli (yellow card) 58'; Cambiaso (yellow card) 88', (goal) 90+1'	Report	Sala (yellow card) 9'; Engelhardt (yellow card) 33'; Verdi (yellow card) 72'; Goldaniga (yellow card) 76'	Stadium: Juventus Stadium; Attendance: 40,696; Referee: Matteo Marcenaro

26 August 2024 2	Cagliari	1–1	Como	Cagliari
18:30 CEST	Prati (yellow card) 17'; Piccoli 44'; Marin (yellow card) 63'	Report	Braunöder (yellow card) 12'; Moreno (yellow card) 41'; Cutrone 53'	Stadium: Unipol Domus; Attendance: 16,365; Referee: Marco Di Bello

1 September 2024 3	Udinese	1–0	Como	Udine
20:45 CEST	Brenner 43'; Bijol (yellow card) 68'; Zemura (yellow card) 90+1'; Bravo (yellow card) 90+9'	Report	Cutrone (penalty missed) 90+5'	Stadium: Stadio Friuli; Attendance: 20,804; Referee: Alessandro Prontera

14 September 2024 4	Como	2–2	Bologna	Como
15:00 CEST	Casale 5' (o.g.); Iovine (yellow card) 45'; Moreno (yellow card) 45+4'; Cutrone 53'	Report	Pobega (yellow card) 72'; Castro 76'; Iling-Junior 90+1'	Stadium: Stadio Giuseppe Sinigaglia; Attendance: 10,584; Referee: Marco Piccinini

24 September 2024 5	Atalanta	2–3	Como	Bergamo
20:45 CEST	Zappacosta 18'; De Roon (yellow card) 83'; Lookman 90+9' (pen.)	Report	Roberto (yellow card) 11'; Moreno (yellow card) 38'; Strefezza 46'; Kolašinac 54' (o.g.); Fadera 58'; Van Der Brempt (yellow card) 90+1'	Stadium: Stadio Atleti Azzurri d'Italia; Attendance: 22,977; Referee: Paride Tremolada

29 September 2024 6	Como	3–2	Hellas Verona	Como
15:00 CEST	Cutrone 43', 72'; Roberto (yellow card) 51'; Perrone (yellow card) 81'; Belotti 89'	Report	Belahyane (yellow card) 48'; Lazović 53' (pen.); Suslov (yellow card) 61' (yellow-red card) 64'; Coppola (yellow card) 75'; Mosquera (yellow card) 84'; Lambourde 90+4'	Stadium: Stadio Giuseppe Sinigaglia; Attendance: 10,740; Referee: Antonio Giua

4 October 2024 7	Napoli	3–1	Como	Naples
18:30 CEST	McTominay 1'; Lukaku 53' (pen.); Buongiorno (yellow card) 59'; Neres 86'	Report	Strefezza 43', (yellow card) 59'	Stadium: Stadio Diego Armando Maradona; Attendance: 50,000; Referee: Ermanno Feliciani

19 October 2024 8	Como	1–1	Parma	Como
15:00 CEST	Paz 45'; S.Roberto (yellow card) 59'	Report	Bonny 20'; Sohm (yellow card) 31'; Mihăilă (yellow card) 67'	Stadium: Stadio Giuseppe Sinigaglia; Attendance: 10,114; Referee: Michael Fabbri

25 October 2024 9	Torino	1–0	Como	Turin
20:45 CEST	Linetty (yellow card) 32'; Masina (yellow card) 32'; Vojvoda (yellow card) 64'; Njie 75'	Report	Strefezza (yellow card) 3'; Goldaniga (yellow card) 36'; Paz (yellow card) 73'	Stadium: Stadio Olimpico Grande Torino; Attendance: 23,571; Referee: Giovanni Ayroldi

31 October 2024 10	Como	1–5	Lazio	Como
19:45 CEST	Braunöder (yellow card) 45+2' (yellow-red card) 62'; Mazzitelli 53'	Report	Castellanos 28' (pen.), 81', (yellow card) 35'; Pedro 31'; Vecino (yellow card) 45'; Tavares (yellow card) 57' (yellow-red card) 65'; Isaksen (yellow card) 63'; Patric 72'; Tchaouna 90+5'	Stadium: Stadio Giuseppe Sinigaglia; Attendance: 10,750; Referee: Luca Pairetto

4 November 2024 11	Empoli	1–0	Como	Empoli
18:30 CEST	Pellegri 47'; Cacace (yellow card) 90+1'	Report		Stadium: Stadio Carlo Castellani; Attendance: 8,102; Referee: Marco Di Bello

7 November 2024 12	Genoa	1–1	Como	Genoa
20:45 CEST	Martín (yellow card) 32'; Vogliacco (yellow card) 61'; Balotelli (yellow card) 79'; Vásquez (yellow card) 86'; Vogliacco 90+2'	Report	Da Cunha 17'; Goldaniga (yellow card) 61'; Moreno (yellow card) 73'; Kempf (yellow card) 79'	Stadium: Stadio Marassi; Attendance: 30,708; Referee: Antonio Rapuano

24 November 2024 13	Como	0–2	Fiorentina	Como
15:00 CEST	Paz (yellow card) 29'; Dossena (yellow card) 88' (yellow-red card) 90+2'	Report	Adli 19'; Beltrán (yellow card) 58'; Kean 68'	Stadium: Stadio Giuseppe Sinigaglia; Attendance: 10,250; Referee: Matteo Marchetti

30 November 2024 14	Como	1–1	Monza	Como
15:00 CEST	Engelhardt 36'; Paz (yellow card) 44'; Sala (yellow card) 83'; Iovine (yellow card) 90+2'	Report	Caprari 54'	Stadium: Stadio Giuseppe Sinigaglia; Attendance: 9,749; Referee: Juan Luca Sacchi

8 December 2024 15	Venezia	2–2	Como	Venice
18:00 CEST	Nicolussi Caviglia 16'; Caviglia (yellow card) 39'; Oristanio 69'	Report	Candela 49' (o.g.); Belotti 56'; Sala (yellow card) 75'	Stadium: Stadio Pier Luigi Penzo; Attendance: 8,026; Referee: Daniele Doveri

15 December 2024 16	Como	2–0	Roma	Como
18:00 CET (UTC+1)	Goldaniga (yellow card) 45+1'; Belotti (yellow card) 61'; Van Der Brempt (yellow card) 68'; Da Cunha (yellow card) 78'; Kone (yellow card) 90'; Gabrielloni 90+3', (yellow card) 90+6'; Paz 90+7'	Report	Le Fée (yellow card) 55'	Stadium: Stadio Giuseppe Sinigaglia; Attendance: 10,376; Referee: Antonio Rapuano

23 December 2024 17	Internazionale	2–0	Como	Milan
20:45 CET (UTC+1)	Bisseck (yellow card) 24'; Carlos Augusto 48'; Thuram 90+2', (yellow card) 90+2'	Report	Da Cunha (yellow card) 64'; Mazzitelli (yellow card) 87'	Stadium: San Siro; Attendance: 73,204; Referee: Antonio Giua

30 December 2024 18	Como	2–0	Lecce	Como
18:30 CET (UTC+1)	Van Der Brempt (yellow card) 24'; Paz (penalty missed) 31', 49'; Goldaniga (yellow card) 66'; Engelhardt (yellow card) 76'; Cutrone 79'	Report	Coulibaly (yellow card) 56'; Pierotti (yellow card) 66'	Stadium: Stadio Giuseppe Sinigaglia; Attendance: 10,421; Referee: Marco Piccinini

10 January 2025 20	Lazio	1–1	Como	Rome
20:45 CET (UTC+1)	Dia 34'; Pellegrini (yellow card) 51'; Tchaouna (yellow card) 57' (yellow-red card) 58'; Rovella (yellow card) 63'	Report	Kempf (yellow card) 28'; Diao (yellow card) 63'; Cutrone 72'; Engelhardt (yellow card) 84'	Stadium: Stadio Olimpico; Attendance: 40,000; Referee: Paride Tremolada

14 January 2025 19	Como	1–2	Milan	Como
18:30 CET (UTC+1)	Diao 60'; Kempf (yellow card) 65'	Report	Morata (yellow card) 20'; Bennacer (yellow card) 33'; Thiaw (yellow card) 43'; Jiménez (yellow card) 53'; Musah (yellow card) 56'; Hernandez 71'; Leão 76', (yellow card) 85'	Stadium: Stadio Giuseppe Sinigaglia; Attendance: 13,602; Referee: Gianluca Manganiello
Note: The match was originally scheduled for 5 January 2025, but was postponed due to Milan's participation in the Supercoppa Italiana.

20 January 2025 21	Como	4–1	Udinese	Como
20:45	Diao 5'; Strefezza 44'; Goldaniga (yellow card) 51' (yellow-red card) 57'; Bijol 78' (o.g.); Paz 90'	Report	Payero 50'; Solet (yellow card) 79' (yellow-red card); Ekkelenkamp (yellow card) 81'; Bijol (yellow card) 83'	Stadium: Stadio Giuseppe Sinigaglia; Attendance: 9,566; Referee: Francesco Cosso

25 January 2025 22	Como	1–2	Atalanta	Como
15:00	Paz 30'; Jack (yellow card) 66'; Cutrone (yellow card) 90+3'	Report	Lookman (yellow card) 51'; Retegui 56', 70'; Brescianini (yellow card) 88'; Samardžić (yellow card) 90'	Stadium: Stadio Giuseppe Sinigaglia; Attendance: 10,366; Referee: Luca Pairetto

1 February 2025 23	Bologna	2–0	Como	Bologna
20:45	Lykogiannis (yellow card) 28'; De Silvestri 25'; Ndoye (yellow card) 47'; Fabbian 66'; Freuler (yellow card) 90+1'	Report	Perrone (yellow card) 9'; Fadera (yellow card) 38' (yellow-red card) 38'; Caqueret (yellow card) 45'; Diao (yellow card) 65'	Stadium: Stadio Renato Dall'Ara; Attendance: 26,492; Referee: Luca Massimi

7 February 2025 24	Como	1–2	Juventus	Como
20:45	Valle (yellow card) 37'; Diao 45+1'; Strefezza (yellow card) 75'; Goldaniga (yellow card) 86'	Report	Savona (yellow card) 28'; Kolo Muani 35', 89'	Stadium: Stadio Giuseppe Sinigaglia; Attendance: 10,475; Referee: Rosario Abisso

16 February 2025 25	Fiorentina	0–2	Como	Florence
12:30	Gosens (yellow card) 27'; Folorunsho (yellow card) 53'; Gudmundsson (yellow card) 64'	Report	Diao 41'; Goldaniga (yellow card) 52'; Perrone (yellow card) 57'; Paz 66'	Stadium: Stadio Artemio Franchi; Attendance: 19,000; Referee: Marco Piccinini

23 February 2025 26	Como	2–1	Napoli	Como
12:30	Rrahmani 7' (o.g.); Paz (yellow card) 24'; Diao 77'	Report	Raspadori 17'; Di Lorenzo (yellow card) 68'; McTominay (yellow card) 83'; Simeone (yellow card) 87'	Stadium: Stadio Giuseppe Sinigaglia; Attendance: 10,500; Referee: Gianluca Manganiello

2 March 2025 27	Roma	2–1	Como	Rome
18:00	Mancini (yellow card) 54'; Saelemaekers 61'; Cristante (yellow card) 69'; Dovbyk 76'	Report	Smolčić (yellow card) 12'; Kempf (yellow card) 27' (yellow-red card) 63'; Da Cunha 44', (yellow card) 86'; Caqueret (yellow card) 51'; Fadera (yellow card) 80'; Vojvoda (yellow card) 88'	Stadium: Stadio Olimpico; Attendance: 62,125; Referee: Luca Pairetto

8 March 2025 28	Como	1–1	Venezia	Como
15:00	Jack (yellow card) 34'; Ikoné 49'; Douvikas (yellow card) 79'	Report	Zerbin (yellow card) 2'; Duncan (yellow card) 8'; Yeboah (yellow card) 81'; Gytkjær 90+5'	Stadium: Stadio Giuseppe Sinigaglia; Attendance: 10,080; Referee: Giovanni Ayroldi

15 March 2025 29	Milan	2–1	Como	Milan
18:00	Bondo (yellow card) 10'; Pulisic 53'; Reijnders 75'; Musah (yellow card) 48'; Jiménez (yellow card) 79'	Report	Da Cunha 33'; Perrone (yellow card) 68'; Strefezza (yellow card) 79'; Paz (yellow card) 90'; Alli (red card) 90+1'	Stadium: San Siro; Attendance: 74,800; Referee: Matteo Marchetti

29 March 2025 30	Como	1–1	Empoli	Como
15:00	Goldaniga (yellow card) 25'; Roberto (yellow card) 30'; Douvikas 61'	Report	Goglichidze (yellow card) 12'; Pezzella (yellow card) 67'; Henderson (yellow card) 69'; Kouamé 75'; Grassi (yellow card) 83'; Gyasi (yellow card) 84'; Fazzini (red card) 90+2'	Stadium: Stadio Giuseppe Sinigaglia; Attendance: 10,118; Referee: Maurizio Mariani

5 April 2025 31	Monza	1–3	Como	Monza
15:00	Mota 5'; Kyriakopoulos (yellow card) 24'; Bianco (yellow card) 38'	Report	Ikoné 16'; Diao 39'; Vojvoda 51', (yellow card) 55'	Stadium: Stadio Brianteo; Attendance: 8,469; Referee: Giuseppe Collu

13 April 2025 32	Como	1–0	Torino	Como
15:00	Douvikas 38'	Report		Stadium: Stadio Giuseppe Sinigaglia; Attendance: 10,658; Referee: Matteo Marcenaro

19 April 2025 33	Lecce	0–3	Como	Lecce
15:00		Report	Diao 33', 90+1'; Goldaniga 84'	Stadium: Stadio Via del mare Attendance: 28,181; Referee: Simone Sozza

27 April 2025 34	Como	1–0	Genoa	Como
15:00	Strefezza 59'	Report		Stadium: Stadio Giuseppe Sinigaglia; Attendance: 13,602; Referee: Alberto Arena

3 May 2025 35	Parma	0–1	Como	Parma
15:00		Report	Strefezza 79'	Stadium: Stadio Ennio Tardini; Attendance: 20,132; Referee: Marco Di Bello

10 May 2025 36	Como	3–1	Cagliari	Como
15:00	Caqueret 40'; Strefezza 45+2'; Cutrone 72'	Report	Adopo 22'	Stadium: Stadio Giuseppe Sinigaglia; Attendance: 10,291; Referee: Francesco Forneau

18 May 2025 37	Hellas Verona	1–1	Como	Verona
20:45	Lazovic 69'	Report	Caqueret 29'	Stadium: Stadio Marcantonio Bentegodi; Attendance: 24,344; Referee: Rosario Abisso

23 May 2025 38	Como	0–2	Internazionale	Como
20:45	Reina (red card) 45'; Strefezza (yellow card) 45+1'	Report	Çalhanoğlu (yellow card) 12'; De Vrij 20', (yellow card) 47'; Zalewski (yellow card) 43'; Correa 51'	Stadium: Stadio Giuseppe Sinigaglia; Attendance: 10,656; Referee: Davide Massa

=== Coppa Italia ===
Win Draw Loss Fixtures

11 August 2024 First round	Sampdoria	1–1 (4–3 p)	Como	Genoa
20:45 CEST	Ioannou 37'	Report	Cutrone 44'; Da Cunha (yellow card) 71'; Verdi (yellow card) 89'; Iovine (yellow card) 90+1' (yellow-red card) 90+7'	Stadium: Stadio Luigi Ferraris; Attendance: 14,196; Referee: Giuseppe Collu
	Penalties
	Vieira (penalty scored); Benedetti (penalty scored); Meulensteen (penalty missed); Coda (penalty scored); Tutino (penalty scored)		(penalty scored) Da Cunha; (penalty missed) Verdi; (penalty missed) Braunöder; (penalty scored) Baselli; (penalty scored) Strefezza
Note: Field was reversed due to the inability of Como's stadium.

== Statistics ==
=== Appearances and goals ===
As of 24 May 2025

List includes all first team players and any other matchday squad players

No.	Pos	Nat	Player	Total		Serie A		Coppa Italia	
No.	Pos	Nat	Player	Apps	Goals	Apps	Goals	Apps	Goals
Goalkeepers
12	GK	(Italy) ITA	Pierre Bolchini	0	0	0	0	0	0
22	GK	(Italy) ITA	Mauro Vigorito	0	0	0	0	0	0
25	GK	(Spain) ESP	Pepe Reina	13	0	12	0	1	0
30	GK	(France) FRA	Jean Butez	19	0	18+1	0	0	0
Defenders
2	DF	(Germany) GER	Marc-Oliver Kempf	31	0	30+1	0	0	0
5	DF	(Italy) ITA	Edoardo Goldaniga	33	1	28+4	1	0+1	0
6	DF	(Italy) ITA	Alessio Iovine	11	0	3+7	0	1	0
13	DF	(Italy) ITA	Alberto Dossena	23	0	20+3	0	0	0
15	DF	(Italy) ITA	Fellipe Jack	7	0	1+6	0	0	0
18	DF	(Spain) ESP	Alberto Moreno	25	0	21+3	0	1	0
28	DF	(Croatia) CRO	Ivan Smolčić	9	0	7+2	0	0	0
31	DF	(Kosovo) KOS	Mërgim Vojvoda	29	1	20+8	1	1	0
41	DF	(Spain) ESP	Álex Valle	15	0	12+3	0	0	0
77	DF	(Belgium) BEL	Ignace Van Der Brempt	20	0	14+6	0	0	0
Midfielders
7	MF	(Brazil) BRA	Gabriel Strefezza	38	6	32+5	6	1	0
16	MF	(The Gambia) GAM	Alieu Fadera	28	1	20+8	1	0	0
20	MF	(Spain) ESP	Sergi Roberto	13	0	8+5	0	0	0
23	MF	(Argentina) ARG	Máximo Perrone	26	0	20+6	0	0	0
26	MF	(Germany) GER	Yannik Engelhardt	26	1	11+15	1	0	0
27	MF	(Austria) AUT	Matthias Braunöder	9	0	3+5	0	1	0
33	MF	(France) FRA	Lucas Da Cunha	37	3	30+6	3	1	0
40	MF	(England) ENG	Dele Alli	1	0	0+1	0	0	0
79	MF	(Argentina) ARG	Nico Paz	35	6	30+5	6	0	0
80	MF	(France) FRA	Maxence Caqueret	18	2	15+3	2	0	0
Forwards
9	FW	(Italy) ITA	Alessandro Gabrielloni	16	1	0+15	1	0+1	0
10	FW	(Italy) ITA	Patrick Cutrone	34	8	23+10	7	1	1
11	FW	(Greece) GRE	Anastasios Douvikas	13	2	6+7	2	0	0
19	FW	(France) FRA	Jonathan Ikoné	27	2	6+21	2	0	0
38	MF	(Senegal) SEN	Assane Diao	15	8	14+1	8	0	0
90	FW	(Spain) ESP	Iván Azón	0	0	0	0	0	0
Other
NN	NN		Own goals	0	5	0	5	0	0
Players transferred out during the season
1	GK	(Indonesia) IDN	Emil Audero	8	0	8	0	0	0
3	DF	(Italy) ITA	Marco Sala	9	0	3+5	0	0+1	0
4	MF	(Ivory Coast) CIV	Ben Lhassine Kone	4	0	0+4	0	0	0
8	MF	(Italy) ITA	Daniele Baselli	3	0	1+1	0	0+1	0
11	FW	(Italy) ITA	Andrea Belotti	18	2	7+10	2	1	0
14	FW	(Iraq) IRQ	Ali Jasim	2	0	0+2	0	0	0
17	FW	(Italy) ITA	Alberto Cerri	5	0	0+5	0	0	0
19	DF	(France) FRA	Raphaël Varane	1	0	0	0	1	0
23	FW	(United States) USA	Nicholas Gioacchini	0	0	0	0	0	0
28	MF	(Denmark) DEN	Oliver Abildgaard	1	0	0+1	0	0	0
36	MF	(Italy) ITA	Luca Mazzitelli	11	1	3+7	1	1	0
84	DF	(Italy) ITA	Tommaso Cassandro	0	0	0	0	0	0
90	FW	(Italy) ITA	Simone Verdi	10	0	0+9	0	0+1	0
93	DF	(Italy) ITA	Federico Barba	8	0	5+2	0	1	0
