= Alessio Iovine =

Italian footballer (born 1991)

Personal information
- Date of birth: 1 February 1991 (age 35)
- Place of birth: Como, Italy
- Height: 1.74 m (5 ft 9 in)
- Position: Midfielder

Senior career*
Years	Team	Apps	(Gls)
–2013	Olginatese		
2013–2014	Pergolettese	30	(0)
2014–2016	Renate	53	(6)
2016–2019	Giana Erminio	104	(10)
2019–2025	Como	148	(7)
- * Club domestic league appearances and goals

Alessio Iovine (born 1 February 1991) is an Italian former footballer who played as a midfielder.

== Club career ==
=== Como ===
In July 2019, Iovine moved to Serie C club Como. He made his league debut for the club on 25 August 2019 in a 2–0 victory over former club Pergolettese. He stayed with Como through their promotion to Serie B and then Serie A, making his debut in the top tier in the last season of his professional career at the age of 33.

== Career statistics ==
As of match played 23 May 2025

Appearances and goals by club, season and competition
Club	Season	League			National Cup		Other		Total	
Club	Season	Division	Apps	Goals	Apps	Goals	Apps	Goals	Apps	Goals
Pergolettese	2013–14	Serie C	30	0	1	0	—		31	0
Renate	2014–15	Serie C	36	6	3 (Note: Two appearances in Coppa Italia, one appearance in Coppa Italia Serie C)	0	—		39	6
Renate	2015–16	Serie C	17	0	2	1	—		19	1
Renate	Total		53	6	5	1	—		58	7
Giana Erminio	2016–17	Serie C	39	2	2	0	—		41	2
Giana Erminio	2017–18	Serie C	34	6	2 (Note: One appearance in Coppa Italia, one appearance in Coppa Italia Serie C)	0	—		36	6
Giana Erminio	2018–19	Serie C	31	2	0	0	—		31	2
Giana Erminio	Total		104	10	4	0	—		108	10
Como	2019–20	Serie C	26	3	1	0	—		27	3
Como	2020–21	Serie C	38	3	0	0	1 (Note: Appearance in Supercoppa di Serie C)	0	39	3
Como	2021–22	Serie B	30	1	1	0	—		31	1
Como	2022–23	Serie B	18	0	0	0	—		18	0
Como	2023–24	Serie B	26	0	0	0	—		26	0
Como	2024–25	Serie A	10	0	1	0	—		11	0
Como	Total		148	7	3	0	1	0	152	7
Career total			335	23	13	1	1	0	349	24

== Honours ==
Como

- Supercoppa di Serie C: 2020–21
