= Jacopo Da Riva =

Italian footballer (born 2000)

Personal information
- Date of birth: 27 October 2000 (age 26)
- Place of birth: Montebelluna, Italy
- Height: 1.87 m (6 ft 2 in)
- Position: Midfielder

Team information
- Current team: Al-Ittifaq
- Number: 40

Youth career
- –2014: Montebelluna
- 2014–2015: Pordenone
- 2015–2020: Atalanta

Senior career*
Years	Team	Apps	(Gls)
2020–2025	Atalanta	1	(0)
2020–2021	→ Vicenza (loan)	17	(3)
2021–2022	→ SPAL (loan)	25	(2)
2022–2023	→ Como (loan)	20	(1)
2023	→ Reggiana (loan)	3	(0)
2024	→ Atalanta U23	3	(0)
2024	→ Juve Stabia (loan)	0	(0)
2024–2025	→ Foggia (loan)	22	(0)
2025–	Al-Ittifaq	0	(0)
- * Club domestic league appearances and goals as of 27 April 2025

Jacopo Da Riva (born 27 October 2000) is an Italian professional footballer who plays as a midfielder for Al-Ittifaq.

== Club career ==
Da Riva joined the youth academy of Atalanta in 2015. On 1 August 2020, Da Riva made his senior debut for the club in a 2–0 Serie A loss to Inter Milan. Eleven days later, he made his debut in the UEFA Champions League against Paris Saint-Germain.

On 5 October 2020, he joined Serie B club Vicenza on loan.

On 24 August 2021, he joined SPAL on loan.

On 1 September 2022, Da Riva was loaned to Como.

On 1 September 2023, Da Riva moved on loan to Reggiana.

On 24 August 2024, he joined Foggia on loan.
