= Alessandro Bellemo =

Italian footballer (born 1995)

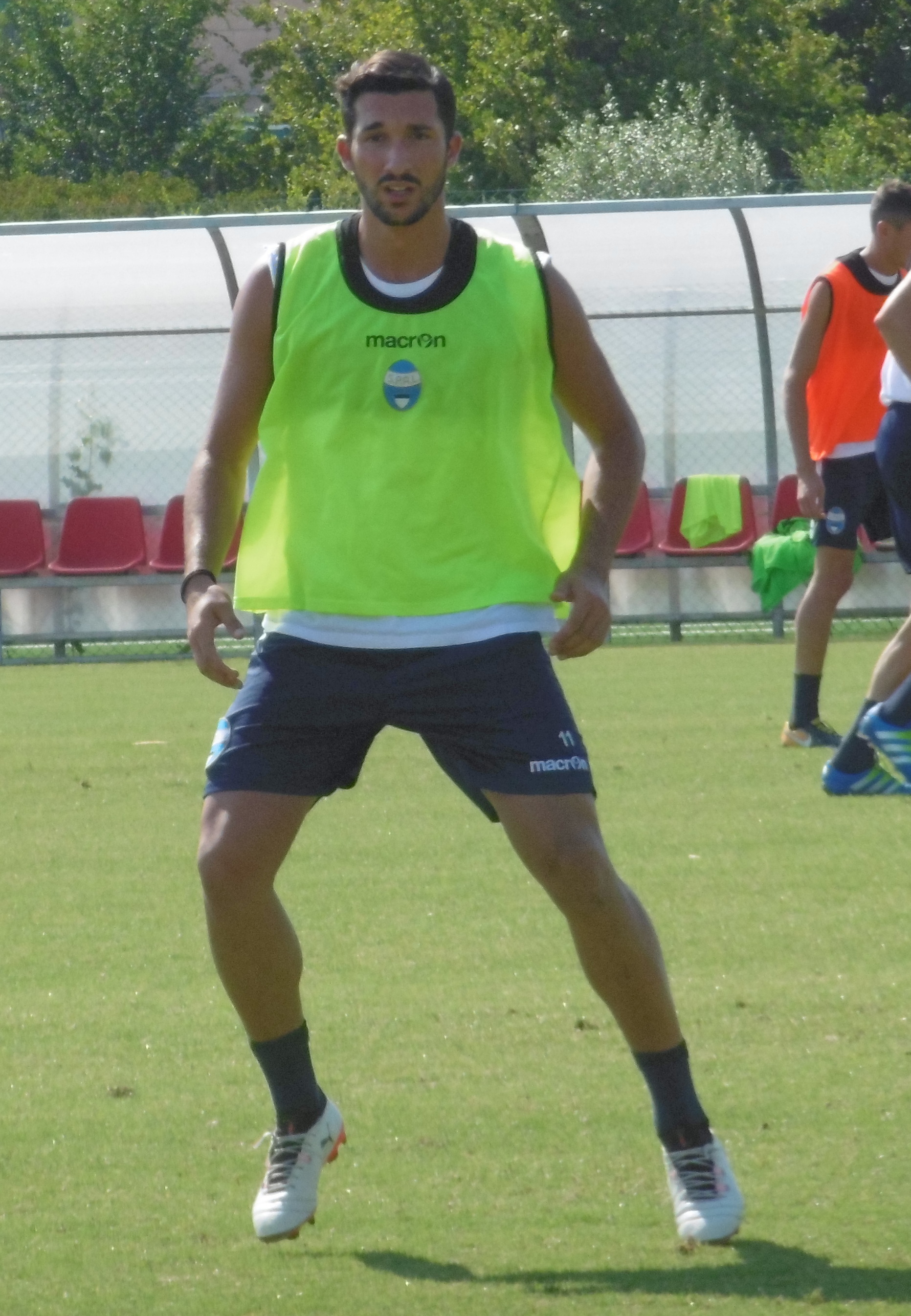

Personal information
- Date of birth: 7 August 1995 (age 31)
- Place of birth: Chioggia, Italy
- Height: 1.84 m (6 ft 0 in)
- Position: Midfielder

Team information
- Current team: Vicenza
- Number: 8

Youth career
- 2005–2013: Padova

Senior career*
Years	Team	Apps	(Gls)
2013–2014	Padova	2	(0)
2014–2019	SPAL	18	(0)
2016–2017	→ Fano (loan)	35	(0)
2018	→ Padova (loan)	7	(0)
2018–2019	→ Pro Vercelli (loan)	35	(0)
2019–2025	Como	166	(12)
2024–2025	→ Sampdoria (loan)	22	(1)
2025–2026	Sampdoria	11	(0)
2026	→ Spezia (loan)	11	(0)
2026–	Vicenza	3	(0)
- * Club domestic league appearances and goals as of 20 September 2026

Alessandro Bellemo (born 7 August 1995) is an Italian professional footballer who plays as a midfielder for Serie B club Vicenza.

== Career ==
Bellemo began his career wearing the Padova shirt, playing with the Primavera team in the 2012–13 season. In the 2013–14 season he joined the first team in Serie B, and was assigned the number 2 shirt. After being benched against Palermo (coach Marcolin was on the bench) and Brescia (coach Mutti was on the bench), he made his Serie B debut with coach Michele Serena on the bench in Padova-Pescara 2–1, replacing Renato Kelic in the 72nd minute, and on the last day in Padova-Avellino 2–1, replacing Matias Cuffa in the 68th minute. Following the non-inclusion of Padova in the 2014–15 championship, Bellemo was released and signed by Spal. In his first season with the Estensi he played on five occasions in Serie C, while in his second year he played on 13 occasions, winning a historic promotion to Serie B. In the 2016–17 season he moved on loan to Alma Juventus Fano where he played 35 games. He started the 2017–18 season at SPAL in Serie A, but not finding space, he moved on loan to Padova, returning to wear the biancoscudo after four years.

On 14 July 2019, he signed a three-year contract with Como.

On 1 August 2024, Bellemo joined Sampdoria on loan with an obligation to buy and signed a contract until 30 June 2027.

On 2 February 2026, Bellemo moved to Spezia on loan with an option to buy.

== Career statistics ==
As of match played 15 February 2025

Appearances and goals by club, season and competition
Club	Season	League			Cup		Other		Total	
Club	Season	Division	Apps	Goals	Apps	Goals	Apps	Goals	Apps	Goals
Padova	2013–14	Serie B	2	0	0	0	—		2	0
SPAL	2014–15	Lega Pro	5	0	6 (Note: Appearances in Coppa Italia Lega Pro)	0	—		11	0
SPAL	2015–16	Lega Pro	13	0	7 (Note: Five appearances in Coppa Italia Lega Pro, two appearances in Coppa Italia)	0	0	0	20	0
SPAL	Total		18	0	13	0	0	0	31	0
Fano (loan)	2016–17	Lega Pro	35	0	2	1	2 (Note: Appearances in Lega Pro-Relegation play-offs)	0	39	1
Padova (loan)	2017–18	Serie C	7	0	1 (Note: Appearance in Coppa Italia Serie C)	0	2 (Note: Appearances in Supercoppa di Serie C)	0	10	0
Vercelli (loan)	2018–19	Serie C	35	0	1	0	2 (Note: Appearances in Serie C-Promotion play-offs)	0	38	0
Como	2019–20	Serie C	26	0	2	1	—		28	1
Como	2020–21	Serie C	36	3	0	0	2	0	38	3
Como	2021–22	Serie B	37	5	1	0	—		38	5
Como	2022–23	Serie B	31	1	1	0	—		32	1
Como	2023–24	Serie B	36	3	1	0	—		37	3
Como	Total		166	12	5	1	2	0	173	13
Sampdoria (loan)	2024–25	Serie B	20	1	2	0	—		22	1
Career total			283	13	24	2	8	0	315	15

== Honours ==
SPAL

- Lega Pro: 2015–16 (Group B)
- Supercoppa di Serie C: 2016

Padova

- Serie C: 2017–18 (Group B)
- Supercoppa di Serie C: 2018

Como

- Serie C: 2020–21 (Group A)
