= Alessandro Gabrielloni =

Italian footballer (born 1994)

Personal information
- Date of birth: 10 July 1994 (age 32)
- Place of birth: Jesi, Italy
- Height: 1.78 m (5 ft 10 in)
- Position: Forward

Team information
- Current team: Palermo (on loan from Como)
- Number: 99

Senior career*
Years	Team	Apps	(Gls)
2010–2013	Jesina	53	(7)
2013–2014	Maceratese	30	(8)
2014–2015	Taranto	31	(8)
2015	Martina Franca	5	(0)
2015–2016	Campobasso	18	(8)
2016–2017	Cavese	32	(16)
2017–2018	Bisceglie	13	(0)
2018–	Como	218	(64)
2025–2026	→ Juve Stabia (loan)	26	(3)
2026–	→ Palermo (loan)	4	(0)
- * Club domestic league appearances and goals as of 19 September 2026

Alessandro Gabrielloni (born 10 July 1994) is an Italian footballer who plays as a forward for Serie B club Palermo, on loan from Como.

== Club career ==
Gabrielloni grew up in the Marche region of Italy, in Jesi, in a large, close-knit family. He played two years in the youth sector of Ancona, which was playing in Serie B at that time; the team went bankrupt and he returned to Jesina, a team from his village. After a couple of months he was taken to the first team in the D Series, at the age of 16. After graduating high school, he played for a year in Macerata.

On 30 August 2025, Gabrielloni joined Juve Stabia on loan for the 2025–26 season.

== Career statistics ==
As of match played 7 February 2026

Appearances and goals by club, season and competition
Club	Season	League			National Cup		Continental		Other		Total	
Club	Season	Division	Apps	Goals	Apps	Goals	Apps	Goals	Apps	Goals	Apps	Goals
Jesina	2010–11	Serie D	10	0	—		—		—		10	0
Jesina	2011–12	Serie D	12	2	—		—		—		12	2
Jesina	2012–13	Serie D	31	5	—		—		—		31	5
Jesina	Total		53	7	—		—		—		53	7
Maceratese	2013–14	Serie D	30	8	—		—		—		30	8
Taranto	2014–15	Serie D	31	8	1	0	—		4 (Note: Appearances in Serie D play-offs)	0	35	8
Martina	2015–16	Serie C	5	0	2	0	—		—		7	0
Campobasso	2015–16	Serie D	18	8	—		—		2	0	20	8
Cavese	2016–17	Serie D	32	16	—		—		2	0	34	16
Bisceglie	2017–18	Serie C	13	0	3	0	—		—		16	0
Como	2017–18	Serie D	16	11	—		—		—		16	11
Como	2018–19	Serie D	31	13	1	0	—		—		32	13
Como	2019–20	Serie C	26	10	2	0	—		—		28	10
Como	2020–21	Serie C	35	12	0	0	—		2 (Note: Appearances in Supercoppa di Serie C)	1	37	13
Como	2021–22	Serie B	32	4	1	0	—		—		33	4
Como	2022–23	Serie B	29	4	1	0	—		—		30	4
Como	2023–24	Serie B	34	9	1	0	—		—		35	9
Como	2024–25	Serie A	15	1	1	0	—		—		16	1
Como	Total		218	64	7	0	—		2	1	227	65
Juve Stabia (loan)	2025–26	Serie B	12	2	—		—		—		12	2
Career total			413	114	13	0	0	0	10	1	436	115
