= Elia Di Giuliomaria =

Italian football player (born 2004)

Personal information
- Date of birth: 12 August 2004 (age 22)
- Place of birth: Varese, Italy
- Position: Defender

Team information
- Current team: Casatese

Youth career
- –2020: Inter Milan
- 2019–2020: → Renate (loan)
- 2020–2023: Como

Senior career*
Years	Team	Apps	(Gls)
2022–2023	Como	1	(0)
2023–	Casatese	1	(0)
- * Club domestic league appearances and goals as of 20 December 2023

Elia Di Giuliomaria (born 12 August 2004) is an Italian football player who plays for Serie D club Casatese.

== Club career ==
He made his Serie B debut for Como on 6 May 2022 in a game against Cremonese.

On 27 July 2023, Di Giuliomaria joined Casatese in Serie D.
