= Patrick Cutrone =

Italian footballer (born 1998)

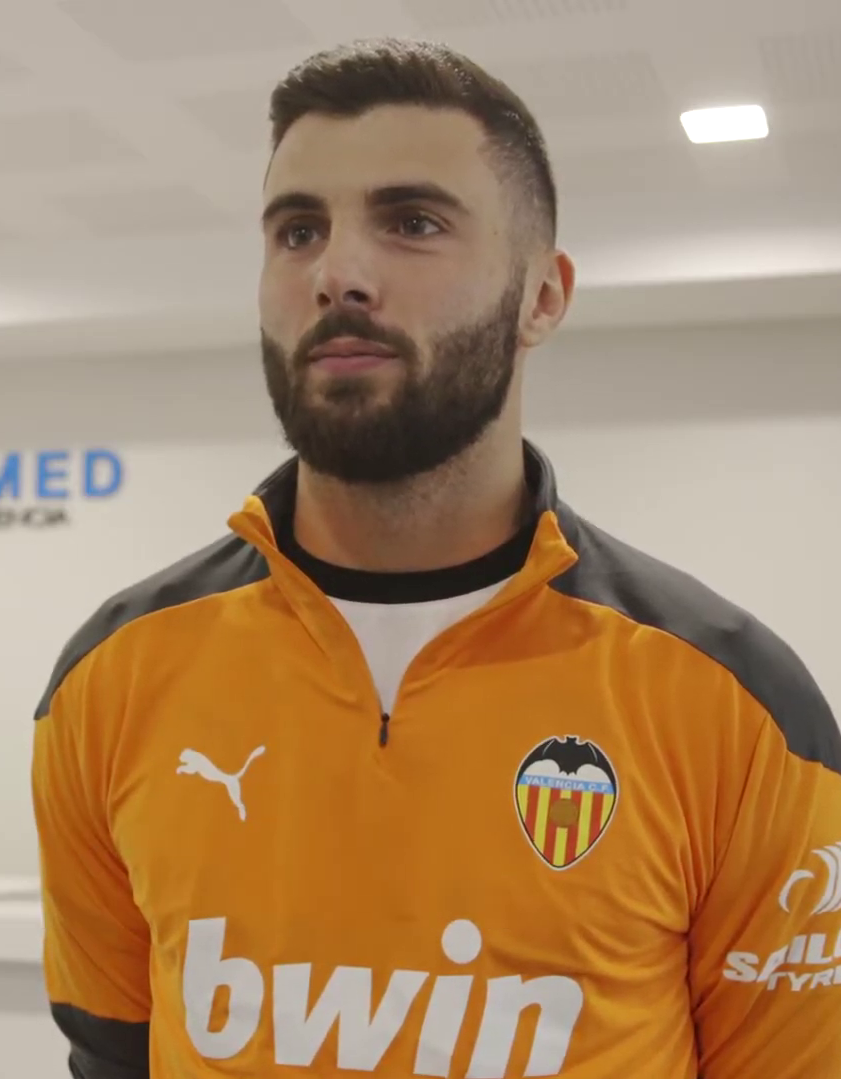
- Cutrone with Valencia in 2021

Personal information
- Full name: Patrick Cutrone
- Date of birth: 3 January 1998 (age 28)
- Place of birth: Como, Italy
- Height: 1.83 m (6 ft 0 in)
- Positions: Forward; attacking midfielder

Team information
- Current team: Monza
- Number: 10

Youth career
- 2003–2007: Parediense
- 2007–2017: AC Milan

Senior career*
Years	Team	Apps	(Gls)
2017–2019	AC Milan	63	(13)
2019–2022	Wolverhampton Wanderers	14	(2)
2020–2021	→ Fiorentina (loan)	30	(4)
2020-2021	→ Valencia (loan)	7	(0)
2021–2022	→ Empoli (loan)	28	(3)
2022–2026	Como	100	(30)
2025–2026	→ Parma (loan)	15	(1)
2026	→ Monza (loan)	16	(4)
2026–	Monza	0	(0)

International career^{‡}
2013	Italy U15	10	(3)
2013–2014	Italy U16	8	(5)
2013–2015	Italy U17	18	(11)
2016	Italy U18	3	(2)
2016–2017	Italy U19	18	(6)
2017–2021	Italy U21	25	(11)
2018	Italy	1	(0)
Medal record
Men's football
Representing Italy
UEFA European Under-19 Championship
Runner-up	2016 Germany
- * Club domestic league appearances and goals as of 23:14, 8 May 2026 (UTC) ‡ National team caps and goals as of 31 May 2021

Patrick Cutrone (Italian: [ˈpaːtrik kuˈtroːne]; born 3 January 1998) is an Italian professional footballer who plays as a forward or attacking midfielder for Serie A club Monza.

== Club career ==
=== AC Milan ===
Cutrone was born in Como and began to play football at a young age. In 2005, the 7-year old Cutrone started his youth career at the local team GS Parediense. In the summer of 2007, he had trials at Internazionale, Monza, and AC Milan. On 29 June 2007 he officially joined AC Milan's academy, where he spent the following ten years, playing through the different age groups up to the Primavera (under-19) team. In March 2015, Cutrone signed his first professional contract with Milan, effective from 1 July 2015 until 30 June 2018.

Cutrone received his first ever call-up to the senior team for a home game against Pescara played on 30 October 2016; he was an unused substitute. In January 2017, Cutrone was promoted to Milan's first team. On 21 May 2017, he made his senior debut in the 3–0 Serie A home win against Bologna, coming on as a substitute for Gerard Deulofeu at the 85th minute.

In the summer of 2017, Cutrone signed a contract extension until 30 June 2021, while Milan's Chinese-led board of directors spent over €200 million on transfers, acquiring a total of 11 new players, two of which were strikers André Silva and Nikola Kalinić. Initially, in order to increase his playing time, Cutrone had been persuaded to join one of the lower-ranking Serie A clubs yet refused.

On 27 July 2017, he was featured in the starting line-up for the first time in a 1–0 away victory over Romanian side Universitatea Craiova in the 2017–18 Europa League qualification. On 3 August, he scored his first goal for Milan in the return match of the same tie, which finished 2–0 for his team. On 20 August, he scored his first Serie A goal in a 0–3 Serie A away win against Crotone. On 24 August, he scored the only goal in a 1–0 away victory over Shkëndija in Europa League playoffs, and on 28 September, he scored a last-minute winning goal against Rijeka in the group stage to win the match 3–2 for Milan. Coming on as a substitute in the Coppa Italia match against local rivals, Internazionale, Cutrone scored the winner and his first goal in the Derby della Madonnina.

On 28 January 2018, Cutrone scored an opening goal in the home Serie A game against Lazio. Initially, the goal was thought to be a header by the referee and Lazio players alike. However, after the final whistle, it became clear that following a free kick taken by Hakan Çalhanoğlu, the ball instead deflected off his arm straight into the goal. Although it was reported that Cutrone may possibly get a two-match ban for an alleged deliberate handball, an investigation conducted by governing body the FIGC proved that his actions in that episode were unintentional and, therefore, non-punishable. On 10 February 2018, Cutrone scored a brace in a 4–0 away victory over SPAL.

In the summer of 2018, Milan's new board of directors decided to increase the team's attacking capability with the signing of a high-profile goalscorer, Gonzalo Higuaín, whom Cutrone first met in 2015 as a fan. Following his arrival, out of all the remaining strikers in the team (namely Nikola Kalinić, André Silva, and Carlos Bacca), Cutrone was the only one to have not been placed on the transfer market. On 31 August 2018, Cutrone came on as a late substitute and scored a last-minute match-winning goal in a 2018–19 Serie A home game against Roma (2–1), helping Milan secure the very first competitive victory in the season.

In October 2018, Cutrone extended his contract with Milan until 30 June 2023.

On 12 January 2019, Cutrone came on as an extra-time substitute and scored two first-touch goals within just six minutes in an eventual Coppa Italia 2–0 away win against Sampdoria. In the same month, the club opted for an early termination of Gonzalo Higuaín's loan and bought Krzysztof Piątek as a first-choice striker, whose role on the pitch and style of play were considered "too similar" with those of Cutrone. The team's head coach, Gennaro Gattuso, also refused to pair strikers for tactical reasons and preferred 4–3–3 as his regular starting formation. As a result, Cutrone's playing time and quality of performances continued to decrease, with the player failing to score or assist in his 18 consecutive appearances, mostly as a super-sub. As Milan once again failed to qualify for the Champions League, Gattuso resigned and was replaced by Marco Giampaolo. Despite Giampaolo favoring 4–3–1–2 over any other formation, Cutrone's opportunities at Milan were still considered limited as the new coach sought to pair Piątek with a different type of an attacking partner than him.

=== Wolverhampton Wanderers ===
On 30 July 2019, Cutrone joined Wolverhampton Wanderers on a four-year contract. Cutrone made his league debut for Wolves as a substitute in their opening Premier League fixture of the 2019–20 season, a 0–0 away draw with Leicester City on 11 August, having made his debut appearance (also as a substitute) in the club's 2019–20 UEFA Europa League match away to FC Pyunik of Armenia three days earlier. On 15 August, Cutrone made his full debut for Wolves in a 4–0 home win against FC Pyunik in the 2nd Leg of the UEFA Europa League Third Qualifying Round. Cutrone made his full Premier League debut for Wolves in a 3–2 away defeat to Everton on 1 September. His first goal for Wolves came on 14 September, in a 2–5 home loss to Chelsea in the Premier League. In a 2–0 home success against West Ham United on 4 December 2019, Cutrone scored having only been on the pitch for two minutes as an 84th minute substitute.

==== Fiorentina (loan) ====
Cutrone joined Fiorentina on an 18-month loan deal on 10 January 2020. Two days later he made his debut, as a 75th-minute substitute for Federico Chiesa in a 1–0 home win over SPAL. On 15 January, he scored to open a 2–1 win over Atalanta in the last 16 of the Coppa Italia, also at the Stadio Artemio Franchi. He scored four goals from 19 Serie A appearances during the second half of the 2019–20 season.

After failing to score a goal or start a match during the first half of the 2020–21 Serie A season, Cutrone was recalled by Wolverhampton Wanderers on 7 January 2021.

==== Return to Wolves ====
On 8 January 2021, Cutrone was named in Wolves' squad for their FA Cup third round tie against Crystal Palace, playing the final twelve minutes as a substitute. He went on to make substitute appearances in the Premier League against Everton and West Bromwich Albion, before starting in an FA Cup fourth Round tie away to Chorley on 22 January 2021, a game Wolves won 1–0.

==== Valencia (loan) ====
On 31 January 2021, La Liga club Valencia announced the signing of Cutrone on loan for the remainder of the 2020–21 season. He made seven substitute appearances without scoring, playing a total of only 100 minutes during his time in Spain.

==== Empoli (loan) ====
On 13 August 2021, Cutrone joined newly promoted Serie A club Empoli on loan for the 2021–22 season.

On 23 October, Cutrone scored his first goal in club football since 19 July 2020 in a 4–2 win over Salernitana. On 12 December, he scored the only goal of a 1–0 win against Napoli at the Stadio Diego Armando Maradona.

He ended the season with three goals from 31 matches.

=== Como ===
On 29 August 2022, Cutrone was signed by hometown club Como on a three-year contract. He scored his first two goals for Como in a 3–3 draw against SPAL on 17 September. He ended his first season at the club with nine goals from 35 Serie B matches.

In the 2023–24 season, Cutrone top scored for Como with 14 goals from 32 matches as the club finished second in Serie B, achieving promotion to Serie A after a 21-year absence.

On 19 August 2024, Cutrone captained Como on their return to Serie A, a 3–0 loss to Juventus. In the following match, he scored the club's first top-flight goal since May 2003 with the equaliser in a 1–1 draw at Cagliari. In the home fixture against the same opposition, Cutrone made his 100th appearance for Como, scoring in a 3–1 win on 10 May 2025. He ended the season with seven goals and five assists from 33 Serie A matches.

==== Parma (loan) ====
On 29 August 2025, Cutrone joined Parma on loan for the 2025–26 season. He made his debut for the Gialloblù a day later, scoring the equalising goal four minutes after coming on as an 85th-minute substitute in a 1–1 draw with Atalanta.

==== Monza (loan) ====
On 30 January 2026, Cutrone moved on a new loan to Monza in Serie B, with a conditional obligation to buy.

== International career ==
Cutrone represented Italy at Italy under-15, under-16, under-17, under-18 and under-19 level, making 57 appearances and scoring 27 goals. In particular, he was part of the squad for both the 2015 European U-17 Championship and the 2016 European U-19 Championship.

He made his debut with the Italy U21 team on 1 September 2017, in a friendly match lost 3–0 against Spain. Three days later, he played his second match against Slovenia U21 in which he scored his first goal for the side in a 4–1 victory.

In March 2018, he was awarded his first senior call-up to the Italy national team, under interim manager Luigi Di Biagio, for Italy's friendlies against Argentina and England later that month. On 23 March, he made his senior international debut in the friendly against Argentina; Italy were defeated 2–0.

Cutrone was a member of Di Biagio's 23-man Italy under-21 side for the 2019 UEFA European Under-21 Championship on home soil; He scored in Italy's final group match – a 3–1 victory over Belgium on 22 June, although Italy were eliminated in the first round after finishing second in their group on goal difference behind Spain following a three–way six–point tie with Spain and Poland; Italy also finished as the second–best second–place team, behind France, who progressed to the semifinals of the competition.

== Style of play ==
Known for his eye for goal, Cutrone has been described as a "true number 9" by several Italian football pundits. His main playing attributes as a forward are his physical strength, positioning, aerial ability, and heading, as well as his opportunism, movement, and ability to read the game; he has also drawn praise in the media for his work-rate off the ball, while his technique and team play have been cited as areas for improvement, however. Due to his characteristics, he has been compared to former Milan striker Filippo Inzaghi, who used to train him while working as a coach with the Milan Youth Sector from 2012 to 2014. Although an avid Milan fan since childhood, he idolized Mattia Destro while playing for Milan Primavera and was also called "the young Destro" because of their similarities. Other players he idolizes are Andrea Belotti and Álvaro Morata, with the latter praising Cutrone for his performances in 2018. Although he is naturally right-footed, he is capable of striking the ball well with either foot.

Apart from his regular position as a central striker, Cutrone has also been used as a makeshift left winger by his former Milan coach Gennaro Gattuso, in a role similar to that of Mario Mandžukić at Juventus. Cutrone is also capable of playing alongside another attacking teammate in a 4–4–2 formation, balancing between the roles of a centre-forward/striker and a second striker.

Former Milan forward Daniele Massaro likened Cutrone to himself in 2019, also referring to the latter as a "supersub," due to his penchant for scoring decisive goals after coming off the bench.

== Personal life ==
Although Cutrone was born in Como, his paternal side of family comes from Campobasso, the Molise region in the South of Italy, and his last name referres to the town of Cutro in the province of Crotone, the region of Calabria.

In 2021, Cutrone visited the UEFA Euro 2020 Final played in London at Wembley Stadium between Italy and England, cheering his compatriots to victory amongst the crowd of about seven thousand Italian supporters. During the game, he was with the ultras and directed chants of support to the Azzurri players.

On 26 January 2022, his father Pasquale Cutrone died. Prior to his father's death, during his time with Milan and Fiorentina, Cutrone used to wear the number 63 jersey as a tribute to his father, who was born in 1963.

On 21 June 2023, Cutrone married Greta Vergani in his hometown of Como, with Manuel Locatelli as the best man at his wedding. On 9 April 2024, the couple welcomed the birth of their first child, daughter Bianca Beatrice. On 3 December 2025, the birth of the couple's second child, a son named Diego Damiano, was announced.

== Career statistics ==
=== Club ===
As of match played 29 May 2026

Appearances and goals by club, season and competition
Club	Season	League			National cup (Note: Includes Coppa Italia, FA Cup, Copa del Rey)		League cup (Note: Includes EFL Cup)		Europe		Other		Total	
Club	Season	Division	Apps	Goals	Apps	Goals	Apps	Goals	Apps	Goals	Apps	Goals	Apps	Goals
AC Milan	2016–17	Serie A	1	0	0	0	—		—		0	0	1	0
AC Milan	2017–18	Serie A	28	10	5	2	—		13 (Note: Appearances in UEFA Europa League)	6	—		46	18
AC Milan	2018–19	Serie A	34	3	3	2	—		5	4	1 (Note: Appearance in Supercoppa Italiana)	0	43	9
AC Milan	Total		63	13	8	4	0	0	18	10	1	0	90	27
Wolverhampton Wanderers	2019–20	Premier League	12	2	0	0	2	1	10	0	—		24	3
Wolverhampton Wanderers	2020–21	Premier League	2	0	2	0	0	0	—		—		4	0
Wolverhampton Wanderers	Total		14	2	2	0	2	1	10	0	0	0	28	3
Fiorentina (loan)	2019–20	Serie A	19	4	2	1	—		—		—		21	5
Fiorentina (loan)	2020–21	Serie A	11	0	2	0	—		—		—		13	0
Fiorentina (loan)	Total		30	4	4	1	0	0	0	0	0	0	34	5
Valencia (loan)	2020–21	La Liga	7	0	0	0	—		—		—		7	0
Empoli (loan)	2021–22	Serie A	28	3	3	0	—		—		—		31	3
Como	2022–23	Serie B	35	9	0	0	—		—		—		35	9
Como	2023–24	Serie B	32	14	1	0	—		—		—		33	14
Como	2024–25	Serie A	33	7	1	1	—		—		—		34	8
Como	Total		100	30	2	1	0	0	0	0	0	0	102	31
Parma (loan)	2025–26	Serie A	15	1	2	0	—		—		—		17	1
Monza (loan)	2025–26	Serie B	16	4	—		—		—		4 (Note: Appearances in Serie B promotion play-offs)	2	20	6
Career total			273	57	21	6	2	1	28	10	5	2	329	76

=== International ===
As of match played 23 March 2018

National team	Year	Apps	Goals
Italy	2018	1	0
Total		1	0

== Honours ==
Italy U19

- UEFA European Under-19 Championship runner-up: 2016
