= Luca Zanotti =

Italian footballer

Personal information
- Date of birth: 29 April 1994 (age 32)
- Place of birth: Trescore Balneario, Italy
- Height: 1.86 m (6 ft 1 in)
- Position: Goalkeeper

Youth career
- –2013: Atalanta

Senior career*
Years	Team	Apps	(Gls)
2013–2019	Atalanta	0	(0)
2013–2014	→ Virtus Entella (loan)	2	(0)
2014–2015	→ Carrarese (loan)	11	(0)
2015–2016	→ Melfi (loan)	0	(0)
2016	→ Pro Patria (loan)	1	(0)
2016–2017	→ Como (loan)	30	(0)
2017–2018	→ Juve Stabia (loan)	1	(0)
2019–2023	Como	4	(0)
- * Club domestic league appearances and goals as of 31 January 2023

Luca Zanotti (born 29 April 1994) is an Italian footballer who last played as a goalkeeper for then Serie B club Como.

== Club career ==
He made his Serie C debut for Virtus Entella on 11 May 2014 in a game against Perugia.

On 7 July 2019, he signed with Como. On 31 January 2023, Zanotti's contract with Como was terminated by mutual consent.
