= Ismail H'Maidat =

Moroccan footballer (born 1995)

Personal information
- Date of birth: 16 June 1995 (age 31)
- Place of birth: Enschede, Netherlands
- Height: 1.85 m (6 ft 1 in)
- Position: Attacking midfielder

Team information
- Current team: SSV Jeddeloh
- Number: 27

Youth career
- –2008: Twente
- 2008–2009: Turnhout
- 2009–2010: Westerlo
- 2010–2011: Genk
- 2011–2013: OH Leuven
- 2013–2014: Crystal Palace
- 2014: Anderlecht

Senior career*
Years	Team	Apps	(Gls)
2014–2016	Brescia	41	(1)
2016–2018	Roma	0	(0)
2016	→ Ascoli (loan)	0	(0)
2016–2017	→ Vicenza (loan)	0	(0)
2017	→ Olhanense (loan)	8	(1)
2017–2018	→ Westerlo (loan)	3	(0)
2019–2023	Como	53	(0)
2022	→ Südtirol (loan)	6	(0)
2024	Dubai City	10	(1)
2025	Precision		
2025–2026	Bremer SV	16	(3)
2026–	SSV Jeddeloh	5	(0)

International career
2015	Morocco U23	1	(0)
2016	Morocco	1	(0)
- * Club domestic league appearances and goals as of 17 September 2026

Ismail H'Maidat (Arabic: إسماعيل حمايدات; born 16 June 1995) is a professional footballer who plays as an attacking midfielder for Regionalliga Nord club SSV Jeddeloh. Born in the Netherlands, he has represented Morocco at senior international level.

== Club career ==
=== Brescia ===
H'Maidat played for various teams in his youth career. In 2014, he joined Brescia. He made his Serie B debut on 30 May 2014 against Trapani. He came in as an 87th-minute substitute for Daniele Corvia in a 0–1 away win.

=== Roma ===
On 31 January 2016, H'Maidat moved to Serie A club Roma for €3.15 million fee (€150,000 cash plus Ndoj and Somma). on a four-and-a-half-year contract. He joined Ascoli on a temporary deal immediately.

In August 2016 H'Maidat was signed by Serie B club Vicenza. He left the club in January 2017. He was loaned to Portuguese club Olhanense, which was coached by an Italian Cristiano Bacci.

On 7 July 2017, H'Maidat was loaned to Belgian club Westerlo. In January 2018 he was fired by Westerlo for sportsperson unworthy behavior off the field.

=== Como ===
On 25 July 2019, after a trial period, H'Maidat was signed by Serie C club Como allowing him to return to active football.

On 31 January 2022, H'Maidat was loaned to Südtirol.

=== Bremer SV ===
In August 2025, H'Maidat moved to Regionalliga Nord club Bremer SV.

== International career ==
H'Maidat made his first appearance for the senior Morocco national team in a 4–0 friendly win over Canada in October 2016.

== Personal life ==
On 13 March 2018, it was announced that he was arrested for five armed robberies in Belgium. Initially he was found guilty, but H'Maidat successfully appealed the decision and was totally absolved in May 2019, letting him free to comeback to football activities after having spent ten months in jail.
