= Enrico Celeghin =

Italian footballer (born 1999)

Personal information
- Date of birth: 22 February 1999 (age 27)
- Place of birth: Dolo, Italy
- Height: 1.81 m (5 ft 11 in)
- Position: Midfielder

Team information
- Current team: Guidonia

Youth career
- –2018: Inter Milan
- 2017–2018: → Torino (loan)

Senior career*
| Years | Team | Apps | (Gls) |
| 2018–2019 | Inter Milan | 0 | (0) |
| 2018–2019 | → Como (loan) | 30 | (4) |
| 2019–2023 | Como | 35 | (2) |
| 2021–2022 | → Renate (loan) | 34 | (3) |
| 2023 | → Triestina (loan) | 14 | (0) |
| 2023–2024 | Triestina | 33 | (3) |
| 2024–2025 | Giugliano | 31 | (1) |
| 2025–2026 | Trapani | 36 | (6) |
| 2026– | Guidonia | 0 | (0) |
- * Club domestic league appearances and goals as of 1 May 2026

Enrico Celeghin (born 22 February 1999) is an Italian professional footballer who plays as a midfielder for Serie C Group B club Guidonia.

== Career ==
Following a year-long loan spell with the club, Celeghin moved to Como permanently in June 2019.

On 9 August 2021 he went to Renate on loan.

On 18 January 2023 he went to Triestina on loan. Celeghin returned to Triestina on a permanent basis with a two-year contract in August 2023.

On 14 August 2024, Celeghin signed a two-season contract with Giugliano.
