= Massimiliano Gatto =

Italian footballer

Personal information
- Date of birth: 28 October 1995 (age 31)
- Place of birth: Trebisacce, Italy
- Height: 1.82 m (6 ft 0 in)
- Position: Striker

Youth career
- –2014: Chievo

Senior career*
Years	Team	Apps	(Gls)
2014–2018	Chievo	0	(0)
2014–2015	→ Carpi (loan)	11	(0)
2015	→ Pro Vercelli (loan)	11	(1)
2016–2017	→ Pisa (loan)	22	(1)
2018–2019	Pro Vercelli	40	(3)
2019–2023	Como	53	(13)
- * Club domestic league appearances and goals

Massimiliano Gatto (born 28 October 1995) is an Italian former footballer who played as a striker.

== Club career ==
Gatto is a youth exponent from Chievo. On 1 August 2014, he joined Serie B side Carpi on a season-long loan. He made his debut on 27 September 2014 against Virtus Entella in a Serie B game. He came in as an 80th-minute substitute for Filippo Porcari in a 2–0 away defeat.

In 2017–18 season, both Massimiliano Gatto and Emanuele Gatto remained in Chievo. However, they both left the club in January 2018. Massimiliano was signed by Pro Vercelli; he was assigned number 19 shirt of the first team.

On 17 August 2019, he signed a 3-year contract with Como.
