= Pierre Bolchini =

Italian footballer (born 2005)

Personal information
- Date of birth: 27 February 1999 (age 27)
- Place of birth: Novara, Italy
- Height: 2.00 m (6 ft 7 in)
- Position: Goalkeeper

Team information
- Current team: San Marino

Youth career
- 2014–2015: Sunese
- 2015–2016: Sporting Bellinzago
- 2016–2017: Inter Milan
- 2017–2018: Novara

Senior career*
Years	Team	Apps	(Gls)
2018–2019	Novara	0	(0)
2018–2019	→ GS Arconatese (loan)	21	(0)
2019–2025	Como	1	(0)
2026–	San Marino	0	(0)
- * Club domestic league appearances and goals as of 1 March 2026

Pierre Bolchini (born 27 February 1999) is an Italian professional footballer who plays as a goalkeeper for Sammarinese club San Marino that plays in the Italian fourth-tier Serie D.

== Career ==
Bolchini is a product of the youth academies of Sporting Bellinzago, Inter Milan and Novara. For the 2018–19 season, he moved to GS Arconatese on loan in the Serie D where he made his first senior appearances. On 28 August 2019, transferred to the Serie C club Como for 2 seasons. In May 2020, he contracted COVID-19 during the COVID-19 pandemic, and had to train by himself under quarantine. He made his senior and professional debut with Como in a 5–0 Serie C win over Novara on 2 May 2021, saving a penalty in the first match after the club clinched the 2020–21 Serie C. He was the backup goalkeeper as the club achieved promotion to the Serie A for the 2024–25 season, with his contract expiring in 2025.

== Honours ==
Como 1907

- Serie C: 2020–21
