= Stadio Giuseppe Sinigaglia =

Stadium in Como, Italy

Coordinates: 45°48′50″N 9°4′20″E

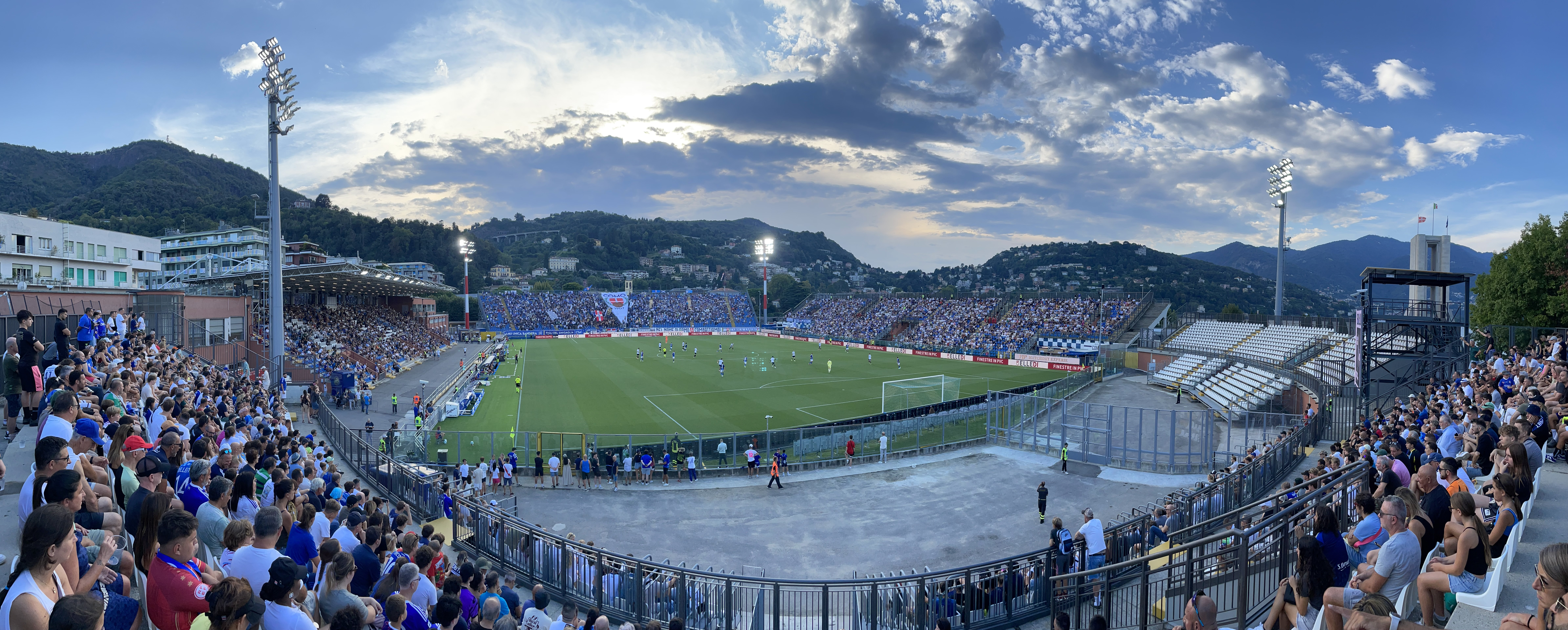
- Interactive map of Stadio Giuseppe Sinigaglia
- Location: Como, Italy
- Owner: Municipality of Como
- Capacity: 13,602
- Surface: Grass

Construction
- Opened: 1927
- Renovated: 1990; 2002–2004; 2024; 2026–present
- Architect: Giovanni Greppi

Tenants
- Como 1907; Italy national football team (selected matches)

Stadio Giuseppe Sinigaglia is a multi-use stadium in Como, Italy. It is primarily used for football matches as the home ground of Como 1907. The stadium has a capacity of 13,602 spectators.

Completed in 1927, it was built on the orders of Benito Mussolini and was designed by architect Giovanni Greppi. Its construction represented one of the first examples of rationalist architecture in Italy; it is named after rower and war hero Giuseppe Sinigaglia, a native of Como, who died in the First World War.

The stadium is owned by the Municipality of Como, which grants it for use by the Como football club for its home matches.

== History ==
As the city of Como lacked a stadium, it was decided to build it on the occasion of the 1927 Celebrations for Alessandro Volta, a native of Como. Work began in October 1926 on the site of a pre-existing ground. Back then, the stadium was equipped with two tracks: a 500-metre velodrome and a 450-metre track and field for athletics, which surrounded the 7200-square-metre football pitch: the total capacity of the stands was 6,000 people.

After the enthusiastic approval of the then CONI president Lando Ferretti, the stadium was inaugurated on 30 July 1927 and dedicated to Giuseppe Sinigaglia (1884-1916), a war volunteer decorated for valour who died on Mount San Michele during a war action. In 1932, the Opera Nazionale Balilla (ONB) assumed control of the ground as its regional headquarters and commissioned Gianni Mantero to add on a swimming pool, gym, fencing room and offices. As part of the deal, the original, neo-classical façade was replaced with something more in keeping with the vogue for rationalist architecture.

=== Restructuring works ===
In the following years, starting in 1975, the stadium underwent various interventions and modifications that partially distorted its original characteristics: the athletics and cycling tracks were removed, with subsequent reconstruction of the central grandstand and extension of the stands up to the edge of the playing field after the installation of metal bleachers; in the process, the opening in the middle of this section of the bleachers, which allowed a view of the lake from the covered grandstand, was also closed. In 1990, the "Tribuna stand" was demolished and rebuilt. The West curve (also known as the "Curva Azzurra" or "Curva Como", home of the organised supporters of the club) was also completely rebuilt in 2002 with a peculiar structure of two metal bleachers, forming a wedge stretching outwards from the stadium, with a capacity of around 5,000 seats. Additional grandstands were then added to the east curve (partially dedicated to the visiting fans), the masonry part of which was instead rebuilt, so that in the 2002–03 season Como was able to play in Serie A in a facility with a capacity of around 14,000. The subsequent decline in the club's fortunes, with bankruptcies and restarts from amateur levels, led to a drastic reduction in the official seating capacity, which dropped to less than 5,000 seats after the closure of the oldest part of the "Distinti" stands and the home fans' section of the East curve.

Minor interventions followed over the years to keep the facility in line with the required standards: in the 2015–16 season, Como had to play its first home matches in Novara because in the summer renovation work was still being carried out on the stadium. In 2017 the roofing of the "Tribuna", still today the only covered sector of the facility, was rearranged, forcing Como to play some of the matches of the 2017–18 season in other cities. In 2021 following Como's return to Serie B seats were installed in all areas open to the public, the turf was resodded and VAR and goal-line technology systems were installed. In 2023 a further intervention included the overall modernization of the lighting system and the four light towers that had caused blackout problems in previous seasons as well as interfering with the flight operations of the nearby seaplane base. With Como's promotion to Serie A in 2024, the entire "Distinti" sector, previously unfit for use since 2016, was renovated and equipped with seats. The intervention brought the facility to a capacity of 10,584 seats.

=== Major developments ===
A complete renovation of the facility has been discussed for years, in order to make it fully suitable for Italy's top leagues, as well as how the current problems of managing the flow of people in such a central area of the city can be overcome.

In February 2025, the club's ownership presented a project for the future redevelopment of the Como facility to the mayor of Como. The project plans the future expansion of the seats up to 15,000, as well as a redevelopment of the area surrounding the stadium, and it is expected to be completed by 2028.

In May 2026, Como 1907 began a major stadium redevelopment ahead of possible UEFA competitions. The "Curva Como" was demolished and rebuilt in reinforced concrete to meet UEFA requirements, increasing the stadium's capacity to 12,379 seats. The project also included pitch expansion, new undersoil heating, upgraded media and hospitality areas, and improved accessibility.

== Specifics ==
The total capacity of the stadium is (as of 2025) 10,759 spectators; in the last season in which Como played in Serie A (2002-2003), the capacity was 13,900. Over the years the maximum capacity has been changed several times and adapted to the categories in which Como played, to the needs and safety standards. Finally, the particularity of the stadium is that it located very close to the lakeshore, which is clearly visible from most of the stands. For this distinctive feature, the stadium was labelled as "the most beautiful in the world" by the famous Italian sports journalist Gianni Brera.

For the 2023-2024 football season, in which Como played the Serie B championship, the commercial capacity of the stadium was about 7,000 seats, increased several times during the season. On 1 March 2024, the available seats were 7,798, of which 3,960 in the west corner, 800 in the "Distinti" stands, 2,338 in the central grandstand and 700 in the east corner. After the intervention in the summer of 2024, the capacity of the stands was increased to 3,666 seats. In February 2025, the away supporters sector of the stadium was expanded by adding an additional 175 seats. Due to the presence of the seaplane base, two of the four light towers that illuminate the pitch (the ones on either side of the west corner) are painted white and red; just to the side of one of them there is also a wind-sleeve. The resulting light pollution has often been a source of discomfort for flight operations.

== Other events hosted ==
=== Sports ===
Three matches of the Italy national under-21 football team were held in the Como stadium, in 1977, 1993 and 2002.

From 1960 to 1974, the Sinigaglia stadium hosted the finish of the classic cycling race Giro di Lombardia.

In 2013, it hosted the final phase (semi-finals and finals) of the NextGen Series.

=== Others ===
Pope John Paul II's helicopter landed at the Sinigaglia stadium here on 4 May 1996 on the occasion of his visit to the Italian city.

In 2004, British rock band Deep Purple played a concert there. In 2008 Italian singer Jovanotti also performed at the stadium.
