= List of Como 1907 players =

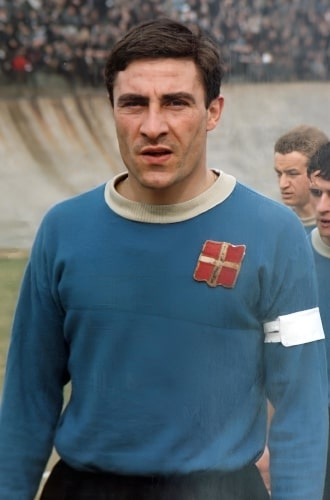
Bruno Ballarini is Como's all-time jumping appearance-maker.

Como 1907 is an Italian professional football club based in Como. The club was founded in May 1907 as Como Foot-Ball Club, and played their first competitive season in 1912–13 Prima Categoria. Since playing their first competitive match, many players have made competitive first-team appearances for the club, some of whom have made at least 100 appearances (including substitute appearances); these players are listed here.

Como's record appearance-maker is Bruno Ballarini, who made 350 appearances in a total of 12 consecutive seasons with the club, from 1958 to 1970. The second second-highest appearance-maker is Giancarlo Centi, who has made 335 appearances for the club. The club's current player Alessandro Gabrielloni, is their third top goalscorer with 64 goals in 215 appearances, behind Antonio Cetti who has scored 91 goals in 278 appearances, and Marco Romano who has scored 71 goals in 101 appearances.

== List of players ==
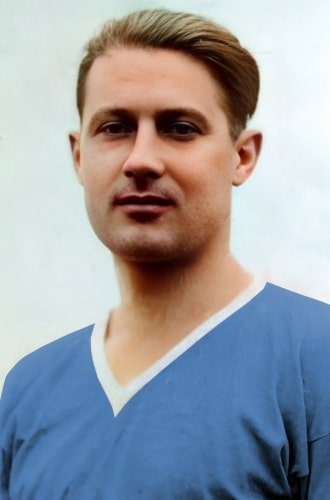
Antonio Cetti is Como's all-time top goalscorer.

- Appearances and goals are for first-team competitive matches only, including domestic league (Serie A, Serie B, Divisione Nazionale, Prima Divisione, Prima Categoria), domestic cup (Coppa Italia, Supercoppa Italiana, Torneo Estivo del 1986) UEFA competition (European Cup/Champions League, UEFA Cup/Europa League, Cup Winners' Cup, Super Cup, Intercontinental Cup), pre-UEFA European competition (Latin Cup, Inter-Cities Fairs Cup, Mitropa Cup, Coppa dell'Amicizia, Cup of the Alps) and FIFA Club World Cup matches; wartime matches are regarded as unofficial and are excluded.
- Players are listed according to the date of their first team debut for the club.

Statistics correct as of match played 5 August 2024

Table headers

- Nationality – If a player played international football, the country or countries he played for are shown. Otherwise, the player's nationality is given as his citizenship of birth (or the corresponding one at the time they played for Como).
- Como career – The year of the player's first appearance for Como to the year of his last appearance.

Positions key
Pre-1960s		Post-1960s	
GK	Goalkeeper		
FB	Full back	DF	Defender
HB	Half back	MF	Midfielder
FW	Forward		
U	Utility player (Note: A utility player is one who is considered to play in more than one position.)		

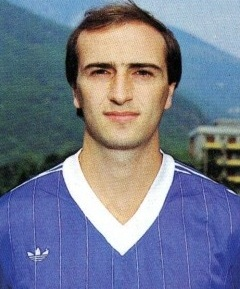
Giancarlo Centi is Como's second-highest appearance-maker.

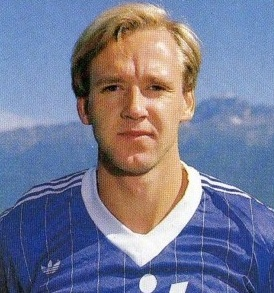
Swedish forward Dan Corneliusson is Como's record appearance-maker among foreign players.

List of Como 1907 players with at least 100 appearances
Player	Nationality	Position	Como career	Appearances	Goals	Ref.
Antonio Cetti	Italy	HB	1920–1941	278	91	
Renato Preziati	Italy	FW	1923–1925 1926–1933	165	48	
Cesare Butti	Italy	FB	1925–1938	247	5	
Amedeo Lissi	Italy	GK	1926–1933	137	0	
Plinio Farina	Italy	HB	1926–1933	146	0	
Michele Moretti	Italy	FB	1927–1935	165	0	
Marco Romano	Italy	FW	1928–1934 1941–1942	101	71	
Guido Quadri	/ Italy	FB	1940–1946 1951–1954	163	11	
Piero Maronati	/ Italy	HB	1941–1951	210	7	
Riccardo Alberto Villa	Italy	FB	1946–1950	104	6	
Luigi Bosco	Italy	FB	1947–1951	104	1	
Alfredo Travia	Italy	FB	1947–1951	137	1	
Alceo Lipizer	Italy	HB	1947–1952	101	30	
Benito Meroni	Italy	HB	1948–1951	102	38	
Ercole Rabitti	Italy	HB	1948–1952	116	35	
Franco Pedroni	Italy	HB	1948–1952	144	2	
Vittorio Ghiandi	Italy	FW	1949–1954	114	41	
Umberto Pinardi	Italy	FW	1949–1952 1960–1961	115	8	
Angelo Turconi	Italy	HB	1950–1954; 1955–1960	106	21	
Giuseppe Baldini	Italy	FW	1951–1953; 1955–1960	165	57	
Franco Stefanini	Italy	FW	1951–1953; 1957–1963	147	35	
Aldo Fontana	Italy	HB	1956–1962	125	9	
Bruno Ballarini	Italy	DF	1958–1970	350	21	
Antonio Ghelfi	Italy	DF	1959–1962 1969–1971	145	0	
Luigi Paleari	Italy	DF	1965–1973	276	0	
Franco Vannini	Italy	MF	1968–1971 1972–1974	138	16	
Claudio Correnti	Italy	MF	1969–1978	313	6	
Doriano Pozzato	Italy	MF	1969–1976 1978–1981	247	22	
Roberto Melgrati	Italy	DF	1970–1972 1973–1980	254	2	
Adriano Lombardi	Italy	MF	1971–1972 1974–1975	156	7	
Alessandro Scanziani	Italy	MF	1973–1977 1973–1980	109	21	
Silvano Fontolan	Italy	DF	1974–1978 1979–1983	284	10	
Villiam Vecchi	Italy	GK	1976–1981	131	0	
Gianfranco Matteoli	Italy	MF	1976–1979 1982–1985	111	10	
Enrico Todesco	Italy	FW	1976–1979 1983–1989	208	24	
Marco Nicoletti	Italy	FW	1977–1983 1983–1991	155	35	
Giancarlo Centi	Italy	MF	1977–1981 1983–1991	335	3	
Massimo Mancini	Italy	MF	1978–1983	156	4	
Giuliano Giuliani	Italy	GK	1980–1985	155	0	
Giuseppe Maria Butti	Italy	MF	1981–1985 1986–1987	101	9	
Luca Fusi	Italy	MF	1981–1986	147	6	
Stefano Borgonovo	Italy	FW	1981–1986 1986–1988	116	22	
Antonio Tempestilli	Italy	DF	1981–1987	190	5	
Massimo Albiero	Italy	DF	1981–1987 1983–1989	212	8	
Giovanni Invernizzi	Italy	MF	1981–1989	129	3	
Stefano Maccoppi	Italy	DF	1982–1990	202	11	
Pasquale Bruno	Italy	DF	1983–1987	134	2	
Egidio Notaristefano	Italy	MF	1983–1990	130	12	
Enrico Annoni	Italy	DF	1983–1990	110	2	
Dan Corneliusson	Sweden	FW	1984–1989	133	21	
Martio Paradisi	Italy	GK	1985–1989	143	0	
Salvatore Giunta	Italy	MF	1986–1990	103	16	
Giacomo Gattuso	Italy	DF	1989–1995 1997–1999	203	1	
Mauro Bressan	Italy	MF	1991–1994 2003–2005	203	1	
Mario Manzo	Italy	DF	1992–1995 2000–2001	128	7	
Massimiliano Ferrigno	Italy	MF	1992–1997 1998–2004	177	24	
Roberto Galia	Italy	MF	1994–1998	154	8	
Andrea Ardito	Italy	MF	1999–2002 2009–2015	225	1	
Alex Brunner	Italy	GK	1999–2003	141	0	
Cristian Stellini	Italy	DF	2000–2002	112	4	
Oscar Brevi	Italy	DF	2000–2003 2008–2009	130	4	
Cesare Ambrosini	Italy	DF	2007–2008 2011–2016	151	0	
Alessio Cristiani	Italy	MF	2013–2017	103	16	
Giovanni Fietta	Italy	MF	2013–2017	107	3	
Simone Andrea Ganz	Italy	FW	2014–2016 2019–2020	107	42	
Manuel Cicconi	Italy	MF	2016–2019	110	18	
Edoardo Bovolon	Italy	MF	2017–2022	129	3	
Alessandro Gabrielloni	Italy	FW	2018–	215	64	
Alessio Iovine	Italy	MF	2019–	141	7	
Alessandro Bellemo	Italy	MF	2019–	173	13	
Tommaso Arrigoni	Italy	MF	2020–2024	105	8	

== Club captains ==
List of A.C. Como club captains
Dates	Player	Nationality	Notes
1961–1970	Bruno Ballarini	Italy	
1970–1972	Luigi Paleari	Italy	
1972–1978	Claudio Correnti	Italy	
1978–1979	Roberto Melgrati	Italy	
1979–1981	Adriano Lombardi	Italy	
1981–1983	Silvano Fontolan	Italy	
1983–1991	Giancarlo Centi	Italy	
1991–1993	Paolo Annoni	Italy	
1993–1995	Giacomo Gattuso	Italy	
1995–1997	Roberto Galia	Italy	
1997–2000	Massimiliano Ferrigno	Italy	
2000–2002	Oscar Brevi	Italy	
2002–2003	Cristian Stellini	Italy	
2003–2005	Mauro Bressan	Italy	
2005–2006	Aldo Monza	Italy	
2006–2007	Marco Sgrò	Italy	
2007–2008	Roberto Cau	Italy	
2008–2009	Oscar Brevi (2)	Italy	
2009–2011	Michele Franco	Italy	
2011–2012	Orlando Urbano	Italy	
2012–2015	Andrea Ardito	Italy	
2015–2016	Antonio Giosa	Italy	
2016–2017	Giovanni Fietta	Italy	
2017–2018	Davide Sentinelli	Italy	
2018–2019	Federico Gentile	Italy	
2019–2020	Silvano Raggio Garibaldi	Italy	
2020–2021	Luca Crescenzi	Italy	
2021–2024	Alessandro Bellemo	Italy	
2025–	Lucas Da Cunha	France	
