= 2002–03 Como Calcio season =

Como Calcio
2002–03 season
- Manager: Loris Dominissini; Eugenio Fascetti
- Stadium: Stadio Giuseppe Sinigaglia
- Serie A: 17th
- Coppa Italia: Second round
- Top goalscorer: Nicola Amoruso (6); Fabio Pecchia (6)

During the 2002–03 Italian football season, Como Calcio competed in the Serie A.

== Season summary ==
Como Calcio finished the season in 17th position in the Serie A table and they relegated back to Serie B. In other competitions, Como reached the second round of the Coppa Italia.

Nicola Amoruso and Fabio Pecchia was the top scorer for Como with 6 goals in all competitions.

== Squad ==
=== Goalkeepers ===
- (Italy) Alex Brunner
- (Italy) Fabrizio Ferron
- (Italy) Stefano Layeni

=== Defenders ===
- (Italy) Daniele Gregori
- (Italy) Niccolo Guzzo
- (Brazil) Juárez de Souza Teixeira
- (Italy) Pasquale Padalino
- (Italy) Cristian Stellini
- (Italy) Massimo Tarantino
- (Croatia) Stjepan Tomas

=== Midfielders ===
- (Italy) Riccardo Allegretti
- (Italy) Mirko Benin
- (Italy) Jonatan Binotto
- (France) Benoît Cauet
- (Italy) Nicola Corrent
- (Bosnia and Herzegovina) Vedin Musić
- (Italy) Fabio Pecchia
- (Italy) Marco Rossi

=== Attackers ===
- (Italy) Nicola Amoruso
- (Italy) Luigi Anaclerio
- (Italy) Nicola Caccia
- (Italy) Benito Carbone
- (Colombia) Jorge Horacio Serna

== Serie A ==
Pos	Team	Pld	W	D	L	GF	GA	GD	Pts	Qualification or relegation
14	Reggina	34	10	8	16	38	53	−15	38 (Note: Modena finished ahead of Empoli, Atalanta and Reggina on head-to-head points: Modena: 10 pts, Empoli: 9 pts, Atalanta: 7 pts, Reggina: 5 pts.)	Relegation tie-breaker
15	Atalanta (R)	34	8	14	12	35	47	−12	38	Serie B after tie-breaker (Note: Atalanta to 2003–04 Serie B after tie-breaker.)
16	Piacenza (R)	34	8	6	20	44	62	−18	30	Relegation to Serie B
17	Como (R)	34	4	12	18	29	57	−28	24	Relegation to Serie B
18	Torino (R)	34	4	9	21	23	58	−35	21	Relegation to Serie B

Source: 2002–03 Serie A, Soccerway
Rules for classification: 1) Points; 2) Head-to-head points; 3) Head-to-head goal difference; 4) Goal difference; 5) Goals scored; 6) Draw. (Note: Head-to-head record is used only after all the matches between the teams in question have been played).
(R) Relegated
