= Roberto Melgrati =

Italian footballer

Personal information
- Full name: Roberto Melgrati
- Date of birth: 19 February 1947
- Place of birth: Cormano, Italy
- Date of death: 30 January 2024 (aged 76)
- Height: 1.75 m (5 ft 9 in)
- Position: Full-back

Youth career
- –1966: Legnano

Senior career*
Years	Team	Apps	(Gls)
1966–1970	Legnano	114	(2)
1970–1972	Como	50	(0)
1972–1973	Perugia	27	(0)
1973–1980	Como	204	(2)
1980–1983	Chiasso	49	(0)

Managerial career
- 1984–1984: Pro Patria
- Corbetta
- 2007: Chiasso
- * Club domestic league appearances and goals

Roberto Melgratti (Italian pronunciation: [roˈbɛrto melˈɡratti]; 19 February 1947 – 30 January 2024) was an Italian footballer who played as a defender.

== Career ==
Born in Cormano, Melgrati began his career in Legnano's youth system until promotion to the first team in 1966. He played four seasons with them until 1970 in Serie C, making 114 appearances and scoring two goals.

In the 1970–71 season, he moved to Como, which competed in Serie B, and played two seasons there before moving to Perugia in 1972. In the following year, Melgrati returned to Como and played seven seasons there, where he played almost full-time in all competitions, making 254 appearances in the championship – the sixth most in Como's history.

In 1980, after Como returned to Serie A, he moved to Chiasso to play in the Lega Nazionale A, the top tier of Swiss football league, and made a total of 49 appearances.

In his career he made 22 appearances in Serie A, with one goal in a historic 3–0 win over Inter on 16 November 1975, also with 224 appearances and one goal in Serie B.

In 1984, Melgrati started his career as a football coach with Pro Patria after retiring as a player. He coached the club for three seasons until 1987.

== Honours ==
=== Player ===
Como

- Serie B: 1979–80
- Serie C1: 1978–79 (Girone A)
