= Lipizer =

Surname list

Lipizer is a surname. Notable people with the surname include:

- Rodolfo Lipizer (1895–1974), Italian/Austro-Hungarian violinist
- Alceo Lipizer (1921–1990), Italian footballer
