= Bruno Ballarini =

Italian footballer (1937-2015)

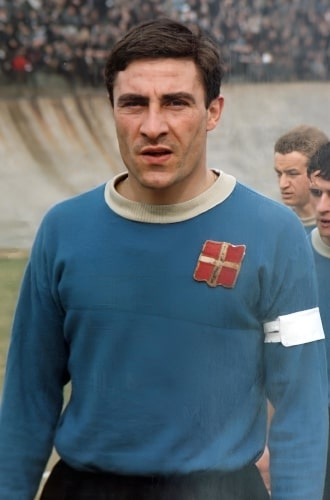
- Ballarini with Como between 1960 and 1963

Personal information
- Full name: Bruno Ballarini
- Date of birth: 18 April 1937
- Place of birth: Milan, Kingdom of Italy
- Date of death: 17 January 2015 (aged 77)
- Place of death: Como, Italy
- Position: Libero

Senior career*
Years	Team	Apps	(Gls)
1956–1957	Rovereto	23	(11)
1957–1958	Verona	0	(0)
1958–1970	Como	350	(21)
1971–1972	Chiasso	4	(0)

Managerial career
- 1971–1972: Chiasso
- * Club domestic league appearances and goals

Bruno Ballarini (Italian pronunciation: [ˈbruːno ballaˈriːni]; 18 April 1937 – 17 January 2015) was an Italian footballer who played as a defender.

== Career ==
Born in Milan, Ballarini started his football career with Rovereto in 1956, where he played as midfielder. He spent one season there, scoring 11 goals in 23 appearances. In the 1957–58 season, he moved to Serie A club Hellas Verona, but did not play a single match during his time there. In the 1958–59 season, he moved to Como, where then-coach Hugo Lamanna used him in a defensive role as a libero. He played in the Como team that won twelve consecutive championships, seven in Serie B and five in Serie C, and was also the club captain. He holds the official appearance record for Como with 350 appearances.

At the end of his career, Ballarini was player-coach of FC Chiasso in the 1971–1972 Swiss Challenge League season.

== Honours ==
=== Player ===
Como

- Serie C: 1967–68
