= Alfredo Mazzoni =

Italian footballer and coach (1908-1986)

Personal information
- Date of birth: 23 February 1908
- Place of birth: Carpi, Italy
- Date of death: 27 July 1986 (aged 78)
- Height: 1.79 m (5 ft 10 1/2 in)
- Position: Midfielder

Senior career*
Years	Team	Apps	(Gls)
1924–1931	Modena	151	(55)
1931–1934	Genova 1893	95	(27)
1934–1935	Ambrosiana-Inter	5	(0)
1935–1936	Modena	34	(12)
1936–1938	Roma	20	(3)
1938–1939	Reggiana	32	(7)
1939–1942	Ravenna	70	(21)
1942–1943	Budrio	14	(0)
1943–1944	Modena	3	(0)

Managerial career
- 1950–1951: Vicenza
- 1951: Como
- * Club domestic league appearances and goals

Alfredo Mazzoni (23 February 1908 — 27 July 1986) was an Italian professional football player and coach.
