= Claudio Correnti =

Italian footballer and manager (born 1941)

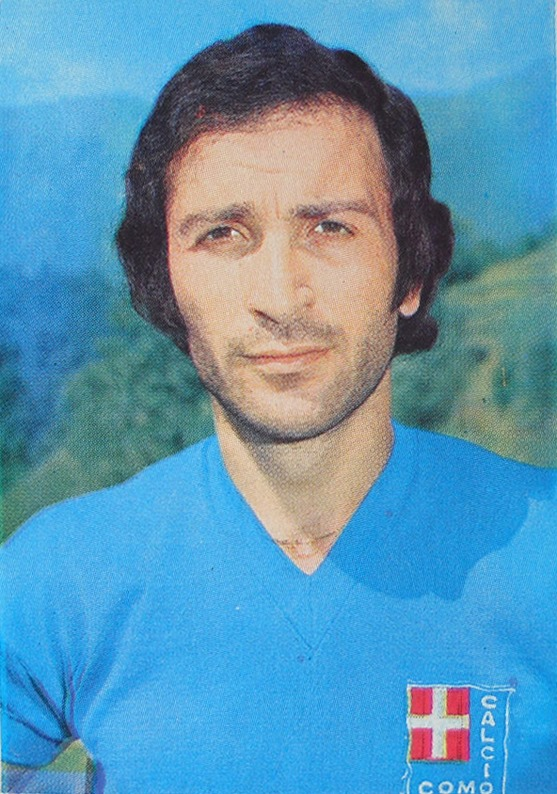
- Correnti with Como in 1974

Personal information
- Full name: Claudio Correnti
- Date of birth: 12 March 1941
- Place of birth: Orzinuovi, Lombardy, Kingdom of Italy
- Position: Midfielder

Youth career
- –1960: Crema

Senior career*
Years	Team	Apps	(Gls)
1959–1960	Crema	33	(?)
1960–1964	Reggiana	70	(4)
1964–1965	Mantova	14	(0)
1965–1966	Reggiana	26	(1)
1966–1969	Bari	98	(1)
1969–1978	Como	313	(6)
- * Club domestic league appearances and goals

Claudio Correnti (Italian pronunciation: [ˈklaudjo korˈrɛnti]; born 12 March 1941) was an Italian professional football manager and former player who played as a midfielder.

== Career ==
Born in Orzinuovi, Correnti played for Crema, Mantova, Reggiana, Bari and for a long time in Como, where he ended his career as captain of the club in the 1977–78 season.

In Serie A, he made 46 appearances and 1 goal with Mantova, Bari and Como (in the last match in the top division, Como's draw against Lazio, the last day of the 1975–76 season). In Serie B, he made 370 appearances and 8 goals.
