= Osian Roberts =

Welsh football coach and former player (born 1965)

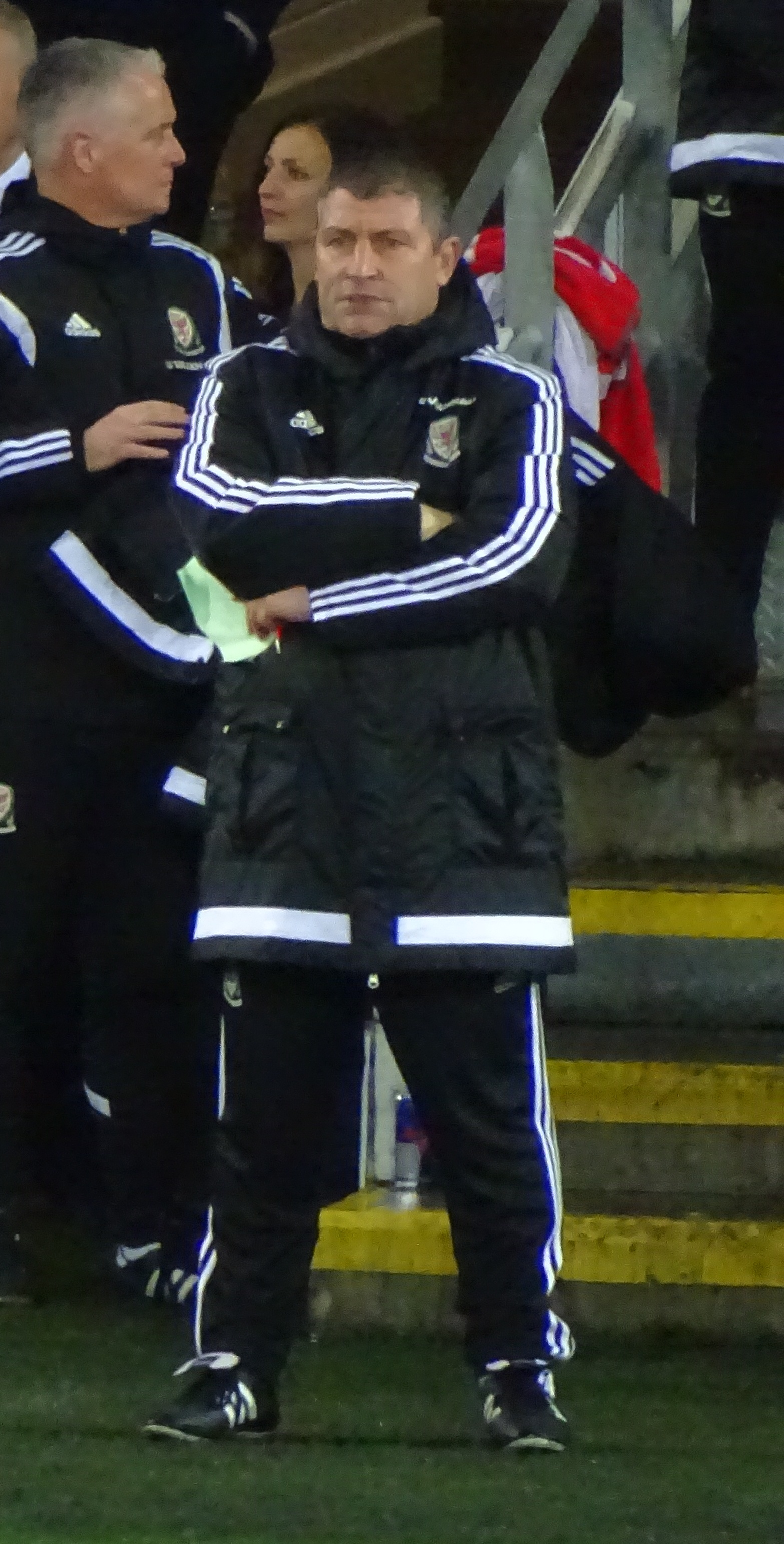
- Roberts in 2015

Personal information
- Date of birth: 18 August 1965 (age 61)
- Place of birth: Anglesey, Wales
- Position: Central midfielder

Team information
- Current team: Como (head of development)

College career
Years	Team	Apps	(Gls)
1985–1988	Furman Paladins		

Senior career*
Years	Team	Apps	(Gls)
- Bangor City
1984–1985	Bethesda Athletic		
- Llangefni Town
1989–1990	New Mexico Chiles		

Managerial career
- 1990: New Mexico Chiles
- 1996–1999: Wales U16
- 1996–1999: Wales U18
- 1999: Wales B
- 1999–2007: Porthmadog
- 2023–2024: Como (interim)
- * Club domestic league appearances and goals

Osian Roberts (Welsh pronunciation: [ˈɔʃan]; born 18 August 1965) is a Welsh football coach and former player who is the head of development of Serie A club Como. In 2014, he was described in the media as "the most influential man in Welsh football".

== Early life ==
Roberts was born on Anglesey, and was brought up in Bodffordd on the island.

== Career ==
Roberts was a central midfielder, and captained the Welsh Schools side. He played in north Wales for Bangor City, Bethesda Athletic and Llangefni Town, before moving to the United States at the age of 19 after receiving a scholarship to attend Furman University. At Furman, he was named Southern Conference player of the year in 1986 and 1988. He later played in the American Professional Soccer League for the New Mexico Chiles, where he was player-manager.

After returning to Wales, he became Anglesey Football Development Officer in 1991.

In June 2007, Roberts resigned as manager of Porthmadog to take up the position of Football Association of Wales technical director. He has also coached the Wales under-16, Wales under-18 and Wales B teams, as well as helping coach the women's under-17 team. In 2014, he was the subject of documentary series called Byd Pêl-droed Osian Roberts; it was shown on S4C.

On 21 July 2015, Roberts was promoted to assistant manager of the Wales national team under team manager Chris Coleman. Coleman resigned the manager role in November 2017 and Roberts stated that he wished to become the new national team manager. Roberts was retained as assistant manager following the appointment of Ryan Giggs as Wales manager.

On 1 August 2019, it was announced that Roberts had become technical director of the Morocco national team. He resigned in July 2021.

In August 2021, he became assistant manager to Patrick Vieira at Crystal Palace. Vieira was sacked by Crystal Palace in March 2023 with Roberts and other coaching staff also being released.

In December 2023, Italian club Como announced the appointment of Roberts as their new caretaker coach until the end of the 2023–24 Serie B season, replacing Cesc Fàbregas, who had also been caretaker; Roberts also served as head of development for the club. He eventually guided the club to promotion to Serie A after 21 years by finishing in second place. Fàbregas returned to the role in July 2024.

== Managerial statistics ==
As of match played 10 May 2024

Managerial record by team and tenure
Team	From	To	Record				
Team	From	To	G	W	D	L	Win %
Como (caretaker)	20 December 2023	15 July 2024	21	12	6	3	57.14
Total			21	12	6	3	57.14
