= Plinio Farina =

Italian footballer and manager

Personal information
- Full name: Plinio Farina
- Date of birth: 28 May 1902
- Place of birth: Como, Lombardy, Kingdom of Italy
- Date of death: 13 May 1972 (aged 69)
- Place of death: Italy
- Position: Full-back

Youth career
- –1920: Lombardia

Senior career*
Years	Team	Apps	(Gls)
1920–1924	Esperia	21	(0)
1924–1926	AC Milan	3	(0)
1926–1933	Como	146	(0)
- * Club domestic league appearances and goals

Plinio Farina (Italian pronunciation: [ˈpliːnjo faˈriːna]; 28 May 1902 – 13 May 1972) was an Italian professional footballer who played as a defender.

== Club career ==
Born and raised in the Municipality of Como, Farina began his football career in the youth team of A.C. Lombardia Como, a team affiliated to the ULIC (Unione Libera Italiana del Calcio, an independent federation from the F.I.G.C.). Farina then moved to Esperia, a team also based in Como that had been playing at federal level since 1920, having previously also been part of the ULIC.

With Esperia, he reached the national semi-finals of the 1920–21 Prima Categoria, after winning the Lombard championship title. Farina was one of the key players in Esperia's rapid rise and established himself the following season by playing in 21 more games in the Prima Divisione. Subsequently, the club's fortunes declined and a 1923 relegation saw Esperia return to the Seconda Divisione.

He then moved to AC Milan and played in 3 games in the 1924–25 Prima Divisione season.

In 1926 he was hired by Comense (now Como). He played there for seven seasons, the last two of which were in Serie B. In the 1930–31 season he was part of the club's great history by winning the Prima Divisione without suffering a single defeat throughout the season.

== Style of play ==
Farina was a full-back praised by the Como press for his speed and tactical intelligence, as well as for the class and strength that earned him the nickname "torello" (little bull).

== Honours ==
=== Como ===
- Prima Divisione: 1930–31
