= Federico Gentile (footballer) =

Italian footballer

Personal information
- Date of birth: 27 January 1985 (age 41)
- Place of birth: Rome, Italy
- Height: 1.80 m (5 ft 11 in)
- Position: Midfielder

Senior career*
Years	Team	Apps	(Gls)
2003–2004	Ostiamare	12	(1)
2004–2007	Rieti	90	(14)
2007–2008	Valenzana	28	(3)
2008–2009	Civitavecchia	10	(0)
2009–2010	Alghero	36	(1)
2010–2011	Aprilia	23	(9)
2011–2012	Celano	12	(1)
2012–2014	Savona	49	(4)
2014–2016	SPAL	38	(2)
2016–2017	Siena	23	(2)
2017–2019	Como	50	(25)
2019–2021	Foggia	31	(7)
2021	Juventus Fano	16	(2)
2021–2022	Seregno	3	(0)
2022–2023	Chiasso	10	(2)
2023	Alessandria	0	(0)
- * Club domestic league appearances and goals as of 26 November 2022

Federico Gentile (born 27 January 1985) is an Italian former professional footballer and current coach.

== Playing career ==
On 2 November 2021, he joined Serie C club Seregno.

On 7 July 2022, Gentile signed with Chiasso in the third-tier Swiss Promotion League.

On 10 October 2023, Gentile moved to Alessandria.

== Coaching career ==
On 11 December 2023, Alessandria announced Gentile's retirement and successive appointment as an assistant to head coach Sergio Pirozzi. He was dismissed from his role just a month later, on 27 December 2023, together with the entire coaching staff.
