= 1948–49 Serie B =

Italian football league season

Serie B
- Season: 1948–49
- Champions: Como; 1st title

Serie B 1948-49 team distribution

The Serie B 1948–49 was the seventeenth tournament of this competition played in Italy since its creation.

== Teams ==
Salernitana, Alessandria, Vicenza and Napoli had been relegated from Serie A.

== Events ==
Pre-war regulations were restored.

== Final classification ==
Pos	Team	Pld	W	D	L	GF	GA	GR	Pts	Promotion or relegation
1	Como (P, C)	42	25	10	7	83	39	2.128	60	Promotion to Serie A
2	Venezia (P)	42	21	10	11	69	44	1.568	52	Promotion to Serie A
3	Vicenza	42	21	9	12	69	48	1.438	51	
4	Salernitana	42	21	5	16	75	64	1.172	47	
5	Brescia	42	17	11	14	61	50	1.220	45	
5	Napoli	42	17	11	14	43	40	1.075	45	
7	Pro Sesto	42	18	8	16	61	51	1.196	44	
8	Legnano	42	17	8	17	73	66	1.106	42	
8	Pisa	42	17	8	17	63	58	1.086	42	
10	S.P.A.L.	42	16	9	17	72	57	1.263	41	
11	Alessandria	42	17	6	19	70	54	1.296	40	
11	Verona	42	16	8	18	62	73	0.849	40	
11	Siracusa	42	17	6	19	55	70	0.786	40	
11	ArsenalTaranto	42	18	4	20	56	72	0.778	40	
11	Cremonese	42	16	8	18	60	78	0.769	40	
16	Reggiana	42	18	3	21	56	56	1.000	39	
17	Empoli	42	15	8	19	53	76	0.697	38	
18	Spezia	42	12	13	17	49	63	0.778	37	Relegation tie-breaker
19	Parma (R)	42	12	13	17	42	59	0.712	37	Serie C after tie-breaker
20	Lecce (R)	42	14	8	20	57	68	0.838	36	Relegation to Serie C
21	Seregno (R)	42	11	12	19	51	72	0.708	34	Relegation to Serie C
22	Pescara (R)	42	11	12	19	49	71	0.690	34	Relegation to Serie C

Source: Panini
Rules for classification: Note: goal difference was not used in Italy before 1960. Goal average was used instead.
(C) Champions; (P) Promoted; (R) Relegated

=== Results ===
Home \ Away	ALE	ARS	BRE	COM	CRE	EMP	LCE	LEG	NAP	PAR	PES	PIS	PSE	REA	SAL	SER	SIR	SPA	SPE	VEN	HEL	VIC
Alessandria		9–0	1–4	0–3	5–0	5–3	4–0	3–2	3–0	2–2	3–1	0–2	0–2	4–0	2–0	4–1	0–0	4–0	1–0	5–0	1–0	0–0
ArsenalTaranto	2–1		3–1	2–3	0–2	1–0	2–1	4–0	3–0	1–0	1–0	1–1	3–0	1–0	0–0	3–2	6–0	2–0	2–0	1–0	2–1	2–0
Brescia	3–0	2–0		1–0	1–1	1–2	4–0	2–0	1–0	2–0	2–1	5–1	2–0	4–1	1–0	1–1	3–0	2–0	4–0	1–1	1–0	3–1
Como	3–0	2–0	1–0		1–1	1–2	4–0	2–0	1–0	2–0	2–1	5–1	2–0	4–1	1–0	1–1	3–0	2–0	4–0	1–1	1–0	3–1
Cremonese	3–1	1–1	0–2	1–3		3–1	3–2	1–2	0–0	3–2	3–0	1–0	6–3	0–1	3–2	3–1	4–2	1–1	2–1	1–2	2–0	1–0
Empoli	1–0	2–1	3–3	0–0	2–0		4–0	3–2	2–1	2–1	2–2	1–1	0–2	4–3	2–0	2–2	1–0	1–0	1–0	1–1	4–1	0–0
Lecce	0–2	1–0	0–2	1–0	4–0	1–0		2–1	2–3	1–2	1–0	6–0	3–1	1–0	4–0	5–1	1–2	1–1	1–1	1–1	3–1	4–1
Legnano	1–1	0–0	1–1	2–3	4–0	1–0	4–0		1–2	1–1	2–0	4–0	4–0	4–0	0–1	2–2	5–2	3–0	3–2	2–0	2–1	2–0
Napoli	0–0	3–2	2–1	1–0	2–2	2–0	1–0	2–0		1–1	1–1	3–0	2–0	1–0	1–0	2–1	3–0	0–0	0–0	1–0	0–1	1–0
Parma	1–0	1–2	2–1	0–0	0–1	1–0	2–0	0–2	1–0		0–2	1–0	1–0	0–2	1–1	4–2	1–0	4–3	1–1	1–0	1–0	0–1
Pescara	0–0	2–1	0–0	2–2	1–1	7–0	2–1	1–3	1–1	1–1		0–1	1–1	4–2	0–0	2–0	1–0	2–1	1–0	0–1	4–1	0–0
Pisa	1–2	1–0	2–0	3–3	1–2	2–0	1–0	4–1	0–0	4–1	3–1		3–2	2–1	3–1	0–1	6–2	6–0	5–0	1–0	2–2	1–2
Pro Sesto	1–0	3–0	2–0	2–5	3–1	6–0	3–1	2–0	0–0	3–0	1–0	1–0		3–1	1–0	3–1	1–1	0–0	6–0	1–0	1–0	0–0
Reggiana	0–2	4–0	0–0	3–1	2–0	0–1	3–0	3–1	1–0	1–1	1–0	3–0	2–1		2–0	4–0	2–1	0–1	4–1	0–1	1–2	2–0
Salernitana	3–1	2–1	2–1	4–1	6–2	5–2	2–0	1–0	1–1	2–0	8–2	1–1	3–2	3–0		1–0	2–0	3–0	4–1	2–0	3–0	4–0
Seregno	1–0	3–1	0–1	0–3	0–0	1–1	1–1	1–1	2–1	2–1	2–2	1–1	1–0	0–0	2–1		4–0	4–0	2–2	1–2	2–0	0–1
Siracusa	1–0	3–1	2–0	2–1	2–1	4–3	6–2	4–1	1–0	3–1	3–0	1–0	1–0	1–0	3–0	2–3		2–1	0–1	0–0	2–2	0–1
SPAL	3–1	4–0	1–0	0–2	4–1	3–0	0–0	6–2	1–0	5–0	7–0	0–1	0–0	3–1	8–1	2–1	2–0		1–1	1–3	4–0	5–0
Spezia	2–0	3–1	2–0	0–0	3–1	2–1	1–1	2–1	2–0	1–1	3–0	2–0	1–1	0–2	2–3	2–0	2–2	1–1		0–0	2–1	1–1
Venezia	2–1	6–1	1–0	1–1	2–2	5–0	1–1	1–1	3–2	1–0	1–2	2–1	2–1	3–0	3–1	7–0	2–0	1–0	3–2		3–1	2–0
Hellas Verona	4–1	3–1	2–2	2–2	2–1	1–0	1–1	2–3	3–1	1–1	2–1	1–0	3–2	0–3	5–1	1–0	0–0	3–1	2–1	3–2		4–3
Vicenza	4–1	4–1	3–0	2–1	3–0	4–1	1–2	5–1	2–0	1–1	6–2	2–2	0–0	2–0	3–0	1–1	4–0	1–0	2–1	2–1	4–1	

Source: Almanacco Illustrato del Calcio - La Storia 1898–2004, Panini Edizioni, Modena, September 2005 (in Italian)
Legend: Blue = home team win; Yellow = draw; Red = away team win.

== Relegation tie-breaker ==
Played in Milan on July 10:

Team 1	Score	Team 2
Parma	1–4	Spezia

Parma relegated to Serie C.

== References and sources ==
- Almanacco Illustrato del Calcio - La Storia 1898–2004, Panini Edizioni, Modena, September 2005
