= Carlo Perrone (footballer, born July 1960) =

Italian footballer and manager (born 1960)

Personal information
- Date of birth: July 8, 1960 (age 66)
- Place of birth: Padua, Italy
- Height: 1.70 m (5 ft 7 in)
- Position: Midfielder

Youth career
- Lanerossi Vicenza

Senior career*
Years	Team	Apps	(Gls)
1977–1979	Padova	20	(0)
1979–1983	Lanerossi Vicenza	86	(10)
1979–1980	Empoli	20	(2)
1983–1984	Triestina	31	(2)
1984–1987	Campobasso	105	(14)
1987–1990	Bari	71	(11)
1990–1994	Atalanta	115	(15)
1994–1995	Padova	21	(0)

Managerial career
- 2009–2010: Piovese
- 2012: Novara
- 2016–2018: Piovese
- 2018–2019: Giorgione
- 2020–2021: Castelbaldo Masi
- 2021–2022: Olhanense
- 2022–2023: Abano
- * Club domestic league appearances and goals

Carlo Perrone (born 8 July 1960) is an Italian footballer and manager.

== Career ==
=== Playing career ===
A Vicenza youth product, Perrone made his professional debut in 1977 with hometown club Padova. He successively played at Serie B level for many years, then winning promotion to Serie A during his spell with Bari, with whom he debuted in the Italian top flight.

He successively joined Serie A team Atalanta in 1990, with whom he also played at UEFA Cup level. Perrone retired in 1995 after a single season with Padova, then at Serie A level too.

=== Post-playing and coaching career ===
Following his retirement as an active player, Perrone became a chief scout for Venezia between 1997 and 1999, then filling the same duty at Verona between 1999 and 2001. He then served as director of football for Südtirol before turning into a coaching career.

After some experiences as a youth coach for Padova and Cittadella, Perrone took over as manager of Eccellenza amateurs Piovese in 2009. He successively joined Novara as an assistant coach, also acting as a co-head coach (together with Giacomo Gattuso) in 2012. He then returned into amateur level management with Eccellenza clubs Piovese, Giorgione and Castelbaldo Masi.

In July 2021, he was unveiled as the new head coach of S.C. Olhanense, succeeding Edgar Davids in the job. In summer 2022, he was appointed head coach of Italian amateur club Abano, serving until March 2023.
