= Alceo Lipizer =

Italian footballer (1921-1990)

Personal information
- Date of birth: April 8, 1921
- Place of birth: Fiume, Free State of Fiume
- Date of death: September 4, 1990 (aged 69)
- Position: Midfielder

Senior career*
Years	Team	Apps	(Gls)
1938–1942	Fiumana	38	(5)
1942–1943	Taranto	17	(11)
1945–1947	Juventus	6	(0)
1947–1952	Como	101	(28)
1952–1954	Reggiana	30	(7)
- * Club domestic league appearances and goals

Alceo Lipizer (April 8, 1921 – September 4, 1990) is a retired Italian professional football player. He was born in Fiume.

== Honours ==
U.S. Fiumana

- Serie C: 1940-41

Como

- Serie B: 1948-49
