= Luigi Paleari =

Italian footballer (1941–2021)

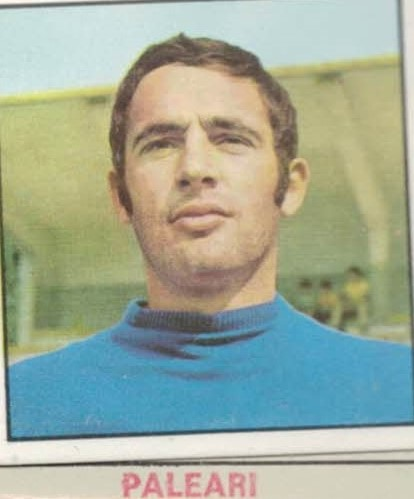

Personal information
- Date of birth: 8 November 1941
- Place of birth: Italy
- Date of death: 2 August 2021 (aged 79)
- Position: Defender

Senior career*
Years	Team	Apps	(Gls)
- Falck Arcore
1964–1965	Fanfulla		
1965–1973	Como		
- * Club domestic league appearances and goals

Luigi Paleari (8 November 1941 – 2 August 2021) was an Italian professional footballer who played as a defender for Falck Arcore, Fanfulla and Como. For Como he made 264 appearances between 1965 and 1973, ranking him in eighth place on the club's all-time list.
