= Massimiliano Ferrigno =

Italian footballer

Personal information
- Full name: Massimiliano Ferrigno
- Date of birth: 27 January 1974
- Place of birth: Gela, Italy
- Position: Midfielder

Senior career*
Years	Team	Apps	(Gls)
1992–1997	Como	81	(14)
1997	Brescello	9	(1)
1997–1998	Acireale	28	(3)
1998–2000	Como	22	(0)
2004	Como	22	(0)
2004–2005	Perugia	16	(2)
- * Club domestic league appearances and goals

Massimiliano Ferrigno (Italian pronunciation: [massimiˈljaːno ferˈriɲɲo]; born 27 January 1974) was an Italian professional footballer who played as a midfielder.

== Career ==
Ferrigno made his professional debut for Como in 1992–93 Serie C1 season. In 1994, he achieved promotion to Serie B with the club, and relegated back to Serie C1 the following year. In early 1997, Ferrigno moved to Brescello and midway through the year moved to Acireale, who also competed in Serie C1. In 1998, he returned to Como, was named captain and played three more seasons in Serie C1 with them.

In the 2000–01 season, which saw Como promoted to Serie B at the end of the season, he was involved in an incident midway through the season. On 19 November 2000, after a home match against Modena at Stadio Giuseppe Sinigaglia which ended 1–0 to Como, he attacked Modena's player, Francesco Bertolotti – who was also his former teammate at Brescello, in the dressing room. Bertolotti then fell, causing his head to hit the ground, and ended up in a coma. Bertolotti underwent a complicated surgical operation – with the installation of an intracranial metal plate, and remained in a coma for 9 days – then was hospitalized for a long time. Due to the side effects of the trauma, Bertolotti stopped playing football.

The Serie C disciplinary commission imposed a three-year ban on Ferrigno, until 31 December 2003. The case also saw him go to trial, where at the trial he pleaded guilty to the tragedy and was given a 10-month suspended prison sentence, and monetary compensation in favor of Bertolotti.

After serving all the punishments given to him, Ferrigno returned to playing football for Como in 2004. Como competed in Serie B after relegation from Serie A in the 2002–03 season, where he played in 22 league matches with Como. The following season, after Como was relegated to Serie C1, he moved to Perugia until ending his contract with the club in January 2005 and retiring from football. In his career, he has made 66 appearances and scored 4 goals in Serie B.

== Personal life ==
In 2011, after retiring from football, he founded the HS Marketing group which operates in the field of sports marketing. In 2023, he also became the marketing and sales director of Treviso Basket.

== Honours ==
=== Como ===
- Coppa Italia Serie C: 1996–97
