= 1949–50 Serie C =

Italian football league season

The 1949–50 Serie C was the twelfth edition of Serie C, the third highest league in the Italian football league system.

To reduce the groups into an 18-team formula, additional relegations were added during the season. However, the plan was later partially postponed.

== Legend ==
Promoted
Relegated

== Girone A ==
Northwest Italy

Pos	Team	Pld	Pts
1	Seregno	42	55
2	Mortara	42	55 (Note: Renounced to play the promotion tie-breaker.)
3	Sanremese	42	52
4	Crema	42	52
5	Monza	42	51
6	Pavia	42	50
7	Savona	42	48
8	Casale	42	48
9	Varese	42	47
10	Gallaratese	42	45
11	Villasanta	42	41
12	Fossanese	42	40
13	Omegna	42	40
14	Biellese	42	40
15	Sestrese	42	40
16	Luino	42	37
17	Pro Vercelli	42	37 (Note: Relegated after tie-breaker (Luino-Pro Vercelli 1-0), but later readmitted for sport merits.)
18	Rivarolese	42	36
19	Pro Lissone	42	30
20	Vogherese	42	29
21	Asti	42	28
22	Parabiago	42	23

== Girone B ==
Northeast Italy

Pos	Team	Pld	Pts
1	Treviso	40	52
2	Parma	40	51
3	Marzoli Palazzolo	40	49
4	Libertas Trieste	40	48
5	Marzotto	40	48
6	Vita Nova	40	47
7	Piacenza	40	47
8	Sandonà	40	45
9	Mantova	40	43
10	Edera	40	41
11	Rimini	40	40
12	Cesena	40	39
13	Bolzano	40	39
14	Mestrina	40	38
15	Pro Gorizia	40	38
16	Luparense	40	38 (Note: Relegated after tie-breakers: Luparense-Pro Gorizia 1-1; Pro Gorizia-Mestrina 1-1; Mestrina-Luparense 2-0)
17	Imolese	40	36
18	Pro Rovigo	40	30
19	Sebinia Lovere	40	27
20	Bondenese	40	26
21	Baracca Lugo	40	18

== Girone C ==
Central Italy

Pos	Team	Pld	Pts
1	Anconitana	40	58
2	Piombino	40	56
3	Sambenedettese	40	49
4	Siena	40	49
5	Maceratese	40	46
6	Cagliari	40	45
7	Jesina	40	44
8	Carrarese	40	42
9	Arezzo	40	42
10	Carbosarda	40	40
11	Pistoiese	40	40
12	Rosignano Solvay	40	40
13	Le Signe	40	40
14	Grosseto	40	39
15	Latina	40	39
16	Perugia	40	38 (Note: Relegated and later readmitted to Serie C.)
17	Pescara	40	36
18	Tivoli	40	33
19	Monsummanese	40	30
20	Ternana	40	17
21	Vigor Fucecchio	40	16 (Note: 1 point deducted.)

== Girone D ==
Southern Italy

Pos	Team	Pld	Pts
1	Messina	34	51 (Note: Promoted after tie-breaker: Messina-Cosenza 1-1; repetition: 6-1)
2	Cosenza	34	51
3	Reggina	34	47
4	Lecce	34	43
5	Arsenale Messina	34	37
6	Crotone	34	36
7	Benevento	34	36
8	Brindisi	34	34
9	Foggia	34	32
10	Torrese	34	32
11	Catanzaro	34	31
12	Acireale	34	31
13	Stabia	34	30
14	Igea Virtus	34	29 (Note: Relegated and later readmitted to Serie C.)
15	Marsala	34	28 (Note: Relegated and later readmitted to Serie C.)
16	Nocerina	34	26
17	Drepanum	34	21
18	Juve Alfa Pomigliano	34	16 (Note: 1 point deducted.)
