= 1936–37 Prima Divisione =

The 1936–37 First Division was the second edition of Regional Prima Divisione, the highest amatorial league in the Italian football league system.

== Lombardy ==
=== Group A ===
Pos	Team	Pts	Pld	W	D	L	GF	GA	GD	Qualification
1	Cremonese B	24	17	10	4	3	41	17	+24	
2	Galbani	23	18	9	5	4	43	35	+8	To the finals
3	Caravaggio	23	18	9	5	4	36	26	+10	
4	FIAT Milano	21	18	9	3	6	40	36	+4	Disbanded
5	Atalanta B	20	17	7	6	4	43	23	+20	Disbanded
6	Brescia B	19	16	7	5	4	38	31	+7	
7	Tresoldi	13	17	6	1	10	29	44	−15	
7	Ardens Bergamo	13	18	5	3	10	27	45	−18	
9	Crema B	11	17	5	1	11	25	34	−9	
10	Trevigliese	7	18	3	1	14	14	45	−31	

=== Group B ===
Pos	Team	Pts	Pld	Qualification
1	Isotta Fraschini	29	0	To the finals
2	Pirelli	23	0	
3	Pavia	21	0	
4	Redaelli	20	0	
5	Fanfulla B	20	0	
6	Codogno	18	0	
7	Vogherese	17	0	Disbanded
8	Bressana	15	0	
9	Bronese	12	0	
10	Piacenza B	5	0	

=== Group C ===
Pos	Team	Pts	Pld	Qualification
1	Alfa Romeo	29	0	To the finals
2	S.A.F.F.A.	21	0	
3	Bernocchi	19	0	
4	Vigevano B	18	0	
5	Stelvio	17	0	
6	Varese B	15	0	
7	Bollatese	12	0	Disbanded
8	Alleanza	9	0	
9	Montello	4	0	
10	Minerva	0	0	Disbanded

== Group D ==
Pos	Team	Pts	Pld	W	D	L	GF	GA	GD	Qualification
1	Caratese	26	18	12	2	4	35	28	+7	To the finals
2	La Folgore	23	18	10	3	5	36	18	+18	
2	Como	23	18	10	3	5	33	22	+11	
4	Ernesto Breda	20	18	8	4	6	38	29	+9	
5	Seregno B	18	18	7	4	7	32	31	+1	
6	Falck B	17	18	7	3	8	26	22	+4	
7	Ardita	17	18	6	5	7	32	33	−1	Merged into Como
8	Lecco B	14	18	5	4	9	21	37	−16	
9	Monza B	11	18	1	9	8	17	29	−12	
10	Pro Lissone	11	18	4	3	11	19	40	−21	Suspended

=== Finals ===
Pos	Team	Pts	Pld
1	Isotta Fraschini	8	0
2	Galbani	7	0
3	Alfa Romeo	6	0
4	Caratese	3	0

Following a championship reform, the finals were annulled and all the clubs were promoted.
