= Dani Guindos =

Spanish football manager

Personal information
- Full name: Daniel Guindos López
- Date of birth: 19 April 1984 (age 42)
- Place of birth: Gijón, Spain

Team information
- Current team: Como (assistant)

Youth career
- Sporting Gijón

Senior career*
Years	Team	Apps	(Gls)
- La Braña
–2002	Llano 2000		

Managerial career
- Atlético Madrid (youth)
- 2013–2014: Alcorcón (youth)
- 2014–2018: Real Madrid (youth)
- 2018–2019: Alcorcón B
- 2019: Equatorial Guinea
- 2019–2020: AS Monaco (assistant)
- 2021–2022: Granada (assistant)
- 2021–2022: Como (assistant)
- 2024–: Como (assistant)
- * Club domestic league appearances and goals

Daniel "Dani" Guindos López (born 19 April 1984) is a Spanish professional football coach and former player.

== Club career ==
Born on 19 April 1984 in Gijón, Spain, Guindos began his youth career at Sporting Gijón aged nine. After several years, Guindos played senior football at La Braña, before joining Llano 2000.

== Managerial career ==
Guindos started his managerial career with the youth team of Real Madrid. Guindos became the head coach of AD Alcorcón B in 2018, staying there one season. In October 2019 he was appointed coach of Equatorial Guinea, becoming the youngest head coach to date. He was dismissed on 7 November 2019. After that, he became an assistant coach of Robert Moreno at AS Monaco FC.
