= Giacomo Gattuso =

Italian footballer and manager

Personal information
- Date of birth: 14 June 1968 (age 58)
- Place of birth: Como, Italy
- Height: 1.81 m (5 ft 11 1/2 in)
- Position: Defender

Youth career
- Como

Senior career*
| Years | Team | Apps | (Gls) |
| 1986–1988 | Como | 0 | (0) |
| 1988–1989 | SPAL | 10 | (0) |
| 1989–1995 | Como | 160 | (1) |
| 1995–1996 | Salernitana | 10 | (0) |
| 1996–1997 | Saronno | 23 | (0) |
| 1997–1999 | Como | 24 | (0) |
| 1999 | Catania | 4 | (0) |
| 1999–2001 | Novara | 47 | (0) |
| 2001–2002 | Canzese | 3 | (0) |

Managerial career
- 2002–2004: Canzese
- 2004–2005: Novara
- 2005–2006: Como
- 2007: Novara
- 2012: Novara
- 2014: Novara
- 2020–2022: Como
- 2023–2025: Novara
- 2026: Renate
- * Club domestic league appearances and goals

Giacomo Gattuso (born 14 June 1968) is an Italian professional football manager and a former player.

== Career ==
=== Playing career ===
Gattuso's playing career has been mostly associated with his hometown club Como, with whom he played up to Serie B level. He also played at the Serie B level for Salernitana.

=== Coaching career ===
Following his retirement as an active player, Gattuso stayed at amateur side Canzese, his final club as a footballer, as their head coach.

He then joined Novara's coaching staff and served short stints as head coach between 2004 and 2005. He then joined then-Serie D club as their new head coach for the 2005–2006 season before returning to Novara as a youth coach.

In 2012 he was named co-head coach (together with Carlo Perrone) of Novara before being moved back in charge of the Under-19 team weeks later due to poor results. He also served again as Novara's head coach in 2014 in the relegation playoff second leg against Varese.

In June 2020, he returned to Como as an assistant coach, being promoted to head coach in December 2020 following the dismissal of Marco Banchini. Under his tenure, Como's results improved considerably, with the club ending the season as Serie C Group A winners, thus achieving promotion to Serie B.

After guiding Como throughout the 2021–22 Serie B campaign, Gattuso was confirmed in charge for the 2022–23 season but was shortly afterwards forced to relinquish his working duties at the club due to health issues. On 8 September 2022, Como formally announced that Gattuso required an extended leave of absence; therefore, they were considering hiring a new head coach as a replacement. On 20 September 2022, Gattuso was formally replaced by Moreno Longo as permanent head coach.

On 16 October 2023, Gattuso was hired as the new head coach of Novara in the Serie C league, thus returning once again to his former team as both a player and a manager. After guiding Novara to safety, he agreed on a contract extension until 30 June 2026. He was dismissed from his job on 30 March 2025 following a negative string of results.
