= 1967–68 Serie C =

The 1967–68 Serie C was the thirtieth edition of Serie C, the third highest league in the Italian football league system.

== Girone A ==
Pos	Team	Pld	W	D	L	GF	GA	GD	Pts	Promotion or relegation
1	Como (P)	38	23	11	4	52	17	+35	57	Promoted to Serie B
2	Piacenza	38	18	14	6	44	25	+19	50	
3	Savona	38	18	11	9	45	21	+24	47	
4	Udinese	38	19	8	11	56	34	+22	46	
5	Pro Patria	38	16	9	13	56	40	+16	41	
6	Solbiatese	38	13	15	10	40	27	+13	41	
7	Verbania	38	12	17	9	33	31	+2	41	
8	Legnano	38	13	12	13	29	31	−2	38	
9	Monfalcone	38	10	17	11	38	38	0	37	
10	Entella	38	15	7	16	31	37	−6	37	
11	Alessandria	38	13	11	14	41	51	−10	37	
12	Treviso	38	11	14	13	34	35	−1	36	
13	Marzotto	38	12	12	14	36	38	−2	36	
14	Biellese	38	10	16	12	46	52	−6	36	
15	Triestina	38	9	17	12	25	32	−7	35	
16	Rapallo Ruentes	38	12	10	16	37	46	−9	34	
17	Trevigliese	38	10	14	14	23	34	−11	34	
18	Pavia	38	6	15	17	24	52	−28	27	Relegated to Serie D
19	Bolzano	38	5	16	17	30	53	−23	26	Relegated to Serie D
20	Mestrina	38	6	12	20	25	51	−26	24	Relegated to Serie D

(P) Promoted

== Girone B ==
Pos	Team	Pld	W	D	L	GF	GA	GD	Pts	Promotion or relegation
1	Cesena	38	19	13	6	51	26	+25	51	Promoted to Serie B
2	Prato	38	14	20	4	44	22	+22	48	
3	Spezia	38	17	14	7	48	28	+20	48	
4	Arezzo	38	14	18	6	33	22	+11	46	
5	Sambenedettese	38	16	14	8	36	27	+9	46	
6	Siena	38	16	11	11	43	31	+12	43	
7	Maceratese	38	14	13	11	39	29	+10	41	
8	Del Duca Ascoli	38	14	11	13	32	34	−2	39	
9	Anconitana	38	14	11	13	33	36	−3	39	
10	Torres	38	11	15	12	28	29	−1	37	
11	Vis Pesaro	38	12	12	14	24	26	−2	36	
12	Empoli	38	9	18	11	24	28	−4	36	
13	Massese	38	12	10	16	36	40	−4	34	
14	Jesi	38	8	18	12	28	32	−4	34	
15	Rimini	38	9	16	13	25	38	−13	34	
16	Ravenna	38	9	15	14	31	39	−8	33	
17	Pistoiese	38	11	10	17	33	43	−10	32	
18	Pontedera	38	8	16	14	33	49	−16	32 (Note: Relegated after play-off match played in Lucca against Pistoiese.)	Relegated to Serie D
19	Città di Castello	38	7	12	19	33	48	−15	26	Relegated to Serie D
20	Carrarese	38	5	15	18	28	55	−27	25	Relegated to Serie D

== Girone C ==
Pos	Team	Pld	W	D	L	GF	GA	GD	Pts	Promotion or relegation
1	Ternana	36	19	14	3	39	14	+25	52	Promoted to Serie B
2	Casertana	36	20	11	5	57	22	+35	51	
3	Taranto	36	18	11	7	35	21	+14	47	
4	Lecce	36	17	9	10	37	20	+17	43	
5	Salernitana	36	14	13	9	32	28	+4	41	
6	Pescara	36	14	11	11	36	28	+8	39	
7	Avellino	36	14	10	12	40	36	+4	38	
8	Cosenza	36	11	15	10	29	29	0	37	
9	Internapoli	36	11	14	11	36	33	+3	36	
10	L'Aquila	36	13	10	13	23	28	−5	36	
11	Trapani	36	13	8	15	29	30	−1	34	
12	Massiminiana	36	10	12	14	37	40	−3	32	
13	Nardò	36	8	15	13	29	31	−2	31	
14	Chieti	36	9	13	14	27	34	−7	31	
15	Crotone	36	9	13	14	24	31	−7	31	
16	Barletta	36	10	11	15	24	37	−13	31	
17	Akragas	36	8	13	15	23	42	−19	29	Relegated to Serie D
18	Trani	36	6	14	16	24	50	−26	26	Relegated to Serie D
19	Siracusa	36	6	7	23	27	54	−27	19	Relegated to Serie D

== References and sources ==
- Almanacco Illustrato del Calcio – La Storia 1898–2004, Panini Edizioni, Modena, September 2005
