= Antonio Cetti =

Italian footballer (1900–1980)

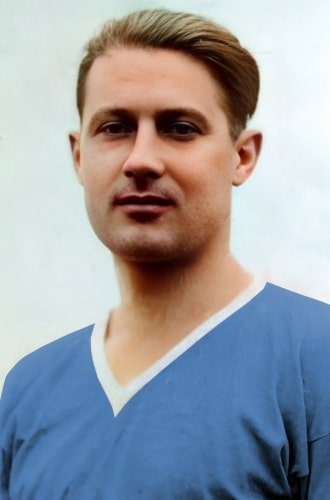
- Cetti with Como in early 1930s

Personal information
- Date of birth: 1 February 1900
- Place of birth: Como, Lombardy, Kingdom of Italy
- Date of death: 10 June 1980 (aged 80)
- Place of death: Como, Italy
- Position: Midfielder

Senior career*
| Years | Team | Apps | (Gls) |
| 1920–1941 | Como | 278 | (91) |

Managerial career
- 1938–1944: Como
- Cantù San Paolo
- * Club domestic league appearances and goals

Antonio Cetti (Italian pronunciation: [anˈtɔːnjo ˈtʃɛtti]; 1 February 1900 – 10 June 1980) was an Italian footballer who played as a midfielder.

== Career ==
Born and raised in Municipality of Como, Cetti (also known as Cetti II, to distinguish him from his brother and Como teammate Franceso Cetti, known as Cetti I) spent his entire football career at Como, where he played for over twenty years.

He still holds the record for goals scored in competitive matches for Como with 91 goals. In terms of appearances for the Como team, he is fourth in the all-time rankings, with 278 competitive games.

In 1938, he also served as head coach of Como which made him a player-coach for the club. After retiring as a player in 1941, he then became full-time coach of Como until 1944 before ending his career as coach of Cantù San Paolo.

== Honours ==
=== Player ===
Como

- Seconda Divisione: 1924–25
- Prima Divisione: 1930–31
