= 2002–03 Serie A =

101st season of top-tier Italian football

Serie A
- Season: 2002–03
- Dates: 14 September 2002 – 24 May 2003
- Champions: Juventus; 27th title
- Relegated: Atalanta; Piacenza; Como; Torino
- Champions League: Juventus; Internazionale; Milan; Lazio
- UEFA Cup: Parma; Udinese; Roma
- Intertoto Cup: Perugia; Brescia
- Matches: 306
- Goals: 789 (2.58 per match)
- Top goalscorer: Christian Vieri (24 goals)
- Biggest home win: Milan 6–0 Torino (6 October 2002)
- Biggest away win: Torino 0–4 Juventus (17 November 2002); Torino 0–4 Parma (1 December 2002); Chievo 0–4 Parma (16 March 2003)
- Highest scoring: Parma 4–3 Brescia (6 November 2002); Empoli 3–4 Internazionale (6 November 2002); Juventus 4–3 Chievo (24 May 2003)
- Longest unbeaten run: Lazio; 16 games
- Longest winless run: Como; 17 games
- Highest attendance: 78,843; Milan v Internazionale
- Lowest attendance: 350; Torino v Udinese

The 2002–03 Serie A (known as the Serie A TIM for sponsorship reasons) was the 101st season of top-tier Italian football, the 71st in a round-robin tournament. It was composed by 18 teams, for the 15th consecutive time from season 1988–89.

The first two teams qualified directly to UEFA Champions League. Teams finishing in third and fourth position had to play Champions League qualifications. Teams finishing in fifth and sixth positions qualified to UEFA Cup (another spot was given to the winner of Coppa Italia). The bottom four teams were to be relegated in Serie B.

Juventus won its 27th national title, with Internazionale placing second and Milan third. Lazio was admitted to the UEFA Champions League preliminary phase, whereas Parma, Udinese and Roma (through the Coppa Italia finals) obtained a spot to the next UEFA Cup. Brescia and Perugia were admitted to participate in the UEFA Intertoto Cup, after Chievo declined to participate.

Piacenza, Torino, Como and Atalanta were relegated to Serie B, with the latter after having lost a relegation play-off against Reggina.

== Rule changes ==
Unlike La Liga, which imposed a quota on the number of non-EU players on each club, Serie A clubs could sign as many non-EU players as available on domestic transfer. But for the 2003–04 season a quota was imposed on each of the clubs limiting the number of non-EU, non-EFTA and non-Swiss players who may be signed from abroad each season, following provisional measures introduced in the 2002–03 season, which allowed Serie A & B clubs to sign only one non-EU player in the 2002 summer transfer window.

== Teams ==
Eighteen teams competed in the league – the top fourteen teams from the previous season and the four teams promoted from the Serie B. The promoted teams were Como, Modena, Reggina and Empoli. Como, Modena, Reggina and Empoli returned to the top flight after an absence of thirteen, thirty-eight, one and three years respectively. They replaced Hellas Verona and Lecce (both teams relegated after a three-years presence), Fiorentina (relegated after eight season in top fight), and Venezia (relegated after a season's presence).

== Managerial changes ==
Team	Outgoing manager	Manner of departure	Date of vacancy	Position in table	Incoming manager	Date of appointment
Udinese	(Italy) Giampiero Ventura	End of contract	30 June 2002	Pre-season	(Italy) Luciano Spalletti	1 July 2002
Reggina	(Italy) Franco Colomba	End of contract	30 June 2002	Pre-season	(Italy) Bortolo Mutti	1 July 2002
Piacenza	(Italy) Walter Novellino	End of contract	30 June 2002	Pre-season	(Italy) Andrea Agostinelli	1 July 2002
Parma	(Italy) Pietro Carmignani	End of contract	30 June 2002	Pre-season	(Italy) Cesare Prandelli	1 July 2002
Lazio	(Italy) Alberto Zaccheroni	End of contract	30 June 2002	Pre-season	(Italy) Roberto Mancini	1 July 2002
Torino	(Italy) Giancarlo Camolese	Sacked	25 October 2002	16th	(Italy) Renato Zaccarelli (caretaker)	26 October 2002
Torino	(Italy) Renato Zaccarelli	End of caretaker spell	29 October 2002	17th	(Italy) Renzo Ulivieri	30 October 2002
Reggina	(Italy) Bortolo Mutti	Sacked	7 November 2002	16th	(Italy) Luigi De Canio	8 November 2002
Como	(Italy) Loris Dominissini	Sacked	25 November 2002	18th	(Italy) Eugenio Fascetti	25 November 2002
Piacenza	(Italy) Andrea Agostinelli	Sacked	3 February 2003	16th	(Italy) Luigi Cagni	3 February 2003
Torino	(Italy) Renzo Ulivieri	Sacked	24 February 2003	17th	(Italy) Renato Zaccarelli	24 February 2003
Torino	(Italy) Renato Zaccarelli	Sacked	15 April 2003	18th	(Italy) Giacomo Ferri	15 April 2003
Atalanta	(Italy) Giovanni Vavassori	Sacked	21 April 2003	15th	(Italy) Giancarlo Finardi	21 April 2003

== Personnel and sponsoring ==
Locations of the 2002–03 Serie A teams

Team	Chairman	Head coach	Kit manufacturer	Shirt sponsor
Atalanta	(Italy) Ivan Ruggeri	(Italy) Giancarlo Finardi	(Japan) Asics	Promatech
Bologna	(Italy) Renato Cipollini	(Italy) Francesco Guidolin	(Italy) Macron	Area Banca
Brescia	(Italy) Luigi Corioni	(Italy) Carlo Mazzone	(United Kingdom) Umbro	Banca Lombarda
Chievo	(Italy) Luca Campedelli	(Italy) Luigi Del Neri	(Spain) Joma	Paluani
Como*	(Italy) Enrico Preziosi	(Italy) Eugenio Fascetti	(Italy) Erreà	Temporary
Empoli*	(Italy) Fabrizio Corsi	(Italy) Silvio Baldini	(Italy) Erreà	Sammontana
Internazionale	(Italy) Massimo Moratti	(Argentina) Héctor Cúper	(United States) Nike	Pirelli
Juventus	(Italy) Vittorio Chiusano	(Italy) Marcello Lippi	(Italy) Lotto	Fastweb/Tamoil (in UEFA matches)
Lazio	(Italy) Sergio Cragnotti (Italy) Ugo Longo	(Italy) Roberto Mancini	(Germany) Puma	Siemens Mobile
Milan	(Italy) Silvio Berlusconi	(Italy) Carlo Ancelotti	(Germany) Adidas	Opel
Modena*	(Italy) Romano Amadei	(Italy) Gianni De Biasi	(Italy) Erreà	Immergas
Parma	(Italy) Stefano Tanzi	(Italy) Cesare Prandelli	(United States) Champion	Parmalat
Perugia	(Italy) Luciano Gaucci	(Italy) Serse Cosmi	(Italy) Galex	Toyota
Piacenza	(Italy) Fabrizio Garilli	(Italy) Luigi Cagni	(Italy) Lotto	LPR Brakes
Reggina*	(Italy) Pasquale Foti	(Italy) Luigi De Canio	(Japan) Asics	Caffè Mauro
Roma	(Italy) Francesco Sensi	(Italy) Fabio Capello	(Italy) Kappa	Mazda
Torino	(Italy) Attilio Romero	(Italy) Giacomo Ferri	(Japan) Asics	Ixfin
Udinese	(Italy) Franco Soldati	(Italy) Luciano Spalletti	(France) Le Coq Sportif	Bernardi

(*) Promoted from Serie B.

== League table ==
Pos	Team	Pld	W	D	L	GF	GA	GD	Pts	Qualification or relegation
1	Juventus (C)	34	21	9	4	64	29	+35	72	Qualification to Champions League group stage
2	Internazionale	34	19	8	7	64	38	+26	65	Qualification to Champions League group stage
3	Milan (Note: Milan qualified for the Champions League group stage as defending champions.)	34	18	7	9	55	30	+25	61	Qualification to Champions League group stage
4	Lazio	34	15	15	4	57	32	+25	60	Qualification to Champions League third qualifying round
5	Parma	34	15	11	8	55	36	+19	56 (Note: Parma finished ahead of Udinese on head-to-head points: Udinese 1–1 Parma, Parma 3–2 Udinese.)	Qualification to UEFA Cup first round
6	Udinese	34	16	8	10	38	35	+3	56	Qualification to UEFA Cup first round
7	Chievo	34	16	7	11	51	39	+12	55	
8	Roma (Note: Roma qualified for the first round of the 2003-04 UEFA Cup as Coppa Italia runner-up because the winner, Milan, qualified for Champions League through championship position.)	34	13	10	11	55	46	+9	49	Qualification to UEFA Cup first round
9	Brescia	34	9	15	10	36	38	−2	42 (Note: Brescia finished ahead of Perugia on head-to-head points: Brescia 3–1 Perugia, Perugia 0–0 Brescia.)	Qualification to Intertoto Cup second round
10	Perugia (Note: Perugia gained entry to the 2003 UEFA Intertoto Cup after Chievo renounced; then they qualified to the 2003–04 UEFA Cup First round.)	34	10	12	12	40	48	−8	42	Qualification to Intertoto Cup third round
11	Bologna	34	10	11	13	39	47	−8	41	
12	Modena	34	9	11	14	30	48	−18	38 (Note: Modena finished ahead of Empoli, Atalanta and Reggina on head-to-head points: Modena: 10 pts, Empoli: 9 pts, Atalanta: 7 pts, Reggina: 5 pts.)	
13	Empoli	34	9	11	14	36	46	−10	38	
14	Reggina	34	10	8	16	38	53	−15	38	Relegation tie-breaker
15	Atalanta (R)	34	8	14	12	35	47	−12	38	Serie B after tie-breaker (Note: Atalanta to 2003–04 Serie B after tie-breaker.)
16	Piacenza (R)	34	8	6	20	44	62	−18	30	Relegation to Serie B
17	Como (R)	34	4	12	18	29	57	−28	24	Relegation to Serie B
18	Torino (R)	34	4	9	21	23	58	−35	21	Relegation to Serie B

Source: 2002–03 Serie A, Soccerway
Rules for classification: 1) Points; 2) Head-to-head points; 3) Head-to-head goal difference; 4) Goal difference; 5) Goals scored; 6) Draw. (Note: Head-to-head record is used only after all the matches between the teams in question have been played).
(C) Champions; (R) Relegated

== Results ==
Home \ Away	ATA	BOL	BRE	CHV	COM	EMP	INT	JUV	LAZ	MIL	MOD	PAR	PER	PIA	REG	ROM	TOR	UDI
Atalanta		2–2	2–0	1–0	2–1	2–2	1–1	1–1	0–1	1–4	1–3	0–0	0–2	2–0	1–1	2–1	2–2	0–0
Bologna	2–3		3–0	1–1	1–0	2–0	1–2	2–2	0–2	0–2	3–0	2–1	2–1	1–0	0–2	2–1	2–2	1–0
Brescia	3–0	0–0		0–0	1–1	0–2	0–1	2–0	0–0	1–0	2–2	1–1	3–1	1–2	2–1	2–3	1–0	1–1
Chievo	4–1	0–0	1–2		2–0	1–0	2–1	1–4	1–1	3–2	2–0	0–4	3–0	3–1	2–1	0–0	3–2	3–0
Como	1–1 (Note: The match was played at Stadio Giglio.)	5–1	1–1	2–4		0–2	0–2	1–3 (Note: The match was played at Stadio Leonardo Garilli.)	1–3	1–2	0–0	2–2 (Note: The match was played at Stadio Leonardo Garilli.)	1–1	1–1	1–1	2–0 (Note: The match was played at Stadio Leonardo Garilli.)	1–0	0–2 (Note: The match was abandoned due to Como fans rioting against a third penalty for Udinese in the match. Following previous misses by Vincenzo Iaquinta and Roberto Muzzi; David Pizarro was set to take the third one, but the riots ended the match prematurely. Udinese was handed the win 2–0, with Pinzi as the only goalscorer. Como was given a four-match suspension from playing at home.)
Empoli	0–0	0–0	0–0	2–1	0–0		3–4	0–2	1–2	1–1	1–0	0–2	1–1	3–1	4–2	1–3	1–1	1–1
Internazionale	1–0	2–0	4–0	2–1	4–0	3–0		1–1	1–1	0–1	2–0	1–1	2–2	3–1	3–0	3–3	1–0	1–2
Juventus	3–0	1–1	2–1	4–3	1–1	1–0	3–0		1–2	2–1	3–0	2–2	2–2	2–0	5–0	2–1	2–0	1–0
Lazio	0–0	1–1	3–1	2–3	3–0	4–1	3–3	0–0		1–1	4–0	0–0	3–0	2–1	0–1	2–2	1–1	2–1
Milan	3–3	3–1	0–0	0–0	2–0	0–1	1–0	2–1	2–2		2–1	2–1	3–0	2–1	2–0	1–0	6–0	1–0
Modena	0–2	3–2	0–0	1–0	1–1	1–1	0–2	0–1	0–0	0–3		2–1	1–1	1–0	2–1	1–1	2–1	0–1
Parma	2–1	1–2	4–3	0–1	2–0	2–0	1–2	1–2	2–1	1–0	1–1		2–2	3–2	2–0	3–0	1–0	3–2
Perugia	1–0	1–1	0–0	1–0	3–0	1–3	4–1	0–1	2–2	1–0	2–0	1–2		0–0	2–0	1–0	2–1	0–2
Piacenza	2–0	3–1	1–4	0–3	0–1	1–2	1–4	0–1	2–3	4–2	3–3	1–1	5–1		2–2	1–1	1–0	2–0
Reggina	1–1	1–0	2–2	1–1	4–1	1–0	1–2	2–1	0–3	0–0	0–1	0–0	3–1	3–1		2–3	2–1	3–2
Roma	1–2	3–1	0–0	0–1	2–1	3–1	2–2	2–2	1–1	2–1	1–2	2–1	2–2	3–0	3–0		3–1	4–1
Torino	1–1	2–1	0–2	1–0	0–0	1–1 (Note: The match was played at Stadio Giglio.)	0–2	0–4	0–1	0–3	1–1	0–4	2–1 (Note: The match was played at Stadio Giglio.)	1–3 (Note: The match was played at Stadio Ennio Tardini.)	1–0 (Note: The match was played at Stadio Giglio.)	0–1		0–1 (Note: The match was played at Stadio Giglio.)
Udinese	1–0	0–0	0–0	2–1	3–2	2–1	2–1	0–1	2–1	1–0	2–1	1–1	0–0	2–1	1–0	2–1	1–1	

Source: lega-calcio.it (in Italian)
Legend: Blue = home team win; Yellow = draw; Red = away team win.

== Overall ==
- Most wins - Juventus (21)
- Fewest wins - Como and Torino (4)
- Most draws - Lazio and Brescia (15)
- Fewest draws - Piacenza (6)
- Most losses - Torino (21)
- Fewest losses - Juventus and Lazio (4)
- Most goals scored - Juventus and Internazionale (64)
- Fewest goals scored - Torino (23)
- Most goals conceded - Piacenza (62)
- Fewest goals conceded - Juventus (29)

== Relegation tie-breaker ==
29 May 2003
20:30 CEST

Reggina	0–0	Atalanta

Stadio Oreste Granillo, Reggio Calabria
Attendance: 27,000
Referee: Massimo de Santis (Rome)

2 June 2003
18:00 CEST

Atalanta	1–2	Reggina
Natali 18'		Cozza 33'; Bonazzoli 85'

Stadio Atleti Azzurri d'Italia, Bergamo
Attendance: 25,000
Referee: Pierluigi Collina (Viareggio)

Reggina won 2 – 1 on aggregate.

Atalanta relegated to Serie B.

== Top goalscorers ==
Rank	Player	Club	Goals
1	(Italy) Christian Vieri	Internazionale	24
2	(Romania) Adrian Mutu	Parma	18
3	(Italy) Filippo Inzaghi	Milan	17
4	(Italy) Alessandro Del Piero	Juventus	16
6	(Brazil) Adriano	Parma	15
6	(Argentina) Claudio López	Lazio	15
8	(Italy) Dario Hübner	Piacenza	14
8	(Italy) Francesco Totti	Roma	14
10	(Italy) Antonio Di Natale	Empoli	13

== Transfer ==
- Summer Transfer
- Winter Transfer
- co-ownership
- co-ownership

== Attendances ==
#	Club	Avg. attendance	Highest
1	Internazionale	61,943	76,660
2	AC Milan	61,534	78,843
3	AS Roma	57,160	74,313
4	SS Lazio	44,129	69,877
5	Juventus FC	39,771	57,762
6	Bologna FC	24,489	36,178
7	Reggina Calcio	24,102	26,640
8	ChievoVerona	16,902	34,544
9	Udinese Calcio	16,859	26,694
10	Parma AC	16,306	25,603
11	Brescia Calcio	15,739	22,039
12	Atalanta BC	15,483	23,647
13	Torino FC	14,870	32,947
14	Modena FC	14,291	16,227
15	AC Perugia	10,311	22,020
16	Empoli FC	9,127	18,700
17	Piacenza Calcio	8,198	15,029
18	Como 1907	7,320	12,452

== References and sources ==
- Almanacco Illustrato del Calcio - La Storia 1898-2004, Panini Edizioni, Modena, September 2005
