= 1979–80 Serie B =

Italian football league season

Serie B
- Season: 1979–80
- Champions: Como; 2nd title

Serie B 1979-80 team distribution

The Serie B 1979–80 was the forty-eighth tournament of this competition played in Italy since its creation.

== Teams ==
Como, Parma, Matera and Pisa had been promoted from Serie C, while Vicenza, Hellas Verona and Atalanta had been relegated from Serie A.

== Final classification ==
Pos	Team	Pld	W	D	L	GF	GA	GD	Pts	Promotion or relegation
1	Como (P, C)	38	16	16	6	33	17	+16	48	Promotion to Serie A
2	Pistoiese (P)	38	12	22	4	36	23	+13	46	Promotion to Serie A
3	Brescia (P)	38	17	11	10	39	27	+12	45	Promotion to Serie A
4	Cesena	38	12	19	7	39	32	+7	43	
5	Lanerossi Vicenza	38	13	16	9	49	37	+12	42	
5	Monza	38	15	12	11	40	38	+2	42	
7	Sampdoria	38	10	21	7	33	27	+6	41	
8	S.P.A.L.	38	10	19	9	33	32	+1	39	
9	Atalanta	38	11	16	11	29	24	+5	38	
9	Palermo	38	12	14	12	35	32	+3	38	
9	Genoa	38	11	16	11	33	34	−1	38	
9	Bari	38	9	20	9	26	30	−4	38	
13	Verona	38	12	13	13	25	27	−2	37	
14	Pisa	38	12	12	14	25	24	+1	36	
14	Lecce	38	10	16	12	27	30	−3	36	
16	Taranto	38	12	11	15	24	29	−5	35	
17	Sambenedettese (R)	38	11	12	15	23	31	−8	34	Relegation to Serie C1
18	Ternana (R)	38	10	11	17	26	36	−10	31	Relegation to Serie C1
19	Parma (R)	38	7	13	18	27	49	−22	27	Relegation to Serie C1
20	Matera (R)	38	8	10	20	20	43	−23	26	Relegation to Serie C1

Source: Panini
(C) Champions; (P) Promoted; (R) Relegated

== Results ==
Home \ Away	ATA	BAR	BRE	CES	COM	GEN	LRV	LEC	MAT	MON	PAL	PAR	PSA	PST	SMB	SMP	SPA	TAR	TER	VER
Atalanta	—	0–0	0–1	2–2	0–0	2–0	1–0	2–1	0–1	3–1	0–0	1–0	0–0	0–0	2–0	1–1	0–1	0–0	3–1	1–0
Bari	1–0	—	3–0	1–1	0–0	1–0	2–2	1–0	1–1	2–0	1–1	1–0	2–0	2–2	0–0	0–0	0–0	2–0	0–0	0–0
Brescia	2–1	3–0	—	0–1	1–2	2–1	5–2	2–0	2–0	2–0	2–1	2–1	1–0	2–2	2–0	1–0	0–0	1–0	1–0	1–1
Cesena	2–1	4–1	0–0	—	2–0	1–1	2–2	0–0	2–1	0–0	0–2	1–1	1–1	0–1	2–1	3–1	3–3	0–0	1–0	0–1
Como	1–0	2–0	1–0	0–0	—	2–0	1–1	2–0	2–1	1–1	1–0	1–2	0–0	0–0	2–0	3–0	0–0	1–0	2–0	1–0
Genoa	1–0	0–0	2–0	0–0	1–0	—	0–0	1–1	1–1	2–0	1–1	3–1	1–1	1–1	1–1	0–0	2–2	2–1	1–0	1–0
L.R. Vicenza	1–1	3–0	0–0	0–2	0–0	2–0	—	1–1	1–1	2–2	1–0	3–0	3–0	2–1	1–1	1–1	2–0	0–1	5–1	1–0
Lecce	0–0	0–0	1–0	2–0	0–1	0–0	0–1	—	1–0	1–2	0–0	3–1	1–0	2–2	1–1	0–1	2–0	1–0	2–1	1–1
Matera	0–2	0–1	0–1	1–2	0–0	0–2	0–2	0–0	—	1–2	0–0	1–0	0–1	0–0	1–0	1–1	0–2	1–0	1–0	1–0
Monza	0–1	0–0	1–0	0–1	3–3	0–1	3–2	0–0	2–0	—	2–1	3–2	2–1	1–1	2–0	1–1	1–0	0–0	1–0	0–1
Palermo	1–1	1–1	0–0	1–1	0–0	2–2	0–0	3–0	3–0	0–3	—	2–0	1–0	1–0	0–0	1–0	1–1	0–1	1–0	3–1
Parma	0–0	1–1	2–1	1–1	0–0	1–0	3–2	1–2	1–1	0–1	1–0	—	1–1	1–1	0–0	0–1	1–0	1–1	2–3	1–0
Pisa	1–0	0–0	1–0	2–1	0–1	1–0	4–0	1–0	0–1	3–0	2–0	2–0	—	0–0	1–0	0–1	0–0	0–1	1–1	0–1
Pistoiese	0–1	0–0	1–0	0–0	1–1	1–0	3–2	0–0	3–1	0–0	1–0	0–0	0–0	—	4–1	1–1	0–0	2–1	1–0	1–0
Samb.	1–0	2–1	0–0	1–2	0–1	0–1	0–1	1–0	1–0	1–0	2–0	1–0	1–0	0–0	—	0–0	1–1	1–0	2–0	1–0
Sampdoria	1–1	2–0	2–2	0–0	1–0	3–2	0–0	1–1	0–1	1–1	1–2	5–0	0–0	0–0	1–1	—	1–1	1–0	1–0	2–0
Spal	1–1	1–0	1–1	0–0	1–1	1–0	0–3	2–2	3–1	0–2	1–2	0–0	1–0	0–2	0–0	1–1	—	3–1	2–0	0–0
Taranto	0–0	0–0	0–0	1–0	1–0	2–2	1–0	0–1	1–0	2–0	1–2	2–0	0–1	2–1	2–1	0–0	0–2	—	0–2	1–1
Ternana	1–0	2–1	0–1	0–0	1–0	3–0	0–0	0–0	2–0	1–1	2–1	1–1	0–0	1–1	1–0	0–0	1–0	0–1	—	1–1
Verona	1–1	2–0	0–0	3–1	0–0	0–0	0–0	1–0	1–1	1–2	2–1	1–0	2–0	0–2	1–0	1–0	0–2	0–0	1–0	—

Legend: Blue = home team win; Yellow = draw; Red = away team win.

== Attendances ==
#	Club	Average
1	Bari	22,643
2	Genoa	18,894
3	Hellas	16,257
4	Atalanta	15,862
5	Sampdoria	15,802
6	Vicenza	15,293
7	Pisa	14,909
8	Brescia	13,355
9	Palermo	12,811
10	Taranto	12,592
11	Pistoiese	10,421
12	SPAL	10,372
13	Como	9,667
14	Parma	9,543
15	Ternana	8,256
16	Cesena	8,132
17	Lecce	8,056
18	Sambenedettese	6,720
19	Monza	6,615
20	Matera	6,499

== References and sources ==
- Almanacco Illustrato del Calcio - La Storia 1898-2004, Panini Edizioni, Modena, September 2005

Specific
