= USD Sebinia Alto Sebino =

Italian football team

Sebinia Alto Sebino
- Full name: Unione Sportiva Dilettantistica; Sebinia Alto Sebino
- Nickname: –
- Founded: 1940s
- Dissolved: 2015
- Ground: Stadio Comunale, Lovere, Italy
- Capacity: 200
- Chairman: Sergio Taccolini
- Manager: Sergio Gualeni
- League: Promozione Lombardia/C
Home colours	Away colours

Unione Sportiva Dilettantistica Sebinia Alto Sebino (founded in 1940s and know only as Sebinia) was an Italian football team located in Lovere, between Val Camonica and Lake Iseo, in the province of Bergamo.

The club collapsed in 2015.

Before its dissolution, the club played in the Group C of Promozione (Italian 7th level) but in the past, when it was called Sebinia Lovere, it played two years in Serie C (Italian 3rd level) and three years in Promozione Interregionale (at the time Italian 4th level) during the 1940s and 1950s.

== History ==
The club was founded in the 1940s with the name of Sebinia Lovere. It was begun with the intention to become the most important football team of Lake Iseo.

After World War II, the team played in Serie C in the 1948 season. The season started with the 0–0 against Monza. Sebinia finished 8th but, due to the championship reform, was nevertheless relegated in Promozione Interregionale.
