= Loris Dominissini =

Italian footballer and manager (1961–2021)

Personal information
- Date of birth: 19 November 1961
- Place of birth: Udine, Italy
- Date of death: 4 June 2021 (aged 59)
- Place of death: San Vito al Tagliamento, Italy
- Position: Midfielder

Youth career
- 1979–1980: Udinese

Senior career*
| Years | Team | Apps | (Gls) |
| 1980–1985 | Udinese | | |
| 1981–1982 | → Triestina (loan) | | |
| 1982–1983 | → Pordenone (loan) | | |
| 1985–1986 | Messina | | |
| 1986–1993 | Reggiana | | |
| 1993–1994 | Pistoiese | | |
- Sevegliano
| 1995 | Pro Gorizia | | |

Managerial career
- 1998–1999: Udinese (youth)
- 2000–2002: Como
- 2003: Ascoli
- 2005: Spezia
- 2006: Udinese
- 2006–2007: Pro Patria
- 2009–2010: Reggiana
- 2011–2012: Visé
- * Club domestic league appearances and goals

Loris Dominissini (19 November 1961 – 4 June 2021) was an Italian professional football player and coach.

== Career ==
Born in Udine, Dominissini played as a midfielder for Udinese, Triestina, Pordenone, Messina, Pistoiese, Reggiana, Sevegliano and Pro Gorizia.

After retiring as a player he managed Udinese, Como, Ascoli, Spezia, Pro Patria, Reggiana and Visé.

== Death ==
Dominissini died from COVID-19 during the COVID-19 pandemic in Italy in June 2021.
