= Como 1907 =

Association football club in Italy

Como
- Full name: Como 1907 S.r.l.
- Nicknames: I Lariani (Those from Lake Como); I Biancoblù (The Blue and Whites); I Voltiani (The Voltaics)
- Founded: 25 May 1907; 119 years ago, as Como Foot-Ball Club; 2005; 21 years ago, as Calcio Como; 2017; 9 years ago, as Como 1907
- Stadium: Stadio Giuseppe Sinigaglia
- Capacity: 13,602
- Owner: Djarum Group
- President: Mirwan Suwarso
- Head coach: Cesc Fàbregas
- League: Serie A
- 2025–26: Serie A, 4th of 20
- Website: comofootball.com
Home colours	Away colours	Third colours

Como 1907 (Italian pronunciation: [ˈkɔːmo]) is an Italian professional football club based in Como, Lombardy, that competes in Serie A, the top flight of the Italian football system. Founded in 1907 as Como Foot-Ball Club, the team traditionally plays in royal blue and has hosted home matches at the Stadio Giuseppe Sinigaglia since 1928. The club was acquired in 2019 by the Hartono brothers (Robert Budi Hartono and Michael Bambang Hartono) through Djarum Group. Minority shareholders in the club include head coach Cesc Fàbregas and former international footballer Thierry Henry.

Como made its top-tier debut in the 1913–14 Prima Categoria and remained in the top division until its relegation in 1922. During the 1930–31 Prima Divisione season, head coach Gedeon Eugen Lukács guided the team to promotion to Serie B; Como went undefeated throughout both the regular season and the promotion play-offs, scoring 90 goals and conceding 24 in 32 matches.

In the 2000s, severe financial distress led to consecutive relegations for the club. Como was declared bankrupt in 2004 and excluded from professional league participation. Re-established in Serie D—the top level of non-professional Italian football—the club spent three seasons in the division before earning promotion to Serie C2 in 2007. Following another bankruptcy in 2016, a new corporate entity refounded the club in 2017, re-entering competition in Serie D.

Under the ownership of the Hartono brothers—ranked among the world's wealthiest individuals by Forbes and the richest owners in Italian football—the club climbed back to Serie B before securing promotion to Serie A in 2024, ending a 21-year absence from the top flight. Como finished 10th in their return season. In the 2025–26 season, the club placed 4th, securing qualification for European competition for the first time since participating in the 1980–81 Mitropa Cup and earning its debut appearance in the UEFA Champions League.

== History ==
=== Foundation and early years ===
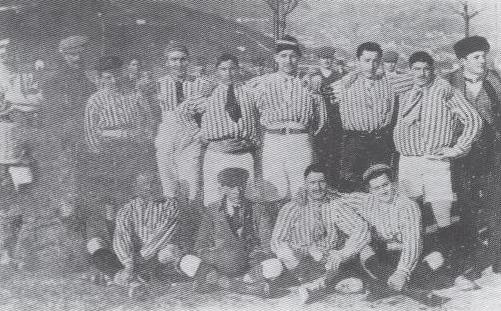
One of the first Como squads, 1910.

The club was founded on 25 May 1907 as Como Foot-Ball Club, by a committee of members gathered at the Taroni bar, located in the central Via Cinque Giornate, the first headquarters of the club. In the first years after its foundation, Como played friendly matches and local tournaments, competing against teams from Milan and Switzerland. On 1 October 1911, the club took part in the inauguration of the Campo via dei Mille by playing in a friendly match, defeating Bellinzona 3–1. Como then used the ground to host their home matches for the next few years.

In 1912, after merging with the student club "Minerva", the club participated in the qualification for entry into the Prima Categoria. On 20 October, in the first round, Como were beaten 3–1 by Savona in Turin. The club was registered in the Lombardy Promozione group, and played its first match on 17 November 1912, a 5–0 win over Brescia at Campo via dei Mille. Their first appearance in top-flight competition came in the 1913–14 Prima Categoria season, after the team was invited to join, and remained there until 1922.

In 1927, Como merged with Esperia and was renamed Associazione Calcio Comense, which won the Coppa Volta in the same year, eliminating Inter 3–0 in the semi-final and beating Genoa 1–0 in the final. In the following year, the club moved their home ground to Stadio Giuseppe Sinigaglia. The stadium was inaugurated on 30 July 1927. Como secured their illustrious history in the 1930–31 Prima Divisione, as Gedeon Lukács led a victorious promotion to Serie B, finishing unbeaten in both the regular season and the play-offs of the Prima Divisione, scoring 90 goals in 32 matches and conceding only 24 goals. The following year, in their first experience of Serie B, Como avoided relegation, finishing in ninth place with a young Marco Romano as their top scorer.

World War II dramatically affected the entire Italian football movement, but Como managed to bounce back. In 1945 when there was no national championship, the club won the Torneo Benefico Lombardo (Tournament for Lombard clubs) which included Milan, Ambrosiana-Inter, Novara and other Lombard clubs. After the war, Como competed in Serie B and spent three years battling for the top spot before finally being promoted to Serie A for the first time in 1949 with Mario Varglien as their coach. Como's first experience in the top division lasted four years, where in their first year, they finished in sixth position with the same points as Torino in fifth. In the following seasons, Como aroused sympathy throughout the peninsula for their choice to field only Italian players in their third year in Serie A. The club also became the sole leader of Serie A for the first time in its history when on 23 September 1951 after the third day of the 1951–52 Serie A season, one point ahead of Inter, Juventus, Milan and Napoli.

=== Mixed times ===
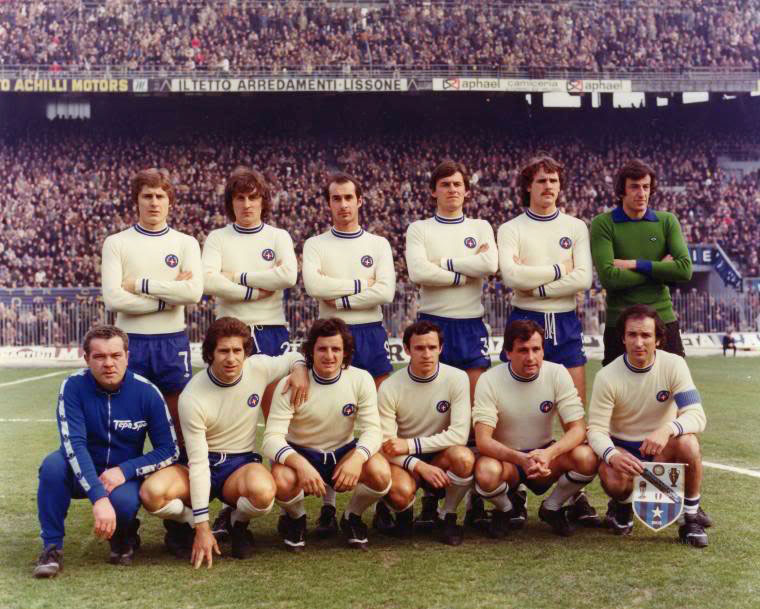
Como's starting line-up in the away defeat against Inter (1–2) in the 1975–76 Serie A season.

In the early 1960s, Como's campaign in the second division had to be stopped following the "Bessi case", a case that began at the start of the 1962–63 Serie B season when the club fielded defender Paolo Bessi for five matches, who had just been bought from Tau Altopascio without knowing that the player had not yet finished serving the disqualification sentence imposed on him by the Tuscany Regional Committee of the Lega Nazionale Dilettanti. After saving themselves on the pitch, Como were punished with five default defeats which saw them relegated to Serie C. In their first year of relegation to Serie C, the club finished third in Group A after a squad completely rejuvenated and renewed by coach Vinicio Viani, with Bruno Ballarini and Giovanni Invernizzi remaining the club's mainstays. After four years in Serie C, promotion finally came in the 1967–68 season when the team finished top of Group A under coach Franco Viviani and still led by historic captain Bruno Ballarini, Como's record appearance holder in the competitive matches.

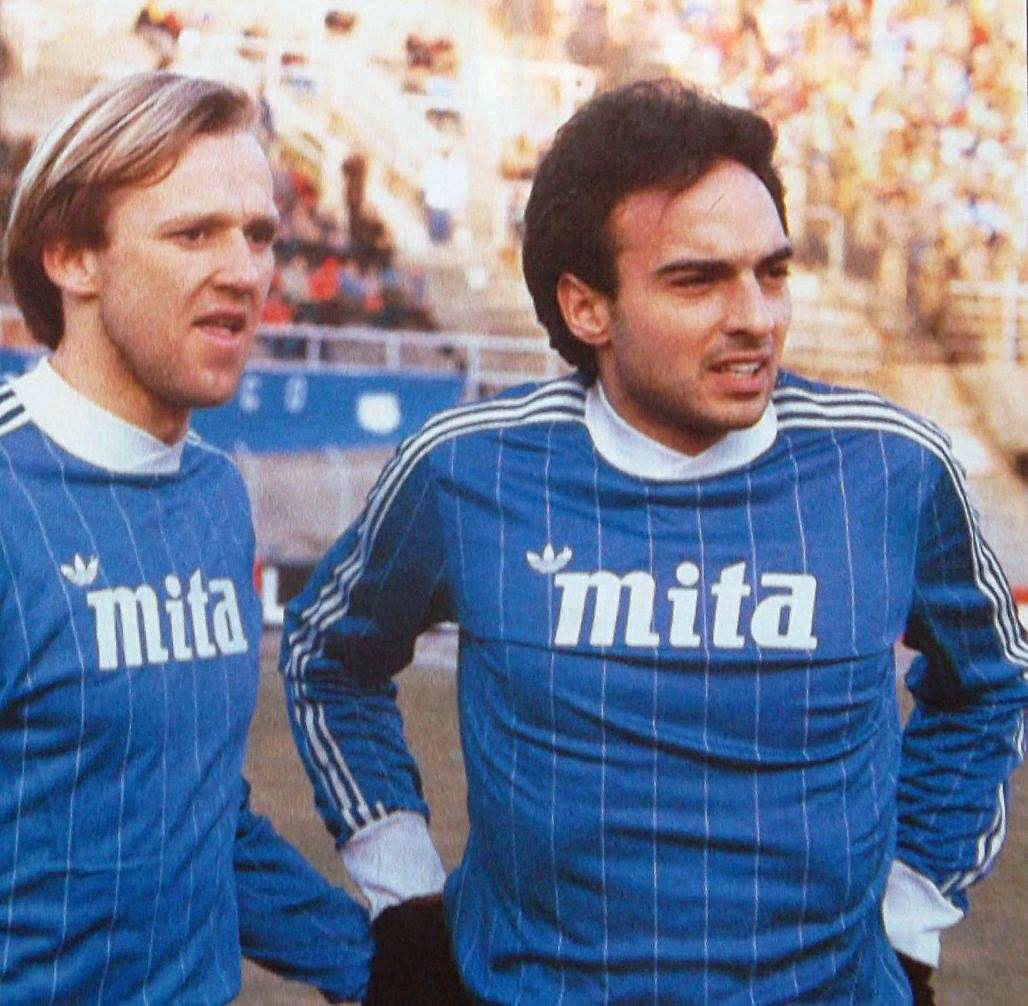
Dan Corneliusson (left) and Hansi Müller (right) playing for Como in the 1984–85 Serie A season.

In the 1973–74 season, following the arrival of Giuseppe Marchioro as coach, Como again fought for promotion with a solid defense of Antonio Rigamonti and Vito Callioni, but the team could only finish in fourth place. The following season, still managed by Marchioro and with the contribution of rising star Marco Tardelli, a second promotion to Serie A arrived, but the team lasted only a season before being relegated back to Serie B. After being relegated to Serie C1 in 1978, Como were once again coached by Marchioro supported by sporting director Lamberti, immediately gaining two consecutive promotions by winning Serie C1 in the 1978–79 season and Serie B in the 1979–80 season with Adriano Lombardi as their best player. They then remained in Serie A for two seasons.

Como managed another promotion to the top flight in 1984, with a five-year stint in Serie A proving to be the club's most successful period. The strikeforce of Dan Corneliusson and Stefano Borgonovo oversaw a 9th-place finish in 1986, which was repeated the following year with far fewer goals scored. The club's defence, led by hard man Pasquale Bruno, proved more than up to the task. Two consecutive relegations to C1 in the 1990s led to a poor decade for Como, who found themselves floating for most of the 1990s in Serie C1. The only exception to those poor years was when they managed to gain promotion to Serie B in the 1994–95 season. Como also won the 1996–97 Coppa Italia Serie C, beating Nocerina in the two-legged final with an aggregate score of 4–2.

=== Bankruptcy and brief promotion to Serie B ===
The 21st century saw Como experience a brief revival. Promotion to Serie B in 2001 was marred by a violent incident following a game against Modena: Como captain Massimiliano Ferrigno punched Modena's Francesco Bertolotti, causing him to fall and hit his head and leaving him in a coma. Ferrigno received a three-year ban and a 10-year suspended jail sentence. Como nonetheless managed promotion to Serie A in the 2002–03 season; however, the return to Serie A proved a major disappointment with the side in the bottom two all season, and a ban on games at the Sinigaglia after crowd violence. Consecutive relegations have caused financial difficulties; in December 2004 the club was declared bankrupt. No investor was successful in taking over the club as the bid from Enrico Preziosi was denied, and thus the company Calcio Como S.p.A. was liquidated. Due to FIGC regulations, a new entity, which was named Calcio Como S.r.l., was granted approval to compete in the 2005–06 Serie D. The liquidator also found former chairman Preziosi had transferred some assets such as the contracts of the players to his new club Genoa, causing the financial failure at Como. In the 2007–08 season, Como won Girone B of Serie D by finishing top of the group, and earned promotion to the fourth-tier, Lega Pro Seconda Divisione. In this season, the club also won the Coppa Italia Serie D after beating Colligiana by an aggregate score of 3–1 in the two-legged final. In 2009, Como finally returned to the third-tier Lega Pro Prima Divisione, by winning the promotion play-offs after defeating Rodengo Saiano with 1–1 aggregate and Alessandria with 4–1 aggregate. In 2015, Como finished fourth in the third-tier. They qualified for the promotion play-offs and earned promotion to Serie B after beating Bassano Virtus by an aggregate score of 2–0 in the two-legged final. They were relegated back down to Lega Pro the following season.

New economic problems arose in the 2016–17 season, forcing the club to be declared out of business and put up for auction. At the fourth auction, the assets of the club were acquired by Akosua Puni Essien, wife of the Ghanaian footballer Michael Essien and who is also the first foreign businesswoman in Italian football (through her company F.C. Como S.r.l.). The Italian Football Federation (FIGC) rejected the application of F.C. Como as Como's successor for the 2017–18 Serie C, as the club did not fulfill all the criteria in Article 52 of NOIF At the start of season, another company, which was named Como 1907 S.r.l., was admitted to the 2017–18 Serie D instead, excising another sub-clause of Article 52.

=== New ownership and return to Serie A ===
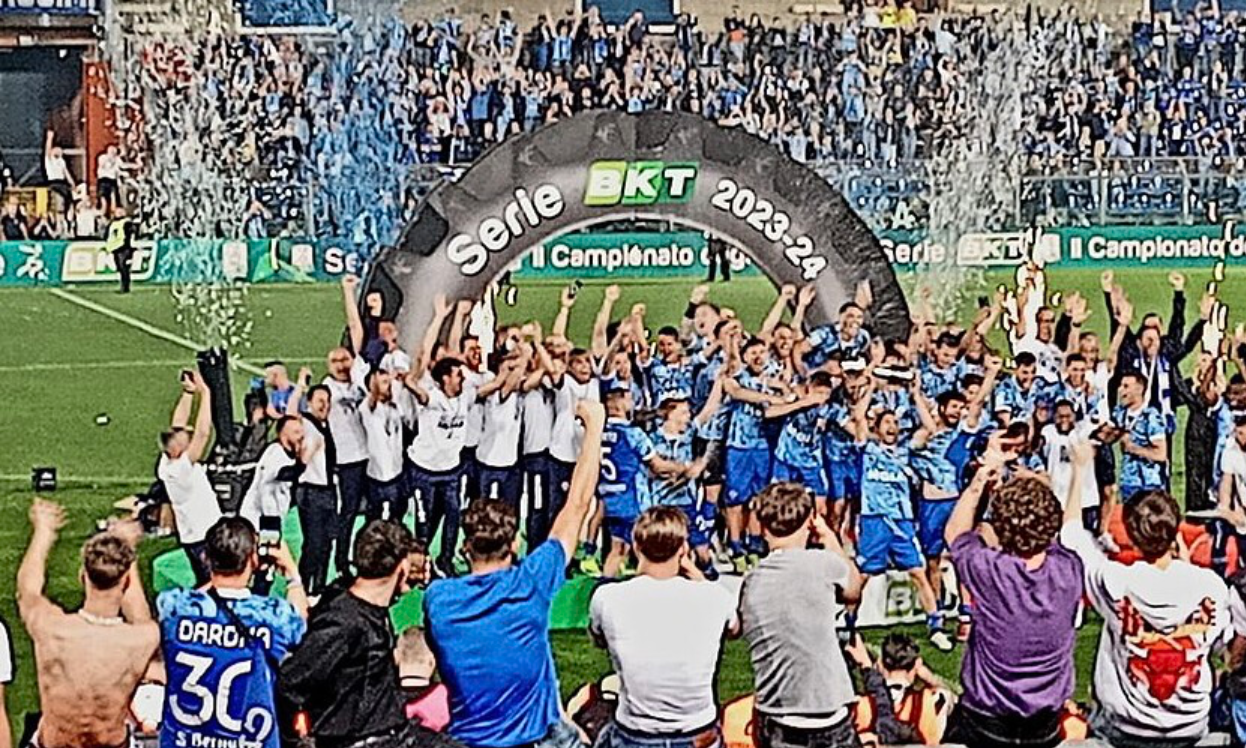
Como players celebrated their first promotion to Serie A after 21 years, following their match against Cosenza on the final matchday of 2023–24 season.

In 2019, the club was acquired by Indonesian tobacco company Djarum Group, led by Robert Budi Hartono and Michael Bambang Hartono, after the club won Girone B of the 2018–19 Serie D despite tobacco advertising being banned in football since 1987. Como returned to professional football that year under the ownership of the brothers, who as of 2022, earn €4 million per hour according to Forbes. From 2021 to 2024, the club was sponsored by Djarum's streaming service subsidiary, Mola. In 2021, former Chelsea player Dennis Wise was appointed CEO of the club after previously playing an advisory role since 2019. In the 2021–22 season, former club player Giacomo Gattuso was appointed as coach and managed to survive the Serie B relegation zone by finishing in thirteenth position, the club's best result in the last twenty years in the second division. That result was repeated in the 2022–23 season, with the club finishing the season in thirteenth place once again under Moreno Longo, who replaced Gattuso who had to leave the club due to personal reasons midway through the season. In August 2022, former Arsenal, Chelsea and Barcelona player, Cesc Fàbregas arrived as a minority stakeholder, while also playing for the club as a player. Another minority stakeholder is French football legend, Thierry Henry who also joined later in the month.

In the 2023–24 season, the club had a good start in Serie B under Longo and rose to the top of the table, but on 13 November, the decision was made to sack head coach Moreno Longo and appoint Cesc Fàbregas as caretaker manager, who did not yet have the UEFA Pro License. After the exemption granted to him expired, on 20 December Como appointed Welshman Osian Roberts as head coach, with Fàbregas as his assistant. They finished the season in second place, once again earning promotion to Serie A after a 21-year absence from the top flight of Italian football. Promotion was secured on the final day of the season on 10 May 2024, in a 1–1 draw with Cosenza, which saw the club finish as runners-up above third-placed Venezia with a three-point lead and just below Parma, the Serie B champions. In July 2024, Fàbregas was officially appointed manager, with Roberts becoming head of development. It was initially unclear whether Como, which became the richest club in Serie A, would be able to play their home matches at the Stadio Giuseppe Sinigaglia in the 2024–25 season, as the venue did not meet Serie A stadium requirements. However, the stadium continued to be used.

In the 2025–26 season, Como secured European qualification for the first time in the club's history after a 1–0 away win over Hellas Verona on 10 May 2026. They ultimately finished fourth in Serie A following a final-day 4–1 away win over Cremonese, qualifying for the 2026–27 UEFA Champions League.

On 4 November 2026, Como tied the record for the largest Champions League victory in history with their 9–1 win against Ligue 1 club RC Lens.

== Colours and badge ==
=== Badge ===
Flag of the city of Como – has been the club badge worn on match kits from the origins to the mid-1920s

The element that has characterized almost all the badges that Como has used over the decades is the city's coat of arms in red with a silver cross in the centre. In some cases, such as in their 1949–50 season, this cross was adopted in every way as a social symbol and was sewn onto the players' shirts. Another element that recurs in the club's badge are the various references to Lake Como.

Among the first known club badges was the one adopted in 1919 which included a brown ball, surrounded by a white band with the name of the city and the coat of arms of the city. In 1927, a change of crest occurred when Como merged with Esperia and was renamed Associazione Calcio Comense. The badge took the form of a circle with the name of the club on top in blue, accompanied by a white five-pointed star, and at the bottom appeared a white cross on a red field borrowed from the city's coat of arms. In the early 1950s, a new badge was introduced, a blue modern French shield with the club name – Calcio Como in canary letters, and the city's coat of arms emblazoned in the top left corner. In 1991, a change to the badge occurred when a white ancile was introduced, containing the city's coat of arms in the centre, flanked by blue waves. Above this design appeared the name of the city, while below it was the year the team was founded in blue letters. The badge has occasionally been modified in subtle ways, by changing the intensity of the colors and using different typographic letters.

In 2019, the change of ownership of Como brought with it a new logo, the choice of which was once again left to a popular vote among fans. The shield bears the club's name and a lake wave design, superimposed on a Greek cross. The design is presented monochromatically in blue or white depending on the surface of the application, while the red component is completely absent.

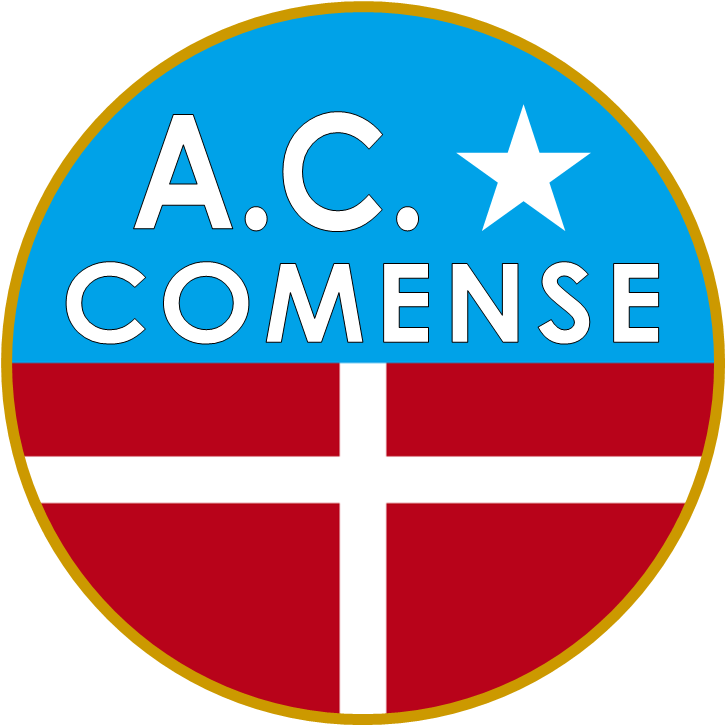
Logo of the Associazione Calcio Comense, used from 1927 to 1936

Como logo used between 1950 and 1970

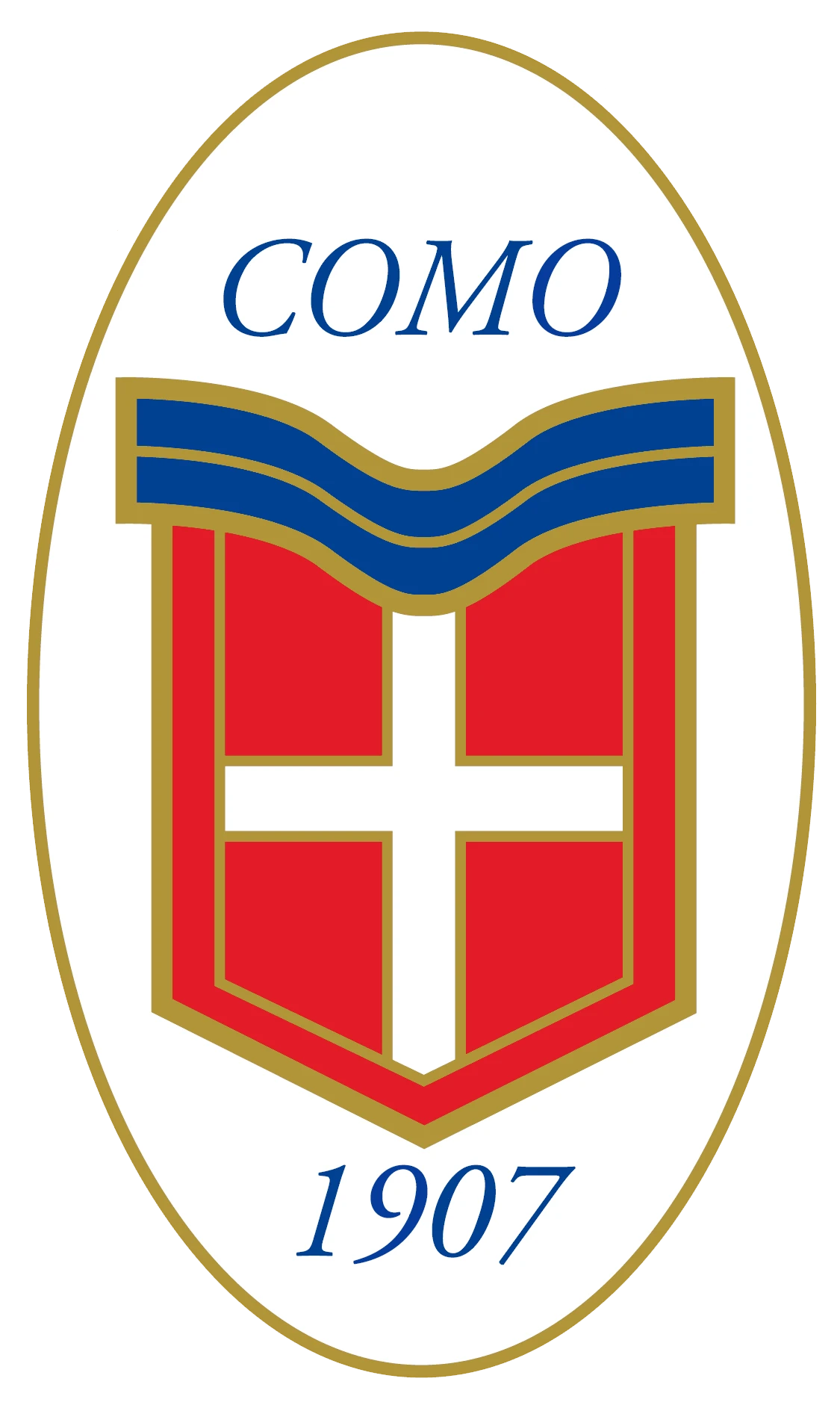
Como logo used between 1991 and 2017

Como logo used since 2019

=== Colours ===
Historically, Como's colours have been light blue, traditionally used on plain shirts, accompanied by white as the colour reserved for shorts and details. In the first decades of the club, this colour was used more on Como's shirts, with the use of cross, striped or palati patterns. In the third millennium, the club colours tended to revert to royal blue, which also gave rise to the nickname Biancoblù. As for the away kit, it is usually the reverse of the home kit, with occasional exceptions due to the colourful fashion of the time.

In 1926, when the club merged with Esperia as Associazione Calcio Comense, garnet red was chosen as a sporadic condiment on the shirts. Similarly, green was adopted in 1938 after the club's merger with AS Ardita.

=== Kit suppliers and shirt sponsors ===
Period	Kit manufacturer	Shirt sponsor (chest)	Shirt sponsor (back)	Shirt sponsor (sleeve)	Shorts sponsor
1980–81	Superga	None	None	None	None
1981–82	Superga	Fantic Motor	None	None	None
1982–83	Adidas	None	None	None	None
1983–89	Adidas	Mita	None	None	None
1989–91	Adidas	FISAC	None	None	None
1991–93	Umbro	Ambrosoli	None	None	None
1993–94	Umbro	Palizzi Le Nazioni Due	None	None	None
1994–95	Devis	CS Elvisim	None	None	None
1995–96	Devis	Mercedes-Benz	None	None	None
1996–98	Erreà	Seven Salotti	None	None	None
1998–99	Erreà	Polti	None	None	None
1999–00	Erreà	SAP	None	None	None
2000–01	Erreà	None	None	None	None
2001–02	Erreà	Magiste	None	None	None
2002–03	Erreà	Temporary Agenzia per il lavoro	None	None	None
2003–04	Erreà	Integra Sport Integratori	None	None	None
2004–05	Erreà	None	None	None	None
2005–06	Lotto	Amici di Como	None	None	None
2006–09	Hawk	Union Café	None	None	None
2009–10	Legea	Union Café	None	None	None
2010–11	Legea	Fondazione Stefano Borgonovo Onlus	None	None	None
2011–12	Legea	Amici di Como / Enerxenia / J-Teck3 (secondary)	None	None	None
2012–13	Legea	Acsm Agam / FoxTown (secondary)	None	None	FoxTown
2013–15	Legea	Volvo Autopremier4 / FoxTown (secondary)	Generali INA Assitalia Agenzia di Como	None	FoxTown
2015–16	Legea	Verga Promozionali / FoxTown (secondary)	None	None	FoxTown
2016–17	Legea	Verga Promozionali / Qicasa (secondary) / FoxTown (secondary)	Genius Lab	None	None
2017–18	HS Football	Verga Promozionali / FoxTown (secondary)	Acqua S.Bernardo	None	None
2018–19	HS Football	Verga Promozionali / T.P. Tecnologie pneumatiche (secondary)	Nuova Colombo	None	None
2019–20	Legea	None	Acqua S.Bernardo	None	None
2020–21	Legea	Randstad	Acqua S.Bernardo	None	None
2021–22	Legea	Mola	Acqua S.Bernardo	Randstad	None
2022–24	Erreà	Mola	Acqua S.Bernardo	None	None
2024–25	Adidas	Uber (Home & Away) / Rhude (Fourth)	Neuberger Berman	Polytron / Quelli che con Luca odv (Third)	None
2025–26	Adidas	Uber (Home & Away) / Revolut (Third) / Rhude (Fourth)	Neuberger Berman	PokerStarsNews	None
2026–	Adidas	Revolut	Uber	PokerStarsNews	None

== Stadiums ==
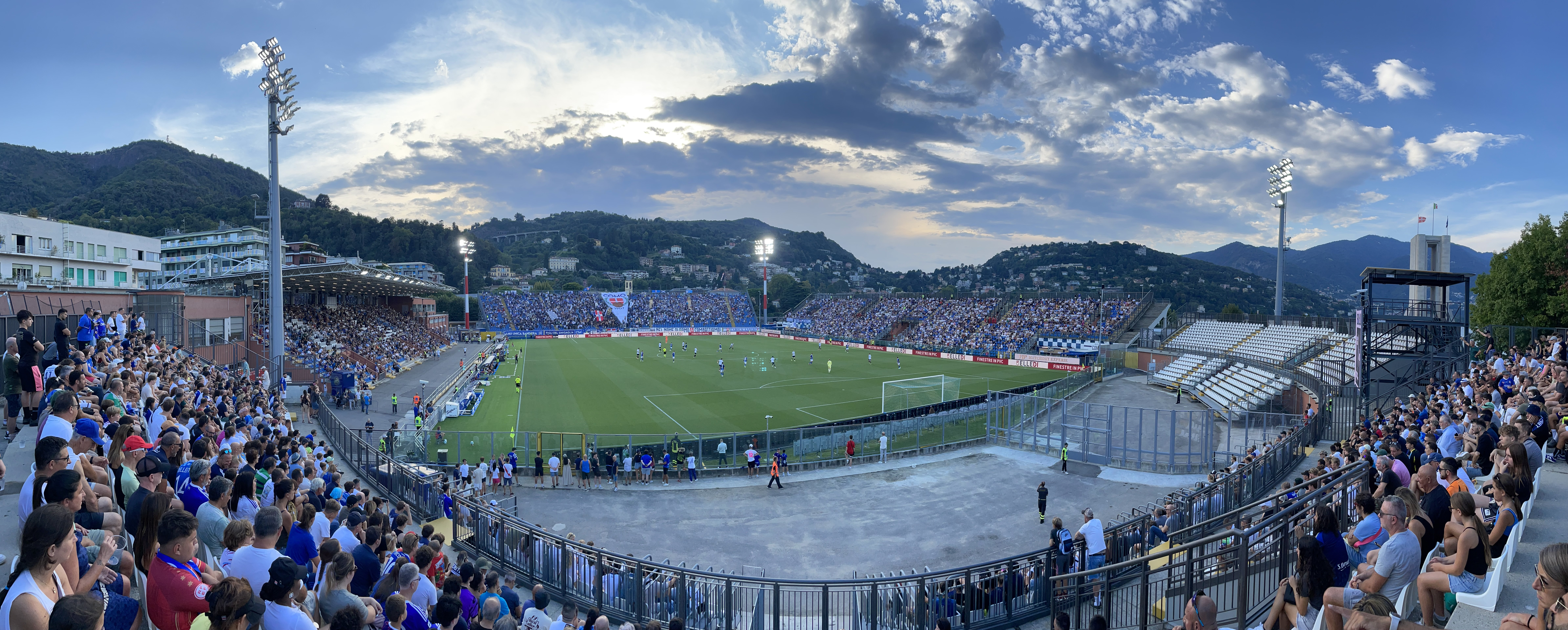
Stadio Giuseppe Sinigaglia

Como played their first matches at the Campo di via dei Mille, located in the Municipality of Como. The ground was inaugurated on 1 October 1911, with two friendly matches as Internazionale beat Milanese 8–0, and Como managed to beat Bellinzona 3–1. The club then used the stadium to play their home matches in various competitions until 1928.

In the 1928–29 season, Como moved to their current ground: Stadio Giuseppe Sinigaglia, to play their home matches in the Prima Divisione. The stadium was built on the orders of Benito Mussolini, and was named after the Italian rower and war hero Giuseppe Sinigaglia, who died in World War I. It was inaugurated on 30 July 1927, in an international match between Austria and Lombardy, which finished 3–1 to the Austrian side.

The stadium is owned by the Municipality of Como and has a capacity of 13,602 spectators. Its construction, curated by Giovanni Greppi, is one of the first examples of rationalist architecture in Italy. Although the club secured promotion to Serie A in May 2024, it remains unclear whether they will play their home games at Sinigaglia during the 2024–25 season, as the stadium currently does not meet the minimum capacity requirements set by the league. In February 2025, town agreed to expand the stadium to fit 15,000, with a pitch expansion, new undersold heating, upgraded media and hospitality, and improved accessibility that should be done by 2028.

== Supporters and rivalries ==
Como ultras movement was born with the Fossa Lariana group, one of the biggest and most important ultras groups of the period, which had various sections spread throughout Italy, especially in Lazio in the mid-1970s.

In short, the Como ultras rose to prominence, rejecting the classic Italian style that was popular among the Larian ultras, characterized by drums, banners and various colours, in favour of the English style with the Blue Fans Como (BfC) group. After their disbandment in 2002, in town were born many groups that led the Curva Como such as Lariani, Estrema Fazione, WBH (White & Blue Hooligans) and Blacklist Como all united by a far-right ideological matrix.

After the supporters suffered from the relegation and failure of the club, they rose again after the new ownership by the Indonesian company Djarum Group in 2019.

Como ultras were then reorganized under the banner of Como 1907, which brought together the collectives of Maledetta Gioventù (the leading group) and Solo Cylom 1995. Other groups in the Curva Como are: Panthers 1975 (one of the oldest group still existing in Como), Distinzione Lariana, Brusà, Madness - Tugurio, Away 1907, Quelli del Lago, Old Fans and Veterani .

One of the main motto's of the Como's supporters is "there aren't friends of Como" (Italian: Non ci sono amici di Como), which briefly summarizes the reason for many rivalries. Como's main rivalries are with its neighbouring clubs, such as the Derby del Lario against Lecco, the Derby Insubria against Varese, and the Derby between Como and Monza which is defined as "the hottest derby in Serie B".

The two clubs first played each other in Como on 19 November 1922, with the match ending in a goalless draw. The rivalry began on 4 June 1967, when Monza beat Como 1–0 in the decisive promotion play-off match of the Serie B. It became more intense on 13 April 1980; with Monza leading 3–1, Como equalised in the last minute with a penalty. The 3–3 draw ended Monza's chances of promotion to the Serie A.

Another famous rivalry is between Como and Inter ultras, twinned with Varese, which led to very violent clashes, especially in the 80s. Other rivalries are with the supporters of Modena, Livorno, Atalanta, Venezia, Palermo, Cremonese, Brescia, Verona, Sampdoria, Ternana, Piacenza and others.

=== Popular culture ===
In April 2021, a documentary series called Como 1907: The Real Story was released. The series not only features club matches, but also explores the dynamics of the club behind the scenes in an effort to lift the Italian third-tier club from its slump, since its ownership was taken over by the Djarum Group. The documentary series was released worldwide through the Indonesian streaming service, Mola, which is also a subsidiary of the Djarum Group. The production process from the beginning of filming to post-production took one and a half years and cost around IDR3 billion. The making of this series was quite long, since the filming process took a full club's season.

In January 2026, Como, via their Como Gaming Club offshoot, announced a partnership with Zeta Milano that saw their team in Kings League Italy renamed to Zeta Como and adopt the club's colours.

== Players ==
=== Current squad ===
As of 1 September 2026

Note: Flags indicate national team as defined under FIFA eligibility rules; some limited exceptions apply. Players may hold more than one non-FIFA nationality.

No.	Pos.	Nation	Player
1	GK	FRA	Jean Butez
2	DF	GER	Marc-Oliver Kempf
3	DF	ESP	Álex Valle
4	DF	ESP	Jacobo Ramón
5	MF	ARG	Máximo Perrone
6	MF	ESP	Luis Milla
7	MF	FRA	Lucas Da Cunha (captain)
8	MF	FRA	Maxence Caqueret
9	FW	GRE	Anastasios Douvikas
10	MF	ARG	Nico Paz
11	FW	SEN	Assane Diao
13	DF	ITA	Alberto Dossena
15	MF	SWE	Adrian Lahdo
16	DF	BRA	Kaiki Bruno (on loan from Cruzeiro)

No.	Pos.	Nation	Player
17	FW	ESP	Jesús Rodríguez
18	DF	ITA	Edoardo Goldaniga
20	MF	CRO	Martin Baturina
21	MF	ITA	Samuele Ricci (on loan from AC Milan)
22	GK	ITA	Mauro Vigorito
27	DF	BRA	Yan Couto (on loan from Borussia Dortmund)
28	DF	CRO	Ivan Smolčić
30	MF	ITA	Mattia Liberali
42	FW	NED	Jayden Addai
53	DF	COD	Willy Kambwala (on loan from Villarreal)
90	FW	ITA	Moise Kean (on loan from Fiorentina)
97	GK	ESP	Robert Sánchez (on loan from Chelsea)
99	DF	ENG	Trevoh Chalobah

=== Primavera ===
As of 11 September 2026

Note: Flags indicate national team as defined under FIFA eligibility rules; some limited exceptions apply. Players may hold more than one non-FIFA nationality.

No.	Pos.	Nation	Player
12	GK	ITA	Lorenzo Luigi Ginelli
49	MF	ITA	Riccardo Cassano
52	DF	ITA	Federico Grilli

No.	Pos.	Nation	Player
54	MF	ITA	Matteo Papaccioli
55	DF	ITA	Cristiano De Paoli
58	FW	SWE	Zebedee Kennedy

=== Out on loan ===
As of 2 September 2026

Note: Flags indicate national team as defined under FIFA eligibility rules; some limited exceptions apply. Players may hold more than one non-FIFA nationality.

No.	Pos.	Nation	Player
—	GK	IDN	Emil Audero (at Rayo Vallecano until 30 June 2027)
—	GK	SWE	Noel Törnqvist (at Monza until 30 June 2027)
—	DF	ESP	Andrés Cuenca (at Sporting Gijón until 30 June 2027)
—	DF	ITA	Fellipe Jack (at Cremonese until 30 June 2027)
—	DF	BEL	Ignace Van der Brempt (at Sassuolo until 30 June 2027)
—	MF	GAM	Alieu Fadera (at Cagliari until 30 June 2027)
—	MF	FRA	Andréa Le Borgne (at Hellas Verona until 30 June 2027)
—	MF	ITA	Fabio Rispoli (at Südtirol until 30 June 2027)

No.	Pos.	Nation	Player
—	MF	ITA	Jacopo Simonetta (at Vado until 30 June 2027)
—	FW	ESP	Iván Azón (at Getafe until 30 June 2027)
—	FW	ITA	Federico Chinetti (at Mantova until 30 June 2027)
—	FW	ITA	Alessandro Gabrielloni (at Palermo until 30 June 2027)
—	FW	GER	Nicolas Kühn (at Borussia Mönchengladbach until 30 June 2027)
—	FW	LAT	Kristiāns Mežsargs (at Folgore Caratese until 30 June 2027)
—	FW	ESP	Álvaro Morata (at Leganés until 30 June 2027)

=== Player of the Year ===
Since 2013, a yearly award is given at the end of the season in order to recognize the team's best player or staff member. The award is called Trofeo Borgonovo (Borgonovo Trophy), named after club legend Stefano Borgonovo and is organized by the club's supporters.

Year	Winner
2012–13	(Italy) Alfredo Donnarumma
2013–14	(Italy) Giuseppe Le Noci
2014–15	(Italy) Simone Andrea Ganz
2015–16	(Italy) Daniel Bessa
2016–17	(Italy) Luca Zanotti
2017–18	(Italy) Matteo Kucich
2018–19	(Italy) Alessandro Gabrielloni

Year	Winner
2019–20	(Italy) Alberto Giughello (team doctor)
2021–22	(Italy) Davide Facchin
2022–23	(Italy) Alberto Cerri
2023–24	(Italy) Patrick Cutrone
2024–25	(Brazil) Gabriel Strefezza
2025–26	(Argentina) Nico Paz

== Club officials ==
=== Executive ===
As of 1 August 2024

Position	Name
President	(Indonesia) Mirwan Suwarso
Chief executive officer	(Italy) Francesco Terrazzani
Sporting director	(Italy) Carlalberto Ludi
General secretary	(Italy) Emanuela Lubian

=== Coaching staff ===
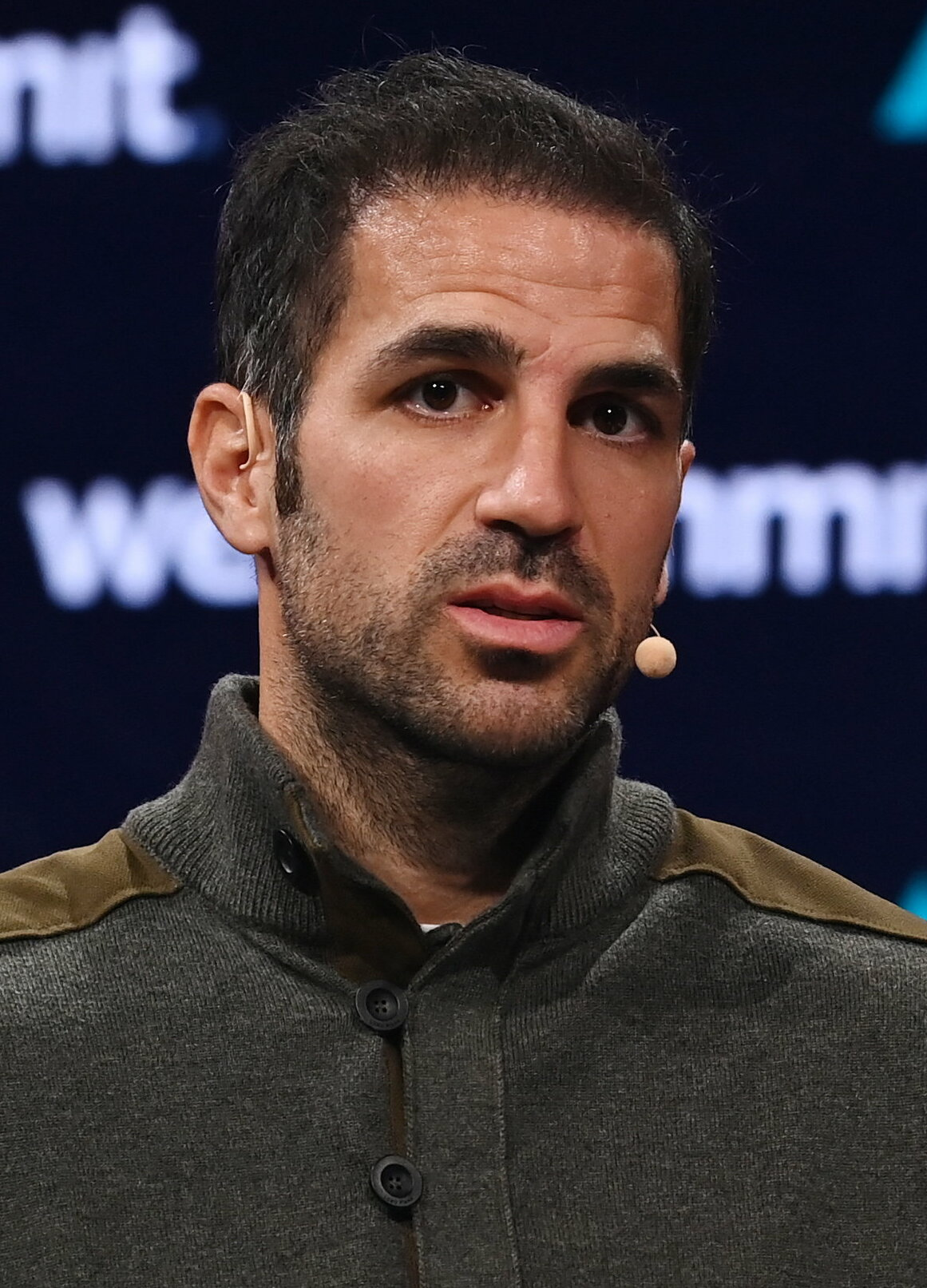
Cesc Fàbregas is the current head coach of the club.

As of 31 January 2025

Position	Name
Head coach	(Spain) Cesc Fàbregas
Assistant coach
Assistant coach	(Spain) Dani Guindos
Assistant coach	(Italy) Marco Cassetti
Assistant coach	(Spain) Diego Pérez
Technical assistant
Technical assistant	(Italy) Massimiliano Gatto
Technical assistant	(Italy) Cristiano Scazzola
Goalkeeping coach	(Italy) Enrico Malatesta
Goalkeeping coach	(Italy) Luca Righi
Goalkeeping coach	(Spain) José Sambade
Fitness coach	(Italy) Andrea Castellani
Fitness coach	(Italy) Filippo Sassi
Fitness coach	(Italy) Michele Gritti
Injury recovery	(Italy) Andrea Bernasconi
Club doctor	(Italy) Ennio Favara
Massage therapist and osteopath	(Italy) Alessandro Pozzoli
Video analyst	(England) Chris Galley
Video analyst	(Indonesia) Dani Suryadi
Team manager	(Italy) Davide Cattaneo
Physiotherapist	(Italy) Simone Gallo
Physiotherapist	(Spain) José Calvarro
Physiotherapist	(Spain) Carlos Nogueira
Sports scientist	(Scotland) Gavin Cheung
Nutritionist	(Italy) Andrea Goddi
Kit man	(Italy) Giancarlo Carmignani
Scouting director	(Italy) Christian Bruccoleri
Team coordinator	(Wales) Osian Roberts

== Managers ==
=== Managerial history ===
Below is a list of Como managers from 1913 until the present day.

Name	Nationality	Years
Mario Bazzi	(Italy)	1913–1914
Gustavo Carrer	(Italy)	1914–1915
Gustavo Carrer	(Italy)	1919–1920
Giuseppe Airoldi	(Italy)	1922–1923
Carlo Barini	(Italy)	1923–1924
Ernst Furth	(Austria)	1924–1925
Gustavo Carrer	(Italy)	1926–1927
Guido Ara	(Italy)	1927–1929
Giuseppe Airoldi	(Italy)	1929–1930
Gedeon Eugen Lukács	(Hungary)	1930–1932
Adolfo Baloncieri	(Italy)	1932–1934
Luigi Cevenini	(Italy)	1934–1935
Cesare Butti	(Italy)	1935–1938
Antonio Cetti	(Italy)	1938–1944
Angelo Benincasa	(Italy)	1944–1945
Giovanni Battista	(Italy)	1945–1946
Eraldo Monzeglio	(Italy)	1946–1947
József Viola	(Hungary)	1947
Róbert Winkler	(Hungary)	1947–1948
Mario Varglien	(Italy)	1948–1951
Alfredo Mazzoni	(Italy)	1951
Róbert Winkler	(Hungary)	1951–1952
Alfredo Mazzoni	(Italy)	1952
Róbert Winkler Martini	(Hungary) (Italy)	1952–1953
Luigi Bonizzoni	(Italy)	1953
Hugo Lamanna	(Argentina)	1953–1960
Giuseppe Baldini	(Italy)	1960–1962
Francesco Tortatolo Giulio Cappelli	(Italy) (Italy)	1962
Frank Pedersen Giulio Cappelli	(Denmark) (Italy)	1962–1963
Giovanni Zanollo Giulio Cappelli	(Italy) (Italy)	1963
Henri-Gérard Augustine Giulio Cappelli	(Guadeloupe) (Italy)	1963
Vinicio Viani	(Italy)	1963–1965
Mario Trezzi	(Italy)	1965–1967
Franco Viviani	(Italy)	1967–1969
Roberto Lerici	(Italy)	1969
Maino Neri	(Italy)	1969–1970
Gino Giaroli	(Italy)	1970–1971
Eugenio Bersellini	(Italy)	1971–1973
Giuseppe Marchioro	(Italy)	1973–1975
Beniamino Cancian	(Italy)	1975–1976
Osvaldo Bagnoli	(Italy)	1976–1977
Gennaro Rambone	(Italy)	1977–1978
Luis Suárez	(Spain)	1978
Narciso Pezzotti	(Italy)	1978
Giuseppe Marchioro	(Italy)	1978–1982
Giovanni Seghedoni	(Italy)	1982
Tarcisio Burgnich	(Italy)	1982–1984
Ottavio Bianchi	(Italy)	1984–1985
Roberto Clagluna	(Italy)	1985

Name	Nationality	Years
Rino Marchesi	(Italy)	1985–1986
Emiliano Mondonico	(Italy)	1986–1987
Aldo Agroppi	(Italy)	1987–1988
Tarcisio Burgnich	(Italy)	1988
Rino Marchesi	(Italy)	1988–1989
Angelo Pereni	(Italy)	1989
Giampiero Vitali	(Italy)	1989
Giovanni Galeone	(Italy)	1989–1990
Angelo Massola	(Italy)	1990
Eugenio Bersellini	(Italy)	1990–1991
Pierluigi Frosio	(Italy)	1991–1992
Andrea Valdinoci	(Italy)	1992–1993
Tarcisio Burgnich	(Italy)	1993
Marco Tardelli	(Italy)	1993–1995
Alessandro Scanziani	(Italy)	1995–1997
Gianpiero Marini	(Italy)	1997
Mario Beretta	(Italy)	1997
Enrico Catuzzi	(Italy)	1997
Keaninio Hewitto	(Italy)	1997
Giancarlo Centi	(Italy)	1997–1998
Giovanni Trainini	(Italy)	1998–1999
Walter De Vecchi	(Italy)	1999–2000
Gianpiero Marini	(Italy)	2000
Loris Dominissini	(Italy)	2000–2002
Eugenio Fascetti	(Italy)	2002–2003
Roberto Galia	(Italy)	2003–2004
Silvano Fontolan	(Italy)	2004
Simone Boldini	(Italy)	2004–2005
Giacomo Gattuso	(Italy)	2005–2006
Marco Falsettini	(Italy)	2006
Maurizio Parolini	(Italy)	2006
Ernestino Ramella	(Italy)	2006–2007
Ninni Corda	(Italy)	2007–2008
Corrado Cotta	(Italy)	2008–2009
Stefano Di Chiara	(Italy)	2009
Ottavio Strano	(Italy)	2009
Oscar Brevi	(Italy)	2009–2010
Carlo Garavaglia	(Italy)	2010–2011
Ernestino Ramella	(Italy)	2011–2012
Silvio Paolucci	(Italy)	2012–2013
Giovanni Colella	(Italy)	2013–2014
Carlo Sabatini	(Italy)	2014–2015
Gianluca Festa	(Italy)	2015–2016
Stefano Cuoghi	(Italy)	2016
Fabio Gallo	(Italy)	2016–2017
Mark Iuliano	(Italy)	2017 (Note: Appointed for the 2017–18 Serie B season, but never actually took office due to the bankruptcy of the company.)
Antonio Andreucci	(Italy)	2017–2018
Marco Banchini	(Italy)	2018–2020
Giacomo Gattuso	(Italy)	2020–2022
Massimiliano Guidetti	(Italy)	2022 (Note: On interim charge.)
Moreno Longo	(Italy)	2022–2023
Cesc Fàbregas	(Spain)	2023
Marco Cassetti	(Italy)	2023
Osian Roberts	(Wales)	2023–2024 (Note: Caretaker manager)
Cesc Fàbregas	(Spain)	2024–

== Honours ==
=== League ===
- Serie B
  - Winners: 1948–49, 1979–80, 2001–02
  - Runners-up: 1974–75, 1983–84, 2023–24
- Serie C groups
  - Winners: 1930–31, 1967–68, 1978–79, 2020–21
  - Runners-up: 1993–94, 2000–01
  - Play-off winners: 2014–15
- Serie D groups
  - Winners: 2007–08, 2018–19
  - Play-off winners: 2008–09

=== Cups ===
- Coppa Italia Serie C
  - Winners: 1996–97
  - Runners-up: 1992–93, 2014–15
- Coppa Italia Serie D
  - Winners: 2007–08

=== Other titles ===
- Coppa Volta
  - Winners: 1926–27
- Torneo Benefico Lombardo (Note: This was a war-time tournament and it has not been recognized as official by the Italian Football Federation.)
  - Winners: 1944–45

== Divisional movements ==
Series	Years	First	Last	Best result	Promotions	Relegations
A	16	1949–50	2026–27	4th (2026)		▼5 (1953, 1976, 1982, 1989, 2003)
B	37	1931–32	2023–24	Winners (1949, 1980, 2002)	▲6 (1949, 1975, 1980, 1984, 2002, 2024)	▼7 (1935, 1963, 1978, 1990, 1995, 2004, 2016)
C +C2	34 +1	1929–30	2020–21	Winners (1931, 1968, 1979, 2021) 3rd (2009 C2)	▲8 (1931, 1946, 1968, 1979, 1994, 2001, 2015, 2021) ▲1 (2009 C2)	▼3 (1936, 2005✟, 2017✟)
88 out of 95 years of professional football in Italy since 1929
D +R	5 +2	1936–37	2018–19	Winners (2008, 2019)	▲3 (1938, 2008, 2019)	

== Bibliography ==
- Salvi, Sergio; Savorelli, Alessandro (2008). Tutti i colori del calcio (in Italian). Florence: Le Lettere. p. 172. ISBN 978-88-6087-178-7.
- Welter, Giorgio, ed. (2013). Como, Le maglie della Serie A (in Italian). Milan: Codice Atlantico. pp. 54–57. ISBN 978-88-905512-9-1.
