= Trnava (disambiguation) =

Trnava is a city in Slovakia.

Trnava may also refer to:

== Croatia ==
- Trnava, Osijek-Baranja County, a village and municipality
- Trnava, Brod-Posavina County, a village near Gornji Bogićevci
- Trnava (Međimurje), a river in Međimurje County
- Trnava, Zagreb, a part of Donja Dubrava, Zagreb

== Czech Republic ==
- Trnava (Želivka), a river
- Trnava (Třebíč District), a municipality and village in the Vysočina Region
- Trnava (Zlín District), a municipality and village in the Zlín Region
- Trnava, a village and part of Boharyně in the Hradec Králové Region

== Serbia ==
- Trnava (Čačak), a village near Čačak
- Trnava (Čajetina), a village near Čajetina
- Trnava (Jagodina), a village near Jagodina
- Trnava (Novi Pazar), a village near Novi Pazar
- Trnava (Preševo), a village near Preševo
- Trnava (Raška), a village near Raška
- Trnava (Užice), a village in the vicinity of Užice
- Donja Trnava (disambiguation), several villages
- Gornja Trnava (disambiguation), several villages
- Rajčinovićka Trnava, a village near Novi Pazar

== Slovakia ==
- Trnava pri Laborci, a municipality and village in the Košice Region
- Trnava Region

== Slovenia ==
- Trnava, Braslovče, a settlement in the Municipality of Braslovče

== See also ==
- Târnava (disambiguation)
- Tarnava (disambiguation)
- Tîrnova (disambiguation)
- Târnova (disambiguation)
- Veliko Tarnovo or simply Tarnovo, a city in Bulgaria
- Tyrnävä, a town in Finland
- Trava (disambiguation)
- Trnova (disambiguation)
- Trnavac (disambiguation)
