= North Macedonia national under-17 football team =

North Macedonia Under-17
- Nickname: The Red Lions (Црвени лавови)
- Association: Football Federation of Macedonia
- Confederation: UEFA (Europe)
- Head coach: (North Macedonia) Dragi Kanatlarovski
- FIFA code: MKD
First colours	Second colours

World Cup
- Appearances: 0

European championships
- Appearances: 0

North Macedonia's national under-17 football team is the national under-17 football team of the Republic of North Macedonia and is controlled by the Football Federation of North Macedonia. The current manager is Dragi Kanatlarovski. For only players born 1 January 2004 or later are permitted to partake.

== Competitive record ==
*Denotes draws include knockout matches decided on penalty kicks.
Red border color indicates tournament was held on home soil.

=== FIFA U-17 World Cup ===
Year	Round	GP	W	D*	L	GS	GA
(China) 1985	Part of Yugoslavia						
(Canada) 1987	Part of Yugoslavia						
(Scotland) 1989	Part of Yugoslavia						
(Italy) 1991	Part of Yugoslavia						
(Japan) 1993	Part of Yugoslavia						
(Ecuador) 1995	did not qualify						
(Egypt) 1997	did not qualify						
(New Zealand) 1999	did not qualify						
(Trinidad and Tobago) 2001	did not qualify						
(Finland) 2003	did not qualify						
(Peru) 2005	did not qualify						
(South Korea) 2007	did not qualify						
(Nigeria) 2009	did not qualify						
(Mexico) 2011	did not qualify						
(United Arab Emirates) 2013	did not qualify						
(Chile) 2015	did not qualify						
(India) 2017	did not qualify						
(Brazil) 2019	did not qualify						
(Peru) ~~2021~~	Cancelled						
(Indonesia) 2023	did not qualify						
(Qatar) 2025	did not qualify						
(Qatar) 2026	did not qualify						
(Qatar) 2027	To be determined						
(Qatar) 2028	To be determined						
(Qatar) 2029	To be determined						
Total	0/20	0	0	0	0	0	0

=== UEFA European U-17 Championship ===
Year	Round	GP	W	D*	L	GS	GA
(Denmark) 2002	did not qualify						
(Portugal) 2003	did not qualify						
(France) 2004	did not qualify						
(Italy) 2005	did not qualify						
(Luxembourg) 2006	did not qualify						
(Belgium) 2007	did not qualify						
(Turkey) 2008	did not qualify						
(Germany) 2009	did not qualify						
(Liechtenstein) 2010	did not qualify						
(Serbia) 2011	did not qualify						
(Slovenia) 2012	did not qualify						
(Slovakia) 2013	did not qualify						
(Malta) 2014	did not qualify						
(Bulgaria) 2015	did not qualify						
(Azerbaijan) 2016	did not qualify						
(Croatia) 2017	did not qualify						
(England) 2018	did not qualify						
(Republic of Ireland) 2019	did not qualify						
(Estonia) ~~2020~~	Cancelled due to COVID-19 pandemic						
(Cyprus) ~~2021~~	Cancelled due to COVID-19 pandemic						
(Israel) 2022	did not qualify						
(Hungary) 2023	did not qualify						
(Cyprus) 2024	did not qualify						
(Albania) 2025	did not qualify						
(Estonia) 2026	did not qualify						
(Latvia) 2027	To be determined						
(Lithuania) 2028	To be determined						
(Moldova) 2029	To be determined						
Total	0/21	0	0	0	0	0	0

== 2026 UEFA European Under-17 Championship qualification ==
=== Group 2 ===
Pos	Team	Pld	W	D	L	GF	GA	GD	Pts	Qualification
1	Czech Republic	3	3	0	0	22	1	+21	9	Round 2 League A
2	North Macedonia (H)	3	1	1	1	11	4	+7	4	Round 2 League A
3	Hungary	3	1	1	1	11	9	+2	4	Round 2 League B
4	Gibraltar	3	0	0	3	0	30	−30	0	Round 2 League B

Source: UEFA
Rules for classification: Tiebreakers
(H) Hosts
8 October 2025
13:00

Czech Republic	13–0	Gibraltar
Zahálka 1', 14', 40'; Azaka 11', 22', 45+2'; Švec 16', 20'; Drakes 31' (o.g.); Srb 45+3'; Cáhlik 55' (pen.); Ilinčič 71'; Key 88' (o.g.)	Report

Stadion Kukuš, Turnovo
Attendance: 35
Referee: Karl Koppel (Estonia)
8 October 2025
13:00

North Macedonia	2–2	Hungary
Stojkovski 44'; Dzangarovski 67'	Report	Polonkai 23'; Bősze 48'

Stadion Mladost, Strumica
Attendance: 200
Referee: Artem Gasparyan (Armenia)

11 October 2025
13:00

Czech Republic	2–0	North Macedonia
Marek 31'; Sivok 87'	Report

Stadion Mladost, Strumica
Attendance: 220
Referee: Dmytro Kubriak (Ukraine)
11 October 2025
13:00

Hungary	8–0	Gibraltar
Juhász 23'; Somogyi 30', 45+4', 69'; Somfalvi 48'; Bősze 66'; Polonkai 89'; Dajka 90+5'	Report

Stadion Kukuš, Turnovo
Attendance: 35
Referee: Karl Koppel (Estonia)

14 October 2025
13:00

Hungary	1–7	Czech Republic
Bősze 89' (pen.)	Report	Zahálka 10'; Švec 28'; Srb 40', 84'; Polonkai 58' (o.g.); Cvejn 68'; Chumlen 73'

Stadion Mladost, Strumica
Attendance: 30
Referee: Artem Gasparyan (Armenia)
14 October 2025
13:00

Gibraltar	0–9	North Macedonia
	Report	Papaliski 23', 44', 68'; Ljacka 34'; Mihajlovski 41'; Cvetkovski 53'; Dzangarovski 56', 61' (pen.); Mamuti 89'

Stadion Kukuš, Turnovo
Attendance: 60
Referee: Dmytro Kubriak (Ukraine)

=== Group A1 ===
Pos	Team	Pld	W	D	L	GF	GA	GD	Pts	Promotion
1	France	3	3	0	0	6	1	+5	9	Qualified for the final tournament and 2026 FIFA U-17 World Cup
2	Slovenia (H)	3	1	1	1	5	3	+2	4	
3	Germany	3	1	1	1	3	4	−1	4	
4	North Macedonia	3	0	0	3	2	8	−6	0	Relegation to League B Round 1 of the 2027/2028 season for respective U-19 team

Source: UEFA
Rules for classification: Qualification tiebreakers
(H) Hosts
25 March 2026
16:00

Germany	2–1	North Macedonia
Mirza 3'; Veit 25'	Report	Dzangarovski 63'

Športni park Brinje, Grosuplje
Referee: David Rafael Oliveira Da Silva (Portugal)

28 March 2026
16:00

France	2–1	North Macedonia
Loufoundou 23'; Amaaouch 63'	Report	Dzangarovski 22' (pen.)

Športni park Brinje, Grosuplje
Referee: David Rafael Oliveira Da Silva (Portugal)

31 March 2026
16:30

North Macedonia	0–4	Slovenia
	Report	Jereb 11', 82'; Balažic 43'; Robin 90+2'

NNC Brdo, Kranj
Referee: Jan Všetečka (Czechia)

== 2027 UEFA European Under-17 Championship qualification ==
=== Group 11 ===
Pos	Team	Pld	W	D	L	GF	GA	GD	Pts	Qualification
1	Turkey (H)	0	0	0	0	0	0	0	0	Round 2 League A
2	North Macedonia	0	0	0	0	0	0	0	0	Round 2 League A
3	Hungary	0	0	0	0	0	0	0	0	Round 2 League B
4	San Marino	0	0	0	0	0	0	0	0	Round 2 League B

First match(es) will be played: Autumn 2026. Source: UEFA
Rules for classification: Tiebreakers

== Current squad ==
The following players were called up for the most recent 2026 UEFA European Under-17 Championship qualification matches.

No.	Pos.	Player	Date of birth (age)	Club
	GK	Darijan Denkovski	6 February 2009 (age 17)	(Football Federation of Macedonia) Sloga 1934
	GK	Rinor Ceka	14 April 2009 (age 17)	(Football Federation of Macedonia) Shkëndija
1	GK	Amin Suljovikj	3 March 2009 (age 17)	(Football Federation of Macedonia) Skopje
12	GK	Luka Grchevski	28 February 2009 (age 17)	(Football Association of Serbia) Crvena zvezda
2	DF	Pavel Ribarski	23 March 2009 (age 17)	(Football Federation of Macedonia) Vardar
14	DF	Pavel Mironski	7 March 2009 (age 17)	(Football Federation of Macedonia) Makedonija G.P.
5	DF	Marko Ivanov	14 August 2009 (age 17)	(Football Association of Slovenia) Koper
16	DF	Alek Chedomirski	27 April 2009 (age 17)	(Football Federation of Macedonia) Makedonija G.P.
17	DF	Gregorijan Mihajlovski (captain)	23 January 2009 (age 17)	(Swiss Football Association) Servette
3	DF	Filip Cvetkovski	4 August 2009 (age 17)	(Football Federation of Macedonia) Vardar
4	DF	Aleksa Jazadjikj	15 February 2009 (age 17)	(Football Federation of Macedonia) Makedonija G.P.
20	DF	Meldin Alomerovic	17 February 2009 (age 17)	(Football Association of Slovenia) Slovan
6	MF	Arda Iljazovski	7 November 2009 (age 17)	(Danish Football Association) B.93
8	MF	Blendi Ljachka	12 February 2009 (age 17)	(Turkish Football Federation) Fenerbahçe
13	MF	Luka Jasmin Gjorgjijev	2 July 2009 (age 17)	(Football Federation of Macedonia) Makedonija G.P.
19	MF	Aleksandar Petrovski	7 June 2009 (age 17)	(Football Association of Serbia) Crvena zvezda
7	MF	Luka Trpevski	22 January 2010 (age 16)	(Football Association of Serbia) Crvena zvezda
15	MF	Marko Mircheski	24 June 2009 (age 17)	(Football Federation of Macedonia) Ohrid
11	FW	Martin Djangarovski	11 June 2009 (age 17)	(Football Federation of Macedonia) Makedonija G.P.
18	FW	Vasko Papaliski	8 March 2009 (age 17)	(Football Federation of Macedonia) Skopje
	FW	Fadilj Islamovikj	7 January 2009 (age 17)	(Croatian Football Federation) NK Kustošija
10	FW	Andrej Cvetkovski	20 April 2009 (age 17)	(Football Federation of Macedonia) Rabotnički
9	FW	Jakov Stojkovski	23 May 2009 (age 17)	(German Football Association) Paderborn

== See also ==
- European Under-17 Football Championship
- North Macedonia national football team
- North Macedonia national under-21 football team
- North Macedonia national under-19 football team
