= Trnovo =

Trnovo may refer to the following places:

== Bosnia and Herzegovina ==
- Trnovo, Republika Srpska, a town and municipality
- Trnovo, Federation of Bosnia and Herzegovina, the rural part of the same pre-war municipality, presently in the Sarajevo Canton
- Trnovo, Šekovići, a village in Republika Srpska

== Bulgaria ==
- Veliko Tarnovo, or Tarnovo, a city
- Malko Tarnovo, a town

== Croatia ==
- Trnovo, Croatia, a village near Generalski Stol

== Greece ==
- Prasino, a village known before 1955 as Trnovo
- Tyrnavos, a town known as Trnovo during the Middle Ages

== Montenegro ==
- Trnovo, Bar in Bar Municipality

== North Macedonia ==
- Trnovo, Bitola, a village in Bitola municipality
- Trnovo, Gostivar, a village in Gostivar municipality
- Trnovo, Kriva Palanka, a village in Kriva Palanka Municipality

== Slovakia ==
- Trnovo, Martin, a village in Martin District

== Slovenia ==
- Trnovo, Ljubljana, a district of Ljubljana
- Trnovo, Nova Gorica, a village in the Municipality of Nova Gorica

== See also ==
- Tarnovo
- Trnova (disambiguation)
- Turnovo (disambiguation)
