= 2025–26 Como 1907 season =

Association football team season page

Como 1907
2025–26 season
- Owner: Djarum Group
- President: Mirwan Suwarso
- Head coach: Cesc Fàbregas
- Stadium: Stadio Giuseppe Sinigaglia
- Serie A: 4th
- Coppa Italia: Semi-finals
- Top goalscorer: League: Anastasios Douvikas (14); All: Anastasios Douvikas (17)
- Average home league attendance: 11,451
- Biggest win: 6–0 vs Torino (H); 24 January 2026, Serie A
- Biggest defeat: 0–4 vs Internazionale (A); 6 December 2025, Serie A
| Home colours | Away colours | Third colours |

The 2025–26 season was Como 1907's 119th season in existence, and second consecutive season in Serie A. In addition to the domestic league, Como participated in this season's edition of the Coppa Italia. The season covered the period from 1 July 2025 to 30 June 2026.

On 24 January 2026, Como secured its biggest ever Serie A win by defeating Torino 6–0, also equalling the club's biggest ever victory overall (a 7–1 win over Cremonese in the 1966–67 Serie C).

On 10 February 2026, Como secured a semi-final spot in the 2025–26 Coppa Italia, equaling its best-ever performance, having previous made the semi-finals in 1986.

On 10 May 2026, Como qualified mathematically to its first major UEFA competition, and a first international official tournament appearance since the 1980–81 Mitropa Cup. On 24 May, Como secured qualification for the 2026–27 UEFA Champions League. By finishing in fourth, Como also improved upon its best ever Serie A placement (a sixth place finish in 1950).

== Players ==
=== First-team squad ===
As of 2 February 2026

Note: Flags indicate national team as has been defined under FIFA eligibility rules. some limited exceptions apply. Players may hold more than one non-FIFA nationality.

| No. | Player | Nat. | Position | Date of birth (age) | EU | Signed in | Signed from | Contract ends | Transfer fee |
Goalkeepers
| 1 | Jean Butez | (France) | GK | 8 June 1995 (aged 31) | EU | 2025 | (Belgium) Antwerp | 2028 | €2.1m |
| 12 | Henrique Menke | (Brazil) | GK | 12 January 2007 (aged 19) | Non-EU | 2025 | (Brazil) Internacional | 2026 | Loan |
| 21 | Noel Törnqvist | (Sweden) | GK | 1 February 2002 (aged 24) | EU | 2025 | (Sweden) Mjällby AIF | — | €2m |
| 22 | Mauro Vigorito | (Italy) | GK | 22 May 1990 (aged 36) | EU | 2022 | (Italy) Cosenza | — | Free |
| 44 | Nikola Čavlina | (Croatia) | GK | 2 June 2002 (aged 24) | EU | 2025 | (Croatia) Dinamo Zagreb | 2026 | Loan |
Defenders
| 2 | Marc-Oliver Kempf | (Germany) | CB / DM | 28 January 1995 (aged 31) | EU | 2024 | (Germany) Hertha BSC | 2027 | €2.50m |
| 3 | Álex Valle | (Spain) | LB / LWB | 25 April 2004 (aged 22) | EU | 2025 | (Spain) Barcelona | 2029 | €6.00m |
| 5 | Edoardo Goldaniga | (Italy) | CB | 2 November 1993 (aged 32) | EU | 2024 | (Italy) Cagliari | 2028 | €750k |
| 14 | Jacobo Ramón | (Spain) | CB | 6 January 2005 (aged 21) | EU | 2025 | (Spain) Real Madrid | 2030 | €2.50m |
| 18 | Alberto Moreno | (Spain) | LB / LWB | 5 July 1992 (aged 33) | EU | 2024 | (Spain) Villarreal | 2026 | Free |
| 28 | Ivan Smolčić | (Croatia) | RB / CB | 17 August 2000 (aged 25) | EU | 2025 | (Croatia) Rijeka | 2029 | €1.60m |
| 31 | Mërgim Vojvoda | (Kosovo) | RB / CB / LB | 1 February 1995 (aged 31) | Non-EU | 2025 | (Italy) Torino | 2028 | €2.00m |
| 34 | Diego Carlos | (Brazil) | CB | 15 March 1993 (aged 33) | Non-EU | 2025 | (Turkey) Fenerbahçe | 2026 | Loan |
| 77 | Ignace Van Der Brempt | (Belgium) | RB / RWB / RM / CB | 1 April 2002 (aged 24) | EU | 2024 | (Austria) Red Bull Salzburg | 2028 | €5.00m |
Midfielders
| 6 | Maxence Caqueret | (France) | CM / DM / AM | 15 February 2000 (aged 26) | EU | 2025 | (France) Lyon | 2029 | €15.00m |
| 8 | Sergi Roberto | (Spain) | CM / DM / RB / RWB | 7 February 1992 (aged 34) | EU | 2024 | (Spain) Barcelona | 2026 | Free |
| 10 | Nico Paz | (Argentina) | AM / CM / ST | 8 September 2004 (aged 21) | EU | 2024 | (Spain) Real Madrid | 2028 | €6.00m |
| 15 | Adrian Lahdo | (Sweden) | CM | 26 December 2007 (aged 18) | EU | 2026 | (Sweden) Hammarby IF | 2031 | €12.00m |
| 20 | Martin Baturina | (Croatia) | AM / CM | 16 February 2003 (aged 23) | EU | 2025 | (Croatia) Dinamo Zagreb | 2030 | €18.00m |
| 23 | Máximo Perrone | (Argentina) | DM / CM | 7 January 2003 (aged 23) | EU | 2024 | (England) Manchester City | 2029 | €13.00m |
| 33 | Lucas Da Cunha | (France) | CM / AM / LW | 9 June 2001 (aged 25) | EU | 2023 | (France) Nice | 2029 | €400k |
Forwards
| 7 | Álvaro Morata | (Spain) | ST / LW / SS | 23 October 1992 (aged 33) | EU | 2025 | (Italy) Milan | 2026 | Loan |
| 11 | Anastasios Douvikas | (Greece) | ST | 2 August 1999 (aged 26) | EU | 2025 | (Spain) Celta Vigo | 2029 | €14.00m |
| 17 | Jesús Rodríguez | (Spain) | LW / RW | 21 November 2005 (aged 20) | EU | 2025 | (Spain) Real Betis | 2030 | €22.50m |
| 19 | Nicolas Kühn | (Germany) | RW / LW | 1 January 2000 (aged 26) | EU | 2025 | (Scotland) Celtic | 2029 | €19.00m |
| 38 | Assane Diao | (Senegal) | LW / ST / RW | 7 September 2005 (aged 20) | EU | 2025 | (Spain) Real Betis | 2029 | €12.00m |
| 42 | Jayden Addai | (Netherlands) | RW / LW | 26 August 2005 (aged 20) | EU | 2025 | (Netherlands) AZ | 2030 | €14.00m |

== Transfers ==
=== Summer window ===
Deals officialised beforehand were effective starting from 1 July 2025.

==== In ====
| Date | Pos. | Player | Age | Moving from | Fee | Notes | Source |
|---|---|---|---|---|---|---|---|
| 28 April 2025 | DF | (Belgium) Ignace Van Der Brempt | 23 | (Austria) Red Bull Salzburg | €5,000,000 | From loan to definitive purchase | |
| 3 June 2025 | DF | (Spain) Álex Valle | 21 | (Spain) Barcelona | €6,000,000 | From loan to definitive purchase | |
| 16 June 2025 | MF | (Croatia) Martin Baturina | 22 | (Croatia) Dinamo Zagreb | €18,000,000 | + €5,000,000 add-ons | |
| 20 June 2025 | DF | (Italy) Fellipe Jack | 19 | (Brazil) Palmeiras | €2,000,000 | From loan to definitive purchase | |
| 30 June 2025 | MF | (Italy) Luca Mazzitelli | 29 | (Italy) Frosinone | €2,000,000 | From loan to definitive purchase | |
| 2 July 2025 | FW | (Spain) Jesús Rodríguez | 19 | (Spain) Real Betis | €22,500,000 | + €6,000,000 add-ons | |
| 4 July 2025 | FW | (Netherlands) Jayden Addai | 20 | (Netherlands) AZ | €14,000,000 | | |
| 11 July 2025 | FW | (Germany) Nicolas Kühn | 25 | (Scotland) Celtic | €19,000,000 | | |
| 18 July 2025 | MF | (Argentina) Máximo Perrone | 22 | (England) Manchester City | €13,000,000 | From loan to definitive purchase | |
| 31 July 2025 | DF | (Spain) Jacobo Ramón | 20 | (Spain) Real Madrid | €2,500,000 | | |
| 31 August 2025 | GK | (Sweden) Noel Törnqvist | 23 | (Sweden) Mjällby AIF | Undisclosed | | |

==== Loan returns ====
| Date | Pos. | Player | Age | Moving from | Fee | Notes | Source |
|---|---|---|---|---|---|---|---|
| 30 June 2025 | DF | (Italy) Marco Sala | 26 | (Italy) Lecce | Free | | |
| 30 June 2025 | FW | (Italy) Alberto Cerri | 29 | (Italy) Salernitana | Free | | |
| 30 June 2025 | FW | (Italy) Simone Verdi | 33 | (Italy) Sassuolo | Free | | |

==== Loans in ====
| Date | Pos. | Player | Age | Moving from | Fee | Notes | Source |
|---|---|---|---|---|---|---|---|
| 5 August 2025 | GK | (Brazil) Henrique Menke | 18 | (Brazil) Internacional | Free | With option to buy | |
| 12 August 2025 | FW | (Spain) Álvaro Morata | 32 | (Italy) Milan | €1,000,000 | With conditional obligation to buy | |
| 29 August 2025 | GK | (Croatia) Nikola Čavlina | 23 | (Croatia) Dinamo Zagreb | €150,000 | With option to buy | |
| 1 September 2025 | DF | (Austria) Stefan Posch | 28 | (Italy) Bologna | €500,000 | With option to buy | |
| 1 September 2025 | DF | (Brazil) Diego Carlos | 32 | (Turkey) Fenerbahçe | €2,800,000 | | |
| 15 September 2025 | MF | (Hungary) Levente Bősze | 16 | (Slovakia) Dunajská Streda | Free | Joined Primavera roster | |

Total spending: €107.45M ▼

==== Out ====
| Date | Pos. | Player | Age | Moving to | Fee | Notes | Source |
|---|---|---|---|---|---|---|---|
| 15 May 2025 | DF | (Cyprus) Nicholas Ioannou | 29 | (Italy) Sampdoria | €1,500,000 | From loan to definitive purchase | |
| 20 May 2025 | GK | (Spain) Pepe Reina | 43 | Unattached | Free | Retired | |
| 22 May 2025 | MF | (Italy) Alessio Iovine | 34 | Unattached | Free | Retired | |
| 26 May 2025 | GK | (Italy) Simone Ghidotti | 25 | (Italy) Sampdoria | €400,000 | From loan to definitive purchase | |
| 23 June 2025 | MF | (Italy) Alessandro Bellemo | 30 | (Italy) Sampdoria | €2,000,000 | From loan to definitive purchase | |
| 30 June 2025 | GK | (Italy) Pierre Bolchini | 26 | Unattached | Free | End of contract | |
| 5 July 2025 | DF | (Italy) Diego Ronco | 20 | (Italy) Monopoli | Undisclosed | After return from loan | |
| 12 July 2025 | MF | (Italy) Marco Tremolada | 21 | (Italy) Pergolettese | Free | After return from loan | |
| 25 July 2025 | DF | (Italy) Marco Curto | 26 | (Italy) Empoli | €750,000 | After return from loan | |
| 31 July 2025 | FW | (Brazil) Gabriel Strefezza | 28 | (Greece) Olympiacos | €8,000,000 | | |
| 19 August 2025 | MF | (Denmark) Oliver Abildgaard | 29 | (Italy) Sampdoria | Undisclosed | After return from loan | |
| 21 August 2025 | FW | (Republic of Ireland) Liam Kerrigan | 25 | (Italy) Ternana | Free | After return from loan | |
| 1 September 2025 | FW | (Italy) Andrea Belotti | 31 | (Italy) Cagliari | Free | After return from loan | |
| 1 September 2025 | MF | (England) Dele Alli | 29 | Unattached | Free | Contract termination | |
| 3 September 2025 | FW | (Republic of Ireland) Naj Razi | 18 | Unattached | Free | Contract termination, from Primavera squad | |
| 12 September 2025 | FW | (Switzerland) Samuel Ballet | 24 | (Turkey) Antalyaspor | Undisclosed | After return from loan | |
| 19 September 2025 | DF | (Slovakia) Peter Kováčik | 23 | (Slovakia) Podbrezová | Free | After return from loan | |

==== Loans ended ====
| Date | Pos. | Player | Age | Moving to | Fee | Notes | Source |
|---|---|---|---|---|---|---|---|
| 30 June 2025 | FW | (France) Jonathan Ikoné | 27 | (Italy) Fiorentina | Free | | |

==== Loans out ====
| Date | Pos. | Player | Age | Moving to | Fee | Notes | Source |
|---|---|---|---|---|---|---|---|
| 4 July 2025 | FW | (Italy) Tommaso Fumagalli | 25 | (Italy) Virtus Entella | Free | After return from loan | |
| 17 July 2025 | FW | (Italy) Federico Chinetti | 19 | (Italy) Trento | Free | From Primavera squad | |
| 18 July 2025 | DF | (Italy) Tommaso Nucifero | 19 | (Italy) Giana Erminio | Free | From Primavera squad | |
| 21 July 2025 | MF | (Italy) Fabio Rispoli | 18 | (Italy) Catanzaro | Free | From Primavera squad | |
| 27 July 2025 | GK | (Indonesia) Emil Audero | 28 | (Italy) Cremonese | Free | After return from loan | |
| 28 July 2025 | MF | (The Gambia) Alieu Fadera | 23 | (Italy) Sassuolo | €1,000,000 | With option to buy | |
| 30 July 2025 | MF | (Italy) Luca Mazzitelli | 29 | (Italy) Cagliari | Undisclosed | After definitive purchase | |
| 6 August 2025 | MF | (Austria) Matthias Braunöder | 23 | (Italy) Bari | Free | | |
| 28 August 2025 | FW | (Spain) Iván Azón | 22 | (England) Ipswich Town | Free | | |
| 29 August 2025 | FW | (Italy) Patrick Cutrone | 27 | (Italy) Parma | Free | With option to buy | |
| 29 August 2025 | FW | (Iraq) Ali Jasim | 21 | (Saudi Arabia) Al-Najma | Free | After return from loan | |
| 30 August 2025 | FW | (Italy) Alessandro Gabrielloni | 31 | (Italy) Juve Stabia | Free | | |
| 31 August 2025 | GK | (Sweden) Noel Törnqvist | 23 | (Sweden) Mjällby AIF | Free | Loaned right after purchase | |
| 1 September 2025 | DF | (Italy) Fellipe Jack | 19 | (Italy) Spezia | Free | | |
| 1 September 2025 | MF | (Germany) Yannik Engelhardt | 24 | (Germany) Borussia Mönchengladbach | Free | | |
| 1 September 2025 | MF | (Italy) Giuseppe Mazzaglia | 19 | (Italy) Piacenza | Free | From Primavera squad | |
| 1 September 2025 | DF | (Italy) Tommaso Cassandro | 25 | (Italy) Catanzaro | Free | Loan renewed | |
| 1 September 2025 | MF | (Ivory Coast) Ben Lhassine Kone | 25 | (Italy) Frosinone | Free | Loan renewed, with option to buy | |
| 1 September 2025 | FW | (Italy) Thomas Diego Altomonte | 18 | (Italy) Pro Sesto | Free | From Primavera squad | |

Total income: €13.65M ▲
Net spend: €93.8M ▼

=== Winter window ===
Deals officialised beforehand were effective starting from 2 January 2026.

==== In ====
| Date | Pos. | Player | Age | Moving from | Fee | Notes | Source |
|---|---|---|---|---|---|---|---|
| 21 January 2026 | DF | (Austria) Stefan Posch | 28 | (Italy) Bologna | €5,500,000 | From loan to definitive purchase | |
| 2 February 2026 | MF | (Sweden) Adrian Lahdo | 18 | (Sweden) Hammarby IF | €12,000,000 | | |

==== Loans returns ====
| Date | Pos. | Player | Age | Moving from | Fee | Notes | Source |
|---|---|---|---|---|---|---|---|
| 20 December 2025 | GK | (Sweden) Noel Törnqvist | 23 | (Sweden) Mjällby AIF | Free | | |

Total spending: €17.5M ▼

==== Out ====
| Date | Pos. | Player | Age | Moving to | Fee | Notes | Source |
|---|---|---|---|---|---|---|---|
| 20 December 2025 | DF | (Italy) Marco Sala | 26 | (Italy) Avellino | Undisclosed | | |
| 23 December 2025 | FW | (Italy) Simone Verdi | 33 | (Italy) Südtirol | Free | | |
| 30 January 2026 | FW | (Italy) Manuel Pisano | 19 | (Italy) Vis Pesaro | Free | Contract termination, from Primavera squad | |
| 2 February 2026 | FW | (Italy) Alberto Cerri | 29 | (Italy) Cesena | Undisclosed | | |

==== Loans out ====
| Date | Pos. | Player | Age | Moving to | Fee | Notes | Source |
|---|---|---|---|---|---|---|---|
| 21 January 2026 | DF | (Italy) Alberto Dossena | 27 | (Italy) Cagliari | Undisclosed | | |
| 22 January 2026 | DF | (Austria) Stefan Posch | 28 | (Germany) Mainz 05 | Undisclosed | | |
| 23 January 2026 | FW | (Italy) Thomas Diego Altomonte | 19 | (Italy) Asti | Free | After return from loan | |
| 30 January 2026 | FW | (Italy) Patrick Cutrone | 28 | (Italy) Monza | Free | After return from loan | |
| 2 February 2026 | MF | (France) Andréa Le Borgne | 19 | (Italy) Avellino | Free | From Primavera squad | |
| 2 February 2026 | DF | (Italy) Fellipe Jack | 19 | (Italy) Catanzaro | Free | After return from loan | |
| 2 February 2026 | FW | (Italy) Tommaso Fumagalli | 25 | (Italy) Reggiana | Free | After return from loan | |
| 2 February 2026 | MF | (Italy) Jacopo Simonetta | 20 | (Italy) Siracusa | Free | From Primavera squad | |

Total income: €0M ▲
Net spend: €17.5M ▼

== Pre-season and friendlies ==
Win Draw Loss Fixtures

| 18 July 2025 Friendly | Como (Italy) | 3–2 | (France) Lille | Como, Italy |
| 19:30 CEST (UTC+2) | Strefezza 30'; Azón 57', 81' | Report | Fernandez-Pardo 72'; Lachaab 78' | Stadium: Stadio Giuseppe Sinigaglia; Referee: Kevin Bonacina |
Note: Match was played in two periods of 40 minutes each.

| 23 July 2025 Como Cup SF | Como (Italy) | 3–1 | (Saudi Arabia) Al-Ahli | Como, Italy |
| 20:30 CEST (UTC+2) | Cutrone 30'; Demiral 48' (o.g.); Azón 69' | Report | Galeno 7' | Stadium: Stadio Giuseppe Sinigaglia; Referee: Andrea Calzavara |

| 27 July 2025 Como Cup 1F | Como (Italy) | 3–0 | (Netherlands) Ajax | Como, Italy |
| 20:00 CEST (UTC+2) | Paz 26' (pen.); Baturina 46'; Douvikas 64' (pen.) | Report | | Stadium: Stadio Giuseppe Sinigaglia; Referee: Kevin Bonacina |

| 6 August 2025 Friendly | Real Betis (Spain) | 2–3 | (Italy) Como | La Línea de la Concepción, Spain |
| 20:30 CEST (UTC+2) | Isco 55' (pen.); Firpo 63' | Report | Diao 4'; Da Cunha 36'; Azón 90' | Stadium: Estadio de la Línea; Referee: José Antonio Palomares Gutiérrez |

| 10 August 2025 Joan Gamper Trophy | Barcelona (Spain) | 5–0 | (Italy) Como | Sant Joan Despí, Spain |
| 21:00 CEST (UTC+2) | López 21', 35'; Raphinha 37'; Yamal 42', 48' | Report | | Stadium: Estadi Johan Cruyff; Attendance: 6,000; Referee: Ricardo de Burgos Bengoetxea |

== Competitions ==
=== Overall record ===
| Competition | First match | Last match | Starting round | Final position | Record | | | | | | | |
| Competition | First match | Last match | Starting round | Final position | Pld | W | D | L | GF | GA | GD | Win % |
|---|---|---|---|---|---|---|---|---|---|---|---|---|
| Serie A | 24 August 2025 | 24 May 2026 | Matchday 1 | 4th | 38 | 20 | 11 | 7 | 65 | 29 | +36 | 52.63 |
| Coppa Italia | 16 August 2025 | 21 April 2026 | First round | Semi-finals | 6 | 3 | 2 | 1 | 12 | 6 | +6 | 50.00 |
| Total | | | | | 44 | 23 | 13 | 8 | 77 | 35 | +42 | 52.27 |

Source: Soccerway

=== Serie A ===
==== League table ====
| Pos | Team | Pld | W | D | L | GF | GA | GD | Pts | Qualification or relegation |
|---|---|---|---|---|---|---|---|---|---|---|
| 2 | Napoli | 38 | 23 | 7 | 8 | 58 | 36 | +22 | 76 | Qualification for the UEFA Champions League league phase |
| 3 | Roma | 38 | 23 | 4 | 11 | 59 | 31 | +28 | 73 | Qualification for the UEFA Champions League league phase |
| 4 | Como | 38 | 20 | 11 | 7 | 65 | 29 | +36 | 71 | Qualification for the UEFA Champions League league phase |
| 5 | AC Milan | 38 | 20 | 10 | 8 | 53 | 35 | +18 | 70 | Qualification for the UEFA Europa League league phase (Note: Since the 2025–26 Coppa Italia winners, Inter Milan, qualified for the Champions League via league position, the Europa League spot awarded to the cup winners was passed to the sixth-placed team, and the Conference League spot was moved down one league position.) |
| 6 | Juventus | 38 | 19 | 12 | 7 | 61 | 34 | +27 | 69 | Qualification for the UEFA Europa League league phase |

Source: Serie A
Rules for classification: 1) Points; 2) Tiebreaker for Champions team and third relegated team; 3) Head-to-head points; 4) Head-to-head goal difference; 5) Goal difference; 6) Goals scored; 7) Draw.
(Note: Head-to-head record is used only after all the matches between the teams in question have been played)

==== Results summary ====
| Overall | | | | | | | | Home | | | | | | Away | | | | | |
| Pld | W | D | L | GF | GA | GD | Pts | W | D | L | GF | GA | GD | W | D | L | GF | GA | GD |
|---|---|---|---|---|---|---|---|---|---|---|---|---|---|---|---|---|---|---|---|
| 38 | 20 | 11 | 7 | 65 | 29 | +36 | 71 | 10 | 6 | 3 | 35 | 15 | +20 | 10 | 5 | 4 | 30 | 14 | +16 |

Source: Serie A

==== Results by round ====
| Round | 1 | 2 | 3 | 4 | 5 | 6 | 7 | 8 | 9 | 10 | 11 | 12 | 13 | 14 | 15 | 16 | 17 | 18 | 19 | 20 | 21 | 22 | 23 | 24 | 25 | 26 | 27 | 28 | 29 | 30 | 31 | 32 | 33 | 34 | 35 | 36 | 37 | 38 |
|---|---|---|---|---|---|---|---|---|---|---|---|---|---|---|---|---|---|---|---|---|---|---|---|---|---|---|---|---|---|---|---|---|---|---|---|---|---|---|
| Ground | H | A | H | A | H | A | H | A | H | A | H | A | H | A | A | H | A | H | A | H | A | H | H | A | H | A | H | A | H | H | A | H | A | A | H | A | H | A |
| Result | W | L | D | W | D | D | W | D | W | D | D | W | W | L | L | L | W | W | W | D | W | W | D | D | L | W | W | W | W | W | D | L | L | W | D | W | W | W |
| Position | 2 | 9 | 9 | 8 | 8 | 9 | 7 | 8 | 8 | 7 | 7 | 6 | 5 | 6 | 7 | 7 | 6 | 6 | 6 | 6 | 6 | 6 | 6 | 6 | 7 | 6 | 5 | 4 | 4 | 4 | 4 | 5 | 5 | 5 | 6 | 6 | 5 | 4 |

Source: Serie A
A = Away; H = Home; W = Win; D = Draw; L = Loss; P = Postponed
Notes:
- Positions show the situation at the end of the corresponding gameweeks (GW), not the position at the conclusion of matches or game days.

==== Matches ====
The league fixtures was released on 6 June 2025.

Win Draw Loss Fixtures

| 24 August 2025 1 | Como | 2–0 | Lazio | Como |
| 18:30 CEST (UTC+2) | Douvikas 47'; Paz 73' | Report | | Stadium: Stadio Giuseppe Sinigaglia; Attendance: 12,055; Referee: Gianluca Manganiello |

| 30 August 2025 2 | Bologna | 1–0 | Como | Bologna |
| 18:30 CEST (UTC+2) | Orsolini 52' | Report | | Stadium: Stadio Renato Dall'Ara; Attendance: 28,369; Referee: Daniele Doveri |

| 15 September 2025 3 | Como | 1–1 | Genoa | Como |
| 20:45 CEST (UTC+2) | Paz 13' | Report | Ekuban 90+2' | Stadium: Stadio Giuseppe Sinigaglia; Attendance: 11,858; Referee: Marco Piccinini |

| 21 September 2025 4 | Fiorentina | 1–2 | Como | Florence |
| 18:00 CEST (UTC+2) | Mandragora 6' | Report | Kempf 65'; Addai 90+4' | Stadium: Stadio Artemio Franchi; Attendance: 21,158; Referee: Kevin Bonacina |

| 27 September 2025 5 | Como | 1–1 | Cremonese | Como |
| 15:00 CEST (UTC+2) | Paz 32' | Report | Baschirotto 69' | Stadium: Stadio Giuseppe Sinigaglia; Attendance: 10,534; Referee: Marco Di Bello |

| 4 October 2025 6 | Atalanta | 1–1 | Como | Bergamo |
| 20:45 CEST (UTC+2) | Samardžić 6' | Report | Perrone 19' | Stadium: Gewiss Stadium; Attendance: 23,042; Referee: Luca Zufferli |

| 19 October 2025 7 | Como | 2–0 | Juventus | Como |
| 12:30 CEST (UTC+2) | Kempf 4'; Paz 79' | Report | | Stadium: Stadio Giuseppe Sinigaglia; Attendance: 12,039; Referee: Giovanni Ayroldi |

| 25 October 2025 8 | Parma | 0–0 | Como | Parma |
| 15:00 CET (UTC+1) | | Report | | Stadium: Stadio Ennio Tardini; Attendance: 18,116; Referee: Daniele Chiffi |

| 29 October 2025 9 | Como | 3–1 | Hellas Verona | Como |
| 18:30 CET (UTC+1) | Douvikas 9'; Posch 62'; Vojvoda 90+2' | Report | Serdar 25' | Stadium: Stadio Giuseppe Sinigaglia; Attendance: 10,167; Referee: Matteo Marcenaro |

| 1 November 2025 10 | Napoli | 0–0 | Como | Naples |
| 18:00 CET (UTC+1) | | Report | | Stadium: Stadio Diego Armando Maradona; Attendance: 52,000; Referee: Luca Zufferli |

| 8 November 2025 11 | Como | 0–0 | Cagliari | Como |
| 15:00 CET (UTC+1) | Addai (yellow card) 60'; Morata (yellow card) 62'; Perrone (yellow card) 89' | Report | Prati (yellow card) 70' | Stadium: Stadio Giuseppe Sinigaglia; Attendance: 11,517; Referee: Ivan Pezzuto |

| 24 November 2025 12 | Torino | 1–5 | Como | Turin |
| 18:30 CET (UTC+1) | Vlašić 45+2' (pen.) | Report | Addai 36', 52'; Ramón 71'; Paz 76'; Baturina 86' | Stadium: Stadio Olimpico Grande Torino; Attendance: 22,188; Referee: Kevin Bonacina |

| 28 November 2025 13 | Como | 2–0 | Sassuolo | Como |
| 20:45 CET (UTC+1) | Douvikas 14'; Moreno 53' | Report | | Stadium: Stadio Giuseppe Sinigaglia; Attendance: 10,243; Referee: Matteo Marchetti |

| 6 December 2025 14 | Internazionale | 4–0 | Como | Milan |
| 18:00 CET (UTC+1) | L. Martínez 11'; Thuram 59'; Çalhanoglu 80'; Carlos Augusto 86'; Akanji (yellow card) 86' | Report | Perrone (yellow card) 44'; Diego Carlos (yellow card) 45+2' | Stadium: San Siro; Attendance: 75,022; Referee: Marco Di Bello |

| 15 December 2025 15 | Roma | 1–0 | Como | Rome |
| 20:45 CET (UTC+1) | Wesley 60' | Report | | Stadium: Stadio Olimpico; Attendance: 60,207; Referee: Ermanno Feliciani |

| 27 December 2025 17 | Lecce | 0–3 | Como | Lecce |
| 15:00 CET (UTC+1) | Sottil (yellow card) 22'; Ramadani (yellow card) 81' | Report | Paz 20'; Smolčić (yellow card) 34'; Butez (yellow card) 54'; Diego Carlos (yellow card) 56'; Ramón 66'; Perrone (yellow card) 71'; Douvikas 75' | Stadium: Stadio Via del mare Attendance: 28,277; Referee: Matteo Marchetti |

| 3 January 2026 18 | Como | 1–0 | Udinese | Como |
| 12:30 CET (UTC+1) | Da Cunha 18' (pen.); Rodríguez (yellow card) 67' | Report | Kamara (yellow card) 32'; Kabasele (yellow card) 70'; Ehizibue (yellow card) 86' | Stadium: Stadio Giuseppe Sinigaglia; Attendance: 11,914; Referee: Alberto Arena |

| 6 January 2026 19 | Pisa | 0–3 | Como | Pisa |
| 15:00 CET (UTC+1) | Aebischer (yellow card) 22'; Coppola (yellow card) 90+5' | Report | Da Cunha (yellow card) 24'; Ramón (yellow card) 45'; Perrone 68'; Douvikas 76', 90+6' (pen.) | Stadium: Arena Garibaldi – Stadio Romeo Anconetani; Attendance: 11,202; Referee: Luca Pairetto |

| 10 January 2026 20 | Como | 1–1 | Bologna | Como |
| 15:00 CET (UTC+1) | Paz (yellow card) 40'; Da Cunha (yellow card) 48'; Van Der Brempt (yellow card) 61'; Baturina 90+4' | Report | Cambiaghi 49', (red card) 61'; Freuler (yellow card) 64'; Zortea (yellow card) 70'; Ferguson (yellow card) 83' | Stadium: Stadio Giuseppe Sinigaglia; Attendance: 11,667; Referee: Rosario Abisso |

| 15 January 2026 16 | Como | 1–3 | Milan | Como |
| 20:45 CET (UTC+1) | Kempf 10'; Ramón (yellow card) 90+1' | Report | Nkunku 45+1' (pen.); Rabiot 55', 88' | Stadium: Stadio Giuseppe Sinigaglia; Attendance: 11,667; Referee: Marco Guida |
Note: The match was originally scheduled for 21 December 2025, but was postponed due to Milan's participation in the Supercoppa Italiana.

| 19 January 2026 21 | Lazio | 0–3 | Como | Rome |
| 20:45 CET (UTC+1) | | Report | Baturina 2'; Paz 24', 49' | Stadium: Stadio Olimpico; Attendance: 35,000; Referee: Michael Fabbri |

| 24 January 2026 22 | Como | 6–0 | Torino | Como |
| 15:00 CET (UTC+1) | Douvikas 8', 66'; Baturina 16'; Da Cunha 59' (pen.); Kuhn 70'; Caqueret 76' | Report | | Stadium: Stadio Giuseppe Sinigaglia; Attendance: 11,055; Referee: Ermanno Feliciani |

| 1 February 2026 23 | Como | 0–0 | Atalanta | Como |
| 15:00 CET (UTC+1) | | Report | | Stadium: Stadio Giuseppe Sinigaglia; Attendance: 11,925; Referee: Luca Pairetto |

| 14 February 2026 25 | Como | 1–2 | Fiorentina | Como |
| 15:00 CET (UTC+1) | Parisi 77' (o.g.) | Report | Fagioli 26'; Kean 54' (pen.) | Stadium: Stadio Giuseppe Sinigaglia; Attendance: 11,387; Referee: Matteo Marchetti |

| 18 February 2026 24 | Milan | 1–1 | Como | Milan |
| 20:45 CET (UTC+1) | Leão 64', (yellow card) 68'; Saelemaekers (yellow card) 87' | Report | Paz 32', (yellow card) 53'; Butez (yellow card) 63'; Roberto (yellow card) 68' | Stadium: San Siro; Attendance: 75,251; Referee: Maurizio Mariani |
Note: The match was originally scheduled for 8 February 2026, but was postponed due to scheduling conflicts with the 2026 Winter Olympics opening ceremony.

| 21 February 2026 26 | Juventus | 0–2 | Como | Turin |
| 15:00 CET (UTC+1) | | Report | Vojvoda 11'; Caqueret 61' | Stadium: Juventus Stadium; Attendance: 40,822; Referee: Daniele Doveri |

| 28 February 2026 27 | Como | 3–1 | Lecce | Como |
| 15:00 CET (UTC+1) | Douvikas 18'; Rodriguez 35'; Kempf 44' | Report | Coulibaly 13' | Stadium: Stadio Giuseppe Sinigaglia; Attendance: 10,817; Referee: Francesco Fourneau |

| 7 March 2026 28 | Cagliari | 1–2 | Como | Cagliari |
| 15:00 CET (UTC+1) | Esposito 56' | Report | Baturina 14'; Da Cunha 76' | Stadium: Unipol Domus; Attendance: 16,128; Referee: Livio Marinelli |

| 15 March 2026 29 | Como | 2–1 | Roma | Como |
| 18:00 CET (UTC+1) | Douvikas 59'; Diego Carlos 79' | Report | Malen 7' (pen.) | Stadium: Stadio Giuseppe Sinigaglia; Attendance: 11,977; Referee: Davide Massa |

| 22 March 2026 30 | Como | 5–0 | Pisa | Como |
| 12:00 CET (UTC+1) | Diao 7'; Douvikas 29'; Baturina 48'; Paz 75'; Perrone 81' | Report | | Stadium: Stadio Giuseppe Sinigaglia; Attendance: 11,137; Referee: Luca Pairetto |

| 6 April 2026 31 | Udinese | 0–0 | Como | Udine |
| 12:30 CEST (UTC+2) | | Report | | Stadium: Stadio Friuli; Attendance: 24,347; Referee: Fabio Maresca |

| 12 April 2026 32 | Como | 3–4 | Internazionale | Como |
| 20:45 CEST (UTC+2) | Valle (yellow card) 24', (goal) 36'; Paz 45'; Diao (yellow card) 55'; Da Cunha 89' (pen.); Ramón (yellow card) 90+1' | Report | Thuram 45+1', 49'; Zieliński (yellow card) 53'; Dumfries 58', 72'; Çalhanoğlu (yellow card) 69'; Sučić (yellow card) 77'; Acerbi (yellow card) 79'; Carlos Augusto (yellow card) 83'; Bonny (yellow card) 87'; Akanji (yellow card) 90+1' | Stadium: Stadio Giuseppe Sinigaglia; Attendance: 11,975; Referee: Davide Massa |

| 17 April 2026 33 | Sassuolo | 2–1 | Como | Sassuolo |
| 18:30 CEST (UTC+2) | Volpato 42'; Nzola 44' | Report | Paz 45+2' | Stadium: Mapei Stadium – Città del Tricolore; Attendance: 13,355; Referee: Francesco Fourneau |

| 26 April 2026 34 | Genoa | 0–2 | Como | Genoa |
| 15:00 CEST (UTC+2) | | Report | Douvikas 10'; Diao 68' | Stadium: Stadio Luigi Ferraris; Attendance: 31,901; Referee: Federico La Penna |

| 2 May 2026 35 | Como | 0–0 | Napoli | Como |
| 18:00 CEST (UTC+2) | | Report | | Stadium: Stadio Giuseppe Sinigaglia; Attendance: 11,969; Referee: Michael Fabbri |

| 10 May 2026 36 | Hellas Verona | 0–1 | Como | Verona |
| 12:30 CEST (UTC+2) | | Report | Douvikas 71' | Stadium: Stadio Marcantonio Bentegodi; Attendance: 23,086; Referee: Marco Di Bello |

| 17 May 2026 37 | Como | 1–0 | Parma | Como |
| 12:30 CEST (UTC+2) | Moreno 58' | Report | | Stadium: Stadio Giuseppe Sinigaglia; Attendance: 11,365; Referee: Luca Zufferli |

| 24 May 2026 38 | Cremonese | 1–4 | Como | Cremona |
| 20:45 CEST (UTC+2) | Bonazzoli 55' | Report | Rodríguez 35'; Douvikas 51'; Da Cunha 74', 81' | Stadium: Stadio Giovanni Zini; Referee: Enzo Maresca |

=== Coppa Italia ===
Win Draw Loss Fixtures

| 16 August 2025 First round | Como | 3–1 | Südtirol | Como |
| 18:30 CEST (UTC+2) | Douvikas 39', 40'; Da Cunha 42'; Roberto (yellow card) 49' | Report | Casiraghi 13' (pen.); Bordon (yellow card) 69' (yellow-red card) 88' | Stadium: Stadio Giuseppe Sinigaglia; Attendance: 9,985; Referee: Simone Galipò |

| 24 September 2025 Second round | Como | 3–0 | Sassuolo | Como |
| 21:00 CEST (UTC+2) | Rodríguez 2', 41'; Douvikas 25' | Report | | Stadium: Stadio Giuseppe Sinigaglia; Attendance: 5,212; Referee: Niccolò Turrini |

| 27 January 2026 Round of 16 | Fiorentina | 1–3 | Como | Florence |
| 21:00 CET (UTC+1) | Piccoli 25' | Report | Roberto 20'; Paz 60'; Morata 90+1' | Stadium: Stadio Artemio Franchi; Attendance: 10,472; Referee: Giovanni Ayroldi |

| 10 February 2026 Quarter finals | Napoli | 1–1 (6–7 p) | Como | Naples |
| 21:00 CET (UTC+1) | Vergara 46' | Report | Baturina 39' (pen.) | Stadium: Stadio Diego Armando Maradona; Attendance: 50,000; Referee: Gianluca Manganiello |
| | Penalties |
| | Politano (penalty scored); Lukaku (penalty missed); Spinazzola (penalty scored); Alisson (penalty scored); Elmas (penalty scored); Milinković-Savić (penalty scored); Gutiérrez (penalty scored); Lobotka (penalty missed) | | (penalty scored) Da Cunha; (penalty scored) Douvikas; (penalty scored) Baturina; (penalty missed) Perrone; (penalty scored) Smolčić; (penalty scored) Diego Carlos; (penalty scored) Vojvoda; (penalty scored) Kempf |

| 3 March 2026 Semi-finals | Como | 0–0 | Internazionale | Como |
| 21:00 CEST (UTC+2) | | Report | | Stadium: Stadio Giuseppe Sinigaglia; Attendance: 10,324; Referee: Marco Di Bello |

| 21 April 2026 Semi-finals; Second leg | Internazionale | 3–2 (3–2 agg.) | Como | Milan |
| 21:00 CEST (UTC+2) | Çalhanoğlu 69', 86'; Sučić 89' | Report | Baturina 32'; Da Cunha 47'; Perrone (yellow card) 90+4' | Stadium: San Siro; Attendance: 73,255; Referee: Simone Sozza |

== Statistics ==
=== Appearances and goals ===
List includes all first team players and any other matchday squad players

| No. | Pos | Nat | Player | Total | | Serie A | | Coppa Italia | |
| No. | Pos | Nat | Player | Apps | Goals | Apps | Goals | Apps | Goals |
Goalkeepers
| 1 | GK | (France) FRA | Jean Butez | 44 | 0 | 38 | 0 | 6 | 0 |
| 21 | GK | (Sweden) SWE | Noel Törnqvist | 0 | 0 | 0 | 0 | 0 | 0 |
| 12 | GK | (Brazil) BRA | Henrique Menke | 0 | 0 | 0 | 0 | 0 | 0 |
| 22 | GK | (Italy) ITA | Mauro Vigorito | 0 | 0 | 0 | 0 | 0 | 0 |
| 44 | GK | (Croatia) CRO | Nikola Čavlina | 0 | 0 | 0 | 0 | 0 | 0 |
Defenders
| 2 | DF | (Germany) GER | Marc-Oliver Kempf | 38 | 4 | 27+7 | 4 | 3+1 | 0 |
| 3 | DF | (Spain) ESP | Álex Valle | 31 | 1 | 22+6 | 1 | 3 | 0 |
| 5 | DF | (Italy) ITA | Edoardo Goldaniga | 3 | 0 | 0+2 | 0 | 1 | 0 |
| 14 | DF | (Spain) ESP | Jacobo Ramón | 37 | 2 | 30+2 | 2 | 5 | 0 |
| 18 | DF | (Spain) ESP | Alberto Moreno | 23 | 2 | 13+6 | 2 | 3+1 | 0 |
| 28 | DF | (Croatia) CRO | Ivan Smolčić | 32 | 0 | 18+10 | 0 | 2+2 | 0 |
| 31 | DF | (Kosovo) KOS | Mërgim Vojvoda | 34 | 1 | 18+12 | 1 | 2+2 | 0 |
| 34 | DF | (Brazil) BRA | Diego Carlos | 31 | 1 | 22+5 | 1 | 4 | 0 |
| 77 | DF | (Belgium) BEL | Ignace Van Der Brempt | 23 | 0 | 12+8 | 0 | 2+1 | 0 |
Midfielders
| 6 | MF | (France) FRA | Maxence Caqueret | 36 | 1 | 17+13 | 1 | 4+2 | 0 |
| 8 | MF | (Spain) ESP | Sergi Roberto | 24 | 1 | 7+13 | 0 | 4 | 1 |
| 10 | MF | (Argentina) ARG | Nico Paz | 39 | 13 | 32+2 | 12 | 4+1 | 1 |
| 15 | MF | (Sweden) SWE | Adrian Lahdo | 0 | 0 | 0 | 0 | 0 | 0 |
| 20 | MF | (Croatia) CRO | Martin Baturina | 34 | 8 | 17+12 | 6 | 3+2 | 2 |
| 23 | MF | (Argentina) ARG | Máximo Perrone | 41 | 3 | 33+3 | 3 | 3+2 | 0 |
| 33 | MF | (France) FRA | Lucas Da Cunha | 42 | 8 | 30+6 | 6 | 5+1 | 2 |
Forwards
| 7 | FW | (Spain) ESP | Álvaro Morata | 30 | 1 | 10+16 | 0 | 0+4 | 1 |
| 11 | FW | (Greece) GRE | Anastasios Douvikas | 44 | 17 | 25+13 | 14 | 4+2 | 3 |
| 17 | FW | (Spain) ESP | Jesús Rodríguez | 36 | 4 | 18+13 | 2 | 3+2 | 2 |
| 19 | FW | (Germany) GER | Nicolas Kühn | 25 | 1 | 6+17 | 1 | 1+1 | 0 |
| 38 | FW | (Senegal) SEN | Assane Diao | 20 | 2 | 13+4 | 2 | 0+3 | 0 |
| 42 | FW | (Netherlands) NED | Jayden Addai | 16 | 3 | 8+4 | 3 | 3+1 | 0 |
| 57 | FW | (Italy) ITA | Lorenzo Bonsignori | 1 | 0 | 0 | 0 | 0+1 | 0 |
Players transferred out during the season
| 4 | DF | (Italy) ITA | Alberto Dossena | 0 | 0 | 0 | 0 | 0 | 0 |
| 9 | FW | (Italy) ITA | Alessandro Gabrielloni | 0 | 0 | 0 | 0 | 0 | 0 |
| 15 | DF | (Italy) ITA | Fellipe Jack | 0 | 0 | 0 | 0 | 0 | 0 |
| 27 | DF | (Austria) AUT | Stefan Posch | 15 | 1 | 3+11 | 1 | 1 | 0 |
| 55 | MF | (France) FRA | Andréa Le Borgne | 1 | 0 | 0+1 | 0 | 0 | 0 |
| 63 | FW | (Italy) ITA | Patrick Cutrone | 0 | 0 | 0 | 0 | 0 | 0 |
| 90 | FW | (Spain) ESP | Iván Azón | 0 | 0 | 0 | 0 | 0 | 0 |
| 99 | FW | (Italy) ITA | Alberto Cerri | 1 | 0 | 0 | 0 | 0+1 | 0 |

=== Goalscorers ===
Players in italics left the team during the season.

| Rank | No. | Pos. | Nat. | Player | Serie A | Coppa Italia | Total |
|---|---|---|---|---|---|---|---|
| 1 | 11 | FW | (Greece) | Anastasios Douvikas | 14 | 3 | 17 |
| 2 | 10 | MF | (Argentina) | Nico Paz | 12 | 1 | 13 |
| 3 | 20 | MF | (Croatia) | Martin Baturina | 6 | 2 | 8 |
| 4 | 33 | MF | (France) | Lucas Da Cunha | 6 | 2 | 7 |
| 5 | 3 | DF | (Germany) | Marc-Oliver Kempf | 4 | 0 | 4 |
| 5 | 17 | FW | (Spain) | Jesús Rodríguez | 2 | 2 | 4 |
| 7 | 18 | DF | (Spain) | Alberto Moreno | 2 | 1 | 3 |
| 7 | 23 | MF | (Argentina) | Máximo Perrone | 3 | 0 | 3 |
| 7 | 42 | FW | (Netherlands) | Jayden Addai | 3 | 0 | 3 |
| 10 | 6 | MF | (France) | Maxence Caqueret | 2 | 0 | 2 |
| 10 | 14 | DF | (Spain) | Jacobo Ramón | 2 | 0 | 2 |
| 10 | 31 | DF | (Kosovo) | Mërgim Vojvoda | 2 | 0 | 2 |
| 10 | 38 | FW | (Senegal) | Assane Diao | 2 | 0 | 2 |
| 14 | 3 | DF | (Spain) | Álex Valle | 1 | 0 | 1 |
| 14 | 7 | FW | (Spain) | Álvaro Morata | 0 | 1 | 1 |
| 14 | 19 | FW | (Germany) | Nicolas Kühn | 1 | 0 | 1 |
| 14 | 27 | DF | (Austria) | Stefan Posch | 1 | 0 | 1 |
| 14 | 34 | DF | (Brazil) | Diego Carlos | 1 | 0 | 1 |
| Own goals | | | | | 1 | 0 | 1 |
| Totals | | | | | 65 | 12 | 77 |

=== Clean sheets ===
Players in italics left the team during the season.

| Rank | No. | Pos. | Nat. | Player | Serie A | Coppa Italia | Total |
|---|---|---|---|---|---|---|---|
| 1 | 1 | GK | (France) | Jean Butez | 19 | 2 | 21 |
| Totals | | | | | 19 | 2 | 21 |
