= Trnova =

Trnova or Trnová may refer to places:

== Bosnia and Herzegovina ==
- Trnova, Sanski Most, a village
- Trnova, Ugljevik, a populated locality

== Croatia ==
- Trnova, Croatia, a village

== Czech Republic ==
- Trnová (Plzeň-North District), a municipality and village in the Plzeň Region
- Trnová (Prague-West District), a municipality and village in the Central Bohemian Region
- Trnová, a village and part of Dobříš in the Central Bohemian Region
- Trnová, a village and part of Katusice in the Central Bohemian Region
- Trnová, an administrative part of Pardubice in the Pardubice Region
- Trnová, a village and part of Tisová (Tachov District) in the Plzeň Region

== See also ==
- Trnovo (disambiguation)
- Trnava (disambiguation)
