= Hungary national under-17 football team =

National U-17 football team

Hungary
- Nickname: The Magyars
- Association: Magyar Labdarúgó Szövetség
- Confederation: UEFA (Europe)
- Head coach: Gergő Jeremiás
- Captain: Patrik Posztobányi
- FIFA code: HUN
First colours	Second colours

FIFA U-17 World Cup
- Appearances: 2 (first in 1985)
- Best result: Quarter-finals (1985)

UEFA Under-17 Championship
- Appearances: 13 (first in 1985)
- Best result: Fifth place (2019)

The Hungary national under-17 football team represents Hungary in association football at under-17 age level and is controlled by the Hungarian Football Federation, the governing body for football in Hungary.

== Competition history ==
=== UEFA U-16/17 European Championship record ===
UEFA U-16/17 European Championship record									UEFA U-16/17 Championship Qualification record						
Year	Round	Pld	W	D	L	GF	GA	GD	Pld	W	D	L	GF	GA	GD
(Italy) 1982	did not qualify								4	3	0	1	6	4	+2
(West Germany) 1984	did not qualify								4	2	1	1	5	2	+3
(Hungary) 1985	Group stage	3	1	0	2	2	3	−1	qualified as hosts						
(Greece) 1986	did not qualify								4	1	0	3	1	4	−3
(France) 1987	did not qualify								2	0	1	1	0	1	−1
(Spain) 1988	Group stage	3	1	2	0	2	1	+1	2	1	0	1	2	2	0
(Denmark) 1989	did not qualify								4	1	1	2	3	5	−2
(East Germany) 1990	Group stage	3	0	1	2	2	6	−4	2	2	0	0	6	0	+6
(Switzerland) 1991	did not qualify								4	0	1	3	2	5	−3
(Cyprus) 1992	Group stage	3	1	1	1	4	4	0	2	1	1	0	5	3	+2
(Turkey) 1993	Quarter-finals	4	2	0	2	4	5	−1	2	2	0	0	3	0	+3
(Republic of Ireland) 1994	did not qualify								2	1	0	1	3	1	+2
(Belgium) 1995	did not qualify								4	1	1	2	7	7	0
(Austria) 1996	did not qualify								4	0	1	3	1	5	−4
(Germany) 1997	Quarter-finals	4	2	0	2	9	8	+1	2	2	0	0	7	0	+7
(Scotland) 1998	did not qualify								3	2	1	0	8	1	+7
(Czech Republic) 1999	Group stage	3	0	1	2	3	5	−2	2	1	1	0	4	2	+2
(Israel) 2000	Group stage	3	1	0	2	4	7	−3	2	2	0	0	11	0	+11
(England) 2001	Group stage	3	1	0	2	5	6	−1	2	1	1	0	3	1	+2
(Denmark) 2002	Group stage	3	0	0	3	4	11	−7	3	2	0	1	9	2	+7
(Portugal) 2003	Group stage	3	0	0	3	0	5	−5	3	2	0	1	6	3	+3
(France) 2004	did not qualify								3	1	1	1	6	3	+3
(Italy) 2005	did not qualify								3	0	1	2	1	4	−3
(Luxembourg) 2006	Group stage	3	1	0	2	4	3	+1	6	3	1	2	8	5	+3
(Belgium) 2007	did not qualify								6	3	2	1	8	5	+3
(Turkey) 2008	did not qualify								6	2	3	1	7	5	+2
(Germany) 2009	did not qualify								6	1	2	3	3	6	−3
(Liechtenstein) 2010	did not qualify								6	2	2	2	8	4	+4
(Serbia) 2011	did not qualify								6	2	4	0	6	3	+3
(Slovenia) 2012	did not qualify								6	3	1	2	12	5	+7
(Slovakia) 2013	did not qualify								6	5	1	0	16	5	+11
(Malta) 2014	did not qualify								3	0	1	2	8	11	−3
(Bulgaria) 2015	did not qualify								6	2	1	3	4	5	−1
(Azerbaijan) 2016	did not qualify								3	0	2	1	4	5	−1
(Croatia) 2017	Sixth place	5	2	1	2	8	5	+3	6	4	0	2	9	7	+2
(England) 2018	did not qualify								6	4	1	1	9	4	+5
(Republic of Ireland) 2019	Fifth place	5	3	2	0	8	5	+3	6	4	1	1	8	4	+4
(Estonia) 2020	Cancelled due to COVID-19 pandemic								3	1	2	0	3	0	+3
(Cyprus) 2021	Cancelled due to COVID-19 pandemic								Cancelled due to COVID-19 pandemic						
(Israel) 2022	did not qualify								6	2	2	2	7	5	+2
(Hungary) 2023	Group stage	3	1	0	2	8	9	–1	qualified as hosts						
(Cyprus) 2024	did not qualify								6	2	0	4	7	12	−5
(Albania) 2025	did not qualify								6	1	4	1	9	7	+2
(Estonia) 2026	did not qualify								TBD						
Total	Fifth place	48	15	8	25	59	74	-15	153	66	38	49	225	148	+77

=== FIFA U-17 World Cup record ===
FIFA U-17 World Cup record
Year	Round	Pld	W	D	L	GF	GA	GD
(China) 1985	Quarter-finals	4	2	1	1	5	3	+2
(Canada) 1987 to (India) 2017	did not qualify							
(Brazil) 2019	Group stage	3	0	1	2	6	9	−3
(Peru) ~~2021~~	Cancelled due to the COVID-19 pandemic							
(Indonesia) 2023	did not qualify							
(Qatar) 2025	did not qualify							
Total	Quarter-finals	7	2	2	3	11	12	-1

== Recent results ==
=== 2026 UEFA European Under-17 Championship qualification ===
Qualifying round

Pos	Team	Pld	W	D	L	GF	GA	GD	Pts	Qualification
1	Czech Republic	3	3	0	0	22	1	+21	9	Round 2 League A
2	North Macedonia (H)	3	1	1	1	11	4	+7	4	Round 2 League A
3	Hungary	3	1	1	1	11	9	+2	4	Round 2 League B
4	Gibraltar	3	0	0	3	0	30	−30	0	Round 2 League B

Source: UEFA
Rules for classification: Tiebreakers
(H) Hosts
8 October 2025
13:00

North Macedonia	2–2	Hungary
Stojkovski 44'; Dzangarovski 67'	Report	Polonkai 23'; Bősze 48'

Stadion Mladost, Strumica
Attendance: 200
Referee: Artem Gasparyan (Armenia)

11 October 2025
13:00

Hungary	8–0	Gibraltar
Juhász 23'; Somogyi 30', 45+4', 69'; Somfalvi 48'; Bősze 66'; Polonkai 89'; Dajka 90+5'	Report

Stadion Kukuš, Turnovo
Attendance: 35
Referee: Karl Koppel (Estonia)

14 October 2025
13:00

Hungary	1–7	Czech Republic
Bősze 89' (pen.)	Report	Zahálka 10'; Švec 28'; Srb 40', 84'; Polonkai 58' (o.g.); Cvejn 68'; Chumlen 73'

Stadion Mladost, Strumica
Attendance: 30
Referee: Artem Gasparyan (Armenia)

Elite round

==== Group B5 ====
Pos	Team	Pld	W	D	L	GF	GA	GD	Pts	Promotion
1	Hungary	1	1	0	0	4	0	+4	3	Promoted to League A for the Round 1 of the 2028 UEFA European Under-19 Championship qualification
2	Luxembourg	1	0	1	0	2	2	0	1	
3	Armenia (H)	1	0	1	0	2	2	0	1	
4	Liechtenstein	1	0	0	1	0	4	−4	0	

Updated to match(es) played on 22 April 2026. Source: UEFA
Rules for classification: Qualification tiebreakers
22 April 2026
11:00

Hungary	4–0	Liechtenstein
Somogyi 26'; Szakál 45+1'; Vasiljevic 78'; Wiesner 90+4' (pen.)	Report

Yerevan Football Academy Stadium, Yerevan
Referee: Alex Johnson (Malta)

25 April 2026
14:00

Hungary	v	Armenia
	Report

Vazgen Sargsyan Republican Stadium, Yerevan
Referee: Patryk Gryckiewicz (Poland)

28 April 2026
14:00

Luxembourg	v	Hungary
	Report

Yerevan Football Academy Stadium, Yerevan
Referee: Patryk Gryckiewicz (Poland)

== Players ==
=== Current squad ===
The following players were named in the squad for the most recent 2026 UEFA European Under-17 Championship qualification matches.

No.	Pos.	Player	Date of birth (age)	Club
1	GK	Levente Kilvinger	20 March 2009 (age 17)	(Italian Football Federation) Roma
12	GK	Mátyás Jakab	8 January 2009 (age 17)	(Italian Football Federation) Juventus
14	DF	Teo Bence Rónaszéki	11 March 2009 (age 17)	(Hungarian Football Federation) Ferencváros
3	DF	Áron Russnák	12 March 2009 (age 17)	(Hungarian Football Federation) Budapest Honvéd
4	DF	Dénes Szakál	10 April 2009 (age 17)	(Hungarian Football Federation) Debrecen
15	DF	Leonárd Ádám	13 January 2009 (age 17)	(Hungarian Football Federation) Diósgyőr
17	DF	Áron Balogh	12 July 2009 (age 17)	(Hungarian Football Federation) Vasas
5	DF	Tamás Vincze	20 January 2009 (age 17)	(Hungarian Football Federation) Debrecen
6	MF	Dániel Varga	8 April 2009 (age 17)	(Hungarian Football Federation) MTK
8	MF	Márk Serucza	18 February 2009 (age 17)	(Hungarian Football Federation) Debrecen
10	MF	Ákos Berekméri-Szigeti	9 November 2009 (age 16)	(Hungarian Football Federation) Videoton
16	MF	Márton Milkovics	28 December 2009 (age 16)	(Italian Football Federation) Vicenza
19	MF	Martin Bogdán	17 February 2009 (age 17)	(Hungarian Football Federation) Budapest Honvéd
18	MF	Tamás Somogyi	19 August 2009 (age 17)	(Hungarian Football Federation) Budapest Honvéd
7	FW	Vincent Görög	28 January 2009 (age 17)	(Hungarian Football Federation) MTK
9	FW	Andrej Vasiljevic	25 March 2010 (age 16)	(Hungarian Football Federation) MTK
11	FW	Ádám Herold	14 July 2009 (age 17)	(Hungarian Football Federation) Győr
13	FW	Máté Kiss	24 March 2009 (age 17)	(Hungarian Football Federation) Ferencváros
20	FW	Balázs Wiesner	28 February 2009 (age 17)	(Hungarian Football Federation) Paksi

=== Recent call-ups ===
The following players have previously been called up to the Hungary under-17 squad and remain eligible.

Pos.	Player	Date of birth (age)	Caps	Goals	Club	Latest call-up

== Coaching staff ==
Head coach	(Hungary) Gergő Jeremiás
Assistant coach	(Hungary)
Coaches	(Hungary) Gábor Hegedűs
Coaches	(Hungary) György Korolovszky
Coaches	(Hungary) László Szepessy
Coaches	(Hungary) Frigyes Tuboly
Goalkeeping coach	(Hungary) István Hámori
Team doctor	(Hungary) Sándor Mecseki, MD
Masseur	(Hungary) László Hegyesi
Technical manager	(Hungary) Béla Brünyi

== Head-to-head record ==
The following table shows Hungary's head-to-head record in the FIFA U-17 World Cup.

Opponent	Pld	W	D	L	GF	GA	GD	Win %
Australia	1	0	1	0	2	2	+0	0.00
Brazil	1	1	0	0	1	0	+1	100.00
Ecuador	1	0	0	1	2	3	−1	0.00
Mexico	1	0	1	0	0	0	+0	0.00
Nigeria	2	0	0	2	3	7	−4	0.00
Qatar	1	1	0	0	3	0	+3	100.00
Total	7	2	2	3	11	12	−1	28.57

== See also ==
- Hungary national football team
- Hungary national under-21 football team
- Hungary national under-19 football team
