= Trnavac =

Trnavac (Serbian: Трнавац) is a Serbo-Croatian place name and demonym, derived from trn ("thorn"), which may refer to:

Places

- Trnavac, Serbia, a village near Zaječar
- Trnavac, Croatia, a village near Plitvička Jezera

People

- Milutin Trnavac, Serbian footballer

== See also ==
- Trnava (disambiguation)
- Trnovac (disambiguation)
- Trnavci, a village in Serbia
