= Tarnava =

Tarnava may refer to:

- Tarnava, Vratsa Province, a village in Vratsa Province, Bulgaria
- Tarnava, Yambol Province, a village in Yambol Province, Bulgaria

== See also ==
- Târnava (disambiguation)
- Trnava (disambiguation)
