= Trava =

Trava may refer to

- Trava, Loški Potok, Slovenian village
- Trava: Fist Planet, an anime video
- Trava, medieval castle in Galicia, Spain
  - House of Trava, family named for the castle
- DJ Tráva (1965–2025), Czech DJ and electronic music producer
- Latin American slur or slang for travesti

== See also ==
- Trnava (disambiguation)
- Tranny (disambiguation)
