= Riccardo Cassano =

Riccardo Cassano may refer to:

- Riccardo Cassano (director) (1885-1953), Italian film director
- Riccardo Cassano (footballer) (born 2009), Italian footballer
