= Robin Thiland-Hérard =

French footballer (born 2008)

Personal information
- Date of birth: 10 January 2008 (age 18)
- Place of birth: Nîmes, France
- Height: 1.84 m (6 ft 0 in)
- Position: Striker

Team information
- Current team: Como U19

Youth career
- 2016–2017: Entente Saint-Jean-du-Grès
- 2017–2019: Arles
- 2019–2021: EFC Beaucairois
- 2021–2026: Montpellier
- 2026–: Como

Senior career*
| Years | Team | Apps | (Gls) |
| 2025–2026 | Montpellier B | 9 | (2) |
| 2026 | Montpellier | 1 | (0) |

International career^{‡}
| 2023–2024 | France U16 | 12 | (3) |
| 2025 | France U18 | 1 | (1) |
- * Club domestic league appearances and goals as of 21:25, 6 August 2026 (UTC) ‡ National team caps and goals as of 21:25, 6 August 2026 (UTC)

Robin Thiland-Hérard (born 10 January 2008) is a French professional footballer who plays as a striker for the under-19 team of Serie A club Como.

== Club career ==
Under Michel Rodriguez, Thiland-Hérard was Montpellier's leading under-19 scorer in the 2025–26 season, with 14 goals in the Championnat National U19 and 19 in all competitions, and scored in the Coupe Gambardella final against Paris Saint-Germain. He also made nine appearances and scored twice for the reserve side in the Championnat National 3. Training regularly with Zoumana Camara's first team, Thiland-Hérard made his senior debut for Montpellier in the Coupe de France round of 32 at Metz, coming on for the final 15 minutes of a 4–0 win, and later appeared in Ligue 2.

With his contract expiring on 30 June 2026, Thiland-Hérard turned down a trainee deal from Montpellier, announcing his departure from the club on social media. On 23 July 2026, he signed his first professional contract with Italian club Como, who had been linked with him the previous month. He was assigned to the club's Primavera side.

== International career ==
Thiland-Hérard has represented France at youth international level, winning the Montaigu Tournament in 2024.

== Honours ==
Montpellier U18

- Coupe Gambardella runner-up: 2025–26

France U16

- Montaigu Tournament: 2024
