= Daniele Buzzegoli =

Italian football player (born 1983)

Personal information
- Date of birth: 7 May 1983 (age 43)
- Place of birth: Florence, Italy
- Height: 1.79 m (5 ft 10 in)
- Position: Midfielder

Team information
- Current team: Como (youth coach)

Youth career
- Empoli

Senior career*
Years	Team	Apps	(Gls)
2001–2002	Empoli	0	(0)
2002–2003	Grosseto	9	(0)
2003–2005	Massese	55	(7)
2005–2006	Empoli	4	(0)
2007–2009	Pisa	15	(3)
2009	→ Gallipoli (loan)	10	(0)
2009–2011	Varese	37	(6)
2011–2012	Spezia	38	(4)
2012–2016	Novara	111	(10)
2016–2017	Benevento	29	(2)
2017–2018	Ascoli	37	(3)
2019–2021	Novara	70	(9)
2021–2022	San Donato Tavarnelle	31	(5)

Managerial career
- 2022–2023: San Donato Tavarnelle
- 2023: Novara
- 2024–: Como Primavera
- * Club domestic league appearances and goals

Daniele Buzzegoli (born 7 May 1983) is an Italia football coach and former player. He is the current Under-19 youth coach of Como.

== Playing career ==
He played two seasons (4 games, no goals) in the Serie A for Empoli.

In January 2011 Buzzegoli was signed by Spezia for €100,000.

On 4 July 2012 he was swapped with Filippo Porcari. Both players were tagged for €800,000 in the financial accounts.

On 7 January 2019 he returned to Novara on a 1.5-year contract.

== Coaching career ==
In June 2022, following a final season as a player with Serie D club San Donato Tavarnelle, and following the club's promotion to Serie C, Buzzegoli retired from active football to join the coaching staff of newly appointed manager Lamberto Magrini. On 14 November 2022, following Magrini's dismissal from his head coaching role, Buzzegoli was promoted as head coach on an interim basis. Under his tenure, San Donato Tavarnelle failed to escape relegation, leading Buzzegoli to depart by the end of the season.

On 8 July 2023, Novara announced they had appointed Buzzegoli as their new head coach. On 14 October 2023, following a negative start in the season, Novara announced the dismissal of Buzzegoli from his head coaching role.

In January 2024, he was appointed in charge of the Under-19 youth team of Como.

== Personal life ==
His grandfather Ivo Buzzegoli played in the Serie A in the 1940s.
