= João Gabriel (footballer, born 2007) =

Footballer (born 2007)

- João Gabriel in 2026

Personal information
- Full name: João Gabriel Leonardo Zaatar Maklouf
- Birth name: João Gabriel Cardozo Santos Maklouf
- Date of birth: 6 April 2007 (age 19)
- Place of birth: São Paulo, Brazil
- Height: 1.86 m (6 ft 1 in)
- Position: Centre-back

Team information
- Current team: Como U20
- Number: 4

Youth career
- 2014–2017: Santos
- 2018: Nacional-SP
- 2019: Audax
- 2020–2024: Corinthians
- 2023–2024: → Roma (loan)
- 2024–: Como

International career^{‡}
Years	Team	Apps	(Gls)
2026–	Lebanon U20	3	(0)
2026–	Lebanon	4	(0)
- ‡ National team caps and goals as of 17 November 2026

João Gabriel Leonardo Zaatar Maklouf (Note: In Lebanon his full name is João Gabriel Leonardo Zaatar Maklouf (Arabic: جواو غبريال ليوناردو زعتر مخلوف), while in Brazil his full name is João Gabriel Cardozo Santos Maklouf.) (born 6 April 2007), known as João Gabriel, (Note: Known in his club career as João Gabriel, he plays as João Gabriel Maklouf (Arabic: جواو غبريال مخلوف) at the national-team level.) is a footballer who plays as a centre-back for the under-20 team of Serie A club Como. Born in Brazil, he plays for the Lebanon national team.

== Early life ==
João Gabriel was born in São Paulo, Brazil, and is of Lebanese and Italian descent. His paternal grandfather emigrated from Lebanon to Brazil, and his father, Leonardo Maklouf, was born in Santos, São Paulo. His maternal great-great-grandfather was born in Italy.

== Club career ==
João Gabriel began playing football at the age of six at Santos. After four seasons, he joined Nacional-SP, playing at the under-11 level in 2018, before moving to Audax, where he played at the under-13 level in 2019. João Gabriel joined Corinthians ahead of the 2020 season. His first year was affected by the COVID-19 pandemic, during which the under-13 championship was not contested. He subsequently progressed through the under-15 and under-17 sides.

In August 2023, João Gabriel joined Roma on loan from Corinthians. He initially played for the under-18 side and was subsequently involved with the Primavera (under-19) team. He also trained with Roma's first team under managers José Mourinho and Daniele De Rossi. Following the loan, he left Corinthians after four and a half years with the club.

João Gabriel joined Como in September 2024 and became part of the club's Primavera (under-20) side, competing in the Campionato Primavera 2. He also trained with the first team under manager Cesc Fàbregas. In July 2025, Como extended his contract until July 2028. He made 27 appearances during the 2025–26 season, helping Como win Group A and secure promotion to the Campionato Primavera 1. João Gabriel competed in the 2026–27 UEFA Youth League for Como.

== International career ==
João Gabriel is eligible to represent Brazil, Italy, and Lebanon. He holds Lebanese citizenship through his paternal grandfather, and obtained Italian citizenship through his maternal great-great-grandfather in August 2023, shortly before moving to Italy. By June 2025, the Italian Football Federation had shown interest in João Gabriel, with scouts attending his matches.

In March 2026, João Gabriel was called up to the Lebanon under-20 national team for the 2026 WAFF U-20 Championship. However, the tournament was postponed. He made his under-20 debut in August 2026, as a half-time substitute in a 2–2 friendly draw with Tajikistan. João Gabriel played both games in the 2027 AFC U-20 Asian Cup qualifiers, helping Lebanon qualify for the final tournament.

João Gabriel received his first call-up to the Lebanon national team from head coach Madjid Bougherra in September 2026, ahead of friendly matches against the Maldives and Kyrgyzstan in October. He made his debut on 1 October, starting in a 6–0 win against the Maldives.

== Style of play ==
At 1.86 m (6 ft 1 in) tall, João Gabriel primarily plays as a centre-back and has also been deployed at right-back. At Como, he has been developed in a system based on a high defensive line, pressing and attempts to regain possession immediately after losing the ball.

== Personal life ==
João Gabriel speaks Portuguese, English, Spanish, and Italian. He studied Italian before moving to Italy in 2023. He has practiced kung fu since the age of six, and has competed at state and national level in Brazil, attaining a brown belt.

== Career statistics ==
=== International ===
As of match played 17 November 2026

Appearances and goals by national team and year
National team	Year	Apps	Goals
Lebanon	2026	4	0
Total		4	0

== Honours ==
Como

- Campionato Primavera 2: 2025–26 (Group A)

== See also ==
- List of Lebanon international footballers born outside Lebanon
