= Trnovac =

Trnovac may refer to:

- Trnovac, Novi Travnik, a village in Bosnia and Herzegovina
- Trnovac, Serbia, a village near Knjaževac
- Trnovac, Lika-Senj County, a village near Gospić, Croatia
- Trnovac, Požega-Slavonia County, a village near Velika, Croatia
- Trnovac, North Macedonia, a village near Kratovo
- Trnovac (Vrbanja), a river in Central Bosnia, a tributary of the Vrbanja

== See also ==
- Trnavac (disambiguation)
