= Álex Valle =

Spanish footballer (born 2004)

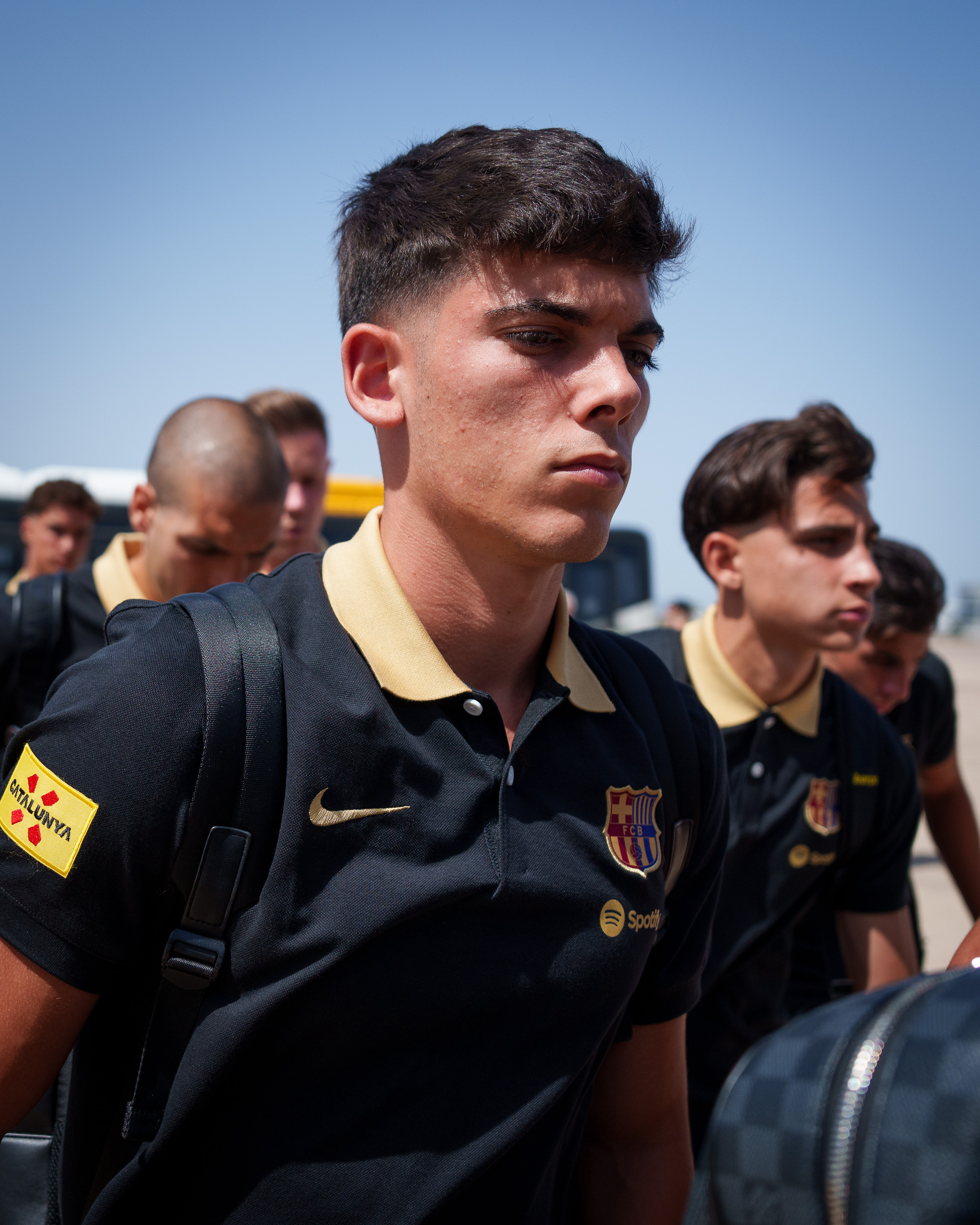
- Valle with Barcelona in 2024

Personal information
- Full name: Álex Valle Gómez
- Date of birth: 25 April 2004 (age 22)
- Place of birth: Badalona, Spain
- Height: 1.78 m (5 ft 10 in)
- Position: Left-back

Team information
- Current team: Como
- Number: 3

Youth career
- Gramenet
- Sant Gabriel
- 2014–2022: Barcelona

Senior career*
Years	Team	Apps	(Gls)
2022–2025	Barcelona B	22	(0)
2023	→ Andorra (loan)	7	(0)
2023–2024	→ Levante (loan)	29	(0)
2024–2025	→ Celtic (loan)	11	(0)
2025	→ Como (loan)	15	(0)
2025–	Como	37	(1)

International career^{‡}
2021–2022	Spain U18	4	(1)
2022–2023	Spain U19	13	(1)
2022	Spain U20	1	(0)
2025–	Spain U21	7	(0)
- * Club domestic league appearances and goals as of 18:37, 21 November 2026 (UTC) ‡ National team caps and goals as of 31 March 2026

Álex Valle Gómez (born 25 April 2004) is a Spanish professional footballer who plays as a left-back for Serie A club Como.

== Club career ==
=== Barcelona ===
Born in Badalona, Barcelona, Catalonia, Valle joined Barcelona's La Masia in 2014, from Sant Gabriel. He made his senior debut with the reserves on 19 March 2022, starting in a 2–1 Primera División RFEF home win over Cornellà.

On 1 November 2022, Valle was named amongst the substitutes in Barcelona's UEFA Champions League match against Viktoria Plzeň; he remained unused in the 4–2 away win.

==== Loan to Andorra ====
On 31 January 2023, Valle renewed his contract with Barcelona until 2025, and was immediately loaned to Segunda División side Andorra for the remainder of the season. He made his professional debut on 3 March, replacing Jacobo González in a 0–0 home draw against Las Palmas.

==== Loan to Levante ====
On 14 August 2023, Valle was loaned to fellow second division Levante for the 2023–24 season.

==== Loan to Celtic ====
On 28 August 2024, Valle extended his contract with Barça until 2026, and was loaned to Celtic for one year. He found it hard to get consistent game time, with Greg Taylor being preferred ahead of him.

=== Como ===
On 31 January 2025, Valle moved on a new loan to Como in Italy. On 3 June, Barcelona announced that Como exercised his buyout clause, with the transfer fee set on € 6 million.

== Career statistics ==
=== Club ===
As of match played 21 November 2026

Appearances and goals by club, season and competition
Club	Season	League			Cup		Europe		Other		Total	
Club	Season	Division	Apps	Goals	Apps	Goals	Apps	Goals	Apps	Goals	Apps	Goals
Barcelona B	2021–22	Primera División RFEF	3	0	—		—		—		3	0
Barcelona B	2022–23	Primera Federación	19	0	—		—		—		19	0
Barcelona B	Total		22	0	—		—		—		22	0
Andorra (loan)	2022–23	Segunda División	7	0	—		—		—		7	0
Levante (loan)	2023–24	Segunda División	29	0	0	0	—		—		29	0
Celtic (loan)	2024–25	Scottish Premiership	11	0	0	0	5 (Note: Appearances in UEFA Champions League)	0	3 (Note: Appearances in Scottish League Cup)	0	19	0
Como (loan)	2024–25	Serie A	15	0	—		—		—		15	0
Como	2025–26	Serie A	28	1	3	0	—		—		31	1
Como	2026–27	Serie A	9	0	0	0	4	0	—		13	0
Como	Como total		52	1	3	0	4	0	—		59	1
Career total			121	1	3	0	9	0	3	0	136	1

== Honours ==
Celtic

- Scottish League Cup: 2024–25

Individual

- UEFA European Under-19 Championship Team of the Tournament: 2023
