= Jesús Rodríguez (footballer, born 2005) =

Spanish footballer (born 2005)

Personal information
- Full name: Jesús Rodríguez Caraballo
- Date of birth: 21 November 2005 (age 20)
- Place of birth: Alcalá de Guadaíra, Spain
- Height: 1.85 m (6 ft 1 in)
- Position: Left winger

Team information
- Current team: Como
- Number: 17

Youth career
- 2019–2021: Nervión
- 2021–2022: Betis
- 2022–2023: Calavera
- 2023–2024: Betis

Senior career*
| Years | Team | Apps | (Gls) |
| 2023–2024 | Betis B | 36 | (9) |
| 2024–2025 | Betis | 21 | (2) |
| 2025– | Como | 32 | (2) |

International career^{‡}
| 2024 | Spain U19 | 6 | (0) |
| 2025– | Spain U21 | 8 | (2) |
| 2025– | Spain | 2 | (0) |
Medal record
Men's football
Representing Spain
UEFA European Under-19 Championship
| Winner | 2024 Northern Ireland |
- * Club domestic league appearances and goals as of 09:00, 27 August 2026 (UTC) ‡ National team caps and goals as of 21:45, 4 June 2026 (UTC)

Jesús Rodríguez Caraballo (born 21 November 2005) is a Spanish professional footballer who plays as a left winger for Serie A club Como and the Spain national team.

== Club career ==
=== Betis ===
Rodríguez is a youth product of Nervión. In 2021, he joined the youth academy of La Liga club Real Betis, being described as "one of the main pillars of the Betis youth team" while playing for the club. In 2022, Rodríguez joined the youth academy of Calavera and later returned to Betis. Rodríguez made his first team debut on 31 October 2024 in a 6–1 Copa del Rey victory against Gévora. He also played for the reserve team in Primera Federación in that season. He reached the 2024–25 UEFA Conference League final with the Verdiblancos, taking part in the match and later becoming the runner-up of the competition after they lost 4–1 against Chelsea.

=== Como ===
After only one season in the top tier with Betis' first team, Rodríguez signed for the Italian club Como permanently until June 2030. On 24 September 2025, he scored his first goals for the club by netting a brace in a 3–0 win over Sassuolo in the Coppa Italia. He netted his first Serie A goal and provided an assist in a 3–1 win over Lecce on 28 February 2026.

== International career ==
A Spain youth international, Rodríguez played for the Spain U19 and was part of the team that won the 2024 UEFA European Under-19 Championship in Northern Ireland. He later received his first call-up to the Spain U21 team in March 2025 by manager Santi Denia, coming on as a substitute in the 45th minute of a friendly match against the Czech Republic.

Rodríguez also played at the 2025 UEFA European Under-21 Championship in Slovakia, being the youngest player in the team. He scored his first goal for Spain U21 in a Group A match against Italy that ended in a 1–1 draw.

Rodríguez was called up to the senior Spain national team for 2026 FIFA World Cup qualification matches in September 2025. He made his senior debut at the age of 19, coming on as a substitute in the 79th minute of Spain's 3–0 victory against Bulgaria, replacing Lamine Yamal.

== Style of play ==
Rodríguez is a winger known for his speed, pace, balance, and technical proficiency. He has drawn early comparisons to Real Betis legend Joaquín due to his role and impact on the flanks.

Despite being naturally right-footed, Rodríguez is capable of operating effectively on either flank. Apart from his attacking output, Rodríguez contributes significantly on the defensive end and maintains a consistent success rate in defensive duels. His all-round profile suggests the potential to develop into a high-level winger.

== Career statistics ==
=== Club ===
As of match played 22 August 2026

Appearances and goals by club, season and competition
| Club | Season | League | | | National cup (Note: Includes Copa del Rey, Coppa Italia) | | Europe | | Other | | Total | |
| Club | Season | Division | Apps | Goals | Apps | Goals | Apps | Goals | Apps | Goals | Apps | Goals |
|---|---|---|---|---|---|---|---|---|---|---|---|---|
| Betis Deportivo | 2023–24 | Segunda Federación | 24 | 7 | — | | — | | — | | 24 | 7 |
| Betis Deportivo | 2024–25 | Primera Federación | 12 | 2 | — | | — | | — | | 12 | 2 |
| Betis Deportivo | Total | | 36 | 9 | — | | — | | — | | 36 | 9 |
| Real Betis | 2024–25 | La Liga | 21 | 2 | 3 | 0 | 8 (Note: Appearances in UEFA Conference League) | 1 | — | | 32 | 3 |
| Como | 2025–26 | Serie A | 31 | 2 | 5 | 2 | — | | — | | 36 | 4 |
| Como | 2026–27 | Serie A | 1 | 0 | 0 | 0 | — | | — | | 1 | 0 |
| Como | Total | | 32 | 2 | 5 | 2 | 0 | 0 | 0 | 0 | 37 | 4 |
| Career total | | | 99 | 13 | 8 | 2 | 8 | 1 | 0 | 0 | 105 | 16 |

=== International ===
As of match played 4 June 2026

Appearances and goals by national team and year
| National team | Year | Apps | Goals |
|---|---|---|---|
| Spain | 2025 | 1 | 0 |
| Spain | 2026 | 1 | 0 |
| Total | | 2 | 0 |

== Honours ==
Betis

- UEFA Conference League runner-up: 2024–25

Spain U19

- UEFA European Under-19 Championship: 2024
