= Târnăvița =

Târnăviţa may refer to several places in Romania:

- Târnăvița, a village in Hălmăgel Commune, Arad County
- Târnăvița, a village in Brănișca Commune, Hunedoara County

== See also ==
- Târnava (disambiguation)
