= Jayden Addai =

Dutch footballer (born 2005)

Personal information
- Full name: Jayden Osei Addai
- Date of birth: 26 August 2005 (age 21)
- Place of birth: Purmerend, Netherlands
- Height: 1.75 m (5 ft 9 in)
- Position: Right winger

Team information
- Current team: Como
- Number: 42

Youth career
- Purmersteijn
- 2016–2022: AZ

Senior career*
| Years | Team | Apps | (Gls) |
| 2022–2025 | Jong AZ | 51 | (18) |
| 2023–2025 | AZ | 25 | (1) |
| 2025– | Como | 12 | (3) |

International career^{‡}
| 2024 | Netherlands U19 | 3 | (0) |
| 2025– | Netherlands U21 | 3 | (1) |
- * Club domestic league appearances and goals as of 08:10, 10 May 2026 (UTC) ‡ National team caps and goals as of 23:55, 18 November 2025 (UTC)

Jayden Osei Addai (born 26 August 2005) is a Dutch footballer who plays as a right winger for Serie A club Como.

== Club career ==
=== AZ ===
Addai began his career with Jong AZ, where he played a key role in winning the 2022–23 UEFA Youth League, notably scoring a penalty in the 5–0 victory over Hajduk Split in the final. He made his Eredivisie debut for AZ on November 26, 2023, in a home match against Volendam. He went on to score his first Eredivisie goal in a 3–0 away win over Go Ahead Eagles on 4 May 2025.

=== Como ===
On 4 July 2025, Addai joined Serie A side Como for reported fee of €14 million, signing a five-year contract. His first goal for the club was a 94th minute game-winner in a 1–2 victory away at Fiorentina on 21 September 2025.

== International career ==
Addai was first called up to the Netherlands U19 squad on 1 March 2024. He made his debut shortly after on 26 March 2024, as a 53rd-minute substitute in a 3–2 loss to Belgium in a UEFA U19 Championship Qualification match.

== Personal life ==
Addai was born in the Dutch city of Purmerend, and is of Ghanaian descent.

== Career statistics ==
=== Club ===
As of match played 24 May 2026

Appearances and goals by club, season and competition
| Club | Season | League | | | Cup | | Continental | | Other | | Total | |
| Club | Season | Division | Apps | Goals | Apps | Goals | Apps | Goals | Apps | Goals | Apps | Goals |
|---|---|---|---|---|---|---|---|---|---|---|---|---|
| Jong AZ | 2021–22 | Eerste Divisie | 4 | 0 | – | | – | | – | | 4 | 0 |
| Jong AZ | 2022–23 | Eerste Divisie | 16 | 0 | – | | – | | – | | 16 | 0 |
| Jong AZ | 2023–24 | Eerste Divisie | 19 | 10 | – | | – | | – | | 19 | 10 |
| Jong AZ | 2024–25 | Eerste Divisie | 4 | 5 | – | | – | | – | | 4 | 5 |
| Jong AZ | Total | | 43 | 15 | – | | – | | – | | 43 | 15 |
| AZ | 2023–24 | Eredivisie | 8 | 0 | 2 | 0 | 2 (Note: Appearances in UEFA Conference League) | 0 | 0 | 0 | 12 | 0 |
| AZ | 2024–25 | Eredivisie | 16 | 1 | 3 | 1 | 4 (Note: Appearances in UEFA Europa League) | 0 | 0 | 0 | 24 | 2 |
| AZ | Total | | 25 | 1 | 5 | 1 | 6 | 0 | 0 | 0 | 36 | 2 |
| Como | 2025–26 | Serie A | 12 | 3 | 4 | 0 | — | | — | | 16 | 3 |
| Career total | | | 80 | 19 | 9 | 1 | 6 | 0 | 0 | 0 | 95 | 20 |
