= Francesco Andrealli =

Peruvian footballer (born 2007)

Personal information
- Full name: Francesco Luis Andrealli
- Date of birth: 5 August 2007 (age 19)
- Place of birth: Italy
- Height: 1.79 m (5 ft 10 in)
- Positions: Defender; midfielder

Team information
- Current team: Como
- Number: 51

Youth career
- Como

Senior career*
Years	Team	Apps	(Gls)
2024–	Como	0	(0)

International career^{‡}
2025–	Peru U18	3	(0)
- * Club domestic league appearances and goals ‡ National team caps and goals as of 8 October 2025

Francesco Luis Andrealli (born 5 August 2007) is a professional footballer who plays as a defender or midfielder for Como. Born in Italy, he is a Peru youth international.

== Early life ==
Andrealli was born in Italy, to a Peruvian mother and an Italian father.

== Club career ==
As a youth player, Andrealli joined the academy of Italian side Como. In 2024, he was promoted to the club's senior team.

== International career ==
Andrealli is a Peru youth international. On 3 September 2025, he made his debut for the Peru U18 during a 0–0 home friendly draw with Guatemala.

He was one of the players who were called up with the Peru national team by head coach Mano Menezes for the friendly match against Bolivia on 13 November 2026.

== Style of play ==
Andrealli plays as a defender or midfielder and is right-footed. Peruvian newspaper El Comercio wrote in 2025 that he "can play as a central defender or defensive midfielder, standing out for his solidity in defensive actions and his ability to win back possession".
