= Gornja Trnava =

Gornja Trnava may refer to:

- Gornja Trnava (Topola), a village near Topola, Serbia
- Gornja Trnava (Niš), a village near Niš, Serbia
- Gornja Trnava (Prokuplje), a village near Prokuplje, Serbia
