= Turnovo =

Turnovo may refer to:

- Veliko Tarnovo, a city in Bulgaria
- Malko Tarnovo, a town in Bulgaria
- Turnovo, North Macedonia, a village in North Macedonia
- Turnovo, Republic of Bashkortostan, a rural locality in Russia
- Turnovo, Croatia, a village near Desinić

== See also ==
- Trnovo (disambiguation)
- Târnova (disambiguation)
