= Tranny (disambiguation) =

Tranny is a derogatory term for a trans person.

Tranny or trannie may also refer to:

== Technology ==
- Transformer, an electrical device
- Transistor radio, a small portable radio receiver using transistor-based circuitry
- Transmission (mechanics), a component of a motor vehicle
- Ford Transit, a range of Ford panel vans, minibuses, and pickup trucks
- Photographic transparency, made using reversal film

== Other uses ==
- Middlesbrough Transporter Bridge, a bridge across the River Tees, England
- Transition, the rounded section of the sidewall of a half-pipe used for skating, skiing, snowboarding, telemarking
- Tranny: Confessions of Punk Rock's Most Infamous Anarchist Sellout, a 2016 book by Laura Jane Grace
- Tranny Lee Gaddy (1894–1975), American football player and coach
- Vert skateboarding, sometimes called tranny, short for transitional skateboarding
