= Trnavci =

Coordinates: 43°25′N 21°07′E

- Village
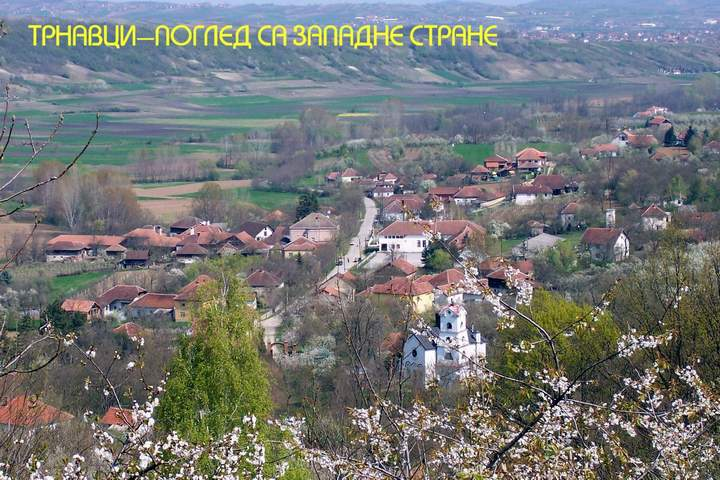
- Trnava-Panorama
- Interactive map of Trnavci
- Country: Serbia
- District: Rasinski
- Municipality: Aleksandrovac

Population (2002)
  - Total: 494
- Time zone: UTC+1 (CET)
  - Summer (DST): UTC+2 (CEST)

Trnavci (Serbian Cyrillic: Трнавци) is a village in the municipality of Aleksandrovac, in the Rasina District, Serbia. According to the 2002 census, the village has a population of 494 people.

== See also ==
- List of populated places in Serbia
