= Trnava (Užice) =

Coordinates: 43°50′58″N 19°45′23″E

- Village
- Interactive map of Trnava
- Country: Serbia
- Region: Šumadija and Western Serbia
- District: Zlatibor District
- Municipality: Užice

Population (2011)
  - Total: 378
- Time zone: UTC+1 (CET)
  - Summer (DST): UTC+2 (CEST)

Trnava (Serbian Cyrillic: Трнава) is a village located in the Užice municipality of Serbia.
