= Trnovo, Šekovići =

Trnovo
- Village
- Location within Bosnia and Herzegovina
- Coordinates: 44.2536806°N 18.7806557°E
- Country: Bosnia and Herzegovina
- Entity: Republika Srpska; Federation of Bosnia and Herzegovina
- Region Canton: Bijeljina; Tuzla
- Municipality: Šekovići; Kladanj

Area
  - Total: 4.83 sq mi (12.51 km^{2})
- Elevation: 2,030 ft (620 m)

Population (2013)
  - Total: 202
  - Density: 41.8/sq mi (16.1/km^{2})

Trnovo is a village in the municipalities of Šekovići (Republika Srpska) and Kladanj, Bosnia and Herzegovina.

== Demographics ==
According to the 2013 census, its population was 202, all Serbs living in the Šekovići part.
