= Trnava (Raška) =

Trnava Трнава
- Village (Selo)
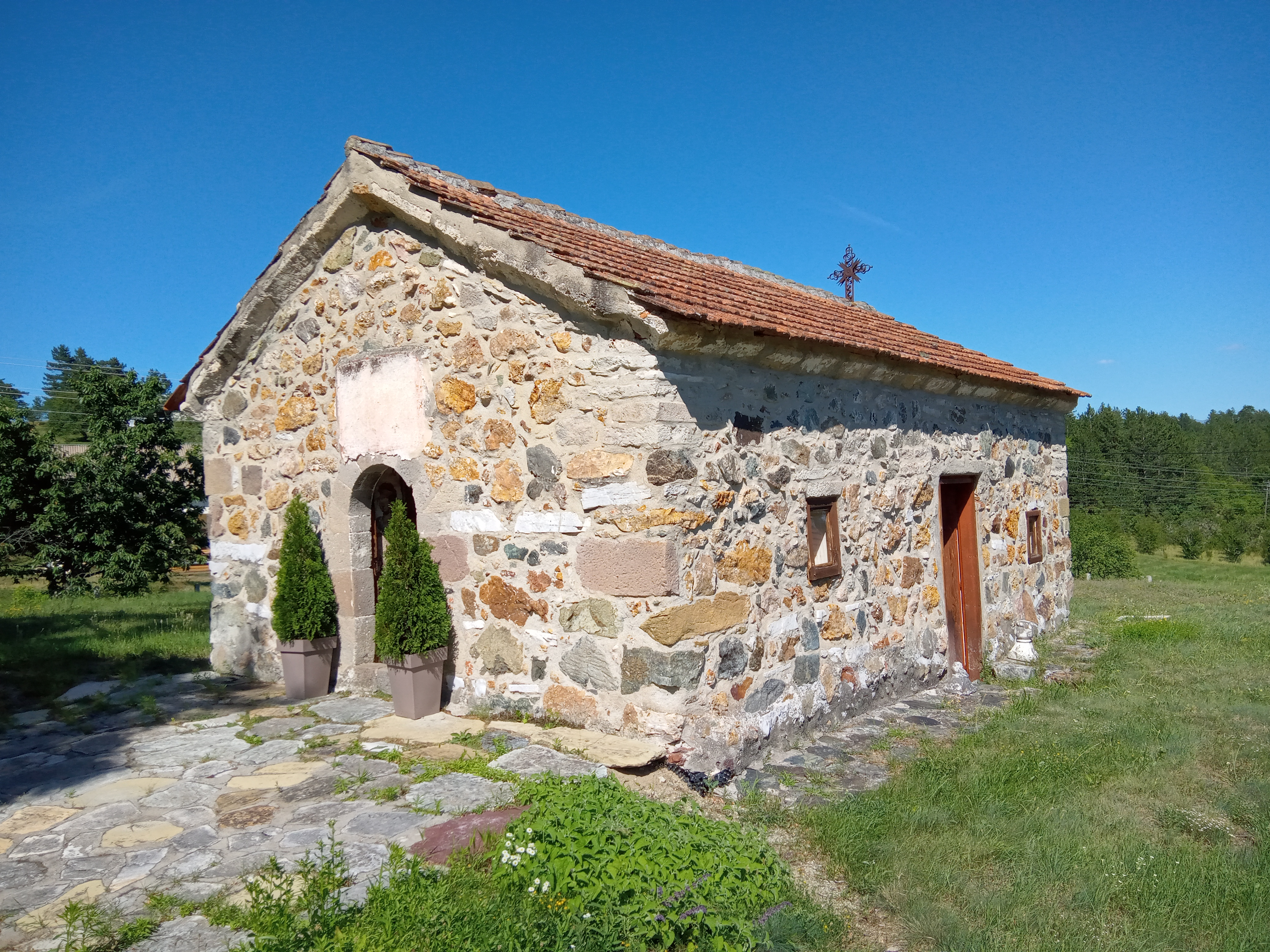
- Trnava Church

- Location within Serbia
- Coordinates: 43°17′N 20°31′E
- Country: Serbia
- District: Raška District
- Municipality: Raška

Population (2011)
  - Total: 219
- Time zone: UTC+1 (CET)
  - Summer (DST): UTC+2 (CEST)

Trnava (Serbian Cyrillic: Трнава, romanized: Trnava) is a village in the municipality of Raška, Serbia. According to the 2011 census, the village has a population of 219 people.
