= Turnovo, Republic of Bashkortostan =

Turnovo Турново
- Village
- Location within Bashkortostan Location within Russia
- Coordinates: 55°42′N 56°29′E
- Country: Russia
- Region: Bashkortostan
- District: Karaidelsky District
- Time zone: UTC+5:00

Turnovo (Russian: Турново; Bashkir: Торна, Torna) is a rural locality (a village) in Urgushevsky Selsoviet, Karaidelsky District, Bashkortostan, Russia. The population was 77 as of 2010. There are six streets.

== Geography ==
Turnovo is located 40 km southwest of Karaidel, the district's administrative centre, by road. Nikolo-Kazanka and Suleymanovo are the nearest rural localities.
