= Trnová (Prague-West District) =

- Municipality
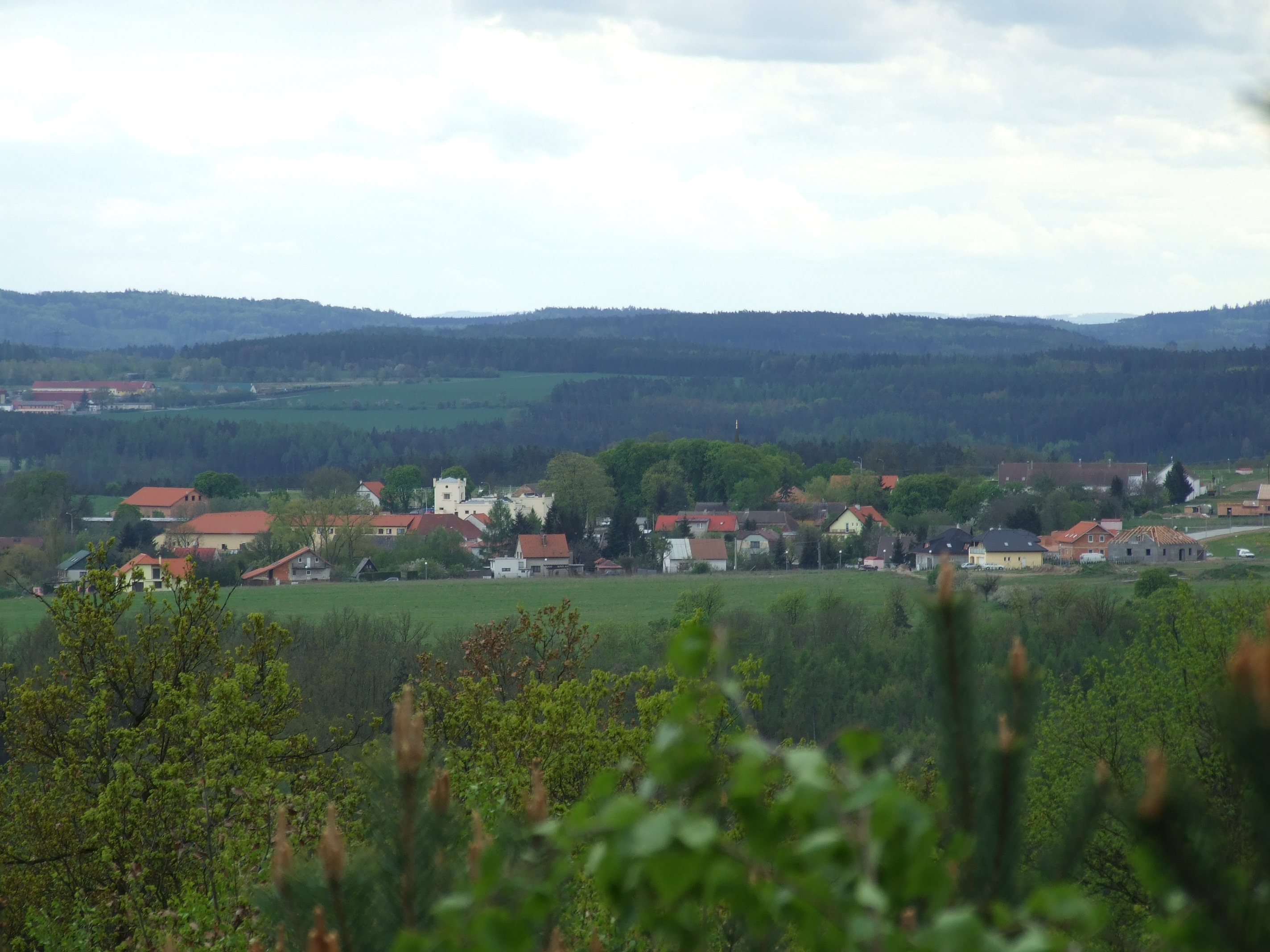
- General view

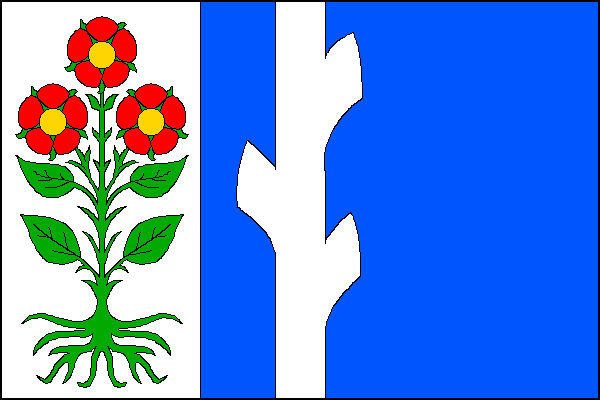
- Flag Coat of arms

- Location in the Czech Republic
- Coordinates: 49°54′56″N 14°21′28″E
- Country: Czech Republic
- Region: Central Bohemian
- District: Prague-West
- Founded: 1342

Area
  - Total: 4.26 km^{2} (1.64 sq mi)
- Elevation: 340 m (1,120 ft)

Population (2026-01-01)
  - Total: 622
  - Density: 146/km^{2} (378/sq mi)
- Time zone: UTC+1 (CET)
  - Summer (DST): UTC+2 (CEST)
- Postal code: 252 10
- Website: www.obectrnova.cz

Trnová is a municipality and village in Prague-West District in the Central Bohemian Region of the Czech Republic. It has about 600 inhabitants.

== Etymology ==
The Czech adjective trnová (i.e. 'thorny') referred to a hillside where there were many thorny bushes.

== Geography ==
Trnová is located about 12 kilometres (7 mi) south of Prague. It lies in the Benešov Uplands. The municipality is situated on the left shore of the Vrané Reservoir, built on the Vltava river.

== History ==
Trnová was founded in 1342 by the Lords of Kosoř on the land belonging to the Břevnov Monastery.

== Demographics ==
Historical population

Year	Pop.	±%
1869	253	—
1880	233	−7.9%
1890	230	−1.3%
1900	201	−12.6%
1910	191	−5.0%

Year	Pop.	±%
1921	184	−3.7%
1930	216	+17.4%
1950	192	−11.1%
1961	91	−52.6%
1970	91	+0.0%

Year	Pop.	±%
1980	110	+20.9%
1991	96	−12.7%
2001	107	+11.5%
2011	330	+208.4%
2021	611	+85.2%

Source: Censuses

== Transport ==
The railway line Prague–Dobříš briefly crosses the municipal territory, but there is no train station. The municipality is served by the station in neighbouring Měchenice.

== Sights ==
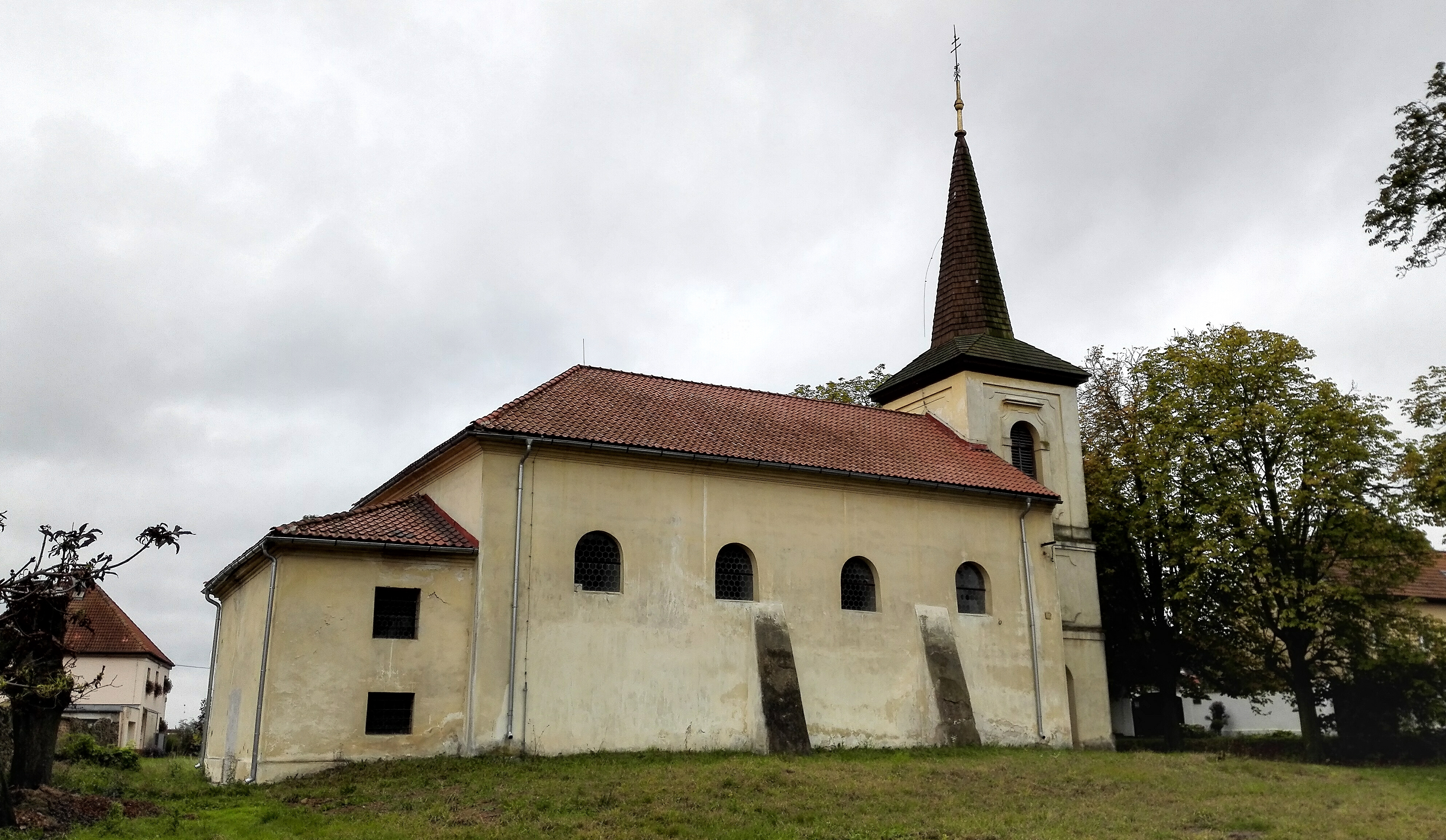
Church of the Holy Spirit

The Church of the Holy Spirit dates from the 14th century. It has minor Baroque modifications.

The Trnová Castle was originally a Baroque building, rebuilt and extended in the Neoclassical style at the turn of the 18th and 19th centuries. In 1860–1864, it was rebuilt into its present form, loosely inspired by English Gothic architecture. Today it is privately owned and used as a hotel.
