= Riccardo Cassano (footballer) =

Italian footballer (born 2009)

Personal information
- Date of birth: 18 March 2009 (age 17)
- Place of birth: Italy
- Position: Midfielder

Team information
- Current team: Como
- Number: 49

Youth career
- Como

Senior career*
Years	Team	Apps	(Gls)
2026–	Como	0	(0)

International career^{‡}
2026–	Italy U18	2	(0)
- * Club domestic league appearances and goals ‡ National team caps and goals as of 5 October 2026

Riccardo Cassano (born 18 March 2009) is an Italian footballer who plays as a midfielder for Serie A club Como.

== Early life ==
Cassano was born on 18 March 2009 and is the son of Stefano. Born in Italy, he is a native of Como, Italy.

== Club career ==
As a youth player, Cassano joined the youth academy of Como, where he played in the UEFA Youth League. During the summer of 2025, he was promoted to the club's under-17 team.

On 17 May 2026, he was first called up to their senior team during a 1–0 home win over Parma in the league. Ahead of the 2026–27 season, he was promoted to the Biancoblù under-21 team.

== International career ==
Cassano is an Italy youth international and has represented the country internationally at under-18 level. On 29 September 2026, he debuted for the Italy national under-18 football team during a 3–1 away friendly win over the Denmark national under-18 football team.

He was one of the players who were called up with the Italy national team by head coach Roberto Mancini for the 2026–27 UEFA Nations League matches against France and Belgium on 12 and 15 November 2026, respectively. Cassano was one of the players who were called up with the Italy U17s on 11 November 2026, by head coach Daniele Franceschini for the 2026 FIFA U-17 World Cup in Qatar.

== Style of play ==
Cassano plays as a midfielder. Right-footed, he has received comparisons to Spain international Sergio Busquets and Italy international Andrea Pirlo.

Italian news website Goal wrote in 2026 that he is "a classic playmaker, a playmaker who plays in front of the defense... a delicate foot, vision, and ability to organize play, along with excellent positioning and the ability to simplify play, are the qualities that attracted... attention. He also makes a significant contribution when breaking up the opposition's play".
