= Como 1907 Youth Sector =

Italian football club

Como Primavera
- Nicknames: I Lariani (Those from Lake Como); I Biancoblù (The Blue and Whites); I Voltiani (The Voltaics)
- Ground: Campo Sportivo comunale Mario Porta - Lo Scoiattolo
- Head coach: Daniele Buzzegoli
- League: Campionato Primavera 1
- 2025–26: Campionato Primavera 2 – A, 1st (promoted)
- Website: comofootball.com
Home colours	Away colours

Como 1907 Youth Sector (Italian: Como 1907 Settore Giovanile) is the youth system of Italian football club Como. The Youth Sector is made up of various squads divided by age groups. Since Cesc Fàbregas took over as head coach of the senior team, Osian Roberts has taken over as Head of Development in charge of creating the Como culture within the organisation including coach education and player development plans.

The Youth Sector is divided into 3 squads: "Primavera" (under-20), "Allievi" (under-17), under-16 and under-15.

== Primavera (under-20) ==
=== Current squad ===
As of 22 August 2026.
Shirt numbers refer to Primavera matches. Different numbers may be assigned to players who take part in first-team matches.

Note: Flags indicate national team as defined under FIFA eligibility rules; some limited exceptions apply. Players may hold more than one non-FIFA nationality.

No.	Pos.	Nation	Player
1	GK	ITA	Mattia Damioli (on loan from Union Brescia)
2	DF	GUI	Almamy Soumah
4	DF	LBN	João Gabriel
5	MF	ITA	Alessio Baralla
6	DF	ITA	Federico Grilli
7	MF	ITA	Mattia Turella
8	MF	PER	Francesco Andrealli
9	FW	FRA	Robin Thiland-Hérard
10	MF	ITA	Cristian Mazzara
11	MF	ITA	Lorenzo Bonsignori
13	MF	HUN	Levente Bősze
14	MF	ITA	Achille Tigano
15	DF	ITA	Edoardo Franzosi
17	MF	ITA	Italo Bulgheroni
18	MF	ITA	Ettore Broggian
19	FW	ITA	Kevin Fustini
21	MF	ITA	Matteo Papaccioli
22	MF	ROU	Sebastian Burlacu
23	DF	ITA	Cristiano De Paoli
24	GK	ITA	Lorenzo Luigi Ginelli
25	DF	ITA	Fabio Ronchetti
26	DF	FRA	Adam Asfour

No.	Pos.	Nation	Player
27	FW	ITA	Samuele Pisati
29	MF	ITA	Stefano Arui
33	GK	ITA	Nicolò Bensi
41	FW	ITA	Leonardo Casati
42	GK	SUI	Dylan Sgarbi
45	DF	ITA	Lorenzo Epifani
46	DF	ITA	Matteo Zanaria
49	MF	ITA	Riccardo Cassano
51	FW	ITA	Mattia Terranova
66	DF	BRA	Lorenzo De Paula
70	MF	ITA	Andrea Ballone
73	DF	ITA	Matteo Albini
74	DF	ITA	Mattia Arioli
77	MF	ITA	Thomas Boccia
78	FW	ITA	Francesco Lembo
79	FW	ESP	Diego Martínez
90	MF	ITA	Davide Zamagni
—	MF	ITA	Michael La Monaca
—	MF	POR	Miguel Silva
—	FW	IRL	Josh Harpur
—	FW	SWE	Zebedee Kennedy

== Under-17 ==
=== Current squad ===
As of 27 July 2026.

Note: Flags indicate national team as defined under FIFA eligibility rules; some limited exceptions apply. Players may hold more than one non-FIFA nationality.

No.	Pos.	Nation	Player
—	DF	ITA	Tommaso Meda
—	DF	ALB	Denis Nikolli
—	DF	ITA	Angelo Pisani
—	DF	ITA	Tommaso Vernile
—	MF	ITA	Riccardo Battista
—	MF	ITA	Filippo Briccola

No.	Pos.	Nation	Player
—	MF	BRA	Giovanni Di Julio Lopes
—	MF	ITA	Gabriele Gardanini
—	MF	ITA	Manuel Ortelli
—	FW	ITA	Achille Cauli
—	FW	ITA	Matteo Manfredini

== Honours ==
=== Primavera ===
- Campionato Primavera 2
  - Winners: 1962–63, 2025–26
- Trofeo Dossena
  - Winners: 1986, 1988

=== Other teams ===
- Campionato Berretti
  - Winners: 1978–79
- Campionato Nazionale Under-17 Serie C: 3
  - Winners: 1967–68, 2016–17, 2020–21
- Supercoppa Under-17
  - Runners-up: 2017
