= Donja Trnava =

Donja Trnava may refer to:

- Donja Trnava (Topola), a village near Topola, Serbia (pop. 771)
- Donja Trnava (Niš), a village near Niš, Serbia (pop. 630)
- Donja Trnava (Prokuplje), a village near Prokuplje, Serbia (pop. 1392)
