= Trnovo, Gostivar =

Trnovo Трново Tërnovë
- Village
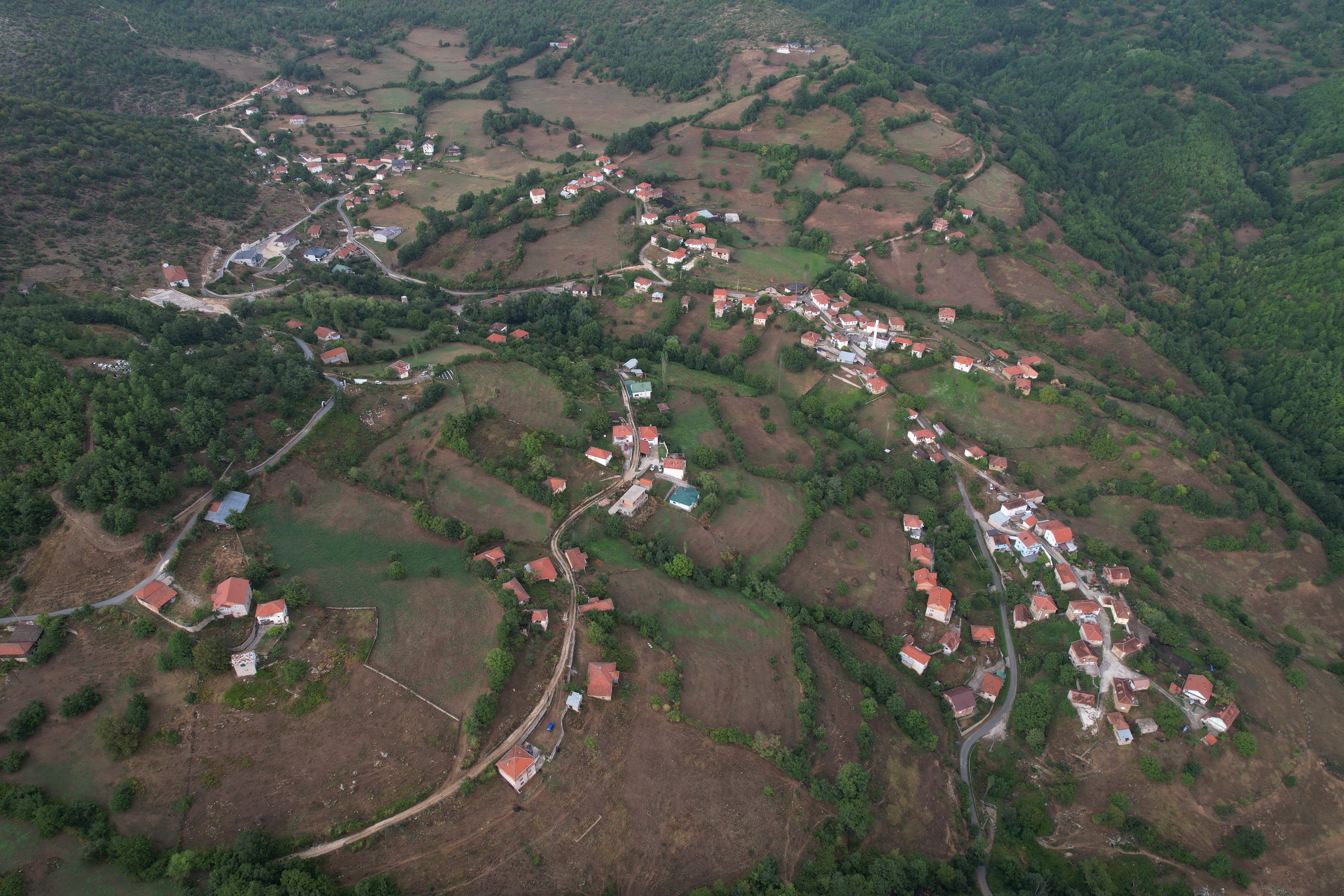
- Airview of the village Trnovo

- Location within North Macedonia
- Coordinates: 41°44′13″N 20°59′09″E
- Country: North Macedonia
- Region: Polog
- Municipality: Gostivar

Population (2021)
  - Total: 137
- Time zone: UTC+1 (CET)
  - Summer (DST): UTC+2 (CEST)
- Car plates: GV
- Website: .

Trnovo (Macedonian: Трново, Albanian: Tërnovë) is a village in the municipality of Gostivar, North Macedonia.

== Demographics ==
As of the 2021 census, Trnovo had 137 residents with the following ethnic composition:

- Albanians 112
- Persons for whom data are taken from administrative sources 21
- Others 4

According to the 2002 census, the village had a total of 539 inhabitants. Ethnic groups in the village include:

- Albanians 539

According to the 1942 Albanian census, Trnovo was inhabited by 888 Muslim Albanians.

The village is attested in the 1467/68 Ottoman tax registry (defter) for the Nahiyah of Kırçova. The village had a total of 16 houses, excluding bachelors (mucerred).
