= Levente Bősze =

Hungarian footballer (born 2009)

Personal information
- Date of birth: 18 February 2009 (age 17)
- Place of birth: Győr, Hungary
- Height: 1.79 m (5 ft 10 in)
- Position: Midfielder

Team information
- Current team: Como

Youth career
- –2021: ETO FC Győr
- 2021–2024: Dunajská Streda
- 2025–2026: → Como (loan)
- 2026–: Como

Senior career*
Years	Team	Apps	(Gls)
2024–2026	Dunajská Streda	14	(0)
2026–	Como	0	(0)

International career^{‡}
2022–2023	Hungary U15	12	(1)
2023–2024	Hungary U16	6	(1)
2024–	Hungary U19	4	(0)
- * Club domestic league appearances and goals as of 9 September 2025 ‡ National team caps and goals as of 18 November 2024

Levente Bősze (born 18 February 2009) is a Hungarian professional footballer who plays as a midfielder for the under-19 (Campionato Primavera 2) team of Serie A club Como.

== Early life ==
Bősze was born in Győr, Hungary, where he also grew up. The son of Levente Bősze Sr, he started playing football from the age of four to five and has regarded Portugal international Cristiano Ronaldo as his idol.

== Youth career ==
As a youth player, Bősze joined the academy of local side ETO FC Győr. In 2021, he joined the academy of Slovak side Dunajská Streda and helped the club's under-16 team win the league title before being promoted to their senior team in 2024.

== Club career ==
On 1 August 2024, Bősze made his debut for Dunajská Streda during a 1–2 home loss to Zira FK in the UEFA Conference League. On 17 August 2024, he made his league debut for them during a 3–0 away win over MFK Zemplín Michalovce, becoming the youngest player to play in the Slovak top flight at the age of fifteen, five months and twenty-nine days.

On 9 September 2025, he joined Italian club Como, where he was included in the youth team, on a loan basis.
