= Târnava (disambiguation) =

Târnava may refer to several entities in Romania:

- Târnava River
- Târnava, Sibiu, a commune in Sibiu County
- Târnava, a village in Radovan Commune, Dolj County
- Târnava, a village in Brănișca Commune, Hunedoara County
- Târnava, a village in Botoroaga Commune, Teleorman County

== See also ==
- Târnăvița (disambiguation)
- Târnova (disambiguation)
- Târnava Mare
- Târnava Mică
