= Târnova =

Târnova may refer to several places in Romania:

- Târnova, Arad, a commune
- Târnova, Caraş-Severin, a commune

Tîrnova may refer to these place in Moldova:

- Tîrnova, Donduşeni, a commune in Donduşeni district
- Tîrnova, Edineţ, a commune in Edineţ District

== See also ==
- Târnava (disambiguation)
- Tarnovo
