= 2026–27 UEFA Champions League league phase =

International football club competition in Europe

The 2026–27 UEFA Champions League league phase began on 8 September 2026 and will end on 27 January 2027. A total of 36 teams are competing in the league phase to decide the 24 places in the knockout phase of the 2026–27 UEFA Champions League.

Real Betis made their first appearance in the Champions League since the 2005–06 season. Como, LASK, Sabah and Viking made their debut appearances in the league phase/group stage. For the first season since 1999–2000, Norway has two clubs in the Champions League main stage. Additionally, two Turkish sides qualified for the main phase for the first time since the 2007–08 season. The Greek champions, AEK Athens, return to the UEFA Champions League after an eight-year absence.

A total of 16 national associations are being represented in the league phase.

== Format ==
Each team will play eight matches, four at home and four away, against eight different opponents, with all 36 teams ranked in a single league table. Teams were separated into four pots based on their 2026 UEFA club coefficients, and each team will play two teams from each of the four pots – one at home and one away. The top eight teams in the standings will receive a bye directly to the round of 16. The teams ranked from 9th to 24th will contest the knockout phase play-offs, with the teams ranked from 9th to 16th seeded for the draw while teams ranked 17th to 24th are not. Teams ranked from 25th to 36th will be eliminated from European competition.

=== Tiebreakers ===
Teams will be ranked according to points (3 points for a win, 1 point for a draw, 0 points for a loss). If two or more teams are equal on points upon completion of the league phase, the following tiebreaking criteria are applied, in the order given, to determine their rankings:

While the league phase was in progress, teams were ranked according to criteria 1–5 only, and if still tied, were given equal ranking and sorted alphabetically. Criteria 6–10 were only used after the final matches took place.

1. Goal difference;
2. Goals scored;
3. Away goals scored;
4. Wins;
5. Away wins;
6. Higher number of points obtained collectively by league phase opponents;
7. Superior collective goal difference of league phase opponents;
8. Higher number of goals scored collectively by league phase opponents;
9. Lower disciplinary points total (direct red card or expulsion for two yellow cards in one match = 3 points, yellow card = 1 point);
10. UEFA club coefficient.

== Teams and seeding ==
The 36 teams were divided into four pots of nine teams each, with the Champions League title holders automatically placed as the top seed of pot 1. All remaining teams were allocated to pots based on their 2026 UEFA club coefficients. The participants include:

- 29 teams which entered at this stage
- 7 winners of the play-off round (5 from the Champions Path, 2 from the League Path)

Key to colours
Teams ranked 1 to 8 advance to the round of 16 as a seeded team
Teams ranked 9 to 16 advance to the knockout phase play-offs as a seeded team
Teams ranked 17 to 24 advance to the knockout phase play-offs as an unseeded team

Pot 1
Team	Notes	Coeff.
(French Football Federation) Paris Saint-Germain		132.000
(German Football Association) Bayern Munich		147.500
(Royal Spanish Football Federation) Real Madrid		144.500
(The Football Association) Liverpool		130.000
(Italian Football Federation) Inter Milan		127.000
(The Football Association) Manchester City		125.500
(The Football Association) Arsenal		119.000
(Royal Spanish Football Federation) Barcelona		113.250
(Royal Spanish Football Federation) Atlético Madrid		104.750

Pot 2
Team	Notes	Coeff.
(German Football Association) Borussia Dortmund		100.750
(Italian Football Federation) Roma		97.750
(Portuguese Football Federation) Sporting CP		84.000
(The Football Association) Aston Villa		83.000
(Portuguese Football Federation) Porto		80.750
(The Football Association) Manchester United		76.500
(Royal Belgian Football Association) Club Brugge		75.250
(Royal Spanish Football Federation) Real Betis		74.500
(Royal Dutch Football Association) PSV Eindhoven		71.250

Pot 3
Team	Notes	Coeff.
(Royal Dutch Football Association) Feyenoord		71.000
(French Football Federation) Lille		68.750
(Norwegian Football Federation) Bodø/Glimt		64.000
(Italian Football Federation) Napoli		63.000
(German Football Association) RB Leipzig		61.000
(Royal Spanish Football Federation) Villarreal		59.000
(Turkish Football Federation) Fenerbahçe		57.750
(Ukrainian Association of Football) Shakhtar Donetsk		56.250
(Turkish Football Federation) Galatasaray		53.500

Pot 4
Team	Notes	Coeff.
(Football Association of the Czech Republic) Slavia Prague		44.000
(Slovak Football Association) Slovan Bratislava		36.000
(German Football Association) VfB Stuttgart		27.500
(Hellenic Football Federation) AEK Athens		24.000
(Austrian Football Association) LASK		21.000
(Italian Football Federation) Como		19.989
(French Football Federation) Lens		16.699
(Norwegian Football Federation) Viking		8.247
(Association of Football Federations of Azerbaijan) Sabah		6.000

Notes

1. ^{TH} Champions League title holders (automatic top seed of pot 1)
2. ^{EL} Europa League title holders
3. ^{CH} Winners of the play-off round (Champions Path)
4. ^{LP} Winners of the play-off round (League Path)

== Draw ==
The draw for the league phase pairings was held at the Grimaldi Forum in Monaco on 27 August 2026, with Thierry Henry, the UEFA President's Awardee, and David Villa as drawing guests.

League phase opponents by club
Club	Pot 1 opponents		Pot 2 opponents		Pot 3 opponents		Pot 4 opponents		Avg coeff.
Club	Home	Away	Home	Away	Home	Away	Home	Away	Avg coeff.
(France) Paris Saint-Germain	Barcelona	Manchester City	Roma	Aston Villa	Galatasaray	Villarreal	Slovan Bratislava	Como	73.5
(Germany) Bayern Munich	Arsenal	Atlético Madrid	Real Betis	Manchester United	Bodø/Glimt	Lille	Slavia Prague	Viking	70.0
(Spain) Real Madrid	Inter Milan	Arsenal	PSV Eindhoven	Roma	RB Leipzig	Shakhtar Donetsk	LASK	AEK Athens	72.2
(England) Liverpool	Atlético Madrid	Inter Milan	Porto	Club Brugge	Villarreal	Fenerbahçe	Lens	LASK	67.8
(Italy) Inter Milan	Liverpool	Real Madrid	Club Brugge	Borussia Dortmund	Shakhtar Donetsk	Feyenoord	VfB Stuttgart	Slovan Bratislava	80.2
(England) Manchester City	Paris Saint-Germain	Barcelona	Sporting CP	Porto	Napoli	RB Leipzig	AEK Athens	Lens	71.8
(England) Arsenal	Real Madrid	Bayern Munich	Borussia Dortmund	Real Betis	Lille	Napoli	Sabah	Slavia Prague	81.1
(Spain) Barcelona	Manchester City	Paris Saint-Germain	Aston Villa	Sporting CP	Feyenoord	Galatasaray	Como	Sabah	71.9
(Spain) Atlético Madrid	Bayern Munich	Liverpool	Manchester United	PSV Eindhoven	Fenerbahçe	Bodø/Glimt	Viking	VfB Stuttgart	72.8
(Germany) Borussia Dortmund	Inter Milan	Arsenal	Real Betis	Aston Villa	Villarreal	Bodø/Glimt	AEK Athens	Sabah	69.6
(Italy) Roma	Real Madrid	Paris Saint-Germain	Sporting CP	Manchester United	Lille	Fenerbahçe	Slovan Bratislava	AEK Athens	77.9
(Portugal) Sporting CP	Barcelona	Manchester City	Manchester United	Roma	Galatasaray	Shakhtar Donetsk	LASK	Lens	70.1
(England) Aston Villa	Paris Saint-Germain	Barcelona	Borussia Dortmund	Club Brugge	Fenerbahçe	Galatasaray	Viking	Slavia Prague	73.1
(Portugal) Porto	Manchester City	Liverpool	PSV Eindhoven	Real Betis	Napoli	Feyenoord	Slavia Prague	LASK	75.0
(England) Manchester United	Bayern Munich	Atlético Madrid	Roma	Sporting CP	RB Leipzig	Villarreal	Sabah	Como	72.5
(Belgium) Club Brugge	Liverpool	Inter Milan	Aston Villa	PSV Eindhoven	Bodø/Glimt	Napoli	Lens	VfB Stuttgart	72.8
(Spain) Real Betis	Arsenal	Bayern Munich	Porto	Borussia Dortmund	Feyenoord	Lille	Como	Slovan Bratislava	80.5
(Netherlands) PSV Eindhoven	Atlético Madrid	Real Madrid	Club Brugge	Porto	Shakhtar Donetsk	RB Leipzig	VfB Stuttgart	Viking	69.8
(Netherlands) Feyenoord	Inter Milan	Barcelona	Porto	Real Betis	RB Leipzig	Galatasaray	Como	Viking	67.3
(France) Lille	Bayern Munich	Arsenal	Real Betis	Roma	Galatasaray	Bodø/Glimt	Slovan Bratislava	VfB Stuttgart	77.5
(Norway) Bodø/Glimt	Atlético Madrid	Bayern Munich	Borussia Dortmund	Club Brugge	Lille	Napoli	LASK	Lens	74.7
(Italy) Napoli	Arsenal	Manchester City	Club Brugge	Porto	Bodø/Glimt	Villarreal	Viking	Sabah	67.2
(Germany) RB Leipzig	Manchester City	Real Madrid	PSV Eindhoven	Manchester United	Shakhtar Donetsk	Feyenoord	Lens	Como	72.7
(Spain) Villarreal	Paris Saint-Germain	Liverpool	Manchester United	Borussia Dortmund	Napoli	Fenerbahçe	Sabah	Slavia Prague	76.3
(Turkey) Fenerbahçe	Liverpool	Atlético Madrid	Roma	Aston Villa	Villarreal	Shakhtar Donetsk	Slavia Prague	LASK	74.5
(Ukraine) Shakhtar Donetsk	Real Madrid	Inter Milan	Sporting CP	PSV Eindhoven	Fenerbahçe	RB Leipzig	AEK Athens	Slovan Bratislava	75.7
(Turkey) Galatasaray	Barcelona	Paris Saint-Germain	Aston Villa	Sporting CP	Feyenoord	Lille	VfB Stuttgart	AEK Athens	75.4
(Czech Republic) Slavia Prague	Arsenal	Bayern Munich	Aston Villa	Porto	Villarreal	Fenerbahçe	Lens	Sabah	71.2
(Slovakia) Slovan Bratislava	Inter Milan	Paris Saint-Germain	Real Betis	Roma	Shakhtar Donetsk	Lille	VfB Stuttgart	LASK	75.6
(Germany) VfB Stuttgart	Atlético Madrid	Inter Milan	Club Brugge	PSV Eindhoven	Lille	Galatasaray	Viking	Slovan Bratislava	68.1
(Greece) AEK Athens	Real Madrid	Manchester City	Roma	Borussia Dortmund	Galatasaray	Shakhtar Donetsk	LASK	Como	77.4
(Austria) LASK	Liverpool	Real Madrid	Porto	Sporting CP	Fenerbahçe	Bodø/Glimt	Slovan Bratislava	AEK Athens	77.6
(Italy) Como	Paris Saint-Germain	Barcelona	Manchester United	Real Betis	RB Leipzig	Feyenoord	AEK Athens	Lens	71.1
(France) Lens	Manchester City	Liverpool	Sporting CP	Club Brugge	Bodø/Glimt	RB Leipzig	Como	Slavia Prague	75.5
(Norway) Viking	Bayern Munich	Atlético Madrid	PSV Eindhoven	Aston Villa	Feyenoord	Napoli	Sabah	VfB Stuttgart	71.8
(Azerbaijan) Sabah	Barcelona	Arsenal	Borussia Dortmund	Manchester United	Napoli	Villarreal	Slavia Prague	Viking	73.0

== League phase table ==
The top eight ranked teams receive a bye directly to the round of 16. Teams ranked from 9th to 24th contest the knockout phase play-offs, with teams ranked from 9th to 16th seeded for the draw. Teams ranked from 25th to 36th are eliminated from all competitions.

Pos	Team	Pld	W	D	L	GF	GA	GD	Pts	Qualification
1	(France) Paris Saint-Germain	4	4	0	0	20	5	+15	12	Advance to round of 16 (seeded)
2	(Spain) Real Madrid	4	4	0	0	13	7	+6	12	Advance to round of 16 (seeded)
3	(England) Arsenal	4	3	1	0	8	3	+5	10	Advance to round of 16 (seeded)
4	(Italy) Como	4	3	0	1	19	6	+13	9	Advance to round of 16 (seeded)
5	(Spain) Barcelona	4	3	0	1	14	6	+8	9	Advance to round of 16 (seeded)
6	(England) Aston Villa	4	3	0	1	12	6	+6	9	Advance to round of 16 (seeded)
7	(England) Manchester City	4	3	0	1	12	7	+5	9	Advance to round of 16 (seeded)
8	(England) Liverpool	4	3	0	1	14	10	+4	9	Advance to round of 16 (seeded)
9	(Belgium) Club Brugge	4	3	0	1	11	7	+4	9	Advance to knockout phase play-offs (seeded)
10	(Portugal) Sporting CP	4	3	0	1	8	4	+4	9	Advance to knockout phase play-offs (seeded)
11	(Spain) Real Betis	4	3	0	1	8	6	+2	9	Advance to knockout phase play-offs (seeded)
12	(Germany) Borussia Dortmund	4	3	0	1	7	5	+2	9	Advance to knockout phase play-offs (seeded)
13	(Germany) Bayern Munich	4	2	2	0	12	5	+7	8	Advance to knockout phase play-offs (seeded)
14	(Germany) VfB Stuttgart	4	2	1	1	7	4	+3	7	Advance to knockout phase play-offs (seeded)
15	(Italy) Inter Milan	4	2	0	2	8	6	+2	6	Advance to knockout phase play-offs (seeded)
16	(Austria) LASK	4	2	0	2	10	9	+1	6	Advance to knockout phase play-offs (seeded)
17	(England) Manchester United	4	2	0	2	8	8	0	6	Advance to knockout phase play-offs (unseeded)
18	(Turkey) Galatasaray	4	2	0	2	8	9	−1	6	Advance to knockout phase play-offs (unseeded)
19	(Turkey) Fenerbahçe	4	1	2	1	6	11	−5	5	Advance to knockout phase play-offs (unseeded)
20	(Italy) Roma	4	1	1	2	10	8	+2	4	Advance to knockout phase play-offs (unseeded)
21	(Ukraine) Shakhtar Donetsk	4	1	1	2	4	4	0	4	Advance to knockout phase play-offs (unseeded)
22	(Norway) Viking	4	1	1	2	9	10	−1	4	Advance to knockout phase play-offs (unseeded)
23	(Spain) Atlético Madrid	4	1	1	2	4	5	−1	4	Advance to knockout phase play-offs (unseeded)
24	(Netherlands) PSV Eindhoven	4	1	1	2	3	4	−1	4	Advance to knockout phase play-offs (unseeded)
25	(Norway) Bodø/Glimt	4	1	1	2	4	9	−5	4	
26	(Portugal) Porto	4	1	0	3	6	7	−1	3	
27	(Italy) Napoli	4	1	0	3	6	11	−5	3	
28	(Spain) Villarreal	4	1	0	3	8	14	−6	3	
29	(Greece) AEK Athens	4	1	0	3	5	11	−6	3	
29	(Germany) RB Leipzig	4	1	0	3	5	11	−6	3	
31	(Azerbaijan) Sabah	4	1	0	3	4	10	−6	3	
32	(Netherlands) Feyenoord	4	1	0	3	4	11	−7	3	
33	(France) Lens	4	1	0	3	4	16	−12	3	
34	(Czech Republic) Slavia Prague	4	0	1	3	5	9	−4	1	
35	(France) Lille	4	0	1	3	4	10	−6	1	
36	(Slovakia) Slovan Bratislava	4	0	0	4	1	17	−16	0	

Updated to match(es) played on 4 November 2026. Source: UEFA
Rules for classification: League phase tiebreakers

== Results summary ==
=== By matchday ===
Matchday 1
Home team	Score	Away team
AEK Athens (Greece)	1–0	(Austria) LASK
Club Brugge (Belgium)	2–3	(England) Aston Villa
Borussia Dortmund (Germany)	3–2	(Spain) Villarreal
Porto (Portugal)	0–2	(England) Manchester City
Lille (France)	2–3	(Spain) Real Betis
Real Madrid (Spain)	2–1	(Italy) Inter Milan
Barcelona (Spain)	5–1	(Netherlands) Feyenoord
VfB Stuttgart (Germany)	3–1	(Norway) Viking
Liverpool (England)	2–1	(Spain) Atlético Madrid
Paris Saint-Germain (France)	6–1	(Slovakia) Slovan Bratislava
Sporting CP (Portugal)	3–1	(Turkey) Galatasaray
Napoli (Italy)	0–1	(England) Arsenal
Fenerbahçe (Turkey)	1–1	(Italy) Roma
PSV Eindhoven (Netherlands)	1–1	(Ukraine) Shakhtar Donetsk
Como (Italy)	4–1	(Germany) RB Leipzig
Bayern Munich (Germany)	5–0	(Norway) Bodø/Glimt
Manchester United (England)	4–0	(Azerbaijan) Sabah
Slavia Prague (Czech Republic)	2–3	(France) Lens

Matchday 2
Home team	Score	Away team
Lens (France)	0–2	(Portugal) Sporting CP
Sabah (Azerbaijan)	2–0	(Czech Republic) Slavia Prague
Arsenal (England)	3–0	(France) Lille
Atlético Madrid (Spain)	2–0	(England) Manchester United
Inter Milan (Italy)	3–4	(Belgium) Club Brugge
Galatasaray (Turkey)	1–4	(Spain) Barcelona
RB Leipzig (Germany)	1–0	(Netherlands) PSV Eindhoven
Viking (Norway)	3–3	(Germany) Bayern Munich
Villarreal (Spain)	3–1	(Italy) Napoli
Feyenoord (Netherlands)	3–2	(Italy) Como
LASK (Austria)	3–6	(England) Liverpool
Roma (Italy)	3–4	(Spain) Real Madrid
Aston Villa (England)	6–0	(Turkey) Fenerbahçe
Shakhtar Donetsk (Ukraine)	3–1	(Greece) AEK Athens
Bodø/Glimt (Norway)	1–0	(Germany) Borussia Dortmund
Manchester City (England)	2–4	(France) Paris Saint-Germain
Real Betis (Spain)	3–2	(Portugal) Porto
Slovan Bratislava (Slovakia)	0–3	(Germany) VfB Stuttgart

Matchday 3
Home team	Score	Away team
Fenerbahçe (Turkey)	2–2	(Czech Republic) Slavia Prague
Sabah (Azerbaijan)	1–2	(Germany) Borussia Dortmund
Roma (Italy)	4–0	(Slovakia) Slovan Bratislava
Porto (Portugal)	0–1	(Netherlands) PSV Eindhoven
Liverpool (England)	4–3	(Spain) Villarreal
Manchester City (England)	5–1	(Greece) AEK Athens
Paris Saint-Germain (France)	4–2	(Spain) Barcelona
Napoli (Italy)	4–3	(Norway) Bodø/Glimt
VfB Stuttgart (Germany)	1–1	(Spain) Atlético Madrid
Como (Italy)	4–1	(England) Manchester United
Lille (France)	2–4	(Turkey) Galatasaray
Aston Villa (England)	3–1	(Norway) Viking
Club Brugge (Belgium)	3–0	(France) Lens
Bayern Munich (Germany)	2–2	(England) Arsenal
Inter Milan (Italy)	1–0	(Ukraine) Shakhtar Donetsk
Real Madrid (Spain)	4–1	(Germany) RB Leipzig
Real Betis (Spain)	1–0	(Netherlands) Feyenoord
Sporting CP (Portugal)	2–3	(Austria) LASK

Matchday 4
Home team	Score	Away team
Shakhtar Donetsk (Ukraine)	0–1	(Portugal) Sporting CP
Galatasaray (Turkey)	2–0	(Germany) VfB Stuttgart
Atlético Madrid (Spain)	0–2	(Germany) Bayern Munich
Barcelona (Spain)	3–0	(England) Aston Villa
Feyenoord (Netherlands)	0–3	(Italy) Inter Milan
Bodø/Glimt (Norway)	0–0	(France) Lille
LASK (Austria)	4–0	(Slovakia) Slovan Bratislava
Manchester United (England)	3–2	(Italy) Roma
Villarreal (Spain)	0–6	(France) Paris Saint-Germain
AEK Athens (Greece)	2–3	(Spain) Real Madrid
Fenerbahçe (Turkey)	3–2	(England) Liverpool
Borussia Dortmund (Germany)	2–1	(Spain) Real Betis
Porto (Portugal)	4–1	(Italy) Napoli
PSV Eindhoven (Netherlands)	1–2	(Belgium) Club Brugge
RB Leipzig (Germany)	2–3	(England) Manchester City
Lens (France)	1–9	(Italy) Como
Slavia Prague (Czech Republic)	1–2	(England) Arsenal
Viking (Norway)	4–1	(Azerbaijan) Sabah

Matchday 5
Home team	Score	Away team
Bodø/Glimt (Norway)	24 Nov	(Austria) LASK
Galatasaray (Turkey)	24 Nov	(England) Aston Villa
Arsenal (England)	24 Nov	(Germany) Borussia Dortmund
Como (Italy)	24 Nov	(Greece) AEK Athens
Feyenoord (Netherlands)	24 Nov	(Portugal) Porto
Manchester City (England)	24 Nov	(Italy) Napoli
RB Leipzig (Germany)	24 Nov	(France) Lens
Real Madrid (Spain)	24 Nov	(Netherlands) PSV Eindhoven
Slovan Bratislava (Slovakia)	24 Nov	(Spain) Real Betis
Sabah (Azerbaijan)	25 Nov	(Spain) Barcelona
Slavia Prague (Czech Republic)	25 Nov	(Spain) Villarreal
Atlético Madrid (Spain)	25 Nov	(Norway) Viking
Club Brugge (Belgium)	25 Nov	(England) Liverpool
Inter Milan (Italy)	25 Nov	(Germany) VfB Stuttgart
Shakhtar Donetsk (Ukraine)	25 Nov	(Turkey) Fenerbahçe
Lille (France)	25 Nov	(Germany) Bayern Munich
Paris Saint-Germain (France)	25 Nov	(Italy) Roma
Sporting CP (Portugal)	25 Nov	(England) Manchester United

Matchday 6
Home team	Score	Away team
Viking (Norway)	8 Dec	(Netherlands) Feyenoord
Villarreal (Spain)	8 Dec	(Azerbaijan) Sabah
AEK Athens (Greece)	8 Dec	(Turkey) Galatasaray
Roma (Italy)	8 Dec	(Portugal) Sporting CP
Aston Villa (England)	8 Dec	(France) Paris Saint-Germain
Barcelona (Spain)	8 Dec	(England) Manchester City
Bayern Munich (Germany)	8 Dec	(Czech Republic) Slavia Prague
Manchester United (England)	8 Dec	(Germany) RB Leipzig
Napoli (Italy)	8 Dec	(Belgium) Club Brugge
Real Betis (Spain)	9 Dec	(Italy) Como
Slovan Bratislava (Slovakia)	9 Dec	(Ukraine) Shakhtar Donetsk
Arsenal (England)	9 Dec	(Spain) Real Madrid
Borussia Dortmund (Germany)	9 Dec	(Italy) Inter Milan
LASK (Austria)	9 Dec	(Turkey) Fenerbahçe
Liverpool (England)	9 Dec	(Portugal) Porto
PSV Eindhoven (Netherlands)	9 Dec	(Spain) Atlético Madrid
Lens (France)	9 Dec	(Norway) Bodø/Glimt
VfB Stuttgart (Germany)	9 Dec	(France) Lille

Matchday 7
Home team	Score	Away team
Bodø/Glimt (Norway)	19 Jan	(Spain) Atlético Madrid
Galatasaray (Turkey)	19 Jan	(Netherlands) Feyenoord
AEK Athens (Greece)	19 Jan	(Italy) Roma
Aston Villa (England)	19 Jan	(Germany) Borussia Dortmund
Inter Milan (Italy)	19 Jan	(England) Liverpool
Porto (Portugal)	19 Jan	(Czech Republic) Slavia Prague
Lille (France)	19 Jan	(Slovakia) Slovan Bratislava
Real Madrid (Spain)	19 Jan	(Austria) LASK
VfB Stuttgart (Germany)	19 Jan	(Belgium) Club Brugge
Fenerbahçe (Turkey)	20 Jan	(Spain) Villarreal
Sabah (Azerbaijan)	20 Jan	(Italy) Napoli
Como (Italy)	20 Jan	(France) Paris Saint-Germain
Manchester United (England)	20 Jan	(Germany) Bayern Munich
RB Leipzig (Germany)	20 Jan	(Ukraine) Shakhtar Donetsk
Lens (France)	20 Jan	(England) Manchester City
Real Betis (Spain)	20 Jan	(England) Arsenal
Sporting CP (Portugal)	20 Jan	(Spain) Barcelona
Viking (Norway)	20 Jan	(Netherlands) PSV Eindhoven

Matchday 8
Home team	Score	Away team
Arsenal (England)	27 Jan	(Azerbaijan) Sabah
Roma (Italy)	27 Jan	(France) Lille
Atlético Madrid (Spain)	27 Jan	(Turkey) Fenerbahçe
Borussia Dortmund (Germany)	27 Jan	(Greece) AEK Athens
Club Brugge (Belgium)	27 Jan	(Norway) Bodø/Glimt
Bayern Munich (Germany)	27 Jan	(Spain) Real Betis
Barcelona (Spain)	27 Jan	(Italy) Como
Shakhtar Donetsk (Ukraine)	27 Jan	(Spain) Real Madrid
Feyenoord (Netherlands)	27 Jan	(Germany) RB Leipzig
LASK (Austria)	27 Jan	(Portugal) Porto
Liverpool (England)	27 Jan	(France) Lens
Manchester City (England)	27 Jan	(Portugal) Sporting CP
Paris Saint-Germain (France)	27 Jan	(Turkey) Galatasaray
PSV Eindhoven (Netherlands)	27 Jan	(Germany) VfB Stuttgart
Slavia Prague (Czech Republic)	27 Jan	(England) Aston Villa
Napoli (Italy)	27 Jan	(Norway) Viking
Villarreal (Spain)	27 Jan	(England) Manchester United
Slovan Bratislava (Slovakia)	27 Jan	(Italy) Inter Milan

=== By team ===
Results by Pot 1 team
Team	Matchday							
Team	1	2	3	4	5	6	7	8
(France) Paris Saint-Germain	SLO (H)	MCI (A)	BAR (H)	VIL (A)	ROM (H)	AVL (A)	COM (A)	GAL (H)
(France) Paris Saint-Germain	6–1	4–2	4–2	6–0	25 Nov	8 Dec	20 Jan	27 Jan
(Germany) Bayern Munich	BOD (H)	VIK (A)	ARS (H)	ATM (A)	LIL (A)	SLP (H)	MUN (A)	BET (H)
(Germany) Bayern Munich	5–0	3–3	2–2	2–0	25 Nov	8 Dec	20 Jan	27 Jan
(Spain) Real Madrid	INT (H)	ROM (A)	RBL (H)	AEK (A)	PSV (H)	ARS (A)	LASK (H)	SHK (A)
(Spain) Real Madrid	2–1	4–3	4–1	3–2	24 Nov	9 Dec	19 Jan	27 Jan
(England) Liverpool	ATM (H)	LASK (A)	VIL (H)	FEN (A)	BRU (A)	POR (H)	INT (A)	LEN (H)
(England) Liverpool	2–1	6–3	4–3	2–3	25 Nov	9 Dec	19 Jan	27 Jan
(Italy) Inter Milan	RMA (A)	BRU (H)	SHK (H)	FEY (A)	STU (H)	DOR (A)	LIV (H)	SLO (A)
(Italy) Inter Milan	1–2	3–4	1–0	3–0	25 Nov	9 Dec	19 Jan	27 Jan
(England) Manchester City	POR (A)	PSG (H)	AEK (H)	RBL (A)	NAP (H)	BAR (A)	LEN (A)	SPO (H)
(England) Manchester City	2–0	2–4	5–1	3–2	24 Nov	8 Dec	20 Jan	27 Jan
(England) Arsenal	NAP (A)	LIL (H)	BAY (A)	SLP (A)	DOR (H)	RMA (H)	BET (A)	SAB (H)
(England) Arsenal	1–0	3–0	2–2	2–1	24 Nov	9 Dec	20 Jan	27 Jan
(Spain) Barcelona	FEY (H)	GAL (A)	PSG (A)	AVL (H)	SAB (A)	MCI (H)	SPO (A)	COM (H)
(Spain) Barcelona	5–1	4–1	2–4	3–0	25 Nov	8 Dec	20 Jan	27 Jan
(Spain) Atlético Madrid	LIV (A)	MUN (H)	STU (A)	BAY (H)	VIK (H)	PSV (A)	BOD (A)	FEN (H)
(Spain) Atlético Madrid	1–2	2–0	1–1	0–2	25 Nov	9 Dec	19 Jan	27 Jan

Results by Pot 2 team
Team	Matchday							
Team	1	2	3	4	5	6	7	8
(Germany) Borussia Dortmund	VIL (H)	BOD (A)	SAB (A)	BET (H)	ARS (A)	INT (H)	AVL (A)	AEK (H)
(Germany) Borussia Dortmund	3–2	0–1	2–1	2–1	24 Nov	9 Dec	19 Jan	27 Jan
(Italy) Roma	FEN (A)	RMA (H)	SLO (H)	MUN (A)	PSG (A)	SPO (H)	AEK (A)	LIL (H)
(Italy) Roma	1–1	3–4	4–0	2–3	25 Nov	8 Dec	19 Jan	27 Jan
(Portugal) Sporting CP	GAL (H)	LEN (A)	LASK (H)	SHK (A)	MUN (H)	ROM (A)	BAR (H)	MCI (A)
(Portugal) Sporting CP	3–1	2–0	2–3	1–0	25 Nov	8 Dec	20 Jan	27 Jan
(England) Aston Villa	BRU (A)	FEN (H)	VIK (H)	BAR (A)	GAL (A)	PSG (H)	DOR (H)	SLP (A)
(England) Aston Villa	3–2	6–0	3–1	0–3	24 Nov	8 Dec	19 Jan	27 Jan
(Portugal) Porto	MCI (H)	BET (A)	PSV (H)	NAP (H)	FEY (A)	LIV (A)	SLP (H)	LASK (A)
(Portugal) Porto	0–2	2–3	0–1	4–1	24 Nov	9 Dec	19 Jan	27 Jan
(England) Manchester United	SAB (H)	ATM (A)	COM (A)	ROM (H)	SPO (A)	RBL (H)	BAY (H)	VIL (A)
(England) Manchester United	4–0	0–2	1–4	3–2	25 Nov	8 Dec	20 Jan	27 Jan
(Belgium) Club Brugge	AVL (H)	INT (A)	LEN (H)	PSV (A)	LIV (H)	NAP (A)	STU (A)	BOD (H)
(Belgium) Club Brugge	2–3	4–3	3–0	2–1	25 Nov	8 Dec	19 Jan	27 Jan
(Spain) Real Betis	LIL (A)	POR (H)	FEY (H)	DOR (A)	SLO (A)	COM (H)	ARS (H)	BAY (A)
(Spain) Real Betis	3–2	3–2	1–0	1–2	24 Nov	9 Dec	20 Jan	27 Jan
(Netherlands) PSV Eindhoven	SHK (H)	RBL (A)	POR (A)	BRU (H)	RMA (A)	ATM (H)	VIK (A)	STU (H)
(Netherlands) PSV Eindhoven	1–1	0–1	1–0	1–2	24 Nov	9 Dec	20 Jan	27 Jan

Results by Pot 3 team
Team	Matchday							
Team	1	2	3	4	5	6	7	8
(Netherlands) Feyenoord	BAR (A)	COM (H)	BET (A)	INT (H)	POR (H)	VIK (A)	GAL (A)	RBL (H)
(Netherlands) Feyenoord	1–5	3–2	0–1	0–3	24 Nov	8 Dec	19 Jan	27 Jan
(France) Lille	BET (H)	ARS (A)	GAL (H)	BOD (A)	BAY (H)	STU (A)	SLO (H)	ROM (A)
(France) Lille	2–3	0–3	2–4	0–0	25 Nov	9 Dec	19 Jan	27 Jan
(Norway) Bodø/Glimt	BAY (A)	DOR (H)	NAP (A)	LIL (H)	LASK (H)	LEN (A)	ATM (H)	BRU (A)
(Norway) Bodø/Glimt	0–5	1–0	3–4	0–0	24 Nov	9 Dec	19 Jan	27 Jan
(Italy) Napoli	ARS (H)	VIL (A)	BOD (H)	POR (A)	MCI (A)	BRU (H)	SAB (A)	VIK (H)
(Italy) Napoli	0–1	1–3	4–3	1–4	24 Nov	8 Dec	20 Jan	27 Jan
(Germany) RB Leipzig	COM (A)	PSV (H)	RMA (A)	MCI (H)	LEN (H)	MUN (A)	SHK (H)	FEY (A)
(Germany) RB Leipzig	1–4	1–0	1–4	2–3	24 Nov	8 Dec	20 Jan	27 Jan
(Spain) Villarreal	DOR (A)	NAP (H)	LIV (A)	PSG (H)	SLP (A)	SAB (H)	FEN (A)	MUN (H)
(Spain) Villarreal	2–3	3–1	3–4	0–6	25 Nov	8 Dec	20 Jan	27 Jan
(Turkey) Fenerbahçe	ROM (H)	AVL (A)	SLP (H)	LIV (H)	SHK (A)	LASK (A)	VIL (H)	ATM (A)
(Turkey) Fenerbahçe	1–1	0–6	2–2	3–2	25 Nov	9 Dec	20 Jan	27 Jan
(Ukraine) Shakhtar Donetsk	PSV (A)	AEK (H)	INT (A)	SPO (H)	FEN (H)	SLO (A)	RBL (A)	RMA (H)
(Ukraine) Shakhtar Donetsk	1–1	3–1	0–1	0–1	25 Nov	9 Dec	20 Jan	27 Jan
(Turkey) Galatasaray	SPO (A)	BAR (H)	LIL (A)	STU (H)	AVL (H)	AEK (A)	FEY (H)	PSG (A)
(Turkey) Galatasaray	1–3	1–4	4–2	2–0	24 Nov	8 Dec	19 Jan	27 Jan

Results by Pot 4 team
Team	Matchday							
Team	1	2	3	4	5	6	7	8
(Czech Republic) Slavia Prague	LEN (H)	SAB (A)	FEN (A)	ARS (H)	VIL (H)	BAY (A)	POR (A)	AVL (H)
(Czech Republic) Slavia Prague	2–3	0–2	2–2	1–2	25 Nov	8 Dec	19 Jan	27 Jan
(Slovakia) Slovan Bratislava	PSG (A)	STU (H)	ROM (A)	LASK (A)	BET (H)	SHK (H)	LIL (A)	INT (H)
(Slovakia) Slovan Bratislava	1–6	0–3	0–4	0–4	24 Nov	9 Dec	19 Jan	27 Jan
(Germany) VfB Stuttgart	VIK (H)	SLO (A)	ATM (H)	GAL (A)	INT (A)	LIL (H)	BRU (H)	PSV (A)
(Germany) VfB Stuttgart	3–1	3–0	1–1	0–2	25 Nov	9 Dec	19 Jan	27 Jan
(Greece) AEK Athens	LASK (H)	SHK (A)	MCI (A)	RMA (H)	COM (A)	GAL (H)	ROM (H)	DOR (A)
(Greece) AEK Athens	1–0	1–3	1–5	2–3	24 Nov	8 Dec	19 Jan	27 Jan
(Austria) LASK	AEK (A)	LIV (H)	SPO (A)	SLO (H)	BOD (A)	FEN (H)	RMA (A)	POR (H)
(Austria) LASK	0–1	3–6	3–2	4–0	24 Nov	9 Dec	19 Jan	27 Jan
(Italy) Como	RBL (H)	FEY (A)	MUN (H)	LEN (A)	AEK (H)	BET (A)	PSG (H)	BAR (A)
(Italy) Como	4–1	2–3	4–1	9–1	24 Nov	9 Dec	20 Jan	27 Jan
(France) Lens	SLP (A)	SPO (H)	BRU (A)	COM (H)	RBL (A)	BOD (H)	MCI (H)	LIV (A)
(France) Lens	3–2	0–2	0–3	1–9	24 Nov	9 Dec	20 Jan	27 Jan
(Norway) Viking	STU (A)	BAY (H)	AVL (A)	SAB (H)	ATM (A)	FEY (H)	PSV (H)	NAP (A)
(Norway) Viking	1–3	3–3	1–3	4–1	25 Nov	8 Dec	20 Jan	27 Jan
(Azerbaijan) Sabah	MUN (A)	SLP (H)	DOR (H)	VIK (A)	BAR (H)	VIL (A)	NAP (H)	ARS (A)
(Azerbaijan) Sabah	0–4	2–0	1–2	1–4	25 Nov	8 Dec	20 Jan	27 Jan

Updated to match(es) played on 4 November 2026. Source: UEFA
Scores and legend colours are listed from the perspective of the team in the "Team" column.
Legend: H = home, A = away. Green = win; Yellow = draw; Red = loss.

== Matches ==
The fixture list was announced on 29 August 2026, two days after the draw. This was to ensure no calendar clashes with teams in the Europa League and Conference League playing in the same cities.

In principle, each team will not play more than two home matches or two away matches in a row, and will play one home match and one away match across both the first and last two matchdays. The matches will be played on 8–10 September (exclusive week), (Note: As part of the scheduling for the 2026–27 UEFA men's club season, each competition will have an "exclusive week" in the calendar, with no other competitions scheduled during this week. For the Champions League, this took place on matchday 1 (8–10 September 2026).) 13–14 October, 20–21 October, 3–4 November, 24–25 November and 8–9 December 2026, 19–20 January and 27 January 2027. All matches will be played on Tuesdays and Wednesdays, except for the competition's exclusive week, which also included Thursday fixtures. The scheduled kick-off times are 18:45 (two matches on each day) and 21:00 (remaining matches) CET/CEST. The only exception is the final matchday, where all fixtures will be played simultaneously at 21:00.

Times are CET or CEST, (Note: CEST (UTC+2) for dates up to 24 October 2026 (matchdays 1–3), and CET (UTC+1) for dates thereafter (matchdays 4–8).) as listed by UEFA (local times, if different, are in parentheses).

=== Matchday 1 ===
8 September 2026
18:45 (19:45 UTC+3)

AEK Athens (Greece)	1–0	(Austria) LASK
Marin 21'	Report

Agia Sophia Stadium, Athens
Attendance: 30,221
Referee: Luís Godinho (Portugal)

8 September 2026
18:45

Club Brugge (Belgium)	2–3	(England) Aston Villa
Vetlesen 19'; Tresoldi 61' (pen.)	Report	McGinn 11'; Buendía 22'; Jackson 43'

Jan Breydel Stadium, Bruges
Attendance: 24,286
Referee: Sandro Schärer (Switzerland)

8 September 2026
21:00

Borussia Dortmund (Germany)	3–2	(Spain) Villarreal
Veiga 53' (o.g.); Guirassy 80', 85' (pen.)	Report	Mouriño 66'; Guirassy 90+3' (o.g.)

Westfalenstadion, Dortmund
Attendance: 77,500
Referee: Simone Sozza (Italy)

8 September 2026
21:00 (20:00 UTC+1)

Porto (Portugal)	0–2	(England) Manchester City
	Report	Haaland 47', 90+1'

Estádio do Dragão, Porto
Attendance: 49,106
Referee: Szymon Marciniak (Poland)

8 September 2026
21:00

Lille (France)	2–3	(Spain) Real Betis
Ueda 12'; Alexsandro 36'	Report	Bartra 33', 49'; Parrott 53'

Stade Pierre-Mauroy, Villeneuve-d'Ascq
Attendance: 38,587
Referee: Georgi Kabakov (Bulgaria)

8 September 2026
21:00

Real Madrid (Spain)	2–1	(Italy) Inter Milan
Mbappé 14'; Valverde 23'	Report	Carlos Augusto 77'

Bernabéu, Madrid
Attendance: 74,858
Referee: Michael Oliver (England)

9 September 2026
18:45

Barcelona (Spain)	5–1	(Netherlands) Feyenoord
Raphinha 3', 57'; Adeyemi 22'; Yamal 77'; Gabriel Jesus 85'	Report	Steijn 82'

Camp Nou, Barcelona
Attendance: 45,838
Referee: Sven Jablonski (Germany)

9 September 2026
18:45

VfB Stuttgart (Germany)	3–1	(Norway) Viking
Demirović 20', 26', 32'	Report	Tripić 22'

MHPArena, Stuttgart
Attendance: 57,500
Referee: Nenad Minaković (Serbia)

9 September 2026
21:00 (20:00 UTC+1)

Liverpool (England)	2–1	(Spain) Atlético Madrid
Szoboszlai 40'; Mac Allister 50'	Report	Llorente 17'

Anfield, Liverpool
Attendance: 59,870
Referee: Davide Massa (Italy)

9 September 2026
21:00

Paris Saint-Germain (France)	6–1	(Slovakia) Slovan Bratislava
Dembélé 17', 23'; Torres 31', 47', 57'; Fabián 88'	Report	Su. Camara 59'

Parc des Princes, Paris
Attendance: 47,511
Referee: Mykola Balakin (Ukraine)

9 September 2026
21:00 (20:00 UTC+1)

Sporting CP (Portugal)	3–1	(Turkey) Galatasaray
Catamo 27'; Suárez 57' (pen.); Zalazar 63'	Report	Inácio 5' (o.g.)

Estádio José Alvalade, Lisbon
Attendance: 44,054
Referee: Espen Eskås (Norway)

9 September 2026
21:00

Napoli (Italy)	0–1	(England) Arsenal
	Report	Ødegaard 75'

Stadio Diego Armando Maradona, Naples
Attendance: 44,083
Referee: Glenn Nyberg (Sweden)

10 September 2026
18:45 (19:45 UTC+3)

Fenerbahçe (Turkey)	1–1	(Italy) Roma
Brown 48'	Report	Cristante 39'

Şükrü Saracoğlu Stadium, Istanbul
Attendance: 40,577
Referee: Jesús Gil Manzano (Spain)

10 September 2026
18:45

PSV Eindhoven (Netherlands)	1–1	(Ukraine) Shakhtar Donetsk
Dest 48'	Report	Mendoza 45+1'

Philips Stadion, Eindhoven
Attendance: 34,900
Referee: Halil Umut Meler (Turkey)

10 September 2026
21:00

Como (Italy)	4–1	(Germany) RB Leipzig
Baturina 15'; Douvikas 38'; Diao 54'; Perrone 90'	Report	Maksimović 58'

Stadio Giuseppe Sinigaglia, Como
Attendance: 10,198
Referee: Serdar Gözübüyük (Netherlands)

10 September 2026
21:00

Bayern Munich (Germany)	5–0	(Norway) Bodø/Glimt
Musiala 47'; Kane 61'; Davies 77'; Olise 83', 90+2'	Report

Allianz Arena, Munich
Attendance: 75,000
Referee: Rade Obrenović (Slovenia)

10 September 2026
21:00 (20:00 UTC+1)

Manchester United (England)	4–0	(Azerbaijan) Sabah
Cunha 27'; Fernandes 42'; Šeško 45'; Martínez 68'	Report

Old Trafford, Manchester
Attendance: 73,685
Referee: Willy Delajod (France)

10 September 2026
21:00

Slavia Prague (Czech Republic)	2–3	(France) Lens
Šturm 51', 88'	Report	Sima 73'; Thauvin 90+1'; Aguilar 90+3'

Fortuna Arena, Prague
Attendance: 18,542
Referee: Vasilios Fotias (Greece)

=== Matchday 2 ===
13 October 2026
18:45

Lens (France)	0−2	(Portugal) Sporting CP
	Report	Suárez 22'; Doumbia 74'

Stade Bollaert-Delelis, Lens
Attendance: 37,548
Referee: Igor Pajač (Croatia)

13 October 2026
18:45 (20:45 UTC+4)

Sabah (Azerbaijan)	2−0	(Czech Republic) Slavia Prague
Parris 49'; Mickels 88'	Report

Olympic Stadium, Baku (Note: Sabah will play their home matches at Olympic Stadium, Baku, instead of their regular stadium, Bank Respublika Arena, Masazir, which does not meet UEFA requirements.)
Attendance: 29,670
Referee: Sebastian Gishamer (Austria)

13 October 2026
21:00 (20:00 UTC+1)

Arsenal (England)	3−0	(France) Lille
Timber 64'; Eze 67'; Saka 71'	Report

Emirates Stadium, London
Attendance: 57,024
Referee: Felix Zwayer (Germany)

13 October 2026
21:00

Atlético Madrid (Spain)	2−0	(England) Manchester United
Barrios 1'; Lookman 79'	Report

Metropolitano Stadium, Madrid
Attendance: 69,493
Referee: Glenn Nyberg (Sweden)

13 October 2026
21:00

Inter Milan (Italy)	3−4	(Belgium) Club Brugge
L. Martínez 44', 81'; Bonny 90+3'	Report	Tresoldi 30' (pen.), 63', 74'; Vermant 87'

San Siro, Milan
Attendance: 73,859
Referee: Rohit Saggi (Norway)

13 October 2026
21:00 (22:00 UTC+3)

Galatasaray (Turkey)	1−4	(Spain) Barcelona
Batrakov 28'	Report	Cancelo 43'; López 50'; Gordon 53'; Adeyemi 65'

Rams Park, Istanbul
Attendance: 49,623
Referee: Marco Guida (Italy)

13 October 2026
21:00

RB Leipzig (Germany)	1−0	(Netherlands) PSV Eindhoven
Gruda 75'	Report

Red Bull Arena, Leipzig
Attendance: 43,187
Referee: Nick Walsh (Scotland)

13 October 2026
21:00

Viking (Norway)	3−3	(Germany) Bayern Munich
Stensness 2'; Christiansen 38'; H. Haugen 90'	Report	Kane 54' (pen.), 60'; Díaz 71'

Viking Stadion, Stavanger
Attendance: 15,466
Referee: Georgi Kabakov (Bulgaria)

13 October 2026
21:00

Villarreal (Spain)	3−1	(Italy) Napoli
Mikautadze 23'; Mouriño 26'; Oluwaseyi 86'	Report	Rrahmani 8'

Estadio de la Cerámica, Villarreal
Attendance: 19,128
Referee: Daniel Siebert (Germany)

14 October 2026
18:45

Feyenoord (Netherlands)	3–2	(Italy) Como
Zechiël 20'; Hadj Moussa 52'; Sánchez 81' (o.g.)	Report	Diao 18'; Douvikas 90+3'

De Kuip, Rotterdam
Attendance: 43,951
Referee: Donatas Rumšas (Lithuania)

14 October 2026
18:45

LASK (Austria)	3–6	(England) Liverpool
Ljubičić 63'; Flecker 74', 77'	Report	Araújo 22'; Barcola 24', 37', 66'; Frimpong 51'; Koumas 72'

Raiffeisen Arena, Linz
Attendance: 18,910
Referee: Tobias Stieler (Germany)

14 October 2026
21:00

Roma (Italy)	3–4	(Spain) Real Madrid
De Roon 20'; Malen 51', 57'	Report	Mbappé 25'; Espí 82'; Endrick 85'; Rüdiger 90'

Stadio Olimpico, Rome
Attendance: 64,256
Referee: François Letexier (France)

14 October 2026
21:00 (20:00 UTC+1)

Aston Villa (England)	6–0	(Turkey) Fenerbahçe
Manzambi 12'; Jackson 31', 39'; Barkley 68' (pen.), 72'; Abraham 90'	Report

Villa Park, Birmingham
Attendance: 34,705
Referee: Ivan Kružliak (Slovakia)

14 October 2026
21:00 (20:00 UTC+0)

Shakhtar Donetsk (Ukraine)	3–1	(Greece) AEK Athens
Pedrinho 34' (pen.); Vinicius Tobias 80'; Mendoza 86'	Report	Majer 28'

Stamford Bridge, London, England (Note: Due to the Russian invasion of Ukraine, Ukrainian teams are required to play their home matches at neutral venues until further notice. Therefore, Shakhtar Donetsk will play their home matches at Stamford Bridge, London, England, instead of their regular stadium, Donbas Arena, Donetsk.)
Attendance: 21,119
Referee: Chris Kavanagh (England)

14 October 2026
21:00

Bodø/Glimt (Norway)	1–0	(Germany) Borussia Dortmund
Sjøvold 52'	Report

Aspmyra Stadion, Bodø
Attendance: 7,885
Referee: Urs Schnyder (Switzerland)

14 October 2026
21:00 (20:00 UTC+1)

Manchester City (England)	2–4	(France) Paris Saint-Germain
Haaland 53', 75'	Report	Doué 13'; Dembélé 15'; Vitinha 32'; Akliouche 63'

Etihad Stadium, Manchester
Attendance: 60,021
Referee: Sven Jablonski (Germany)

14 October 2026
21:00

Real Betis (Spain)	3–2	(Portugal) Porto
Ezzalzouli 47'; Hernández 74'; Isco 84' (pen.)	Report	Veiga 54'; Aghehowa 61'

La Cartuja, Seville (Note: Real Betis will play their home matches at La Cartuja, Seville, instead of their regular stadium, Benito Villamarín, Seville, due to renovation works.)
Attendance: 67,114
Referee: Clément Turpin (France)

14 October 2026
21:00

Slovan Bratislava (Slovakia)	0–3	(Germany) VfB Stuttgart
	Report	Undav 29'; Cruz 65' (o.g.); Demirović 90'

Tehelné pole, Bratislava
Attendance: 19,725
Referee: Irfan Peljto (Bosnia and Herzegovina)

=== Matchday 3 ===
20 October 2026
18:45 (19:45 UTC+3)

Fenerbahçe (Turkey)	2−2	(Czech Republic) Slavia Prague
Aydın 4'; Greenwood 11'	Report	Provod 15'; Kačor 90'

Şükrü Saracoğlu Stadium, Istanbul
Attendance: 40,147
Referee: Ricardo de Burgos Bengoetxea (Spain)

20 October 2026
18:45 (20:45 UTC+4)

Sabah (Azerbaijan)	1−2	(Germany) Borussia Dortmund
McCarthy 39'	Report	Guirassy 10', 53'

Olympic Stadium, Baku
Attendance: 47,221
Referee: Javier Alberola Rojas (Spain)

20 October 2026
21:00

Roma (Italy)	4−0	(Slovakia) Slovan Bratislava
Hermoso 21'; Molina 39'; Pisilli 52'; Malen 58' (pen.)	Report

Stadio Olimpico, Rome
Attendance: 64,399
Referee: Sandro Schärer (Switzerland)

20 October 2026
21:00 (20:00 UTC+1)

Porto (Portugal)	0−1	(Netherlands) PSV Eindhoven
	Report	Til 57'

Estádio do Dragão, Porto
Attendance: 48,935
Referee: Daniel Siebert (Germany)

20 October 2026
21:00 (20:00 UTC+1)

Liverpool (England)	4−3	(Spain) Villarreal
Mac Allister 36', 65'; Araújo 45+2'; Wirtz 69'	Report	Mikautadze 4'; Cardona 29'; Oluwaseyi 87'

Anfield, Liverpool
Attendance: 59,610
Referee: Szymon Marciniak (Poland)

20 October 2026
21:00 (20:00 UTC+1)

Manchester City (England)	5−1	(Greece) AEK Athens
Anderson 12'; Foden 34', 65', 76'; Cherki 57'	Report	Pilios 52'

Etihad Stadium, Manchester
Attendance: 40,042
Referee: Willy Delajod (France)

20 October 2026
21:00

Paris Saint-Germain (France)	4−2	(Spain) Barcelona
Doué 38'; Hernandez 72'; Vitinha 81'; Fabián 86'	Report	Espart 55'; Yamal 79'

Parc des Princes, Paris
Attendance: 47,421
Referee: Michael Oliver (England)

20 October 2026
21:00

Napoli (Italy)	4−3	(Norway) Bodø/Glimt
Politano 1'; McTominay 41', 75'; Bjørtuft 88' (o.g.)	Report	Hauge 27'; Helmersen 62'; Fet 90+4'

Stadio Diego Armando Maradona, Naples
Attendance: 35,096
Referee: José María Sánchez Martínez (Spain)

20 October 2026
21:00

VfB Stuttgart (Germany)	1−1	(Spain) Atlético Madrid
Leweling 36'	Report	Alvarez 47'

MHPArena, Stuttgart
Attendance: 58,000
Referee: Serdar Gözübüyük (Netherlands)

21 October 2026
18:45

Como (Italy)	4–1	(England) Manchester United
Paz 2', 57'; Douvikas 49'; Ramón 76'	Report	Zirkzee 90+1'

Stadio Giuseppe Sinigaglia, Como
Attendance: 10,875
Referee: Sven Jablonski (Germany)

21 October 2026
18:45

Lille (France)	2–4	(Turkey) Galatasaray
Diaoune 7', 39'	Report	Akgün 2'; Batrakov 44'; Bentaleb 52' (o.g.); Osimhen 61'

Stade Pierre-Mauroy, Villeneuve-d'Ascq
Attendance: 44,142
Referee: Rade Obrenović (Slovenia)

21 October 2026
21:00 (20:00 UTC+1)

Aston Villa (England)	3−1	(Norway) Viking
Barkley 23'; Buendía 37' (pen.); Heggheim 62' (o.g.)	Report	Christiansen 84'

Villa Park, Birmingham
Attendance: 33,410
Referee: Sebastian Gishamer (Austria)

21 October 2026
21:00

Club Brugge (Belgium)	3−0	(France) Lens
Vanaken 45+3'; Seys 50'; Forbs 72'	Report

Jan Breydel Stadium, Bruges
Attendance: 26,023
Referee: Luís Godinho (Portugal)

21 October 2026
21:00

Bayern Munich (Germany)	2−2	(England) Arsenal
Davies 35'; Kane 61' (pen.)	Report	Eze 25'; Rice 82'

Allianz Arena, Munich
Attendance: 75,000
Referee: Davide Massa (Italy)

21 October 2026
21:00

Inter Milan (Italy)	1−0	(Ukraine) Shakhtar Donetsk
Carlos Augusto 77'	Report

San Siro, Milan
Attendance: 73,352
Referee: Harm Osmers (Germany)

21 October 2026
21:00

Real Madrid (Spain)	4−1	(Germany) RB Leipzig
Silva 44'; Güler 52'; Mbappé 83'; Diomande 87'	Report	Gomis 85'

Bernabéu, Madrid
Attendance: 73,016
Referee: István Kovács (Romania)

21 October 2026
21:00

Real Betis (Spain)	1−0	(Netherlands) Feyenoord
Isco 59' (pen.)	Report

La Cartuja, Seville
Attendance: 67,524
Referee: Simone Sozza (Italy)

21 October 2026
21:00 (20:00 UTC+1)

Sporting CP (Portugal)	2−3	(Austria) LASK
Suárez 5' (pen.), 89'	Report	Lang 15'; Kalajdžić 63'; Daněk 68'

Estádio José Alvalade, Lisbon
Attendance: 48,985
Referee: Nick Walsh (Scotland)

=== Matchday 4 ===
3 November 2026
18:45 (17:45 UTC+0)

Shakhtar Donetsk (Ukraine)	0–1	(Portugal) Sporting CP
	Report	Doumbia 59'

Stamford Bridge, London, England
Attendance: 28,260
Referee: Ivan Kružliak (Slovakia)

3 November 2026
18:45 (20:45 UTC+3)

Galatasaray (Turkey)	2–0	(Germany) VfB Stuttgart
Batrakov 12', 15'	Report

Rams Park, Istanbul
Attendance: 45,162
Referee: Chris Kavanagh (England)

3 November 2026
21:00

Atlético Madrid (Spain)	0–2	(Germany) Bayern Munich
	Report	Karl 54'; Laimer 74'

Metropolitano Stadium, Madrid
Attendance: 69,821
Referee: François Letexier (France)

3 November 2026
21:00

Barcelona (Spain)	3–0	(England) Aston Villa
Yamal 7'; Raphinha 52', 64'	Report

Camp Nou, Barcelona
Attendance: 52,662
Referee: Davide Massa (Italy)

3 November 2026
21:00

Feyenoord (Netherlands)	0–3	(Italy) Inter Milan
	Report	Bisseck 8'; Esposito 34'; Zieliński 54'

De Kuip, Rotterdam
Attendance: 43,649
Referee: Glenn Nyberg (Sweden)

3 November 2026
21:00

Bodø/Glimt (Norway)	0–0	(France) Lille
	Report

Aspmyra Stadion, Bodø
Attendance: 7,737
Referee: João Pinheiro (Portugal)

3 November 2026
21:00

LASK (Austria)	4–0	(Slovakia) Slovan Bratislava
Jørgensen 19', 37'; Ljubičić 44'; Adeniran 48'	Report

Raiffeisen Arena, Linz
Attendance: 17,246
Referee: Donatas Rumšas (Lithuania)

3 November 2026
21:00 (20:00 UTC+0)

Manchester United (England)	3–2	(Italy) Roma
Fernandes 58' (pen.); Cunha 83', 86'	Report	Soulé 11'; Malen 18' (pen.)

Old Trafford, Manchester
Attendance: 73,747
Referee: Jesús Gil Manzano (Spain)

3 November 2026
21:00

Villarreal (Spain)	0–6	(France) Paris Saint-Germain
	Report	Neves 9'; Doué 12'; Mayulu 13'; Fabián 17', 50'; Boly 78'

Estadio de la Cerámica, Villarreal
Attendance: 20,036
Referee: Felix Zwayer (Germany)

4 November 2026
18:45 (19:45 UTC+2)

AEK Athens (Greece)	2–3	(Spain) Real Madrid
Koïta 12'; Pilios 75'	Report	Bellingham 32'; Mbappé 78'; Valverde 90+2'

Agia Sophia Stadium, Athens
Attendance: 30,368
Referee: Maurizio Mariani (Italy)

4 November 2026
18:45 (20:45 UTC+3)

Fenerbahçe (Turkey)	3–2	(England) Liverpool
Greenwood 29'; Brown 73'; Muriqi 79'	Report	Nyoni 25'; Isak 69'

Şükrü Saracoğlu Stadium, Istanbul
Attendance: 39,536
Referee: Clément Turpin (France)

4 November 2026
21:00

Borussia Dortmund (Germany)	2–1	(Spain) Real Betis
Silva 49'; Karetsas 72'	Report	Ruibal 67'

Westfalenstadion, Dortmund
Attendance: 81,365
Referee: Serdar Gözübüyük (Netherlands)

4 November 2026
21:00 (20:00 UTC+0)

Porto (Portugal)	4–1	(Italy) Napoli
Bednarek 11'; Veiga 71'; Kiwior 80'; Aghehowa 90' (pen.)	Report	McTominay 43'

Estádio do Dragão, Porto
Attendance: 49,190
Referee: Michael Oliver (England)

4 November 2026
21:00

PSV Eindhoven (Netherlands)	1–2	(Belgium) Club Brugge
Sano 54'	Report	Tresoldi 25'; Forbs 65'

Philips Stadion, Eindhoven
Attendance: 34,900
Referee: Irfan Peljto (Bosnia and Herzegovina)

4 November 2026
21:00

RB Leipzig (Germany)	2–3	(England) Manchester City
Baku 49'; Nusa 61'	Report	Lukeba 37' (o.g.); Fernández 58'; Haaland 78'

Red Bull Arena, Leipzig
Attendance: 45,228
Referee: Marco Guida (Italy)

4 November 2026
21:00

Lens (France)	1–9	(Italy) Como
Aguilar 65'	Report	Douvikas 7', 32', 57'; Paz 40'; Da Cunha 47'; Kempf 53'; Liberali 62'; Baturina 69'; Papaccioli 90+1'

Stade Bollaert-Delelis, Lens
Attendance: 37,417
Referee: Rohit Saggi (Norway)

4 November 2026
21:00

Slavia Prague (Czech Republic)	1–2	(England) Arsenal
Nowak 90'	Report	Madueke 9'; Gyökeres 38'

Fortuna Arena, Prague
Attendance: 19,308
Referee: Tobias Stieler (Germany)

4 November 2026
21:00

Viking (Norway)	4–1	(Azerbaijan) Sabah
Botheim 27', 90+4'; Tripić 69'; Falchener 81'	Report	Mbina 11'

Viking Stadion, Stavanger
Attendance: 15,012
Referee: Sander van der Eijk (Netherlands)

=== Matchday 5 ===
24 November 2026
18:45

Bodø/Glimt (Norway)	v	(Austria) LASK
	Report

Aspmyra Stadion, Bodø
Referee: Halil Umut Meler (Turkey)

24 November 2026
18:45 (20:45 UTC+3)

Galatasaray (Turkey)	v	(England) Aston Villa
	Report

Rams Park, Istanbul
Referee: Daniel Siebert (Germany)

24 November 2026
21:00 (20:00 UTC+0)

Arsenal (England)	v	(Germany) Borussia Dortmund
	Report

Emirates Stadium, London
Referee: Maurizio Mariani (Italy)

24 November 2026
21:00

Como (Italy)	v	(Greece) AEK Athens
	Report

Stadio Giuseppe Sinigaglia, Como
Referee: Javier Alberola Rojas (Spain)

24 November 2026
21:00

Feyenoord (Netherlands)	v	(Portugal) Porto
	Report

De Kuip, Rotterdam
Referee: Irfan Peljto (Bosnia and Herzegovina)

24 November 2026
21:00 (20:00 UTC+0)

Manchester City (England)	v	(Italy) Napoli
	Report

Etihad Stadium, Manchester
Referee: István Kovács (Romania)

24 November 2026
21:00

RB Leipzig (Germany)	v	(France) Lens
	Report

Red Bull Arena, Leipzig
Referee: Ivan Kružliak (Slovakia)

24 November 2026
21:00

Real Madrid (Spain)	v	(Netherlands) PSV Eindhoven
	Report

Bernabéu, Madrid
Referee: Espen Eskås (Norway)

24 November 2026
21:00

Slovan Bratislava (Slovakia)	v	(Spain) Real Betis
	Report

Tehelné pole, Bratislava
Referee: Jérôme Brisard (France)

25 November 2026
18:45 (21:45 UTC+4)

Sabah (Azerbaijan)	v	(Spain) Barcelona
	Report

Olympic Stadium, Baku

25 November 2026
18:45

Slavia Prague (Czech Republic)	v	(Spain) Villarreal
	Report

Fortuna Arena, Prague

25 November 2026
21:00

Atlético Madrid (Spain)	v	(Norway) Viking
	Report

Metropolitano Stadium, Madrid

25 November 2026
21:00

Club Brugge (Belgium)	v	(England) Liverpool
	Report

Jan Breydel Stadium, Bruges

25 November 2026
21:00

Inter Milan (Italy)	v	(Germany) VfB Stuttgart
	Report

San Siro, Milan

25 November 2026
21:00 (20:00 UTC+0)

Shakhtar Donetsk (Ukraine)	v	(Turkey) Fenerbahçe
	Report

Stamford Bridge, London, England

25 November 2026
21:00

Lille (France)	v	(Germany) Bayern Munich
	Report

Stade Pierre-Mauroy, Villeneuve-d'Ascq

25 November 2026
21:00

Paris Saint-Germain (France)	v	(Italy) Roma
	Report

Parc des Princes, Paris

25 November 2026
21:00 (20:00 UTC+0)

Sporting CP (Portugal)	v	(England) Manchester United
	Report

Estádio José Alvalade, Lisbon

=== Matchday 6 ===
8 December 2026
18:45

Viking (Norway)	v	(Netherlands) Feyenoord
	Report

Viking Stadion, Stavanger

8 December 2026
18:45

Villarreal (Spain)	v	(Azerbaijan) Sabah
	Report

Estadio de la Cerámica, Villarreal

8 December 2026
21:00 (22:00 UTC+2)

AEK Athens (Greece)	v	(Turkey) Galatasaray
	Report

Agia Sophia Stadium, Athens

8 December 2026
21:00

Roma (Italy)	v	(Portugal) Sporting CP
	Report

Stadio Olimpico, Rome

8 December 2026
21:00 (20:00 UTC+0)

Aston Villa (England)	v	(France) Paris Saint-Germain
	Report

Villa Park, Birmingham

8 December 2026
21:00

Barcelona (Spain)	v	(England) Manchester City
	Report

Camp Nou, Barcelona

8 December 2026
21:00

Bayern Munich (Germany)	v	(Czech Republic) Slavia Prague
	Report

Allianz Arena, Munich

8 December 2026
21:00 (20:00 UTC+0)

Manchester United (England)	v	(Germany) RB Leipzig
	Report

Old Trafford, Manchester

8 December 2026
21:00

Napoli (Italy)	v	(Belgium) Club Brugge
	Report

Stadio Diego Armando Maradona, Naples

9 December 2026
18:45

Real Betis (Spain)	v	(Italy) Como
	Report

La Cartuja, Seville

9 December 2026
18:45

Slovan Bratislava (Slovakia)	v	(Ukraine) Shakhtar Donetsk
	Report

Tehelné pole, Bratislava

9 December 2026
21:00 (20:00 UTC+0)

Arsenal (England)	v	(Spain) Real Madrid
	Report

Emirates Stadium, London

9 December 2026
21:00

Borussia Dortmund (Germany)	v	(Italy) Inter Milan
	Report

Westfalenstadion, Dortmund

9 December 2026
21:00

LASK (Austria)	v	(Turkey) Fenerbahçe
	Report

Raiffeisen Arena, Linz

9 December 2026
21:00 (20:00 UTC+0)

Liverpool (England)	v	(Portugal) Porto
	Report

Anfield, Liverpool

9 December 2026
21:00

PSV Eindhoven (Netherlands)	v	(Spain) Atlético Madrid
	Report

Philips Stadion, Eindhoven

9 December 2026
21:00

Lens (France)	v	(Norway) Bodø/Glimt
	Report

Stade Bollaert-Delelis, Lens

9 December 2026
21:00

VfB Stuttgart (Germany)	v	(France) Lille
	Report

MHPArena, Stuttgart

=== Matchday 7 ===
19 January 2027
18:45

Bodø/Glimt (Norway)	v	(Spain) Atlético Madrid
	Report

Aspmyra Stadion, Bodø

19 January 2027
18:45 (20:45 UTC+3)

Galatasaray (Turkey)	v	(Netherlands) Feyenoord
	Report

Rams Park, Istanbul

19 January 2027
21:00 (22:00 UTC+2)

AEK Athens (Greece)	v	(Italy) Roma
	Report

Agia Sophia Stadium, Athens

19 January 2027
21:00 (20:00 UTC+0)

Aston Villa (England)	v	(Germany) Borussia Dortmund
	Report

Villa Park, Birmingham

19 January 2027
21:00

Inter Milan (Italy)	v	(England) Liverpool
	Report

San Siro, Milan

19 January 2027
21:00 (20:00 UTC+0)

Porto (Portugal)	v	(Czech Republic) Slavia Prague
	Report

Estádio do Dragão, Porto

19 January 2027
21:00

Lille (France)	v	(Slovakia) Slovan Bratislava
	Report

Stade Pierre-Mauroy, Villeneuve-d'Ascq

19 January 2027
21:00

Real Madrid (Spain)	v	(Austria) LASK
	Report

Bernabéu, Madrid

19 January 2027
21:00

VfB Stuttgart (Germany)	v	(Belgium) Club Brugge
	Report

MHPArena, Stuttgart

20 January 2027
18:45 (20:45 UTC+3)

Fenerbahçe (Turkey)	v	(Spain) Villarreal
	Report

Şükrü Saracoğlu Stadium, Istanbul

20 January 2027
18:45 (21:45 UTC+4)

Sabah (Azerbaijan)	v	(Italy) Napoli
	Report

Olympic Stadium, Baku

20 January 2027
21:00

Como (Italy)	v	(France) Paris Saint-Germain
	Report

Stadio Giuseppe Sinigaglia, Como

20 January 2027
21:00 (20:00 UTC+0)

Manchester United (England)	v	(Germany) Bayern Munich
	Report

Old Trafford, Manchester

20 January 2027
21:00

RB Leipzig (Germany)	v	(Ukraine) Shakhtar Donetsk
	Report

Red Bull Arena, Leipzig

20 January 2027
21:00

Lens (France)	v	(England) Manchester City
	Report

Stade Bollaert-Delelis, Lens

20 January 2027
21:00

Real Betis (Spain)	v	(England) Arsenal
	Report

La Cartuja, Seville

20 January 2027
21:00 (20:00 UTC+0)

Sporting CP (Portugal)	v	(Spain) Barcelona
	Report

Estádio José Alvalade, Lisbon

20 January 2027
21:00

Viking (Norway)	v	(Netherlands) PSV Eindhoven
	Report

Viking Stadion, Stavanger

=== Matchday 8 ===
27 January 2027
21:00 (20:00 UTC+0)

Arsenal (England)	v	(Azerbaijan) Sabah
	Report

Emirates Stadium, London

27 January 2027
21:00

Roma (Italy)	v	(France) Lille
	Report

Stadio Olimpico, Rome

27 January 2027
21:00

Atlético Madrid (Spain)	v	(Turkey) Fenerbahçe
	Report

Metropolitano Stadium, Madrid

27 January 2027
21:00

Borussia Dortmund (Germany)	v	(Greece) AEK Athens
	Report

Westfalenstadion, Dortmund

27 January 2027
21:00

Club Brugge (Belgium)	v	(Norway) Bodø/Glimt
	Report

Jan Breydel Stadium, Bruges

27 January 2027
21:00

Bayern Munich (Germany)	v	(Spain) Real Betis
	Report

Allianz Arena, Munich

27 January 2027
21:00

Barcelona (Spain)	v	(Italy) Como
	Report

Camp Nou, Barcelona

27 January 2027
21:00 (20:00 UTC+0)

Shakhtar Donetsk (Ukraine)	v	(Spain) Real Madrid
	Report

Stamford Bridge, London, England

27 January 2027
21:00

Feyenoord (Netherlands)	v	(Germany) RB Leipzig
	Report

De Kuip, Rotterdam

27 January 2027
21:00

LASK (Austria)	v	(Portugal) Porto
	Report

Raiffeisen Arena, Linz

27 January 2027
21:00 (20:00 UTC+0)

Liverpool (England)	v	(France) Lens
	Report

Anfield, Liverpool

27 January 2027
21:00 (20:00 UTC+0)

Manchester City (England)	v	(Portugal) Sporting CP
	Report

Etihad Stadium, Manchester

27 January 2027
21:00

Paris Saint-Germain (France)	v	(Turkey) Galatasaray
	Report

Parc des Princes, Paris

27 January 2027
21:00

PSV Eindhoven (Netherlands)	v	(Germany) VfB Stuttgart
	Report

Philips Stadion, Eindhoven

27 January 2027
21:00

Slavia Prague (Czech Republic)	v	(England) Aston Villa
	Report

Fortuna Arena, Prague

27 January 2027
21:00

Napoli (Italy)	v	(Norway) Viking
	Report

Stadio Diego Armando Maradona, Naples

27 January 2027
21:00

Villarreal (Spain)	v	(England) Manchester United
	Report

Estadio de la Cerámica, Villarreal

27 January 2027
21:00

Slovan Bratislava (Slovakia)	v	(Italy) Inter Milan
	Report

Tehelné pole, Bratislava
