= 2026–27 Como 1907 season =

Association football team season page

Como 1907
2026–27 season
- Owner: Djarum Group
- President: Mirwan Suwarso
- Head coach: Cesc Fàbregas
- Stadium: Stadio Giuseppe Sinigaglia
- Serie A: 5th
- Coppa Italia: Round of 16
- UEFA Champions League: League phase
- Top goalscorer: League: Anastasios Douvikas (5); All: Anastasios Douvikas (11)
- Highest home attendance: 12,415 vs Roma; 11 October 2026, Serie A
- Lowest home attendance: 10,198 vs RB Leipzig; 10 September 2026, Champions League
- Biggest win: 9–1 vs Lens (A); 4 November 2026, Champions League
- Biggest defeat: 0–2 vs Frosinone (A); 20 September 2026, Serie A 0–2 vs Internazionale (A); 8 November 2026, Serie A
Home colours	Away colours	Third colours
- All statistics correct as of 8 November 2026.

The 2026–27 season is Como 1907's 120th season in existence, and third consecutive season in Serie A. In addition to the domestic league, Como is participating in this season's editions of the Coppa Italia and, for the first time in club history, the UEFA Champions League. The season covers the period from 1 July 2026 to 30 June 2027.

On 4 November 2026, Como won 9–1 away against Lens in the Champions League league phase, setting the record for most Champions League goals scored by a team in an away match, and equalling the record for largest victory, as well as becoming the biggest win by an Italian team.

== Players ==
=== First-team squad ===
As of 1 September 2026

Note: Flags indicate national team as has been defined under FIFA eligibility rules. some limited exceptions apply. Players may hold more than one non-FIFA nationality.

No.	Player	Nat.	Position	Date of birth (age)	Signed in	Signed from	Contract ends	Transfer fee
Goalkeepers
1	Jean Butez	(France)	GK	8 June 1995 (age 31)	2025	(Belgium) Antwerp	2028	€2.10m
22	Mauro Vigorito	(Italy)	GK	22 May 1990 (age 36)	2022	(Italy) Cosenza	2027	Free
97	Robert Sánchez	(Spain)	GK	18 November 1997 (age 29)	2026	(England) Chelsea	2027	Loan
Defenders
2	Marc-Oliver Kempf	(Germany)	CB / DM	28 January 1995 (age 31)	2024	(Germany) Hertha BSC	2029	€2.50m
3	Álex Valle	(Spain)	LB / LWB	25 April 2004 (age 22)	2025	(Spain) Barcelona	2029	€6.00m
4	Jacobo Ramón	(Spain)	CB	6 January 2005 (age 21)	2025	(Spain) Real Madrid	2030	€2.50m
13	Alberto Dossena	(Italy)	CB	13 October 1998 (age 28)	2024	(Italy) Cagliari	2028	€9.34m
16	Kaiki Bruno	(Brazil)	LB	8 March 2003 (age 23)	2026	(Brazil) Cruzeiro	2027	Loan
18	Edoardo Goldaniga	(Italy)	CB	2 November 1993 (age 33)	2024	(Italy) Cagliari	2028	€750k
27	Yan Couto	(Brazil)	RB / RWB / RM	3 June 2002 (age 24)	2026	(Germany) Borussia Dortmund	2027	Loan
28	Ivan Smolčić	(Croatia)	RB / CB	17 August 2000 (age 26)	2025	(Croatia) Rijeka	2029	€1.60m
53	Willy Kambwala	(Democratic Republic of the Congo)	CB / RB	25 August 2004 (age 22)	2026	(Spain) Villarreal	2027	Loan
99	Trevoh Chalobah	(England)	CB / RB / DM	5 July 1999 (age 27)	2026	(England) Chelsea	2031	€30.00m
Midfielders
5	Máximo Perrone	(Argentina)	DM / CM	7 January 2003 (age 23)	2024	(England) Manchester City	2029	€13.00m
6	Luis Milla	(Spain)	CM / DM / AM	7 October 1994 (age 32)	2026	(Spain) Getafe	2029	€6.00m
7	Lucas Da Cunha	(France)	CM / AM / LW	9 June 2001 (age 25)	2023	(France) Nice	2029	€400k
8	Maxence Caqueret	(France)	CM / DM / AM	15 February 2000 (age 26)	2025	(France) Lyon	2029	€15.00m
10	Nico Paz	(Argentina)	AM / CM / ST	8 September 2004 (age 22)	2024	(Spain) Real Madrid	2028	€6.00m
15	Adrian Lahdo	(Sweden)	CM	26 December 2007 (age 18)	2026	(Sweden) Hammarby IF	2031	€12.00m
20	Martin Baturina	(Croatia)	AM / CM	16 February 2003 (age 23)	2025	(Croatia) Dinamo Zagreb	2030	€18.00m
21	Samuele Ricci	(Italy)	DM / CM	21 August 2001 (age 25)	2026	(Italy) Milan	2027	Loan
30	Mattia Liberali	(Italy)	AM / RW / LW	6 April 2007 (age 19)	2026	(Italy) Catanzaro	2031	€6.00m
Forwards
9	Anastasios Douvikas	(Greece)	ST	2 August 1999 (age 27)	2025	(Spain) Celta Vigo	2029	€14.00m
11	Assane Diao	(Senegal)	LW / ST / RW	7 September 2005 (age 21)	2025	(Spain) Real Betis	2029	€12.00m
17	Jesús Rodríguez	(Spain)	LW / RW	21 November 2005 (age 21)	2025	(Spain) Real Betis	2030	€22.50m
42	Jayden Addai	(Netherlands)	RW / LW	26 August 2005 (age 21)	2025	(Netherlands) AZ	2030	€14.00m
90	Moise Kean	(Italy)	ST / RW / LW	28 February 2000 (age 26)	2026	(Italy) Fiorentina	2027	Loan

== Transfers ==
=== Summer window ===
Deals officialised beforehand were effective starting from 1 July 2026.

==== In ====
Date	Pos.	Player	Age	Moving from	Fee	Notes	Source
15 June 2026	MF	(Hungary) Levente Bősze	17	(Slovakia) Dunajská Streda	€800,000	From loan to definitive purchase	
1 July 2026	FW	(Spain) Álvaro Morata	33	(Italy) AC Milan	€12,000,000	From loan to definitive purchase	
2 July 2026	MF	(Spain) Luis Milla	31	(Spain) Getafe	€6,000,000		
15 July 2026	MF	(Italy) Mattia Liberali	19	(Italy) Catanzaro	€6,000,000		
17 July 2026	DF	(Spain) Andrés Cuenca	19	(Spain) Barcelona	€500,000		
9 August 2026	DF	(England) Trevoh Chalobah	27	(England) Chelsea	€30,000,000		

==== Loan returns ====
Date	Pos.	Player	Age	Moving from	Fee	Notes	Source
30 June 2026	DF	(Italy) Alberto Dossena	27	(Italy) Cagliari			

==== Loans in ====
Date	Pos.	Player	Age	Moving from	Fee	Notes	Source
2 July 2026	DF	(Brazil) Kaiki Bruno	23	(Brazil) Cruzeiro	Undisclosed	With obligation to buy	
6 August 2026	DF	(Brazil) Yan Couto	24	(Germany) Borussia Dortmund	€3,000,000	With option to buy	
26 August 2026	DF	(Democratic Republic of the Congo) Willy Kambwala	22	(Spain) Villarreal	Undisclosed	With option to buy	
29 August 2026	MF	(Italy) Samuele Ricci	25	(Italy) AC Milan	€1,500,000	With option to buy	
1 September 2026	FW	(Italy) Moise Kean	26	(Italy) Fiorentina	€5,000,000	With obligation to buy	
1 September 2026	GK	(Spain) Robert Sánchez	28	(England) Chelsea	Free		

Total spending: €64M ▼

==== Out ====
Date	Pos.	Player	Age	Moving to	Fee	Notes	Source
8 May 2026	MF	(Ivory Coast) Ben Lhassine Kone	26	(Italy) Frosinone	€1,300,000	From loan to definitive purchase	
8 May 2026	FW	(Italy) Patrick Cutrone	28	(Italy) Monza	€4,000,000	From loan to definitive purchase	
30 June 2026	DF	(Spain) Alberto Moreno	33	(Spain) Mallorca	Free	End of contract	
30 June 2026	MF	(Spain) Sergi Roberto	34	(United States) LA Galaxy	Free	End of contract	
4 July 2026	DF	(Italy) Tommaso Cassandro	26	(Italy) Palermo	€1,500,000	After return from loan	
8 July 2026	MF	(Italy) Giuseppe Mazzaglia	20	(Italy) Folgore Caratese	Undisclosed	After return from loan	
11 July 2026	DF	(Italy) Tommaso Nucifero	20	(Italy) Giana Erminio	Undisclosed	From loan to definitive purchase	
18 July 2026	MF	(Germany) Yannik Engelhardt	25	(Germany) SC Freiburg	€7,000,000	After return from loan	
18 July 2026	DF	(Kosovo) Mërgim Vojvoda	31	(Italy) Udinese	€1,500,000		
26 July 2026	FW	(Italy) Thomas Diego Altomonte	19	(Italy) Club Milano	Undisclosed	After return from loan	
12 August 2026	DF	(Austria) Stefan Posch	29	(Germany) Mainz 05	€4,000,000	From loan to definitive purchase	
18 August 2026	FW	(Iraq) Ali Jasim	22	(Iraq) Zakho	€650,000	After return from loan	
25 August 2026	FW	(Italy) Tommaso Fumagalli	26	(Italy) Inter Milan U23	Undisclosed	After return from loan	
1 September 2026	MF	(Austria) Matthias Braunöder	24	(Italy) Carrarese	Undisclosed	After return from loan	
2 September 2026	MF	(Italy) Luca Mazzitelli	30	(Italy) Palermo	Free	Contract termination	
2 September 2026	FW	(Austria) Marlon Mustapha	25	(Germany) SGV Heilbronn-Freiberg	Free	Contract termination	

==== Loans ended ====
Date	Pos.	Player	Age	Moving to	Fee	Notes	Source
30 June 2026	GK	(Croatia) Nikola Čavlina	24	(Croatia) Dinamo Zagreb			
30 June 2026	GK	(Brazil) Henrique Menke	19	(Brazil) Internacional			
30 June 2026	DF	(Brazil) Diego Carlos	33	(Turkey) Fenerbahçe			

==== Loans out ====
Date	Pos.	Player	Age	Moving to	Fee	Notes	Source
4 July 2026	FW	(Italy) Federico Chinetti	20	(Italy) Mantova	Free	After return from loan	
14 July 2026	DF	(Italy) Fellipe Jack	20	(Italy) Cremonese	Free	After return from loan	
27 July 2026	MF	(Italy) Jacopo Simonetta	20	(Italy) Vado	Free	After return from loan	
29 July 2026	FW	(Latvia) Kristiāns Mežsargs	20	(Italy) Folgore Caratese	Free	From Primavera squad	
14 August 2026	MF	(France) Andréa Le Borgne	20	(Italy) Hellas Verona	Free	After return from loan	
18 August 2026	MF	(Italy) Fabio Rispoli	19	(Italy) Südtirol	Free	After return from loan	
18 August 2026	DF	(Spain) Andrés Cuenca	19	(Spain) Sporting Gijón	Free		
21 August 2026	MF	(The Gambia) Alieu Fadera	24	(Italy) Cagliari	€500,000	After return from loan	
28 August 2026	FW	(Spain) Álvaro Morata	33	(Spain) Leganés	Free		
29 August 2026	FW	(Italy) Alessandro Gabrielloni	32	(Italy) Palermo	Free	After return from loan	
30 August 2026	DF	(Belgium) Ignace Van Der Brempt	24	(Italy) Sassuolo	Free	With conditional obligation to buy	
31 August 2026	GK	(Sweden) Noel Törnqvist	24	(Italy) Monza	Free		
1 September 2026	FW	(Germany) Nicolas Kühn	26	(Germany) Borussia Mönchengladbach	Free		
1 September 2026	FW	(Spain) Iván Azón	23	(Spain) Getafe	Free	After return from loan	
1 September 2026	GK	(Indonesia) Emil Audero	29	(Spain) Rayo Vallecano	Free	After return from loan	

Total income: €20.45M ▲
Net spend: €43.55M ▼

=== Winter window ===
Deals officialised beforehand will be effective starting from 2 January 2027.

==== In ====
Date	Pos.	Player	Age	Moving from	Fee	Notes	Source

==== Loans returns ====
Date	Pos.	Player	Age	Moving from	Fee	Notes	Source

Total spending:

==== Out ====
Date	Pos.	Player	Age	Moving to	Fee	Notes	Source

==== Loans out ====
Date	Pos.	Player	Age	Moving to	Fee	Notes	Source

Total income: ▲
Net spend:

== Pre-season and friendlies ==
Win Draw Loss Fixtures

24 July 2026 Friendly	Como (Italy)	2–2	(France) Paris FC	Como, Italy
20:30 CEST (UTC+2)	Gabrielloni 25'; Douvikas 86'	Report	Pagis 30', 50'	Stadium: Stadio Giuseppe Sinigaglia; Attendance: 0
Note: The match was played behind closed doors, in three periods of 30 minutes each.

29 July 2026 Como Cup	Como (Italy)	3–1	(Saudi Arabia) Al-Ula	Como, Italy
20:30 CEST (UTC+2)	Cuenca 34'; Azón 39'; Gabrielloni 44'	Report	Quioto 6'	Stadium: Stadio Giuseppe Sinigaglia
Note: The match was 45 minutes long.

29 July 2026 Como Cup	Como (Italy)	1–1 (1–3 p)	(Spain) Villarreal	Como, Italy
22:00 CEST (UTC+2)	Liberali 27'	Report	Moleiro 30'	Stadium: Stadio Giuseppe Sinigaglia
	Penalties
	Da Cunha (penalty missed); Douvikas (penalty scored)		(penalty scored) Gerard; (penalty scored) Moleiro; (penalty scored) Mikautadze
Note: The match was 45 minutes long.

31 July 2026 Como Cup	Como (Italy)	3–2	(Portugal) Famalicão	Como, Italy
18:00	Diao 11'; Douvikas 7', 36'	Report	Koutsias 3'; Jangéal 79'	Stadium: Stadio Giuseppe Sinigaglia

12 August 2026 Friendly	Arsenal (England)	1–1 (4–3 p)	(Italy) Como	London, England
19:30 BST (UTC+1)	Lewis-Skelly 33'	Report	Baturina 43'	Stadium: Emirates Stadium; Referee: Paul Tierney (England)
	Penalties
	Ødegaard (penalty scored); Havertz (penalty scored); Bruno Guimarães (penalty scored); Madueke (penalty missed); Tzolis (penalty scored)		(penalty scored) Milla; (penalty scored) Caqueret; (penalty missed) Smolčić; (penalty scored) Rodríguez; (penalty missed) Morata

16 August 2026 Friendly	Liverpool (England)	0–0	(Italy) Como	Liverpool, England
12:30 CEST (UTC+2)		Report		Stadium: Anfield
Note: The match was played behind closed doors, in two periods of 35 minutes each.

16 August 2026 Friendly	Liverpool (England)	2–0	(Italy) Como	Liverpool, England
19:30 CEST (UTC+2)	Gakpo 23'; Jacquet 44'; Koumas (yellow card) 68'; Szoboszlai (yellow card) 71'	Report	Couto (yellow card) 71'	Stadium: Anfield; Attendance: 59,800; Referee: Robert Jones (England)

== Competitions ==
=== Overall record ===
Competition	First match	Last match	Starting round	Final position	Record							
Competition	First match	Last match	Starting round	Final position	Pld	W	D	L	GF	GA	GD	Win %
Serie A	22 August 2026	May 2027	Matchday 1	TBD	11	7	2	2	18	10	+8	63.64
Coppa Italia	2 December 2026	TBD	Round of 16	TBD	0	0	0	0	0	0	+0	—
UEFA Champions League	10 September 2026	TBD	League phase	TBD	4	3	0	1	19	6	+13	75.00
Total					15	10	2	3	37	16	+21	66.67

Last updated: 8 November 2026
Source: Soccerway

=== Serie A ===
==== League table ====
Pos	Team	Pld	W	D	L	GF	GA	GD	Pts	Qualification or relegation
2	Inter Milan	11	9	1	1	28	13	+15	28	Qualification for the Champions League league phase
3	Roma	11	8	3	0	31	10	+21	27	Qualification for the Champions League league phase
4	Como	12	8	2	2	20	10	+10	26	Qualification for the Champions League league phase
5	AC Milan	11	7	3	1	23	13	+10	24	Qualification for the Europa League league phase (Note: The winners of the 2026–27 Coppa Italia and the fifth-placed team both qualify for the Europa League league phase. If the Coppa Italia winners finish in the top five, the sixth-placed team will qualify for the Europa League league phase. If Italy are one of the two associations with the highest UEFA coefficient points, fifth place will qualify for the Champions League league phase and the other qualifying spots will move down one position.)
6	Juventus	12	6	3	3	25	12	+13	21	Qualification for the Conference League play-off round

Updated to match(es) played on 21 November 2026. Source: Serie A
Rules for classification: 1) Points; 2) Head-to-head points; 3) Head-to-head goal difference; 4) Goal difference; 5) Goals scored; 6) Drawing of lots.
End-of-season ties on points for 1st or 17th are instead decided by a one- or two-leg play-off, respectively, unless the play-off would involve a UEFA competition finalist (in which case rules 2–6 apply). Rules 2–6 determine home advantage (for 17th, the better-ranked team hosts the second leg); if three or more teams are tied, they also select the two play-off teams.

==== Results summary ====
Overall								Home						Away					
Pld	W	D	L	GF	GA	GD	Pts	W	D	L	GF	GA	GD	W	D	L	GF	GA	GD
12	8	2	2	20	10	+10	26	4	1	0	7	1	+6	4	1	2	13	9	+4

Last updated: 21 November 2026.
Source: Serie A

==== Results by round ====
Round	1	2	3	4	5	6	7	8	9	10	11	12	13	14	15	16	17	18	19	20	21	22	23	24	25	26	27	28	29	30	31	32	33	34	35	36	37	38
Ground	A	A	A	H	A	H	A	H	A	H	A	H	H	A	H	A	H	A	H	A	H	A	H	A	H	H	A	H	A	H	A	H	A	H	A	H	A	H
Result	D	W	W	W	L	D	W	W	W	W	L	W																										
Position	10	8	4	3	8	7	5	5	4	4	5																											

Updated to match(es) played on 21 November 2026. Source: Serie A
A = Away; H = Home; W = Win; D = Draw; L = Loss; P = Postponed
Notes:
- Positions show the situation at the end of the corresponding gameweeks (GW), not the position at the conclusion of matches or game days.

==== Matches ====
Win Draw Loss Fixtures

22 August 2026 1	Udinese	1–1	Como	Udine
18:30 CEST (UTC+2)	Piotrowski (yellow card) 28'; Kamara 29'; Abankwah (yellow card) 41'; Gómez (yellow card) 90+3'	Report	Douvikas 54'	Stadium: Stadio Friuli; Attendance: 23,239; Referee: Alberta Arena

30 August 2026 2	Napoli	1–2	Como	Naples
18:30 CEST (UTC+2)	Højlund 30'; Di Lorenzo (yellow card) 37'	Report	Baturina 17'; Douvikas 34'	Stadium: Stadio Diego Armando Maradona; Attendance: 45,000; Referee: Luca Pairetto

4 September 2026 3	Genoa	1–4	Como	Genoa
20:45 CEST (UTC+2)	Osmajić 19'; Sow (yellow card) 36'; Østigård (yellow card) 62'	Report	Baturina 25', (yellow card) 60'; Diao 30', 78'; Paz 40'	Stadium: Stadio Luigi Ferraris; Attendance: 30,102; Referee: Marco Guida

14 September 2026 4	Como	2–1	Parma	Como
18:30 CEST (UTC+2)	Ramón 23'; Caqueret (yellow card) 76'; Kaiki 83'	Report	Romero 90+2'	Stadium: Stadio Giuseppe Sinigaglia; Attendance: 10,211; Referee: Giuseppe Mucera

20 September 2026 5	Frosinone	2–0	Como	Frosinone
15:00 CEST (UTC+2)	Calò 14'; Kvernadze (yellow card) 45+1', (goal) 45+3'; Bracaglia (yellow card) 56'; Raimondo (yellow card) 90+2'	Report	Couto (yellow card) 34'; Diao (yellow card) 90+5'	Stadium: Stadio Benito Stirpe; Attendance: 14,525; Referee: Daniele Chiffi

11 October 2026 6	Como	0–0	Roma	Como
12:30 CEST (UTC+2)	Diao (yellow card) 45+2'; Baturina (yellow card) 90'	Report	De Roon (yellow card) 46'; Malen (red card) 53'; Koné (yellow card) 57'; Soulé (yellow card) 62'	Stadium: Stadio Giuseppe Sinigaglia; Attendance: 12,415; Referee: Michael Fabbri

18 October 2026 7	Fiorentina	1–3	Como	Florence
15:00 CEST (UTC+2)	Pongračić 42'; Ndour (yellow card) 68'; Mastantuono (yellow card) 74'	Report	Valle (yellow card) 28'; Liberali 32'; Paz 36', (yellow card) 39'; Ramón (yellow card) 45+3'; Douvikas 57'	Stadium: Stadio Artemio Franchi; Attendance: 21,873; Referee: Marco Di Bello

24 October 2026 8	Como	2–0	Sassuolo	Como
15:00 CEST (UTC+2)	Douvikas 49', 60'; Couto (yellow card) 65'; Milla (yellow card) 90+1'	Report	Berardi (yellow card) 63'; Van Der Brempt (yellow card) 87'	Stadium: Stadio Giuseppe Sinigaglia; Attendance: 11,383; Referee: Davide Di Marco

27 October 2026 9	Torino	1–3	Como	Turin
20:45 CET (UTC+1)	Adams 24'; Belghali (yellow card) 72'	Report	Ramón 81'; Paz 87'; Baturina 90+2'	Stadium: Stadio Olimpico Grande Torino; Attendance: 6,415; Referee: Giuseppe Collu

1 November 2026 10	Como	1–0	Venezia	Como
12:30 CET (UTC+1)	Da Cunha 43' (pen.); Kaiki (yellow card) 86'	Report	Sohm (yellow card) 39'; Juan Jesus (yellow card) 41'	Stadium: Stadio Giuseppe Sinigaglia; Attendance: 11,892; Referee: Maria Sole Ferrieri Caputi

8 November 2026 11	Internazionale	2–0	Como	Milan
18:00 CET (UTC+1)	Esposito 12', (yellow card) 72'; Thuram 19'	Report		Stadium: San Siro; Attendance: 77,593; Referee: Daniele Chiffi

21 November 2026 12	Como	2–0	Cagliari	Como
15:00 CET (UTC+1)	Ramón 24'; Da Cunha 56'	Report		Stadium: Stadio Giuseppe Sinigaglia; Referee: Andrea Calzavara

=== Coppa Italia ===
Win Draw Loss Fixtures

2 December 2026 Round of 16	Como	v	Cremonese	Como
21:00 CET (UTC+1)		Report		Stadium: Stadio Giuseppe Sinigaglia

=== UEFA Champions League ===
==== League phase ====
The draw for the league phase was held on 27 August 2026.

Pos	Team	Pld	W	D	L	GF	GA	GD	Pts	Qualification
2	(Spain) Real Madrid	4	4	0	0	13	7	+6	12	Advance to round of 16 (seeded)
3	(England) Arsenal	4	3	1	0	8	3	+5	10	Advance to round of 16 (seeded)
4	(Italy) Como	4	3	0	1	19	6	+13	9	Advance to round of 16 (seeded)
5	(Spain) Barcelona	4	3	0	1	14	6	+8	9	Advance to round of 16 (seeded)
6	(England) Aston Villa	4	3	0	1	12	6	+6	9	Advance to round of 16 (seeded)

Updated to match(es) played on 4 November 2026. Source: UEFA
Rules for classification: League phase tiebreakers

Round	1	2	3	4	5	6	7	8
Ground	H	A	H	A	H	A	H	A
Result	W	L	W	W				
Position	5	12	9	4				

Updated to match(es) played on 4 November 2026. Source: UEFA
A = Away; H = Home; W = Win; D = Draw; L = Loss

10 September 2026 1	Como (Italy)	4–1	(Germany) RB Leipzig	Como, Italy
21:00 CEST (UTC+2)	Baturina 15'; Douvikas 38'; Paz (yellow card) 47'; Diao 54'; Perrone 90', (yellow card) 90+4'	Report	Orbán (yellow card) 2'; Nkunku (yellow card) 24'; Maksimović 58'; Banzuzi (yellow card) 64'	Stadium: Stadio Giuseppe Sinigaglia; Attendance: 10,198; Referee: Serdar Gözübüyük (Netherlands)

14 October 2026 2	Feyenoord (Netherlands)	3–2	(Italy) Como	Rotterdam, Netherlands
18:45 CEST (UTC+2)	Zechiël 20'; Diarra (yellow card) 50'; Hadj Moussa 52'; Sánchez 81' (o.g.); Read (yellow card) 84'	Report	Diao 18'; Smolčić (yellow card) 57'; Ramón (yellow card) 69'; Da Cunha (yellow card) 74'; Douvikas 90+3'	Stadium: De Kuip; Attendance: 43,951; Referee: Donatas Rumšas (Lithuania)

21 October 2026 3	Como (Italy)	4–1	(England) Manchester United	Como, Italy
18:45 CEST (UTC+2)	Paz 2', 57'; Douvikas 49'; Ramón 76'; Kempf (yellow card) 84'	Report	Santos (yellow card) 25'; Baleba (yellow card) 51'; Lacey (yellow card) 86'; Zirkzee 90+1'	Stadium: Stadio Giuseppe Sinigaglia; Attendance: 10,875; Referee: Sven Jablonski (Germany)

4 November 2026 4	Lens (France)	1–9	(Italy) Como	Lens, France
21:00 CET (UTC+1)	Baidoo (yellow card) 34'; Aguilar 65'; Cuisance (yellow card) 75'	Report	Douvikas 7', 32', 57'; Paz 40'; Da Cunha 47'; Kempf 53'; Liberali 62'; Baturina 69'; Papaccioli 90+1'	Stadium: Stade Bollaert-Delelis; Attendance: 37,417; Referee: Rohit Saggi (Norway)

24 November 2026 5	Como (Italy)	v	(Greece) AEK Athens	Como, Italy
21:00 CET (UTC+1)		Report		Stadium: Stadio Giuseppe Sinigaglia

9 December 2026 6	Real Betis (Spain)	v	(Italy) Como	Seville, Spain
18:45 CET (UTC+1)		Report		Stadium: La Cartuja
Note: The match will be played at La Cartuja in Seville, instead of Real Betis' regular stadium, Benito Villamarín, due to renovation works.

20 January 2027 7	Como (Italy)	v	(France) Paris Saint-Germain	Como, Italy
21:00 CET (UTC+1)		Report		Stadium: Stadio Giuseppe Sinigaglia

27 January 2027 8	Barcelona (Spain)	v	(Italy) Como	Barcelona, Spain
21:00 CET (UTC+1)		Report		Stadium: Camp Nou

== Statistics ==
=== Appearances and goals ===
As of 21 November 2026

No.	Pos	Nat	Player	Total		Serie A		Coppa Italia		Champions League	
No.	Pos	Nat	Player	Apps	Goals	Apps	Goals	Apps	Goals	Apps	Goals
Goalkeepers
1	GK	(France) FRA	Jean Butez	12	0	9	0	0	0	3	0
22	GK	(Italy) ITA	Mauro Vigorito	0	0	0	0	0	0	0	0
97	GK	(Spain) ESP	Robert Sánchez	4	0	3	0	0	0	1	0
Defenders
2	DF	(Germany) GER	Marc-Oliver Kempf	11	1	6+2	0	0	0	2+1	1
3	DF	(Spain) ESP	Álex Valle	13	0	7+2	0	0	0	4	0
4	DF	(Spain) ESP	Jacobo Ramón	16	4	10+2	3	0	0	4	1
13	DF	(Italy) ITA	Alberto Dossena	1	0	0	0	0	0	0+1	0
16	DF	(Brazil) BRA	Kaiki Bruno	13	1	5+5	1	0	0	2+1	0
18	DF	(Italy) ITA	Edoardo Goldaniga	0	0	0	0	0	0	0	0
27	DF	(Brazil) BRA	Yan Couto	15	0	11	0	0	0	3+1	0
28	DF	(Croatia) CRO	Ivan Smolčić	12	0	1+7	0	0	0	1+3	0
53	DF	(Democratic Republic of the Congo) COD	Willy Kambwala	2	0	1+1	0	0	0	0	0
99	DF	(England) ENG	Trevoh Chalobah	8	0	6	0	0	0	2	0
Midfielders
5	MF	(Argentina) ARG	Máximo Perrone	16	1	7+5	0	0	0	3+1	1
6	MF	(Spain) ESP	Luis Milla	16	0	8+4	0	0	0	4	0
7	MF	(France) FRA	Lucas Da Cunha	16	3	11+1	2	0	0	3+1	1
8	MF	(France) FRA	Maxence Caqueret	12	0	4+6	0	0	0	1+1	0
10	MF	(Argentina) ARG	Nico Paz	15	6	10+1	3	0	0	4	3
14	MF	(Italy) ITA	Samuele Ricci	12	0	3+6	0	0	0	0+3	0
15	MF	(Sweden) SWE	Adrian Lahdo	2	0	0+2	0	0	0	0	0
20	MF	(Croatia) CRO	Martin Baturina	16	5	10+2	3	0	0	3+1	2
30	MF	(Italy) ITA	Mattia Liberali	8	2	2+4	1	0	0	0+2	1
54	MF	(Italy) ITA	Matteo Papaccioli	1	1	0	0	0	0	0+1	1
Forwards
9	FW	(Greece) GRE	Anastasios Douvikas	16	11	11+1	5	0	0	3+1	6
11	FW	(Senegal) SEN	Assane Diao	8	4	5+1	2	0	0	2	2
17	FW	(Spain) ESP	Jesús Rodríguez	5	0	1+3	0	0	0	0+1	0
42	FW	(Netherlands) NED	Jayden Addai	3	0	0+3	0	0	0	0	0
90	FW	(Italy) ITA	Moise Kean	4	0	1+2	0	0	0	0+1	0
Players transferred out during the season
12	GK	(Indonesia) IDN	Emil Audero	0	0	0	0	0	0	0	0
21	GK	(Sweden) SWE	Noel Törnqvist	0	0	0	0	0	0	0	0
23	FW	(Spain) ESP	Álvaro Morata	0	0	0	0	0	0	0	0

=== Goalscorers ===
As of 21 November 2026

Players in italics left the team during the season.

Rank	No.	Pos.	Nat.	Player	Serie A	Coppa Italia	Champions League	Total
1	9	FW	(Greece)	Anastasios Douvikas	5	0	6	11
2	10	MF	(Argentina)	Nico Paz	3	0	3	6
3	20	MF	(Croatia)	Martin Baturina	3	0	2	5
4	4	DF	(Spain)	Jacobo Ramón	3	0	1	4
4	11	FW	(Senegal)	Assane Diao	2	0	2	4
6	7	MF	(France)	Lucas Da Cunha	2	0	1	3
7	30	DF	(Italy)	Mattia Liberali	1	0	1	2
8	2	DF	(Germany)	Marc-Oliver Kempf	0	0	1	1
8	5	MF	(Argentina)	Maximo Perrone	0	0	1	1
8	16	DF	(Brazil)	Bruno Kaiki	1	0	0	1
8	54	DF	(Italy)	Matteo Papaccioli	0	0	1	1
Totals					20	0	19	39

=== Clean sheets ===
As of 21 November 2026

Players in italics left the team during the season.

Rank	No.	Pos.	Nat.	Player	Serie A	Coppa Italia	Champions League	Total
1	1	GK	(France)	Jean Butez	4	0	0	4
Totals					4	0	0	4
