= Anastasios Douvikas =

Greek footballer (born 1999)

Tasos Douvikas
- Douvikas in 2022

Personal information
- Full name: Anastasios Douvikas
- Date of birth: 2 August 1999 (age 27)
- Place of birth: Athens, Greece
- Height: 1.87 m (6 ft 2 in)
- Position: Striker

Team information
- Current team: Como
- Number: 9

Youth career
- 2008–2015: Aristeas Argous
- 2015–2017: Asteras Tripolis

Senior career*
Years	Team	Apps	(Gls)
2017–2020	Asteras Tripolis	40	(2)
2020–2021	Volos	30	(11)
2021–2023	Utrecht	68	(28)
2023–2025	Celta Vigo	52	(10)
2025–	Como	63	(21)

International career^{‡}
2017–2018	Greece U19	10	(7)
2019–2020	Greece U21	7	(0)
2021–	Greece	24	(3)
- * Club domestic league appearances and goals as of 14:54, 21 November 2026 (UTC) ‡ National team caps and goals as of 2 October 2026

Anastasios "Tasos" Douvikas (Greek: Αναστάσιος "Τάσος" Δουβίκας; Athens, 2 August 1999) is a Greek professional footballer who plays as a striker for Serie A club Como and the Greece national team.

== Club career ==
=== Asteras Tripolis ===
Douvikas made his professional debut on 19 August 2017, in a 2–1 home loss against PAS Giannina, coming in as a substitute. On 26 October, he scored his first professional goal in a 2–1 home win against AO Chania Kissamikos in the 2017–18 Greek Cup. On 26 November, he scored in a 2–0 home win against Levadiakos, thus contributing to the team's third successive win. On 2 December, he scored in a comfortable 4–0 home win against Platanias, helping his team maintain its form.

On 18 December 2018, Douvikas scored in a 4–0 away win against Apollon Paralimnio in the 2018–19 Greek Cup, ending a lengthy drought.

=== Volos ===
On 10 August 2020, Douvikas signed with Volos on a free transfer. In his debut, he scored the opener in a 2–0 away win against Atromitos. On 5 October 2020, Douvikas scored a brace, sealing a 2–1 away win against Lamia. On 31 October 2020, he scored in the late stages of a home game against Larissa, salvaging a point for his team with the final 1–1 draw. On 30 November 2020, Douvikas scored a goal and marked his team's comeback in a 3–3 away draw against Apollon Smyrnis, despite going down by three goals early in the second half.

On 17 January 2021, Douvikas scored with a nice volley in a 1–1 home draw against Lamia. The following week, he scored helping to 1–0 away win against PAS Giannina. His excellent goal scoring streak continued in the Greek Cup with goals in away matches against OFI and AEK Athens, before scoring in a 2–1 away win against OFI once again, this time for the league and a 2–0 home win against Apollon Smyrnis.

=== Utrecht ===
On 23 April 2021, Utrecht officially announced the signing of the talented striker on a four-year contract for a fee that exceeded €1,000,000. In his first statement as an Utrecht player, Douvikas expressed his happiness for the transfer and his eagerness to meet the fans. On 15 August 2021, Douvikas celebrated his first official goal wearing the Utrecht jersey and scored the 3–0 for his club in the first game of the Eredivisie where the hosts emphatically celebrated the victory with a 4–0 against Sparta Rotterdam. On 19 September 2021, he scored with a penalty kick in a 2–2 home draw game against RKC Waalwijk.

A week later he scored again with a penalty kick in a 5–1 home win against PEC Zwolle, a historical goal because he was Utrecht's No. 2,500 in Eredivisie. On 23 January 2022, Douvikas scored after four months for Utrecht, in a 3–0 away win match against Sparta Rotterdam for Eredivisie. The Greek striker last scored on 25 September and since then 28 goalless finals have followed in the league, when he opened the score after Sander van de Streek's assist. On 5 February 2022, he scored a brace after two assists from Mimoun Mahi, and gave an assist to Henk Veerman, helping Utrecht come back from a 2–0 deficit to win 3–2 at home against SC Cambuur. He was voted man of the match for his performance. In the 2022–23 season, he became top scorer in the Dutch League with 19 goals, along with Xavi Simons.

=== Celta Vigo ===
On 28 August 2023, Douvikas signed a five-year contract with Celta Vigo in Spain for €12 million. A month later, on 23 September, he scored his first goal in a 3–2 away defeat against Barcelona. He made 58 appearances for the club across all competitions, scoring 18 goals and providing 4 assists.

=== Como ===
On 3 February 2025, Douvikas joined Como in Italy on a four-and-a-half-year contract for €13 million. A month later, on 29 March, he netted his first goal in a 1–1 draw with Empoli. On 6 January 2026, he scored his first brace for the club in a 3–0 away win against Pisa. Later that year, on 10 May, he scored the decisive goal in a 1–0 away victory over Hellas Verona, securing his club's first-ever qualification for European competitions. Later that month, on 24 May, he scored in a 4–1 away victory over Cremonese, helping his club secure qualification for the UEFA Champions League. Later that year, on 10 September, he scored his first Champions League goal in a 4–1 win over RB Leipzig.

== International career ==
On 24 March 2021, Douvikas was called up to the Greece senior team by coach John van 't Schip for the 2022 FIFA World Cup qualifiers against Spain and Georgia. On 28 March 2021, he made his debut with the national team as a substitute in a friendly against Honduras.

== Personal life ==
Douvikas family is from Argolis, where he grew up. His father, Giannis, is a former professional footballer, who also is a trainer.

== Career statistics ==
=== Club ===
As of match played 21 November 2026

Appearances and goals by club, season and competition
Club	Season	League			National cup (Note: Includes Greek Cup, KNVB Cup, Copa del Rey, Coppa Italia)		Europe		Other		Total	
Club	Season	Division	Apps	Goals	Apps	Goals	Apps	Goals	Apps	Goals	Apps	Goals
Asteras Tripolis	2017–18	Super League Greece	20	2	3	1	—		—		23	3
Asteras Tripolis	2018–19	Super League Greece	18	0	7	1	1 (Note: Appearance in UEFA Europa League)	0	—		26	1
Asteras Tripolis	2019–20	Super League Greece	2	0	1	0	—		—		3	0
Asteras Tripolis	Total		40	2	11	2	1	0	—		52	4
Volos	2020–21	Super League Greece	30	11	4	3	—		—		34	14
Utrecht	2021–22	Eredivisie	34	9	1	1	—		2 (Note: Appearances in Eredivisie European play-offs)	0	37	10
Utrecht	2022–23	Eredivisie	32	19	4	2	—		2	1	38	22
Utrecht	2023–24	Eredivisie	2	0	—		—		—		2	0
Utrecht	Total		68	28	5	3	—		4	1	77	32
Celta Vigo	2023–24	La Liga	32	7	5	6	—		—		37	13
Celta Vigo	2024–25	La Liga	20	3	1	2	—		—		21	5
Celta Vigo	Total		52	10	6	8	—		—		58	18
Como	2024–25	Serie A	13	2	—		—		—		13	2
Como	2025–26	Serie A	38	14	6	3	—		—		44	17
Como	2026–27	Serie A	12	5	0	0	4 (Note: Appearances in UEFA Champions League)	6	—		16	11
Como	Total		63	21	6	3	4	6	—		73	30
Career total			253	72	32	19	5	6	4	1	294	98

=== International ===
As of match played 1 October 2026

Appearances and goals by national team and year
National team	Year	Apps	Goals
Greece	2021	7	1
Greece	2022	8	0
Greece	2023	0	0
Greece	2024	3	0
Greece	2025	1	1
Greece	2026	5	1
Total		24	3

Scores and results list Greece's goal tally first, score column indicates score after each Douvikas goal.

List of international goals scored by Anastasios Douvikas
No.	Date	Venue	Opponent	Score	Result	Competition
1	5 September 2021	Fadil Vokrri Stadium, Pristina, Kosovo	Kosovo	1–0	1–1	2022 FIFA World Cup qualification
2	7 June 2025	Pankritio Stadium, Heraklion, Greece	Slovakia	3–1	4–1	Friendly
3	24 September 2026	Red Star Stadium, Belgrade, Serbia	Serbia	2–1	2–1	2026–27 UEFA Nations League A

== Honours ==
Individual

- Super League Greece Young Player of the Season: 2017–18
- Super League Greece Team of the Season: 2020–21
- Volos Player of the Season: 2020–21
- Eredivisie Team of the Month: January 2023, May 2023
- Eredivisie top scorer: 2022–23
- Best Greek Player playing Abroad: 2022–23
- Copa del Rey top scorer: 2023–24
