= Assane Diao =

Senegalese footballer (born 2005)

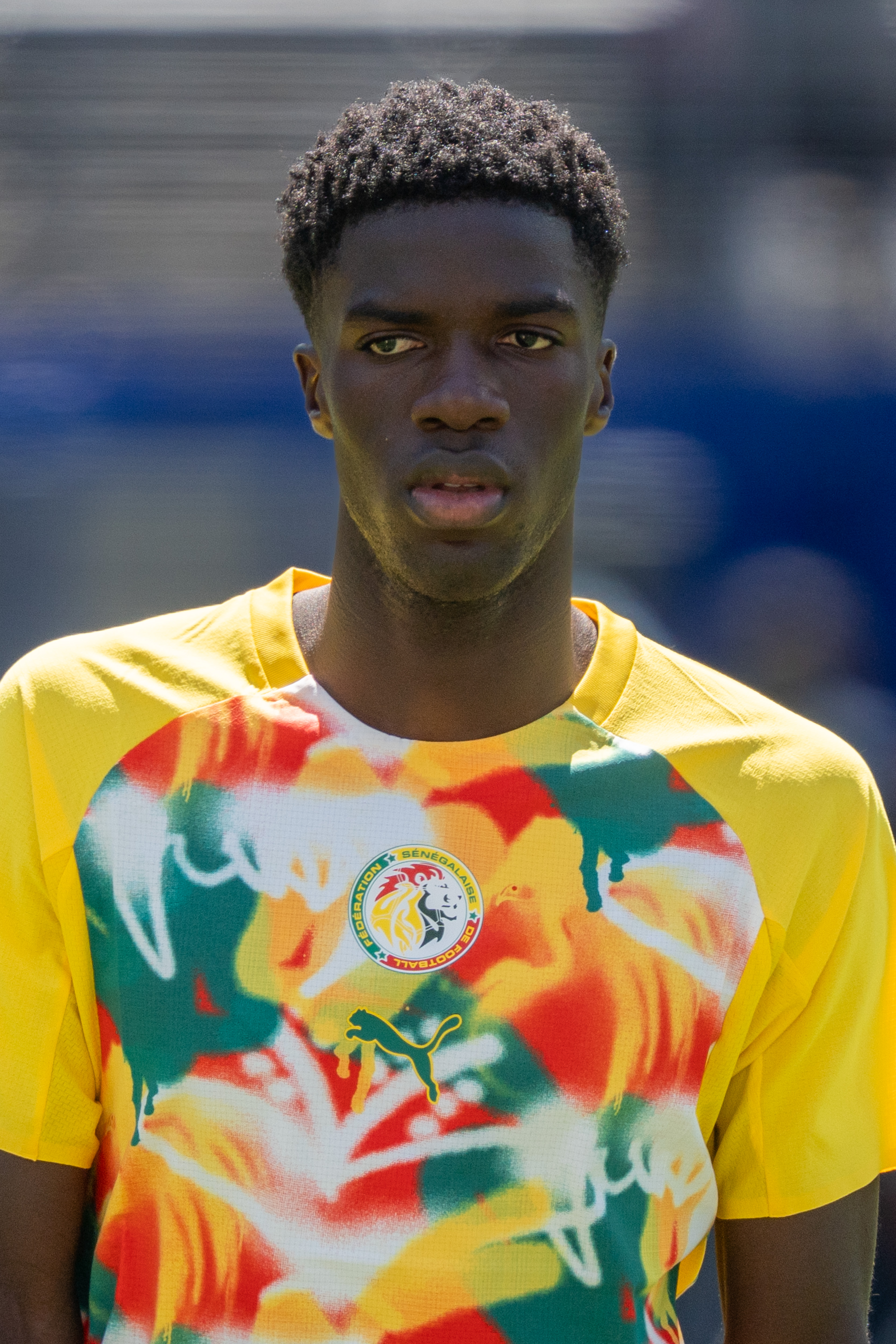
- Diao with Senegal in 2026

Personal information
- Full name: Assane Diao Diaoune
- Date of birth: 7 September 2005 (age 21)
- Place of birth: Ndangane, Senegal
- Height: 1.85 m (6 ft 1 in)
- Position: Left winger

Team information
- Current team: Como
- Number: 11

Youth career
- Badajoz
- 2019–2020: Flecha Negra
- 2020–2021: Balón de Cádiz
- 2021–2022: Betis

Senior career*
| Years | Team | Apps | (Gls) |
| 2022–2023 | Betis B | 25 | (6) |
| 2023–2025 | Betis | 28 | (3) |
| 2025– | Como | 38 | (12) |

International career^{‡}
| 2023 | Spain U18 | 2 | (2) |
| 2023–2024 | Spain U19 | 11 | (1) |
| 2023 | Spain U21 | 4 | (0) |
| 2025– | Senegal | 9 | (0) |
Medal record
Men's football
Representing Spain
UEFA European Under-19 Championship
| Winner | 2024 Northern Ireland |
- * Club domestic league appearances and goals as of 15:03, 15 October 2026 (UTC) ‡ National team caps and goals as of 4 October 2026

Assane Diao Diaoune (born 7 September 2005) is a Senegalese professional footballer who plays as a left winger for Serie A club Como and the Senegal national team.

== Club career ==
=== Betis ===
Diao is a youth product of Badajoz, Flecha Negra and Balón de Cádiz, before moving to the youth academy of Real Betis in 2021, on a contract until 2024. Originally a midfielder, his attacking skills led to him being molded into a left winger, and he started playing with the reserves in the Segunda Federación in 2022.

On 26 July 2023, Diao extended his contract with the club until 2027. He made his senior and professional debut with the Verdiblancos as a late substitute in a 1–0 Europa League loss to Rangers on 21 September 2023. Later that month, on 28 September, he scored his first goal on his La Liga debut in a 1–1 away draw against Granada. A week later, on 5 October, he netted his first goal in European competitions in a 2–1 victory over Sparta Prague. On 7 December, after coming on as a substitute, he scored his second La Liga goal, a 90+4' equalizer in a 2-2 draw against FC Barcelona.

=== Como ===
On 7 January 2025, Betis announced Diao's transfer to Serie A side Como 1907. The fee was reported at around €12 million. On 23 February 2025, Diao scored a 77th minute goal vs Napoli to secure a 2–1 win vs the league leaders. As a result, Inter Milan overtook Napoli in the table.

== International career ==
Born in Senegal, Diao moved to Spain at the age of three and has dual citizenship. He played for the nation's under-19 team at the 2023 UEFA European Under-19 Championship.

On 19 March 2025, Diao's request to switch international allegiance to Senegal was approved by FIFA.

On 21 May 2026, Diao was selected by Senegal's coach Pape Thiaw in the 26-man squad for the 2026 FIFA World Cup.

== Style of play ==
Originally a midfielder, Diao is a strong, and powerful winger who excels at crossing the ball. Primarily right-footed, he is strong with both feet. He has a powerful technique, and strong heading ability.

== Personal life ==
Diao has a twin brother, Ousseynou, who is also a youth footballer in Spain.

== Career statistics ==
=== Club ===
As of match played 14 October 2026

Appearances and goals by club, season and competition
| Club | Season | League | | | National cup (Note: Includes Copa del Rey, Coppa Italia) | | Europe | | Total | |
| Club | Season | Division | Apps | Goals | Apps | Goals | Apps | Goals | Apps | Goals |
|---|---|---|---|---|---|---|---|---|---|---|
| Betis B | 2022–23 | Segunda Federación | 20 | 4 | — | | — | | 20 | 4 |
| Betis B | 2023–24 | Segunda Federación | 5 | 2 | — | | — | | 5 | 2 |
| Betis B | Total | | 25 | 6 | — | | — | | 25 | 6 |
| Betis | 2023–24 | La Liga | 18 | 2 | 3 | 1 | 7 (Note: Five appearances in UEFA Europa League, two appearances in UEFA Europa Conference League) | 1 | 28 | 4 |
| Betis | 2024–25 | La Liga | 10 | 1 | 1 | 1 | 8 (Note: Appearances in UEFA Conference League) | 0 | 19 | 2 |
| Betis | Total | | 28 | 3 | 4 | 2 | 15 | 1 | 47 | 6 |
| Como | 2024–25 | Serie A | 15 | 8 | — | | — | | 15 | 8 |
| Como | 2025–26 | Serie A | 17 | 2 | 3 | 0 | — | | 20 | 2 |
| Como | 2026–27 | Serie A | 6 | 2 | 0 | 0 | 2 (Note: Appearances in UEFA Champions League) | 2 | 8 | 4 |
| Como | Total | | 38 | 12 | 3 | 0 | 2 | 2 | 43 | 14 |
| Career total | | | 91 | 21 | 7 | 2 | 17 | 3 | 115 | 26 |

== Honours ==
Spain U19

- UEFA European Under-19 Championship: 2024
