= Lucas Da Cunha =

French footballer (born 2001)

Personal information
- Date of birth: 9 June 2001 (age 25)
- Place of birth: Roanne, France
- Height: 1.74 m (5 ft 9 in)
- Position: Midfielder

Team information
- Current team: Como
- Number: 7

Youth career
- 2007–2010: Roanne Matel SFC
- 2010–2016: Roannais Foot 42 Jugend
- 2016–2019: Rennes

Senior career*
Years	Team	Apps	(Gls)
2018–2020	Rennes B	19	(4)
2019–2020	Rennes	2	(0)
2020–2023	Nice	10	(0)
2020–2021	→ Lausanne-Sport (loan)	27	(6)
2022	→ Clermont (loan)	15	(2)
2023–	Como	131	(19)

International career^{‡}
2017	France U16	6	(3)
2017–2018	France U17	11	(3)
2018–2019	France U18	10	(2)
2019	France U19	4	(0)
2026–	France	5	(0)
- * Club domestic league appearances and goals as of 14:53, 1 November 2026 (UTC) ‡ National team caps and goals as of 22:22, 15 November 2026 (UTC)

Lucas Da Cunha (born 9 June 2001) is a French professional footballer who plays as a central midfielder for Serie A club Como, which he captains, and the France national team.

Da Cunha was born in Roanne and was turned down by several clubs as a boy before he joined the academy of Rennes. He won national titles with the club's under-17 and under-19 sides and made five first-team appearances. He joined Nice in 2020 and spent most of his time there on loan at Lausanne-Sport and Clermont. Da Cunha moved to Serie B club Como in January 2023. Cesc Fàbregas converted him from a winger into a central midfielder. He helped Como win promotion to Serie A in 2024 and became captain in 2025. He scored twice on the final day of the 2025–26 season as Como qualified for the UEFA Champions League for the first time.

Da Cunha played for France from under-16 to under-19 level. He is also eligible to play for Portugal through his father. Zinedine Zidane gave him his first senior call-up in September 2026, and he made his debut against Belgium later that month.

== Early life and career ==
Da Cunha was born on 9 June 2001 in Roanne, Loire. His father is Portuguese. He grew up as a supporter of Saint-Étienne. He joined the local club Roannais Foot 42 in 2010. Saint-Étienne turned him down around ten times over three or four years. Lyon rejected him after six trials. At a youth selection for Dijon, he finished 16th when the club took 15 players.

== Club career ==
=== Rennes ===
Da Cunha came through the Rennes academy as a winger alongside Eduardo Camavinga and Georginio Rutter. He signed his first professional contract with the club in December 2017. He was part of the Rennes generation that won the Championnat National U17 in the 2017–18 season. Rennes beat Toulouse 2–0 in the final.

On 2 June 2019, Da Cunha scored a hat-trick in the final of the Championnat National U19. Rennes beat Montpellier 4–0 despite playing the last hour with ten men. The title qualified the club for the UEFA Youth League.

Da Cunha made his first-team debut on 28 November 2019. He replaced Rafik Guitane in the 65th minute of a 3–1 UEFA Europa League defeat away to Celtic. He made his Ligue 1 debut on 4 February 2020. He came on for Flavien Tait in the 83rd minute of a 1–0 defeat away to Lille. He made five first-team appearances for Rennes. Two came in Ligue 1, two in the Europa League and one in the Coupe de la Ligue. Goal reported that coach Julien Stéphan gave him little playing time, and he turned down a contract extension in search of regular first-team football.

=== Nice and loans ===
On 30 September 2020, Da Cunha signed for Nice. The club loaned him to Lausanne-Sport for the 2020–21 season. He arrived in Switzerland in October 2020 and was used mainly as a substitute at first. He started on the right wing. He was later moved into a number 10 role behind the strikers when Lausanne switched to a 3–5–2 formation.

Da Cunha scored his first Super League goal in March 2021. He came off the bench to score in a 3–0 win over Vaduz. Seventeen days later, he opened the scoring in a 4–3 home win over St. Gallen. On 3 April, he scored both goals in a 2–1 win over Luzern. His first was a shot from around 25 metres in the 31st minute. He scored again on 18 April in a 2–1 home win over Vaduz. He also scored in a derby against Servette. He chipped the goalkeeper after a one-two with Evann Guessand. He finished the season with 28 appearances, six goals and one assist.

Da Cunha returned to Nice for the 2021–22 season under Christophe Galtier. He made ten appearances for Nice in the first half of the season. He provided an assist in a 3–0 win away to Saint-Étienne on 25 September 2021. On 17 January 2022, Nice loaned him to Clermont until the end of the season. The loan did not include an option to buy. He made 15 Ligue 1 appearances for Clermont and scored two goals, as the club avoided relegation.

A loan move to Lorient with an option to buy collapsed on the final day of the 2022 summer transfer window. Media reported that a computer fault stopped the contract from being sent in time. Da Cunha did not make a competitive appearance for Nice in the first half of the 2022–23 season. He left the club with 11 appearances and one assist.

=== Como ===
On 16 January 2023, Da Cunha joined Serie B club Como for a reported fee of €500,000. He signed a contract until June 2026. Como were fighting relegation at the time. Da Cunha later said that Fàbregas, then a Como player, took him under his wing when he arrived.

Da Cunha scored his first goal for Como on 1 April 2023, opening the scoring in a 3–2 defeat away to Venezia. On 13 May, he came on at half-time against Ternana. With the score at 1–1, he scored from a free kick to put Como ahead. Como won 3–1 and secured their place in Serie B.

Fàbregas later became Como's coach. He moved Da Cunha from the wing into a defensive midfield role. Como finished second in the 2023–24 season and returned to Serie A after 21 years.

Da Cunha scored his first Serie A goal on 7 November 2024, converting a pass from Nico Paz in the 17th minute away to Genoa. Genoa equalised in stoppage time and the match finished 1–1. In March 2025, Fàbregas said he would like a team of eleven players like Da Cunha. Da Cunha was appointed club captain in September 2025.

On 24 May 2026, the final day of the 2025–26 season, Da Cunha scored his first Serie A brace in a 4–1 win away to Cremonese. Como finished fourth and qualified for the Champions League for the first time. In July 2026, he extended his contract until 2031.

Da Cunha made his Champions League debut in the 2026–27 season. On 4 November 2026, he scored his first Champions League goal in a historic 9–1 win away to Lens. His goal made it 4–0 and came from a pass by Paz. The eight-goal margin equalled the record for the modern Champions League.

== International career ==
Born in France, Da Cunha holds French and Portuguese nationality. He represented France at under-16, under-17, under-18 and under-19 level. He made his under-16 debut in a 2–2 draw with Poland on 21 March 2017. He won six caps and scored three goals at that level. He won 11 caps and scored three goals for the under-17s. He added ten caps and two goals for the under-18s and four caps for the under-19s. For a long time, Da Cunha did not rule out playing for Portugal.

Zidane named Da Cunha in his first squad as France coach on 18 September 2026. The squad was selected for four Nations League matches against Turkey, Belgium and Italy. He was one of five uncapped players in the squad. He did not play in the opening match against Turkey on 25 September.

Da Cunha made his debut on 28 September 2026 in a 1–0 win away to Belgium. He started in midfield and was replaced by Manu Koné in the 90th minute. He hit the post with a shot during the match. He, Jérémy Jacquet and Andy Diouf all started on their debuts. It was the first time three players had debuted in the same France starting line-up since 11 August 2010. Zidane told TF1 after the match that Da Cunha was "not a discovery" for him. He added that he was very happy with his performance.

Da Cunha started again in a 1–1 draw with Italy at the Stade de France on 2 October. In the 68th minute, he failed to control a pass from Adrien Rabiot and Alessandro Bastoni scored Italy's equaliser. Zidane declined to blame him. He said the whole team shared responsibility when a mistake happened. Da Cunha came off the bench in a 4–1 home win over Belgium on 5 October. He was named in the squad for the Nations League matches against Italy on 12 November and Turkey on 15 November 2026.

== Style of play ==
Da Cunha trained as a winger at Rennes. At Como, Fàbregas moved him into central midfield. AFP described him in that role as both a ball-winner and a creator. Da Cunha said that Fàbregas had played "a hugely important role" in his development. Trivela reported that he ranked among the Serie A leaders for accurate passes, passes leading to shots and long balls in the 2025–26 season.

Zidane said Da Cunha was "not afraid to play". He praised his ability to thread passes and switch play over long distances. In November 2026, Zidane told Téléfoot that Da Cunha was "a player who makes his team play". He said Da Cunha "shines" through his positioning.

== Career statistics ==
=== Club ===
As of match played 4 November 2026

Appearances and goals by club, season and competition
Club	Season	League			National cup (Note: Includes Swiss Cup, Coupe de France, Coppa Italia)		League cup (Note: Includes Coupe de la Ligue)		Europe		Total	
Club	Season	Division	Apps	Goals	Apps	Goals	Apps	Goals	Apps	Goals	Apps	Goals
Rennes II	2017–18	Championnat National 2	2	0	—		—		—		2	0
Rennes II	2018–19	Championnat National 3	9	1	—		—		—		9	1
Rennes II	2019–20	Championnat National 3	7	3	—		—		—		7	3
Rennes II	2020–21	Championnat National 3	1	0	—		—		—		1	0
Rennes II	Total		19	4	—		—		—		19	4
Rennes	2019–20	Ligue 1	2	0	0	0	1	0	2 (Note: Appearances in UEFA Europa League)	0	5	0
Lausanne-Sport (loan)	2020–21	Swiss Super League	27	6	1	0	—		—		28	6
Nice	2021–22	Ligue 1	10	0	1	0	—		—		11	0
Nice	2022–23	Ligue 1	0	0	0	0	—		0	0	0	0
Nice	Total		10	0	1	0	—		0	0	11	0
Clermont (loan)	2021–22	Ligue 1	15	2	—		—		—		15	2
Como	2022–23	Serie B	14	2	—		—		—		14	2
Como	2023–24	Serie B	35	7	1	0	—		—		36	7
Como	2024–25	Serie A	36	3	1	0	—		—		37	3
Como	2025–26	Serie A	36	6	5	1	—		—		41	7
Como	2026–27	Serie A	10	1	0	0	—		4 (Note: Appearances in UEFA Champions League)	1	14	2
Como	Total		131	19	7	1	—		4	1	142	21
Career total			205	26	8	0	3	0	4	1	220	33

=== International ===
As of match played 15 November 2026

Appearances and goals by national team and year
National team	Year	Apps	Goals
France	2026	5	0
Total		5	0

== Honours ==
Rennes U19

- Championnat National U19: 2018–19

Nice

- Coupe de France runner-up: 2021–22

== See also ==
- List of French international footballers
