= Matteo Papaccioli =

Italian footballer

Personal information
- Birth name: Matteo Oliveira Papaccioli
- Date of birth: 9 May 2008 (age 18)
- Place of birth: Taubaté, Brazil
- Height: 1.75 m (5 ft 9 in)
- Position: Midfielder

Team information
- Current team: Como
- Number: 54

Youth career
- Taubaté
- Sporting Pallavicino
- 2021–2022: Faloppiese Ronago
- 2022–2026: Como Primavera

Senior career*
Years	Team	Apps	(Gls)
2026–	Como	1	(1)

International career^{‡}
2024	Italy U16	3	(0)
2024–2025	Italy U17	7	(0)
2025–2026	Italy U18	3	(0)
- * Club domestic league appearances and goals as of 01:48, 5 November 2026 (UTC) ‡ National team caps and goals as of 01:48, 5 November 2026 (UTC)

Matteo Oliveira Papaccioli (born 9 May 2008) is a professional footballer who plays as a midfielder for Serie A club Como. Born in Brazil, he represents Italy at youth level.

== Club career ==
Papaccioli began playing futsal in his hometown in Taubaté, Brazil before moving to Italy with his family. In Italy he played for the youth clubs Sporting Pallavicino and Faloppiese Ronago, before joining Como's academy in 2022. In October 2024, he signed his first professional contract with Como.

Papaccioli was first called up to Como's matchday squad for a Coppa Italia match against Sassuolo in September 2025, under manager Cesc Fàbregas. In October 2026 he was called up for the first time for a Serie A match, away to Torino.

On 4 November 2026, Papaccioli made his senior debut as a substitute in a UEFA Champions League match against Lens. He scored Como's ninth goal in a 9–1 win, becoming the youngest scorer in the club's Champions League history.

== International career ==
Papaccioli was born in Taubaté, Brazil, and holds Italian and Brazilian nationality. He received his first call-up to the Italy U16s in February 2024.

== Career statistics ==
=== Club ===
As of match played 4 November 2026

Appearances and goals by club, season and competition
Club	Season	League			National cup		Europe		Total	
Club	Season	Division	Apps	Goals	Apps	Goals	Apps	Goals	Apps	Goals
Como	2026–27	Serie A	0	0	0	0	1 (Note: Appearance in UEFA Champions League)	1	1	1
Career total			0	0	0	0	1	1	1	1
