= Jacobo Ramón =

Spanish footballer (born 2005)

Personal information
- Full name: Jacobo Ramón Naveros
- Date of birth: 6 January 2005 (age 21)
- Place of birth: Madrid, Spain
- Height: 1.95 m (6 ft 5 in)
- Position: Centre-back

Team information
- Current team: Como
- Number: 4

Youth career
- 2012–2013: Las Rozas
- 2013–2024: Real Madrid

Senior career*
Years	Team	Apps	(Gls)
2023–2024	Real Madrid C	4	(0)
2023–2025	Real Madrid B	21	(4)
2025	Real Madrid	3	(1)
2025–	Como	44	(5)

International career^{‡}
2022–2023	Spain U18	7	(0)
2024	Spain U19	5	(0)
2025–	Spain U21	3	(0)
Medal record
Men's football
Representing Spain
UEFA European Under-19 Championship
Winner	2024 Northern Ireland
- * Club domestic league appearances and goals as of 22:18, 21 November 2026 (UTC) ‡ National team caps and goals as of 19:15, 15 November 2025 (UTC)

Jacobo Ramón Naveros (born 6 January 2005) is a Spanish professional footballer who plays as a centre-back for Serie A club Como.

== Club career ==
=== Real Madrid ===
As a youth player, Ramón joined the youth academy of La Liga side Real Madrid, helping the club win the league. On 1 July 2024, Ramón was officially promoted to Real Madrid Castilla from the youth system, joining the reserve team of Real Madrid.

On 22 January 2025, he made his professional debut with the senior Real Madrid team as a substitute in a 5–1 UEFA Champions League victory against Red Bull Salzburg. Later that year, on 4 May, he made his La Liga debut in a 3–2 victory over Celta Vigo. Ten days later, on 14 May, he scored his first goal for Real Madrid against Mallorca in a league game to seal a 2–1 win in the 95th minute of stoppage time.

=== Como ===
On 31 July 2025, Como announced the signing of Ramón from Real Madrid for €2.5 million, with Madrid retaining a 50% sell-on clause and three unknown buy-back clauses.

== International career ==
Ramón is a youth international for Spain, having played for Spain U19 at the 2024 UEFA European Under-19 Championship. He later won the tournament as Spain defeated France by 2–1 in the final.

In August 2025, Ramón received his first call-up to the Spain U21 for the 2027 UEFA European Under-21 Championship qualification matches against Cyprus and Kosovo.

== Style of play ==
Ramón mainly operates as a defender and is known for his speed.

== Personal life ==
Ramón is a native of Madrid, Spain.

== Career statistics ==
As of match played 21 November 2026

Appearances and goals by club, season and competition
Club	Season	League			National cup (Note: Includes Copa del Rey, Coppa Italia)		Europe		Other		Total	
Club	Season	Division	Apps	Goals	Apps	Goals	Apps	Goals	Apps	Goals	Apps	Goals
Real Madrid C	2023–24	Tercera Federación	4	0	—		—		—		4	0
Real Madrid Castilla	2023–24	Primera Federación	6	0	—		—		—		6	0
Real Madrid Castilla	2024–25	Primera Federación	15	4	—		—		—		15	4
Real Madrid Castilla	Total		21	4	—		—		—		21	4
Real Madrid	2024–25	La Liga	3	1	1	0	1 (Note: Appearance(s) in UEFA Champions League)	0	1 (Note: Appearance in FIFA Club World Cup)	0	6	1
Como	2025–26	Serie A	32	2	5	0	—		—		37	2
Como	2026–27	Serie A	12	3	0	0	4	1	—		16	4
Como	Total		44	5	5	0	4	1	—		53	6
Career total			72	10	6	0	5	1	1	0	84	11

== Honours ==
Real Madrid

- UEFA Super Cup: 2024

Spain U19

- UEFA European Under-19 Championship: 2024

Individual

- EA Sports FC Serie A Team of the Season: 2025–26
