= 2012–13 Serie B =

Italian football league season

Serie B
- Season: 2012–13
- Champions: Sassuolo (1st title)
- Promoted: Sassuolo; Hellas Verona; Livorno (by Play-off)
- Relegated: Vicenza; Ascoli; Pro Vercelli; Grosseto
- Matches: 451
- Goals: 1,149 (2.55 per match)
- Top goalscorer: Daniele Cacia (24 goals)
- Biggest home win: Brescia 5–0 Crotone; Sassuolo 5–0 Cesena
- Biggest away win: Spezia 0–6 Novara
- Highest scoring: Cittadella 2–6 Novara
- Longest winning run: 5 games Livorno; Sassuolo
- Longest unbeaten run: 12 games Livorno
- Longest winless run: 9 games Empoli; Spezia
- Longest losing run: 6 games Novara

The 2012–13 Serie B (known as the Serie bwin for sponsorship reasons) is the 81st season since its establishment in 1929. A total of 22 teams will contest the league: 16 of which returning from the 2011–12 season, 4 of which promoted from Lega Pro Prima Divisione, and two relegated from Serie A. Puma replaced Nike as manufacturer of the official Serie B match ball, a relationship that continues today.

The league featured two clubs relegated from Serie A: Novara returned to the second division after only a single season in the top flight, whereas Cesena were relegated after a two-year stint.

Four teams were promoted from Lega Pro Prima Divisione, one of them returning to Serie B after a significant absence and one of them will play Serie B for the first time in their history, Pro Vercelli after 64 years, Ternana after 6 years, while Spezia will take part to Serie B after 4 years. The fourth promoted team, Virtus Lanciano will make debut in Serie B.

Grosseto and Lecce were provisionally, not yet enforceable, condemned to relegation to Lega Pro Prima Divisione, due to a large match fixing scandal involving Italian football; both clubs appealed the decision to the Italian Football Federation's Court of Justice. In appeal, Grosseto was acquitted from all charges and readmitted to Serie B, whereas Lecce's relegation was confirmed. Lecce already announced its intention to appeal the decision at the TNAS (National Sports Arbitration Court, at the Italian Olympic Committee level), but not blocking the relegation being immediately enforceable. On 23 August 2012, FIGC officially communicated that Vicenza were to replace Lecce, and there has been a possibility of extending the transfer window as regards Grosseto and Vicenza.

== Changes from last season ==
=== Team changes ===
==== From Serie B ====
Promoted to Serie A

- Pescara
- Torino
- Sampdoria

Relegated to Lega Pro Prima Divisione

- AlbinoLeffe
- Gubbio
- Nocerina

==== To Serie B ====
Relegated from Serie A

- Novara
- Cesena

Promoted from Lega Pro Prima Divisione (Girone A)

- Ternana
- Pro Vercelli

Promoted from Lega Pro Prima Divisione (Girone B)

- Spezia
- Virtus Lanciano

== Teams ==
=== Stadia and locations ===
Location of teams in Serie B 2012–13

Team	Home city	Stadium	Capacity	2011–12 season
Ascoli	Ascoli Piceno	Cino e Lillo Del Duca	20,550	15th in the Serie B
Bari	Bari	San Nicola	58,270	13th in the Serie B
Brescia	Brescia	Mario Rigamonti	23,486	8th in the Serie B
Cesena	Cesena	Dino Manuzzi	23,860	20th in the Serie A
Cittadella	Cittadella	Pier Cesare Tombolato	7,623	16th in the Serie B
Crotone	Crotone	Ezio Scida	9,631	11th in the Serie B
Empoli	Empoli	Carlo Castellani	19,795	18th in the Serie B
Grosseto	Grosseto	Carlo Zecchini	9,909	14th in the Serie B
Hellas Verona	Verona	Marc'Antonio Bentegodi	38,402	4th in the Serie B
Juve Stabia	Castellammare di Stabia	Romeo Menti	7,642	9th in the Serie B
Livorno	Livorno	Armando Picchi	19,238	17th in the Serie B
Modena	Modena	Alberto Braglia	21,151	12th in the Serie B
Novara	Novara	Silvio Piola	17,875	19th in the Serie A
Padova	Padua	Euganeo	18,060	7th in the Serie B
Pro Vercelli	Vercelli	Silvio Piola	8,000	The Prima Divisione/A play-off winners
Reggina	Reggio Calabria	Oreste Granillo	27,454	10th in the Serie B
Sassuolo	Sassuolo (playing in Modena)	Alberto Braglia	21,151	3rd in the Serie B
Spezia	La Spezia	Alberto Picco	10,000	The Prima Divisione/B Champions
Ternana	Terni	Libero Liberati	22,000	The Prima Divisione/A Champions
Varese	Varese	Franco Ossola	8,213	5th in Serie B
Vicenza	Vicenza	Romeo Menti	12,200	19th in the Serie B
Virtus Lanciano	Lanciano	Guido Biondi	5,553	The Prima Divisione/B play-off winners

=== Personnel and kits ===
Team	President	Manager	Kit manufacturer	Shirt sponsor
Ascoli	(Italy) Roberto Benigni	(Italy) Massimo Silva	Max Sport	Carisap, CIAM
Bari	(Italy) Francesco Vinella	(Italy) Vincenzo Torrente	Erreà	Fashion District
Brescia	(Italy) Gino Corioni	(Italy) Alessandro Calori	Givova	UBI Banco di Brescia, SAMA
Cesena	(Italy) Igor Campedelli	(Italy) Pierpaolo Bisoli	Adidas	Technogym
Cittadella	(Italy) Andrea Gabrielli	(Italy) Claudio Foscarini	Garman	Siderurgica Gabrielli, Metalservice
Crotone	(Italy) Raffaele Vrenna	(Italy) Massimo Drago	Zeus	Sovreco, Associazione Italiana Sclerosi Multipla
Empoli	(Italy) Fabrizio Corsi	(Italy) Maurizio Sarri	Royal	NGM Mobile, Computer Gross
Grosseto	(Italy) Piero Camilli	(Italy) Francesco Moriero	Erreà	Industria Lavorazione Carni Ovine, Banca della Maremma
Hellas Verona	(Italy) Maurizio Setti	(Italy) Andrea Mandorlini	Asics	agsm/Leaderform, E-gò/Velox Servizi
Juve Stabia	(Italy) Francesco Giglio	(Italy) Piero Braglia	Fly Line	Paddy Power, Marigo
Livorno	(Italy) Aldo Spinelli	(Italy) Davide Nicola	Legea	Banca Carige, Gruppo Spinelli
Modena	(Italy) Pierluigi Grana	(Italy) Walter Novellino	Givova	CPL Concordia, CoopGas
Novara	(Italy) Carlo Accornero	(Italy) Alfredo Aglietti	Joma	Banca Popolare di Novara, Intesa pour Homme
Padova	(Italy) Marcello Cestaro	(Italy) Franco Colomba	Joma	Famila
Pro Vercelli	(Italy) Massimo Secondo	(Italy) Maurizio Braghin	Erreà	Gruppo Biancamano/Senior Service, Riso Viazzo
Reggina	(Italy) Lillo Foti	(Italy) Giuseppe Pillon	Givova	Ciao Telecom, Stocco & Stocco
Sassuolo	(Italy) Carlo Rossi	(Italy) Eusebio Di Francesco	Sportika	Mapei
Spezia	(Italy) Matteo Volpi	(Italy) Luigi Cagni	Lotto	Carispezia, Gruppo Ferla
Ternana	(Italy) Edoardo Longarini	(Italy) Domenico Toscano	Macron	None
Varese	(Italy) Antonio Rosati	(Italy) Andrea Agostinelli	Adidas	Oro in Euro, Fatigati
Vicenza	(Italy) Tiziano Cunico	(Italy) Alessandro Dal Canto	Macron	Banca Popolare di Vicenza
Virtus Lanciano	(Italy) Valentina Maio	(Italy) Carmine Gautieri	Legea	Gruppo Maio, Banca Popolare di Lanciano e Sulmona

=== Managerial changes ===
Team	Outgoing manager	Manner of departure	Date of vacancy	Position in table	Replaced by	Date of appointment
Reggina	Roberto Breda	End of contract	30 June 2012	Pre season	Davide Dionigi	3 July 2012
Cesena	Mario Beretta	End of contract	30 June 2012	Pre season	Nicola Campedelli	1 July 2012
Sassuolo	Fulvio Pea	End of contract	30 June 2012	Pre season	Eusebio Di Francesco	1 July 2012
Varese	Rolando Maran	Signed by Catania	30 June 2012	Pre season	Fabrizio Castori	1 July 2012
Empoli	Alfredo Aglietti	End of contract	30 June 2012	Pre season	Maurizio Sarri	1 July 2012
Modena	Cristiano Bergodi	End of contract	30 June 2012	Pre season	Dario Marcolin	12 July 2012
Padova	Alessandro Dal Canto	End of contract	30 June 2012	Pre season	Fulvio Pea	1 July 2012
Grosseto	Francesco Statuto	End of caretaker spell	30 June 2012	Pre season	Francesco Moriero	1 July 2012
Cesena	Nicola Campedelli	Sacked	10 September 2012	21st	Pierpaolo Bisoli	11 September 2012
Grosseto	Francesco Moriero	Sacked	1 October 2012	20th	Mario Somma	1 October 2012
Pro Vercelli	Maurizio Braghin	Sacked	15 October 2012	18th	Giancarlo Camolese	15 October 2012
Novara	Attilio Tesser	Sacked	31 October 2012	20th	Giacomo Gattuso	31 October 2012
Novara	Giacomo Gattuso	Sacked	18 November 2012	21st	Alfredo Aglietti	18 November 2012
Grosseto	Mario Somma	Sacked	18 November 2012	22nd	Lamberto Magrini	19 November 2012
Padova	Fulvio Pea	Sacked	17 December 2012	5th	Franco Colomba	17 December 2012
Grosseto	Lamberto Magrini	Sacked	18 December 2012	22nd	Leonardo Menichini	18 December 2012
Pro Vercelli	Giancarlo Camolese	Sacked	3 January 2013	21st	Maurizio Braghin	3 January 2013
Spezia	Michele Serena	Sacked	4 January 2013	12th	Gianluca Atzori	4 January 2013
Vicenza	Roberto Breda	Sacked	28 January 2013	20th	Alessandro Dal Canto	28 January 2013
Grosseto	Leonardo Menichini	Sacked	10 February 2013	22nd	Francesco Moriero	11 February 2013
Spezia	Gianluca Atzori	Sacked	23 February 2013	13th	Luigi Cagni	23 February 2013
Ascoli	Massimo Silva	Sacked	20 March 2013	16th	Rosario Pergolizzi	20 March 2013
Modena	Dario Marcolin	Sacked	20 March 2013	12th	Walter Novellino	20 March 2013
Padova	Franco Colomba	Sacked	20 March 2013	8th	Fulvio Pea	20 March 2013
Ascoli	Rosario Pergolizzi	Sacked	13 April 2013	19th	Massimo Silva	13 April 2013
Varese	Fabrizio Castori	Sacked	17 April 2013	7th	Andrea Agostinelli	17 April 2013

== League table ==
Pos	Team	Pld	W	D	L	GF	GA	GD	Pts	Promotion or relegation
1	Sassuolo (C, P)	42	25	10	7	78	40	+38	85	Promotion to Serie A
2	Hellas Verona (P)	42	23	13	6	67	32	+35	82	Promotion to Serie A
3	Livorno (O, P)	42	23	11	8	77	47	+30	80	Qualification to promotion play-offs
4	Empoli	42	20	13	9	69	51	+18	73	Qualification to promotion play-offs
5	Novara (Note: Novara was docked 3 points due to the 2011 Italian football scandal.)	42	19	10	13	73	46	+27	64	Qualification to promotion play-offs
6	Brescia	42	15	17	10	58	50	+8	62	Qualification to promotion play-offs
7	Varese (Note: Ascoli and Varese were docked 1 point due to the 2011 Italian football scandal.)	42	16	13	13	55	53	+2	60	
8	Modena (Note: Modena and Reggina were docked 2 points due to the 2011 Italian football scandal.)	42	15	12	15	52	51	+1	55	
9	Ternana	42	12	17	13	37	38	−1	53 (Note: TER: 11pts; BAR: 10pts; PAD: 8pts; CRO: 2pts)	
10	Bari (Note: Bari was docked 7 points: 2 points due to financial irregularities and 5 points due to the 2011 Italian football scandal.)	42	16	12	14	55	47	+8	53	
11	Padova	42	12	17	13	47	51	−4	53	
12	Crotone (Note: Crotone was docked 2 points due to financial irregularities.)	42	14	13	15	45	56	−11	53	
13	Spezia	42	12	15	15	52	58	−6	51	
14	Cesena	42	12	14	16	46	58	−12	50 (Note: CES: 8pts; CIT: 5pts; JST: 2pts)	
15	Cittadella	42	12	14	16	48	61	−13	50	
16	Juve Stabia	42	12	14	16	54	65	−11	50	
17	Reggina	42	12	15	15	42	51	−9	49	
18	Virtus Lanciano (Note: No relegation playoffs will be held as Virtus Lanciano is more than 4 points clear of 4th-last place.)	42	9	21	12	50	60	−10	48	
19	Vicenza (R)	42	10	12	20	41	58	−17	42	Relegation to Lega Pro Prima Divisione
20	Ascoli (R)	42	11	9	22	48	67	−19	41	Relegation to Lega Pro Prima Divisione
21	Pro Vercelli (R)	42	8	9	25	37	67	−30	33	Relegation to Lega Pro Prima Divisione
22	Grosseto (R)	42	7	13	22	44	72	−28	28 (Note: Grosseto was docked 6 points due to the 2011 Italian football scandal.)	Relegation to Lega Pro Prima Divisione

Source: Serie B
Rules for classification: 1) points; 2) head-to-head points; 3) head-to-head goal difference; 4) head-to-head goals scored; 5) goal difference; 6) number of goals scored.
(C) Champions; (O) Play-off winners; (P) Promoted; (R) Relegated

=== Promotion play-offs ===
The higher placed team plays the second leg of the promotion playoff at home. If scores are tied after both games in the semifinals the higher placed team progresses to the final. The same conditions apply to the final except for there being extra time played if scores are tied after both games, the higher placed team will be promoted if scores are still level at the end of this period.

Semi-finals
3	Livorno	1	1	2
6	Brescia	1	1	2
4	Empoli	1	4	5
5	Novara	1	1	2

Two-legged Final
3	Livorno	1	1	2
4	Empoli	1	0	1

== Results ==
Home \ Away	ASC	BAR	BRE	CES	CIT	CRO	EMP	GRO	JST	LIV	MOD	NOV	PAD	PVE	REG	SAS	SPE	TER	VAR	HEL	VIC	VLN
Ascoli	—	1–3	2–0	1–0	4–1	2–0	1–2	3–1	2–4	1–4	2–3	2–0	0–1	0–0	0–3	2–4	2–0	1–1	1–1	0–5	0–0	1–1
Bari	0–1	—	1–1	2–1	2–1	0–0	2–3	1–0	2–0	1–1	2–0	1–3	3–0	2–1	0–1	3–3	2–1	2–0	0–1	0–2	1–0	4–3
Brescia	3–2	1–1	—	2–1	2–2	5–0	0–3	3–1	2–0	0–0	2–1	1–1	0–0	1–1	2–2	1–1	0–0	1–0	2–0	2–0	0–1	2–0
Cesena	1–2	1–1	1–3	—	1–0	0–0	1–3	3–2	3–1	0–0	1–0	1–4	2–0	1–1	1–1	0–3	1–1	1–0	2–0	0–0	3–1	1–1
Cittadella	1–0	1–1	1–1	1–1	—	2–2	0–0	2–1	1–0	0–2	0–3	2–6	3–3	3–0	1–2	1–0	0–0	1–0	0–1	2–1	2–2	1–0
Crotone	1–0	0–0	1–0	1–0	3–1	—	3–2	1–0	3–3	1–2	2–1	2–1	0–1	2–1	2–2	2–1	0–2	0–1	1–0	3–3	1–0	0–0
Empoli	0–3	0–1	1–1	1–0	1–0	0–0	—	3–2	5–0	2–1	4–2	0–2	1–1	2–1	1–1	0–3	2–2	0–2	3–1	1–1	2–0	2–2
Grosseto	2–1	4–3	2–2	1–2	3–1	1–0	0–1	—	2–2	0–3	2–0	1–1	1–1	3–0	0–1	1–2	1–1	1–1	2–2	0–2	1–2	2–2
Juve Stabia	1–1	2–1	0–0	2–2	1–1	3–1	1–2	2–1	—	1–3	1–0	2–4	1–0	1–1	1–0	1–1	2–1	1–1	1–2	0–3	1–1	2–1
Livorno	3–0	2–1	3–0	1–0	2–2	1–2	4–2	4–0	2–2	—	1–2	1–3	3–2	2–0	3–3	3–2	1–5	2–1	2–0	0–2	2–0	2–0
Modena	1–1	0–0	1–2	4–0	3–3	3–0	2–3	0–0	1–0	1–0	—	1–0	0–0	1–0	1–1	2–1	1–0	1–2	1–2	1–1	0–1	2–2
Novara	1–0	0–1	4–2	0–1	0–1	5–1	2–2	2–0	1–1	0–1	0–1	—	3–1	2–0	1–1	3–2	1–0	1–2	1–1	1–0	3–1	1–1
Padova	1–1	1–1	0–0	1–1	3–1	2–1	2–0	1–1	1–0	0–0	0–1	3–3	—	0–1	3–2	1–3	1–1	0–0	1–1	2–1	0–1	1–1
Pro Vercelli	3–1	2–1	2–3	1–3	0–0	0–2	0–1	0–0	1–4	1–2	1–2	1–2	1–2	—	0–0	1–3	1–0	1–0	2–1	0–0	2–1	1–2
Reggina	2–0	1–0	0–1	1–2	0–1	1–1	0–3	1–0	2–1	1–3	2–2	1–0	2–1	1–0	—	0–2	1–1	1–1	1–1	1–1	1–0	0–1
Sassuolo	1–0	2–1	1–1	5–0	1–0	2–1	1–1	0–2	1–0	1–0	2–0	2–0	1–1	2–1	3–1	—	3–2	0–0	4–0	1–1	0–0	2–0
Spezia	4–3	3–2	3–1	1–0	0–3	2–1	3–0	2–1	2–3	1–2	1–1	0–6	2–3	1–3	1–0	0–2	—	1–1	0–0	0–1	2–1	1–1
Ternana	1–2	0–0	1–0	0–0	3–1	1–0	0–0	0–0	3–2	1–1	0–1	1–1	2–1	4–2	1–0	1–3	0–0	—	0–1	0–2	0–0	2–2
Varese	2–0	2–2	3–2	3–2	2–0	1–1	2–2	4–0	1–1	1–3	2–0	0–2	3–0	2–0	3–0	3–4	0–0	1–0	—	0–3	1–1	1–2
Hellas Verona	3–1	1–0	4–2	1–1	0–0	3–2	0–0	2–0	1–0	1–1	3–1	1–1	0–2	3–1	2–0	1–0	1–1	2–1	2–0	—	0–1	2–0
Vicenza	1–0	0–1	2–2	3–1	1–2	0–0	1–5	2–1	1–2	3–3	3–3	2–1	0–2	3–1	0–0	0–1	2–3	0–1	1–1	2–3	—	0–1
Virtus Lanciano	1–1	0–3	0–2	3–3	3–2	1–1	0–3	1–1	1–1	1–1	1–1	1–0	2–1	1–1	3–1	2–2	1–1	1–1	1–2	1–2	2–0	—

Source: Serie B
Legend: Blue = home team win; Yellow = draw; Red = away team win.

== Top goalscorers ==
As of 13 May 2013.
24 goals

- Daniele Cacia (Hellas Verona)

22 goals

- Matteo Ardemagni (Modena)

21 goals

- Francesco Tavano (Empoli)

20 goals

- Paulinho (Livorno)

19 goals

- Marco Sansovini (Spezia)

18 goals

- Simone Zaza (Ascoli)

17 goals

- Osarimen Ebagua (Varese)
- Massimo Maccarone (Empoli)

16 goals

- Francesco Caputo (Bari)

15 goals

- Andrea Caracciolo (Brescia)
- Davide Succi (Cesena)

== Attendances ==
#	Club	Average
1	Hellas	15,402
2	Cesena	9,551
3	Vicenza	6,931
4	Bari	6,591
5	Padova	5,873
6	Spezia	5,726
7	Livorno	5,667
8	Ternana	5,465
9	Modena	5,065
10	Novara	4,675
11	Sassuolo	4,465
12	Brescia	4,381
13	Crotone	3,767
14	Varese	3,564
15	Reggina	3,359
16	Ascoli	3,081
17	Empoli	2,648
18	Juve Stabia	2,479
19	Cittadella	2,359
20	Virtus Lanciano	2,184
21	Pro Vercelli	1,895
22	Grosseto	1,511
