= 2011–12 Serie B =

Italian football league season

Serie B
- Season: 2011–12
- Champions: Pescara (2nd title)
- Promoted: Pescara; Torino; Sampdoria (by Play-off)
- Relegated: Nocerina; Gubbio; AlbinoLeffe
- Matches: 440
- Goals: 1,097 (2.49 per match)
- Top goalscorer: Ciro Immobile (28)
- Biggest home win: Sampdoria 6–0 Gubbio (4 September 2011); Torino 6–0 Gubbio (24 March 2012); Pescara 6–0 Vicenza (1 May 2012)
- Biggest away win: Padova 0–6 Pescara (20 April 2012)
- Highest scoring: Pescara 5–3 AlbinoLeffe (1 October 2011)

The 2011–12 Serie B (known as the Serie bwin for sponsorship reasons) was the eightieth season since its establishment in 1929. A total of 22 teams contested the league: 15 of these were returning from the 2010–11 season, four had been promoted from Lega Pro Prima Divisione, and three had been relegated from Serie A. It began on 27 August 2011 and ended on 27 May 2012.

== Changes from last season ==
The league will feature three clubs relegated from Serie A: Brescia returned to the second division after only a single season in the top flight, whereas Bari were relegated after a two-year stint. The third relegated team, Sampdoria, made instead a rather unexpected Serie B return after nine years.

Four teams were promoted from Lega Pro Prima Divisione, three of them returning to Serie B after significant absences, and two of them will play Serie B for their second time in history, Gubbio after 63 years and Juve Stabia after 59 years, while Nocerina will take part to its third Serie B after 32 years. The fourth promoted team, Verona, make instead their return to Serie B after four years; Verona will also participate as one of only three teams in the league who won the Italian national championship at some point in history (the other two being Sampdoria and Torino).

== Events ==
The league started with a number of teams being punished with Ascoli being docked six points (then reduced to three) as a consequence of the 2011 Italian football scandal. Ascoli were also docked one point due to failing to pay social security money in time, together with Crotone and Juve Stabia.

Later in October 2011, Juve Stabia were docked five more points (successively reduced to three) due to their involvement in a matchfixing scandal regarding a 2008–09 Lega Pro Prima Divisione game against Sorrento. Still in October, Ascoli were docked three more points (now totalling a seven-point overall deduction) due to failing to meet some financial deadlines.

On 3 December 2011, the Padova–Torino league match was suspended with the home club leading 1–0 due to an electric stadium blackout; the game was completed 11 days later, and ended with the same result as earlier. Torino, however, appealed, claiming the home club was responsible for the blackout issue, and asked for being awarded the three points instead. In March 2012, the sports magistrature ultimately ruled in favour of the recurring club, and changed the result to a 3–0 win for Torino. However, Padova successfully appealed at the Court of Federal Justice, and on 27 April 2012 the result was switched back to a 1–0 win for the home club.

On 14 April 2012, the Pescara–Livorno game was halted after 30 minutes (the result being 0–2 at the time of suspension) after Livorno footballer Piermario Morosini suffered a heart failure on the pitch and eventually died in transport to hospital. The event caused the immediate cancellation of all Italian football games for the week, with the involving matches (including the remaining 60 minutes of Pescara–Livorno) being delayed to mid-May.

The first season verdict, AlbinoLeffe's relegation after nine consecutive years in the division, came on 5 May 2012. Seven days later, Gubbio became the second relegated club of the season, thus going down on their first season back. On 20 May 2012, the first promotion verdicts arrived as Torino, having already been champion of winter, and Pescara mathematically ensured themselves a place in the top flight for the following season; on that same day, it was also made official that Sassuolo, Verona, Varese and Sampdoria will be the four participants to the post-season promotion playoff tournament. The final regular season week marked Nocerina's direct relegation after only one season following a defeat at the hands of newly crowned champions Pescara, whereas Vicenza and Empoli will play a two-legged relegation playoff to determine the fourth team destined to go down to Lega Pro Prima Divisione.

== Teams ==
Location of teams in Serie B 2011–12

=== Stadia and locations ===
Team	Home city	Stadium	Capacity	2010–11 season
AlbinoLeffe	Albino and Leffe (playing in Bergamo)	Atleti Azzurri d'Italia	26,393	18th in Serie B
Ascoli	Ascoli Piceno	Cino e Lillo Del Duca	20,000	17th in Serie B
Bari	Bari	San Nicola	58,270	20th in Serie A
Brescia	Brescia	Mario Rigamonti	23,486	19th in Serie A
Cittadella	Cittadella	Pier Cesare Tombolato	7,500	14th in Serie B
Crotone	Crotone	Ezio Scida	9,631	11th in Serie B
Empoli	Empoli	Carlo Castellani	19,795	9th in Serie B
Grosseto	Grosseto	Carlo Zecchini	9,909	15th in Serie B
Gubbio	Gubbio	Pietro Barbetti	5,000	Prima Divisione/A champions
Hellas Verona	Verona	Marc'Antonio Bentegodi	39,211	Prima Divisione/A play-off winners
Juve Stabia	Castellammare di Stabia	Romeo Menti	13,000	Prima Divisione/B play-off winners
Livorno	Livorno	Armando Picchi	19,238	7th in Serie B
Modena	Modena	Alberto Braglia	20,507	10th in Serie B
Nocerina	Nocera Inferiore	San Francesco	7,632	Prima Divisione/B champions
Padova	Padua	Euganeo	18,060	5th in Serie B
Pescara	Pescara	Adriatico	24,500	13th in Serie B
Reggina	Reggio Calabria	Oreste Granillo	27,454	6th in Serie B
Sampdoria	Genoa	Luigi Ferraris	36,685	18th in Serie A
Sassuolo	Sassuolo (playing in Modena)	Alberto Braglia	20,507	16th in Serie B
Torino	Turin	Olimpico di Torino	27,994	8th in Serie B
Varese	Varese	Franco Ossola	8,213	4th in Serie B
Vicenza	Vicenza	Romeo Menti	17,163	12th in Serie B

=== Personnel and kits ===
Team	President	Manager	Kit manufacturer	Shirt sponsor
AlbinoLeffe	(Italy) Gianfranco Andreoletti	(Italy) Alessio Pala	Acerbis	UBI Assicurazioni / UBI Banca Popolare di Bergamo, Studio Casa Agenzie Immobiliari
Ascoli	(Italy) Roberto Benigni	(Italy) Massimo Silva	Legea	Carisap, CIAM
Bari	(Italy) Francesco Vinella	(Italy) Vincenzo Torrente	Erreà	Banca Popolare di Bari, Radionorba
Brescia	(Italy) Gino Corioni	(Italy) Alessandro Calori	Mass	UBI Banco di Brescia, SAMA
Cittadella	(Italy) Andrea Gabrielli	(Italy) Claudio Foscarini	Garman	Siderurgica Gabrielli, Metalservice
Crotone	(Italy) Giovanni Vrenna	(Italy) Massimo Drago	Zeus	Sovreco, Associazione Italiana Sclerosi Multipla
Empoli	(Italy) Fabrizio Corsi	(Italy) Alfredo Aglietti	Asics	NGM Mobile, Computer Gross
Grosseto	(Italy) Piero Camilli	(Italy) Francesco Statuto	Erreà	Industria Lavorazione Carni Ovine, Banca della Maremma
Gubbio	(Italy) Marco Fioriti	(Italy) Luigi Apolloni	Givova	Colacem
Hellas Verona	(Italy) Giovanni Martinelli	(Italy) Andrea Mandorlini	Asics	agsm / Sicurint Group, Protec / Leaderform
Juve Stabia	(Italy) Francesco Giglio	(Italy) Piero Braglia	Fly Line	Bonavita Jeans, Gef Consulting SpA / Concilium Italia
Livorno	(Italy) Aldo Spinelli	(Italy) Attilio Perotti	Legea	Banca Carige
Modena	(Italy) Maurizio Rinaldi	(Italy) Cristiano Bergodi	Givova	CoopGas, Immergas
Nocerina	(Italy) Giovanni Citarella	(Italy) Gaetano Auteri	Givova	Alfa Recupero Crediti, Savenergy Group
Padova	(Italy) Marcello Cestaro	(Italy) Alessandro Dal Canto	Joma	Famila, Cassa di Risparmio del Veneto
Pescara	(Italy) Daniele Sebastiani	(Czech Republic) Zdeněk Zeman	Erreà	Gamenet, RisparmioCasa
Reggina	(Italy) Pasquale Foti	(Italy) Roberto Breda	Givova	Canale Group / Goalsbet Italia / Diano Cementi / Progetto5 / Centro Commerciale La Gru, Stocco & Stocco
Sampdoria	(Italy) Riccardo Garrone	(Italy) Giuseppe Iachini	Kappa	Gamenet
Sassuolo	(Italy) Carlo Rossi	(Italy) Fulvio Pea	Sportika	Mapei
Torino	(Italy) Urbano Cairo	(Italy) Gian Piero Ventura	Kappa	Royal Caribbean International / Valmora, aruba.it
Varese	(Italy) Antonio Rosati	(Italy) Rolando Maran	Adidas	Oro in Euro, Gruppo Ing. Claudio Salini / Temporary Agenzia per il lavoro
Vicenza	(Italy) Massimo Masolo	(Italy) Luigi Cagni	Max Sport	Banca Popolare di Vicenza

=== Managerial changes ===
Team	Outgoing manager	Manner of departure	Date of vacancy	Position in table	Replaced by	Date of appointment
Brescia	(Italy) Giuseppe Iachini	Resigned	2 June 2011	Before the start of the season	(Italy) Giuseppe Scienza	29 June 2011
Varese	(Italy) Giuseppe Sannino	End of contract	6 June 2011	Before the start of the season	(Italy) Benito Carbone	16 June 2011
Vicenza	(Italy) Rolando Maran	Sacked	6 June 2011	Before the start of the season	(Italy) Silvio Baldini	13 June 2011
Reggina	(Italy) Gianluca Atzori	End of contract	8 June 2011	Before the start of the season	(Italy) Roberto Breda	23 June 2011
Sampdoria	(Italy) Alberto Cavasin	End of contract	9 June 2011	Before the start of the season	(Italy) Gianluca Atzori	9 June 2011
Sassuolo	(Italy) Paolo Mandelli	End of caretaker spell	9 June 2011	Before the start of the season	(Italy) Fulvio Pea	9 June 2011
Grosseto	(Italy) Michele Serena	Resigned	13 June 2011	Before the start of the season	(Italy) Guido Ugolotti	28 June 2011
Gubbio	(Italy) Vincenzo Torrente	Signed by Bari	15 June 2011	Before the start of the season	(Italy) Fabio Pecchia	18 June 2011
Bari	(Italy) Bortolo Mutti	End of contract	15 June 2011	Before the start of the season	(Italy) Vincenzo Torrente	15 June 2011
Pescara	(Italy) Eusebio Di Francesco	Mutual consent	21 June 2011	Before the start of the season	(Czech Republic) Zdeněk Zeman	21 June 2011
AlbinoLeffe	(Italy) Emiliano Mondonico	Resigned	17 June 2011	Before the start of the season	(Italy) Daniele Fortunato	17 June 2011
Varese	(Italy) Benito Carbone	Sacked	1 October 2011	16th	(Italy) Rolando Maran	1 October 2011
Empoli	(Italy) Alfredo Aglietti	Sacked	2 October 2011	17th	(Italy) Giuseppe Pillon	3 October 2011
Vicenza	(Italy) Silvio Baldini	Sacked	4 October 2011	20th	(Italy) Luigi Cagni	6 October 2011
Gubbio	(Italy) Fabio Pecchia	Sacked	16 October 2011	21st	(Italy) Luigi Simoni (caretaker)	18 October 2011
Grosseto	(Italy) Guido Ugolotti	Sacked	29 October 2011	7th	(Italy) Giuseppe Giannini	29 October 2011
Ascoli	(Italy) Fabrizio Castori	Sacked	2 November 2011	22nd	(Italy) Massimo Silva	2 November 2011
Sampdoria	(Italy) Gianluca Atzori	Sacked	13 November 2011	7th	(Italy) Giuseppe Iachini	14 November 2011
Modena	(Italy) Cristiano Bergodi	Sacked	14 November 2011	19th	(Italy) Agatino Cuttone (caretaker)	14 November 2011
Empoli	(Italy) Giuseppe Pillon	Sacked	20 November 2011	17th	(Italy) Guido Carboni	20 November 2011
Grosseto	(Italy) Giuseppe Giannini	Resigned	3 December 2011	8th	(Italy) Fabio Viviani	5 December 2011
Brescia	(Italy) Giuseppe Scienza	Sacked	12 December 2011	18th	(Italy) Alessandro Calori	12 December 2011
Livorno	(Italy) Walter Novellino	Consensual termination	21 December 2011	18th	(Italy) Armando Madonna	21 December 2011
Nocerina	(Italy) Gaetano Auteri	Sacked	7 January 2012	21st	(Italy) Salvatore Campilongo	7 January 2012
Reggina	(Italy) Roberto Breda	Sacked	8 January 2012	6th	(Italy) Angelo Gregucci	8 January 2012
Crotone	(Italy) Leonardo Menichini	Sacked	23 January 2012	16th	(Italy) Massimo Drago (caretaker)	23 January 2012
Nocerina	(Italy) Salvatore Campilongo	Consensual termination	23 January 2012	22nd	(Italy) Gaetano Auteri	23 January 2012
AlbinoLeffe	(Italy) Daniele Fortunato	Sacked	28 January 2012	18th	(Italy) Sandro Salvioni	28 January 2012
Grosseto	(Italy) Fabio Viviani	Sacked	1 February 2012	11th	(Italy) Guido Ugolotti	1 February 2012
Empoli	(Italy) Guido Carboni	Sacked	12 February 2012	17th	(Italy) Alfredo Aglietti	12 February 2012
Modena	(Italy) Agatino Cuttone (caretaker)	Sacked	26 February 2012	17th	(Italy) Cristiano Bergodi	26 February 2012
Vicenza	(Italy) Luigi Cagni	Sacked	4 March 2012	16th	(Italy) Massimo Beghetto (caretaker)	4 March 2012
Gubbio	(Italy) Luigi Simoni (caretaker)	End of caretaker spell	20 March 2012	20th	(Italy) Marco Alessandrini	20 March 2012
Gubbio	(Italy) Marco Alessandrini	Sacked	2 April 2012	20th	(Italy) Luigi Apolloni	2 April 2012
AlbinoLeffe	(Italy) Sandro Salvioni	Sacked	7 April 2012	22nd	(Italy) Alessio Pala	7 April 2012
Reggina	(Italy) Angelo Gregucci	Sacked	15 April 2012	10th	(Italy) Roberto Breda	15 April 2012
Vicenza	(Italy) Massimo Beghetto (caretaker)	Sacked	29 April 2012	19th	(Italy) Luigi Cagni	29 April 2012
Livorno	(Italy) Armando Madonna	Sacked	6 May 2012	18th	(Italy) Attilio Perotti (caretaker)	6 May 2012
Grosseto	(Italy) Guido Ugolotti	Sacked	14 May 2012	14th	(Italy) Francesco Statuto (caretaker)	14 May 2012

== League table ==
Pos	Team	Pld	W	D	L	GF	GA	GD	Pts	Promotion or relegation
1	Pescara (C, P)	42	26	5	11	90	55	+35	83 (Note: PES 2–0 TOR; TOR 4–2 PES)	Promotion to Serie A
2	Torino (P)	42	24	11	7	57	28	+29	83	Promotion to Serie A
3	Sassuolo	42	22	14	6	57	33	+24	80	Qualification to promotion play-off
4	Hellas Verona	42	23	9	10	60	41	+19	78	Qualification to promotion play-off
5	Varese	42	20	11	11	57	41	+16	71	Qualification to promotion play-off
6	Sampdoria (O, P)	42	17	16	9	53	34	+19	67	Qualification to promotion play-off
7	Padova	42	18	9	15	56	58	−2	63	
8	Brescia	42	15	12	15	48	50	−2	57 (Note: BRE 0–0 JST; JST 0–1 BRE)	
9	Juve Stabia (Note: Juve Stabia was docked 4 points: 1 point due to financial irregularities and 3 points (originally 5 points, reduced to 3 in appeal) for match fixing with Sorrento.)	42	16	13	13	53	49	+4	57	
10	Reggina	42	14	13	15	63	59	+4	55	
11	Crotone (Note: Crotone was docked 2 points due to financial irregularities.)	42	13	15	14	60	58	+2	52 (Note: CRO 2–2 MOD; MOD 1–1 CRO)	
12	Modena	42	12	16	14	50	58	−8	52	
13	Bari (Note: Bari was docked 6 points due to financial irregularities.)	42	14	14	14	47	48	−1	50	
14	Grosseto	42	11	16	15	47	60	−13	49 (Note: GRO 3–3 ASC; ASC 0–2 GRO)	
15	Ascoli (Note: Ascoli was docked 7 points: 4 points due to financial irregularities and 3 points (originally 6 points, reduced to 3 in appeal) due to the 2011 Italian football scandal.)	42	15	11	16	47	50	−3	49	
16	Cittadella	42	13	9	20	51	64	−13	48 (Note: CIT 2–2 LIV; LIV 1–2 CIT)	
17	Livorno	42	12	12	18	49	49	0	48	
18	Empoli	42	12	11	19	48	59	−11	47	Qualification to relegation play-off
19	Vicenza (Note: Vicenza remained in the league for the relegation of Lecce due to a 2011–12 Italian football scandal.) (T)	42	10	14	18	43	61	−18	44	Qualification to relegation play-off
20	Nocerina (R)	42	10	10	22	52	71	−19	40	Relegation to Lega Pro Prima Divisione
21	Gubbio (R)	42	7	11	24	37	69	−32	32	Relegation to Lega Pro Prima Divisione
22	AlbinoLeffe (R)	42	6	12	24	39	69	−30	30	Relegation to Lega Pro Prima Divisione

Source: https://int.soccerway.com/national/italy/serie-b/2011-2012/regular-season/
Rules for classification: 1) points; 2) head-to-head points; 3) head-to-head goal difference; 4) head-to-head goals scored; 5) goal difference; 6) number of goals scored.
(C) Champions; (O) Play-off winners; (P) Promoted; (R) Relegated; (T) Qualified, but not yet for the particular phase indicated

== Results ==
Home \ Away	ALB	ASC	BAR	BRE	CIT	CRO	EMP	GRO	GUB	JST	LIV	MOD	NOC	PAD	PES	REG	SAM	SAS	TOR	VAR	HEL	VIC
AlbinoLeffe	—	1–0	0–2	0–2	1–1	1–3	0–2	2–2	0–0	1–2	0–4	2–1	2–2	1–0	1–1	1–1	1–3	2–3	0–0	1–2	1–1	0–1
Ascoli	1–0	—	3–1	3–1	0–1	3–2	1–1	0–2	2–1	0–0	2–0	0–1	1–0	0–2	3–0	1–1	1–2	0–1	1–2	0–0	1–2	1–1
Bari	2–3	0–0	—	2–2	2–2	1–1	1–0	1–1	3–0	0–0	1–0	0–1	1–1	3–1	0–2	2–1	1–1	1–2	0–0	0–0	0–1	2–2
Brescia	1–3	0–1	1–3	—	2–0	3–0	2–1	2–1	2–2	0–0	1–3	0–0	2–0	1–2	0–3	0–3	0–0	1–2	1–0	1–2	2–1	2–0
Cittadella	2–1	1–3	1–0	0–2	—	0–1	2–1	2–0	2–1	0–1	2–2	2–0	1–3	1–4	1–2	3–2	1–2	0–0	1–1	0–1	1–2	4–2
Crotone	5–2	1–2	0–1	4–1	3–1	—	2–1	2–2	2–1	0–0	1–2	2–2	3–1	2–1	1–2	1–1	1–0	1–1	0–0	1–2	3–1	2–2
Empoli	0–0	3–2	1–0	0–2	3–2	1–1	—	2–2	2–1	2–1	1–1	1–3	2–0	2–4	0–2	3–2	1–3	1–1	1–0	1–2	1–3	1–1
Grosseto	1–0	3–3	0–1	2–0	2–2	2–0	1–1	—	2–0	0–3	1–1	1–1	1–2	2–2	2–4	0–0	0–1	2–2	0–3	1–5	2–1	1–1
Gubbio	1–2	2–3	2–2	0–2	1–0	3–3	0–1	4–0	—	0–0	1–2	2–0	2–1	1–0	0–2	1–3	0–0	0–1	1–0	0–0	1–1	1–1
Juve Stabia	2–2	2–1	1–0	0–1	3–1	2–2	3–1	0–0	1–0	—	1–2	2–2	2–2	2–0	3–2	2–1	1–2	1–3	1–1	2–0	1–2	1–0
Livorno	4–1	0–1	1–2	0–2	1–2	2–1	0–0	2–0	1–1	3–0	—	2–2	0–2	1–2	3–1	0–2	0–0	0–0	0–1	1–3	0–2	1–1
Modena	0–0	2–0	0–1	1–1	3–0	1–1	0–2	2–1	1–1	3–0	1–0	—	2–0	2–1	3–2	3–3	0–2	2–5	2–1	2–0	1–1	0–3
Nocerina	1–0	0–1	1–1	1–1	0–1	0–2	2–1	1–2	2–1	2–3	2–2	1–1	—	3–0	2–4	0–4	4–2	0–1	1–2	2–4	3–1	2–2
Padova	3–2	0–2	1–0	2–1	1–0	1–2	1–1	0–1	3–0	2–2	1–0	2–0	2–2	—	0–6	1–0	1–2	0–2	1–0	1–1	0–0	2–1
Pescara	5–3	4–1	1–2	1–1	1–0	2–0	3–2	1–2	2–1	2–0	0–2	3–1	1–0	1–1	—	0–2	1–0	3–2	2–0	3–1	3–1	6–0
Reggina	1–0	1–1	3–1	1–1	3–3	1–1	3–2	1–1	3–1	1–2	2–1	4–1	2–1	1–4	4–2	—	0–0	1–1	0–1	3–2	0–1	0–3
Sampdoria	1–0	0–0	2–0	2–0	0–0	2–0	1–0	0–0	6–0	1–1	1–1	1–1	2–0	2–2	1–3	3–1	—	1–1	1–2	0–1	2–0	0–1
Sassuolo	1–0	0–0	1–2	1–1	2–0	2–0	1–0	1–0	0–2	2–1	2–1	0–0	3–1	0–1	1–1	4–1	0–0	—	0–0	0–0	2–0	4–2
Torino	0–0	2–1	1–1	0–0	1–1	2–1	2–1	1–0	6–0	1–0	1–0	2–0	3–1	3–1	4–2	1–0	2–1	3–0	—	2–0	1–4	1–0
Varese	2–1	4–0	0–2	2–2	0–1	0–0	0–1	1–3	1–0	2–1	0–2	0–0	2–1	3–0	2–1	2–0	3–1	0–1	0–0	—	0–0	3–0
Hellas Verona	1–0	2–0	4–1	1–0	3–2	2–1	0–0	2–0	1–0	2–0	1–0	2–1	1–1	2–2	1–2	1–0	1–1	1–0	1–3	3–0	—	2–0
Vicenza	2–1	1–1	3–1	0–1	1–4	1–1	1–0	0–1	3–1	0–3	1–1	2–1	0–1	0–1	1–1	0–0	1–1	0–1	0–1	0–2	2–1	—

Source: Serie bwin 2011 – 2012
Legend: Blue = home team win; Yellow = draw; Red = away team win.

== Play-off ==
=== Promotion ===
Semi-finals

- In case of an aggregate tie, the higher seed advances.

First legs will be played on 30 May 2012; return legs on 2 June 2012

Team 1	Agg.	Team 2	1st leg	2nd leg
Sampdoria (6)	3–2	(3) Sassuolo	2–1	1–1
Varese (5)	3–1	(4) Verona	2–0	1–1

30 May 2012 Leg 1	Sampdoria	2–1	Sassuolo	Stadio Luigi Ferraris
17:30	Éder 45'; Pozzi 55'		Pozzi 35' (o.g.)	Attendance: 20,455; Referee: Emilio Ostinelli

30 May 2012 Leg 1	Varese	2–0	Verona	Stadio Franco Ossola
20:00	Kurtić 3'; Terlizzi 78'			Attendance: 7,708; Referee: Massimiliano Irrati

2 June 2012 Leg 2	Verona	1–1	Varese	Stadio Marc'Antonio Bentegodi
17:30	Tachtsidis 21'; Ceccarelli (red card) 85'		Terlizzi 78'	Attendance: 16,615; Referee: Davide Massa

2 June 2012 Leg 2	Sassuolo	1–1	Sampdoria	Stadio Alberto Braglia
20:00	Valeri 62'; Piccioni (red card) 90+5'		Pozzi 8' (pen.)	Attendance: 9,200; Referee: Dino Tommasi

Finals

- In case of an aggregate tie, the higher seed advances.

First leg played 6 June 2012; return leg played 9 June 2012

Team 1	Agg.	Team 2	1st leg	2nd leg
Sampdoria (6)	4–2	(5) Varese	3–2	1–0

Sampdoria promoted to Serie A.

6 June 2012	Sampdoria	3–2	Varese	Stadio Luigi Ferraris
19:45	Gastaldello 21', 81'; Pozzi 47'		Rivas 25'; De Luca 56'	Referee: Piero Giacomelli

9 June 2012	Varese	0–1	Sampdoria	Stadio Franco Ossola
19:45			Pozzi 90'	Referee: Giampaolo Calvarese

=== Relegation ===
First leg played on 3 June 2012; return leg played on 8 June 2012

- In case of an aggregate tie, the higher seed advances.

Team 1	Agg.	Team 2	1st leg	2nd leg
Vicenza (19)	2–3	(18) Empoli	0–0	2–3

Vicenza is relegated to Lega Pro Prima Divisione.

3 June 2012 Leg 1	Vicenza	0–0	Empoli	Stadio Romeo Menti
19:45

8 June 2012 Leg 1	Empoli	3–2	Vicenza	Stadio Carlo Castellani
19:45	Mchedlidze 71'; Tavano 73' (pen.); Maccarone 90+4'		Paolucci 59', 65'

== Top goalscorers ==
Updated 21 May 2012

28 goals

- (Italy) Ciro Immobile (Pescara)

21 goals

- (Italy) Marco Sau (Juve Stabia)

20 goals

- (Italy) Ferdinando Sforzini (Grosseto)
- (Italy) Gianluca Sansone (Sassuolo)

19 goals

- (Italy) Francesco Tavano (Empoli)

18 goals

- (Italy) Lorenzo Insigne (Pescara)

17 goals

- (Brazil) Caetano (Crotone)

16 goals

- (Brazil) Jonathas (Brescia)
- (Italy) Marco Sansovini (Pescara)

15 goals

- (Italy) Nicola Pozzi (Sampdoria)
- (Senegal) Papa Waigo (Ascoli)

14 goals

- (Argentina) Juanito (Verona)

== Attendances ==
#	Club	Average
1	Sampdoria	20,854
2	Torino	15,897
3	Hellas	14,084
4	Pescara	13,940
5	Padova	8,094
6	Vicenza	6,221
7	Bari	5,275
8	Modena	5,265
9	Livorno	4,822
10	Nocerina	4,821
11	Reggina	4,629
12	Brescia	4,386
13	Varese	3,797
14	Crotone	3,630
15	Gubbio	3,540
16	Juve Stabia	3,369
17	Sassuolo	3,250
18	Ascoli	3,091
19	Empoli	2,757
20	Cittadella	2,354
21	AlbinoLeffe	2,265
22	Grosseto	1,980
