= 2015–16 Serie B =

Italian football league season

Serie B
- Season: 2015–16
- Champions: Cagliari (1st title)
- Promoted: Cagliari; Crotone; Pescara (by play-off)
- Relegated: Virtus Lanciano; Livorno; Modena; Como
- Matches: 427
- Goals: 1,028 (2.41 per match)
- Top goalscorer: Gianluca Lapadula (23 goals)
- Biggest home win: Cagliari 6–0 Brescia (16 April 2016)
- Biggest away win: Como 0–4 Ascoli (3 October 2015)
- Highest scoring: Bari 4–3 Spezia (6 September 2015)
- Longest winning run: 8 games (Trapani)
- Longest unbeaten run: 18 games (Trapani)
- Longest winless run: 15 games (Como)
- Longest losing run: 5 games (Ascoli)
- Highest attendance: 27,278; Bari 2–1 Salernitana (6 November 2015)
- Lowest attendance: 1,499; Virtus Entella 1–0 Pro Vercelli (3 October 2015)
- Average attendance: 6,847

The 2015–16 Serie B (known as the Serie B ConTe.it for sponsorship reasons) was the 84th season since its establishment in 1929. A total of 22 teams contested the league: 16 returning from the 2014–15 season, 4 promoted from Lega Pro, and 2 relegated from Serie A. Vacancies created by the bankruptcy of Serie A-relegated Parma and the demotion of Catania to Lega Pro due to match fixing allowed Brescia to remain in the league despite being relegated. Furthermore, Teramo was due to participate to Serie B but due to the allegations for match-fixing, the Courts decided to relegate Teramo in the last place of Lega Pro of the previous season. After the demotion of Catania, Virtus Entella was readmitted into Serie B as the best team of the relegated teams from the previous season. Furthermore, Ascoli was promoted into the championship after finishing second in Lega Pro Group B, second after Teramo before being stripped of the title for the match-fixing scandal.

Serie B introduced the "green card" at the beginning of the season. The green card was given to promote fair play and good acts. The green card was not given during the game, as it would alter sport rules, but awarded after the match to a player or coach who exhibited fair play by the referee. The player or coach with the most green cards at the end of the season was rewarded.

== Teams ==
Relegated from 2014–15 Serie A:

- Cagliari
- Cesena

From 2014–15 Serie B:

- Vicenza
- Spezia
- Perugia
- Pescara
- Avellino
- Livorno
- Bari
- Trapani
- Ternana
- Latina
- Lanciano
- Pro Vercelli
- Crotone
- Modena
- Brescia
- Virtus Entella

Promoted from 2014–15 Lega Pro:

- Novara
- Ascoli
- Salernitana
- Como

=== Stadia and locations ===
Location of teams in 2015–16 Serie B

Team	Home city	Stadium	Capacity	2014–15 season
Ascoli	Ascoli	Del Duca	20,550	Lega Pro/B champions
Avellino	Avellino	Partenio	26,000	8th in Serie B
Bari	Bari	San Nicola	58,270	10th in Serie B
Brescia	Brescia	Mario Rigamonti	16,308	20th in Serie B
Cagliari	Cagliari	Sant'Elia	16,000	18th in Serie A
Cesena	Cesena	Dino Manuzzi	23,900	19th in Serie A
Como	Como	Giuseppe Sinigaglia	13,602	Lega Pro Play-off winners
Crotone	Crotone	Ezio Scida	9,631	16th in Serie B
Latina	Latina	Domenico Francioni	6,850	13th in Serie B
Livorno	Livorno	Armando Picchi	19,238	9th in Serie B
Modena	Modena	Alberto Braglia	21,151	17th in Serie B
Novara	Novara	Silvio Piola	17,875	Lega Pro/A champions
Perugia	Perugia	Renato Curi	28,000	6th in Serie B
Pescara	Pescara	Adriatico	20,476	7th in Serie B
Pro Vercelli	Vercelli	Silvio Piola	5,500	15th in Serie B
Salernitana	Salerno	Arechi	37,245	Lega Pro/C champions
Spezia	La Spezia	Alberto Picco	10,000	5th in Serie B
Ternana	Terni	Libero Liberati	22,000	12th in Serie B
Trapani	Trapani	Provinciale (Erice)	7,000	11th in Serie B
Vicenza	Vicenza	Romeo Menti	17,163	3rd in Serie B
Virtus Entella	Chiavari	Comunale	4,154	18th in Serie B
Virtus Lanciano	Lanciano	Guido Biondi	5,639	14th in Serie B

=== Personnel and kits ===
Team	President	Manager	Kit manufacturer	Shirt sponsor (front)	Shirt sponsor (back)	Shorts sponsor
Ascoli	(Italy) (Canada) Francesco Bellini	(Italy) Devis Mangia	Max Sport	Fainplast/CIAM	Brosway	Rosso Piceno
Avellino	(Italy) Walter Taccone	(Italy) Attilio Tesser	Givova	Gruppo Taccone/Alzati Sannio/Kia Motor Group Avellino-Nola/Biotermocamino Helios Tecnologie	None	None
Bari	(Italy) Gianluca Paparesta	(Italy) Andrea Camplone	Nike	Puglia, Balkan Express	None	ESIM
Brescia	(Italy) Luigi Ragazzoni	(Italy) Roberto Boscaglia	Acerbis	UBI Banco di Brescia	None	None
Cagliari	(Italy) Tommaso Giulini	(Italy) Massimo Rastelli	Kappa	Football Cares/Spontini/ISOLA, EP/Gruppo Grendi	Pecorino Romano/Eva Arredamenti	Energit
Cesena	(Italy) Giorgio Lugaresi	(Italy) Massimo Drago	Lotto	SunTrades	None	None
Como	(Italy) Pietro Porro, (Italy) Gianluca Zambrotta	(Italy) Stefano Cuoghi	Legea	Verga Promozionali, FoxTown	None	None
Crotone	(Italy) Raffaele Vrenna	(Croatia) Ivan Jurić	Zeus	Metal Carpenteria	V&V Group	None
Latina	(Italy) Pasquale Maietta	(Italy) Carmine Gautieri	Givova	Logistica & Trasporti Sarchioto	None	Re Chips
Livorno	(Italy) Aldo Spinelli	(Italy) Ezio Gelain	Legea	None	None	Kia
Modena	(Italy) Angelo Forcina	(Italy) Cristiano Bergodi	Erreà	Casa Modena/Safim Architettura	None	None
Novara	(Italy) Massimo De Salvo	(Italy) Marco Baroni	Joma	Banca Popolare di Novara, Comoli Ferrari	Cristina Rubinetterie	None
Perugia	(Italy) Massimiliano Santopadre	(Italy) Pierpaolo Bisoli	Frankie Garage	Piccini Group, Fortinfissi	Tedesco Group	None
Pescara	(Italy) Daniele Sebastiani	(Italy) Massimo Oddo	Erreà	Officina Meccanica Angelucci, Pharmapiù	DZ Insurance Sport	Vincenzo Serraiocco Consulting
Pro Vercelli	(Italy) Massimo Secondo	(Italy) Claudio Foscarini	Erreà	Amteco, GLI Gestione Logistica Interna	None	None
Salernitana	(Italy) Marco Mezzaroma	(Italy) Leonardo Menichini	Givova	Caffè Motta, Supermercati eté	None	IASA
Spezia	(Italy) Matteo Volpi	(Italy) Domenico Di Carlo	Acerbis	Carispezia	None	None
Ternana	(Italy) Giuseppe Masoni	(Italy) Roberto Breda	Macron	CIesse Piumini	None	None
Trapani	(Italy) Vittorio Morace	(Italy) Serse Cosmi	Joma	Ustica Lines	None	None
Vicenza	(Italy) Tiziano Cunico	(Italy) Franco Lerda	Macron	Banca Popolare di Vicenza	Estel Group	None
Virtus Entella	(Italy) Antonio Gozzi	(Italy) Alfredo Aglietti	Acerbis	Creditis, Arinox	None	Due Energie
Virtus Lanciano	(Italy) Valentina Maio	(Italy) Primo Maragliulo	Legea	In Opera, Marfisi Carni	None	None

=== Managerial changes ===
Team	Outgoing manager	Manner of departure	Date of vacancy	Position in table	Replaced by	Date of appointment
Brescia	(Italy) Alessandro Calori	Sacked	26 May 2015	Pre-season	(Italy) Roberto Boscaglia	24 June 2015
Crotone	(Italy) Massimo Drago	Mutual consent	28 May 2015	Pre-season	(Croatia) Ivan Jurić	9 June 2015
Cagliari	(Italy) Gianluca Festa	End of contract	31 May 2015	Pre-season	(Italy) Massimo Rastelli	12 June 2015
Perugia	(Italy) Andrea Camplone	End of contract	31 May 2015	Pre-season	(Italy) Pierpaolo Bisoli	5 June 2015
Cesena	(Italy) Domenico Di Carlo	Sacked	6 June 2015	Pre-season	(Italy) Massimo Drago	8 June 2015
Modena	(Italy) Simone Pavan	Sacked	10 June 2015	Pre-season	(Argentina) Hernán Crespo	30 June 2015
Avellino	(Italy) Massimo Rastelli	Signed by Cagliari	12 June 2015	Pre-season	(Italy) Attilio Tesser	13 June 2015
Ternana	(Italy) Attilio Tesser	Signed by Avellino	13 June 2015	Pre-season	(Italy) Domenico Toscano	24 July 2015
Ternana	(Italy) Domenico Toscano	Resigned	23 September 2015	22nd	(Italy) Roberto Breda	28 September 2015
Pro Vercelli	(Italy) Cristiano Scazzola	Sacked	11 October 2015	20th	(Italy) Claudio Foscarini	11 October 2015
Como	(Italy) Carlo Sabatini	Sacked	31 October 2015	22nd	(Italy) Gianluca Festa	1 November 2015
Latina	(Italy) Mark Iuliano	Sacked	2 November 2015	12th	(Italy) Mario Somma	2 November 2015
Ascoli	(Italy) Mario Petrone	Mutual consent	2 November 2015	19th	(Italy) Devis Mangia	4 November 2015
Spezia	(Croatia) Nenad Bjelica	Sacked	21 November 2015	15th	(Italy) Domenico Di Carlo	23 November 2015
Livorno	(Italy) Christian Panucci	Sacked	25 November 2015	7th	(Italy) Bortolo Mutti	25 November 2015
Bari	(Italy) Davide Nicola	Sacked	31 December 2015	6th	(Italy) Andrea Camplone	31 December 2015
Livorno	(Italy) Bortolo Mutti	Sacked	27 January 2016	18th	(Italy) Christian Panucci	27 January 2016
Virtus Lanciano	(Italy) Roberto D'Aversa	Sacked	30 January 2016	21st	(Italy) Primo Maragliulo	1 February 2016
Salernitana	(Italy) Vincenzo Torrente	Sacked	2 February 2016	20th	(Italy) Leonardo Menichini	2 February 2016
Latina	(Italy) Mario Somma	Sacked	28 February 2016	14th	(Italy) Carmine Gautieri	7 March 2016
Como	(Italy) Gianluca Festa	Sacked	13 March 2016	22nd	(Italy) Stefano Cuoghi	13 March 2016
Vicenza	(Italy) Pasquale Marino	Sacked	14 March 2016	20th	(Italy) Franco Lerda	15 March 2016
Livorno	(Italy) Christian Panucci	Sacked	21 March 2016	19th	(Italy) Franco Colomba	21 March 2016
Avellino	(Italy) Attilio Tesser	Sacked	22 March 2016	12th	(Italy) Dario Marcolin	22 March 2016
Modena	(Argentina) Hernán Crespo	Sacked	26 March 2016	17th	(Italy) Cristiano Bergodi	28 March 2016
Livorno	(Italy) Franco Colomba	Sacked	16 April 2016	21st	(Italy) Ezio Gelain	16 April 2016
Avellino	(Italy) Dario Marcolin	Sacked	20 April 2016	13th	(Italy) Attilio Tesser	20 April 2016

== League table ==
Pos	Team	Pld	W	D	L	GF	GA	GD	Pts	Promotion, qualification or relegation
1	Cagliari (C, P)	42	25	8	9	78	41	+37	83	Promotion to Serie A
2	Crotone (P)	42	23	13	6	61	36	+25	82	Promotion to Serie A
3	Trapani	42	20	13	9	64	49	+15	73	Qualification to promotion play-offs semi-finals
4	Pescara (O, P)	42	21	9	12	69	52	+17	72	Qualification to promotion play-offs semi-finals
5	Bari	42	19	11	12	58	48	+10	68	Qualification to promotion play-offs preliminary round
6	Cesena (Note: Cesena at the beginning was deducted one point for financial irregularities, then the deduction was removed.)	42	19	11	12	57	37	+20	68	Qualification to promotion play-offs preliminary round
7	Spezia	42	17	15	10	47	45	+2	66	Qualification to promotion play-offs preliminary round
8	Novara (Note: Novara was deducted two points for administrative irregularities.)	42	19	10	13	57	35	+22	65	Qualification to promotion play-offs preliminary round
9	Virtus Entella	42	17	13	12	51	40	+11	64	
10	Perugia	42	14	13	15	40	40	0	55	
11	Brescia	42	14	12	16	55	64	−9	54	
12	Ternana	42	15	8	19	50	56	−6	53	
13	Vicenza	42	11	16	15	41	53	−12	49	
14	Avellino	42	13	10	19	52	66	−14	49	
15	Ascoli	42	13	8	21	45	64	−19	47	
16	Latina	42	10	16	16	44	51	−7	46	
17	Pro Vercelli	42	11	13	18	43	53	−10	46	
18	Salernitana (O)	42	9	18	15	48	62	−14	45	Relegation play-out
19	Virtus Lanciano (Note: Virtus Lanciano was deducted four points for financial irregularities.) (R, E, R, R)	42	12	12	18	43	56	−13	44	Bankruptcy after play-out
20	Livorno (R)	42	10	12	20	45	57	−12	42	Relegation to Lega Pro
21	Modena (R)	42	11	9	22	37	55	−18	42	Relegation to Lega Pro
22	Como (R)	42	5	18	19	39	64	−25	33	Relegation to Lega Pro

Source: Lega Serie B
(C) Champions; (E) Eliminated; (O) Play-off winners; (P) Promoted; (R) Relegated

== Promotion play-offs ==
Because teams 4-8 finished within the 14 point margin to third, six teams played in the promotion play-offs. A preliminary one-legged round, played at the home venue of the higher placed team, involved the teams from 5th to 8th place. The two winning teams played against the 3rd and 4th-placed teams in the two-legged semi-finals. The higher placed team played the second leg of the promotion playoff at home. Pescara won the promotion play-offs to Serie A.

Preliminary round
5	Bari	3
8	Novara (a.e.t.)	4
6	Cesena	1
7	Spezia	2

Semi-finals
8	Novara	0	2	2
4	Pescara	2	4	6
7	Spezia	0	0	0
3	Trapani	1	2	3

Final
4	Pescara	2	1	3
3	Trapani	0	1	1

== Relegation play-out ==
Team 1	Agg.	Team 2	1st leg	2nd leg
Virtus Lanciano (19)	1–5	Salernitana (18)	1–4	0–1

== Results ==
Home \ Away	ASC	AVE	BAR	BRE	CAG	CES	COM	CRO	LAT	LIV	MOD	NOV	PER	PES	PVE	SAL	SPE	TER	TRA	VIC	VET	VLN
Ascoli		3–4	0–1	0–0	2–1	1–3	1–0	0–1	0–0	1–3	2–1	1–3	1–0	3–1	0–1	2–2	3–0	1–0	0–0	1–2	1–0	1–0
Avellino	3–0		1–1	3–3	1–2	1–2	1–1	0–0	3–1	2–1	2–0	0–0	1–2	1–3	1–0	1–0	0–1	0–2	1–3	1–4	2–0	3–2
Bari	3–0	2–1		1–2	0–3	0–0	3–0	2–3	0–0	1–0	1–1	1–1	1–0	0–0	6–2	2–1	4–3	4–0	1–2	2–1	0–0	1–0
Brescia	2–2	1–0	2–3		4–0	2–1	2–1	3–0	1–0	1–3	2–2	0–0	2–2	2–0	2–0	2–2	1–1	0–0	3–0	0–1	2–0	2–1
Cagliari	3–0	2–1	2–1	6–0		3–1	1–1	4–0	3–2	2–2	2–1	0–1	0–2	2–1	3–0	3–0	1–2	1–0	4–1	2–0	1–0	1–1
Cesena	3–0	1–2	0–2	2–0	2–1		3–1	2–1	3–0	1–0	2–0	1–0	2–1	1–0	2–1	1–2	5–1	4–0	0–0	1–1	2–0	2–0
Como	0–4	0–1	1–1	1–3	1–1	1–3		0–1	1–1	1–2	1–1	1–1	1–0	0–2	1–1	2–1	4–0	1–2	0–0	1–1	1–1	1–1
Crotone	2–0	3–1	4–1	1–1	3–1	2–0	2–0		1–1	3–0	1–0	2–1	1–2	4–2	1–1	4–0	0–0	3–0	0–0	2–0	1–0	1–0
Latina	1–0	3–0	1–2	2–2	1–3	1–0	1–1	2–2		3–1	0–1	1–0	2–1	0–1	1–0	2–2	0–0	1–2	1–1	2–1	0–1	2–2
Livorno	1–3	1–1	1–2	3–1	1–1	1–1	1–1	0–0	1–0		2–0	0–1	1–1	4–0	0–1	0–0	1–2	1–0	2–0	2–2	0–0	2–2
Modena	2–1	1–1	2–1	1–0	1–2	0–0	1–2	1–1	0–2	1–0		3–0	3–0	2–5	1–0	2–0	1–1	1–0	1–4	0–1	0–1	1–0
Novara	2–0	4–1	1–2	4–0	1–0	0–0	0–2	0–1	1–1	2–1	4–0		2–2	1–0	1–1	1–1	1–0	1–2	4–1	4–0	1–0	4–1
Perugia	0–2	2–0	0–0	4–0	0–0	0–0	2–0	0–0	2–0	4–1	1–0	1–4		0–4	1–2	1–1	0–0	1–0	0–2	0–1	0–0	2–0
Pescara	2–2	3–2	3–1	2–1	1–0	1–0	2–1	4–1	1–1	2–1	1–0	1–2	2–1		1–0	1–1	2–2	1–2	1–2	1–1	2–0	4–0
Pro Vercelli	1–1	1–1	0–1	2–1	1–2	2–0	2–0	0–2	1–1	1–0	0–1	0–1	0–1	5–2		1–1	0–1	1–2	1–1	2–1	2–3	2–1
Salernitana	2–0	3–1	3–4	3–0	0–2	1–1	1–0	1–1	3–2	3–1	0–0	1–0	1–1	2–2	1–2		0–2	2–1	0–1	0–0	2–2	1–3
Spezia	0–0	1–1	0–0	2–1	0–3	1–1	1–1	0–1	2–1	3–0	2–0	1–0	1–0	0–1	1–1	3–1		1–0	1–2	1–0	0–0	2–0
Ternana	1–3	0–3	3–0	3–2	1–1	1–1	4–0	1–2	0–0	2–3	2–1	2–0	0–1	1–0	2–2	4–0	1–2		1–0	2–0	1–2	1–1
Trapani	4–3	2–1	1–0	3–0	2–2	2–1	3–0	3–0	1–2	1–0	2–1	0–0	0–0	0–3	1–1	1–1	5–1	3–0		1–2	4–2	1–1
Vicenza	3–0	0–0	0–0	1–2	0–2	1–1	3–3	0–0	1–1	2–0	2–1	0–2	0–0	2–2	1–1	0–0	0–3	2–1	1–2		2–1	0–2
Virtus Entella	4–0	4–0	2–0	0–0	1–3	2–1	2–2	1–2	1–0	0–0	1–0	1–0	2–1	0–0	1–0	1–0	2–2	2–2	4–0	4–1		1–1
Virtus Lanciano	2–0	1–2	1–0	1–0	1–3	2–0	1–0	1–1	2–1	2–1	2–1	2–1	0–1	1–2	1–0	2–2	0–0	1–1	0–3	0–0	1–2	

Source: Lega Serie B
Legend: Blue = home team win; Yellow = draw; Red = away team win.

== Top goalscorers ==
Rank	Player	Club	Goals
1	(Italy) Gianluca Lapadula	Pescara	27
2	(Italy) Francesco Caputo	Virtus Entella	17
2	(Italy) Daniele Cacia	Ascoli	17
4	(Croatia) Ante Budimir	Crotone	16
4	(Italy) Simone Ganz	Como	16
6	(Italy) Massimo Coda	Salernitana	15
6	(Italy) Daniele Vantaggiato	Livorno	15
8	(Brazil) Diego Farias	Cagliari	14
9	(Italy) Gianluca Caprari	Pescara	13
9	(Brazil) João Pedro	Cagliari	13
9	(Italy) Felice Evacuo	Novara	13
9	(Italy) Riccardo Maniero	Bari	13

== Attendance data ==
Pos	Team	Total	High	Low	Average	Change
1	Bari	449,677	31,107	15,056	21,413	+11.1%
2	Cagliari	261,978	15,551	9,785	12,475	+18.2%^{1}
3	Cesena	256,345	14,353	10,631	12,207	−24.7%^{1}
4	Salernitana	255,115	22,140	8,382	12,148	+13.4%^{2}
5	Perugia	194,113	12,075	7,889	9,243	−14.7%
6	Pescara	170,333	13,790	5,648	8,111	+15.8%
7	Vicenza	161,284	11,104	6,740	7,680	−2.4%
8	Brescia	160,929	10,397	5,055	7,663	+28.9%
9	Spezia	152,558	8,198	6,487	7,265	+15.3%
10	Crotone	148,276	9,263	4,052	7,061	+56.0%
11	Ascoli	138,067	9,216	5,082	6,575	+27.8%^{2}
12	Avellino	132,625	10,125	4,500	6,315	−11.1%
13	Livorno	129,735	9,839	5,207	6,178	−2.5%
14	Trapani	106,854	6,959	3,975	5,088	+1.0%
15	Modena	105,354	8,355	3,832	5,017	−8.1%
16	Novara	102,693	6,655	3,851	4,890	+20.4%^{2}
17	Ternana	81,425	10,453	2,843	3,877	−20.9%
18	Como	68,496	6,035	1,544	3,262	+127.8%^{2}
19	Latina	65,469	3,938	2,292	3,118	−18.2%
20	Pro Vercelli	63,981	5,352	2,316	3,047	+2.0%
21	Virtus Lanciano	57,367	4,181	2,147	2,732	−9.7%
22	Virtus Entella	45,620	5,521	1,499	2,172	−0.2%
	League total	3,308,294	31,107	1,499	7,161	+8.9%

Source: Official club websites and Lega Serie B
Notes:
1: Team played last season in Serie A.
2: Team played last season in Lega Pro.
