= Ivan Jurić =

Croatian footballer and manager (born 1975)

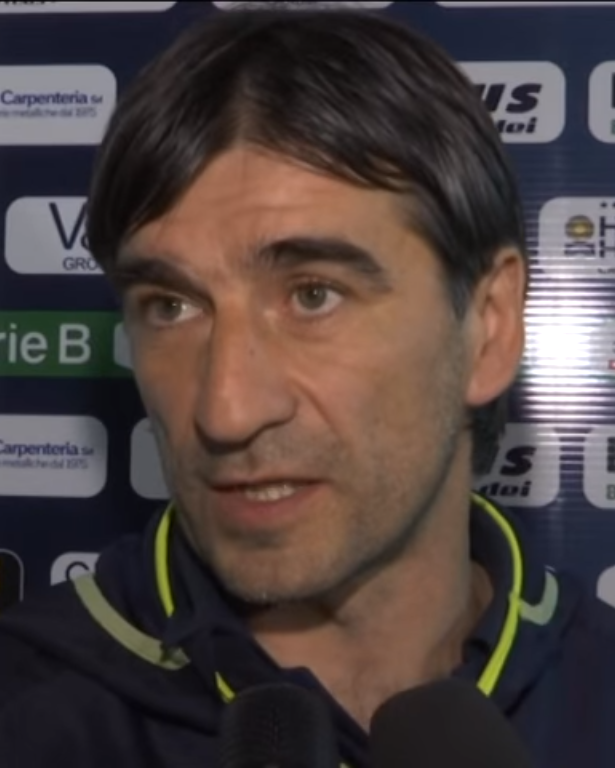
- Jurić as Crotone manager in 2016

Personal information
- Date of birth: 25 August 1975 (age 51)
- Place of birth: Split, SR Croatia, Yugoslavia
- Height: 1.74 m (5 ft 9 in)
- Position: Midfielder

Team information
- Current team: Monza (head coach)

Senior career*
Years	Team	Apps	(Gls)
1993–1997	Hajduk Split	53	(2)
1997–2001	Sevilla	64	(6)
2001	→ Albacete (loan)	17	(1)
2001	Šibenik	2	(0)
2001–2006	Crotone	148	(10)
2006–2010	Genoa	84	(1)
Total		368	(20)

International career
1993	Croatia U17	2	(0)
1993–1994	Croatia U18	2	(0)
1993–1994	Croatia U19	4	(0)
1995	Croatia U20	2	(0)
1995–1997	Croatia U21	16	(1)
2009	Croatia	5	(0)

Managerial career
- 2014–2015: Mantova
- 2015–2016: Crotone
- 2016–2017: Genoa
- 2017: Genoa
- 2018: Genoa
- 2019–2021: Hellas Verona
- 2021–2024: Torino
- 2024: Roma
- 2024–2025: Southampton
- 2025: Atalanta
- 2026–: Monza
- * Club domestic league appearances and goals

Ivan Jurić (pronounced [ǐʋan jǔːritɕ]; born 25 August 1975) is a Croatian professional football manager and a former player who is the head coach of Serie A club Monza.

A midfielder, Jurić made his professional debut at Hajduk Split in 1993. He went on to play for Sevilla, Albacete, Šibenik, Crotone, and Genoa, where he retired in 2010. Jurić also earned five caps for Croatia in 2009.

Jurić has spent the majority of his managerial career in Italy, where he managed Mantova in Lega Pro, as well as Hellas Verona, Torino and Roma in Serie A. He signed for Premier League club Southampton in December 2024, before leaving in April 2025. Jurić then returned to Serie A as the manager of Atalanta in June 2025, though was dismissed in November of that year.

== Club career ==
Jurić was born in Split, Yugoslavia on 25 August 1975. There, he began his football career with Hajduk Split, making his debut in 1993. Jurić then moved to Spain to join Sevilla in July 1997. Following promotion from the Segunda División in 1998–99, he made his La Liga debut on 7 November 1999 as a 68th-minute substitute for Nicolás Olivera, in a goalless home draw with Athletic Bilbao, and was sent off. His first goal in the division came on 19 March 2000, in a 4–0 home win over Numancia played in Jerez de la Frontera due to previous crowd trouble at the Ramón Sánchez Pizjuán Stadium. He totalled 12 games that season, but his team finished in last place and was relegated. Jurić scored his second goal on the final day of the season, in a 3–2 home loss to Rayo Vallecano.

In January 2001, Jurić joined fellow Segunda División club Albacete who beat Club Brugge in trying to secure his services. He played 20 games in his one season with the club, opening the score in a 2–1 home win over Real Murcia on 18 February. After a short time back in Croatia with Šibenik, he moved to Italy in 2001 to join Serie B team Crotone. Jurić then moved to Genoa in 2006, following his mentor Gian Piero Gasperini, his former head coach at Crotone. He announced his retirement, at the age of 34, in June 2010, and expressed interest in becoming a football coach.

== International career ==
Jurić made his international debut for Croatia in a friendly match against Romania on 11 February 2009, when he was 33. He played for the national team five times, without scoring any goals. His final international was a September 2009 World Cup qualification match against Belarus.

== Managerial career ==
=== Early career ===
After retiring as a footballer, Jurić stayed at Genoa as a youth team coach for the 2010–11 season. He passed the UEFA A coaching exam in June 2011.

On 5 July 2011, he joined new Inter manager Gian Piero Gasperini as one of his first team coaches. He was sacked alongside Gasperini and the rest of his staff in September of that year. Jurić then reunited with his mentor as an assistant coach at Palermo in September 2012.

On 17 June 2014, Jurić became head coach of Lega Pro team Mantova on a two-year contract. He then joined Serie B side Crotone in 2015–16, winning promotion to the top flight for the first time in the club's history.

=== Genoa ===
On 28 June 2016, Jurić was appointed head coach of Genoa in Serie A. Despite victories against AC Milan and Juventus, he was sacked on 19 February 2017, after a 5–0 defeat against bottom-placed Pescara.

He was reinstated as Genoa manager on 10 April 2017 after the sacking of Andrea Mandorlini. Jurić guided Genoa to safety with one game to spare, following a 2–1 victory against Torino. The following season, he was dismissed again on 5 November 2017 following a 2–0 defeat in the Derby della Lanterna.

On 9 October 2018, he was appointed manager of Genoa for the third time. On 6 December 2018, he was sacked once more after losing to third-tier side Virtus Entella on penalties in the Coppa Italia.

=== Hellas Verona ===
In July 2019, he was appointed manager at newly promoted Serie A club Hellas Verona. During his tenure, Jurić guided the club to back-to-back top-half finishes in the league. Hellas Verona released him from his contract on 28 May 2021.

=== Torino ===
On the day of his departure from Hellas Verona, Jurić was unveiled as the new head coach of Torino, effective 1 July 2021. After three consecutive mid-table finishes with Il Toro, he amicably parted ways with the club at the end of the 2023–24 campaign.

=== Roma ===
On 18 September 2024, Jurić became the new head coach of Roma following the sacking of Daniele De Rossi, who had won a mere three points in the first four games of the season. Jurić failed to turn the team's fortunes and was regularly criticized for his management style and poor results. He was eventually dismissed on 10 November 2024 after a 3–2 home loss to Bologna that left Roma only four points above the relegation zone in Serie A while sitting 20th in the Europa League table.

=== Southampton ===
On 21 December 2024, Jurić was named manager of Premier League side Southampton and signed an 18-month contract. His first game in charge was a 1–0 home defeat against West Ham United on 26 December. On 12 January 2025, Jurić secured his first competitive victory in England with a 3–0 win against Swansea City in the FA Cup. He secured his first Premier League victory on 1 February with a 2–1 away win against Ipswich Town, which would be his only win in the competition. Following a 3–1 defeat against Tottenham Hotspur on 6 April, Southampton were relegated to the Championship with seven games remaining, becoming the earliest team to suffer relegation in Premier League history. Jurić stepped down as manager on 7 April.

=== Atalanta ===
On 6 June 2025, Jurić was appointed manager of Atalanta, signing a contract until 2027. He was dismissed three months into the season, following a run of six consecutive draws and two defeats in Serie A – culminating in a 3–0 loss at home against newly-promoted Sassuolo – that left Atalanta 13th in the Serie A standings.

=== Monza ===
On 29 June 2026, Jurić was appointed manager of newly-promoted Serie A side Monza.

== Managerial style ==
Jurić is often considered a disciple of Gian Piero Gasperini, having played under him and started his coaching career as his assistant. Their similar tactical philosophies feature a high-intensity, aggressive approach both with and without the ball, overlapping full-backs and quick transitions. Jurić also prefers the 3–4–2–1 formation and emphasizes discipline amongst his players.

== Personal life ==
Jurić is a self-described metalhead, with a passion for death metal music in particular. In a 2010 interview with the Italian edition of Rolling Stone, he cited Napalm Death, Obituary, Carcass, Death, Metallica, Megadeth, Ministry, Soundgarden, and Soulfly as some of his favourite artists. He occasionally attends rock and metal concerts.

== Managerial statistics ==
As of match played 8 November 2026

Managerial record by team and tenure
Team	From	To	Record							
Team	From	To	G	W	D	L	GF	GA	GD	Win %
Mantova	17 June 2014	9 June 2015	41	15	8	18	40	36	+4	36.59
Crotone	9 June 2015	28 June 2016	45	25	13	7	64	39	+25	55.56
Genoa	28 June 2016	19 February 2017	28	8	7	13	36	49	−13	28.57
Genoa	10 April 2017	5 November 2017	20	4	4	12	20	33	−13	20.00
Genoa	9 October 2018	6 December 2018	8	0	4	4	10	18	−8	0.00
Hellas Verona	14 June 2019	28 May 2021	79	23	26	30	98	106	−8	29.11
Torino	1 July 2021	30 June 2024	122	44	37	41	137	125	+12	36.07
Roma	18 September 2024	10 November 2024	12	4	3	5	15	17	−2	33.33
Southampton	23 December 2024	7 April 2025	16	2	1	13	15	38	−23	12.50
Atalanta	6 June 2025	10 November 2025	15	4	8	3	16	16	+0	26.67
Monza	29 June 2026	present	13	4	1	8	21	25	−4	30.77
Career total			399	133	112	154	472	502	−30	33.33

== Honours ==
=== Manager ===
Individual

- Panchina d'Argento: 2015–16
