= Domenico Toscano =

Italian footballer and manager (born 1971)

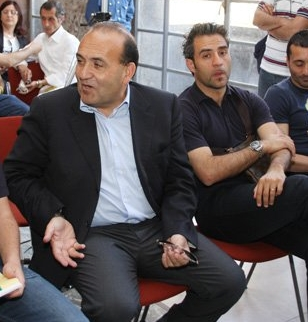
- Toscano in 2008

Personal information
- Date of birth: 4 August 1971 (age 55)
- Place of birth: Reggio Calabria, Italy
- Height: 1.74 m (5 ft 9 in)
- Position: Central midfielder

Youth career
- 1987–1989: Reggina

Senior career*
Years	Team	Apps	(Gls)
1989–1992	Reggina	3	(0)
1989–1990	→ Adelaide Nicastro (loan)	20	(0)
1990–1991	→ Treviso (loan)	19	(3)
1991–1992	→ Catanzaro (loan)	27	(0)
1992–1993	Potenza	20	(0)
1993–1997	Reggina	67	(6)
1997–1999	Cosenza	39	(5)
1999–2000	Lucchese	24	(0)
2000–2002	Lodigiani	47	(5)
2002–2003	Nocerina	26	(2)
2003–2005	Rende	36	(2)

Managerial career
- 2006–2007: Rende (youth)
- 2007–2010: Cosenza
- 2010: Cosenza
- 2011: Cosenza
- 2011–2013: Ternana
- 2014–2015: Novara
- 2015: Ternana
- 2016: Avellino
- 2018–2019: Feralpisalò
- 2019–2020: Reggina
- 2021–2022: Reggina
- 2022–2024: Cesena
- 2024–2026: Catania
- * Club domestic league appearances and goals

Domenico Toscano (born 4 August 1971) is an Italian football coach and former midfielder.

== Playing career ==
A youth product of hometown club Reggina, Toscano made his professional debut in 1989 with then-Serie C2 club Adelaide Nicastro. This was followed by another loan to fellow Serie C2 club Treviso, where he scored his first three goals as a professional in 19 appearances.

The following season, Toscano made his first three appearances for Reggina in Serie C1. Still, in November 1991, he moved down the category again on loan to Catanzaro, where he could play more regularly. The following year, he returned to Serie C1 and played 20 matches at Potenza.

In 1993, he returned to Reggio Calabria, in Serie C1, where he remained for four consecutive seasons. He obtained promotion to Serie B in 1994–95, finally making his debut in the Italian second division.

In 1997, Cosenza signed Toscano, with whom he earned his second promotion to Serie B. Toscano stayed with Cosenza for the following season, escaping relegation with the Rossoblu.

In October 1999, he moved back to Serie C1, joining Lucchese. He successively played two seasons with Rome-based Serie C1 club Lodigiani, before moving down the divisions with Nocerina of Serie C2, and then Rende, with whom he won a Serie D title and a consequent promotion to Serie C2 with the club before retiring in 2005.

== Coaching career ==
A year after retiring, Toscano became a coach and promptly returned to Rende, heading the Berretti Under-19s. In 2007 he was appointed as head coach at Serie D side Cosenza, with whom he won two consecutive promotions from Serie D to Lega Pro Prima Divisione before being sacked during the 2009–2010, also guiding the club to the final of the Coppa Italia Lega Pro, suffering a 2–5 aggregate loss to Lumezzane. He was subsequently reappointed in charge of Cosenza, only to be dismissed before the start of the new season.

On 29 June 2011, he became coach of Ternana, which in 2011–12 he led to promotion to Serie B, an outcome that also led to him winning the Silver Bench as the best Serie C manager of the season.

Confirmed in charge of Ternana for the following 2012–13 Serie B season, he led the Rossoverdi to ninth place in the second division while also being admitted to the UEFA Pro coaching course in Coverciano. On 31 December 2013, after a string of negative results, Toscano was dismissed from his Ternana coaching post.

On 3 July 2014, Toscano was hired as the new head coach of Novara in the Serie C league. On 10 May 2015, he won his second Serie C tournament, as he obtained promotion with Novara to Serie B, following a league win against Lumezzane. Two weeks later, Toscano lead Novara to the 2013–14 Supercoppa di Serie C. Despite his successes in charge of the club, Toscano left Novara by the end of the season.

On 17 July 2015, Toscano agreed to return to Ternana in the Serie B league. However, his second stint in Terni proved to be short and ended with his resignation on 23 September 2015.

On 4 June 2016, Toscano returned to Serie B as the head coach of Avellino. On 26 November 2016, due to disappointing results, the club sacked him; the experience in Campania ended with a total of 4 victories, 4 draws and 9 defeats in 17 official matches.

On 27 February 2018, after more than a year without a club, Toscano was named head coach of ambitious Serie C side Feralpisalò. On 7 May 2019, after the end of the regular season, he was relieved of his duties, together with his staff, before the start of the playoffs.

On 21 June 2019, Toscano was appointed coach of his hometown club, Reggina, on a two-year contract. Following the suspension of the regular season due to the COVID-19 pandemic, Toscano won the championship, guiding Reggina back to the second division after a six-year absence.

On 14 December 2020, after a complicated first part of the season, with the team in fifteenth place in Serie B, he was relieved of his duties a few hours after the home defeat against Venezia.

Exactly a year later, on 14 December 2021, Toscano returned to the bench of Reggina, replacing Alfredo Aglietti however, on 23 January 2022, just a month later, Toscano was relieved of his duties with the team in fourteenth place.

On 18 June 2022, Toscano returned to Serie C as he was named coach of Cesena on a two-year deal. On his first season in charge, Toscano led Cesena to a promotion playoff spot and was later confirmed for a second season, which ended with Cesena winning the league title on 30 March 2024, thus ensuring Toscano a fourth Serie B promotion in his career. Despite that, he parted ways with Cesena shortly afterwards, being then hired by ambitious Serie C club Catania as their new head coach.

== Honours ==
=== Player ===
Reggina

- Serie C1: 1994–95 (Group B)

Cosenza

- Serie C1: 1997–98 (Group B)

Rende

- Serie D: 2003–04 (Group I)

=== Manager ===
Cosenza

- Serie D: 2007–08 (Group I)
- Lega Pro Seconda Divisione: 2008–09 (Group C)

Ternana

- Lega Pro Prima Divisione: 2011–12 (Group A)

Novara

- Lega Pro: 2014–15 (Group A)
- Supercoppa Lega Pro: 2015

Reggina

- Serie C: 2019–20 (Group C)

Cesena

- Serie C: 2023–24 (Group B)

Individual

- Silver Bench: 2012
