= Davide Nicola =

Italian manager (born 1973)

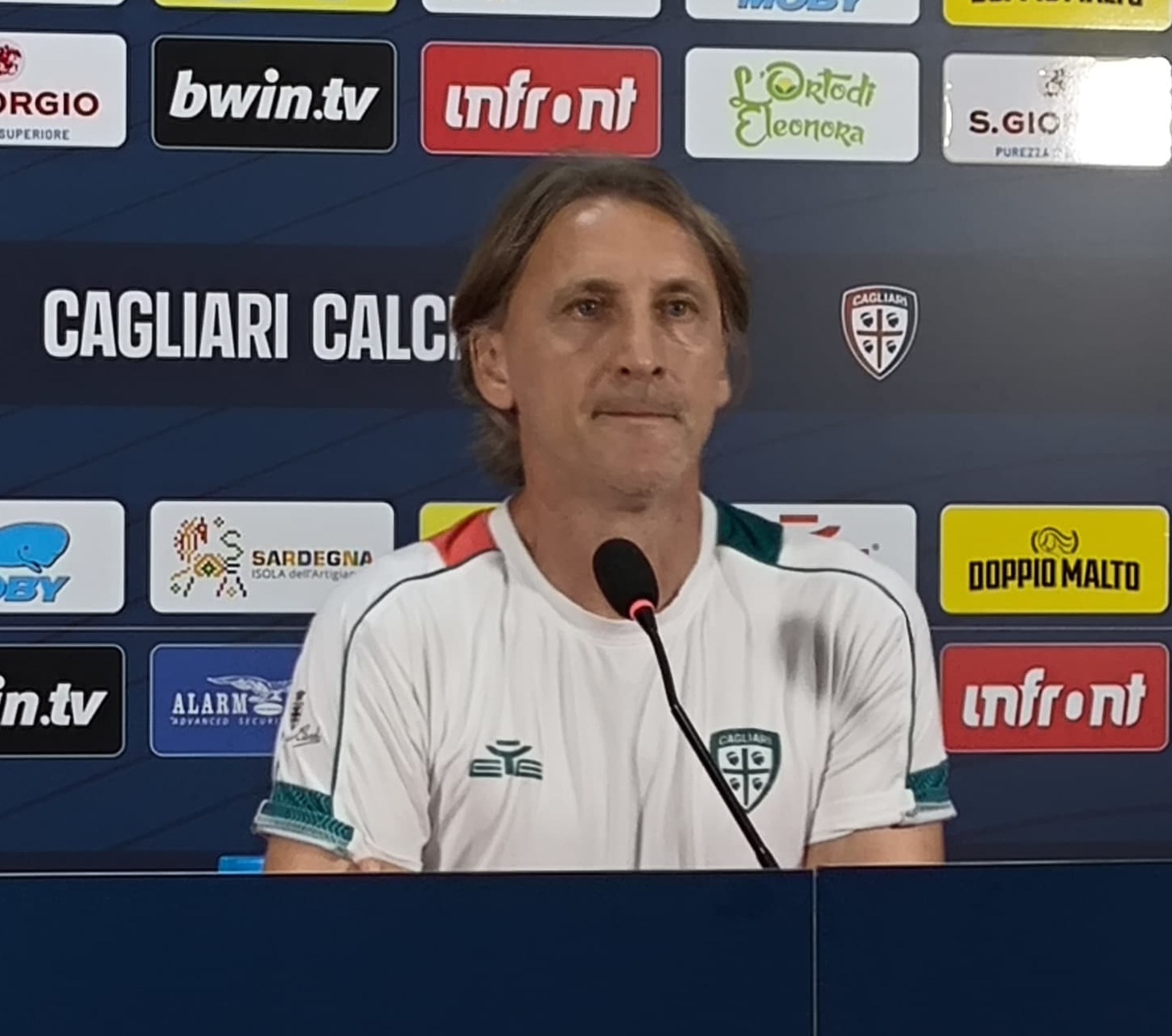
- Nicola with Cagliari in 2024

Personal information
- Full name: Davide Nicola
- Date of birth: 5 March 1973 (age 53)
- Place of birth: Luserna San Giovanni, Italy
- Height: 1.77 m (5 ft 10 in)
- Position: Defender

Team information
- Current team: Venezia (head coach)

Senior career*
Years	Team	Apps	(Gls)
1992–2001	Genoa	166	(4)
1993–1994	→ Fidelis Andria (loan)	26	(0)
1994–1995	→ Ancona (loan)	27	(0)
1998–1999	→ Pescara (loan)	7	(0)
2002–2005	Ternana	94	(5)
2004–2005	→ Siena (loan)	15	(0)
2005–2006	Torino	35	(1)
2006–2007	Spezia	28	(0)
2007–2008	Ravenna	14	(0)
2008–2011	Lumezzane	49	(1)
Total		461	(11)

Managerial career
- 2010–2012: Lumezzane
- 2012–2014: Livorno
- 2014: Livorno
- 2014–2015: Bari
- 2016–2017: Crotone
- 2018–2019: Udinese
- 2019–2020: Genoa
- 2021: Torino
- 2022–2023: Salernitana
- 2024: Empoli
- 2024–2025: Cagliari
- 2025–2026: Cremonese
- 2026–: Venezia
- * Club domestic league appearances and goals

Davide Nicola (born 5 March 1973) is an Italian professional football manager and former player who is the head coach of Serie A club Venezia.

== Club career ==
Nicola was born in Luserna San Giovanni.

During his time with Genoa, he was noted for kissing a policewoman on the sideline after a goal. He also helped the club to lift the 1996 Anglo-Italian Cup.

In the Serie B 2005–06 playoffs, he scored a goal that gained Torino promotion to Serie A. In the 2006–07 Serie B season, his good performances for Spezia in the last few games contributed to Spezia avoiding relegation.

He only played in the Serie A for one season in the 2004–05 season (15 games for Siena).

== Managerial career ==
In July 2010, Nicola retired from playing for Lumezzane in order to replace the outgoing head coach Leonardo Menichini. On 28 June 2011, his contract was renewed.

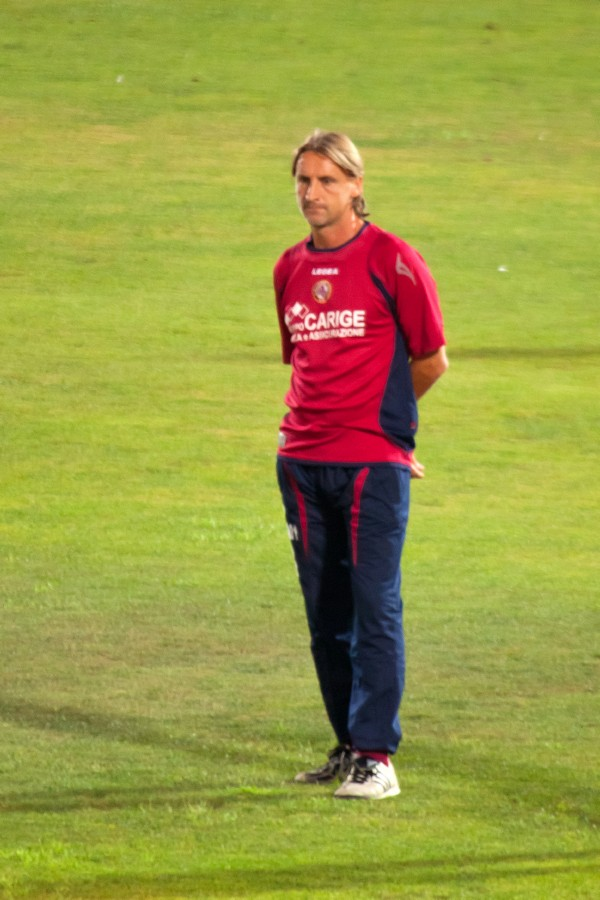
Nicola in 2012 with Livorno

During the 2012–13 season, Nicola became the head coach of Livorno in Serie B. In January 2014, Livorno sacked Nicola, with the club second-from-bottom in Serie A.

On 21 April 2014, Nicola was re-appointed as manager of Livorno.

On 17 November 2014, Nicola became the new manager of Bari.

On 23 June 2016, Nicola was appointed manager of Serie A newcomers Crotone. Nicola promised to ride a bicycle from Crotone to his home in Turin if they avoided relegation. Crotone finished in 17th place, two points above the relegation zone, and ahead of Empoli on the final matchday of the season, in what was hailed as a football miracle, as Crotone had collected only nine points in the whole first half of the season. Fulfilling the promise, Nicola rode 1300 km from Crotone to Turin on a bicycle.

On 13 November 2018, Nicola was appointed manager of Udinese.

On 28 December 2019, Nicola was appointed manager of Genoa.

On 19 January 2021, following the sacking of Marco Giampaolo, Nicola was appointed manager of Torino. In his first game in charge, Simone Zaza scored two second-half goals to help Torino draw 2–2 with Benevento, having been two goals down. After guiding Torino to escape relegation narrowly, he left the club at the end of the season.

On 15 February 2022, Nicola was appointed as the new head coach of Serie A relegation-battling club Salernitana until the end of the season. Under Nicola's tenure, Salernitana obtained 18 points in the remaining 15 matches and avoided relegation, another escape hailed as a miracle by the media. Nicola signed a new two-year contract with the club on 3 June 2022. He was later dismissed by the club on 16 January 2023, after a 8–2 loss away at Atalanta; only to be re-appointed just two days later. However, as results did not improve, Nicola was dismissed once again on 15 February 2023.

On 15 January 2024, Nicola was hired as the third head coach of the season for struggling Serie A team Empoli. After guiding Empoli to a last-minute escape from relegation, Nicola departed from the club by the end of the season.

On 5 July 2024, Nicola was announced as the new head coach of fellow Serie A club Cagliari on a two-year contract with an option to extend for one further year. After guiding the Sardinian team to safety in the 2024–25 Serie A, Nicola and Cagliari parted ways by the end of the season.

On 2 July 2025, Nicola was unveiled as the new head coach of newly-promoted Serie A club Cremonese, agreeing upon a two-year contract with the Grigiorossi.

On 14 October 2026, Serie A club Venezia FC announced the appointment of Nicola as the head coach on a two-year contract.

== Personal life ==
Nicola had a son, Alessandro, who died in a road accident in 2014, aged 14.

== Managerial statistics ==
As of match played 22 November 2026

Managerial record by team and tenure
Team	From	To	Record							
Team	From	To	G	W	D	L	GF	GA	GD	Win %
Lumezzane	13 July 2010	6 June 2012	77	28	20	29	78	80	−2	36.36
Livorno	6 June 2012	13 January 2014	69	29	18	22	103	87	+16	42.03
Livorno	19 April 2014	30 June 2014	4	0	0	4	3	10	−7	0.00
Bari	17 November 2014	31 December 2015	50	20	13	17	53	53	+0	40.00
Crotone	1 July 2016	6 December 2017	56	13	10	33	48	92	−44	23.21
Udinese	13 November 2018	20 March 2019	15	4	4	7	13	22	−9	26.67
Genoa	28 December 2019	26 August 2020	22	8	5	9	31	39	−8	36.36
Torino	19 January 2021	30 June 2021	20	5	9	6	24	34	−10	25.00
Salernitana	15 February 2022	15 February 2023	38	9	12	17	41	69	−28	23.68
Empoli	15 January 2024	2 July 2024	18	6	5	7	18	19	−1	33.33
Cagliari	5 July 2024	30 June 2025	41	11	9	21	44	61	−17	26.83
Cremonese	2 July 2025	18 March 2026	30	5	10	15	23	44	−21	16.67
Venezia	14 October 2026	Present	6	2	0	4	3	9	−6	33.33
Career total			446	140	115	191	482	619	−137	31.39

== Honours ==
=== Manager ===
Individual

- Serie A Coach of the Month: August 2025
