= Massimo Drago =

Italian footballer and coach

Personal information
- Date of birth: March 2, 1971 (age 55)
- Place of birth: Crotone, Italy
- Height: 1.76 m (5 ft 9 1/2 in)
- Position: Defender

Youth career
- Pescara

Senior career*
Years	Team	Apps	(Gls)
1988–1989	Kroton	33	(0)
1989–1990	Nola	27	(0)
1990–1991	Avellino	1	(0)
1991	Licata	4	(0)
1991–1992	Vigor Lamezia	31	(3)
1992–1994	Licata	60	(1)
1994–1996	Catania	52	(1)
1996–1999	Potenza	95	(9)
1999–2000	Castrovillari	27	(2)
2000–2001	Chieti	34	(0)
2001–2003	L'Aquila	57	(3)
2003–2004	Potenza	15	(0)

Managerial career
- 2012–2015: Crotone
- 2015–2016: Cesena
- 2019: Reggina
- * Club domestic league appearances and goals

Massimo Drago (born 2 March 1971) is an Italian professional football coach and a former player.

== Playing career ==
Born in Crotone, Drago started his career at hometown club Kroton in the Serie C2 league. In 1990–91, he had a short stint in Serie B with Avellino, which was his highest point as a footballer. He successively played at Serie C1, Serie C2 and Serie D levels with a variety of teams before retiring in 2004.

== Coaching career ==
After retiring as a player, Drago joined Crotone's coaching staff in 2005 as a youth coach for the Giovanissimi (under-15) level. In 2008, he was promoted as technical collaborator for the first team, and was successively named as assistant coach to Leonardo Menichini in 2011. After the latter's dismissal as head coach, Drago was then promoted new head coach of Crotone in January 2012, successfully guiding the Calabrian club to safety in the 2011–12 Serie B and being successively appointed as permanent manager by the end of the season.

Drago was admitted to the UEFA Pro Licence course in December 2012 due to his role as manager of a Serie B club. Under his tenure, Crotone achieved a twelfth place in the 2012–13 season and, then, an impressive sixth place in the 2013–14 Serie B, the best result in the club's history to date, thus qualifying for the promotion playoffs (then lost to Bari).

On 4 February 2019, Drago was appointed manager of Reggina. The adventure at Reggina lasted only 9 games. He was fired after a defeat to Sicula Leonzio on 4 April 2019, after only managing to get 9 points in 9 games.
