= Alessandro Dal Canto =

Italian footballer and manager (born 1975)

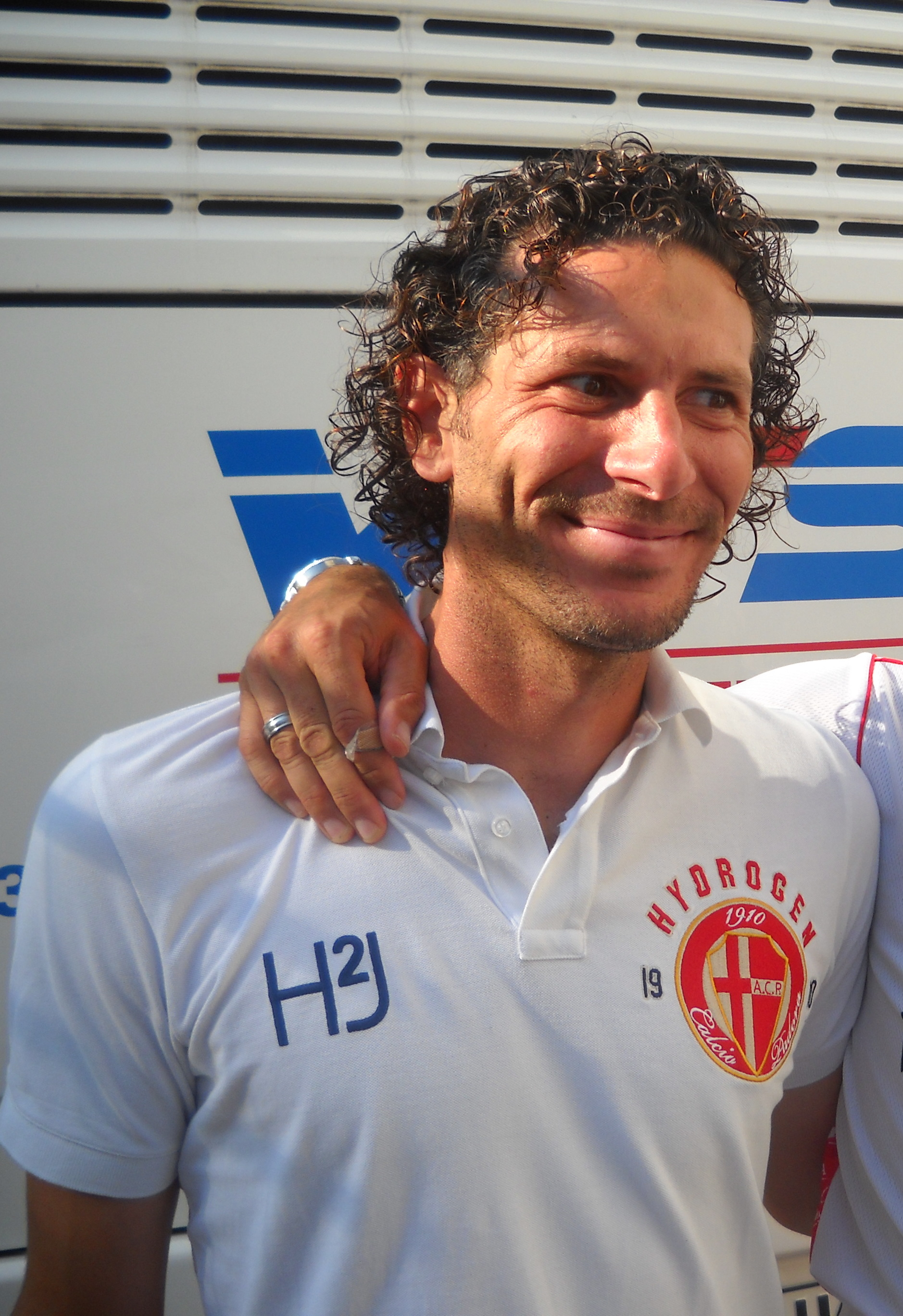

Personal information
- Date of birth: 10 March 1975 (age 51)
- Place of birth: Castelfranco Veneto, Italy
- Height: 1.77 m (5 ft 10 in)
- Position: Defender

Senior career*
Years	Team	Apps	(Gls)
1992–1994	Juventus	3	(0)
1994–1995	Vicenza	35	(1)
1995–1996	Torino	16	(1)
1996	Vicenza	2	(0)
1997–2000	Venezia	96	(2)
2000	Bologna	18	(0)
2000–2004	Vicenza	61	(1)
2003	Uralan Elista	21	(0)
2004–2005	Catanzaro	26	(0)
2006	Perugia	13	(0)
2006–2007	AlbinoLeffe	47	(0)
2007–2009	Treviso	30	(0)
Total		368	(5)

Managerial career
- 2011–2012: Padova
- 2013: Vicenza
- 2013–2014: Venezia
- 2015–2016: Italy U-17
- 2016–2017: Empoli Primavera
- 2017–2018: Juventus Primavera
- 2018–2019: Arezzo
- 2019–2020: Robur Siena
- 2020–2021: Livorno
- 2021: Viterbese
- 2022: Viterbese
- 2022–2024: Carrarese
- 2024–2025: Cittadella
- * Club domestic league appearances and goals

Alessandro Dal Canto (born 10 March 1975) is an Italian association football manager and a former player who played as a defender.

== Playing career ==
Dal Canto started his professional career with Juventus, with whom he played three Serie A games.

He successively joined Vicenza of Serie B, where he played a total of 35 matches. He then moved to Torino for a short time, playing 16 games in the top flight before returning to Vicenza and then moving to Venezia, where he spent three impressive seasons.

After a brief stint with Bologna, Dal Canto returned to Vicenza, where he also had the opportunity to establish himself at the European level.

The defender was one of the first Italians to play in Eastern Europe, specifically in Russia with Uralan Elista in 2003. This was followed by a fourth and final comeback at Vicenza, with 11 appearances. He then played at Serie B and Serie C1 level with Catanzaro, Perugia, AlbinoLeffe and Treviso.

He was also part of the Padania football selection in the VIVA World Cup 2008.

== Coaching career ==
After retiring as a footballer, Dal Canto took over at Padova, becoming the club's new under-19 youth coach. On 15 March 2011 Dal Canto was appointed temporary head coach of Padova, following the dismissal of head coach Alessandro Calori. In his first game in charge of the first team, he guided Padova to its first away win of the season, defeating Pescara 2–0. Club chairman Marcello Cestaro successively confirmed him as Padova head coach until the end of next season 2011–12.

He then served as head coach of Venezia in the Italian third tier (Lega Pro Prima Divisione, then unified to Lega Pro in 2014), from July 2013 to October 2014.

On 13 June 2018, he was named new head coach of Serie C club Arezzo.

On 4 July 2019, Dal Canto signed with Robur Siena.

Following Siena's bankruptcy, on 16 September 2020, he was hired by newly relegated Serie C club Livorno.

He was fired on 1 March 2021 following a string of negative results that left Livorno in last place in the league table, in a season that saw the club going through many serious financial issues that also led to a five-point deduction.

Dal Canto started the 2021–22 Serie C season in charge of Viterbese, but was dismissed on 4 October 2021 after seven games in charge. He was rehired as Viterbese coach on 6 March 2022.

On 11 July 2022, Dal Canto was unveiled as the new head coach of Serie C club Carrarese. He was dismissed on 16 January 2024.

On 14 October 2024, Dal Canto was hired as the new head coach of Serie B club Cittadella. He departed by the end of the season, after failing to save the team from relegation.
