= Andrea Agostinelli =

Italian footballer and coach (born 1957)

Personal information
- Date of birth: 20 April 1957 (age 69)
- Place of birth: Ancona, Italy
- Height: 1.74 m (5 ft 8 1/2 in)
- Position: Midfielder

Youth career
- 1973–1975: Lazio

Senior career*
| Years | Team | Apps | (Gls) |
| 1975–1979 | Lazio | 75 | (2) |
| 1979–1980 | Napoli | 9 | (0) |
| 1980–1981 | Pistoiese | 27 | (0) |
| 1981–1982 | Modena | 27 | (2) |
| 1982–1985 | Atalanta | 97 | (1) |
| 1985–1986 | Avellino | 30 | (1) |
| 1986–1987 | → Lecce (loan) | 27 | (1) |
| 1987 | Avellino | 0 | (0) |
| 1987–1988 | → Genoa (loan) | 18 | (0) |
| 1988–1990 | Mantova | 60 | (7) |
| 1990–1992 | Lodigiani | 64 | (4) |

International career
| | Italy military | 6 | (0) |
| 1976–1978 | Italy U21 | 12 | (0) |

Managerial career
- 1992–1993: Lodigiani (Assistant)
- 1994–1995: Latina
- 1995–1997: Astrea
- 1997–1998: Mantova
- 1998–2000: Pistoiese
- 2000–2001: Ternana
- 2002–2003: Piacenza
- 2003: Napoli
- 2004–2005: Crotone
- 2006–2007: Triestina
- 2007–2008: Salernitana
- 2010–2011: Portogruaro
- 2013–2015: Varese
- 2016: Partizani
- 2016: Skënderbeu
- 2022–2023: Gudja United
- 2023: Benevento
- 2024-2025: Flamurtari Vlorë
- * Club domestic league appearances and goals

Andrea Agostinelli (born 20 April 1957) is an Italian football coach and former professional footballer. He played as midfielder.

== Coaching career ==
In April 2013, he was hired by Varese as coach.

== Career statistics ==
As of 2022

| Team | From | To | Record | | | | |
| Team | From | To | G | W | D | L | Win % |
|---|---|---|---|---|---|---|---|
| Piacenza | 1 July 2002 | 3 February 2003 | 23 | 4 | 7 | 12 | 17.39 |
| Total | | | 23 | 4 | 7 | 12 | 17.39 |
