= Dario Marcolin =

Italian footballer, coach, and pundit (born 1971)

Personal information
- Date of birth: 28 October 1971 (age 55)
- Place of birth: Brescia, Italy
- Height: 1.80 m (5 ft 11 in)
- Position: Central midfielder

Senior career*
Years	Team	Apps	(Gls)
1989–1992	Cremonese	60	(5)
1992–2000	Lazio	70	(2)
1993–1994	→ Cagliari (loan)	18	(0)
1994–1995	→ Genoa (loan)	22	(2)
1999	→ Blackburn Rovers (loan)	10	(1)
2000–2002	Sampdoria	71	(2)
2002–2003	Piacenza	5	(0)
2003–2004	Napoli	47	(0)
2004–2005	Palazzolo	27	(4)
Total		330	(25)

International career
1989	Italy U-18	10	(0)
1992–1994	Italy U-21	22	(0)
1993–1994	Olympic Italy	10	(0)

Managerial career
- 2008: Monza
- 2012–2013: Modena
- 2013: Padova
- 2015: Catania
- 2016: Avellino
Medal record
Men's football
Representing Italy
UEFA European Under-21 Championship
Winner	1992 Europe
Winner	1994 France
- * Club domestic league appearances and goals

Dario Marcolin (born 28 October 1971) is an Italian football coach and former player, who played as a midfielder. He also worked as a football pundit after retiring.

== Club career ==
Marcolin was born in Brescia. During his career, he played for Cremonese, Lazio, Cagliari, Genoa, Blackburn Rovers (where he scored once against Manchester United at Old Trafford), Sampdoria, Piacenza, Napoli and Palazzolo.

== International career ==
At international level, Marcolin was never capped at senior level, but represented the Italy under-21 side on 22 occasions, making his debut in 1991 alongside his Cremonese teammate Mauro Bonomi, and winning the UEFA European Under-21 Championship in 1992, and in 1994, where he was named the team's captain. He also played in the 1992 Olympic football tournament.

== Style of play ==
An experienced central or defensive midfielder, Marcolin was usually deployed as a ball-winner due to his work-rate and stamina, or as a deep-lying playmaker, due to his good vision; however, he was also known for his lack of pace or notable athletic attributes, and in later years, as he struggled with fitness, was at times criticised for his poor work-rate in midfield. He was also known for his leadership.

== Coaching career ==
After retiring from football as a player, he became a coach, joining Brescia as an assistant coach in 2006, and then becoming first team coach at Inter alongside his former Lazio teammate Roberto Mancini.

In June 2008, he accepted his first managerial role at head of Lega Pro Prima Divisione club Monza, but was fired later that year in December.

In December 2009, he was appointed as assistant to Siniša Mihajlović at Catania. Mihajlović and Marcolin had already worked together as players with Lazio, and both as assistants to Mancini at Inter.

In the 2010–11 season, after Mihajlović joined Fiorentina, he followed him to became an assistant at the Florentine club.

On 12 July 2012, he was appointed new head coach of Serie B side Modena.

In July 2013, he took over at another Serie B club, Padova, replacing Fulvio Pea at the helm of the ambitious Venetians, but he was sacked on 28 September 2013 due to poor results.

On 3 January 2015, he was named new head coach of Serie B strugglers Catania.

== Honours ==
=== Player ===
==== Club ====
Lazio

- Serie A: 1999–2000
- Coppa Italia: 1997–98, 1999–2000
- Supercoppa Italiana: 1998, 2000
- UEFA Super Cup: 1999

==== International ====
Italy under-21

- UEFA European Under-21 Championship: 1992, 1994
