= Guido Ugolotti =

Italian footballer and coach

Personal information
- Date of birth: 28 August 1958 (age 68)
- Place of birth: Massa, Italy
- Height: 1.87 m (6 ft 1 1/2 in)
- Position: Forward

Team information
- Current team: Victoria Hotspurs F.C.

Senior career*
Years	Team	Apps	(Gls)
1975–1983	Roma	46	(11)
1980–1981	→ Avellino (loan)	13	(3)
1982–1983	→ Pisa (loan)	13	(3)
1983–1985	Campobasso	50	(7)
1985–1988	Arezzo	90	(21)
1988–1989	Latina	16	(1)
1989–1990	Brindisi	7	(1)
1990–1991	Potenza	14	(2)

International career
1978–1980	Italy U-21	6	(0)
1979–1980	Olympic Italy	3	(0)

Managerial career
- 2003–2004: Gela
- 2004–2006: Acireale
- 2006–2008: Sambenedettese
- 2008–2009: Arezzo
- 2010: Foggia
- 2010–2011: Siracusa
- 2011: Grosseto
- 2012: Grosseto
- 2012–2013: Benevento
- 2013–2014: Casertana
- 2014–2015: Savoia
- 2015–2016: Melfi
- 2017: Teramo
- 2018–2019: Floriana
- 2019–: Victoria Hotspurs F.C.
- * Club domestic league appearances and goals

Guido Ugolotti (born 28 August 1958) is an Italian professional football coach and a former player, current coach of the Gozitan team Victoria Hotspurs

== Career ==
=== Player ===
Ugolotti was born in Massa. As a player, he spent eight seasons (72 games, 17 goals) in the Serie A with Roma, Avellino and Pisa.

=== Coach ===
After serving as youth coach at Roma for 12 years, Ugolotti started a head coaching career of his own at Gela, then going on to stay in Sicily at Acireale. He successively served as head coach at Serie C1 clubs Sambenedettese, Arezzo, Foggia and Siracusa.

In June 2011 he took his first head coaching role in the Serie B, accepting an offer from Grosseto for the 2011–12 season. He was dismissed from his coaching post on 30 October. On 1 February 2012 he was recalled by the same team as head coach, but on 14 May 2012 he was again sacked.

On 15 October 2012, he was named new coach of Benevento, but on 18 January 2013 he was sacked.

On 16 September 2013, he was appointed to replace Ezio Capuano as new boss of Lega Pro Seconda Divisione club Casertana, and guided the club to ensure a spot in the inaugural season of the unified Lega Pro division, leaving his role by the end of the season.

On 28 October 2014, he was named head coach of newly promoted Lega Pro club Savoia in place of Giovanni Bucaro.

After a short spell in Floriana, on 31 December 2019 Ugolotti signed a contract with Victoria Hotspurs until the end of the season.

== Honours ==
- Coppa Italia winner: 1979–80.
- Represented Italy at the 1980 UEFA European Under-21 Football Championship
