= Gianluca Atzori =

Italian football manager (born 1971)

Personal information
- Date of birth: 6 March 1971 (age 55)
- Place of birth: Collepardo, Italy
- Height: 1.84 m (6 ft 0 in)
- Position: Defender

Team information
- Current team: Scafatese (head coach)

Senior career*
Years	Team	Apps	(Gls)
1988–1990	Lodigiani	21	(0)
1990–1991	Torino	0	(0)
1991–1993	Ternana	50	(0)
1993–1996	Perugia	63	(1)
1996–1997	Reggina	24	(0)
1997–2001	Ravenna	110	(7)
2001–2003	Empoli	35	(3)
2003–2004	Palermo	17	(0)

Managerial career
- 2004: Parma (assistant)
- 2005–2006: Lecce (assistant)
- 2007–2008: Catania (assistant)
- 2008–2009: Ravenna
- 2009: Catania
- 2010–2011: Reggina
- 2011: Sampdoria
- 2013: Spezia
- 2013: Reggina
- 2013–2014: Reggina
- 2015: Siena
- 2017: Pistoiese
- 2017–2018: Pro Vercelli
- 2019–2020: Imolese
- 2021–2023: Floriana
- 2024–: Scafatese
- * Club domestic league appearances and goals

Gianluca Atzori (born 6 March 1971) is an Italian football manager and former player, currently in charge of Serie D club Scafatese.

== Career ==
=== Playing ===
Atzori started his professional playing career with Rome-based Serie C side Lodigiani in 1988, then playing mostly at Serie B level with several teams, including Perugia, Reggina and most notably Ravenna, where he spent a total four season. In 2001, he joined Empoli, being a protagonist of the Tuscans' successful 2001–02 Serie B campaign which saw the team being crowned league winners under head coach Silvio Baldini. He then played another season with Empoli in his personal first (and only) Serie A season. In 2003, he followed Silvio Baldini at Palermo, who later won the Serie B title in 2003–04; he played only 17 league games out of 46 with the rosanero, being relegated to the bench after Silvio Baldini's dismissal from the head coaching post.

=== Coaching ===
After being released by Palermo in June 2004, Atzori chose to retire from football and instead focus on a management career, becoming Silvio Baldini's assistant at Parma. He then followed again Baldini also in his unsuccessful stints at Lecce (2005–06) and Catania (2007–08), both ended in his boss and mentor being sacked in mid-season. However, after Baldini was sacked from Catania in April 2008, Atzori decided instead to stay under new boss Walter Zenga.

In June 2008, Atzori left Catania to accept a head coaching offer from Lega Pro Prima Divisione side Ravenna, a team where he had already spent four seasons as a player. He guided Ravenna through a very impressive season and qualification into promotion playoffs, where Ravenna was defeated by Padova in the semi-finals.

On 10 June 2009, Atzori accepted to return to Catania, this time as head coach, for the upcoming 2009–10 season, thus replacing his former head coach Walter Zenga at the helm of the rossoazzurri. However, his time back at Catania lasted only fifteen games, as he was dismissed on 8 December due to poor results.

On 16 June 2010 Serie B club Reggina announced Gianluca Atzori as the club's new head coach, replacing Roberto Breda.

On 9 June 2011, Atzori was named as the new head coach of Sampdoria have been relegated to Serie B, signing a two-year contract. After a disappointing start of season, with Sampdoria in seventh place despite being tipped as one of the leading direct promotion candidates during pre-season, Atzori was ultimately sacked on 13 November 2011.

On 4 January 2013, he was named the new coach of Spezia in Serie B in place of the sacked Michele Serena. His stint was, however, short-lived as he was sacked weeks later due to poor results and replaced by Luigi Cagni.

In June 2013, he was named the new head coach of the Serie B club Reggina, thus marking a personal second stint at the Calabrian club. He was sacked in October 2013 and replaced by Fabrizio Castori, but reinstated in December 2013.

He successively served as head coach of Serie B club Pro Vercelli from December 2017 to January 2018, in a short but unsuccessful stint in charge of the Bianche Casacche.

On 27 September 2019 he was hired by Serie C club Imolese. He left Imolese at the end of the 2019–20 season.

On 17 June 2021 Atzori has been appointed as head coach of the Maltese Premier League side Floriana. On 10 May 2023, after two years with the Maltese club during which he won the 2021–22 Maltese FA Trophy, Atzori parted ways with Floriana. He successively declared to have left the club due to unpaid wages, not having received a salary since January 2023, despite still having another year of contract with Floriana.

On 2 December 2024, Atzori returned to Italy as the new head coach of ambitious Serie D amateurs Scafatese.

== Honours ==
=== Manager ===
Floriana

- Maltese FA Trophy: 2021–22
