= Mario Petrone =

Italian football manager (born 1973)

Mario Petrone (born 20 March 1973) is an Italian football manager and former player.

== Early life ==
Petrone retired from playing football due to injury.

== Career ==
Petrone managed Italian side Nuorese, helping the club achieve promotion.

== Managerial style ==
Petrone is known for his man-management ability.

== Personal life ==
Petrone is a native of Naples, Italy.
