= Claudio Foscarini =

Italian football coach (born 1958)

Personal information
- Date of birth: 19 November 1958 (age 67)
- Place of birth: Treviso, Italy
- Height: 1.75 m (5 ft 9 in)
- Position: Midfielder

Senior career*
Years	Team	Apps	(Gls)
1975–1979	Calcio Montebelluna		
1979–1981	Treviso		
1981–1983	Atalanta		
1984	Calcio Campania		
1984–1986	Piacenza		
1986–1991	Virescit Boccaleone		

Managerial career
- 1997–2001: Alzano Virescit
- 2001–2002: Rimini
- 2005–2015: Cittadella
- 2015–2016: Pro Vercelli
- 2016–2017: Livorno
- 2018: Avellino
- 2018: Padova
- 2023: AlbinoLeffe
- * Club domestic league appearances and goals

Claudio Foscarini (born 19 November 1958) is an Italian football coach and former player.

== Career ==
=== Early career ===
Foscarini started his coaching career as youth coach for Virescit Boccaleone (who later merged with Alzano to form Alzano Virescit) in 1991, and then as head coach and technical director of amateur clubs Stezzanese and Verdello. He was appointed head coach of Alzano Virescit in January 1997, and guided the club to a Serie C1/A championship title in 1999, with consequent promotion to Serie B. Alzano's tenure in the Serie B league lasted only a lone season, as his side was relegated in 1999–2000 and Foscarini himself was sacked later in March 2001 after failing to bring his side back to the top. Foscarini then served as head coach of Serie C2 club Rimini, where he failed to win the promotion playoffs with the Romagna side.

=== Cittadella ===
In 2003, he was appointed youth coach of Cittadella, being then promoted as head coach later in July 2005, after Rolando Maran left to become Brescia's new boss. In 2008, Foscarini guided Cittadella to a second Serie B promotion in the whole club history, after entering the promotion playoffs as outsiders and then defeating Cremonese in the final. He was confirmed for the club's first campaign back to the Italian second division in 2008–09, in which he managed to save Cittadella from relegation.

Cittadella's second Serie B season in 2009–10 proved to be far more successful, as Citta' found themselves well into the battle for a potentially historical promotion to the top flight, qualifying for the promotion playoff, then lost to Brescia in the semi-finals. In 2010–11, Cittadella maintained their place in the second division, ending the season in 14th place and ensuring him a one-year contract extension. He left Cittadella by the end of the 2014–15 season, after failing to save his team from relegation to Lega Pro.

=== Pro Vercelli and Livorno ===
In October 2015, Foscarini returned into management as the new head coach of Serie B strugglers Pro Vercelli, guiding them to safety by the end of the season. Not confirmed by Pro Vercelli, in June 2016 he accepted an offer from Livorno with the goal to bring the recently relegated Lega Pro club back to Serie B.

=== Avellino ===
He was appointed manager of Serie B club Avellino on 3 April 2018. After saving Avellino from relegation by the end of the season, he was not confirmed due to the club's exclusion from the league because of administrative issues.

=== Padova ===
On 6 November 2018, he was named head coach of newly-promoted Serie B club Padova to replace Pierpaolo Bisoli. He was sacked on 28 December 2018 following a series of negative results.

=== AlbinoLeffe ===
On 21 February 2023, after more than four years without a club, Foscarini returned to management as the new head coach of Serie C club AlbinoLeffe. Foscarini left AlbinoLeffe by the end of the season, after guiding them to defeat Mantova in the relegation playoffs.
