= Fulvio Pea =

Italian football coach (born 1967)

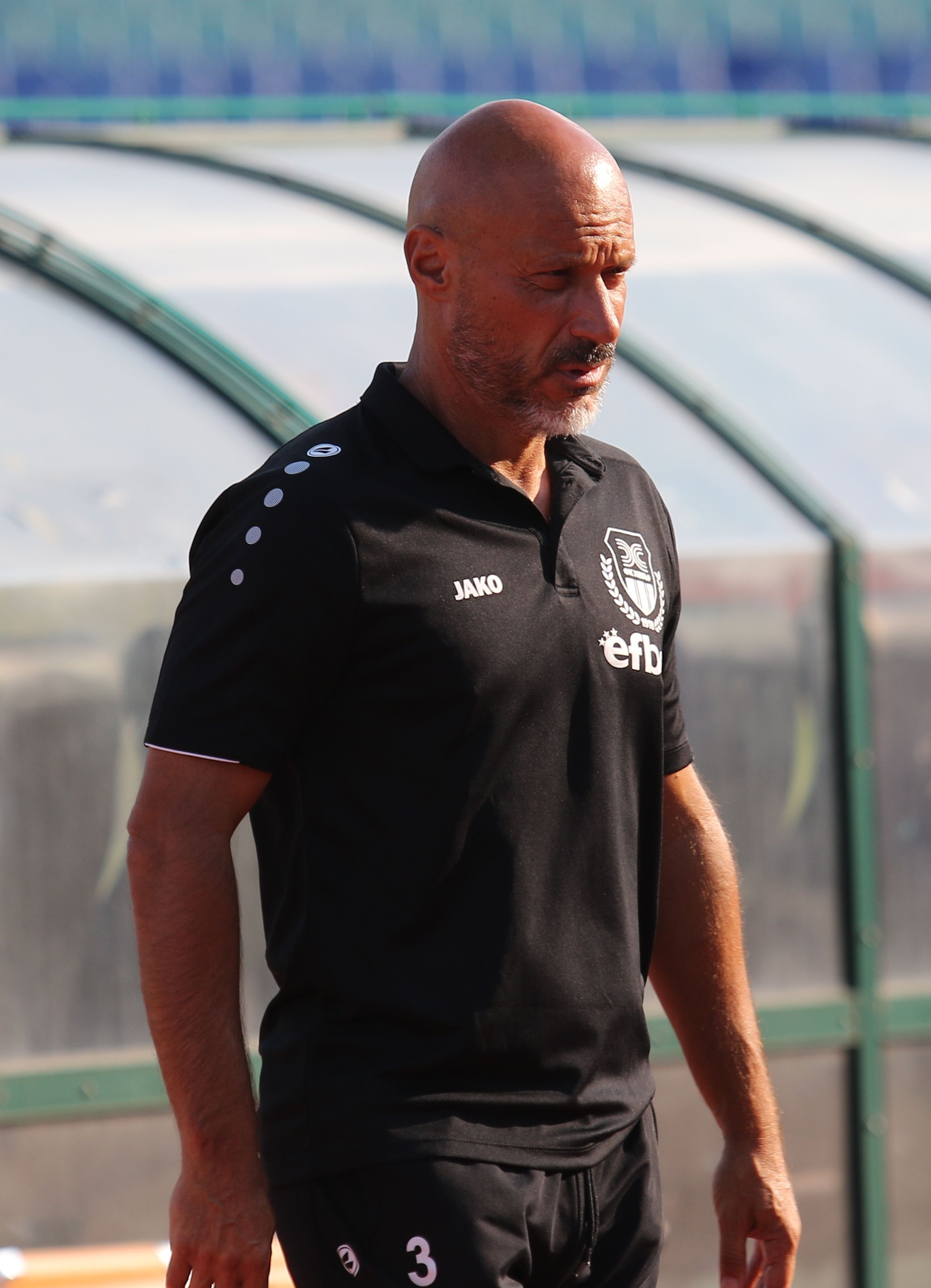

Personal information
- Date of birth: 10 February 1967 (age 59)
- Place of birth: Casalpusterlengo, Italy

Team information
- Current team: Inter Milan (technical director of youth department)

Managerial career
- Years: Team
- 1989–1995: Fanfulla (youth)
- 1995–1998: Alcione (youth)
- 1998–2000: Inter Milan (U12)
- 2000–2001: Ravenna (youth)
- 2002: CSKA Sofia (youth)
- 2002–2003: Ancona (assistant)
- 2003–2004: Napoli (assistant)
- 2004–2005: Siena (assistant)
- 2005–2007: Lucchese
- 2007–2009: Sampdoria (U19)
- 2009–2011: Inter Milan (U19)
- 2011–2012: Sassuolo
- 2012: Padova
- 2013: Padova
- 2013–2014: Juve Stabia
- 2014–2015: Monza
- 2015–2016: Cremonese
- 2016–2018: Pro Piacenza
- 2021: Nanjing City
- 2022: FC Hebar

Fulvio Pea (born 10 February 1967) is an Italian football coach.

== Career ==
=== Coaching ===
==== The first experiences ====
Pea has no playing experience whatsoever, as he entered directly into coaching in 1989 as youth coach of Fanfulla, when aged 22. He then took the same role at Milan-based youth club Alcione. In 1998, he was appointed in charge of the Esordienti youth team at Inter, then filling the same role at Ravenna. In 2001, he moved to Bulgaria to join Luigi Simoni at CSKA Sofia, working alongside him also in his following experiences at Ancona, Napoli and Siena. In 2005, he took his first head coaching role, as boss of Lucchese, with Simoni as technical director.

In June 2007, he was appointed new Primavera youth coach of Sampdoria by Giuseppe Marotta, winning the Campionato Nazionale Primavera and the Coppa Italia Primavera in 2008. In 2009, he left Sampdoria to become new Primavera coach at Inter, managing to win a Torneo di Viareggio championship in 2011.

==== Serie B ====
He left Inter in the summer of 2011 to accept the head coaching position of ambitious Serie B side Sassuolo, guiding the small Emilian club into the race for a historical promotion to the Italian top flight, coming up to the semifinal playoffs.

From the 10 June 2012 to the 17 December 2012 he was the head coach of Padova, still in Serie B. He was reinstated as manager of Padova on 20 March 2013, and left the club by the end of the season.

Later, he was appointed as head coach of bottom-placed Serie B club Juve Stabia in November 2013, where he failed to turn the team's fortunes and was sacked shortly thereafter.

==== Serie C ====
He was head coach of Lega Pro club Monza for the 2014–15 season. After spending one year with Monza, Pea became head coach of Cremonese, until leaving the club in January 2016. Pea then became the head coach of Pro Piacenza, having joined in July 2016. He renewed the contract in June 2017. He was relieved of his duties on 15 April 2018.

==== Nanjing City and FC Hebar ====
On 13 April 2021, Pea became head coach of Nanjing City.

On 13 June 2022, Pea was announced as the head coach of newly promoted Bulgarian First Professional Football League club, FC Hebar.

== Honours ==
Sampdoria Primavera

- Campionato Nazionale Primavera: 2007–08
- Coppa Italia Primavera: 2007–08
- Supercoppa Primavera: 2008

Inter Milan Primavera

- Torneo di Viareggio: 2011
