= Marcello Cestaro =

Italian footballer

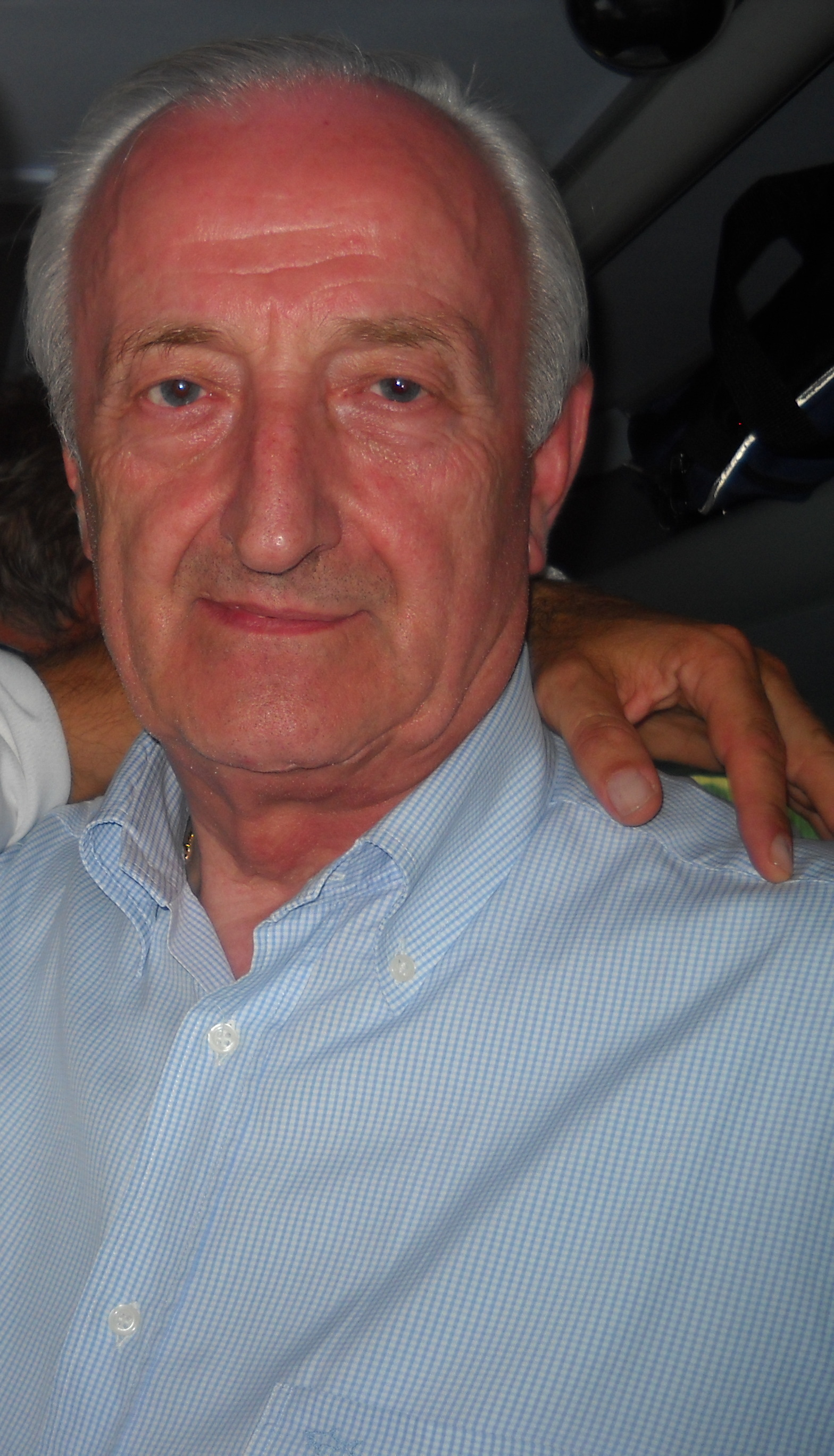
Marcello Cestaro

Marcello Cestaro (born 1938) is an Italian businessman and the current owner and chairman of Serie A1 women's basketball club Pallacanestro Femminile Schio. He is a native of Schio, Vicenza, Italy. Until June 2013, he was also owner and chairman of Serie B club Calcio Padova.

Cestaro has business interest in supermarket and hypermarket, with the brands Famila, Emisfero, A&O and Cash and Carry managed by his company Unicomm Srl. He entered into football in 2004, detecting the Calcio Padova militant at time in Series C1. Since 1986, he has also been the owner of Pallacanestro Femminile Schio.
