= FC Crotone =

Italian professional football club

Crotone
- Full name: Football Club Crotone S.r.l.
- Nicknames: I Pitagorici (The Pythagoreans); Gli Squali or Lo Squalo Calabrese (The Sharks or The Shark of Calabria); Rossoblù (Red and Blue)
- Founded: 1910; 116 years ago
- Ground: Stadio Ezio Scida
- Capacity: 16,647
- Chairman: Gianni Vrenna
- Head coach: Leandro Greco
- League: Serie C Group C
- 2025–26: Serie C Group C, 6th of 20
- Website: www.fccrotone.it
| Home colours | Away colours | Third colours |

Football Club Crotone S.r.l., commonly referred to as Crotone, is an Italian football club based in Crotone, Calabria. They play in the third division of Italian football, the Serie C. Founded on 20 September 1910, it holds its home games at Stadio Ezio Scida, which has a 16,647-seat capacity.

== History ==
The club is based in the ancient Greek settlement of Kroton, one of the first Greek colonies in what is now known as modern day Italy. The club is proud of their Greek origins with their banners and slogans and regularly depicting Greek icons such as soldiers of Sparta.

The first team from Crotone, Società sportiva Crotona, was founded on 20 September 1910, but without adhering to Italian Football Federation, and the following main teams of Crotone, like Milone Crotone, did not participate before 1921 in several minor leagues including Prima Divisione (which later would be known as Serie C). Following World War II, a new club, Unione Sportiva Crotone replaced the previous one, playing seven seasons in Serie C.

In 1963, the club was relegated to Serie D, but returned to the third division the following year, remaining there for fourteen consecutive seasons, missing promotion in 1977 when finishing third behind Bari and Paganese. In 1978, following the Italian football league reorganisation, Crotone was relegated to Serie C2 and the following year was declared bankrupt. A new club, Associazione Sportiva Crotone, began competing again in the Prima Categoria (eighth division).

Crotone was promoted to Serie C2 in 1984–85, but only for one season. The team's name was changed to Kroton Calcio, and the club was promoted again to C2 after the 1986–87 season, where it played until 1991. A second bankruptcy led to the foundation of Football Club Crotone Calcio with Raffaele Vrenna as chairman, starting in the Promozione (7th level). Crotone gained successive promotions to Serie C2 and C1, winning in the play-offs against Locri and Benevento, respectively.

Under Antonello Cuccureddu, Crotone first reached Serie B in 2000, returning to the second level two seasons later. Again in division two in 2004, after disposing of Viterbese in the promotion play-offs, it remained in the category until the 2006–07 season.

After being beaten by Taranto in the 2008 play-offs, Crotone returned to the second division the following season, defeating Benevento.

The team was promoted to Serie A, the Italian top flight, for the first time in its history in 2016. In the 2016–17 season, the club finished 17th, securing a place in the next Serie A season. This was despite the Calabrian side only winning two points from the first ten matches, one of the poorest starts the Italian top-flight had seen in years. Crotone remained in the relegation positions for almost the entire season before an impressive revival saw the club achieve a seven-match unbeaten run from matchdays 30 to 36, including five wins in that time, and the season was concluded with a 3-1 victory over Lazio on the last matchday, a result that saw Crotone jump above Empoli to 17th place and thus secured another season in Serie A in what was hailed as a football miracle, led by 13-goal top scorer Diego Falcinelli and coach Davide Nicola.

In the following season, Crotone failed to avoid relegation after losing against Napoli in the last match of the Serie A campaign, returning to Serie B after two seasons.

Following the 2019–20 season, the club was promoted to Serie A once more in second place, only behind Benevento in the table. However, the club's top-flight campaign was less than satisfactory. After spending the majority of the season in the last spot of the table, and losing incredible matches that were an early indicator of the hardship the club would endure, Crotone was mathematically relegated to Serie B after 34 games, following a loss to would-be champions Inter. This relegation came in contrast with several excellent performances from individual players, particularly striker Simy, who scored 20 league goals during the season, a record for a relegated team. Nevertheless, the 92 goals Crotone conceded was one more than Casale conceded in 1933–34, setting a new Serie A record for goals against in a single season.

To reduce wage bills following relegation to Serie B, the club loaned out attacking midfielder Junior Messias to AC Milan with an option for the latter to buy, and striker Simy to Salernitana (sold to the latter in January 2022). The team's attacking power weakened. Crotone finished 19th in the league and suffered a second successive relegation to 2022–23 Serie C.

In September 2025, the club was placed in judicial administration, due to the ’Ndrangheta infiltrating the club's security and ticketing operations.

== Recent seasons ==
| Season | Division | Tier | Pos | Pl | W | D | L | + | - | P | Cup | Note |
|---|---|---|---|---|---|---|---|---|---|---|---|---|
| 2016–17 | Serie A | I | 17 | 38 | 9 | 7 | 22 | 34 | 58 | 34 | 3rd round | |
| 2017–18 | Serie A | I | ↓ 18 | 38 | 9 | 8 | 21 | 21 | 40 | 35 | 4th round | Relegated to Serie B |
| 2018–19 | Serie B | II | 12 | 36 | 11 | 10 | 15 | 40 | 42 | 43 | 4th round | |
| 2019–20 | Serie B | II | ↑ 2 | 38 | 20 | 8 | 10 | 63 | 40 | 68 | 3rd round | Promoted to Serie A |
| 2020–21 | Serie A | I | ↓ 19 | 38 | 6 | 5 | 27 | 45 | 92 | 23 | 3rd round | Relegated to Serie B |
| 2021–22 | Serie B | II | ↓ 19 | 38 | 4 | 14 | 20 | 41 | 61 | 26 | 2nd round | Relegated to Serie C |
| 2022–23 | Serie C (Group C) | III | 2 | 38 | 23 | 11 | 4 | 57 | 31 | 80 | – | Eliminated in the Promotion play-offs quarterfinals to Foggia |
| 2023–24 | Serie C (Group C) | III | 9 | 38 | 13 | 13 | 12 | 54 | 47 | 52 | 1st round | Eliminated in the Promotion play-offs 1/32-finals to Picerno |
| 2024–25 | Serie C (Group C) | III | 4 | 34 | 15 | 9 | 10 | 62 | 49 | 54 | – | Eliminated in the Promotion play-offs quarterfinals to Vicenza |
| 2025–26 | Serie C (Group C) | III | 6 | 38 | 18 | 7 | 13 | 59 | 40 | 61 | – | Eliminated in the Promotion play-offs 1/16-finals to Casertana |

== Colours and badge ==
Team colours are dark blue and white, due to their Greek origins, and also red. The club's kits are traditionally dark blue and red stripes. Some of the team's mottos are "Salutate la Magna Grecia" ("Salute Greater Greece") and "Noi siamo la Magna Grecia" ("We are Greater Greece"). Fans of FC Crotone pride themselves as being ”La Capitale Della Magna Grecia” ("The capital of Greater Greece"). The team's nickname is "the Pythagoreans", deriving from the well-known Greek philosopher Pythagoras.

== Rivalries ==
FC Crotone has a fierce rivalry against LFA Reggio Calabria in what's called the "Magna Graecia derby". The club also maintains rivalries against Cosenza Calcio and US Catanzaro 1929.

== Players ==
=== Current squad ===
As of 31 August 2026

Note: Flags indicate national team as defined under FIFA eligibility rules; some limited exceptions apply. Players may hold more than one non-FIFA nationality.

| No. | Pos. | Nation | Player |
|---|---|---|---|
| 1 | GK | ITA | Davide Merelli |
| 5 | MF | ITA | Lorenzo Russo (on loan from Napoli) |
| 8 | MF | ESP | Iker Torres |
| 9 | FW | ROU | Bogdan Stăuciuc |
| 10 | FW | ITA | Antonino Musso |
| 12 | GK | ITA | Antonio Pio Martino |
| 13 | DF | ITA | Nicolò Armini |
| 16 | MF | ITA | Gesualdo Napolitano |
| 17 | MF | ITA | Diego Russo |
| 18 | FW | ITA | Mattia Tordini |
| 19 | DF | ITA | William Feola (on loan from Hellas Verona) |
| 21 | MF | ITA | Fabrizio Marazzotti |
| 22 | GK | ITA | Alberto Lucano |

| No. | Pos. | Nation | Player |
|---|---|---|---|
| 23 | DF | ITA | Filippo Groppelli |
| 25 | DF | ITA | Walter Guerra |
| 26 | DF | ARG | Gregorio Tanco |
| 31 | MF | ARG | Pedro Rodríguez |
| 44 | DF | ITA | Luis Pierangeli |
| 63 | DF | ITA | Angelo Veltri |
| 77 | FW | ITA | Michele Vrenna |
| 80 | MF | ITA | Filippo Grosso (on loan from Frosinone) |
| 83 | MF | ITA | Zak Ruggiero |
| 90 | FW | COD | Arthur Spadoni (on loan from Avellino) |
| 96 | FW | ITA | Marco Zunno |
| 99 | MF | ITA | Francesco Crapisto (on loan from Juventus) |

=== Out on loan ===
Note: Flags indicate national team as defined under FIFA eligibility rules; some limited exceptions apply. Players may hold more than one non-FIFA nationality.

| No. | Pos. | Nation | Player |
|---|---|---|---|
| — | DF | ITA | Giovanni D'Aprile (at Mġarr United until 30 June 2027) |
| — | MF | ITA | Andrea Gallo (at Foggia until 30 June 2027) |

| No. | Pos. | Nation | Player |
|---|---|---|---|
| — | FW | ITA | Antonio Energe (at Cosenza until 30 June 2027) |

== Coaching staff ==
| Position | Name |
|---|---|
| Head coach | (Italy) Emilio Longo |
| Assistant coach | (Italy) Vincenzo Migliaccio |
| Assistant coach | (Italy) Giuseppe Brescia |
| Goalkeeper coach | (Italy) Nicola Barasso |
| Fitness coach | (Italy) Fabio Allevi |
| Fitness coach | (Italy) Elmiro Trombino |
| Physiotherapist | (Italy) Armando Cistaro |
| Physiotherapist | (Italy) Matteo Errico |
| Physiotherapist | (Italy) Riccardo Pupo |
| Chief doctor | (Italy) Massimo Iera |
| Club doctor | (Italy) Massimo Bisceglia |

== Managers ==
- (Italy) Giorgio Tricoli (1954–1955)
- (Italy) Bruno Giordano (1996–1997)
- (Italy) Antonello Cuccureddu (1999–2001)
- (Italy) Giuseppe Papadopulo (2000–2001)
- (Italy) Antonio Cabrini (2001)
- (Italy) Stefano Cuoghi (2001–2002)
- (Italy) Franco Selvaggi (2002)
- (Italy) Gian Piero Gasperini (2003–2004)
- (Italy) Andrea Agostinelli (2004–2005)
- (Italy) Gian Piero Gasperini (2005–2006)
- (Italy) Elio Gustinetti (2006–2007)
- (Italy) Guido Carboni (2007)
- (Italy) Francesco Moriero (2008–2009)
- (Italy) Franco Lerda (2009–2010)
- (Italy) Leonardo Menichini (2010)
- (Italy) Eugenio Corini (2010–2011)
- (Italy) Leonardo Menichini (2010–2012)
- (Italy) Massimo Drago (2012–2015)
- (Croatia) Ivan Jurić (2015–2016)
- (Italy) Davide Nicola (2016–2017)
- (Italy) Walter Zenga (2017–2018)
- (Italy) Giovanni Stroppa (2018–2021)
- (Italy) Serse Cosmi (2021)
- (Italy) Francesco Modesto (2021)
- (Italy) Pasquale Marino (2021)
- (Italy) Francesco Modesto (2021-)
