= Leonardo Menichini =

Italian footballer (born 1953)

Personal information
- Date of birth: 11 December 1953 (age 72)
- Place of birth: Ponsacco, Italy
- Position: Defender

Senior career*
| Years | Team | Apps | (Gls) |
| 1974–1975 | Verona | 2 | (0) |
| 1975–1976 | Novara | 29 | (0) |
| 1976–1978 | Roma | 52 | (0) |
| 1978–1981 | Catanzaro | 73 | (0) |
| 1982–1985 | Ascoli | | |
| 1985–1987 | Triestina | | |

Managerial career
- 2003: Ancona
- 2005: Sassari Torres
- 2005: Tirana
- 2008–2010: Lumezzane
- 2010: Crotone
- 2010–2012: Crotone
- 2012–2013: Grosseto
- 2014: Pisa
- 2014–2016: Salernitana
- 2016–2017: Reggiana
- 2018: Lucchese
- 2019: Salernitana
- 2021–2023: Monterosi
- 2024: Turris
- 2024–2025: Pontedera
- * Club domestic league appearances and goals

Leonardo Menichini (born 11 December 1953) is an Italian football manager and former player.

== Playing career ==
A defender, Menichini played for several top-flight teams, including AS Roma and Catanzaro, the latter under coach Carlo Mazzone.

== Coaching career ==
Following his retirement from playing football, Menichini became a coach, serving alongside Carlo Mazzone from 1993 to 2003 with top-flight teams such as Cagliari, AS Roma, Napoli, Bologna, Perugia and Brescia. In 2003, he accepted an offer from newly promoted Serie A team Ancona to become the biancorossi's boss; however, his first experience as head coach proved to be unsuccessful, since he was sacked after four weeks in charge of the team.

In February 2005, Menichini returned into football, replacing Salvo D'Adderio at the helm of Sassari Torres, who were in danger of relegation in the Serie C1, and then leading his side to maintain their own place in the third-highest Italian division.

Menichini then moved to Albania as head coach of KF Tirana in 2005–06; however, he was sacked in November 2005 due to disagreements with the board, leaving the club in second place. He then returned to work alongside Mazzone from February to June 2006, during the latter's unsuccessful spell as Livorno head coach.

In April 2008, Menichini was appointed as the new head coach of Serie C2 promotion hopefuls Lumezzane, replacing Mario Petrone, who was sacked following a string of four consecutive defeats. Under his tenure, Lumezzane qualified to the promotion playoffs and ultimately won them, thus ensuring a place in the Lega Pro Prima Divisione 2008–09. He was subsequently confirmed at the helm of the club for the upcoming season.

In June 2010, he was appointed head coach of Calabrian side Crotone for the club's 2010–11 Serie B season. He was dismissed on 27 November 2010 after a 2–1 home loss to Vicenza, leaving Crotone in 11th place after 17 games. He was reinstated as Crotone head coach on 20 February 2011, following a string of negative results that led to the dismissal of Eugenio Corini. On 23 January 2012, he was finally sacked.

From 18 December 2012 to 10 February 2013, he then served as head coach of Grosseto in Serie B. In March 2014, he then served as the new manager of Lega Pro Prima Divisione club Pisa until the end of the season.

On 18 August 2014, he was named new head coach of Lega Pro club Salernitana.

On 30 September 2017, he was fired as the head coach of Serie C club Reggiana.

On 9 May 2019, he was appointed manager of Salernitana, completing the season by winning the relegation playoffs against Venezia.

He successively became the Primavera Under-19 youth coach of Lazio, in charge until 2021.

On 10 November 2021, he returned to management as the new head coach of Serie C club Monterosi, replacing David D'Antoni. He left the club by the end of the 2022–23 season, after escaping relegation on both occasions.

On 23 January 2024, Menichini returned to management as the new head coach of Serie C club Turris. After departing from Turris by the end of the season, on 7 October 2024 Menichini returned to his native Tuscany, taking over at fellow Serie C club Pontedera. He left the club on 2 December 2025, after a negative start of the 2025–26 Serie C season, following a change of ownership in the club.
