= 2014–15 Serie B =

Italian football league season

Serie B
- Season: 2014–15
- Champions: Carpi (1st title)
- Promoted: Carpi; Frosinone; Bologna (by play-off)
- Relegated: Cittadella; Varese (bankruptcy); Catania (match-fixing)
- Matches: 462
- Goals: 1,074 (2.32 per match)

The 2014–15 Serie B was the 83rd season since its establishment in 1929. A total of 22 teams contested the league: 14 of which returning from the 2013–14 season, 5 of which promoted from Prima Divisione, and three relegated from Serie A. The original concept was that due to Siena's exclusion because of financial issues and the fact such vacancy will not be filled in preparation of a future reduction to a league composed by 20 teams, this season featured 21 participant clubs instead of the usual 22. However, on 11 August 2014, Novara won an appeal and the league confirmed a 22nd team. On 29 August, the league chose Vicenza Calcio as the 22nd participant.

The series have 42 weeks of play. The opening games of the season began on 30 August 2014, and the final matches took place on 22 May 2015.

== Teams ==
Relegated from 2013–14 Serie A:

- Catania
- Bologna
- Livorno

From 2013–14 Serie B:

- Latina
- Modena
- Crotone
- Bari
- Spezia
- Lanciano
- Avellino
- Carpi
- Brescia
- Trapani
- Pescara
- Ternana
- Cittadella
- Varese

Promoted from 2013–14 Prima Divisione:

- Virtus Entella
- Perugia
- Pro Vercelli
- Frosinone
- Further: Vicenza, which took the place of Siena.

=== Stadia and locations ===
Location of teams in 2014–15 Serie B

Team	Home city	Stadium	Capacity	2013–14 season
Avellino	Avellino	Partenio	26,000	11th in Serie B
Bari	Bari	San Nicola	58,270	7th in Serie B
Bologna	Bologna	Renato Dall'Ara	38,279	19th in Serie A
Brescia	Brescia	Mario Rigamonti	16,308	13th in Serie B
Carpi	Carpi	Sandro Cabassi	4,144	12th in Serie B
Catania	Catania	Angelo Massimino	20,266	18th in Serie A
Cittadella	Cittadella	Pier Cesare Tombolato	7,623	17th in Serie B
Crotone	Crotone	Ezio Scida	9,631	6th in Serie B
Frosinone	Frosinone	Matusa	9,680	Lega Pro Prima Divisione/B Playoff Winners
Latina	Latina	Domenico Francioni	6,850	3rd in Serie B
Livorno	Livorno	Armando Picchi	19,238	20th in Serie A
Modena	Modena	Alberto Braglia	21,151	5th in Serie B
Perugia	Perugia	Renato Curi	28,000	Lega Pro Prima Divisione/B Champions
Pescara	Pescara	Adriatico	20,476	15th in Serie B
Pro Vercelli	Vercelli	Silvio Piola	8,000	Lega Pro Prima Divisione/A Playoff Winners
Spezia	La Spezia	Alberto Picco	10,000	8th in Serie B
Ternana	Terni	Libero Liberati	22,000	16th in Serie B
Trapani	Trapani (playing in Erice)	Provinciale	7,000	14th in Serie B
Varese	Varese	Franco Ossola	8,213	18th in Serie B
Vicenza	Vicenza	Romeo Menti	17,163	5th in Lega Pro Prima Divisione/A
Virtus Entella	Chiavari	Comunale	4,154	Lega Pro Prima Divisione/A Champions
Virtus Lanciano	Lanciano	Guido Biondi	4,678	10th in Serie B

=== Personnel and kits ===
Team	President	Manager	Kit manufacturer	Shirt sponsor (front)	Shirt sponsor (back)	Shorts sponsor
Avellino	(Italy) Walter Taccone	(Italy) Massimo Rastelli	Givova	Metaedil.com, HS Company	NGM Mobile	CAME Cancelli Automatici
Bari	(Italy) Gianluca Paparesta	(Italy) Davide Nicola	Erreà	SuisseGas	NGM Mobile	CAME Cancelli Automatici
Bologna	(United States) Joe Tacopina	(Italy) Delio Rossi	Macron	NGM Smartphones, +energia	NGM Mobile	CAME Cancelli Automatici
Brescia	(Italy) Luigi Ragazzoni	(Italy) Alessandro Calori	Joma	UBI Banco di Brescia, FALAR serramenti	NGM Mobile	CAME Cancelli Automatici
Carpi	(Italy) Stefano Bonacini	(Italy) Fabrizio Castori	Sportika	Blumarine, Blusport/CAVA International	NGM Mobile	CAME Cancelli Automatici
Catania	(Italy) Antonino Pulvirenti	(Italy) Dario Marcolin	Givova	Fortè Hard Discount, TTT Lines	NGM Mobile	CAME Cancelli Automatici
Cittadella	(Italy) Andrea Gabrielli	(Italy) Claudio Foscarini	Garman	Gruppo Gabrielli (H)/Gavinox (A), Metalservice	NGM Mobile	CAME Cancelli Automatici
Crotone	(Italy) Raffaele Vrenna	(Italy) Massimo Drago	Zeus	V&V Group	NGM Mobile	CAME Cancelli Automatici
Frosinone	(Italy) Maurizio Stirpe	(Italy) Roberto Stellone	Legea	Banca Popolare del Frusinate, GALA	NGM Mobile	CAME Cancelli Automatici
Latina	(Italy) Pasquale Maietta	(Italy) Mark Iuliano	Givova	Bricofer, Recoma Group	NGM Mobile	CAME Cancelli Automatici
Livorno	(Italy) Aldo Spinelli	(Italy) Christian Panucci	Legea	F.O.P. Italia	NGM Mobile	CAME Cancelli Automatici
Modena	(Italy) Angelo Forcina	(Italy) Mauro Melotti & (Italy) Simone Pavan	Erreà	CoopGas, CPL Concordia	NGM Mobile	CAME Cancelli Automatici
Perugia	(Italy) Massimiliano Santopadre	(Italy) Andrea Camplone	Frankie Garage	Officine Piccini, Magna Testone	NGM Mobile	CAME Cancelli Automatici
Pescara	(Italy) Daniele Sebastiani	(Italy) Marco Baroni	Erreà	Officina Metalmeccanica Angelucci, Pharmapiù	NGM Mobile	CAME Cancelli Automatici
Pro Vercelli	(Italy) Massimo Secondo	(Italy) Cristiano Scazzola	Erreà	SeniorService/Punto Service, Riso di Pasta	NGM Mobile	CAME Cancelli Automatici
Spezia	(Italy) Matteo Volpi	(Croatia) Nenad Bjelica	Lotto	Carispezia	NGM Mobile	CAME Cancelli Automatici
Ternana	(Italy) Edoardo Longarini	(Italy) Attilio Tesser	Macron	Banca Mediolanum, Tascout	NGM Mobile	CAME Cancelli Automatici
Trapani	(Italy) Vittorio Morace	(Italy) Serse Cosmi	Macron	Ustica Lines	NGM Mobile	CAME Cancelli Automatici
Varese	(Italy) Nicola Laurenza	(Italy) Stefano Bettinelli	Zeus	Oro in Euro, Unendo Energia Italiana	NGM Mobile	CAME Cancelli Automatici
Vicenza	(Italy) Tiziano Cunico	(Italy) Pasquale Marino	Macron	Banca Popolare di Vicenza	NGM Mobile	CAME Cancelli Automatici
Virtus Entella	(Italy) Antonio Gozzi	(Italy) Alfredo Aglietti	Acerbis	Creditis, Arinox	NGM Mobile	CAME Cancelli Automatici
Virtus Lanciano	(Italy) Valentina Maio	(Italy) Roberto D'Aversa	Legea	Gruppo Maio, Marfisi Carni	NGM Mobile	CAME Cancelli Automatici

=== Managerial changes ===
Team	Outgoing manager	Manner of departure	Date of vacancy	Position in table	Replaced by	Date of appointment
Bologna	(Italy) Davide Ballardini	End of contract	30 June 2014	Pre-season	(Uruguay) Diego López	1 July 2014
Carpi	(Italy) Giuseppe Pillon	End of contract	30 June 2014	Pre-season	(Italy) Fabrizio Castori	1 July 2014
Virtus Lanciano	(Italy) Marco Baroni	Mutual consent	30 June 2014	Pre-season	(Italy) Roberto D'Aversa	20 July 2014
Bari	(Italy) Roberto Alberti	End of contract	30 June 2014	Pre-season	(Italy) Devis Mangia	8 July 2014
Pescara	(Italy) Serse Cosmi	End of contract	30 June 2014	Pre-season	(Italy) Marco Baroni	1 July 2014
Latina	(Italy) Roberto Breda	End of contract	30 June 2014	Pre-season	(Italy) Mario Beretta	1 July 2014
Livorno	(Italy) Davide Nicola	Mutual consent	30 June 2014	Pre-season	(Italy) Carmine Gautieri	4 July 2014
Spezia	(Italy) Devis Mangia	Sacked	30 June 2014	Pre-season	(Croatia) Nenad Bjelica	1 July 2014
Catania	(Italy) Maurizio Pellegrino	Sacked	14 September 2014	20th	(Italy) Giuseppe Sannino	14 September 2014
Latina	(Italy) Mario Beretta	Mutual consent	6 October 2014	14th	(Italy) Roberto Breda	6 October 2014
Vicenza	(Italy) Giovanni Lopez	Sacked	29 October 2014	20th	(Italy) Pasquale Marino	30 October 2014
Bari	(Italy) Devis Mangia	Sacked	16 November 2014	14th	(Italy) Davide Nicola	17 November 2014
Brescia	(Italy) Ivo Iaconi	Sacked	15 December 2014	18th	(Croatia) Ivan Javorčić (caretaker)	15 December 2014
Catania	(Italy) Giuseppe Sannino	Resigned	19 December 2014	17th	(Italy) Maurizio Pellegrino	19 December 2014
Catania	(Italy) Maurizio Pellegrino	Sacked	3 January 2015	19th	(Italy) Dario Marcolin	3 January 2015
Livorno	(Italy) Carmine Gautieri	Mutual consent	4 January 2015	6th	(Italy) Ezio Gelain	4 January 2015
Latina	(Italy) Roberto Breda	Sacked	5 January 2015	21st	(Italy) Mark Iuliano	5 January 2015
Brescia	(Croatia) Ivan Javorčić	End of caretaker spell	21 January 2015	15th	(Italy) Salvatore Giunta	21 January 2015
Brescia	(Italy) Salvatore Giunta	Sacked	18 February 2015	17th	(Italy) Alessandro Calori	18 February 2015
Modena	(Italy) Walter Novellino	Mutual consent	28 February 2015	18th	(Italy) Mauro Melotti and (Italy) Simone Pavan	1 March 2015
Varese	(Italy) Stefano Bettinelli	Sacked	28 February 2015	21st	(Italy) Davide Dionigi	1 March 2015
Varese	(Italy) Davide Dionigi	Sacked	9 March 2015	22nd	(Italy) Stefano Bettinelli	9 March 2015
Trapani	(Italy) Roberto Boscaglia	Sacked	10 March 2015	18th	(Italy) Serse Cosmi	11 March 2015
Livorno	(Italy) Ezio Gelain	Sacked	18 March 2015	6th	(Italy) Christian Panucci	18 March 2015
Virtus Entella	(Italy) Luca Prina	Sacked	12 April 2015	19th	(Italy) Alfredo Aglietti	12 April 2015
Bologna	(Uruguay) Diego López	Sacked	4 May 2015	3rd	(Italy) Delio Rossi	4 May 2015
Pescara	(Italy) Marco Baroni	Sacked	16 May 2015	9th	(Italy) Massimo Oddo	16 May 2015

=== Ownership changes ===
Team	Previous owner	New owner	Date
Bologna	(Italy)	(United States) Joe Tacopina and (Canada) Joseph Christopher Vita	15 October 2014
Brescia	(Italy) Gino Corioni	(Italy) Profida Italia	26 February 2015

== League table ==
Pos	Team	Pld	W	D	L	GF	GA	GD	Pts	Promotion, qualification or relegation
1	Carpi (C, P)	42	22	14	6	59	28	+31	80	Promotion to Serie A
2	Frosinone (P)	42	20	11	11	62	49	+13	71	Promotion to Serie A
3	Vicenza	42	18	14	10	44	37	+7	68	Qualification to promotion play-offs semi-finals
4	Bologna (O, P)	42	17	17	8	49	35	+14	68	Qualification to promotion play-offs semi-finals
5	Spezia	42	18	13	11	59	40	+19	67	Qualification to promotion play-offs preliminary round
6	Perugia	42	16	18	8	49	40	+9	66	Qualification to promotion play-offs preliminary round
7	Pescara	42	16	13	13	69	55	+14	61	Qualification to promotion play-offs preliminary round
8	Avellino	42	15	14	13	42	42	0	59	Qualification to promotion play-offs preliminary round
9	Livorno	42	15	14	13	57	50	+7	59	
10	Bari	42	14	12	16	43	49	−6	54	
11	Trapani	42	13	14	15	56	67	−11	53	
12	Ternana	42	13	12	17	36	47	−11	51	
13	Latina	42	11	17	14	38	41	−3	50	
14	Virtus Lanciano	42	10	20	12	49	48	+1	50	
15	Pro Vercelli	42	12	13	17	46	57	−11	49	
16	Crotone	42	12	12	18	42	52	−10	48	
17	Modena	42	10	17	15	37	39	−2	47	Qualification to relegation play-offs
18	Virtus Entella (Note: Virtus Entella was readmitted to Serie B after Catania's relegation.)	42	10	17	15	37	52	−15	47	Qualification to relegation play-offs
19	Cittadella (R)	42	9	17	16	47	56	−9	44	Relegation to Lega Pro
20	Brescia (Note: Brescia was docked 6 points. They were also readmitted to Serie B after the bankruptcy of Parma in Serie A.) (T)	42	12	12	18	54	63	−9	42	Spared from relegation
21	Varese (Note: Varese was docked 4 points for financial irregularities; a phoenix club was admitted to Eccellenza due to Varese's exclusion from Lega Pro.) (D, R, E, R)	42	9	12	21	40	67	−27	35	Revival in Eccellenza
22	Catania (Note: Catania was assigned as the last due to match-fixing scandal on 20 August 2015.) (D, R)	42	12	13	17	59	60	−1	49	Relegation to Lega Pro

Source: Lega Serie B
(C) Champions; (D) Disqualified; (E) Eliminated; (O) Play-off winners; (P) Promoted; (R) Relegated; (T) Qualified, but not yet for the particular phase indicated

== Playoffs ==
=== Promotion play-offs ===
Because 3rd place team finished less than 10 points ahead of 4th and five teams from 4-8 finished within 14 points of third, six teams will play in the promotion playoffs. A preliminary one-legged round, played at the home venue of the higher placed team, involved the teams from 5th to 8th place. The two winning teams will then play against the 3rd and 4th-placed teams in two-legged semifinals. The higher placed team plays the second leg of the promotion playoff at home. If scores are tied after both games in the semifinals, the higher placed team progresses to the final. The same conditions apply to the final.

Preliminary round
6	Perugia	1
7	Pescara	2
5	Spezia	1
8	Avellino	2

Semifinals
7	Pescara	1	2	3
3	Vicenza	0	2	2
8	Avellino	0	3	3
4	Bologna	1	2	3

Two-legged final
7	Pescara	0	1	1
4	Bologna	0	1	1

=== Relegation play-out ===
In case of an aggregate tie, the higher placed team wins.

Team 1	Agg.	Team 2	1st leg	2nd leg
Virtus Entella(19)	3–3	Modena(18)	2–2	1–1

The matches later became null and void following Catania’s disqualification.

== Results ==
Home \ Away	AVE	BAR	BOL	BRE	CRP	CTN	CIT	CRO	FRO	LAT	LIV	MOD	PER	PES	PVE	SPE	TER	TRA	VAR	VIC	VET	VLN
Avellino		2–0	1–0	2–0	1–0	1–0	1–2	1–2	3–0	1–0	2–1	1–0	1–2	3–2	1–0	0–0	1–1	1–1	0–0	0–1	1–1	1–1
Bari	4–2		1–1	3–2	0–0	1–1	1–0	1–1	4–0	1–0	2–0	1–1	0–2	1–1	1–0	0–3	0–1	2–1	3–0	0–1	0–0	2–0
Bologna	1–1	2–0		1–2	0–0	2–0	1–0	0–2	2–2	0–0	2–0	0–0	2–1	0–0	3–0	0–0	0–0	2–1	3–0	0–2	1–1	1–0
Brescia	3–2	2–1	1–1		3–3	4–2	0–0	2–1	3–1	1–2	0–1	0–1	1–2	1–3	2–1	0–1	0–0	1–1	1–1	3–0	3–0	1–1
Carpi	2–0	0–0	3–0	3–0		0–0	5–2	2–1	0–0	2–1	1–2	1–0	4–0	1–2	1–0	0–0	3–1	2–2	4–2	1–0	0–0	0–0
Catania	1–0	2–3	2–2	2–2	0–2		2–3	1–1	1–2	1–0	1–1	0–0	2–0	2–1	4–0	2–2	2–0	4–1	2–1	3–1	5–1	3–3
Cittadella	3–1	0–1	0–1	1–1	0–1	3–2		0–0	1–1	1–1	1–1	1–1	0–2	3–2	1–2	1–3	0–0	1–0	3–0	0–1	0–1	2–3
Crotone	2–0	3–0	0–2	1–0	1–1	1–1	2–2		2–0	2–1	1–0	1–4	2–1	1–4	0–1	2–0	0–2	1–0	1–0	0–0	0–0	1–1
Frosinone	0–0	1–1	2–1	1–0	1–0	1–0	1–1	3–1		1–0	5–1	2–0	2–1	2–1	3–2	1–1	0–1	4–1	1–1	1–0	3–3	2–1
Latina	1–2	2–0	1–2	1–1	0–1	1–2	3–2	1–0	1–4		3–2	1–1	0–0	2–0	1–1	1–2	1–1	1–0	1–0	0–0	1–1	1–0
Livorno	0–1	5–2	3–2	4–2	1–1	4–2	0–1	1–0	0–0	1–1		1–1	0–0	1–2	3–1	0–1	3–1	6–0	1–0	1–1	2–1	1–0
Modena	1–2	0–1	0–0	1–1	1–2	0–0	1–1	3–0	1–0	0–0	0–0		0–0	2–0	1–0	2–0	1–2	2–1	1–1	1–2	2–0	1–1
Perugia	0–0	1–1	2–1	1–0	2–0	1–0	3–1	0–0	0–1	0–0	1–1	2–0		2–2	3–2	2–1	2–2	1–0	2–0	2–2	2–1	0–0
Pescara	0–0	0–0	2–3	2–3	0–5	1–0	1–1	2–1	3–0	1–1	3–0	1–0	2–2		1–0	1–2	1–2	0–0	2–0	2–2	4–0	1–1
Pro Vercelli	1–1	3–0	1–1	0–0	0–0	3–2	0–1	3–2	1–1	1–1	3–3	1–1	0–0	0–4		1–0	2–1	1–0	4–0	1–1	2–0	2–1
Spezia	0–1	1–0	1–1	4–1	1–2	3–0	0–0	2–0	2–1	1–1	3–0	3–2	2–0	2–2	5–2		0–1	3–0	1–1	0–0	1–0	3–3
Ternana	2–2	2–0	0–1	2–1	0–1	1–0	1–1	2–1	0–1	0–2	0–4	1–0	0–0	1–1	0–1	0–0		1–2	2–0	0–2	0–1	0–1
Trapani	4–1	1–1	0–0	3–2	0–0	2–2	2–1	3–1	3–1	1–0	0–0	3–0	2–2	2–4	2–1	3–2	4–2		0–0	2–1	2–2	1–0
Varese	1–1	2–1	1–3	1–2	0–1	0–3	2–2	1–0	1–4	1–2	0–1	2–1	1–1	2–1	1–1	2–1	2–0	5–2		2–3	2–2	1–1
Vicenza	1–0	1–0	0–0	2–0	1–2	0–0	1–1	1–0	2–1	0–0	0–0	0–2	3–1	2–1	2–1	1–0	2–0	3–0	1–0		0–0	2–2
Virtus Entella	0–0	0–2	1–2	0–1	2–0	2–0	2–1	1–1	1–0	2–0	1–1	1–1	0–2	2–5	0–0	2–0	2–1	1–1	0–1	2–1		0–0
Virtus Lanciano	1–0	1–1	1–2	2–0	1–1	3–0	2–2	1–1	1–5	1–1	1–0	2–0	1–1	0–1	2–0	0–2	1–1	2–2	1–2	4–0	1–0	

Updated to match(es) played on 22 May 2015. Source: Lega Serie B
Legend: Blue = home team win; Yellow = draw; Red = away team win.

== Statistics ==
=== Top goalscorers ===
Updated including all games played up until May 22, 2015

Rank	Player	Club	Goals
1	(Italy) Andrea Cocco	Vicenza	19
1	(Italy) Andrea Catellani	Spezia	19
1	(Uruguay) Pablo Granoche	Modena	19
4	(Italy) Riccardo Maniero	Pescara / Catania	18
4	(Italy) Emanuele Calaiò	Catania	18
6	(Italy) Ettore Marchi	Pro Vercelli	17
6	(Italy) Camillo Ciano	Crotone	17
8	(Italy) Luigi Castaldo	Avellino	16
9	(Nigeria) Jerry Mbakogu	Carpi	15
9	(Italy) Daniele Vantaggiato	Livorno	15

Source: Official Goalscorers' Standings

== Attendances ==
#	Club	Average
1	Bari	19,272
2	Bologna	15,177
3	Catania	13,476
4	Perugia	10,837
5	Vicenza	7,868
6	Avellino	7,167
7	Pescara	7,006
8	Livorno	6,335
9	Spezia	6,299
10	Brescia	5,946
11	Modena	5,634
12	Frosinone	5,246
13	Trapani	5,038
14	Ternana	4,923
15	Crotone	4,527
16	Latina	3,810
17	Virtus Lanciano	3,024
18	Carpi	3,020
19	Pro Vercelli	2,988
20	Varese	2,977
21	Cittadella	2,643
22	Virtus Entella	2,176
