= 2013–14 Serie A =

112th season of top-tier Italian football

Serie A
- Season: 2013–14
- Dates: 24 August 2013 – 18 May 2014
- Champions: Juventus; 30th title
- Relegated: Livorno; Bologna; Catania
- Champions League: Milan; Juventus; Napoli
- Europa League: Fiorentina; Internazionale; Torino
- Matches: 380
- Goals: 1,035 (2.72 per match)
- Top goalscorer: Ciro Immobile (22 goals)
- Biggest home win: Roma 5–0 Bologna (29 September 2013); Sampdoria 5–0 Hellas Verona (23 March 2014)
- Biggest away win: Sassuolo 0–7 Internazionale (22 September 2013)
- Highest scoring: 8 goals: Hellas Verona 3–5 Fiorentina (13 April 2014); Udinese 5–3 Livorno (4 May 2014)
- Longest winning run: 12 games Milan
- Longest unbeaten run: 22 games Milan
- Longest winless run: 10 games Livorno
- Longest losing run: 7 games Livorno
- Average attendance: 23,481

The 2013–14 Serie A (known as the Serie A TIM for sponsorship reasons) was the 112th season of top-tier Italian football, the 82nd in a round-robin tournament, and the 4th since its organization under a league committee separate from Serie B. The season began on 24 August 2013 and concluded on 18 May 2014. As in previous years, Nike provided the official ball for all matches with a new Nike Incyte model used throughout the season. Juventus were the defending champions, and successfully defended their title to win a third Serie A title in a row with a record-breaking 102 points. Juventus's title was also their 30th league title in their history earning them the right to add a third gold star to their crest.

A total of 20 teams competed in the league: 17 sides from the 2012–13 season and three promoted from the 2012–13 Serie B campaign. Palermo, Pescara and Siena were each demoted from the top flight. They were replaced by Serie B champion Sassuolo, runner-up Hellas Verona and play-off winner Livorno. Hellas Verona returned to Serie A after an 11-year absence, Livorno after four seasons and this season marked Sassuolo's Serie A debut.

For the first time in the competition's history, there were five derbies among teams from the same city: Milan (Internazionale and Milan), Turin (Juventus and Torino), Rome (Lazio and Roma), Genoa (Genoa and Sampdoria), and Verona (Chievo and Hellas Verona).

== Teams ==
=== Stadiums and locations ===
Locations of the 2013–14 Serie A teams

Team	Home city	Stadium	Capacity	2012–13 season
Atalanta	Bergamo	Atleti Azzurri d'Italia	26,542	15th in Serie A
Bologna	Bologna	Renato Dall'Ara	38,279	13th in Serie A
Cagliari	Cagliari	Sant'Elia (Note: Cagliari is going to play at Stadio Nereo Rocco in Trieste while Stadio Sant'Elia is under renovation.)	5,000	11th in Serie A
Catania	Catania	Angelo Massimino	23,420	8th in Serie A
Chievo	Verona	Marc'Antonio Bentegodi	38,402	12th in Serie A
Fiorentina	Florence	Artemio Franchi	47,282	4th in Serie A
Genoa	Genoa	Luigi Ferraris	36,685	17th in Serie A
Internazionale	Milan	San Siro	80,018	9th in Serie A
Juventus	Turin	Juventus Stadium	41,254	Serie A champions
Lazio	Rome	Olimpico	72,698	7th in Serie A
Livorno	Livorno	Armando Picchi	19,238	Serie B playoffs winner
Milan	Milan	San Siro	80,018	3rd in Serie A
Napoli	Naples	San Paolo	60,240	2nd in Serie A
Parma	Parma	Ennio Tardini	27,906	10th in Serie A
Roma	Rome	Olimpico	72,698	6th in Serie A
Sampdoria	Genoa	Luigi Ferraris	36,685	14th in Serie A
Sassuolo	Sassuolo (playing in Reggio Emilia)	Mapei Stadium	20,084	Serie B Champions
Torino	Turin	Olimpico di Torino	27,994	16th in Serie A
Udinese	Udine	Friuli (Note: Some matches may be played at Stadio Nereo Rocco in Trieste if Stadio Friuli's renovation is not finished.)	30,642	5th in Serie A
Hellas Verona	Verona	Marc'Antonio Bentegodi	38,402	2nd in Serie B

=== Personnel and sponsorship ===
Team	Head coach	Captain	Kit manufacturer	Front shirt sponsor(s)	
Team	Head coach	Captain	Kit manufacturer	Main	Secondary
Atalanta	(Italy) Stefano Colantuono	(Italy) Gianpaolo Bellini	Erreà	AXA	Konica Minolta
Bologna	(Italy) Davide Ballardini	(Uruguay) Diego Pérez	Macron	NGM Mobile	None
Cagliari	(Italy) Ivo Pulga	(Italy) Daniele Conti	Kappa	Sardegna	Tirrenia
Catania	(Italy) Maurizio Pellegrino	(Argentina) Mariano Izco	Givova	Fiorucci Salumi	TTT Lines
Chievo	(Italy) Eugenio Corini	(Italy) Sergio Pellissier	Givova	Paluani/Midac Batteries/Banca Popolare di Verona	Midac Batteries/Magneti Marelli
Fiorentina	(Italy) Vincenzo Montella	(Italy) Manuel Pasqual	Joma	Mazda	None
Genoa	(Italy) Gian Piero Gasperini	(Italy) Daniele Portanova	Lotto	iZiPlay	None
Internazionale	(Italy) Walter Mazzarri	(Argentina) Javier Zanetti	Nike	Pirelli	None
Juventus	(Italy) Antonio Conte	(Italy) Gianluigi Buffon	Nike	Jeep	None
Lazio	(Italy) Edoardo Reja	(Italy) Stefano Mauri	Macron	Lazio Style Channel/Clinica Paideia	None
Livorno	(Italy) Davide Nicola	(Italy) Andrea Luci	Legea	Banca Carige	None
Milan	(Netherlands) Clarence Seedorf	(Italy) Riccardo Montolivo	Adidas	Fly Emirates	None
Napoli	(Spain) Rafael Benítez	(Slovakia) Marek Hamšík	Macron	Lete	MSC Cruises
Parma	(Italy) Roberto Donadoni	(Italy) Alessandro Lucarelli	Erreà	Folletto	Navigare
Roma	(France) Rudi Garcia	(Italy) Francesco Totti	In-house	Roma Cares/Sky Sport HD/Telethon	None
Sampdoria	(Serbia) Siniša Mihajlović	(Italy) Daniele Gastaldello	Kappa	Gamenet	None
Sassuolo	(Italy) Eusebio Di Francesco	(Italy) Francesco Magnanelli	Sportika	Mapei	None
Torino	(Italy) Giampiero Ventura	(Poland) Kamil Glik	Kappa	Fratelli Beretta	Suzuki/Suzuki S-Cross
Udinese	(Italy) Francesco Guidolin	(Italy) Antonio Di Natale	HS Football	Dacia	UPIM
Hellas Verona	(Italy) Andrea Mandorlini	(Italy) Domenico Maietta	Nike	Manila Grace/Franklin & Marshall	Leaderform/agsm

=== Managerial changes ===
Team	Outgoing manager	Manner of departure	Date of vacancy	Position in table	Replaced by	Date of appointment
Napoli	(Italy) Walter Mazzarri	Resigned	19 May 2013	Pre-season	(Spain) Rafael Benítez	27 May 2013
Internazionale	(Italy) Andrea Stramaccioni	Sacked	24 May 2013	Pre-season	(Italy) Walter Mazzarri	24 May 2013
Chievo	(Italy) Eugenio Corini	Mutual consent		Pre-season	(Italy) Giuseppe Sannino	1 July 2013
Genoa	(Italy) Davide Ballardini	Mutual consent		Pre-season	(Italy) Fabio Liverani	7 June 2013
Cagliari	(Italy) Ivo Pulga	Demoted to assistant coach		Pre-season	(Uruguay) Diego López	16 July 2013 (Note: Assistant coach Diego López was promoted to head coaching role after he was admitted to the yearly UEFA Pro Licence course on 16 July 2013, with former head coach Ivo Pulga being moved to an assistant role, thus exchanging roles with respect to the previous season.)
Roma	(Italy) Aurelio Andreazzoli	End of caretaker spell	12 June 2013	Pre-season	(France) Rudi Garcia	12 June 2013
Genoa	(Italy) Fabio Liverani	Sacked	29 September 2013	15th	(Italy) Gian Piero Gasperini	29 September 2013
Catania	(Italy) Rolando Maran	Sacked	20 October 2013	17th	(Italy) Luigi De Canio	20 October 2013
Sampdoria	(Italy) Delio Rossi	Sacked	11 November 2013	18th	(Serbia) Siniša Mihajlović	20 November 2013
Chievo	(Italy) Giuseppe Sannino	Sacked	11 November 2013	20th	(Italy) Eugenio Corini	11 November 2013
Lazio	(Bosnia and Herzegovina) Vladimir Petković	Sacked	4 January 2014	10th	(Italy) Edoardo Reja	4 January 2014
Bologna	(Italy) Stefano Pioli	Sacked	7 January 2014	17th	(Italy) Davide Ballardini	8 January 2014
Milan	(Italy) Massimiliano Allegri	Sacked	13 January 2014	11th	(Netherlands) Clarence Seedorf	16 January 2014
Livorno	(Italy) Davide Nicola	Sacked	13 January 2014	19th	(Italy) Attilio Perotti	13 January 2014
Catania	(Italy) Luigi De Canio	Sacked	16 January 2014	20th	(Italy) Rolando Maran	16 January 2014
Livorno	(Italy) Attilio Perotti	End of caretaker spell	21 January 2014	19th	(Italy) Domenico Di Carlo	21 January 2014
Sassuolo	(Italy) Eusebio Di Francesco	Sacked	28 January 2014	18th	(Italy) Alberto Malesani	29 January 2014
Sassuolo	(Italy) Alberto Malesani	Sacked	3 March 2014	20th	(Italy) Eusebio Di Francesco	3 March 2014
Cagliari	(Uruguay) Diego López	Sacked	7 April 2014	15th	(Italy) Ivo Pulga	7 April 2014
Catania	(Italy) Rolando Maran	Sacked	7 April 2014	20th	(Italy) Maurizio Pellegrino	7 April 2014
Livorno	(Italy) Domenico Di Carlo	Sacked	21 April 2014	19th	(Italy) Davide Nicola	21 April 2014

== League table ==
Pos	Team	Pld	W	D	L	GF	GA	GD	Pts	Qualification or relegation
1	Juventus (C)	38	33	3	2	80	23	+57	102	Qualification for the Champions League group stage
2	Roma	38	26	7	5	72	25	+47	85	Qualification for the Champions League group stage
3	Napoli	38	23	9	6	77	39	+38	78	Qualification for the Champions League play-off round
4	Fiorentina	38	19	8	11	65	44	+21	65	Qualification for the Europa League group stage (Note: Since the 2013–14 Coppa Italia champions Napoli and runners–up Fiorentina qualified for the 2014–15 European football season thus 4th, 5th and 6th in Serie A (barring any failure to receive a "UEFA licence" from the FIGC or a ban from European competition) would qualify for group stage, play-off round and third qualifying round respectively.)
5	Internazionale	38	15	15	8	62	39	+23	60	Qualification for the Europa League play-off round
6	Parma	38	15	13	10	58	46	+12	58	
7	Torino	38	15	12	11	58	48	+10	57 (Note: Torino finished ahead of Milan on goal difference : Torino 2-2 Milan, Milan 1-1 Torino; Torino = +10, Milan = +8.)	Qualification for the Europa League third qualifying round (Note: The FIGC rejected the application of Parma for a UEFA licence, because Parma had overdue tax debt; their place went to seventh-place Torino, which had a UEFA licence.)
8	Milan	38	16	9	13	57	49	+8	57	
9	Lazio	38	15	11	12	54	54	0	56	
10	Hellas Verona	38	16	6	16	62	68	−6	54	
11	Atalanta	38	15	5	18	43	51	−8	50	
12	Sampdoria	38	12	9	17	48	62	−14	45	
13	Udinese	38	12	8	18	46	57	−11	44 (Note: Udinese finished ahead of Genoa on head-to-head away goals scored: Udinese 1-0 Genoa, Udinese 3-3 Genoa.)	
14	Genoa	38	11	11	16	41	50	−9	44	
15	Cagliari	38	9	12	17	34	53	−19	39	
16	Chievo	38	10	6	22	34	54	−20	36	
17	Sassuolo	38	9	7	22	43	72	−29	34	
18	Catania (R)	38	8	8	22	34	66	−32	32	Relegation to Serie B
19	Bologna (R)	38	5	14	19	28	58	−30	29	Relegation to Serie B
20	Livorno (R)	38	6	7	25	39	77	−38	25	Relegation to Serie B

Source: Serie A, Soccerway
Rules for classification: 1st points; 2nd head-to-head points; 3rd head-to-head goal difference; 4th goal difference; 5th number of goals scored; 6th public draw.
(Head-to-head record is applied for clubs with the same number of points only once all matches between said clubs have been played)
(C) Champions; (R) Relegated

== Results ==
Home \ Away	ATA	BOL	CAG	CTN	CHV	FIO	GEN	HEL	INT	JUV	LAZ	LIV	MIL	NAP	PAR	ROM	SAM	SAS	TOR	UDI
Atalanta		2–1	1–0	2–1	2–1	0–2	1–1	1–2	1–1	1–4	2–1	2–0	2–1	3–0	0–4	1–1	3–0	0–2	2–0	2–0
Bologna	0–2		1–0	1–2	0–0	0–3	1–0	1–4	1–1	0–2	0–0	1–0	3–3	2–2	1–1	0–1	2–2	0–0	1–2	0–2
Cagliari	2–1	0–3		2–1	0–1	1–0	2–1	1–0	1–1	1–4	0–2	1–2	1–2	1–1	1–0	1–3	2–2	2–2	2–1	3–0
Catania	2–1	2–0	1–1		2–0	0–3	1–1	0–0	0–3	0–1	3–1	3–3	1–3	2–4	0–0	4–1	2–1	0–0	1–2	1–0
Chievo	0–1	3–0	0–0	2–0		1–2	2–1	0–1	2–1	1–2	0–2	3–0	0–0	2–4	1–2	0–2	0–1	0–1	0–1	2–1
Fiorentina	2–0	3–0	1–1	2–1	3–1		3–3	4–3	1–2	4–2	0–1	1–0	0–2	1–2	2–2	0–1	2–1	3–4	2–2	2–1
Genoa	1–1	0–0	1–2	2–0	2–1	2–5		2–0	1–0	0–1	2–0	0–0	1–2	0–2	1–0	1–0	0–1	2–0	1–1	3–3
Hellas Verona	2–1	0–0	2–1	4–0	0–1	3–5	3–0		0–2	2–2	4–1	2–1	2–1	0–3	3–2	1–3	2–0	2–0	1–3	2–2
Internazionale	1–2	2–2	1–1	0–0	1–1	2–1	2–0	4–2		1–1	4–1	2–0	1–0	0–0	3–3	0–3	1–1	1–0	1–0	0–0
Juventus	1–0	1–0	3–0	4–0	3–1	1–0	2–0	2–1	3–1		4–1	2–0	3–2	3–0	2–1	3–0	4–2	4–0	1–0	1–0
Lazio	0–1	1–0	2–0	3–1	3–0	0–0	0–2	3–3	1–0	1–1		2–0	1–1	2–4	3–2	0–0	2–0	3–2	3–3	2–1
Livorno	1–0	2–1	1–1	2–0	2–4	0–1	0–1	2–3	2–2	0–2	0–2		2–2	1–1	0–3	0–2	1–2	3–1	3–3	1–2
Milan	3–0	1–0	3–1	1–0	3–0	0–2	1–1	1–0	1–0	0–2	1–1	3–0		1–2	2–4	2–2	1–0	2–1	1–1	1–0
Napoli	2–0	3–0	3–0	2–1	1–1	0–1	1–1	5–1	4–2	2–0	4–2	4–0	3–1		0–1	1–0	2–0	1–1	2–0	3–3
Parma	4–3	1–1	0–0	0–0	0–0	2–2	1–1	2–0	0–2	0–1	1–1	2–0	3–2	1–0		1–3	2–0	3–1	3–1	1–0
Roma	3–1	5–0	0–0	4–0	1–0	2–1	4–0	3–0	0–0	0–1	2–0	3–0	2–0	2–0	4–2		3–0	1–1	2–1	3–2
Sampdoria	1–0	1–1	1–0	2–0	2–1	0–0	0–3	5–0	0–4	0–1	1–1	4–2	0–2	2–5	1–1	0–2		3–4	2–2	3–0
Sassuolo	2–0	2–1	1–1	3–1	0–1	0–1	4–2	1–2	0–7	1–3	2–2	1–4	4–3	0–2	0–1	0–2	1–2		0–2	1–2
Torino	1–0	1–2	2–1	4–1	4–1	0–0	2–1	2–2	3–3	0–1	1–0	3–1	2–2	0–1	1–1	1–1	0–2	2–0		2–0
Udinese	1–1	1–1	2–0	1–0	3–0	1–0	1–0	1–3	0–3	0–2	2–3	5–3	1–0	1–1	3–1	0–1	3–3	1–0	0–2	

Updated to match(es) played on 18 May 2014. Source: Lega Serie A
Legend: Blue = home team win; Yellow = draw; Red = away team win.

== Season statistics ==
=== Top goalscorers ===
Rank	Player	Club	Goals
1	(Italy) Ciro Immobile	Torino	22
2	(Italy) Luca Toni	Hellas Verona	20
3	(Argentina) Carlos Tevez	Juventus	19
4	(Italy) Antonio Di Natale	Udinese	17
4	(Argentina) Gonzalo Higuaín	Napoli	17
4	(Argentina) Rodrigo Palacio	Internazionale	17
7	(Italy) Domenico Berardi	Sassuolo	16
7	(Spain) Fernando Llorente	Juventus	16
7	(Italy) Giuseppe Rossi	Fiorentina	16
10	(Spain) José Callejón	Napoli	15
10	(Italy) Alberto Gilardino	Genoa	15
10	(Brazil) Paulinho	Livorno	15

=== Scoring ===
- First goal of the season: Poli (Milan) in Hellas Verona–Milan 2–1, 15 minutes (24 August 2013)
- Fastest goal of the season: Sansone (Sampdoria) in Sassuolo–Sampdoria 1–2, 18 seconds (26 March 2014)

=== Discipline ===
- First yellow card of the season: Jorginho (Hellas Verona) in Hellas Verona–Milan 2–1, 20 minutes (24 August 2013)
- First red card of the season: Castellini (Sampdoria) in Sampdoria–Juventus 0–1, 90 minutes (24 August 2013)

=== Hat-tricks ===
Player	Team	Against	Result	Date
(Italy) Giuseppe Rossi	Fiorentina	Juventus	4–2	20 October 2013
(Italy) Domenico Berardi	Sassuolo	Sampdoria	4–3	3 November 2013
(Argentina) Carlos Tevez	Juventus	Sassuolo	4–0	15 December 2013
(Italy) Domenico Berardi^{4}	Sassuolo	Milan	4–3	12 January 2014
(Italy) Alberto Aquilani	Fiorentina	Genoa	3–3	26 January 2014
(Italy) Ciro Immobile	Torino	Livorno	3–1	22 March 2014
(Italy) Mattia Destro	Roma	Cagliari	3–1	6 April 2014
(Italy) Alberto Paloschi	Chievo	Livorno	4–2	13 April 2014
(Argentina) Gonzalo Higuaín	Napoli	Lazio	4–2	13 April 2014
(Italy) Domenico Berardi	Sassuolo	Fiorentina	4–3	6 May 2014
(Italy) Antonio Di Natale	Udinese	Sampdoria	3–3	17 May 2014

== Awards ==
Gran Galà del Calcio AIC: 2013–14 Individual Awards
Player of the Year (MVP)	(Italy) Andrea Pirlo (Juventus)
Coach of the Year	(Italy) Antonio Conte (Juventus)
Club of the Year	(Italy) Juventus
Goalkeeper of the Year	(Italy) Gianluigi Buffon (Juventus)
Referee of the Year	(Italy) Nicola Rizzoli

AIC Team of the Year: 2013–14 Serie A
Goalkeeper	(Italy) Gianluigi Buffon (Juventus)			
Defenders	(Italy) Matteo Darmian (Torino)	(Italy) Andrea Barzagli (Juventus)	(Morocco) Mehdi Benatia (Roma)	(Ghana) Kwadwo Asamoah (Juventus)
Midfielders	(Chile) Arturo Vidal (Juventus)		(Italy) Andrea Pirlo (Juventus)	(France) Paul Pogba (Juventus)
Forwards	(Argentina) Carlos Tevez (Juventus)		(Argentina) Gonzalo Higuaín (Napoli)	(Italy) Ciro Immobile (Torino)

== Average attendance ==
Team	Average attendance	High	Low
Internazionale	46,246	79,343	32,765
Napoli	40,632	56,225	10,000
Roma	40,436	54,097	28,000
Milan	39,874	75,589	29,631
Juventus	38,328	39,334	32,279
Fiorentina	32,057	40,912	27,767
Lazio	31,905	49,236	24,858
Sampdoria	22,158	34,292	20,076
Hellas Verona	21,172	25,164	17,729
Bologna	21,145	30,929	15,227
Genoa	20,055	29,878	17,875
Torino	17,024	25,559	12,572
Catania	15,197	19,945	12,172
Udinese	14,252	22,262	9,750
Atalanta	14,194	20,140	10,543
Sassuolo	13,753	22,001	9,315
Parma	13,451	17,740	10,409
Livorno	10,982	18,735	8,608
Chievo	9,149	20,000	5,000
Cagliari	4,636	4,798	4,000

Source:http://www.european-football-statistics.co.uk/attn.htm
