= 2013–14 Serie B =

Italian football league season

Serie B
- Season: 2013–14
- Champions: Palermo (4th title)
- Promoted: Palermo; Empoli; Cesena (by Play-off)
- Relegated: Siena (bankruptcy); Novara; Padova (bankruptcy); Reggina; Juve Stabia
- Matches: 462
- Goals: 1,099 (2.38 per match)
- Top goalscorer: 26 goals Matteo Mancosu
- Biggest home win: Ternana 5–0 Novara
- Biggest away win: Padova 0-4 Cittadella
- Highest scoring: Siena 5-2 Crotone; Varese 4-3 Reggina; Trapani 3-4 Bari
- Longest winning run: 6 games Palermo
- Longest unbeaten run: 20 games Palermo
- Longest winless run: 18 games Juve Stabia
- Longest losing run: 7 games Varese
- Highest attendance: 48,744; Bari 4-1 Novara (30 May 2014)
- Lowest attendance: 936; Bari 1-0 Modena (14 September 2013)

The 2013–14 Serie B (known as the Serie B Eurobet for sponsorship reasons) was the 82nd season since its establishment in 1929. A total of 22 teams contested the league: 15 of which were returning from the 2012–13 season, 4 of which were promoted from Lega Pro Prima Divisione, and three relegated from Serie A.

The league features three clubs relegated from Serie A: Pescara returned after a one-year stint, Siena after two seasons, and Palermo after nine seasons.

Four teams were promoted from Lega Pro Prima Divisione, with only two certain as of May 2013: Avellino, after four seasons, and Trapani, which will make their debut in the league. On 16 June, the winners of the Lega Pro Prima Divisione play-off finals were determined as two newcomers: Carpi and Latina.

== Changes from last season ==
=== Playoff format ===
A new playoff format changes the number of playoff participants from four (third through sixth place) to a variable-size playoff including up to six teams (third through eighth place). Qualifying teams must finish the season within a "playoff margin" of 14 points from the third place team. Similar to previous seasons, if the third-place team finishes 10 or more points above the fourth place team, no playoffs will be held.

The following formats will be used for playoffs consisting of two to six teams:

- Two teams, single round: 3 plays 4.
- Three teams, two rounds: 4 plays 5 in semifinal; semifinal winner plays 3.
- Four teams, two rounds: 3 plays 6 and 4 plays 5 in semifinals; semifinal winners play each other.
- Five teams, three rounds: 6 plays 7 in opening round; 3 plays 6/7 and 4 plays 5 in semifinals; semifinal winners play each other.
- Six teams, three rounds: 5 plays 8 and 6 plays 7 in opening round; 3 plays 6/7 and 4 plays 5/8 in semifinals; semifinal winners play each other.

Semifinals and finals are two-legged ties, while opening round matches are single legs hosted by the higher-ranked team.

=== Team changes ===
==== From Serie B ====
Promoted to Serie A

- Sassuolo
- Verona
- Livorno

Relegated to Lega Pro Prima Divisione

- Vicenza
- Ascoli
- Pro Vercelli
- Grosseto

==== To Serie B ====
Relegated from Serie A

- Palermo
- Siena
- Pescara

Promoted from Lega Pro Prima Divisione (Girone A)

- Trapani
- Carpi

Promoted from Lega Pro Prima Divisione (Girone B)

- Avellino
- Latina

== Teams ==
=== Stadia and locations ===
Location of teams in Serie B 2013–14

Team	Home city	Stadium	Capacity	2012–13 season
Avellino	Avellino	Partenio	26,000	Prima Divisione/B Champions
Bari	Bari	San Nicola	58,270	10th in Serie B
Brescia	Brescia	Mario Rigamonti	23,486	6th in Serie B
Carpi	Carpi	Sandro Cabassi	4,144	Prima Divisione/A play-off winners
Cesena	Cesena	Dino Manuzzi	23,860	14th in Serie B
Cittadella	Cittadella	Pier Cesare Tombolato	7,623	15th in Serie B
Crotone	Crotone	Ezio Scida	9,631	12th in Serie B
Empoli	Empoli	Carlo Castellani	19,795	4th in Serie B
Juve Stabia	Castellammare di Stabia	Romeo Menti	7,642	16th in Serie B
Latina	Latina	Domenico Francioni	6,850	Prima Divisione/B play-off winners
Modena	Modena	Alberto Braglia	21,151	8th in Serie B
Novara	Novara	Silvio Piola	17,875	5th in Serie B
Padova	Padova	Euganeo	18,060	11th in Serie B
Palermo	Palermo	Renzo Barbera	36,349	18th in Serie A
Pescara	Pescara	Adriatico	24,400	20th in Serie A
Reggina	Reggio Calabria	Oreste Granillo	27,454	17th in Serie B
Siena	Siena	Artemio Franchi	15,373	19th in Serie A
Spezia	La Spezia	Alberto Picco	10,000	13th in Serie B
Ternana	Terni	Libero Liberati	22,000	9th in Serie B
Trapani	Trapani (playing in Erice)	Provinciale	7,000	Prima Divisione/A Champions
Varese	Varese	Franco Ossola	8,213	7th in Serie B
Virtus Lanciano	Lanciano	Guido Biondi	4,678	18th in Serie B

=== Personnel and kits ===
Team	President	Manager	Kit manufacturer	Shirt sponsor (front)	Shirt sponsor (back)	Shorts sponsor
Avellino	(Italy) Walter Taccone	(Italy) Massimo Rastelli	Givova	Metaedil.com	NGM Mobile	CAME Cancelli Automatici
Bari	(Italy) Gianluca Paparesta	(Italy) Roberto Alberti	Erreà	Bari, Fashion District/SuisseGas	NGM Mobile	CAME Cancelli Automatici
Brescia	(Italy) Gino Corioni	(Italy) Ivo Iaconi	Adidas	UBI Banco di Brescia, Tescoma	NGM Mobile	CAME Cancelli Automatici
Carpi	(Italy) Claudio Caliumi	(Italy) Giuseppe Pillon	Sportika	Blumarine, CAVA International	NGM Mobile	CAME Cancelli Automatici
Cesena	(Italy) Giorgio Lugaresi	(Italy) Pierpaolo Bisoli	Erreà	Aldini Costruzioni	NGM Mobile	CAME Cancelli Automatici
Cittadella	(Italy) Andrea Gabrielli	(Italy) Claudio Foscarini	Garman	Gruppo Gabrielli (H)/Gavinox (A), Metalservice	NGM Mobile	CAME Cancelli Automatici
Crotone	(Italy) Raffaele Vrenna	(Italy) Massimo Drago	Zeus	V&V Group	NGM Mobile	CAME Cancelli Automatici
Empoli	(Italy) Fabrizio Corsi	(Italy) Maurizio Sarri	Royal	NGM Mobile, Computer Gross	NGM Mobile	CAME Cancelli Automatici
Juve Stabia	(Italy) Francesco Manniello	(Italy) Piero Braglia	Fly Line	Abarth Tales, Marigo	NGM Mobile	CAME Cancelli Automatici
Latina	(Italy) Paola Cavicchi	(Italy) Roberto Breda	Givova	Bricofer, Recoma Group	NGM Mobile	CAME Cancelli Automatici
Modena	(Italy) Angelo Forcina	(Italy) Walter Novellino	Erreà	CPL Concordia, CoopGas	NGM Mobile	CAME Cancelli Automatici
Novara	(Italy) Carlo Accornero	(Italy) Alfredo Aglietti	Joma	Banca Popolare di Novara, Comoli Ferrari	NGM Mobile	CAME Cancelli Automatici
Padova	(Italy) Diego Penocchio	(Italy) Michele Serena	Joma	Famila, Birra Antoniani	NGM Mobile	CAME Cancelli Automatici
Palermo	(Italy) Maurizio Zamparini	(Italy) Giuseppe Iachini	Puma	palermocalcio.it, Supermercato Sigma	NGM Mobile	CAME Cancelli Automatici
Pescara	(Italy) Daniele Sebastiani	(Italy) Serse Cosmi	Erreà	Acqua & Sapone, Officina Meccanica Angelucci	NGM Mobile	CAME Cancelli Automatici
Reggina	(Italy) Giuseppe Ranieri	(Italy) Franco Gagliardi & (Italy) Diego Zanin	Lotto	Ciao Telecom, Stocco & Stocco	NGM Mobile	CAME Cancelli Automatici
Siena	(Italy) Massimo Mezzaroma	(Italy) Mario Beretta	Kappa	None	NGM Mobile	CAME Cancelli Automatici
Spezia	(Italy) Lamberto Tacoli	(Italy) Devis Mangia	Lotto	Carispezia	NGM Mobile	CAME Cancelli Automatici
Ternana	(Italy) Edoardo Longarini	(Italy) Attilio Tesser	Macron	Family Banker Office	NGM Mobile	CAME Cancelli Automatici
Trapani	(Italy) Vittorio Morace	(Italy) Roberto Boscaglia	Macron	Ustica Lines, Regione Sicilia-Comune di Trapani	NGM Mobile	CAME Cancelli Automatici
Varese	(Italy) Nicola Laurenza	(Italy) Stefano Bettinelli	Zeus	Oro in Euro, R.invest	NGM Mobile	CAME Cancelli Automatici
Virtus Lanciano	(Italy) Valentina Maio	(Italy) Marco Baroni	Legea	Gruppo Maio, wemblegg.com	NGM Mobile	CAME Cancelli Automatici

=== Managerial changes ===
Team	Outgoing manager	Manner of departure	Date of vacancy	Position in table	Replaced by	Date of appointment
Bari	Vincenzo Torrente	Mutual consent	30 June 2013	Pre Season	Carmine Gautieri	15 July 2013
Brescia	Alessandro Calori	Mutual consent	30 June 2013	Pre Season	Marco Giampaolo	2 July 2013
Carpi	Fabio Brini	End of contract	30 June 2013	Pre Season	Stefano Vecchi	17 July 2013
Latina	Stefano Sanderra	End of contract	30 June 2013	Pre Season	Gaetano Auteri	1 July 2013
Padova	Fulvio Pea	Mutual consent	30 June 2013	Pre Season	Dario Marcolin	3 July 2013
Palermo	Giuseppe Sannino	Mutual consent	30 June 2013	Pre Season	Gennaro Gattuso	1 July 2013
Pescara	Cristian Bucchi	End of caretaker spell	30 June 2013	Pre Season	Pasquale Marino	1 July 2013
Reggina	Giuseppe Pillon	End of contract	30 June 2013	Pre Season	Gianluca Atzori	1 July 2013
Siena	Giuseppe Iachini	End of contract	30 June 2013	Pre Season	Mario Beretta	16 July 2013
Spezia	Luigi Cagni	End of contract	30 June 2013	Pre Season	Giovanni Stroppa	1 July 2013
Varese	Andrea Agostinelli	End of contract	30 June 2013	Pre Season	Stefano Sottili	1 July 2013
Virtus Lanciano	Carmine Gautieri	Mutual consent	30 June 2013	Pre Season	Marco Baroni	1 July 2013
Bari	Carmine Gautieri	Resigned	3 August 2013	Pre Season	Roberto Alberti	5 August 2013
Latina	Gaetano Auteri	Sacked	10 September 2013	22nd	Roberto Breda	12 September 2013
Palermo	Gennaro Gattuso	Sacked	25 September 2013	9th	Giuseppe Iachini	25 September 2013
Brescia	Marco Giampaolo	Mutual consent	25 September 2013	10th	Luigi Maifredi	25 September 2013
Padova	Dario Marcolin	Sacked	28 September 2013	20th	Bortolo Mutti	28 September 2013
Brescia	Luigi Maifredi	End of caretaker spell	30 September 2013	15th	Cristiano Bergodi	30 September 2013
Reggina	Gianluca Atzori	Sacked	21 October 2013	20th	Fabrizio Castori	21 October 2013
Novara	Alfredo Aglietti	Sacked	18 November 2013	18th	Alessandro Calori	18 November 2013
Juve Stabia	Piero Braglia	Sacked	23 November 2013	22nd	Fulvio Pea	25 November 2013
Varese	Stefano Sottili	Sacked	26 November 2013	10th	Carmine Gautieri	26 November 2013
Reggina	Fabrizio Castori	Sacked	3 December 2013	20th	Gianluca Atzori	3 December 2013
Spezia	Giovanni Stroppa	Sacked	15 December 2013	9th	Devis Mangia	16 December 2013
Ternana	Domenico Toscano	Sacked	31 December 2013	18th	Attilio Tesser	31 December 2013
Reggina	Gianluca Atzori	Sacked	7 January 2014	21st	Franco Gagliardi	7 January 2014
Padova	Bortolo Mutti	Sacked	2 February 2014	20th	Michele Serena	2 February 2014
Novara	Alessandro Calori	Sacked	16 February 2014	18th	Alfredo Aglietti	16 February 2014
Juve Stabia	Fulvio Pea	Sacked	22 February 2014	22nd	Piero Braglia	22 February 2014
Pescara	Pasquale Marino	Sacked	22 February 2014	13th	Serse Cosmi	24 February 2014
Brescia	Cristiano Bergodi	Sacked	3 March 2014	13th	Ivo Iaconi	4 March 2014
Varese	Carmine Gautieri	Sacked	15 March 2014	15th	Stefano Sottili	15 March 2014
Carpi	Stefano Vecchi	Sacked	17 March 2014	12th	Giuseppe Pillon	17 March 2014
Varese	Stefano Sottili	Sacked	17 May 2014	18th	Stefano Bettinelli	19 May 2014

== League table ==
Pos	Team	Pld	W	D	L	GF	GA	GD	Pts	Promotion or relegation
1	Palermo (C, P)	42	25	11	6	62	28	+34	86	Promotion to Serie A
2	Empoli (P)	42	20	12	10	59	35	+24	72	Promotion to Serie A
3	Latina	42	18	14	10	44	36	+8	68	Qualification to promotion play-offs semi-finals
4	Cesena (O, P)	42	17	15	10	45	35	+10	66	Qualification to promotion play-offs semi-finals
5	Modena	42	16	16	10	65	43	+22	64	Qualification to promotion play-offs preliminary round
6	Crotone	42	17	12	13	56	52	+4	63 (Note: BAR 1-2 CRO; CRO 0-0 BAR)	Qualification to promotion play-offs preliminary round
7	Bari (Note: Bari was docked 3 points due to the 2011 Italian football scandal and 1 point for financial irregularities.)	42	19	10	13	52	43	+9	63	Qualification to promotion play-offs preliminary round
8	Spezia	42	16	14	12	46	48	−2	62	Qualification to promotion play-offs preliminary round
9	Siena (Note: Siena was docked 8 points for financial irregularities; subsequently not admitted for next season.) (E, R, R)	42	18	15	9	57	41	+16	61	Relegation to Serie D
10	Virtus Lanciano	42	15	15	12	44	45	−1	60	
11	Avellino	42	15	14	13	48	45	+3	59 (Note: AVE: 7 pts; CAR: 5 pts; BRE: 4 pts)	
12	Carpi	42	16	11	15	50	49	+1	59	
13	Brescia	42	15	14	13	56	53	+3	59	
14	Trapani	42	14	15	13	58	54	+4	57	
15	Pescara	42	13	13	16	50	53	−3	52	
16	Ternana	42	12	15	15	54	56	−2	51	
17	Cittadella	42	11	14	17	42	49	−7	47 (Note: VAR 2-1 CIT; CIT 5-1 VAR)	
18	Varese	42	12	11	19	51	63	−12	47	Qualification for relegation playoff
19	Novara (R)	42	10	14	18	40	58	−18	44	Qualification for relegation playoff
20	Padova (R, E, R)	42	10	11	21	45	63	−18	41	Relegation to Serie D (Note: Padova went bankrupt and folded after non-admission by Lega Pro.)
21	Reggina (Note: Reggina was docked 3 points for financial irregularities.) (R)	42	6	11	25	38	70	−32	26	Relegation to Divisione Unica
22	Juve Stabia (R)	42	2	13	27	37	80	−43	19	Relegation to Divisione Unica

Source: Lega Serie B
Rules for classification: 1) points; 2) head-to-head points; 3) head-to-head goal difference; 4) head-to-head goals scored; 5) goal difference; 6) number of goals scored.
(C) Champions; (E) Eliminated; (O) Play-off winners; (P) Promoted; (R) Relegated
Notes:

When rumors about Siena's probable collapse arrived to the FIGC in May, the Federation decided to seize the opportunity to reduce the league. However, Novara appealed the decision in June. When the CONI agreed with the Piedmontese club, the angry FIGC decided to choose a Lega Pro team instead of Novara.

== Play-offs ==
=== Promotion play-offs ===
Starting from this season, six teams played in the promotion playoffs instead of four. A preliminary one-legged round, played at the home venue of the best placed one, involved the teams from 5th to 8th place. The two winning teams then play against 3rd of 4th-placed teams in a two-legged semifinal. The higher placed team plays the second leg of the promotion playoff at home. If scores are tied after both games in the semifinals the higher placed team progresses to the final. The same conditions apply to the final except for there being extra time played if scores are tied after both games, the higher placed team will be promoted if scores are still level at the end of this period.

Preliminary round
6	Crotone	0
7	Bari	3
5	Modena	1
8	Spezia	0

Semi-finals
7	Bari	2	2	4
3	Latina	2	2	4
5	Modena	0	1	1
4	Cesena	1	1	2

Two-legged final
3	Latina	1	1	2
4	Cesena	2	2	4

=== Relegation play-out ===
In case of an aggregate tie, the best placed team wins.

Team 1	Agg.	Team 2	1st leg	2nd leg
Novara (19)	2–4	(18) Varese	0–2	2–2

== Results ==
Home \ Away	AVE	BAR	BRE	CRP	CES	CIT	CRO	EMP	JST	LAT	MOD	NOV	PAD	PAL	PES	REG	SIE	SPE	TER	TRA	VAR	VLN
Avellino	—	1–0	0–1	4–1	0–0	1–0	2–0	1–0	2–1	1–1	2–1	2–1	2–1	0–2	1–1	3–0	0–1	2–0	1–0	3–3	1–1	1–3
Bari	1–0	—	0–0	2–2	0–0	1–0	1–2	3–0	3–0	1–0	1–0	4–1	2–2	2–1	1–0	0–1	2–1	1–2	2–1	1–1	2–1	1–0
Brescia	0–2	2–1	—	0–2	0–0	4–1	1–2	1–3	4–1	0–2	0–1	1–1	3–1	1–1	3–0	2–1	2–2	0–2	1–1	3–3	4–2	2–2
Carpi	1–1	1–2	0–0	—	1–2	0–1	1–2	0–2	1–0	1–1	2–2	1–0	1–1	1–0	2–0	0–3	0–1	1–1	1–2	3–2	1–0	2–2
Cesena	2–0	2–1	0–3	4–1	—	2–2	1–0	1–0	1–0	1–3	1–1	2–0	0–1	0–0	1–1	3–1	1–1	0–2	1–1	2–2	1–0	0–1
Cittadella	1–2	1–1	0–1	1–0	1–0	—	1–0	2–2	0–2	0–0	0–1	2–2	1–0	0–2	0–1	0–0	1–0	1–2	2–2	2–2	5–1	1–2
Crotone	3–2	0–0	1–0	0–0	1–2	2–0	—	1–1	1–1	0–1	3–1	2–2	2–1	1–2	3–0	2–0	0–0	1–0	1–1	2–1	3–2	1–2
Empoli	0–1	1–1	2–2	1–1	0–0	0–1	3–1	—	2–1	3–1	2–1	3–1	3–1	1–1	2–0	4–0	0–0	2–0	1–0	1–1	2–0	3–0
Juve Stabia	2–2	1–1	1–2	0–2	0–2	1–1	2–2	0–2	—	1–1	1–1	1–2	1–1	0–3	2–1	1–1	2–2	1–2	2–3	2–3	2–4	0–1
Latina	1–1	1–0	2–0	1–0	0–0	1–0	2–3	2–1	1–0	—	0–0	4–1	3–0	1–3	0–2	1–0	0–3	0–0	2–0	0–1	0–3	0–0
Modena	1–0	4–0	0–1	2–3	0–0	2–0	2–0	0–0	4–2	4–0	—	3–1	3–1	1–1	0–1	3–0	1–1	0–0	3–3	3–1	4–1	1–0
Novara	2–1	0–1	1–2	1–0	1–1	2–2	1–1	0–1	2–0	2–2	1–0	—	1–0	0–1	0–0	1–0	2–1	2–0	1–1	3–1	0–0	0–3
Padova	2–1	1–2	0–0	1–4	0–1	0–4	0–0	0–1	2–1	0–0	2–2	1–0	—	0–3	2–1	2–2	2–2	1–0	1–1	0–2	3–2	5–1
Palermo	2–0	2–1	2–0	1–2	2–1	3–1	0–0	1–2	3–0	1–2	0–0	2–1	1–0	—	1–0	1–0	1–1	1–1	1–0	3–0	0–0	1–1
Pescara	1–1	0–1	3–3	4–2	2–0	1–1	2–2	1–2	3–0	0–1	2–2	0–0	1–0	1–2	—	2–2	1–0	1–1	2–1	0–1	1–2	2–2
Reggina	1–1	0–0	1–1	0–1	1–2	0–1	1–4	2–1	3–1	0–1	2–2	1–1	2–1	0–2	2–3	—	0–2	1–2	1–2	1–1	3–4	1–0
Siena	3–0	3–2	2–1	0–0	1–0	1–1	5–2	1–1	1–0	1–0	1–3	1–0	2–0	2–3	1–3	2–1	—	2–0	1–1	2–1	1–1	1–0
Spezia	0–0	2–0	2–2	0–2	2–1	0–0	3–1	1–3	1–1	1–4	2–1	0–0	2–2	1–0	0–1	2–1	1–0	—	2–2	0–1	2–1	2–0
Ternana	1–1	1–3	1–2	1–0	0–2	2–1	2–3	1–0	1–1	1–0	1–1	5–0	2–1	1–2	1–0	2–1	2–2	1–2	—	0–2	2–0	1–1
Trapani	1–1	3–4	0–1	0–1	0–1	1–2	1–0	0–0	3–0	1–1	2–0	2–1	2–1	0–1	2–2	4–0	0–2	1–1	2–1	—	1–1	1–0
Varese	1–1	0–1	1–2	0–2	1–3	2–1	2–0	1–0	2–2	0–0	1–1	1–1	0–3	1–2	3–2	1–0	2–0	4–0	2–1	0–0	—	0–1
Virtus Lanciano	1–0	1–0	1–0	1–3	1–1	0–0	0–1	2–1	1–0	0–0	1–3	2–1	1–0	1–1	0–1	1–1	1–1	2–2	1–1	2–2	2–0	—

Source: Lega Serie B
Legend: Blue = home team win; Yellow = draw; Red = away team win.

== Top goalscorers ==
As of 18 June 2014.

Rank	Player	Club	Goals
1	(Italy) Matteo Mancosu	Trapani	26
2	(Italy) Francesco Tavano	Empoli	23
3	(Italy) Leonardo Pavoletti^{1}	Varese	22
4	(Senegal) Khouma Babacar	Modena	20
5	(Italy) Andrea Caracciolo	Brescia	19
5	(Italy) Mirco Antenucci	Ternana	19
7	(Brazil) Jonathas^{2}	Latina	15
7	(Bulgaria) Andrey Galabinov	Avellino	15
9	(Italy) Massimo Maccarone	Empoli	14
9	(Uruguay) Abel Hernández	Palermo	14

1. - includes 2 goals in the play-offs.
2. - includes 1 goal in the play-offs.

== Attendances ==
#	Club	Average
1	Bari	11,569
2	Palermo	11,129
3	Cesena	10,724
4	Pescara	8,739
5	Avellino	8,000
6	Spezia	6,134
7	Siena	5,984
8	Padova	5,690
9	Latina	5,352
10	Ternana	5,352
11	Trapani	5,179
12	Modena	5,116
13	Novara	5,069
14	Crotone	4,590
15	Empoli	4,421
16	Reggina	4,324
17	Brescia	4,233
18	Varese	3,539
19	Virtus Lanciano	3,083
20	Cittadella	2,598
21	Carpi	2,420
22	Juve Stabia	2,390
