= 2012–13 Serie A =

111th season of top-tier Italian football

Serie A
- Season: 2012–13
- Dates: 25 August 2012 – 19 May 2013
- Champions: Juventus; 29th title
- Relegated: Palermo; Siena; Pescara
- Champions League: Juventus; Napoli; Milan
- Europa League: Fiorentina; Udinese; Lazio
- Matches: 380
- Goals: 1,000 (2.63 per match)
- Top goalscorer: Edinson Cavani (29 goals)
- Biggest home win: Sampdoria 6–0 Pescara; Lazio 6–0 Bologna
- Biggest away win: Pescara 1–6 Juventus
- Highest scoring: Torino 3–5 Napoli
- Longest winning run: 9 games Juventus
- Longest unbeaten run: 14 games Milan
- Longest winless run: 19 games Pescara
- Longest losing run: 8 games Pescara
- Highest attendance: 79,341; Internazionale 1–1 Milan
- Lowest attendance: 6,300; Udinese 1–1 Palermo
- Average attendance: 24,655

The 2012–13 Serie A (known as the Serie A TIM for sponsorship reasons) was the 111th season of top-tier Italian football, the 81st in a round-robin tournament, and the 3rd since its organization under a league committee separate from Serie B. It began on 25 August 2012 and ended on 19 May 2013. Juventus were the defending champions.

A total of 20 teams contested the league, comprising 17 sides from the 2011–12 season and three promoted from the 2011–12 Serie B. As in the previous years, Nike provided the official ball for all matches, with a new Nike Maxim Serie A model to be used throughout the season for all matches.

On 21 August 2012, FIGC allowed Serie A teams to have up to 12 substitution players on the bench for each game.

== Events ==
The 2012–13 season features the return of Pescara, Torino, and Sampdoria, who were promoted back to Serie A after nineteen, three, and one years respectively. It is also Cagliari's first season out of Stadio Sant'Elia after more than 40 years, following its closure due to safety issues; as a replacement, the team agreed to renovate the Stadio Is Arenas located in Quartu Sant'Elena, in order to use it as its home venue for this season (Cagliari has ongoing plans to build its own brand-new stadium in the next few years). The fixtures were presented on 26 July in a lavish hour-long televised ceremony.

== Teams ==
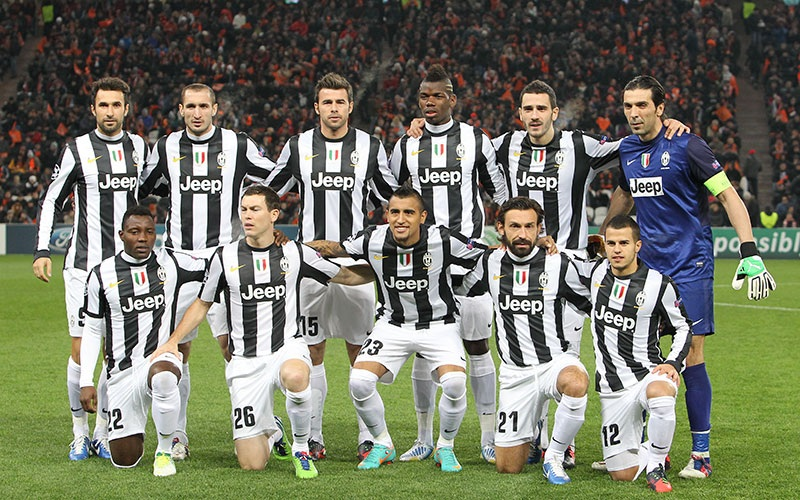
2012–13 Juventus team

Locations of the 2012–13 Serie A teams

=== Stadiums and locations ===
Team	Location	Stadium	Capacity	2011–12 season
Atalanta	Bergamo	Stadio Atleti Azzurri d'Italia	26,542	12th in Serie A
Bologna	Bologna	Stadio Renato Dall'Ara	38,279	9th in Serie A
Cagliari	Cagliari	Stadio Is Arenas	16,214	15th in Serie A
Catania	Catania	Stadio Angelo Massimino	23,420	11th in Serie A
Chievo Verona	Verona	Stadio Marcantonio Bentegodi	38,402	10th in Serie A
Fiorentina	Florence	Stadio Artemio Franchi	47,282	13th in Serie A
Genoa	Genoa	Stadio Luigi Ferraris	36,685	17th in Serie A
Internazionale	Milan	San Siro	80,074	6th in Serie A
Juventus	Turin	Juventus Stadium	41,254	Serie A champions
Lazio	Rome	Stadio Olimpico	72,698	4th in Serie A
Milan	Milan	San Siro	80,074	Serie A Runner-up
Napoli	Naples	Stadio San Paolo	60,240	5th in Serie A
Palermo	Palermo	Stadio Renzo Barbera	37,242	16th in Serie A
Parma	Parma	Stadio Ennio Tardini	27,906	8th in Serie A
Pescara	Pescara	Stadio Adriatico – Giovanni Cornacchia	24,500	Serie B champions
Roma	Rome	Stadio Olimpico	72,698	7th in Serie A
Sampdoria	Genoa	Stadio Luigi Ferraris	36,685	Serie B play-off winners
Siena	Siena	Stadio Artemio Franchi – Montepaschi Arena	15,373	14th in Serie A
Torino	Turin	Stadio Olimpico Grande Torino	27,994	Serie B Runner-up
Udinese	Udine	Stadio Friuli	30,642	3rd in Serie A

=== Personnel and kits ===
Team	Manager	Captain	Kitmaker	Shirt sponsor
Atalanta	(Italy) Stefano Colantuono	(Italy) Gianpaolo Bellini	Erreà	AXA, Konica Minolta
Bologna	(Italy) Stefano Pioli	(Italy) Alessandro Diamanti	Macron	NGM Mobile, Serenissima Ceramica
Cagliari	(Italy) Ivo Pulga	(Italy) Daniele Conti	Kappa	Sardegna, Tirrenia
Catania	(Italy) Rolando Maran	(Italy) Marco Biagianti	Givova	Arancia Rossa di Sicilia, TTT Lines
Chievo	(Italy) Eugenio Corini	(Italy) Sergio Pellissier	Givova	Paluani/Banca Popolare di Verona/youbanking.it, Midac Batteries
Fiorentina	(Italy) Vincenzo Montella	(Italy) Manuel Pasqual	Joma	Mazda, Save the Children
Genoa	(Italy) Davide Ballardini	(Italy) Marco Rossi	Lotto	iZiPlay
Internazionale	(Italy) Andrea Stramaccioni	(Argentina) Javier Zanetti	Nike	Pirelli
Juventus	(Italy) Antonio Conte	(Italy) Gianluigi Buffon	Nike	Jeep
Lazio	(Switzerland) Vladimir Petković	(Italy) Stefano Mauri	Macron	Clinica Paideia
Milan	(Italy) Massimiliano Allegri	(Italy) Massimo Ambrosini	Adidas	Fly Emirates
Napoli	(Italy) Walter Mazzarri	(Italy) Paolo Cannavaro	Macron	Lete, MSC Cruises
Palermo	(Italy) Giuseppe Sannino	(Italy) Fabrizio Miccoli	Puma	Eurobet, Italiacom
Parma	(Italy) Roberto Donadoni	(Italy) Stefano Morrone	Erreà	Folletto, Navigare
Pescara	(Italy) Cristian Bucchi	(Italy) Emmanuel Cascione	Erreà	Acqua Santa Croce, Risparmio Casa
Roma	(Italy) Aurelio Andreazzoli	(Italy) Francesco Totti	Kappa	Wind
Sampdoria	(Italy) Delio Rossi	(Italy) Daniele Gastaldello	Kappa	Gamenet
Siena	(Italy) Giuseppe Iachini	(Italy) Simone Vergassola	Kappa	Banca Monte dei Paschi di Siena
Torino	(Italy) Giampiero Ventura	(Italy) Rolando Bianchi	Kappa	Frattelli Beretta, Aruba.it
Udinese	(Italy) Francesco Guidolin	(Italy) Antonio Di Natale	Legea	Dacia, QBell

=== Managerial changes ===
Team	Outgoing manager	Manner of departure	Date of vacancy	Position in table	Replaced by	Date of appointment
Palermo	(Italy) Bortolo Mutti	End of contract	13 May 2012	Pre-season	(Italy) Giuseppe Sannino	6 June 2012
Fiorentina	(Italy) Vincenzo Guerini	End of contract	13 May 2012	Pre-season	(Italy) Vincenzo Montella	11 June 2012
Roma	(Spain) Luis Enrique	Mutual consent	13 May 2012	Pre-season	(Czech Republic) Zdeněk Zeman	4 June 2012
Lazio	(Italy) Edoardo Reja	Mutual consent	18 May 2012	Pre-season	(Switzerland) Vladimir Petković	2 June 2012
Pescara	(Czech Republic) Zdeněk Zeman	Signed by Roma	4 June 2012	Pre-season	(Italy) Giovanni Stroppa	8 June 2012
Catania	(Italy) Vincenzo Montella	Mutual consent	4 June 2012	Pre-season	(Italy) Rolando Maran	11 June 2012
Siena	(Italy) Giuseppe Sannino	Mutual consent	6 June 2012	Pre-season	(Italy) Serse Cosmi	27 June 2012
Sampdoria	(Italy) Giuseppe Iachini	Mutual consent	2 July 2012	Pre-season	(Italy) Ciro Ferrara	2 July 2012
Palermo	(Italy) Giuseppe Sannino	Sacked	16 September 2012	18th	(Italy) Gian Piero Gasperini	16 September 2012
Chievo	(Italy) Domenico Di Carlo	Sacked	2 October 2012	18th	(Italy) Eugenio Corini	2 October 2012
Cagliari	(Italy) Massimo Ficcadenti	Sacked	2 October 2012	20th	(Italy) Ivo Pulga	2 October 2012
Genoa	(Italy) Luigi De Canio	Sacked	22 October 2012	9th	(Italy) Luigi Delneri	22 October 2012
Pescara	(Italy) Giovanni Stroppa	Resigned	18 November 2012	18th	(Italy) Cristiano Bergodi	20 November 2012
Siena	(Italy) Serse Cosmi	Sacked	17 December 2012	20th	(Italy) Giuseppe Iachini	17 December 2012
Sampdoria	(Italy) Ciro Ferrara	Sacked	17 December 2012	14th	(Italy) Delio Rossi	17 December 2012
Genoa	(Italy) Luigi Delneri	Sacked	21 January 2013	18th	(Italy) Davide Ballardini	21 January 2013
Roma	(Czech Republic) Zdeněk Zeman	Sacked	2 February 2013	8th	(Italy) Aurelio Andreazzoli	2 February 2013
Palermo	(Italy) Gian Piero Gasperini	Sacked	4 February 2013	20th	(Italy) Alberto Malesani	5 February 2013
Palermo	(Italy) Alberto Malesani	Sacked	24 February 2013	20th	(Italy) Gian Piero Gasperini	24 February 2013
Pescara	(Italy) Cristiano Bergodi	Sacked	3 March 2013	20th	(Italy) Cristian Bucchi	5 March 2013
Palermo	(Italy) Gian Piero Gasperini	Mutual consent	11 March 2013	20th	(Italy) Giuseppe Sannino	12 March 2013

== League table ==
Pos	Team	Pld	W	D	L	GF	GA	GD	Pts	Qualification or relegation
1	Juventus (C)	38	27	6	5	71	24	+47	87	Qualification for the Champions League group stage
2	Napoli	38	23	9	6	73	36	+37	78	Qualification for the Champions League group stage
3	Milan	38	21	9	8	67	39	+28	72	Qualification for the Champions League play-off round
4	Fiorentina	38	21	7	10	72	44	+28	70	Qualification for the Europa League play-off round
5	Udinese	38	18	12	8	59	45	+14	66	Qualification for the Europa League third qualifying round
6	Roma	38	18	8	12	71	56	+15	62	
7	Lazio	38	18	7	13	51	42	+9	61	Qualification for the Europa League group stage (Note: Lazio qualified for the 2013–14 UEFA Europa League group stage after winning 2012–13 Coppa Italia.)
8	Catania	38	15	11	12	50	46	+4	56	
9	Inter Milan	38	16	6	16	55	57	−2	54	
10	Parma	38	13	10	15	45	46	−1	49	
11	Cagliari	38	12	11	15	43	55	−12	47	
12	Chievo	38	12	9	17	37	52	−15	45	
13	Bologna	38	11	11	16	46	52	−6	44	
14	Sampdoria	38	11	10	17	43	51	−8	42 (Note: Sampdoria and Torino were docked 1 point due to involvement in the 2011–12 Italian football scandal.)	
15	Atalanta	38	11	9	18	39	56	−17	40 (Note: Atalanta was docked 2 points due to involvement in the 2011–12 Italian football scandal.)	
16	Torino	38	8	16	14	46	55	−9	39	
17	Genoa	38	8	14	16	38	52	−14	38	
18	Palermo (R)	38	6	14	18	34	54	−20	32	Relegation to Serie B
19	Siena (R)	38	9	9	20	36	57	−21	30 (Note: Siena was docked 6 points due to involvement in the 2011–12 Italian football scandal.)	Relegation to Serie B
20	Pescara (R)	38	6	4	28	27	84	−57	22	Relegation to Serie B

Source: Serie A, Soccerway
Rules for classification: 1st points; 2nd head-to-head points; 3rd head-to-head goal difference; 4th goal difference; 5th number of goals scored; 6th public draw.
(Head-to-head record is applied for clubs with the same number of points only once all matches between said clubs have been played)
(C) Champions; (R) Relegated

== Results ==
Home \ Away	ATA	BOL	CAG	CTN	CHV	FIO	GEN	INT	JUV	LAZ	MIL	NAP	PAL	PAR	PES	ROM	SAM	SIE	TOR	UDI
Atalanta		1–1	1–1	0–0	2–2	0–2	0–1	3–2	0–1	0–1	0–1	1–0	1–0	2–1	2–1	2–3	0–0	2–1	1–5	1–1
Bologna	2–1		3–0	4–0	4–0	2–1	0–0	1–3	0–2	0–0	1–3	0–3	3–0	1–2	1–1	3–3	1–1	1–1	2–2	1–1
Cagliari	1–1	1–0		0–0	0–2	2–1	2–1	2–0	1–3	1–0	1–1	0–1	1–1	0–1	1–2	0–3	3–1	4–2	4–3	0–1
Catania	2–1	1–0	0–0		2–1	2–1	3–2	2–3	0–1	4–0	1–3	0–0	1–1	2–0	1–0	1–0	3–1	3–0	0–0	3–1
Chievo	1–0	2–0	0–0	0–0		1–1	0–1	0–2	1–2	1–3	0–1	2–0	1–1	1–1	2–0	1–0	2–1	0–0	1–1	2–2
Fiorentina	4–1	1–0	4–1	2–0	2–1		3–2	4–1	0–0	2–0	2–2	1–1	1–0	2–0	0–2	0–1	2–2	4–1	4–3	2–1
Genoa	1–1	2–0	2–0	0–2	2–4	0–1		0–0	1–3	3–2	0–2	2–4	1–1	1–1	4–1	2–4	1–1	2–2	1–1	1–0
Internazionale	3–4	0–1	2–2	2–0	3–1	2–1	1–1		1–2	1–3	1–1	2–1	1–0	1–0	2–0	1–3	3–2	0–2	2–2	2–5
Juventus	3–0	2–1	1–1	1–0	2–0	2–0	1–1	1–3		0–0	1–0	2–0	1–0	2–0	2–1	4–1	1–2	3–0	3–0	4–0
Lazio	2–0	6–0	2–1	2–1	0–1	0–2	0–1	1–0	0–2		3–2	1–1	3–0	2–1	2–0	3–2	2–0	2–1	1–1	3–0
Milan	0–1	2–1	2–0	4–2	5–1	1–3	1–0	0–1	1–0	3–0		1–1	2–0	2–1	4–1	0–0	0–1	2–1	1–0	2–1
Napoli	3–2	2–3	3–2	2–0	1–0	2–1	2–0	3–1	1–1	3–0	2–2		3–0	3–1	5–1	4–1	0–0	2–1	1–1	2–1
Palermo	1–2	1–1	1–1	3–1	4–1	0–3	0–0	1–0	0–1	2–2	2–2	0–3		1–3	1–1	2–0	2–0	1–2	0–0	2–3
Parma	2–0	0–2	4–1	1–2	2–0	1–1	0–0	1–0	1–1	0–0	1–1	1–2	2–1		3–0	3–2	2–1	0–0	4–1	0–3
Pescara	0–0	2–3	0–2	2–1	0–2	1–5	2–0	0–3	1–6	0–3	0–4	0–3	1–0	2–0		0–1	2–3	2–3	0–2	0–1
Roma	2–0	2–3	2–4	2–2	0–1	4–2	3–1	1–1	1–0	1–1	4–2	2–1	4–1	2–0	1–1		1–1	4–0	2–0	2–3
Sampdoria	1–2	1–0	0–1	1–1	2–0	0–3	3–1	0–2	3–2	0–1	0–0	0–1	1–3	1–0	6–0	3–1		2–1	1–1	0–2
Siena	0–2	1–0	0–0	1–3	0–1	0–1	1–0	3–1	1–2	3–0	1–2	0–2	0–0	0–0	1–0	1–3	1–0		0–0	2–2
Torino	2–1	1–0	0–1	2–2	2–0	2–2	0–0	0–2	0–2	1–0	2–4	3–5	0–0	1–3	3–0	1–2	0–0	3–2		0–0
Udinese	2–1	0–0	4–1	2–2	3–1	3–1	0–0	3–0	1–4	1–0	2–1	0–0	1–1	2–2	1–0	1–1	3–1	1–0	1–0	

Source: Lega Serie A
Legend: Blue = home team win; Yellow = draw; Red = away team win.

== Season statistics ==
=== Top goalscorers ===
Rank	Player	Club	Goals
1	(Uruguay) Edinson Cavani	Napoli	29
2	(Italy) Antonio Di Natale	Udinese	23
3	(Italy) Stephan El Shaarawy	Milan	16
3	(Italy) Dani Osvaldo	Roma	16
5	(Argentina) Germán Denis	Atalanta	15
5	(Germany) Miroslav Klose	Lazio	15
5	(Argentina) Erik Lamela	Roma	15
5	(Italy) Giampaolo Pazzini	Milan	15
9	(Argentina) Gonzalo Bergessio	Catania	13
9	(Italy) Alberto Gilardino	Bologna	13
9	(Montenegro) Stevan Jovetić	Fiorentina	13

=== Scoring ===
- First goal of the season: Maicosuel for Udinese against Fiorentina (25 August 2012)
- Fastest goal of the season: 18 seconds
  - Arturo Vidal for Juventus against Internazionale (3 November 2012)
- Latest goal of the season: 90+5 minutes
  - Panagiotis Kone for Bologna against Catania (30 September 2012)
  - Josip Iličić for Palermo against Catania (21 April 2013)
- Largest winning margin: 6 goals
  - Sampdoria 6–0 Pescara (27 January 2013)
  - Lazio 6–0 Bologna (5 May 2013)
- Highest scoring game: 8 goals
  - Torino 3–5 Napoli (30 March 2013)
- Most goals scored by a single team: 6 goals
  - Pescara 1–6 Juventus (10 November 2012)
  - Sampdoria 6–0 Pescara (27 January 2013)
  - Lazio 6–0 Bologna (5 May 2013)
- Most goals scored by a losing team: 3 goals
  - Cagliari 4–3 Torino (24 February 2013)
  - Torino 3–5 Napoli (30 March 2013)
  - Internazionale 3–4 Atalanta (7 April 2013)
  - Fiorentina 4–3 Torino (21 April 2013)

=== Clean sheets ===
- Most clean sheets: 19
  - Juventus
- Fewest clean sheets: 5
  - Pescara

=== Discipline ===
- Most yellow cards (club): 111
  - Atalanta
- Most yellow cards (player): 16
  - Daniele Conti (Cagliari)
- Most red cards (club): 13
  - Atalanta
- Most red cards (player): 2
  - Davide Astori (Cagliari)
  - Kevin-Prince Boateng (Milan)
  - Carlos Carmona (Atalanta)
  - Andrea Costa (Sampdoria)
  - Danilo (Udinese)
  - Felipe (Siena)
  - Daniele Gastaldello (Sampdoria)
  - Kamil Glik (Torino)
  - Thomas Heurtaux (Udinese)
  - Federico Peluso (Atalanta)
  - Luca Rossettini (Cagliari)
  - Vladimír Weiss (Pescara)
- Fewest yellow cards (club): 77
  - Juventus

== Awards ==
The Gran Galà del Calcio AIC 2013 recognized the best performers of the 2012–13 Serie A|2012–13 Serie A season.

Award	Winner	Club
Player of the Year	(Italy) Andrea Pirlo	Juventus
Coach of the Year	(Italy) Antonio Conte	Juventus
Best Club	Juventus	Juventus
Best Referee	(Italy) Nicola Rizzoli	

AIC Team of the Year
Goalkeeper	(Slovenia) Samir Handanović (Internazionale)			
Defence	(Italy) Christian Maggio (Napoli)	(Italy) Andrea Barzagli (Juventus)	(Italy) Giorgio Chiellini (Juventus)	(Italy) Mattia De Sciglio (Milan)
Midfield	(Spain) Borja Valero (Fiorentina)		(Italy) Andrea Pirlo (Juventus)	(Chile) Arturo Vidal (Juventus)
Attack	(Uruguay) Edinson Cavani (Napoli)		(Italy) Mario Balotelli (Milan)	(Italy) Antonio Di Natale (Udinese)

== Attendances ==
#	Club	Avg. attendance	Highest
1	Internazionale	46,551	79,341
2	AC Milan	43,651	77,023
3	AS Roma	40,179	54,981
4	SSC Napoli	39,636	58,143
5	Juventus FC	38,600	40,562
6	SS Lazio	31,992	51,461
7	ACF Fiorentina	25,665	39,469
8	UC Sampdoria	23,123	30,350
9	Bologna FC 1909	21,436	35,206
10	Genoa CFC	19,740	29,218
11	US Città di Palermo	18,287	26,597
12	Torino FC	15,615	25,753
13	Udinese Calcio	15,506	27,543
14	Atalanta BC	15,396	22,099
15	Calcio Catania	13,862	20,381
16	Parma FC	12,740	19,073
17	Pescara Calcio	12,236	21,317
18	ChievoVerona	11,553	28,000
19	AC Siena	9,582	15,373
20	Cagliari Calcio	8,551	17,000
