= Marco D'Aloia =

Italian footballer (born 2001)

Personal information
- Date of birth: 21 July 2001 (age 25)
- Place of birth: Cerreto Sannita, Italy
- Height: 1.75 m (5 ft 9 in)
- Position: Midfielder

Team information
- Current team: Paternò
- Number: 6

Youth career
- –2020: Parma
- 2020–2021: Pescara
- 2020: → Parma (loan)

Senior career*
Years	Team	Apps	(Gls)
2021–2022	Pescara	2	(0)
2021–2022	→ Latina (loan)	4	(0)
2023–2024	Notaresco	40	(0)
2024–2025	Luparense	25	(2)
2025–	Paternò	25	(2)
- * Club domestic league appearances and goals as of 22 March 2026

Marco D'Aloia (born 21 July 2001) is an Italian professional footballer who plays as a midfielder for Serie D club Paternò.

== Career ==
Born in Cerreto Sannita, D'Aloia made his youth career in Parma and Pescara.

He was promoted to Pescara first team in 2020–21 Serie B season. D'Aloia made his professional debut on 1 May 2021 against Cosenza as a late substitute.

On 31 August 2021, he was loaned to Serie C club Latina.

On 2 February 2023, D'Aloia joined Serie D club Notaresco.

On 10 October 2024, he signed with Luparense FC.

On 30 August 2025, D’Aloia joined ASD Paternò Calcio.
