= Cristiano Scazzola =

Italian footballer and coach (born 1971)

Personal information
- Full name: Cristiano Scazzola
- Date of birth: 20 July 1971 (age 55)
- Place of birth: Loano, Italy
- Position: Midfielder

Team information
- Current team: Monterosi (head coach)

Senior career*
Years	Team	Apps	(Gls)
1989–1991	Genoa	0	(0)
1991–1993	Massese	27	(1)
1993–1994	Spezia	30	(6)
1994–1996	Fiorenzuola	59	(4)
1996–1997	Genoa	10	(0)
1997–1998	Modena	39	(3)
1998–1999	Lecco	24	(5)
1999–2001	Alessandria	55	(15)
2001–2002	Monza	30	(4)
2002–2003	Lumezzane	14	(0)
2003	Paternò	11	(2)
2003–2004	Ivrea	28	(2)
2004–2006	Monza	40	(4)
2006	Pisa	6	(1)
2006–2010	Pro Belvedere Vercelli	100	(16)

Managerial career
- 2013–2015: Pro Vercelli
- 2016–2017: Robur Siena
- 2017: Casertana
- 2018–2019: Cuneo
- 2019–2020: Alessandria
- 2021–2022: Piacenza
- 2022–2023: Piacenza
- 2024–: Monterosi
- * Club domestic league appearances and goals

Cristiano Scazzola (born 20 July 1971) is an Italian football coach and former player, currently in charge of Serie D club Monterosi.

== Playing career ==
A Genoa youth product, Scazzola made his professional debut in a 1990–91 Coppa Italia game against Roma. He successively left Genoa to pursue a long career in the lower divisions, starting with Massese (Serie C1) in 1991. He made his Serie B debut in 1996, in what was a short comeback of his at Genoa. He left professional football in 2006 after a short stint with Pisa to join Vercelli-based amateurs Pro Belvedere, with whom he served as a captain in the club's historical Serie D promotion in 2009. He retired in 2010, aged 39, after a Serie C2 season in which he served contemporaneously as both player and assistant head coach.

== Coaching career ==
After retirement, Scazzola accepted a youth coach position at the club after it merged with and changed denomination to Pro Vercelli. In 2012, he took charge of the Primavera under-19 club at the club, and in 2013 he was named new head coach for the club's 2013–14 Lega Pro Prima Divisione campaign.

In his first season as a head coach, Scazzola succeeded in guiding Pro Vercelli to second place in the league, behind champions Virtus Entella, and then won the promotion playoffs to bring his club swiftly back to Serie B. He was successively confirmed as head coach of Pro Vercelli for the 2014–15 Serie B season.

As head coach of a newly promoted Serie B club, Scazzola was also successfully admitted to the yearly UEFA Pro Licence course to be held in Coverciano.

On 19 January 2020, he was dismissed by Serie C club Alessandria.

On 26 January 2021, he was hired by Serie C club Piacenza. He parted ways with Piacenza on 20 May 2022, after guiding the club to escape relegation by the end of the 2020–21 season and a mid-table placement in the following one. On 3 October 2022, he was re-hired as Piacenza manager. He was sacked on 18 February 2023 after failing to lead Piacenza out of the direct relegation zone.

On 5 February 2024, Scazzola took over at relegation-battling Serie C club Monterosi until the end of the season.
