= Maurizio Pellegrino =

Italian footballer and manager

Personal information
- Full name: Maurizio Pellegrino
- Date of birth: 1 March 1966 (age 60)
- Place of birth: Syracuse, Italy
- Height: 1.75 m (5 ft 9 in)
- Position: Midfielder

Youth career
- Siracusa

Senior career*
Years	Team	Apps	(Gls)
1982–1983	Siracusa	0	(0)
1983–1985	Catanzaro	2	(1)
1985–1986	Carbonia	0	(0)
1986–1989	Catanzaro	17	(0)
1989–1991	Francavilla	60	(4)
1991–1993	Vis Pesaro	58	(4)
1994–1997	Catania	83	(5)
1997–1999	Viterbese	34	(1)

Managerial career
- 1999–2001: Viterbese (assistant manager)
- 2001–2003: Catania
- 2003–2004: Paternò
- 2004–2005: Lanciano
- 2005–2006: Padova
- 2007–2008: Martina
- 2009: Lecco
- 2009–2010: Cassino
- 2011: Südtirol-Alto Adige
- 2011–2012: Lecco
- 2014: Catania
- 2014–2015: Catania
- * Club domestic league appearances and goals

Maurizio Pellegrino (born 1 March 1966) is a retired Italian professional football player and coach.

== Career ==
=== Player ===
Pellegrino mostly played at lower league levels with a number of teams, most notably Catanzaro in the Serie B.

=== Coach ===
Pellegrino began his coaching career in 1999 as assistant at Viterbese during the Gaucci years (Viterbese and Catania sharing the same ownership during these years). As such, he was named new Catania head coach together with Francesco Graziani in 2001, guiding the then-Serie C1 club for the final two games of the season, plus the subsequent promotion playoffs, and obtaining promotion to Serie B in the end. Confirmed as co-coach of Catania together with Graziani for the successive Serie B campaign, both were fired during the season due to poor results.

He then led Serie C1 club Paternò, failing to save it from relegation. This was followed by more experiences as Serie C1 level with a number of teams (Lanciano, Padova, Martina Franca and Lecco), and Lega Pro Seconda Divisione at Cassino.

He returned to Catania in September 2013 as youth system coordinator, and was then appointed caretaker coach on April 6, 2014, as the Sicilians were last-placed in the Serie A league. Despite a late surge in results, Catania did not ultimately succeed to avoid relegation to Serie B, but this was enough to ensure Pellegrino a new contract as full-time coach for the 2014–15 Serie B season, with the goal to promptly bring the club back into the top flight. He was however removed from his managerial duties on 14 September 2014, after achieving only two losses and a draw in the inaugural three league games.

He was reappointed at the helm of the Sicilian club on 19 December 2014, following the resignation of Giuseppe Sannino as head coach. He was removed once again from his role on 3 January 2015 due to poor results, leaving Catania in nineteenth place in the Serie B league, being also moved back to his previous job as youth system chief for the club.
