= Ivan Javorčić =

Croatian footballer

Personal information
- Date of birth: 24 January 1979 (age 47)
- Place of birth: Split, SR Croatia, Yugoslavia
- Height: 1.79 m (5 ft 10 1/2 in)
- Position: Defensive midfielder

Team information
- Current team: Tottenham Hotspur (assistant coach)

Youth career
- –1995: RNK Split

Senior career*
Years	Team	Apps	(Gls)
1995–1996	RNK Split		
1996–2001	Brescia	49	(1)
1997	→ Mosor (loan)		
2001	→ Crotone (loan)	8	(0)
2001	→ Treviso (loan)	8	(0)
2002–2003	Atalanta	0	(0)
2003–2006	Arezzo	18	(0)
2006–2007	Pizzighettone	16	(0)

Managerial career
- 2014–2015: Brescia (caretaker)
- 2015–2016: Mantova
- 2017–2021: Pro Patria
- 2021–2022: Südtirol
- 2022: Venezia
- * Club domestic league appearances and goals

Ivan Javorčić (born 24 January 1979) is a Croatian professional football manager and former player who played as a defensive midfielder. He is currently assistant coach of Premier League club Tottenham Hotspur.

== Playing career ==
Born in Split, Javorčić began playing football for the youth side of local club RNK Split. He first played for the senior team at age 15.

Javorčić spent most of his career in Italy, where he moved in 1996 to sign a four-year contract with Serie B club Brescia. After he played for one season in Serie A and two seasons in Serie B for the club, Javorčić went out on loans to Serie B club Crotone and Serie C1 club Treviso during 2001. He joined Serie A club Atalanta in 2002 but did not play for the first team. Successively, he transferred to the second division Arezzo but suffered a career-threatening knee injury in May 2004 that kept him off the field for more than two years. He returned from injury in October 2006, playing for Pizzighettone in Serie C1.

== Coaching career ==
After retiring from active football, Javorčić returned to his former club Brescia as a youth coach.

On 15 December 2014, after the dismissal of head coach Ivo Iaconi, it was announced that Javorčić would take charge of the first team on an interim basis. He was allowed to guide Brescia only for a short period due to him not having the required coaching badges.

During his short tenure as a coach, he managed to guide Brescia to a slight improvement in results despite a troubled financial situation and ended his caretaking spell on 21 January 2015 with a 3–1 home win against high-flying Frosinone before to hand over coaching duties to Salvatore Giunta.

He then served as head coach of Lega Pro club Mantova from October 2015 to March 2016. In April 2017, he was named new head coach of Serie D club Pro Patria. They advanced to third-tier Serie C at the end of the 2017–18 season, with Javorčić guiding them for the following three seasons in the league.

On 8 June 2021, Pro Patria announced Javorčić's departure from the club. On 14 June 2021, he was unveiled as the new head coach of fellow Serie C club Südtirol on a two-year contract. On his first season in charge, Javorčić guided Südtirol to triumph in the Group A of the 2021–22 Serie C, achieving promotion to Serie B for the first time in the club's history; in addition to that, he led Südtirol to make it all the way to the 2021–22 Coppa Italia Serie C finals, lost on aggregate to fellow Group A club Padova.

On 9 June 2022, Javorčić was unveiled as the new head coach of recently-relegated Serie B club Venezia, signing a three-year deal with the Lagunari. His Venezia experience turned out to be short-lived, as he was relieved from his duties on 31 October 2022 due to negative results, leaving the team down in the relegation zone of the 2022–23 Serie B league.

In March 2024, Javorčić rescinded his Venezia contract to join Igor Tudor's coaching staff at Lazio.

In March 2025, he followed Tudor at Juventus.

== Managerial statistics ==
As of match played 29 October 2022

Managerial record by team and tenure
Team	Nat	From	To	Record							
Team	Nat	From	To	G	W	D	L	GF	GA	GD	Win %
Brescia (caretaker)	(Italy)	15 December 2014	21 January 2015	4	2	1	1	7	6	+1	50.00
Mantova	(Italy)	27 October 2015	14 March 2016	18	2	9	7	13	22	−9	11.11
Pro Patria	(Italy)	17 April 2017	8 June 2021	157	70	47	40	201	188	+13	44.59
Südtirol	(Italy)	14 June 2021	9 June 2022	48	33	10	5	67	17	+50	68.75
Venezia	(Italy)	9 June 2022	31 October 2022	12	2	3	7	14	21	−7	16.67
Total				239	109	70	60	302	254	+48	45.61

== Honours ==
=== Player ===
Arezzo

- Serie C1: 2003–04 (Group A)
- Supercoppa di Serie C: 2004

=== Coach ===
Pro Patria

- Serie D: 2017–18 (Group B)
- Scudetto Dilettanti: 2017–18

Südtirol

- Serie C: 2021–22 (Group A)
