= Salvatore Giunta (footballer) =

Italian footballer and manager

Personal information
- Date of birth: 13 April 1967 (age 59)
- Place of birth: Milan, Italy
- Height: 1.81 m (5 ft 11 in)
- Position: Centre midfielder

Youth career
- AC Milan

Senior career*
Years	Team	Apps	(Gls)
1984–1985	AC Milan	1	(0)
1985–1986	Sambenedettese	7	(0)
1986–1990	Como	84	(13)
1990–1996	Brescia	174	(17)
1996	Padova	1	(0)
1996–1998	Verona	46	(2)
1998	Albacete	2	(0)
1998–1999	Cannes	7	(0)
1999–2000	Carrarese	0	(0)
2000	Teramo	23	(2)
2001–2002	Sangiovannese	15	(0)

International career
	Italy U21	5	(1)

Managerial career
- 2007–2008: Suzzara
- 2013–2014: Pergolettese
- 2015: Brescia
- * Club domestic league appearances and goals

Salvatore Giunta (born 13 April 1967) is an Italian football coach and former player, most recently in charge as manager of Serie B club Brescia.

== Playing career ==
Giunta is a former central midfielder who played for, among others, AC Milan and Albacete, as well as the Italian under-21 side.

Giunta also played for Cannes in French Ligue 2 during the 1998–99 season. (Note: Salvatore Giunta – French league stats at LFP – also available in French (archived))

== Coaching career ==
After retirement, Giunta started as coaching career working for the youth teams of Brescia, a former team of his as a player.

During the 2008–09 season, he then served as head coach of Serie D amateurs Suzzara. He successively started a collaboration with Eugenio Corini, working as his assistant at Portosummaga, Crotone and Frosinone.

In October 2013, Giunta took over from Alessio Tacchinardi as head coach of Lega Pro Seconda Divisione club Pergolettese, and was himself sacked in February 2014.

On 21 January 2015, he was appointed new head coach of Serie B club Brescia, taking over from caretaker Ivan Javorčić. He was sacked less than a month later on 18 February 2015 and replaced by Alessandro Calori.
