= Alfredo Aglietti =

Italian footballer and manager (born 1970)

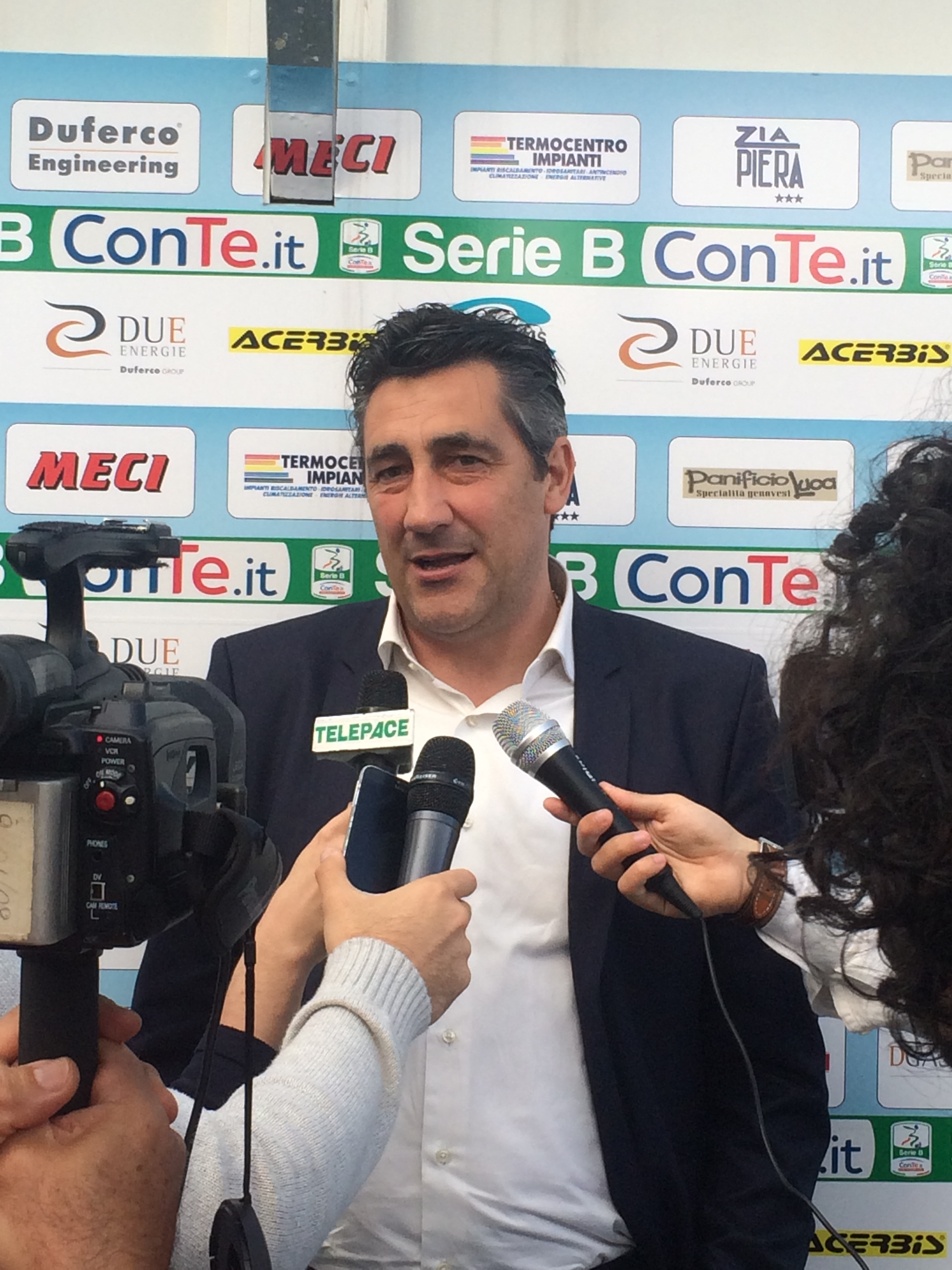
- Alfredo Aglietti in 2015

Personal information
- Full name: Alfredo Aglietti
- Date of birth: 16 September 1970 (age 56)
- Place of birth: San Giovanni Valdarno, Italy
- Position: Striker

Senior career*
Years	Team	Apps	(Gls)
1990–1991	Montevarchi Aquila	19	(2)
1991–1993	Rondinella Firenze	63	(23)
1993–1994	Pontedera	34	(22)
1994–1996	Reggina	69	(38)
1996–1997	Napoli	28	(8)
1997–2000	Hellas Verona	73	(18)
2000	Chievo	10	(2)
2000–2001	Pistoiese	18	(3)
2001–2003	Arezzo	28	(2)
2003	Milazzo	3	(1)
2003	Villacidrese	19	(11)

Managerial career
- 2004–2005: Rondinella
- 2005–2006: Sestese
- 2006–2009: Viareggio
- 2010–2011: Empoli
- 2012: Empoli
- 2012–2013: Novara
- 2014: Novara
- 2015–2016: Virtus Entella
- 2016–2017: Ascoli
- 2017–2018: Virtus Entella
- 2019: Hellas Verona
- 2020–2021: Chievo
- 2021: Reggina
- 2022–2023: Brescia
- 2024: Lecco
- * Club domestic league appearances and goals

Alfredo Aglietti (born 16 September 1970) is an Italian football manager and a former player who played as a striker.

== Playing career ==
Aglietti started his career at amateur club Rondinella before a stint at Pontedera saw him land in Reggina by 1994, playing in Serie C1 at the time. After providing a valuable goalscoring effort at the lower level of the Italian football pyramid, Aglietti quickly adapted to his new surroundings. Following promotion and a successful season in Serie B as the follow-up, he caught the eyes of the prestigious Serie A club Napoli, where he was involved in taking the club to the Coppa Italia final of 1997, and becoming the club top scorer in the league season, netting eight league goals.

Following Napoli's purchases of Igor Protti and Claudio Bellucci, Aglietti was sold to Hellas Verona, where he spent three seasons, scoring 18 league goals for the club in 73 appearances. He then played for their local rivals Chievo before going to Arezzo, where he finished his professional career.

== Coaching career ==
After making some playing appearances for amateur clubs, Aglietti switched to a coaching career, starting with a number of youth teams before taking charge at Empoli in 2010. On 2 October 2011, he was sacked and replaced by Giuseppe Pillon. On 12 February 2012, he was recalled by the same team as head coach until the end of the season.

On 18 November 2012 he was named new coach of Novara in Serie B.

He successively served as head coach of Virtus Entella (Serie B) in 2015–16 and Ascoli (Serie B) during the 2016–17 season.

In November 2017, he made a comeback in charge of Virtus Entella. He was sacked from Virtus Entella on 7 May 2018, with the team in the relegation zone with two games to go.

On 2 May 2019, he was named to replace Fabio Grosso at the helm of Serie B club Hellas Verona to help the club get into the promotion playoffs. Under his short tenure, he managed to guide the club to fifth place in the regular season, and then to the promotion playoff finals, where Verona defeated Cittadella to achieve promotion to Serie A after only a single season in the second division. Despite his successes, however, Aglietti was not confirmed for another season, and Ivan Jurić was named as his replacement in charge of the club a few days later.

On 1 March 2020, he was signed by Serie B club Chievo. After guiding Chievo to the 2020–21 Serie B promotion playoffs, he left the Gialloblu to accept an offer from Serie B club Reggina, effective from 1 July 2021. On 13 December 2021, he was fired by Reggina following five consecutive losses.

On 21 December 2022, Aglietti was appointed new head coach of Serie B club Brescia. He was however sacked on 16 January 2023, after just two games in charge, with his predecessor Pep Clotet being reinstated as head coach.

On 12 February 2024, Aglietti signed for bottom-placed Serie B club Lecco. He was sacked on 3 April 2024, after failing to change the team's fortunes.

== Managerial statistics ==
As of match played 15 January 2023

Managerial record by team and tenure
Team	Nat	From	To	Record							
Team	Nat	From	To	G	W	D	L	GF	GA	GD	Win %
Rondinella	(Italy)	2 June 2004	6 June 2005	50	18	12	20	56	61	−5	36.00
Sestese	(Italy)	7 June 2005	10 May 2006	38	11	14	13	31	42	−11	28.95
Viareggio	(Italy)	10 May 2006	9 June 2009	128	59	40	29	162	120	+42	46.09
Empoli	(Italy)	6 June 2010	2 October 2011	53	18	18	17	68	60	+8	33.96
Empoli	(Italy)	12 February 2012	17 June 2012	18	7	7	4	20	17	+3	38.89
Novara	(Italy)	18 November 2012	18 November 2013	45	19	13	13	75	56	+19	42.22
Novara	(Italy)	16 February 2014	7 June 2014	18	5	5	8	18	26	−8	27.78
Virtus Entella	(Italy)	12 April 2015	26 May 2016	52	18	19	15	58	52	+6	34.62
Ascoli	(Italy)	16 June 2016	1 June 2017	43	10	20	13	46	51	−5	23.26
Virtus Entella	(Italy)	6 November 2017	6 May 2018	27	6	9	12	22	31	−9	22.22
Hellas Verona	(Italy)	2 May 2019	14 June 2019	7	4	1	2	10	7	+3	57.14
Chievo	(Italy)	1 March 2020	31 May 2021	55	20	20	15	74	57	+17	36.36
Reggina	(Italy)	31 May 2021	13 December 2021	18	6	4	8	15	25	−10	33.33
Brescia	(Italy)	21 December 2022	16 January 2023	2	0	1	1	1	2	−1	0.00
Lecco	(Italy)	12 February 2024	3 April 2024	0	0	0	0	0	0	+0	—
Career total				554	201	183	170	656	607	+49	36.28
