= ASD Paternò Calcio =

Italian association football club

Paternò
- Full name: Associazione Sportiva Dilettantistica Paternò Calcio
- Nicknames: Etnei (Etneans), Rosso-azzurri (Red and light-blues)
- Founded: 1957; 1991 (refounded); 2004 (refounded); 2011 (refounded); 2012 (refounded); 2017 (refounded)
- Ground: Stadio Falcone e Borsellino, Paternò, Italy
- Capacity: 4,000
- Chairman: Ivan Mazzamuto
- Manager: Filippo Raciti
- League: Serie D Group I
- 2024–25: Serie D Group I, 7th of 18
- Website: https://www.paternocalcio.eu/
Home colours	Away colours

Associazione Sportiva Dilettantistica Paternò Calcio is an Italian association football club located in Paternò, Sicily.

It currently plays in Serie D Group I.

== History ==
=== From Pol. Paternò to A.S.D. Paternò 2011 ===
The first football team in Paternò is generally believed to have been established in 1908. Following World War II, several teams were founded in the city, including Polisportiva Paternò, which managed to reach Serie D in 1961/1962. Following the promotion, Paternò attempted to win the league and advance to Serie C over the following years, fielding talented players such as Gaetano Troja, the young striker who played Serie A with Palermo, and goalkeeper Marcello Trevisan, who would later play for Napoli. In the 1965–66 season, Paternò was on the verge of being promoted, as the team placed first with a one-point lead over Massiminiana of Catania. Still, a defeat in the season's final match left the team short as Massimiana overtook them at the top of the table and advanced to Serie C. In 1976–77, Paternò was relegated to Promozione but quickly returned to Serie D the following year. The last and final promotion for Polisportiva Paternò came in 1985/1986; the old club would not get another opportunity to play in Serie D before its demise in 1989/1990. The following year, a new club, named Associazione Sportiva Paternò Calcio, was founded and managed to reach Eccellenza in 1993/1994.

Paternò would return to play Serie D in 2000–01, following triumph in the 1999–2000 Eastern Sicilian Eccellenza round. The Serie D season started with a new coach, Pasquale Marino, and no particular expectations to win the league. The surprising season concluded with a league win that secured Paternò's promotion to Serie C2 for the first time. Paternò's first Serie C2 campaign was even more astounding, as the rossoblu ended the regular season in third place and successively defeated S.S.C. Giugliano in the playoff semi-finals and Foggia in the finals, thereby gaining a third consecutive promotion. The ensuing 2002–03 Serie C1 campaign was, however, not as successful, as Paternò ultimately was defeated by L'Aquila in the relegation playoffs; however, the team was admitted back to Serie C1 due to league vacancies.

The 2003–2004 season, with Maurizio Pellegrino as coach, ended in a lacklustre relegation for the club after the playoffs to Vis Pesaro. It would be the last for the club, which declared bankruptcy in the summer. The new club, with the current denomination, was admitted to play Promozione and reached Serie D in 2006. They were, however, relegated back to Eccellenza in 2008 after losing in the playoffs.

In the summer of 2011, it was renamed A.S.D. Paternò 2011.

In the summer of 2012, the club acquired the sports title of Serie D club Adrano, based in Adrano and was renamed Polisportiva Dilettantistica Comprensorio Normanno.

In the summer of 2013, the club was unable to enter 2013–14 Serie D and restarted from Promozione. In the summer of 2014, the club changed its denomination to A.S.D. Paternò 1908.

In May 2024, Paternò won the Coppa Italia Dilettanti after defeating Solbiatese in the final.

== Colors and badge ==
The team colours are red and light blue.

== Notable former managers ==
- (Italy) Pasquale Marino
