= Roberto Breda =

Italian football coach and former player

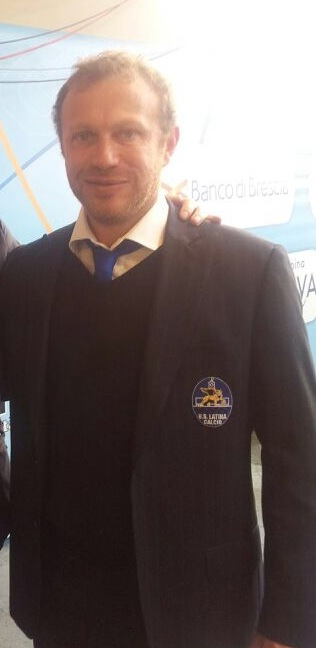

Personal information
- Date of birth: 21 October 1969 (age 57)
- Place of birth: Treviso, Italy
- Height: 1.75 m (5 ft 9 in)
- Position: Midfielder

Senior career*
Years	Team	Apps	(Gls)
1986–1987	Ospitaletto	3	(0)
1987–1990	Sampdoria	1	(0)
1990–1991	Messina	24	(1)
1991	Udinese	0	(0)
1991–1992	Messina	15	(1)
1992–1993	SPAL	19	(0)
1993	Sampdoria	0	(0)
1993–1999	Salernitana	192	(10)
1999–2000	Parma	16	(0)
2000–2002	Genoa	19	(0)
2002	Catania	18	(0)
2002–2003	Genoa	18	(2)
2003–2005	Salernitana	38	(0)
Total		363	(14)

International career
1991–1992	Italy U21	3	(0)

Managerial career
- 2010: Reggina
- 2010–2011: Salernitana
- 2011–2012: Reggina
- 2012: Reggina
- 2012–2013: Vicenza
- 2013–2014: Latina
- 2014–2015: Latina
- 2015–2016: Ternana
- 2016–2017: Virtus Entella
- 2017–2018: Perugia
- 2018–2019: Livorno
- 2020: Livorno
- 2020–2021: Pescara
- 2023: Ascoli
- 2023–2024: Ternana
- 2025: Salernitana
- 2026: Padova
- * Club domestic league appearances and goals

Roberto Breda (born 21 October 1969) is an Italian football coach and former player.

== Playing career ==
A midfielder, Breda made his Serie A debut with Sampdoria and later played with several other teams ranging from the top flight to Serie C clubs, most notably spending two long stints at Salernitana, being also a key member of the team who played a Serie A season during his first period at the club.

== Coaching career ==
Breda served as head youth coach for the Reggina Primavera from 2007 to 2010, Breda was promoted as head coach of Reggina on 8 February 2010 after the dismissal of Ivo Iaconi. Breda's first game as head coach of Reggina was on home turf against Mantova (3–1) on 13 February. He guided the team to safety after a troublesome start of season. Still, he was not confirmed as head coach and left Reggina in June 2010.

Later, in July 2010, he was appointed the new boss of his former club Salernitana. He guided his club to third place in the regular season but then lost the promotion playoff finals to Verona in a 2–1 aggregate win for the Venetians.

He then left Salernitana at the end of the 2010–11 season to return to Reggina, replacing Gianluca Atzori at the helm of the Calabrians for the club's 2011–12 Serie B campaign. On 8 January 2012 he was stripped from his managerial duties allegedly due to poor results, being however appointed back at the helm of the club just three months later, on 15 April, in place for Angelo Gregucci until the end of the season.

In the summer of 2012, he was appointed head coach of Vicenza for the team's Serie B campaign, only to be sacked later in January 2013 due to poor results. He returned to management in September 2013, succeeding to Gaetano Auteri at newly promoted Serie B outsiders Latina and guiding them to a surprise league run that led the club to end the season in third place, only to be defeated by Cesena in the Serie A promotion playoff finals. After missing on top-flight promotion, Breda decided to leave Latina, only to return at the helm of the club later in October 2014 in place for Mario Beretta. However, his second stint at Latina turned out to be largely unsuccessful and ended with him being dismissed on 5 January 2015, leaving the club in 21st place.

On 7 November 2018, he was named new head coach of last-placed Serie B club Livorno. On 9 December 2019, he was dismissed by Livorno following a string of poor results, including seven losses in previous ten games and 1 point in previous four games. On 3 February 2020, he was reappointed as head coach of Livorno. He was however sacked for a second time only one month later, on 8 March 2020.

On 29 November 2020, he was hired by Serie B club Pescara. He was sacked on 14 February 2021 after a 2–0 home loss to Venezia that left Pescara bottom of the league.

Breda returned to management on 6 February 2023 as the new head coach of Serie B side Ascoli, taking over from Cristian Bucchi. He left the club by the end of the season after guiding Ascoli to safety.

On 6 November 2023, Breda took over at Ternana, being appointed as the club's new head coach in place of outgoing Cristiano Lucarelli.

On 3 January 2025, Breda returned to Salernitana, replacing Stefano Colantuono; his second stint in charge of the club, however, turned out to be disappointing, as he was dismissed just three months later, on 7 April 2025, leaving Salernitana deep in the Serie B relegation zone.

On 23 March 2026, Breda was hired as the new head coach of Serie B club Padova until the end of the season. He was let go by Padova as his contract expired in June 2026.

== Managerial statistics ==
As of match played 23 May 2024

Managerial record by team and tenure
Team	Nat	From	To	Record							
Team	Nat	From	To	G	W	D	L	GF	GA	GD	Win %
Reggina	(Italy)	8 February 2010	16 June 2010	18	8	4	6	23	19	+4	44.44
Salernitana	(Italy)	17 July 2010	23 June 2011	40	19	9	12	55	47	+8	47.50
Reggina	(Italy)	23 June 2011	8 January 2012	23	9	7	7	36	26	+10	39.13
Reggina	(Italy)	15 April 2012	2 July 2012	8	2	1	5	10	15	−5	25.00
Vicenza	(Italy)	14 July 2012	28 January 2013	26	5	10	11	36	40	−4	19.23
Latina	(Italy)	12 September 2013	23 June 2014	43	18	15	10	48	37	+11	41.86
Latina	(Italy)	6 October 2014	4 January 2015	14	2	7	5	10	15	−5	14.29
Ternana	(Italy)	28 September 2015	10 June 2016	37	15	7	15	46	46	+0	40.54
Virtus Entella	(Italy)	10 June 2016	30 April 2017	41	13	15	13	51	49	+2	31.71
Perugia	(Italy)	26 October 2017	12 May 2018	31	12	11	8	50	43	+7	38.71
Livorno	(Italy)	7 November 2018	9 December 2019	42	11	12	19	42	55	−13	26.19
Livorno	(Italy)	3 February 2020	8 March 2020	6	1	2	3	5	9	−4	16.67
Pescara	(Italy)	29 November 2020	14 February 2021	14	3	4	7	12	22	−10	21.43
Ascoli	(Italy)	6 February 2023	19 June 2023	15	6	3	6	14	17	−3	40.00
Ternana	(Italy)	6 November 2023	21 June 2024	28	10	8	10	34	38	−4	35.71
Total				386	134	115	137	472	478	−6	34.72

== Honours ==
Sampdoria:

- Coppa Italia: 1987–88, 1988–89
- UEFA Cup Winners' Cup: 1989–90

Parma

- Supercoppa Italiana: 1999

Salernitana

- Serie B: 1997–98
