= New Generation Mobile =

Italian mobile phone manufacturer

NGM Italia S.r.l.
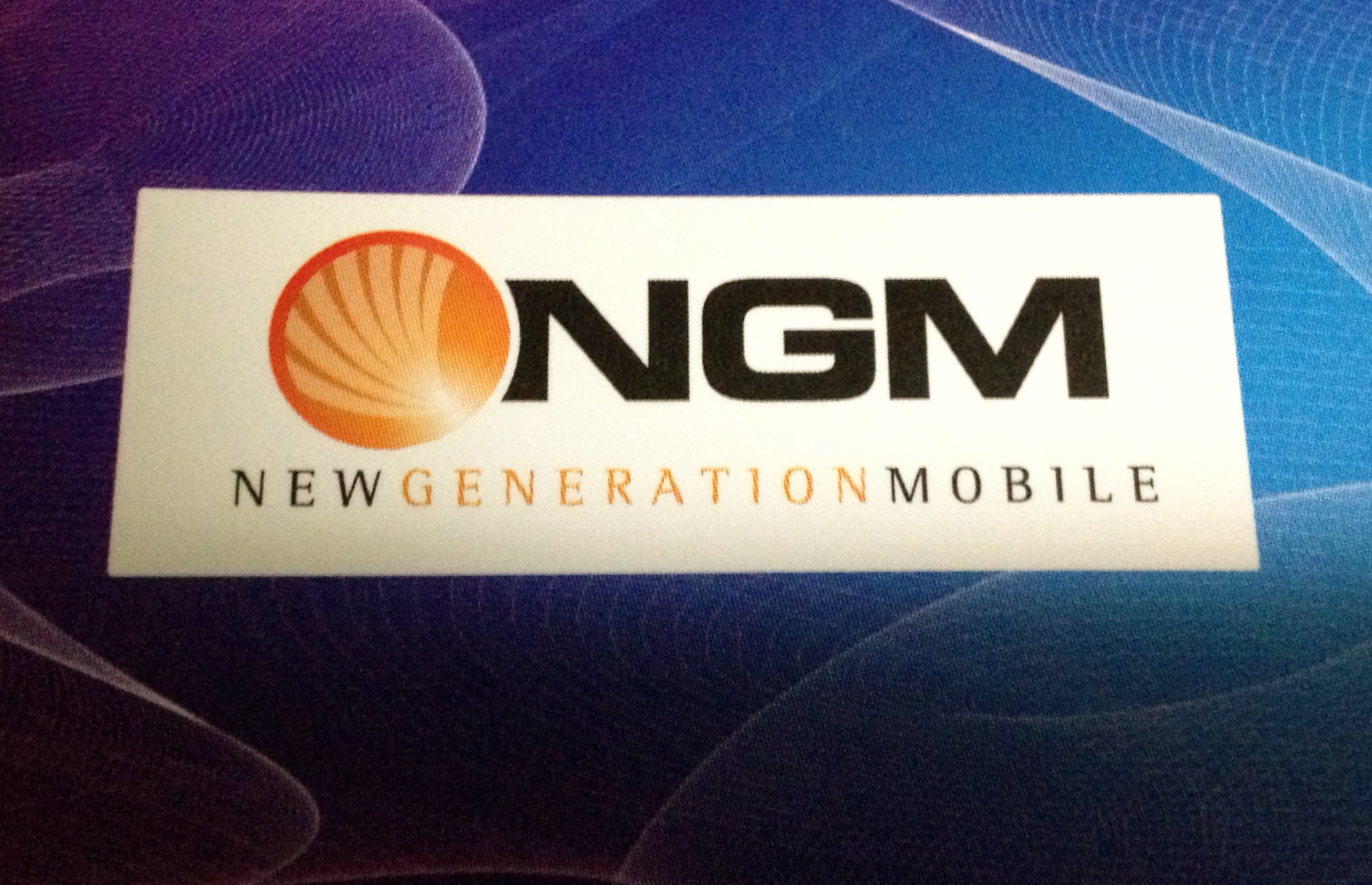

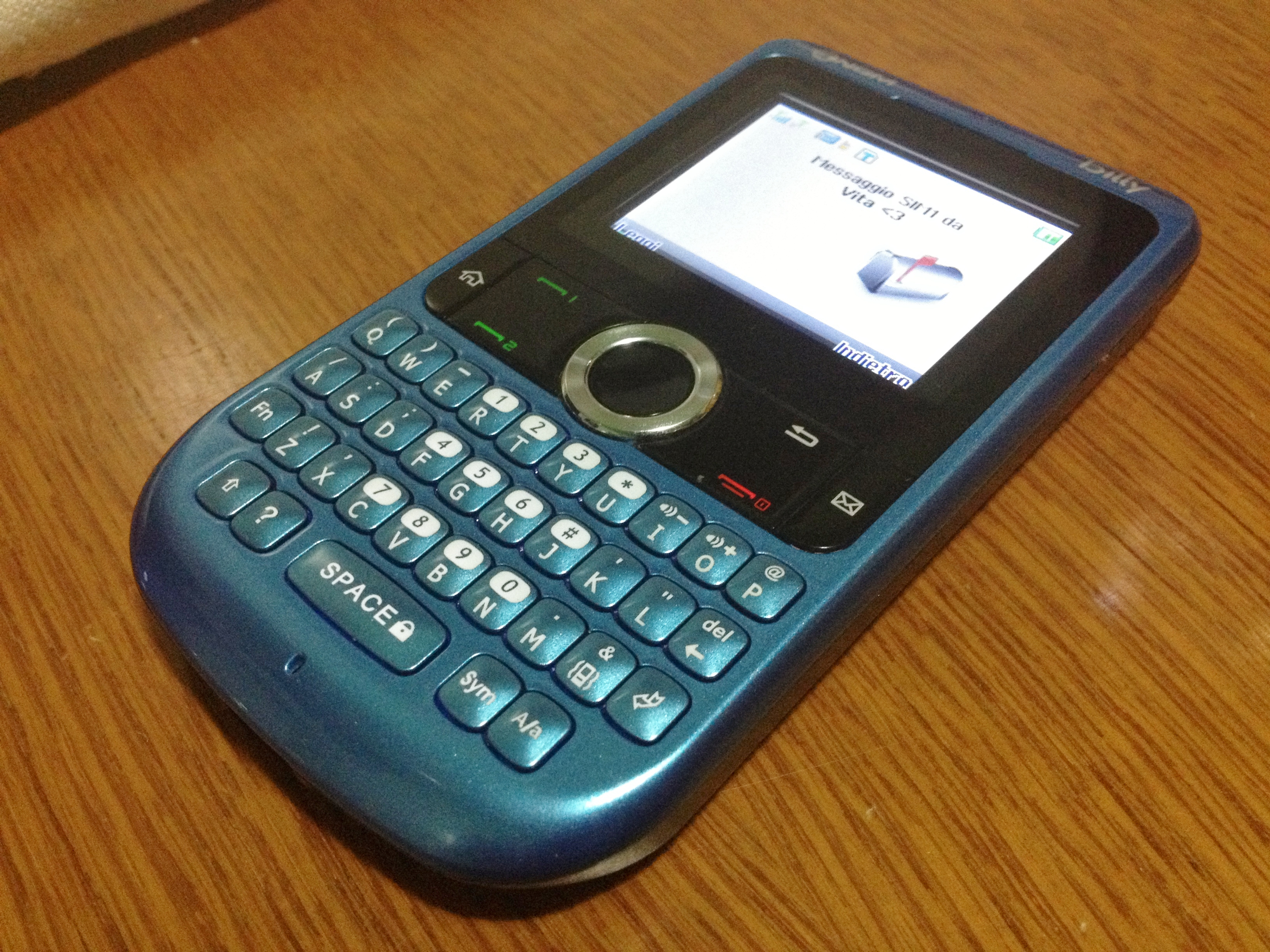
- NGM Billy
- Type: Private
- Industry: Electronics; Mobile phone
- Founded: 2003; 23 years ago
- Founders: Stefano Nesi; Sergio Pancanti
- Headquarters: Santa Maria a Monte, Italy
- Area served: Western Europe; Latin America
- Key people: Stefano Nesi (chairman)
- Products: Mobile phones; Television sets; Smartwatches
- Website: www.ngm.eu

New Generation Mobile, commonly known by the acronym NGM, is an Italian electronics manufacturer.

Founded in 2003 by Stefano Nesi and Sergio Pancanti, its products include smartphones, television sets and smartwatches.

== Sponsorship ==
NGM sponsors the football clubs Bologna F.C. 1909, and Empoli F.C.; during the 2013-2014 season it was main sponsor of the Serie B league. Its logo appeared on the jerseys of all players.
