= Giuseppe Sannino =

Italian football manager (born 1957)

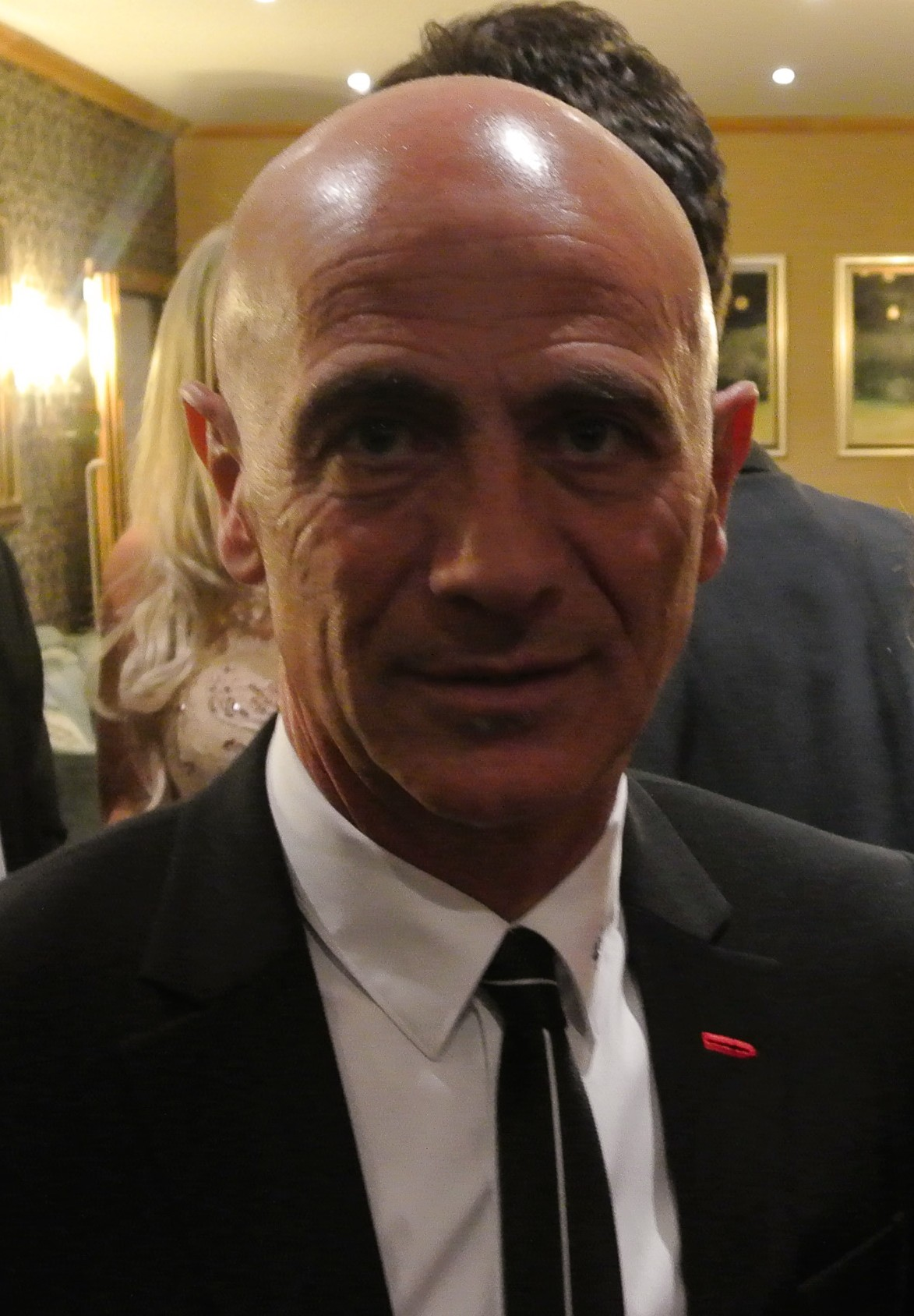
- Sannino in 2014

Personal information
- Date of birth: 30 April 1957 (age 69)
- Place of birth: Ottaviano, Italy
- Position: Midfielder

Senior career*
Years	Team	Apps	(Gls)
1975–1976	Varese	0	(0)
1976–1977	Milanese 1920		
1977–1979	Trento	51	(6)
1979–1982	Vogherese	65	(18)
1982–1984	Fanfulla	64	(6)
1984	Pavia	0	(0)
1984–1985	Spezia	24	(1)
1985–1986	Vogherese	34	(0)
1986–1987	Vigevano		
1987–1988	Entella	28	(2)

Managerial career
- 1996–1997: Oltrepò
- 1998–1999: Biellese
- 1999–2001: Südtirol
- 2001–2002: Meda
- 2002–2003: Sangiovannese
- 2003–2004: Varese
- 2004: Cosenza
- 2005–2007: Lecco
- 2007–2008: Pergocrema
- 2008–2011: Varese
- 2011–2012: Siena
- 2012: Palermo
- 2013: Palermo
- 2013: Chievo Verona
- 2013–2014: Watford
- 2014: Catania
- 2015: Carpi
- 2016: Salernitana
- 2017–2018: Triestina
- 2018–2019: Levadiakos
- 2019: Novara
- 2019–2020: Budapest Honvéd
- 2021: Levadiakos
- 2021–2022: Al-Ittihad
- 2022: Nocerina
- 2022–2024: FC Paradiso
- 2025: AC Bellinzona
- 2025: Al Ahly
- 2025–2026: AC Bellinzona
- * Club domestic league appearances and goals

Giuseppe "Beppe" Sannino (born 30 April 1957) is an Italian professional football manager and former player.

== Playing career ==
Born in Campania, Sannino relocated to Turin with his family after his father was hired by the Fiat automobile company in Turin. In his career, Sannino played as a creative attacking midfielder for several minor league teams, with Serie C2 club Vogherese being the one he became most associated with. Sannino retired from active football in 1988, after a lone season with Ligurian amateur club Entella.

== Coaching career ==
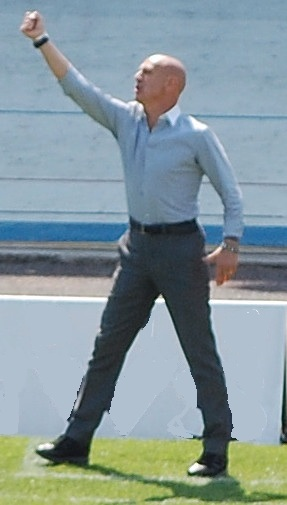
Sannino managing Varese in 2010

=== Lower leagues in Italy ===
Sannino entered into a coaching career in 1990, as responsible of the Allievi (under-17) team at Vogherese. In 1992, he became youth coach at Pavia, and one year later he worked with the same role at Monza. In 1996, he took his first head coaching experience at amateur Eccellenza club Oltrepò, ending the season in sixth place. After a short stint as youth coach at Como, in 1998 Sannino took his first head coaching role in a professional league at Serie C2 club Biellese: this experience however turned out to be disappointing, as he was dismissed before the end of the season.

In 1999, he took charge of Serie D club Südtirol, leading them to first place in the league, and then keeping the club in Serie C2 the following season. In 2001–02, he managed Meda, another Serie C2 club, but was dismissed again before the end of the season. In 2002–03, he then led Sangiovannese to sixth place in Serie C2. Two other unsuccessful stints followed with Varese and Cosenza, but both ended with him being fired.

In 2005, he took the reins of Lecco, guiding the Lombardian team to a surprise promotion to Serie C1 in his second season in charge of the club. This was followed by three more consecutive promotions: the first at Pergocrema (from Serie C2 to Serie C1), and the other two at Varese, where he was appointed by Sean Sogliano during the season and successfully guided the club from Serie C2 to Serie B. In his first season in Serie B, Sannino led Varese to a remarkable fourth place and a spot in the promotion playoffs, but lost to Padova in the semi-finals.

=== Serie A and moving abroad ===
In June 2011, Sannino signed a two-year contract as head coach of newly promoted Serie A club Siena, taking over from departing boss Antonio Conte, who was signed by Italian giants Juventus. The aim for the Tuscan club was to escape relegation in what was going to be Sannino's first experience in charge of a top flight club. In the 2011–12 season, Sannino managed to keep Siena safely out of the relegation zone, and also led the club to the Coppa Italia semi-finals, then lost to eventual winners Napoli.

On 6 June 2012, Sannino signed a two-year contract as head coach of Palermo, only a few weeks after Siena director of football Giorgio Perinetti made the same move to Sicily. His short-lived experience with the Sicilians ended on 16 September 2012, when club chairman Maurizio Zamparini decided to remove him from first team duties after achieving only one point in the first three Serie A games; he was replaced by Gian Piero Gasperini. He was rehired on 11 March 2013. Despite an impressive string of results with a particularly difficult calendar (including wins against Inter and Roma), however, he failed to keep Palermo in the top flight.

He was appointed as Chievo coach on 1 July. However, he was sacked on 11 November.

On 18 December 2013, he was confirmed as new head coach of Watford. On 15 March 2014, Sannino led Watford to a club record sixth consecutive home win in all competitions without conceding, with a 3–0 win against Barnsley. Despite winning four of the first five league games of the 2014–15 season, and with Watford second in the table, his future was subject to speculation following rumours of dressing-room unrest and some players disliking his management style. Sannino resigned on 31 August, his last game in charge being their 4–2 home win against Huddersfield Town the day before.

=== Later career ===
On 14 September 2014, Sannino returned into management, taking over as new head coach of Serie B club Catania. His period as Catania boss, however, lasted only three months, as he resigned on 19 December following a string a poor results and strained relationship with the club's board. On 29 September 2015, he was appointed manager of newly promoted Serie A side Carpi. On 3 November, it was announced that he had been relieved of his duties and he was replaced by Fabrizio Castori - the man he had initially replaced - as first team coach

He was subsequently appointed new head coach of Serie B club Salernitana for the 2016–17 season, but resigned from his position on 30 November 2016 after having criticised the attitude of the club's supporters following a league home draw to Pro Vercelli. Sannino then served as head coach of Triestina for the club's 2017–18 Serie C campaign, a job he left in February 2018 due to disagreements with the board, with his assistant Nicola Princivalli taking over from him.

On 22 October 2018, he was named new head coach of Super League Greece club Levadiakos. On 19 February 2019, he was named new head coach of Serie C club Novara. On 5 May 2019, he was sacked. On 28 May, Sannino was named new head coach of Nemzeti Bajnokság I club Budapest Honvéd. He resigned in March 2020, following the COVID-19 pandemic, in order to move back to Italy. In February 2021, Sannino returned to manage Levadiakos; however, he resigned less than three months later on 11 May for personal reasons, despite having obtained 30 points in 15 league games.

Sannino subsequently served as head coach of Libyan Premier League club Al-Ittihad from September 2021 to January 2022.

He then joined Serie D club Nocerina for in the 2022–23 season, leaving the club on 3 October 2022. The same day, he was unveiled as the new head coach of Swiss 1. Liga (fourth tier) club FC Paradiso. He led Paradiso to promotion to the Swiss Promotion League that season and recorded a top four finish in the next season. He left Paradiso on 29 September 2024 due to family reasons.

On 20 March 2025, he joined Swiss Challenge League side AC Bellinzona. After departing Bellinzona by the end of the season, Sannino took over in August 2025 as the new head coach of Libyan Premier League side Al Ahly. He returned to Bellinzona on 24 October 2025, taking over the side sitting in last place with just four points in the first ten games of the 2025–26 season.
