= 2015–16 Lega Pro =

Lega Pro
- Season: 2015–16
- Champions: Cittadella (Group A); SPAL (Group B); Benevento (Group C); Pisa (playoffs)

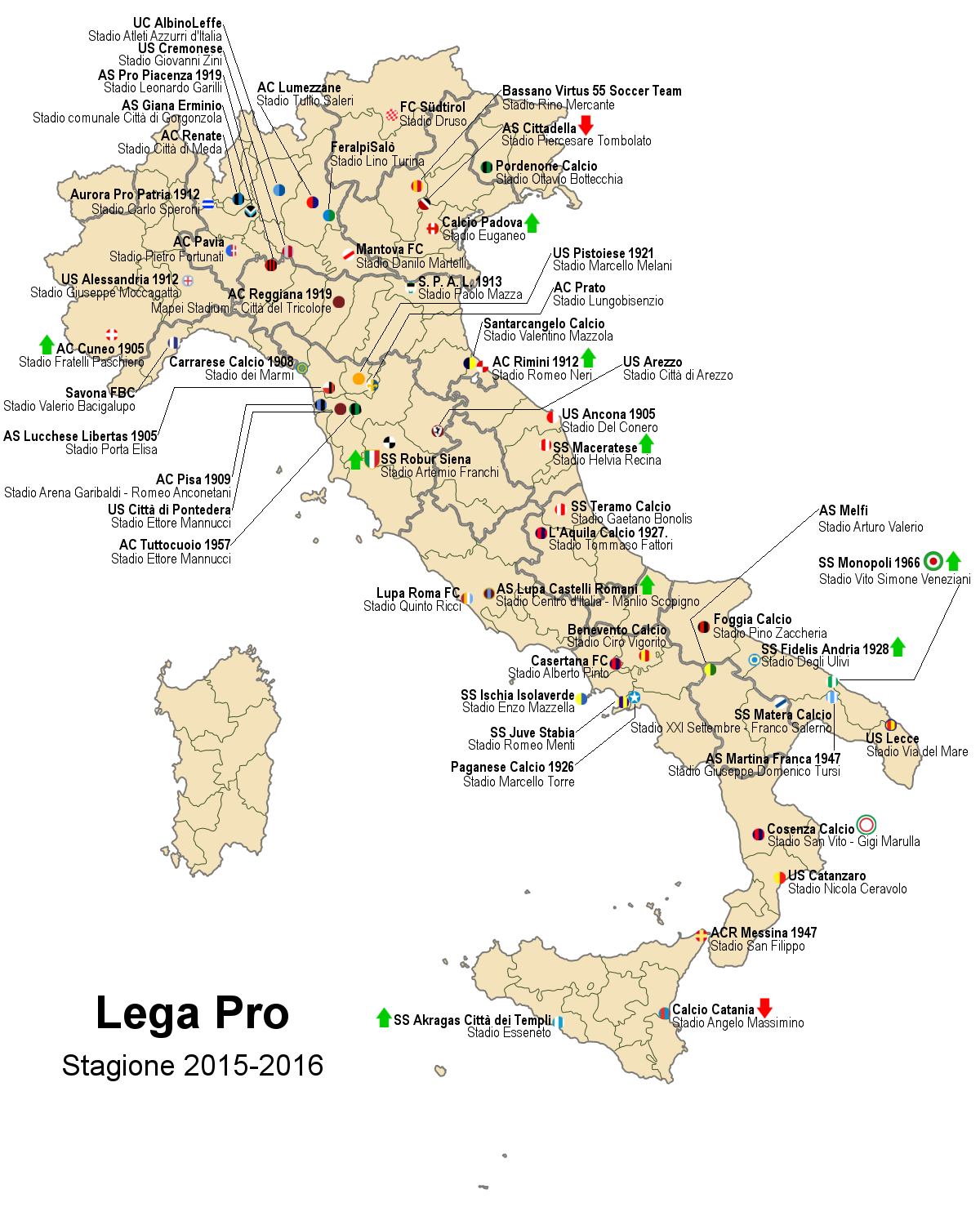

The 2015–16 Lega Pro Divisione Unica is the second season of the unified Lega Pro division. The championship name, which is Divisione Unica according to the FIGC regulations, is called Lega Pro in official documents.

== Teams ==
A total of 54 teams will contest the league. Clubs will include 2 sides relegated from the 2014–15 Serie B season, 43 sides playing the 2014–15 Lega Pro season, and 9 sides promoted from the 2014–15 Serie D season.

On 1 July 2015 60 teams mathematically qualified to the new season. However, Barletta (bankruptcy), Grosseto (bankruptcy), Monza (bankruptcy) and Castiglione did not submit their application for a license. New companies from Grosseto and Monza applied for Serie D, and Barletta for Eccellenza while Castiglione plays in youth football only. Moreover, 12 teams failed the initial financial stress test of FIGC. On 17 July Reggina Calcio, A.S. Varese 1910, F.B.C. Unione Venezia, Real Vicenza and Paganese Calcio 1926 were officially excluded; new companies from Reggio Calabria, Varese and Venezia were admitted to Serie D and Eccellenza respectively, while Real Vicenza was focused on youth football. On 31 July Paganese won the appeal. The exclusion left Lega Pro 8 teams short as well as 1 team short in Serie B due to bankruptcy of Parma. FIGC decided that Brescia replaced Parma in Serie B as well as readmission of AlbinoLeffe and Pordenone to Lega Pro on 4 August. On 20 August Catania and Teramo were relegated to Lega Pro due to another chapter of betting scandal, while Savona was relegated to Serie D; Ascoli and Virtus Entella were promoted to replace the vacancies, subject to the appeals. Moreover, the Federal Council also reduced the league from 60 teams to 54 teams, making there was 2 vacancies left on 25 August. On 29 August Savona won the appeal to remain in the professional league; Torres and Vigor Lamezia were relegated, despite both FIGC, Catania and Teramo were still able to appeal in CONI. On 1 September Pro Patria and Messina were readmitted, while the last team promoted from Serie D was Monopoli.

Group A, North

- AlbinoLeffe, from Girone A
- Alessandria, from Girone A
- Bassano Virtus, from Girone A
- Cittadella, from Serie B
- Cremonese, from Girone A
- Cuneo, from Serie D, Group A
- FeralpiSalò, from Girone A
- Giana Erminio, from Girone A
- Lumezzane, from Girone A
- Mantova, from Girone A
- Padova, from Serie D, Group C
- Pavia, from Girone A
- Pordenone, from Girone A
- Pro Patria, from Girone A
- Pro Piacenza, from Girone B
- Reggiana, from Girone B
- Renate, from Girone A
- Südtirol, from Girone A

Group B, Central

- Ancona, from Girone B
- Arezzo, from Girone A
- Carrarese, from Girone B
- L'Aquila, from Girone B
- Lucchese, from Girone B
- Lupa Roma, from Girone C
- Maceratese, from Serie D, Group F
- Pisa, from Girone B
- Pistoiese, from Girone B
- Pontedera, from Girone B
- Prato, from Girone B
- Rimini, from Serie D, Group D
- Santarcangelo, from Girone B
- Savona, from Girone B
- Siena, from Serie D, Group E
- SPAL, from Girone B
- Teramo, from Girone B
- Tuttocuoio, from Girone B

Group C, South

- Akragas, from Serie D, Group I
- Benevento, from Girone C
- Casertana, from Girone C
- Catania, from Serie B
- Catanzaro, from Girone C
- Cosenza, from Girone C
- Fidelis Andria, from Serie D, Group H
- Foggia, from Girone C
- Ischia, from Girone C
- Juve Stabia, from Girone C
- Lecce, from Girone C
- Lupa Castelli Romani, from Serie D, Group G
- Martina Franca, from Girone C
- Matera, from Girone C
- Melfi, from Girone C
- Messina, from Girone C
- Monopoli, from Serie D, Group H
- Paganese, from Girone C

=== Stadia and locations ===
Note: Table lists in alphabetical order.

==== Group A (North) ====
Location of teams in Lega Pro (Group A) 2015–16
Location of teams in 2015–16 Lega Pro (Group A) (Lombardy)

Club	City	Stadium	Capacity
AlbinoLeffe	Albino and Leffe (playing in Bergamo)	Atleti Azzurri d'Italia	26,542
Alessandria	Alessandria	Giuseppe Moccagatta	5,827
Bassano Virtus	Bassano del Grappa	Rino Mercante	2,952
Cremonese	Cremona	Giovanni Zini	20,641
Cittadella	Cittadella	Pier Cesare Tombolato	7,623
Cuneo	Cuneo	Fratelli Paschiero	4,060
FeralpiSalò	Salò	Lino Turina	2,000
Giana Erminio	Gorgonzola	Città di Gorgonzola	3,766
Lumezzane	Lumezzane	Nuovo Comunale	4,150
Mantova	Mantua	Danilo Martelli	14,884
Padova	Padua	Euganeo	19,740
Pavia	Pavia	Pietro Fortunati	4,999
Pordenone	Pordenone	Ottavio Bottecchia	3,000
Pro Patria	Busto Arsizio	Carlo Speroni	4,627
Pro Piacenza	Piacenza	Leonardo Garilli	21,668
Reggiana	Reggio Emilia	Città del Tricolore	20,084
Renate	Renate (playing in Meda)	Città di Meda	3,000
Südtirol	Bolzano	Druso	3,500

==== Group B (North and Central) ====
Location of teams in Lega Pro (Group B) 2015–16
Location of teams in 2015–16 Lega Pro (Group B) (Tuscany)

Club	City	Stadium	Capacity
Ancona	Ancona	del Conero	23,983
Arezzo	Arezzo	Città di Arezzo	13,128
Carrarese	Carrara	Dei Marmi	15,000
L'Aquila	L'Aquila	Stadio Tommaso Fattori	10,000
Lucchese	Lucca	Porta Elisa	7,386
Lupa Roma	Rome (playing in Aprilia)	Quinto Ricci	3,000
Maceratese	Macerata	Helvia Recina	5,846
Pisa	Pisa	Arena Garibaldi	14,869
Pistoiese	Pistoia	Marcello Melani	13,195
Pontedera	Pontedera	Ettore Mannucci	5,000
Prato	Prato	Lungobisenzio	6,800
Rimini	Rimini	Romeo Neri	9,768
Siena	Siena	Montepaschi Arena	15,373
Santarcangelo	Santarcangelo di Romagna	Valentino Mazzola	3,000
Savona	Savona	Valerio Bacigalupo	4,000
SPAL	Ferrara	Paolo Mazza	17,955
Teramo	Teramo	Gaetano Bonolis	7,498
Tuttocuoio	San Miniato (playing in Pontedera)	Ettore Mannucci	5,000

==== Group C (South) ====
Location of teams in Lega Pro (Group C) 2015–16
Location of teams in Lega Pro (Group C) 2015–16 (Campania)
Location of teams in Lega Pro (Group C) 2015–16 (Apulia)

Club	City	Stadium	Capacity
Akragas	Agrigento	Esseneto	15,000
Benevento	Benevento	Ciro Vigorito	12,847
Casertana	Caserta	Alberto Pinto	12,000
Catania	Catania	Angelo Massimino	20,266
Catanzaro	Catanzaro	Nicola Ceravolo	14,650
Cosenza	Cosenza	San Vito	24,479
Fidelis Andria	Andria	Degli Ulivi	9,140
Foggia	Foggia	Pino Zaccheria	25,000
Ischia	Ischia	Vincenzo Mazzella	5,000
Juve Stabia	Castellammare di Stabia	Romeo Menti	7,642
Lecce	Lecce	Via del Mare	33,876
Lupa Castelli Romani	Frascati	Centro d'Italia-Manlio Scopigno (Rieti)	4,500
Martina Franca	Martina Franca	Gian Domenico Tursi	4,900
Matera	Matera	Franco Salerno	8,500
Melfi	Melfi	Arturo Valerio	4,100
Messina	Messina	San Filippo	37,895
Monopoli	Monopoli	Vito Simone Veneziani	6,880
Paganese	Pagani	Marcello Torre	5,900

== League tables ==
=== Group A (North) ===
Pos	Team	Pld	W	D	L	GF	GA	GD	Pts	Promotion, qualification or relegation
1	Cittadella (C, P)	34	23	7	4	57	35	+22	76	Promotion to Serie B
2	Pordenone	34	19	8	7	52	30	+22	65	Qualification to the promotion play-offs
3	Bassano Virtus	34	17	11	6	45	31	+14	62	Qualification to the promotion play-offs
4	Alessandria	34	16	9	9	47	31	+16	57	Qualification to the promotion play-offs
5	Padova	34	14	12	8	46	30	+16	54	
6	Cremonese	34	14	11	9	40	33	+7	53	
7	Reggiana	34	13	13	8	40	25	+15	52	
8	Feralpisalò	34	14	8	12	50	43	+7	50	
9	Pavia (Note: Pavia was deducted 2 points.) (R)	34	14	9	11	48	36	+12	49	Relegation to Serie D
10	Südtirol	34	10	14	10	34	38	−4	44	
11	Renate	34	11	10	13	26	38	−12	43	
12	Giana Erminio	34	10	12	12	33	36	−3	42	
13	Lumezzane	34	12	6	16	37	42	−5	42	
14	Pro Piacenza (O)	34	8	15	11	30	35	−5	39	Qualification to the relegation play-offs
15	Mantova (O)	34	7	13	14	27	39	−12	34	Qualification to the relegation play-offs
16	Cuneo (R)	34	9	7	18	31	41	−10	34	Qualification to the relegation play-offs
17	AlbinoLeffe	34	4	8	22	23	57	−34	20	Qualification to the relegation play-offs
18	Pro Patria (Note: Pro Patria was deducted 3 points due to match fixing.) (R)	34	1	7	26	15	61	−46	7	Relegation to Serie D

Source: Lega Pro
(C) Champions; (O) Play-off winners; (P) Promoted; (R) Relegated

=== Group B (North and Central) ===
Pos	Team	Pld	W	D	L	GF	GA	GD	Pts	Promotion, qualification or relegation
1	SPAL (C, P)	34	21	8	5	59	25	+34	71	Promotion to Serie B
2	Pisa (Note: Pisa was deducted one point for administrative irregularities.) (O, P)	34	17	12	5	42	26	+16	62	Qualification to the promotion play-offs
3	Maceratese	34	15	13	6	47	31	+16	58	Qualification to the promotion play-offs
4	Ancona	34	14	11	9	34	29	+5	53	
5	Carrarese	34	13	12	9	49	37	+12	51	
6	Siena	34	11	13	10	34	38	−4	46	
7	Pontedera	34	11	12	11	43	38	+5	45	
8	Teramo (Note: Teramo was deducted 3 points for involvement in match fixing.)	34	11	13	10	42	40	+2	43	
9	Arezzo	34	8	18	8	33	32	+1	42	
10	Tuttocuoio	34	10	10	14	27	34	−7	40	
11	Santarcangelo (Note: Santarcangelo was deducted 6 points.)	34	11	12	11	41	38	+3	39	
12	Pistoiese	34	9	12	13	29	35	−6	39	
13	Lucchese	34	10	9	15	39	43	−4	39	
14	Prato (O)	34	9	10	15	32	43	−11	37	Qualification to the relegation play-offs
15	Rimini (Note: Rimini was deducted 2 points.) (R)	34	9	11	14	29	39	−10	36	Relegation to Serie D
16	L'Aquila (Note: L'Aquila was deducted 7 points for involvement in match fixing.) (R)	34	10	10	14	34	41	−7	33	Qualification to the relegation play-offs
17	Lupa Roma	34	6	9	19	27	55	−28	27	Qualification to the relegation play-offs
18	Savona (Note: Savona was deducted 6 points for involvement in match fixing and later of an additional 6 points for financial reasons.) (R)	34	9	9	16	27	44	−17	22	Relegation to Serie D

Source: Lega Pro
(C) Champions; (O) Play-off winners; (P) Promoted; (R) Relegated

=== Group C (South) ===
Pos	Team	Pld	W	D	L	GF	GA	GD	Pts	Promotion, qualification or relegation
1	Benevento (Note: Benevento was deducted one point.) (C, P)	34	20	11	3	51	21	+30	70	Promotion to Serie B
2	Foggia	34	19	8	7	61	31	+30	65	Qualification to the promotion play-offs
3	Lecce	34	17	12	5	46	28	+18	63	Qualification to the promotion play-offs
4	Casertana	34	18	9	7	52	35	+17	63	Qualification to the promotion play-offs
5	Cosenza	34	16	12	6	44	28	+16	60	
6	Matera (Note: Matera was deducted 2 points for match fixing.)	34	14	13	7	45	32	+13	53	
7	Fidelis Andria	34	11	12	11	33	21	+12	45	
8	Messina	34	10	15	9	37	41	−4	45	
9	Paganese (Note: Paganese was deducted one point for administrative irregularities.)	34	10	13	11	41	39	+2	42	
10	Juve Stabia	34	9	15	10	45	45	0	42	
11	Catanzaro	34	10	11	13	27	40	−13	41	
12	Akragas (Note: Akragas was deducted five points.)	34	12	9	13	35	47	−12	40	
13	Catania (Note: Catania was deducted 9 points for involvement in match fixing and later an additional 1 point for financial irregularities.)	34	12	13	9	37	34	+3	39	
14	Monopoli (O)	34	10	9	15	43	42	+1	39	Qualification to the relegation play-offs
15	Melfi	34	6	12	16	32	40	−8	30	Qualification to the relegation play-offs
16	Martina Franca (Note: Martina was deducted two points.) (R)	34	5	9	20	30	58	−28	22	Relegation to Serie D
17	Ischia (Note: Ischia was deducted 4 points.) (R)	34	5	10	19	31	65	−34	21	Qualification to the relegation play-offs
18	Lupa Castelli Romani (Note: Lupa Castelli Romani was deducted one point for administrative irregularities.)	34	2	7	25	22	65	−43	12	Relegation to Serie D

Source: Lega Pro
(C) Champions; (O) Play-off winners; (P) Promoted; (R) Relegated

== Promotion play-offs ==
Preliminary phase

15 May 2016
15:30

Lecce	3–0	Bassano Virtus

Stadio Via del Mare, Lecce
15 May 2016
16:00

Pisa	3–1	Maceratese

Arena Garibaldi, Pisa
15 May 2016
18:00

Pordenone	1–0	Casertana

Ottavio Bottecchia, Pordenone
15 May 2016
20:45

Foggia	2–0	Alessandria

Stadio Pino Zaccheria, Foggia

Final phase

Semifinals on 22 and 29 May 2016, finals on 5 and 12 June 2016.

Semifinals
2B	Pisa	3	0	3
2A	Pordenone	0	0	0
3C	Lecce	2	1	3
2C	Foggia	3	2	5

Finals
2B	Pisa	4	1	5
2C	Foggia	2	1	3

Pisa promoted to Serie B.

== Relegation play-outs ==
Play-outs on 21 and 28 May 2016, loser on aggregate is relegated. If tied on aggregate, lower-placed team is relegated.

Team 1	Agg.	Team 2	1st leg	2nd leg
Cuneo	0–1	Mantova	0–0	0–1
Martina Franca	1–0	Melfi	1–0	0–0
L'Aquila	2–4	Rimini	1–1	1–3
Ischia	2–4	Monopoli	0–3	2–1
Lupa Roma	3–3	Prato	2–0	1–3
Albinoleffe	1–3	Pro Piacenza	0–1	1–2
