= Alessandro Marotta =

Italian footballer (born 1986)

Personal information
- Date of birth: 15 July 1986 (age 40)
- Place of birth: Naples, Italy
- Height: 1.78 m (5 ft 10 in)
- Position: Forward

Team information
- Current team: Puteolana

Youth career
- Vomero
- 2002–2004: Ternana

Senior career*
Years	Team	Apps	(Gls)
2004–2007	Ternana	0	(0)
2004–2005	→ Spoleto (loan)	31	(8)
2005–2006	→ Olbia (loan)	4	(0)
2006–2007	→ Martina (loan)	4	(0)
2007	→ Igea Virtus (loan)	15	(0)
2007–2008	Scafatese	18	(0)
2008–2009	Arrone	32	(22)
2009–2010	Gubbio	32	(20)
2010–2014	Bari	27	(4)
2010–2011	→ Lucchese (loan)	28	(13)
2012	→ Spezia (loan)	12	(3)
2012–2013	→ Cremonese (loan)	17	(4)
2013	→ Benevento (loan)	13	(3)
2014	→ Grosseto (loan)	12	(6)
2014–2016	Benevento	62	(18)
2016–2018	Robur Siena	73	(28)
2018–2019	Catania	35	(9)
2019–2021	Vicenza	37	(8)
2021	Juve Stabia	15	(12)
2021–2022	Modena	8	(2)
2022–2023	Viterbese	32	(12)
2023	Giugliano	0	(0)
2023–2024	Benevento	22	(2)
2024–2025	Puteolana	0	(0)
2025-	Tivoli	0	(0)

International career
2003	Italy U18	1	(0)
- * Club domestic league appearances and goals as of 5 May 2024

Alessandro Marotta (born 15 July 1986) is an Italian professional footballer who plays as a forward for Tivoli.

== Club career ==
=== Ternana ===
Born in Naples, Campania, Marotta started his career at a local club of Vomero, Naples. In August 2002, he was loaned to the Umbria side Ternana and turned into a permanent deal in the next season. After spending a season with Serie D side Spoleto, in summer 2005, he was loaned to Serie C2 team Olbia from the Serie B side, but the loan was pre-matured in January 2006. With the Serie B struggler, he played no matches, and Ternana was relegated at the end of the season.

On 30 August 2006, he was loaned to fellow Serie C1 side Martina along with Raffaele Perna, which the club also signed Nicola Mancino in co-ownership deal. In January 2007, he was loaned to Serie C2 side Igea Virtus along with Jonatan Alessandro.

In the 2007–08 season, he left for Serie C2 side Scafatese in a co-ownership deal, along with Perna, who went on loan, but still failed to score any goals.

=== Serie D ===
Marotta left for Serie D side Arrone in summer 2008, and found a way to score, which earned him a contract with newly promoted Serie A side Bari in June 2009.

=== Bari ===
Marotta became a player of Bari in June 2009. However, he never settled in Bari but was loaned out several times.

=== Gubbio ===
He was farmed to Lega Pro Seconda Divisione (ex-Serie C2) side Gubbio in a co-ownership deal on 2 July 2009, for a peppercorn of €500. Bari youth products Giacinto Allegrini and Leonardo Pérez also joined the club on loan. With Gubbio, he scored 20 league goals in regular season (in Group B), and was the joint-topscorer of the league in regular season along with Daniel Ciofani (of Group C). Both players scored in promotion playoffs, with Marotta scoring once and Ciofani scoring twice, both winning the final, making Marotta the second highest topscorer of the league (overall).

=== Return to Bari ===
On 25 June 2010, Bari bought him back in a 2-year contract for €60,000. On 3 July, he was loaned to Lega Pro Prima Divisione side Lucchese. He scored 13 league goals as team-topscorer. On 1 July 2011, he signed a new 4-year contract with Bari.

On 12 January 2012, he was signed by Spezia Calcio of Serie B for €200,000.

Marotta left for Cremonese on 31 July 2012. On 15 January 2013 he left for Benevento. Marotta was a player for Bari in the first half of 2013–14 Serie B. On 10 January 2014 he left for Grosseto

=== Benevento ===
On 12 July 2014, Marotta was signed by Benevento in a 2-year contract.

=== Siena ===
On 10 August 2016, Marotta was signed by Robur Siena in a 3-year deal. He wore number 10 for the club.

=== Vicenza ===
On 15 July 2019, Marotta joined Vicenza on a 2-year contract.

=== Return to Serie C ===
On 1 February 2021, he moved to Serie C club Juve Stabia.

On 4 July 2021, he signed a two-year contract with Modena. He missed most of the 2021–22 season after a toe surgery.

On 30 August 2022, Marotta moved to Viterbese in Serie C.

On 17 July 2023, Marotta signed a one-year contract with Giugliano. Before the season started, on 24 August 2023 he moved again and returned to Benevento.

== International career ==
Marotta played his only game for the Italy youth national team at under-18 level on 10 December 2003, against the Slovenia national under-18 football team.

== Honours ==
Spezia

- Serie C1: 2011–12
- Supercoppa Serie C: 2012

Benevento

- Serie C: 2015–16

Vicenza

- Serie C: 2019–20

Modena

- Serie C: 2021–22
