= 2016–17 Serie B =

Italian football league season

Serie B
- Season: 2016–17
- Champions: SPAL (2nd title)
- Promoted: SPAL; Hellas Verona; Benevento (by play-off)
- Relegated: Trapani; Vicenza; Pisa; Latina (bankruptcy)
- Matches: 462
- Goals: 1,021 (2.21 per match)
- Top goalscorer: Giampaolo Pazzini (23 goals)
- Biggest home win: Virtus Entella 4–0 Brescia (29 October 2016); Cittadella 5–1 Hellas Verona (18 November 2016); Benevento 4–0 Brescia (19 November 2016); SPAL 4–0 Ternana (24 December 2016); Trapani 4–0 Bari (18 March 2017)
- Biggest away win: Avellino 0–5 Perugia (4 March 2017)
- Highest scoring: Ternana 4–3 Novara (29 October 2016); Benevento 3–4 Bari (24 February 2017)
- Longest winning run: 5 games Cittadella; SPAL
- Longest unbeaten run: 12 games Pro Vercelli; SPAL
- Longest winless run: 15 games Pisa
- Longest losing run: 6 games Ternana
- Highest attendance: 22,671; Bari 2–0 Brescia (27 February 2017)
- Lowest attendance: 1,566; Virtus Entella 4–1 Cittadella (18 May 2017)
- Total attendance: 3,192,945
- Average attendance: 6,911

The 2016–17 Serie B (known as the Serie B ConTe.it for sponsorship reasons) was the 85th season since its establishment in 1929. A total of 22 teams were contesting the league: 15 returning from the 2015–16 season, 4 promoted from Lega Pro, and 3 relegated from Serie A.

== Teams ==
=== Stadia and locations ===
Location of teams in 2016–17 Serie B

Team	Home city	Stadium	Capacity	2015–16 season
Ascoli	Ascoli Piceno	Del Duca	20,550	15th in Serie B
Avellino	Avellino	Partenio	26,000	14th in Serie B
Bari	Bari	San Nicola	58,270	5th in Serie B
Benevento	Benevento	Ciro Vigorito	12,847	Lega Pro/C Champions
Brescia	Brescia	Mario Rigamonti	16,308	11th in Serie B
Carpi	Carpi	Stadio Sandro Cabassi	4,144	18th in Serie A
Cesena	Cesena	Dino Manuzzi	23,900	6th in Serie B
Cittadella	Cittadella	Pier Cesare Tombolato	7,623	Lega Pro/A Champions
Frosinone	Frosinone	Stadio Matusa	10,000	19th in Serie A
Hellas Verona	Verona	Stadio Marc'Antonio Bentegodi	38,402	20th in Serie A
Latina	Latina	Domenico Francioni	6,850	16th in Serie B
Novara	Novara	Silvio Piola	17,875	8th in Serie B
Perugia	Perugia	Renato Curi	28,000	10th in Serie B
Pisa	Pisa	Arena Garibaldi	14,869	Lega Pro Play-off Winners
Pro Vercelli	Vercelli	Silvio Piola	5,500	17th in Serie B
Salernitana	Salerno	Arechi	37,245	18th in Serie B
SPAL	Ferrara	Paolo Mazza	17,955	Lega Pro/B Champions
Spezia	La Spezia	Alberto Picco	10,000	7th in Serie B
Ternana	Terni	Libero Liberati	17,500	12th in Serie B
Trapani	Trapani	Provinciale (Erice)	7,000	3rd in Serie B
Vicenza	Vicenza	Romeo Menti	17,163	13th in Serie B
Virtus Entella	Chiavari	Comunale	5,535	9th in Serie B

=== Personnel and kits ===
Team	President	Manager	Kit manufacturer	Shirt sponsor (front)	Shirt sponsor (back)	Shorts sponsor
Ascoli	(Canada) Francesco Bellini	(Italy) Alfredo Aglietti	Nike	Fainplast/CIAM, AMIK	Brosway	Conad
Avellino	(Italy) Walter Taccone	(Italy) Walter Novellino	Givova	Sienergia	Gruppo Taccone	Soft Technology
Bari	(Italy) Gianluca Paparesta	(Italy) Stefano Colantuono	Umbro	Betaland/Betpoint, Balkan Express/Sly Service Security	None	None
Benevento	(Italy) Oreste Vigorito	(Italy) Marco Baroni	Frankie Garage	IVPC, Liquore Strega	Rillo Costruzioni	None
Brescia	(Italy) Alessandro Triboldi	(Italy) Luigi Cagni	Acerbis	UBI Banco di Brescia	None	None
Carpi	(Italy) Claudio Caliumi	(Italy) Fabrizio Castori	Givova	Gaudì Jeans	None	None
Cesena	(Italy) Giorgio Lugaresi	(Italy) Andrea Camplone	Lotto	PLT Puregreen	None	None
Cittadella	(Italy) Andrea Gabrielli	(Italy) Roberto Venturato	Garman	OCSA/Gavinox, Gruppo Gabrielli	Metalservice	Veneta Nastri
Frosinone	(Italy) Maurizio Stirpe	(Italy) Pasquale Marino	Legea	Banca Popolare del Frusinate, Gala	7Sette	None
Hellas Verona	(Italy) Maurizio Setti	(Italy) Fabio Pecchia	Nike	Metano Nord, Extreme Printing/SEC	Chancebet.it	Consorzio San Zeno
Latina	(Italy) Pasquale Maietta	(Italy) Vincenzo Vivarini	Givova	Loggia, Innova	Villa Meravigliosa Ricevimenti	None
Novara	(Italy) Massimo De Salvo	(Italy) Roberto Boscaglia	Joma	Banca Popolare di Novara, Comoli Ferrari	Cristina Rubinetterie	None
Perugia	(Italy) Massimiliano Santopadre	(Italy) Cristian Bucchi	Frankie Garage	Officine Piccini, Fortinfissi	Tedesco Group	None
Pisa	(Italy) Giuseppe Corrado	(Italy) Gennaro Gattuso	Kappa	Toscana Aeroporti	Casa di Cura Privata San Rossore	None
Pro Vercelli	(Italy) Massimo Secondo	(Italy) Moreno Longo	Erreà	Meeting Art	None	None
Salernitana	(Italy) Marco Mezzaroma	(Italy) Alberto Bollini	Givova	Caffè Motta, eté Supermercati	SunTrades	IASA
SPAL	(Italy) Walter Mattioli	(Italy) Leonardo Semplici	HS Football	Vetroresina/958 Santero, Magnadyne	ErreEffe Group	Ceramica Sant'Agostino
Spezia	(Italy) Matteo Volpi	(Italy) Domenico Di Carlo	Acerbis	Arquati, Carispezia	958 Santero	None
Ternana	(Italy) Simone Longarini	(Italy) Fabio Liverani	Macron	None	None	None
Trapani	(Italy) Vittorio Morace	(Italy) Alessandro Calori	Joma	Ustica Lines/Liberty Lines	None	None
Vicenza	(Italy) Alfredo Pastorelli	(Italy) Vincenzo Torrente	Macron	Banca Popolare di Vicenza, Nordor Batterie	Faizane	GSC Group
Virtus Entella	(Italy) Antonio Gozzi	(Italy) Gianpaolo Castorina	Acerbis	Creditis, Arinox	Due Energie	None

=== Managerial changes ===
Team	Outgoing manager	Manner of departure	Date of vacancy	Position in table	Replaced by	Date of appointment
Ascoli	(Italy) Devis Mangia	Sacked	10 May 2016	Pre-season	(Italy) Alfredo Aglietti	16 June 2016
Frosinone	(Italy) Roberto Stellone	Sacked	15 May 2016	Pre-season	(Italy) Pasquale Marino	6 June 2016
Hellas Verona	(Italy) Luigi Delneri	Sacked	23 May 2016	Pre-season	(Italy) Fabio Pecchia	1 June 2016
Perugia	(Italy) Pierpaolo Bisoli	Sacked	24 May 2016	Pre-season	(Italy) Cristian Bucchi	15 June 2016
Virtus Entella	(Italy) Alfredo Aglietti	Resigned	26 May 2016	Pre-season	(Italy) Roberto Breda	1 July 2016
Avellino	(Italy) Attilio Tesser	Signed by Cremonese	31 May 2016	Pre-season	(Italy) Domenico Toscano	4 June 2016
Latina	(Italy) Carmine Gautieri	Sacked	12 June 2016	Pre-season	(Italy) Vincenzo Vivarini	13 June 2016
Benevento	(Italy) Gaetano Auteri	Sacked	14 June 2016	Pre-season	(Italy) Marco Baroni	1 July 2016
Novara	(Italy) Marco Baroni	Signed by Benevento	30 June 2016	Pre-season	(Italy) Roberto Boscaglia	1 July 2016
Pro Vercelli	(Italy) Claudio Foscarini	Signed by Livorno	30 June 2016	Pre-season	(Italy) Moreno Longo	1 July 2016
Ternana	(Italy) Roberto Breda	Signed by Virtus Entella	30 June 2016	Pre-season	(Italy) Christian Panucci	1 July 2016
Bari	(Italy) Andrea Camplone	Contract expired	30 June 2016	Pre-season	(Italy) Roberto Stellone	4 July 2016
Brescia	(Italy) Roberto Boscaglia	Signed by Novara	30 June 2016	Pre-season	(Italy) Cristian Brocchi	11 July 2016
Ternana	(Italy) Christian Panucci	Sacked	14 August 2016	Pre-season	(Italy) Benito Carbone	14 August 2016
Vicenza	(Italy) Franco Lerda	Sacked	2 October 2016	21st	(Italy) Pierpaolo Bisoli	3 October 2016
Cesena	(Italy) Massimo Drago	Sacked	30 October 2016	19th	(Italy) Andrea Camplone	31 October 2016
Bari	(Italy) Roberto Stellone	Sacked	7 November 2016	16th	(Italy) Stefano Colantuono	7 November 2016
Avellino	(Italy) Domenico Toscano	Sacked	29 November 2016	19th	(Italy) Walter Novellino	29 November 2016
Salernitana	(Italy) Giuseppe Sannino	Resigned	29 November 2016	14th	(Italy) Alberto Bollini	30 November 2016
Trapani	(Italy) Serse Cosmi	Sacked	30 November 2016	22nd	(Italy) Alessandro Calori	4 December 2016
Ternana	(Italy) Benito Carbone	Resigned	21 January 2017	21st	(Italy) Carmine Gautieri	22 January 2017
Ternana	(Italy) Carmine Gautieri	Resigned	5 March 2017	22nd	(Italy) Fabio Liverani	6 March 2017
Brescia	(Italy) Cristian Brocchi	Sacked	12 March 2017	19th	(Italy) Luigi Cagni	12 March 2017
Vicenza	(Italy) Pierpaolo Bisoli	Sacked	18 April 2017	19th	(Italy) Vincenzo Torrente	19 April 2017
Virtus Entella	(Italy) Roberto Breda	Sacked	30 April 2017	10th	(Italy) Gianpaolo Castorina	30 April 2017

== League table ==
Pos	Team	Pld	W	D	L	GF	GA	GD	Pts	Promotion, qualification or relegation
1	SPAL (C, P)	42	22	12	8	66	39	+27	78	Promotion to Serie A
2	Hellas Verona (P)	42	20	14	8	64	40	+24	74 (Note: Hellas Verona is ahead of Frosinone on head-to-head goal difference: Hellas Verona 2–0 Frosinone, Frosinone 1–0 Hellas Verona.)	Promotion to Serie A
3	Frosinone	42	21	11	10	57	42	+15	74	Qualification to promotion play-offs semi-finals
4	Perugia	42	15	20	7	54	40	+14	65 (Note: Perugia is ahead of Benevento on head-to-head points: Perugia 3–1 Benevento, Benevento 0–0 Perugia.)	Qualification to promotion play-offs semi-finals
5	Benevento (Note: Benevento was deducted one point.) (O, P)	42	18	12	12	56	42	+14	65	Qualification to promotion play-offs preliminary round
6	Cittadella	42	19	6	17	60	54	+6	63	Qualification to promotion play-offs preliminary round
7	Carpi	42	16	14	12	41	40	+1	62	Qualification to promotion play-offs preliminary round
8	Spezia	42	15	15	12	38	34	+4	60	Qualification to promotion play-offs preliminary round
9	Novara	42	15	11	16	48	50	−2	56	
10	Salernitana	42	13	15	14	44	44	0	54 (Note: Salernitana is ahead of Virtus Entella on head-to-head points: Salernitana 1–1 Virtus Entella, Virtus Entella 0–1 Salernitana.)	
11	Virtus Entella	42	13	15	14	54	51	+3	54	
12	Bari	42	13	14	15	39	44	−5	53 (Note: Bari is ahead of Cesena on head-to-head points: Bari 2–1 Cesena, Cesena 1–1 Bari.)	
13	Cesena	42	12	17	13	51	48	+3	53	
14	Avellino (Note: Avellino was initially deducted three points due to match fixing. The deduction was later changed to two points.)	42	13	13	16	40	55	−15	50 (Note: Avellino is ahead of Brescia on head-to-head points: Avellino 1–1 Brescia, Brescia 0–2 Avellino.)	
15	Brescia	42	11	17	14	49	58	−9	50	
16	Ascoli	42	10	19	13	44	49	−5	49 (Note: Head-to-head points: Ascoli 7 pts, Pro Vercelli 7 pts, Ternana 3 pts. Ascoli is ahead of Pro Vercelli on head-to-head record: Ascoli 3–1 Pro Vercelli, Pro Vercelli 1–1 Ascoli.)	
17	Pro Vercelli	42	10	19	13	35	45	−10	49	
18	Ternana (Note: Since the difference between the 18th-placed team and the 19th-placed team was five points, there was no play-out and the 19th-placed team was relegated directly.)	42	13	10	19	42	53	−11	49	
19	Trapani (R)	42	10	14	18	45	55	−10	44	Relegation to Serie C
20	Vicenza (R)	42	9	14	19	33	52	−19	41	Relegation to Serie C
21	Latina (Note: Latina was initially deducted seven points. The deduction was later changed to four points.) (R, E, R)	42	6	21	15	38	50	−12	35 (Note: Latina is ahead of Pisa on overall goal difference.)	Relegation to Serie D (Note: Latina was declared insolvent and excluded from the Italian football league system. The team was later refound in Serie D.)
22	Pisa (Note: Pisa was deducted four points.) (R)	42	6	21	15	23	36	−13	35	Relegation to Serie C

Source: Lega Serie B
Rules for classification: 1) Points; 2) Head-to-head points; 3) Head-to-head goal difference; 4) Goal difference; 5) Goals scored; 6) Draw.
(C) Champions; (E) Eliminated; (O) Play-off winners; (P) Promoted; (R) Relegated

== Promotion play-offs ==
According to the regulations, third-placed Frosinone would have avoided the play-offs if they had ended the regular season 10 points clear of fourth place. However, in the last round, Perugia and Benevento won their matches to leave the gap at nine points.

Six teams contested the promotion playoffs. A preliminary one-legged round, played at the home venue of the higher placed team, involved the teams from 5th to 8th place. The two winning teams played against the 3rd and 4th-placed teams in two-legged semi-finals. The higher placed team played the second leg of the promotion playoff at home.

Preliminary round
6	Cittadella	1
7	Carpi	2
5	Benevento	2
8	Spezia	1

Semi-finals
7	Carpi	0	1	1
3	Frosinone	0	0	0
5	Benevento	1	1	2
4	Perugia	0	1	1

Final
7	Carpi	0	0	0
5	Benevento	0	1	1

== Top goalscorers ==
Rank	Player	Club	Goals
1	(Italy) Giampaolo Pazzini	Hellas Verona	23
2	(Italy) Fabio Ceravolo	Benevento	20
3	(Italy) Francesco Caputo	Virtus Entella	18
3	(Italy) Mirco Antenucci	SPAL	18
5	(Italy) Federico Dionisi	Frosinone	17
6	(Italy) Daniel Ciofani	Frosinone	16
6	(Italy) Massimo Coda	Salernitana	16
8	(Italy) Kevin Lasagna	Carpi	14
8	(Italy) Andrea Caracciolo	Brescia	14
8	(Italy) Camillo Ciano	Cesena	14
11	(Italy) Gianluca Litteri	Cittadella	13
11	(Italy) Matteo Ardemagni	Avellino	13
11	(Italy) Samuel Di Carmine	Perugia	13
14	(Uruguay) Pablo Granoche	Spezia	12
14	(Italy) Daniele Cacia	Ascoli	12
14	(Bulgaria) Andrey Galabinov	Novara	12
14	(Uruguay) Felipe Avenatti	Ternana	12

== Results ==
Home \ Away	ASC	AVE	BAR	BEN	BRE	CRP	CES	CIT	FRO	HEL	LAT	NOV	PER	PIS	PVE	SAL	SPA	SPE	TER	TRA	VIC	VET
Ascoli		2–0	1–1	1–1	0–0	1–2	0–0	2–1	1–1	1–4	2–2	1–2	2–2	2–4	3–1	0–0	1–1	0–2	1–2	2–2	2–0	2–1
Avellino	1–2		1–1	1–1	1–1	1–0	1–1	0–1	0–1	2–0	2–1	1–1	0–5	1–0	3–2	3–2	1–0	1–0	1–0	0–0	3–1	2–2
Bari	0–1	2–1		0–4	2–0	2–0	2–1	1–2	1–0	0–2	2–0	0–0	0–0	0–0	2–0	2–0	1–1	1–1	3–1	3–0	2–1	1–1
Benevento	0–0	2–1	3–4		1–0	3–0	2–1	1–0	2–1	2–0	2–1	1–0	0–0	1–0	1–1	1–1	2–0	1–0	2–1	1–3	0–0	0–0
Brescia	1–0	0–2	1–1	1–0		2–2	3–2	4–1	2–0	0–1	1–1	0–0	1–1	1–1	2–1	1–1	1–3	1–1	2–1	2–1	2–1	2–2
Carpi	0–2	1–1	2–0	1–1	2–1		1–2	2–0	0–0	1–1	2–0	2–0	0–0	1–1	0–0	2–0	1–4	1–0	1–1	2–1	0–0	2–1
Cesena	2–2	3–0	1–1	4–1	1–1	1–0		3–0	1–1	0–0	2–2	0–1	1–1	2–0	1–2	0–0	1–1	1–0	1–0	3–1	1–1	0–1
Cittadella	0–1	1–3	2–0	1–0	0–3	4–1	2–3		2–3	5–1	2–1	3–1	1–1	1–0	0–0	2–0	1–2	1–0	2–0	3–2	2–0	2–1
Frosinone	3–1	1–1	3–1	3–2	1–0	1–0	2–1	1–1		1–0	2–1	2–3	1–2	0–0	2–1	1–3	2–1	2–0	1–1	1–0	3–1	2–0
Hellas Verona	0–0	3–1	1–0	2–2	2–2	1–1	3–0	2–0	2–0		4–1	0–4	2–2	1–1	3–0	2–0	0–0	0–1	2–0	2–0	3–2	1–0
Latina	0–0	0–0	2–1	1–1	1–1	0–1	1–1	0–2	0–1	2–0		0–1	2–2	1–1	0–0	1–1	1–2	0–0	1–1	2–0	0–1	1–1
Novara	1–0	1–0	1–0	1–0	2–3	2–1	3–1	1–1	1–2	2–2	2–2		0–1	1–1	0–0	1–0	0–1	2–1	2–2	2–2	2–1	2–0
Perugia	0–0	3–0	0–1	3–1	3–2	0–2	3–3	2–0	1–1	1–1	1–1	0–0		2–2	1–0	3–2	1–0	0–0	1–1	1–1	1–0	0–0
Pisa	2–1	0–1	0–0	0–3	1–0	0–0	0–1	1–4	0–0	0–0	1–1	1–0	0–1		1–1	0–1	0–1	0–0	1–0	1–0	0–1	1–1
Pro Vercelli	1–1	1–1	1–0	0–1	2–2	0–0	1–0	1–5	2–0	1–1	1–1	2–1	0–1	0–0		0–0	3–1	0–2	1–0	1–3	1–1	1–0
Salernitana	2–0	2–0	0–0	2–1	2–0	1–2	1–1	0–0	1–3	1–1	0–2	0–0	2–1	0–0	1–1		1–2	1–0	4–2	2–0	2–3	1–1
SPAL	1–1	3–0	2–1	2–0	3–2	3–1	2–0	2–1	0–2	1–3	0–0	2–0	2–0	1–1	0–0	3–2		2–1	4–0	2–1	3–0	2–2
Spezia	2–1	2–1	1–0	1–3	2–0	0–1	1–0	1–1	0–0	1–4	3–2	1–0	2–1	0–0	2–1	1–1	0–0		2–0	2–2	0–0	2–0
Ternana	0–1	4–1	0–0	0–1	1–0	0–0	1–1	1–0	2–0	0–3	0–1	4–3	0–1	1–0	1–2	1–0	2–1	1–1		2–1	1–2	3–0
Trapani	1–1	0–0	4–0	1–0	0–0	0–1	1–2	0–2	1–4	0–2	1–1	2–1	3–0	1–0	1–1	1–0	1–1	0–0	2–2		0–1	2–0
Vicenza	1–1	0–0	0–0	0–0	1–1	0–2	0–0	2–0	1–1	1–0	0–1	3–1	1–4	2–1	0–1	0–1	1–1	0–1	0–1	0–1		2–2
Virtus Entella	2–1	2–0	2–0	3–2	4–0	2–0	2–1	4–1	2–1	1–2	0–1	4–1	2–1	0–0	0–0	0–1	0–3	1–1	1–1	2–2	4–1	

Source: Eurosport
Legend: Blue = home team win; Yellow = draw; Red = away team win.

== Attendance data ==
Pos	Team	Total	High	Low	Average	Change
1	Bari	342,944	22,671	13,519	16,331	−23.7%
2	Hellas Verona	310,246	20,848	12,342	14,774	−18.8%^{1}
3	Cesena	259,125	17,048	11,177	12,339	+1.1%
4	Salernitana	229,398	19,709	8,120	10,924	−10.1%
5	Perugia	196,959	12,811	7,641	9,379	+1.5%
6	Benevento	170,722	11,521	6,807	8,130	+94.1%^{2}
7	SPAL	165,302	9,238	6,411	7,872	+53.4%^{2}
8	Vicenza	163,626	10,697	6,249	7,792	+1.5%
9	Brescia	161,791	14,358	6,441	7,704	+0.5%
10	Spezia	149,151	8,690	6,335	7,102	−2.2%
11	Pisa	143,326	8,645	2,722	6,825	+8.5%^{2}
12	Frosinone	124,378	7,229	5,340	5,923	−18.7%^{1}
13	Ascoli	115,848	7,128	4,784	5,517	−16.1%
14	Avellino	107,462	9,500	3,500	5,117	−19.0%
15	Trapani	106,215	6,345	4,322	5,058	−0.6%
16	Novara	88,259	7,402	3,644	4,203	−14.0%
17	Ternana	84,216	9,939	2,166	4,010	+16.9%
18	Cittadella	63,981	5,967	2,120	3,047	+55.6%^{2}
19	Pro Vercelli	60,147	4,582	2,218	2,864	−6.0%
20	Latina	51,467	4,485	1,867	2,451	−21.4%
21	Carpi	51,089	3,683	1,643	2,433	−72.9%^{1}
22	Virtus Entella	47,293	4,505	1,566	2,252	+3.7%
	League total	3,192,945	22,671	1,566	6,911	−3.5%

Notes:
1: Team played last season in Serie A.
2: Team played last season in Lega Pro.
