= Manolo Mosciaro =

Italian footballer (born 1985 in Cosenza)

Personal information
- Date of birth: 17 September 1985 (age 41)
- Place of birth: Cosenza, Italy
- Height: 1.85 m (6 ft 1 in)
- Position: Forward

Senior career*
Years	Team	Apps	(Gls)
2002–2003	Castrovillari	21	(2)
2003–2004	Sanremese	20	(4)
2004–2005	Cosenza 1914	23	(3)
2005–2007	Sanremese	45	(9)
2007–2008	Crotone	0	(0)
2008	Cappiano Cuoiopelli	9	(3)
2008–2009	Pro Patria	20	(3)
2009–2010	Catanzaro	32	(17)
2010–2011	Pisa	23	(5)
2011–2015	Nuova Cosenza	100	(53)
2015	Aversa Normanna	18	(4)
2015	Rende	7	(3)
2015–2016	Noto	17	(4)
2016–2017	Vigor Lamezia		
2017	Aprilia	9	(2)
2017–2018	ASD Calcio Biancavilla 1990		
2018–2019	Villaggio Europa Rende		
2020–2021	Luzzese Calcio 1965		
2022	Montalto Calcio 2018		
- * Club domestic league appearances and goals

Manolo Mosciaro (born 17 September 1985) is an Italian footballer who plays as a forward.

== Biography ==
=== Serie D years ===
Born in Cosenza, Calabria, Mosciaro started his career at Castrovillari, a local team in Castrovillari, in the province of Cosenza. He scored twice in 2002–03 Serie D. Castrovillari moved to Cosenza as A.S. Cosenza F.C. to replace the void of Cosenza Calcio 1914 SpA in 2003, which was excluded from professional football (but re-admitted to 2004–05 Serie D). In the same year Mosciaro left for another Serie D (Italian fifth division until 2014, top division of amateur football) team Sanremese, which he scored 4 times for the Ligurian club. The club was admitted to Serie C2 at the start of 2004–05 season. Yet in the same year Mosciaro returned to Cosenza for the old Cosenza, which he was played in the derby match against Cosenza F.C.

=== Serie C clubs ===
In 2005, he returned to Liguria region for Sanremese. He was a player in Serie C2 until the club relegation in 2007.

In August 2007 Mosciaro was signed by Serie C1 club Crotone. He left the Calabrian team in January 2008 for Cuoio Pelli – Cappiano Romaiano. He scored 3 goals for the Serie C2 club.

In 2008 Mosciaro left for Pro Patria, where he made his debut in the third division, now renamed as Lega Pro Prima Divisione.

In 2009, he returned to the fourth division for Calabrian club Catanzaro. He was the team topscorer of 17+1 goals, ahead Lucas Longoni (14+0 goals) and Antonio Montella (10+2 goals in league and playoffs, 2 goals in cup). The club failed to win the promotion playoffs. Mosciaro also played twice for Catanzaro in 2009–10 Lega Pro Cup.

In 2010, he was signed by another third division club Pisa.

=== Cosenza ===
In 2011 Mosciaro returned to Cosenza again. The football club of Cosenza folded again after 4 years of existence (since bought the club registration of Rende in 2007). The new entity Nuova Cosenza Calcio S.r.l. was admitted to 2011–12 Serie D. Mosciaro became a protagonist of the club as bomber. He scored 21 goals and 28 goals respectively in 2011–12 and 2012–13 Serie D season. The club promoted on 5 August to fill the vacancies. Mosciaro signed a new 2-year contract on 17 August 2013.

In 2013–14 Lega Pro Seconda Divisione the club "promoted" again, as Lega Pro (ex–Serie C) would reduced from two divisions to one, as well as 69 teams in 2013–14 season to 60 teams in 2014–15 Lega Pro. Cosenza finished as the fourth of group B. Mosciaro was the team joint-second scorer of 7 goals (along with Elio Calderini) behind Gianluca De Angelis and ahead Jonatan Alessandro.

=== Aversa Normanna ===
On 8 January 2015 he was signed by Aversa Normanna.

=== Rende ===
On 29 July 2015 Mosciaro returned to the province of Cosenza again for S.S. Rende.
