= Jonatan Alessandro =

Argentine footballer (born 1987)

Personal information
- Full name: Jonatan Alberto Alessandro
- Date of birth: 5 January 1987 (age 39)
- Place of birth: Buenos Aires, Argentina
- Height: 1.78 m (5 ft 10 in)
- Position: Forward

Team information
- Current team: L'Aquila
- Number: 20

Youth career
- Ternana

Senior career*
| Years | Team | Apps | (Gls) |
| 2006–2011 | Ternana | 40 | (3) |
| 2007 | → Igea Virtus (loan) | 7 | (0) |
| 2007–2008 | → Catanzaro (loan) | 17 | (2) |
| 2009 | → Cisco Roma (loan) | 11 | (4) |
| 2011–2012 | Sporting Terni | 20 | (8) |
| 2012–2013 | Chieti | 56 | (10) |
| 2013–2014 | Cosenza | 42 | (5) |
| 2014–2015 | Sambenedettese | 12 | (3) |
| 2015–2016 | Campobasso | 34 | (15) |
| 2016–2018 | Delta Rovigo | 53 | (22) |
| 2018 | Avezzano | 13 | (1) |
| 2018–2019 | Campobasso | 24 | (13) |
| 2019–2020 | Pineto | 19 | (3) |
| 2020–2021 | Latina | 32 | (9) |
| 2021–2022 | Vastese | 32 | (14) |
| 2022– | L'Aquila | 8 | (1) |
- * Club domestic league appearances and goals as of 20 February 2023

Jonatan Alberto Alessandro (born 5 January 1987) is an Argentine footballer who plays for Italian Serie D club L'Aquila.

== Biography ==
=== Ternana ===
Born in Buenos Aires, capital of Argentina, Alessandro moved to Italy at young age. He was a youth product of Ternana. He made his debut in 2006–07 Serie C1. In January 2007, he was loaned to Serie C2 side Igea Virtus – Barcellona along with Alessandro Marotta. On 31 August 2007 he was signed by Catanzaro. On 30 January 2009 Alessandro left for Cisco Roma. Alessandro became a regular member for Ternana from 2009 to 2011, despite mainly as substitute (27 as substitutes out of 35 appearances).

In 2011, he left for Serie D club Sporting Terni (top level of amateur football and Italian fifth level until 2014). The club used different stadium despite in the same city with Ternana.

=== Chieti ===
On 28 January 2012 Alessandro returned to professional football for Lega Pro Seconda Divisione (ex–Serie C2) club Chieti. Alessandro was the centre forward in 4-2-3-1 formation in the first 3 matches of promotion playoffs. Alessandro returned to play his usual position in the midfield in the last game, with Giuseppe Lacarra as forward.

He renewed the contract on 22 July.

=== Cosenza ===
On 28 July 2013 Alessandro was signed by Cosenza. The club was among 7 additional teams that admitted to the fourth division from 2013–14 Serie D to fill the vacancies on 5 August. (Note: Originally 9 promoted (1 non-admission), now 13 promoted from 2012–13 Serie D plus 2 re-admission of relegated teams of 2012–13 Lega Pro Seconda Divisione.) However it also saw at the end of 2013–14 season the two divisions of Lega Pro would be merged, as well as the reduction of 69 teams to 60 teams, thus 18 teams instead of 9 teams would be relegated.

As of round 32 the club was the runner-up, and had been mathematically promoted to Serie C. Alessandro scored 5 goals as the fourth scorer of the team, behind Gianluca De Angelis, Manolo Mosciaro and Elio Calderini.

=== Serie D ===
In July 2020 Alessandro signed for Latina where he played a big part in Latina getting promoted back to the Serie C. In the 2020–21 season he scored 9 goals in 32 matches as Latina finished second in the Serie D Girone G.

On 11 August 2021, he joined Vastese in Serie D.
