= Andrea Camplone =

Italian footballer and manager (born 1966)

Personal information
- Date of birth: 27 July 1966 (age 60)
- Place of birth: Pescara, Italy
- Height: 1.82 m (5 ft 11 1/2 in)
- Position: Defender

Youth career
- Pescara

Senior career*
Years	Team	Apps	(Gls)
1984–1992	Pescara	188	(1)
1992–1996	Perugia	71	(1)
1996–1998	Ancona	43	(2)
1998–1999	Gubbio	14	(1)

Managerial career
- 2002–2003: Penne
- 2003–2004: Alba Adriatica
- 2004–2006: Penne
- 2006–2007: Lanciano
- 2007: Pescara
- 2007–2008: Martina Franca
- 2008–2009: Cavese
- 2009–2010: Benevento
- 2010–2011: Virtus Lanciano
- 2012–2013: Perugia
- 2013–2015: Perugia
- 2015–2016: Bari
- 2016–2017: Cesena
- 2019: Catania
- 2020–2021: Arezzo
- * Club domestic league appearances and goals

Andrea Camplone (born 27 July 1966) is an Italian professional football coach and a former player. He was most recently the head coach of Serie C club Arezzo.

== Playing career ==
Born in Pescara, Camplone grew up playing with his hometown club, for whom he spent nine full seasons as a senior, amassing a total 188 games (52 of which at Serie A level). He left Pescara in 1992 to join Perugia, with whom he won two promotions (from Serie C1 to Serie B and then to Serie A in 1996)). He then spent two seasons with Ancona before ending his career in 1999 after a short stint with Gubbio.

== Coaching career ==
Camplone started his career as trainer at amateur Promozione level, guiding Abruzzo club Penne. In 2006, he took his first managing job at professional level, as head coach of Serie C1 club Lanciano, followed by a very short stint at hometown club Pescara and a number of other coaching jobs at Serie C1 level.

In November 2012 he was named head coach of Perugia, which he led to second place in the Serie C1/B league and subsequent elimination in the promotion playoff semifinals to Pisa. Following this defeat, he was dismissed from his position, only to be renamed as Perugia boss two months later after his replacement Cristiano Lucarelli was sacked before the first matchday of the season. On his second tenure at Perugia, Camplone managed to lead the Grifone to win the 2013–14 Lega Pro Prima Divisione title and get promoted to Serie B.

He eventually coached Serie B team Bari before being appointed head coach at Cesena on 31 October 2016.

However he failed to reach the playoffs and his team arrived at the 13th seed in the league table.

He was confirmed for the following season. On 30 September 2017, almost after 1 year of his appointment, he was sacked from the Emilian team after a 5–2 away defeat against Pro Vercelli; he has been replaced by Fabrizio Castori who returned to Cesena after 9 years.

In July 2019 he returned into club management, signing a one-year contract as the new head coach of Catania for the club's 2019–20 Serie C season. He was dismissed by Catania on 21 October 2019 following a 0–5 loss to Vibonese, which was 3rd loss in 4 games, with club in 9th position in the table.

On 19 October 2020 he was hired by Serie C club Arezzo. On 17 January 2021 he was sacked due to poor results.
