= Marco Iannascoli =

Italian footballer

Personal information
- Date of birth: 6 November 1994 (age 31)
- Place of birth: Pescara, Italy
- Position: Midfielder

Team information
- Current team: Penne

Youth career
- Pescara

Senior career*
Years	Team	Apps	(Gls)
2013–2014	Pescara	1	(0)
2013–2014	→ Aprilia (loan)	9	(0)
2014–2015	Ischia	14	(0)
2015–2016	L'Aquila	1	(0)
2016	Levico Terme	10	(0)
2016–2017	Monticelli	22	(1)
2017	Olympia Agnonese	3	(0)
2017–2019	Penne		
2019–2020	Castelnuovo		
2020–2021	Penne		
2021–2022	Hatria		
2022–	Penne		
- * Club domestic league appearances and goals as of 14 January 2018

Marco Iannascoli (born 6 November 1994) is an Italian footballer who plays for Italian Promozione side Penne.

== Biography ==
Born in Pescara, Italy, Iannascoli started his career at Pescara. He was a player of the under-13 team in 2006–07 season, as well as the under-15 team in 2008–09 season. He made his Serie A debut in the second last round of 2012–13 Serie A season.

On 19 July 2013 Iannascoli and Riccardo Ragni were signed by Aprilia in a temporary deal. Since July 2015 Iannascoli was a player of L'Aquila.

After spells at US Levico Terme, ASD Monticelli, Olympia Agnonese and Penne, Iannascoli joined ASD Castelnuovo Vomano in June 2019. However, he returned to Penne in August 2020. In July 2021, Iannascoli joined Hatria Calcio 1957.
