= Castorina =

Castorina is an Italian surname. Notable people with the surname include:

- Gianpaolo Castorina (born 1976), Italian soccer player and coach
- Ronald Castorina, American politician

== See also ==
- Castoria (disambiguation)
