= Barbuti =

Barbuti is an Italian surname. Notable people with the surname include:

- Massimo Barbuti (born 1958), Italian footballer and manager
- Ray Barbuti (1905–1988), American football player and sprinter
- Riccardo Barbuti (born 1992), Italian footballer
