= Riccardo Barbuti =

Italian footballer

Personal information
- Date of birth: 12 March 1992 (age 34)
- Place of birth: Sassuolo, Italy
- Height: 1.85 m (6 ft 1 in)
- Position: Forward

Team information
- Current team: Prato

Youth career
- Sassuolo

Senior career*
| Years | Team | Apps | (Gls) |
| 2011–2014 | Sassuolo | 6 | (0) |
| 2012–2013 | → Barletta (loan) | 19 | (1) |
| 2013–2014 | → Aprilia (loan) | 31 | (9) |
| 2014–2016 | Pescara | 0 | (0) |
| 2014–2015 | → Pordenone (loan) | 18 | (2) |
| 2015 | → Torres (loan) | 10 | (2) |
| 2015–2016 | → Lumezzane (loan) | 17 | (3) |
| 2016–2017 | Lumezzane | 21 | (4) |
| 2017–2019 | Teramo | 60 | (7) |
| 2018 | → Gavorrano (loan) | 16 | (2) |
| 2019–2021 | Fano | 61 | (17) |
| 2021–2022 | Trento | 31 | (2) |
| 2022–2023 | Pistoiese | 14 | (0) |
| 2023–2024 | Alcione | 32 | (6) |
| 2024– | Prato | 0 | (0) |
- * Club domestic league appearances and goals as of 5 May 2024

Riccardo Barbuti (born 12 March 1992) is an Italian footballer who plays for Serie D club Prato.

== Biography ==
=== Sassuolo ===
Born in Sassuolo, Emilia region, Barbuti started his career at U.S. Sassuolo Calcio. Barbuti was a player of the under-17 team in the 2008–09 season.

In 2012–13 season he was signed by Barletta in a co-ownership deal, for a peppercorn of €500. In June 2013 Sassuolo bought Barbuti, also for a peppercorn of €500. In summer 2013 Barbuti was a player of Aprilia, which his future club Pescara also loaned Riccardo Ragni and Marco Iannascoli to the team. Barbuti scored 9 goals, 1 goal behind Antonio Montella.

=== Pescara ===
On 1 July 2014, Barbuti became a free agent. He was immediately signed by Pescara on a free transfer. On 3 August Barbuti was signed by Pordenone in a temporary deal. On 16 January 2015, Barbuti was signed by Torres.

=== Lumezzane ===
Barbuti was included in the first team of Pescara at the start of 2015–16 Serie B. He wore No. 23 shirt. On 31 August he was signed by Lumezzane in a temporary deal. On 29 July 2016, Barbuti was signed by Lumezzane in a 2-year deal.

=== Fano ===
On 21 August 2019, he signed a 2-year contract with Fano.

=== Trento ===
On 12 July 2021, he signed with newly promoted Serie C club Trento.

=== Pistoiese ===
On 1 September 2022, Barbuti joined Serie D club Pistoiese.
