= Elio Calderini =

Italian professional footballer (born 1988)

Personal information
- Date of birth: 9 June 1988 (age 38)
- Place of birth: Città di Castello, Italy
- Height: 1.86 m (6 ft 1 in)
- Position: Left winger

Team information
- Current team: Fulgens Foligno

Youth career
- Perugia
- 2005–2007: Arezzo

Senior career*
Years	Team	Apps	(Gls)
2007–2008	Arezzo	0	(0)
2007	→ Juve Stabia (loan)	2	(0)
2008–2009	Flaminia	34	(10)
2009–2011	Frosinone	0	(0)
2009–2010	→ Foligno (loan)	19	(5)
2010–2011	→ Sangiovannese (loan)	25	(4)
2011–2013	Aprilia	60	(16)
2013–2015	Cosenza	61	(16)
2015–2016	Catania	31	(3)
2016–2017	Fondi	36	(8)
2017–2018	Foggia	11	(0)
2018	→ Viterbese (loan)	20	(2)
2018–2019	Sambenedettese	33	(5)
2019–2021	Carrarese	39	(3)
2021	Cavese	11	(1)
2021	Tiferno Lerchi	11	(6)
2021–2022	Arezzo	20	(13)
2022–2023	Città di Castello	27	(7)
2023–	Fulgens Foligno	11	(4)
- * Club domestic league appearances and goals as of 16 November 2024

Elio Calderini (born 9 June 1988) is an Italian professional footballer who plays for Serie D club Fulgens Foligno

== Biography ==
Born in Città di Castello, in the province of Perugia, in Umbria region, Calderini was a youth product of A.C. Perugia. He played for both under-17 and U18 team in 2004–05 season. After the bankruptcy of Perugia, he joined Serie B club Arezzo. He spent 1 1/2 seasons in the reserve team. In January 2007 he left for Serie C1 club Juve Stabia.

Calderini left for Serie D club Flaminia in 2008. He played 34 times for the Lazio club in the top division of amateur football (and fifth division of Italy until 2014).

=== Frosinone ===
In July 2009 he was signed by fellow Lazio club Frosinone. However, he failed to secure a place in the Serie B club. On 31 August 2009 Calderini left for Lega Pro Prima Divisione (ex–Serie C1) club Foligno. Calderini and Guarracino were signed by Lega Pro Seconda Divisione (ex–Serie C2) club Sangiovannese on 12 July 2010.

Frosinone relegated to L.P. Prime Division from Serie B in 2011.

=== Aprilia ===
On 26 August 2011 Calderini was sold to L.P. 2nd Division club Aprilia.

=== Cosenza ===
In July 2013 Calderini was signed by Cosenza. The club was among 6 additional teams that admitted to the fourth division from 2013–14 Serie D to fill the vacancies on 5 August (originally 9, now 13 promoted plus 2 re-admission of relegated teams). However at the end of season also saw the merger of the divisions of Lega Pro, as well as reduction of 69 teams to 60 teams (increased from 9 relegated teams to 18 teams). Cosenza mathematically promoted to Serie C after the round 30 matches. That season Calderini scored 7 goals as team joint-second topscorer, along with Manolo Mosciaro behind Gianluca De Angelis (11 goals) and ahead Jonatan Alessandro (5 goals).

=== Carrarese ===
On 22 August 2019, he signed with Carrarese.

=== Cavese ===
On 12 January 2021, he moved to Cavese.

=== Serie D ===
On 5 August 2021, he joined Tiferno Lerchi in Serie D.
