= Lucas Correa =

Argentine footballer (born 1984)

Personal information
- Full name: Lucas Alberto Correa Belmonte
- Date of birth: 3 February 1984 (age 42)
- Place of birth: Rosario, Argentina
- Height: 1.80 m (5 ft 11 in)
- Position: Midfielder

Team information
- Current team: Castiadas

Youth career
- 1999–2002: Rosario Central

Senior career*
Years	Team	Apps	(Gls)
2002–2004	Rosario Central	4	(0)
2004–2005	Penne	32	(4)
2005–2006	Lanciano	36	(4)
2007–2010	Lazio	0	(0)
2007	→ Lucchese (loan)	10	(2)
2007–2008	→ Gallipoli (loan)	24	(3)
2008–2009	→ Pro Patria (loan)	27	(12)
2009–2010	→ Taranto (loan)	10	(3)
2010	→ Ravenna (loan)	13	(1)
2011	Varese	11	(1)
2011–2012	Avellino	10	(0)
2012–2013	Bassano	45	(14)
2013–2014	Casertana	30	(2)
2016	Bisceglie	3	(0)
2017–2018	Mantova	27	(10)
2018	Tuttocuoio	12	(2)
2018–2019	ASD Oasi Sanfeliciana		
2019–2020	Tuttocuoio	6	(0)
2020–	Castiadas		

International career
2001	Argentina U17		
- * Club domestic league appearances and goals as of 22:54, 8 May 2019 (UTC)

Lucas Alberto Correa Belmonte (born 3 February 1984) is an Argentine footballer who plays as a midfielder for Italian club Castiadas.

He also holds a Spanish passport, to be eligible to get around the non-EU quota imposed in European leagues.

== Club career ==
Correa started his career at Rosario Central. In summer 2004 he left for Italian Eccellenza side Penne. He then signed by Serie C1 side Lanciano. In January 2007 S.S. Lazio paid €500,000 to sign the player, which he signed a contract until June 2011. Correa spent 3 1/2 seasons on loan at Lega Pro Prima Divisione clubs. Lazio received €50,000, €50,000 and €100,000 from Gallipoli, Pro Patria and Taranto respectively for the loan deal. He failed to loan out at the start of 2010–11 Serie A until January 2011 left for Varese in 6 months deal on free transfer.

In July 2011 he left for Avellino In January 2012 he was loaned to Bassano. In July 2012 Avellino sold him to Bassano for free.

On 3 August 2013 he was signed by Casertana.

Ahead of the 2019/20 season, Correa returned to Tuttocuoio for the second time. Six months later, in January 2020, he moved to Eccellenza club Castiadas.

== International career ==
Correa played for the Argentina U17 team at the 2001 FIFA U-17 World Championship.
