= Antonio Montella =

Italian footballer (born 1986)

Personal information
- Full name: Antonio Ciro Montella
- Date of birth: 4 April 1986 (age 40)
- Place of birth: Naples, Italy
- Height: 1.82 m (6 ft 0 in)
- Position: Forward

Senior career*
Years	Team	Apps	(Gls)
2003–2005	Aprilia	41	(8)
2005–2008	Messina	2	(0)
2005–2006	→ Rieti (loan)	25	(2)
2007–2008	→ Igea Virtus (loan)	29	(10)
2008–2010	Catanzaro	50	(17)
2010–2011	Salernitana	5	(1)
2011–2013	FeralpiSalò	44	(5)
2013–2014	Aprilia	27	(10)
2014–2015	Vigor Lamezia	34	(10)
2015–2017	Pisa	41	(5)
2017–2018	AlbinoLeffe	38	(5)
2018–2019	Modena	33	(5)
2019	Nuova Florida	11	(2)
2019–2020	Aprilia	11	(0)
2020–2023	Aprilia CSP		
Total		391	(80)
- * Club domestic league appearances and goals

Antonio Ciro Montella (born 4 April 1986) is an Italian footballer who plays as a forward.

== Biography ==
=== Aprilia ===
Born in Naples, Campania, Montella started his career at Lazio club Aprilia. He played for the club in Serie D (Italian fifth level until 2014) from 2003 to January 2005.

=== Messina ===
In January 2005 he was signed by Serie A club Messina, where he was contracted for 3 1/2 years. He was a player for the reserve team in the remainder of 2004–05 season. In 2005, he was signed by Rieti of Serie C2 — the fourth and lowest division of professional league (until 2014).

Montella returned to Sicily Island in 2006–07 Serie A. He played twice in the last two rounds of the season. He returned to Serie C2 for Igea Virtus – Barcellona in 2007–08 Serie C2 in temporary deal. He became a free agent after Messina bankrupted in July 2008.

=== Catanzaro ===
Montella joined Lega Pro Seconda Divisione (ex–Serie C2) club F.C. Catanzaro in 2008, where he played 2 seasons. The club finished as the losing side of promotion playoffs twice, in 2009 and 2010. Montella and teammate Francesco Corapi scored 2 goals in 2010 promotion playoffs, as joint-second-highest scorer in that round, along with Alessandro Cesca (San Marino), Daniel Ciofani (Cisco Roma) and Antonio Gaeta (Legnano). In regular season Montella scored 10 goals as team third scorer, behind Manolo Mosciaro (17 goals) and Lucas Longoni (14 goals). Montella also scored a brace in 2009–10 Lega Pro Cup, the only goals of the team. After the match Montella and Corapi replaced Mosciaro and Cardascio as new forward partner of Caputo in 3-4-3 formation, however the club lost 0–1. In the last match of the cup Montella was dropped from call-up.

=== Salernitana ===
Montella joined Salernitana in 2010 of Lega Pro Prima Divisione (ex–Serie C1). The club also finished as the losing side of promotion playoffs. Salernitana Calcio 1919 bankrupted in 2011 after 6 years of existence.

=== FeralpiSalò ===
Montella was signed by another third division club FeralpiSalò in 2011. He spent 2 seasons in the Lombard town with 5 goals.

=== Aprilia return ===
Montella returned to Aprilia on 31 August 2013. That season was the last season of Lega Pro Seconda Divisione, which at the end of season the two divisions of Lega Pro (ex–Serie C) would be merged back to one division since the split in 1978. Montella along with Riccardo Barbuti, were the starting forward of the team; Montella scored 10 goals for the team which relegated.

=== Vigor Lamezia ===
On 8 July 2014 he was signed by Vigor Lamezia.

=== Pisa ===
On 17 July 2015 he was signed by Pisa.

=== Albinoleffe ===
On 19 January 2017 he joined Albinoleffe.

=== Modena ===
On 24 August 2018 he was signed by Modena.

=== Nuova Florida ===
On 14 August 2019, he joined Serie D team Nuova Florida.
