= 2014–15 Lega Pro =

Lega Pro
- Season: 2014–15
- Champions: Novara (Group A); Teramo stripped of title for match fixing, title given to Ascoli (Group B); Salernitana (Group C); Como (Playoffs)
- Relegated: Real Vicenza, Venezia, Monza, Torres (Group A); Forlì, Grosseto, Gubbio, San Marino (Group B); Barletta, Aversa Normanna, Reggina, Savoia, Vigor Lamezia (Group C)

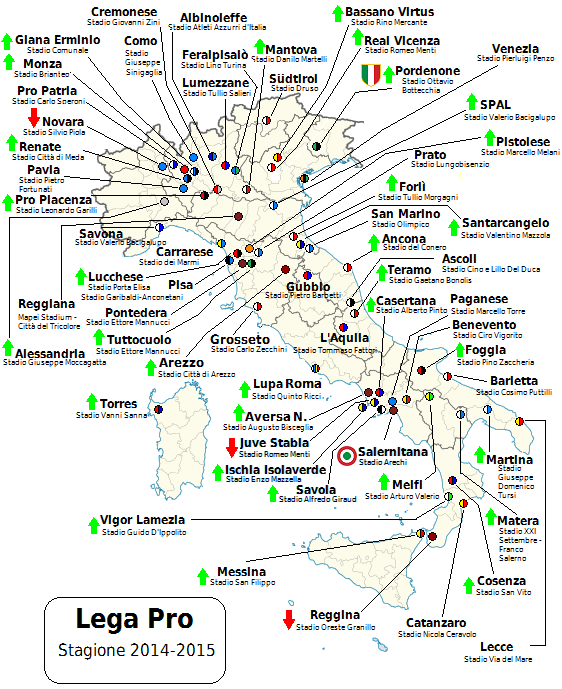
Lega Pro 2014-2015 Teams

The 2014–15 Lega Pro was the first season of the unified Lega Pro division in place of the old Prima Divisione and Seconda Divisione. The league is composed of 60 teams divided into three different groups of 20 each.

== Teams ==
A total of 60 teams will contest the league, divided into three groups of 20 teams. Originally, teams would include 4 sides relegated from the 2013–14 Serie B season, 29 sides playing the 2013–14 Prima Divisione season, 18 sides playing the 2013–14 Seconda Divisione season, and 9 sides promoted from the 2013–14 Serie D season. In the middle of last season Nocerina was expelled from Lega Pro (on 1 August was admitted to Eccellenza); on 15 July 2014 CoViSoc expelled Padova and Viareggio due to financial reasons; on 1 August 2014 FIGC admitted 3 teams that were relegated in the last season, thus the league included 3 sides from 2013–14 Serie B, 27 sides from 2013–14 Prima Divisione, 21 sides from 2013–14 Seconda Divisione and 9 sides from 2013–14 Serie D.

On 13 June 2014, 59 teams had mathematically achieved qualification for the 2014–15 season.

On 1 July 2014, all 59 teams had submitted the application for a license for 2014–15 season, with 8 teams did not submit the required bank guarantee, including Padova. Moreover, Viareggio submitted a guarantee that would not comply with the new regulation passed in May 2014. Correggese, the Serie D playoffs winner, did not submit an application.

On 15 July 2014, the deadline of submission, Padova failed to submit the bank guarantee and were declared bankrupt, while 7 teams had submitted in time. On 18 July 2014 the appeal of Viareggio to the exclusion had failed.

On 1 August 2014 the Federal Council admitted to Lega Pro Aversa Normanna, Martina Franca and Torres, the 3 teams relegated in 2013–14 Seconda Divisione. One more vacancy was created in August after the Italian National Olympic Committee Court of Appeal agreed upon an appeal from Novara, who requested the 2014–15 Serie B season should feature an even number of teams (22) instead of the originally scheduled 21 ones; after this appeal from Novara, Vicenza was admitted to 2014–15 Serie B and Arezzo replaced it in Lega Pro group A.

Group A, North and Sardinia

- AlbinoLeffe, from Prima Divisione, Girone A
- Alessandria, from Seconda Divisione, Girone A
- Arezzo, from Serie D, Girone E
- Bassano Virtus, from Seconda Divisione, Girone A
- Como, from Prima Divisione, Girone A
- Cremonese, from Prima Divisione, Girone A
- FeralpiSalò, from Prima Divisione, Girone A
- Giana Erminio, from Serie D, Girone A
- Lumezzane, from Prima Divisione, Girone A
- Mantova, from Seconda Divisione, Girone A
- Monza, from Seconda Divisione, Girone A
- Novara, from Serie B
- Pavia, from Prima Divisione, Girone A
- Pordenone, from Serie D, Girone C
- Pro Patria, from Prima Divisione, Girone A
- Real Vicenza, from Seconda Divisione, Girone A
- Renate, from Seconda Divisione, Girone A
- Südtirol, from Prima Divisione, Girone A
- Torres, from Seconda Divisione, Girone A
- Venezia, from Prima Divisione, Girone A

Group B, North and Central

- Ancona, from Serie D, Girone F
- Ascoli, from Prima Divisione, Girone B
- Carrarese, from Prima Divisione, Girone A
- Forlì, from Seconda Divisione, Girone A
- Grosseto, from Prima Divisione, Girone B
- Gubbio, from Prima Divisione, Girone B
- L'Aquila, from Prima Divisione, Girone B
- Lucchese, from Serie D, Girone D
- Pisa, from Prima Divisione, Girone B
- Pistoiese, from Serie D, Girone E
- Pontedera, from Prima Divisione, Girone B
- Prato, from Prima Divisione, Girone B
- Pro Piacenza, from Serie D, Girone B
- Reggiana, from Prima Divisione, Girone A
- San Marino, from Prima Divisione, Girone A
- Santarcangelo, from Seconda Divisione, Girone A
- Savona, from Prima Divisione, Girone A
- SPAL, from Seconda Divisione, Girone A
- Teramo, from Seconda Divisione, Girone B
- Tuttocuoio, from Seconda Divisione, Girone B

Group C, South

- Aversa Normanna, from Seconda Divisione, Girone B
- Barletta, from Prima Divisione, Girone B
- Benevento, from Prima Divisione, Girone B
- Casertana, from Seconda Divisione, Girone B
- Catanzaro, from Prima Divisione, Girone B
- Cosenza, from Seconda Divisione, Girone B
- Foggia, from Seconda Divisione, Girone B
- Ischia, from Seconda Divisione, Girone B
- Juve Stabia, from Serie B
- Lupa Roma, from Serie D, Girone G
- Lecce, from Prima Divisione, Girone B
- Martina Franca, from Seconda Divisione, Girone B
- Matera, from Serie D, Girone H
- Melfi, from Seconda Divisione, Girone B
- Messina, from Seconda Divisione, Girone B
- Paganese, from Prima Divisione, Girone B
- Reggina, from Serie B
- Salernitana, from Prima Divisione, Girone B
- Savoia, from Serie D, Girone I
- Vigor Lamezia, from Seconda Divisione, Girone B

=== Stadia and locations ===
Note: Table lists in alphabetical order.

==== Group A (North and Sardinia) ====
Location of teams in Lega Pro (Group A) 2014–15
Location of teams in 2014–15 Lega Pro (Group A) (Lombardy)

Club	City	Stadium	Capacity
AlbinoLeffe	Albino and Leffe (playing in Bergamo)	Atleti Azzurri d'Italia	26,542
Alessandria	Alessandria	Giuseppe Moccagatta	5,827
Arezzo	Arezzo	Città di Arezzo	13,128
Bassano Virtus	Bassano del Grappa	Rino Mercante	2,952
Cremonese	Cremona	Giovanni Zini	20,641
Como	Como	Giuseppe Sinigaglia	13,602
FeralpiSalò	Salò	Lino Turina	2,000
Giana Erminio	Gorgonzola	Città di Gorgonzola^{1}	3,766
Lumezzane	Lumezzane	Nuovo Comunale	4,150
Mantova	Mantua	Danilo Martelli	14,884
Monza	Monza	Brianteo	18,568
Novara	Novara	Silvio Piola	17,875
Pavia	Pavia	Pietro Fortunati	4,999
Pordenone	Pordenone	Ottavio Bottecchia	3,000
Pro Patria	Busto Arsizio	Carlo Speroni	4,627
Real Vicenza	Vicenza	Romeo Menti	12,200
Renate	Renate (playing in Meda)	Città di Meda	3,000
Südtirol	Bolzano	Druso	3,500
Torres	Sassari	Vanni Sanna	12,000
Venezia	Venezia	Pier Luigi Penzo	7,450

^{1}Giana Erminio played most of the season in the Stadio Brianteo in Monza while their home stadium was renovated.

==== Group B (North and Central) ====
Location of teams in Lega Pro (Group B) 2014–15
Location of teams in 2014–15 Lega Pro (Group B) (Tuscany)

Club	City	Stadium	Capacity
Ancona	Ancona	del Conero	23,983
Ascoli	Ascoli Piceno	Cino e Lillo Del Duca	20,550
Carrarese	Carrara	Dei Marmi	15,000
Forlì	Forlì	Tullo Morgagni	3,466
Grosseto	Grosseto	Carlo Zecchini	10,200
Gubbio	Gubbio	Pietro Barbetti	5,300
L'Aquila	L'Aquila	Stadio Tommaso Fattori	10,000
Lucchese	Lucca	Porta Elisa	7,386
Pisa	Pisa	Arena Garibaldi	14,869
Pistoiese	Pistoia	Marcello Melani	13,195
Pontedera	Pontedera	Ettore Mannucci	5,000
Prato	Prato	Lungobisenzio	6,800
Pro Piacenza	Piacenza	Leonardo Garilli	21,668
Reggiana	Reggio Emilia	Città del Tricolore	20,084
San Marino	Serravalle	Olimpico	7,000
Santarcangelo	Santarcangelo di Romagna	Stadio Valentino Mazzola	3,000
Savona	Savona	Valerio Bacigalupo	4,000
SPAL	Ferrara	Paolo Mazza	17,955
Teramo	Teramo	Gaetano Bonolis	7,498
Tuttocuoio	San Miniato (playing in Pontedera)	Ettore Mannucci	5,000

==== Group C (South) ====
Location of teams in Lega Pro (Group C) 2014–15
Location of teams in Lega Pro (Group C) 2014–15 (Lazio)
Location of teams in Lega Pro (Group C) 2014–15 (Campania)

Club	City	Stadium	Capacity
Aversa Normanna	Aversa	Augusto Bisceglia	2,555
Barletta	Barletta	Cosimo Puttilli	4,018
Benevento	Benevento	Ciro Vigorito	12,847
Casertana	Caserta	Alberto Pinto	12,000
Catanzaro	Catanzaro	Nicola Ceravolo	14,650
Cosenza	Cosenza	San Vito	24,479
Foggia	Foggia	Pino Zaccheria	25,000
Ischia	Ischia	Vincenzo Mazzella	5,000
Juve Stabia	Castellammare di Stabia	Romeo Menti	7,642
Lecce	Lecce	Via del Mare	33,876
Lupa Roma	Rome (playing in Aprilia)	Quinto Ricci	3,000
Martina Franca	Martina Franca	Gian Domenico Tursi	4,900
Matera	Matera	Franco Salerno	8,500
Melfi	Melfi	Arturo Valerio	4,100
Messina	Messina	San Filippo	37,895
Paganese	Pagani	Marcello Torre	5,900
Reggina	Reggio Calabria	Oreste Granillo	27,454
Salernitana	Salerno	Arechi	37,245
Savoia	Torre Annunziata	Alfredo Giraud	10,750
Vigor Lamezia	Lamezia Terme	Guido D'Ippolito	5,842

== League tables ==
=== Group A (North) ===
Pos	Team	Pld	W	D	L	GF	GA	GD	Pts	Promotion, qualification or relegation
1	Novara (Note: Novara was docked 8 points due to financial irregularities, later reduced to 3.) (C, P)	38	22	11	5	58	30	+28	74	Promotion to Serie B
2	Bassano Virtus	38	21	11	6	57	37	+20	74	Promotion play-offs
3	Pavia (Note: Pavia was docked 1 point due to financial irregularities.)	38	19	12	7	58	43	+15	68	Promotion play-offs
4	Como (O, P)	38	20	7	11	48	33	+15	67	Promotion playoffs winner
5	Alessandria	38	17	14	7	51	31	+20	65	
6	Feralpisalò	38	14	14	10	43	41	+2	56	
7	Real Vicenza (E)	38	12	16	10	44	38	+6	52	Disbanded
8	Cremonese	38	12	14	12	45	44	+1	50	
9	Arezzo	38	12	13	13	35	36	−1	49	
10	Südtirol	38	12	11	15	40	41	−1	47	
11	Mantova (Note: Mantova was docked 3 points due to financial irregularities.)	38	14	7	17	37	34	+3	46	
12	Venezia (Note: Venezia was deducted 3 points. At the end of season a phoenix club was admitted to Serie D due to bankruptcy of the original club) (E, R)	38	13	10	15	47	44	+3	46	Phoenix in Serie D
13	Giana Erminio	38	12	9	17	32	39	−7	45	
14	Renate	38	11	12	15	35	49	−14	45	
15	Monza (Note: Monza was docked 6 points due to financial irregularities. At the end of season a phoenix was admitted to Serie D due to bankruptcy of the original club.) (E, R)	38	11	12	15	37	38	−1	39	Phoenix in Serie D
16	Pro Patria (Note: Pro Patria was docked 1 point due to financial irregularities. On 1 September the team was readmitted to 2015–16 Lega Pro season)	38	9	12	17	45	65	−20	38	Relegation play-off (annulled)
17	Lumezzane	38	8	11	19	31	50	−19	35	Relegation play-off (annulled)
18	Pordenone (Note: Pordenone was readmitted to Lega Pro to fill the vacancies .) (T)	38	9	7	22	30	53	−23	34	Relegation play-off (annulled)
19	AlbinoLeffe (Note: AlbinoLeffe was readmitted to Lega Pro to fill the vacancies.) (T)	38	7	11	20	27	51	−24	32	Reinstated
20	Torres (Note: Torres was placed last and relegated as punishment for match fixing) (D, R)	38	11	14	13	35	38	−3	47	Relegation to Serie D

Source: Datasport.it
(C) Champions; (D) Disqualified; (E) Eliminated; (O) Play-off winners; (P) Promoted; (R) Relegated; (T) Qualified, but not yet for the particular phase indicated

=== Group B (Central) ===
Pos	Team	Pld	W	D	L	GF	GA	GD	Pts	Promotion, qualification or relegation
1	Teramo (Note: Teramo was stripped the promotion due to match fixing.) (D)	38	21	12	5	62	32	+30	75	
2	Ascoli (P)	38	19	14	5	61	37	+24	71	Promotion to Serie B
3	Reggiana	38	18	11	9	53	31	+22	65	Promotion play-offs
4	SPAL	38	18	8	12	46	31	+15	62	
5	Pisa	38	16	11	11	44	35	+9	59	
6	Ancona	38	14	15	9	46	38	+8	57	
7	L'Aquila	38	14	12	12	40	36	+4	54	
8	Tuttocuoio	38	13	11	14	45	58	−13	50	
9	Pontedera	38	12	12	14	41	41	0	48	
10	Lucchese	38	12	12	14	43	45	−2	48	
11	Grosseto (Note: Grosseto was deducted 1 point due to financial irregularities.) (E, R)	38	11	14	13	43	41	+2	46	Phoenix in Serie D
12	Santarcangelo	38	10	14	14	35	39	−4	44	
13	Prato	38	9	17	12	41	48	−7	44	
14	Pistoiese	38	11	11	16	45	62	−17	44	
15	Carrarese	38	9	17	12	47	46	+1	44	
16	Gubbio (R)	38	10	13	15	46	51	−5	43	Qualification to the relegation play-offs
17	Forlì (R)	38	11	10	17	41	55	−14	43	Qualification to the relegation play-offs
18	Pro Piacenza (Note: Pro Piacenza was deducted 8 points for having fielded a disqualified player throughout the previous season. The penalty was later reduced to 5.)	38	12	9	17	34	50	−16	40	Qualification to the relegation play-offs
19	Savona (Note: Savona was deducted 2 points for financial irregularities.)	38	10	10	18	36	59	−23	38	Qualification to the relegation play-offs
20	San Marino (R)	38	9	9	20	42	56	−14	36	Relegation to Serie D

Source: Datasport
(D) Disqualified; (E) Eliminated; (P) Promoted; (R) Relegated

=== Group C (South) ===
Pos	Team	Pld	W	D	L	GF	GA	GD	Pts	Promotion, qualification or relegation
1	Salernitana (P)	38	24	8	6	56	31	+25	80	Promotion to Serie B
2	Benevento	38	21	13	4	55	29	+26	76	Promotion play-offs
3	Matera	38	20	10	8	56	38	+18	70	Promotion play-offs
4	Juve Stabia	38	19	13	6	58	37	+21	70	Promotion play-offs
5	Casertana	38	20	9	9	59	35	+24	69	
6	Lecce	38	20	7	11	50	32	+18	67	
7	Foggia (Note: Foggia was deducted 1 point due to financial irregularities.)	38	18	13	7	63	36	+27	66	
8	Catanzaro	38	14	11	13	48	44	+4	53	
9	Melfi (Note: Melfi was deducted 2 point due to financial irregularities.)	38	12	14	12	43	44	−1	48	
10	Cosenza	38	9	17	12	37	39	−2	44	
11	Barletta (Note: Barletta was deducted 1 point and additional 5 points due to financial irregularities. At the end of season a phoenix was admitted to Eccellenza due to bankruptcy of the original club.) (E, R, R)	38	12	11	15	35	42	−7	41	Phoenix in Eccellenza
12	Lupa Roma	38	9	13	16	40	62	−22	40	
13	Martina Franca	38	9	11	18	34	42	−8	38	
14	Paganese	38	8	13	17	30	45	−15	37	
15	Messina (Note: Messina was readmitted to 2015–16 Lega Pro season on 1 September)	38	6	16	16	38	55	−17	34	
16	Aversa Normanna (Note: Aversa Normanna was deducted 1 point due to financial irregularities.) (R)	38	7	13	18	36	50	−14	33	Qualification to the relegation play-offs
17	Ischia (Note: Ischia was deducted 1 point due to financial irregularities.)	38	7	13	18	32	55	−23	33	Qualification to the relegation play-offs
18	Reggina (Note: Reggina was deducted 1 point due to financial irregularities. At the end of season a phoenix was admitted to Serie D due to bankruptcy of the original club.) (E, R)	38	8	9	21	33	59	−26	32	Phoenix in Serie D
19	Savoia (Note: Savoia was deducted 1 point and an additional 3 points due to financial irregularities. At the end of season a phoenix was admitted to Eccellenza due to bankruptcy of the original club) (R, E, R)	38	7	11	20	36	59	−23	28	Phoenix in Eccellenza
20	Vigor Lamezia (Note: Vigor Lamezia was placed last and relegated as punishment for match fixing) (D, R)	38	9	17	12	43	48	−5	44	Relegation to Serie D

Source: Datasport.it
(D) Disqualified; (E) Eliminated; (P) Promoted; (R) Relegated

== Promotion play-offs ==
Preliminary phase

16 May 2015
17:00

Benevento	1–2	Como
	Report (in Italian)

Stadio Ciro Vigorito, Benevento
17 May 2015
15:00

Bassano Virtus	1–1	Juve Stabia
Penalties
	5–4

Stadio Rino Mercante, Bassano del Grappa
17 May 2015
15:00

Ascoli	2–4 (a.e.t.)	Reggiana

Stadio Cino e Lillo Del Duca, Ascoli Piceno
17 May 2015
15:00

Matera	2–1 (a.e.t.)	Pavia

Stadio XXI Settembre, Matera

Final phase

Semifinals on 24 and 31 May 2015, finals on 7 and 14 June 2015.

Semifinals
4A	Como	1	1	2 (4)
3C	Matera	1	1	2 (2)
3B	Reggiana	0	1	1 (1)
2A	Bassano Virtus	0	1	1 (3)

Finals
4A	Como	2	0	2
2A	Bassano Virtus	0	0	0

Como promoted to Serie B.

== Relegation play-offs ==
First legs on 23 May 2015 (Reggina-Messina on 26 May), return legs on 30 May 2015.

Team 1	Agg.	Team 2	1st leg	2nd leg
Lumezzane	3-0	Pro Patria	1-0	2-0
Pordenone	3-8	Monza	0-2	3-6
Pro Piacenza	2-1	Forlì	2-1	0-0
Savona	3-2	Gubbio	2-1	1-1
Ischia	5-4	Aversa Normanna	4-1	1-3
Reggina	2-0	Messina	1-0	1-0

== Supercup ==
Squadra	P.ti	G	W	N	PL	GF	GS	GR
Novara	4	2	1	1	0	4	3	+1
Salernitana	3	2	1	0	1	5	4	+1
Teramo	1	2	0	1	1	2	4	-2
