= Castoria =

Castoria may refer to:

== Places and jurisdictions ==
- Kastoria, city in West Macedonia, Greece, also a Greek Orthodox Metropolitan see. Known as Castoria in Aromanian
- Kastoria (constituency), electoral district in West Macedonia, Greece
- Kastoria (regional unit), regional unit in West Macedonia, Greece
- Castoria (Latin see), city and bishopric in Graecia Secunda
- A previous name for French Camp, California

== Other ==
- Fletcher's Castoria, now known as Fletcher's Laxative, an oral syrup containing a stimulant laxative
- Castoria a genus name that contains a single species, the Serra do Mar grass mouse.

== See also ==
- Castorina, a surname
