= Alberto Bollini =

Italian football manager

Personal information
- Date of birth: 16 June 1966 (age 60)
- Place of birth: Poggio Rusco, Italy

Team information
- Current team: Italy U19 (Manager)

Managerial career
- Years: Team
- 1984–1987: Poggese
- 1988–1991: Massese
- 1992–1995: Crevalcore
- 1995–1998: Modena (youth)
- 1999–2003: Lazio (youth)
- 2003–2004: Igea Virtus
- 2004–2005: Valenzana
- 2006–2007: Sampdoria (youth)
- 2007–2009: Fiorentina (youth)
- 2010–2014: Lazio (youth)
- 2014: Lazio (assistant)
- 2015: Lecce
- 2015–2016: Atalanta (assistant)
- 2016–2017: Salernitana
- 2019: Modena
- 2019–2020: Italy U19
- 2020–2022: Italy U20
- 2022–2023: Italy U19
- 2023–: Italy (Assistant)

Alberto Bollini (born 16 June 1966) is an Italian football manager, who is in charge of the Italy national under-19 football team.

== Career ==
On 3 February 2015, he replaced Dino Pagliari as manager of Lecce.

From 2016 to 2017 he was in charge of Serie B side Salernitana.

In January 2019 he became manager of Serie D side Modena. He successively joined the coaching staff of the Italian Football Federation, being in charge of Italy U19 from 2019 to 2020, then the Italy U20 from 2020 to 2022. Bollini was successively re-named head coach of the Under-19 squad, which he led to triumph in the 2023 UEFA European Under-19 Championship.

== Honours ==
Italy U19

- UEFA European Under-19 Championship: 2023
