= Emanuele Ferraro =

Italian footballer (born 1978)

Personal information
- Date of birth: 8 September 1978 (age 48)
- Place of birth: Santa Teresa di Riva, Italy
- Height: 1.79 m (5 ft 10 1/2 in)
- Position: Forward

Youth career
- Brescia

Senior career*
Years	Team	Apps	(Gls)
1998–1999	FC Ospitaletto 2000	25	(1)
1999–2000	1. FC Magdeburg	7	(0)
2000–2001	Gubbio	23	(4)
2001–2002	Grosseto	24	(8)
2002–2003	USC Corigliano	33	(19)
2003–2005	Ascoli	6	(0)
2004	→ Vis Pesaro (loan)	10	(2)
2004–2005	→ Ancona (loan)	34	(14)
2005–2010	Salernitana	96	(27)
2008–2009	→ Piacenza (loan)	32	(7)
2010–2011	Taranto	21	(2)
2011	→ Paganese (loan)	14	(2)
2011	Messina	13	(2)
2011–2012	Ancona	15	(0)
Total		353	(88)

Managerial career
- 2012: Salernitana (youth)
- 2012–2013: Salernitana U19
- 2013: Gelbison
- 2015–2017: Salernitana (youth)
- 2017–2019: Salernitana U17
- 2019–2021: Cosenza U19
- 2021: FC Messina
- 2022: ASD Calcio Biancavilla 1990
- 2022–2023: Jonica FC
- 2025: Città di Sant'Agata
- 2025–2026: Athletic Palermo
- 2026–: Igea Virtus
- * Club domestic league appearances and goals

Emanuele Ferraro (born 8 September 1978) is an Italian football coach and former player. He is currently as a head coach for Italian Serie D club Igea Virtus.

== Playing career ==
=== Early career ===
Born in Santa Teresa di Riva, Sicily, Ferraro started his career with Lombardy club Brescia. After a Serie D season with Ospitaletto, which 10 km away from province capital Brescia, he left for German Fußball-Regionalliga club Magdeburg and played his first match on 11 August 1999.

In mid-2000, Ferraro returned to Italy and played a season for Serie C2 club Gubbio. In the next season, he left for the Serie D team Grosseto. He finished as the group F runner-up and was later admitted to Serie C2. In the 2002–03 season, he scored a career high of 19 league goals for Serie D team Corigliano.

=== Ascoli ===
In June 2003, he was signed by Serie B team Ascoli. Ferraro was lack of chance to play and left for Serie C1 club Vis Pesaro in January 2004. In June 2004, he was signed by Serie C2 club Ancona. Once again he scored a double figure for the team and the whole team only scored 34 goals.

At the start of 2005–06 Serie A season, Ferraro returned to Ascoli Piceno and played twice in 2005–06 Coppa Italia. However, he was not in Ascoli's Serie A plan.

=== Salernitana ===
In the last day of 2005 summer transfer window, he was signed by Serie C1 club Salernitana Calcio 1919 along with Gaetano Vastola, which the club was newly found to replace the bankrupt Serie B team Salernitana Sport. Ferraro gained a regular place in 2006–07 Serie C1 and scored a double figure again: 15 goals or 2/5 of the team. However, he played less regularly in the next season and scored 7 goals with the Serie C1 champion. He was the second striker of the team, behind Arturo Di Napoli.

On 1 September 2008, he was loaned to fellow Serie B side Piacenza. With the Emilia side, he partnered with Davide Moscardelli in 442 formation or on the bench when the coach use 433 formation. He scored 7 league goals, which is the second-best scorer behind Moscardelli (8 goals).

In the 2009–10 Serie B season, Ferraro returned to Salerno but only made 7 starts in Serie B.

=== Taranto ===
On 1 February 2010, he left the Serie B struggler and was signed by Lega Pro Prima Divisione team Taranto. In January 2011 he was loaned to Paganese.

=== Late career ===
In September 2011 he was signed by Serie D club A.C.R. Messina after he terminated his contract with Taranto.

== Coaching career ==
After retirement, Ferraro took on a coaching career, and was at the helm of Serie D club Gelbison in 2013; he successively went on to become a youth coach for Salernitana and Cosenza, leaving the latter role in March 2021. On 14 October 2021, he took over as the head coach of FC Messina in the Serie D league, following a dismal start in the season with four losses in five league games. He was released by FC Messina in December 2021 following the club's exclusion from the league.

== Honours ==
- Serie C1: 2008
