= Lucas Longoni =

Italian Argentine footballer

Personal information
- Date of birth: 30 June 1985 (age 41)
- Place of birth: Esperanza, Argentina
- Position: Forward

Team information
- Current team: Siracusa
- Number: 7

Senior career*
Years	Team	Apps	(Gls)
2006	Seregno	3	(0)
2006–2007	Saluzzo	13	(0)
2007	Savona	0	(0)
2007–2008	Aosta Valley	29	(14)
2008–2010	Arezzo	4	(0)
2009–2010	→ Catanzaro (loan)	32	(15)
2010–2011	Triestina	16	(0)
2011–2012	Siracusa	30	(7)
2013–2014	Vigor Lamezia	27	(4)
2014–2015	Akragas	13	(1)
2015–2017	Siracusa	40	(10)
- * Club domestic league appearances and goals as of 26 April 2015

Lucas Longoni (born 30 June 1985) is an Italian Argentine footballer who plays for Lega Pro club Siracusa.

== Biography ==
Born in Argentina with Italian descent, Longoni moved back to Italy to start his senior career. Longoni had played for 3 clubs in 2006–07 Serie D. In the 2007–08 season, he moved to Eccellenza club Aosta Valley. His goal scoring ability also made him earn a fully professional contract in 2008–09 Lega Pro Prima Divisione. However, Longoni only played 4 times for Arezzo in the third highest level of Italian football.

In 2009, Longoni moved down one level to 2009–10 Lega Pro Seconda Divisione club Catanzaro. Longoni once again found his goal-scoring shoes. He was the joint-second team scorer (14 goals along with Antonio Montella) behind Manolo Mosciaro (17 goals). In 2010, he moved to Triestina of 2010–11 Serie B on a free transfer (However, the club also paid Rexam Kft, a Hungarian company, for €450,000). The club had a deep financial crisis, but Longoni was neither a good signing. Longoni only played 16 times without a goal. Triestina was relegated at the end of the season.

In 2011, Longoni left for fellow third-tier club Siracusa. Longoni scored 7 goals in his second season in the third tier. However, the club also went bankrupt at the end of the season.

On 3 January 2013 Longoni was signed by fourth-tier club Vigor Lamezia.

For the 2013–2014 season, signing with Turris; in February 2014, he moved to the Vigor Lamezia. After remaining svincolanto accords, in December 2014, with the Akragas. In the summer of 2015, signing for Siracusa.
