= Nicola Mancino (footballer) =

Italian footballer

Personal information
- Date of birth: 8 March 1984 (age 42)
- Place of birth: Naples, Italy
- Height: 1.76 m (5 ft 9 in)
- Position: Midfielder

Team information
- Current team: Francavilla

Youth career
- –2002: Napoli

Senior career*
Years	Team	Apps	(Gls)
2002–2003	Napoli	2	(0)
2003	→ Latina (loan)	5	(0)
2003–2004	Teramo	28	(2)
2004–2005	Ternana	4	(0)
2005	→ Giugliano (loan)		
2006	Lucchese	1	(0)
2006–2007	Martina Franca	33	(4)
2008–2010	Foggia	66	(7)
2010–2011	Siracusa	25	(11)
2011–2013	Grosseto	35	(4)
2013–2015	Casertana	58	(17)
2015–2016	Ischia	11	(4)
2016	Rimini	12	(3)
2016–2017	Fidelis Andria	19	(1)
2017–2018	Siracusa	28	(2)
2018–2019	Casertana	18	(1)
2019–	Francavilla	17	(5)
- * Club domestic league appearances and goals as of 21:38, 25 February 2020 (UTC)

Nicola Mancino (born 8 March 1984) is an Italian football player. He plays for Francavilla.

== Club career ==
He made his Serie B debut for Napoli in the 2002–03 season.

On 17 September 2019 he signed with Serie D club Francavilla.
