= 2015 Italian football match-fixing scandal =

Match fixing

The 2015 Italian football scandal, or Dirty Soccer, was a scandal that involved rigged matches in 2014–15 season, involving Calcio Catania. The multimillion-dollar match-fixing scandal was suspected to be orchestrated by 'Ndrangheta, the most powerful mafia syndicate in Italy.

== Origins and etymology ==
The scandal first came to light as a consequence of investigations of prosecutors by the Italian football agency, Divisione Investigazioni Generali e Operazioni Speciali. On 19 May 2015, a total of 50 people were arrested in Italy on suspicion of match-fixing and 70 people being detained in total. The team that was under investigation was Catania, who fixed five matches so that they could remain in Serie B. On 23 June 2015, the team's president, Antonio Pulvirenti, and six others were arrested for match-fixing. Six days later, it was revealed that Pulvirenti "paid £71,000 to fix five matches".

On 14 July, the FIGC announced that next season's Serie B would be delayed for two weeks due to the ongoing match-fixing scandal against Catania.

== Club punishments ==
On 20 August 2015, the Italian Football Federation announced that Catania was relegated to the third tier with 12 points deducted in the Lega Pro and fined €150,000 fine, the worst punishment of any team involved. Two other teams, Savona and Torres, were relegated to Serie D for match-fixing. Teramo was also stripped of the 2014–15 Lega Pro championship and promotion to the 2015–16 Serie B.

== Sentences ==
=== Club ===
Name	Sentences (TFN)	Appeal	Final Appeal (TNAS)
Akragas	€2,500 fine		
Barletta	1-point deduction in the 2015–16 season		
Catania	Last place in 2014–15 Serie B (relegated), 12-point deduction in 2015–16 season and €150,000 fine		
L'Aquila	1-point deduction in the 2015–16 season		
Luparense San Paolo	1-point deduction in the 2015–16 season		
Savona	Last place in 2014–15 Lega Pro (relegated) and €300,000 fine		
Teramo	Stripped of promotion to 2015–16 Serie B and 2014–15 Lega Pro championship		
Torres	Last place in 2014–15 Lega Pro (relegated) and €300,000 fine		

=== People ===
Name	Sentences (TFN)	Appeal	Final Appeal (TNAS)
Antonino Pulvirenti (President of Catania)	5-year ban from football activities and €300,000 fine		
Pablo Gustavo Cosentino (CEO of Catania)	4-year ban from football activities and €50,000 fine		
Piero Di Luzio (employee of Genoa)	5-year ban from football activities and €150,000 fine		

== Other notes ==
The sentence was long disputed because of the severity of the punishment meted out to Catania compared to the other teams involved. According to the court, the conduct of team managers was considered in all cases. While not real match-fixing, it was a violation of sporting principles.

On 14 July, FIGC announced the next season's Serie B would be delayed for two weeks.
