= Stadio Giuseppe Domenico Tursi =

Stadium in Martina Franca, Italy

Coordinates: 40°41′59″N 17°20′36″E

- Interactive map of Stadio Giuseppe Domenico Tursi
- Location: Martina Franca, Italy
- Owner: Municipality of Martina Franca
- Capacity: 4,900
- Surface: Grass; 108x65m

Tenant
- A.C. Martina

Stadio Giuseppe Domenico Tursi is a multi-use stadium in Martina Franca, Italy. It is currently used mostly for football matches and is the home ground of A.C. Martina. The stadium holds 4,900.
