= Stadio Rino Mercante =

Stadium in Bassano del Grappa, Italy

- Interactive map of Stadio Rino Mercante
- Full name: Stadio Rino Mercante
- Location: Bassano del Grappa,
- Coordinates: 45°46′17″N 11°45′7″E
- Owner: Municipality of Bassano del Grappa
- Capacity: 2,952
- Surface: Pitch: grass; Cycling track: resin and cement
- Field size: 105 x 65 m

Tenant
- Bassano Virtus 55 S.T.

The Stadio Rino Mercante is a multi-use sports stadium in Bassano del Grappa, Italy. It is the home of Bassano Virtus 55 S.T. The stadium also has a cycling track, measuring 400 m (1,300 ft) and made of cement and resin. It hosted the UCI Track Cycling World Championships in 1985, the national track cycling championships on a number of occasions and in road bicycle racing, the finish of the Giro del Veneto from 1970 to 1980 and the finish of a stage of the Giro d'Italia in 1946, 1949, 1968, 1970 and 1974.

== See also ==
- List of cycling tracks and velodromes

Preceded by Velòdrom d'Horta; Barcelona	UCI Track Cycling World Championships; Venue; 1985	Succeeded by 7-Eleven USOTC Velodrome; Colorado Springs
