= Gianluca De Angelis (footballer, born 1981) =

Italian footballer

Personal information
- Date of birth: 23 May 1981 (age 45)
- Place of birth: Castellammare di Stabia, Italy
- Height: 1.76 m (5 ft 9 in)
- Position: Forward

Youth career
- Gragnano
- 1994–2000: Parma

Senior career*
Years	Team	Apps	(Gls)
1999–2002	Parma	1	(0)
2000–2001	→ Benevento (loan)	29	(4)
2001–2002	→ Sora (loan)	28	(4)
2002–2004	Verona	0	(0)
2003–2004	→ Torres (loan)	41	(6)
2005–2007	Gubbio	58	(16)
2007–2009	Melfi	82	(34)
2009–2010	Juve Stabia	33	(15)
2010–2011	Savona	14	(4)
2011–2013	Avellino	62	(23)
2013–2015	Cosenza	49	(15)
2015–2016	Casertana	33	(13)
2016–2017	Virtus Francavilla	17	(2)
2017	Melfi	15	(1)
2017–2018	Cavese	18	(3)
2018–2019	Sorrento	27	(5)
2019	Gragnano		
2019–2020	FC Sant'Agnello		
Total		507	(145)

International career
1996	Italy U16	6	(6)
1996–1997	Italy U17	9	(4)
2000–2001	Italy U20	5	(1)
- * Club domestic league appearances and goals

Gianluca De Angelis (born 23 May 1981) is an Italian former professional footballer who plays as a forward.

== Club career ==
=== Parma ===
Born in Castellammare di Stabia, in the Province of Naples, Campania region, De Angelis started his career at a local club in Gragnano, also in the Province of Naples. At age 13 he was signed by Parma, at that time famous for its youth products. At age 16 Angelis suffered an anterior cruciate ligament injury, but the injury did not end his career. He made his professional debut against S.S. Lazio on 23 May 1999 (the last round of the Serie A season as well as his birthday, by the decision of Malesani), year in which his team won 1998–99 UEFA Cup and 1998–99 Coppa Italia. He then played almost all of his career in Italian Serie C1, Serie C2 and their successor.

De Angelis left the reserve team of Parma in 2000 for Serie C1 club Benevento. In 2001, he was signed by another third division club Sora.

=== Verona ===
De Angelis was signed by Serie B club Hellas Verona F.C. in June 2002 in co-ownership deal. The club also signed Anthony Šerić outright from Parma; Verona sold Alberto Gilardino outright and Adrian Mutu in temporary deal to Parma. De Angelis played once in 2002–03 Coppa Italia, which also coached by former Parma coach Malesani. He wore no.23 shirt for the first team.

On 8 January 2003 De Angelis left for Serie C1 club Sassari Torres. In June 2003 De Angelis joined Verona outright. In July 2003 Verona also signed Florian Myrtaj from Parma to compensate debt. The temporary deal with Torres was renewed in July 2003. De Angelis received no.31 shirt for Verona in 2004–05 Serie B. However, he did not play any competitive game. He played once in friendly match as well as received a call-up against Como in 2004–05 Coppa Italia. He was not included in the last 18 squad.

=== Serie C career ===
In January 2005 De Angelis was signed by Serie C2 club Gubbio. De Angelis made his debut on 6 January 2005, against Sansovino.

In January 2007 he left for Melfi. In 2008–09 he won the title of topscorer of Lega Pro Seconda Divisione (ex–Serie C2).

In July 2009 he was signed by hometown club Juve Stabia. He was the team topscorer with 15 goals in the league, ahead Maurizio Peluso (12 goals) and Jesus Sebastian Vicentin (11 goals). The club promoted to Lega Pro Prima Divisione (ex–Serie C1) as the Group C champions. The club finished as the runner-up of 2010 Supercoppa di Lega di Seconda Divisione, losing to Lucchese, champions of Group B. In August 2010 he was signed by Savona of Seconda Divisione.

==== Avellino ====
From January 2011 to 2013 he played with Avellino in Seconda Divisione (January–June 2011) and Prima Divisione (2011–13). Avellino promoted to Serie B in 2013.

Avellino also signed Peluso on 31 January 2011 and Vicentin in 2010. However, only De Angelis remained in Avellino for 2011–12 season. De Angelis scored 8 goals in second half of 2010–11 season, as well as 8 goals in 2011–12 season, ahead forwards Mame Baba Thiam (4 goals) and Fabrizio Lasagna (2 goals) but behind Gianmarco Zigoni (11 goals).

==== Cosenza ====
On 30 August 2013 he was transferred back to Seconda Divisione for Cosenza. The club was admitted to professional league to fill the 7 vacancies on 5 August (It made 13 teams promoted from 2012–13 Serie D (originally 9 teams) and 2 teams not relegated from 2012–13 Lega Pro Seconda Divisione, plus Sambenedettese not promoted). Despite it also saw Lega Pro (ex–Serie C) would reduced from two divisions to one, as well as 69 teams to 60 teams in 2014, thus 18 teams (increased from 9 teams) would be relegated to 2014–15 Serie D. Cosenza secured the qualification to 2014–15 Serie C after the round 30. De Angelis also scored 11 goals as team topscorer of the season. Eventually Cosenza was the fourth of Group B.

==== Casertana ====
De Angelis was signed by Casertana on 13 July 2015 in a 1-year contract.

=== Sorrento ===
De Angelis joined Sorrento in the Serie D on 22 July 2018.

=== Later career ===
On 10 August 2019, De Angelis joined A.S.D. Gragnano Calcio. He left the club in December 2019, and joined FC Sant'Agnello.

== International career ==
De Angelis was a player for Italy U15 team in 1995–96 season. (now equivalent to Italy U16) He was a player for U16 (now equivalent to Italy U17) in 1997 UEFA European Under-16 Championship, which he played 3 games in qualification and 2 games in the group stage. Italy used a mixed 1980 and 1981 born players for the tournament, such as captain Bonomi and Blasi, which De Angelis was partnered with Gabriele Capuano in the starting lineup. However De Angelis was replaced by Davide Sinigaglia at the 50th and 41st minute respectively.

== Honours ==
- UEFA Cup: 1999 (Parma)
- Coppa Italia: 1999 (Parma)
- Supercoppa di Lega di Prima Divisione: 2013 (Avellino)
- Lega Pro Prima Divisione: 2013 (Avellino)
- Lega Pro Seconda Divisione: 2010 (Juve Stabia)

== Personal life ==
De Angelis is married and has two children. (as of November 2013)
