= Gianpaolo Castorina =

Italian footballer and coach

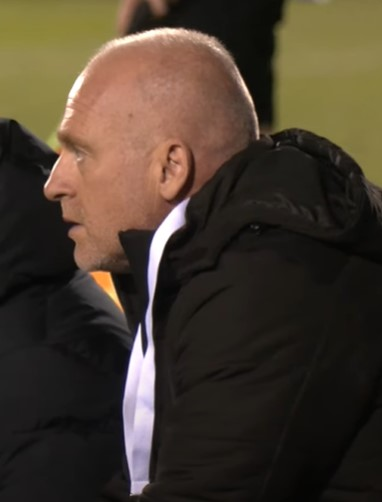

Personal information
- Date of birth: 30 August 1976 (age 50)
- Place of birth: Milan, Italy
- Height: 1.77 m (5 ft 10 in)
- Position: Defender

Team information
- Current team: PAOK (Assistant Coach)

Youth career
- 1992: Como
- 1994: Milan

Senior career*
Years	Team	Apps	(Gls)
1995–1996	Lodigiani	19	(1)
1996–1997	Ancona	32	(0)
1997–2002	Monza	120	(0)
2000	Siena	10	(0)
2002–2003	Arezzo	24	(0)
2003–2004	Carrarese	25	(0)
2004–2005	Ancona	31	(0)
2005	Südtirol	3	(0)
2006	Nocerina	6	(0)
2006–2007	Forte dei Marmi	30	(0)
2007–2010	Virtus Entella		

International career
1992	Italy U-15	6	(0)
1992	Italy U-16	6	(0)
1994	Italy U-18	1	(0)

Managerial career
- 2010–2011: Virtus Entella (Assistant)
- 2011–2020: Virtus Entella (Youth Manager)
- 2021–2022: PAOK (Assistant)
- 2022–2023: Parma (Youth Manager)
- 2023–: PAOK (Assistant)
- * Club domestic league appearances and goals

Gianpaolo Castorina (born 30 August 1976) is a retired Italian professional footballer turned coach.and 2023– Assistant Coach at PAOK

== Playing career ==
Castorina played in the Serie B for several seasons, reaching the peak of his playing career with Monza and Siena. He retired in 2010 after three years with Virtus Entella.

== Coaching career ==
After his retirement, he switched into a coaching staff role at Virtus Entella, serving as first team assistant and successively as youth coach. Under his guidance, the Primavera Under-19 team managed to reach the final of the Coppa Italia Primavera 2017, then lost to Roma 3–1 on aggregate.

On 30 April 2017, Castorina was promoted to the first team head coaching role until the end of the season after Roberto Breda's dismissal following three consecutive losses in the Serie B league which led Virtus Entella out of the promotion playoff zone. On 31 May 2017, Virtus Entella announced Castorina will serve as permanent head coach for the 2017–18 Serie B season. He was dismissed on 5 November 2017, due to poor results, and replaced by Alfredo Aglietti.

After his dismissal, he returned at Virtus Entella in 2018 as a youth coach, winning the Campionato Nazionale Dante Berretti title in 2019. He left the club in May 2020, ending a thirteen-year tenure with the Ligurian club.
