= Riccardo Ragni =

Italian footballer (born 1991)

Personal information
- Date of birth: 23 June 1991 (age 35)
- Place of birth: San Benedetto del Tronto, Italy
- Height: 1.88 m (6 ft 2 in)
- Position: Goalkeeper

Senior career*
| Years | Team | Apps | (Gls) |
| 2007–2009 | Mosciano | | |
| 2009–2011 | Pescara | 0 | (0) |
| 2010 | → Chieti (loan) | 9 | (0) |
| 2010–2011 | → Ebolitana (loan) | 35 | (0) |
| 2011–2012 | Andria | 7 | (0) |
| 2012 | → Pescara (loan) | 2 | (0) |
| 2012–2014 | Pescara | 0 | (0) |
| 2012–2013 | → Nocerina (loan) | 1 | (0) |
| 2013–2014 | → Aprilia (loan) | 18 | (0) |
| 2014–2015 | Ascoli | 2 | (0) |
| 2015–2018 | Ascoli | 4 | (0) |
| 2018 | Alessandria | 1 | (0) |
| 2019-2022 | Mosciano | ? | (?) |
| 2022-2023 | Favale 1980 | ? | (?) |
| 2023 | Real Vomano | ? | (?) |
| 2023-2024 | Favale 1980 | ? | (?) |
- * Club domestic league appearances and goals as of 1st July 2024

Riccardo Ragni (born 23 June 1991) is an Italian footballer who plays as a goalkeeper.

== Club career ==
Ragni started his career at amateur side Mosciano, in Mosciano Sant'Angelo, Abruzzo region. In 2009, he joined the under-20 team of Abruzzese club Pescara but in January 2010, after making no appearances, was loaned out to Chieti of Serie D. In the 2010–11 Serie D season he was on loan to Ebolitana.

After 1 1/2 seasons, Ragni became a borderline member of the first team of Pescara, where he wore the no.76 shirt in pre-season of 2011.

On 6 August 2011, his employment contract was sold to Andria on a co-ownership deal for €70,000, but on 31 January 2012 returned to Pescara on a temporary deal and in August in a definitive deal for €37,500 fee, signing a 2-year contract. Ragni was immediately loaned to Nocerina.

Ragni received pre-season call-up from Pescara on 9 July 2013. However, he was loaned to Aprilia before round 1.

On 21 August 2014, Ragni signed an initial 1-year contract with Ascoli.

Ragni remained in his home province club for 3 1/2 seasons, renewing his contract at the start of each season.

On 30 January 2018, Ragni left for Alessandria until the end of the season, then with Michael Agazzi moved to Ascoli. Ragni was assigned the number 22 shirt. Ragni made one league appearance for his new club before being released by the club on 30 June 2018.

He remained without a club before moving to Mosciano in the 19/20 season, before leaving on a free transfer for Favale 1980 in 2022. In 2023 Ragni left for Real Vamano before returning to Favale 1980 in December of the same year. As of 2024, Riccardo Ragni is without a club.
