= ASD Penne Calcio =

Italian football club

A.S.D. Penne Calcio
- Full name: Associazione Sportiva Dilettantistica Penne Calcio
- Nicknames: Biancorossi (White and reds)
- Founded: 1920
- Ground: Stadio Comunale, Penne, Italy
- Capacity: 1,000
- Chairman: Pasquale Almonti
- League: Eccellenza
- 2015–2016: Promozione, 1st
Home colours	Away colours

A.S.D. Penne Calcio is an Italian association football club located in Penne, Abruzzo. They currently play in the Italian Eccellenza.
