= ASD Nuova Igea Virtus =

Italian football club

Igea 1946
- Full name: Associazione Sportiva Dilettantistica; Nuova Igea Virtus
- Founded: 1946; 1964 (refounded); 2011 (refounded); 2019 (refounded)
- Ground: Stadio Carlo D'Alcontres, Barcellona Pozzo di Gotto, Italy
- Capacity: 7,000
- Chairman: Massimo Italiano
- Manager: Emanuele Ferraro
- League: Serie D
- 2025–26: Serie D/I, 6th
Home colours	Away colours

Associazione Sportiva Dilettantistica Nuova Igea Virtus is an Italian association football club, based in Barcellona Pozzo di Gotto, Sicily. Currently it plays in Serie D.

== History ==
=== From Igea Virtus to F.C. Igea Virtus Barcellona ===
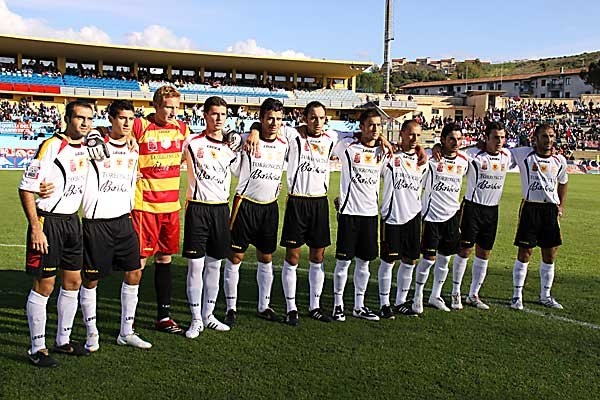
An Igea Virtus' lineup in 2008–09

The club was founded in 1946 as Igea Virtus and refounded in 1964 as Associazione Sportiva Nuova Igea, and changed to Football Club Igea Virtus Barcellona in 1993 after the merger with Barcellona.

In July 2010 the club folded after the relegation from Lega Pro Seconda Divisione.

=== A.S.D. Igea Virtus Barcellona ===
In the summer of 2011, the club was refounded as Associazione Sportiva Dilettantistica Igea Virtus Barcellona after the merger between the teams of Giovanile Calcio Igea and that of Taormina Trappitello (acquiring its sports title of Prima Categoria Sicily) getting the immediate promotion to Promozione Sicily. The club also won the Coppa Sicily of Prima Categoria.

=== 2019 refoundation ===
After the folding of the original club in 2019, it was refounded once again, through a relocation from nearby Terme Vigliatore of a Promozione team to Barcellona, under the new denomination of A.S.D. Igea 1946. Under this new structure, the club was promoted back to Eccellenza in 2020. After changing its denomination to A.S.D. Nuova Igea Virtus, the club won promotion to Serie D in 2023.

== Colors and badge ==
The team's colors are yellow and red.

== Stadium ==
The club, more predominantly known as Igea or Barcellona, plays at the Stadio Carlo D'Alcontres.
