= SSD Martina Calcio 1947 =

Association football club in Italy

Martina
- Full name: Società Sportiva Dilettantistica Martina Calcio 1947
- Nicknames: Biancazzurri (The White & Sky Blues), Itriani (The Itrians)
- Founded: 5 January 1947; 79 years ago as Associazione Sportiva Martina; 2008 (refounded); 2016 (refounded)
- Ground: Stadio Giuseppe Domenico Tursi
- Capacity: 4,900
- Manager: Piero Lacarbonara
- Coach: Giuseppe Laterza
- League: Serie D Group H
- 2023–24: Serie D Group H, 2th of 18
- Website: www.martinacalcio.it
Home colours	Away colours

Società Sportiva Dilettantistica Martina Calcio 1947, commonly known as Martina Calcio or Martina (pronounced [marˈtiːna]), is an Italian football club based in Martina Franca, Apulia, who compete in Serie D, the fourth tier of the Italian football league system.

Founded in 1947 as Associazione Sportiva Martina, the club was refounded two times: in 2008 and in 2016.

== History ==
A.S. Martina was founded on 5 January 1947, by Giuseppe Domenico Tursi, a trailblazer for football in Martina Franca. Tursi built the town's first football pitch and served as both coach and club director, supported by local figures including lawyer Giovanni Serio, then-mayor Motolese, and Pierino Marinosci. The club played its first official match on 24 November, drawing 1–1 against Grottaglie. Campobasso scored the historic first goal for Martina in the 44th minute, converting a penalty.

After competing in local tournaments, Martina entered the regional Prima Divisione in the 1947–48 season. The club adopted white and sky blue as its official colors and chose a rearing horse as its symbol—a nod to its fighting spirit.

For many years, Martina remained in the lower leagues. In 1970, under president Benito Semeraro, the team achieved its first professional promotion by winning the Serie D title. That season was highlighted by player-coach Biagio Catalano, goalkeeper De Iaco and nd a young Mario Laudisa, who would go on to become a club legend with 426 appearances.

The club held its own the following year, finishing 11th, but suffered relegation in 1972. What followed was a period of ups and downs: a drop to Promozione in 1974–75, then a quick return to Serie D.

In 1980, Martina earned promotion to Serie C2 after a dramatic penalty shootout win against Pro Vasto in a playoff held in Nocera Inferiore. The club's momentum continued into the 1985–86 season, when it secured promotion to Serie C1 after a six-match winning streak to open the campaign and clinched the title with five games to spare. This success came just a year after the club had narrowly managed to register in time and entrusted the team to manager Ambrogio Pelagalli.

Martina's stint in Serie C1 was brief, lasting only a season. The club soon entered a period of decline, spending four years in Serie C2 before being relegated to the Campionato Interregionale in 1991, and again to Eccellenza in 1995.

A swift return to Serie D followed in 1996. In 1998, the club officially rebranded as Associazione Calcio Martina 1947. Later that year, a new ownership group led by Gianfranco Giovanni Chiarelli, with financial backing from Lino Cassano, took charge of the club.

After two mixed seasons in Serie D, Martina, now coached by Luigi Boccolini, dominated the 2000–2001 season, finishing ahead of Frosinone and earning promotion. The success didn't stop there. In 2001–02, Martina climbed to Serie C1, returning after 15 years, and in their first season back, nearly earned promotion to Serie B, falling just short in the playoff final against Pescara.

In 2006, Martina had a high-profile moment when it faced Juventus in the Coppa Italia. Juventus, recently relegated to Serie B due to the Calciopoli scandal, won 3–0 in the first round.

However, by 2008, following relegation from Serie C1 to C2, the club was unable to register for the new season due to financial troubles. All players were released.

Following the dissolution of A.C. Martina in 2008, a phoenix club named A.S.D. Martina Franca was established during the same transfer window. The new club was admitted to the Prima Categoria Apulia division.

Martina finished second in the 2008–09 season and earned promotion to Promozione Apulia. The following year, they won the Promozione playoffs and secured another promotion to Eccellenza Apulia for the 2010–11 season. During that time, the club was approached by Ostuni Calcio 24, a Serie D side, with a proposal to swap sports titles—a move that would have effectively granted a double promotion. Although the idea was initially considered, the club ultimately declined and chose to earn promotion on the field.

In the 2010–11 season, after a dramatic promotion playoff that extended into extra time against Audace Cerignola, Martina clinched promotion to Serie D. Their momentum continued, and in the 2011–12 season, Martina Franca won promotion to Lega Pro Seconda Divisione, marking an extraordinary return to professional football—achieving four consecutive promotions in just four years.

In 2013–14, the club was relegated back to Serie D after finishing 13th in Lega Pro Seconda Divisione. However, due to a vacancy in the league, Martina was readmitted to Lega Pro for the 2014–15 season.

In 2016, the club once again faced financial challenges and failed to register for the professional league. As a result, all players were released, and the team ceased operations. Yet again, football in Martina Franca found a way to continue. On 8 September 2016, another phoenix club was born: A.S.D. Martina Calcio 1947. The new team was admitted to Prima Categoria Apulia, signaling a fresh start and a renewed commitment to restoring Martina's proud football tradition.

== Colors and badge ==
The old crest of A.S. Martina Franca 1947

The team's colors are blue and white.
