= 2009–10 Serie B =

Italian football league season

Serie B TIM
- Season: 2009–10
- Champions: Lecce (1st title)
- Promoted: Lecce; Cesena; Brescia (by Play-off)
- Relegated: Salernitana; Gallipoli (bankruptcy); Mantova (bankruptcy); Ancona (bankruptcy)
- Matches: 462
- Goals: 1,146 (2.48 per match)
- Top goalscorer: Éder (26 goals)
- Biggest home win: Cittadella 6–0 Mantova
- Biggest away win: Gallipoli 0–5 Vicenza

The 2009–10 Serie B season is the seventy-eighth edition since its establishment in 1929. Serie B is the second-highest division in the Italian football league system after the Serie A. It is contested by 22 teams and organized by the Lega Calcio.

A total of 22 teams contest the league, 15 of which returned from the 2008–09 season, four of which have been promoted from Lega Pro Prima Divisione, and three relegated from Serie A.

== Teams ==
Location of (qualified) teams in Serie B 2009–10

=== Stadiums and locations ===
Club	City	Stadium	Capacity	2008–09 season
AlbinoLeffe	Albino and Leffe (playing in Bergamo)	Atleti Azzurri d'Italia	26,393	9th in Serie B
Ancona	Ancona	del Conero	26,000	19th in Serie B
Ascoli	Ascoli Piceno	Cino e Lillo Del Duca	20,000	16th in Serie B
Brescia	Brescia	Mario Rigamonti	27,547	4th in Serie B
Cesena	Cesena	Dino Manuzzi	23,860	Lega Pro Prima Divisione – A Champions
Cittadella	Cittadella	Pier Cesare Tombolato	7,623	17th in Serie B
Crotone	Crotone	Ezio Scida	9,631	Lega Pro Prima Divisione – B Playoff Winners
Empoli	Empoli	Carlo Castellani	19,795	5th in Serie B
Frosinone	Frosinone	Matusa	9,680	11th in Serie B
Gallipoli	Gallipoli (playing in Lecce)	Via del Mare	33,876	Lega Pro Prima Divisione – B Champions
Grosseto	Grosseto	Carlo Zecchini	9,909	6th in Serie B
Lecce	Lecce	Via del Mare	33,876	20th in Serie A
Mantova	Mantua	Danilo Martelli	14,844	13th in Serie B
Modena	Modena	Alberto Braglia	20,507	15th in Serie B
Padova	Padua	Euganeo	32,336	Lega Pro Prima Divisione – A Playoff Winners
Piacenza	Piacenza	Leonardo Garilli	21,668	10th in Serie B
Reggina	Reggio Calabria	Oreste Granillo	27,454	19th in Serie A
Salernitana	Salerno	Arechi	37,245	14th in Serie B
Sassuolo	Sassuolo (playing in Modena)	Alberto Braglia	20,507	7th in Serie B
Torino	Turin	Olimpico di Torino	27,994	18th in Serie A
Triestina	Trieste	Nereo Rocco	32,454	8th in Serie B
Vicenza	Vicenza	Romeo Menti	17,163	12th in Serie B

=== Personnel and kits ===
Team	President	Manager	Kit manufacturer	Shirt sponsor
AlbinoLeffe	(Italy) Gianfranco Andreoletti	(Italy) Emiliano Mondonico	Acerbis	UBI Assicurazioni, Studio Casa Agenzie Immobiliari
Ancona	(Italy) Flavio Mais	(Italy) Sandro Salvioni	Legea	Kerself (1) / Twice SIM (2, 7-8, 10, 12, 14, 17) / H6 (3, 9) / RSM Italy (4) / Kinexia (5) / University.it (6) / Fisioclub Ancona (11) / Ecoware (13) / Società Italiana Sviluppo & Impresa (15) / Sartoria Paolorossi (16) / Centro Carni Villa Musone (18, 20, 26, 42) / Impero (21) / La Stafferia (22) / Brainspark Investment Group (29-30) / Dentro e Fuori Service (31) / La Cantina di Palazzo Bello (33, 35, 39) / La Gramigna Srl (34) / Radio Tua (38), Maracanà Sport Store (31)
Ascoli	(Italy) Roberto Benigni	(Italy) Giuseppe Pillon	Legea	Carisap, CIAM
Brescia	(Italy) Gino Corioni	(Italy) Giuseppe Iachini	Mass	UBI Banco di Brescia, Bresciani Cover All
Cesena	(Italy) Igor Campedelli	(Italy) Pierpaolo Bisoli	Lotto	Phytum Ton
Cittadella	(Italy) Andrea Gabrielli	(Italy) Claudio Foscarini	Garman	Siderurgica Gabrielli
Crotone	(Italy) Salvatore Gualtieri	(Italy) Franco Lerda	Zeus	Città di Crotone, Ceramica Gres 2000
Empoli	(Italy) Fabrizio Corsi	(Italy) Salvatore Campilongo	Asics	Limonta Sport, Computer Gross
Frosinone	(Italy) Maurizio Stirpe	(Italy) Guido Carboni	Legea	Banca Popolare del Frusinate, Provincia di Frosinone
Gallipoli	(Italy) Daniele D'Odorico	(Italy) Ezio Rossi	Garman	D'Odorico Group/Caroli Hotels, Italcantieri
Grosseto	(Italy) Piero Camilli	(Italy) Maurizio Sarri	Erreà	Industria Lavorazione Carni Ovine, Banca della Maremma
Lecce	(Italy) Giovanni Semeraro	(Italy) Luigi De Canio	Asics	HAITI - SMS 48541/Better, Lachifarma
Mantova	(Italy) Fabrizio Lori	(Italy) Michele Serena	Joma	Nuova Pansac
Modena	(Italy) Alfredo Amadei	(Italy) Luigi Apolloni	Givova	CPL Concordia, Immergas
Padova	(Italy) Marcello Cestaro	(Italy) Carlo Sabatini	Lotto	Famila, Cassa di Risparmio del Veneto
Piacenza	(Italy) Fabrizio Garilli	(Italy) Massimo Ficcadenti	Macron	UNICEF
Reggina	(Italy) Pasquale Foti	(Italy) Roberto Breda	Onze	Stocco&Stocco/Guglielmo Caffè/Ipac/La Gru, Stocco&Stocco
Salernitana	(Italy) Antonio Lombardi	(Italy) Ersilio Cerone	Givova	Lombardi Costruzioni
Sassuolo	(Italy) Carlo Rossi	(Italy) Stefano Pioli	Sportika	Mapei
Torino	(Italy) Urbano Cairo	(Italy) Stefano Colantuono	Kappa	MG.K VIS/Il Buon Riso/Il Buon Riso Firma/Italporte/Dolmar Makita/Maniva Oligominerale/Škoda Yeti/Be-Total/Stylo Rent a Car, Dahlia TV
Triestina	(Italy) Stefano Fantinel	(Italy) Daniele Arrigoni	Mass	Fantinel, Testa & Molinaro
Vicenza	(Italy) (Egypt) Sergio Cassingena	(Italy) Rolando Maran	Max Sport	FIAMM

== Managerial changes ==
=== Before the start of the season ===
Team	Outgoing manager	Manner of departure	Date of vacancy	Replaced by	Date of appointment
Ascoli	Franco Colomba	Contract expired	4 June 2009	Alessandro Pane	17 June 2009
Vicenza	Angelo Gregucci	Contract expired	5 June 2009	Rolando Maran	16 June 2009
Piacenza	Stefano Pioli	Contract expired	5 June 2009	Fabrizio Castori	2 July 2009
Sassuolo	Andrea Mandorlini	Mutual consent	10 June 2009	Stefano Pioli	12 June 2009
Reggina	Nevio Orlandi	Contract expired	11 June 2009	Walter Novellino	11 June 2009
Triestina	Rolando Maran	Mutual consent	15 June 2009	Luca Gotti	25 June 2009
Torino	Giancarlo Camolese	Contract expired	15 June 2009	Stefano Colantuono	15 June 2009
Empoli	Silvio Baldini	Sacked	16 June 2009	Salvatore Campilongo	16 June 2009
Gallipoli	Giuseppe Giannini	Mutual consent	16 June 2009	Giuseppe Giannini	13 August 2009
Mantova	Mario Somma	Contract expired	17 June 2009	Michele Serena	17 June 2009
Crotone	Francesco Moriero	Mutual consent	22 June 2009	Franco Lerda	27 June 2009
Frosinone	Piero Braglia	Contract expired	24 June 2009	Francesco Moriero	24 June 2009

=== During the season ===
Team	Outgoing manager	Manner of departure	Date of vacancy	Replaced by	Date of appointment
Salernitana	Fabio Brini	Sacked	19 September 2009	Marco Cari	19 September 2009
AlbinoLeffe	Armando Madonna	Sacked	28 September 2009	Emiliano Mondonico	28 September 2009
Brescia	Alberto Cavasin	Sacked	4 October 2009	Giuseppe Iachini	4 October 2009
Triestina	Luca Gotti	Sacked	6 October 2009	Mario Somma	6 October 2009
Reggina	Walter Novellino	Sacked	24 October 2009	Ivo Iaconi	24 October 2009
Salernitana	Marco Cari	Sacked	2 November 2009	Gianluca Grassadonia	2 November 2009
Piacenza	Fabrizio Castori	Sacked	10 November 2009	Massimo Ficcadenti	11 November 2009
Ascoli	Alessandro Pane	Sacked	22 November 2009	Giuseppe Pillon	22 November 2009
Torino	Stefano Colantuono	Sacked	29 November 2009	Mario Beretta	29 November 2009
Torino	Mario Beretta	Sacked	10 January 2010	Stefano Colantuono	10 January 2010
Reggina	Ivo Iaconi	Sacked	8 February 2010	Roberto Breda	8 February 2010
Padova	Carlo Sabatini	Sacked	8 February 2010	Nello Di Costanzo	9 February 2010
Triestina	Mario Somma	Sacked	9 February 2010	Daniele Arrigoni	10 February 2010
Salernitana	Gianluca Grassadonia	Removed from managerial duties	14 March 2010	Ersilio Cerone	14 March 2010
Gallipoli	Giuseppe Giannini	Resigned	22 March 2010	Giovanni Di Pasquale (caretaker)	22 March 2010
Grosseto	Elio Gustinetti	Sacked	24 March 2010	Maurizio Sarri	24 March 2010
Vicenza	Rolando Maran	Sacked	28 March 2010	Nedo Sonetti	28 March 2010
Gallipoli	Giovanni Di Pasquale	End of caretaker spell	30 March 2010	Ezio Rossi	30 March 2010
Padova	Nello Di Costanzo	Sacked	10 April 2010	Carlo Sabatini	10 April 2010
Vicenza	Nedo Sonetti	Sacked	15 April 2010	Rolando Maran	15 April 2010
Frosinone	Francesco Moriero	Sacked	25 April 2010	Guido Carboni	25 April 2010

- ^1 Giuseppe Giannini left Gallipoli by mutual consent in June 2009, only three weeks after having won promotion to Serie B with the club, due to uncertainty regarding the club future. He successively agreed to return at Gallipoli two months later, and only ten days before the season kick-off, after Udine-based D'Odorico Group completed the club takeover. During the time Giannini did not act as head coach, no replacement was appointed.
- ^2 Salernitana under-19 coach Gianluca Grassadonia was appointed to replace Marco Cari in November 2009 despite not having the required coaching badges. In December, Ersilio Cerone was appointed "official" head coach to fulfil the requirement for a UEFA A coaching graduate, with Grassadonia appearing as assistant but being usually referred as the "real" manager. Grassadonia was later announced to have been removed from the first team coaching staff on March 14, 2010, whereas Cerone was confirmed as head coach, this time on a real basis.

The list does not include Giuseppe Giannini's resignation from Gallipoli, who were announced on February 8, 2010 and withdrawn two days later following a meeting with club chairman Daniele D'Odorico.

== Events ==
The 2009–10 Serie B season will feature the return of seven-times Italian champions Torino, who were relegated from Serie A. Other teams relegated from the top flight include Reggina (after seven consecutive seasons in the Serie A) and Lecce (after only one season in the highest tier).

Four teams were promoted from Lega Pro Prima Divisione: Cesena, Crotone, Padova and newcomers Gallipoli. As of 10 August, Gallipoli did not manage to organize a squad for the league and were even without a head coach due to club issues (the club chairman being in talks with several third parties regarding a possible takeover); this also forced the club to play the Under-19 team for the second round of the Coppa Italia tournament, lost 6–1 to lower league outfit Lumezzane. The following day, Giuseppe Giannini returned to coach Gallipoli after a company from Udine took over the club.

On 23 September 2009, the Football League committee point deductions of respectively two and one points for clubs Crotone and Gallipoli due to administrative and financial breaches. The one point deduction for Gallipoli was later canceled by the Federal Court of Justice on October 22, with the two-point penalty regarding Crotone being instead confirmed.

An analogous one-point penalty involving Ancona was ratified by the National Disciplinary Committee on 18 February 2010 due to not having paid a number of salaries in June and July 2009; such deduction was extended to two points by the Federal Court of Justice later on 12 March.

The season also experienced a suspension for the 3 March match between Cesena and Sassuolo, which was not completed due to heavy snow at the 73rd minute, with the result being 0–0. As per Italian league rules, only the remaining 17 minutes were played, and an unusual mini-game was therefore rescheduled on 16 March during which Sassuolo managed to score a goal (at the second minute of the match replay) to record a 1–0 win.

Later, on 19 March, Salernitana were docked six points due to matchfixing regarding a Serie C1 league game held in April 2008 against Potenza. Salernitana were also the first team to get mathematically relegated, after a 5–2 loss to Empoli left the Campanian club with a 23-point gap between them and 19th-placed Padova with seven games to the end of the season.

== League table ==
Pos	Team	Pld	W	D	L	GF	GA	GD	Pts	Promotion or relegation
1	Lecce (C, P)	42	20	15	7	66	47	+19	75	Promotion to Serie A
2	Cesena (P)	42	20	14	8	55	29	+26	74	Promotion to Serie A
3	Brescia (O, P)	42	21	9	12	60	44	+16	72	Qualification to play-offs
4	Sassuolo	42	18	15	9	60	42	+18	69	Qualification to play-offs
5	Torino	42	19	11	12	53	36	+17	68	Qualification to play-offs
6	Cittadella	42	18	12	12	62	43	+19	66	Qualification to play-offs
7	Grosseto	42	14	19	9	66	63	+3	61	
8	Crotone (Note: 2 points deducted due to financial irregularities.)	42	17	11	14	53	50	+3	60	
9	Ascoli	42	15	12	15	57	57	0	57	
10	Empoli	42	15	11	16	66	56	+10	56	
11	AlbinoLeffe	42	14	13	15	59	56	+3	55	
12	Modena	42	14	12	16	39	47	−8	54 (Note: MOD 1–0 REG; REG 0–1 MOD)	
13	Reggina	42	15	9	18	51	56	−5	54	
14	Vicenza	42	12	17	13	40	41	−1	53 (Note: VIC: 8 pts 4–1; PIA: 5 pts 4–5; FRO: 3 pts 4–6)	
15	Piacenza	42	13	14	15	40	45	−5	53	
16	Frosinone	42	15	8	19	50	67	−17	53	
17	Ancona (Note: 2 points deducted due to financial irregularities. Ancona was excluded from football by Federal Council's decision. Later an Eccellenza club claimed its heritage as US Ancona 1905. As a consequence, Triestina as losing sides of the relegation play-off were spared from relegation.) (E, R, R, R)	42	15	9	18	55	56	−1	52	Claiming club in Eccellenza
18	Triestina (T)	42	13	12	17	41	51	−10	51 (Note: PAD 0–0 TRI; TRI 2–1 PAD)	Relegation play-off (annulled)
19	Padova	42	12	15	15	44	48	−4	51	Relegation play-off (annulled)
20	Mantova (Note: Mantova went bankrupt after its relegation at the end of the season.) (R, E, R)	42	10	18	14	46	58	−12	48	Phoenix in Serie D
21	Gallipoli (Note: Gallipoli went bankrupt after its relegation at the end of the season.) (R, E, R, R, R)	42	10	10	22	43	74	−31	40	Phoenix in Promozione
22	Salernitana (Note: 6 points deducted due to match-fixing during the 2007–08 Serie C1 season.) (R)	42	5	8	29	40	80	−40	17	Relegation to Prima Divisione

Source: http://www.gazzetta.it/speciali/risultati_classifiche/2010/calcio/serieb/index.shtml
Rules for classification: 1) points; 2) goal difference; 3) number of goals scored.
(C) Champions; (E) Eliminated; (O) Play-off winners; (P) Promoted; (R) Relegated; (T) Qualified, but not yet for the particular phase indicated

== Results ==
Home \ Away	ALB	ANC	ASC	BRE	CES	CIT	CRO	EMP	FRO	GAL	GRO	LCE	MAN	MOD	PAD	PIA	REG	SAL	SAS	TOR	TRI	VIC
AlbinoLeffe	—	1–3	1–1	1–1	1–2	2–0	1–1	2–0	4–1	2–0	1–1	1–3	1–0	0–3	1–2	0–1	2–0	3–2	0–0	0–1	0–3	2–2
Ancona	2–1	—	1–2	2–0	0–0	2–3	0–1	2–0	3–1	3–1	1–1	1–1	1–1	2–0	2–2	2–1	1–2	2–0	2–2	2–1	2–1	2–0
Ascoli	1–1	1–3	—	2–0	1–1	1–1	3–1	2–1	1–2	1–1	1–1	1–2	2–1	2–0	1–0	1–1	1–3	4–2	1–5	1–2	1–0	1–1
Brescia	4–1	3–0	2–1	—	0–1	1–0	3–0	2–2	3–1	0–1	2–3	1–0	1–0	1–0	3–2	1–0	0–0	3–0	3–1	1–0	2–2	0–1
Cesena	0–0	0–2	1–0	2–0	—	1–0	0–2	2–3	4–0	0–0	2–2	3–1	3–1	2–1	2–0	3–0	0–1	3–0	0–1	1–1	4–1	3–1
Cittadella	2–1	1–0	2–0	1–1	1–1	—	3–0	2–1	0–1	1–2	1–1	3–0	6–0	1–1	1–1	1–1	1–0	1–0	0–0	2–0	2–0	2–1
Crotone	0–3	2–1	1–2	0–0	0–0	1–1	—	2–1	3–0	4–2	0–0	1–1	2–2	4–2	2–1	1–0	1–1	2–0	1–2	1–0	2–0	1–2
Empoli	1–3	3–0	4–2	1–2	2–0	4–3	3–1	—	2–0	2–2	2–2	2–2	4–0	3–0	4–0	2–0	2–0	5–2	1–1	0–0	1–1	1–0
Frosinone	2–2	1–1	1–5	1–0	0–2	2–1	1–1	3–1	—	2–0	1–0	0–4	1–0	0–0	2–2	2–3	2–0	1–0	0–3	2–2	2–2	0–1
Gallipoli	1–5	1–0	1–4	1–2	0–2	1–2	2–3	0–0	2–1	—	2–2	0–3	0–0	1–0	1–2	1–4	2–1	3–2	1–1	0–1	2–1	0–5
Grosseto	2–2	2–0	2–1	2–1	1–1	3–0	0–4	1–0	2–1	2–2	—	0–3	1–1	3–1	2–2	3–3	2–2	2–2	2–2	0–3	3–1	4–0
Lecce	2–1	3–0	0–0	2–2	1–2	1–5	0–0	1–0	1–3	1–0	3–2	—	2–1	0–0	2–1	1–0	3–2	1–0	0–0	2–1	1–1	1–0
Mantova	1–2	2–0	0–0	2–2	0–1	1–3	2–1	1–1	3–1	1–0	2–0	2–2	—	1–1	2–1	1–1	2–2	1–1	2–1	0–0	0–0	1–0
Modena	1–1	2–1	1–2	1–2	1–0	2–1	0–2	2–0	0–3	3–2	1–2	0–0	1–1	—	0–0	0–1	1–0	1–0	1–1	0–2	2–0	1–0
Padova	0–2	2–1	3–1	2–1	1–0	2–2	2–0	2–3	0–0	0–0	1–0	1–1	3–0	1–0	—	0–0	0–1	3–1	1–1	0–1	0–0	1–2
Piacenza	1–0	1–0	2–1	1–3	0–1	1–1	1–0	0–0	0–2	2–0	0–1	3–2	0–2	2–3	1–0	—	0–0	0–0	1–3	0–0	0–0	1–1
Reggina	3–1	0–3	1–2	4–0	1–3	1–1	1–0	1–1	1–0	2–1	1–1	2–4	3–1	0–1	1–1	2–1	—	3–1	0–2	1–2	3–1	0–2
Salernitana	1–1	3–0	0–0	1–3	0–0	1–2	4–1	1–0	1–2	1–3	3–4	1–2	1–3	1–2	0–0	1–0	0–2	—	1–4	0–3	1–2	0–1
Sassuolo	0–0	1–0	0–1	0–2	1–1	1–0	2–0	3–2	2–1	1–2	2–3	1–1	1–1	0–0	2–0	1–2	0–1	3–2	—	2–3	2–1	2–1
Torino	2–1	1–1	1–0	1–1	1–1	1–0	1–2	3–0	3–1	2–0	4–1	2–2	1–1	0–1	0–1	1–1	2–0	2–3	0–1	—	1–0	1–0
Triestina	2–3	2–1	2–0	0–1	0–0	2–0	0–0	1–0	0–3	1–0	1–0	1–4	2–1	1–1	2–1	1–3	2–1	2–0	0–1	2–0	—	0–0
Vicenza	1–2	2–2	2–2	1–0	0–0	0–2	0–2	2–1	2–0	2–2	0–0	0–0	1–1	1–1	0–0	0–0	3–1	0–0	1–1	1–0	0–0	—

Legend: Blue = home team win; Yellow = draw; Red = away team win.

== Play-off ==
=== Promotion ===
Semi-finals
First legs played 2 June 2010; return legs played 6 June 2010

Team 1	Agg.	Team 2	1st leg	2nd leg
Cittadella (6)	1–1*	(3) Brescia	0–1	1–0
Torino (5)	3–2	(4) Sassuolo	1–1	2–1

- In case of an aggregate tie, the higher seed advances.

Finals
First leg played 9 June 2010; return leg played 13 June 2010

Team 1	Agg.	Team 2	1st leg	2nd leg
Torino (5)	1-2	(3) Brescia	0–0	1-2

Brescia promoted to Serie A.

=== Relegation ===
First leg played 4 June 2010; return leg played 12 June 2010

Team 1	Agg.	Team 2	1st leg	2nd leg
Padova (19)	3-0	(18) Triestina	0–0	3-0

Later annulled after Ancona’s bankruptcy.

== Top goalscorers ==
Updated as of May 23, 2010

26 goals

- (Brazil) Éder (Empoli)

24 goals

- (Italy) Mirko Antenucci (Ascoli)
- (Italy) Rolando Bianchi (Torino)
- (Chile) Mauricio Pinilla (Grosseto)

23 goals

- (Italy) Andrea Caracciolo (Brescia)

22 goals

- (Italy) Matteo Ardemagni (Cittadella)
- (Italy) Salvatore Mastronunzio (Ancona)

18 goals

- (Italy) Alessandro Noselli (Sassuolo)

17 goals

- (Italy) Daniele Corvia (Lecce)

16 goals

- (Italy) Claudio Coralli (Empoli)

== Attendances ==
#	Football club	Average attendance
1	Torino	13,584
2	Cesena	11,272
3	Lecce	7,842
4	Vicenza	7,322
5	Padova	6,987
6	Triestina	6,472
7	Reggina	6,327
8	Salernitana	5,904
9	Modena	5,785
10	Ancona	5,721
11	Mantova	5,377
12	Ascoli	4,942
13	Crotone	4,167
14	Frosinone	4,098
15	Brescia	3,937
16	Sassuolo	3,245
17	Piacenza	3,193
18	AlbinoLeffe	3,192
19	Empoli	3,063
20	Cittadella	2,944
21	Grosseto	2,798
22	Gallipoli	1,293
