= 2007–08 Serie A =

106th season of top-tier Italian football

Serie A
- Season: 2007–08
- Dates: 25 August 2007 – 18 May 2008
- Champions: Internazionale; 16th title
- Relegated: Empoli; Parma; Livorno
- Champions League: Internazionale; Roma; Juventus; Fiorentina
- UEFA Cup: Milan; Sampdoria; Udinese
- Intertoto Cup: Napoli
- Matches: 380
- Goals: 970 (2.55 per match)
- Top goalscorer: Alessandro Del Piero (21 goals)
- Highest scoring: Udinese 3–5 Genoa; Roma 4–4 Napoli; Torino 4–4 Parma
- Average attendance: 23,887

The 2007–08 Serie A (known as the Serie A TIM for sponsorship reasons) was the 106th season of top-tier Italian football, the 76th in a round-robin tournament. It started on 25 August 2007 and ended on 18 May 2008. Internazionale Milano successfully defended the championship on the final day of the season, finishing first with 85 points, three ahead of Roma.

== Events ==
=== Plusvalenze investigation ===
Inquiries are being conducted by the CO.VI.SOC. (Italian football's financial watchdogs) into the finances of four Serie A clubs (Internazionale, Milan, Sampdoria, and Reggina) who stand accused of falsely inflating player values — a practice known as plusvalenze in Italian — in order to qualify financially for the 2005–06 Serie A. If the allegations prove true, penalties could range from fines to point deductions, relegation to Serie B, and even the stripping of Internazionale's 2005-06 scudetto, which was stripped from Juventus as a result of the Calciopoli scandal before being awarded to Internazionale.

=== Lazio fan killed by police ===
On the morning of 11 November 2007 26-year-old Lazio fan Gabriele Sandri, a DJ from Rome, was killed by a shot in his neck while sitting inside a car, by a policeman, after some other fans of Lazio violently assaulted a group of Juventus ultras with stones on the A1 Motorway service station of Badia al Pino in Arezzo. Early reports suggested that a stray bullet from a gun, set to distract the group of ultras, hit the Lazio fan in the neck as he sat in a car and killed him. An emergency meeting set up between Lega Calcio president Antonio Matarrese and police chief Antonio Manganelli decided that the game between Inter and Lazio would be called off, but the rest of the fixtures would go ahead that day, starting at a slightly later time (about 10 minutes later). The Atalanta–Milan game was eventually suspended following unrest caused by local ultras attempting to break off the protection glass in order to invade the pitch and stop the match. Later in the afternoon, the Italian Football Federation chose to postpone also the game between AS Roma and Cagliari, whose kick off was scheduled for 8:30 pm at Stadio Olimpico, Rome. However, this did not prevent violent riots, as hundreds of armed hooligans attacked a police barracks and the CONI (Italian Olympic National Committee) headquarters in Rome.

Though Sandri's death was later held by some to have been caused by a tragic error by a policeman who claimed his gun went off as he was running. Prosecutors then opted initially to open an inquiry into manslaughter against the policeman, nevertheless the initial hearing held that Sandri's death was culpable homicide, and the policeman involved (Luigi Spaccarotella) was condemned to 6 years imprisonment. On appeal, the higher court not only confirmed this judgment, but increased the punishment to 9 years and 4 months as an element of intentionality was found.

=== Final week ===
The championship was decided in the final week, as Inter, who managed to secure even an 11-point advantage to rivals Roma in mid-season, lost almost all of it in the final weeks, maintaining only a one-point advantage with only one match to play. In the final week, both Inter and Roma were scheduled to play away matches opposed to relegation-battling sides, respectively Parma and Catania. Both matches were successively forbidden to be attended by Inter and Roma fans. In the end, Inter secured the scudetto with a 2–0 win, with both goals being scored in the second half by Zlatan Ibrahimović, who recovered from a long-term injury in time to play the game, whereas Roma only managed to achieve a 1–1 draw at Stadio Angelo Massimino against Walter Zenga's Catania, a result which allowed the Sicilian side to escape relegation at the expense of Empoli and Parma.

== Teams ==
=== Stadiums and locations ===
Locations of the 2007–08 Serie A teams

Club	City	Stadium	Capacity	2006-2007 season
Atalanta	Bergamo	Stadio Atleti Azzurri d'Italia	26,378	8th in Serie A
Cagliari	Cagliari	Stadio Sant'Elia	23,486	16th in Serie A
Catania	Catania	Stadio Angelo Massimino	23,420	13th in Serie A
Empoli	Empoli	Stadio Carlo Castellani	19,795	7th in Serie A
Fiorentina	Florence	Stadio Artemio Franchi	47,282	6th in Serie A
Genoa	Genoa	Stadio Luigi Ferraris	36,685	3rd in Serie B
Internazionale	Milan	San Siro	82,955	Serie A Champions
Juventus	Turin	Stadio Olimpico di Torino	27,168	Serie B Champions
Lazio	Rome	Stadio Olimpico	82,307	3rd in Serie A
Livorno	Livorno	Stadio Armando Picchi	19,238	11th in Serie A
Milan	Milan	San Siro	82,955	4th in Serie A
Napoli	Naples	Stadio San Paolo	60,240	2nd in Serie B
Palermo	Palermo	Stadio Renzo Barbera	37,242	5th in Serie A
Parma	Parma	Stadio Ennio Tardini	27,906	12th in Serie A
Reggina	Reggio Calabria	Stadio Oreste Granillo	27,454	16th in Serie A
Roma	Rome	Stadio Olimpico	82,307	2nd in Serie A
Sampdoria	Genoa	Stadio Luigi Ferraris	36,685	9th in Serie A
Siena	Siena	Stadio Artemio Franchi – Montepaschi Arena	15,373	15th in Serie A
Torino	Turin	Stadio Olimpico di Torino	27,168	17th in Serie A
Udinese	Udine	Stadio Friuli	41,652	10th in Serie A

=== Personnels and Sponsoring ===
Team	Head coach	Captain	Kit manufacturer	Shirt sponsor
Atalanta	(Italy) Luigi Delneri	(Italy) Antonino Bernardini	Errea	Sit In Sport, Daihatsu
Cagliari	(Italy) Davide Ballardini	(Uruguay) Diego López	Umbro	Tiscali, Sky
Catania	(Italy) Silvio Baldini	(Italy) Davide Baiocco	Legea	SP Energia Siciliana, Regione Sicilia/Cesame
Empoli	(Italy) Alberto Malesani	(Italy) Ighli Vannucchi	Asics	Navigare, Computer Gross
Fiorentina	(Italy) Cesare Prandelli	(Italy) Dario Dainelli	Lotto	Toyota
Genoa	(Italy) Gian Piero Gasperini	(Italy) Marco Rossi	Errea	Eurobet
Internazionale	(Italy) Roberto Mancini	(Argentina) Javier Zanetti	Nike	Pirelli
Juventus	(Italy) Claudio Ranieri	(Italy) Alessandro Del Piero	Nike	New Holland
Lazio	(Italy) Delio Rossi	(Italy) Luciano Zauri	Puma	So.Spe/Edileuropa
Livorno	(Italy) Giancarlo Camolese	(Italy) David Balleri	Asics	Gruppo Banca Carige, Mediaset Premium
Milan	(Italy) Carlo Ancelotti	(Italy) Paolo Maldini	Adidas	Bwin
Napoli	(Italy) Edoardo Reja	(Italy) Paolo Cannavaro	Diadora	Lete
Palermo	(Italy) Francesco Guidolin	(Italy) Andrea Barzagli	Lotto	Pramac
Parma	(Italy) Domenico Di Carlo	(Italy) Luca Bucci	Errea	Kome, Il Granchio
Reggina	(Italy) Nevio Orlandi	(Italy) Francesco Cozza	Onze	Gicos, Regione Calabria
Roma	(Italy) Luciano Spalletti	(Italy) Francesco Totti	Kappa	Wind
Sampdoria	(Italy) Walter Mazzarri	(Italy) Sergio Volpi	Kappa	Erg
Siena	(Italy) Mario Beretta	(Italy) Enrico Chiesa	Umbro	Banca Monte dei Paschi di Siena
Torino	(Italy) Walter Novellino	(Italy) Gianluca Comotto	Asics	Reale Mutua, Fratelli Beretta
Udinese	(Italy) Pasquale Marino	(Italy) Giampiero Pinzi	Lotto	Gaudì Jeans

== League table ==
Pos	Team	Pld	W	D	L	GF	GA	GD	Pts	Qualification or relegation
1	Internazionale (C)	38	25	10	3	69	26	+43	85	Qualification to Champions League group stage
2	Roma	38	24	10	4	72	37	+35	82	Qualification to Champions League group stage
3	Juventus	38	20	12	6	72	37	+35	72	Qualification to Champions League third qualifying round
4	Fiorentina	38	19	9	10	55	39	+16	66	Qualification to Champions League third qualifying round
5	Milan	38	18	10	10	66	38	+28	64	Qualification to UEFA Cup first round (Note: The 7th-placed team qualified for the UEFA Cup due to both of the Coppa Italia finalists, Roma and Internazionale, finishing 6th or higher.)
6	Sampdoria	38	17	9	12	56	46	+10	60	Qualification to UEFA Cup first round
7	Udinese	38	16	9	13	48	53	−5	57	Qualification to UEFA Cup first round
8	Napoli	38	14	8	16	50	53	−3	50	Qualification to Intertoto Cup third round
9	Atalanta	38	12	12	14	52	56	−4	48 (Note: Atalanta finished ahead of Genoa on head-to-head points: Genoa 2-1 Atalanta, Atalanta 2-0 Genoa.)	
10	Genoa	38	13	9	16	44	52	−8	48	
11	Palermo	38	12	11	15	47	57	−10	47	
12	Lazio	38	11	13	14	47	51	−4	46	
13	Siena	38	9	17	12	40	45	−5	44	
14	Cagliari (Note: Cagliari was docked 3 points for filing an unauthorized lawsuit, but the penalty was later reversed.)	38	11	9	18	40	56	−16	42	
15	Torino	38	8	16	14	36	49	−13	40 (Note: Torino finished ahead of Reggina on head-to-head points: Torino 2-2 Reggina, Reggina 1–3 Torino.)	
16	Reggina	38	9	13	16	37	56	−19	40	
17	Catania	38	8	13	17	33	45	−12	37	
18	Empoli (R)	38	9	9	20	29	52	−23	36	Relegation to Serie B
19	Parma (R)	38	7	13	18	42	62	−20	34	Relegation to Serie B
20	Livorno (R)	38	6	12	20	35	60	−25	30	Relegation to Serie B

Source: Serie A
Rules for classification: 1) points; 2) head-to-head points; 3) head-to-head goal difference; 4) head-to-head goals scored; 5) goal difference; 6) number of goals scored.
(C) Champions; (R) Relegated

== Results ==
Home \ Away	ATA	CAG	CTN	EMP	FIO	GEN	INT	JUV	LAZ	LIV	MIL	NAP	PAL	PAR	REG	ROM	SAM	SIE	TOR	UDI
Atalanta		2–2	0–0	4–1	2–2	2–0	0–2	0–4	2–1	3–2	2–1	5–1	1–3	2–0	2–2	1–2	4–1	2–2	2–2	0–0
Cagliari	1–0		1–1	2–0	2–1	2–1	0–2	2–3	1–0	0–0	1–2	2–1	0–1	1–1	2–2	1–1	0–3	1–0	3–0	0–1
Catania	1–2	2–1		1–0	0–1	0–0	0–2	1–1	1–0	1–0	1–1	3–0	3–1	0–0	1–2	1–1	2–0	0–0	1–2	2–0
Empoli	0–1	4–1	2–0		0–2	1–1	0–2	0–0	1–0	2–1	1–3	0–0	3–1	1–1	1–1	2–2	0–2	0–2	0–0	0–1
Fiorentina	2–2	5–1	2–1	3–1		3–1	0–2	1–1	1–0	1–0	0–1	1–0	1–0	3–1	2–0	2–2	2–2	3–0	2–1	1–2
Genoa	2–1	2–0	2–1	0–1	0–0		1–1	0–2	0–2	1–1	0–3	2–0	3–3	1–0	2–0	0–1	0–1	1–3	3–0	3–2
Internazionale	2–1	2–1	2–0	1–0	2–0	4–1		1–2	3–0	2–0	2–1	2–1	2–1	3–2	2–0	1–1	3–0	2–2	4–0	1–1
Juventus	1–0	1–1	1–1	3–0	2–3	1–0	1–1		5–2	5–1	3–2	1–0	5–0	3–0	4–0	1–0	0–0	2–0	0–0	0–1
Lazio	3–0	3–1	2–0	0–0	0–1	1–2	1–1	2–3		2–0	1–5	2–1	1–2	1–0	1–0	3–2	2–1	1–1	2–2	0–1
Livorno	1–1	1–2	1–0	1–0	0–3	1–1	2–2	1–3	0–1		1–4	1–2	2–4	1–1	1–1	1–1	3–1	0–0	0–1	0–0
Milan	1–2	3–1	1–1	0–1	1–1	2–0	2–1	0–0	1–1	1–1		5–2	2–1	1–1	5–1	0–1	1–2	1–0	0–0	4–1
Napoli	2–0	0–2	2–0	1–3	2–0	1–2	1–0	3–1	2–2	1–0	3–1		1–0	1–0	1–1	0–2	2–0	0–0	1–1	3–1
Palermo	0–0	2–1	1–0	2–0	2–0	2–3	0–0	3–2	2–2	1–0	2–1	2–1		1–1	1–1	0–2	0–2	2–3	1–1	1–1
Parma	2–3	1–1	2–2	1–0	1–2	1–0	0–2	2–2	2–2	3–2	0–0	1–2	2–1		3–0	0–3	1–2	2–2	2–0	2–0
Reggina	1–1	2–0	3–1	2–0	0–0	2–0	0–1	2–1	1–1	1–3	0–1	1–1	0–0	2–1		0–2	1–0	4–0	1–3	1–3
Roma	2–1	2–0	2–0	2–1	1–0	3–2	1–4	2–2	3–2	1–1	2–1	4–4	1–0	4–0	2–0		2–0	3–0	4–1	2–1
Sampdoria	3–0	1–1	3–1	3–0	2–2	0–0	1–1	3–3	0–0	2–0	0–5	2–0	3–0	3–0	3–0	0–3		1–0	2–2	3–0
Siena	1–1	1–0	1–1	3–0	1–0	0–1	2–3	1–0	1–1	2–3	1–1	1–1	2–2	2–0	0–0	3–0	1–2		0–0	1–1
Torino	1–0	2–0	1–1	0–1	0–1	1–1	0–1	0–1	0–0	1–2	0–1	2–1	3–1	4–4	2–2	0–0	1–0	1–1		0–1
Udinese	2–0	0–2	2–1	2–2	3–1	3–5	0–0	1–2	2–2	2–0	0–1	0–5	1–1	2–1	2–0	1–3	3–2	2–0	2–1	

Source: lega-calcio.it (in Italian)
Legend: Blue = home team win; Yellow = draw; Red = away team win.

== Top goalscorers ==
Rank	Player	Club	Goals
1	(Italy) Alessandro Del Piero	Juventus	21
2	(France) David Trezeguet	Juventus	20
3	(Italy) Marco Borriello	Genoa	19
4	(Italy) Antonio Di Natale	Udinese	17
4	(Sweden) Zlatan Ibrahimović	Internazionale	17
4	(Romania) Adrian Mutu	Fiorentina	17
7	(Brazil) Amauri	Palermo	15
7	(Brazil) Kaká	Milan	15
9	(North Macedonia) Goran Pandev	Lazio	14
9	(Italy) Tommaso Rocchi	Lazio	14
9	(Italy) Francesco Totti	Roma	14

== Coaches ==
Club	Head coach	From	To
Atalanta	Luigi Delneri	June 9, 2007	
Cagliari	Marco Giampaolo	February 26, 2007	November 13, 2007
Cagliari	Nedo Sonetti	November 13, 2007	December 27, 2007
Cagliari	Davide Ballardini	December 27, 2007	
Catania	Silvio Baldini	June 3, 2007	March 31, 2008
Catania	Walter Zenga	April 1, 2008	
Empoli	Luigi Cagni	January 19, 2006	November 26, 2007
Empoli	Alberto Malesani	November 26, 2007	March 31, 2008
Empoli	Luigi Cagni	March 31, 2008	
Fiorentina	Cesare Prandelli	June 10, 2005	
Genoa	Gian Piero Gasperini	June 29, 2006	
Internazionale	Roberto Mancini	July 7, 2004	
Juventus	Claudio Ranieri	June 4, 2007	
Lazio	Delio Rossi	June 10, 2005	
Livorno	Fernando Orsi	March 21, 2007	October 9, 2007
Livorno	Giancarlo Camolese	October 10, 2007	April 28, 2008
Livorno	Fernando Orsi	April 28, 2008	
Milan	Carlo Ancelotti	November 5, 2001	
Napoli	Edoardo Reja	January 18, 2005	
Palermo	Stefano Colantuono	June 7, 2007	November 26, 2007
Palermo	Francesco Guidolin	November 26, 2007	March 24, 2008
Palermo	Stefano Colantuono	March 24, 2008	
Parma	Domenico Di Carlo	June 12, 2007	March 10, 2008
Parma	Héctor Cúper	March 11, 2008	May 12, 2008
Parma	Andrea Manzo	May 12, 2008	
Reggina	Massimo Ficcadenti	July 1, 2007	November 1, 2007
	Renzo Ulivieri	November 1, 2007	March 3, 2008
	Nevio Orlandi	March 3, 2008	
Roma	Luciano Spalletti	June 17, 2005	
Sampdoria	Walter Mazzarri	May 31, 2007	
Siena	Andrea Mandorlini	June 12, 2007	November 12, 2007
Siena	Mario Beretta	November 12, 2007	
Torino	Walter Novellino	June 6, 2007	April 16, 2008
Torino	Gianni De Biasi	April 16, 2008	
Udinese	Pasquale Marino	June 5, 2007	

=== 2007–08 events ===
- Atalanta: on June 9, 2007 Luigi Delneri was announced as new head coach following Stefano Colantuono's departure to Palermo.
- Cagliari: on November 13 Cagliari chairman Massimo Cellino sacked Marco Giampaolo and replaced him with veteran coach Nedo Sonetti, who already served twice with the rossoblu before this new appointment. On December 19 Sonetti tendered his resignation, after he managed to achieve only one point in three matches in charge, and Cellino called Giampaolo to serve again as rossoblu head coach. However, Giampaolo, still linked to Cagliari by a contract, turned down the opportunity to return. The next day, the club announced that it had rejected Sonetti's resignation. Sonetti was ultimately sacked only a few days later, on December 27, following a crushing 5–1 loss to Fiorentina, and replaced by Davide Ballardini, who served as Cagliari head coach in the early weeks of the 2005–06 season.
- Catania: on June 3, 2007 Silvio Baldini was announced as new head coach. The team initially enjoyed a good shape, notably gaining a spot in the Coppa Italia semi-finals, but lost position with time, being in 16th place as of Week 31, only three points ahead of last-placed Empoli, convincing Baldini to leave the club with mutual consent on March 31, 2008. He was replaced the next day by Walter Zenga, former head coach of Red Star Belgrade and Steaua București, at his first coaching experience with a Serie A team.
- Empoli: on November 26, 2007 the Tuscan side chose to sack Luigi Cagni, who achieved only ten points in fourteen matches (18th place in the league table) and failed to win the 2007–08 UEFA Cup first round, replacing him with Alberto Malesani. On March 31, 2008, after a 2–0 home loss to Sampdoria which left Empoli alone in last place, the board decided to sack Malesani, reinstalling Cagni in charge.
- Juventus: on June 4, 2007 former Parma head coach Claudio Ranieri was unveiled as new boss.
- Livorno: on October 9, 2007 Fernando Orsi was sacked following a string of poor results that brought the team down to bottom place in the league with two points and no win after seven games. The position was then filled by Giancarlo Camolese the next day. Camolese initially managed to improve Livorno's performances; however in the final part of the season Livorno entered into a deep result crisis that led them down to the league bottom, with three matches remaining, and Camolese being ultimately sacked on April 28, 2008, with Orsi re-appointed back at the helm of the amaranto.
- Palermo: on June 7, 2007 Stefano Colantuono of Atalanta was announced to be the next rosanero boss for the 2007-08 season. However, on November 26 Colantuono was sacked following a 5–0 defeat to Juventus, and club chairman Maurizio Zamparini appointed Francesco Guidolin as his replacement, inaugurating a fourth spell with Palermo for the tactician. However, results did not improve under Guidolin, and three consecutive losses, followed by some controversial post-match comments in a 2–3 home loss to Genoa on March 22, 2008 led Zamparini to re-appoint Colantuono at the helm of the rosanero on March 24.
- Parma: on June 12, 2007 Domenico Di Carlo was announced as new boss following the departure of Claudio Ranieri. However, as Parma struggled to keep themselves off the relegation battle, Di Carlo was sacked on March 10, 2008 following a 1–2 home defeat to Sampdoria. The next day the club announced to have appointed Héctor Cúper as new head coach. The Argentine boss did not manage to improve results, with Parma finding themselves in 18th place with only one remaining match to be played at home against first-placed Internazionale, only two points behind the last Serie A spot. On May 12 Parma chairman Tommaso Ghirardi then surprisingly announced to have sacked Cúper, replacing him with youth team coach Andrea Manzo for the final league matchday in a desperate attempt to escape relegation.
- Reggina: on June 23, 2007 news reports announced Massimo Ficcadenti as new boss following the departure of Walter Mazzarri. However, on June 27 Verona announced they were not giving Ficcadenti permission to leave the club and move to Reggina. On July 1, Reggina finally announced on their website to have appointed Ficcadenti as coach, after he successfully rescinded his contract with Verona. Ficcadenti was however sacked on November 1, following a 3–1 home loss to last-placed Livorno and no wins in the first ten league days, and veteran coach Renzo Ulivieri was appointed to replace him. However, on March 3, 2008 the club management decided to dismiss Ulivieri from his post following a 0–0 home draw to Palermo, as Reggina was filling the 19th place with 22 points, and replaced him with team scout and former youth team coach Nevio Orlandi.
- Sampdoria: on May 31, 2007 Walter Mazzarri was named new Samp boss.
- Siena: on June 12, 2007 Andrea Mandorlini was confirmed new head coach following separation by mutual consent between the club and its boss Mario Beretta. However Mandorlini was sacked on November 12, after a 2–3 home loss to Livorno which left the team in last place, and Beretta accepted to return at Siena.
- Torino: on June 6, 2007 former Sampdoria boss Walter Novellino was announced head coach for the new season, replacing Gianni De Biasi. On April 16, 2008, following a string of disappointing results that left the granata only four points ahead the relegation zone, leading to heavy criticisms from the supporting fanbase, Torino president Urbano Cairo chose to sack Novellino and reappoint De Biasi, a fan favourite, as head coach.
- Udinese: on June 5, 2007 former Catania boss Pasquale Marino was officially unveiled as new head coach.

== Awards ==
=== Individual Awards (Oscar del Calcio) ===
The official Serie A individual awards for the 2007–08 season were presented by the Italian Footballers' Association (AIC) at the annual Oscar del Calcio ceremony:

2008 AIC Oscar del Calcio Winners
Category	Winner	Club / Association
Footballer of the Year	(Sweden) Zlatan Ibrahimović (Inter Milan)	
Italian Footballer	(Italy) Alessandro Del Piero (Juventus)	
Tactical Positions	(Italy) Giorgio Chiellini (Defender of the Year / Juventus)	(Italy) Gianluigi Buffon (Goalkeeper of the Year / Juventus)
Foreign & Youth	(Sweden) Zlatan Ibrahimović (Foreign Footballer / Inter Milan)	(Slovakia) Marek Hamšík (Young Footballer / Napoli)
Staff & Officials	(Italy) Cesare Prandelli (Coach of the Year / Fiorentina)	Roberto Rosetti (Referee of the Year)

Team of the Year
Goalkeeper	(Italy) Gianluigi Buffon (Juventus)			
Defenders	(Brazil) Maicon (Inter Milan)	(Italy) Giorgio Chiellini (Juventus)	(Italy) Alessandro Gamberini (Fiorentina)	(Italy) Paolo Maldini (Milan)
Midfielders	(Italy) Daniele De Rossi (Roma)		(Argentina) Esteban Cambiasso (Inter Milan)	(Italy) Andrea Pirlo (Milan)
Forwards	(Brazil) Kaká (Milan)		(Italy) Alessandro Del Piero (Juventus)	(Sweden) Zlatan Ibrahimović (Inter Milan)

== Attendances ==
#	Club	Avg. attendance	Highest
1	AC Milan	56,642	81,766
2	Internazionale	51,211	78,675
3	SSC Napoli	40,780	59,272
4	AS Roma	37,276	62,241
5	ACF Fiorentina	31,387	42,449
6	US Città di Palermo	25,541	34,271
7	Genoa CFC	24,745	31,618
8	UC Sampdoria	21,888	33,060
9	SS Lazio	21,485	49,284
10	Juventus FC	20,930	22,722
11	Torino FC	19,226	23,974
12	Calcio Catania	17,606	21,148
13	Udinese Calcio	15,672	25,152
14	Parma FC	15,427	25,149
15	Reggina Calcio	13,147	23,248
16	Cagliari Calcio	12,259	25,140
17	AC Siena	10,351	15,419
18	Atalanta BC	10,112	21,323
19	AS Livorno Calcio	9,901	14,630
20	Empoli FC	8,005	16,326
