= 2007–08 in Italian football =

The 2007–08 season was the 106th season of competitive football in Italy.

== Overview ==
- Juventus will make their return to Serie A after being relegated to Serie B for the previous season for their role in the 2006 Serie A scandal.
- Grosseto will make their debut in Serie B, the highest division in which the club has participated in its history.

== Events ==
- June 28, 2007 - The FIGC announce that the Serie A season will begin on August 26, 2007 and end on May 18, 2008.
- August 19, 2007 - In the Italian Super Cup, Roma defeat Inter 1-0.
- August 25, 2007 - Serie B season begins.
- August 26, 2007 - Serie A season begins.
- November 17, 2007 - Italy book their place in Euro 2008 with a win over Scotland.
- December 2, 2007 - Italy drawn into Group C for Euro 2008 along with Holland, Romania, and France
- May 18, 2008 - Inter successfully defends their title in Serie A.
- June 15, 2008 - Lecce joins Bologna and Chievo as the teams promoted to Serie A.
- June 17, 2008 - Italy finishes second in Group C in Euro 2008 and qualifies for the quarter-finals
- June 22, 2008 - Italy is eliminated from Euro 2008 by Spain.
- June 26, 2008 - Roberto Donadoni is fired as head coach; Marcello Lippi returns to the position.

== Managerial changes ==
Name	Club	Date of departure	Replacement	Date of appointment
Fernando Orsi	Livorno	9 October 2007	Giancarlo Camolese	10 October 2007
Massimo Ficcadenti	Reggina	1 November 2007	Renzo Ulivieri	1 November 2007
Andrea Mandorlini	Siena	12 November 2007	Mario Beretta	12 November 2007
Marco Giampaolo	Cagliari	13 November 2007	Nedo Sonetti	13 November 2007
Stefano Colantuono	Palermo	26 November 2007	Francesco Guidolin	27 November 2007
Luigi Cagni	Empoli	26 November 2007	Alberto Malesani	27 November 2007

== National team ==
Pos	Team	Pld	W	D	L	GF	GA	GD	Pts	Qualification	(Italy)	(France)	(Scotland)	(Ukraine)	(Lithuania)	(Georgia (country))	(Faroe Islands)
1	Italy	12	9	2	1	22	9	+13	29	Qualify for final tournament	—	0–0	2–0	2–0	1–1	2–0	3–1
2	France	12	8	2	2	25	5	+20	26	Qualify for final tournament	3–1	—	0–1	2–0	2–0	1–0	5–0
3	Scotland	12	8	0	4	21	12	+9	24		1–2	1–0	—	3–1	3–1	2–1	6–0
4	Ukraine	12	5	2	5	18	16	+2	17		1–2	2–2	2–0	—	1–0	3–2	5–0
5	Lithuania	12	5	1	6	11	13	−2	16		0–2	0–1	1–2	2–0	—	1–0	2–1
6	Georgia	12	3	1	8	16	19	−3	10		1–3	0–3	2–0	1–1	0–2	—	3–1
7	Faroe Islands	12	0	0	12	4	43	−39	0		1–2	0–6	0–2	0–2	0–1	0–6	—

Source: UEFA
Rules for classification: Qualification tiebreakers

Italy will continue their qualifying campaign for Euro 2008. They are coached by Roberto Donadoni.

Date	Venue	Opponents	Score	Competition	Italy scorers
August 22, 2007	Stadium Puskás Ferenc, Budapest (A)	Hungary	1-3	F	Antonio Di Natale
September 8, 2007	San Siro, Milan (H)	France	0-0	ECQ	
September 12, 2007	NSC Olimpiyskyi Stadium, Kyiv (A)	Ukraine	2-1	ECQ	Antonio Di Natale (2)
October 13, 2007	Stadio Luigi Ferraris, Genoa (H)	Georgia	2-0	ECQ	Andrea Pirlo, Fabio Grosso
October 17, 2007	Stadio Artemio Franchi, Siena (H)	South Africa	2-0	F	Cristiano Lucarelli (2)
November 17, 2007	Hampden Park, Glasgow (A)	Scotland	2-1	ECQ	Luca Toni, Cristian Panucci
November 21, 2007	Stadio Alberto Braglia, Modena (H)	Faroe Islands	3-1	ECQ	Benjaminsen(o.g), Luca Toni, Giorgio Chiellini
February 6, 2008	Letzigrund, Zürich (N)	Portugal	3-1	F	Luca Toni, Andrea Pirlo, Fabio Quagliarella
March 26, 2008	Estadio Manuel Martínez Valero, Elche (A)	Spain	0-1	F	
May 30, 2008	Stadio Artemio Franchi, Siena (H)	Belgium	3-1	F	Antonio Di Natale (2), Mauro Camoranesi
June 9, 2008	Stade de Suisse, Bern (N)	Netherlands	0-3	EC (C)	
June 13, 2008	Letzigrund, Zürich (N)	Romania	1-1	EC (C)	Cristian Panucci
June 17, 2008	Letzigrund, Zürich (N)	France	2-0	EC (C)	Andrea Pirlo (P), Daniele De Rossi
June 22, 2008	Ernst Happel, Vienna (N)	Spain	0-0 (2-4)	EC (Q)	

Key

- H = Home match
- A = Away match
- N = Neutral site
- ECQ = European Championship Qualifier
- F = friendly
- EC (C) = European Championship - Group C match
- EC (Q) = European Championship - Quarter-final match

== Honours ==
Competition	Winner
Serie A	Inter
Coppa Italia	Roma
Serie B	Chievo
Serie C1	C1/A: Sassuolo; C1/B: Salernitana
Serie C2	C2/A: Pergocrema; C2/B: Reggiana; C2/C: Benevento
Coppa Italia Serie C	Bassano Virtus
Serie D	Girone A: Alessandria; Girone B: Como; Girone C: Itala San Marco; Girone D: Giacomense; Girone E: Figline; Girone F: Sangiustese; Girone G: Isola Liri; Girone H: Aversa Normanna; Girone I: Cosenza
Eccellenza Regionale	See Winners
Italian Super Cup	Roma

== Transfer deals ==
- List of Italian football transfers 2007-08

== Deaths ==
- Erminio Favalli, 64, Juventus and Palermo midfielder.
- Adriano Lombardi, 62, Avellino defender and then manager. Killed by amyotrophic lateral sclerosis.
