= 2007–08 Piacenza Calcio season =

Piacenza
2007–08 season
- Chairman: Fabrizio Garilli
- Manager: Felice Secondini (until 23 October); Mario Somma
- Stadium: Stadio Dino Manuzzi
- Serie B: 15th
- Coppa Italia: Third round
- Top goalscorer: League: Zlatko Dedič (10); All: Zlatko Dedič (10)
- Average home league attendance: 3,170
Home colours	Away colours	Third colours

The 2007–08 Piacenza Calcio season was the club's 89th season in existence and the club's fifth consecutive in the second division of Italian football. In addition to the domestic league, Piacenza participated in this season's edition of the Coppa Italia.

== Competitions ==
=== Overview ===
Competition	First match	Last match	Starting round	Final position	Record							
Competition	First match	Last match	Starting round	Final position	Pld	W	D	L	GF	GA	GD	Win %
Serie B	25 August 2007	1 June 2008	Matchday 1	15th	42	13	8	21	43	59	−16	30.95
Coppa Italia	14 August 2007	29 August 2007	Round 1	Quarter-finals	3	2	0	1	6	4	+2	66.67
Total					45	15	8	22	49	63	−14	33.33

Source: Competitions

=== Serie B ===
==== League table ====
Pos	Team	Pld	W	D	L	GF	GA	GD	Pts	Promotion or relegation
13	Grosseto	42	10	19	13	47	54	−7	49	
14	Messina (Note: Subsequently did not submit subscription to 2008–09 Serie B and placed in 2008–09 Serie D.) (E, R, R)	42	13	10	19	38	62	−24	49	Relegation to Serie D
15	Piacenza	42	13	8	21	43	59	−16	47	
16	Modena	42	10	16	16	57	65	−8	46	
17	Vicenza	42	10	15	17	43	60	−17	45	

Source: Panini
Rules for classification: 1) points; 2) head-to-head points; 3) head-to-head goal difference; 4) head-to-head goals scored; 5) goal difference; 6) number of goals scored.
(E) Eliminated; (R) Relegated

==== Results summary ====
Overall								Home						Away					
Pld	W	D	L	GF	GA	GD	Pts	W	D	L	GF	GA	GD	W	D	L	GF	GA	GD
0	0	0	0	0	0	0	0	0	0	0	0	0	0	0	0	0	0	0	0

==== Results by round ====
Round	1	2	3	4	5	6	7	8	9	10	11	12	13	14	15	16	17	18	19	20	21	22	23	24	25	26	27	28	29	30	31	32	33	34	35	36	37	38	39	40	41	42
Ground	A	H	A	H	A	H	H	A	H	A	H	A	A	H	A	H	A	H	A	H	A	H	A	H	A	H	A	A	H	A	H	A	H	H	A	H	A	H	A	H	A	H
Result	L	L	L	W	L	L	W	W	L	L	L	W	D	W	W	L	L	W	L	D	L	W	L	L	L	D	L	W	W	W	W	L	W	L	L	D	L	L	D	D	D	D
Position	21	21	22	18	21	21	18	15	16	16	19	17	16	13	12	14	15	14	14	14	15	14	14	15	16	15	16	15	14	13	13	14	13	13	13	14	15	15	15	15	15	15

A = Away; H = Home; W = Win; D = Draw; L = Loss

==== Matches ====
25 August 2007 1	Ascoli	4–1	Piacenza

1 September 2007 2	Piacenza	1–2	Modena

15 September 2007 4	Piacenza	1–0	Bari

18 September 2007 3	Brescia	2–0	Piacenza

22 September 2007 5	Treviso	1–0	Piacenza

25 September 2007 6	Piacenza	0–1	Lecce

29 September 2007 7	Piacenza	1–0	Spezia

6 October 2007 8	Avellino	0–1	Piacenza

14 October 2007 9	Piacenza	0–1	Bologna

20 October 2007 10	Pisa	3–1	Piacenza

27 October 2007 11	Piacenza	1–3	Chievo

30 October 2007 12	Rimini	0–1	Piacenza

3 November 2007 13	Frosinone	2–2	Piacenza

10 November 2007 14	Piacenza	2–0	Ravenna

24 November 2007 16	Piacenza	0–1	Messina

1 December 2007 15	Vicenza	0–1	Piacenza

8 December 2007 17	AlbinoLeffe	2–0	Piacenza

15 December 2007 18	Piacenza	2–0	Triestina

22 December 2007 19	Grosseto	2–1	Piacenza

12 January 2008 20	Piacenza	0–0	Cesena

19 January 2008 21	Mantova	1–0	Piacenza

26 January 2008 22	Piacenza	2–1	Ascoli

2 February 2008 23	Modena	2–0	Piacenza

9 February 2008 24	Piacenza	2–4	Brescia

12 February 2008 25	Bari	2–1	Piacenza

16 February 2008 26	Piacenza	0–0	Treviso

23 February 2008 27	Lecce	3–1	Piacenza

1 March 2008 28	Spezia	1–2	Piacenza

8 March 2008 29	Piacenza	1–0	Avellino

15 March 2008 30	Bologna	1–2	Piacenza

18 March 2008 31	Piacenza	4–2	Pisa

21 March 2008 32	Chievo	1–0	Piacenza

29 March 2008 33	Piacenza	2–1	Rimini

5 April 2008 34	Piacenza	1–2	Frosinone

12 April 2008 35	Ravenna	1–0	Piacenza

19 April 2008 36	Piacenza	1–1	Vicenza

26 April 2008 37	Messina	2–0	Piacenza

3 May 2008 38	Piacenza	1–3	AlbinoLeffe

10 May 2008 39	Triestina	1–1	Piacenza

17 May 2008 40	Piacenza	1–1	Grosseto

25 May 2008 41	Cesena	2–2	Piacenza

1 June 2008 42	Piacenza	3–3	Mantova

=== Coppa Italia ===
14 August 2007 Round 1	Piacenza	2–0	Spezia
18:00

18 August 2007 Round 2	Piacenza	2–1	Ravenna
20:30

29 August 2007 Quarter-finals	Reggina	3–2	Piacenza
20:45
