= 2016–17 Serie A =

115th season of top-tier Italian football

Serie A
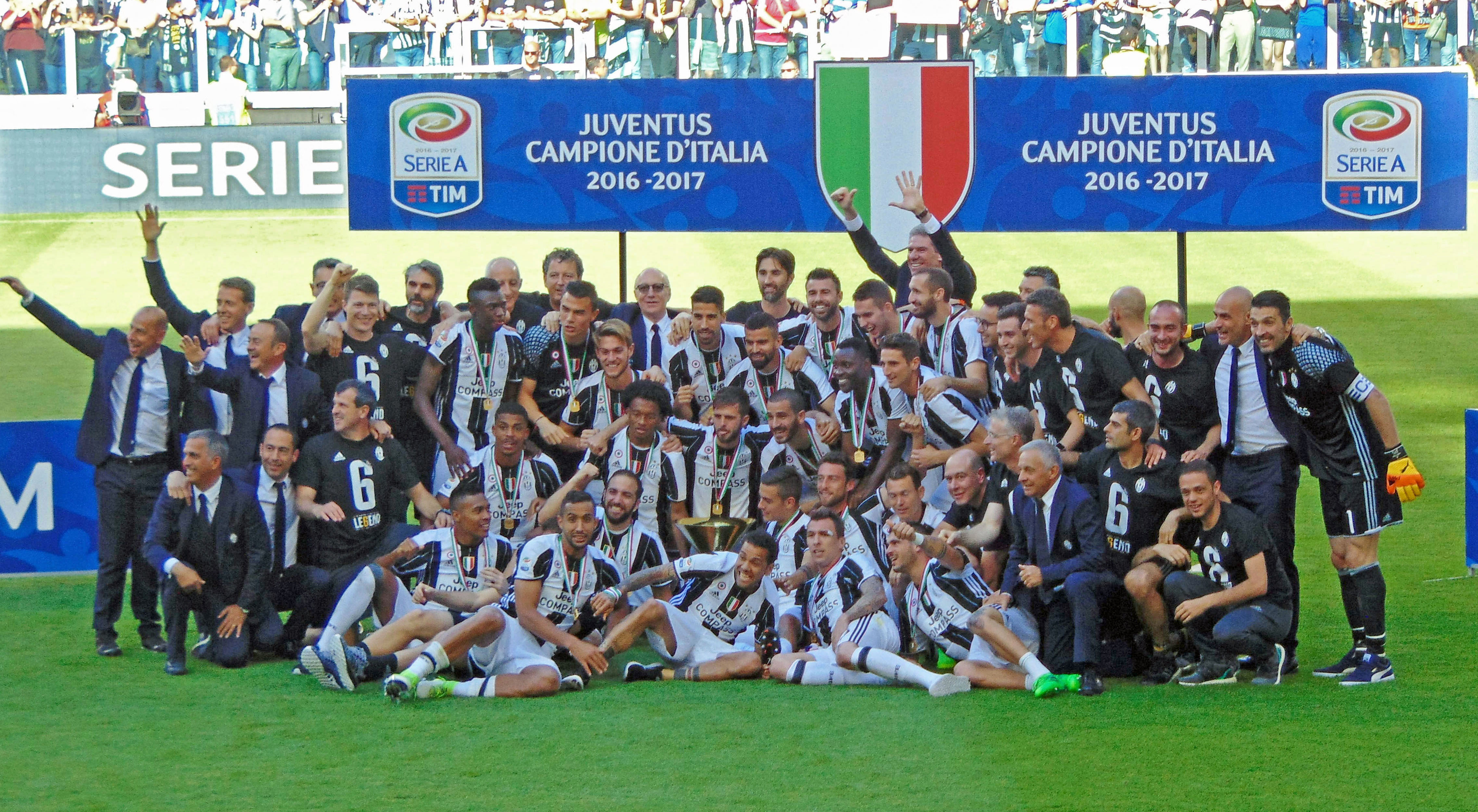
- Juventus celebrating their title win
- Season: 2016–17
- Dates: 20 August 2016 – 28 May 2017
- Champions: Juventus; 33rd title
- Relegated: Empoli; Palermo; Pescara
- Champions League: Juventus; Roma; Napoli
- Europa League: Atalanta; Lazio; Milan
- Matches: 380
- Goals: 1,123 (2.96 per match)
- Top goalscorer: Edin Džeko (29 goals)
- Biggest home win: Internazionale 7–1 Atalanta (12 March 2017)
- Biggest away win: Bologna 1–7 Napoli (4 February 2017)
- Highest scoring: Lazio 7–3 Sampdoria (7 May 2017)
- Longest winning run: 7 games Internazionale; Juventus
- Longest unbeaten run: 16 games Juventus
- Longest winless run: 22 games Pescara
- Longest losing run: 9 games Palermo
- Highest attendance: 78,328; Internazionale 2–2 Milan (15 April 2017)
- Lowest attendance: 510; Crotone 1–1 Palermo (18 September 2016)
- Total attendance: 8,113,386
- Average attendance: 22,047

The 2016–17 Serie A (known as the Serie A TIM for sponsorship reasons) was the 115th season of top-tier Italian football, the 85th in a round-robin tournament, and the 7th since its organization under a league committee separate from Serie B. Juventus were the defending champions. The season ran from 20 August 2016 to 28 May 2017.

On 21 May, Juventus won a record sixth consecutive title and 33rd title overall with a game in hand following their 3–0 win over Crotone.

== Events ==
On 14 April 2016, it was announced that Serie A was selected by the International Football Association Board to test video assistant refereeing, which were initially private for the 2016–17 season, before allowing them to become a live pilot phase with replay assistance in the 2017–18 season at the latest. On the decision, FIGC President Carlo Tavecchio said, "We were among the first supporters of using technology on the pitch and we believe we have everything required to offer our contribution to this important experiment."

On 29 April 2016, Crotone earned their first ever promotion to Serie A. One week later, Cagliari was also promoted after just one year in Serie B. On 9 June 2016, Pescara won the Serie B play-off to return to Serie A after a 3-year absence.

On 13 April 2017, historical Milan president Silvio Berlusconi sold the ownership of the club to Chinese-born, Luxembourg-based Rossoneri Sport Investment Lux, with Li Yonghong as representing acting chairman. The former Prime Minister left the club after 31 years and 29 trophies.

On 28 May 2017, Francesco Totti, AS Roma legendary footballer, played his last match against Genoa.

== Teams ==
=== Stadiums and locations ===
Locations of the 2016–17 Serie A teams

Team	Home city	Stadium	Capacity	2015–16 season
Atalanta	Bergamo	Stadio Atleti Azzurri d'Italia	26,542	13th in Serie A
Bologna	Bologna	Stadio Renato Dall'Ara	38,279	14th in Serie A
Cagliari	Cagliari	Stadio Sant'Elia	16,000	Serie B champions
Chievo	Verona	Stadio Marc'Antonio Bentegodi	38,402	9th in Serie A
Crotone	Crotone	Stadio Ezio Scida	16,547	Serie B runners-up
Empoli	Empoli	Stadio Carlo Castellani	16,800	10th in Serie A
Fiorentina	Florence	Stadio Artemio Franchi	47,282	5th in Serie A
Genoa	Genoa	Stadio Luigi Ferraris	36,685	11th in Serie A
Internazionale	Milan	San Siro	80,018	4th in Serie A
Juventus	Turin	Juventus Stadium	41,507	Serie A champions
Lazio	Rome	Stadio Olimpico	72,698	8th in Serie A
Milan	Milan	San Siro	80,018	7th in Serie A
Napoli	Naples	Stadio San Paolo	60,240	2nd in Serie A
Palermo	Palermo	Stadio Renzo Barbera	36,349	16th in Serie A
Pescara	Pescara	Stadio Adriatico	20,476	Serie B playoffs winners
Roma	Rome	Stadio Olimpico	72,698	3rd in Serie A
Sampdoria	Genoa	Stadio Luigi Ferraris	36,685	15th in Serie A
Sassuolo	Sassuolo	Mapei Stadium – Città del Tricolore (Reggio Emilia)	23,717	6th in Serie A
Torino	Turin	Stadio Olimpico Grande Torino	27,994	12th in Serie A
Udinese	Udine	Dacia Arena	25,144	17th in Serie A

=== Personnel and kits ===
Team	Head coach	Captain	Kit manufacturer	Shirt sponsor(s)	
Team	Head coach	Captain	Kit manufacturer	Main	Other
Atalanta	(Italy) Gian Piero Gasperini	(Italy) Cristian Raimondi	Nike	SuisseGas/TWS	Front: Modus FM/Toulà Catering; Back: Elettrocanali
Bologna	(Italy) Roberto Donadoni	(Italy) Daniele Gastaldello	Macron	FAAC	Back: Illumia
Cagliari	(Italy) Massimo Rastelli	(Italy) Daniele Dessena	Macron	ISOLA Artigianato di Sardegna	Front: Ichnusa; Back: Eva Arredamenti
Chievo	(Italy) Rolando Maran	(Italy) Sergio Pellissier	Givova	Paluani/Pescherie Viviani/Cubi e Perina/Centro Atlante Verona/Midac Batteries/VOL Ortofrutta/Salumi Negri/I. Bis Trading/Nobis Assicurazioni/Salumi Coati/Nico Abbigliamento e Calzature/958 Santero/CF Costruzioni/Italgreen/Candiano Sicily	Front: Midac Batteries/Bottagisio Sport Center/Karrell; Back: Filo diretto Assicurazioni/Nobis Assicurazioni
Crotone	(Italy) Davide Nicola	(Brazil) Claiton	Zeus Sport	Vieni in Calabria/Sovreco/Metal Carpinteria	Back: Metal Carpinteria
Empoli	(Italy) Giovanni Martusciello	(Italy) Massimo Maccarone	Joma	Gensan	Front: Computer Gross; Back: Giletti SpA
Fiorentina	(Portugal) Paulo Sousa	(Argentina) Gonzalo Rodríguez	Le Coq Sportif	Folletto/Vorwerk (in UEFA matches)	Back: Save the Children
Genoa	(Croatia) Ivan Jurić	(Argentina) Nicolás Burdisso	Lotto	Prénatal/Eviva Energia	Front: Syneasy/Zentiva; Back: LeasePlan
Internazionale	(Italy) Stefano Vecchi (caretaker)	(Argentina) Mauro Icardi	Nike	Pirelli	Back: Driver
Juventus	(Italy) Massimiliano Allegri	(Italy) Gianluigi Buffon	Adidas	Jeep/Jeep Compass	None
Lazio	(Italy) Simone Inzaghi	(Argentina) Lucas Biglia	Macron	Clinica Paideia/Libera. Associazioni, nomi e numeri contro le mafie/Sèleco	None
Milan	(Italy) Vincenzo Montella	(Italy) Riccardo Montolivo	Adidas	Fly Emirates	None
Napoli	(Italy) Maurizio Sarri	(Slovakia) Marek Hamšík	Kappa	Lete	Front: Pasta Garofalo; Back: Kimbo Caffè
Palermo	(Italy) Diego Bortoluzzi (caretaker)	(Italy) Roberto Vitiello	Joma	Lewer/Bisaten	Back: Bisaten/Giuseppe Di Maria
Pescara	(Czech Republic) Zdeněk Zeman	(Albania) Ledian Memushaj	Errea	Saquella Caffè	Front: Officina Metalmeccanica Angelucci; Back: Armata di Mare
Roma	(Italy) Luciano Spalletti	(Italy) Francesco Totti	Nike	Telethon	None
Sampdoria	(Italy) Marco Giampaolo	(Italy) Angelo Palombo	Joma	Veratour/Invent Energy	Front: Lino Sonego; Back: SsangYong Tivoli
Sassuolo	(Italy) Eusebio Di Francesco	(Italy) Francesco Magnanelli	Kappa	Mapei	None
Torino	(Serbia) Siniša Mihajlović	(Italy) Marco Benassi	Kappa	Suzuki/Suzuki Ignis	Front: Fratelli Beretta/Il Buon Riso; Back: Tecnoalarm
Udinese	(Italy) Luigi Delneri	(Brazil) Danilo	HS Sport	Dacia	Front: Vortice; Back: Magnadyne

=== Managerial changes ===
Team	Outgoing manager	Manner of departure	Date of vacancy	Position in table	Replaced by	Date of appointment
Empoli	(Italy) Marco Giampaolo	Mutual consent	15 May 2016	Pre-season	(Italy) Giovanni Martusciello	26 May 2016
Udinese	(Italy) Luigi De Canio	End of interim spell	19 May 2016	Pre-season	(Italy) Giuseppe Iachini	19 May 2016
Torino	(Italy) Gian Piero Ventura	Signed by Italy	25 May 2016	Pre-season	(Serbia) Siniša Mihajlović	25 May 2016
Genoa	(Italy) Gian Piero Gasperini	Signed by Atalanta	14 June 2016	Pre-season	(Croatia) Ivan Jurić	28 June 2016
Atalanta	(Italy) Edoardo Reja	Sacked	14 June 2016	Pre-season	(Italy) Gian Piero Gasperini	14 June 2016
Crotone	(Croatia) Ivan Jurić	Signed by Genoa	23 June 2016	Pre-season	(Italy) Davide Nicola	23 June 2016
Sampdoria	(Italy) Vincenzo Montella	Signed by Milan	28 June 2016	Pre-season	(Italy) Marco Giampaolo	4 July 2016
Milan	(Italy) Cristian Brocchi	End of Interim spell	28 June 2016	Pre-season	(Italy) Vincenzo Montella	28 June 2016
Lazio	(Italy) Simone Inzaghi	End of Interim spell	6 July 2016	Pre-season	(Argentina) Marcelo Bielsa	6 July 2016
Lazio	(Argentina) Marcelo Bielsa	Resigned	8 July 2016	Pre-season	(Italy) Simone Inzaghi	8 July 2016
Internazionale	(Italy) Roberto Mancini	Mutual consent	8 August 2016	Pre-season	(Netherlands) Frank de Boer	9 August 2016
Palermo	(Italy) Davide Ballardini	Mutual consent	6 September 2016	15th	(Italy) Roberto De Zerbi	6 September 2016
Udinese	(Italy) Giuseppe Iachini	Sacked	2 October 2016	16th	(Italy) Luigi Delneri	4 October 2016
Internazionale	(Netherlands) Frank de Boer	Sacked	1 November 2016	12th	(Italy) Stefano Vecchi (caretaker)	1 November 2016
Internazionale	(Italy) Stefano Vecchi	End of interim spell	8 November 2016	9th	(Italy) Stefano Pioli	8 November 2016
Palermo	(Italy) Roberto De Zerbi	Sacked	30 November 2016	20th	(Italy) Eugenio Corini	30 November 2016
Palermo	(Italy) Eugenio Corini	Resigned	24 January 2017	19th	(Uruguay) Diego López	26 January 2017
Pescara	(Italy) Massimo Oddo	Sacked	14 February 2017	20th	(Italy) Luciano Zauri (interim)	14 February 2017
Pescara	(Italy) Luciano Zauri	End of interim spell	14 February 2017	20th	(Czech Republic) Zdeněk Zeman	17 February 2017
Genoa	(Croatia) Ivan Jurić	Sacked	19 February 2017	16th	(Italy) Andrea Mandorlini	19 February 2017
Genoa	(Italy) Andrea Mandorlini	Sacked	10 April 2017	16th	(Croatia) Ivan Jurić	10 April 2017
Palermo	(Uruguay) Diego López	Sacked	11 April 2017	19th	(Italy) Diego Bortoluzzi (caretaker)	11 April 2017
Internazionale	(Italy) Stefano Pioli	Sacked	9 May 2017	7th	(Italy) Stefano Vecchi (caretaker)	10 May 2017

== League table ==
Pos	Team	Pld	W	D	L	GF	GA	GD	Pts	Qualification or relegation
1	Juventus (C)	38	29	4	5	77	27	+50	91	Qualification for the Champions League group stage
2	Roma	38	28	3	7	90	38	+52	87	Qualification for the Champions League group stage
3	Napoli	38	26	8	4	94	39	+55	86	Qualification for the Champions League play-off round
4	Atalanta	38	21	9	8	62	41	+21	72	Qualification for the Europa League group stage (Note: Since the winners of the 2016–17 Coppa Italia, Juventus, qualified for European competition based on league position, the spot awarded to the cup winners (Europa League group stage) was passed to the fifth-placed team and the spot awarded to the fifth-placed team (Europa League third qualifying round) was passed to the sixth-placed team.)
5	Lazio	38	21	7	10	74	51	+23	70	Qualification for the Europa League group stage
6	Milan	38	18	9	11	57	45	+12	63	Qualification for the Europa League third qualifying round
7	Internazionale	38	19	5	14	72	49	+23	62	
8	Fiorentina	38	16	12	10	63	57	+6	60	
9	Torino	38	13	14	11	71	66	+5	53	
10	Sampdoria	38	12	12	14	49	55	−6	48	
11	Cagliari	38	14	5	19	55	76	−21	47	
12	Sassuolo	38	13	7	18	58	63	−5	46	
13	Udinese	38	12	9	17	47	56	−9	45	
14	Chievo	38	12	7	19	43	61	−18	43	
15	Bologna	38	11	8	19	40	58	−18	41	
16	Genoa	38	9	9	20	38	64	−26	36	
17	Crotone	38	9	7	22	34	58	−24	34	
18	Empoli (R)	38	8	8	22	29	61	−32	32	Relegation to Serie B
19	Palermo (R)	38	6	8	24	33	77	−44	26	Relegation to Serie B
20	Pescara (R)	38	3	9	26	37	81	−44	18	Relegation to Serie B

Source: Serie A, Soccerway
Rules for classification: 1) Points; 2) Head-to-head points; 3) Head-to-head goal difference; 4) Goal difference; 5) Goals scored; 6) Draw.
(C) Champions; (R) Relegated

== Results ==
Home \ Away	ATA	BOL	CAG	CHV	CRO	EMP	FIO	GEN	INT	JUV	LAZ	MIL	NAP	PAL	PES	ROM	SAM	SAS	TOR	UDI
Atalanta	—	3–2	2–0	1–0	1–0	2–1	0–0	3–0	2–1	2–2	3–4	1–1	1–0	0–1	3–0	2–1	1–0	1–1	2–1	1–3
Bologna	0–2	—	2–1	4–1	1–0	0–0	0–1	0–1	0–1	1–2	0–2	0–1	1–7	3–1	3–1	0–3	2–0	1–1	2–0	4–0
Cagliari	3–0	1–1	—	4–0	2–1	3–2	3–5	4–1	1–5	0–2	0–0	2–1	0–5	2–1	1–0	2–2	2–1	4–3	2–3	2–1
Chievo	1–4	1–1	1–0	—	1–2	4–0	0–3	0–0	2–0	1–2	1–1	1–3	1–3	1–1	2–0	3–5	2–1	2–1	1–3	0–0
Crotone	1–3	0–1	1–2	2–0	—	4–1	0–1	1–3	2–1	0–2	3–1	1–1	1–2	1–1	2–1	0–2	1–1	0–0	0–2	1–0
Empoli	0–1	3–1	2–0	0–0	2–1	—	0–4	0–2	0–2	0–3	1–2	1–4	2–3	1–0	1–1	0–0	0–1	1–3	1–1	1–0
Fiorentina	0–0	1–0	1–0	1–0	1–1	1–2	—	3–3	5–4	2–1	3–2	0–0	3–3	2–1	2–2	1–0	1–1	2–1	2–2	3–0
Genoa	0–5	1–1	3–1	1–2	2–2	0–0	1–0	—	1–0	3–1	2–2	3–0	0–0	3–4	1–1	0–1	0–1	0–1	2–1	1–1
Internazionale	7–1	1–1	1–2	3–1	3–0	2–0	4–2	2–0	—	2–1	3–0	2–2	0–1	1–1	3–0	1–3	1–2	1–2	2–1	5–2
Juventus	3–1	3–0	4–0	2–0	3–0	2–0	2–1	4–0	1–0	—	2–0	2–1	2–1	4–1	3–0	1–0	4–1	3–1	1–1	2–1
Lazio	2–1	1–1	4–1	0–1	1–0	2–0	3–1	3–1	1–3	0–1	—	1–1	0–3	6–2	3–0	0–2	7–3	2–1	3–1	1–0
Milan	0–0	3–0	1–0	3–1	2–1	1–2	2–1	1–0	2–2	1–0	2–0	—	1–2	4–0	1–0	1–4	0–1	4–3	3–2	0–1
Napoli	0–2	3–1	3–1	2–0	3–0	2–0	4–1	2–0	3–0	1–1	1–1	4–2	—	1–1	3–1	1–3	2–1	1–1	5–3	3–0
Palermo	1–3	0–0	1–3	0–2	1–0	2–1	2–0	1–0	0–1	0–1	0–1	1–2	0–3	—	1–1	0–3	1–1	0–1	1–4	1–3
Pescara	0–1	0–3	1–1	0–2	0–1	0–4	1–2	5–0	1–2	0–2	2–6	1–1	2–2	2–0	—	1–4	1–1	1–3	0–0	1–3
Roma	1–1	3–0	1–0	3–1	4–0	2–0	4–0	3–2	2–1	3–1	1–3	1–0	1–2	4–1	3–2	—	3–2	3–1	4–1	4–0
Sampdoria	2–1	3–1	1–1	1–1	1–2	0–0	2–2	2–1	1–0	0–1	1–2	0–1	2–4	1–1	3–1	3–2	—	3–2	2–0	0–0
Sassuolo	0–3	0–1	6–2	1–3	2–1	3–0	2–2	2–0	0–1	0–2	1–2	0–1	2–2	4–1	0–3 (Note: The Lega Serie A announced on 30 August 2016 that Sassuolo were found guilty for fielding an ineligible player in their match against Pescara in Round 2. They decided to award the match to Pescara as a 3–0 forfeit win; the match originally finished 2–1 to Sassuolo.)	1–3	2–1	—	0–0	1–0
Torino	1–1	5–1	5–1	2–1	1–1	0–0	2–1	1–0	2–2	1–3	2–2	2–2	0–5	3–1	5–3	3–1	1–1	5–3	—	2–2
Udinese	1–1	1–0	2–1	1–2	2–0	2–0	2–2	3–0	1–2	1–1	0–3	2–1	1–2	4–1	3–1	0–1	1–1	1–2	2–2	—

Source: Serie A
Legend: Blue = home team win; Yellow = draw; Red = away team win.
For upcoming matches, an "a" indicates there is an article about the rivalry between the two participants.

== Season statistics ==
=== Top goalscorers ===
Rank	Player	Club	Goals
1	(Bosnia and Herzegovina) Edin Džeko	Roma	29
2	(Belgium) Dries Mertens	Napoli	28
3	(Italy) Andrea Belotti	Torino	26
4	(Argentina) Gonzalo Higuaín	Juventus	24
4	(Argentina) Mauro Icardi	Internazionale	24
6	(Italy) Ciro Immobile	Lazio	23
7	(Italy) Lorenzo Insigne	Napoli	18
8	(Senegal) Keita Baldé	Lazio	16
8	(Italy) Marco Borriello	Cagliari	16
8	(Argentina) Alejandro Gómez	Atalanta	16

=== Hat-tricks ===
Player	Club	Against	Result	Date
(Colombia) Carlos Bacca	Milan	Torino	3–2 (H) Archived 24 August 2017 at the Wayback Machine	21 August 2016
(Italy) Andrea Belotti	Torino	Bologna	5–1 (H) Archived 24 August 2017 at the Wayback Machine	28 August 2016
(Croatia) Nikola Kalinić	Fiorentina	Cagliari	5–3 (A) Archived 24 August 2017 at the Wayback Machine	23 October 2016
(Egypt) Mohamed Salah	Roma	Bologna	3–0 (H) Archived 24 August 2017 at the Wayback Machine	6 November 2016
(Belgium) Dries Mertens	Napoli	Cagliari	5–0 (A) Archived 24 August 2017 at the Wayback Machine	11 December 2016
(Belgium) Dries Mertens^{4}	Napoli	Torino	5–3 (H) Archived 24 August 2017 at the Wayback Machine	18 December 2016
(Italy) Diego Falcinelli	Crotone	Empoli	4–1 (H) Archived 24 August 2017 at the Wayback Machine	29 January 2017
(Slovakia) Marek Hamšík	Napoli	Bologna	7–1 (A) Archived 24 August 2017 at the Wayback Machine	4 February 2017
(Belgium) Dries Mertens	Napoli	Bologna	7–1 (A) Archived 24 August 2017 at the Wayback Machine	4 February 2017
(Italy) Marco Parolo^{4}	Lazio	Pescara	6–2 (A) Archived 16 August 2017 at the Wayback Machine	5 February 2017
(Italy) Roberto Inglese	Chievo	Sassuolo	3–1 (A) Archived 24 August 2017 at the Wayback Machine	12 February 2017
(Italy) Andrea Belotti	Torino	Palermo	3–1 (H) Archived 13 August 2017 at the Wayback Machine	5 March 2017
(Argentina) Mauro Icardi	Internazionale	Atalanta	7–1 (H) Archived 13 August 2017 at the Wayback Machine	12 March 2017
(Argentina) Éver Banega	Internazionale	Atalanta	7–1 (H) Archived 13 August 2017 at the Wayback Machine	12 March 2017
(Argentina) Alejandro Gómez	Atalanta	Genoa	5–0 (A) Archived 16 August 2017 at the Wayback Machine	2 April 2017
(Argentina) Mauro Icardi	Internazionale	Fiorentina	4–5 (A) Archived 24 August 2017 at the Wayback Machine	22 April 2017
(Senegal) Keita Baldé	Lazio	Palermo	6–2 (H) Archived 24 August 2017 at the Wayback Machine	23 April 2017
(France) Grégoire Defrel	Sassuolo	Torino	3–5 (A) Archived 24 August 2017 at the Wayback Machine	28 May 2017

^{4} Player scored four goals; (H) – Home (A) – Away

== Awards ==
=== Annual awards ===
Award	Winner	Club
Most Valuable Player	(Italy) Gianluigi Buffon	Juventus
Coach of the Year	(Italy) Maurizio Sarri	Napoli
Best Goalkeeper	(Italy) Gianluigi Buffon	Juventus

Serie A Team of the Year
Goalkeeper	(Italy) Gianluigi Buffon (Juventus)			
Defenders	(Brazil) Dani Alves (Juventus)	(Italy) Leonardo Bonucci (Juventus)	(Senegal) Kalidou Koulibaly (Napoli)	(Brazil) Alex Sandro (Juventus)
Midfielders	(Belgium) Radja Nainggolan (Roma)		(Slovakia) Marek Hamšík (Napoli)	(Bosnia and Herzegovina) Miralem Pjanić (Juventus)
Forwards	(Belgium) Dries Mertens (Napoli)		(Argentina) Gonzalo Higuaín (Juventus)	(Argentina) Paulo Dybala (Juventus)

== Attendances ==
Team	Av. home att.
Internazionale	46,620
Milan	40,294
Juventus	39,489
Napoli	36,605
Roma	32,638
Fiorentina	26,470
Lazio	21,947
Bologna	21,912
Genoa	20,347
Sampdoria	19,852
Torino	19,300
Udinese	17,448
Atalanta	16,946
Cagliari	13,467
Chievo	13,368
Pescara	13,308
Palermo	13,204
Sassuolo	12,362
Empoli	9,483
Crotone	8,222
