= Alessandro Pane =

Italian footballer (born 1967)

Personal information
- Date of birth: 20 November 1967 (age 58)
- Place of birth: Tripoli, Libya
- Height: 1.70 m (5 ft 7 in)
- Position: Midfielder

Team information
- Current team: Salernitana (assistant)

Senior career*
Years	Team	Apps	(Gls)
1985–1986	Verona	0	(0)
1986–1987	Sassuolo	31	(2)
1987–1989	Sorrento	61	(4)
1989–1990	Barletta	0	(0)
1990–1991	Tempio	33	(1)
1991–1992	Taranto	8	(0)
1992–1994	Pontedera	64	(6)
1994–2000	Empoli	189	(8)
2000–2002	Catania	33	(1)
Total		439	(22)

Managerial career
- 2002–2004: Empoli (youth)
- 2004–2006: CuoioCappiano
- 2006–2009: Reggiana
- 2009: Ascoli
- 2010–2011: Spezia
- 2011: Lugano
- 2012–2013: Pisa
- 2013–2015: Italy U19
- 2013–2015: Italy U18 (assistant)
- 2015: Rimini
- 2016–2017: Roma (coordinator)
- 2017–2019: Internazionale (coordinator)
- 2024–: Salernitana (assistant)
- * Club domestic league appearances and goals

Alessandro Pane (born 20 November 1967) is an Italian former professional footballer and manager, who played as a midfielder.

== Playing career ==
As a player, Pane stood out especially playing for Empoli, where he played for six seasons, two in Serie A, making 189 appearances and scoring 8 goals in total.

== Managerial career ==
Pane started his career as a manager in the youth sectors of Empoli (Allievi Nazionali and Primavera). From 2004 to 2006, he was coach of CuoioCappiano in Serie C2.

On 26 September 2006, Pane arrived at Reggiana, a team he led for four seasons, becoming champion of Group B in Serie C2. On 17 June 2009, he took charge of Ascoli in Serie B, leading the team for 15 matches and being sacked after a defeat to AC Ancona.

Pane also coached the Spezia, Lugano, Pisa and Rimini teams, as well as the Italy under-19 team in the 2015 UEFA European Under-19 Championship qualification.

In 2016, at the invitation of coach Luciano Spalletti, he joined the technical coordination at AS Roma, a role he would later repeat at Internazionale. Since July 2024, he has been a technical assistant to Giovanni Martusciello at US Salernitana 1919.

== Honours ==
=== Player ===
Empoli

- Coppa Italia Serie C: 1995-96

=== Manager ===
Reggiana

- Serie C2: 2007–08 (group B)
- Supercoppa di Lega di Seconda Divisione: 2007–08

Individual

- Panchina d'argento Seconda Divisione: 2007–08
