= Stefano Colantuono =

Italian footballer (born 1962)

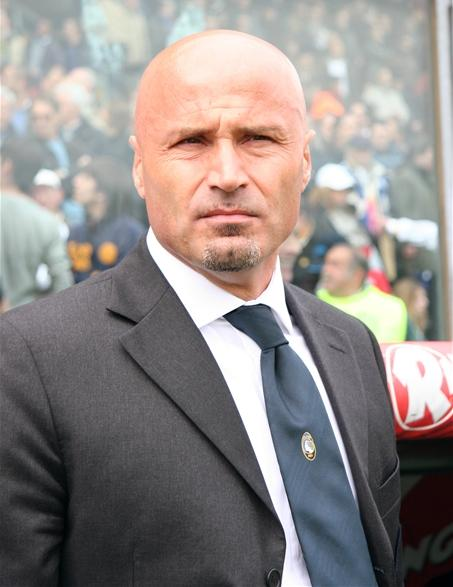

Personal information
- Date of birth: 23 October 1962 (age 64)
- Place of birth: Rome, Italy
- Position: Defender

Senior career*
Years	Team	Apps	(Gls)
1981–1983	Velletri	46	(2)
1983–1984	Ternana	16	(3)
1984–1985	Arezzo	36	(1)
1985–1986	Pisa	24	(0)
1986–1988	Avellino	53	(2)
1988–1989	Como	23	(1)
1989–1991	Ascoli	38	(0)
1991–1992	BNL Roma (futsal)	?	(?)
1992–1993	Frosinone	27	(1)
1993–1994	Fermana	28	(5)
1994–1995	Sambenedettese	25	(2)
1995–1999	Maceratese	112	(6)
1999–2000	Sestrese	34	(2)
2000–2002	Sambenedettese	31	(5)

Managerial career
- 2002–2003: Sambenedettese
- 2003–2004: Catania
- 2004–2005: Perugia
- 2005–2007: Atalanta
- 2007: Palermo
- 2008: Palermo
- 2009: Torino
- 2010: Torino
- 2010–2015: Atalanta
- 2015–2016: Udinese
- 2016–2017: Bari
- 2017–2018: Salernitana
- 2021–2022: Salernitana
- 2024: Salernitana
- 2024: Salernitana
- * Club domestic league appearances and goals

Stefano Colantuono (born 23 October 1962) is an Italian football professional football manager and former player, who played as a defender.

== Playing career ==
Colantuono, a centre back, started his playing career for Serie D side Velletri in 1981. In 1983, he moved to Ternana of Serie C1, then Arezzo of Serie B, and finally made his Serie A debut for Pisa. He played in Serie A until 1990 for several teams. In 1991, he accepted to play in the national futsal league for BNL Roma, winning a scudetto. Following this experience, Colantuono played mostly at lower levels, especially Serie C2 and Serie D, and even Eccellenza for Sambenedettese in 1994–95. After many experiences in different Italian regions, Colantuono returned to play for Sambenedettese in November 2000, leading his team to an immediate promotion to Serie C2.

== Managerial career ==
The 2001–02 Serie C2 season for Sambenedettese was going to be very hard, with two coaches fired. After the sack of the third coach Enrico Nicolini, Colantuono, a player for the team, was appointed to manage Sambenedettese together with Gabriele Matricciani for the last nine matches. Surprisingly, Colantuono managed to win all these nine matches, leading his team to a fifth place, qualifying and successively even winning the promotion playoffs.

Colantuono's Serie C1 coaching debut, during the 2002–03 season, ended in another fifth place, securing a place in the promotion playoff, then lost to Pescara. In the meanwhile, Luciano Gaucci, owner of Sambenedettese, Serie B team Catania and Serie A team Perugia at the time, appointed Colantuono at the helm of the Sicilian side. Again, supported by Matricciani because of his lack of a regular coaching license, Colantuono led Catania to a reasonably good season in ninth place. In 2004–05, after the Gaucci family sold Catania, Colantuono was finally authorized to act as the first team coach, signed for Perugia, and was just relegated to Serie B. He led the team to a spot in the promotion playoff, then lost to Torino. After the cancellation of Perugia, in 2005–06 Colantuono accepted the offer of Atalanta, leading the nerazzurri to a clear Serie B win. In the 2006–07 season, he led Atalanta to an eighth-place finish in the Serie A table.

On 31 May 2007, he was announced as the new Palermo head coach to replace Francesco Guidolin. However, after a number of unimpressive performances ended by a crushing 5–0 loss to Juventus persuaded club chairman Maurizio Zamparini to sack him on 26 November 2007. He was once again recalled on 24 March 2008 to replace Guidolin as head coach of Palermo. However, Colantuono was sacked again after just one game of the 2008–09 season, and was replaced by Davide Ballardini on 4 September.

On 15 June 2009, he was appointed as the new head coach of Torino, replacing Giancarlo Camolese. He guided the granata through their 2009–10 Serie B campaign, with the aim to promptly lead the historical Turin club back into the top flight. He was however fired on 29 November due to poor results and replaced by Mario Beretta. On 10 January 2010 he was then reappointed as head coach to replace Beretta himself. He announced his resignation after losing the promotion playoff finals to Brescia, contemporaneously confirming he was in talks for the vacant coaching post at his previous club Atalanta. Colantuono's comeback at Atalanta was officially announced the next day. Under his tenure, Atalanta promptly won the "Cadetti" and promotion back to Serie A in his first season in charge during the 2010–11 Serie B season.

Colantuono led Atalanta's successful return to the top flight during the 2011–12 Serie A season, resulting in a comfortable 12th-place finish, despite the club beginning the season with a six-point deduction for its involvement in the 2011–12 Italian football scandal. An additional deduction of 2 points followed before the 2012–13 Serie A season. However, Colantuono still managed to guide Atalanta to safety with a 15th-place finish. Keeping with their manager for the 2013–14 Serie A campaign, Colantuono secured 11th place and some impressive performances, including victories of local rivals Internazionale and A.C. Milan. Before the start of the 2014–15 Serie A season, Colantuono committed his future to Atalanta; however, the season did not go well and after a poor run of form he was dismissed on 4 March 2015 and replaced by Edy Reja, leaving Atalanta only 3 points above the relegation zone. He took up the head coach position soon after at Udinese.

He then guided Bari from November 2016 until June 2017, only achieving twelfth place with one of the clubs more widely expected to fight for a promotion spot. He was subsequently appointed head coach of Salernitana in December 2017, taking over from Alberto Bollini, guiding the club to a mid-table finish.

After being confirmed in charge of Salernitana for the 2018–19 season, Colantuono resigned on 18 December 2018 after three consecutive defeats, leaving the promotion hopefuls in a mid-table position in the league table.

In September 2020 he accepted a non-coaching managerial role at his former club Sambenedettese, being appointed as technical director. He was removed from his role on 11 January 2021.

On 17 October 2021, he was appointed new head coach of his former team Salernitana, replacing Fabrizio Castori and taking over with the club being at the bottom of the 2021–22 Serie A table. He was removed from his managerial duties on 15 February 2022, a few weeks after a club takeover, after failing to improve the club's fortunes. On 8 August 2022, he was re-hired by Salernitana as the club's new youth system chief.

On 19 March 2024, Colantuono was appointed as head coach of Salernitana until the end of the season following the dismissal of Fabio Liverani. He guided the club until the end of the season, which ended with relegation to Serie B, then returning to his previous role as youth system chief.

On 11 November 2024, he was appointed once again as head coach following the dismissal of Giovanni Martusciello, as the club was deep in the relegation of zone in the 2024–25 Serie B season. However, on 30 December 2024, after failing to turn the team's fortunes, Colantuono departed from Salernitana by mutual consent.

== Managerial statistics ==
As of 25 May 2024

Managerial record by team and tenure
Team	From	To	Record							
Team	From	To	G	W	D	L	GF	GA	GD	Win %
Sambenedettese	1 March 2002	1 July 2003	57	30	18	9	85	47	+38	52.63
Catania	1 July 2003	1 July 2004	49	20	14	15	60	54	+6	40.82
Perugia	1 July 2004	30 June 2005	49	25	12	12	64	38	+26	51.02
Atalanta	30 June 2005	7 June 2007	88	42	23	23	133	99	+34	47.73
Palermo	7 June 2007	26 November 2007	15	5	6	4	18	22	−4	33.33
Palermo	25 March 2008	4 September 2008	10	3	2	5	10	14	−4	30.00
Torino	15 June 2009	29 November 2009	18	7	5	6	23	17	+6	38.89
Torino	10 January 2010	13 June 2010	25	13	7	5	33	20	+13	52.00
Atalanta	14 June 2010	4 March 2015	193	73	48	72	228	238	−10	37.82
Udinese	4 June 2015	14 March 2016	32	10	6	16	32	48	−16	31.25
Bari	7 November 2016	13 June 2017	29	9	10	10	26	29	−3	31.03
Salernitana	12 December 2017	18 December 2018	41	13	12	16	48	55	−7	31.71
Salernitana	17 October 2021	15 February 2022	16	2	3	11	11	37	−26	12.50
Salernitana	19 March 2024	Present	9	0	3	6	9	22	−13	0.00
Total			631	252	169	210	780	740	+40	39.94

== Honours ==
=== Atalanta ===
- Serie B: 2005–06, 2010–11
