= Diego Bortoluzzi =

Italian footballer and manager (born 1966)

Personal information
- Full name: Diego Bortoluzzi
- Date of birth: 23 September 1966 (age 60)
- Place of birth: Vittorio Veneto, Italy
- Position: Midfielder

Senior career*
Years	Team	Apps	(Gls)
1984–1989	Atalanta	12	(0)
1987–1988	Piacenza	27	(0)
1988–1989	L.R. Vicenza	18	(0)
1989–1990	Brescia	4	(0)
1990–1991	Pro Sesto	32	(5)
1991–1995	Venezia	113	(15)
1995	Avellino	10	(0)
1995–1996	Venezia	24	(3)
1996–1997	Siena	33	(4)
1997–2002	Treviso	113	(14)
2002–2003	Conegliano	4	(0)

Managerial career
- 2006: Treviso
- 2017: Palermo
- * Club domestic league appearances and goals

Diego Bortoluzzi (born 23 September 1966) is an Italian professional football coach, most recently in charge as head coach of Palermo in Serie A.

== Playing career ==
Coming from the renowned youth system of Atalanta, Bortoluzzi made his senior debut in the Serie A league on 17 March 1985, in a game against Napoli. He was successively loaned out to Piacenza (Serie B) and L.R. Vicenza (Serie C1) before leaving Atalanta for good to join rivals Brescia. After a single season back at Serie C1 level with Pro Sesto, he joined Venezia in 1991, playing five full Serie B seasons with the club. He then remarkably played five seasons at Treviso as key player and also team captain, before retiring in 2003 after a short stint with amateurs Conegliano.

== Coaching career ==
In January 2004, Francesco Guidolin appointed Bortoluzzi as his assistant coach at Palermo, with whom he oversaw a historic promotion to Serie A over 30 years after the Rosanero's last top flight appearance.

He left Palermo on the summer of 2005, following Guidolin's departure, to become youth coach of his former playing club Treviso, who were just promoted to the top flight for their very first time. He was successively appointed new head coach in February 2006, following Alberto Cavasin's dismissal and with just 14 points in the league, failing to save the team from relegation. Despite that, he was confirmed for the following Serie B season, only to be fired on 5 November after managing to achieve only ten points in the first ten league games.

In November 2007, he returned to Palermo to work alongside Guidolin, then following him to work as his assistant at Parma and Udinese. He then served as Andrea Mandorlini's assistant at Verona from July to November 2015, and then again as Guidolin's assistant at Swansea from January to October 2016.

On 11 April 2017, he was named as the fifth head coach of the season of Palermo (after Davide Ballardini, Roberto De Zerbi, Eugenio Corini and Luis Diego López) for the remainder of the season, with Palermo having just achieved 15 points in 31 games (out of 38) and deep in relegation trouble. Among all things, the club's new chairman Paul Baccaglini explicitly stated his appointment was suggested by Francesco Guidolin. Despite an improvement in results, Bortoluzzi did not manage to save the team from relegation to Serie B and he was thus not confirmed for the new season.
