= Carlo Sabatini (football manager) =

Italian football coach (born 1960)

Personal information
- Date of birth: 23 September 1960 (age 66)
- Place of birth: Perugia, Italy

Team information
- Current team: Como

Managerial career
- Years: Team
- 2008–2009: Padova
- 2009–2010: Padova
- 2010: Padova
- 2011: Frosinone
- 2012: Carrarese
- 2013–2014: Mantova
- 2015: Como

Carlo Sabatini (born 23 September 1960) is an Italian football coach. He was most recently the head coach of Serie B club Como.

He is the brother of Walter Sabatini.

== Career ==
=== Coach ===
He began his career as a coach in Pontevecchio. He then moved to the youth of Padova, where played with Alessandro Del Piero. He was then promoted to the first team, bringing in Serie B.

In 2011, he moved to Frosinone in Lega Pro Prima Divisione.

On July 5, 2012, he became the new coach of Carrarese in Lega Pro Prima Divisione; on 30 September 2012, he resigned.

On November 12, 2013, he became the new coach of Mantova in Lega Pro Seconda Divisione.

At the end of the season 2013–14, they were promoted in the Lega Pro. On May 8, 2014, he left Mantova.

On January 13, 2015, he became the new coach of Como in Lega Pro. At the end of the season, they were promoted to Serie B. In October 2015, during the ongoing season, after a league match against Modena which ended 1–1, the president of Como Pietro Porro ended Sabatini's contract. Sabatini managed eleven matches in Lega Pro.
