= Giovanni Martusciello =

Italian footballer and coach

Personal information
- Full name: Giovanni Martusciello
- Date of birth: 19 August 1971 (age 55)
- Place of birth: Ischia, Italy
- Position: Attacking midfielder

Senior career*
| Years | Team | Apps | (Gls) |
| 1988–1995 | Ischia Isolaverde | 160 | (6) |
| 1995–1999 | Empoli | 118 | (12) |
| 1999–2000 | → Genoa (loan) | 16 | (1) |
| 2000 | → Palermo (loan) | 5 | (1) |
| 2000–2002 | Cittadella | 42 | (3) |
| 2002–2003 | Catania | 29 | (3) |
| 2003–2004 | Sambenedettese | 19 | (1) |
| 2004–2005 | Lucchese | 29 | (1) |
| 2005–2006 | Pontedera | 22 | (1) |

Managerial career
- 2016–2017: Empoli
- 2024: Lazio (caretaker)
- 2024: Salernitana
- * Club domestic league appearances and goals

Giovanni Martusciello (born 19 August 1971) is an Italian association football coach and former player.

== Playing career ==
An attacking midfielder, Martusciello started his career in his native island of Ischia, playing with then-Serie C1 club Ischia Isolaverde. He left his hometown club in 1995 to join Empoli, also in the Serie C1 league, being one of the protagonists of the club's two consecutive promotions up to the Serie A under a young coach Luciano Spalletti. He made his top-flight debut on 31 August 1997 in a game against Roma.

In 1999, he left Empoli to join Genoa, and then down to Serie C1 with Palermo in January 2000. He returned to play Serie B with Cittadella and Catania in the following three seasons before ending his career after minor league stints with Sambenedettese, Lucchese and Pontedera.

== Coaching career ==
After his retirement as a footballer, Martusciello returned to Empoli, this time as a youth coach. He was then promoted as assistant under Alfredo Aglietti, then Maurizio Sarri and, lastly, Marco Giampaolo. In the summer of 2016, he was named the new head coach of Empoli for the upcoming 2016–17 Serie A campaign, which was his first role as a head coach outright. He completed the season with Empoli relegated on the final matchday, which led to him leaving the club. He was successively appointed as technical collaborator of Luciano Spalletti at Inter Milan. Spalletti was relieved from his duty as Inter's head coach in June 2019, and subsequently, Mastusciello joined the staff of newly appointed Juventus head coach Maurizio Sarri as an assistant manager. For the first two matches of the 2019–20 season, Martusciello took the lead on the bench with Sarri out due to pneumonia.

Martusciello successively joined Sarri in his coaching stint at Lazio in 2021. In March 2024, following Sarri's resignation from his head coaching post, Martusciello was named interim head coach in charge of the first team. He guided Lazio in an away game against Frosinone, ended in a 3–2 win for the biancazzurri, before leaving the club to make room for Igor Tudor.

On 3 July 2024, Martusciello was unveiled as the new head coach of Serie B club Salernitana.
