= Mario Beretta =

Italian footballer and manager

Personal information
- Date of birth: 30 October 1959 (age 66)
- Place of birth: Milan, Italy
- Position: Midfielder

Team information
- Current team: AC Milan (coordinateur jeunes)

Senior career*
Years	Team	Apps	(Gls)
1976–77	Pro Sesto		
1978–79	Rovellasca		

Managerial career
- 1982–1984: Abbiategrasso (youth team)
- 1984–1989: Monza (youth team)
- 1989–1991: Como (youth team)
- 1991–1994: Monza (youth team)
- 1994–1995: Corsico
- 1995–1996: Pro Patria
- 1996–1997: Saronno
- 1997–1998: Como
- 1998–1999: Lumezzane
- 1999–2002: Varese
- 2002–2004: Ternana
- 2004–2005: Chievo Verona
- 2005–2006: Parma
- 2006–2007: Siena
- 2007–2008: Siena
- 2008–2009: Lecce
- 2009–2010: Torino
- 2010: PAOK
- 2010–2011: Brescia
- 2012: Cesena
- 2013–2014: Siena
- 2014: Latina
- 2015: Cagliari (youth team)
- 2018–: AC Milan (coordinateur jeunes)
- * Club domestic league appearances and goals

Mario Beretta (born 30 October 1959) is an Italian football manager and former player. He most recently served as head coach of Serie B club Latina.

== Playing career ==
Beretta was born in Milan. He had a short career as a footballer, playing only in the 1976–77 season for Pro Sesto and in that 1978–79 for Rovellasca in Serie D.

== Coaching career ==
In 1982, aged 23, he became a coach for the amateur team Abbiategrasso's youth squad, and in 1984 for Monza's. He was also a successful School Teacher in the mid-eighties for Istituto Gonzaga and Istituto Leopardi in Milan. His first team role came in 1994 for amateur side Corsico, whereas his first professional appearance came the next year for Pro Patria, followed by Saronno, Como and Lumezzane.

After three successful seasons with Varese of Serie C1, Beretta was signed by Ternana of Serie B. An exciting debut in 2002–03 was followed by a sacking the next season. In 2004–05, Serie A club Chievo Verona called him to replace Luigi Delneri. Despite a strong start, Beretta's Chievo slowly but continuously fell down the table, and he was fired three matchdays to the end of the season, with Chievo fully involved in a tough relegation battle, to be replaced by caretaker Maurizio D'Angelo.

In 2005–06, he coached successfully Parma, ending in tenth place, then turned out to be seventh following the 2006 Serie A scandal, which consequently led Parma to a UEFA Cup qualifying. Then he coached Siena for the 2006–07 season, but he suffered in the relegation fight until the last matchday. Siena kept its place in Serie A after a dramatic win over S.S. Lazio. Some days later he agreed to leave the club, being replaced by Andrea Mandorlini; however he was reappointed at the helm of the Tuscan side after Mandorlini was sacked on 12 November 2007 following a 3–2 home loss to Livorno.

On 18 May 2008, after Siena's 2–2 draw against Palermo in the final matchday, Beretta said in his press conference that he was quitting Siena. This was confirmed by the club a few days later; he left Siena after a very impressive season ended with a record 44 points, the best result in Robur's time in the Italian top flight. He was successively announced on 23 June as new head coach of Lecce, newly promoted in the 2008–09 Serie A. He was sacked on 9 March after a 0–0 home draw against bottom-placed Reggina in the Week 27 of Serie A that left Lecce in second-last place.

On 29 November 2009, Beretta agreed to replace Stefano Colantuono at the helm of Serie B outfit Torino F.C. and in January 2010 Torino have fired the coach, who was replaced by his predecessor Stefano Colantuono.

In June 2010, Beretta signed a two-year contract with Greek side PAOK, with this being his first experience outside his homeland. However, on 22 July 2010, just a month after his appointment at the helm of the squad, Paok chairman Thodoris Zagorakis decided to sack him due to poor pre-season results and rumoured complaints from some players. Mario Beretta was immediately replaced by Pavlos Dermitzakis.

On 6 December 2010, Beretta was announced as new head coach of Serie A relegation-threatened Lombardians Brescia, replacing Giuseppe Iachini at the helm of the Rondinelle. His tenure as Brescia boss lasted less than two months, as he was dismissed on 30 January 2011 after a 3–0 home loss to relegation-battling rivals Chievo.

Since 21 February 2012 to the end of the season he has been the coach of Cesena in Serie A. He successively served as head coach of financially stricken Serie B club Siena, narrowly missing, in the last minutes of the season, despite eight points of penalization, on a promotion playoff spot only to oversee the club being excluded from professional football for good by the end of the season.

After Siena, he agreed upon a contract with Latina of Serie B in July 2014, only to mutually end his deal just in October due to what the club considered poor results (seven pts in seven matches).
