= Giancarlo Camolese =

Italian footballer and manager (born 1961)

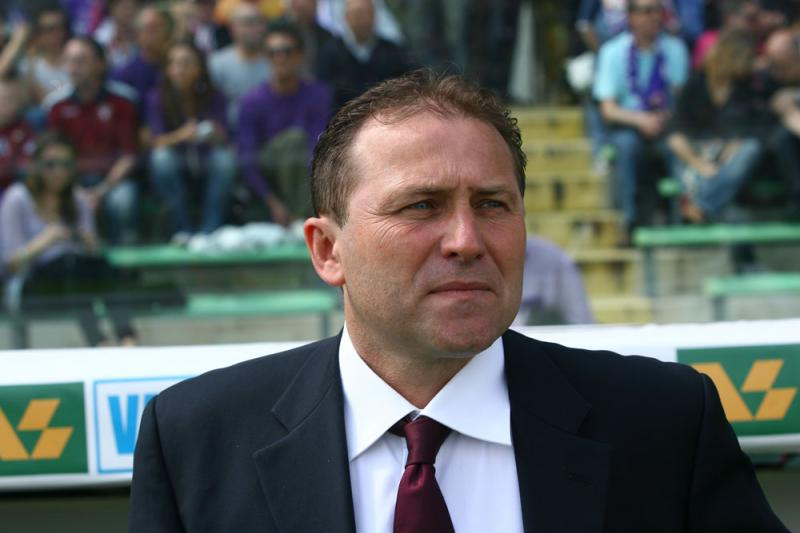

Personal information
- Date of birth: 25 February 1961 (age 65)
- Place of birth: Turin, Italy
- Position: Midfielder

Youth career
- Torino

Senior career*
Years	Team	Apps	(Gls)
1978–1979	Torino	0	(0)
1979–1980	Biellese	25	(0)
1980–1982	Reggina	53	(1)
1982–1986	Alessandria	125	(5)
1986–1988	Lazio	46	(0)
1988–1990	Padova	65	(0)
1990–1991	Vicenza	26	(1)
1991–1992	Taranto	32	(0)

Managerial career
- 2001–2002: Torino
- 2003–2004: Reggina
- 2005–2006: Vicenza
- 2007–2008: Livorno
- 2009: Torino
- 2012–2013: Pro Vercelli
- 2015–2016: Chiasso
- * Club domestic league appearances and goals

Giancarlo Camolese (born 25 February 1961) is an Italian football manager and former player.

== Playing career ==
Camolese was born in Turin. A midfielder, he began his professional career in the Unione Sportiva San Mauro and then made his first-team debut with Torino in 1974. He played for Biellese, Reggina, Alessandria, Lazio, Padova, Vicenza, Taranto and for Saviglianese at the end of his career.

He played a total of 230 matches in Serie C, which is currently the Lega Pro, and 141 matches in Serie B for Lazio, Padova and Taranto, while he never made his debut in Serie A, having only played for Torino in the Coppa Italia. He rose to fame with Lazio starting from -9 in the 1986–87 season and was promoted into Serie A at the end of the 1987–88 football season.

== Coaching career ==
Camolese began his coaching career as Saviglianese's youth coach which was the team in which he had terminated his career as footballer. He was hired by Torino as second coach of the first team managed by Mauro Sandreani and later by Lido Vieri.

In the following season he worked as vice coach for Graeme Souness and then Edy Reya.

In 1998, he took part in the "Supercorso di Coverciano" (super course for coaches) which he passed with flying colours. In 1999, he worked for Torino as coach for the Youth Under 20, which he took to the national football championship finals.

At the end of October 2000 he replaced Gigi Simoni when he was dismissed from the bench leading the team to gain the first position in Serie A . With the Granata team he made his debut in the Serie A by winning the Intertoto qualification.

Although he had achieved the highest number of points the previous year, he was dismissed in October 2002.

In the 2003–04 season he replaced Franco Colomba as coach of the Serie A Reggina team and led them to safety.

In 2005, he became coach of the Vicenza team (for which he had been captain from 1990 to 1991) and managed to save them on the last day and was reconfirmed as coach for the 2006–07 season. On 10 October 2007, he replaced Fernando Orsi as coach of the Livorno team finishing last in the Serie A table. After a good recovery, he was dismissed after a difficult second round a few days before the end.

On 24 March 2009, he was back on the bench for Torino, where he took over from Walter Novellino, although he was not able to save the team from relegation which occurred on 31 May 2009 after being defeated 3–2 by Roma and despite having obtained 10 points in 9 matches this defeat cost him his reappointment for the following season.

After a long absence from the bench, due to family problems, on 15 October 2012 Camolese started coaching again and became the Manager of the Pro Vercelli team. He was dismissed on 3 January 2013 having only gained 8 points from 2 draws and 2 wins in 13 matches. On 20 October he replaces the outgoing M.Schallibaum in Chiasso FC (Swisse Challenge League ) with a contract valid until June 2016, reaching a comfortable salvation finishing in seventh place, the best result of the Club over the last three years.

== Honours ==
=== Manager ===
Torino

- Serie B: 2000–01
